= 2021 ATP Challenger Tour =

Tennis tour

Details
- Duration: 18 January 2021 – 19 December 2021
- Edition: 44th (13th under this name)
- Tournaments: 147
- Categories: Challenger 125 (11); Challenger 110 (0); Challenger 100 (10); Challenger 90 (11); Challenger 80 (105); Challenger 50 (10)

Achievements (singles)
- Most titles: (Netherlands) Tallon Griekspoor (8)
- Most finals: (Argentina) Sebastián Báez (9)

The ATP Challenger Tour in 2021 was the secondary professional tennis circuit organized by the ATP. The 2021 ATP Challenger Tour calendar comprised 147 tournaments with prize money ranging from $36,680 up to $156,240. It was the 44th edition of challenger tournaments cycle, and 13th under the name of Challenger Tour.

Tallon Griekspoor set a new record for winning the most Challenger titles in a season when he won his seventh title of the season at the Tenerife Challenger and immediately improved upon the record by winning the Slovak Open II the week after.

== Schedule ==
This is the complete schedule of events on the 2021 calendar, with player progression documented from the quarterfinals stage.

=== January ===
Week of	Tournament	Champions	Runners-up	Semifinalists	Quarterfinalists
January 18	Amex-Istanbul Challenger; Istanbul, Turkey; Challenger 125 – Hard (i) – 32S/16Q/16D; Singles – Doubles	(France) Arthur Rinderknech; 4–6, 7–6^{(7–1)}, 7–6^{(7–3)}	(France) Benjamin Bonzi	(Slovakia) Jozef Kovalík (Egypt) Mohamed Safwat	(Turkey) Ergi Kırkın (Switzerland) Marc-Andrea Hüsler (France) Antoine Hoang (Japan) Go Soeda
January 18	Amex-Istanbul Challenger; Istanbul, Turkey; Challenger 125 – Hard (i) – 32S/16Q/16D; Singles – Doubles	(Sweden) André Göransson (Netherlands) David Pel; 4–6, 6–3, [10–8]	(United Kingdom) Lloyd Glasspool (Finland) Harri Heliövaara	(Slovakia) Jozef Kovalík (Egypt) Mohamed Safwat	(Turkey) Ergi Kırkın (Switzerland) Marc-Andrea Hüsler (France) Antoine Hoang (Japan) Go Soeda
January 25	Open Quimper Bretagne; Quimper, France; Challenger 100 – Hard (i) – 32S/16Q/16D; Singles – Doubles	(United States) Sebastian Korda; 6–1, 6–1	(Slovakia) Filip Horanský	(United States) Brandon Nakashima (France) Benjamin Bonzi	(Poland) Kacper Żuk (France) Constant Lestienne (Ukraine) Illya Marchenko (France) Enzo Couacaud
January 25	Open Quimper Bretagne; Quimper, France; Challenger 100 – Hard (i) – 32S/16Q/16D; Singles – Doubles	(France) Grégoire Barrère (France) Albano Olivetti; 5–7, 7–6^{(9–7)}, [10–8]	(United States) James Cerretani (Switzerland) Marc-Andrea Hüsler	(United States) Brandon Nakashima (France) Benjamin Bonzi	(Poland) Kacper Żuk (France) Constant Lestienne (Ukraine) Illya Marchenko (France) Enzo Couacaud
January 25	Antalya Challenger; Antalya, Turkey; Challenger 80 – Clay – 32S/16Q/16D; Singles – Doubles	(Spain) Jaume Munar; 6–7^{(7–9)}, 6–2, 6–2	(Italy) Lorenzo Musetti	(Spain) Tommy Robredo (Turkey) Cem İlkel	(Italy) Alessandro Giannessi (Croatia) Duje Ajduković (Argentina) Tomás Martín Etcheverry (Australia) Akira Santillan
January 25	Antalya Challenger; Antalya, Turkey; Challenger 80 – Clay – 32S/16Q/16D; Singles – Doubles	(Ukraine) Denys Molchanov (Kazakhstan) Aleksandr Nedovyesov; 3–6, 6–4, [18–16]	(Venezuela) Luis David Martínez (Spain) David Vega Hernández	(Spain) Tommy Robredo (Turkey) Cem İlkel	(Italy) Alessandro Giannessi (Croatia) Duje Ajduković (Argentina) Tomás Martín Etcheverry (Australia) Akira Santillan

=== February ===
Week of	Tournament	Champions	Runners-up	Semifinalists	Quarterfinalists
February 1	Open Quimper Bretagne II; Quimper, France; Challenger 80 – Hard (i) – 32S/16Q/16D; Singles – Doubles	(United States) Brandon Nakashima; 6–3, 6–4	(Spain) Bernabé Zapata Miralles	(Slovakia) Lukáš Lacko (Germany) Peter Gojowczyk	(Germany) Maximilian Marterer (Italy) Federico Gaio (France) Maxime Janvier (Germany) Tobias Kamke
February 1	Open Quimper Bretagne II; Quimper, France; Challenger 80 – Hard (i) – 32S/16Q/16D; Singles – Doubles	(Belgium) Ruben Bemelmans (Germany) Daniel Masur; 6–2, 6–1	(United States) Brandon Nakashima (United States) Hunter Reese	(Slovakia) Lukáš Lacko (Germany) Peter Gojowczyk	(Germany) Maximilian Marterer (Italy) Federico Gaio (France) Maxime Janvier (Germany) Tobias Kamke
February 1	Antalya Challenger II; Antalya, Turkey; Challenger 80 – Clay – 32S/16Q/16D; Singles – Doubles	(Spain) Carlos Taberner; 6–4, 6–1	(Spain) Jaume Munar	(Argentina) Tomás Martín Etcheverry (Italy) Alessandro Giannessi	(Argentina) Facundo Bagnis (Argentina) Leonardo Mayer (Chile) Alejandro Tabilo (Slovakia) Jozef Kovalík
February 1	Antalya Challenger II; Antalya, Turkey; Challenger 80 – Clay – 32S/16Q/16D; Singles – Doubles	(Ukraine) Denys Molchanov (Kazakhstan) Aleksandr Nedovyesov; 6–4, 7–6^{(7–2)}	(United States) Robert Galloway (United States) Alex Lawson	(Argentina) Tomás Martín Etcheverry (Italy) Alessandro Giannessi	(Argentina) Facundo Bagnis (Argentina) Leonardo Mayer (Chile) Alejandro Tabilo (Slovakia) Jozef Kovalík
February 8	Challenger La Manche; Cherbourg, France; Challenger 100 – Hard (i) – 32S/16Q/16D; Singles – Doubles	(Belgium) Ruben Bemelmans; 6–4, 6–4	(Czech Republic) Lukáš Rosol	(France) Arthur Rinderknech (France) Hugo Gaston	(Belgium) Michael Geerts (France) Constant Lestienne (Slovakia) Lukáš Klein (Poland) Kacper Żuk
February 8	Challenger La Manche; Cherbourg, France; Challenger 100 – Hard (i) – 32S/16Q/16D; Singles – Doubles	(Slovakia) Lukáš Klein (Slovakia) Alex Molčan; 1–6, 7–5, [10–6]	(France) Antoine Hoang (France) Albano Olivetti	(France) Arthur Rinderknech (France) Hugo Gaston	(Belgium) Michael Geerts (France) Constant Lestienne (Slovakia) Lukáš Klein (Poland) Kacper Żuk
February 8	Potchefstroom Open; Potchefstroom, South Africa; Challenger 80 – Hard – 32S/16Q/16D; Singles – Doubles	(France) Benjamin Bonzi; 7–5, 6–4	(United Kingdom) Liam Broady	(Turkey) Cem İlkel (United States) Nick Chappell	(Bulgaria) Dimitar Kuzmanov (Chinese Taipei) Tseng Chun-hsin (Canada) Peter Polansky (Bosnia and Herzegovina) Mirza Bašić
February 8	Potchefstroom Open; Potchefstroom, South Africa; Challenger 80 – Hard – 32S/16Q/16D; Singles – Doubles	(Switzerland) Marc-Andrea Hüsler (Czech Republic) Zdeněk Kolář; 6–4, 2–6, [10–4]	(Canada) Peter Polansky (Canada) Brayden Schnur	(Turkey) Cem İlkel (United States) Nick Chappell	(Bulgaria) Dimitar Kuzmanov (Chinese Taipei) Tseng Chun-hsin (Canada) Peter Polansky (Bosnia and Herzegovina) Mirza Bašić
February 8	Biella Challenger Indoor; Biella, Italy; Challenger 80 – Hard (i) – 32S/16Q/16D; Singles – Doubles	(Ukraine) Illya Marchenko; 6–2, 6–4	(United Kingdom) Andy Murray	(France) Mathias Bourgue (Italy) Federico Gaio	(Slovenia) Blaž Rola (Germany) Matthias Bachinger (Italy) Lorenzo Giustino (Germany) Daniel Masur
February 8	Biella Challenger Indoor; Biella, Italy; Challenger 80 – Hard (i) – 32S/16Q/16D; Singles – Doubles	(Venezuela) Luis David Martínez (Spain) David Vega Hernández; 6–4, 3–6, [10–8]	(Poland) Szymon Walków (Poland) Jan Zieliński	(France) Mathias Bourgue (Italy) Federico Gaio	(Slovenia) Blaž Rola (Germany) Matthias Bachinger (Italy) Lorenzo Giustino (Germany) Daniel Masur
February 15	Biella Challenger Indoor II; Biella, Italy; Challenger 125 – Hard (i) – 32S/16Q/16D; Singles – Doubles	(South Korea) Kwon Soon-woo; 6–2, 6–3	(Italy) Lorenzo Musetti	(Russia) Evgeny Donskoy (Italy) Andreas Seppi	(Italy) Federico Gaio (Germany) Yannick Maden (Ukraine) Illya Marchenko (Latvia) Ernests Gulbis
February 15	Biella Challenger Indoor II; Biella, Italy; Challenger 125 – Hard (i) – 32S/16Q/16D; Singles – Doubles	(Monaco) Hugo Nys (Germany) Tim Pütz; 7–6^{(7–4)}, 6–3	(United Kingdom) Lloyd Glasspool (Finland) Harri Heliövaara	(Russia) Evgeny Donskoy (Italy) Andreas Seppi	(Italy) Federico Gaio (Germany) Yannick Maden (Ukraine) Illya Marchenko (Latvia) Ernests Gulbis
February 15	Challenger Concepción; Concepción, Chile; Challenger 80 – Clay – 32S/16Q/16D; Singles – Doubles	(Argentina) Sebastián Báez; 6–3, 6–7^{(5–7)}, 7–6^{(7–5)}	(Argentina) Francisco Cerúndolo	(Chile) Alejandro Tabilo (Slovakia) Andrej Martin	(Argentina) Federico Coria (Brazil) Thiago Seyboth Wild (Bolivia) Hugo Dellien (Germany) Daniel Altmaier
February 15	Challenger Concepción; Concepción, Chile; Challenger 80 – Clay – 32S/16Q/16D; Singles – Doubles	(Brazil) Orlando Luz (Brazil) Rafael Matos; 7–5, 6–4	(Peru) Sergio Galdós (Ecuador) Diego Hidalgo	(Chile) Alejandro Tabilo (Slovakia) Andrej Martin	(Argentina) Federico Coria (Brazil) Thiago Seyboth Wild (Bolivia) Hugo Dellien (Germany) Daniel Altmaier
February 15	Potchefstroom Open II; Potchefstroom, South Africa; Challenger 80 – Hard – 32S/16Q/16D; Singles – Doubles	(United States) Jenson Brooksby; 2–6, 6–3, 6–0	(Russia) Teymuraz Gabashvili	(United Kingdom) Liam Broady (Austria) Lucas Miedler	(Australia) Akira Santillan (Spain) Adrián Menéndez Maceiras (Bulgaria) Dimitar Kuzmanov (Turkey) Cem İlkel
February 15	Potchefstroom Open II; Potchefstroom, South Africa; Challenger 80 – Hard – 32S/16Q/16D; Singles – Doubles	(South Africa) Raven Klaasen (South Africa) Ruan Roelofse; 6–4, 6–4	(Belgium) Julien Cagnina (Czech Republic) Zdeněk Kolář	(United Kingdom) Liam Broady (Austria) Lucas Miedler	(Australia) Akira Santillan (Spain) Adrián Menéndez Maceiras (Bulgaria) Dimitar Kuzmanov (Turkey) Cem İlkel
February 22	Nur-Sultan Challenger; Nur-Sultan, Kazakhstan; Challenger 100 – Hard (i) – 32S/16Q/16D; Singles – Doubles	(United States) Mackenzie McDonald; 6–1, 6–2	(Austria) Jurij Rodionov	(Switzerland) Henri Laaksonen (India) Prajnesh Gunneswaran	(Portugal) Frederico Ferreira Silva (Poland) Kacper Żuk (Slovakia) Martin Kližan (Czech Republic) Tomáš Macháč
February 22	Nur-Sultan Challenger; Nur-Sultan, Kazakhstan; Challenger 100 – Hard (i) – 32S/16Q/16D; Singles – Doubles	(Ukraine) Denys Molchanov (Kazakhstan) Aleksandr Nedovyesov; 6–4, 6–4	(United States) Nathan Pasha (United States) Max Schnur	(Switzerland) Henri Laaksonen (India) Prajnesh Gunneswaran	(Portugal) Frederico Ferreira Silva (Poland) Kacper Żuk (Slovakia) Martin Kližan (Czech Republic) Tomáš Macháč
February 22	Gran Canaria Challenger; Las Palmas, Spain; Challenger 80 – Clay – 32S/16Q/16D; Singles – Doubles	(France) Enzo Couacaud; 7–6^{(7–5)}, 7–6^{(7–3)}	(Canada) Steven Diez	(Slovakia) Alex Molčan (Serbia) Nikola Milojević	(Slovakia) Filip Horanský (Italy) Riccardo Bonadio (Italy) Andrea Pellegrino (Argentina) Marco Trungelliti
February 22	Gran Canaria Challenger; Las Palmas, Spain; Challenger 80 – Clay – 32S/16Q/16D; Singles – Doubles	(United Kingdom) Lloyd Glasspool (Finland) Harri Heliövaara; 7–5, 6–1	(Belgium) Kimmer Coppejans (Spain) Sergio Martos Gornés	(Slovakia) Alex Molčan (Serbia) Nikola Milojević	(Slovakia) Filip Horanský (Italy) Riccardo Bonadio (Italy) Andrea Pellegrino (Argentina) Marco Trungelliti

=== March ===
Week of	Tournament	Champions	Runners-up	Semifinalists	Quarterfinalists
March 1	Nur-Sultan Challenger II; Nur-Sultan, Kazakhstan; Challenger 125 – Hard (i) – 32S/16Q/16D; Singles – Doubles	(Czech Republic) Tomáš Macháč; 4–6, 6–4, 6–4	(Austria) Sebastian Ofner	(India) Prajnesh Gunneswaran (Japan) Taro Daniel	(South Korea) Kwon Soon-woo (Australia) James Duckworth (Portugal) Frederico Ferreira Silva (Chinese Taipei) Wu Tung-lin
March 1	Nur-Sultan Challenger II; Nur-Sultan, Kazakhstan; Challenger 125 – Hard (i) – 32S/16Q/16D; Singles – Doubles	(United States) Nathaniel Lammons (United States) Jackson Withrow; 6–4, 6–2	(United States) Nathan Pasha (United States) Max Schnur	(India) Prajnesh Gunneswaran (Japan) Taro Daniel	(South Korea) Kwon Soon-woo (Australia) James Duckworth (Portugal) Frederico Ferreira Silva (Chinese Taipei) Wu Tung-lin
March 1	Gran Canaria Challenger II; Las Palmas, Spain; Challenger 80 – Clay – 32S/16Q/16D; Singles – Doubles	(Spain) Carlos Gimeno Valero; 6–4, 6–2	(Belgium) Kimmer Coppejans	(Spain) Eduard Esteve Lobato (Slovenia) Blaž Kavčič	(Argentina) Marco Trungelliti (Italy) Giulio Zeppieri (Slovakia) Alex Molčan (Italy) Alessandro Giannessi
March 1	Gran Canaria Challenger II; Las Palmas, Spain; Challenger 80 – Clay – 32S/16Q/16D; Singles – Doubles	(France) Enzo Couacaud (France) Manuel Guinard; 6–1, 6–4	(Spain) Javier Barranco Cosano (Spain) Eduard Esteve Lobato	(Spain) Eduard Esteve Lobato (Slovenia) Blaž Kavčič	(Argentina) Marco Trungelliti (Italy) Giulio Zeppieri (Slovakia) Alex Molčan (Italy) Alessandro Giannessi
March 1	Saint Petersburg Challenger; Saint Petersburg, Russia; Challenger 50 – Hard (i) – 32S/16Q/16D; Singles – Doubles	(Belgium) Zizou Bergs; 6–4, 3–6, 6–4	(Turkey) Altuğ Çelikbilek	(Russia) Artem Dubrivnyy (Czech Republic) Vít Kopřiva	(Netherlands) Jesper de Jong (Russia) Andrey Kuznetsov (Monaco) Lucas Catarina (Turkey) Cem İlkel
March 1	Saint Petersburg Challenger; Saint Petersburg, Russia; Challenger 50 – Hard (i) – 32S/16Q/16D; Singles – Doubles	(United States) Christopher Eubanks (Ecuador) Roberto Quiroz; 6–4, 6–3	(Netherlands) Jesper de Jong (Netherlands) Sem Verbeek	(Russia) Artem Dubrivnyy (Czech Republic) Vít Kopřiva	(Netherlands) Jesper de Jong (Russia) Andrey Kuznetsov (Monaco) Lucas Catarina (Turkey) Cem İlkel
March 8	Biella Challenger Indoor III; Biella, Italy; Challenger 80 – Hard (i) – 32S/16Q/16D; Singles – Doubles	(Italy) Andreas Seppi; 6–2, 6–1	(United Kingdom) Liam Broady	(Ukraine) Illya Marchenko (Netherlands) Robin Haase	(Czech Republic) Jonáš Forejtek (Austria) Jurij Rodionov (Canada) Brayden Schnur (Germany) Peter Gojowczyk
March 8	Biella Challenger Indoor III; Biella, Italy; Challenger 80 – Hard (i) – 32S/16Q/16D; Singles – Doubles	(France) Quentin Halys (France) Tristan Lamasine; 6–1, 2–0 ret.	(Ukraine) Denys Molchanov (Ukraine) Sergiy Stakhovsky	(Ukraine) Illya Marchenko (Netherlands) Robin Haase	(Czech Republic) Jonáš Forejtek (Austria) Jurij Rodionov (Canada) Brayden Schnur (Germany) Peter Gojowczyk
March 8	Saint Petersburg Challenger II; Saint Petersburg, Russia; Challenger 80 – Hard (i) – 32S/16Q/16D; Singles – Doubles	(Russia) Evgenii Tiurnev; 6–4, 6–2	(Poland) Kacper Żuk	(Romania) Marius Copil (Czech Republic) Jiří Lehečka	(Bosnia and Herzegovina) Mirza Bašić (United States) Christopher Eubanks (United States) Jack Sock (Kazakhstan) Dmitry Popko
March 8	Saint Petersburg Challenger II; Saint Petersburg, Russia; Challenger 80 – Hard (i) – 32S/16Q/16D; Singles – Doubles	(Netherlands) Jesper de Jong (Netherlands) Sem Verbeek; 6–1, 3–6, [10–5]	(Russia) Konstantin Kravchuk (Kazakhstan) Denis Yevseyev	(Romania) Marius Copil (Czech Republic) Jiří Lehečka	(Bosnia and Herzegovina) Mirza Bašić (United States) Christopher Eubanks (United States) Jack Sock (Kazakhstan) Dmitry Popko
March 15	Biella Challenger Indoor IV; Biella, Italy; Challenger 80 – Hard (i) – 32S/16Q/16D; Singles – Doubles	(Germany) Daniel Masur; 6–3, 6–7^{(8–10)}, 7–5	(Germany) Matthias Bachinger	(Ukraine) Illya Marchenko (France) Benjamin Bonzi	(France) Grégoire Barrère (Ukraine) Sergiy Stakhovsky (Austria) Sebastian Ofner (France) Mathias Bourgue
March 15	Biella Challenger Indoor IV; Biella, Italy; Challenger 80 – Hard (i) – 32S/16Q/16D; Singles – Doubles	(United Kingdom) Lloyd Glasspool (Australia) Matt Reid; 6–3, 6–4	(Ukraine) Denys Molchanov (Ukraine) Sergiy Stakhovsky	(Ukraine) Illya Marchenko (France) Benjamin Bonzi	(France) Grégoire Barrère (Ukraine) Sergiy Stakhovsky (Austria) Sebastian Ofner (France) Mathias Bourgue
March 15	Challenger de Santiago; Santiago, Chile; Challenger 80 – Clay – 32S/16Q/16D; Singles – Doubles	(Argentina) Sebastián Báez; 6–3, 7–6^{(7–4)}	(Chile) Marcelo Tomás Barrios Vera	(Brazil) Felipe Meligeni Alves (Peru) Juan Pablo Varillas	(Chile) Gonzalo Lama (Argentina) Nicolás Kicker (Argentina) Camilo Ugo Carabelli (Chile) Nicolás Jarry
March 15	Challenger de Santiago; Santiago, Chile; Challenger 80 – Clay – 32S/16Q/16D; Singles – Doubles	(Venezuela) Luis David Martínez (Portugal) Gonçalo Oliveira; 7–5, 6–1	(Brazil) Rafael Matos (Brazil) Felipe Meligeni Alves	(Brazil) Felipe Meligeni Alves (Peru) Juan Pablo Varillas	(Chile) Gonzalo Lama (Argentina) Nicolás Kicker (Argentina) Camilo Ugo Carabelli (Chile) Nicolás Jarry
March 15	Cleveland Open; Cleveland, United States; Challenger 80 – Hard (i) – 32S/16Q/16D; Singles – Doubles	(United States) Bjorn Fratangelo; 7–5, 6–4	(United States) Jenson Brooksby	(Ecuador) Emilio Gómez (United States) Aleksandar Kovacevic	(United States) Michael Redlicki (United States) Christopher Eubanks (Japan) Yosuke Watanuki (Canada) Alexis Galarneau
March 15	Cleveland Open; Cleveland, United States; Challenger 80 – Hard (i) – 32S/16Q/16D; Singles – Doubles	(United States) Robert Galloway (United States) Alex Lawson; 7–5, 6–7^{(5–7)}, [11–9]	(United States) Evan King (United States) Hunter Reese	(Ecuador) Emilio Gómez (United States) Aleksandar Kovacevic	(United States) Michael Redlicki (United States) Christopher Eubanks (Japan) Yosuke Watanuki (Canada) Alexis Galarneau
March 22	Play In Challenger; Lille, France; Challenger 90 – Hard (i) – 32S/16Q/16D; Singles – Doubles	(Belgium) Zizou Bergs; 4–6, 6–1, 7–6^{(7–5)}	(France) Grégoire Barrère	(France) Maxime Janvier (France) Quentin Halys	(Czech Republic) Jonáš Forejtek (France) Arthur Rinderknech (Italy) Andrea Arnaboldi (France) Benjamin Bonzi
March 22	Play In Challenger; Lille, France; Challenger 90 – Hard (i) – 32S/16Q/16D; Singles – Doubles	(France) Benjamin Bonzi (France) Antoine Hoang; 6–3, 6–1	(France) Dan Added (Belgium) Michael Geerts	(France) Maxime Janvier (France) Quentin Halys	(Czech Republic) Jonáš Forejtek (France) Arthur Rinderknech (Italy) Andrea Arnaboldi (France) Benjamin Bonzi
March 22	Challenger Città di Lugano; Lugano, Switzerland; Challenger 80 – Hard (i) – 32S/16Q/16D; Singles – Doubles	(Switzerland) Dominic Stricker; 6–4, 6–2	(Ukraine) Vitaliy Sachko	(Japan) Yūichi Sugita (Turkey) Altuğ Çelikbilek	(Russia) Evgeny Karlovskiy (Germany) Daniel Masur (Russia) Roman Safiullin (France) Hugo Grenier
March 22	Challenger Città di Lugano; Lugano, Switzerland; Challenger 80 – Hard (i) – 32S/16Q/16D; Singles – Doubles	(Germany) Andre Begemann (Italy) Andrea Vavassori; 7–6^{(13–11)}, 4–6, [10–8]	(Ukraine) Denys Molchanov (Ukraine) Sergiy Stakhovsky	(Japan) Yūichi Sugita (Turkey) Altuğ Çelikbilek	(Russia) Evgeny Karlovskiy (Germany) Daniel Masur (Russia) Roman Safiullin (France) Hugo Grenier
March 22	Zadar Open; Zadar, Croatia; Challenger 80 – Clay – 32S/16Q/16D; Singles – Doubles	(Serbia) Nikola Milojević; 2–6, 6–2, 7–6^{(7–5)}	(Bulgaria) Dimitar Kuzmanov	(Slovakia) Lukáš Klein (Bosnia and Herzegovina) Nerman Fatić	(Italy) Gianluca Mager (Czech Republic) Vít Kopřiva (Slovenia) Blaž Kavčič (India) Sumit Nagal
March 22	Zadar Open; Zadar, Croatia; Challenger 80 – Clay – 32S/16Q/16D; Singles – Doubles	(Slovenia) Blaž Kavčič (Slovenia) Blaž Rola; 2–6, 6–2, [10–3]	(Slovakia) Lukáš Klein (Slovakia) Alex Molčan	(Slovakia) Lukáš Klein (Bosnia and Herzegovina) Nerman Fatić	(Italy) Gianluca Mager (Czech Republic) Vít Kopřiva (Slovenia) Blaž Kavčič (India) Sumit Nagal
March 29	Andalucía Challenger; Marbella, Spain; Challenger 80 – Clay – 32S/16Q/16D; Singles – Doubles	(Italy) Gianluca Mager; 2–6, 6–3, 6–2	(Spain) Jaume Munar	(Italy) Alessandro Giannessi (Spain) Mario Vilella Martínez	(Slovakia) Martin Kližan (Italy) Roberto Marcora (Japan) Taro Daniel (Serbia) Nikola Milojević
March 29	Andalucía Challenger; Marbella, Spain; Challenger 80 – Clay – 32S/16Q/16D; Singles – Doubles	(United Kingdom) Dominic Inglot (Australia) Matt Reid; 1–6, 6–3, [10–6]	(Monaco) Romain Arneodo (Monaco) Hugo Nys	(Italy) Alessandro Giannessi (Spain) Mario Vilella Martínez	(Slovakia) Martin Kližan (Italy) Roberto Marcora (Japan) Taro Daniel (Serbia) Nikola Milojević
March 29	Open de Oeiras; Oeiras, Portugal; Challenger 50 – Clay – 32S/16Q/16D; Singles – Doubles	(Czech Republic) Zdeněk Kolář; 6–4, 7–5	(Portugal) Gastão Elias	(Argentina) Marco Trungelliti (France) Evan Furness	(Netherlands) Igor Sijsling (Portugal) Tiago Cação (Slovakia) Alex Molčan (Italy) Raúl Brancaccio
March 29	Open de Oeiras; Oeiras, Portugal; Challenger 50 – Clay – 32S/16Q/16D; Singles – Doubles	(Germany) Mats Moraing (Germany) Oscar Otte; 6–1, 6–4	(Italy) Riccardo Bonadio (Kazakhstan) Denis Yevseyev	(Argentina) Marco Trungelliti (France) Evan Furness	(Netherlands) Igor Sijsling (Portugal) Tiago Cação (Slovakia) Alex Molčan (Italy) Raúl Brancaccio

=== April ===
Week of	Tournament	Champions	Runners-up	Semifinalists	Quarterfinalists
April 5	Split Open; Split, Croatia; Challenger 80 – Clay – 32S/16Q/16D; Singles – Doubles	(Slovenia) Blaž Rola; 2–6, 6–3, 6–2	(Slovenia) Blaž Kavčič	(Poland) Kacper Żuk (Argentina) Andrea Collarini	(Australia) Thanasi Kokkinakis (Australia) Aleksandar Vukic (Serbia) Danilo Petrović (Bosnia and Herzegovina) Mirza Bašić
April 5	Split Open; Split, Croatia; Challenger 80 – Clay – 32S/16Q/16D; Singles – Doubles	(Kazakhstan) Andrey Golubev (Kazakhstan) Aleksandr Nedovyesov; 7–5, 6–7^{(5–7)}, [10–5]	(Poland) Szymon Walków (Poland) Jan Zieliński	(Poland) Kacper Żuk (Argentina) Andrea Collarini	(Australia) Thanasi Kokkinakis (Australia) Aleksandar Vukic (Serbia) Danilo Petrović (Bosnia and Herzegovina) Mirza Bašić
April 5	Open de Oeiras II; Oeiras, Portugal; Challenger 50 – Clay – 32S/16Q/16D; Singles – Doubles	(Argentina) Pedro Cachin; 7–6^{(7–4)}, 7–6^{(7–3)}	(Portugal) Nuno Borges	(Portugal) Gonçalo Oliveira (Portugal) Gastão Elias	(Portugal) Tiago Cação (Italy) Gian Marco Moroni (Bulgaria) Dimitar Kuzmanov (France) Manuel Guinard
April 5	Open de Oeiras II; Oeiras, Portugal; Challenger 50 – Clay – 32S/16Q/16D; Singles – Doubles	(Portugal) Nuno Borges (Portugal) Francisco Cabral; 6–1, 6–2	(Russia) Pavel Kotov (Chinese Taipei) Tseng Chun-hsin	(Portugal) Gonçalo Oliveira (Portugal) Gastão Elias	(Portugal) Tiago Cação (Italy) Gian Marco Moroni (Bulgaria) Dimitar Kuzmanov (France) Manuel Guinard
April 12	Belgrade Challenger; Belgrade, Serbia; Challenger 125 – Clay – 32S/16Q/16D; Singles – Doubles	(Spain) Roberto Carballés Baena; 6–4, 7–5	(Bosnia and Herzegovina) Damir Džumhur	(United Kingdom) Liam Broady (Slovakia) Jozef Kovalík	(Slovenia) Blaž Rola (United States) Brandon Nakashima (Japan) Taro Daniel (Argentina) Facundo Bagnis
April 12	Belgrade Challenger; Belgrade, Serbia; Challenger 125 – Clay – 32S/16Q/16D; Singles – Doubles	(Argentina) Guillermo Durán (Argentina) Andrés Molteni; 6–4, 6–4	(Bosnia and Herzegovina) Tomislav Brkić (Serbia) Nikola Ćaćić	(United Kingdom) Liam Broady (Slovakia) Jozef Kovalík	(Slovenia) Blaž Rola (United States) Brandon Nakashima (Japan) Taro Daniel (Argentina) Facundo Bagnis
April 12	Orlando Open; Orlando, United States; Challenger 80 – Hard – 32S/16Q/16D; Singles – Doubles	(United States) Jenson Brooksby; 6–3, 6–3	(United States) Denis Kudla	(Dominican Republic) Roberto Cid Subervi (United States) Christian Harrison	(United States) Michael Mmoh (Canada) Brayden Schnur (United States) Jack Sock (United States) Zane Khan
April 12	Orlando Open; Orlando, United States; Challenger 80 – Hard – 32S/16Q/16D; Singles – Doubles	(United States) Mitchell Krueger (United States) Jack Sock; 4–6, 7–5, [13–11]	(United States) Christian Harrison (United States) Dennis Novikov	(Dominican Republic) Roberto Cid Subervi (United States) Christian Harrison	(United States) Michael Mmoh (Canada) Brayden Schnur (United States) Jack Sock (United States) Zane Khan
April 12	Split Open II; Split, Croatia; Challenger 80 – Clay – 32S/16Q/16D; Singles – Doubles	(Poland) Kacper Żuk; 6–4, 6–2	(France) Mathias Bourgue	(France) Quentin Halys (Sweden) Elias Ymer	(Australia) Thanasi Kokkinakis (Bosnia and Herzegovina) Mirza Bašić (Turkey) Cem İlkel (Australia) Aleksandar Vukic
April 12	Split Open II; Split, Croatia; Challenger 80 – Clay – 32S/16Q/16D; Singles – Doubles	(Poland) Szymon Walków (Poland) Jan Zieliński; 6–2, 7–5	(France) Grégoire Barrère (France) Albano Olivetti	(France) Quentin Halys (Sweden) Elias Ymer	(Australia) Thanasi Kokkinakis (Bosnia and Herzegovina) Mirza Bašić (Turkey) Cem İlkel (Australia) Aleksandar Vukic
April 19	Garden Open; Rome, Italy; Challenger 80 – Clay – 32S/16Q/16D; Singles – Doubles	(Italy) Andrea Pellegrino; 3–6, 6–2, 6–1	(France) Hugo Gaston	(Peru) Juan Pablo Varillas (Czech Republic) Vít Kopřiva	(Sweden) Elias Ymer (France) Tristan Lamasine (Austria) Sebastian Ofner (Italy) Lorenzo Giustino
April 19	Garden Open; Rome, Italy; Challenger 80 – Clay – 32S/16Q/16D; Singles – Doubles	(France) Sadio Doumbia (France) Fabien Reboul; 7–6^{(7–5)}, 7–5	(Italy) Paolo Lorenzi (Peru) Juan Pablo Varillas	(Peru) Juan Pablo Varillas (Czech Republic) Vít Kopřiva	(Sweden) Elias Ymer (France) Tristan Lamasine (Austria) Sebastian Ofner (Italy) Lorenzo Giustino
April 19	Tallahassee Tennis Challenger; Tallahassee, United States; Challenger 80 – Clay – 32S/16Q/16D; Singles – Doubles	(United States) Jenson Brooksby; 6–3, 4–6, 6–3	(United States) Bjorn Fratangelo	(Argentina) Facundo Mena (United States) Denis Kudla	(United States) Michael Mmoh (Denmark) Mikael Torpegaard (United States) Thai-Son Kwiatkowski (Romania) Filip Cristian Jianu
April 19	Tallahassee Tennis Challenger; Tallahassee, United States; Challenger 80 – Clay – 32S/16Q/16D; Singles – Doubles	(Brazil) Orlando Luz (Brazil) Rafael Matos; 7–6^{(7–2)}, 6–2	(United States) Sekou Bangoura (United States) Donald Young	(Argentina) Facundo Mena (United States) Denis Kudla	(United States) Michael Mmoh (Denmark) Mikael Torpegaard (United States) Thai-Son Kwiatkowski (Romania) Filip Cristian Jianu
April 19	Salinas Challenger; Salinas, Ecuador; Challenger 80 – Hard – 32S/16Q/16D; Singles – Doubles	(Chile) Nicolás Jarry; 7–6^{(9–7)}, 6–1	(Colombia) Nicolás Mejía	(Turkey) Altuğ Çelikbilek (Argentina) Camilo Ugo Carabelli	(Netherlands) Tim van Rijthoven (Chile) Marcelo Tomás Barrios Vera (Spain) Adrián Menéndez Maceiras (Argentina) Thiago Agustín Tirante
April 19	Salinas Challenger; Salinas, Ecuador; Challenger 80 – Hard – 32S/16Q/16D; Singles – Doubles	(Mexico) Miguel Ángel Reyes-Varela (Brazil) Fernando Romboli; 7–5, 4–6, [10–2]	(Ecuador) Diego Hidalgo (Tunisia) Skander Mansouri	(Turkey) Altuğ Çelikbilek (Argentina) Camilo Ugo Carabelli	(Netherlands) Tim van Rijthoven (Chile) Marcelo Tomás Barrios Vera (Spain) Adrián Menéndez Maceiras (Argentina) Thiago Agustín Tirante
April 26	Garden Open II; Rome, Italy; Challenger 80 – Clay – 32S/16Q/16D; Singles – Doubles	(Argentina) Juan Manuel Cerúndolo; 6–2, 3–6, 6–3	(Italy) Flavio Cobolli	(Turkey) Cem İlkel (Italy) Alessandro Giannessi	(Croatia) Nino Serdarušić (Italy) Andrea Pellegrino (Australia) Thanasi Kokkinakis (Italy) Giulio Zeppieri
April 26	Garden Open II; Rome, Italy; Challenger 80 – Clay – 32S/16Q/16D; Singles – Doubles	(France) Sadio Doumbia (France) Fabien Reboul; 7–5, 6–3	(Argentina) Guido Andreozzi (Argentina) Guillermo Durán	(Turkey) Cem İlkel (Italy) Alessandro Giannessi	(Croatia) Nino Serdarušić (Italy) Andrea Pellegrino (Australia) Thanasi Kokkinakis (Italy) Giulio Zeppieri
April 26	Ostrava Challenger; Ostrava, Czech Republic; Challenger 80 – Clay – 32S/16Q/16D; Singles – Doubles	(France) Benjamin Bonzi; 6–4, 6–4	(Argentina) Renzo Olivo	(France) Arthur Rinderknech (Sweden) Elias Ymer	(Argentina) Tomás Martín Etcheverry (Slovakia) Lukáš Klein (Australia) Marc Polmans (Slovakia) Alex Molčan
April 26	Ostrava Challenger; Ostrava, Czech Republic; Challenger 80 – Clay – 32S/16Q/16D; Singles – Doubles	(Australia) Marc Polmans (Ukraine) Sergiy Stakhovsky; 7–6^{(7–4)}, 3–6, [10–7]	(Czech Republic) Andrew Paulson (Czech Republic) Patrik Rikl	(France) Arthur Rinderknech (Sweden) Elias Ymer	(Argentina) Tomás Martín Etcheverry (Slovakia) Lukáš Klein (Australia) Marc Polmans (Slovakia) Alex Molčan
April 26	Salinas Challenger II; Salinas, Ecuador; Challenger 50 – Hard – 32S/16Q/16D; Singles – Doubles	(Ecuador) Emilio Gómez; 4–6, 7–6^{(8–6)}, 6–4	(Chile) Nicolás Jarry	(Argentina) Thiago Agustín Tirante (Argentina) Agustín Velotti	(Japan) Hiroki Moriya (United States) JC Aragone (United States) Kevin King (Colombia) Nicolás Mejía
April 26	Salinas Challenger II; Salinas, Ecuador; Challenger 50 – Hard – 32S/16Q/16D; Singles – Doubles	(Colombia) Nicolás Barrientos (Peru) Sergio Galdós; Walkover	(Ecuador) Antonio Cayetano March (Argentina) Thiago Agustín Tirante	(Argentina) Thiago Agustín Tirante (Argentina) Agustín Velotti	(Japan) Hiroki Moriya (United States) JC Aragone (United States) Kevin King (Colombia) Nicolás Mejía

=== May ===
Week of	Tournament	Champions	Runners-up	Semifinalists	Quarterfinalists
May 3	Biella Challenger V Biella, Italy; Challenger 80 – Clay – 32S/16Q/16D; Singles – Doubles	(Peru) Juan Pablo Varillas; 6–3, 6–1	(Argentina) Guido Andreozzi	(France) Alexandre Müller (Argentina) Andrea Collarini	(Brazil) João Menezes (Argentina) Leonardo Mayer (United Kingdom) Jay Clarke (Italy) Federico Gaio
May 3	Biella Challenger V Biella, Italy; Challenger 80 – Clay – 32S/16Q/16D; Singles – Doubles	(Sweden) André Göransson (United States) Nathaniel Lammons; 7–6^{(7–3)}, 6–3	(Brazil) Rafael Matos (Brazil) Felipe Meligeni Alves	(France) Alexandre Müller (Argentina) Andrea Collarini	(Brazil) João Menezes (Argentina) Leonardo Mayer (United Kingdom) Jay Clarke (Italy) Federico Gaio
May 3	I.ČLTK Prague Open; Prague, Czech Republic; Challenger 80 – Clay – 32S/16Q/16D; Singles – Doubles	(Netherlands) Tallon Griekspoor; 5–7, 6–4, 6–4	(Germany) Oscar Otte	(Slovakia) Norbert Gombos (Czech Republic) Michael Vrbenský	(India) Sumit Nagal (Portugal) Frederico Ferreira Silva (Czech Republic) Vít Kopřiva (United States) Maxime Cressy
May 3	I.ČLTK Prague Open; Prague, Czech Republic; Challenger 80 – Clay – 32S/16Q/16D; Singles – Doubles	(Australia) Marc Polmans (Ukraine) Sergiy Stakhovsky; 6–3, 6–4	(Croatia) Ivan Sabanov (Croatia) Matej Sabanov	(Slovakia) Norbert Gombos (Czech Republic) Michael Vrbenský	(India) Sumit Nagal (Portugal) Frederico Ferreira Silva (Czech Republic) Vít Kopřiva (United States) Maxime Cressy
May 10	Heilbronner Neckarcup; Heilbronn, Germany; Challenger 100 – Clay – 32S/16Q/16D; Singles – Doubles	(Spain) Bernabé Zapata Miralles; 6–3, 6–4	(Colombia) Daniel Elahi Galán	(Austria) Dennis Novak (United States) Mackenzie McDonald	(India) Sumit Nagal (Japan) Taro Daniel (Germany) Philipp Kohlschreiber (Brazil) João Menezes
May 10	Heilbronner Neckarcup; Heilbronn, Germany; Challenger 100 – Clay – 32S/16Q/16D; Singles – Doubles	(United States) Nathaniel Lammons (United States) Jackson Withrow; 6–7^{(4–7)}, 6–4, [10–8]	(Sweden) André Göransson (Netherlands) Sem Verbeek	(Austria) Dennis Novak (United States) Mackenzie McDonald	(India) Sumit Nagal (Japan) Taro Daniel (Germany) Philipp Kohlschreiber (Brazil) João Menezes
May 10	Zagreb Open; Zagreb, Croatia; Challenger 80 – Clay – 32S/16Q/16D; Singles – Doubles	(Argentina) Sebastián Báez; 3–6, 6–3, 6–1	(Peru) Juan Pablo Varillas	(Argentina) Juan Manuel Cerúndolo (Chile) Marcelo Tomás Barrios Vera	(Netherlands) Botic van de Zandschulp (Serbia) Nikola Milojević (Brazil) Thiago Seyboth Wild (Spain) Pedro Martínez
May 10	Zagreb Open; Zagreb, Croatia; Challenger 80 – Clay – 32S/16Q/16D; Singles – Doubles	(United States) Evan King (United States) Hunter Reese; 6–2, 7–6^{(7–4)}	(Kazakhstan) Andrey Golubev (Kazakhstan) Aleksandr Nedovyesov	(Argentina) Juan Manuel Cerúndolo (Chile) Marcelo Tomás Barrios Vera	(Netherlands) Botic van de Zandschulp (Serbia) Nikola Milojević (Brazil) Thiago Seyboth Wild (Spain) Pedro Martínez
May 17	Open de Oeiras III; Oeiras, Portugal; Challenger 125 – Clay – 32S/16Q/16D; Singles – Doubles	(Spain) Carlos Alcaraz; 6–4, 6–4	(Argentina) Facundo Bagnis	(Japan) Taro Daniel (France) Hugo Gaston	(Bolivia) Hugo Dellien (Portugal) Gastão Elias (Portugal) Nuno Borges (Portugal) Pedro Sousa
May 17	Open de Oeiras III; Oeiras, Portugal; Challenger 125 – Clay – 32S/16Q/16D; Singles – Doubles	(United States) Hunter Reese (Netherlands) Sem Verbeek; 4–6, 6–4, [10–7]	(France) Sadio Doumbia (France) Fabien Reboul	(Japan) Taro Daniel (France) Hugo Gaston	(Bolivia) Hugo Dellien (Portugal) Gastão Elias (Portugal) Nuno Borges (Portugal) Pedro Sousa
May 17	Biella Challenger VI; Biella, Italy; Challenger 50 – Clay – 32S/16Q/16D; Singles – Doubles	(Australia) Thanasi Kokkinakis; 6–3, 6–4	(France) Enzo Couacaud	(Argentina) Tomás Martín Etcheverry (China) Zhang Zhizhen	(Argentina) Facundo Mena (United States) Bjorn Fratangelo (France) Alexandre Müller (United States) Thai-Son Kwiatkowski
May 17	Biella Challenger VI; Biella, Italy; Challenger 50 – Clay – 32S/16Q/16D; Singles – Doubles	(United States) Evan King (Germany) Julian Lenz; 3–6, 6–3, [11–9]	(Poland) Karol Drzewiecki (Spain) Sergio Martos Gornés	(Argentina) Tomás Martín Etcheverry (China) Zhang Zhizhen	(Argentina) Facundo Mena (United States) Bjorn Fratangelo (France) Alexandre Müller (United States) Thai-Son Kwiatkowski
May 24	Open de Oeiras IV; Oeiras, Portugal; Challenger 50 – Clay – 32S/16Q/16D; Singles – Doubles	(Portugal) Gastão Elias; 5–7, 6–4, 6–4	(Denmark) Holger Rune	(Portugal) Nuno Borges (Kazakhstan) Timofey Skatov	(Argentina) Camilo Ugo Carabelli (Romania) Filip Jianu (Spain) Carlos Gimeno Valero (Spain) Nikolás Sánchez Izquierdo
May 24	Open de Oeiras IV; Oeiras, Portugal; Challenger 50 – Clay – 32S/16Q/16D; Singles – Doubles	(Netherlands) Jesper de Jong (Netherlands) Tim van Rijthoven; 6–1, 7–6^{(7–3)}	(Germany) Julian Lenz (Ecuador) Roberto Quiroz	(Portugal) Nuno Borges (Kazakhstan) Timofey Skatov	(Argentina) Camilo Ugo Carabelli (Romania) Filip Jianu (Spain) Carlos Gimeno Valero (Spain) Nikolás Sánchez Izquierdo
May 31	Little Rock Challenger; Little Rock, United States; Challenger 80 – Hard – 32S/16Q/16D; Singles – Doubles	(United States) Jack Sock; 7–5, 6–4	(Ecuador) Emilio Gómez	(United States) Mitchell Krueger (Portugal) Gonçalo Oliveira	(Chinese Taipei) Jason Jung (United States) Thai-Son Kwiatkowski (United States) Ulises Blanch (United States) Oliver Crawford
May 31	Little Rock Challenger; Little Rock, United States; Challenger 80 – Hard – 32S/16Q/16D; Singles – Doubles	(Colombia) Nicolás Barrientos (United States) Ernesto Escobedo; 4–6, 6–3, [10–5]	(United States) Christopher Eubanks (Ecuador) Roberto Quiroz	(United States) Mitchell Krueger (Portugal) Gonçalo Oliveira	(Chinese Taipei) Jason Jung (United States) Thai-Son Kwiatkowski (United States) Ulises Blanch (United States) Oliver Crawford
May 31	Biella Challenger VII; Biella, Italy; Challenger 80 – Clay – 32S/16Q/16D; Singles – Doubles	(Denmark) Holger Rune; 6–3, 5–7, 7–6^{(7–5)}	(Argentina) Marco Trungelliti	(Brazil) Felipe Meligeni Alves (Argentina) Tomás Martín Etcheverry	(Argentina) Renzo Olivo (Italy) Jacopo Berrettini (France) Alexandre Müller (Poland) Kacper Żuk
May 31	Biella Challenger VII; Biella, Italy; Challenger 80 – Clay – 32S/16Q/16D; Singles – Doubles	(Argentina) Tomás Martín Etcheverry (Argentina) Renzo Olivo; 3–6, 6–3, [10–8]	(Venezuela) Luis David Martínez (Spain) David Vega Hernández	(Brazil) Felipe Meligeni Alves (Argentina) Tomás Martín Etcheverry	(Argentina) Renzo Olivo (Italy) Jacopo Berrettini (France) Alexandre Müller (Poland) Kacper Żuk

=== June ===
Week of	Tournament	Champions	Runners-up	Semifinalists	Quarterfinalists
June 7	Nottingham Open; Nottingham, United Kingdom; Challenger 125 – Grass – 32S/16Q/16D; Singles – Doubles	(United States) Frances Tiafoe; 6–1, 6–3	(United States) Denis Kudla	(Poland) Kamil Majchrzak (Romania) Marius Copil	(United Kingdom) Dan Evans (Italy) Andreas Seppi (South Africa) Kevin Anderson (Russia) Evgeny Donskoy
June 7	Nottingham Open; Nottingham, United Kingdom; Challenger 125 – Grass – 32S/16Q/16D; Singles – Doubles	(Australia) Matt Reid (United Kingdom) Ken Skupski; 4–6, 7–5, [10–6]	(Australia) Matthew Ebden (Australia) John-Patrick Smith	(Poland) Kamil Majchrzak (Romania) Marius Copil	(United Kingdom) Dan Evans (Italy) Andreas Seppi (South Africa) Kevin Anderson (Russia) Evgeny Donskoy
June 7	Open Sopra Steria de Lyon; Lyon, France; Challenger 100 – Clay – 32S/16Q/16D; Singles – Doubles	(Uruguay) Pablo Cuevas; 6–2, 6–2	(Sweden) Elias Ymer	(Argentina) Facundo Bagnis (Japan) Taro Daniel	(Italy) Andrea Pellegrino (Germany) Cedrik-Marcel Stebe (Germany) Daniel Altmaier (Denmark) Holger Rune
June 7	Open Sopra Steria de Lyon; Lyon, France; Challenger 100 – Clay – 32S/16Q/16D; Singles – Doubles	(Uruguay) Martín Cuevas (Uruguay) Pablo Cuevas; 6–3, 7–6^{(7–2)}	(France) Tristan Lamasine (France) Albano Olivetti	(Argentina) Facundo Bagnis (Japan) Taro Daniel	(Italy) Andrea Pellegrino (Germany) Cedrik-Marcel Stebe (Germany) Daniel Altmaier (Denmark) Holger Rune
June 7	Slovak Open; Bratislava, Slovakia; Challenger 90 – Clay – 32S/16Q/16D; Singles – Doubles	(Netherlands) Tallon Griekspoor; 7–6^{(8–6)}, 6–3	(Argentina) Sebastián Báez	(Slovakia) Filip Horanský (Slovakia) Martin Kližan	(Turkey) Cem İlkel (Germany) Matthias Bachinger (Russia) Andrey Kuznetsov (Czech Republic) Jiří Lehečka
June 7	Slovak Open; Bratislava, Slovakia; Challenger 90 – Clay – 32S/16Q/16D; Singles – Doubles	(Ukraine) Denys Molchanov (Kazakhstan) Aleksandr Nedovyesov; 7–6^{(7–5)}, 6–1	(Netherlands) Sander Arends (Venezuela) Luis David Martínez	(Slovakia) Filip Horanský (Slovakia) Martin Kližan	(Turkey) Cem İlkel (Germany) Matthias Bachinger (Russia) Andrey Kuznetsov (Czech Republic) Jiří Lehečka
June 7	Almaty Challenger; Almaty, Kazakhstan; Challenger 80 – Clay – 32S/16Q/16D; Singles – Doubles	(Belgium) Zizou Bergs; 4–6, 6–3, 6–2	(Kazakhstan) Timofey Skatov	(Kazakhstan) Dmitry Popko (Chinese Taipei) Tseng Chun-hsin	(Slovakia) Andrej Martin (Belgium) Kimmer Coppejans (Bulgaria) Dimitar Kuzmanov (France) Evan Furness
June 7	Almaty Challenger; Almaty, Kazakhstan; Challenger 80 – Clay – 32S/16Q/16D; Singles – Doubles	(Netherlands) Jesper de Jong (Ukraine) Vitaliy Sachko; 7–6^{(7–4)}, 6–1	(Ukraine) Vladyslav Manafov (Russia) Evgenii Tiurnev	(Kazakhstan) Dmitry Popko (Chinese Taipei) Tseng Chun-hsin	(Slovakia) Andrej Martin (Belgium) Kimmer Coppejans (Bulgaria) Dimitar Kuzmanov (France) Evan Furness
June 7	Orlando Open II; Orlando, United States; Challenger 80 – Hard – 32S/16Q/16D; Singles – Doubles	(United States) Christopher Eubanks; 2–6, 7–6^{(7–3)}, 6–4	(Colombia) Nicolás Mejía	(United States) JC Aragone (United States) Sam Riffice	(Ecuador) Emilio Gómez (United States) Jenson Brooksby (United States) Ulises Blanch (Chile) Nicolás Jarry
June 7	Orlando Open II; Orlando, United States; Challenger 80 – Hard – 32S/16Q/16D; Singles – Doubles	(United States) Christian Harrison (Canada) Peter Polansky; 6–2, 6–3	(United States) JC Aragone (Colombia) Nicolás Barrientos	(United States) JC Aragone (United States) Sam Riffice	(Ecuador) Emilio Gómez (United States) Jenson Brooksby (United States) Ulises Blanch (Chile) Nicolás Jarry
June 14	Nottingham Trophy; Nottingham, United Kingdom; Challenger 125 – Grass – 32S/16Q/16D; Singles – Doubles	(Australia) Alex Bolt; 4–6, 6–4, 6–3	(Poland) Kamil Majchrzak	(United States) Mackenzie McDonald (France) Benjamin Bonzi	(France) Richard Gasquet (United Kingdom) Anton Matusevich (United States) Denis Kudla (Bosnia and Herzegovina) Damir Džumhur
June 14	Nottingham Trophy; Nottingham, United Kingdom; Challenger 125 – Grass – 32S/16Q/16D; Singles – Doubles	(Australia) Marc Polmans (Australia) Matt Reid; 6–4, 4–6, [10–8]	(France) Benjamin Bonzi (France) Antoine Hoang	(United States) Mackenzie McDonald (France) Benjamin Bonzi	(France) Richard Gasquet (United Kingdom) Anton Matusevich (United States) Denis Kudla (Bosnia and Herzegovina) Damir Džumhur
June 14	Open du Pays d'Aix; Aix-en-Provence, France; Challenger 125 – Clay – 32S/16Q/16D; Singles – Doubles	(Spain) Carlos Taberner; 6–2, 6–2	(France) Manuel Guinard	(Sweden) Elias Ymer (France) Kyrian Jacquet	(France) Tristan Lamasine (Germany) Oscar Otte (Argentina) Renzo Olivo (France) Titouan Droguet
June 14	Open du Pays d'Aix; Aix-en-Provence, France; Challenger 125 – Clay – 32S/16Q/16D; Singles – Doubles	(France) Sadio Doumbia (France) Fabien Reboul; 6–7^{(4–7)}, 7–5, [10–4]	(United States) Robert Galloway (United States) Alex Lawson	(Sweden) Elias Ymer (France) Kyrian Jacquet	(France) Tristan Lamasine (Germany) Oscar Otte (Argentina) Renzo Olivo (France) Titouan Droguet
June 14	Moneta Czech Open; Prostějov, Czech Republic; Challenger 100 – Clay – 32S/16Q/16D; Singles – Doubles	(Argentina) Federico Coria; 7–6^{(7–1)}, 6–3	(Slovakia) Alex Molčan	(Italy) Gianluca Mager (Czech Republic) Zdeněk Kolář	(Bolivia) Hugo Dellien (Czech Republic) Dalibor Svrčina (Slovenia) Blaž Rola (Germany) Tobias Kamke
June 14	Moneta Czech Open; Prostějov, Czech Republic; Challenger 100 – Clay – 32S/16Q/16D; Singles – Doubles	(Kazakhstan) Aleksandr Nedovyesov (Portugal) Gonçalo Oliveira; 1–6, 7–6^{(7–5)}, [10–6]	(Czech Republic) Roman Jebavý (Czech Republic) Zdeněk Kolář	(Italy) Gianluca Mager (Czech Republic) Zdeněk Kolář	(Bolivia) Hugo Dellien (Czech Republic) Dalibor Svrčina (Slovenia) Blaž Rola (Germany) Tobias Kamke
June 14	Almaty Challenger II; Almaty, Kazakhstan; Challenger 80 – Clay – 32S/16Q/16D; Singles – Doubles	(Netherlands) Jesper de Jong; 6–1, 6–2	(Chile) Marcelo Tomás Barrios Vera	(Slovakia) Andrej Martin (Bosnia and Herzegovina) Mirza Bašić	(Canada) Brayden Schnur (Russia) Pavel Kotov (Italy) Riccardo Bonadio (Italy) Gian Marco Moroni
June 14	Almaty Challenger II; Almaty, Kazakhstan; Challenger 80 – Clay – 32S/16Q/16D; Singles – Doubles	(Ukraine) Vladyslav Manafov (Ukraine) Vitaliy Sachko; 6–1, 6–4	(France) Corentin Denolly (Spain) Adrián Menéndez Maceiras	(Slovakia) Andrej Martin (Bosnia and Herzegovina) Mirza Bašić	(Canada) Brayden Schnur (Russia) Pavel Kotov (Italy) Riccardo Bonadio (Italy) Gian Marco Moroni
June 14	Internazionali di Tennis Città di Forlì; Forlì, Italy; Challenger 80 – Clay – 32S/16Q/16D; Singles – Doubles	(Germany) Mats Moraing; 3–6, 6–1, 7–5	(France) Quentin Halys	(Portugal) Gastão Elias (Argentina) Tomás Martín Etcheverry	(Italy) Francesco Forti (Italy) Raúl Brancaccio (Canada) Steven Diez (Italy) Jacopo Berrettini
June 14	Internazionali di Tennis Città di Forlì; Forlì, Italy; Challenger 80 – Clay – 32S/16Q/16D; Singles – Doubles	(Peru) Sergio Galdós (Brazil) Orlando Luz; 7–5, 2–6, [10–8]	(Argentina) Pedro Cachin (Argentina) Camilo Ugo Carabelli	(Portugal) Gastão Elias (Argentina) Tomás Martín Etcheverry	(Italy) Francesco Forti (Italy) Raúl Brancaccio (Canada) Steven Diez (Italy) Jacopo Berrettini
June 21	Aspria Tennis Cup; Milan, Italy; Challenger 80 – Clay – 32S/16Q/16D; Singles – Doubles	(Italy) Gian Marco Moroni; 6–3, 6–2	(Argentina) Federico Coria	(France) Hugo Grenier (Denmark) Holger Rune	(Portugal) Gastão Elias (Serbia) Peđa Krstin (Croatia) Duje Ajduković (Argentina) Pedro Cachin
June 21	Aspria Tennis Cup; Milan, Italy; Challenger 80 – Clay – 32S/16Q/16D; Singles – Doubles	(Czech Republic) Vít Kopřiva (Czech Republic) Jiří Lehečka; 6–4, 6–0	(Germany) Dustin Brown (Austria) Tristan-Samuel Weissborn	(France) Hugo Grenier (Denmark) Holger Rune	(Portugal) Gastão Elias (Serbia) Peđa Krstin (Croatia) Duje Ajduković (Argentina) Pedro Cachin
June 28	Porto Challenger; Porto, Portugal; Challenger 80 – Hard – 32S/16Q/16D; Singles – Doubles	(Turkey) Altuğ Çelikbilek; 6–2, 6–1	(France) Quentin Halys	(Ukraine) Sergiy Stakhovsky (Ecuador) Emilio Gómez	(Japan) Tatsuma Ito (Portugal) Gonçalo Oliveira (Portugal) Gastão Elias (Canada) Steven Diez
June 28	Porto Challenger; Porto, Portugal; Challenger 80 – Hard – 32S/16Q/16D; Singles – Doubles	(Argentina) Guido Andreozzi (Argentina) Guillermo Durán; 6–7^{(5–7)}, 7–6^{(7–5)}, [11–9]	(Argentina) Renzo Olivo (Mexico) Miguel Ángel Reyes-Varela	(Ukraine) Sergiy Stakhovsky (Ecuador) Emilio Gómez	(Japan) Tatsuma Ito (Portugal) Gonçalo Oliveira (Portugal) Gastão Elias (Canada) Steven Diez

=== July ===
Week of	Tournament	Champions	Runners-up	Semifinalists	Quarterfinalists
July 5	ATP Salzburg Open; Salzburg, Austria; Challenger 125 – Clay – 32S/16Q/16D; Singles – Doubles	(Argentina) Facundo Bagnis; 6–4, 3–6, 6–2	(Argentina) Federico Coria	(Chile) Nicolás Jarry (Argentina) Juan Ignacio Londero	(Czech Republic) Jiří Lehečka (Bosnia and Herzegovina) Damir Džumhur (Slovenia) Blaž Rola (Uruguay) Pablo Cuevas
July 5	ATP Salzburg Open; Salzburg, Austria; Challenger 125 – Clay – 32S/16Q/16D; Singles – Doubles	(Argentina) Facundo Bagnis (Peru) Sergio Galdós; 6–0, 6–3	(United States) Robert Galloway (United States) Alex Lawson	(Chile) Nicolás Jarry (Argentina) Juan Ignacio Londero	(Czech Republic) Jiří Lehečka (Bosnia and Herzegovina) Damir Džumhur (Slovenia) Blaž Rola (Uruguay) Pablo Cuevas
July 5	Sparkassen Open; Braunschweig, Germany; Challenger 90 – Clay – 32S/16Q/16D; Singles – Doubles	(Germany) Daniel Altmaier; 6–1, 6–2	(Switzerland) Henri Laaksonen	(Czech Republic) Vít Kopřiva (Germany) Marvin Möller	(Belgium) Zizou Bergs (Slovakia) Jozef Kovalík (Sweden) Elias Ymer (Germany) Benjamin Hassan
July 5	Sparkassen Open; Braunschweig, Germany; Challenger 90 – Clay – 32S/16Q/16D; Singles – Doubles	(Poland) Szymon Walków (Poland) Jan Zieliński; 6–4, 4–6, [10–4]	(Croatia) Ivan Sabanov (Croatia) Matej Sabanov	(Czech Republic) Vít Kopřiva (Germany) Marvin Möller	(Belgium) Zizou Bergs (Slovakia) Jozef Kovalík (Sweden) Elias Ymer (Germany) Benjamin Hassan
July 5	Internazionali di Tennis Città di Perugia; Perugia, Italy; Challenger 80 – Clay – 32S/16Q/16D; Singles – Doubles	(Argentina) Tomás Martín Etcheverry; 7–5, 6–2	(Ukraine) Vitaliy Sachko	(Italy) Salvatore Caruso (Croatia) Nino Serdarušić	(Italy) Flavio Cobolli (Bosnia and Herzegovina) Nerman Fatić (Kazakhstan) Timofey Skatov (Denmark) Holger Rune
July 5	Internazionali di Tennis Città di Perugia; Perugia, Italy; Challenger 80 – Clay – 32S/16Q/16D; Singles – Doubles	(Ukraine) Vitaliy Sachko (Switzerland) Dominic Stricker; 6–3, 5–7, [10–8]	(Argentina) Tomás Martín Etcheverry (Argentina) Renzo Olivo	(Italy) Salvatore Caruso (Croatia) Nino Serdarušić	(Italy) Flavio Cobolli (Bosnia and Herzegovina) Nerman Fatić (Kazakhstan) Timofey Skatov (Denmark) Holger Rune
July 12	Iași Open; Iași, Romania; Challenger 100 – Clay – 32S/16Q/16D; Singles – Doubles	(Czech Republic) Zdeněk Kolář; 7–5, 4–6, 6–4	(France) Hugo Gaston	(Brazil) Felipe Meligeni Alves (Serbia) Miljan Zekić	(Croatia) Duje Ajduković (Bulgaria) Dimitar Kuzmanov (Austria) Lucas Miedler (Italy) Riccardo Bonadio
July 12	Iași Open; Iași, Romania; Challenger 100 – Clay – 32S/16Q/16D; Singles – Doubles	(Brazil) Orlando Luz (Brazil) Felipe Meligeni Alves; 6–3, 6–4	(Argentina) Hernán Casanova (Spain) Roberto Ortega Olmedo	(Brazil) Felipe Meligeni Alves (Serbia) Miljan Zekić	(Croatia) Duje Ajduković (Bulgaria) Dimitar Kuzmanov (Austria) Lucas Miedler (Italy) Riccardo Bonadio
July 12	Dutch Open; Amersfoort, Netherlands; Challenger 80 – Clay – 32S/16Q/16D; Singles – Doubles	(Netherlands) Tallon Griekspoor; 6–1, 3–6, 6–1	(Netherlands) Botic van de Zandschulp	(France) Antoine Hoang (Argentina) Guido Andreozzi	(Belgium) Kimmer Coppejans (Czech Republic) Lukáš Rosol (Netherlands) Jelle Sels (Netherlands) Jesper de Jong
July 12	Dutch Open; Amersfoort, Netherlands; Challenger 80 – Clay – 32S/16Q/16D; Singles – Doubles	(Switzerland) Luca Castelnuovo (France) Manuel Guinard; 0–6, 6–4, [11–9]	(Peru) Sergio Galdós (Portugal) Gonçalo Oliveira	(France) Antoine Hoang (Argentina) Guido Andreozzi	(Belgium) Kimmer Coppejans (Czech Republic) Lukáš Rosol (Netherlands) Jelle Sels (Netherlands) Jesper de Jong
July 12	President's Cup; Nur-Sultan, Kazakhstan; Challenger 80 – Hard – 32S/16Q/16D; Singles – Doubles	(Australia) Max Purcell; 3–6, 6–4, 7–6^{(8–6)}	(United Kingdom) Jay Clarke	(Canada) Peter Polansky (Croatia) Borna Gojo	(Russia) Roman Safiullin (Chinese Taipei) Hsu Yu-hsiou (Australia) Jason Kubler (Bosnia and Herzegovina) Mirza Bašić
July 12	President's Cup; Nur-Sultan, Kazakhstan; Challenger 80 – Hard – 32S/16Q/16D; Singles – Doubles	(Chinese Taipei) Hsu Yu-hsiou (Zimbabwe) Benjamin Lock; 2–6, 6–1, [10–7]	(Canada) Peter Polansky (Ukraine) Sergiy Stakhovsky	(Canada) Peter Polansky (Croatia) Borna Gojo	(Russia) Roman Safiullin (Chinese Taipei) Hsu Yu-hsiou (Australia) Jason Kubler (Bosnia and Herzegovina) Mirza Bašić
July 12	Internazionali di Tennis Città di Todi; Todi, Italy; Challenger 80 – Clay – 32S/16Q/16D; Singles – Doubles	(Spain) Mario Vilella Martínez; 7–6^{(7–3)}, 1–6, 6–3	(Italy) Federico Gaio	(Argentina) Tomás Martín Etcheverry (Brazil) Matheus Pucinelli de Almeida	(Italy) Flavio Cobolli (United States) Alexander Ritschard (Chile) Nicolás Jarry (Italy) Giulio Zeppieri
July 12	Internazionali di Tennis Città di Todi; Todi, Italy; Challenger 80 – Clay – 32S/16Q/16D; Singles – Doubles	(Italy) Francesco Forti (Italy) Giulio Zeppieri; 6–3, 6–2	(Argentina) Facundo Díaz Acosta (Peru) Alexander Merino	(Argentina) Tomás Martín Etcheverry (Brazil) Matheus Pucinelli de Almeida	(Italy) Flavio Cobolli (United States) Alexander Ritschard (Chile) Nicolás Jarry (Italy) Giulio Zeppieri
July 19	Cary Challenger; Cary, United States; Challenger 80 – Hard – 32S/16Q/16D; Singles – Doubles	(United States) Mitchell Krueger; 7–6^{(7–4)}, 6–2	(India) Ramkumar Ramanathan	(United States) Govind Nanda (United States) Stefan Kozlov	(Argentina) Genaro Alberto Olivieri (United States) Christian Harrison (United States) Christopher Eubanks (India) Prajnesh Gunneswaran
July 19	Cary Challenger; Cary, United States; Challenger 80 – Hard – 32S/16Q/16D; Singles – Doubles	(United States) Christian Harrison (United States) Dennis Novikov; 6–3, 6–3	(Cyprus) Petros Chrysochos (Greece) Michail Pervolarakis	(United States) Govind Nanda (United States) Stefan Kozlov	(Argentina) Genaro Alberto Olivieri (United States) Christian Harrison (United States) Christopher Eubanks (India) Prajnesh Gunneswaran
July 19	President's Cup II; Nur-Sultan, Kazakhstan; Challenger 80 – Hard – 32S/16Q/16D; Singles – Doubles	(Russia) Andrey Kuznetsov; 6–3, 2–1 ret.	(Australia) Jason Kubler	(Russia) Pavel Kotov (Ukraine) Oleksii Krutykh	(United Kingdom) Ryan Peniston (Canada) Peter Polansky (France) Hugo Grenier (United States) Nick Chappell
July 19	President's Cup II; Nur-Sultan, Kazakhstan; Challenger 80 – Hard – 32S/16Q/16D; Singles – Doubles	(Chinese Taipei) Hsu Yu-hsiou (Zimbabwe) Benjamin Lock; 6–3, 6–4	(Ukraine) Oleksii Krutykh (Kazakhstan) Grigoriy Lomakin	(Russia) Pavel Kotov (Ukraine) Oleksii Krutykh	(United Kingdom) Ryan Peniston (Canada) Peter Polansky (France) Hugo Grenier (United States) Nick Chappell
July 19	Open de Tenis Ciudad de Pozoblanco; Pozoblanco, Spain; Challenger 80 – Hard – 32S/16Q/16D; Singles – Doubles	(Turkey) Altuğ Çelikbilek; 6–1, 6–7^{(2–7)}, 6–3	(Turkey) Cem İlkel	(Belgium) Michael Geerts (France) Grégoire Barrère	(United States) Emilio Nava (Netherlands) Tim van Rijthoven (Spain) Adrián Menéndez Maceiras (Bolivia) Federico Zeballos
July 19	Open de Tenis Ciudad de Pozoblanco; Pozoblanco, Spain; Challenger 80 – Hard – 32S/16Q/16D; Singles – Doubles	(Netherlands) Igor Sijsling (Netherlands) Tim van Rijthoven; 5–7, 7–6^{(7–4)}, [10–5]	(Ecuador) Diego Hidalgo (Spain) Sergio Martos Gornés	(Belgium) Michael Geerts (France) Grégoire Barrère	(United States) Emilio Nava (Netherlands) Tim van Rijthoven (Spain) Adrián Menéndez Maceiras (Bolivia) Federico Zeballos
July 19	Tampere Open; Tampere, Finland; Challenger 80 – Clay – 32S/16Q/16D; Singles – Doubles	(Czech Republic) Jiří Lehečka; 5–7, 6–4, 6–3	(Argentina) Nicolás Kicker	(Netherlands) Botic van de Zandschulp (France) Kyrian Jacquet	(Kazakhstan) Dmitry Popko (Spain) Mario Vilella Martínez (Finland) Otto Virtanen (France) Geoffrey Blancaneaux
July 19	Tampere Open; Tampere, Finland; Challenger 80 – Clay – 32S/16Q/16D; Singles – Doubles	(Argentina) Pedro Cachin (Argentina) Facundo Mena; 7–5, 6–3	(Brazil) Orlando Luz (Brazil) Felipe Meligeni Alves	(Netherlands) Botic van de Zandschulp (France) Kyrian Jacquet	(Kazakhstan) Dmitry Popko (Spain) Mario Vilella Martínez (Finland) Otto Virtanen (France) Geoffrey Blancaneaux
July 26	Poznań Open; Poznań, Poland; Challenger 90 – Clay – 32S/16Q/16D; Singles – Doubles	(Spain) Bernabé Zapata Miralles; 6–3, 6–2	(Czech Republic) Jiří Lehečka	(Kazakhstan) Dmitry Popko (Russia) Alexander Shevchenko	(France) Alexandre Müller (Argentina) Nicolás Kicker (Czech Republic) Zdeněk Kolář (Netherlands) Botic van de Zandschulp
July 26	Poznań Open; Poznań, Poland; Challenger 90 – Clay – 32S/16Q/16D; Singles – Doubles	(Czech Republic) Zdeněk Kolář (Czech Republic) Jiří Lehečka; 6–4, 3–6, [10–5]	(Poland) Karol Drzewiecki (Australia) Aleksandar Vukic	(Kazakhstan) Dmitry Popko (Russia) Alexander Shevchenko	(France) Alexandre Müller (Argentina) Nicolás Kicker (Czech Republic) Zdeněk Kolář (Netherlands) Botic van de Zandschulp
July 26	Open Castilla y León; Segovia, Spain; Challenger 90 – Hard – 32S/16Q/16D; Singles – Doubles	(France) Benjamin Bonzi; 7–6^{(12–10)}, 3–6, 6–4	(Netherlands) Tim van Rijthoven	(France) Hugo Grenier (United States) Nicolas Moreno de Alboran	(Spain) Feliciano López (France) Mathias Bourgue (Turkey) Altuğ Çelikbilek (Czech Republic) Dalibor Svrčina
July 26	Open Castilla y León; Segovia, Spain; Challenger 90 – Hard – 32S/16Q/16D; Singles – Doubles	(United States) Robert Galloway (United States) Alex Lawson; 7–6^{(10–8)}, 6–4	(United States) JC Aragone (Colombia) Nicolás Barrientos	(France) Hugo Grenier (United States) Nicolas Moreno de Alboran	(Spain) Feliciano López (France) Mathias Bourgue (Turkey) Altuğ Çelikbilek (Czech Republic) Dalibor Svrčina
July 26	Kentucky Bank Tennis Championships; Lexington, United States; Challenger 80 – Hard – 32S/16Q/16D; Singles – Doubles	(Australia) Jason Kubler; 7–5, 6–7^{(2–7)}, 7–5	(Chile) Alejandro Tabilo	(Australia) Thanasi Kokkinakis (United States) Ernesto Escobedo	(United States) Jenson Brooksby (India) Ramkumar Ramanathan (Barbados) Darian King (Argentina) Genaro Alberto Olivieri
July 26	Kentucky Bank Tennis Championships; Lexington, United States; Challenger 80 – Hard – 32S/16Q/16D; Singles – Doubles	(Canada) Liam Draxl (United States) Stefan Kozlov; 6–2, 6–7^{(5–7)}, [10–7]	(United States) Alex Rybakov (United States) Reese Stalder	(Australia) Thanasi Kokkinakis (United States) Ernesto Escobedo	(United States) Jenson Brooksby (India) Ramkumar Ramanathan (Barbados) Darian King (Argentina) Genaro Alberto Olivieri
July 26	Internazionali di Tennis Città di Trieste; Trieste, Italy; Challenger 80 – Clay – 32S/16Q/16D; Singles – Doubles	(Argentina) Tomás Martín Etcheverry; 6–1, 6–1	(Argentina) Thiago Agustín Tirante	(Bosnia and Herzegovina) Damir Džumhur (Kazakhstan) Timofey Skatov	(Germany) Maximilian Marterer (Brazil) Orlando Luz (Ukraine) Vitaliy Sachko (Italy) Flavio Cobolli
July 26	Internazionali di Tennis Città di Trieste; Trieste, Italy; Challenger 80 – Clay – 32S/16Q/16D; Singles – Doubles	(Brazil) Orlando Luz (Brazil) Felipe Meligeni Alves; 7–5, 6–7^{(6–8)}, [10–5]	(France) Antoine Hoang (France) Albano Olivetti	(Bosnia and Herzegovina) Damir Džumhur (Kazakhstan) Timofey Skatov	(Germany) Maximilian Marterer (Brazil) Orlando Luz (Ukraine) Vitaliy Sachko (Italy) Flavio Cobolli

=== August ===
Week of	Tournament	Champions	Runners-up	Semifinalists	Quarterfinalists
August 2	Internazionali di Tennis del Friuli Venezia Giulia; Cordenons, Italy; Challenger 80 – Clay – 32S/16Q/16D; Singles – Doubles	(Argentina) Francisco Cerúndolo; 6–1, 6–2	(Argentina) Tomás Martín Etcheverry	(Argentina) Andrea Collarini (Switzerland) Marc-Andrea Hüsler	(Italy) Stefano Travaglia (Italy) Giulio Zeppieri (Peru) Juan Pablo Varillas (Chile) Marcelo Tomás Barrios Vera
August 2	Internazionali di Tennis del Friuli Venezia Giulia; Cordenons, Italy; Challenger 80 – Clay – 32S/16Q/16D; Singles – Doubles	(Brazil) Orlando Luz (Brazil) Rafael Matos; 6–4, 7–6^{(7–5)}	(Peru) Sergio Galdós (Argentina) Renzo Olivo	(Argentina) Andrea Collarini (Switzerland) Marc-Andrea Hüsler	(Italy) Stefano Travaglia (Italy) Giulio Zeppieri (Peru) Juan Pablo Varillas (Chile) Marcelo Tomás Barrios Vera
August 2	Svijany Open; Liberec, Czech Republic; Challenger 80 – Clay – 32S/16Q/16D; Singles – Doubles	(Slovakia) Alex Molčan; 6–0, 6–1	(Czech Republic) Tomáš Macháč	(Tunisia) Malek Jaziri (Netherlands) Botic van de Zandschulp	(Australia) Marc Polmans (Poland) Kamil Majchrzak (Austria) Gerald Melzer (United States) Alexander Ritschard
August 2	Svijany Open; Liberec, Czech Republic; Challenger 80 – Clay – 32S/16Q/16D; Singles – Doubles	(Czech Republic) Roman Jebavý (Slovakia) Igor Zelenay; 6–2, 6–7^{(6–8)}, [10–5]	(France) Geoffrey Blancaneaux (France) Maxime Janvier	(Tunisia) Malek Jaziri (Netherlands) Botic van de Zandschulp	(Australia) Marc Polmans (Poland) Kamil Majchrzak (Austria) Gerald Melzer (United States) Alexander Ritschard
August 9	San Marino Open; San Marino, San Marino; Challenger 90 – Clay – 32S/16Q/16D; Singles – Doubles	(Denmark) Holger Rune; 1–6, 6–2, 6–3	(Brazil) Orlando Luz	(Italy) Marco Cecchinato (Bolivia) Hugo Dellien	(Russia) Pavel Kotov (Brazil) João Menezes (Brazil) Felipe Meligeni Alves (France) Maxime Janvier
August 9	San Marino Open; San Marino, San Marino; Challenger 90 – Clay – 32S/16Q/16D; Singles – Doubles	(Czech Republic) Zdeněk Kolář (Venezuela) Luis David Martínez; 1–6, 6–3, [10–3]	(Brazil) Rafael Matos (Brazil) João Menezes	(Italy) Marco Cecchinato (Bolivia) Hugo Dellien	(Russia) Pavel Kotov (Brazil) João Menezes (Brazil) Felipe Meligeni Alves (France) Maxime Janvier
August 9	Meerbusch Challenger; Meerbusch, Germany; Challenger 80 – Clay – 32S/16Q/16D; Singles – Doubles	(Chile) Marcelo Tomás Barrios Vera; 7–6^{(9–7)}, 6–3	(Argentina) Juan Manuel Cerúndolo	(Netherlands) Robin Haase (Netherlands) Botic van de Zandschulp	(Germany) Daniel Altmaier (Germany) Mats Moraing (Slovakia) Lukáš Klein (Slovakia) Filip Horanský
August 9	Meerbusch Challenger; Meerbusch, Germany; Challenger 80 – Clay – 32S/16Q/16D; Singles – Doubles	(Poland) Szymon Walków (Poland) Jan Zieliński; 6–3, 6–1	(Germany) Dustin Brown (Netherlands) Robin Haase	(Netherlands) Robin Haase (Netherlands) Botic van de Zandschulp	(Germany) Daniel Altmaier (Germany) Mats Moraing (Slovakia) Lukáš Klein (Slovakia) Filip Horanský
August 9	ATP Prague Open; Prague, Czech Republic; Challenger 50 – Clay – 32S/16Q/16D; Singles – Doubles	(Czech Republic) Dalibor Svrčina; 6–0, 7–5	(Kazakhstan) Dmitry Popko	(Czech Republic) Jonáš Forejtek (Argentina) Facundo Mena	(Serbia) Nikola Milojević (France) Evan Furness (Argentina) Camilo Ugo Carabelli (Italy) Riccardo Bonadio
August 9	ATP Prague Open; Prague, Czech Republic; Challenger 50 – Clay – 32S/16Q/16D; Singles – Doubles	(Czech Republic) Jonáš Forejtek (Czech Republic) Michael Vrbenský; 6–1, 6–4	(Russia) Evgeny Karlovskiy (Russia) Evgenii Tiurnev	(Czech Republic) Jonáš Forejtek (Argentina) Facundo Mena	(Serbia) Nikola Milojević (France) Evan Furness (Argentina) Camilo Ugo Carabelli (Italy) Riccardo Bonadio
August 16	Platzmann-Sauerland Open; Lüdenscheid, Germany; Challenger 80 – Clay – 32S/16Q/16D; Singles – Doubles	(Germany) Daniel Altmaier; 7–6^{(7–1)}, 4–6, 6–3	(Chile) Nicolás Jarry	(Germany) Julian Lenz (Argentina) Juan Manuel Cerúndolo	(Bosnia and Herzegovina) Mirza Bašić (Croatia) Duje Ajduković (Spain) Javier Barranco Cosano (Argentina) Camilo Ugo Carabelli
August 16	Platzmann-Sauerland Open; Lüdenscheid, Germany; Challenger 80 – Clay – 32S/16Q/16D; Singles – Doubles	(Croatia) Ivan Sabanov (Croatia) Matej Sabanov; 6–4, 2–6, [12–10]	(Ukraine) Denys Molchanov (Kazakhstan) Aleksandr Nedovyesov	(Germany) Julian Lenz (Argentina) Juan Manuel Cerúndolo	(Bosnia and Herzegovina) Mirza Bašić (Croatia) Duje Ajduković (Spain) Javier Barranco Cosano (Argentina) Camilo Ugo Carabelli
August 16	Internazionali di Tennis Città di Verona; Verona, Italy; Challenger 80 – Clay – 32S/16Q/16D; Singles – Doubles	(Denmark) Holger Rune; 6–4, 6–2	(Croatia) Nino Serdarušić	(Spain) Carlos Taberner (United Kingdom) Jay Clarke	(France) Maxime Janvier (Italy) Riccardo Bonadio (Portugal) Gastão Elias (Kazakhstan) Dmitry Popko
August 16	Internazionali di Tennis Città di Verona; Verona, Italy; Challenger 80 – Clay – 32S/16Q/16D; Singles – Doubles	(France) Sadio Doumbia (France) Fabien Reboul; 7–5, 4–6, [10–6]	(Switzerland) Luca Margaroli (Portugal) Gonçalo Oliveira	(Spain) Carlos Taberner (United Kingdom) Jay Clarke	(France) Maxime Janvier (Italy) Riccardo Bonadio (Portugal) Gastão Elias (Kazakhstan) Dmitry Popko
August 23	Open Città della Disfida; Barletta, Italy; Challenger 80 – Clay – 32S/16Q/16D; Singles – Doubles	(Italy) Giulio Zeppieri; 6–1, 3–6, 6–3	(Italy) Flavio Cobolli	(Argentina) Thiago Agustín Tirante (Chinese Taipei) Tseng Chun-hsin	(Peru) Nicolás Álvarez (Tunisia) Aziz Dougaz (Italy) Andrea Vavassori (Italy) Julian Ocleppo
August 23	Open Città della Disfida; Barletta, Italy; Challenger 80 – Clay – 32S/16Q/16D; Singles – Doubles	(Italy) Marco Bortolotti (Colombia) Cristian Rodríguez; 6–2, 6–4	(Netherlands) Gijs Brouwer (Netherlands) Jelle Sels	(Argentina) Thiago Agustín Tirante (Chinese Taipei) Tseng Chun-hsin	(Peru) Nicolás Álvarez (Tunisia) Aziz Dougaz (Italy) Andrea Vavassori (Italy) Julian Ocleppo
August 23	BNP Paribas Polish Cup; Warsaw, Poland; Challenger 80 – Clay – 32S/16Q/16D; Singles – Doubles	(Argentina) Camilo Ugo Carabelli; 6–4, 6–2	(Croatia) Nino Serdarušić	(Spain) Javier Barranco Cosano (Slovakia) Jozef Kovalík	(Chile) Nicolás Jarry (Slovakia) Lukáš Klein (Czech Republic) Michael Vrbenský (Austria) Lucas Miedler
August 23	BNP Paribas Polish Cup; Warsaw, Poland; Challenger 80 – Clay – 32S/16Q/16D; Singles – Doubles	(Mexico) Hans Hach Verdugo (Mexico) Miguel Ángel Reyes-Varela; 6–4, 6–4	(Ukraine) Vladyslav Manafov (Poland) Piotr Matuszewski	(Spain) Javier Barranco Cosano (Slovakia) Jozef Kovalík	(Chile) Nicolás Jarry (Slovakia) Lukáš Klein (Czech Republic) Michael Vrbenský (Austria) Lucas Miedler
August 23	ATP Prague Open II; Prague, Czech Republic; Challenger 50 – Clay – 32S/16Q/16D; Singles – Doubles	(Italy) Franco Agamenone; 6–3, 6–1	(United Kingdom) Ryan Peniston	(Argentina) Genaro Alberto Olivieri (Netherlands) Igor Sijsling	(Russia) Evgeny Karlovskiy (Argentina) Facundo Díaz Acosta (Belgium) Michael Geerts (Japan) Kaichi Uchida
August 23	ATP Prague Open II; Prague, Czech Republic; Challenger 50 – Clay – 32S/16Q/16D; Singles – Doubles	(Romania) Victor Vlad Cornea (Greece) Petros Tsitsipas; 6–3, 3–6, [10–8]	(Czech Republic) Martin Krumich (Czech Republic) Andrew Paulson	(Argentina) Genaro Alberto Olivieri (Netherlands) Igor Sijsling	(Russia) Evgeny Karlovskiy (Argentina) Facundo Díaz Acosta (Belgium) Michael Geerts (Japan) Kaichi Uchida
August 30	Città di Como Challenger; Como, Italy; Challenger 80 – Clay – 32S/16Q/16D; Singles – Doubles	(Argentina) Juan Manuel Cerúndolo; 7–5, 7–6^{(9–7)}	(Italy) Gian Marco Moroni	(Germany) Daniel Altmaier (Italy) Andrea Vavassori	(Italy) Riccardo Bonadio (Croatia) Nino Serdarušić (Italy) Andrea Arnaboldi (Slovakia) Jozef Kovalík
August 30	Città di Como Challenger; Como, Italy; Challenger 80 – Clay – 32S/16Q/16D; Singles – Doubles	(Brazil) Rafael Matos (Brazil) Felipe Meligeni Alves; 6–7^{(2–7)}, 6–4, [10–6]	(Venezuela) Luis David Martínez (Italy) Andrea Vavassori	(Germany) Daniel Altmaier (Italy) Andrea Vavassori	(Italy) Riccardo Bonadio (Croatia) Nino Serdarušić (Italy) Andrea Arnaboldi (Slovakia) Jozef Kovalík
August 30	Rafa Nadal Open; Mallorca, Spain; Challenger 80 – Hard – 32S/16Q/16D; Singles – Doubles	(Slovakia) Lukáš Lacko; 5–7, 7–6^{(10–8)}, 6–1	(Japan) Yasutaka Uchiyama	(Belgium) Michael Geerts (Germany) Tobias Kamke	(India) Ramkumar Ramanathan (Portugal) João Sousa (Portugal) Frederico Ferreira Silva (Spain) Fernando Verdasco
August 30	Rafa Nadal Open; Mallorca, Spain; Challenger 80 – Hard – 32S/16Q/16D; Singles – Doubles	(Poland) Karol Drzewiecki (Spain) Sergio Martos Gornés; 6–4, 4–6, [10–3]	(Brazil) Fernando Romboli (Poland) Jan Zieliński	(Belgium) Michael Geerts (Germany) Tobias Kamke	(India) Ramkumar Ramanathan (Portugal) João Sousa (Portugal) Frederico Ferreira Silva (Spain) Fernando Verdasco
August 30	Saint-Tropez Open; Saint-Tropez, France; Challenger 80 – Hard – 32S/16Q/16D; Singles – Doubles	(France) Benjamin Bonzi; 6–7^{(10–12)}, 6–1, 0–0 ret.	(Australia) Christopher O'Connell	(France) Hugo Grenier (Australia) Thanasi Kokkinakis	(France) Enzo Couacaud (France) Constant Lestienne (France) Grégoire Barrère (France) Alexandre Müller
August 30	Saint-Tropez Open; Saint-Tropez, France; Challenger 80 – Hard – 32S/16Q/16D; Singles – Doubles	(Croatia) Antonio Šančić (New Zealand) Artem Sitak; 7–6^{(7–5)}, 6–4	(Monaco) Romain Arneodo (France) Manuel Guinard	(France) Hugo Grenier (Australia) Thanasi Kokkinakis	(France) Enzo Couacaud (France) Constant Lestienne (France) Grégoire Barrère (France) Alexandre Müller

=== September ===
Week of	Tournament	Champions	Runners-up	Semifinalists	Quarterfinalists
September 6	NÖ Open; Tulln an der Donau, Austria; Challenger 100 – Clay – 32S/16Q/16D; Singles – Doubles	(Germany) Mats Moraing; 6–2, 6–1	(France) Hugo Gaston	(Poland) Kamil Majchrzak (Czech Republic) Jiří Veselý	(Austria) Filip Misolic (Switzerland) Marc-Andrea Hüsler (Brazil) Thiago Monteiro (Austria) Dennis Novak
September 6	NÖ Open; Tulln an der Donau, Austria; Challenger 100 – Clay – 32S/16Q/16D; Singles – Doubles	(Germany) Dustin Brown (Italy) Andrea Vavassori; 7–6^{(7–5)}, 6–1	(Brazil) Rafael Matos (Brazil) Felipe Meligeni Alves	(Poland) Kamil Majchrzak (Czech Republic) Jiří Veselý	(Austria) Filip Misolic (Switzerland) Marc-Andrea Hüsler (Brazil) Thiago Monteiro (Austria) Dennis Novak
September 6	Copa Sevilla; Seville, Spain; Challenger 90 – Clay – 32S/16Q/16D; Singles – Doubles	(Spain) Pedro Martínez; 6–4, 6–1	(Spain) Roberto Carballés Baena	(Chile) Marcelo Tomás Barrios Vera (Spain) Carlos Taberner	(Spain) Pablo Andújar (Italy) Luciano Darderi (Italy) Gian Marco Moroni (Italy) Flavio Cobolli
September 6	Copa Sevilla; Seville, Spain; Challenger 90 – Clay – 32S/16Q/16D; Singles – Doubles	(Spain) David Vega Hernández (Netherlands) Mark Vervoort; 6–3, 6–7^{(7–9)}, [10–7]	(Spain) Javier Barranco Cosano (Spain) Sergio Martos Gornés	(Chile) Marcelo Tomás Barrios Vera (Spain) Carlos Taberner	(Spain) Pablo Andújar (Italy) Luciano Darderi (Italy) Gian Marco Moroni (Italy) Flavio Cobolli
September 6	Banja Luka Challenger; Banja Luka, Bosnia and Herzegovina; Challenger 80 – Clay – 32S/16Q/16D; Singles – Doubles	(Argentina) Juan Manuel Cerúndolo; 6–3, 6–1	(Serbia) Nikola Milojević	(Slovakia) Andrej Martin (Argentina) Tomás Martín Etcheverry	(Spain) Carlos Gómez-Herrera (Czech Republic) Zdeněk Kolář (Serbia) Marko Topo (Chinese Taipei) Tseng Chun-hsin
September 6	Banja Luka Challenger; Banja Luka, Bosnia and Herzegovina; Challenger 80 – Clay – 32S/16Q/16D; Singles – Doubles	(Croatia) Antonio Šančić (Croatia) Nino Serdarušić; 6–3, 6–3	(Croatia) Ivan Sabanov (Croatia) Matej Sabanov	(Slovakia) Andrej Martin (Argentina) Tomás Martín Etcheverry	(Spain) Carlos Gómez-Herrera (Czech Republic) Zdeněk Kolář (Serbia) Marko Topo (Chinese Taipei) Tseng Chun-hsin
September 6	Cassis Open Provence; Cassis, France; Challenger 80 – Hard – 32S/16Q/16D; Singles – Doubles	(France) Benjamin Bonzi; 7–6^{(7–4)}, 6–4	(France) Lucas Pouille	(Poland) Kacper Żuk (United Kingdom) Liam Broady	(France) Luca Van Assche (Australia) Thanasi Kokkinakis (India) Ramkumar Ramanathan (France) Clément Chidekh
September 6	Cassis Open Provence; Cassis, France; Challenger 80 – Hard – 32S/16Q/16D; Singles – Doubles	(India) Sriram Balaji (India) Ramkumar Ramanathan; 6–4, 3–6, [10–6]	(Mexico) Hans Hach Verdugo (Mexico) Miguel Ángel Reyes-Varela	(Poland) Kacper Żuk (United Kingdom) Liam Broady	(France) Luca Van Assche (Australia) Thanasi Kokkinakis (India) Ramkumar Ramanathan (France) Clément Chidekh
September 6	Kyiv Open; Kyiv, Ukraine; Challenger 80 – Clay – 32S/16Q/16D; Singles – Doubles	(Italy) Franco Agamenone; 7–5, 6–2	(Argentina) Sebastián Báez	(Turkey) Ergi Kırkın (Kazakhstan) Timofey Skatov	(Romania) Filip Jianu (Kazakhstan) Dmitry Popko (Portugal) Nuno Borges (Ukraine) Oleksii Krutykh
September 6	Kyiv Open; Kyiv, Ukraine; Challenger 80 – Clay – 32S/16Q/16D; Singles – Doubles	(Brazil) Orlando Luz (Kazakhstan) Aleksandr Nedovyesov; 6–4, 6–4	(Ukraine) Denys Molchanov (Ukraine) Sergiy Stakhovsky	(Turkey) Ergi Kırkın (Kazakhstan) Timofey Skatov	(Romania) Filip Jianu (Kazakhstan) Dmitry Popko (Portugal) Nuno Borges (Ukraine) Oleksii Krutykh
September 13	Pekao Szczecin Open; Szczecin, Poland; Challenger 125 – Clay – 32S/16Q/16D; Singles – Doubles	(Czech Republic) Zdeněk Kolář; 7–6^{(7–4)}, 7–5	(Poland) Kamil Majchrzak	(Spain) Nicola Kuhn (Germany) Yannick Hanfmann	(Argentina) Marco Trungelliti (Netherlands) Jesper de Jong (Poland) Paweł Ciaś (Denmark) Holger Rune
September 13	Pekao Szczecin Open; Szczecin, Poland; Challenger 125 – Clay – 32S/16Q/16D; Singles – Doubles	(Mexico) Santiago González (Argentina) Andrés Molteni; 2–6, 6–2, [15–13]	(Sweden) André Göransson (United States) Nathaniel Lammons	(Spain) Nicola Kuhn (Germany) Yannick Hanfmann	(Argentina) Marco Trungelliti (Netherlands) Jesper de Jong (Poland) Paweł Ciaś (Denmark) Holger Rune
September 13	Open de Rennes; Rennes, France; Challenger 90 – Hard (i) – 32S/16Q/16D; Singles – Doubles	(France) Benjamin Bonzi; 7–6^{(7–3)}, 7–6^{(7–3)}	(Germany) Mats Moraing	(France) Richard Gasquet (France) Arthur Rinderknech	(Russia) Roman Safiullin (Russia) Teymuraz Gabashvili (United Kingdom) Liam Broady (France) Lucas Pouille
September 13	Open de Rennes; Rennes, France; Challenger 90 – Hard (i) – 32S/16Q/16D; Singles – Doubles	(Netherlands) Bart Stevens (Netherlands) Tim van Rijthoven; 6–7^{(2–7)}, 7–5, [10–3]	(Czech Republic) Marek Gengel (Czech Republic) Tomáš Macháč	(France) Richard Gasquet (France) Arthur Rinderknech	(Russia) Roman Safiullin (Russia) Teymuraz Gabashvili (United Kingdom) Liam Broady (France) Lucas Pouille
September 13	Cary Challenger II; Cary, United States; Challenger 80 – Hard – 32S/16Q/16D; Singles – Doubles	(United States) Mitchell Krueger; 6–4, 6–3	(United States) Bjorn Fratangelo	(Australia) Aleksandar Vukic (United States) Denis Kudla	(United Kingdom) Ryan Peniston (United States) Zachary Svajda (Australia) Max Purcell (United States) Michael Mmoh
September 13	Cary Challenger II; Cary, United States; Challenger 80 – Hard – 32S/16Q/16D; Singles – Doubles	(United States) William Blumberg (United States) Max Schnur; 6–4, 1–6, [10–4]	(United States) Stefan Kozlov (Canada) Peter Polansky	(Australia) Aleksandar Vukic (United States) Denis Kudla	(United Kingdom) Ryan Peniston (United States) Zachary Svajda (Australia) Max Purcell (United States) Michael Mmoh
September 13	Amex-Istanbul Challenger II; Istanbul, Turkey; Challenger 80 – Hard – 32S/16Q/16D; Singles – Doubles	(Australia) James Duckworth; 6–4, 6–2	(Chinese Taipei) Wu Tung-lin	(France) Quentin Halys (Croatia) Borna Gojo	(France) Hugo Grenier (Japan) Yasutaka Uchiyama (France) Geoffrey Blancaneaux (Bosnia and Herzegovina) Aldin Šetkić
September 13	Amex-Istanbul Challenger II; Istanbul, Turkey; Challenger 80 – Hard – 32S/16Q/16D; Singles – Doubles	(Moldova) Radu Albot (Moldova) Alexander Cozbinov; 4–6, 7–5, [11–9]	(Croatia) Antonio Šančić (New Zealand) Artem Sitak	(France) Quentin Halys (Croatia) Borna Gojo	(France) Hugo Grenier (Japan) Yasutaka Uchiyama (France) Geoffrey Blancaneaux (Bosnia and Herzegovina) Aldin Šetkić
September 13	Quito Challenger; Quito, Ecuador; Challenger 80 – Clay – 32S/16Q/16D; Singles – Doubles	(Argentina) Facundo Mena; 6–4, 6–4	(Chile) Gonzalo Lama	(Spain) Pol Martín Tiffon (France) Alexis Gautier	(Argentina) Juan Pablo Ficovich (Argentina) Thiago Agustín Tirante (Argentina) Genaro Alberto Olivieri (France) Matthieu Perchicot
September 13	Quito Challenger; Quito, Ecuador; Challenger 80 – Clay – 32S/16Q/16D; Singles – Doubles	(Colombia) Alejandro Gómez (Argentina) Thiago Agustín Tirante; 7–5, 6–7^{(5–7)}, [10–8]	(Spain) Adrián Menéndez Maceiras (Spain) Mario Vilella Martínez	(Spain) Pol Martín Tiffon (France) Alexis Gautier	(Argentina) Juan Pablo Ficovich (Argentina) Thiago Agustín Tirante (Argentina) Genaro Alberto Olivieri (France) Matthieu Perchicot
September 20	Ambato La Gran Ciudad; Ambato, Ecuador; Challenger 80 – Clay – 32S/16Q/16D; Singles – Doubles	(Argentina) Thiago Agustín Tirante; 7–5, 7–5	(Peru) Juan Pablo Varillas	(Argentina) Juan Pablo Ficovich (Argentina) Facundo Mena	(Argentina) Matías Zukas (Switzerland) Johan Nikles (Austria) Gerald Melzer (France) Alexis Gautier
September 20	Ambato La Gran Ciudad; Ambato, Ecuador; Challenger 80 – Clay – 32S/16Q/16D; Singles – Doubles	(Ecuador) Diego Hidalgo (Colombia) Cristian Rodríguez; 6–3, 4–6, [10–3]	(Colombia) Alejandro Gómez (Argentina) Thiago Agustín Tirante	(Argentina) Juan Pablo Ficovich (Argentina) Facundo Mena	(Argentina) Matías Zukas (Switzerland) Johan Nikles (Austria) Gerald Melzer (France) Alexis Gautier
September 20	Challenger Biel/Bienne; Biel/Bienne, Switzerland; Challenger 80 – Hard (i) – 32S/16Q/16D; Singles – Doubles	(United Kingdom) Liam Broady; 7–5, 6–3	(Switzerland) Marc-Andrea Hüsler	(Netherlands) Tim van Rijthoven (Switzerland) Dominic Stricker	(France) Antoine Escoffier (Portugal) João Sousa (India) Ramkumar Ramanathan (Germany) Tobias Kamke
September 20	Challenger Biel/Bienne; Biel/Bienne, Switzerland; Challenger 80 – Hard (i) – 32S/16Q/16D; Singles – Doubles	(Belgium) Ruben Bemelmans (Germany) Daniel Masur; Walkover	(Switzerland) Marc-Andrea Hüsler (Switzerland) Dominic Stricker	(Netherlands) Tim van Rijthoven (Switzerland) Dominic Stricker	(France) Antoine Escoffier (Portugal) João Sousa (India) Ramkumar Ramanathan (Germany) Tobias Kamke
September 20	Braga Open; Braga, Portugal; Challenger 80 – Clay – 32S/16Q/16D; Singles – Doubles	(Brazil) Thiago Monteiro; 7–5, 7–5	(Serbia) Nikola Milojević	(France) Hugo Gaston (Spain) Nikolás Sánchez Izquierdo	(Italy) Andrea Arnaboldi (Netherlands) Jesper de Jong (Germany) Cedrik-Marcel Stebe (Japan) Taro Daniel
September 20	Braga Open; Braga, Portugal; Challenger 80 – Clay – 32S/16Q/16D; Singles – Doubles	(Portugal) Nuno Borges (Portugal) Francisco Cabral; 6–3, 6–7^{(4–7)}, [10–5]	(Netherlands) Jesper de Jong (Netherlands) Bart Stevens	(France) Hugo Gaston (Spain) Nikolás Sánchez Izquierdo	(Italy) Andrea Arnaboldi (Netherlands) Jesper de Jong (Germany) Cedrik-Marcel Stebe (Japan) Taro Daniel
September 20	Bucharest Challenger; Bucharest, Romania; Challenger 80 – Clay – 32S/16Q/16D; Singles – Doubles	(Czech Republic) Jiří Lehečka; 6–3, 6–2	(Slovakia) Filip Horanský	(Italy) Stefano Travaglia (Italy) Lorenzo Giustino	(Ukraine) Vitaliy Sachko (Romania) David Ionel (Australia) Thanasi Kokkinakis (Italy) Riccardo Bonadio
September 20	Bucharest Challenger; Bucharest, Romania; Challenger 80 – Clay – 32S/16Q/16D; Singles – Doubles	(Philippines) Ruben Gonzales (United States) Hunter Johnson; 1–6, 6–2, [10–3]	(Germany) Maximilian Marterer (Czech Republic) Lukáš Rosol	(Italy) Stefano Travaglia (Italy) Lorenzo Giustino	(Ukraine) Vitaliy Sachko (Romania) David Ionel (Australia) Thanasi Kokkinakis (Italy) Riccardo Bonadio
September 20	Columbus Challenger; Columbus, United States; Challenger 80 – Hard (i) – 32S/16Q/16D; Singles – Doubles	(United States) Stefan Kozlov; 4–6, 6–2, 6–4	(Australia) Max Purcell	(United States) J. J. Wolf (Australia) Aleksandar Vukic	(United States) Tennys Sandgren (Denmark) Mikael Torpegaard (Australia) Alex Bolt (Colombia) Nicolás Mejía
September 20	Columbus Challenger; Columbus, United States; Challenger 80 – Hard (i) – 32S/16Q/16D; Singles – Doubles	(United States) Stefan Kozlov (Canada) Peter Polansky; 7–5, 7–6^{(7–5)}	(United States) Andrew Lutschaunig (Japan) James Trotter	(United States) J. J. Wolf (Australia) Aleksandar Vukic	(United States) Tennys Sandgren (Denmark) Mikael Torpegaard (Australia) Alex Bolt (Colombia) Nicolás Mejía
September 27	Open d'Orléans; Orléans, France; Challenger 125 – Hard (i) – 32S/16Q/16D; Singles – Doubles	(Switzerland) Henri Laaksonen; 6–1, 2–6, 6–2	(Austria) Dennis Novak	(France) Corentin Moutet (Czech Republic) Jiří Veselý	(Belgium) Ruben Bemelmans (France) Hugo Grenier (France) Richard Gasquet (Denmark) Holger Rune
September 27	Open d'Orléans; Orléans, France; Challenger 125 – Hard (i) – 32S/16Q/16D; Singles – Doubles	(France) Pierre-Hugues Herbert (France) Albano Olivetti; 6–2, 2–6, [11–9]	(France) Antoine Hoang (France) Kyrian Jacquet	(France) Corentin Moutet (Czech Republic) Jiří Veselý	(Belgium) Ruben Bemelmans (France) Hugo Grenier (France) Richard Gasquet (Denmark) Holger Rune
September 27	Lisboa Belém Open; Lisbon, Portugal; Challenger 80 – Clay – 32S/16Q/16D; Singles – Doubles	(Kazakhstan) Dmitry Popko; 6–2, 6–4	(Italy) Andrea Pellegrino	(Slovakia) Andrej Martin (France) Hugo Gaston	(Portugal) Frederico Ferreira Silva (Serbia) Nikola Milojević (Germany) Cedrik-Marcel Stebe (Portugal) João Domingues
September 27	Lisboa Belém Open; Lisbon, Portugal; Challenger 80 – Clay – 32S/16Q/16D; Singles – Doubles	(India) Jeevan Nedunchezhiyan (India) Purav Raja; 7–6^{(7–5)}, 6–3	(Portugal) Nuno Borges (Portugal) Francisco Cabral	(Slovakia) Andrej Martin (France) Hugo Gaston	(Portugal) Frederico Ferreira Silva (Serbia) Nikola Milojević (Germany) Cedrik-Marcel Stebe (Portugal) João Domingues
September 27	Lima Challenger; Lima, Peru; Challenger 80 – Clay – 32S/16Q/16D; Singles – Doubles	(Bolivia) Hugo Dellien; 6–3, 7–5	(Argentina) Camilo Ugo Carabelli	(Switzerland) Johan Nikles (Austria) Gerald Melzer	(Argentina) Renzo Olivo (Argentina) Nicolás Kicker (Spain) Eduard Esteve Lobato (Argentina) Juan Manuel Cerúndolo
September 27	Lima Challenger; Lima, Peru; Challenger 80 – Clay – 32S/16Q/16D; Singles – Doubles	(Germany) Julian Lenz (Austria) Gerald Melzer; 7–6^{(7–4)}, 7–6^{(7–3)}	(Colombia) Nicolás Barrientos (Brazil) Fernando Romboli	(Switzerland) Johan Nikles (Austria) Gerald Melzer	(Argentina) Renzo Olivo (Argentina) Nicolás Kicker (Spain) Eduard Esteve Lobato (Argentina) Juan Manuel Cerúndolo
September 27	Murcia Open; Murcia, Spain; Challenger 80 – Clay – 32S/16Q/16D; Singles – Doubles	(Netherlands) Tallon Griekspoor; 3–6, 7–5, 6–3	(Spain) Roberto Carballés Baena	(France) Mathias Bourgue (Italy) Flavio Cobolli	(France) Evan Furness (Argentina) Andrea Collarini (Spain) Nicola Kuhn (Serbia) Miljan Zekić
September 27	Murcia Open; Murcia, Spain; Challenger 80 – Clay – 32S/16Q/16D; Singles – Doubles	(Italy) Raúl Brancaccio (Italy) Flavio Cobolli; 6–3, 7–6^{(7–4)}	(Spain) Alberto Barroso Campos (Spain) Roberto Carballés Baena	(France) Mathias Bourgue (Italy) Flavio Cobolli	(France) Evan Furness (Argentina) Andrea Collarini (Spain) Nicola Kuhn (Serbia) Miljan Zekić
September 27	Sibiu Open; Sibiu, Romania; Challenger 80 – Clay – 32S/16Q/16D; Singles – Doubles	(Italy) Stefano Travaglia; 7–6^{(7–4)}, 6–2	(Australia) Thanasi Kokkinakis	(India) Sumit Nagal (Switzerland) Marc-Andrea Hüsler	(Czech Republic) Zdeněk Kolář (France) Geoffrey Blancaneaux (Slovakia) Alex Molčan (Italy) Franco Agamenone
September 27	Sibiu Open; Sibiu, Romania; Challenger 80 – Clay – 32S/16Q/16D; Singles – Doubles	(Austria) Alexander Erler (Austria) Lucas Miedler; 6–3, 6–1	(United States) James Cerretani (Switzerland) Luca Margaroli	(India) Sumit Nagal (Switzerland) Marc-Andrea Hüsler	(Czech Republic) Zdeněk Kolář (France) Geoffrey Blancaneaux (Slovakia) Alex Molčan (Italy) Franco Agamenone

=== October ===
Week of	Tournament	Champions	Runners-up	Semifinalists	Quarterfinalists
October 4	Internationaux de Tennis de Vendée; Mouilleron-le-Captif, France; Challenger 90 – Hard (i) – 32S/16Q/16D; Singles – Doubles	(Czech Republic) Jiří Veselý; 6–4, 6–4	(Slovakia) Norbert Gombos	(Germany) Mats Rosenkranz (Italy) Andreas Seppi	(France) Pierre-Hugues Herbert (Austria) Dennis Novak (France) Quentin Halys (Germany) Mats Moraing
October 4	Internationaux de Tennis de Vendée; Mouilleron-le-Captif, France; Challenger 90 – Hard (i) – 32S/16Q/16D; Singles – Doubles	(France) Jonathan Eysseric (France) Quentin Halys; 4–6, 7–6^{(7–5)}, [10–8]	(Netherlands) David Pel (Pakistan) Aisam-ul-Haq Qureshi	(Germany) Mats Rosenkranz (Italy) Andreas Seppi	(France) Pierre-Hugues Herbert (Austria) Dennis Novak (France) Quentin Halys (Germany) Mats Moraing
October 4	Sánchez-Casal Cup; Barcelona, Spain; Challenger 80 – Clay – 32S/16Q/16D; Singles – Doubles	(Bulgaria) Dimitar Kuzmanov; 6–3, 6–0	(France) Hugo Gaston	(France) Alexandre Müller (Slovakia) Alex Molčan	(Spain) Nicolás Álvarez Varona (France) Matteo Martineau (Russia) Teymuraz Gabashvili (Spain) Nicola Kuhn
October 4	Sánchez-Casal Cup; Barcelona, Spain; Challenger 80 – Clay – 32S/16Q/16D; Singles – Doubles	(Finland) Harri Heliövaara (Czech Republic) Roman Jebavý; 6–4, 6–3	(Portugal) Nuno Borges (Portugal) Francisco Cabral	(France) Alexandre Müller (Slovakia) Alex Molčan	(Spain) Nicolás Álvarez Varona (France) Matteo Martineau (Russia) Teymuraz Gabashvili (Spain) Nicola Kuhn
October 4	Tennis Napoli Cup; Naples, Italy; Challenger 80 – Clay – 32S/16Q/16D; Singles – Doubles	(Netherlands) Tallon Griekspoor; 6–3, 6–2	(Italy) Andrea Pellegrino	(Italy) Stefano Travaglia (Croatia) Duje Ajduković	(Italy) Andrea Vavassori (Italy) Gian Marco Moroni (Italy) Raúl Brancaccio (Bosnia and Herzegovina) Mirza Bašić
October 4	Tennis Napoli Cup; Naples, Italy; Challenger 80 – Clay – 32S/16Q/16D; Singles – Doubles	(Germany) Dustin Brown (Italy) Andrea Vavassori; 7–5, 7–6^{(7–5)}	(Bosnia and Herzegovina) Mirza Bašić (Croatia) Nino Serdarušić	(Italy) Stefano Travaglia (Croatia) Duje Ajduković	(Italy) Andrea Vavassori (Italy) Gian Marco Moroni (Italy) Raúl Brancaccio (Bosnia and Herzegovina) Mirza Bašić
October 4	Challenger de Santiago II; Santiago, Chile; Challenger 80 – Clay – 32S/16Q/16D; Singles – Doubles	(Peru) Juan Pablo Varillas; 6–4, 7–5	(Argentina) Sebastián Báez	(Chile) Nicolás Jarry (Argentina) Francisco Cerúndolo	(Argentina) Facundo Mena (Bolivia) Hugo Dellien (Austria) Gerald Melzer (Chile) Gonzalo Lama
October 4	Challenger de Santiago II; Santiago, Chile; Challenger 80 – Clay – 32S/16Q/16D; Singles – Doubles	(Ecuador) Diego Hidalgo (Chile) Nicolás Jarry; 6–3, 5–7, [10–6]	(United States) Evan King (United States) Max Schnur	(Chile) Nicolás Jarry (Argentina) Francisco Cerúndolo	(Argentina) Facundo Mena (Bolivia) Hugo Dellien (Austria) Gerald Melzer (Chile) Gonzalo Lama
October 11	JC Ferrero Challenger Open; Alicante, Spain; Challenger 80 – Hard – 32S/16Q/16D; Singles – Doubles	(France) Constant Lestienne; 6–4, 6–3	(France) Hugo Grenier	(Germany) Oscar Otte (Portugal) João Sousa	(Portugal) Nuno Borges (Kazakhstan) Denis Yevseyev (Portugal) Frederico Ferreira Silva (Austria) Lucas Miedler
October 11	JC Ferrero Challenger Open; Alicante, Spain; Challenger 80 – Hard – 32S/16Q/16D; Singles – Doubles	(Ukraine) Denys Molchanov (Spain) David Vega Hernández; 6–4, 6–2	(Monaco) Romain Arneodo (Australia) Matt Reid	(Germany) Oscar Otte (Portugal) João Sousa	(Portugal) Nuno Borges (Kazakhstan) Denis Yevseyev (Portugal) Frederico Ferreira Silva (Austria) Lucas Miedler
October 11	Vesuvio Cup; Ercolano, Italy; Challenger 80 – Clay – 32S/16Q/16D; Singles – Doubles	(Netherlands) Tallon Griekspoor; 6–3, 6–2	(United States) Alexander Ritschard	(Italy) Flavio Cobolli (Italy) Franco Agamenone	(France) Manuel Guinard (Italy) Lorenzo Giustino (Spain) Bernabé Zapata Miralles (Italy) Gian Marco Moroni
October 11	Vesuvio Cup; Ercolano, Italy; Challenger 80 – Clay – 32S/16Q/16D; Singles – Doubles	(Italy) Marco Bortolotti (Spain) Sergio Martos Gornés; 6–4, 3–6, [10–7]	(Germany) Dustin Brown (Italy) Andrea Vavassori	(Italy) Flavio Cobolli (Italy) Franco Agamenone	(France) Manuel Guinard (Italy) Lorenzo Giustino (Spain) Bernabé Zapata Miralles (Italy) Gian Marco Moroni
October 11	Challenger de Santiago III; Santiago, Chile; Challenger 80 – Clay – 32S/16Q/16D; Singles – Doubles	(Argentina) Sebastián Báez; 3–6, 7–6^{(8–6)}, 6–1	(Brazil) Felipe Meligeni Alves	(Chile) Marcelo Tomás Barrios Vera (Brazil) Matheus Pucinelli de Almeida	(Argentina) Juan Manuel Cerúndolo (Peru) Juan Pablo Varillas (Austria) Gerald Melzer (Argentina) Francisco Cerúndolo
October 11	Challenger de Santiago III; Santiago, Chile; Challenger 80 – Clay – 32S/16Q/16D; Singles – Doubles	(United States) Evan King (United States) Max Schnur; 3–6, 7–6^{(7–3)}, [16–14]	(Mexico) Hans Hach Verdugo (Mexico) Miguel Ángel Reyes-Varela	(Chile) Marcelo Tomás Barrios Vera (Brazil) Matheus Pucinelli de Almeida	(Argentina) Juan Manuel Cerúndolo (Peru) Juan Pablo Varillas (Austria) Gerald Melzer (Argentina) Francisco Cerúndolo
October 18	Open Bogotá; Bogotá, Colombia; Challenger 80 – Clay – 32S/16Q/16D; Singles – Doubles	(Austria) Gerald Melzer; 6–2, 3–6, 7–6^{(7–5)}	(Argentina) Facundo Mena	(Colombia) Nicolás Barrientos (Netherlands) Jesper de Jong	(Colombia) Nicolás Mejía (Spain) Oriol Roca Batalla (Brazil) Matheus Pucinelli de Almeida (Canada) Alexis Galarneau
October 18	Open Bogotá; Bogotá, Colombia; Challenger 80 – Clay – 32S/16Q/16D; Singles – Doubles	(Chile) Nicolás Jarry (Ecuador) Roberto Quiroz; 6–7^{(4–7)}, 7–5, [10–4]	(Colombia) Nicolás Barrientos (Colombia) Alejandro Gómez	(Colombia) Nicolás Barrientos (Netherlands) Jesper de Jong	(Colombia) Nicolás Mejía (Spain) Oriol Roca Batalla (Brazil) Matheus Pucinelli de Almeida (Canada) Alexis Galarneau
October 18	Challenger de Buenos Aires; Buenos Aires, Argentina; Challenger 80 – Clay – 32S/16Q/16D; Singles – Doubles	(Argentina) Sebastián Báez; 6–4, 6–0	(Brazil) Thiago Monteiro	(Argentina) Francisco Cerúndolo (Argentina) Juan Manuel Cerúndolo	(Argentina) Tomás Martín Etcheverry (Uruguay) Martín Cuevas (Peru) Juan Pablo Varillas (Bolivia) Hugo Dellien
October 18	Challenger de Buenos Aires; Buenos Aires, Argentina; Challenger 80 – Clay – 32S/16Q/16D; Singles – Doubles	(Italy) Luciano Darderi (Argentina) Juan Bautista Torres; 7–6^{(7–5)}, 7–6^{(12–10)}	(Argentina) Hernán Casanova (Argentina) Santiago Rodríguez Taverna	(Argentina) Francisco Cerúndolo (Argentina) Juan Manuel Cerúndolo	(Argentina) Tomás Martín Etcheverry (Uruguay) Martín Cuevas (Peru) Juan Pablo Varillas (Bolivia) Hugo Dellien
October 18	Lošinj Open; Lošinj, Croatia; Challenger 80 – Clay – 32S/16Q/16D; Singles – Doubles	(Spain) Carlos Taberner; Walkover	(Italy) Marco Cecchinato	(Bosnia and Herzegovina) Nerman Fatić (Italy) Alessandro Giannessi	(France) Mathias Bourgue (Austria) Filip Misolic (Italy) Raúl Brancaccio (Italy) Andrea Arnaboldi
October 18	Lošinj Open; Lošinj, Croatia; Challenger 80 – Clay – 32S/16Q/16D; Singles – Doubles	(Slovakia) Andrej Martin (Austria) Tristan-Samuel Weissborn; 6–1, 7–6^{(7–5)}	(Romania) Victor Vlad Cornea (Turkey) Ergi Kırkın	(Bosnia and Herzegovina) Nerman Fatić (Italy) Alessandro Giannessi	(France) Mathias Bourgue (Austria) Filip Misolic (Italy) Raúl Brancaccio (Italy) Andrea Arnaboldi
October 25	Brest Challenger; Brest, France; Challenger 90 – Hard (i) – 32S/16Q/16D; Singles – Doubles	(United States) Brandon Nakashima; 6–3, 6–3	(Portugal) João Sousa	(France) Alexandre Müller (France) Maxime Janvier	(France) Luca Van Assche (Switzerland) Henri Laaksonen (France) Richard Gasquet (Italy) Federico Gaio
October 25	Brest Challenger; Brest, France; Challenger 90 – Hard (i) – 32S/16Q/16D; Singles – Doubles	(France) Sadio Doumbia (France) Fabien Reboul; 4–6, 6–3, [10–3]	(Italy) Salvatore Caruso (Italy) Federico Gaio	(France) Alexandre Müller (France) Maxime Janvier	(France) Luca Van Assche (Switzerland) Henri Laaksonen (France) Richard Gasquet (Italy) Federico Gaio
October 25	Wolffkran Open; Ismaning, Germany; Challenger 80 – Carpet (i) – 32S/16Q/16D; Singles – Doubles	(Germany) Oscar Otte; 6–4, 6–4	(Slovakia) Lukáš Lacko	(France) Quentin Halys (United States) Maxime Cressy	(Czech Republic) Jonáš Forejtek (Germany) Matthias Bachinger (Poland) Kacper Żuk (Germany) Maximilian Marterer
October 25	Wolffkran Open; Ismaning, Germany; Challenger 80 – Carpet (i) – 32S/16Q/16D; Singles – Doubles	(Germany) Andre Begemann (Slovakia) Igor Zelenay; 6–2, 6–4	(Czech Republic) Marek Gengel (Czech Republic) Tomáš Macháč	(France) Quentin Halys (United States) Maxime Cressy	(Czech Republic) Jonáš Forejtek (Germany) Matthias Bachinger (Poland) Kacper Żuk (Germany) Maximilian Marterer
October 25	Las Vegas Challenger; Las Vegas, United States; Challenger 80 – Hard – 32S/16Q/16D; Singles – Doubles	(United States) J. J. Wolf; 6–4, 6–4	(United States) Stefan Kozlov	(United States) Aleksandar Kovacevic (United States) Michael Mmoh	(Ecuador) Emilio Gómez (Japan) Taro Daniel (Denmark) Mikael Torpegaard (United States) Ernesto Escobedo
October 25	Las Vegas Challenger; Las Vegas, United States; Challenger 80 – Hard – 32S/16Q/16D; Singles – Doubles	(United States) William Blumberg (United States) Max Schnur; 7–5, 6–7^{(5–7)}, [10–5]	(Chinese Taipei) Jason Jung (United States) Evan King	(United States) Aleksandar Kovacevic (United States) Michael Mmoh	(Ecuador) Emilio Gómez (Japan) Taro Daniel (Denmark) Mikael Torpegaard (United States) Ernesto Escobedo
October 25	Lima Challenger II; Lima, Peru; Challenger 80 – Clay – 32S/16Q/16D; Singles – Doubles	(Chile) Nicolás Jarry; 6–2, 7–5	(Argentina) Juan Manuel Cerúndolo	(Czech Republic) Vít Kopřiva (Peru) Juan Pablo Varillas	(Chile) Marcelo Tomás Barrios Vera (Chile) Alejandro Tabilo (Argentina) Tomás Martín Etcheverry (Bolivia) Hugo Dellien
October 25	Lima Challenger II; Lima, Peru; Challenger 80 – Clay – 32S/16Q/16D; Singles – Doubles	(Peru) Sergio Galdós (Portugal) Gonçalo Oliveira; 6–2, 2–6, [10–5]	(Chile) Marcelo Tomás Barrios Vera (Chile) Alejandro Tabilo	(Czech Republic) Vít Kopřiva (Peru) Juan Pablo Varillas	(Chile) Marcelo Tomás Barrios Vera (Chile) Alejandro Tabilo (Argentina) Tomás Martín Etcheverry (Bolivia) Hugo Dellien

=== November ===
Week of	Tournament	Champions	Runners-up	Semifinalists	Quarterfinalists
November 1	Charlottesville Men's Pro Challenger; Charlottesville, United States; Challenger 80 – Hard (i) – 32S/16Q/16D; Singles – Doubles	(United States) Stefan Kozlov; 6–2, 6–3	(Australia) Aleksandar Vukic	(United States) J. J. Wolf (Canada) Brayden Schnur	(United States) Emilio Nava (United States) Thai-Son Kwiatkowski (United States) Jack Sock (India) Prajnesh Gunneswaran
November 1	Charlottesville Men's Pro Challenger; Charlottesville, United States; Challenger 80 – Hard (i) – 32S/16Q/16D; Singles – Doubles	(United States) William Blumberg (United States) Max Schnur; 3–6, 6–1, [14–12]	(Philippines) Treat Huey (Denmark) Frederik Nielsen	(United States) J. J. Wolf (Canada) Brayden Schnur	(United States) Emilio Nava (United States) Thai-Son Kwiatkowski (United States) Jack Sock (India) Prajnesh Gunneswaran
November 1	Trofeo Faip–Perrel; Bergamo, Italy; Challenger 80 – Hard (i) – 32S/16Q/16D; Singles – Doubles	(Denmark) Holger Rune; 7–5, 7–6^{(8–6)}	(Turkey) Cem İlkel	(Slovakia) Alex Molčan (Hungary) Fábián Marozsán	(Czech Republic) Zdeněk Kolář (Bosnia and Herzegovina) Damir Džumhur (United Kingdom) Liam Broady (Austria) Dennis Novak
November 1	Trofeo Faip–Perrel; Bergamo, Italy; Challenger 80 – Hard (i) – 32S/16Q/16D; Singles – Doubles	(Czech Republic) Zdeněk Kolář (Czech Republic) Jiří Lehečka; 6–4, 6–4	(United Kingdom) Lloyd Glasspool (Finland) Harri Heliövaara	(Slovakia) Alex Molčan (Hungary) Fábián Marozsán	(Czech Republic) Zdeněk Kolář (Bosnia and Herzegovina) Damir Džumhur (United Kingdom) Liam Broady (Austria) Dennis Novak
November 1	Challenger Eckental; Eckental, Germany; Challenger 80 – Carpet (i) – 32S/16Q/16D; Singles – Doubles	(Germany) Daniel Masur; 6–4, 6–4	(United States) Maxime Cressy	(Switzerland) Marc-Andrea Hüsler (Czech Republic) Tomáš Macháč	(Australia) Jordan Thompson (India) Ramkumar Ramanathan (Switzerland) Dominic Stricker (Czech Republic) Jiří Veselý
November 1	Challenger Eckental; Eckental, Germany; Challenger 80 – Carpet (i) – 32S/16Q/16D; Singles – Doubles	(Czech Republic) Roman Jebavý (United Kingdom) Jonny O'Mara; 6–4, 7–5	(Belgium) Ruben Bemelmans (Germany) Daniel Masur	(Switzerland) Marc-Andrea Hüsler (Czech Republic) Tomáš Macháč	(Australia) Jordan Thompson (India) Ramkumar Ramanathan (Switzerland) Dominic Stricker (Czech Republic) Jiří Veselý
November 1	Challenger Ciudad de Guayaquil; Guayaquil, Ecuador; Challenger 80 – Clay – 32S/16Q/16D; Singles – Doubles	(Chile) Alejandro Tabilo; 6–1, 7–5	(Netherlands) Jesper de Jong	(Brazil) Thiago Seyboth Wild (Argentina) Tomás Martín Etcheverry	(Portugal) Gonçalo Oliveira (Argentina) Nicolás Kicker (Colombia) Daniel Elahi Galán (Argentina) Facundo Bagnis
November 1	Challenger Ciudad de Guayaquil; Guayaquil, Ecuador; Challenger 80 – Clay – 32S/16Q/16D; Singles – Doubles	(Netherlands) Jesper de Jong (Netherlands) Bart Stevens; 7–5, 6–2	(Ecuador) Diego Hidalgo (Colombia) Cristian Rodríguez	(Brazil) Thiago Seyboth Wild (Argentina) Tomás Martín Etcheverry	(Portugal) Gonçalo Oliveira (Argentina) Nicolás Kicker (Colombia) Daniel Elahi Galán (Argentina) Facundo Bagnis
November 1	Tenerife Challenger; Tenerife, Spain; Challenger 80 – Hard – 32S/16Q/16D; Singles – Doubles	(Netherlands) Tallon Griekspoor; 6–4, 6–4	(Spain) Feliciano López	(Spain) Fernando Verdasco (Russia) Andrey Kuznetsov	(Turkey) Altuğ Çelikbilek (Portugal) Nuno Borges (Portugal) João Sousa (United Kingdom) Ryan Peniston
November 1	Tenerife Challenger; Tenerife, Spain; Challenger 80 – Hard – 32S/16Q/16D; Singles – Doubles	(Portugal) Nuno Borges (Portugal) Francisco Cabral; 6–3, 6–4	(India) Jeevan Nedunchezhiyan (India) Purav Raja	(Spain) Fernando Verdasco (Russia) Andrey Kuznetsov	(Turkey) Altuğ Çelikbilek (Portugal) Nuno Borges (Portugal) João Sousa (United Kingdom) Ryan Peniston
November 8	Open International de Tennis de Roanne; Roanne, France; Challenger 100 – Hard (i) – 32S/16Q/16D; Singles – Doubles	(France) Hugo Grenier; 6–2, 6–3	(Japan) Hiroki Moriya	(France) Manuel Guinard (France) Mathias Bourgue	(Netherlands) Jelle Sels (Italy) Andrea Arnaboldi (Moldova) Radu Albot (France) Arthur Cazaux
November 8	Open International de Tennis de Roanne; Roanne, France; Challenger 100 – Hard (i) – 32S/16Q/16D; Singles – Doubles	(United Kingdom) Lloyd Glasspool (Finland) Harri Heliövaara; 7–6^{(7–5)}, 6–7^{(5–7)}, [12–10]	(Monaco) Romain Arneodo (France) Albano Olivetti	(France) Manuel Guinard (France) Mathias Bourgue	(Netherlands) Jelle Sels (Italy) Andrea Arnaboldi (Moldova) Radu Albot (France) Arthur Cazaux
November 8	Slovak Open II; Bratislava, Slovakia; Challenger 90 – Hard (i) – 32S/16Q/16D; Singles – Doubles	(Netherlands) Tallon Griekspoor; 6–3, 6–2	(Hungary) Zsombor Piros	(Italy) Stefano Travaglia (Slovakia) Alex Molčan	(Germany) Maximilian Marterer (Portugal) Frederico Ferreira Silva (Bosnia and Herzegovina) Damir Džumhur (Czech Republic) Jiří Lehečka
November 8	Slovak Open II; Bratislava, Slovakia; Challenger 90 – Hard (i) – 32S/16Q/16D; Singles – Doubles	(Slovakia) Filip Horanský (Ukraine) Sergiy Stakhovsky; 6–4, 6–4	(Ukraine) Denys Molchanov (Kazakhstan) Aleksandr Nedovyesov	(Italy) Stefano Travaglia (Slovakia) Alex Molčan	(Germany) Maximilian Marterer (Portugal) Frederico Ferreira Silva (Bosnia and Herzegovina) Damir Džumhur (Czech Republic) Jiří Lehečka
November 8	Knoxville Challenger; Knoxville, United States; Challenger 80 – Hard (i) – 32S/16Q/16D; Singles – Doubles	(United States) Christopher Eubanks; 6–3, 6–4	(Germany) Daniel Altmaier	(United States) Bjorn Fratangelo (United States) Michael Mmoh	(United States) Emilio Nava (United States) Christian Harrison (United Kingdom) Aidan McHugh (United States) Jack Sock
November 8	Knoxville Challenger; Knoxville, United States; Challenger 80 – Hard (i) – 32S/16Q/16D; Singles – Doubles	(Tunisia) Malek Jaziri (Slovenia) Blaž Rola; 3–6, 6–3, [10–5]	(Mexico) Hans Hach Verdugo (Mexico) Miguel Ángel Reyes-Varela	(United States) Bjorn Fratangelo (United States) Michael Mmoh	(United States) Emilio Nava (United States) Christian Harrison (United Kingdom) Aidan McHugh (United States) Jack Sock
November 8	Uruguay Open; Montevideo, Uruguay; Challenger 80 – Clay – 32S/16Q/16D; Singles – Doubles	(Bolivia) Hugo Dellien; 6–0, 6–1	(Argentina) Juan Ignacio Londero	(Argentina) Federico Coria (Spain) Jaume Munar	(Argentina) Santiago Rodríguez Taverna (Argentina) Facundo Bagnis (Brazil) Thiago Monteiro (Argentina) Camilo Ugo Carabelli
November 8	Uruguay Open; Montevideo, Uruguay; Challenger 80 – Clay – 32S/16Q/16D; Singles – Doubles	(Brazil) Rafael Matos (Brazil) Felipe Meligeni Alves; 6–4, 6–4	(Uruguay) Ignacio Carou (Italy) Luciano Darderi	(Argentina) Federico Coria (Spain) Jaume Munar	(Argentina) Santiago Rodríguez Taverna (Argentina) Facundo Bagnis (Brazil) Thiago Monteiro (Argentina) Camilo Ugo Carabelli
November 8	Sparkassen ATP Challenger; Ortisei, Italy; Challenger 80 – Hard (i) – 32S/16Q/16D; Singles – Doubles	(Germany) Oscar Otte; 7–6^{(7–5)}, 6–4	(United States) Maxime Cressy	(United Kingdom) Jack Draper (Bosnia and Herzegovina) Mirza Bašić	(United Kingdom) Ryan Peniston (Italy) Federico Gaio (Ukraine) Vitaliy Sachko (Romania) Marius Copil
November 8	Sparkassen ATP Challenger; Ortisei, Italy; Challenger 80 – Hard (i) – 32S/16Q/16D; Singles – Doubles	(Croatia) Antonio Šančić (Austria) Tristan-Samuel Weissborn; 7–6^{(10–8)}, 4–6, [10–8]	(Austria) Alexander Erler (Austria) Lucas Miedler	(United Kingdom) Jack Draper (Bosnia and Herzegovina) Mirza Bašić	(United Kingdom) Ryan Peniston (Italy) Federico Gaio (Ukraine) Vitaliy Sachko (Romania) Marius Copil
November 15	Teréga Open Pau–Pyrénées; Pau, France; Challenger 100 – Hard (i) – 32S/16Q/16D; Singles – Doubles	(Moldova) Radu Albot; 6–2, 7–6^{(7–5)}	(Czech Republic) Jiří Lehečka	(Ukraine) Sergiy Stakhovsky (Denmark) Holger Rune	(Spain) Feliciano López (Slovakia) Norbert Gombos (France) Harold Mayot (United States) Maxime Cressy
November 15	Teréga Open Pau–Pyrénées; Pau, France; Challenger 100 – Hard (i) – 32S/16Q/16D; Singles – Doubles	(Monaco) Romain Arneodo (Austria) Tristan-Samuel Weissborn; 6–4, 6–2	(Pakistan) Aisam-ul-Haq Qureshi (Spain) David Vega Hernández	(Ukraine) Sergiy Stakhovsky (Denmark) Holger Rune	(Spain) Feliciano López (Slovakia) Norbert Gombos (France) Harold Mayot (United States) Maxime Cressy
November 15	Tali Open; Helsinki, Finland; Challenger 80 – Hard (i) – 32S/16Q/16D; Singles – Doubles	(Slovakia) Alex Molčan; 6–3, 6–2	(Portugal) João Sousa	(Russia) Alexander Shevchenko (Switzerland) Henri Laaksonen	(Germany) Mats Moraing (Germany) Oscar Otte (United Kingdom) Liam Broady (Serbia) Nikola Milojević
November 15	Tali Open; Helsinki, Finland; Challenger 80 – Hard (i) – 32S/16Q/16D; Singles – Doubles	(Austria) Alexander Erler (Austria) Lucas Miedler; 6–3, 7–6^{(7–2)}	(Finland) Harri Heliövaara (Netherlands) Jean-Julien Rojer	(Russia) Alexander Shevchenko (Switzerland) Henri Laaksonen	(Germany) Mats Moraing (Germany) Oscar Otte (United Kingdom) Liam Broady (Serbia) Nikola Milojević
November 15	Campeonato Internacional de Tênis de Campinas; Campinas, Brazil; Challenger 80 – Clay – 32S/16Q/16D; Singles – Doubles	(Argentina) Sebastián Báez; 6–1, 6–4	(Brazil) Thiago Monteiro	(Argentina) Tomás Martín Etcheverry (Argentina) Francisco Cerúndolo	(Chile) Nicolás Jarry (Kazakhstan) Timofey Skatov (Argentina) Juan Manuel Cerúndolo (Argentina) Santiago Rodríguez Taverna
November 15	Campeonato Internacional de Tênis de Campinas; Campinas, Brazil; Challenger 80 – Clay – 32S/16Q/16D; Singles – Doubles	(Brazil) Rafael Matos (Brazil) Felipe Meligeni Alves; 6–3, 6–1	(Brazil) Gilbert Klier Júnior (Brazil) Matheus Pucinelli de Almeida	(Argentina) Tomás Martín Etcheverry (Argentina) Francisco Cerúndolo	(Chile) Nicolás Jarry (Kazakhstan) Timofey Skatov (Argentina) Juan Manuel Cerúndolo (Argentina) Santiago Rodríguez Taverna
November 15	JSM Challenger of Champaign–Urbana; Champaign, United States; Challenger 80 – Hard (i) – 32S/16Q/16D; Singles – Doubles	(United States) Stefan Kozlov; 5–7, 6–3, 6–4	(Australia) Aleksandar Vukic	(Japan) Yosuke Watanuki (United States) J. J. Wolf	(United States) Ben Shelton (Japan) Go Soeda (United States) Vasil Kirkov (United States) Mitchell Krueger
November 15	JSM Challenger of Champaign–Urbana; Champaign, United States; Challenger 80 – Hard (i) – 32S/16Q/16D; Singles – Doubles	(United States) Nathaniel Lammons (United States) Jackson Withrow; 6–4, 3–6, [10–6]	(Philippines) Treat Huey (United States) Max Schnur	(Japan) Yosuke Watanuki (United States) J. J. Wolf	(United States) Ben Shelton (Japan) Go Soeda (United States) Vasil Kirkov (United States) Mitchell Krueger
November 22	Open Città di Bari; Bari, Italy; Challenger 80 – Hard – 32S/16Q/16D; Singles – Doubles	(Germany) Oscar Otte; 7–5, 7–5	(Germany) Daniel Masur	(Italy) Thomas Fabbiano (Italy) Andrea Vavassori	(Italy) Raúl Brancaccio (Italy) Flavio Cobolli (Italy) Luca Nardi (Italy) Filippo Baldi
November 22	Open Città di Bari; Bari, Italy; Challenger 80 – Hard – 32S/16Q/16D; Singles – Doubles	(United Kingdom) Lloyd Glasspool (Finland) Harri Heliövaara; 6–3, 6–0	(Italy) Andrea Vavassori (Spain) David Vega Hernández	(Italy) Thomas Fabbiano (Italy) Andrea Vavassori	(Italy) Raúl Brancaccio (Italy) Flavio Cobolli (Italy) Luca Nardi (Italy) Filippo Baldi
November 22	Aberto da República; Brasília, Brazil; Challenger 80 – Clay – 32S/16Q/16D; Singles – Doubles	(Argentina) Federico Coria; 7–5, 6–3	(Spain) Jaume Munar	(Argentina) Francisco Cerúndolo (Argentina) Pedro Cachin	(Argentina) Juan Ignacio Londero (Argentina) Hernán Casanova (Argentina) Nicolás Kicker (Brazil) Thiago Seyboth Wild
November 22	Aberto da República; Brasília, Brazil; Challenger 80 – Clay – 32S/16Q/16D; Singles – Doubles	(Brazil) Mateus Alves (Brazil) Gustavo Heide; 6–3, 6–3	(Italy) Luciano Darderi (Argentina) Genaro Alberto Olivieri	(Argentina) Francisco Cerúndolo (Argentina) Pedro Cachin	(Argentina) Juan Ignacio Londero (Argentina) Hernán Casanova (Argentina) Nicolás Kicker (Brazil) Thiago Seyboth Wild
November 22	Bahrain Ministry of Interior Tennis Challenger; Manama, Bahrain; Challenger 80 – Hard – 32S/16Q/16D; Singles – Doubles	(India) Ramkumar Ramanathan; 6–1, 6–4	(Russia) Evgeny Karlovskiy	(United Kingdom) Jay Clarke (Turkey) Yankı Erel	(Portugal) Gonçalo Oliveira (Bulgaria) Alexandar Lazarov (United Kingdom) Ryan Peniston (Portugal) Nuno Borges
November 22	Bahrain Ministry of Interior Tennis Challenger; Manama, Bahrain; Challenger 80 – Hard – 32S/16Q/16D; Singles – Doubles	(Portugal) Nuno Borges (Portugal) Francisco Cabral; 7–5, 6–7^{(5–7)}, [10–8]	(Austria) Maximilian Neuchrist (Greece) Michail Pervolarakis	(United Kingdom) Jay Clarke (Turkey) Yankı Erel	(Portugal) Gonçalo Oliveira (Bulgaria) Alexandar Lazarov (United Kingdom) Ryan Peniston (Portugal) Nuno Borges
November 22	Puerto Vallarta Open; Puerto Vallarta, Mexico; Challenger 80 – Hard – 32S/16Q/16D; Singles – Doubles	(Germany) Daniel Altmaier; 6–3, 3–6, 6–3	(Chile) Alejandro Tabilo	(Japan) Yosuke Watanuki (United States) Michael Mmoh	(Uruguay) Pablo Cuevas (Japan) Tatsuma Ito (Japan) Kaichi Uchida (United States) Zachary Svajda
November 22	Puerto Vallarta Open; Puerto Vallarta, Mexico; Challenger 80 – Hard – 32S/16Q/16D; Singles – Doubles	(Netherlands) Gijs Brouwer (United States) Reese Stalder; 6–4, 6–4	(Mexico) Hans Hach Verdugo (Mexico) Miguel Ángel Reyes-Varela	(Japan) Yosuke Watanuki (United States) Michael Mmoh	(Uruguay) Pablo Cuevas (Japan) Tatsuma Ito (Japan) Kaichi Uchida (United States) Zachary Svajda
November 29	São Paulo Challenger de Tênis; São Paulo, Brazil; Challenger 80 – Clay – 32S/16Q/16D; Singles – Doubles	(Argentina) Juan Pablo Ficovich; 6–3, 7–5	(Italy) Luciano Darderi	(Brazil) Felipe Meligeni Alves (Chile) Nicolás Jarry	(Argentina) Andrea Collarini (Argentina) Facundo Díaz Acosta (Brazil) Gustavo Heide (Bolivia) Hugo Dellien
November 29	São Paulo Challenger de Tênis; São Paulo, Brazil; Challenger 80 – Clay – 32S/16Q/16D; Singles – Doubles	(Colombia) Nicolás Barrientos (Colombia) Alejandro Gómez; Walkover	(Brazil) Rafael Matos (Brazil) Felipe Meligeni Alves	(Brazil) Felipe Meligeni Alves (Chile) Nicolás Jarry	(Argentina) Andrea Collarini (Argentina) Facundo Díaz Acosta (Brazil) Gustavo Heide (Bolivia) Hugo Dellien
November 29	Città di Forlì II; Forlì, Italy; Challenger 80 – Hard (i) – 32S/16Q/16D; Singles – Doubles	(United States) Maxime Cressy; 6–4, 6–2	(Germany) Matthias Bachinger	(Austria) Jurij Rodionov (Netherlands) Jelle Sels	(Turkey) Altuğ Çelikbilek (Italy) Flavio Cobolli (Russia) Alexey Vatutin (Germany) Julian Lenz
November 29	Città di Forlì II; Forlì, Italy; Challenger 80 – Hard (i) – 32S/16Q/16D; Singles – Doubles	(Croatia) Antonio Šančić (Austria) Tristan-Samuel Weissborn; 7–6^{(7–4)}, 4–6, [10–7]	(Czech Republic) Lukáš Rosol (Ukraine) Vitaliy Sachko	(Austria) Jurij Rodionov (Netherlands) Jelle Sels	(Turkey) Altuğ Çelikbilek (Italy) Flavio Cobolli (Russia) Alexey Vatutin (Germany) Julian Lenz
November 29	Antalya Challenger III; Antalya, Turkey; Challenger 50 – Clay – 32S/16Q/16D; Singles – Doubles	(Portugal) Nuno Borges; 6–4, 6–3	(United Kingdom) Ryan Peniston	(Spain) Javier Barranco Cosano (Spain) Eduard Esteve Lobato	(Romania) Filip Jianu (Croatia) Duje Ajduković (Dominican Republic) Nick Hardt (India) Ramkumar Ramanathan
November 29	Antalya Challenger III; Antalya, Turkey; Challenger 50 – Clay – 32S/16Q/16D; Singles – Doubles	(Italy) Riccardo Bonadio (Italy) Giovanni Fonio; 3–6, 6–2, [12–10]	(Chinese Taipei) Hsu Yu-hsiou (Chinese Taipei) Tseng Chun-hsin	(Spain) Javier Barranco Cosano (Spain) Eduard Esteve Lobato	(Romania) Filip Jianu (Croatia) Duje Ajduković (Dominican Republic) Nick Hardt (India) Ramkumar Ramanathan

=== December ===
Week of	Tournament	Champions	Runners-up	Semifinalists	Quarterfinalists
December 6	Città di Forlì III; Forlì, Italy; Challenger 80 – Hard (i) – 32S/16Q/16D; Singles – Doubles	(Russia) Pavel Kotov; 6–4, 6–3	(Italy) Andrea Arnaboldi	(Ukraine) Vitaliy Sachko (Italy) Luca Nardi	(United States) Maxime Cressy (Bosnia and Herzegovina) Mirza Bašić (Greece) Michail Pervolarakis (Bosnia and Herzegovina) Aldin Šetkić
December 6	Città di Forlì III; Forlì, Italy; Challenger 80 – Hard (i) – 32S/16Q/16D; Singles – Doubles	(Austria) Alexander Erler (Austria) Lucas Miedler; 6–4, 6–2	(Italy) Marco Bortolotti (Spain) Sergio Martos Gornés	(Ukraine) Vitaliy Sachko (Italy) Luca Nardi	(United States) Maxime Cressy (Bosnia and Herzegovina) Mirza Bašić (Greece) Michail Pervolarakis (Bosnia and Herzegovina) Aldin Šetkić
December 6	Maia Challenger; Maia, Portugal; Challenger 80 – Clay (i) – 32S/16Q/16D; Singles – Doubles	(France) Geoffrey Blancaneaux; 3–6, 6–3, 6–2	(Chinese Taipei) Tseng Chun-hsin	(Slovakia) Andrej Martin (Portugal) Nuno Borges	(Germany) Louis Wessels (France) Calvin Hemery (Portugal) Gastão Elias (Belgium) Kimmer Coppejans
December 6	Maia Challenger; Maia, Portugal; Challenger 80 – Clay (i) – 32S/16Q/16D; Singles – Doubles	(Portugal) Nuno Borges (Portugal) Francisco Cabral; 6–3, 6–4	(Slovakia) Andrej Martin (Portugal) Gonçalo Oliveira	(Slovakia) Andrej Martin (Portugal) Nuno Borges	(Germany) Louis Wessels (France) Calvin Hemery (Portugal) Gastão Elias (Belgium) Kimmer Coppejans
December 6	Florianópolis Challenger; Florianópolis, Brazil; Challenger 80 – Clay – 32S/16Q/16D; Singles – Doubles	(Brazil) Igor Marcondes; 6–2, 6–4	(Bolivia) Hugo Dellien	(Argentina) Juan Ignacio Londero (Argentina) Genaro Alberto Olivieri	(Uruguay) Pablo Cuevas (Brazil) Daniel Dutra da Silva (Colombia) Nicolás Barrientos (Argentina) Facundo Juárez
December 6	Florianópolis Challenger; Florianópolis, Brazil; Challenger 80 – Clay – 32S/16Q/16D; Singles – Doubles	(Colombia) Nicolás Barrientos (Colombia) Alejandro Gómez; 6–3, 6–3	(Uruguay) Martín Cuevas (Brazil) Rafael Matos	(Argentina) Juan Ignacio Londero (Argentina) Genaro Alberto Olivieri	(Uruguay) Pablo Cuevas (Brazil) Daniel Dutra da Silva (Colombia) Nicolás Barrientos (Argentina) Facundo Juárez
December 6	Antalya Challenger IV; Antalya, Turkey; Challenger 50 – Clay – 32S/16Q/16D; Singles – Doubles	(Russia) Evgenii Tiurnev; 3–6, 6–4, 6–4	(Ukraine) Oleg Prihodko	(Italy) Giovanni Fonio (Bosnia and Herzegovina) Nerman Fatić	(Turkey) Cem İlkel (Dominican Republic) Nick Hardt (Croatia) Duje Ajduković (Bulgaria) Alexandar Lazarov
December 6	Antalya Challenger IV; Antalya, Turkey; Challenger 50 – Clay – 32S/16Q/16D; Singles – Doubles	(Chinese Taipei) Hsu Yu-hsiou (Ukraine) Oleksii Krutykh; 6–1, 7–6^{(7–5)}	(Uzbekistan) Sanjar Fayziev (Greece) Markos Kalovelonis	(Italy) Giovanni Fonio (Bosnia and Herzegovina) Nerman Fatić	(Turkey) Cem İlkel (Dominican Republic) Nick Hardt (Croatia) Duje Ajduković (Bulgaria) Alexandar Lazarov
December 13	Maia Challenger II; Maia, Portugal; Challenger 80 – Clay (i) – 32S/16Q/16D; Singles – Doubles	(Chinese Taipei) Tseng Chun-hsin; 5–7, 7–5, 6–2	(Portugal) Nuno Borges	(Slovakia) Andrej Martin (Morocco) Elliot Benchetrit	(Germany) Sebastian Fanselow (Spain) Eduard Esteve Lobato (Spain) Nikolás Sánchez Izquierdo (Germany) Elmar Ejupovic
December 13	Maia Challenger II; Maia, Portugal; Challenger 80 – Clay (i) – 32S/16Q/16D; Singles – Doubles	(Portugal) Nuno Borges (Portugal) Francisco Cabral; 6–4, 7–5	(Poland) Piotr Matuszewski (Austria) David Pichler	(Slovakia) Andrej Martin (Morocco) Elliot Benchetrit	(Germany) Sebastian Fanselow (Spain) Eduard Esteve Lobato (Spain) Nikolás Sánchez Izquierdo (Germany) Elmar Ejupovic
December 13	Rio Tennis Classic; Rio de Janeiro, Brazil; Challenger 80 – Hard – 32S/16Q/16D; Singles – Doubles	(Japan) Kaichi Uchida; 3–6, 6–3, 7–6^{(7–3)}	(Spain) Nicolás Álvarez Varona	(Brazil) Gabriel Décamps (Argentina) Nicolás Kicker	(Brazil) Thiago Seyboth Wild (Brazil) Daniel Dutra da Silva (United States) Roy Smith (Brazil) Mateus Alves
December 13	Rio Tennis Classic; Rio de Janeiro, Brazil; Challenger 80 – Hard – 32S/16Q/16D; Singles – Doubles	(Brazil) Orlando Luz (Brazil) Rafael Matos; 6–3, 7–6^{(7–2)}	(United States) James Cerretani (Brazil) Fernando Romboli	(Brazil) Gabriel Décamps (Argentina) Nicolás Kicker	(Brazil) Thiago Seyboth Wild (Brazil) Daniel Dutra da Silva (United States) Roy Smith (Brazil) Mateus Alves

== Cancelled tournaments ==
The following tournaments were formally announced by the ATP before being subsequently cancelled due to the COVID-19 pandemic.

Week of	Tournament
April 12	Santa Cruz Challenger; Santa Cruz de la Sierra, Bolivia; Challenger 80 – Clay
April 19	Challenger Concepción II; Concepción, Chile; Challenger 80 – Clay

== Statistical information ==
These tables present the number of singles (S) and doubles (D) titles won by each player and each nation during the season. The players/nations are sorted by: 1) total number of titles (a doubles title won by two players representing the same nation counts as only one win for the nation); 2) a singles > doubles hierarchy; 3) alphabetical order (by family names for players).

To avoid confusion and double counting, these tables should be updated only after an event is completed.

=== Titles won by player ===
Total	Player	S	D	S	D
8	Tallon Griekspoor (NED)	● ● ● ● ● ● ● ●		8	0
8	Orlando Luz (BRA)		● ● ● ● ● ● ● ●	0	8
7	Benjamin Bonzi (FRA)	● ● ● ● ● ●	●	6	1
7	Zdeněk Kolář (CZE)	● ● ●	● ● ● ●	3	4
7	Nuno Borges (POR)	●	● ● ● ● ● ●	1	6
7	Rafael Matos (BRA)		● ● ● ● ● ● ●	0	7
7	Aleksandr Nedovyesov (KAZ)		● ● ● ● ● ● ●	0	7
6	Sebastián Báez (ARG)	● ● ● ● ● ●		6	0
6	Francisco Cabral (POR)		● ● ● ● ● ●	0	6
5	Stefan Kozlov (USA)	● ● ●	● ●	3	2
5	Jiří Lehečka (CZE)	● ●	● ● ●	2	3
5	Jesper de Jong (NED)	●	● ● ● ●	1	4
5	Sadio Doumbia (FRA)		● ● ● ● ●	0	5
5	Felipe Meligeni Alves (BRA)		● ● ● ● ●	0	5
5	Denys Molchanov (UKR)		● ● ● ● ●	0	5
5	Fabien Reboul (FRA)		● ● ● ● ●	0	5
4	Holger Rune (DEN)	● ● ● ●		4	0
4	Oscar Otte (GER)	● ● ●	●	3	1
4	Nicolás Jarry (CHI)	● ●	● ●	2	2
4	Daniel Masur (GER)	● ●	● ●	2	2
4	Nicolás Barrientos (COL)		● ● ● ●	0	4
4	Sergio Galdós (PER)		● ● ● ●	0	4
4	Lloyd Glasspool (GBR)		● ● ● ●	0	4
4	Harri Heliövaara (FIN)		● ● ● ●	0	4
4	Nathaniel Lammons (USA)		● ● ● ●	0	4
4	Matt Reid (AUS)		● ● ● ●	0	4
4	Antonio Šančić (CRO)		● ● ● ●	0	4
4	Max Schnur (USA)		● ● ● ●	0	4
4	Tristan-Samuel Weissborn (AUT)		● ● ● ●	0	4
3	Daniel Altmaier (GER)	● ● ●		3	0
3	Zizou Bergs (BEL)	● ● ●		3	0
3	Jenson Brooksby (USA)	● ● ●		3	0
3	Juan Manuel Cerúndolo (ARG)	● ● ●		3	0
3	Carlos Taberner (ESP)	● ● ●		3	0
3	Tomás Martín Etcheverry (ARG)	● ●	●	2	1
3	Christopher Eubanks (USA)	● ●	●	2	1
3	Mitchell Krueger (USA)	● ●	●	2	1
3	Alex Molčan (SVK)	● ●	●	2	1
3	Mats Moraing (GER)	● ●	●	2	1
3	Ruben Bemelmans (BEL)	●	● ●	1	2
3	Blaž Rola (SLO)	●	● ●	1	2
3	William Blumberg (USA)		● ● ●	0	3
3	Alexander Erler (AUT)		● ● ●	0	3
3	Alejandro Gómez (COL)		● ● ●	0	3
3	Hsu Yu-hsiou (TPE)		● ● ●	0	3
3	Roman Jebavý (CZE)		● ● ●	0	3
3	Evan King (USA)		● ● ●	0	3
3	Luis David Martínez (VEN)		● ● ●	0	3
3	Lucas Miedler (AUT)		● ● ●	0	3
3	Gonçalo Oliveira (POR)		● ● ●	0	3
3	Marc Polmans (AUS)		● ● ●	0	3
3	Vitaliy Sachko (UKR)		● ● ●	0	3
3	Sergiy Stakhovsky (UKR)		● ● ●	0	3
3	Tim van Rijthoven (NED)		● ● ●	0	3
3	Andrea Vavassori (ITA)		● ● ●	0	3
3	David Vega Hernández (ESP)		● ● ●	0	3
3	Szymon Walków (POL)		● ● ●	0	3
3	Jackson Withrow (USA)		● ● ●	0	3
3	Jan Zieliński (POL)		● ● ●	0	3
2	Franco Agamenone (ITA)	● ●		2	0
2	Altuğ Çelikbilek (TUR)	● ●		2	0
2	Federico Coria (ARG)	● ●		2	0
2	Hugo Dellien (BOL)	● ●		2	0
2	Brandon Nakashima (USA)	● ●		2	0
2	Evgenii Tiurnev (RUS)	● ●		2	0
2	Juan Pablo Varillas (PER)	● ●		2	0
2	Bernabé Zapata Miralles (ESP)	● ●		2	0
2	Radu Albot (MDA)	●	●	1	1
2	Facundo Bagnis (ARG)	●	●	1	1
2	Pedro Cachin (ARG)	●	●	1	1
2	Enzo Couacaud (FRA)	●	●	1	1
2	Pablo Cuevas (URU)	●	●	1	1
2	Gerald Melzer (AUT)	●	●	1	1
2	Facundo Mena (ARG)	●	●	1	1
2	Ramkumar Ramanathan (IND)	●	●	1	1
2	Jack Sock (USA)	●	●	1	1
2	Dominic Stricker (SUI)	●	●	1	1
2	Thiago Agustín Tirante (ARG)	●	●	1	1
2	Giulio Zeppieri (ITA)	●	●	1	1
2	Andre Begemann (GER)		● ●	0	2
2	Marco Bortolotti (ITA)		● ●	0	2
2	Dustin Brown (GER)		● ●	0	2
2	Guillermo Durán (ARG)		● ●	0	2
2	Robert Galloway (USA)		● ●	0	2
2	André Göransson (SWE)		● ●	0	2
2	Manuel Guinard (FRA)		● ●	0	2
2	Quentin Halys (FRA)		● ●	0	2
2	Christian Harrison (USA)		● ●	0	2
2	Diego Hidalgo (ECU)		● ●	0	2
2	Alex Lawson (USA)		● ●	0	2
2	Julian Lenz (GER)		● ●	0	2
2	Benjamin Lock (ZIM)		● ●	0	2
2	Sergio Martos Gornés (ESP)		● ●	0	2
2	Andrés Molteni (ARG)		● ●	0	2
2	Albano Olivetti (FRA)		● ●	0	2
2	Peter Polansky (CAN)		● ●	0	2
2	Roberto Quiroz (ECU)		● ●	0	2
2	Hunter Reese (USA)		● ●	0	2
2	Miguel Ángel Reyes-Varela (MEX)		● ●	0	2
2	Cristian Rodríguez (COL)		● ●	0	2
2	Bart Stevens (NED)		● ●	0	2
2	Sem Verbeek (NED)		● ●	0	2
2	Igor Zelenay (SVK)		● ●	0	2
1	Carlos Alcaraz (ESP)	●		1	0
1	Marcelo Tomás Barrios Vera (CHI)	●		1	0
1	Geoffrey Blancaneaux (FRA)	●		1	0
1	Alex Bolt (AUS)	●		1	0
1	Liam Broady (GBR)	●		1	0
1	Roberto Carballés Baena (ESP)	●		1	0
1	Francisco Cerúndolo (ARG)	●		1	0
1	Maxime Cressy (USA)	●		1	0
1	James Duckworth (AUS)	●		1	0
1	Gastão Elias (POR)	●		1	0
1	Juan Pablo Ficovich (ARG)	●		1	0
1	Bjorn Fratangelo (USA)	●		1	0
1	Carlos Gimeno Valero (ESP)	●		1	0
1	Emilio Gómez (ECU)	●		1	0
1	Hugo Grenier (FRA)	●		1	0
1	Thanasi Kokkinakis (AUS)	●		1	0
1	Sebastian Korda (USA)	●		1	0
1	Pavel Kotov (RUS)	●		1	0
1	Jason Kubler (AUS)	●		1	0
1	Dimitar Kuzmanov (BUL)	●		1	0
1	Andrey Kuznetsov (RUS)	●		1	0
1	Kwon Soon-woo (KOR)	●		1	0
1	Henri Laaksonen (SUI)	●		1	0
1	Lukáš Lacko (SVK)	●		1	0
1	Constant Lestienne (FRA)	●		1	0
1	Tomáš Macháč (CZE)	●		1	0
1	Gianluca Mager (ITA)	●		1	0
1	Illya Marchenko (UKR)	●		1	0
1	Igor Marcondes (BRA)	●		1	0
1	Pedro Martínez (ESP)	●		1	0
1	Mackenzie McDonald (USA)	●		1	0
1	Nikola Milojević (SRB)	●		1	0
1	Thiago Monteiro (BRA)	●		1	0
1	Gian Marco Moroni (ITA)	●		1	0
1	Jaume Munar (ESP)	●		1	0
1	Andrea Pellegrino (ITA)	●		1	0
1	Dmitry Popko (KAZ)	●		1	0
1	Max Purcell (AUS)	●		1	0
1	Arthur Rinderknech (FRA)	●		1	0
1	Andreas Seppi (ITA)	●		1	0
1	Dalibor Svrčina (CZE)	●		1	0
1	Alejandro Tabilo (CHI)	●		1	0
1	Frances Tiafoe (USA)	●		1	0
1	Stefano Travaglia (ITA)	●		1	0
1	Tseng Chun-hsin (TPE)	●		1	0
1	Kaichi Uchida (JPN)	●		1	0
1	Camilo Ugo Carabelli (ARG)	●		1	0
1	Jiří Veselý (CZE)	●		1	0
1	Mario Vilella Martínez (ESP)	●		1	0
1	J. J. Wolf (USA)	●		1	0
1	Kacper Żuk (POL)	●		1	0
1	Mateus Alves (BRA)		●	0	1
1	Guido Andreozzi (ARG)		●	0	1
1	Romain Arneodo (MON)		●	0	1
1	Sriram Balaji (IND)		●	0	1
1	Grégoire Barrère (FRA)		●	0	1
1	Riccardo Bonadio (ITA)		●	0	1
1	Raúl Brancaccio (ITA)		●	0	1
1	Gijs Brouwer (NED)		●	0	1
1	Luca Castelnuovo (SUI)		●	0	1
1	Flavio Cobolli (ITA)		●	0	1
1	Victor Vlad Cornea (ROU)		●	0	1
1	Alexander Cozbinov (MDA)		●	0	1
1	Martín Cuevas (URU)		●	0	1
1	Luciano Darderi (ITA)		●	0	1
1	Liam Draxl (CAN)		●	0	1
1	Karol Drzewiecki (POL)		●	0	1
1	Ernesto Escobedo (USA)		●	0	1
1	Jonathan Eysseric (FRA)		●	0	1
1	Giovanni Fonio (ITA)		●	0	1
1	Jonáš Forejtek (CZE)		●	0	1
1	Francesco Forti (ITA)		●	0	1
1	Andrey Golubev (KAZ)		●	0	1
1	Ruben Gonzales (PHI)		●	0	1
1	Santiago González (MEX)		●	0	1
1	Hans Hach Verdugo (MEX)		●	0	1
1	Gustavo Heide (BRA)		●	0	1
1	Pierre-Hugues Herbert (FRA)		●	0	1
1	Antoine Hoang (FRA)		●	0	1
1	Filip Horanský (SVK)		●	0	1
1	Marc-Andrea Hüsler (SUI)		●	0	1
1	Dominic Inglot (GBR)		●	0	1
1	Malek Jaziri (TUN)		●	0	1
1	Hunter Johnson (USA)		●	0	1
1	Blaž Kavčič (SLO)		●	0	1
1	Raven Klaasen (RSA)		●	0	1
1	Lukáš Klein (SVK)		●	0	1
1	Vít Kopřiva (CZE)		●	0	1
1	Oleksii Krutykh (UKR)		●	0	1
1	Tristan Lamasine (FRA)		●	0	1
1	Vladyslav Manafov (UKR)		●	0	1
1	Andrej Martin (SVK)		●	0	1
1	Jeevan Nedunchezhiyan (IND)		●	0	1
1	Dennis Novikov (USA)		●	0	1
1	Hugo Nys (MON)		●	0	1
1	Jonny O'Mara (GBR)		●	0	1
1	Renzo Olivo (ARG)		●	0	1
1	David Pel (NED)		●	0	1
1	Tim Pütz (GER)		●	0	1
1	Purav Raja (IND)		●	0	1
1	Ruan Roelofse (RSA)		●	0	1
1	Fernando Romboli (BRA)		●	0	1
1	Ivan Sabanov (CRO)		●	0	1
1	Matej Sabanov (CRO)		●	0	1
1	Nino Serdarušić (CRO)		●	0	1
1	Igor Sijsling (NED)		●	0	1
1	Artem Sitak (NZL)		●	0	1
1	Ken Skupski (GBR)		●	0	1
1	Reese Stalder (USA)		●	0	1
1	Juan Bautista Torres (ARG)		●	0	1
1	Petros Tsitsipas (GRE)		●	0	1
1	Mark Vervoort (NED)		●	0	1
1	Michael Vrbenský (CZE)		●	0	1

=== Titles won by nation ===
Total	Nation	S	D
41	United States (USA)	19	22
28	Argentina (ARG)	20	8
23	France (FRA)	11	12
20	Germany (GER)	10	10
19	Netherlands (NED)	9	10
17	Czech Republic (CZE)	8	9
17	Italy (ITA)	8	9
16	Spain (ESP)	11	5
15	Brazil (BRA)	2	13
13	Ukraine (UKR)	1	12
11	Australia (AUS)	5	6
11	Portugal (POR)	2	9
9	Austria (AUT)	1	8
8	Slovakia (SVK)	3	5
8	Great Britain (GBR)	1	7
8	Kazakhstan (KAZ)	1	7
7	Colombia (COL)	0	7
6	Belgium (BEL)	4	2
6	Chile (CHI)	4	2
6	Peru (PER)	2	4
5	Switzerland (SUI)	2	3
5	Ecuador (ECU)	1	4
5	Poland (POL)	1	4
5	Croatia (CRO)	0	5
4	Denmark (DEN)	4	0
4	Russia (RUS)	4	0
4	Chinese Taipei (TPE)	1	3
4	Finland (FIN)	0	4
3	India (IND)	1	2
3	Slovenia (SLO)	1	2
3	Canada (CAN)	0	3
3	Mexico (MEX)	0	3
3	Venezuela (VEN)	0	3
2	Bolivia (BOL)	2	0
2	Turkey (TUR)	2	0
2	Moldova (MDA)	1	1
2	Uruguay (URU)	1	1
2	Monaco (MON)	0	2
2	Sweden (SWE)	0	2
2	Zimbabwe (ZIM)	0	2
1	Bulgaria (BUL)	1	0
1	Japan (JPN)	1	0
1	Serbia (SRB)	1	0
1	South Korea (KOR)	1	0
1	Greece (GRE)	0	1
1	New Zealand (NZL)	0	1
1	Philippines (PHI)	0	1
1	Romania (ROU)	0	1
1	South Africa (RSA)	0	1
1	Tunisia (TUN)	0	1

== Point distribution ==
Points are awarded as follows:

Tournament category	Singles									Doubles				
Tournament category	W	F	SF	QF	R16	R32	Q	Q2	Q1	W	F	SF	QF	R16
Challenger 125	125	75	45	25	10	0	5	2	0	125	75	45	25	0
Challenger 110	110	65	40	20	9	0	5	2	0	110	65	40	20	0
Challenger 100	100	60	35	18	8	0	5	2	0	100	60	35	18	0
Challenger 90	90	55	33	17	8	0	5	2	0	90	55	33	17	0
Challenger 80	80	48	29	15	7	0	4	2	0	80	48	29	15	0
Challenger 50	50	30	15	7	4	0	2	1	0	50	30	15	7	0
