= 2024 Argentina Open – Singles =

Singles
- 2024 Argentina Open

Final
- Champion: (Argentina) Facundo Díaz Acosta
- Runner-up: (Chile) Nicolás Jarry
- Score: 6–3, 6–4

Details
- Draw: 28 (4 Q / 3 WC )
- Seeds: 8

Events
Singles	Doubles
← 2023 ·	Argentina Open	· 2025 →

Facundo Díaz Acosta defeated Nicolás Jarry in the final, 6–3, 6–4 to win the singles tennis title at the 2024 Argentina Open. He did not lose a set en route to his first ATP Tour title and became the first wildcard to win the Argentina Open, as well as the first unseeded player to win the title since Alexandr Dolgopolov in 2017.

Carlos Alcaraz was the defending champion, but lost to Jarry in the semifinals.

== Seeds ==
The top four seeds received a bye into the second round.

1. (Spain) Carlos Alcaraz (semifinals)
2. (United Kingdom) Cameron Norrie (second round)
3. (Chile) Nicolás Jarry (final)
4. (Argentina) Francisco Cerúndolo (second round)
5. (Argentina) Sebastián Báez (quarterfinals)
6. (Argentina) Tomás Martín Etcheverry (quarterfinals, retired)
7. (Serbia) Laslo Djere (second round)
8. (France) Arthur Fils (first round)

== Draw ==
=== Key ===
- Q = Qualifier
- WC = Wild card
- LL = Lucky loser
- Alt = Alternate
- ITF = ITF entry
- PR = Protected ranking
- SR = Special ranking
- SE = Special exempt
- JE = Junior exempt
- JR = Junior Accelerator Programme entrant
- CO = College Accelerator Programme entrant
- NG = Next Gen Accelerator Program entrant
- w/o = Walkover
- r = Retired
- d = Defaulted

=== Finals ===
Semifinals
1	(Spain) Carlos Alcaraz	6^{2}	3
3	(Chile) Nicolás Jarry	7^{7}	6
WC	(Argentina) Facundo Díaz Acosta	6	6
SE	(Argentina) Federico Coria	2	3

Final
3	(Chile) Nicolás Jarry	3	4
WC	(Argentina) Facundo Díaz Acosta	6	6

=== Top half ===
First round
(Peru) JP Varillas	6^{5}	4
Q	(Argentina) C Ugo Carabelli	7^{7}	6
Q	(Italy) A Vavassori	6	6
(Brazil) T Seyboth Wild	3	1
WC	(Croatia) M Čilić	6	3	0
7	(Serbia) L Djere	4	6	6
(Switzerland) S Wawrinka	6^{4}	6	6
(Argentina) P Cachín	7^{7}	1	2
WC	(Argentina) D Schwartzman	6	1	4
Q	(Colombia) DE Galán	2	6	6
(Spain) R Carballés Baena	4	1
6	(Argentina) TM Etcheverry	6	6

Second round
1	(Spain) C Alcaraz	6	7
Q	(Argentina) C Ugo Carabelli	2	5
Q	(Italy) A Vavassori	6	7
7	(Serbia) L Djere	4	5
3	(Chile) N Jarry	6^{3}	6	7^{7}
(Switzerland) S Wawrinka	7^{7}	2	6^{5}
Q	(Colombia) DE Galán	3	0
6	(Argentina) TM Etcheverry	6	6

Quarterfinals
1	(Spain) C Alcaraz	7^{7}	6
Q	(Italy) A Vavassori	6^{1}	1
3	(Chile) N Jarry	4	7	0
6	(Argentina) TM Etcheverry	6	5	0^{r}

Semifinals
1	(Spain) C Alcaraz	6^{2}	3
3	(Chile) N Jarry	7^{7}	6

=== Bottom half ===
First round
8	(France) A Fils	3	4
(Serbia) D Lajović	6	6
(Germany) Y Hanfmann	1	3
(Chile) A Tabilo	6	6
WC	(Argentina) F Díaz Acosta	6	7^{7}
(Germany) D Altmaier	3	6^{1}
5	(Argentina) S Báez	6	6
(Spain) B Zapata Miralles	3	3
SE	(Italy) L Darderi	6	6
Q	(Argentina) M Navone	2	1
(Austria) S Ofner	5	6	5
SE	(Argentina) F Coria	7	4	7

Second round
(Serbia) D Lajović	6	1	6
(Chile) A Tabilo	4	6	1
WC	(Argentina) F Díaz Acosta	7^{7}	6
4	(Argentina) F Cerúndolo	6^{3}	0
5	(Argentina) S Báez	6	7
SE	(Italy) L Darderi	4	5
SE	(Argentina) F Coria	6	4	6
2	(United Kingdom) C Norrie	2	6	3

Quarterfinals
(Serbia) D Lajović	4	3
WC	(Argentina) F Díaz Acosta	6	6
5	(Argentina) S Báez	1	4
SE	(Argentina) F Coria	6	6

Semifinals
WC	(Argentina) F Díaz Acosta	6	6
SE	(Argentina) F Coria	2	3

== Qualifying ==
=== Seeds ===
1. (Spain) Jaume Munar (first round)
2. (Colombia) Daniel Elahi Galán (qualified)
3. (Spain) Albert Ramos Viñolas (first round)
4. (Spain) Pedro Martínez (withdrew)
5. (Chile) Tomás Barrios Vera (first round)
6. (Bolivia) Hugo Dellien (qualifying competition)
7. (Argentina) Mariano Navone (qualified)
8. (Brazil) Thiago Monteiro (qualifying competition)

=== Qualifiers ===
1. (Argentina) Camilo Ugo Carabelli
2. (Colombia) Daniel Elahi Galán
3. (Argentina) Mariano Navone
4. (Italy) Andrea Vavassori

=== Qualifying draw ===
==== First qualifier ====
First round
1	(Spain) Jaume Munar	2	6^{4}
WC	(Argentina) Camilo Ugo Carabelli	6	7^{7}
WC	(Argentina) Román Andrés Burruchaga	0	1
6	(Bolivia) Hugo Dellien	6	6

Qualifying competition
WC	(Argentina) Camilo Ugo Carabelli	4	7^{7}	6
6	(Bolivia) Hugo Dellien	6	6^{3}	3

==== Second qualifier ====
First round
2	(Colombia) Daniel Elahi Galán	6	7^{8}
(Slovakia) Alex Molčan	3	6^{6}
(Argentina) Francisco Comesaña	6	6
5	(Chile) Tomás Barrios Vera	3	4

Qualifying competition
2	(Colombia) Daniel Elahi Galán	6	5	6
(Argentina) Francisco Comesaña	3	7	2

==== Third qualifier ====
First round
3	(Spain) Albert Ramos Viñolas	1	4
Alt	(Brazil) Felipe Meligeni Alves	6	6
(France) Corentin Moutet	7	2	2
7	(Argentina) Mariano Navone	5	6	6

Qualifying competition
Alt	(Brazil) Felipe Meligeni Alves	6	1	4
7	(Argentina) Mariano Navone	4	6	6

==== Fourth qualifier ====
First round
Alt	(Italy) Andrea Pellegrino	1	6^{1}
Alt	(Italy) Andrea Vavassori	6	7^{7}
(Argentina) Juan Manuel Cerúndolo	6	4	2
8	(Brazil) Thiago Monteiro	4	6	6

Qualifying competition
Alt	(Italy) Andrea Vavassori	6	7^{7}
8	(Brazil) Thiago Monteiro	4	6^{5}
