= 2026 Argentina Open – Singles =

Singles
- 2026 Argentina Open

Final
- Champion: (Argentina) Francisco Cerúndolo
- Runner-up: (Italy) Luciano Darderi
- Score: 6–4, 6–2

Details
- Draw: 28 (4 Q / 3 WC )
- Seeds: 8

Events
Singles	Doubles
- Argentina Open

Francisco Cerúndolo defeated Luciano Darderi in the final, 6–4, 6–2 to win the singles tennis title at the 2026 Argentina Open. It was his first Argentina Open title, having finished runner-up in 2021 and 2025, and fourth ATP Tour title overall.

João Fonseca was the defending champion, but lost in the second round to Alejandro Tabilo.

This was the first time since 2009 that three Argentine players reached the semifinals. (Note: The fourth semifinalist, Luciano Darderi, was born and raised in Buenos Aires, but moved to Italy in 2012. He made his professional debut representing Italy in 2023.)

== Seeds ==
The top four seeds received a bye into the second round.

1. (Argentina) Francisco Cerúndolo (champion)
2. (Italy) Luciano Darderi (final)
3. (Brazil) João Fonseca (second round)
4. (Argentina) Sebastián Báez (semifinals)
5. (Germany) Daniel Altmaier (first round)
6. (Argentina) Camilo Ugo Carabelli (quarterfinals)
7. (Argentina) Tomás Martín Etcheverry (semifinals)
8. (Italy) Matteo Berrettini (second round)

== Draw ==
Key

- Q = Qualifier
- WC = Wild card
- LL = Lucky loser
- Alt = Alternate
- ITF = ITF entry
- PR = Protected ranking
- SR = Special ranking
- SE = Special exempt
- JE = Junior exempt
- JR = Junior Accelerator Programme entrant
- CO = College Accelerator Programme entrant
- NG = Next Gen Accelerator Program entrant
- w/o = Walkover
- r = Retired
- d = Defaulted

=== Finals ===
Semifinals
1	(Argentina) Francisco Cerúndolo	6	7
7	(Argentina) Tomás Martín Etcheverry	3	5
4	(Argentina) Sebastián Báez	6^{2}	1
2	(Italy) Luciano Darderi	7^{7}	6

Final
1	(Argentina) Francisco Cerúndolo	6	6
2	(Italy) Luciano Darderi	4	2

=== Top half ===
First round
(Bosnia and Herzegovina) D Džumhur	4	1
Q	(Bolivia) H Dellien	6	6
WC	(Argentina) A Barrena	4	6	4
(Czech Republic) V Kopřiva	6	3	6
WC	(Argentina) F Coria	5	5
8	(Italy) M Berrettini	7	7
WC	(Argentina) F Díaz Acosta	6^{5}	3
(Chile) A Tabilo	7^{7}	6
(Argentina) RA Burruchaga	6	6
(Serbia) L Djere	2	4
Q	(Italy) A Pellegrino	3	4
7	(Argentina) TM Etcheverry	6	6

Second round
1	(Argentina) F Cerúndolo	6	7^{8}
Q	(Bolivia) H Dellien	0	6^{6}
(Czech Republic) V Kopřiva	6	6
8	(Italy) M Berrettini	4	3
3	(Brazil) J Fonseca	3	6	5
(Chile) A Tabilo	6	3	7
(Argentina) RA Burruchaga	6^{5}	7^{7}	4
7	(Argentina) TM Etcheverry	7^{7}	6^{3}	6

Quarterfinals
1	(Argentina) F Cerúndolo	6	6
(Czech Republic) V Kopřiva	4	3
(Chile) A Tabilo	6	3	4
7	(Argentina) TM Etcheverry	1	6	6

Semifinals
1	(Argentina) F Cerúndolo	6	7
7	(Argentina) TM Etcheverry	3	5

=== Bottom half ===
First round
6	(Argentina) C Ugo Carabelli	6	7^{7}
(Argentina) F Comesaña	4	6^{3}
(Argentina) M Navone	6	6
(United States) E Nava	2	1
(Peru) I Buse	5	7	6
Q	(Italy) F Passaro	7	5	4
5	(Germany) D Altmaier	2	2
(Argentina) JM Cerúndolo	6	6
Q	(Argentina) L Midón	4	1
(Spain) P Martínez	6	6
(Chile) T Barrios Vera	4	6
LL	(Brazil) T Seyboth Wild	6	5^{r}

Second round
6	(Argentina) C Ugo Carabelli	6	7
(Argentina) M Navone	2	5
(Peru) I Buse	4	3
4	(Argentina) S Báez	6	6
(Argentina) JM Cerúndolo	6^{5}	4
(Spain) P Martínez	7^{7}	6
(Chile) T Barrios Vera	1	3
2	(Italy) L Darderi	6	6

Quarterfinals
6	(Argentina) C Ugo Carabelli	6^{5}	2
4	(Argentina) S Báez	7^{7}	6
(Spain) P Martínez	5	1
2	(Italy) L Darderi	7	6

Semifinals
4	(Argentina) S Báez	6^{2}	1
2	(Italy) L Darderi	7^{7}	6

== Qualifying ==
=== Seeds ===
1. (Italy) Andrea Pellegrino (qualified)
2. (Bolivia) Hugo Dellien (qualified)
3. (Italy) Francesco Passaro (qualified)
4. (Colombia) Daniel Elahi Galán (qualifying competition)
5. (Brazil) Thiago Seyboth Wild (qualifying competition, lucky loser)
6. (Brazil) Thiago Monteiro (qualifying competition)
7. (Italy) Marco Cecchinato (qualifying competition)
8. (Brazil) Felipe Meligeni Alves (first round)

=== Qualifiers ===
1. (Italy) Andrea Pellegrino
2. (Bolivia) Hugo Dellien
3. (Italy) Francesco Passaro
4. (Argentina) Lautaro Midón

=== Lucky loser ===
1. (Brazil) Thiago Seyboth Wild

=== Qualifying draw ===
==== First qualifier ====
First round
1	(Italy) Andrea Pellegrino	6	6
WC	(Argentina) Juan Manuel La Serna	1	3
(Argentina) Andrea Collarini	6^{8}	7^{7}	4
5	(Brazil) Thiago Seyboth Wild	7^{10}	6^{4}	6

Qualifying competition
1	(Italy) Andrea Pellegrino	7^{11}	6
5	(Brazil) Thiago Seyboth Wild	6^{9}	1

==== Second qualifier ====
First round
2	(Bolivia) Hugo Dellien	6	6
(Argentina) Genaro Alberto Olivieri	1	4
Alt	(Italy) Franco Agamenone	4	0
6	(Brazil) Thiago Monteiro	6	6

Qualifying competition
2	(Bolivia) Hugo Dellien	6	6
6	(Brazil) Thiago Monteiro	1	3

==== Third qualifier ====
First round
3	(Italy) Francesco Passaro	6	6
Alt	(Argentina) Nicolás Kicker	3	3
(Argentina) Santiago Rodríguez Taverna	3	3
7	(Italy) Marco Cecchinato	6	6

Qualifying competition
3	(Italy) Francesco Passaro	5	6	6
7	(Italy) Marco Cecchinato	7	4	2

==== Fourth qualifier ====
First round
4	(Colombia) Daniel Elahi Galán	6	7^{7}
WC	(Argentina) Juan Bautista Torres	2	6^{4}
(Argentina) Lautaro Midón	6	6
8	(Brazil) Felipe Meligeni Alves	2	2

Qualifying competition
4	(Colombia) Daniel Elahi Galán	4	6	3
(Argentina) Lautaro Midón	6	4	6
