= 2025 Argentina Open =

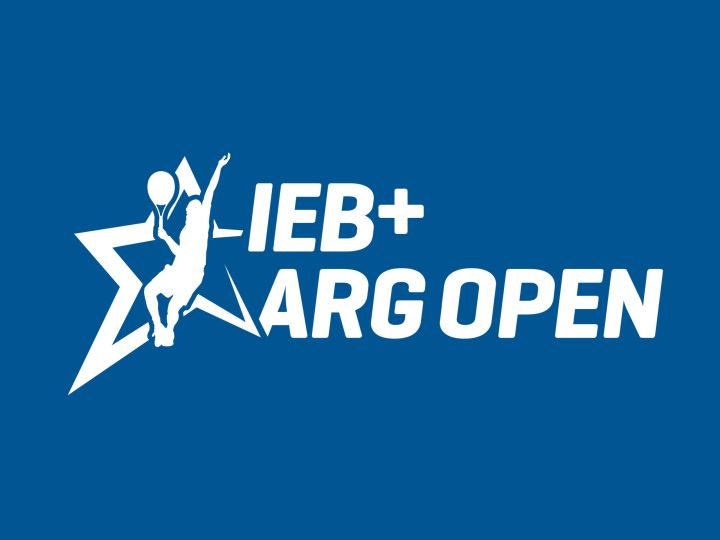
- Date: 10–16 February
- Edition: 28th
- Category: ATP Tour 250 series
- Draw: 28S / 16D
- Surface: Clay / outdoor
- Location: Buenos Aires, Argentina
- Venue: Buenos Aires Lawn Tennis Club

Champions

Singles
- (Brazil) João Fonseca

Doubles
- (Argentina) Guido Andreozzi / (France) Théo Arribagé
← 2024 ·	ATP Buenos Aires	· 2026 →

The 2025 IEB+ Argentina Open was a men's tennis tournament played on outdoor clay courts. It was the 28th edition of the ATP Buenos Aires event, and part of the ATP Tour 250 series of the 2025 ATP Tour. It took place in Buenos Aires, Argentina, from 10 to 16 February 2025.

== Champions ==
=== Singles ===
- (Brazil) João Fonseca def. (Argentina) Francisco Cerúndolo, 6–4, 7–6^{(7–1)}

=== Doubles ===
- (Argentina) Guido Andreozzi / (France) Théo Arribagé def. (Brazil) Rafael Matos / (Brazil) Marcelo Melo, 7–5, 4–6, [10–7]

== Singles main draw entrants ==
=== Seeds ===
Country	Player	Rank^{1}	Seed
GER	Alexander Zverev	2	1
DEN	Holger Rune	14	2
ITA	Lorenzo Musetti	17	3
CHI	Alejandro Tabilo	27	4
ARG	Francisco Cerúndolo	29	5
ARG	Sebastián Báez	31	6
CHI	Nicolás Jarry	38	7
ARG	Tomás Martín Etcheverry	40	8

- ^{1} Rankings are as of 3 February 2024.

=== Other entrants ===
The following players received wildcards into the singles main draw:

- (Argentina) Francisco Comesaña
- (Argentina) Diego Schwartzman
- (Argentina) Camilo Ugo Carabelli

The following player received entry under the ATP Next Gen programme for players aged under 20 and ranked in the top 350:

- (Brazil) João Fonseca

The following players received entry from the qualifying draw:

- (Argentina) Román Andrés Burruchaga
- (Argentina) Juan Manuel Cerúndolo
- (Serbia) Laslo Djere
- ~~(Italy) Francesco Passaro~~

The following players received entry as lucky losers:

- (Argentina) Federico Coria
- (India) Sumit Nagal

=== Withdrawals ===
- (Spain) Jaume Munar → replaced by (India) Sumit Nagal
- (Italy) Francesco Passaro → replaced by (Argentina) Federico Coria

== Doubles main draw entrants ==
=== Seeds ===
Country	Player	Country	Player	Rank^{1}	Seed
ARG	Máximo González	ARG	Andrés Molteni	48	1
FRA	Sadio Doumbia	FRA	Fabien Reboul	64	2
BRA	Rafael Matos	BRA	Marcelo Melo	77	3
AUT	Alexander Erler	GER	Constantin Frantzen	96	4

- ^{1} Rankings as of 3 February 2025.

=== Other entrants ===
The following pairs received wildcards into the doubles main draw:

- (Argentina) Román Andrés Burruchaga / (Argentina) Juan Bautista Torres
- (Argentina) Andrea Collarini / (Argentina) Guillermo Durán

The following pairs received entry as alternates:

- (Bolivia) Boris Arias / (Bolivia) Federico Zeballos
- (Argentina) Juan Pablo Ficovich / (Argentina) Mariano Kestelboim
- (Argentina) Lautaro Midón / (Argentina) Gonzalo Villanueva

=== Withdrawals ===
- (Spain) Pedro Martínez / (Spain) Jaume Munar → replaced by (Argentina) Juan Pablo Ficovich / (Argentina) Mariano Kestelboim
- (Spain) Roberto Carballés Baena / (France) Alexandre Müller → replaced by (Bolivia) Boris Arias / (Bolivia) Federico Zeballos
- (Argentina) Francisco Comesaña / (Brazil) Thiago Seyboth Wild → replaced by (Argentina) Lautaro Midón / (Argentina) Gonzalo Villanueva
