= 2021 Moneta Czech Open – Doubles =

Doubles
- 2021 Moneta Czech Open

Final
- Champions: (Kazakhstan) Aleksandr Nedovyesov (Portugal) Gonçalo Oliveira
- Runners-up: (Czech Republic) Roman Jebavý (Czech Republic) Zdeněk Kolář
- Score: 1–6, 7–6^{(7–5)}, [10–6]

Events
Singles	Doubles
- Moneta Czech Open

Zdeněk Kolář and Lukáš Rosol were the defending champions but only Kolář chose to defend his title, partnering Roman Jebavý. Kolář lost in the final to Aleksandr Nedovyesov and Gonçalo Oliveira.

Nedovyesov and Oliveira won the title after defeating Jebavý and Kolář 1–6, 7–6^{(7–5)}, [10–6] in the final.

== Seeds ==
1. (Kazakhstan) Aleksandr Nedovyesov / (Portugal) Gonçalo Oliveira (champions)
2. (Netherlands) Sander Arends / (Venezuela) Luis David Martínez (semifinals)
3. (Czech Republic) Roman Jebavý / (Czech Republic) Zdeněk Kolář (final)
4. (United States) Max Schnur / (Netherlands) Sem Verbeek (first round)

== Draw ==
Key

- Q = Qualifier
- WC = Wild card
- LL = Lucky loser
- Alt = Alternate
- ITF = ITF entry
- PR = Protected ranking
- SR = Special ranking
- SE = Special exempt
- JE = Junior exempt
- JR = Junior Accelerator Programme entrant
- CO = College Accelerator Programme entrant
- NG = Next Gen Accelerator Program entrant
- w/o = Walkover
- r = Retired
- d = Defaulted

First round
1	(Kazakhstan) A Nedovyesov (Portugal) G Oliveira	6	6
WC	(Czech Republic) A Paulson (Czech Republic) P Rikl	4	3
(Argentina) F Coria (Argentina) F Mena	6	7
(Czech Republic) J Forejtek (Czech Republic) M Vrbenský	3	5
4	(United States) M Schnur (Netherlands) S Verbeek	4	6	[5]
(Austria) A Erler (Austria) T-S Weissborn	6	4	[10]
(Bolivia) H Dellien (Bolivia) F Zeballos	7	6
(India) S Balaji (Switzerland) L Margaroli	5	4
WC	(Czech Republic) J Menšík (Czech Republic) D Siniakov	2	3
(Czech Republic) V Kopřiva (Czech Republic) J Lehečka	6	6
WC	(Czech Republic) Adam Jurajda (Czech Republic) D Svrčina	4	6^{6}
3	(Czech Republic) R Jebavý (Czech Republic) Z Kolář	6	7^{8}
(Netherlands) J Sels (Netherlands) M Vervoort	2	2
(Slovakia) J Kovalík (Slovakia) I Zelenay	6	6
(Czech Republic) D Poljak (Czech Republic) J Pospíšil	2	4
2	(Netherlands) S Arends (Venezuela) LD Martínez	6	6

Quarterfinals
1	(Kazakhstan) A Nedovyesov (Portugal) G Oliveira	6	6
(Argentina) F Coria (Argentina) F Mena	2	4
(Austria) A Erler (Austria) T-S Weissborn	6	6^{3}	[8]
(Bolivia) H Dellien (Bolivia) F Zeballos	4	7^{7}	[10]
(Czech Republic) V Kopřiva (Czech Republic) J Lehečka	4	6	[13]
3	(Czech Republic) R Jebavý (Czech Republic) Z Kolář	6	3	[15]
(Slovakia) J Kovalík (Slovakia) I Zelenay	6^{4}	1
2	(Netherlands) S Arends (Venezuela) LD Martínez	7^{7}	6

Semifinals
1	(Kazakhstan) A Nedovyesov (Portugal) G Oliveira	w/o
(Bolivia) H Dellien (Bolivia) F Zeballos
3	(Czech Republic) R Jebavý (Czech Republic) Z Kolář	6	2	[10]
2	(Netherlands) S Arends (Venezuela) LD Martínez	3	6	[5]

Final
1	(Kazakhstan) A Nedovyesov (Portugal) G Oliveira	1	7^{7}	[10]
3	(Czech Republic) R Jebavý (Czech Republic) Z Kolář	6	6^{5}	[6]
