= 2024 Argentina Open – Doubles =

Doubles
- 2024 Argentina Open

Final
- Champions: (Italy) Simone Bolelli (Italy) Andrea Vavassori
- Runners-up: (Spain) Marcel Granollers (Argentina) Horacio Zeballos
- Score: 6–2, 7–6^{(8–6)}

Events
Singles	Doubles
← 2023 ·	Argentina Open	· 2025 →

Simone Bolelli and Andrea Vavassori won the doubles title at the 2024 Argentina Open, defeating Marcel Granollers and Horacio Zeballos in the final, 6–2, 7–6^{(8–6)}.

Bolelli and Fabio Fognini were the reigning champions, but Fognini did not participate this year.

== Seeds ==
1. (Spain) Marcel Granollers / (Argentina) Horacio Zeballos (final)
2. (Argentina) Máximo González / (Argentina) Andrés Molteni (first round)
3. (Italy) Simone Bolelli / (Italy) Andrea Vavassori (champions)
4. (Brazil) Marcelo Melo / (Netherlands) Matwé Middelkoop (semifinals)

== Draw ==
=== Key ===
- Q = Qualifier
- WC = Wild card
- LL = Lucky loser
- Alt = Alternate
- ITF = ITF entry
- PR = Protected ranking
- SR = Special ranking
- SE = Special exempt
- JE = Junior exempt
- JR = Junior Accelerator Programme entrant
- CO = College Accelerator Programme entrant
- NG = Next Gen Accelerator Program entrant
- w/o = Walkover
- r = Retired
- d = Defaulted

=== Draw ===
First round
1	(Spain) M Granollers (Argentina) H Zeballos	6	6^{4}	[10]
(France) T Arribagé (France) F Reboul	4	7^{7}	[3]
(Colombia) DE Galán (Spain) B Zapata Miralles	2	6	[3]
(Germany) Y Hanfmann (Peru) JP Varillas	6	4	[10]
4	(Brazil) M Melo (Netherlands) M Middelkoop	6	6
(Austria) S Ofner (Italy) A Pellegrino	0	3
(Argentina) S Báez (Brazil) T Seyboth Wild	6^{3}	6	[10]
(Romania) VV Cornea (Austria) P Oswald	7^{7}	4	[7]
(Argentina) G Durán (Argentina) TM Etcheverry	6	5	[10]
WC	(Argentina) M Navone (Argentina) GA Olivieri	3	7	[5]
(Chile) T Barrios Vera (Chile) A Tabilo	4	6^{8}
3	(Italy) S Bolelli (Italy) A Vavassori	6	7^{10}
(Spain) R Carballés Baena (Spain) J Munar	6	6
WC	(Argentina) F Bagnis (Argentina) F Delbonis	4	2
(Colombia) N Barrientos (Brazil) R Matos	1	6	[10]
2	(Argentina) M González (Argentina) A Molteni	6	3	[8]

Quarterfinals
1	(Spain) M Granollers (Argentina) H Zeballos	6	6
(Germany) Y Hanfmann (Peru) JP Varillas	1	3
4	(Brazil) M Melo (Netherlands) M Middelkoop	6	6
(Argentina) S Báez (Brazil) T Seyboth Wild	4	3
(Argentina) G Durán (Argentina) TM Etcheverry	7^{8}	2	[6]
3	(Italy) S Bolelli (Italy) A Vavassori	6^{6}	6	[10]
(Spain) R Carballés Baena (Spain) J Munar	1	1
(Colombia) N Barrientos (Brazil) R Matos	6	6

Semifinals
1	(Spain) M Granollers (Argentina) H Zeballos	6	6
4	(Brazil) M Melo (Netherlands) M Middelkoop	3	3
3	(Italy) S Bolelli (Italy) A Vavassori	7	6
(Colombia) N Barrientos (Brazil) R Matos	5	3

Final
1	(Spain) M Granollers (Argentina) H Zeballos	2	6^{6}
3	(Italy) S Bolelli (Italy) A Vavassori	6	7^{8}
