= 2026 Argentina Open – Doubles =

Doubles
- 2026 Argentina Open

Final
- Champions: (Brazil) Orlando Luz (Brazil) Rafael Matos
- Runners-up: (Argentina) Andrea Collarini (Argentina) Nicolás Kicker
- Score: 7–5, 6–3

Events
Singles	Doubles
- Argentina Open

Orlando Luz and Rafael Matos defeated Andrea Collarini and Nicolás Kicker in the final, 7–5, 6–3 to win the doubles tennis title at the 2026 Argentina Open. It was Luz' second ATP Tour doubles title and Matos' twelfth, and Matos improved his runner-up result from the previous edition.

Guido Andreozzi and Théo Arribagé were the reigning champions, but Arribagé chose to compete in Dallas instead. Andreozzi partnered Manuel Guinard, but lost in the semifinals to Luz and Matos.

== Seeds ==
1. (Argentina) Máximo González / (Argentina) Andrés Molteni (semifinals)
2. (Argentina) Guido Andreozzi / (France) Manuel Guinard (semifinals)
3. (Brazil) Orlando Luz / (Brazil) Rafael Matos (champions)
4. (Brazil) Marcelo Demoliner / (Brazil) Fernando Romboli (quarterfinals)

== Draw ==
Key

- Q = Qualifier
- WC = Wild card
- LL = Lucky loser
- Alt = Alternate
- ITF = ITF entry
- PR = Protected ranking
- SR = Special ranking
- SE = Special exempt
- JE = Junior exempt
- JR = Junior Accelerator Programme entrant
- CO = College Accelerator Programme entrant
- NG = Next Gen Accelerator Program entrant
- w/o = Walkover
- r = Retired
- d = Defaulted

=== Draw ===
First round
1	(Argentina) M González (Argentina) A Molteni	6^{5}	6	[14]
WC	(Argentina) JM Cerúndolo (Argentina) M Kestelboim	7^{7}	4	[12]
(Peru) I Buse (Spain) Í Cervantes	2	5
(Ecuador) G Escobar (Mexico) MÁ Reyes-Varela	6	7
4	(Brazil) M Demoliner (Brazil) F Romboli	7^{7}	6
Alt	(Argentina) L Midón (Argentina) G Villanueva	6^{5}	2
Alt	(Ecuador) Á Guillén Meza (Argentina) GA Olivieri	5	4
Alt	(Argentina) A Collarini (Argentina) N Kicker	7	6
Alt	(Peru) G Bueno (Peru) C Huertas del Pino	7^{7}	1	[4]
(New Zealand) F Reynolds (New Zealand) J Watt	6^{4}	6	[10]
(Brazil) M Melo (Netherlands) J-J Rojer	2	6	[4]
3	(Brazil) O Luz (Brazil) R Matos	6	3	[10]
WC	(Argentina) S Báez (Argentina) JB Torres	3	6	[4]
(Colombia) N Barrientos (United States) E Nava	6	3	[10]
(Spain) P Martínez (Chile) A Tabilo	6^{4}	6	[8]
2	(Argentina) G Andreozzi (France) M Guinard	7^{7}	3	[10]

Quarterfinals
1	(Argentina) M González (Argentina) A Molteni	6	6
(Ecuador) G Escobar (Mexico) MÁ Reyes-Varela	4	4
4	(Brazil) M Demoliner (Brazil) F Romboli	3	4
Alt	(Argentina) A Collarini (Argentina) N Kicker	6	6
(New Zealand) F Reynolds (New Zealand) J Watt	6	5	[7]
3	(Brazil) O Luz (Brazil) R Matos	3	7	[10]
(Colombia) N Barrientos (United States) E Nava	4	2
2	(Argentina) G Andreozzi (France) M Guinard	6	6

Semifinals
1	(Argentina) M González (Argentina) A Molteni	6	3	[5]
Alt	(Argentina) A Collarini (Argentina) N Kicker	1	6	[10]
3	(Brazil) O Luz (Brazil) R Matos	6^{4}	7^{7}	[10]
2	(Argentina) G Andreozzi (France) M Guinard	7^{7}	6^{5}	[6]

Final
Alt	(Argentina) A Collarini (Argentina) N Kicker	5	3
3	(Brazil) O Luz (Brazil) R Matos	7	6
