= 2024 Argentina Open =

- Date: 12–18 February
- Edition: 27th
- Category: ATP Tour 250 series
- Draw: 28S / 16D
- Prize money: $642,615
- Surface: Clay / outdoor
- Location: Buenos Aires, Argentina
- Venue: Buenos Aires Lawn Tennis Club

Champions

Singles
- (Argentina) Facundo Díaz Acosta

Doubles
- (Italy) Simone Bolelli / (Italy) Andrea Vavassori
← 2023 ·	ATP Buenos Aires	· 2025 →

The 2024 IEB+ Argentina Open was a men's tennis tournament played on outdoor clay courts. It was the 27th edition of the ATP Buenos Aires event, and part of the ATP Tour 250 series of the 2024 ATP Tour. It took place in Buenos Aires, Argentina, from 12 to 18 February 2024.

== Finals ==
=== Singles ===
- (Argentina) Facundo Díaz Acosta def. (Chile) Nicolás Jarry, 6–3, 6–4

=== Doubles ===
- (Italy) Simone Bolelli / (Italy) Andrea Vavassori def. (Spain) Marcel Granollers / (Argentina) Horacio Zeballos, 6–2, 7–6^{(8–6)}

== Singles main draw entrants ==
=== Seeds ===
Country	Player	Rank^{1}	Seed
ESP	Carlos Alcaraz	2	1
GBR	Cameron Norrie	19	2
CHI	Nicolás Jarry	20	3
ARG	Francisco Cerúndolo	22	4
ARG	Sebastián Báez	26	5
ARG	Tomás Martín Etcheverry	29	6
SRB	Laslo Djere	35	7
FRA	Arthur Fils	36	8

- ^{1} Rankings are as of 5 February 2024.

=== Other entrants ===
The following players received wildcards into the singles main draw:

- (Croatia) Marin Čilić
- (Argentina) Facundo Díaz Acosta
- (Argentina) Diego Schwartzman

The following players received entry as special exempts:

- (Argentina) Federico Coria
- (Italy) Luciano Darderi

The following players received entry from the qualifying draw:

- (Colombia) Daniel Elahi Galán
- (Argentina) Mariano Navone
- (Argentina) Camilo Ugo Carabelli
- (Italy) Andrea Vavassori

== Doubles main draw entrants ==
=== Seeds ===
Country	Player	Country	Player	Rank^{1}	Seed
ESP	Marcel Granollers	ARG	Horacio Zeballos	23	1
ARG	Máximo González	ARG	Andrés Molteni	26	2
ITA	Simone Bolelli	ITA	Andrea Vavassori	55	3
BRA	Marcelo Melo	NED	Matwé Middelkoop	94	4

- ^{1} Rankings as of 5 February 2024.

=== Other entrants ===
The following pairs received wildcards into the doubles main draw:

- (Argentina) Facundo Bagnis / (Argentina) Federico Delbonis
- (Argentina) Mariano Navone / (Argentina) Genaro Alberto Olivieri

=== Withdrawals ===
- (France) Sadio Doumbia / (France) Fabien Reboul → replaced by (France) Théo Arribagé / (France) Fabien Reboul
