= 2021 Aspria Tennis Cup – Singles =

Singles
- 2021 Aspria Tennis Cup

Final
- Champion: (Italy) Gian Marco Moroni
- Runner-up: (Argentina) Federico Coria
- Score: 6–3, 6–2

Events
Singles	Doubles
← 2019 ·	Aspria Tennis Cup	· 2022 →

Hugo Dellien was the defending champion but chose not to defend his title.

Gian Marco Moroni won the title after defeating Federico Coria 6–3, 6–2 in the final.

== Seeds ==
1. (Argentina) Federico Coria (final)
2. (Denmark) Holger Rune (semifinals)
3. (United States) Ulises Blanch (second round)
4. (Argentina) Facundo Mena (first round, retired)
5. (Portugal) Gastão Elias (quarterfinals)
6. (France) Tristan Lamasine (second round)
7. (Russia) Teymuraz Gabashvili (first round)
8. (Italy) Gian Marco Moroni (champion)

== Draw ==
=== Key ===
- Q = Qualifier
- WC = Wild card
- LL = Lucky loser
- Alt = Alternate
- SE = Special exempt
- PR = Protected ranking
- ITF = ITF entry
- JE = Junior exempt
- w/o = Walkover
- r = Retired
- d = Defaulted
- SR = Special ranking

=== Finals ===
Semifinals
1	(Argentina) Federico Coria	6	6
(France) Hugo Grenier	4	3
8/WC	(Italy) Gian Marco Moroni	7^{7}	6
2	(Denmark) Holger Rune	6^{4}	1

Final
1	(Argentina) Federico Coria	3	2
8/WC	(Italy) Gian Marco Moroni	6	6

=== Top half ===
First round
1	(Argentina) F Coria	6	6
(Italy) R Bonadio	2	2
(Bosnia and Herzegovina) M Bašić	6	7
(Czech Republic) V Kopřiva	3	5
(Czech Republic) J Lehečka	6	7^{7}
WC	(Italy) L Vanni	3	6^{5}
Q	(Czech Republic) J Forejtek	4	2
5	(Portugal) G Elias	6	6
4	(Argentina) F Mena	0	0^{r}
(Serbia) P Krstin	6	3
SE	(France) M Guinard	4	7^{9}	5
(Spain) A Menéndez Maceiras	6	6^{7}	1^{r}
(France) H Grenier	6	6
(Russia) A Vatutin	3	2
Q	(Italy) G Zeppieri	6	7^{7}
7	(Russia) T Gabashvili	1	6^{4}

Second round
1	(Argentina) F Coria	7^{10}	6
(Bosnia and Herzegovina) M Bašić	6^{8}	3
(Czech Republic) J Lehečka	2	4
5	(Portugal) G Elias	6	6
(Serbia) P Krstin	6	0	6
SE	(France) M Guinard	4	6	4
(France) H Grenier	3	6	7^{7}
Q	(Italy) G Zeppieri	6	3	6^{5}

Quarterfinals
1	(Argentina) F Coria	6	6
5	(Portugal) G Elias	2	0
(Serbia) P Krstin	4	4
(France) H Grenier	6	6

Semifinals
1	(Argentina) F Coria	6	6
(France) H Grenier	4	3

=== Bottom half ===
First round
8/WC	(Italy) GM Moroni	6	6
PR	(Croatia) V Galović	2	3
Q	(Brazil) O Luz	7^{7}	4	7
Alt	(Croatia) N Serdarušić	6^{5}	6	5
(Germany) J Lenz	1	2
Q	(Croatia) D Ajduković	6	6
(Spain) G García López	6	3	2
3	(United States) U Blanch	3	6	6
6	(France) T Lamasine	3	6	7
(Italy) A Arnaboldi	6	1	5
WC	(Italy) R Brancaccio	5	3
(Argentina) P Cachin	7	6
(Morocco) E Benchetrit	4	1
(Tunisia) M Jaziri	6	6
(Chinese Taipei) T-l Wu	6^{4}	5
2	(Denmark) H Rune	7^{7}	7

Second round
8/WC	(Italy) GM Moroni	6	6
Q	(Brazil) O Luz	3	4
Q	(Croatia) D Ajduković	6	6
3	(United States) U Blanch	3	1
6	(France) T Lamasine	1	4
(Argentina) P Cachin	6	6
(Tunisia) M Jaziri	3	1
2	(Denmark) H Rune	6	6

Quarterfinals
8/WC	(Italy) GM Moroni	6	7
Q	(Croatia) D Ajduković	3	5
(Argentina) P Cachin	6	6^{3}	6^{8}
2	(Denmark) H Rune	0	7^{7}	7^{10}

Semifinals
8/WC	(Italy) GM Moroni	7^{7}	6
2	(Denmark) H Rune	6^{4}	1
