= 2021 Aspria Tennis Cup =

- Date: 21–27 June
- Edition: 15th
- Surface: Clay
- Location: Milan, Italy

Champions

Singles
- (Italy) Gian Marco Moroni

Doubles
- (Czech Republic) Vít Kopřiva / (Czech Republic) Jiří Lehečka
← 2019 ·	Aspria Tennis Cup	· 2022 →

The 2021 Aspria Tennis Cup was a professional tennis tournament played on clay courts. It was the fifteenth edition of the tournament which was part of the 2021 ATP Challenger Tour. It took place in Milan, Italy between 21 and 27 June 2021.

== Singles main-draw entrants ==
=== Seeds ===
Country	Player	Rank^{1}	Seed
ARG	Federico Coria	103	1
DEN	Holger Rune	231	2
USA	Ulises Blanch	247	3
ARG	Facundo Mena	249	4
POR	Gastão Elias	250	5
FRA	Tristan Lamasine	252	6
RUS	Teymuraz Gabashvili	256	7
ITA	Gian Marco Moroni	260	8

- ^{1} Rankings are as of 14 June 2021.

=== Other entrants ===
The following players received wildcards into the singles main draw:

- (Italy) Raúl Brancaccio
- (Italy) Gian Marco Moroni
- (Italy) Luca Vanni

The following player received entry into the singles main draw as a special exempt:

- (France) Manuel Guinard

The following player received entry into the singles main draw using a protected ranking:

- (Croatia) Viktor Galović

The following player received entry into the singles main draw as an alternate:

- (Croatia) Nino Serdarušić

The following players received entry from the qualifying draw:

- (Croatia) Duje Ajduković
- (Czech Republic) Jonáš Forejtek
- (Brazil) Orlando Luz
- (Italy) Giulio Zeppieri

== Champions ==
=== Singles ===
- (Italy) Gian Marco Moroni def. (Argentina) Federico Coria 6–3, 6–2.

=== Doubles ===
- (Czech Republic) Vít Kopřiva / (Czech Republic) Jiří Lehečka def. (Germany) Dustin Brown / (Austria) Tristan-Samuel Weissborn 6–4, 6–0.
