= 2023 Szczecin Open – Doubles =

Doubles
- 2023 Szczecin Open

Final
- Champions: (Czech Republic) Andrew Paulson (Ukraine) Vitaliy Sachko
- Runners-up: (Czech Republic) Zdeněk Kolář (Spain) Sergio Martos Gornés
- Score: 6–1, 7–6^{(8–6)}

Events
Singles	Doubles
- Szczecin Open

Dustin Brown and Andrea Vavassori were the defending champions but chose not to defend their title.

Andrew Paulson and Vitaliy Sachko won the title after defeating Zdeněk Kolář and Sergio Martos Gornés 6–1, 7–6^{(8–6)} in the final.

== Seeds ==
1. (Ukraine) Denys Molchanov / (Spain) David Vega Hernández (semifinals)
2. (United States) Evan King / (United States) Reese Stalder (semifinals)
3. (Germany) Constantin Frantzen / (Germany) Hendrik Jebens (first round)
4. (India) Anirudh Chandrasekar / (India) Vijay Sundar Prashanth (first round)

== Draw ==
Key

- Q = Qualifier
- WC = Wild card
- LL = Lucky loser
- Alt = Alternate
- ITF = ITF entry
- PR = Protected ranking
- SR = Special ranking
- SE = Special exempt
- JE = Junior exempt
- JR = Junior Accelerator Programme entrant
- CO = College Accelerator Programme entrant
- NG = Next Gen Accelerator Program entrant
- w/o = Walkover
- r = Retired
- d = Defaulted

First round
1	(Ukraine) D Molchanov (Spain) D Vega Hernández	7^{8}	6
(Spain) Í Cervantes (Spain) O Roca Batalla	6^{6}	4
Alt	(Poland) P Matuszewski (Germany) K Wehnelt	3	6	[8]
WC	(Poland) M Kaśnikowski (Poland) Ł Kubot	6	3	[10]
3	(Germany) C Frantzen (Germany) H Jebens	6	4	[10]
(Czech Republic) A Paulson (Ukraine) V Sachko	3	6	[12]
I Liutarevich (Ukraine) V Manafov	6^{4}	7^{9}	[10]
(Italy) M Bortolotti (Italy) F Cobolli	7^{7}	6^{7}	[6]
WC	(United Kingdom) J Choinski (Poland) S Kielan	6^{4}	4
(Czech Republic) Z Kolář (Spain) S Martos Gornés	7^{7}	6
(Czech Republic) R Jebavý (Czech Republic) P Nouza	7	4	[14]
4	(India) A Chandrasekar (India) VS Prashanth	5	6	[12]
(Italy) A Pellegrino (Colombia) C Rodríguez	2	2
(Serbia) I Sabanov (Serbia) M Sabanov	6	6
(Austria) N Oberleitner (Austria) P Oswald	2	5
2	(United States) E King (United States) R Stalder	6	7

Quarterfinals
1	(Ukraine) D Molchanov (Spain) D Vega Hernández	4	6	[10]
WC	(Poland) M Kaśnikowski (Poland) Ł Kubot	6	2	[7]
(Czech Republic) A Paulson (Ukraine) V Sachko	6	6
I Liutarevich (Ukraine) V Manafov	4	4
(Czech Republic) Z Kolář (Spain) S Martos Gornés	6	6
(Czech Republic) R Jebavý (Czech Republic) P Nouza	3	4
(Serbia) I Sabanov (Serbia) M Sabanov	1	7^{7}	[7]
2	(United States) E King (United States) R Stalder	6	6^{5}	[10]

Semifinals
1	(Ukraine) D Molchanov (Spain) D Vega Hernández	4	3
(Czech Republic) A Paulson (Ukraine) V Sachko	6	6
(Czech Republic) Z Kolář (Spain) S Martos Gornés	6	7
2	(United States) E King (United States) R Stalder	0	5

Final
(Czech Republic) A Paulson (Ukraine) V Sachko	6	7^{8}
(Czech Republic) Z Kolář (Spain) S Martos Gornés	1	6^{6}
