= 2023 Szczecin Open – Singles =

Singles
- 2023 Szczecin Open

Final
- Champion: (Argentina) Federico Coria
- Runner-up: (Czech Republic) Vít Kopřiva
- Score: 6–1, 7–6^{(7–4)}

Events
Singles	Doubles
- Szczecin Open

Corentin Moutet was the defending champion but chose not to defend his title.

Federico Coria won the title after defeating Vít Kopřiva 6–1, 7–6^{(7–4)} in the final.

== Seeds ==
1. (Spain) Roberto Carballés Baena (withdrew)
2. (Argentina) Pedro Cachin (quarterfinals)
3. (Spain) Jaume Munar (quarterfinals)
4. Alexander Shevchenko (semifinals, retired)
5. (Argentina) Federico Coria (champion)
6. (Argentina) Facundo Díaz Acosta (first round)
7. (France) Hugo Gaston (second round)
8. (Italy) Marco Cecchinato (first round)
9. (United Kingdom) Jan Choinski (first round)

== Draw ==
Key

- Q = Qualifier
- WC = Wild card
- LL = Lucky loser
- Alt = Alternate
- ITF = ITF entry
- PR = Protected ranking
- SR = Special ranking
- SE = Special exempt
- JE = Junior exempt
- JR = Junior Accelerator Programme entrant
- CO = College Accelerator Programme entrant
- NG = Next Gen Accelerator Program entrant
- w/o = Walkover
- r = Retired
- d = Defaulted

=== Finals ===
Semifinals
(Czech Republic) Vít Kopřiva	6	1
4	Alexander Shevchenko	0	0^{r}
5	(Argentina) Federico Coria	6	6
Alt	(Italy) Francesco Maestrelli	4	2

Final
(Czech Republic) Vít Kopřiva	1	6^{4}
5	(Argentina) Federico Coria	6	7^{7}

=== Top half ===
First round
9	(United Kingdom) J Choinski	2	3
(Czech Republic) V Kopřiva	6	6
(Spain) P Martínez	6^{2}	6	3
Q	(Spain) O Roca Batalla	7^{7}	1	6
Q	(Czech Republic) P Nouza	7^{7}	4	4
(Italy) F Cobolli	6^{3}	6	6
Alt	(Austria) L Neumayer	5	6	6
6	(Argentina) F Díaz Acosta	7	4	2
4	A Shevchenko	6	4	7^{7}
(Ukraine) V Sachko	2	6	6^{3}
(Italy) R Brancaccio	6	7
Alt	(France) G Blancaneaux	4	5
(Bulgaria) A Andreev	6	6^{4}	6
WC	(Poland) D Michalski	1	7^{7}	4
(Czech Republic) Z Kolář	5	2
7	(France) H Gaston	7	6

Second round
(Czech Republic) V Kopřiva	7^{7}	7^{7}
Q	(Spain) O Roca Batalla	6^{5}	6^{5}
(Italy) F Cobolli	6	1	7^{7}
Alt	(Austria) L Neumayer	3	6	6^{4}
4	A Shevchenko	5	7	7^{10}
(Italy) R Brancaccio	7	5	6^{8}
(Bulgaria) A Andreev	2	7	6
7	(France) H Gaston	6	5	4

Quarterfinals
(Czech Republic) V Kopřiva	6	5	6
(Italy) F Cobolli	1	7	0
4	A Shevchenko	6	5	7
(Bulgaria) A Andreev	3	7	5

Semifinals
(Czech Republic) V Kopřiva	6	1
4	A Shevchenko	0	0^{r}

=== Bottom half ===
First round
5	(Argentina) F Coria	6	2	6
Q	(Germany) H Squire	4	6	4
Q	(Germany) Lucas Gerch	7^{7}	4	6
Q	(Czech Republic) A Paulson	6^{3}	6	4
(Netherlands) J Sels	1	0^{r}
WC	(Poland) M Kaśnikowski	6	0
Q	(Germany) R Molleker	1	3
3	(Spain) J Munar	6	6
8	(Italy) M Cecchinato	5	3
Alt	(Italy) F Maestrelli	7	6
WC	(Belgium) G-A Bailly	7	6
(Czech Republic) D Svrčina	5	2
Alt	(Italy) A Pellegrino	6^{1}	6^{7}
(Slovakia) J Kovalík	7^{7}	7^{9}
Alt	(Spain) D Rincón	2	4
2	(Argentina) P Cachin	6	6

Second round
5	(Argentina) F Coria	3	6	6
Q	(Germany) L Gerch	6	4	3
WC	(Poland) M Kaśnikowski	4	3
3	(Spain) J Munar	6	6
Alt	(Italy) F Maestrelli	6	5	6
WC	(Belgium) G-A Bailly	3	7	1
(Slovakia) J Kovalík	0	3
2	(Argentina) P Cachin	6	6

Quarterfinals
5	(Argentina) F Coria	6	6
3	(Spain) J Munar	3	3
Alt	(Italy) F Maestrelli	3	6	7^{9}
2	(Argentina) P Cachin	6	1	6^{7}

Semifinals
5	(Argentina) F Coria	6	6
Alt	(Italy) F Maestrelli	4	2
