= 2021 Moneta Czech Open =

- Date: 14–20 June
- Edition: 28th
- Draw: 32S / 16D
- Surface: Clay
- Location: Prostějov, Czech Republic
- Venue: TK Agrofert Prostějov

Champions

Singles
- (Argentina) Federico Coria

Doubles
- (Kazakhstan) Aleksandr Nedovyesov / (Portugal) Gonçalo Oliveira
- Moneta Czech Open

The 2021 Moneta Czech Open was a professional tennis tournament played on clay courts. It was the 28th edition of the tournament which was part of the 2021 ATP Challenger Tour. It took place in Prostějov, Czech Republic between 14 and 20 June 2021.

== Singles main-draw entrants ==
=== Seeds ===
Country	Player	Rank^{1}	Seed
ESP	Pablo Andújar	68	1
CZE	Jiří Veselý	71	2
ITA	Gianluca Mager	87	3
ARG	Federico Coria	94	4
BOL	Hugo Dellien	124	5
SVK	Jozef Kovalík	127	6
ARG	Juan Manuel Cerúndolo	147	7
SLO	Blaž Rola	155	8

- ^{1} Rankings are as of 31 May 2021.

=== Other entrants ===
The following players received wildcards into the singles main draw:

- (Czech Republic) Andrew Paulson
- (Czech Republic) Daniel Siniakov
- (Czech Republic) Dalibor Svrčina

The following player received entry into the singles main draw using a protected ranking:

- (Russia) Andrey Kuznetsov

The following player received entry into the singles main draw as an alternate:

- (Czech Republic) Jonáš Forejtek

The following players received entry from the qualifying draw:

- (Austria) Alexander Erler
- (Tunisia) Skander Mansouri
- (Czech Republic) David Poljak
- (United States) Alex Rybakov

The following players received entry as lucky losers:

- (Germany) Johannes Härteis
- (Netherlands) Jelle Sels

== Champions ==
=== Singles ===
- (Argentina) Federico Coria def. (Slovakia) Alex Molčan 7–6^{(7–1)}, 6–3.

=== Doubles ===
- (Kazakhstan) Aleksandr Nedovyesov / (Portugal) Gonçalo Oliveira def. (Czech Republic) Roman Jebavý / (Czech Republic) Zdeněk Kolář 1–6, 7–6^{(7–5)}, [10–6].
