= 2023 Szczecin Open =

- Date: 11–17 September
- Edition: 30th
- Surface: Clay
- Location: Szczecin, Poland

Champions

Singles
- (Argentina) Federico Coria

Doubles
- (Czech Republic) Andrew Paulson / (Ukraine) Vitaliy Sachko
- Szczecin Open

The 2023 Invest in Szczecin Open was a professional tennis tournament played on clay courts. It was the 30th edition of the tournament, and was part of the 2023 ATP Challenger Tour. It took place in Szczecin, Poland between 11 and 17 September 2023.

== Singles main-draw entrants ==
=== Seeds ===
Country	Player	Rank^{1}	Seed
~~ESP~~	~~Roberto Carballés Baena~~	~~63~~	~~1~~
ARG	Pedro Cachin	66	2
ESP	Jaume Munar	82	3
	Alexander Shevchenko	83	4
ARG	Federico Coria	91	5
ARG	Facundo Díaz Acosta	94	6
FRA	Hugo Gaston	99	7
ITA	Marco Cecchinato	109	8
GBR	Jan Choinski	126	9

^{1} Rankings are as of 28 August 2023.

=== Other entrants ===
The following players received wildcards into the singles main draw:

- (Belgium) Gilles-Arnaud Bailly
- (Poland) Maks Kaśnikowski
- (Poland) Daniel Michalski

The following players received entry into the singles main draw as alternates:

- (France) Geoffrey Blancaneaux
- (Italy) Francesco Maestrelli
- (Austria) Lukas Neumayer
- (Italy) Andrea Pellegrino
- (Spain) Daniel Rincón

The following players received entry from the qualifying draw:

- (Germany) Lucas Gerch
- (Germany) Rudolf Molleker
- (Czech Republic) Petr Nouza
- (Czech Republic) Andrew Paulson
- (Spain) Oriol Roca Batalla
- (Germany) Henri Squire

== Champions ==
=== Singles ===
- (Argentina) Federico Coria def. (Czech Republic) Vít Kopřiva 6–1, 7–6^{(7–4)}.

=== Doubles ===
- (Czech Republic) Andrew Paulson / (Ukraine) Vitaliy Sachko def. (Czech Republic) Zdeněk Kolář / (Spain) Sergio Martos Gornés 6–1, 7–6^{(8–6)}.
