= 2023 Argentina Open =

- Date: 13–19 February
- Edition: 26th
- Category: ATP Tour 250 series
- Draw: 28S / 16D
- Prize money: $711,600
- Surface: Clay / outdoor
- Location: Buenos Aires, Argentina
- Venue: Buenos Aires Lawn Tennis Club

Champions

Singles
- (Spain) Carlos Alcaraz

Doubles
- (Italy) Simone Bolelli / (Italy) Fabio Fognini
- ATP Buenos Aires

The 2023 Argentina Open was a men's tennis tournament played on outdoor clay courts. It was the 26th edition of the ATP Buenos Aires event, and part of the ATP Tour 250 series of the 2023 ATP Tour. It took place in Buenos Aires, Argentina, from 13 to 19 February 2023.

== Finals ==
=== Singles ===
- (Spain) Carlos Alcaraz def. (United Kingdom) Cameron Norrie, 6–3, 7–5
- It was Alcaraz's 1st title of the year and the 7th of his career.

=== Doubles ===
- (Italy) Simone Bolelli / (Italy) Fabio Fognini def. (Colombia) Nicolás Barrientos / (Uruguay) Ariel Behar, 6–2, 6–4

== Points and prize money ==
=== Point distribution ===
Event	W	F	SF	QF	Round of 16	Round of 32	Q	Q2	Q1
Singles	250	150	90	45	20	0	12	6	0
Doubles	250	150	90	45	0	—N/a	—N/a	—N/a	—N/a

=== Prize money ===
Event	W	F	SF	QF	Round of 16	Round of 32	Q2	Q1
Singles	$95,305	$55,595	$32,680	$18,940	$11,000	$6,720	$3,360	$1,830
Doubles*	$33,110	$17,720	$10,400	$5,800	$3,420	—N/a	—N/a	—N/a
Doubles prize money per team

== Singles main draw entrants ==
=== Seeds ===
Country	Player	Rank^{1}	Seed
ESP	Carlos Alcaraz	2	1
GBR	Cameron Norrie	11	2
ITA	Lorenzo Musetti	19	3
ARG	Diego Schwartzman	28	4
ARG	Francisco Cerúndolo	31	5
ARG	Sebastián Báez	47	6
SVK	Alex Molčan	52	7
ESP	Albert Ramos Viñolas	54	8

- ^{1} Rankings are as of 6 February 2023.

=== Other entrants ===
The following players received wildcards into the singles main draw:

- (Argentina) Facundo Díaz Acosta
- (Argentina) Guido Pella
- (Austria) Dominic Thiem

The following player received entry using a protected ranking into the singles main draw:

- (Bolivia) Hugo Dellien

The following players received entry from the qualifying draw:

- (Germany) Yannick Hanfmann
- (Serbia) Dušan Lajović
- (Argentina) Camilo Ugo Carabelli
- (Peru) Juan Pablo Varillas

=== Withdrawals ===
- (France) Corentin Moutet → replaced by (Brazil) Thiago Monteiro

== Doubles main draw entrants ==
=== Seeds ===
Country	Player	Country	Player	Rank^{1}	Seed
~~ESP~~	~~Marcel Granollers~~	~~ARG~~	~~Horacio Zeballos~~	~~27~~	~~1~~
BRA	Rafael Matos	ESP	David Vega Hernández	56	2
ITA	Simone Bolelli	ITA	Fabio Fognini	61	3
ARG	Máximo González	ARG	Andrés Molteni	87	4

- ^{1} Rankings as of 6 February 2023.

=== Other entrants ===
The following pairs received wildcards into the doubles main draw:

- ~~(Argentina) Federico Coria~~ / ~~(Argentina) Tomás Martín Etcheverry~~
- (Argentina) Diego Schwartzman / (Austria) Dominic Thiem

=== Withdrawals ===
- (Argentina) Federico Coria / (Argentina) Tomás Martín Etcheverry → replaced by (Bolivia) Boris Arias / (Bolivia) Federico Zeballos
- (Spain) Marcel Granollers / (Argentina) Horacio Zeballos
