= 2019 Savannah Challenger – Doubles =

Doubles
- 2019 Savannah Challenger

Final
- Champions: (Venezuela) Roberto Maytín (Brazil) Fernando Romboli
- Runners-up: (France) Manuel Guinard (France) Arthur Rinderknech
- Score: 6–7^{(5–7)}, 6–4, [11–9]

Events
Singles	Doubles
- Savannah Challenger

Luke Bambridge and Akira Santillan were the defending champions but chose not to defend their title.

Roberto Maytín and Fernando Romboli won the title after defeating Manuel Guinard and Arthur Rinderknech 6–7^{(5–7)}, 6–4, [11–9] in the final.

== Seeds ==
1. (United States) Robert Galloway / (United States) Nathaniel Lammons (first round)
2. (Venezuela) Roberto Maytín / (Brazil) Fernando Romboli (champions)
3. (United States) Alex Lawson / (South Africa) Ruan Roelofse (semifinals)
4. (United States) Dennis Novikov / (Sweden) Andreas Siljeström (quarterfinals)

== Draw ==
Key

- Q = Qualifier
- WC = Wild card
- LL = Lucky loser
- Alt = Alternate
- ITF = ITF entry
- PR = Protected ranking
- SR = Special ranking
- SE = Special exempt
- JE = Junior exempt
- JR = Junior Accelerator Programme entrant
- CO = College Accelerator Programme entrant
- NG = Next Gen Accelerator Program entrant
- w/o = Walkover
- r = Retired
- d = Defaulted

First round
1	(United States) R Galloway (United States) N Lammons	6	3	[11]
ITF	(France) M Guinard (France) A Rinderknech	3	6	[13]
(United States) C Altamirano (United States) T-S Kwiatkowski	6	6
ITF	(Argentina) C Ugo Carabelli (Kazakhstan) D Yevseyev	1	2
4	(United States) D Novikov (Sweden) A Siljeström	6	6
(United States) JP Fruttero (Peru) S Galdós	3	4
Alt	(Germany) J Härteis (Germany) B Hassan	6^{8}	4
(Ecuador) E Gómez (United States) J Withrow	7^{10}	6
WC	(United States) JC Aragone (Philippines) T Huey	7	6
(Chile) MT Barrios Vera (United States) U Blanch	5	3
(Uruguay) M Cuevas (Peru) JP Varillas	4	6^{0}
3	(United States) A Lawson (South Africa) R Roelofse	6	7^{7}
WC	(United States) H Johnson (United States) Y Johnson	w/o
(Germany) M Moraing (Croatia) N Serdarušić
WC	(United States) Ian Dempster (United States) A Reed	4	4
2	(Venezuela) R Maytín (Brazil) F Romboli	6	6

Quarterfinals
ITF	(France) M Guinard (France) A Rinderknech	w/o
(United States) C Altamirano (United States) T-S Kwiatkowski
4	(United States) D Novikov (Sweden) A Siljeström	7	6^{6}	[7]
(Ecuador) E Gómez (United States) J Withrow	5	7^{8}	[10]
WC	(United States) JC Aragone (Philippines) T Huey	6	4	[7]
3	(United States) A Lawson (South Africa) R Roelofse	3	6	[10]
WC	(United States) H Johnson (United States) Y Johnson	3	3
2	(Venezuela) R Maytín (Brazil) F Romboli	6	6

Semifinals
ITF	(France) M Guinard (France) A Rinderknech	7^{7}	7^{7}
(Ecuador) E Gómez (United States) J Withrow	6^{2}	6^{5}
3	(United States) A Lawson (South Africa) R Roelofse	6^{6}	3
2	(Venezuela) R Maytín (Brazil) F Romboli	7^{8}	6

Final
ITF	(France) M Guinard (France) A Rinderknech	7^{7}	4	[9]
2	(Venezuela) R Maytín (Brazil) F Romboli	6^{5}	6	[11]
