= 2021 Aspria Tennis Cup – Doubles =

Doubles
- 2021 Aspria Tennis Cup

Final
- Champions: (Czech Republic) Vít Kopřiva (Czech Republic) Jiří Lehečka
- Runners-up: (Germany) Dustin Brown (Austria) Tristan-Samuel Weissborn
- Score: 6–4, 6–0

Events
Singles	Doubles
← 2019 ·	Aspria Tennis Cup	· 2022 →

Tomislav Brkić and Ante Pavić were the defending champions but chose not to defend their title.

Vít Kopřiva and Jiří Lehečka won the title after defeating Dustin Brown and Tristan-Samuel Weissborn 6–4, 6–0 in the final.

== Seeds ==
1. (Venezuela) Luis David Martínez / (Brazil) Rafael Matos (first round)
2. (United States) Robert Galloway / (United States) Alex Lawson (first round)
3. (United States) Evan King / (United States) Hunter Reese (first round)
4. (France) Sadio Doumbia / (France) Fabien Reboul (semifinals)

== Draw ==
=== Key ===
- Q = Qualifier
- WC = Wild card
- LL = Lucky loser
- Alt = Alternate
- SE = Special exempt
- PR = Protected ranking
- ITF = ITF entry
- JE = Junior exempt
- w/o = Walkover
- r = Retired
- d = Defaulted
- SR = Special ranking

First round
1	(Venezuela) LD Martínez (Brazil) R Matos	6	4	[8]
(Germany) D Brown (Austria) T-S Weissborn	4	6	[10]
(Argentina) G Durán (Portugal) G Elias	6^{1}	5
Alt	(Argentina) P Cachin (Argentina) C Ugo Carabelli	7^{7}	7
3	(United States) E King (United States) H Reese	6^{1}	6^{5}
(Italy) R Bonadio (Russia) T Gabashvili	7^{7}	7^{7}
WC	(Italy) R Brancaccio (Italy) G Zeppieri	6^{3}	4
(Poland) S Walków (Poland) J Zieliński	7^{7}	6
WC	(Italy) F Passaro (Italy) L Vanni	6	6
WC	(Italy) Filippo Carpi (Italy) Leonardo Giuberti	0	2
(Peru) S Galdós (Brazil) O Luz	3	6	[6]
4	(France) S Doumbia (France) F Reboul	6	3	[10]
(Poland) K Drzewiecki (Spain) S Martos Gornés	4	6^{4}
(Brazil) F Romboli (United States) M Schnur	6	7^{7}
(Czech Republic) V Kopřiva (Czech Republic) J Lehečka	6	6
2	(United States) R Galloway (United States) A Lawson	4	3

Quarterfinals
(Germany) D Brown (Austria) T-S Weissborn	6	6
Alt	(Argentina) P Cachin (Argentina) C Ugo Carabelli	4	2
(Italy) R Bonadio (Russia) T Gabashvili	2	1
(Poland) S Walków (Poland) J Zieliński	6	6
WC	(Italy) F Passaro (Italy) L Vanni	1	4
4	(France) S Doumbia (France) F Reboul	6	6
(Brazil) F Romboli (United States) M Schnur	3	7^{7}	[14]
(Czech Republic) V Kopřiva (Czech Republic) J Lehečka	6	6^{1}	[16]

Semifinals
(Germany) D Brown (Austria) T-S Weissborn	7	6
(Poland) S Walków (Poland) J Zieliński	5	4
4	(France) S Doumbia (France) F Reboul	5	3
(Czech Republic) V Kopřiva (Czech Republic) J Lehečka	7	6

Final
(Germany) D Brown (Austria) T-S Weissborn	4	0
(Czech Republic) V Kopřiva (Czech Republic) J Lehečka	6	6
