= 2022 Aspria Tennis Cup – Doubles =

Doubles
- 2022 Aspria Tennis Cup

Final
- Champions: (Italy) Luciano Darderi (Brazil) Fernando Romboli
- Runners-up: (Ecuador) Diego Hidalgo (Colombia) Cristian Rodríguez
- Score: 6–4, 2–6, [10–5]

Events
Singles	Doubles
← 2021 ·	Aspria Tennis Cup	· 2023 →

Vít Kopřiva and Jiří Lehečka were the defending champions but chose not to defend their title.

Luciano Darderi and Fernando Romboli won the title after defeating Diego Hidalgo and Cristian Rodríguez 6–4, 2–6, [10–5] in the final.

== Seeds ==
1. (United States) Nathaniel Lammons / (United States) Jackson Withrow (first round)
2. (Ecuador) Diego Hidalgo / (Colombia) Cristian Rodríguez (final)
3. (Monaco) Romain Arneodo / (France) Jonathan Eysseric (semifinals)
4. (Italy) Luciano Darderi / (Brazil) Fernando Romboli (champions)

== Draw ==
=== Key ===
- Q = Qualifier
- WC = Wild card
- LL = Lucky loser
- Alt = Alternate
- SE = Special exempt
- PR = Protected ranking
- ITF = ITF entry
- JE = Junior exempt
- w/o = Walkover
- r = Retired
- d = Defaulted
- SR = Special ranking

First round
1	(United States) N Lammons (United States) J Withrow	7^{14}	3	[8]
(Kazakhstan) G Lomakin (Ukraine) V Manafov	6^{12}	6	[10]
A Vatutin (Austria) T-S Weissborn	6	6
(Croatia) Z Babić (Germany) F Fallert	2	2
4	(Italy) L Darderi (Brazil) F Romboli	6	6
PR	(Peru) A Merino (Czech Republic) P Nouza	1	4
(Poland) P Matuszewski (Czech Republic) A Paulson	6	6
(Norway) V Durasovic (Bosnia and Herzegovina) A Šetkić	3	1
WC	(Italy) F Arnaboldi (Italy) G Ferrari	6	6
PR	(Italy) R Brancaccio (Spain) Í Cervantes	2	3
(France) M Martineau (Argentina) JB Torres	3	7^{7}	[6]
3	(Monaco) R Arneodo (France) J Eysseric	6	6^{4}	[10]
(Philippines) T Huey (Croatia) F Škugor	6	7
(Romania) VV Cornea (Czech Republic) A Pavlásek	4	5
WC	(Italy) M Gigante (Italy) F Maestrelli	4	2
2	(Ecuador) D Hidalgo (Colombia) C Rodríguez	6	6

Quarterfinals
(Kazakhstan) G Lomakin (Ukraine) V Manafov	7^{7}	7^{7}
A Vatutin (Austria) T-S Weissborn	6^{4}	6^{2}
4	(Italy) L Darderi (Brazil) F Romboli	4	6	[10]
(Poland) P Matuszewski (Czech Republic) A Paulson	6	2	[8]
WC	(Italy) F Arnaboldi (Italy) G Ferrari	6	3	[5]
3	(Monaco) R Arneodo (France) J Eysseric	4	6	[10]
(Philippines) T Huey (Croatia) F Škugor	6	3	[7]
2	(Ecuador) D Hidalgo (Colombia) C Rodríguez	4	6	[10]

Semifinals
(Kazakhstan) G Lomakin (Ukraine) V Manafov	2	6^{4}
4	(Italy) L Darderi (Brazil) F Romboli	6	7^{7}
3	(Monaco) R Arneodo (France) J Eysseric	5	5
2	(Ecuador) D Hidalgo (Colombia) C Rodríguez	7	7

Final
4	(Italy) L Darderi (Brazil) F Romboli	6	2	[10]
2	(Ecuador) D Hidalgo (Colombia) C Rodríguez	4	6	[5]
