= 2025 Argentina Open – Doubles =

Doubles
- 2025 Argentina Open

Final
- Champions: (Argentina) Guido Andreozzi (France) Théo Arribagé
- Runners-up: (Brazil) Rafael Matos (Brazil) Marcelo Melo
- Score: 7–5, 4–6, [10–7]

Events
Singles	Doubles
← 2024 ·	Argentina Open	· 2026 →

Guido Andreozzi and Théo Arribagé defeated Rafael Matos and Marcelo Melo in the final, 7–5, 4–6, [10–7] to win the doubles tennis title at the 2025 Argentina Open. It was Arribagé's first ATP Tour doubles title and Andreozzi's second.

Simone Bolelli and Andrea Vavassori were the reigning champions, but did not participate this year.

== Seeds ==
1. (Argentina) Máximo González / (Argentina) Andrés Molteni (first round)
2. (France) Sadio Doumbia / (France) Fabien Reboul (first round)
3. (Brazil) Rafael Matos / (Brazil) Marcelo Melo (final)
4. (Austria) Alexander Erler / (Germany) Constantin Frantzen (semifinals)

== Draw ==
=== Key ===
- Q = Qualifier
- WC = Wild card
- LL = Lucky loser
- Alt = Alternate
- SE = Special exempt
- PR = Protected ranking
- ITF = ITF entry
- JE = Junior exempt
- w/o = Walkover
- r = Retired
- d = Defaulted
- SR = Special ranking

=== Draw ===
First round
1	(Argentina) M González (Argentina) A Molteni	6^{3}	2
(Argentina) G Andreozzi (France) T Arribagé	7^{7}	6
(Italy) L Darderi (Argentina) M Navone	6^{3}	7^{7}	[10]
(Ecuador) D Hidalgo (Chile) A Tabilo	7^{7}	6^{2}	[3]
4	(Austria) A Erler (Germany) C Frantzen	6	6
Alt	(Argentina) JP Ficovich (Argentina) M Kestelboim	3	4
WC	(Argentina) A Collarini (Argentina) G Durán	4	3
(France) G Jacq (Brazil) O Luz	6	6
Alt	(Bolivia) B Arias (Bolivia) F Zeballos	0	2
(Portugal) F Cabral (Netherlands) J-J Rojer	6	6
Alt	(Argentina) L Midón (Argentina) G Villanueva	6^{2}	2
3	(Brazil) R Matos (Brazil) M Melo	7^{7}	6
(Bosnia and Herzegovina) D Džumhur (Serbia) D Lajović	7	6^{2}	[10]
WC	(Argentina) RA Burruchaga (Argentina) JB Torres	5	7^{7}	[8]
(Argentina) F Cerúndolo (Argentina) TM Etcheverry	7	6
2	(France) S Doumbia (France) F Reboul	5	4

Quarterfinals
(Argentina) G Andreozzi (France) T Arribagé	6	6
(Italy) L Darderi (Argentina) M Navone	3	1
4	(Austria) A Erler (Germany) C Frantzen	6	7
(France) G Jacq (Brazil) O Luz	4	5
(Portugal) F Cabral (Netherlands) J-J Rojer	4	7^{7}	[8]
3	(Brazil) R Matos (Brazil) M Melo	6	6^{3}	[10]
(Bosnia and Herzegovina) D Džumhur (Serbia) D Lajović	6^{3}	1
(Argentina) F Cerúndolo (Argentina) TM Etcheverry	7^{7}	6

Semifinals
(Argentina) G Andreozzi (France) T Arribagé	6	6
4	(Austria) A Erler (Germany) C Frantzen	1	4
3	(Brazil) R Matos (Brazil) M Melo	w/o
(Argentina) F Cerúndolo (Argentina) TM Etcheverry

Final
(Argentina) G Andreozzi (France) T Arribagé	7	4	[10]
3	(Brazil) R Matos (Brazil) M Melo	5	6	[7]
