= 2019 Savannah Challenger =

- Date: 29 April – 5 May
- Edition: 11th
- Draw: 48S / 16D
- Surface: Green clay
- Location: Savannah, Georgia, United States

Champions

Singles
- (Argentina) Federico Coria

Doubles
- (Venezuela) Roberto Maytín / (Brazil) Fernando Romboli
- Savannah Challenger

The 2019 Savannah Challenger was a professional tennis tournament played on clay courts. It was the eleventh edition of the tournament which was part of the 2019 ATP Challenger Tour. It took place in Savannah, Georgia, United States between April 29 and May 5, 2019.

== Singles main-draw entrants ==
=== Seeds ===
| Country | Player | Rank^{1} | Seed |
|---|---|---|---|
| USA | Tennys Sandgren | 103 | 1 |
| ITA | Paolo Lorenzi | 108 | 2 |
| FRA | Corentin Moutet | 133 | 3 |
| USA | Noah Rubin | 143 | 4 |
| USA | Tommy Paul | 158 | 5 |
| USA | Christopher Eubanks | 165 | 6 |
| AUS | Marc Polmans | 170 | 7 |
| GER | Mats Moraing | 219 | 8 |
| DEN | Mikael Torpegaard | 229 | 9 |
| CRO | Nino Serdarušić | 244 | 10 |
| USA | JC Aragone | 245 | 11 |
| ECU | Emilio Gómez | 251 | 12 |
| BRA | Guilherme Clezar | 256 | 13 |
| USA | Thai-Son Kwiatkowski | 258 | 14 |
| ARG | Federico Coria | 268 | 15 |
| DOM | Roberto Cid Subervi | 279 | 16 |

- ^{1} Rankings are as of April 22, 2019.

=== Other entrants ===
The following players received wildcards into the singles main draw:

- (United States) Jordi Arconada
- (United States) Christopher Eubanks
- (United States) Cannon Kingsley
- (United States) Sebastian Korda
- (United States) Tennys Sandgren

The following players received entry into the singles main using their ITF World Tennis Ranking:

- (Switzerland) Sandro Ehrat
- (France) Manuel Guinard
- (France) Arthur Rinderknech
- (United States) Alexander Ritschard
- (Argentina) Camilo Ugo Carabelli

The following players received entry from the qualifying draw:

- (Venezuela) Ricardo Rodríguez
- (United States) Evan Zhu

== Champions ==
=== Singles ===
- (Argentina) Federico Coria def. (Italy) Paolo Lorenzi 6–3, 4–6, 6–2.

=== Doubles ===
- (Venezuela) Roberto Maytín / (Brazil) Fernando Romboli def. (France) Manuel Guinard / (France) Arthur Rinderknech 6–7^{(5–7)}, 6–4, [11–9].
