= 2019 Savannah Challenger – Singles =

Singles
- 2019 Savannah Challenger

Final
- Champion: (Argentina) Federico Coria
- Runner-up: (Italy) Paolo Lorenzi
- Score: 6–3, 4–6, 6–2

Events
Singles	Doubles
- Savannah Challenger

Hugo Dellien was the defending champion but chose not to defend his title.

Federico Coria won the title after defeating Paolo Lorenzi 6–3, 4–6, 6–2 in the final.

== Seeds ==
All seeds receive a bye into the second round.

1. (United States) Tennys Sandgren (third round)
2. (Italy) Paolo Lorenzi (final)
3. (France) Corentin Moutet (quarterfinals)
4. (United States) Noah Rubin (second round)
5. (United States) Tommy Paul (quarterfinals, withdrew)
6. (United States) Christopher Eubanks (quarterfinals)
7. (Australia) Marc Polmans (second round)
8. (Germany) Mats Moraing (second round, retired)
9. (Denmark) Mikael Torpegaard (second round)
10. (Croatia) Nino Serdarušić (second round)
11. (United States) JC Aragone (second round)
12. (Ecuador) Emilio Gómez (second round)
13. (Brazil) Guilherme Clezar (second round)
14. (United States) Thai-Son Kwiatkowski (third round)
15. (Argentina) Federico Coria (champion)
16. (Dominican Republic) Roberto Cid Subervi (third round)

== Draw ==
Key

- Q = Qualifier
- WC = Wild card
- LL = Lucky loser
- Alt = Alternate
- ITF = ITF entry
- PR = Protected ranking
- SR = Special ranking
- SE = Special exempt
- JE = Junior exempt
- JR = Junior Accelerator Programme entrant
- CO = College Accelerator Programme entrant
- NG = Next Gen Accelerator Program entrant
- w/o = Walkover
- r = Retired
- d = Defaulted

=== Finals ===
Quarterfinals
15	(Argentina) Federico Coria	6	6
(France) Alexandre Müller	4	1
(Australia) Aleksandar Vukic	w/o
5	(United States) Tommy Paul
(India) Sumit Nagal	6	7
3	(France) Corentin Moutet	4	5
6/WC	(United States) Christopher Eubanks	3	3
2	(Italy) Paolo Lorenzi	6	6

Semifinals
15	(Argentina) Federico Coria	6	6
(Australia) Aleksandar Vukic	4	0
(India) Sumit Nagal	4	6	2
2	(Italy) Paolo Lorenzi	6	4	6

Final
15	(Argentina) Federico Coria	6	4	6
2	(Italy) Paolo Lorenzi	3	6	2

=== Top half ===
==== Section 1 ====
First round
(United Kingdom) B Klein	1	1^{r}
ITF	(United States) A Ritschard	6	3
(United States) R Shane	1	4
ITF	(France) A Rinderknech	6	6
(France) A Müller	6	5	7^{8}
(Germany) B Hassan	1	7	6^{6}
(United States) U Blanch	4
(Australia) D Kelly	1^{r}

Second round
1/WC	(United States) T Sandgren	6	3	6
ITF	(United States) A Ritschard	2	6	3
ITF	(France) A Rinderknech	2	5
15	(Argentina) F Coria	6	7
11	(United States) JC Aragone	6^{4}	6^{4}
(France) A Müller	7^{7}	7^{7}
(United States) U Blanch	6	6
7	(Australia) M Polmans	3	3

Third round
1/WC	(United States) T Sandgren	2	6^{5}
15	(Argentina) F Coria	6	7^{7}
(France) A Müller	2	6	6
(United States) U Blanch	6	3	1

Quarterfinals
15	(Argentina) F Coria	6	6
(France) A Müller	4	1

==== Section 2 ====
First round
(United States) C Altamirano	6	7^{7}
(Russia) A Avidzba	0	6^{1}
(Australia) A Vukic	6	7^{13}
(United States) S Kozlov	2	6^{11}
(Colombia) A González	6	6
WC	(United States) Jordi Arconada	4	2
ITF	(Switzerland) S Ehrat	6	6
(Uruguay) M Cuevas	0	0

Second round
4	(United States) N Rubin	6	2	2
(United States) C Altamirano	2	6	6
(Australia) A Vukic	7^{7}	6^{6}	6
13	(Brazil) G Clezar	6^{2}	7^{8}	3
12	(Ecuador) E Gómez	0	3
(Colombia) A González	6	6
ITF	(Switzerland) S Ehrat	7	3	4
5	(United States) T Paul	5	6	6

Third round
(United States) C Altamirano	6^{3}	0^{r}
(Australia) A Vukic	7^{7}	0
(Colombia) A González	6	6^{2}	5
5	(United States) T Paul	4	7^{7}	7

Quarterfinals
(Australia) A Vukic	w/o
5	(United States) T Paul

=== Bottom half ===
==== Section 3 ====
First round
(India) S Nagal	6^{3}	6	7
(Peru) JP Varillas	7^{7}	2	5
(United States) Jared Hiltzik	4	0
WC	(United States) S Korda	6	6
Q	(United States) E Zhu	5	4
(Argentina) A Collarini	7	6
WC	(United States) C Kingsley	6	6
(Germany) J Härteis	2	2

Second round
8	(Germany) M Moraing	1	2^{r}
(India) S Nagal	6	4
WC	(United States) S Korda	6	6
9	(Denmark) M Torpegaard	3	3
14	(United States) T-S Kwiatkowski	6	7
(Argentina) A Collarini	3	5
WC	(United States) C Kingsley	1	1
3	(France) C Moutet	6	6

Third round
(India) S Nagal	6	7^{7}
WC	(United States) S Korda	3	6^{0}
14	(United States) T-S Kwiatkowski	4	2
3	(France) C Moutet	6	6

Quarterfinals
(India) S Nagal	6	7
3	(France) C Moutet	4	5

==== Section 4 ====
First round
(Kazakhstan) D Yevseyev	6	2	6
ITF	(Argentina) C Ugo Carabelli	4	6	1
(Chile) MT Barrios Vera	6	6
(Brazil) T Seyboth Wild	4	0
(United States) D Novikov	3	6	4
ITF	(France) M Guinard	6	4	6
Q	(Venezuela) R Rodríguez	2	2
(Vietnam) NH Lý	6	6

Second round
6/WC	(United States) C Eubanks	6	6
(Kazakhstan) D Yevseyev	3	4
(Chile) MT Barrios Vera	1	6	6
10	(Croatia) N Serdarušić	6	3	1
16	(Dominican Republic) R Cid Subervi	6	6
ITF	(France) M Guinard	4	4
(Vietnam) NH Lý	3	2
2	(Italy) P Lorenzi	6	6

Third round
6/WC	(United States) C Eubanks	6	6
(Chile) MT Barrios Vera	2	3
16	(Dominican Republic) R Cid Subervi	4	6	5
2	(Italy) P Lorenzi	6	2	7

Quarterfinals
6/WC	(United States) C Eubanks	3	3
2	(Italy) P Lorenzi	6	6
