= 2023 Argentina Open – Singles =

Singles
- 2023 Argentina Open

Final
- Champion: (Spain) Carlos Alcaraz
- Runner-up: (United Kingdom) Cameron Norrie
- Score: 6–3, 7–5

Details
- Draw: 28 (4 Q / 3 WC )
- Seeds: 8

Events
Singles	Doubles
- ATP Buenos Aires

Carlos Alcaraz defeated Cameron Norrie in the final, 6–3, 7–5 to win the singles tennis title at the 2023 Argentina Open.

Casper Ruud was the reigning champion, but chose not to compete this year.

== Seeds ==
The top four seeds received a bye into the second round.

1. (Spain) Carlos Alcaraz (champion)
2. (United Kingdom) Cameron Norrie (final)
3. (Italy) Lorenzo Musetti (quarterfinals)
4. (Argentina) Diego Schwartzman (second round)
5. (Argentina) Francisco Cerúndolo (quarterfinals)
6. (Argentina) Sebastián Báez (first round)
7. (Slovakia) Alex Molčan (first round)
8. (Spain) Albert Ramos Viñolas (first round)

== Draw ==
Key

- Q = Qualifier
- WC = Wild card
- LL = Lucky loser
- Alt = Alternate
- ITF = ITF entry
- PR = Protected ranking
- SR = Special ranking
- SE = Special exempt
- JE = Junior exempt
- JR = Junior Accelerator Programme entrant
- CO = College Accelerator Programme entrant
- NG = Next Gen Accelerator Program entrant
- w/o = Walkover
- r = Retired
- d = Defaulted

=== Finals ===
Semifinals
1	(Spain) Carlos Alcaraz	6	6
(Spain) Bernabé Zapata Miralles	2	2
Q	(Peru) Juan Pablo Varillas	6^{5}	4
2	(United Kingdom) Cameron Norrie	7^{7}	6

Final
1	(Spain) Carlos Alcaraz	6	7
2	(United Kingdom) Cameron Norrie	3	5

=== Top half ===
First round
(Italy) F Fognini	4	4
(Serbia) L Đere	6	6
(Colombia) DE Galán	6^{7}	3
Q	(Argentina) C Ugo Carabelli	7^{9}	6
Q	(Serbia) D Lajović	3	7^{7}	6
6	(Argentina) S Báez	6	6^{5}	3
(Spain) P Martínez	1	6	4
(Spain) B Zapata Miralles	6	3	6
(Spain) J Munar	6	7
WC	(Argentina) G Pella	4	5
Q	(Germany) Y Hanfmann	2	6	5
5	(Argentina) F Cerúndolo	6	4	7

Second round
1	(Spain) C Alcaraz	6	4	6
(Serbia) L Đere	2	6	2
Q	(Argentina) C Ugo Carabelli	3	1
Q	(Serbia) D Lajović	6	6
4	(Argentina) D Schwartzman	1	3
(Spain) B Zapata Miralles	6	6
(Spain) J Munar	2	1
5	(Argentina) F Cerúndolo	6	6

Quarterfinals
1	(Spain) C Alcaraz	6	6
Q	(Serbia) D Lajović	4	2
(Spain) B Zapata Miralles	6	6^{4}	6
5	(Argentina) F Cerúndolo	3	7^{7}	3

Semifinals
1	(Spain) C Alcaraz	6	6
(Spain) B Zapata Miralles	2	2

=== Bottom half ===
First round
7	(Slovakia) A Molčan	6^{4}	3
WC	(Austria) D Thiem	7^{7}	6
Q	(Peru) JP Varillas	6	7
(Portugal) J Sousa	2	5
(Brazil) T Monteiro	6^{2}	4
(Argentina) P Cachin	7^{7}	6
8	(Spain) A Ramos Viñolas	5	4
(Spain) R Carballés Baena	7	6
(Argentina) TM Etcheverry	3	6	6
PR	(Bolivia) H Dellien	6	2	2
WC	(Argentina) F Díaz Acosta	7^{7}	7
(Argentina) F Coria	6^{5}	5

Second round
WC	(Austria) D Thiem	4	4
Q	(Peru) JP Varillas	6	6
(Argentina) P Cachin	2	3
3	(Italy) L Musetti	6	6
(Spain) R Carballés Baena	6	1	2
(Argentina) TM Etcheverry	4	6	6
WC	(Argentina) F Díaz Acosta	6	5	6^{6}
2	(United Kingdom) C Norrie	4	7	7^{8}

Quarterfinals
Q	(Peru) JP Varillas	6	6
3	(Italy) L Musetti	4	4
(Argentina) TM Etcheverry	7	0	3
2	(United Kingdom) C Norrie	5	6	6

Semifinals
Q	(Peru) JP Varillas	6^{5}	4
2	(United Kingdom) C Norrie	7^{7}	6

== Qualifying ==
=== Seeds ===
1. (Argentina) Facundo Bagnis (qualifying competition)
2. (Serbia) Dušan Lajović (qualified)
3. (Peru) Juan Pablo Varillas (qualified)
4. (France) Hugo Gaston (qualifying competition)
5. (Argentina) Juan Manuel Cerúndolo (first round)
6. (Kazakhstan) Timofey Skatov (first round)
7. (Chile) Nicolás Jarry (first round)
8. (Argentina) Federico Delbonis (qualifying competition)

=== Qualifiers ===
1. (Argentina) Camilo Ugo Carabelli
2. (Serbia) Dušan Lajović
3. (Peru) Juan Pablo Varillas
4. (Germany) Yannick Hanfmann

=== Qualifying draw ===
==== First qualifier ====
First round
1	(Argentina) Facundo Bagnis	7	6
(Italy) Franco Agamenone	5	1
(Argentina) Camilo Ugo Carabelli	6	6
6	(Kazakhstan) Timofey Skatov	2	1

Qualifying competition
1	(Argentina) Facundo Bagnis	6^{3}	6	2
(Argentina) Camilo Ugo Carabelli	7^{7}	4	6

==== Second qualifier ====
First round
2	(Serbia) Dušan Lajović	6	6
Alt	(Argentina) Renzo Olivo	3	4
Alt	(Brazil) Felipe Meligeni Alves	7^{7}	6
7	(Chile) Nicolás Jarry	6^{3}	4

Qualifying competition
2	(Serbia) Dušan Lajović	6	6
Alt	(Brazil) Felipe Meligeni Alves	3	3

==== Third qualifier ====
First round
3	(Peru) Juan Pablo Varillas	6	6
WC	(Argentina) Thiago Agustín Tirante	2	4
Alt	(Italy) Andrea Pellegrino	6^{5}	0
8	(Argentina) Federico Delbonis	7^{7}	6

Qualifying competition
3	(Peru) Juan Pablo Varillas	7	6
8	(Argentina) Federico Delbonis	5	2

==== Fourth qualifier ====
First round
4	(France) Hugo Gaston	6	5	6
(Slovakia) Jozef Kovalík	4	7	2
(Germany) Yannick Hanfmann	6	3	6
5/WC	(Argentina) Juan Manuel Cerúndolo	3	6	2

Qualifying competition
4	(France) Hugo Gaston	1	0
(Germany) Yannick Hanfmann	6	6
