= 2021 Moneta Czech Open – Singles =

Singles
- 2021 Moneta Czech Open

Final
- Champion: (Argentina) Federico Coria
- Runner-up: (Slovakia) Alex Molčan
- Score: 7–6^{(7–1)}, 6–3

Events
Singles	Doubles
- Moneta Czech Open

Kamil Majchrzak was the defending champion but chose not to defend his title.

Federico Coria won the title after defeating Alex Molčan 7–6^{(7–1)}, 6–3 in the final.

== Seeds ==
1. (Spain) Pablo Andújar (first round)
2. (Czech Republic) Jiří Veselý (second round)
3. (Italy) Gianluca Mager (semifinals)
4. (Argentina) Federico Coria (champion)
5. (Bolivia) Hugo Dellien (quarterfinals)
6. (Slovakia) Jozef Kovalík (first round)
7. (Argentina) Juan Manuel Cerúndolo (first round, retired)
8. (Slovenia) Blaž Rola (quarterfinals)

== Draw ==
Key

- Q = Qualifier
- WC = Wild card
- LL = Lucky loser
- Alt = Alternate
- ITF = ITF entry
- PR = Protected ranking
- SR = Special ranking
- SE = Special exempt
- JE = Junior exempt
- JR = Junior Accelerator Programme entrant
- CO = College Accelerator Programme entrant
- NG = Next Gen Accelerator Program entrant
- w/o = Walkover
- r = Retired
- d = Defaulted

=== Finals ===
Semifinals
(Slovakia) Alex Molčan	6	6
3	(Italy) Gianluca Mager	1	3
4	(Argentina) Federico Coria	6	6
(Czech Republic) Zdeněk Kolář	4	2

Final
(Slovakia) Alex Molčan	6^{1}	3
4	(Argentina) Federico Coria	7^{7}	6

=== Top half ===
First round
1	(Spain) P Andújar	6	1	4
(Japan) Yo Watanuki	1	6	6
(Slovakia) A Molčan	6	6
Q	(Czech Republic) D Poljak	3	3
(Portugal) G Oliveira	3	6	4
(Czech Republic) M Vrbenský	6	2	6
WC	(Czech Republic) A Paulson	1	3
5	(Bolivia) H Dellien	6	6
3	(Italy) G Mager	6	6
Alt	(Czech Republic) J Forejtek	3	3
WC	(Czech Republic) D Siniakov	1	0
(Argentina) S Báez	6	6
(Germany) M Bachinger	6	0	1
WC	(Czech Republic) D Svrčina	2	6	6
Q	(Austria) A Erler	7^{7}	4
7	(Argentina) JM Cerúndolo	6^{1}	2^{r}

Second round
(Japan) Yo Watanuki	1	2
(Slovakia) A Molčan	6	6
(Czech Republic) M Vrbenský	1	2
5	(Bolivia) H Dellien	6	6
3	(Italy) G Mager	7^{10}	6
(Argentina) S Báez	6^{8}	2
WC	(Czech Republic) D Svrčina	6	7
Q	(Austria) A Erler	1	5

Quarterfinals
(Slovakia) A Molčan	6	6
5	(Bolivia) H Dellien	3	1
3	(Italy) G Mager	6	6
WC	(Czech Republic) D Svrčina	3	2

Semifinals
(Slovakia) A Molčan	6	6
3	(Italy) G Mager	1	3

=== Bottom half ===
First round
8	(Slovenia) B Rola	6	7
Q	(United States) A Rybakov	1	5
(Czech Republic) J Lehečka	5	5
(Slovakia) L Klein	7	7
PR	(Russia) A Kuznetsov	6	7^{7}
LL	(Netherlands) J Sels	0	6^{4}
LL	(Germany) J Härteis	1	0
4	(Argentina) F Coria	6	6
6	(Slovakia) J Kovalík	6	6^{4}	4
(Czech Republic) V Kopřiva	2	7^{7}	6
(Austria) L Miedler	2	2
(Czech Republic) Z Kolář	6	6
Q	(Tunisia) S Mansouri	0	6	2
(Germany) T Kamke	6	3	6
(Argentina) F Mena	2	6^{5}
2	(Czech Republic) J Veselý	6	7^{7}

Second round
8	(Slovenia) B Rola	6	3	7^{8}
(Slovakia) L Klein	4	6	6^{6}
PR	(Russia) A Kuznetsov	7^{7}	5	2
4	(Argentina) F Coria	6^{0}	7	6
(Czech Republic) V Kopřiva	3	6^{3}
(Czech Republic) Z Kolář	6	7^{7}
(Germany) T Kamke	6	6
2	(Czech Republic) J Veselý	3	4

Quarterfinals
8	(Slovenia) B Rola	4	1
4	(Argentina) F Coria	6	6
(Czech Republic) Z Kolář	6	6
(Germany) T Kamke	2	3

Semifinals
4	(Argentina) F Coria	6	6
(Czech Republic) Z Kolář	4	2
