= 2025 Argentina Open – Singles =

Singles
- 2025 Argentina Open

Final
- Champion: (Brazil) João Fonseca
- Runner-up: (Argentina) Francisco Cerúndolo
- Score: 6–4, 7–6^{(7–1)}

Details
- Draw: 28 (4 Q / 3 WC )
- Seeds: 8

Events
Singles	Doubles
- Argentina Open

João Fonseca defeated Francisco Cerúndolo in the final, 6–4, 7–6^{(7–1)} to win the singles tennis title at the 2025 Argentina Open. He saved two match points (in the quarterfinals against Mariano Navone) en route to his first ATP Tour title. Fonseca was the youngest Brazilian man and the second-youngest South American in the Open Era, behind only Guillermo Pérez Roldán in 1987, and the first man born in 2006, to win a top-level title. He entered the tournament through the Next Gen Accelerator Program introduced by the ATP in 2024, being the first player entered under the system to win a tour-level title. Fonseca was the first Brazilian man to win the Argentina Open title since Gustavo Kuerten in 2001, and the lowest-ranked champion (world No. 99) in tournament history.

Facundo Díaz Acosta was the defending champion, but lost in the first round to Thiago Seyboth Wild.

This tournament marked the final professional appearance of former world No. 8 Diego Schwartzman. He defeated seventh seed Nicolás Jarry in the first round, before losing in the second round to Pedro Martínez.

== Seeds ==
The top four seeds received a bye into the second round.

1. (Germany) Alexander Zverev (quarterfinals)
2. (Denmark) Holger Rune (second round)
3. (Italy) Lorenzo Musetti (quarterfinals, withdrew)
4. (Chile) Alejandro Tabilo (second round)
5. (Argentina) Francisco Cerúndolo (final)
6. (Argentina) Sebastián Báez (second round)
7. (Chile) Nicolás Jarry (first round)
8. (Argentina) Tomás Martín Etcheverry (first round)

== Draw ==
Key

- Q = Qualifier
- WC = Wild card
- LL = Lucky loser
- Alt = Alternate
- ITF = ITF entry
- PR = Protected ranking
- SR = Special ranking
- SE = Special exempt
- JE = Junior exempt
- JR = Junior Accelerator Programme entrant
- CO = College Accelerator Programme entrant
- NG = Next Gen Accelerator Program entrant
- w/o = Walkover
- r = Retired
- d = Defaulted

=== Finals ===
Semifinals
5	(Argentina) Francisco Cerúndolo	6	6
(Spain) Pedro Martínez	2	4
Q	(Serbia) Laslo Djere	6^{3}	7	1
(Brazil) João Fonseca	7^{7}	5	6

Final
5	(Argentina) Francisco Cerúndolo	4	6^{1}
(Brazil) João Fonseca	6	7^{7}

=== Top half ===
First round
(Spain) R Carballés Baena	6^{8}	5
(Serbia) D Lajović	7^{10}	7
Q	(Argentina) RA Burruchaga	6^{4}	7	5
Q	(Argentina) JM Cerúndolo	7^{7}	5	7
(Italy) L Darderi	4	4
5	(Argentina) F Cerúndolo	6	6
(France) C Moutet	7	6
LL	(India) S Nagal	5	2
(Bosnia and Herzegovina) D Džumhur	6	2	6^{3}
(Spain) P Martínez	0	6	7^{7}
WC	(Argentina) D Schwartzman	7^{12}	4	6
7	(Chile) N Jarry	6^{10}	6	3

Second round
1	(Germany) A Zverev	6	6
(Serbia) D Lajović	4	4
Q	(Argentina) JM Cerúndolo	2	3
5	(Argentina) F Cerúndolo	6	6
3	(Italy) L Musetti	6	6
(France) C Moutet	2	3
(Spain) P Martínez	6	6
WC	(Argentina) D Schwartzman	2	2

Quarterfinals
1	(Germany) A Zverev	6	3	2
5	(Argentina) F Cerúndolo	3	6	6
3	(Italy) L Musetti
(Spain) P Martínez	w/o

Semifinals
5	(Argentina) F Cerúndolo	6	6
(Spain) P Martínez	2	4

=== Bottom half ===
First round
6	(Argentina) S Báez	6	6
WC	(Argentina) C Ugo Carabelli	4	4
(Argentina) F Díaz Acosta	6	2	3
(Brazil) T Seyboth Wild	3	6	6
(France) A Müller	3	3
Q	(Serbia) L Djere	6	6
8	(Argentina) TM Etcheverry	3	3
(Brazil) J Fonseca	6	6
(France) H Gaston	3	2
LL	(Argentina) F Coria	6	6
(Argentina) M Navone	6	6
WC	(Argentina) F Comesaña	4	4

Second round
6	(Argentina) S Báez	3	4
(Brazil) T Seyboth Wild	6	6
Q	(Serbia) L Djere	2	6	7^{7}
4	(Chile) A Tabilo	6	1	6^{2}
(Brazil) J Fonseca	2	6	6
LL	(Argentina) F Coria	6	4	2
(Argentina) M Navone	6	7^{7}
2	(Denmark) H Rune	1	6^{2}

Quarterfinals
(Brazil) T Seyboth Wild	6^{3}	3
Q	(Serbia) L Djere	7^{7}	6
(Brazil) J Fonseca	3	6	7
(Argentina) M Navone	6	4	5

Semifinals
Q	(Serbia) L Djere	6^{3}	7	1
(Brazil) J Fonseca	7^{7}	5	6

== Qualifying ==
=== Seeds ===
1. (Italy) Francesco Passaro (qualified, withdrew)
2. (Brazil) Thiago Monteiro (first round)
3. (Argentina) Federico Coria (qualifying competition, lucky loser)
4. (India) Sumit Nagal (qualifying competition, retired, lucky loser)
5. (Portugal) Jaime Faria (first round)
6. (Serbia) Laslo Djere (qualified)
7. (Bolivia) Hugo Dellien (withdrew, still playing in Rosario)
8. (Chinese Taipei) Tseng Chun-hsin (first round)

=== Qualifiers ===
1. (Italy) Francesco Passaro (withdrew)
2. (Argentina) Román Andrés Burruchaga
3. (Serbia) Laslo Djere
4. (Argentina) Juan Manuel Cerúndolo

=== Lucky losers ===
1. (Argentina) Federico Coria
2. (India) Sumit Nagal

=== Qualifying draw ===
==== First qualifier ====
First round
1	(Italy) Francesco Passaro	6	6
(Colombia) Daniel Elahi Galán	1	4
WC	(Argentina) Juan Bautista Torres	6	3	7
8	(Chinese Taipei) Tseng Chun-hsin	1	6	5

Qualifying competition
1	(Italy) Francesco Passaro	2	7^{8}	6
WC	(Argentina) Juan Bautista Torres	6	6^{6}	1

==== Second qualifier ====
First round
2	(Brazil) Thiago Monteiro	7	3	6^{8}
Alt	(Brazil) Felipe Meligeni Alves	5	6	7^{10}
Alt	(Argentina) Román Andrés Burruchaga	6	6
Alt	(Brazil) Gustavo Heide	3	4

Qualifying competition
Alt	(Brazil) Felipe Meligeni Alves	6	2	6^{3}
Alt	(Argentina) Román Andrés Burruchaga	2	6	7^{7}

==== Third qualifier ====
First round
3	(Argentina) Federico Coria	5	7^{10}	4
(Argentina) Thiago Agustín Tirante	7	6^{8}	1^{r}
Alt	(Argentina) Marco Trungelliti	4	4
6	(Serbia) Laslo Djere	6	6

Qualifying competition
3	(Argentina) Federico Coria	2	4
6	(Serbia) Laslo Djere	6	6

==== Fourth qualifier ====
First round
4	(India) Sumit Nagal	6^{4}	6	7^{7}
WC	(Argentina) Juan Pablo Ficovich	7^{7}	2	6^{4}
(Argentina) Juan Manuel Cerúndolo	6	7^{7}
5	(Portugal) Jaime Faria	1	6^{1}

Qualifying competition
4	(India) Sumit Nagal	6	6^{5}	0^{r}
(Argentina) Juan Manuel Cerúndolo	3	7^{7}	1
