= 2022 Aspria Tennis Cup – Singles =

Singles
- 2022 Aspria Tennis Cup

Final
- Champion: (Argentina) Federico Coria
- Runner-up: (Italy) Francesco Passaro
- Score: 7–6^{(7–2)}, 6–4

Events
Singles	Doubles
- Aspria Tennis Cup

Gian Marco Moroni was the defending champion but withdrew from the tournament due to a back injury.

Federico Coria won the title after defeating Francesco Passaro 7–6^{(7–2)}, 6–4 in the final.

== Seeds ==
1. (Argentina) Federico Coria (champion)
2. (France) Benoît Paire (first round, retired)
3. (Bolivia) Hugo Dellien (withdrew)
4. (Italy) Gian Marco Moroni (withdrew)
5. Alexander Shevchenko (semifinals)
6. (Italy) Marco Cecchinato (second round)
7. (Italy) Luciano Darderi (quarterfinals, retired)
8. (Italy) Francesco Passaro (final)

== Draw ==
Key

- Q = Qualifier
- WC = Wild card
- LL = Lucky loser
- Alt = Alternate
- ITF = ITF entry
- PR = Protected ranking
- SR = Special ranking
- SE = Special exempt
- JE = Junior exempt
- JR = Junior Accelerator Programme entrant
- CO = College Accelerator Programme entrant
- NG = Next Gen Accelerator Program entrant
- w/o = Walkover
- r = Retired
- d = Defaulted

=== Finals ===
Semifinals
1	(Argentina) Federico Coria	6	6
5	Alexander Shevchenko	4	1
8/Alt	(Italy) Francesco Passaro	7	6
Q	(Hungary) Fábián Marozsán	5	1

Final
1	(Argentina) Federico Coria	7^{7}	6
8/Alt	(Italy) Francesco Passaro	6^{2}	4

=== Top half ===
First round
1	(Argentina) F Coria	6	6
(Serbia) P Krstin	1	1
(Netherlands) R Haase	1	0^{r}
Alt	(Belgium) J De Loore	6	2
Alt	(Latvia) E Gulbis	5	7^{7}	6
(Germany) J Lenz	7	6^{1}	4
Q	(Spain) Í Cervantes	6	3	0^{r}
7	(Italy) L Darderi	4	6	3
LL	(Japan) S Mochizuki	6	6
Q	(Czech Republic) A Paulson	0	1
WC	(Italy) G Ferrari	1	7^{7}	6
(France) M Janvier	6	6^{4}	3
Q	(Italy) G Fonio	6	7^{8}
Alt	(France) M Martineau	3	6^{6}
Alt	(Bosnia and Herzegovina) A Šetkić	1	2
5	A Shevchenko	6	6

Second round
1	(Argentina) F Coria	6	6
Alt	(Belgium) J De Loore	2	0
Alt	(Latvia) E Gulbis	3	2^{r}
7	(Italy) L Darderi	6	4
LL	(Japan) S Mochizuki	6	4	6
WC	(Italy) G Ferrari	4	6	2
Q	(Italy) G Fonio	3	6^{3}
5	A Shevchenko	6	7^{7}

Quarterfinals
1	(Argentina) F Coria	6	4
7	(Italy) L Darderi	2	0^{r}
LL	(Japan) S Mochizuki	3	1
5	A Shevchenko	6	6

Semifinals
1	(Argentina) F Coria	6	6
5	A Shevchenko	4	1

=== Bottom half ===
First round
8/Alt	(Italy) F Passaro	6	6
Alt	(Romania) ND Ionel	0	4
(Canada) A Galarneau	6	6
Q	(Italy) F Arnaboldi	1	3
Q	(Poland) F Peliwo	1	3
(Italy) R Brancaccio	6	6
(Norway) V Durasovic	3	6	7
LL	(Ukraine) G Kravchenko	6	2	5
6	(Italy) M Cecchinato	7^{9}	6
(Switzerland) L Riedi	6^{7}	4
WC	(Italy) M Gigante	6	6
WC	(Italy) F Maestrelli	4	2
Q	(Hungary) F Marozsán	6	6
(Argentina) JB Torres	2	2
A Vatutin	7^{8}	0
2	(France) B Paire	6^{6}	0^{r}

Second round
8/Alt	(Italy) F Passaro	6	6
(Canada) A Galarneau	1	3
(Italy) R Brancaccio	6	1	4
(Norway) V Durasovic	4	6	6
6	(Italy) M Cecchinato	6^{3}	1
WC	(Italy) M Gigante	7^{7}	6
Q	(Hungary) F Marozsán	6	6
A Vatutin	2	3

Quarterfinals
8/Alt	(Italy) F Passaro	6	6
(Norway) V Durasovic	1	1
WC	(Italy) M Gigante	6^{5}	2
Q	(Hungary) F Marozsán	7^{7}	6

Semifinals
8/Alt	(Italy) F Passaro	7	6
Q	(Hungary) F Marozsán	5	1
