= 2022 Aspria Tennis Cup =

- Date: 20–26 June
- Edition: 16th
- Surface: Clay
- Location: Milan, Italy

Champions

Singles
- (Argentina) Federico Coria

Doubles
- (Italy) Luciano Darderi / (Brazil) Fernando Romboli
- Aspria Tennis Cup

The 2022 Aspria Tennis Cup was a professional tennis tournament played on clay courts. It was the sixteenth edition of the tournament which was part of the 2022 ATP Challenger Tour. It took place in Milan, Italy between 20 and 26 June 2022.

== Singles main-draw entrants ==
=== Seeds ===
Country	Player	Rank^{1}	Seed
ARG	Federico Coria	64	1
FRA	Benoît Paire	79	2
~~BOL~~	~~Hugo Dellien~~	~~83~~	~~3~~
~~ITA~~	~~Gian Marco Moroni~~	~~159~~	~~4~~
	Alexander Shevchenko	176	5
ITA	Marco Cecchinato	206	6
ITA	Luciano Darderi	237	7
ITA	Francesco Passaro	253	8

- ^{1} Rankings are as of 13 June 2022.

=== Other entrants ===
The following players received wildcards into the singles main draw:

- (Italy) Gianmarco Ferrari
- (Italy) Matteo Gigante
- (Italy) Francesco Maestrelli

The following players received entry into the singles main draw as alternates:

- (Belgium) Joris De Loore
- (Latvia) Ernests Gulbis
- (Romania) Nicholas David Ionel
- (France) Matteo Martineau
- (Italy) Francesco Passaro
- (Bosnia and Herzegovina) Aldin Šetkić

The following players received entry from the qualifying draw:

- (Italy) Federico Arnaboldi
- (Spain) Íñigo Cervantes
- (Italy) Giovanni Fonio
- (Hungary) Fábián Marozsán
- (Czech Republic) Andrew Paulson
- (Poland) Filip Peliwo

The following players received entry as lucky losers:

- (Ukraine) Georgii Kravchenko
- (Japan) Shintaro Mochizuki

== Champions ==
=== Singles ===
- (Argentina) Federico Coria def. (Italy) Francesco Passaro 7–6^{(7–2)}, 6–4.

=== Doubles ===
- (Italy) Luciano Darderi / (Brazil) Fernando Romboli def. (Ecuador) Diego Hidalgo / (Colombia) Cristian Rodríguez 6–4, 2–6, [10–5].
