= 2026 Argentina Open =

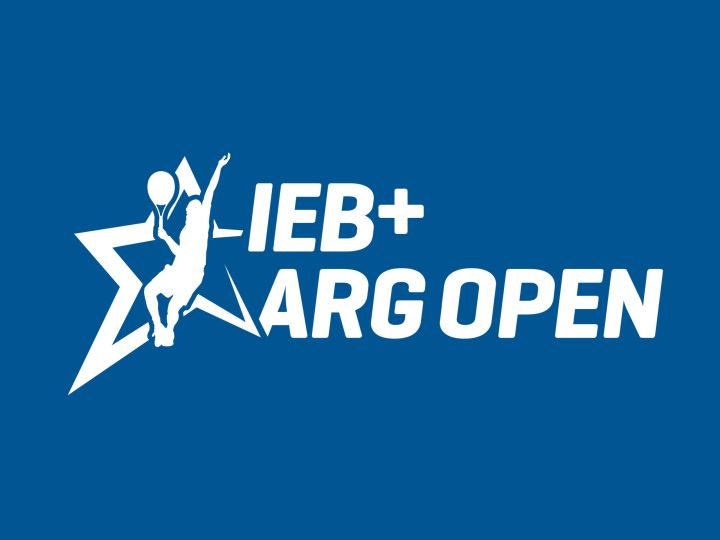
- Date: 9–15 February
- Edition: 29th
- Category: ATP Tour 250 series
- Draw: 28S / 16D
- Surface: Clay / outdoor
- Location: Buenos Aires, Argentina
- Venue: Buenos Aires Lawn Tennis Club

Champions

Singles
- (Argentina) Francisco Cerúndolo

Doubles
- (Brazil) Orlando Luz / (Brazil) Rafael Matos
- ATP Buenos Aires

The 2026 IEB+ Argentina Open was a men's tennis tournament played on outdoor clay courts. It was the 29th edition of the ATP Buenos Aires event, and part of the ATP Tour 250 series of the 2026 ATP Tour. It took place in Buenos Aires, Argentina, from 9 to 15 February 2026.

== Champions ==
=== Singles ===
- (Argentina) Francisco Cerúndolo def. (Italy) Luciano Darderi, 6–4, 6–2

=== Doubles ===
- (Brazil) Orlando Luz / (Brazil) Rafael Matos def. (Argentina) Andrea Collarini / (Argentina) Nicolás Kicker, 7–5, 6–3

== Singles main draw entrants ==
=== Seeds ===
Country	Player	Rank^{1}	Seed
ARG	Francisco Cerúndolo	19	1
ITA	Luciano Darderi	23	2
BRA	João Fonseca	34	3
ARG	Sebastián Báez	35	4
GER	Daniel Altmaier	44	5
ARG	Camilo Ugo Carabelli	48	6
ARG	Tomás Martín Etcheverry	54	7
ITA	Matteo Berrettini	58	8

- ^{1} Rankings are as of 2 February 2026.

=== Other entrants ===
The following players received wildcards into the singles main draw:

- (Argentina) Alex Barrena
- (Argentina) Federico Coria
- (Argentina) Facundo Díaz Acosta

The following players received entry from the qualifying draw:

- (Bolivia) Hugo Dellien
- (Argentina) Lautaro Midón
- (Italy) Francesco Passaro
- (Italy) Andrea Pellegrino

The following player received entry as a lucky loser:

- (Brazil) Thiago Seyboth Wild

=== Withdrawals ===
- (Chile) Cristian Garín → replaced by (Brazil) Thiago Seyboth Wild (LL)
- (Austria) Filip Misolic → replaced by (United States) Emilio Nava
- (France) Alexandre Müller → replaced by (Australia) James Duckworth
- (Italy) Lorenzo Musetti → replaced by (Argentina) Juan Manuel Cerúndolo
- (Italy) Lorenzo Sonego → replaced by (Serbia) Laslo Djere

== Doubles main draw entrants ==
=== Seeds ===
Country	Player	Country	Player	Rank^{1}	Seed
ARG	Máximo González	ARG	Andrés Molteni	57	1
ARG	Guido Andreozzi	FRA	Manuel Guinard	57	2
BRA	Orlando Luz	BRA	Rafael Matos	87	3
BRA	Marcelo Demoliner	BRA	Fernando Romboli	119	4

- ^{1} Rankings as of 2 February 2026.

=== Other entrants ===
The following pairs received wildcards into the doubles main draw:

- (Argentina) Sebastián Báez / (Argentina) Juan Bautista Torres
- (Argentina) Juan Manuel Cerúndolo / (Argentina) Mariano Kestelboim

The following pairs received entry as alternates:

- (Peru) Gonzalo Bueno / (Peru) Conner Huertas del Pino
- (Argentina) Andrea Collarini / (Argentina) Nicolás Kicker
- (Ecuador) Álvaro Guillén Meza / (Argentina) Genaro Alberto Olivieri
- (Argentina) Lautaro Midón / (Argentina) Gonzalo Villanueva

=== Withdrawals ===
- (Bosnia and Herzegovina) Tomislav Brkić / (Bosnia and Herzegovina) Damir Džumhur → replaced by (Ecuador) Álvaro Guillén Meza / (Argentina) Genaro Alberto Olivieri
- (Argentina) Francisco Cerúndolo / (Argentina) Francisco Comesaña → replaced by (Peru) Gonzalo Bueno / (Peru) Conner Huertas del Pino
- (Italy) Luciano Darderi / (Argentina) Tomás Martín Etcheverry → replaced by (Argentina) Andrea Collarini / (Argentina) Nicolás Kicker
- (Argentina) Mariano Navone / (Argentina) Camilo Ugo Carabelli → replaced by (Argentina) Lautaro Midón / (Argentina) Gonzalo Villanueva
