= 2023 Argentina Open – Doubles =

Doubles
- 2023 Argentina Open

Final
- Champions: (Italy) Simone Bolelli (Italy) Fabio Fognini
- Runners-up: (Colombia) Nicolás Barrientos (Uruguay) Ariel Behar
- Score: 6–2, 6–4

Events
Singles	Doubles
- Argentina Open

Simone Bolelli and Fabio Fognini defeated Nicolás Barrientos and Ariel Behar in the final, 6–2, 6–4 to win the doubles tennis title at the 2023 Argentina Open.

Santiago González and Andrés Molteni were the reigning champions, but González chose to compete in Rotterdam instead. Molteni partnered Máximo González, but lost in the semifinals to Barrientos and Behar.

== Seeds ==
1. (Spain) Marcel Granollers / (Argentina) Horacio Zeballos (withdrew)
2. (Brazil) Rafael Matos / (Spain) David Vega Hernández (first round)
3. (Italy) Simone Bolelli / (Italy) Fabio Fognini (champions)
4. (Argentina) Máximo González / (Argentina) Andrés Molteni (semifinals)

== Draw ==
Key

- Q = Qualifier
- WC = Wild card
- LL = Lucky loser
- Alt = Alternate
- ITF = ITF entry
- PR = Protected ranking
- SR = Special ranking
- SE = Special exempt
- JE = Junior exempt
- JR = Junior Accelerator Programme entrant
- CO = College Accelerator Programme entrant
- NG = Next Gen Accelerator Program entrant
- w/o = Walkover
- r = Retired
- d = Defaulted

=== Draw ===
First round
1	(Spain) M Granollers (Argentina) H Zeballos
(Spain) P Martínez (Spain) J Munar	w/o
Alt	(Bolivia) B Arias (Bolivia) F Zeballos	6^{6}	6^{6}
(Colombia) N Barrientos (Uruguay) A Behar	7^{8}	7^{8}
4	(Argentina) M González (Argentina) A Molteni	6	6
(Argentina) P Cachin (Argentina) F Cerúndolo	4	4
(Kazakhstan) A Golubev (Kazakhstan) A Nedovyesov	6	6
(Austria) A Erler (Austria) L Miedler	4	4
(Argentina) S Báez (Argentina) F Bagnis	7	6
WC	(Argentina) D Schwartzman (Austria) D Thiem	5	4
(France) S Doumbia (France) F Reboul	1	3
3	(Italy) S Bolelli (Italy) F Fognini	6	6
(Portugal) F Cabral (Serbia) N Ćaćić	6	6^{4}	[10]
(Bosnia and Herzegovina) T Brkić (Ecuador) G Escobar	3	7^{7}	[4]
PR	(Brazil) M Demoliner (Italy) A Vavassori	7^{7}	6
2	(Brazil) R Matos (Spain) D Vega Hernández	6^{5}	4

Quarterfinals
(Spain) P Martínez (Spain) J Munar	6^{4}	3
(Colombia) N Barrientos (Uruguay) A Behar	7^{7}	6
4	(Argentina) M González (Argentina) A Molteni	6	6^{7}	[10]
(Kazakhstan) A Golubev (Kazakhstan) A Nedovyesov	3	7^{9}	[8]
(Argentina) S Báez (Argentina) F Bagnis
3	(Italy) S Bolelli (Italy) F Fognini	w/o
(Portugal) F Cabral (Serbia) N Ćaćić	4	5
PR	(Brazil) M Demoliner (Italy) A Vavassori	6	7

Semifinals
(Colombia) N Barrientos (Uruguay) A Behar	3	6	[10]
4	(Argentina) M González (Argentina) A Molteni	6	4	[7]
3	(Italy) S Bolelli (Italy) F Fognini	6	7
PR	(Brazil) M Demoliner (Italy) A Vavassori	3	5

Final
(Colombia) N Barrientos (Uruguay) A Behar	2	4
3	(Italy) S Bolelli (Italy) F Fognini	6	6
