= Federico Coria =

Argentine tennis player (born 1992)

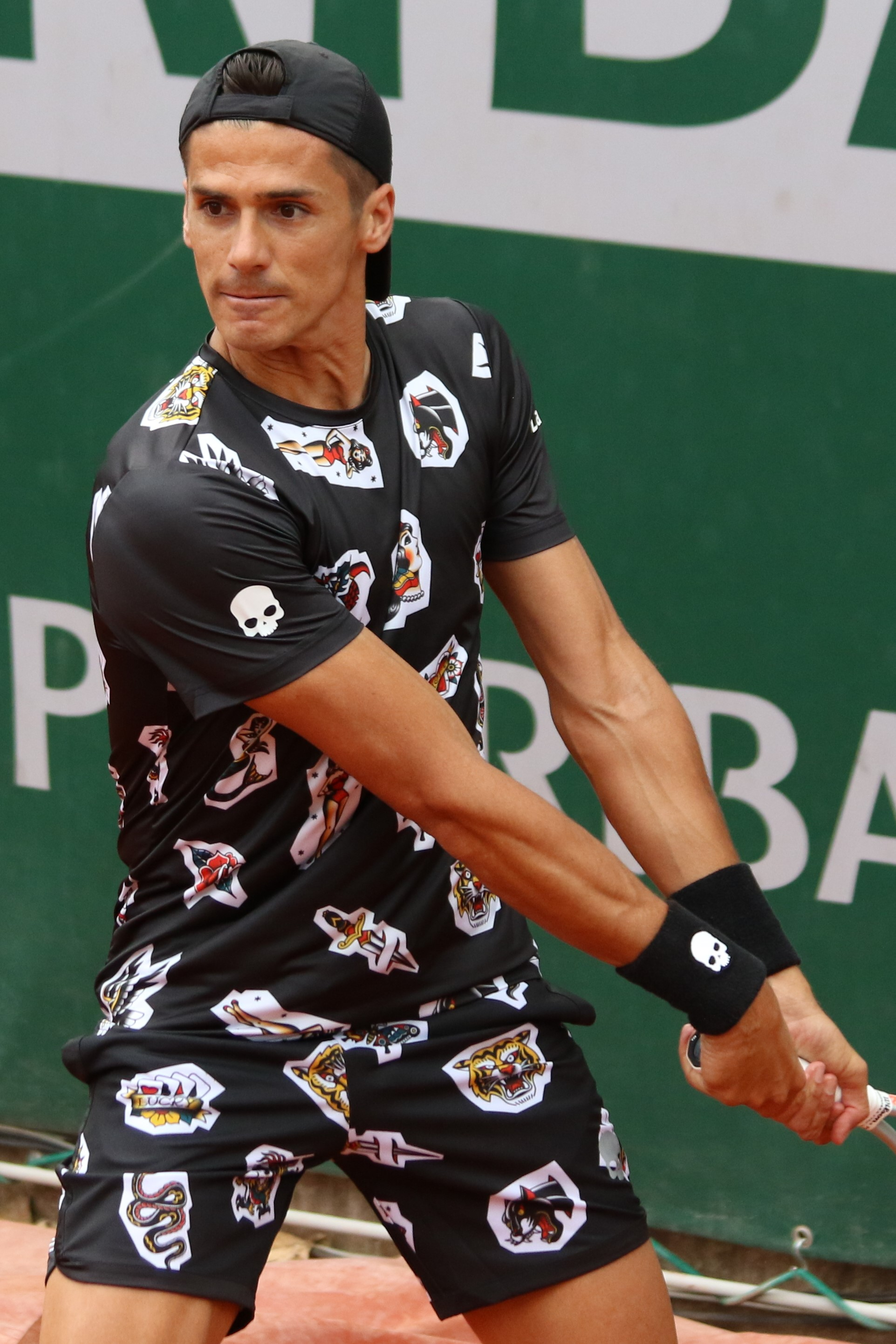
- Coria at the 2022 French Open
- Country (sports): Argentina
- Residence: Santa Fe, Argentina
- Born: 9 March 1992 (age 34) Rosario, Argentina
- Height: 1.80 m (5 ft 11 in)
- Turned pro: 2010
- Plays: Right-handed (two-handed backhand)
- Coach: Carlos Berlocq
- Prize money: US$4,068,250

Singles
- Career record: 56–79
- Career titles: 0
- Highest ranking: No. 49 (13 February 2023)
- Current ranking: No. 703 (16 November 2026)

Grand Slam singles results
- Australian Open: 1R (2021, 2022, 2023, 2024, 2025)
- French Open: 3R (2020)
- Wimbledon: 1R (2021, 2022, 2023, 2024)
- US Open: 2R (2020, 2022)

Other tournaments
- Olympic Games: 1R (2021)

Doubles
- Career record: 8–25
- Career titles: 0
- Highest ranking: No. 238 (22 November 2021)

Grand Slam doubles results
- Australian Open: 1R (2021, 2022, 2023)
- French Open: 2R (2020)
- Wimbledon: 1R (2024)
- US Open: 2R (2024)
- Last updated on: 31 August 2026.

Federico Coria (born 9 March 1992) is an Argentine professional tennis player. He has a career-high ATP singles ranking of world No. 49, achieved on 13 February 2023 and a doubles ranking of No. 238, achieved on 22 November 2021.

Coria competes on the ATP Challenger Tour and has won six singles titles and one in doubles.

== Professional career ==
=== 2019–20: Maiden Challenger title, major & top 100 debuts ===
In 2019, he won his maiden title in Savannah at the Challenger tour level.

In 2020, on his Grand Slam debut at the US Open, Coria reached the second round, where he won his first match at a Major after the retirement of Jason Jung in the fifth set. He made his top 100 debut at a career-high of World No. 98 on 21 September 2020.

He also reached the third round of a Grand Slam at the 2020 French Open on his debut at this Major, where he defeated Benoît Paire in the second round before losing to Jannik Sinner in straight sets.

=== 2021: Olympic Games, Challenger Tour success, first ATP final ===
In June 2021, he won his second challenger title at the 2021 Czech Open in Prostějov, defeating Alex Molčan. He reached two more Challengers finals in Milan and Salzburg. As a result, he reached a career-high of World No. 77 in singles on 12 July 2021.

He reached his first ATP tour final at the 2021 Swedish Open, where he lost to Casper Ruud. He raised to a new career-high of No. 61 on 23 August 2021.

He represented Argentina at the 2020 Summer Olympics, but lost in the tight opening round to Mikhail Kukushkin.

=== 2023–24: ATP final, top 50, finishing five consecutive seasons inside the Top 100 ===
In February 2023, he reached his second ATP final at the 2023 Córdoba Open defeating No. 2 seed Francisco Cerúndolo and the defending champion, No. 3 seed Spaniard Albert Ramos Viñolas en route. He lost in three sets to the No. 4 seed Sebastián Báez in the final. As a result, he moved into the top 50 at world No. 49 on 13 February 2023.

In February 2024, he reached the Córdoba Open semifinals for the third time defeating third seed Tomás Martín Etcheverry. The following week using special exempt (SE) status, he reached back-to-back semifinals at another home tournament from the Golden swing, the 2024 Argentina Open defeating second seed Cameron Norrie, his fourth top-20 win and fifth seed Sebastián Báez.

On 13 November 2024, he participated in the men's doubles event in the Uruguay Open, partnering former football player Diego Forlán. The pair was defeated in the first round by the No. 4 seeds from Bolivia, Boris Arias and Federico Zeballos.

At the end of November, he reached the singles semifinals of 2024 Maia Open in Portugal, where he lost to an eventual champion Damir Džumhur, which enabled him of finishing five seasons in a row inside the Top 100 in the ATP rankings.

== Personal life ==
Federico is the younger brother of Guillermo Coria.

In June 2018, Coria was fined $10,000 and banned for eight months on anti-corruption charges for failing to report a match-fixing attempt in 2015 and for not cooperating with the subsequent investigation.

Coria also runs his own personal YouTube channel where he documents about his travels in tournaments.

== Performance timeline ==
Key
W	F	SF	QF	#R	RR	Q#	DNQ	A	NH

(W) winner; (F) finalist; (SF) semifinalist; (QF) quarterfinalist; (#R) rounds 4, 3, 2, 1; (RR) round-robin stage; (Q#) qualification round; (DNQ) did not qualify; (A) absent; (NH) not held; (SR) strike rate (events won / competed); (W–L) win–loss record.
To avoid confusion and double counting, these charts are updated at the conclusion of a tournament or when the player's participation has ended.

Current through the 2025 French Open.

Tournament	2016	2017	2018	2019	2020	2021	2022	2023	2024	2025	2026	SR	W–L
Grand Slam tournaments
Australian Open	A	A	A	A	Q2	1R	1R	1R	1R	1R	A	0 / 5	0–5
French Open	A	A	A	A	3R	2R	1R	1R	1R	Q2	Q1	0 / 5	3–5
Wimbledon	A	Q1	A	Q1	NH	1R	1R	1R	1R		Q2	0 / 4	0–4
US Open	A	Q1	A	Q1	2R	1R	2R	Q3	1R		Q1	0 / 4	2–4
Win–loss	0–0	0–0	0–0	0–0	3–2	1–4	1–4	0–3	0–4	0–1	0–0	0 / 18	5–18
ATP Masters 1000 tournaments
Indian Wells Masters	A	A	A	A	NH	1R	2R	1R				0 / 3	1–3
Miami Open	A	A	A	A	NH	1R	1R	1R				0 / 3	0–3
Monte-Carlo Masters	A	A	A	A	NH	Q1	A	A	1R			0 / 1	0–1
Madrid Open	A	A	A	A	NH	Q1	Q2	A	Q2			0 / 0	0–0
Italian Open	A	A	A	A	2R	A	Q1	A	Q1			0 / 1	1–1
Canadian Open	A	A	A	A	NH	A	A	A				0 / 0	0–0
Cincinnati Masters	A	A	A	A	Q1	A	A	A				0 / 0	0–0
Shanghai Masters	A	A	A	A	NH			A				0 / 0	0–0
Paris Masters	A	A	A	A	1R	Q1	A	A				0 / 1	0–1
Win–loss	0–0	0–0	0–0	0–0	1–2	0–2	1–2	0–2	0–1	0–0	0–0	0 / 9	2–9
Career statistics
Tournaments	0	0	1	0	9	17	18	13	15	4	1	78	
Overall win–loss	0–0	0–0	1–1	0–0	6–9	16–18	15–18	7–13	8–15	3–4	0–1	41.48%	56–79
Year-end ranking	249	308	279	120	91	63	75	88	100	245	693	$4,068,250	

== ATP Tour finals ==
=== Singles: 2 (2 runner-ups) ===
Legend Grand Slam (0–0) ATP Masters 1000 (0–0) ATP 500 (0–0) ATP 250 (0–2)	Finals by surface Hard (0–0) Clay (0–2) Grass (0–0)	Finals by setting Outdoor (0–2) Indoor (0–0)

Result	W–L	Date	Tournament	Tier	Surface	Opponent	Score
Loss	0–1	Jul 2021	Swedish Open, Sweden	ATP 250	Clay	(Norway) Casper Ruud	3–6, 3–6
Loss	0–2	Feb 2023	Córdoba Open, Argentina	ATP 250	Clay	(Argentina) Sebastián Báez	1–6, 6–3, 3–6

== ATP Challenger Tour finals ==
=== Singles: 15 (6 titles, 9 runner-ups) ===
Legend ATP Challenger Tour (6–9)	Finals by surface Hard (0–0) Clay (6–9)

Result	W–L	Date	Tournament	Tier	Surface	Opponent	Score
Win	1–0	May 2019	Savannah, USA	Challenger	Clay (green)	(Italy) Paolo Lorenzi	6–3, 4–6, 6–2
Loss	1–1	June 2019	Almaty, Kazakhstan	Challenger	Clay	(Italy) Lorenzo Giustino	4–6, 4–6
Loss	1–2	Oct 2019	Santo Domingo, Dominican Republic	Challenger	Clay	(Peru) Juan Pablo Varillas	3–6, 6–2, 2–6
Loss	1–3	Oct 2019	Lima, Peru	Challenger	Clay	(Brazil) Thiago Monteiro	2–6, 7–6^{(9–7)}, 4–6
Win	2–3	Jun 2021	Prostějov, Czech Republic	Challenger	Clay	(Slovakia) Alex Molčan	7–6^{(7–1)}, 6–3
Loss	2–4	Jun 2021	Milan, Italy	Challenger	Clay	(Italy) Gian Marco Moroni	3–6, 2–6
Loss	2–5	Jun 2021	Salzburg, Austria	Challenger	Clay	(Argentina) Facundo Bagnis	4–6, 6–3, 2–6
Win	3–5	Nov 2021	Brasília, Brazil	Challenger	Clay	(Spain) Jaume Munar	7–5, 6–3
Win	4–5	Jun 2022	Milan, Italy	Challenger	Clay	(Italy) Francesco Passaro	7–6^{(7–2)}, 6–4
Loss	4–6	Oct 2022	Guayaquil, Ecuador	Challenger	Clay	(Germany) Daniel Altmaier	2–6, 4–6
Win	5–6	Jan 2023	Concepción, Chile	Challenger	Clay	(Kazakhstan) Timofey Skatov	6–4, 6–3
Win	6–6	Sep 2023	Szczecin, Poland	Challenger	Clay	(Czech Republic) Vít Kopřiva	6–1, 7–6^{(7–4)}
Loss	6–7	Oct 2023	Buenos Aires, Argentina	Challenger	Clay	(Argentina) Mariano Navone	6–2, 3–6, 4–6
Loss	6–8	Jan 2024	Piracicaba, Brazil	Challenger	Clay	(Argentina) Camilo Ugo Carabelli	5–7, 4–6
Loss	6–9	Sep 2024	Buenos Aires, Argentina	Challenger	Clay	(Argentina) Francisco Comesaña	6–1, 6–7^{(7–9)}, 4–6

=== Doubles: 1 (1 title) ===
Legend ATP Challenger Tour (1–0)

Result	W–L	Date	Tournament	Tier	Surface	Partner	Opponents	Score
Win	1–0	Oct 2016	Campinas, Brazil	Challenger	Clay	(Argentina) Tomás Lipovšek Puches	(Peru) Sergio Galdós (Argentina) Máximo González	7–5, 6–2

== ITF Futures finals ==
=== Singles: 20 (9 titles, 11 runner-ups) ===
Legend ITF Futures (9–11)	Finals by surface Hard (0–0) Clay (9–11)

Result	W–L	Date	Tournament	Tier	Surface	Opponent	Score
Win	1–0	Apr 2012	Argentina F8, Neuquén	Futures	Clay	(Peru) Sergio Galdós	4–6, 6–1, 7–6^{(8–6)}
Win	2–0	May 2013	Argentina F6, Río Cuarto	Futures	Clay	(Chile) Ricardo Urzúa Rivera	6–4, 6–4
Win	3–0	Jun 2013	Argentina F8, Arroyito	Futures	Clay	(Brazil) Thales Turini	6–3, 6–2
Loss	3–1	Mar 2014	Peru F1, Lima	Futures	Clay	(Brazil) Fabiano de Paula	1–6, 1–6
Loss	3–2	Mar 2014	Peru F2, Lima	Futures	Clay	(Spain) Marcos Giraldi Requena	1–6, 0–6
Loss	3–3	Sep 2014	Argentina F16, Santiago del Estero	Futures	Clay	(Argentina) Nicolás Kicker	3–6, 0–6
Loss	3–4	Sep 2014	Argentina F17, Villa del Dique	Futures	Clay	(Argentina) Nicolás Kicker	5–7, 1–6
Win	4–4	Sep 2014	Argentina F18, Buenos Aires	Futures	Clay	(Argentina) Juan Ignacio Ameal	6–2, 3–6, 7–6^{(7–4)}
Loss	4–5	Feb 2015	USA F7, Sunrise	Futures	Clay	(Italy) Gianluigi Quinzi	4–6, 4–6
Loss	4–6	Mar 2015	Argentina F3, Olavarría	Futures	Clay	(Dominican Republic) José Hernández-Fernández	0–6, 1–6
Loss	4–7	May 2015	Argentina F6, Villa del Dique	Futures	Clay	(Argentina) Juan Ignacio Galarza	4–6, 2–6
Loss	4–8	Aug 2015	Switzerland F4, Sion	Futures	Clay	(Canada) Steven Diez	7–5, 5–7, 1–6
Loss	4–9	May 2016	Argentina F6, Villa del Dique	Futures	Clay	(Brazil) Marcelo Zormann	4–6, 6–7^{(5–7)}
Loss	4–10	Jul 2016	Germany F7, Trier	Futures	Clay	(Germany) Maximilian Marterer	1–6, 2–6
Loss	4–11	Jul 2016	Italy F21, Gubbio	Futures	Clay	(Italy) Andrea Pellegrino	5–7, 1–6
Win	5–11	Oct 2016	Argentina F11, San Juan	Futures	Clay	(Sweden) Christian Lindell	4–6, 7–6^{(7–1)}, 7–6^{(7–0)}
Win	6–11	Nov 2016	Argentina F12, Buenos Aires	Futures	Clay	(Argentina) Matías Zukas	6–4, 6–2
Win	7–11	Nov 2016	Argentina F13, Villa del Dique	Futures	Clay	(Argentina) Tomás Lipovšek Puches	3–6, 6–1, 6–4
Win	8–11	Nov 2016	Bolivia F3, Santa Cruz de la Sierra	Futures	Clay	(Brazil) Caio Zampieri	6–4, 6–4
Win	9–11	Aug 2018	Romania F9, Pitești	Futures	Clay	(Colombia) Cristian Rodríguez	7–5, 6–2

=== Doubles: 21 (6 titles, 15 runner-ups) ===
Legend ITF Futures (6–15)	Finals by surface Hard (0–0) Clay (6–15)

Result	W–L	Date	Tournament	Tier	Surface	Partner	Opponents	Score
Loss	0–1	Jul 2010	Argentina F14, Rafaela	Futures	Clay	(Argentina) Facundo Argüello	(Argentina) Andrés Molteni (Argentina) Diego Schwartzman	3–6, 4–6
Loss	0–2	Jun 2011	Argentina F6, Posadas	Futures	Clay	(Argentina) Renzo Olivo	(Argentina) Guillermo Durán (Argentina) Joaquín–Jesús Monteferrario	4–6, 6–7^{(4–7)}
Loss	0–3	Jul 2011	Chile F5, Iquique	Futures	Clay	(Argentina) Facundo Mena	(Argentina) Patricio Heras (Argentina) Gustavo Sterin	4–6, 6–7^{(4–7)}
Win	1–3	Nov 2011	Chile F11, Concepción	Futures	Clay	(Argentina) Gabriel Alejandro Hidalgo	(Chile) Gonzalo Lama (Chile) Cristóbal Saavedra Corvalán	3–6, 7–6^{(8–6)}, [10–7]
Win	2–3	Nov 2011	Chile F12, Temuco	Futures	Clay	(Argentina) Gabriel Alejandro Hidalgo	(Italy) Filippo Leonardi (Italy) Giulio Torroni	6–2, 7–5
Loss	2–4	Jun 2012	Chile F7, Concón	Futures	Clay	(Argentina) Sebastián Decoud	(Chile) Jorge Aguilar (Chile) Juan Carlos Sáez	1–6, 2–6
Loss	2–5	Jun 2012	Argentina F15, Resistencia	Futures	Clay	(Argentina) Gabriel Alejandro Hidalgo	(Argentina) Andrés Molteni (Argentina) Juan Vázquez–Valenzuela	4–6, 6–4, [5–10]
Loss	2–6	Sep 2012	Argentina F22, Santiago del Estero	Futures	Clay	(Argentina) Valentín Florez	(Bolivia) Hugo Dellien (Argentina) Mateo Nicolás Martínez	7–6^{(9–7)}, 1–6, [6–10]
Win	3–6	Mar 2014	Peru F2, Lima	Futures	Clay	(Spain) Marc Giner	(Bolivia) Alejandro Mendoza (Peru) Duilio Vallebuona	6–2, 3–6, [10–5]
Loss	3–7	Apr 2014	Peru F3, Lima	Futures	Clay	(Spain) Marc Giner	(Brazil) Fabiano de Paula (Argentina) Gastón–Arturo Grimolizzi	6–2, 4–6, [5–10]
Loss	3–8	Jun 2014	France F12, Toulon	Futures	Clay	(Argentina) Dante Gennaro	(France) Yanais Laurent (France) Constant Lestienne	6–3, 3–6, [4–10]
Loss	3–9	Aug 2014	Argentina F12, Corrientes	Futures	Clay	(Argentina) Juan Ignacio Galarza	(Argentina) Tomás Lipovšek Puches (Japan) Ryusei Makiguchi	6–4, 3–6, [5–10]
Win	4–9	Sep 2014	Argentina F17, Villa del Dique	Futures	Clay	(Argentina) Gabriel Alejandro Hidalgo	(Brazil) Oscar José Gutierrez (Argentina) Eduardo Agustín Torre	6–4, 6–1
Loss	4–10	Mar 2015	Argentina F2, Mendoza	Futures	Clay	(Argentina) Francisco Bahamonde	(Argentina) Juan Ignacio Galarza (Argentina) Tomás Lipovšek Puches	6–4, 2–6, [8–10]
Loss	4–11	Jul 2015	Austria F2, Kramsach	Futures	Clay	(Chile) Cristóbal Saavedra Corvalán	(Austria) Lucas Miedler (Austria) Maximilian Neuchrist	6–4, 2–6, [8–10]
Loss	4–12	Aug 2015	Switzerland F4, Sion	Futures	Clay	(Switzerland) Siméon Rossier	(France) Hugo Nys (France) Tak Khunn Wang	2–6, 2–6
Loss	4–13	Jun 2016	Argentina F9, Buenos Aires	Futures	Clay	(Argentina) Maximiliano Estévez	(Argentina) Gabriel Alejandro Hidalgo (Argentina) Eduardo Agustín Torre	4–6, 3–6
Loss	4–14	Aug 2016	Switzerland F4, Lausanne	Futures	Clay	(Switzerland) Louroi Martinez	(Portugal) Gonçalo Oliveira (France) Fabien Reboul	5–7, 2–6
Loss	4–15	Sep 2016	Switzerland F5, Sion	Futures	Clay	(Switzerland) Louroi Martinez	(Portugal) Gonçalo Oliveira (France) Fabien Reboul	3–6, 3–6
Win	5–15	Nov 2016	Argentina F13, Villa del Dique	Futures	Clay	(Argentina) Tomás Lipovšek Puches	(Chile) Cristóbal Saavedra Corvalán (Chile) Ricardo Urzúa Rivera	7–6^{(10–8)}, 6–0
Win	6–15	Jul 2017	Italy F21, Casinalbo	Futures	Clay	(Brazil) Bruno Sant'Anna	(Italy) Enrico Dalla Valle (Italy) Andrea Pellegrino	6–3, 4–6, [10–8]
