= 2022 Challenger di Roseto degli Abruzzi II – Doubles =

Doubles
- 2022 Challenger di Roseto degli Abruzzi II

Final
- Champions: (Italy) Franco Agamenone (France) Manuel Guinard
- Runners-up: (Serbia) Ivan Sabanov (Serbia) Matej Sabanov
- Score: 7–6^{(7–2)}, 7–6^{(7–3)}

Events
Singles	Doubles
← 2022 ·	Challenger di Roseto degli Abruzzi	· 2023 →

Hugo Nys and Jan Zieliński were the defending champions but chose not to defend their title.

Franco Agamenone and Manuel Guinard won the title after defeating Ivan and Matej Sabanov 7–6^{(7–2)}, 7–6^{(7–3)} in the final.

== Seeds ==
1. (Netherlands) Robin Haase / (Italy) Andrea Vavassori (first round)
2. (Czech Republic) Roman Jebavý / (Austria) Philipp Oswald (first round)
3. (Serbia) Ivan Sabanov / (Serbia) Matej Sabanov (final)
4. (Monaco) Romain Arneodo / (Poland) Szymon Walków (quarterfinals)

== Draw ==
=== Key ===
- Q = Qualifier
- WC = Wild card
- LL = Lucky loser
- Alt = Alternate
- SE = Special exempt
- PR = Protected ranking
- ITF = ITF entry
- JE = Junior exempt
- w/o = Walkover
- r = Retired
- d = Defaulted
- SR = Special ranking

First round
1	(Netherlands) R Haase (Italy) A Vavassori	4	4
(Italy) F Gaio (Italy) A Pellegrino	6	6
(Portugal) F Cabral (Spain) D Vega Hernández	6	6
(United States) J Cerretani (Croatia) N Serdarušić	2	2
4	(Monaco) R Arneodo (Poland) S Walków	6	6
(Italy) R Brancaccio (Italy) F Cobolli	2	4
(Italy) F Agamenone (France) M Guinard	6	6
WC	(Italy) Andrea Del Federico (Italy) G Ricca	2	2
WC	(Italy) F Maestrelli (Italy) G Zeppieri	6	6^{2}	[6]
(Italy) M Bortolotti (Italy) L Darderi	4	7^{7}	[10]
(Netherlands) S Arends (Netherlands) D Pel	5	7	[8]
3	(Serbia) I Sabanov (Serbia) M Sabanov	7	5	[10]
(Slovakia) A Martin (Austria) T-S Weissborn	6^{4}	6	[10]
(India) D Sharan (Chinese Taipei) C-h Tseng	7^{7}	2	[2]
(India) J Nedunchezhiyan (India) R Ramanathan	6	6^{1}	[10]
2	(Czech Republic) R Jebavý (Austria) P Oswald	4	7^{7}	[4]

Quarterfinals
(Italy) F Gaio (Italy) A Pellegrino	6	4	[10]
(Portugal) F Cabral (Spain) D Vega Hernández	4	6	[8]
4	(Monaco) R Arneodo (Poland) S Walków	6	3	[7]
(Italy) F Agamenone (France) M Guinard	1	6	[10]
(Italy) M Bortolotti (Italy) L Darderi	2	5
3	(Serbia) I Sabanov (Serbia) M Sabanov	6	7
(Slovakia) A Martin (Austria) T-S Weissborn	6	6
(India) J Nedunchezhiyan (India) R Ramanathan	4	4

Semifinals
(Italy) F Gaio (Italy) A Pellegrino	4	6	[5]
(Italy) F Agamenone (France) M Guinard	6	4	[10]
3	(Serbia) I Sabanov (Serbia) M Sabanov	7	6
(Slovakia) A Martin (Austria) T-S Weissborn	5	4

Final
(Italy) F Agamenone (France) M Guinard	7^{7}	7^{7}
3	(Serbia) I Sabanov (Serbia) M Sabanov	6^{2}	6^{3}
