= 2022 Challenger di Roseto degli Abruzzi II – Singles =

Singles
- 2022 Challenger di Roseto degli Abruzzi II

Final
- Champion: (France) Manuel Guinard
- Runner-up: (Chinese Taipei) Tseng Chun-hsin
- Score: 6–1, 6–2

Events
Singles	Doubles
← 2022 ·	Challenger di Roseto degli Abruzzi	· 2023 →

Carlos Taberner was the defending champion but lost in the quarterfinals to Tseng Chun-hsin.

Manuel Guinard won the title after defeating Tseng 6–1, 6–2 in the final.

== Seeds ==
1. (Czech Republic) Jiří Veselý (first round)
2. (Italy) Gianluca Mager (first round)
3. (Spain) Carlos Taberner (quarterfinals)
4. (France) Corentin Moutet (withdrew)
5. (Spain) Bernabé Zapata Miralles (first round, retired)
6. (Serbia) Nikola Milojević (first round)
7. (Slovakia) Andrej Martin (first round)
8. (Chinese Taipei) Tseng Chun-hsin (final)

== Draw ==
=== Key ===
- Q = Qualifier
- WC = Wild card
- LL = Lucky loser
- Alt = Alternate
- SE = Special exempt
- PR = Protected ranking
- ITF = ITF entry
- JE = Junior exempt
- w/o = Walkover
- r = Retired
- d = Defaulted
- SR = Special ranking

=== Finals ===
Semifinals
(Kazakhstan) Timofey Skatov	5	6	6^{6}
8	(Chinese Taipei) Tseng Chun-hsin	7	2	7^{8}
Alt	(France) Manuel Guinard	7	6
(Italy) Alessandro Giannessi	5	1

Final
8	(Chinese Taipei) Tseng Chun-hsin	1	2
Alt	(France) Manuel Guinard	6	6

=== Top half ===
First round
1	(Czech Republic) J Veselý	2	2
Alt	(Croatia) N Serdarušić	6	6
WC	(Italy) F Cobolli	6	6
(Italy) F Gaio	3	4
(Kazakhstan) T Skatov	6	6
WC	(Italy) Andrea Del Federico	3	1
(Portugal) G Elias	6	2
5	(Spain) B Zapata Miralles	3	0^{r}
3	(Spain) C Taberner	6	6
WC	(Italy) G Zeppieri	4	2
Q	(Spain) C Gimeno Valero	7	6^{4}	7
(Belgium) K Coppejans	5	7^{7}	5
(Italy) F Agamenone	5	7	6
(Italy) L Giustino	7	5	4
Alt	(France) M Bourgue	6^{2}	6^{4}
8	(Chinese Taipei) C-h Tseng	7^{7}	7^{7}

Second round
Alt	(Croatia) N Serdarušić	6	6^{5}	7
WC	(Italy) F Cobolli	3	7^{7}	5
(Kazakhstan) T Skatov	6	0	7
(Portugal) G Elias	2	6	5
3	(Spain) C Taberner	7^{7}	6
Q	(Spain) C Gimeno Valero	6^{3}	3
(Italy) F Agamenone	4	4
8	(Chinese Taipei) C-h Tseng	6	6

Quarterfinals
Alt	(Croatia) N Serdarušić	4	6^{5}
(Kazakhstan) T Skatov	6	7^{7}
3	(Spain) C Taberner	4	4
8	(Chinese Taipei) C-h Tseng	6	6

Semifinals
(Kazakhstan) T Skatov	5	6	6^{6}
8	(Chinese Taipei) C-h Tseng	7	2	7^{8}

=== Bottom half ===
First round
6	(Serbia) N Milojević	3	5
Alt	(France) M Guinard	6	7
Alt	(Canada) B Schnur	6	2	3
Q	(France) Alexis Gautier	4	6	6
(Slovakia) J Kovalík	6	6^{4}	6
(Portugal) N Borges	1	7^{7}	4
LL	(Netherlands) R Haase	6	6
Q	(Germany) L Wessels	2	4
7	(Slovakia) A Martin	6	3	5
Q	(Hungary) Z Piros	4	6	7
Q	(Italy) A Vavassori	7^{7}	6
Q	(Italy) L Darderi	6^{4}	1
(Italy) A Giannessi	3	6	6
LL	(Spain) N Álvarez Varona	6	1	3
(Italy) A Pellegrino	6	6
2	(Italy) G Mager	4	3

Second round
Alt	(France) M Guinard	6	6
Q	(France) A Gautier	1	0
(Slovakia) J Kovalík	6	6
LL	(Netherlands) R Haase	4	2
Q	(Hungary) Z Piros	5	6	6
Q	(Italy) A Vavassori	7	4	0
(Italy) A Giannessi	6	6
(Italy) A Pellegrino	4	2

Quarterfinals
Alt	(France) M Guinard	6	6
(Slovakia) J Kovalík	1	3
Q	(Hungary) Z Piros	2	5
(Italy) A Giannessi	6	7

Semifinals
Alt	(France) M Guinard	7	6
(Italy) A Giannessi	5	1
