= 2026 Cattolica Challenger – Doubles =

Doubles
- 2026 Cattolica Challenger

Final
- Champions: (Romania) Alexandru Jecan (Romania) Bogdan Pavel
- Runners-up: (Sweden) Erik Grevelius (Sweden) Adam Heinonen
- Score: 7–6^{(12–10)}, 6–4

Events
Singles	Doubles
- Cattolica Challenger

This was the first edition of the tournament.

Alexandru Jecan and Bogdan Pavel won the title after defeating Erik Grevelius and Adam Heinonen 7–6^{(12–10)}, 6–4 in the final.

== Seeds ==
1. (Romania) Alexandru Jecan / (Romania) Bogdan Pavel (champions)
2. (India) Arjun Kadhe / (Brazil) Marcelo Zormann (first round)
3. (Romania) Victor Vlad Cornea / (Israel) Daniel Cukierman (semifinals)
4. (Sweden) Erik Grevelius / (Sweden) Adam Heinonen (final)

== Draw ==
Key

- Q = Qualifier
- WC = Wild card
- LL = Lucky loser
- Alt = Alternate
- ITF = ITF entry
- PR = Protected ranking
- SR = Special ranking
- SE = Special exempt
- JE = Junior exempt
- JR = Junior Accelerator Programme entrant
- CO = College Accelerator Programme entrant
- NG = Next Gen Accelerator Program entrant
- w/o = Walkover
- r = Retired
- d = Defaulted

First round
1	(Romania) A Jecan (Romania) B Pavel	6	6
WC	(Italy) Mattia Logrippo (Italy) Pietro Ricci	2	4
(Italy) F Bondioli (Italy) R Brancaccio	6	7^{8}
WC	(Italy) E Dalla Valle (Italy) Michele Mecarelli	2	6^{6}
3	(Romania) V Cornea (Israel) D Cukierman	3	7	[10]
(Bulgaria) A Genov (United Kingdom) M Whitehouse	6	5	[8]
(Italy) Simone Agostini (Australia) Ethan Cook	3	3
(Spain) R Carballés Baena (Spain) S Martos Gornés	6	6
(Italy) F Forti (Italy) G Ricca	6	6^{3}	[10]
(United Kingdom) L Broady; I Simakin	4	7^{7}	[8]
(Croatia) A Kalender (Serbia) I Sabanov	5	4
4	(Sweden) E Grevelius (Sweden) A Heinonen	7	6
(Peru) G Bueno (Ecuador) Á Guillén Meza	6	6
PR	(India) A Kalyanpur (Australia) J Taylor	1	2
(Netherlands) J de Jong (Netherlands) M Hermans	6	7^{7}
2	(India) A Kadhe (Brazil) M Zormann	1	6^{5}

Quarterfinals
1	(Romania) A Jecan (Romania) B Pavel	7	6
(Italy) F Bondioli (Italy) R Brancaccio	5	2
3	(Romania) V Cornea (Israel) D Cukierman	6	6
(Spain) R Carballés Baena (Spain) S Martos Gornés	3	2
(Italy) F Forti (Italy) G Ricca	2	1
4	(Sweden) E Grevelius (Sweden) A Heinonen	6	6
(Peru) G Bueno (Ecuador) Á Guillén Meza
(Netherlands) J de Jong (Netherlands) M Hermans	w/o

Semifinals
1	(Romania) A Jecan (Romania) B Pavel	6	6
3	(Romania) V Cornea (Israel) D Cukierman	4	4
4	(Sweden) E Grevelius (Sweden) A Heinonen	7^{7}	7^{7}
(Netherlands) J de Jong (Netherlands) M Hermans	6^{4}	6^{4}

Final
1	(Romania) A Jecan (Romania) B Pavel	7^{12}	6
4	(Sweden) E Grevelius (Sweden) A Heinonen	6^{10}	4
