= 2021 Lošinj Open – Doubles =

Doubles
- 2021 Lošinj Open

Final
- Champions: (Slovakia) Andrej Martin (Austria) Tristan-Samuel Weissborn
- Runners-up: (Romania) Victor Vlad Cornea (Turkey) Ergi Kırkın
- Score: 6–1, 7–6^{(7–5)}

Events
Singles	Doubles
- Lošinj Open

This was the first edition of the tournament.

Andrej Martin and Tristan-Samuel Weissborn won the title after defeating Victor Vlad Cornea and Ergi Kırkın 6–1, 7–6^{(7–5)} in the final.

== Seeds ==
1. (France) Sadio Doumbia / (France) Fabien Reboul (quarterfinals)
2. (Croatia) Antonio Šančić / (New Zealand) Artem Sitak (semifinals)
3. (Italy) Marco Bortolotti / (Spain) Sergio Martos Gornés (first round)
4. (United States) James Cerretani / (Germany) Fabian Fallert (semifinals)

== Draw ==
Key

- Q = Qualifier
- WC = Wild card
- LL = Lucky loser
- Alt = Alternate
- ITF = ITF entry
- PR = Protected ranking
- SR = Special ranking
- SE = Special exempt
- JE = Junior exempt
- JR = Junior Accelerator Programme entrant
- CO = College Accelerator Programme entrant
- NG = Next Gen Accelerator Program entrant
- w/o = Walkover
- r = Retired
- d = Defaulted

First round
1	(France) S Doumbia (France) F Reboul	7	6
(Czech Republic) J Forejtek (Romania) FC Jianu	5	4
(Spain) J Barranco Cosano (Spain) Á López San Martín	3	5
(Slovakia) A Martin (Austria) T-S Weissborn	6	7
4	(United States) J Cerretani (Germany) F Fallert	3	7^{7}	[10]
(Serbia) D Petrović (Croatia) I Sabanov	6	6^{5}	[3]
WC	(Croatia) A Kalender (Croatia) M Poljičak	2	7^{7}	[5]
WC	(India) A Chandrasekar (India) VS Prashanth	6	6^{3}	[10]
(Bosnia and Herzegovina) N Fatić (Bosnia and Herzegovina) A Šetkić	1	2
(Romania) VV Cornea (Turkey) E Kırkın	6	6
(France) G Blancaneaux (India) A Kadhe	6	7
3	(Italy) M Bortolotti (Spain) S Martos Gornés	2	5
(Netherlands) R Haase (Netherlands) M Hermans	6	6
WC	(Bulgaria) A Genov (Sweden) Eldin Nokic	4	4
(Spain) N Álvarez Varona (Ukraine) G Kravchenko	6^{3}	1
2	(Croatia) A Šančić (New Zealand) A Sitak	7^{7}	6

Quarterfinals
1	(France) S Doumbia (France) F Reboul	2	3
(Slovakia) A Martin (Austria) T-S Weissborn	6	6
4	(United States) J Cerretani (Germany) F Fallert	7	6
WC	(India) A Chandrasekar (India) VS Prashanth	5	3
(Romania) VV Cornea (Turkey) E Kırkın	6	1	[10]
(France) G Blancaneaux (India) A Kadhe	3	6	[4]
(Netherlands) R Haase (Netherlands) M Hermans	5	4
2	(Croatia) A Šančić (New Zealand) A Sitak	7	6

Semifinals
(Slovakia) A Martin (Austria) T-S Weissborn	6	6
4	(United States) J Cerretani (Germany) F Fallert	3	4
(Romania) VV Cornea (Turkey) E Kırkın	0	6	[10]
2	(Croatia) A Šančić (New Zealand) A Sitak	6	0	[5]

Final
(Slovakia) A Martin (Austria) T-S Weissborn	6	7^{7}
(Romania) VV Cornea (Turkey) E Kırkın	1	6^{5}
