= 2021 Lošinj Open =

- Date: 18–24 October
- Edition: 1st
- Surface: Clay
- Location: Veli Lošinj, Croatia
- Venue: Ljubicic Tennis Academy, Croatia

Champions

Singles
- (Spain) Carlos Taberner

Doubles
- (Slovakia) Andrej Martin / (Austria) Tristan-Samuel Weissborn
- Lošinj Open

The 2021 Lošinj Open was a professional tennis tournament played on clay courts. It was the first edition of the tournament which was part of the 2021 ATP Challenger Tour. It took place in Veli Lošinj, Croatia between 18 and 24 October 2021.

== Singles main-draw entrants ==
=== Seeds ===
Country	Player	Rank^{1}	Seed
ITA	Marco Cecchinato	82	1
ESP	Carlos Taberner	116	2
SVK	Andrej Martin	120	3
SRB	Nikola Milojević	136	4
SLO	Blaž Rola	177	5
ITA	Alessandro Giannessi	185	6
GBR	Jay Clarke	195	7
FRA	Mathias Bourgue	201	8

- ^{1} Rankings are as of 4 October 2021.

=== Other entrants ===
The following players received wildcards into the singles main draw:

- (Romania) Victor Vlad Cornea
- (Bulgaria) Anthony Genov
- (Croatia) Mili Poljičak

The following players received entry into the singles main draw as alternates:

- (Italy) Raúl Brancaccio
- (Spain) Álvaro López San Martín
- (Bosnia and Herzegovina) Aldin Šetkić

The following players received entry from the qualifying draw:

- (Spain) Nicolás Álvarez Varona
- (India) Arjun Kadhe
- (Ukraine) Georgii Kravchenko
- (Austria) Filip Misolic

== Champions ==
=== Singles ===
- (Spain) Carlos Taberner def. (Italy) Marco Cecchinato Walkover.

=== Doubles ===
- (Slovakia) Andrej Martin / (Austria) Tristan-Samuel Weissborn def. (Romania) Victor Vlad Cornea / (Turkey) Ergi Kırkın 6–1, 7–6^{(7–5)}.
