= 2022 Challenger di Roseto degli Abruzzi – Doubles =

Doubles
- 2022 Challenger di Roseto degli Abruzzi

Final
- Champions: (Monaco) Hugo Nys (Poland) Jan Zieliński
- Runners-up: (Czech Republic) Roman Jebavý (Austria) Philipp Oswald
- Score: 7–6^{(7–2)}, 4–6, [10–3]

Events
Singles	Doubles
- Challenger di Roseto degli Abruzzi

This was the first edition of the tournament.

Hugo Nys and Jan Zieliński won the title after defeating Roman Jebavý and Philipp Oswald 7–6^{(7–2)}, 4–6, [10–3] in the final.

== Seeds ==
1. (Monaco) Hugo Nys / (Poland) Jan Zieliński (champions)
2. (Czech Republic) Roman Jebavý / (Austria) Philipp Oswald (final)
3. (Serbia) Ivan Sabanov / (Serbia) Matej Sabanov (semifinals)
4. (Portugal) Francisco Cabral / (Spain) David Vega Hernández (quarterfinals)

== Draw ==
Key

- Q = Qualifier
- WC = Wild card
- LL = Lucky loser
- Alt = Alternate
- ITF = ITF entry
- PR = Protected ranking
- SR = Special ranking
- SE = Special exempt
- JE = Junior exempt
- JR = Junior Accelerator Programme entrant
- CO = College Accelerator Programme entrant
- NG = Next Gen Accelerator Program entrant
- w/o = Walkover
- r = Retired
- d = Defaulted

First round
1	(Monaco) H Nys (Poland) J Zieliński	6	7
WC	(Italy) F Maestrelli (Italy) G Piraino	2	5
(Slovakia) A Martin (Austria) T-S Weissborn	6	7^{8}
(Poland) K Drzewiecki (India) J Nedunchezhiyan	3	6^{6}
(Slovakia) J Kovalík (Czech Republic) L Rosol	6	6
(United States) J Cerretani (Croatia) N Serdarušić	4	4
Alt	(Italy) M Arnaldi (Italy) L Darderi	6	7^{8}
(Spain) C Taberner (Spain) B Zapata Miralles	2	6^{6}
(Italy) F Gaio (Italy) A Pellegrino	5	3
3	(Serbia) I Sabanov (Serbia) M Sabanov	7	6
WC	(Italy) Andrea Del Federico (Italy) G Ricca	4	6	[10]
(India) S Balaji (India) D Sharan	6	2	[7]
(Portugal) J Domingues (Italy) A Giannessi	0	6	[2]
2	(Czech Republic) R Jebavý (Austria) P Oswald	6	3	[10]

Quarterfinals
1	(Monaco) H Nys (Poland) J Zieliński	7	6
(Slovakia) A Martin (Austria) T-S Weissborn	5	4
4	(Portugal) F Cabral (Spain) D Vega Hernández	6	4	[7]
(Slovakia) J Kovalík (Czech Republic) L Rosol	3	6	[10]
Alt	(Italy) M Arnaldi (Italy) L Darderi	4	4
3	(Serbia) I Sabanov (Serbia) M Sabanov	6	6
WC	(Italy) A Del Federico (Italy) G Ricca	2	3
2	(Czech Republic) R Jebavý (Austria) P Oswald	6	6

Semifinals
1	(Monaco) H Nys (Poland) J Zieliński	7^{10}	7
(Slovakia) J Kovalík (Czech Republic) L Rosol	6^{8}	5
3	(Serbia) I Sabanov (Serbia) M Sabanov	3	7	[6]
2	(Czech Republic) R Jebavý (Austria) P Oswald	6	5	[10]

Final
1	(Monaco) H Nys (Poland) J Zieliński	7^{7}	4	[10]
2	(Czech Republic) R Jebavý (Austria) P Oswald	6^{2}	6	[3]
