= 2023 Challenger di Roseto degli Abruzzi – Singles =

Singles
- 2023 Challenger di Roseto degli Abruzzi

Final
- Champion: (Austria) Filip Misolic
- Runner-up: (Belgium) Raphaël Collignon
- Score: 4–6, 7–5, 7–6^{(8–6)}

Events
Singles	Doubles
- Challenger di Roseto degli Abruzzi

Manuel Guinard was the defending champion but chose not to defend his title.

Filip Misolic won the title after defeating Raphaël Collignon 4–6, 7–5, 7–6^{(8–6)} in the final.

== Seeds ==
1. (Austria) Filip Misolic (champion)
2. (Italy) Franco Agamenone (quarterfinals)
3. (Netherlands) Jelle Sels (second round)
4. (United States) Emilio Nava (second round)
5. (Italy) Andrea Pellegrino (quarterfinals)
6. (Czech Republic) Dalibor Svrčina (semifinals)
7. (Romania) Nicholas David Ionel (semifinals)
8. (Belgium) Gauthier Onclin (quarterfinals)

== Draw ==
Key

- Q = Qualifier
- WC = Wild card
- LL = Lucky loser
- Alt = Alternate
- ITF = ITF entry
- PR = Protected ranking
- SR = Special ranking
- SE = Special exempt
- JE = Junior exempt
- JR = Junior Accelerator Programme entrant
- CO = College Accelerator Programme entrant
- NG = Next Gen Accelerator Program entrant
- w/o = Walkover
- r = Retired
- d = Defaulted

=== Finals ===
Semifinals
1	(Austria) Filip Misolic	6	7^{7}
6	(Czech Republic) Dalibor Svrčina	3	6^{3}
(Belgium) Raphaël Collignon	1	6	6
7	(Romania) Nicholas David Ionel	6	4	1

Final
1	(Austria) Filip Misolic	4	7	7^{8}
(Belgium) Raphaël Collignon	6	5	6^{6}

=== Top half ===
First round
1	(Austria) F Misolic	6	6
(Argentina) JB Torres	1	1
(Italy) G Mager	6	6
Alt	(Serbia) N Milojević	1	2
(France) D Added	4	1
Alt	(Italy) S Caruso	6	6
(Hungary) M Valkusz	5	2
5	(Italy) A Pellegrino	7	6
3	(Netherlands) J Sels	7^{7}	2	6
WC	(Italy) G Ferrari	6^{3}	6	3
(Netherlands) J de Jong	2	6	7
Q	(Italy) G Piraino	6	3	5
(Argentina) S Rodríguez Taverna	6	6
Q	(Turkey) E Kırkın	4	0
(Poland) K Żuk	5	0
6	(Czech Republic) D Svrčina	7	6

Second round
1	(Austria) F Misolic	7	6
(Italy) G Mager	5	2
Alt	(Italy) S Caruso	6^{4}	3
5	(Italy) A Pellegrino	7^{7}	6
3	(Netherlands) J Sels	0	0
(Netherlands) J de Jong	6	6
(Argentina) S Rodríguez Taverna	4	5
6	(Czech Republic) D Svrčina	6	7

Quarterfinals
1	(Austria) F Misolic	6	4	6
5	(Italy) A Pellegrino	1	6	4
(Netherlands) J de Jong	4	4
6	(Czech Republic) D Svrčina	6	6

Semifinals
1	(Austria) F Misolic	6	7^{7}
6	(Czech Republic) D Svrčina	3	6^{3}

=== Bottom half ===
First round
8	(Belgium) G Onclin	7	5	6
(Croatia) N Serdarušić	5	7	4
WC	(Italy) F Forti	7^{7}	6
WC	(Italy) G Fonio	6^{4}	2
Alt	(Ukraine) I Marchenko	7^{7}	2	2
(Belgium) R Collignon	6^{5}	6	6
(France) T Droguet	4	6	0
4	(United States) Em Nava	6	2	6
7	(Romania) ND Ionel	7	4
Q	(Italy) Edoardo Lavagno	5	4^{r}
Q	(Italy) J Berrettini	3	0
Q	(India) S Nagal	6	6
(Argentina) M Navone	6^{5}	0
(Switzerland) K Feldbausch	7^{7}	6
Q	(Italy) GM Moroni	3	5
2	(Italy) F Agamenone	6	7

Second round
8	(Belgium) G Onclin	6	1	6
WC	(Italy) F Forti	4	6	3
(Belgium) R Collignon	6	6
4	(United States) Em Nava	3	2
7	(Romania) ND Ionel	7	7^{8}
Q	(India) S Nagal	5	6^{6}
(Switzerland) K Feldbausch	0	1
2	(Italy) F Agamenone	6	6

Quarterfinals
8	(Belgium) G Onclin	7	4	2
(Belgium) R Collignon	5	6	6
7	(Romania) ND Ionel	6	6
2	(Italy) F Agamenone	4	2

Semifinals
(Belgium) R Collignon	1	6	6
7	(Romania) ND Ionel	6	4	1
