= 2021 Lošinj Open – Singles =

Singles
- 2021 Lošinj Open

Final
- Champion: (Spain) Carlos Taberner
- Runner-up: (Italy) Marco Cecchinato
- Score: Walkover

Events
Singles	Doubles
- Lošinj Open

This was the first edition of the tournament.

Carlos Taberner won the title by walkover after Marco Cecchinato withdrew before the final.

== Seeds ==
1. (Italy) Marco Cecchinato (final, withdrew)
2. (Spain) Carlos Taberner (champion)
3. (Slovakia) Andrej Martin (second round)
4. (Serbia) Nikola Milojević (first round)
5. (Slovenia) Blaž Rola (first round)
6. (Italy) Alessandro Giannessi (semifinals)
7. (United Kingdom) Jay Clarke (first round)
8. (France) Mathias Bourgue (quarterfinals)

== Draw ==
Key

- Q = Qualifier
- WC = Wild card
- LL = Lucky loser
- Alt = Alternate
- ITF = ITF entry
- PR = Protected ranking
- SR = Special ranking
- SE = Special exempt
- JE = Junior exempt
- JR = Junior Accelerator Programme entrant
- CO = College Accelerator Programme entrant
- NG = Next Gen Accelerator Program entrant
- w/o = Walkover
- r = Retired
- d = Defaulted

=== Finals ===
Semifinals
1	(Italy) Marco Cecchinato	6	7^{7}
(Bosnia and Herzegovina) Nerman Fatić	3	6^{4}
6	(Italy) Alessandro Giannessi	4	3
2	(Spain) Carlos Taberner	6	6

Final
1	(Italy) Marco Cecchinato
2	(Spain) Carlos Taberner	w/o

=== Top half ===
First round
1	(Italy) M Cecchinato	7^{7}	7^{7}
Alt	(Spain) Á López San Martín	6^{5}	6^{2}
(France) M Guinard	6	3	4
(Croatia) N Serdarušić	2	6	6
Alt	(Bosnia and Herzegovina) A Šetkić	6	6
WC	(Bulgaria) A Genov	3	4
(Serbia) D Petrović	2^{r}
8	(France) M Bourgue	5
3	(Slovakia) A Martin	7^{7}	6
WC	(Croatia) M Poljičak	6^{2}	3
Q	(Austria) F Misolic	6	6
Q	(India) A Kadhe	1	2
Q	(Spain) N Álvarez Varona	5	2
(Bosnia and Herzegovina) N Fatić	7	6
Q	(Ukraine) G Kravchenko	6	6
5	(Slovenia) B Rola	4	2

Second round
1	(Italy) M Cecchinato	6^{4}	7^{7}	6
(Croatia) N Serdarušić	7^{7}	6^{4}	1
Alt	(Bosnia and Herzegovina) A Šetkić	0	2
8	(France) M Bourgue	6	6
3	(Slovakia) A Martin	1	6^{11}
Q	(Austria) F Misolic	6	7^{13}
(Bosnia and Herzegovina) N Fatić	6	2	6
Q	(Ukraine) G Kravchenko	3	6	3

Quarterfinals
1	(Italy) M Cecchinato	6	2	7
8	(France) M Bourgue	0	6	5
Q	(Austria) F Misolic	6^{6}	2
(Bosnia and Herzegovina) N Fatić	7^{8}	6

Semifinals
1	(Italy) M Cecchinato	6	7^{7}
(Bosnia and Herzegovina) N Fatić	3	6^{4}

=== Bottom half ===
First round
6	(Italy) A Giannessi	7^{7}	7
(Netherlands) R Haase	6^{4}	5
(Croatia) D Ajduković	6^{2}	0
(Italy) F Agamenone	7^{7}	6
Alt	(Italy) R Brancaccio	6	3	6
(Turkey) E Kırkın	3	6	2
(Spain) C Gimeno Valero	6	6
4	(Serbia) N Milojević	3	1
7	(United Kingdom) J Clarke	3	6	3
(Italy) A Arnaboldi	6	3	6
(Czech Republic) J Forejtek	6	6
WC	(Romania) VV Cornea	4	4
(France) G Blancaneaux	6	6
(Romania) FC Jianu	2	3
(Spain) J Barranco Cosano	4	3
2	(Spain) C Taberner	6	6

Second round
6	(Italy) A Giannessi	7^{9}	3	6
(Italy) F Agamenone	6^{7}	6	1
Alt	(Italy) R Brancaccio	6	6
(Spain) C Gimeno Valero	4	1
(Italy) A Arnaboldi	6	3	6
(Czech Republic) J Forejtek	3	6	4
(France) G Blancaneaux	6^{1}	6	1
2	(Spain) C Taberner	7^{7}	3	6

Quarterfinals
6	(Italy) A Giannessi	6	6^{6}	6
Alt	(Italy) R Brancaccio	3	7^{8}	1
(Italy) A Arnaboldi	2	0
2	(Spain) C Taberner	6	6

Semifinals
6	(Italy) A Giannessi	4	3
2	(Spain) C Taberner	6	6
