= 2025 Murcia Open – Doubles =

Doubles
- 2025 Murcia Open

Final
- Champions: (France) Grégoire Jacq (Brazil) Orlando Luz
- Runners-up: (Netherlands) Jesper de Jong (Netherlands) Mats Hermans
- Score: 6–4, 6–4

Events
Singles	Doubles
- Murcia Open

Théo Arribagé and Victor Vlad Cornea were the defending champions but Arribagé chose not to compete. Cornea partnered Andreas Mies but lost in the first round to Alexander Donski and Bruno Pujol Navarro.

Grégoire Jacq and Orlando Luz won the title after defeating Jesper de Jong and Mats Hermans 6–4, 6–4 in the final.

== Seeds ==
1. (France) Grégoire Jacq / (Brazil) Orlando Luz (champions)
2. (Monaco) Romain Arneodo / (France) Manuel Guinard (quarterfinals)
3. (Romania) Victor Vlad Cornea / (Germany) Andreas Mies (first round)
4. (India) Jeevan Nedunchezhiyan / (India) Vijay Sundar Prashanth (first round)

== Draw ==
Key

- Q = Qualifier
- WC = Wild card
- LL = Lucky loser
- Alt = Alternate
- ITF = ITF entry
- PR = Protected ranking
- SR = Special ranking
- SE = Special exempt
- JE = Junior exempt
- JR = Junior Accelerator Programme entrant
- CO = College Accelerator Programme entrant
- NG = Next Gen Accelerator Program entrant
- w/o = Walkover
- r = Retired
- d = Defaulted

=== Draw ===
First round
1	(France) G Jacq (Brazil) O Luz	3	6	[10]
(Lebanon) B Hassan (Jordan) A Shelbayh	6	4	[6]
WC	(Italy) R Brancaccio (Italy) A Pellegrino	6	6^{6}	[10]
(Israel) D Cukierman (United Kingdom) J Paris	3	7^{8}	[6]
4	(India) J Nedunchezhiyan (India) VS Prashanth	3	7	[7]
(Denmark) J Ingildsen (United Kingdom) D Stevenson	6	5	[10]
(India) A Chandrasekar (Spain) D Vega Hernández	6	2	[10]
(Spain) Í Cervantes (Spain) S Martos Gornés	3	6	[5]
(Netherlands) J de Jong (Netherlands) M Hermans	6	6
Alt	I Gakhov (Kazakhstan) D Yevseyev	4	4
(Bulgaria) A Donski (Spain) B Pujol Navarro	6	6
3	(Romania) V Cornea (Germany) A Mies	3	3
(Lithuania) E Butvilas (India) R Ramanathan	6	4	[10]
WC	(Spain) J Barranco Cosano (Spain) B Winter López	4	6	[8]
(Spain) N Álvarez Varona (Spain) C Taberner	4	2
2	(Monaco) R Arneodo (France) M Guinard	6	6

Quarterfinals
1	(France) G Jacq (Brazil) O Luz	6	6
WC	(Italy) R Brancaccio (Italy) A Pellegrino	2	2
(Denmark) J Ingildsen (United Kingdom) D Stevenson	4	3
(India) A Chandrasekar (Spain) D Vega Hernández	6	6
(Netherlands) J de Jong (Netherlands) M Hermans	7^{7}	3	[10]
(Bulgaria) A Donski (Spain) B Pujol Navarro	6^{1}	6	[8]
(Lithuania) E Butvilas (India) R Ramanathan	6	6
2	(Monaco) R Arneodo (France) M Guinard	3	3

Semifinals
1	(France) G Jacq (Brazil) O Luz	6	6
(India) A Chandrasekar (Spain) D Vega Hernández	3	4
(Netherlands) J de Jong (Netherlands) M Hermans	6	6
(Lithuania) E Butvilas (India) R Ramanathan	3	2

Final
1	(France) G Jacq (Brazil) O Luz	6	6
(Netherlands) J de Jong (Netherlands) M Hermans	4	4
