= 2022 Challenger di Roseto degli Abruzzi =

- Date: 7–13 March
- Edition: 1st
- Surface: Clay
- Location: Roseto degli Abruzzi, Italy

Champions

Singles
- (Spain) Carlos Taberner

Doubles
- (Monaco) Hugo Nys / (Poland) Jan Zieliński
Challenger di Roseto degli Abruzzi	· 2022 →

The 2022 Challenger di Roseto degli Abruzzi was a professional tennis tournament played on clay courts. It was the 1st edition of the tournament which was part of the 2022 ATP Challenger Tour. It took place in Roseto degli Abruzzi, Italy between 7 and 13 March 2022.

== Singles main-draw entrants ==
=== Seeds ===
Country	Player	Rank^{1}	Seed
ESP	Carlos Taberner	107	1
~~ITA~~	~~Stefano Travaglia~~	~~111~~	~~2~~
ESP	Bernabé Zapata Miralles	118	3
SRB	Nikola Milojević	127	4
SVK	Andrej Martin	128	5
POR	Nuno Borges	165	6
ITA	Flavio Cobolli	178	7
ITA	Gian Marco Moroni	183	8

- ^{1} Rankings are as of 28 February 2022.

=== Other entrants ===
The following players received wildcards into the singles main draw:

- (Italy) Andrea Del Federico
- (Italy) Francesco Maestrelli
- (Italy) Francesco Passaro

The following players received entry into the singles main draw as alternates:

- (Croatia) Duje Ajduković
- (Italy) Andrea Arnaboldi
- (Czech Republic) Lukáš Rosol

The following players received entry from the qualifying draw:

- (Italy) Matteo Arnaldi
- (Italy) Luciano Darderi
- (France) Alexis Gautier
- (Spain) Carlos Gimeno Valero
- (France) Calvin Hemery
- (Spain) Nikolás Sánchez Izquierdo

The following player received entry as a lucky loser:

- (Germany) Elmar Ejupovic

== Champions ==
=== Singles ===
- (Spain) Carlos Taberner def. (Portugal) Nuno Borges 6–2, 6–3.

=== Doubles ===
- (Monaco) Hugo Nys / (Poland) Jan Zieliński def. (Czech Republic) Roman Jebavý / (Austria) Philipp Oswald 7–6^{(7–2)}, 4–6, [10–3].
