= 2022 Challenger di Roseto degli Abruzzi – Singles =

Singles
- 2022 Challenger di Roseto degli Abruzzi

Final
- Champion: (Spain) Carlos Taberner
- Runner-up: (Portugal) Nuno Borges
- Score: 6–2, 6–3

Events
Singles	Doubles
Challenger di Roseto degli Abruzzi	· 2022 →

This was the first edition of the tournament.

Carlos Taberner won the title after defeating Nuno Borges 6–2, 6–3 in the final.

== Seeds ==
1. (Spain) Carlos Taberner (champion)
2. (Italy) Stefano Travaglia (first round, withdrew)
3. (Spain) Bernabé Zapata Miralles (second round)
4. (Serbia) Nikola Milojević (second round)
5. (Slovakia) Andrej Martin (first round)
6. (Portugal) Nuno Borges (final)
7. (Italy) Flavio Cobolli (semifinals)
8. (Italy) Gian Marco Moroni (first round)

== Draw ==
=== Key ===
- Q = Qualifier
- WC = Wild card
- LL = Lucky loser
- Alt = Alternate
- SE = Special exempt
- PR = Protected ranking
- ITF = ITF entry
- JE = Junior exempt
- w/o = Walkover
- r = Retired
- d = Defaulted
- SR = Special ranking

=== Finals ===
Semifinals
1	(Spain) Carlos Taberner	6	7
Q	(Spain) Nikolás Sánchez Izquierdo	4	5
6	(Portugal) Nuno Borges	6	5	6
7	(Italy) Flavio Cobolli	1	7	2

Final
1	(Spain) Carlos Taberner	6	6
6	(Portugal) Nuno Borges	2	3

=== Top half ===
First round
1	(Spain) C Taberner	6	6
(Italy) L Giustino	2	4
(Belgium) K Coppejans	3	7	2
(Slovakia) J Kovalík	6	5	6
(Italy) F Gaio	2	6^{3}
(Croatia) N Serdarušić	6	7^{7}
Q	(Spain) C Gimeno Valero	6	6
8	(Italy) GM Moroni	3	1
3	(Spain) B Zapata Miralles	6	6
Alt	(Croatia) D Ajduković	3	1
Q	(Spain) N Sánchez Izquierdo	7	1	6
WC	(Italy) F Maestrelli	5	6	2
Alt	(Czech Republic) L Rosol	7	6
Q	(Italy) L Darderi	5	3
(Italy) A Giannessi	6	2	6
5	(Slovakia) A Martin	0	6	4

Second round
1	(Spain) C Taberner	7^{9}	6
(Slovakia) J Kovalík	6^{7}	2
(Croatia) N Serdarušić	2	5
Q	(Spain) C Gimeno Valero	6	7
3	(Spain) B Zapata Miralles	5	6	3
Q	(Spain) N Sánchez Izquierdo	7	0	6
Alt	(Czech Republic) L Rosol	6	6
(Italy) A Giannessi	3	4

Quarterfinals
1	(Spain) C Taberner	6	6
Q	(Spain) C Gimeno Valero	2	3
Q	(Spain) N Sánchez Izquierdo	6	6
Alt	(Czech Republic) L Rosol	4	2

Semifinals
1	(Spain) C Taberner	6	7
Q	(Spain) N Sánchez Izquierdo	4	5

=== Bottom half ===
First round
6	(Portugal) N Borges	6	1	6
(France) M Bourgue	1	6	1
Q	(Italy) M Arnaldi	6	6
WC	(Italy) F Passaro	3	4
Q	(France) C Hemery	1	6^{4}
Alt	(Italy) A Arnaboldi	6	7^{7}
(Italy) A Pellegrino	2	5
4	(Serbia) N Milojević	6	7
7	(Italy) F Cobolli	3
(Argentina) M Trungelliti	2^{r}
Q	(France) Alexis Gautier	6	6
WC	(Italy) Andrea Del Federico	1	3
(Kazakhstan) T Skatov	2	7^{7}	6
LL	(Germany) Elmar Ejupovic	6	6^{1}	2
(Portugal) J Domingues	w/o
2	(Italy) S Travaglia

Second round
6	(Portugal) N Borges	6^{5}	7	6
Q	(Italy) M Arnaldi	7^{7}	5	1
Alt	(Italy) A Arnaboldi	6	7^{7}
4	(Serbia) N Milojević	4	6^{2}
7	(Italy) F Cobolli	6	7
Q	(France) A Gautier	1	5
(Kazakhstan) T Skatov	7^{7}	6
(Portugal) J Domingues	6^{5}	2

Quarterfinals
6	(Portugal) N Borges	6	7^{7}
Alt	(Italy) A Arnaboldi	4	6^{2}
7	(Italy) F Cobolli	4	6	6
(Kazakhstan) T Skatov	6	2	4

Semifinals
6	(Portugal) N Borges	6	5	6
7	(Italy) F Cobolli	1	7	2
