= 2023 Challenger di Roseto degli Abruzzi – Doubles =

Doubles
- 2023 Challenger di Roseto degli Abruzzi

Final
- Champions: (France) Dan Added (France) Titouan Droguet
- Runners-up: (Italy) Jacopo Berrettini (Italy) Andrea Pellegrino
- Score: 6–2, 1–6, [12–10]

Events
Singles	Doubles
- Challenger di Roseto degli Abruzzi

Franco Agamenone and Manuel Guinard were the defending champions but only Agamenone chose to defend his title, partnering Salvatore Caruso. Agamenone lost in the first round to Jacopo Berrettini and Andrea Pellegrino.

Dan Added and Titouan Droguet won the title after defeating Berrettini and Pellegrino 6–2, 1–6, [12–10] in the final.

== Seeds ==
1. (France) Dan Added / (France) Titouan Droguet (champions)
2. (Sweden) Filip Bergevi / (Latvia) Miķelis Lībietis (first round)
3. (Switzerland) Luca Margaroli / (Netherlands) Jelle Sels (quarterfinals)
4. (Italy) Jacopo Berrettini / (Italy) Andrea Pellegrino (final)

== Draw ==
Key

- Q = Qualifier
- WC = Wild card
- LL = Lucky loser
- Alt = Alternate
- ITF = ITF entry
- PR = Protected ranking
- SR = Special ranking
- SE = Special exempt
- JE = Junior exempt
- JR = Junior Accelerator Programme entrant
- CO = College Accelerator Programme entrant
- NG = Next Gen Accelerator Program entrant
- w/o = Walkover
- r = Retired
- d = Defaulted

First round
1	(France) D Added (France) T Droguet	6	7^{7}
(Netherlands) J de Jong (Netherlands) M Houkes	1	6^{3}
WC	(Italy) F Arnaboldi (Italy) G Ferrari	w/o
Alt	(Italy) GM Moroni (Italy) G Piraino
3	(Switzerland) L Margaroli (Netherlands) J Sels	6	6
(Serbia) N Milojević (Poland) F Peliwo	3	3
WC	(Italy) Andrea Del Federico (Italy) G Ricca	5	4
(Italy) G Fonio (Italy) F Forti	7	6
(India) S Nagal (Hungary) M Valkusz
(Croatia) Z Babić (Croatia) N Serdarušić	w/o
(Italy) F Agamenone (Italy) S Caruso	6	5	[5]
4	(Italy) J Berrettini (Italy) A Pellegrino	3	7	[10]
(Uzbekistan) S Fayziev (Greece) M Kalovelonis	5	3
(Romania) ND Ionel (Romania) A Jecan	7	6
(Switzerland) R Bertola (Argentina) S Rodríguez Taverna	6	6
2	(Sweden) F Bergevi (Latvia) M Lībietis	3	3

Quarterfinals
1	(France) D Added (France) T Droguet	6	6
WC	(Italy) F Arnaboldi (Italy) G Ferrari	3	4
3	(Switzerland) L Margaroli (Netherlands) J Sels	6^{5}	3
(Italy) G Fonio (Italy) F Forti	7^{7}	6
(Croatia) Z Babić (Croatia) N Serdarušić	6	4	[5]
4	(Italy) J Berrettini (Italy) A Pellegrino	4	6	[10]
(Romania) ND Ionel (Romania) A Jecan	6	4	[7]
(Switzerland) R Bertola (Argentina) S Rodríguez Taverna	2	6	[10]

Semifinals
1	(France) D Added (France) T Droguet	7	7
(Italy) G Fonio (Italy) F Forti	5	5
4	(Italy) J Berrettini (Italy) A Pellegrino	w/o
(Switzerland) R Bertola (Argentina) S Rodríguez Taverna

Final
1	(France) D Added (France) T Droguet	6	1	[12]
4	(Italy) J Berrettini (Italy) A Pellegrino	2	6	[10]
