= 2026 Cattolica Challenger – Singles =

Singles
- 2026 Cattolica Challenger

Final
- Champion: (Netherlands) Jesper de Jong
- Runner-up: (Spain) Roberto Carballés Baena
- Score: 6–3, 6–2

Events
Singles	Doubles
- Cattolica Challenger

This was the first edition of the tournament.

Jesper de Jong won the title after defeating Roberto Carballés Baena 6–3, 6–2 in the final.

== Seeds ==
1. (Netherlands) Jesper de Jong (champion)
2. (Czech Republic) Dalibor Svrčina (first round)
3. (Serbia) Dušan Lajović (second round)
4. (Italy) Stefano Travaglia (withdrew)
5. (Italy) Marco Cecchinato (quarterfinals)
6. (Peru) Gonzalo Bueno (first round)
7. (Croatia) Luka Mikrut (withdrew)
8. (Croatia) Matej Dodig (first round)
9. (Spain) Roberto Carballés Baena (final)
10. (United Kingdom) Liam Broady (second round)

== Draw ==
Key

- Q = Qualifier
- WC = Wild card
- LL = Lucky loser
- Alt = Alternate
- ITF = ITF entry
- PR = Protected ranking
- SR = Special ranking
- SE = Special exempt
- JE = Junior exempt
- JR = Junior Accelerator Programme entrant
- CO = College Accelerator Programme entrant
- NG = Next Gen Accelerator Program entrant
- w/o = Walkover
- r = Retired
- d = Defaulted

=== Finals ===
Semifinals
1	(Netherlands) Jesper de Jong	2	7^{9}	6
WC	(Italy) Enrico Dalla Valle	6	6^{7}	2
9	(Spain) Roberto Carballés Baena	3	6	6
Q	(Italy) Francesco Forti	6	1	4

Final
1	(Netherlands) Jesper de Jong	6	6
9	(Spain) Roberto Carballés Baena	3	2

=== Top half ===
First round
1	(Netherlands) J de Jong	6	7^{7}
NG	(Serbia) O Milić	1	6^{3}
WC	(Italy) F Bondioli	7^{7}	6^{5}	6
Q	(Italy) CA Caniato	6^{3}	7^{7}	4
(Ecuador) Á Guillén Meza	3	7^{7}	7^{7}
I Simakin	6	6^{5}	6^{5}
Q	(Bulgaria) P Nesterov	5	3
5	(Italy) M Cecchinato	7	6
3	(Serbia) D Lajović	6	5	6
(Czech Republic) J Forejtek	2	7	4
LL	(Italy) S Pieri	5	3
Alt	(Spain) O Roca Batalla	7	6
Alt	(Poland) M Kaśnikowski	5	2
WC	(Italy) E Dalla Valle	7	6
Q	(Spain) C Sánchez Jover	6	6
8	(Croatia) M Dodig	4	4

Second round
1	(Netherlands) J de Jong	6	4	6
WC	(Italy) F Bondioli	2	6	4
(Ecuador) Á Guillén Meza	3	7^{7}	4
5	(Italy) M Cecchinato	6	6^{4}	6
3	(Serbia) D Lajović	6^{4}	6	6^{4}
Alt	(Spain) O Roca Batalla	7^{7}	4	7^{7}
WC	(Italy) E Dalla Valle	7^{7}	6
Q	(Spain) C Sánchez Jover	6^{4}	1

Quarterfinals
1	(Netherlands) J de Jong	6	4	6
5	(Italy) M Cecchinato	3	6	1
Alt	(Spain) O Roca Batalla	6^{2}	1
WC	(Italy) E Dalla Valle	7^{7}	6

Semifinals
1	(Netherlands) J de Jong	2	7^{9}	6
WC	(Italy) E Dalla Valle	6	6^{7}	2

=== Bottom half ===
First round
10	(United Kingdom) L Broady	6	3	6
Alt	(Greece) Ioannis Xilas	3	6	2
WC	(Italy) Pierluigi Basile	6^{4}	6^{4}
(Italy) R Brancaccio	7^{7}	7^{7}
LL	(Italy) G Ferrari	7^{8}	6
Q	(Spain) Sergio Callejón Hernando	6^{6}	0
PR	(Germany) MH Rehberg	4	4
9	(Spain) R Carballés Baena	6	6
6	(Peru) G Bueno	5	6	6^{2}
Q	(Italy) F Forti	7	4	7^{7}
(Italy) M Ribecai	6	6^{5}	3
(Italy) F Agamenone	3	7^{7}	6
Q	(Colombia) Miguel Tobón	4	2
JR	(Bulgaria) A Vasilev	6	6
(Italy) A Guerrieri	6	3	6
2	(Czech Republic) D Svrčina	3	6	4

Second round
10	(United Kingdom) L Broady	2	4
(Italy) R Brancaccio	6	6
LL	(Italy) G Ferrari	4	4
9	(Spain) R Carballés Baena	6	6
Q	(Italy) F Forti	6	6^{5}	6
(Italy) F Agamenone	3	7^{7}	1
JR	(Bulgaria) A Vasilev	6^{5}	5
(Italy) A Guerrieri	7^{7}	7

Quarterfinals
(Italy) R Brancaccio	4	6	3
9	(Spain) R Carballés Baena	6	3	6
Q	(Italy) F Forti	7^{9}	6
(Italy) A Guerrieri	6^{7}	4

Semifinals
9	(Spain) R Carballés Baena	3	6	6
Q	(Italy) F Forti	6	1	4
