= 2023 Challenger di Roseto degli Abruzzi =

- Date: 17–23 April
- Edition: 3rd
- Surface: Clay
- Location: Roseto degli Abruzzi, Italy

Champions

Singles
- (Austria) Filip Misolic

Doubles
- (France) Dan Added / (France) Titouan Droguet
- Challenger di Roseto degli Abruzzi

The 2023 Challenger di Roseto degli Abruzzi was a professional tennis tournament played on clay courts. It was the third edition of the tournament which was part of the 2023 ATP Challenger Tour. It took place in Roseto degli Abruzzi, Italy between 17 and 23 April 2023.

== Singles main-draw entrants ==
=== Seeds ===
Country	Player	Rank^{1}	Seed
AUT	Filip Misolic	143	1
ITA	Franco Agamenone	147	2
NED	Jelle Sels	162	3
USA	Emilio Nava	172	4
ITA	Andrea Pellegrino	173	5
CZE	Dalibor Svrčina	207	6
ROU	Nicholas David Ionel	218	7
BEL	Gauthier Onclin	222	8

- ^{1} Rankings are as of 10 April 2023.

=== Other entrants ===
The following players received wildcards into the singles main draw:

- (Italy) Gianmarco Ferrari
- (Italy) Giovanni Fonio
- (Italy) Francesco Forti

The following players received entry into the singles main draw as alternates:

- (Italy) Salvatore Caruso
- (Ukraine) Illya Marchenko
- (Serbia) Nikola Milojević

The following players received entry from the qualifying draw:

- (Italy) Jacopo Berrettini
- (Turkey) Ergi Kırkın
- (Italy) Edoardo Lavagno
- (Italy) Gian Marco Moroni
- (India) Sumit Nagal
- (Italy) Gabriele Piraino

== Champions ==
=== Singles ===
- (Austria) Filip Misolic def. (Belgium) Raphaël Collignon 4–6, 7–5, 7–6^{(8–6)}.

=== Doubles ===
- (France) Dan Added / (France) Titouan Droguet def. (Italy) Jacopo Berrettini / (Italy) Andrea Pellegrino 6–2, 1–6, [12–10].
