= Lošinj Open =

- 2021 Lošinj Open

ATP Challenger Tour
- Event name: Lošinj Open
- Location: Veli Lošinj, Croatia
- Venue: Ljubicic Tennis Academy
- Category: ATP Challenger Tour
- Surface: Clay
- Draw: 32S/32Q/16D

The Lošinj Open is a professional tennis tournament played on outdoor clay courts. It is currently part of the ATP Challenger Tour. It is held annually in Lošinj, Croatia since 2021.

== Past finals ==
=== Singles ===
| Year | Champion | Runner-up | Score |
|---|---|---|---|
| 2021 | (Spain) Carlos Taberner | (Italy) Marco Cecchinato | Walkover |

=== Doubles ===
| Year | Champions | Runners-up | Score |
|---|---|---|---|
| 2021 | (Slovakia) Andrej Martin (Austria) Tristan-Samuel Weissborn | (Romania) Victor Vlad Cornea (Turkey) Ergi Kırkın | 6–1, 7–6^{(7–5)} |
