= 2021 Challenger Ciudad de Guayaquil =

- Date: 1–7 November
- Edition: 17th
- Surface: Clay
- Location: Guayaquil, Ecuador

Champions

Singles
- (Chile) Alejandro Tabilo

Doubles
- (Netherlands) Jesper de Jong / (Netherlands) Bart Stevens
← 2020 ·	Challenger Ciudad de Guayaquil	· 2022 →

The 2021 Challenger Ciudad de Guayaquil was a professional tennis tournament played on clay courts. It was the seventeenth edition of the tournament which was part of the 2021 ATP Challenger Tour. It took place in Guayaquil, Ecuador between 1 and 7 November 2021.

== Singles main-draw entrants ==
=== Seeds ===
Country	Player	Rank^{1}	Seed
ESP	Jaume Munar	75	1
ARG	Facundo Bagnis	81	2
COL	Daniel Elahi Galán	106	3
ARG	Sebastián Báez	112	4
ARG	Francisco Cerúndolo	113	5
BRA	Thiago Seyboth Wild	126	6
BOL	Hugo Dellien	128	7
ARG	Tomás Martín Etcheverry	133	8

- ^{1} Rankings are as of 25 October 2021.

=== Other entrants ===
The following players received wildcards into the singles main draw:

- (Argentina) Facundo Bagnis
- (Ecuador) Álvaro Guillén Meza
- (Ecuador) Diego Hidalgo

The following players received entry into the singles main draw as alternates:

- (Argentina) Facundo Díaz Acosta
- (Canada) Alexis Galarneau

The following players received entry from the qualifying draw:

- (Peru) Nicolás Álvarez
- (Brazil) Daniel Dutra da Silva
- (Colombia) Alejandro González
- (Argentina) Facundo Juárez

The following player received entry as a lucky loser:

- (Spain) Nicolás Álvarez Varona

== Champions ==
=== Singles ===
- (Chile) Alejandro Tabilo def. (Netherlands) Jesper de Jong 6–1, 7–5.

=== Doubles ===
- (Netherlands) Jesper de Jong / (Netherlands) Bart Stevens def. (Ecuador) Diego Hidalgo / (Colombia) Cristian Rodríguez 7–5, 6–2.
