= 2021 Challenger Ciudad de Guayaquil – Doubles =

Doubles
- 2021 Challenger Ciudad de Guayaquil

Final
- Champions: (Netherlands) Jesper de Jong (Netherlands) Bart Stevens
- Runners-up: (Ecuador) Diego Hidalgo (Colombia) Cristian Rodríguez
- Score: 7–5, 6–2

Events
Singles	Doubles
- Challenger Ciudad de Guayaquil

Luis David Martínez and Felipe Meligeni Alves were the defending champions but only Martínez chose to defend his title, partnering Roberto Quiroz. Martínez lost in the first round to Jesper de Jong and Bart Stevens.

De Jong and Stevens won the title after defeating Diego Hidalgo and Cristian Rodríguez 7–5, 6–2 in the final.

== Seeds ==
1. (Venezuela) Luis David Martínez / (Ecuador) Roberto Quiroz (first round)
2. (Brazil) Fernando Romboli / (Bolivia) Federico Zeballos (semifinals)
3. (Colombia) Nicolás Barrientos / (Colombia) Alejandro Gómez (semifinals)
4. (Ecuador) Diego Hidalgo / (Colombia) Cristian Rodríguez (final)

== Draw ==
Key

- Q = Qualifier
- WC = Wild card
- LL = Lucky loser
- Alt = Alternate
- ITF = ITF entry
- PR = Protected ranking
- SR = Special ranking
- SE = Special exempt
- JE = Junior exempt
- JR = Junior Accelerator Programme entrant
- CO = College Accelerator Programme entrant
- NG = Next Gen Accelerator Program entrant
- w/o = Walkover
- r = Retired
- d = Defaulted

First round
1	(Venezuela) LD Martínez (Ecuador) R Quiroz	1	2
(Netherlands) J de Jong (Netherlands) B Stevens	6	6
(Argentina) G Andreozzi (Peru) S Galdós	6	6
PR	(Portugal) G Oliveira (New Zealand) R Statham	4	2
3	(Colombia) N Barrientos (Colombia) A Gómez	6	6
WC	(Ecuador) Francisco Castro (Ecuador) Miguel Mateo Larrea	3	1
WC	(Colombia) A González (Ecuador) Á Guillén Meza	5	3
(Barbados) D King (Serbia) P Krstin	7	6
(Bolivia) B Arias (Bolivia) H Dellien
(Argentina) H Casanova (Argentina) A Collarini	w/o
Alt	(Czech Republic) V Kopřiva (Czech Republic) J Pospíšil	1	4
4	(Ecuador) D Hidalgo (Colombia) C Rodríguez	6	6
WC	(Argentina) F Díaz Acosta (Dominican Republic) N Hardt	6	6
(Dominican Republic) R Cid Subervi (Chile) A Tabilo	3	4
(Peru) A Merino (Mexico) L Patiño	2	2
2	(Brazil) F Romboli (Bolivia) F Zeballos	6	6

Quarterfinals
(Netherlands) J de Jong (Netherlands) B Stevens	6	6
(Argentina) G Andreozzi (Peru) S Galdós	1	4
3	(Colombia) N Barrientos (Colombia) A Gómez	6	6
(Barbados) D King (Serbia) P Krstin	2	2
(Argentina) H Casanova (Argentina) A Collarini
4	(Ecuador) D Hidalgo (Colombia) C Rodríguez	w/o
WC	(Argentina) F Díaz Acosta (Dominican Republic) N Hardt	4	6^{7}
2	(Brazil) F Romboli (Bolivia) F Zeballos	6	7^{9}

Semifinals
(Netherlands) J de Jong (Netherlands) B Stevens	6	7
3	(Colombia) N Barrientos (Colombia) A Gómez	3	5
4	(Ecuador) D Hidalgo (Colombia) C Rodríguez	6	6
2	(Brazil) F Romboli (Bolivia) F Zeballos	3	4

Final
(Netherlands) J de Jong (Netherlands) B Stevens	7	6
4	(Ecuador) D Hidalgo (Colombia) C Rodríguez	5	2
