= 2025 Murcia Open – Singles =

Singles
- 2025 Murcia Open

Final
- Champion: (Spain) Carlos Taberner
- Runner-up: (Netherlands) Jesper de Jong
- Score: 7–6^{(7–3)}, 4–6, 6–2

Events
Singles	Doubles
- Murcia Open

Henrique Rocha was the defending champion but lost in the first round to Márton Fucsovics.

Carlos Taberner won the title after defeating Jesper de Jong 7–6^{(7–3)}, 4–6, 6–2 in the final.

== Seeds ==
1. (Hungary) Márton Fucsovics (quarterfinals)
2. (Netherlands) Jesper de Jong (final)
3. (Spain) Pablo Carreño Busta (first round)
4. (Austria) Sebastian Ofner (first round)
5. (India) Sumit Nagal (first round)
6. (France) Harold Mayot (quarterfinals, withdrew)
7. (Croatia) Marin Čilić (first round)
8. (France) Kyrian Jacquet (second round, retired)

== Draw ==
Key

- Q = Qualifier
- WC = Wild card
- LL = Lucky loser
- Alt = Alternate
- ITF = ITF entry
- PR = Protected ranking
- SR = Special ranking
- SE = Special exempt
- JE = Junior exempt
- JR = Junior Accelerator Programme entrant
- CO = College Accelerator Programme entrant
- NG = Next Gen Accelerator Program entrant
- w/o = Walkover
- r = Retired
- d = Defaulted

=== Finals ===
Semifinals
(Spain) Carlos Taberner	2	7	6
PR	(Belgium) Kimmer Coppejans	6	5	4
WC	Ivan Gakhov	5	1
2	(Netherlands) Jesper de Jong	7	6

Final
(Spain) Carlos Taberner	7^{7}	4	6
2	(Netherlands) Jesper de Jong	6^{3}	6	2

=== Top half ===
First round
1	(Hungary) M Fucsovics	6	6
(Portugal) H Rocha	2	3
(France) U Blanchet	4	7^{7}	3
(Lebanon) B Hassan	6	6^{2}	6
(Spain) C Taberner	7	3	6
(Lithuania) V Gaubas	5	6	1
Q	(Spain) D Mérida	6	6
7	(Croatia) M Čilić	2	4
4	(Austria) S Ofner	1	7^{7}	3
PR	(Belgium) K Coppejans	6	6^{4}	6
(Denmark) E Møller	4	7	6
Q	(Spain) M Damas	6	5	4
(Spain) D Rincón	6	6
LL	(Italy) Gabriele Pennaforti	0	3
WC	(Spain) P Llamas Ruiz	6	6
5	(India) S Nagal	4	1

Second round
1	(Hungary) M Fucsovics	7	6
(Lebanon) B Hassan	5	3
(Spain) C Taberner	7^{7}	7^{7}
Q	(Spain) D Mérida	6^{1}	6^{2}
PR	(Belgium) K Coppejans	6	6
(Denmark) E Møller	4	4
(Spain) D Rincón	2	2
WC	(Spain) P Llamas Ruiz	6	6

Quarterfinals
1	(Hungary) M Fucsovics	5	7	6^{3}
(Spain) C Taberner	7	5	7^{7}
PR	(Belgium) K Coppejans	6	6
WC	(Spain) P Llamas Ruiz	4	3

Semifinals
(Spain) C Taberner	2	7	6
PR	(Belgium) K Coppejans	6	5	4

=== Bottom half ===
First round
8	(France) K Jacquet	6	7^{7}
Q	(Spain) N Álvarez Varona	3	6^{4}
Alt	(Kazakhstan) D Yevseyev	6	6^{5}	6
Q	(Germany) J Engel	4	7^{7}	4
(Spain) J Barranco Cosano	2	1
(Norway) N Budkov Kjær	6	6
WC	I Gakhov	6	6
3	(Spain) P Carreño Busta	3	4
6	(France) H Mayot	6	4	7
(Lithuania) E Butvilas	4	6	5
(Spain) A Ramos Viñolas	3	6	6
WC	(Spain) B Zapata Miralles	6	4	3
Q	(Monaco) V Vacherot	7^{7}	6^{6}	6
Q	(Italy) R Brancaccio	6^{3}	7^{8}	3
(Italy) A Pellegrino	3	3
2	(Netherlands) J de Jong	6	6

Second round
8	(France) K Jacquet	6	3	0^{r}
Alt	(Kazakhstan) D Yevseyev	4	6	0
(Norway) N Budkov Kjær	4	6^{2}
WC	I Gakhov	6	7^{7}
6	(France) H Mayot	4	6	7
(Spain) A Ramos Viñolas	6	3	5
Q	(Monaco) V Vacherot	3	6	5
2	(Netherlands) J de Jong	6	3	7

Quarterfinals
Alt	(Kazakhstan) D Yevseyev	6	3	4
WC	I Gakhov	1	6	6
6	(France) H Mayot
2	(Netherlands) J de Jong	w/o

Semifinals
WC	I Gakhov	5	1
2	(Netherlands) J de Jong	7	6
