= 2022 Challenger di Roseto degli Abruzzi II =

- Date: 14–20 March
- Edition: 2nd
- Surface: Clay
- Location: Roseto degli Abruzzi, Italy

Champions

Singles
- (France) Manuel Guinard

Doubles
- (Italy) Franco Agamenone / (France) Manuel Guinard
- Challenger di Roseto degli Abruzzi

The 2022 Challenger di Roseto degli Abruzzi II was a professional tennis tournament played on clay courts. It was the second edition of the tournament which was part of the 2022 ATP Challenger Tour. It took place in Roseto degli Abruzzi, Italy between 14 and 20 March 2022.

== Singles main-draw entrants ==
=== Seeds ===
Country	Player	Rank^{1}	Seed
CZE	Jiří Veselý	74	1
ITA	Gianluca Mager	95	2
ESP	Carlos Taberner	105	3
~~FRA~~	~~Corentin Moutet~~	~~108~~	~~4~~
ESP	Bernabé Zapata Miralles	118	5
SRB	Nikola Milojević	126	6
SVK	Andrej Martin	127	7
TPE	Tseng Chun-hsin	159	8

- ^{1} Rankings are as of 7 March 2022.

=== Other entrants ===
The following players received wildcards into the singles main draw:

- (Italy) Flavio Cobolli
- (Italy) Andrea Del Federico
- (Italy) Giulio Zeppieri

The following players received entry into the singles main draw as alternates:

- (France) Mathias Bourgue
- (France) Manuel Guinard
- (Canada) Brayden Schnur
- (Croatia) Nino Serdarušić

The following players received entry from the qualifying draw:

- (Italy) Luciano Darderi
- (France) Alexis Gautier
- (Spain) Carlos Gimeno Valero
- (Hungary) Zsombor Piros
- (Italy) Andrea Vavassori
- (Germany) Louis Wessels

The following players received entry as lucky losers:

- (Spain) Nicolás Álvarez Varona
- (Netherlands) Robin Haase

== Champions ==
=== Singles ===
- (France) Manuel Guinard def. (Chinese Taipei) Tseng Chun-hsin 6–1, 6–2.

=== Doubles ===
- (Italy) Franco Agamenone / (France) Manuel Guinard def. (Serbia) Ivan Sabanov / (Serbia) Matej Sabanov 7–6^{(7–2)}, 7–6^{(7–3)}.
