= 2025 Murcia Open =

- Date: 17 – 23 March
- Edition: 6th
- Surface: Clay
- Location: Murcia, Spain

Champions

Singles
- (Spain) Carlos Taberner

Doubles
- (France) Grégoire Jacq / (Brazil) Orlando Luz
- Murcia Open

The 2025 Costa Cálida Región de Murcia, was a professional tennis tournament played on clay courts. It was the 6th edition of the tournament which was part of the 2025 ATP Challenger Tour. It took place in Murcia, Spain, between 17 and 23 March 2025.

== Singles main-draw entrants ==
=== Seeds ===
Country	Player	Rank^{1}	Seed
HUN	Márton Fucsovics	89	1
NED	Jesper de Jong	106	2
ESP	Pablo Carreño Busta	112	3
AUT	Sebastian Ofner	127	4
IND	Sumit Nagal	132	5
FRA	Harold Mayot	133	6
CRO	Marin Čilić	142	7
FRA	Kyrian Jacquet	154	8

- ^{1} Rankings are as of 3 March 2025.

=== Other entrants ===
The following players received wildcards into the singles main draw:

- Ivan Gakhov
- (Spain) Pablo Llamas Ruiz
- (Spain) Bernabé Zapata Miralles

The following player received entry into the singles main draw using a protected ranking:

- (Belgium) Kimmer Coppejans

The following player received entry into the singles main draw as a special exempt:

- (Netherlands) ~~Jelle Sels~~

The following player received entry into the singles main draw as an alternate:

- (Kazakhstan) Denis Yevseyev

The following players received entry from the qualifying draw:

- (Spain) Nicolás Álvarez Varona
- (Italy) Raúl Brancaccio
- (Spain) Miguel Damas
- (Germany) Justin Engel
- (Spain) Daniel Mérida
- (Monaco) Valentin Vacherot

The following player received entry as a lucky loser:

- (Italy) Gabriele Pennaforti

== Champions ==
=== Singles ===
- (Spain) Carlos Taberner def. (Netherlands) Jesper de Jong 7–6^{(7–3)}, 4–6, 6–2.

=== Doubles ===
- (France) Grégoire Jacq / (Brazil) Orlando Luz def. (Netherlands) Jesper de Jong / (Netherlands) Mats Hermans 6–4, 6–4.
