= 2021 Challenger Ciudad de Guayaquil – Singles =

Singles
- 2021 Challenger Ciudad de Guayaquil

Final
- Champion: (Chile) Alejandro Tabilo
- Runner-up: (Netherlands) Jesper de Jong
- Score: 6–1, 7–5

Events
Singles	Doubles
- Challenger Ciudad de Guayaquil

Francisco Cerúndolo was the defending champion but lost in the second round to Gonçalo Oliveira.

Alejandro Tabilo won the title after defeating Jesper de Jong 6–1, 7–5 in the final.

== Seeds ==
1. (Spain) Jaume Munar (first round)
2. (Argentina) Facundo Bagnis (quarterfinals)
3. (Colombia) Daniel Elahi Galán (quarterfinals)
4. (Argentina) Sebastián Báez (first round)
5. (Argentina) Francisco Cerúndolo (second round)
6. (Brazil) Thiago Seyboth Wild (semifinals)
7. (Bolivia) Hugo Dellien (second round)
8. (Argentina) Tomás Martín Etcheverry (semifinals)

== Draw ==
Key

- Q = Qualifier
- WC = Wild card
- LL = Lucky loser
- Alt = Alternate
- ITF = ITF entry
- PR = Protected ranking
- SR = Special ranking
- SE = Special exempt
- JE = Junior exempt
- JR = Junior Accelerator Programme entrant
- CO = College Accelerator Programme entrant
- NG = Next Gen Accelerator Program entrant
- w/o = Walkover
- r = Retired
- d = Defaulted

=== Finals ===
Semifinals
(Chile) Alejandro Tabilo	6	7^{7}
6	(Brazil) Thiago Seyboth Wild	2	6^{2}
(Netherlands) Jesper de Jong	7	6
8	(Argentina) Tomás Martín Etcheverry	5	3

Final
(Chile) Alejandro Tabilo	6	7
(Netherlands) Jesper de Jong	1	5

=== Top half ===
First round
1	(Spain) J Munar	4	2
(Chile) A Tabilo	6	6
WC	(Ecuador) Á Guillén Meza	6	3	4
(Barbados) D King	0	6	6
(Portugal) G Oliveira	6	7^{7}
(Dominican Republic) R Cid Subervi	3	6^{1}
(Czech Republic) V Kopřiva	7	2	3
5	(Argentina) F Cerúndolo	5	6	6
4	(Argentina) S Báez	6^{3}	6	5
(Argentina) N Kicker	7^{7}	4	7
Q	(Brazil) D Dutra da Silva	2	7^{7}	6
(Dominican Republic) N Hardt	6	6^{5}	0
Q	(Colombia) A González	6	6
Alt	(Canada) A Galarneau	2	4
(Argentina) A Collarini	3	7^{7}	2
6	(Brazil) T Seyboth Wild	6	6^{3}	6

Second round
(Chile) A Tabilo	6	6
(Barbados) D King	3	1
(Portugal) G Oliveira	6	6
5	(Argentina) F Cerúndolo	4	3
(Argentina) N Kicker	7^{7}	6
Q	(Brazil) D Dutra da Silva	6^{5}	3
Q	(Colombia) A González	6^{2}	0
6	(Brazil) T Seyboth Wild	7^{7}	6

Quarterfinals
(Chile) A Tabilo	6	6
(Portugal) G Oliveira	4	3
(Argentina) N Kicker	4	6^{8}
6	(Brazil) T Seyboth Wild	6	7^{10}

Semifinals
(Chile) A Tabilo	6	7^{7}
6	(Brazil) T Seyboth Wild	2	6^{2}

=== Bottom half ===
First round
7	(Bolivia) H Dellien	6	6
(Serbia) P Krstin	4	2
(Netherlands) J de Jong	3	7^{7}	0
(Argentina) G Andreozzi	6	6^{4}	0^{r}
Q	(Argentina) Facundo Juárez	3	6	6
Alt	(Argentina) F Díaz Acosta	6	4	4
(Colombia) N Mejía	2	5
3	(Colombia) DE Galán	6	7
8	(Argentina) TM Etcheverry	6	3	7
(Ecuador) R Quiroz	1	6	5
LL	(Spain) N Álvarez Varona	2	6	6
WC	(Ecuador) D Hidalgo	6	4	3
Q	(Peru) N Álvarez	4	7	6
(Argentina) TA Tirante	6	5	3
(Argentina) H Casanova	2	2
2/WC	(Argentina) F Bagnis	6	6

Second round
7	(Bolivia) H Dellien	1	0
(Netherlands) J de Jong	6	6
Q	(Argentina) F Juárez	4	3
3	(Colombia) DE Galán	6	6
8	(Argentina) TM Etcheverry	6	3	7^{7}
LL	(Spain) N Álvarez Varona	4	6	6^{4}
Q	(Peru) N Álvarez	2	6	1
2/WC	(Argentina) F Bagnis	6	4	6

Quarterfinals
(Netherlands) J de Jong	6	6^{5}	6
3	(Colombia) DE Galán	2	7^{7}	3
8	(Argentina) TM Etcheverry	6	6
2/WC	(Argentina) F Bagnis	4	0

Semifinals
(Netherlands) J de Jong	7	6
8	(Argentina) TM Etcheverry	5	3
