= 2026 Cattolica Challenger =

- Date: 8–14 June
- Edition: 1st
- Surface: Clay
- Location: Cattolica, Italy

Champions

Singles
- (Netherlands) Jesper de Jong

Doubles
- (Romania) Alexandru Jecan / (Romania) Bogdan Pavel
- Cattolica Challenger

The 2026 Cattolica Challenger was a professional tennis tournament played on clay courts. It was the first edition of the tournament which was part of the 2026 ATP Challenger Tour. It took place in Cattolica, Italy between 8 and 14 June 2026.

== Singles main-draw entrants ==
=== Seeds ===
Country	Player	Rank^{1}	Seed
NED	Jesper de Jong	106	1
CZE	Dalibor Svrčina	108	2
SRB	Dušan Lajović	137	3
~~ITA~~	~~Stefano Travaglia~~	~~138~~	~~4~~
ITA	Marco Cecchinato	178	5
PER	Gonzalo Bueno	183	6
~~CRO~~	~~Luka Mikrut~~	~~195~~	~~7~~
CRO	Matej Dodig	201	8
ESP	Roberto Carballés Baena	203	9
GBR	Liam Broady	219	10

- ^{1} Rankings are as of 25 May 2026.

=== Other entrants ===
The following players received wildcards into the singles main draw:

- (Italy) Pierluigi Basile
- (Italy) Federico Bondioli
- (Italy) Enrico Dalla Valle

The following player received entry into the singles main draw using a protected ranking:

- (Germany) Max Hans Rehberg

The following player received entry into the singles main draw through the Junior Accelerator programme:

- (Bulgaria) Alexander Vasilev

The following player received entry into the singles main draw through the Next Gen Accelerator programme:

- (Serbia) Ognjen Milić

The following players received entry into the singles main draw as alternates:

- (Poland) Maks Kaśnikowski
- (Spain) Oriol Roca Batalla
- (Greece) Ioannis Xilas

The following players received entry from the qualifying draw:

- (Spain) Sergio Callejón Hernando
- (Italy) Carlo Alberto Caniato
- (Italy) Francesco Forti
- (Bulgaria) Petr Nesterov
- (Spain) Carlos Sánchez Jover
- (Colombia) Miguel Tobón

The following players received entry as lucky losers:

- (Italy) Gianmarco Ferrari
- (Italy) Samuele Pieri

== Champions ==
=== Singles ===
- (Netherlands) Jesper de Jong def. (Spain) Roberto Carballés Baena 6–3, 6–2.

=== Doubles ===
- (Romania) Alexandru Jecan / (Romania) Bogdan Pavel def. (Sweden) Erik Grevelius / (Sweden) Adam Heinonen 7–6^{(12–10)}, 6–4.
