= Cattolica Challenger =

- 2026 Cattolica Challenger

ATP Challenger Tour
- Event name: Sic Europe Omag Open
- Location: Cattolica, Italy
- Category: ATP Challenger Tour
- Surface: Clay

The Cattolica Challenger, known as the Sic Europe Omag Open (for sponsorship reasons), is a professional tennis tournament played on clay courts. It is currently part of the ATP Challenger Tour. It was first held in Cattolica, Italy in 2026.

== Past finals ==
=== Singles ===
Year	Champion	Runner-up	Score
2026	(Netherlands) Jesper de Jong	(Spain) Roberto Carballés Baena	6–3, 6–2

=== Doubles ===
Year	Champions	Runners-up	Score
2026	(Romania) Alexandru Jecan (Romania) Bogdan Pavel	(Sweden) Erik Grevelius (Sweden) Adam Heinonen	7–6^{(12–10)}, 6–4
