= Veli Lošinj =

Village in Primorje-Gorski Kotar, Croatia

Veli Lošinj Lussingrande
- Village
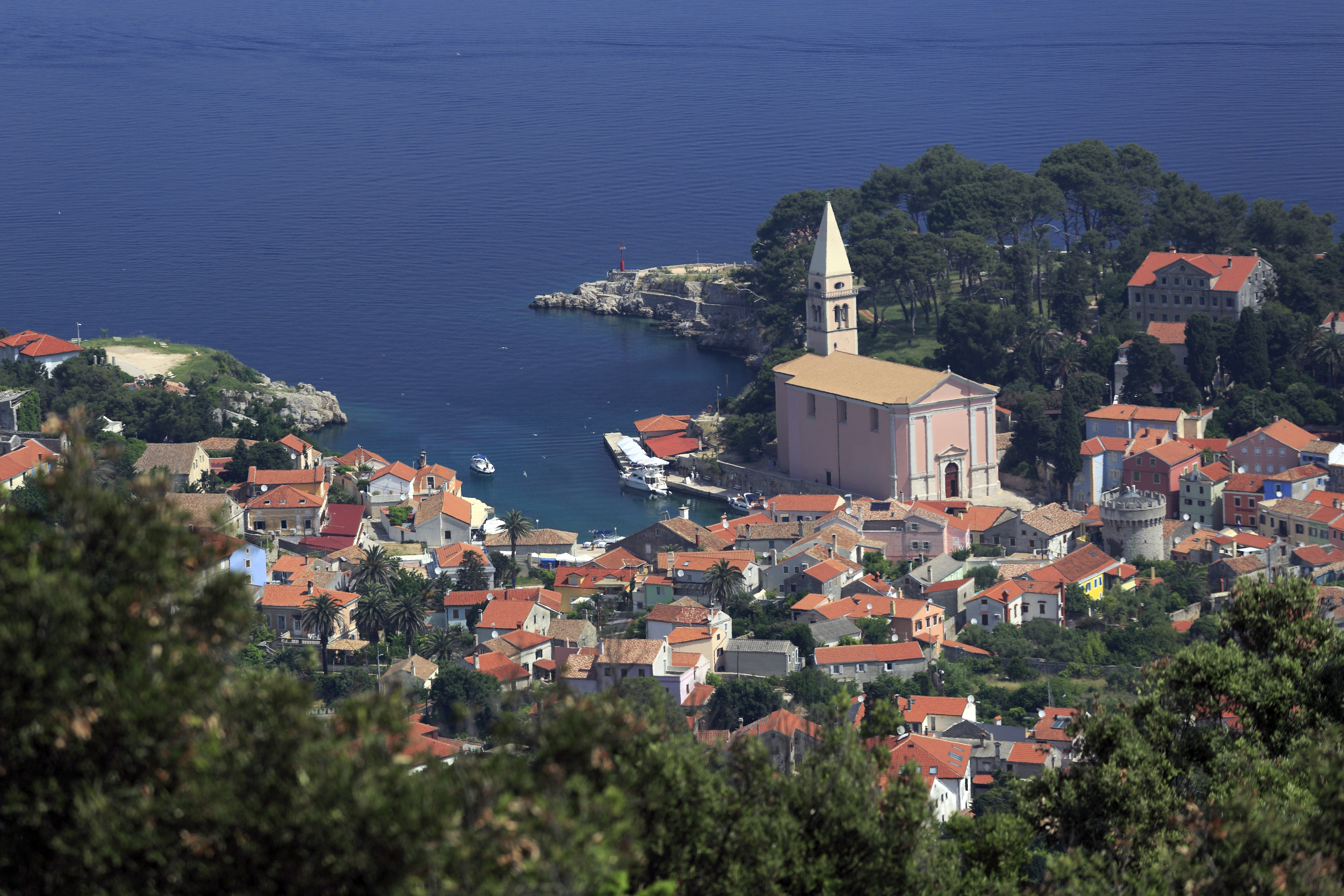
- View of Veli Lošinj

- Location within Croatia
- Coordinates: 44.52106°N 14.50112°E
- Country: Croatia
- County: Primorje-Gorski Kotar
- Town: Mali Lošinj

Area
  - Total: 17.1 km^{2} (6.6 sq mi)

Population (2021)
  - Total: 857
  - Density: 50.1/km^{2} (130/sq mi)
- Time zone: UTC+1 (CET)
  - Summer (DST): UTC+2 (CEST)
- Postal code: 51551
- Area code: 051
- Vehicle registration: RI

Veli Lošinj (Italian: Lussingrande) is a village on the island of Lošinj in Primorje-Gorski Kotar County in western Croatia. Veli Lošinj has a mild climate and caters to tourists. It is located 5 km to the southeast of the town of Mali Lošinj, of which it is part administratively. It was an important port and fishing centre until the late 19th century. Today it is known as a tourist and aromatherapy centre. As of 2021, Veli Lošinj had a population of 857

Located in the south of the island of Lošinj, 3 km (1.9 mi) east of central Mali Lošinj, which is the administrative centre of the island. Mali Lošinj and Veli Lošinj form a single conglomeration along the coast. Veli Lošinj faces the sea from the south. It is at the foot of Kalvarija mountain.

== History ==
=== Antiquity ===
The area of the present village was mostly unpopulated and resorted under the rule of the city of Osor on northern Lošinj which counted 20,000 inhabitants at that time. For a period Veli Lošinj was the seat of the bishopric due to the plague visiting nearby Osor. After a single year, the bishopric was disbanded and merged with the bishopric of Krk.

Defensive tower, today a museum

=== Middle Ages ===
The first mention of the town dates back to 1398 by the name of Velo selo. The oldest core of the city was built between the 13th and 14th centuries around the Romanesque church of Sv. Nikola (Saint Nicholas) from the 14th century. The town grew along agricultural alignments, not along laid-out city streets. In the 15th century, the still-standing defensive tower was built, erected to defend the harbour and the settlement, but also to protect the locals from pirate attacks.

In the 17th century, the town continued to develop in a circular form around the bay of Veli Lošinj. It became urban in appearance and Baroque in style with a central square near the sea and two main streets of which one leads to Velo Selo, and the other to the settlement of Rovenska, where a fishing village with stone houses was erected.

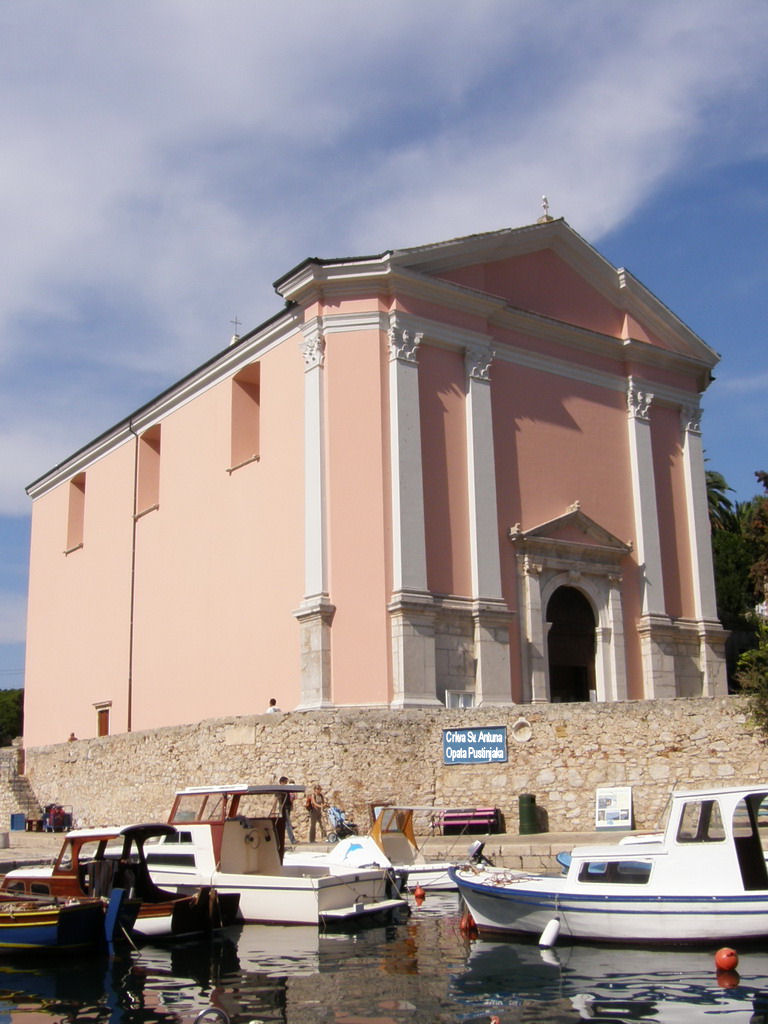
Sv. Antun Opat Pustinjak church

Town centre

The city church of Sv. Antun Opat Pustinjak (Saint Anthony of Egypt) was built in place of an earlier smaller church in the 15th century. In the 17th century, the old church was demolished and construction of a larger basilica began in 1774. It was built on the foundations of its predecessor and still stands to this day. The church contains one of the richest collections of work by Italian masters on the Kvarner islands, for instance by: Bartolomeo Vivarini, Bernardo Strozzi, Lattanzio Querena, Francesco Hayez, Francesco del Cossa, F. Polenzo.

Not far from harbour in Veli Lošinj the church of St. Marija (Saint Mary's, also known as the Gospe od anđela or Our Lady of the Angels church) was built in 1510. Later, the church was refurbished in the Baroque style. It contains an art collection by Venetian painters: "Saint Francis and Saint Hildebrand" by F. Fontebasso, eight paintings by G. A. Pellegrini, and a few paintings from the 16th to 18th centuries. One of these is a work by Titian.

=== Modern era ===
When Mali Lošinj started to develop, Veli Lošinj stagnated. There was a shipyard in Veli Lošinj that produced sailboats but in the time it was active, sailboats went out of use. A new shipyard was constructed in Mali Lošinj which turned out motor-powered ships. After World War I, Veli Lošinj did not have enough economic clout to develop new projects.

== Climate ==
Since records began in 1981, the highest temperature recorded at the local weather station was 38.0 °C (100.4 °F), on 13 July 1991. The coldest temperature was −5.0 °C (23.0 °F), on 7 January 1985.

== Panorama ==
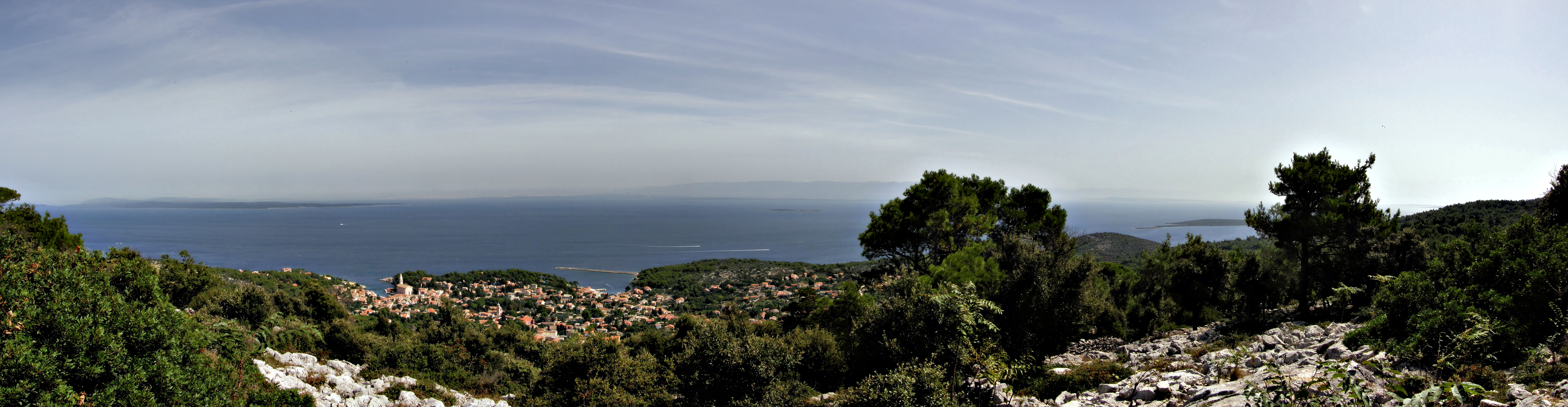
The view from Mt. St. Ivan on Veli Lošinj.
