= Jesper de Jong =

Dutch tennis player (born 2000)

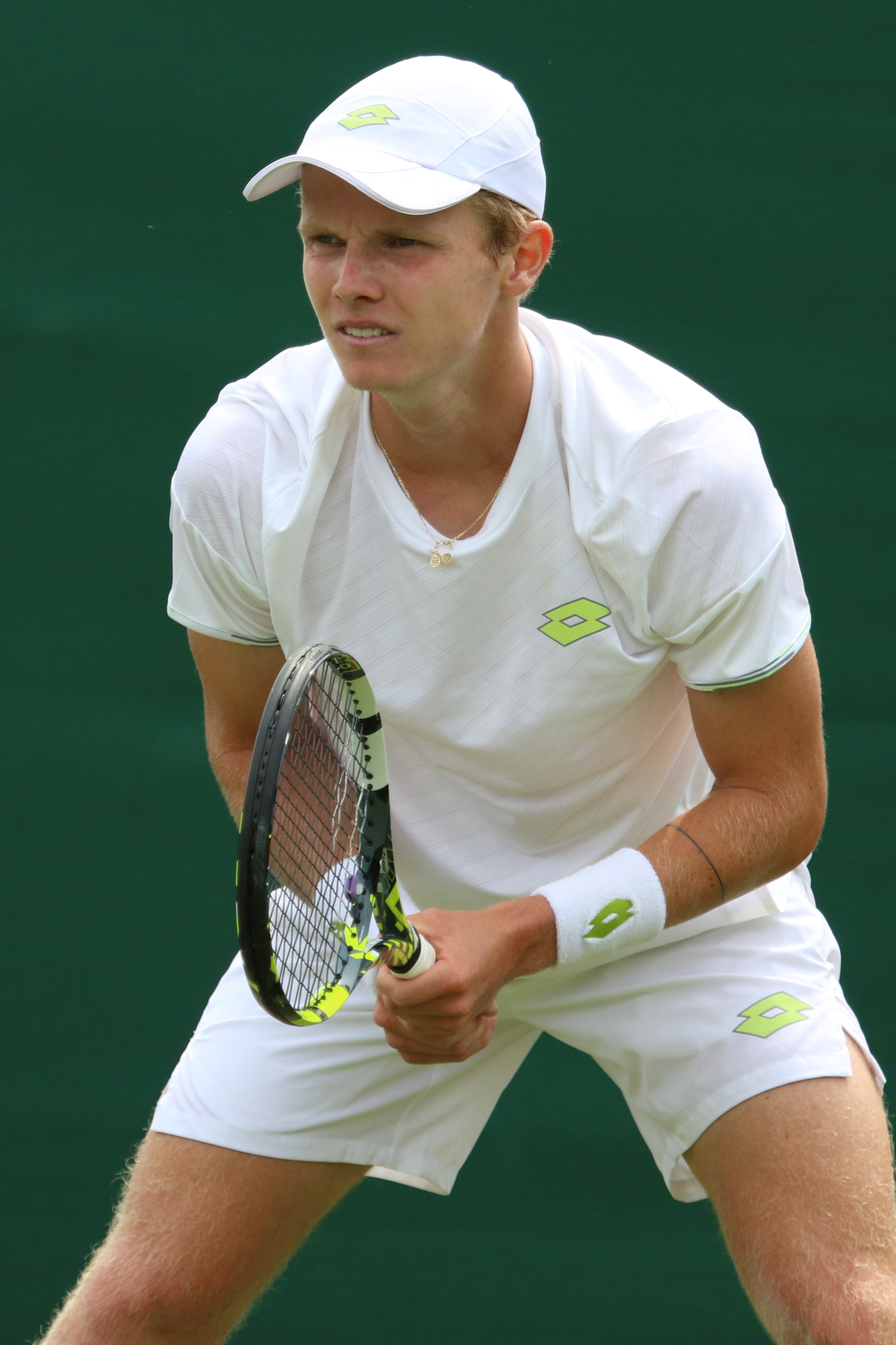
- De Jong at the 2023 Wimbledon Championships
- Country (sports): Netherlands
- Residence: Hoofddorp, Netherlands
- Born: 31 May 2000 (age 26) Haarlem, Netherlands
- Height: 1.80 m (5 ft 11 in)
- Plays: Right-handed (two-handed backhand)
- Coach: Bas Van Bentum, Jeroen Benard (-2024)
- Prize money: US $2,347,573

Singles
- Career record: 24–32
- Career titles: 0
- Highest ranking: No. 71 (5 January 2026)
- Current ranking: No. 73 (29 June 2026)

Grand Slam singles results
- Australian Open: 2R (2024)
- French Open: 4R (2026)
- Wimbledon: 2R (2025, 2026)
- US Open: 2R (2026)

Doubles
- Career record: 1–6
- Career titles: 0
- Highest ranking: No. 135 (23 May 2022)
- Current ranking: No. 1,100 (29 June 2026)

Grand Slam doubles results
- Australian Open: 1R (2026)
- French Open: 1R (2025)
- Wimbledon: 2R (2026)

Team competitions
- Davis Cup: F (2024)
- Last updated on: 1 July 2026.

Jesper de Jong (born 31 May 2000) is a Dutch professional tennis player. He has a career-high ATP singles ranking of world No. 71, achieved on 5 January 2026, and a doubles ranking of No. 135, achieved on 23 May 2022. He is the current Dutch No. 3 singles player.

De Jong has won three singles and seven doubles titles on the ATP Challenger Tour.

== Early life and background ==
De Jong was born in Haarlem and lives in Hoofddorp. He began playing tennis at the age of five. In his youth, he trained at Zwaanshoek Tennis & Padel. His tennis idol was Roger Federer.

De Jong and his grandfather, Jan, who died in October 2023, had dreamed of playing in a Grand Slam. After qualifying for the main draw of the 2024 Australian Open, de Jong got a tattoo to commemorate his late grandfather.

== Professional career ==
=== 2021: Maiden Challenger titles, top 250 debut ===
In March 2021, de Jong won his first Challenger doubles title at the Saint Petersburg Challenger II with Sem Verbeek. In May, he won his second Challenger doubles title, this time with Tim van Rijthoven, at the Open de Oeiras IV. The following month, he won his third doubles title at the Almaty Challenger with Vitaliy Sachko and reached a career-high doubles ranking of No. 204 on 14 June 2021.

De Jong won his first Challenger singles title at the Almaty Challenger II, sending him to a career-high singles ranking of No. 260 on 21 June 2021. At the Challenger Ciudad de Guayaquil in November, de Jong lost in the singles final to Alejandro Tabilo, but won the doubles title with Bart Stevens.

=== 2022–23: ATP Tour debut, top 150 in singles and in doubles ===
Following a semifinal showing at the Challenger in Traralgon, Australia in January, de Jong made his debut in the top 200 on 14 February 2022.

He made his ATP main draw doubles debut after qualifying as a pair partnering Sem Verbeek at the 2022 ABN AMRO World Tennis Tournament in Rotterdam. As a result, he reached a career-high doubles ranking of World No. 157 on 14 February 2022.

De Jong made his ATP singles debut at the 2022 Libéma Open as a wildcard. He was also awarded a wildcard in doubles partnering compatriot Bart Stevens. As a result, he reached the top 160 in the singles rankings on 13 June 2022.

He reached a career-high singles ranking of world No. 135 on 11 September 2023.

=== 2024: Grand Slam debut at the Australian Open ===
De Jong qualified for the 2024 Australian Open making his Grand Slam debut and defeated Pedro Cachin for his first Major win. He lost to eventual champion Jannik Sinner. He received a wildcard for his home tournament, the 2024 Rotterdam Open.

Ranked No. 177, he qualified for his second Grand Slam at the 2024 French Open. He defeated Jack Draper in the first round in five sets (his second tour-level and also his second Slam win) before losing to eventual champion Carlos Alcaraz in four sets in the second. He lifted his third Challenger title, the 2024 Emilia-Romagna Tennis Cup in Sassuolo, Italy. As a result, reached a new career-high ranking of No. 119 on 24 June 2024, and No. 103 more than a month later on 12 August 2024.

=== 2025–26: Major fourth round, Masters debut & third round, top 100 ===
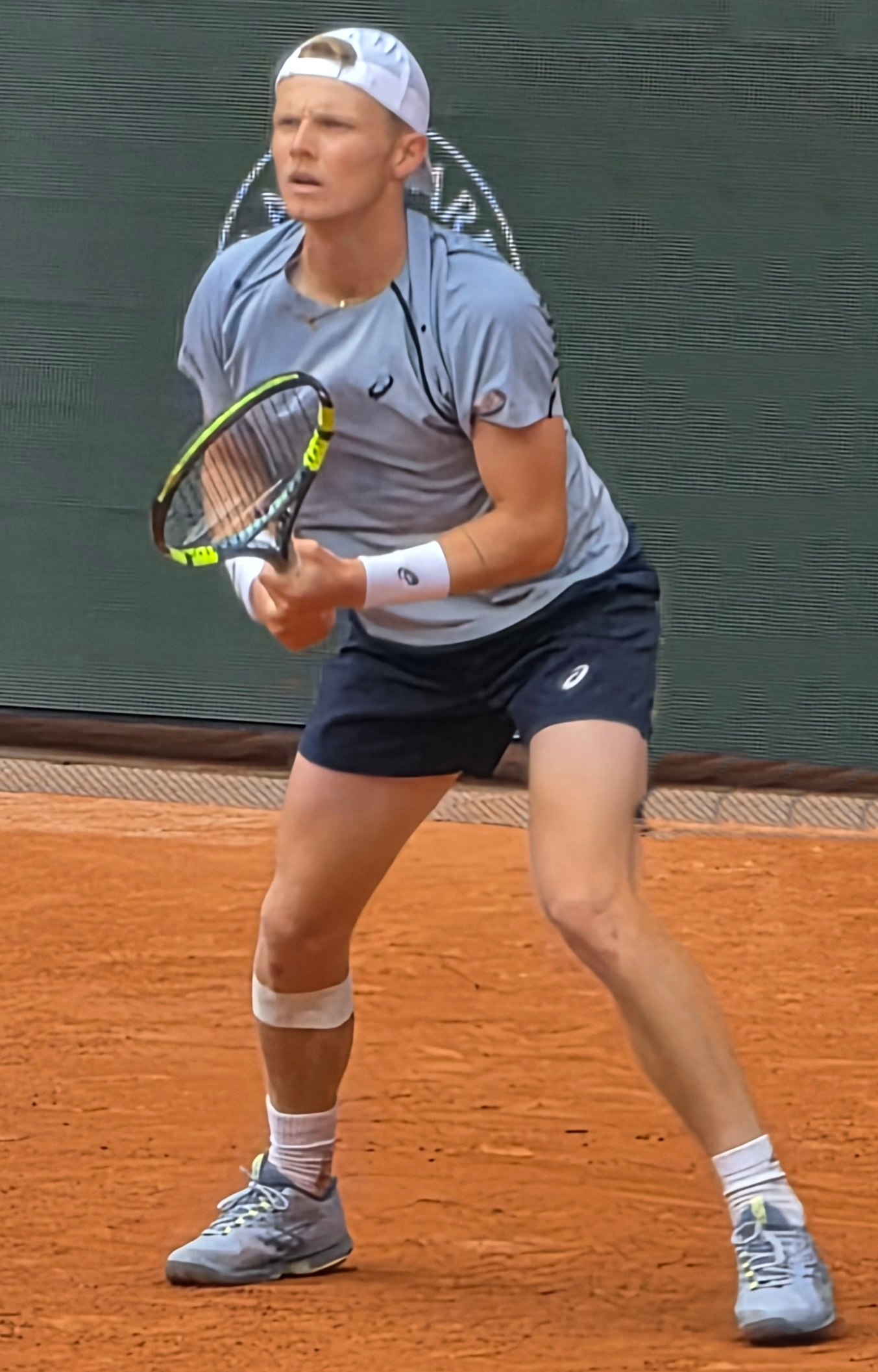
De Jong reached his first Grand Slam fourth round at the 2026 French Open

In January, in Montpellier, de Jong defeated wildcard Quentin Halys, then upset third seed Flavio Cobolli and fifth seed Tallon Griekspoor to reach his first ATP tour-level semifinal. Following a final showing at the 2025 Murcia Open, De Jong reached a career-high singles ranking in the top 100 of world No. 98 on 31 March 2025.

De Jong recorded his first ATP win as a top-100 player over Elliot Benchetrit in Marrakesh. De Jong made his Masters 1000 debut at the 2025 Italian Open in Rome, as a lucky loser, and recorded his first Masters win over qualifier Alexander Shevchenko. Next he upset 25th seed Alejandro Davidovich Fokina in straight sets to reach the third round of a Masters for the first time in his career.

In July, de Jong reached his first final on the ATP Tour at the Swedish Open, defeating second seed Tallon Griekspoor in the quarterfinal and fifth seed Camilo Ugo Carabelli in the semifinal. He lost to sixth seed Luciano Darderi in the final. As a result, De Jong reached a new career-high ranking of world No. 83 on 21 July 2025. The following week, de Jong reached the quarterfinal on the ATP Tour at the Croatia Open defeating fifth seed Mariano Navone in the second round, but lost to Carlos Taberner in the quarterfinal.

In October at the 2025 Rolex Shanghai Masters, De Jong reached the third round of a Masters for a second time in the season, upsetting 17th seed Jakub Menšík.

Ranked No. 106, De Jong entered the main draw of the 2026 French Open as a lucky loser. He defeated Stan Wawrinka in the first round (in his farewell match at the event), qualifier Federico Cina and 13th seed Karen Khachanov to reach a Grand Slam fourth round for the first time in his career. He became the third lucky loser in the Open Era to reach this stage at Roland Garros after Stanislav Birner (1978) and David Goffin (2012).

== Performance timeline ==
Key
W	F	SF	QF	#R	RR	Q#	P#	DNQ	A	Z#	PO	G	S	B	NMS	NTI	P	NH

(W) winner; (F) finalist; (SF) semifinalist; (QF) quarterfinalist; (#R) rounds 4, 3, 2, 1; (RR) round-robin stage; (Q#) qualification round; (P#) preliminary round; (DNQ) did not qualify; (A) absent; (Z#) Davis/Fed Cup Zonal Group (with number indication) or (PO) play-off; (G) gold, (S) silver or (B) bronze Olympic/Paralympic medal; (NMS) not a Masters tournament; (NTI) not a Tier I tournament; (P) postponed; (NH) not held; (SR) strike rate (events won / competed); (W–L) win–loss record.
To avoid confusion and double counting, these charts are updated at the conclusion of a tournament or when the player's participation has ended.

=== Singles ===
Current through the 2026 Wimbledon Championships.

Tournament	2022	2023	2024	2025	2026	SR	W–L	Win %
Grand Slam tournaments
Australian Open	Q3	A	2R	Q1	1R	0 / 2	1–2	33%
French Open	Q2	Q3	2R	2R	4R	0 / 3	5–3	63%
Wimbledon	Q1	Q2	Q2	2R	2R	0 / 2	2–2	50%
US Open	Q3	Q2	Q3	1R		0 / 1	0–1	0%
Win–loss	0-0	0–0	2–2	2–3	4–3	0 / 8	8–8	50%
ATP Tour Masters 1000
Indian Wells Open	A	A	A	A	A	0 / 0	0–0	–
Miami Open	A	A	A	A	A	0 / 0	0–0	–
Monte-Carlo Masters	A	A	A	A	Q1	0 / 0	0–0	–
Madrid Open	A	A	A	Q1	1R	0 / 1	0–1	0%
Italian Open	A	A	Q2	3R	1R	0 / 2	2–2	50%
Canadian Open	A	A	A	A		0 / 0	0–0	–
Cincinnati Open	A	A	A	A		0 / 0	0–0	–
Shanghai Masters	NH	A	A	3R		0 / 1	2–1	67%
Paris Masters	A	A	A	Q2		0 / 0	0–0	–
Win–loss	0–0	0–0	0–0	4–2	0–2	0 / 4	4–4	50%

== ATP Tour finals ==
=== Singles: 1 (runner-up) ===
Legend Grand Slam (–) ATP 1000 (–) ATP 500 (–) ATP 250 (0–1)	Finals by surface Hard (–) Clay (0–1) Grass (–)	Finals by setting Outdoor (0–1) Indoor (–)

Result	W–L	Date	Tournament	Tier	Surface	Opponent	Score
Loss	0–1	Jul 2025	Swedish Open, Sweden	ATP 250	Clay	(Italy) Luciano Darderi	4–6, 6–3, 3–6

== ATP Challenger and ITF Tour finals ==
=== Singles: 16 (8 titles, 8 runner-ups) ===
Legend ATP Challenger Tour (4–5) ITF WTT (4–3)	Finals by surface Hard (3–1) Clay (5–7)

Result	W–L	Date	Tournament	Tier	Surface	Opponent	Score
Loss	0–1	Jul 2019	M15 Marburg, Germany	WTT	Clay	(Germany) Louis Wessels	6–7^{(4–7)}, 6–7^{(5–7)}
Win	1–1	Aug 2019	M15 Oldenzaal, Netherlands	WTT	Clay	(Netherlands) Amadatus Admiraal	6–0, 6–4
Win	2–1	Sep 2019	M15 Haren, Netherlands	WTT	Clay	(Argentina) Juan Ignacio Galarza	7–5, 6–0
Win	3–1	Oct 2019	M25 Fort Worth, USA	WTT	Hard	(United Kingdom) Ryan Peniston	6–2, 6–0
Loss	3–2	Sep 2020	M25 Klosters, Switzerland	WTT	Clay	(Denmark) Holger Rune	4–6, 2–6
Win	1–0	Jun 2021	Almaty II, Kazakhstan	Challenger	Clay	(Chile) Tomás Barrios Vera	6–1, 6–2
Loss	1–1	Nov 2021	Guayaquil, Ecuador	Challenger	Clay	(Chile) Alejandro Tabilo	1–6, 5–7
Loss	3–3	Sep 2022	M15 Sintra, Portugal	WTT	Hard	(Morocco) Elliot Benchetrit	4–6, 1–6
Loss	1–2	Jan 2023	Tigre II, Argentina	Challenger	Clay	(Argentina) Juan Manuel Cerúndolo	3–6, 6–2, 2–6
Win	4–3	Mar 2023	M25 Quinta do Lago, Portugal	WTT	Hard	(Japan) Naoki Nakagawa	6–1, 5–7, 6–4
Loss	1–3	Apr 2023	Rome, Italy	Challenger	Clay	(India) Sumit Nagal	3–6, 2–6
Win	2–3	Aug 2023	Grodzisk Mazowiecki, Poland	Challenger	Hard	(Germany) Benjamin Hassan	6–3, 6–3
Win	3–3	Jun 2024	Sassuolo, Italy	Challenger	Clay	(Germany) Daniel Altmaier	7–6^{(7–5)}, 6–1
Loss	3–4	Oct 2024	Villa María, Argentina	Challenger	Clay	(Argentina) Camilo Ugo Carabelli	6–7^{(3–7)}, 6–3, 4–6
Loss	3–5	Mar 2025	Murcia, Spain	Challenger	Clay	(Spain) Carlos Taberner	6–7^{(3–7)}, 6–4, 2–6
Win	4–5	Jun 2026	Cattolica, Italy	Challenger	Clay	(Spain) Roberto Carballés Baena	6–3, 6–2

=== Doubles: 24 (15 titles, 10 runner-ups) ===
Legend ATP Challenger Tour (8–4) ITF WTT (7–6)	Finals by surface Hard (5–5) Clay (10–5)

Result	W–L	Date	Tournament	Tier	Surface	Partner	Opponents	Score
Loss	0–1	Mar 2019	M15 Doha, Qatar	WTT	Hard	(Belgium) Arnaud Bovy	(Belgium) Zizou Bergs (France) Geoffrey Blancaneaux	2–6, 4–6
Win	1–1	Mar 2019	M15 Doha, Qatar	WTT	Hard	(Netherlands) Michiel de Krom	(Belgium) Arnaud Bovy (Germany) Dominik Boehler	6–3, 6–3
Loss	1–2	Mar 2019	M15 Manama, Bahrain	WTT	Hard	(Netherlands) Sidane Pontjodikromo	(Russia) Alexander Igoshin (India) Vijay S. Prashanth	7–6^{(7–5)}, 6–7^{(5–7)}, [8–10]
Loss	1–3	Apr 2019	M15 Antalya, Turkey	WTT	Clay	(Netherlands) Sidane Pontjodikromo	(Russia) Bogdan Bobrov (Finland) Patrik Niklas-Salminen	2–6, 7–6^{(10–8)}, [7–10]
Win	2–3	Jun 2019	M15 Majadahonda, Spain	WTT	Clay	(Netherlands) Michiel de Krom	(Portugal) Frederico Gil (France) Florian Lakat	6–3, 6–3
Win	3–3	Jul 2019	M15 Den Haag, Netherlands	WTT	Clay	(Netherlands) Ryan Nijboer	(Netherlands) Michiel de Krom (Brazil) João Lucas Reis da Silva	6–1, 6–4
Loss	3–4	Aug 2019	M15 Brussels, Belgium	WTT	Clay	(Netherlands) Alec Deckers	(Dominican Republic) Nick Hardt (Germany) Luca Gelhardt	4–6, 4–6
Loss	3–5	Sep 2019	M15 Pajulahti, Finland	WTT	Hard	(Netherlands) Ryan Nijboer	(Monaco) Lucas Catarina (France) Baptiste Crepatte	4–6, 6–1, [5–10]
Win	4–5	Oct 2019	M25 Waco, USA	WTT	Hard	(Netherlands) Ryan Nijboer	(United Kingdom) Mark Whitehouse (Belgium) Michael Geerts	7–6^{(7–4)}, 6–1
Win	5–5	Jan 2020	M15 Monastir, Tunisia	WTT	Hard	(Netherlands) Bart Stevens	(United Kingdom) Luke Johnson (France) Hugo Voljacques	6–4, 3–6, [10–8]
Loss	5–6	Mar 2020	M25 Sunderland, United Kingdom	WTT	Hard	(Netherlands) Bart Stevens	(Poland) Szymon Walków (Poland) Jan Zieliński	4–6, 4–6
Win	6–6	Nov 2020	M25 Vale do Lobo, Portugal	WTT	Hard	(Netherlands) Jelle Sels	(Portugal) Nuno Borges (Portugal) Francisco Cabral	7–6^{(7–3)}, 5–7, [10–8]
Win	7–6	Mar 2023	M25 Palmanova, Spain	World Tennis Tour	Clay	(Netherlands) Max Houkes	(Romania) Alexandru Jecan (Germany) Kai Wehnelt	6–3, 6–4
Loss	0–1	Jul 2019	Amersfoort, Netherlands	Challenger	Clay	(Netherlands) Ryan Nijboer	(Finland) Harri Heliövaara (Finland) Emil Ruusuvuori	3–6, 4–6
Loss	0–2	Mar 2021	St. Petersburg, Russia	Challenger	Hard	(Netherlands) Sem Verbeek	(Ecuador) Roberto Quiroz (United States) Christopher Eubanks	4–6, 3–6
Win	1–2	Mar 2021	St. Petersburg II, Russia	Challenger	Hard	(Netherlands) Sem Verbeek	(Russia) Konstantin Kravchuk (Kazakhstan) Denis Yevseyev	6–1, 3–6, [10–5]
Win	2–2	May 2021	Oeiras IV, Portugal	Challenger	Clay	(Netherlands) Tim van Rijthoven	(Germany) Julian Lenz (Ecuador) Roberto Quiroz	6–1, 7–6^{(7–3)}
Win	3–2	Jun 2021	Almaty, Kazakhstan	Challenger	Clay	(Ukraine) Vitaliy Sachko	(Ukraine) Vladyslav Manafov (Russia) Evgenii Tiurnev	7–6^{(7–4)}, 6–1
Loss	3–3	Sep 2021	Braga, Portugal	Challenger	Clay	(Netherlands) Bart Stevens	(Portugal) Nuno Borges (Portugal) Francisco Cabral	3–6, 7–6 ^{(7–4)}, [5–10]
Win	4–3	Nov 2021	Guayaquil, Ecuador	Challenger	Clay	(Netherlands) Bart Stevens	(Ecuador) Diego Hidalgo (Colombia) Cristian Rodríguez	7–5, 6–2
Win	5–3	Mar 2022	Santa Cruz de la Sierra II, Bolivia	Challenger	Clay	(Netherlands) Bart Stevens	(Colombia) Nicolás Barrientos (Mexico) Miguel Ángel Reyes-Varela	6–4, 3–6, [10–6]
Win	6–3	Apr 2022	Rome, Italy	Challenger	Clay	(Netherlands) Bart Stevens	(France) Sadio Doumbia (France) Fabien Reboul	3–6, 7–5, [10–8]
Win	7–3	Oct 2022	Lima II, Peru	Challenger	Clay	(Netherlands) Max Houkes	(Argentina) Guido Andreozzi (Argentina) Guillermo Durán	7–6^{(8–6)}, 3–6, [12–10]
Win	8–3	Mar 2025	Kigali, Rwanda	Challenger	Clay	(Netherlands) Max Houkes	(France) Geoffrey Blancaneaux (Czech Republic) Zdeněk Kolář	6–3, 7–5
Loss	8–4	Mar 2025	Murcia, Spain	Challenger 75	Clay	(Netherlands) Mats Hermans	(France) Grégoire Jacq (Brazil) Orlando Luz	7–5, 6–1

== Record against top 10 players ==
De Jong's record against players who has been ranked in the top 10 in their career, with those who are active in boldface. Only ATP Tour main draw matches are considered:

Player	Record	Win %	Hard	Clay	Grass	Last match
Number 1 ranked players						
(Spain) **Carlos Alcaraz**	0–1	0%	–	0–1	–	Lost (3–6, 4–6, 6–2, 2–6) at 2024 French Open
Number 2 ranked players						
(Italy) **Jannik Sinner**	0–1	0%	0–1	–		Lost (2–6, 2–6, 2–6) at 2024 Australian Open
Number 3 ranked players						
(Canada) **Milos Raonic**	0–1	0%	0–1	–		Lost (6–7^{(5–7)}, 4–6) at 2024 Rotterdam
**Total**	**0–3**	**0%**	**0–2 (0%)**	**0–1 (0%)**	**0–0 ( – )**	*** Statistics correct as of 29 May 2024.**
