= Challenger di Roseto degli Abruzzi =

Tennis tournament in Italy

- 2023 Challenger di Roseto degli Abruzzi

Defunct tennis tournament
- Event name: Challenger di Roseto degli Abruzzi
- Location: Roseto degli Abruzzi, Italy
- Venue: Tennis Club Roseto
- Category: ATP Challenger 75
- Surface: Clay
- Draw: 32S/24Q/16D
- Prize money: €45,730 (2022)
- Website: tennisclubroseto.it

The Challenger di Roseto degli Abruzzi was a professional tennis tournament played on clay courts. It was part of the Association of Tennis Professionals (ATP) Challenger Tour. It was held in Roseto degli Abruzzi, Italy, in 2022 and 2023.

== Past finals ==
=== Singles ===
Year	Champion	Runner-up	Score
2023	(Austria) Filip Misolic	(Belgium) Raphaël Collignon	4–6, 7–5, 7–6^{(8–6)}
2022 (2)	(France) Manuel Guinard	(Chinese Taipei) Tseng Chun-hsin	6–1, 6–2
2022 (1)	(Spain) Carlos Taberner	(Portugal) Nuno Borges	6–2, 6–3

=== Doubles ===
Year	Champions	Runners-up	Score
2023	(France) Dan Added (France) Titouan Droguet	(Italy) Jacopo Berrettini (Italy) Andrea Pellegrino	6–2, 1–6, [12–10]
2022 (2)	(Italy) Franco Agamenone (France) Manuel Guinard	(Serbia) Ivan Sabanov (Serbia) Matej Sabanov	7–6^{(7–2)}, 7–6^{(7–3)}
2022 (1)	(Monaco) Hugo Nys (Poland) Jan Zieliński	(Czech Republic) Roman Jebavý (Austria) Philipp Oswald	7–6^{(7–2)}, 4–6, [10–3]
