= Carlos Taberner =

Spanish tennis player (born 1997)

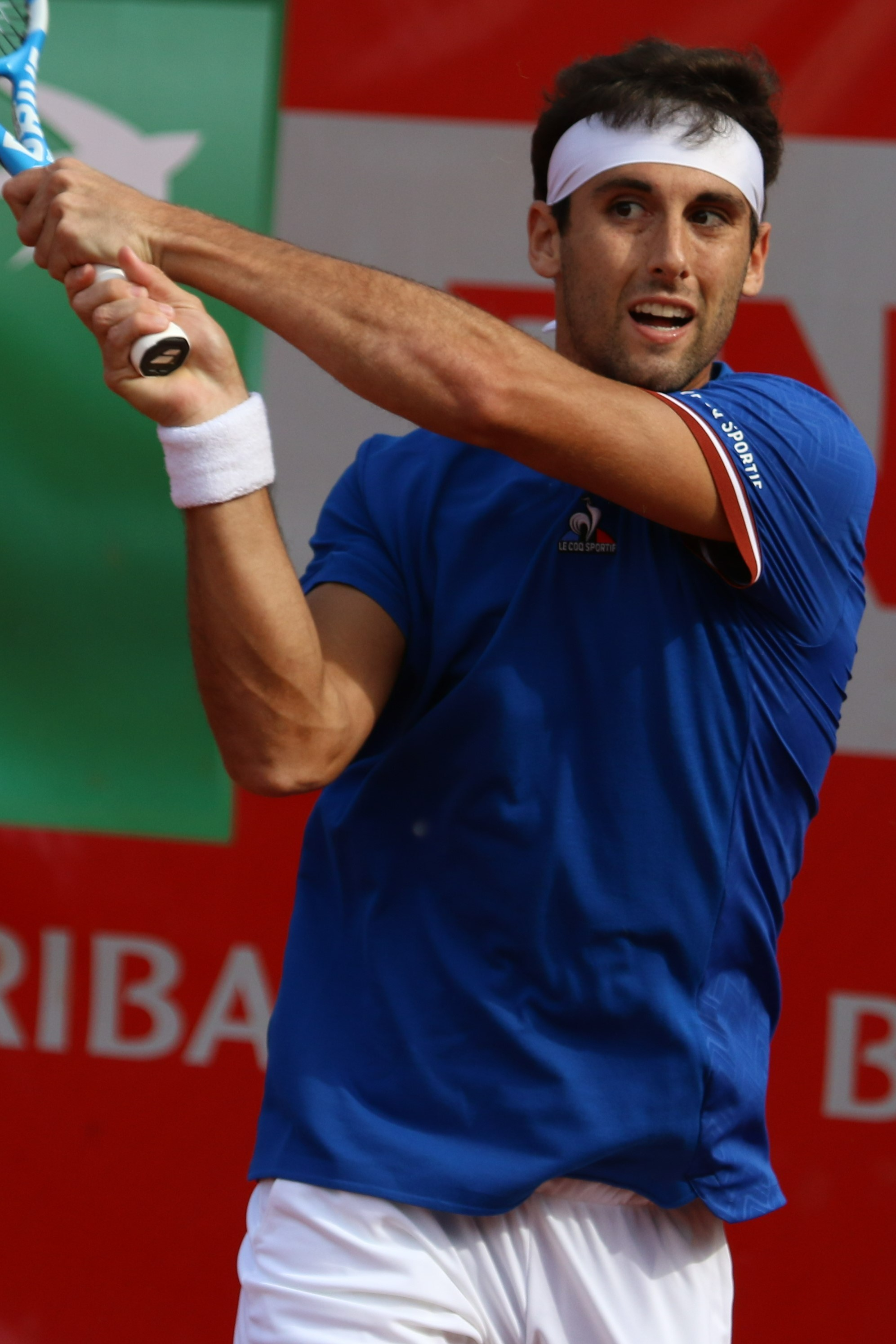
- Taberner at the 2022 BNP Paribas Primrose Bordeaux
- Country (sports): Spain
- Residence: Valencia, Spain
- Born: 8 August 1997 (age 29) Valencia, Spain
- Height: 1.83 m (6 ft 0 in)
- Turned pro: 2015
- Plays: Right-handed (two-handed backhand)
- Coach: GTennis Academy
- Prize money: US $1,473,034

Singles
- Career record: 18–29
- Career titles: 0
- Highest ranking: No. 83 (4 August 2025)
- Current ranking: No. 100 (9 February 2026)

Grand Slam singles results
- Australian Open: 1R (2022, 2026)
- French Open: 1R (2018, 2021, 2022)
- Wimbledon: 1R (2022)
- US Open: 1R (2021, 2026)

Doubles
- Career record: 0–7
- Career titles: 0
- Highest ranking: No. 337 (18 September 2017)

Grand Slam doubles results
- Wimbledon: 1R (2022)
- Last updated on: 9 February 2026.

Carlos Taberner Segarra (Spanish pronunciation: [ˈkaɾlos taβeɾˈneɾ]; born 8 August 1997) is a Spanish professional tennis player. He has a career-high ATP singles ranking of world No. 83, achieved on 4 August 2025 and a doubles ranking of No. 337, achieved on 18 September 2017.

He has reached 23 career ITF singles finals, with a record of 12 wins and 18 losses, including nine Challengers titles. Additionally, he has reached seven career ITF doubles finals with a record of 4 wins and 3 losses including a Challenger doubles title in San Benedetto.

== Career ==
Taberner is a clay court specialist and has won all his titles on the surface at: Iași, Antalya, Aix-en-Provence, Lošinj, Roseto, Augsburg, Todi, Murcia, Sassuolo.

=== 2018: ATP and Grand Slam debut ===
Taberner made his ATP Tour debut at the 2018 Open Sud de France in Marseille where he advanced through 2 qualifying matches to reach the main draw. In qualifying, he defeated Benjamin Bonzi and Marco Trungelliti, where he then won his first round match against Norbert Gombos in two tie-breakers 7–6^{(7–5)}, 7–6^{(7–1)}. His run would end in the second round, as he was defeated by Lucas Pouille in straight sets 1–6, 2–6.

He made his Grand Slam debut in the main draw at the 2018 French Open as a qualifier where he lost to Stefanos Tsitsipas.

=== 2021: Challenger success, top 100, Masters debut & first win & ATP quarterfinal ===
He also qualified for the 2021 French Open where he lost to Roman Safiullin.

He won his third Challenger title at the 2021 Open du Pays d'Aix defeating Manuel Guinard. As a result, he reached a career-high ranking of World No. 113 on 21 June 2021.

He entered the main draw as a direct entry for the first time at the US Open on his debut at this Major. In September, he reached his first ATP Tour quarterfinal at the Nur-Sultan Open. In October, he also entered directly into the main draw for his second Masters 1000 of the season and in his career at the 2021 BNP Paribas Open in Indian Wells and made it to the second round, recording his first win at this level by defeating fellow Spaniard Jaume Munar. He won his fourth Challenger at the 2021 Lošinj Open and made his debut in the top 100 at World No. 93 on 25 October 2021.

=== 2022-2023: Second ATP 500 win, Wimbledon and Top 85 debuts ===
He made his debut at the 2022 Australian Open losing to Dominik Koepfer.

He earned his first and second ATP wins of the season at the 2022 Córdoba Open against 5th seeded Argentinian Federico Delbonis and at the 2022 Chile Open against another Argentine Juan Manuel Cerundolo.

At the 2022 Barcelona Open Banc Sabadell he earned as a qualifier his second ATP 500 (after the Hamburg European Open in 2021) and biggest win thus far in the season where he bagelled Sebastian Korda in the second set. He lost to Félix Auger-Aliassime. He reached the top 85 on 23 May 2022.

In June 2022, Taberner made also his debut at the 2022 Wimbledon Championships where he lost to 15th seed Reilly Opelka.

In February 2023, he made the main draw as lucky loser in Santiago, Chile after the withdrawal of Bernabé Zapata Miralles. In August, he won his sixth Challenger at the 2023 Schwaben Open in Augsburg, Germany.

=== 2024-2025: First Masters clay win & ATP final, back to top 100 ===
Taberner dropped out of the top 400 on 18 March 2024. The following month, he qualified for the main draw at the 2024 Țiriac Open having entered the qualifying competition as an alternate. He returned to the top 205 on 19 August 2024, following a Challenger final in Cordenons, and his seventh Challenger title at the 2024 Internazionali di Tennis Città di Todi, both in Italy. A month later he returned to the top 200 at world No. 198 on 23 September 2024.

Taberner won his eighth Challenger at the 2025 Murcia Open and returned to the top 150 in the rankings on 31 March 2025. He qualified for the main draw at the Masters 1000, the 2025 Italian Open for the first time since 2021, and defeated Aleksandar Kovacevic. Following lifting the trophy at the Sassuolo Challenger, Taberner returned to the top 100 on 23 June 2025.

At the 2025 Croatia Open Umag Taberner reached his first ATP final, upsetting top seed and defending champion Francisco Cerundolo, in a close to three and a half hours match, his first top 20 win, Jesper de Jong, and fourth seed Damir Džumhur. As a result he reached a new career-high in the top 85 at world No. 83 in the singles rankings on 4 August 2025.

== Performance timelines ==
Key
W	F	SF	QF	#R	RR	Q#	DNQ	A	NH

(W) winner; (F) finalist; (SF) semifinalist; (QF) quarterfinalist; (#R) rounds 4, 3, 2, 1; (RR) round-robin stage; (Q#) qualification round; (DNQ) did not qualify; (A) absent; (NH) not held; (SR) strike rate (events won / competed); (W–L) win–loss record.
To avoid confusion and double counting, these charts are updated at the conclusion of a tournament or when the player's participation has ended.

=== Singles ===
Tournament	2017	2018	2019	2020	2021	2022	2023	2024	2025	SR	W–L	Win %
Grand Slam tournaments
Australian Open	A	Q2	A	Q1	Q2	1R	Q2	A	Q2	0 / 1	0–1	0%
French Open	A	1R	A	Q2	1R	1R	A	A	Q1	0 / 3	0–3	0%
Wimbledon	A	A	A	NH	Q2	1R			Q1	0 / 1	0–1	0%
US Open	A	A	A	A	1R	Q2			Q1	0 / 1	0–1	0%
Win–loss	0–0	0–1	0–0	0–0	0–2	0–3	0–0	0–0	0–0	0 / 6	0–6	0%
ATP Tour Masters 1000
Indian Wells	A	A	A	NH	2R	A				0 / 1	1–1	50%
Monte-Carlo Masters	A	A	A	NH	A	Q1				0 / 0	0–0	–
Madrid Open	Q1	A	A	NH	1R	A				0 / 1	0–1	0%
Italian Open	A	A	A	A	A	A			2R	0 / 1	1–1	50%
Paris Masters	A	A	A	A	Q1	A				0 / 0	0–0	–
Win–loss	0–0	0–0	0–0	0–0	1–2	0–0	0–0	0–0	1–1	0 / 3	2–3	40%
Career statistics
Overall win–loss	0–0	1–2	0–0	1–2	6–8	5–11	0–1	0–1	1–1	0 / 26	14–26	35%
Year-end ranking	185	283	190	143	101	168	363	195	103	$1,145,142		

== ATP Tour finals ==
=== Singles: 1 (runner-up) ===
Legend Grand Slam (0–0) ATP 1000 (0–0) ATP 500 (0–0) ATP 250 (0–1)	Finals by surface Hard (0–0) Clay (0–1) Grass (0–0)	Finals by setting Outdoor (0–1) Indoor (0–0)

Result	W–L	Date	Tournament	Tier	Surface	Opponent	Score
Loss	0–1	Jul 2025	Croatia Open, Croatia	ATP 250	Clay	(Italy) Luciano Darderi	3–6, 3–6

== ATP Challenger and ITF Futures finals ==
=== Singles: 23 (12 titles, 11 runner-ups ) ===
Legend ATP Challenger Tour (9–5) ITF Futures (3–6)	Finals by surface Hard (0–0) Clay (12–11)

Result	W–L	Date	Tournament	Tier	Surface	Opponent	Score
Loss	0–1	Feb 2016	Spain F3, Paguera	Futures	Clay	(Norway) Casper Ruud	6–2, 6–7^{(11–13)}, 0–6
Loss	0–2	May 2016	Spain F13, Valldoreix	Futures	Clay	(Spain) Albert Alcaraz Ivorra	2–6, 3–6
Loss	0–3	May 2016	Tunisia F20, Hammamet	Futures	Clay	(Chile) Cristian Garín	3–6, 6–7^{(1–7)}
Win	1–3	Jun 2016	Romania F7, Bucharest	Futures	Clay	(Argentina) Mariano Kestelboim	6–1, 5–7, 6–4
Win	2–3	Jul 2016	Spain F22, Denia	Futures	Clay	(Spain) Jaume Munar	4–6, 7–5, 7–5
Loss	2–4	Jul 2016	Spain F23, Xàtiva	Futures	Clay	(Spain) Pedro Martínez	6–2, 1–6, 4–6
Loss	2–5	Oct 2016	Spain F35, La Vall d'Uixó	Futures	Clay	(Russia) Ivan Gakhov	2–6, 2–6
Win	3–5	Nov 2016	Tunisia F33, Hammamet	Futures	Clay	(Portugal) Gonçalo Oliveira	6–4, 7–5
Loss	3–6	Jul 2017	Spain F20, Getxo	Futures	Clay	(Spain) Bernabé Zapata Miralles	3–6, 6–3, 3–6
Loss	0–1	Sep 2017	Banja Luka Challenger, Bosnia and Herzegovina	Challenger	Clay	(Germany) Maximilian Marterer	1–6, 2–6
Loss	0–2	Sep 2017	Sibiu Open, Romania	Challenger	Clay	(Germany) Cedrik-Marcel Stebe	3–6, 3–6
Win	1–2	Sep 2020	Iași Open, Romania	Challenger	Clay	(France) Mathias Bourgue	6–4, 7–6^{(7–4)}
Loss	1–3	Nov 2020	Maia Challenger, Portugal	Challenger	Clay	(Portugal) Pedro Sousa	0–6, 7–5, 2–6
Win	2–3	Feb 2021	Antalya Challenger II, Turkey	Challenger	Clay	(Spain) Jaume Munar	6–4, 6–1
Win	3–3	Jun 2021	Open du Pays d'Aix, France	Challenger	Clay	(France) Manuel Guinard	6–2, 6–2
Win	4–3	Oct 2021	Lošinj Open, Croatia	Challenger	Clay	(Italy) Marco Cecchinato	walkover
Win	5–3	Mar 2022	Challenger di Roseto degli Abruzzi, Italy	Challenger	Clay	(Portugal) Nuno Borges	6–2, 6–3
Win	6–3	Aug 2023	Schwaben Open, Germany	Challenger	Clay	(Spain) Oriol Roca Batalla	6–4, 6–4
Loss	6–4	Aug 2024	Serena Wines 1881 Cup, Cordenons, Italy	Challenger	Clay	(Lithuania) Vilius Gaubas	6–2, 2–6, 4–6
Win	7–4	Aug 2024	Internazionali Città di Todi, Italy	Challenger	Clay	(Argentina) Santiago Rodríguez Taverna	6–4, 6–3
Loss	7–5	Aug 2024	CT Porto Cup, Portugal	Challenger	Clay	(Bulgaria) Adrian Andreev	3–6, 0–6
Win	8–5	Mar 2025	Murcia Open, Spain	Challenger	Clay	(Netherlands) Jesper de Jong	7–6^{(7–3)}, 4–6, 6–2
Win	9–5	Jun 2025	Emilia-Romagna Open, Sassuolo, Italy	Challenger	Clay	(Serbia) Dušan Lajović	7–6^{(7–1)}, 6–2

=== Doubles: 7 (4 titles, 3 runner-ups) ===
Legend ATP Challenger Tour (1–0) ITF Futures (3–3)	Finals by surface Hard (0–0) Clay (4–3)

Result	W–L	Date	Tournament	Tier	Surface	Partner	Opponents	Score
Win	1–0	Nov 2015	Turkey F47, Antalya	Futures	Clay	(Japan) Kento Yamada	(Netherlands) Romano Frantzen (Netherlands) Alban Meuffels	6–2, 6–2
Loss	1–1	Feb 2016	Spain F2, Paguera	Futures	Clay	(Japan) Kento Yamada	(Bosnia and Herzegovina) Tomislav Brkić (Poland) Kamil Majchrzak	3–6, 4–6
Loss	1–2	Feb 2016	Spain F5, Cartagena	Futures	Clay	(Japan) Kento Yamada	(Romania) Vasile Antonescu (Romania) Alexandru Jecan	4–6, 1–6
Loss	1–3	May 2016	Tunisia F19, Hammamet	Futures	Clay	(Japan) Kento Yamada	(Chile) Cristóbal Saavedra Corvalán (Uruguay) Marcel Felder	3–6, 0–6
Win	2–3	Jul 2016	Spain F22, Denia	Futures	Clay	(Spain) Marc Giner	(Spain) Sergio Martos Gornés (Spain) Adrià Mas Mascolo	6–3, 6–1
Win	3–3	Oct 2016	Spain F35, La Vall d'Uixó	Futures	Clay	(Russia) Ivan Gakhov	(Spain) Javier Barranco Cosano (Italy) Raúl Brancaccio	7–6^{(7–2)}, 3–6, [10–7]
Win	1–0	Jul 2017	San Benedetto Tennis Cup, Italy	Challenger	Clay	(Spain) Pol Toledo Bagué	(Italy) Flavio Cipolla (Romania) Adrian Ungur	7–5, 6–4

== Record against top 10 players ==
Taberner's record against players who have been ranked in the top 10, with those who are active in boldface. Only ATP Tour main draw matches are considered:

Player	Record	Win %	Hard	Clay	Grass	Last match
Number 3 ranked players						
(Greece) **Stefanos Tsitsipas**	0–1	0%	–	0–1	–	Lost (5–7, 7–6^{(7–5)}, 4–6, 3–6) at 2018 French Open
Number 5 ranked players						
(Russia) **Andrey Rublev**	0–1	0%	0–1	–	–	Lost (3–6, 4–6) at 2021 Indian Wells
Number 6 ranked players						
(Canada) **Félix Auger-Aliassime**	0–2	0%	–	0–2	–	Lost (6–1, 2–6, 2–6) at 2022 Estoril
Number 7 ranked players						
(Spain) **Fernando Verdasco**	1–0	100%	–	1–0	–	Won (4–6, 6–1, 6–4) at 2020 Córdoba
Number 9 ranked players						
(Italy) **Fabio Fognini**	0–1	0%	–	0–1	–	Lost (6–7^{(4–7)}, 6–2, 3–6) at 2021 Madrid
Number 10 ranked players						
(Spain) **Pablo Carreño Busta**	0–1	0%	–	0–1	–	Lost (5–7, 3–6) at 2021 Hamburg
(France) **Lucas Pouille**	0–1	0%	0–1	–	–	Lost (1–6, 2–6) at 2018 Montpellier
**Total**	**1–7**	**12.5%**	**0–2** **(0%)**	**1–5** **(17%)**	**0–0** **( – )**	*** Statistics correct as of 1 May 2022**
