= 2020 Campeonato Internacional de Tênis de Campinas =

- Date: 30 November – 6 December
- Edition: 9th
- Surface: Clay
- Location: Campinas, Brazil

Champions

Singles
- (Argentina) Francisco Cerúndolo

Doubles
- (France) Sadio Doumbia / (France) Fabien Reboul
← 2019 ·	Campeonato Internacional de Tênis de Campinas	· 2021 →

The 2020 Campeonato Internacional de Tênis de Campinas was a professional tennis tournament played on clay courts. It was the ninth edition of the tournament which was part of the 2020 ATP Challenger Tour. It took place in Campinas, Brazil between 30 November and 6 December 2020.

== Singles main-draw entrants ==
=== Seeds ===
Country	Player	Rank^{1}	Seed
ESP	Roberto Carballés Baena	102	1
BRA	Thiago Seyboth Wild	115	2
ARG	Facundo Bagnis	125	3
COL	Daniel Elahi Galán	129	4
EGY	Mohamed Safwat	156	5
ECU	Emilio Gómez	159	6
ARG	Francisco Cerúndolo	162	7
KAZ	Dmitry Popko	172	8

- ^{1} Rankings as of 23 November 2020.

=== Other entrants ===
The following players received wildcards into the singles main draw:

- (Brazil) Oscar José Gutierrez
- (Brazil) Matheus Pucinelli de Almeida
- (Brazil) João Lucas Reis da Silva

The following players received entry into the singles main draw as special exempts:

- (Ukraine) Vitaliy Sachko
- (Argentina) Thiago Agustín Tirante

The following player received entry into the singles main draw as an alternate:

- (Brazil) Orlando Luz

The following players received entry from the qualifying draw:

- (Argentina) Sebastián Báez
- (Spain) Carlos Gómez-Herrera
- (Netherlands) Jelle Sels
- (Argentina) Camilo Ugo Carabelli

== Champions ==
=== Singles ===
- (Argentina) Francisco Cerúndolo def. (Spain) Roberto Carballés Baena 6–4, 3–6, 6–3.

=== Doubles ===
- (France) Sadio Doumbia / (France) Fabien Reboul def. (Venezuela) Luis David Martínez / (Brazil) Felipe Meligeni Alves 6–7^{(7–9)}, 7–5, [10–7].
