= 2020 Campeonato Internacional de Tênis de Campinas – Singles =

Singles
- 2020 Campeonato Internacional de Tênis de Campinas

Final
- Champion: (Argentina) Francisco Cerúndolo
- Runner-up: (Spain) Roberto Carballés Baena
- Score: 6–4, 3–6, 6–3

Events
| Singles | Doubles |
| ← 2019 · | Campeonato Internacional de Tênis de Campinas | · 2021 → |

Juan Pablo Varillas was the defending champion but chose not to participate.

Francisco Cerúndolo won the title after defeating Roberto Carballés Baena 6–4, 3–6, 6–3 in the final.

== Seeds ==
1. (Spain) Roberto Carballés Baena (final)
2. (Brazil) Thiago Seyboth Wild (first round)
3. (Argentina) Facundo Bagnis (quarterfinals)
4. (Colombia) Daniel Elahi Galán (semifinals)
5. (Egypt) Mohamed Safwat (quarterfinals)
6. (Ecuador) Emilio Gómez (second round)
7. (Argentina) Francisco Cerúndolo (champion)
8. (Kazakhstan) Dmitry Popko (quarterfinals)

== Draw ==
=== Key ===
- Q = Qualifier
- WC = Wild card
- LL = Lucky loser
- Alt = Alternate
- SE = Special exempt
- PR = Protected ranking
- ITF = ITF entry
- JE = Junior exempt
- w/o = Walkover
- r = Retired
- d = Defaulted
- SR = Special ranking

=== Finals ===
Semifinals
1 | (Spain) Roberto Carballés Baena | 6 | 6
4 | (Colombia) Daniel Elahi Galán | 4 | 2
7 | (Argentina) Francisco Cerúndolo | 6 | 6
(Brazil) Felipe Meligeni Alves | 1 | 4

Final
1 | (Spain) Roberto Carballés Baena | 4 | 6 | 3
7 | (Argentina) Francisco Cerúndolo | 6 | 3 | 6

=== Top half ===
First round
1 | (Spain) R Carballés Baena | 6 | 6
(Spain) R Ortega Olmedo | 4 | 0
(Czech Republic) V Kopřiva | 7 | 5
(Russia) T Gabashvili | 5 | 3^{r}
Q | (Argentina) C Ugo Carabelli | 1 | 4
(Brazil) T Bellucci | 6 | 6
(Chile) MT Barrios Vera | 7 | 2 | 2
5 | (Egypt) M Safwat | 5 | 6 | 6
4 | (Colombia) DE Galán | 6 | 6
Q | (Netherlands) J Sels | 2 | 3
WC | (Brazil) Oscar José Gutierrez | 5 | 6 | 1
Q | (Argentina) S Báez | 7 | 1 | 6
(Argentina) JP Ficovich | 6 | 3 | 6^{5}
(Brazil) J Menezes | 4 | 6 | 7^{7}
SE | (Argentina) TA Tirante | 7 | 5 | 2
8 | (Kazakhstan) D Popko | 5 | 7 | 6

Second round
1 | (Spain) R Carballés Baena | 4 | 6 | 7
(Czech Republic) V Kopřiva | 6 | 3 | 5
(Brazil) T Bellucci | 6 | 4 | 3
5 | (Egypt) M Safwat | 2 | 6 | 6
4 | (Colombia) DE Galán | 6 | 3 | 7^{7}
Q | (Argentina) S Báez | 3 | 6 | 6^{5}
(Brazil) J Menezes | 2 | 5
8 | (Kazakhstan) D Popko | 6 | 7

Quarterfinals
1 | (Spain) R Carballés Baena | 6 | 1 | 6
5 | (Egypt) M Safwat | 4 | 6 | 0
4 | (Colombia) DE Galán | 6 | 6
8 | (Kazakhstan) D Popko | 3 | 3

Semifinals
1 | (Spain) R Carballés Baena | 6 | 6
4 | (Colombia) DE Galán | 4 | 2

=== Bottom half ===
First round
7 | (Argentina) F Cerúndolo | 6 | 6
(Brazil) P Sakamoto | 1 | 3
(Brazil) G Clezar | 4 | 4
(Argentina) F Mena | 6 | 6
(Argentina) R Olivo | 6^{3} | 6 | 6
SE | (Ukraine) V Sachko | 7^{7} | 0 | 4
WC | (Brazil) JL Reis da Silva | 7^{7} | 4 | 4
3 | (Argentina) F Bagnis | 6^{5} | 6 | 6
6 | (Ecuador) E Gómez | 6 | 7^{12}
(Ecuador) R Quiroz | 3 | 6^{10}
(Brazil) F Meligeni Alves | 6 | 7^{7}
Q | (Spain) C Gómez-Herrera | 4 | 6^{3}
WC | (Brazil) M Pucinelli de Almeida | 6^{3} | 2
Alt | (Brazil) O Luz | 7^{7} | 6
(Chile) A Tabilo | 6 | 6
2 | (Brazil) T Seyboth Wild | 1 | 3

Second round
7 | (Argentina) F Cerúndolo | 4 | 7 | 7^{7}
(Argentina) F Mena | 6 | 5 | 6^{0}
(Argentina) R Olivo | 1 | 5
3 | (Argentina) F Bagnis | 6 | 7
6 | (Ecuador) E Gómez | 4 | 4
(Brazil) F Meligeni Alves | 6 | 6
Alt | (Brazil) O Luz
(Chile) A Tabilo | w/o

Quarterfinals
7 | (Argentina) F Cerúndolo | 6 | 7
3 | (Argentina) F Bagnis | 2 | 5
(Brazil) F Meligeni Alves | 7 | 6
(Chile) A Tabilo | 5 | 1

Semifinals
7 | (Argentina) F Cerúndolo | 6 | 6
(Brazil) F Meligeni Alves | 1 | 4
