= 2021 Campeonato Internacional de Tênis de Campinas =

- Date: 15–21 November
- Edition: 10th
- Surface: Clay
- Location: Campinas, Brazil

Champions

Singles
- (Argentina) Sebastián Báez

Doubles
- (Brazil) Rafael Matos / (Brazil) Felipe Meligeni Alves
← 2020 ·	Campeonato Internacional de Tênis de Campinas	· 2022 →

The 2021 Campeonato Internacional de Tênis de Campinas was a professional tennis tournament played on clay courts. It was the tenth edition of the tournament which was part of the 2021 ATP Challenger Tour. It took place in Campinas, Brazil between 15 and 21 November 2021.

== Singles main-draw entrants ==
=== Seeds ===
Country	Player	Rank^{1}	Seed
ARG	Federico Coria	70	1
ESP	Jaume Munar	89	2
ARG	Juan Manuel Cerúndolo	91	3
BRA	Thiago Monteiro	95	4
URU	Pablo Cuevas	97	5
COL	Daniel Elahi Galán	102	6
ARG	Sebastián Báez	111	7
ARG	Francisco Cerúndolo	112	8

- ^{1} Rankings as of 8 November 2021.

=== Other entrants ===
The following players received wildcards into the singles main draw:

- (Brazil) Matheus Bueres
- (Brazil) Gustavo Heide
- (Brazil) Gilbert Klier Júnior

The following players received entry into the singles main draw as alternates:

- (Brazil) Orlando Luz
- (Brazil) Matheus Pucinelli de Almeida

The following players received entry from the qualifying draw:

- (Peru) Nicolás Álvarez
- (Spain) Nicolás Álvarez Varona
- (Switzerland) Johan Nikles
- (Argentina) Santiago Rodríguez Taverna

== Champions ==
=== Singles ===
- (Argentina) Sebastián Báez def. (Brazil) Thiago Monteiro 6–1, 6–4.

=== Doubles ===
- (Brazil) Rafael Matos / (Brazil) Felipe Meligeni Alves def. (Brazil) Gilbert Klier Júnior / (Brazil) Matheus Pucinelli de Almeida 6–3, 6–1.
