= 2021 Campeonato Internacional de Tênis de Campinas – Singles =

Singles
- 2021 Campeonato Internacional de Tênis de Campinas

Final
- Champion: (Argentina) Sebastián Báez
- Runner-up: (Brazil) Thiago Monteiro
- Score: 6–1, 6–4

Events
Singles	Doubles
← 2020 ·	Campeonato Internacional de Tênis de Campinas	· 2022 →

Francisco Cerúndolo was the defending champion but lost in the semifinals to Sebastián Báez.

Báez won the title after defeating Thiago Monteiro 6–1, 6–4 in the final.

== Seeds ==
1. (Argentina) Federico Coria (first round)
2. (Spain) Jaume Munar (first round)
3. (Argentina) Juan Manuel Cerúndolo (quarterfinals)
4. (Brazil) Thiago Monteiro (final)
5. (Uruguay) Pablo Cuevas (first round)
6. (Colombia) Daniel Elahi Galán (first round)
7. (Argentina) Sebastián Báez (champion)
8. (Argentina) Francisco Cerúndolo (semifinals)

== Draw ==
=== Key ===
- Q = Qualifier
- WC = Wild card
- LL = Lucky loser
- Alt = Alternate
- SE = Special exempt
- PR = Protected ranking
- ITF = ITF entry
- JE = Junior exempt
- w/o = Walkover
- r = Retired
- d = Defaulted
- SR = Special ranking

=== Finals ===
Semifinals
(Argentina) Tomás Martín Etcheverry	6	2	3
4	(Brazil) Thiago Monteiro	1	6	6
8	(Argentina) Francisco Cerúndolo	6	1	2
7	(Argentina) Sebastián Báez	4	6	6

Final
4	(Brazil) Thiago Monteiro	1	4
7	(Argentina) Sebastián Báez	6	6

=== Top half ===
First round
1	(Argentina) F Coria	2	3
(Chile) N Jarry	6	6
(Argentina) C Ugo Carabelli	7^{7}	3
(Brazil) T Seyboth Wild	6^{4}	1^{r}
(Argentina) TM Etcheverry	6	6
(Dominican Republic) R Cid Subervi	2	0
(Germany) N Kuhn	7	6
6	(Colombia) DE Galán	5	3
4	(Brazil) T Monteiro	6	6
Q	(Switzerland) J Nikles	2	1
(Peru) JP Varillas	6	6
WC	(Brazil) Matheus Bueres	2	1
(Kazakhstan) T Skatov	6	7^{7}
(Argentina) R Olivo	3	6^{3}
(Argentina) A Collarini	6	6
5	(Uruguay) P Cuevas	3	3

Second round
(Chile) N Jarry	6	6
(Argentina) C Ugo Carabelli	1	2
(Argentina) TM Etcheverry	3	6	6
(Germany) N Kuhn	6	4	1
4	(Brazil) T Monteiro	5
(Peru) JP Varillas	1^{r}
(Kazakhstan) T Skatov	7^{7}	6
(Argentina) A Collarini	6^{2}	2

Quarterfinals
(Chile) N Jarry	4	1
(Argentina) TM Etcheverry	6	6
4	(Brazil) T Monteiro	6^{4}	6	7^{7}
(Kazakhstan) T Skatov	7^{7}	3	6^{4}

Semifinals
(Argentina) TM Etcheverry	6	2	3
4	(Brazil) T Monteiro	1	6	6

=== Bottom half ===
First round
8	(Argentina) F Cerúndolo	6	6
WC	(Brazil) Gilbert Klier Júnior	3	0
(Argentina) G Andreozzi	3	4
(Brazil) F Meligeni Alves	6	6
WC	(Brazil) G Heide	7	4	6
(Argentina) JI Londero	5	6	4
Alt	(Brazil) M Pucinelli de Almeida	6	5	1
3	(Argentina) JM Cerúndolo	4	7	6
7	(Argentina) S Báez	7^{7}	6
(Argentina) F Mena	6^{0}	2
Q	(Peru) N Álvarez	4	6	6
(Argentina) P Cachin	6	4	2
Alt	(Brazil) O Luz	3	4
Q	(Spain) N Álvarez Varona	6	6
Q	(Argentina) S Rodríguez Taverna	6	6
2	(Spain) J Munar	4	3

Second round
8	(Argentina) F Cerúndolo	6	6
(Brazil) F Meligeni Alves	2	3
WC	(Brazil) G Heide	1	6	3
3	(Argentina) JM Cerúndolo	6	3	6
7	(Argentina) S Báez	6	6
Q	(Peru) N Álvarez	4	3
Q	(Spain) N Álvarez Varona	6^{7}	7^{7}	5
Q	(Argentina) S Rodríguez Taverna	7^{9}	6^{5}	7

Quarterfinals
8	(Argentina) F Cerúndolo	6	7
3	(Argentina) JM Cerúndolo	1	5
7	(Argentina) S Báez	2	7^{7}	6
Q	(Argentina) S Rodríguez Taverna	6	6^{1}	1

Semifinals
8	(Argentina) F Cerúndolo	6	1	2
7	(Argentina) S Báez	4	6	6
