= 2021 Kyiv Open – Doubles =

Doubles
- 2021 Kyiv Open

Final
- Champions: (Brazil) Orlando Luz (Kazakhstan) Aleksandr Nedovyesov
- Runners-up: (Ukraine) Denys Molchanov (Ukraine) Sergiy Stakhovsky
- Score: 6–4, 6–4

Events
| Singles | Doubles |
- Kyiv Open

This was the first edition of the tournament.

Orlando Luz and Aleksandr Nedovyesov won the title after defeating Denys Molchanov and Sergiy Stakhovsky 6–4, 6–4 in the final.

== Seeds ==
1. (Brazil) Orlando Luz / (Kazakhstan) Aleksandr Nedovyesov (champions)
2. (Ukraine) Denys Molchanov / (Ukraine) Sergiy Stakhovsky (final)
3. (Philippines) Ruben Gonzales / (United States) Hunter Johnson (semifinals)
4. (France) Jonathan Eysseric / (France) Quentin Halys (semifinals)

== Draw ==
Key

- Q = Qualifier
- WC = Wild card
- LL = Lucky loser
- Alt = Alternate
- ITF = ITF entry
- PR = Protected ranking
- SR = Special ranking
- SE = Special exempt
- JE = Junior exempt
- JR = Junior Accelerator Programme entrant
- CO = College Accelerator Programme entrant
- NG = Next Gen Accelerator Program entrant
- w/o = Walkover
- r = Retired
- d = Defaulted

First round
1 | (Brazil) O Luz (Kazakhstan) A Nedovyesov | 7^{9} | 6
WC | (Ukraine) Aleksandr Braynin (Ukraine) G Kravchenko | 6^{7} | 3
(Kazakhstan) T Skatov (Kazakhstan) D Yevseyev | 6 | 6
(Italy) R Bonadio (Italy) F Forti | 1 | 3
3 | (Philippines) R Gonzales (United States) H Johnson | 7^{7} | 6
(United Kingdom) J Clarke (Turkey) E Kırkın | 6^{4} | 4
(Russia) I Gakhov (United States) A Rybakov | 4 | 6 | [10]
WC | (Ukraine) D Kalenichenko (Ukraine) N Mashtakov | 6 | 1 | [5]
(Italy) F Agamenone (Brazil) M Pucinelli de Almeida | 0 | 7^{7} | [10]
(United States) S Kozlov (United States) R Stalder | 6 | 6^{5} | [7]
(Ukraine) O Krutykh (Ukraine) V Manafov | 4 | 4
4 | (France) J Eysseric (France) Q Halys | 6 | 6
Alt | (Russia) Yan Bondarevskiy (Ukraine) O Prihodko | 4 | 6 | [10]
(Kazakhstan) G Lomakin (Kazakhstan) D Popko | 6 | 1 | [2]
WC | (Ukraine) I Beloborodko (Ukraine) V Orlov | 4 | 6^{3}
2 | (Ukraine) D Molchanov (Ukraine) S Stakhovsky | 6 | 7^{7}

Quarterfinals
1 | (Brazil) O Luz (Kazakhstan) A Nedovyesov | 3 | 6 | [11]
(Kazakhstan) T Skatov (Kazakhstan) D Yevseyev | 6 | 2 | [9]
3 | (Philippines) R Gonzales (United States) H Johnson | 6 | 7^{7}
(Russia) I Gakhov (United States) A Rybakov | 2 | 6^{4}
(Italy) F Agamenone (Brazil) M Pucinelli de Almeida | 6 | 3 | [4]
4 | (France) J Eysseric (France) Q Halys | 4 | 6 | [10]
Alt | (Russia) Y Bondarevskiy (Ukraine) O Prihodko | 2 | 4
2 | (Ukraine) D Molchanov (Ukraine) S Stakhovsky | 6 | 6

Semifinals
1 | (Brazil) O Luz (Kazakhstan) A Nedovyesov | 6 | 6
3 | (Philippines) R Gonzales (United States) H Johnson | 4 | 4
4 | (France) J Eysseric (France) Q Halys | 6^{1} | 4
2 | (Ukraine) D Molchanov (Ukraine) S Stakhovsky | 7^{7} | 6

Final
1 | (Brazil) O Luz (Kazakhstan) A Nedovyesov | 6 | 6
2 | (Ukraine) D Molchanov (Ukraine) S Stakhovsky | 4 | 4
