= 2021 Kyiv Open – Singles =

Singles
- 2021 Kyiv Open

Final
- Champion: (Italy) Franco Agamenone
- Runner-up: (Argentina) Sebastián Báez
- Score: 7–5, 6–2

Events
Singles	Doubles
- Kyiv Open

This was the first edition of the tournament.

Franco Agamenone won the title after defeating Sebastián Báez 7–5, 6–2 in the final.

== Seeds ==
1. (Argentina) Sebastián Báez (final)
2. (Portugal) Frederico Ferreira Silva (first round)
3. (France) Quentin Halys (first round)
4. (Kazakhstan) Dmitry Popko (quarterfinals, retired)
5. (United Kingdom) Jay Clarke (first round)
6. (Ukraine) Sergiy Stakhovsky (second round)
7. (France) Constant Lestienne (first round)
8. (France) Tristan Lamasine (second round)

== Draw ==
Key

- Q = Qualifier
- WC = Wild card
- LL = Lucky loser
- Alt = Alternate
- ITF = ITF entry
- PR = Protected ranking
- SR = Special ranking
- SE = Special exempt
- JE = Junior exempt
- JR = Junior Accelerator Programme entrant
- CO = College Accelerator Programme entrant
- NG = Next Gen Accelerator Program entrant
- w/o = Walkover
- r = Retired
- d = Defaulted

=== Finals ===
Semifinals
1	(Argentina) Sebastián Báez	6	6
Alt	(Turkey) Ergi Kırkın	3	2
(Kazakhstan) Timofey Skatov	6^{4}	3
(Italy) Franco Agamenone	7^{7}	6

Final
1	(Argentina) Sebastián Báez	5	2
(Italy) Franco Agamenone	7	6

=== Top half ===
First round
1	(Argentina) S Báez	6	7
WC	(Ukraine) I Beloborodko	3	5
Q	(United States) A Rybakov	5	6	6
(Tunisia) A Dougaz	7	0	3
(Romania) FC Jianu	6	6
WC	(United States) Richard Zusman	4	1
(Italy) R Bonadio	6^{3}	7	6
7	(France) C Lestienne	7^{7}	5	2
4	(Kazakhstan) D Popko	6	0	6
Alt	(Italy) A Bega	4	6	2
Q	(Russia) I Gakhov	1	6	1
(Italy) F Forti	6	3	6
Q	(France) C Tabur	4	6^{5}
Alt	(Turkey) E Kırkın	6	7^{7}
(Netherlands) J Sels	2	3
6	(Ukraine) S Stakhovsky	6	6

Second round
1	(Argentina) S Báez	6	6
Q	(United States) A Rybakov	4	2
(Romania) FC Jianu	7^{7}	3	6
(Italy) R Bonadio	6^{5}	6	4
4	(Kazakhstan) D Popko	7	6
(Italy) F Forti	5	2
Alt	(Turkey) E Kırkın	4	6	6
6	(Ukraine) S Stakhovsky	6	3	2

Quarterfinals
1	(Argentina) S Báez	6	7
(Romania) FC Jianu	3	5
4	(Kazakhstan) D Popko	4	0^{r}
Alt	(Turkey) E Kırkın	6	1

Semifinals
1	(Argentina) S Báez	6	6
Alt	(Turkey) E Kırkın	3	2

=== Bottom half ===
First round
5	(United Kingdom) J Clarke	5	2
(Kazakhstan) T Skatov	7	6
Q	(Ukraine) G Kravchenko	5	7	6
PR	(Belgium) J De Loore	7	5	3
(Brazil) M Pucinelli de Almeida	6	6
(Czech Republic) M Vrbenský	3	2
(Portugal) N Borges	6	7
3	(France) Q Halys	3	5
8	(France) T Lamasine	7^{8}	6
(Japan) K Uchida	6^{6}	2
(Italy) F Agamenone	6	7
(United States) S Kozlov	4	5
(United States) N Chappell	3	6	1
WC	(Ukraine) O Krutykh	6	3	6
(Brazil) O Luz	5	6	7^{7}
2	(Portugal) F Ferreira Silva	7	2	6^{5}

Second round
(Kazakhstan) T Skatov	6	6
Q	(Ukraine) G Kravchenko	2	2
(Brazil) M Pucinelli de Almeida	6	2	5
(Portugal) N Borges	2	6	7
8	(France) T Lamasine	6	2	4
(Italy) F Agamenone	3	6	6
WC	(Ukraine) O Krutykh	6	3	6
(Brazil) O Luz	2	6	3

Quarterfinals
(Kazakhstan) T Skatov	6^{5}	6	6
(Portugal) N Borges	7^{7}	4	4
(Italy) F Agamenone	6	6
WC	(Ukraine) O Krutykh	2	3

Semifinals
(Kazakhstan) T Skatov	6^{4}	3
(Italy) F Agamenone	7^{7}	6
