= 2021 Challenger de Santiago II – Doubles =

Doubles
- 2021 Challenger de Santiago II

Final
- Champions: (Ecuador) Diego Hidalgo (Chile) Nicolás Jarry
- Runners-up: (United States) Evan King (United States) Max Schnur
- Score: 6–3, 5–7, [10–6]

Events
Singles	Doubles
- Challenger de Santiago

Luis David Martínez and Gonçalo Oliveira were the defending champions but lost in the semifinals to Evan King and Max Schnur.

Diego Hidalgo and Nicolás Jarry won the title after defeating King and Schnur 6–3, 5–7, [10–6] in the final.

== Seeds ==
1. (Brazil) Rafael Matos / (Brazil) Felipe Meligeni Alves (semifinals)
2. (Venezuela) Luis David Martínez / (Portugal) Gonçalo Oliveira (semifinals)
3. (Mexico) Hans Hach Verdugo / (Mexico) Miguel Ángel Reyes-Varela (first round)
4. (United States) Evan King / (United States) Max Schnur (final)

== Draw ==
Key

- Q = Qualifier
- WC = Wild card
- LL = Lucky loser
- Alt = Alternate
- ITF = ITF entry
- PR = Protected ranking
- SR = Special ranking
- SE = Special exempt
- JE = Junior exempt
- JR = Junior Accelerator Programme entrant
- CO = College Accelerator Programme entrant
- NG = Next Gen Accelerator Program entrant
- w/o = Walkover
- r = Retired
- d = Defaulted

First round
1	(Brazil) R Matos (Brazil) F Meligeni Alves	6	6
WC	(Chile) Daniel Alejandro Ortiz (Chile) Diego Ortiz Gamonal	2	1
(Argentina) G Andreozzi (Argentina) G Durán	3	6^{1}
(Argentina) S Báez (Brazil) M Pucinelli de Almeida	6	7^{7}
3	(Mexico) H Hach Verdugo (Mexico) MÁ Reyes-Varela	6^{5}	4
(Ecuador) D Hidalgo (Chile) N Jarry	7^{7}	6
PR	(Germany) J Lenz (Austria) G Melzer	4	4
(Colombia) N Barrientos (Brazil) F Romboli	6	6
WC	(Chile) Amador Salazar Yáñez (Chile) Ricardo Urzúa Rivera	1	3
(Peru) S Galdós (Argentina) F Mena	6	6
(Argentina) F Cerúndolo (Argentina) C Ugo Carabelli	0	3
4	(United States) E King (United States) M Schnur	6	6
(Chile) MT Barrios Vera (Spain) C Gómez-Herrera	7^{7}	7^{7}
Alt	(United States) N Chappell (United States) R Stalder	6^{0}	6^{5}
(Argentina) JP Ficovich (Argentina) TA Tirante	6	3	[7]
2	(Venezuela) LD Martínez (Portugal) G Oliveira	3	6	[10]

Quarterfinals
1	(Brazil) R Matos (Brazil) F Meligeni Alves	6	6
(Argentina) S Báez (Brazil) M Pucinelli de Almeida	4	3
(Ecuador) D Hidalgo (Chile) N Jarry	7^{7}	7^{9}
(Colombia) N Barrientos (Brazil) F Romboli	6^{3}	6^{7}
(Peru) S Galdós (Argentina) F Mena	4	6	[8]
4	(United States) E King (United States) M Schnur	6	3	[10]
(Chile) MT Barrios Vera (Spain) C Gómez-Herrera	3	6^{4}
2	(Venezuela) LD Martínez (Portugal) G Oliveira	6	7^{7}

Semifinals
1	(Brazil) R Matos (Brazil) F Meligeni Alves	6	2	[8]
(Ecuador) D Hidalgo (Chile) N Jarry	2	6	[10]
4	(United States) E King (United States) M Schnur	7^{7}	6
2	(Venezuela) LD Martínez (Portugal) G Oliveira	6^{4}	1

Final
(Ecuador) D Hidalgo (Chile) N Jarry	6	5	[10]
4	(United States) E King (United States) M Schnur	3	7	[6]
