= 2021 Challenger de Santiago III =

- Date: 11–17 October
- Edition: 15th
- Surface: Clay
- Location: Santiago, Chile

Champions

Singles
- (Argentina) Sebastián Báez

Doubles
- (United States) Evan King / (United States) Max Schnur
| ← 2021 · | Challenger de Santiago | · 2022 → |

The 2021 Challenger de Santiago III was a professional tennis tournament played on clay courts. It was the 15th edition of the tournament which was part of the 2021 ATP Challenger Tour. It took place in Santiago, Chile between 11 and 17 October 2021.

== Singles main-draw entrants ==
=== Seeds ===
| Country | Player | Rank^{1} | Seed |
|---|---|---|---|
| ARG | Juan Manuel Cerúndolo | 103 | 1 |
| ARG | Francisco Cerúndolo | 110 | 2 |
| PER | Juan Pablo Varillas | 127 | 3 |
| BRA | Thiago Seyboth Wild | 129 | 4 |
| ARG | Sebastián Báez | 140 | 5 |
| CHI | Marcelo Tomás Barrios Vera | 154 | 6 |
| ARG | Juan Ignacio Londero | 157 | 7 |
| FRA | Enzo Couacaud | 189 | 8 |

- ^{1} Rankings are as of 4 October 2021.

=== Other entrants ===
The following players received wildcards into the singles main draw:

- (Chile) Diego Fernández Flores
- (Chile) Matías Soto
- (Chile) Benjamín Torres

The following player received entry into the singles main draw using a protected ranking:

- (Austria) Gerald Melzer

The following players received entry into the singles main draw as alternates:

- (Argentina) Hernán Casanova
- (United States) Nick Chappell
- (Argentina) Facundo Díaz Acosta
- (Chile) Gonzalo Lama

The following players received entry from the qualifying draw:

- (Peru) Nicolás Álvarez
- (United States) Oliver Crawford
- (Ecuador) Diego Hidalgo
- (Brazil) Rafael Matos

The following player received entry as a lucky loser:

- (Monaco) Lucas Catarina

== Champions ==
=== Singles ===
- (Argentina) Sebastián Báez def. (Brazil) Felipe Meligeni Alves 3–6, 7–6^{(8–6)}, 6–1.

=== Doubles ===
- (United States) Evan King / (United States) Max Schnur def. (Mexico) Hans Hach Verdugo / (Mexico) Miguel Ángel Reyes-Varela 3–6, 7–6^{(7–3)}, [16–14].
