= 2018 Campeonato Internacional de Tênis de Campinas =

Professional tennis tournament

- Date: 1–7 October
- Edition: 7th
- Draw: 32S / 16D
- Surface: Clay
- Location: Campinas, Brazil

Champions

Singles
- (Chile) Cristian Garín

Doubles
- (Bolivia) Hugo Dellien / (Argentina) Guillermo Durán
← 2016 ·	Campeonato Internacional de Tênis de Campinas	· 2019 →

The 2018 Campeonato Internacional de Tênis de Campinas was a professional tennis tournament played on clay courts. It was the seventh edition of the tournament which was part of the 2018 ATP Challenger Tour. It took place in Campinas, Brazil between 1 and 7 October 2018.

== Singles main-draw entrants ==
=== Seeds ===
Country	Player	Rank^{1}	Seed
URU	Pablo Cuevas	66	1
ARG	Federico Delbonis	91	2
BOL	Hugo Dellien	105	3
BRA	Thiago Monteiro	111	4
ARG	Juan Ignacio Londero	118	5
ARG	Facundo Bagnis	140	6
ARG	Carlos Berlocq	142	7
CHI	Christian Garín	143	8

- ^{1} Rankings as of 24 September 2018.

=== Other entrants ===
The following players received wildcards into the singles main draw:

- (Brazil) Rafael Matos
- (Brazil) Felipe Meligeni Alves
- (Brazil) Matheus Pucinelli de Almeida
- (Brazil) Thiago Seyboth Wild

The following players received entry from the qualifying draw:

- (Peru) Nicolás Álvarez
- (Ecuador) Emilio Gómez
- (Brazil) João Souza
- (Argentina) Camilo Ugo Carabelli

== Champions ==
=== Singles ===
- (Chile) Christian Garín def. (Argentina) Federico Delbonis 6–3, 6–4.

=== Doubles ===
- (Bolivia) Hugo Dellien / (Argentina) Guillermo Durán def. (Argentina) Franco Agamenone / (Brazil) Fernando Romboli 7–5, 6–4.
