= 2022 Campeonato Internacional de Tênis de Campinas – Doubles =

Doubles
- 2022 Campeonato Internacional de Tênis de Campinas

Final
- Champions: (Bolivia) Boris Arias (Bolivia) Federico Zeballos
- Runners-up: (Argentina) Guido Andreozzi (Argentina) Guillermo Durán
- Score: 7–5, 6–2

Events
Singles	Doubles
← 2021 ·	Campeonato Internacional de Tênis de Campinas	· 2023 →

Rafael Matos and Felipe Meligeni Alves were the defending champions but only Meligeni Alves chose to defend his title, partnering Matheus Pucinelli de Almeida. Meligeni Alves withdrew before his first round match due to injury.

Boris Arias and Federico Zeballos won the title after defeating Guido Andreozzi and Guillermo Durán 7–5, 6–2 in the final.

== Seeds ==
1. (Italy) Luciano Darderi / (Argentina) Facundo Mena (first round)
2. (Bolivia) Boris Arias / (Bolivia) Federico Zeballos (champions)
3. (Argentina) Guido Andreozzi / (Argentina) Guillermo Durán (final)
4. (Brazil) Felipe Meligeni Alves / (Brazil) Matheus Pucinelli de Almeida (withdrew)

== Draw ==
=== Key ===
- Q = Qualifier
- WC = Wild card
- LL = Lucky loser
- Alt = Alternate
- SE = Special exempt
- PR = Protected ranking
- ITF = ITF entry
- JE = Junior exempt
- w/o = Walkover
- r = Retired
- d = Defaulted
- SR = Special ranking

First round
1	(Italy) L Darderi (Argentina) F Mena	6	3	[8]
(Argentina) JP Paz (Brazil) J Pereira	4	6	[10]
WC	(Brazil) JL Reis da Silva (Brazil) T Seyboth Wild	6	7^{8}
(Argentina) Facundo Juárez (Argentina) G Villanueva	1	6^{6}
3	(Argentina) G Andreozzi (Argentina) G Durán	6	6
PR	(United Kingdom) J Choinski (Switzerland) Mirko Martinez	2	4
(Poland) P Matuszewski (Peru) A Merino	3	6	[10]
Alt	(Argentina) GA Olivieri (Argentina) S Rodríguez Taverna	6	4	[7]
(Brazil) O Luz (Brazil) M Zormann	7^{7}	6
(Kazakhstan) D Popko (Spain) D Rincón	6^{3}	3
WC	(Brazil) E Ribeiro (Brazil) Gabriel Roveri Sidney	6	6
Alt	(Brazil) Enrique Bogo (Brazil) Matheus Bueres	4	1
(Poland) K Drzewiecki (Switzerland) J Paul	6	7
Alt	(Switzerland) R Bertola (Argentina) JB Torres	1	5
(France) A Müller (India) S Nagal	6	2	[5]
2	(Bolivia) B Arias (Bolivia) F Zeballos	4	6	[10]

Quarterfinals
(Argentina) JP Paz (Brazil) J Pereira	6	6
WC	(Brazil) JL Reis da Silva (Brazil) T Seyboth Wild	2	4
3	(Argentina) G Andreozzi (Argentina) G Durán	6	6
(Poland) P Matuszewski (Peru) A Merino	3	3
(Brazil) O Luz (Brazil) M Zormann	6	6
WC	(Brazil) E Ribeiro (Brazil) G Roveri Sidney	2	0
(Poland) K Drzewiecki (Switzerland) J Paul	7^{7}	3	[9]
2	(Bolivia) B Arias (Bolivia) F Zeballos	6^{5}	6	[11]

Semifinals
(Argentina) JP Paz (Brazil) J Pereira	3	6^{3}
3	(Argentina) G Andreozzi (Argentina) G Durán	6	7^{7}
(Brazil) O Luz (Brazil) M Zormann	4	3
2	(Bolivia) B Arias (Bolivia) F Zeballos	6	6

Final
3	(Argentina) G Andreozzi (Argentina) G Durán	5	2
2	(Bolivia) B Arias (Bolivia) F Zeballos	7	6
