= 2021 Challenger de Santiago III – Singles =

Singles
- 2021 Challenger de Santiago III

Final
- Champion: (Argentina) Sebastián Báez
- Runner-up: (Brazil) Felipe Meligeni Alves
- Score: 3–6, 7–6^{(8–6)}, 6–1

Events
Singles	Doubles
- Challenger de Santiago

Juan Pablo Varillas was the defending champion but lost in the quarterfinals to Marcelo Tomás Barrios Vera.

Sebastián Báez won the title after defeating Felipe Meligeni Alves 3–6, 7–6^{(8–6)}, 6–1 in the final.

== Seeds ==
1. (Argentina) Juan Manuel Cerúndolo (quarterfinals)
2. (Argentina) Francisco Cerúndolo (quarterfinals)
3. (Peru) Juan Pablo Varillas (quarterfinals)
4. (Brazil) Thiago Seyboth Wild (first round)
5. (Argentina) Sebastián Báez (champion)
6. (Chile) Marcelo Tomás Barrios Vera (semifinals)
7. (Argentina) Juan Ignacio Londero (second round)
8. (France) Enzo Couacaud (first round)

== Draw ==
Key

- Q = Qualifier
- WC = Wild card
- LL = Lucky loser
- Alt = Alternate
- ITF = ITF entry
- PR = Protected ranking
- SR = Special ranking
- SE = Special exempt
- JE = Junior exempt
- JR = Junior Accelerator Programme entrant
- CO = College Accelerator Programme entrant
- NG = Next Gen Accelerator Program entrant
- w/o = Walkover
- r = Retired
- d = Defaulted

=== Finals ===
Semifinals
5	(Argentina) Sebastián Báez	3	6	6
6	(Chile) Marcelo Tomás Barrios Vera	6	3	4
(Brazil) Felipe Meligeni Alves	6	6
(Brazil) Matheus Pucinelli de Almeida	2	4

Final
5	(Argentina) Sebastián Báez	3	7^{8}	6
(Brazil) Felipe Meligeni Alves	6	6^{6}	1

=== Top half ===
First round
1	(Argentina) JM Cerúndolo	6	6
(Germany) J Lenz	3	3
WC	(Chile) Benjamín Torres	3	4
(Argentina) P Cachin	6	6
(Argentina) JP Ficovich	6	6
(Portugal) G Oliveira	3	1
Q	(Peru) N Álvarez	5	3
5	(Argentina) S Báez	7	6
3	(Peru) JP Varillas	6	6
(Argentina) F Mena	4	2
(Czech Republic) D Svrčina	6	6
Q	(Ecuador) D Hidalgo	2	0
Q	(Brazil) R Matos	2	6	4
WC	(Chile) D Fernández Flores	6	4	6
LL	(Monaco) L Catarina	5	2
6	(Chile) MT Barrios Vera	7	6

Second round
1	(Argentina) JM Cerúndolo	6	3	6
(Argentina) P Cachin	4	6	2
(Argentina) JP Ficovich	1	5
5	(Argentina) S Báez	6	7
3	(Peru) JP Varillas	6	1	6
(Czech Republic) D Svrčina	4	6	4
WC	(Chile) D Fernández Flores	0	1
6	(Chile) MT Barrios Vera	6	6

Quarterfinals
1	(Argentina) JM Cerúndolo	3	4
5	(Argentina) S Báez	6	6
3	(Peru) JP Varillas	3	4
6	(Chile) MT Barrios Vera	6	6

Semifinals
5	(Argentina) S Báez	3	6	6
6	(Chile) MT Barrios Vera	6	3	4

=== Bottom half ===
First round
7	(Argentina) JI Londero	6	3	6
Alt	(Chile) G Lama	2	6	1
Q	(United States) O Crawford	6^{6}	3
(Brazil) F Meligeni Alves	7^{8}	6
(Chile) N Jarry	6^{2}	4
PR	(Austria) G Melzer	7^{7}	6
(Argentina) TA Tirante	6	4	6
4	(Brazil) T Seyboth Wild	4	6	2
8	(France) E Couacaud	1	1
(Brazil) M Pucinelli de Almeida	6	6
(Argentina) N Kicker	6	6
WC	(Chile) M Soto	3	0
Alt	(United States) N Chappell	3	4
Alt	(Argentina) H Casanova	6	6
Alt	(Argentina) F Díaz Acosta	4	0
2	(Argentina) F Cerúndolo	6	6

Second round
7	(Argentina) JI Londero	6	3	4
(Brazil) F Meligeni Alves	2	6	6
PR	(Austria) G Melzer	6	6
(Argentina) TA Tirante	2	0
(Brazil) M Pucinelli de Almeida	3	6	6
(Argentina) N Kicker	6	2	4
Alt	(Argentina) H Casanova	2	5
2	(Argentina) F Cerúndolo	6	7

Quarterfinals
(Brazil) F Meligeni Alves	6	5	7
PR	(Austria) G Melzer	3	7	5
(Brazil) M Pucinelli de Almeida	7^{7}	2	6
2	(Argentina) F Cerúndolo	6^{3}	6	4

Semifinals
(Brazil) F Meligeni Alves	6	6
(Brazil) M Pucinelli de Almeida	2	4
