= 2021 Kyiv Open =

- Date: 6–12 September
- Edition: 1st
- Surface: Clay
- Location: Kyiv, Ukraine

Champions

Singles
- (Italy) Franco Agamenone

Doubles
- (Brazil) Orlando Luz / (Kazakhstan) Aleksandr Nedovyesov
- Kyiv Open

The 2021 Kyiv Open was a professional tennis tournament played on clay courts. It was the first edition of the tournament which was part of the 2021 ATP Challenger Tour. It took place in Kyiv, Ukraine between 6 and 12 September 2021.

== Singles main-draw entrants ==
=== Seeds ===
Country	Player	Rank^{1}	Seed
ARG	Sebastián Báez	155	1
POR	Frederico Ferreira Silva	180	2
FRA	Quentin Halys	183	3
KAZ	Dmitry Popko	193	4
GBR	Jay Clarke	206	5
UKR	Sergiy Stakhovsky	227	6
FRA	Constant Lestienne	248	7
FRA	Tristan Lamasine	260	8

- ^{1} Rankings are as of 30 August 2021.

=== Other entrants ===
The following players received wildcards into the singles main draw:

- (Ukraine) Illya Beloborodko
- (Ukraine) Oleksii Krutykh
- (United States) Richard Zusman

The following player received entry into the singles main draw using a protected ranking:

- (Belgium) Joris De Loore

The following players received entry into the singles main draw as alternates:

- (Italy) Alessandro Bega
- (Turkey) Ergi Kırkın

The following players received entry from the qualifying draw:

- (Russia) Ivan Gakhov
- (Ukraine) Georgii Kravchenko
- (United States) Alex Rybakov
- (France) Clément Tabur

== Champions ==
=== Singles ===
- (Italy) Franco Agamenone def. (Argentina) Sebastián Báez 7–5, 6–2.

=== Doubles ===
- (Brazil) Orlando Luz / (Kazakhstan) Aleksandr Nedovyesov def. (Ukraine) Denys Molchanov / (Ukraine) Sergiy Stakhovsky 6–4, 6–4.
