= 2020 Campeonato Internacional de Tênis de Campinas – Doubles =

Doubles
- 2020 Campeonato Internacional de Tênis de Campinas

Final
- Champions: (France) Sadio Doumbia (France) Fabien Reboul
- Runners-up: (Venezuela) Luis David Martínez (Brazil) Felipe Meligeni Alves
- Score: 6–7^{(7–9)}, 7–5, [10–7]

Events
Singles	Doubles
← 2019 ·	Campeonato Internacional de Tênis de Campinas	· 2021 →

Orlando Luz and Rafael Matos were the defending champions but only Matos chose to defend his title, partnering João Menezes. Matos withdrew from the tournament before his quarterfinal match.

Sadio Doumbia and Fabien Reboul won the title after defeating Luis David Martínez and Felipe Meligeni Alves 6–7^{(7–9)}, 7–5, [10–7] in the final.

== Seeds ==
1. (Venezuela) Luis David Martínez / (Brazil) Felipe Meligeni Alves (final)
2. (France) Sadio Doumbia / (France) Fabien Reboul (champions)
3. (United States) Martin Redlicki / (United States) Hunter Reese (semifinals)
4. (Uruguay) Martín Cuevas / (Argentina) Guillermo Durán (semifinals)

== Draw ==
=== Key ===
- Q = Qualifier
- WC = Wild card
- LL = Lucky loser
- Alt = Alternate
- SE = Special exempt
- PR = Protected ranking
- ITF = ITF entry
- JE = Junior exempt
- w/o = Walkover
- r = Retired
- d = Defaulted
- SR = Special ranking

First round
1	(Venezuela) LD Martínez (Brazil) F Meligeni Alves	6	6
WC	(Brazil) Oscar José Gutierrez (Brazil) E Ribeiro	3	3
(Russia) T Gabashvili (Peru) A Merino	4	3
(Chile) MT Barrios Vera (Chile) A Tabilo	6	6
3	(United States) Ma Redlicki (United States) H Reese	6^{8}	6	[11]
(Ecuador) D Hidalgo (Zimbabwe) B Lock	7^{10}	4	[9]
WC	(Brazil) M Pucinelli de Almeida (Brazil) JL Reis da Silva	3	7	[10]
(Ecuador) E Gómez (Spain) C Gómez-Herrera	6	5	[5]
(Brazil) R Matos (Brazil) J Menezes	7^{12}	7^{7}
(Peru) S Galdós (Argentina) F Mena	6^{10}	6^{5}
WC	(Brazil) Matheus Bueres (Brazil) Enzo Camargo Lima	3	2
4	(Uruguay) M Cuevas (Argentina) G Durán	6	6
(Egypt) M Safwat (Netherlands) M Vervoort	3	3
Alt	(Peru) N Álvarez (Tunisia) A Dougaz	6	6
(Brazil) R Dutra Silva (Brazil) F Romboli	6	3	[13]
2	(France) S Doumbia (France) F Reboul	4	6	[15]

Quarterfinals
1	(Venezuela) LD Martínez (Brazil) F Meligeni Alves	6	6
(Chile) MT Barrios Vera (Chile) A Tabilo	4	3
3	(United States) Ma Redlicki (United States) H Reese	6	6^{4}	[12]
WC	(Brazil) M Pucinelli de Almeida (Brazil) JL Reis da Silva	1	7^{7}	[10]
(Brazil) R Matos (Brazil) J Menezes
4	(Uruguay) M Cuevas (Argentina) G Durán	w/o
Alt	(Peru) N Álvarez (Tunisia) A Dougaz	2	5
2	(France) S Doumbia (France) F Reboul	6	7

Semifinals
1	(Venezuela) LD Martínez (Brazil) F Meligeni Alves	7	6
3	(United States) Ma Redlicki (United States) H Reese	5	4
4	(Uruguay) M Cuevas (Argentina) G Durán	3	2
2	(France) S Doumbia (France) F Reboul	6	6

Final
1	(Venezuela) LD Martínez (Brazil) F Meligeni Alves	7^{9}	5	[7]
2	(France) S Doumbia (France) F Reboul	6^{7}	7	[10]
