= 2022 Campeonato Internacional de Tênis de Campinas – Singles =

Singles
- 2022 Campeonato Internacional de Tênis de Campinas

Final
- Champion: (United Kingdom) Jan Choinski
- Runner-up: (Peru) Juan Pablo Varillas
- Score: 6–4, 6–4

Events
Singles	Doubles
- Campeonato Internacional de Tênis de Campinas

Sebastián Báez was the defending champion but chose not to defend his title.

Jan Choinski won the title after defeating Juan Pablo Varillas 6–4, 6–4 in the final.

== Seeds ==
1. (Germany) Daniel Altmaier (first round)
2. (Peru) Juan Pablo Varillas (final)
3. (Argentina) Facundo Bagnis (quarterfinals)
4. (Argentina) Camilo Ugo Carabelli (withdrew)
5. (Argentina) Juan Pablo Ficovich (first round)
6. (Brazil) Felipe Meligeni Alves (first round, retired)
7. (France) Alexandre Müller (quarterfinals)
8. (Argentina) Facundo Mena (quarterfinals)

== Draw ==
Key

- Q = Qualifier
- WC = Wild card
- LL = Lucky loser
- Alt = Alternate
- ITF = ITF entry
- PR = Protected ranking
- SR = Special ranking
- SE = Special exempt
- JE = Junior exempt
- JR = Junior Accelerator Programme entrant
- CO = College Accelerator Programme entrant
- NG = Next Gen Accelerator Program entrant
- w/o = Walkover
- r = Retired
- d = Defaulted

=== Finals ===
Semifinals
LL	(Switzerland) Rémy Bertola	4	4
Q	(United Kingdom) Jan Choinski	6	6
(Italy) Luciano Darderi	3	4
2	(Peru) Juan Pablo Varillas	6	6

Final
Q	(United Kingdom) Jan Choinski	6	6
2	(Peru) Juan Pablo Varillas	4	4

=== Top half ===
First round
1	(Germany) D Altmaier	3	5
LL	(Switzerland) R Bertola	6	7
(Brazil) D Dutra da Silva	5	6	6
Alt	(Spain) P Martín Tiffon	7	1	3
Q	(Argentina) G Villanueva	0	6	6
Q	(Brazil) J Pereira	6	4	3
PR	(India) S Nagal	6	4	2
8	(Argentina) F Mena	3	6	6
Q	(United Kingdom) J Choinski	6	6
(Chile) G Lama	3	1
Alt	(Argentina) JB Torres	6	6
Alt	(Argentina) N Kicker	2	2
(Germany) Y Hanfmann	6	6^{2}	6^{2}
(Italy) A Giannessi	4	7^{7}	7^{7}
Q	(Argentina) JP Paz	6^{9}	6	2
7	(France) A Müller	7^{11}	4	6

Second round
LL	(Switzerland) R Bertola	7	6
(Brazil) D Dutra da Silva	5	2
Q	(Argentina) G Villanueva	4	7	2
8	(Argentina) F Mena	6	5	6
Q	(United Kingdom) J Choinski	6	6
Alt	(Argentina) JB Torres	2	1
(Italy) A Giannessi	7	0	2
7	(France) A Müller	5	6	6

Quarterfinals
LL	(Switzerland) R Bertola	6	3	6
8	(Argentina) F Mena	3	6	3
Q	(United Kingdom) J Choinski	6	1	6
7	(France) A Müller	0	6	4

Semifinals
LL	(Switzerland) R Bertola	4	4
Q	(United Kingdom) J Choinski	6	6

=== Bottom half ===
First round
6	(Brazil) F Meligeni Alves	6	6^{6}	1^{r}
(Italy) L Darderi	1	7^{8}	5
Q	(Spain) D Rincón	2	6^{3}
(Brazil) M Pucinelli de Almeida	6	7^{7}
WC	(Brazil) E Ribeiro	6	6
WC	(Brazil) T Seyboth Wild	3	4
(Kazakhstan) D Popko	6^{3}	1
3	(Argentina) F Bagnis	7^{7}	6
5	(Argentina) JP Ficovich	4	0
(Argentina) S Rodríguez Taverna	6	6
Q	(Argentina) Facundo Juárez	4	6	7^{7}
Alt	(Argentina) GA Olivieri	6	3	6^{4}
LL	(Brazil) Wilson Leite	6	6
WC	(Brazil) Matheus Bueres	3	4
(Portugal) G Elias	6^{2}	4
2	(Peru) JP Varillas	7^{7}	6

Second round
(Italy) L Darderi	6	6^{7}	6
(Brazil) M Pucinelli de Almeida	3	7^{9}	3
WC	(Brazil) E Ribeiro	3	3
3	(Argentina) F Bagnis	6	6
(Argentina) S Rodríguez Taverna	6	4	1
Q	(Argentina) F Juárez	4	6	6
LL	(Brazil) W Leite	1	3
2	(Peru) JP Varillas	6	6

Quarterfinals
(Italy) L Darderi	0	7	6
3	(Argentina) F Bagnis	6	5	2
Q	(Argentina) F Juárez	3	2
2	(Peru) JP Varillas	6	6

Semifinals
(Italy) L Darderi	3	4
2	(Peru) JP Varillas	6	6
