= 2021 Challenger de Santiago – Singles =

Singles
- 2021 Challenger de Santiago

Final
- Champion: (Argentina) Sebastián Báez
- Runner-up: (Chile) Marcelo Tomás Barrios Vera
- Score: 6–3, 7–6^{(7–4)}

Events
Singles	Doubles
- Challenger de Santiago

Hugo Dellien was the defending champion but chose not to defend his title.

Sebastián Báez won the title after defeating Marcelo Tomás Barrios Vera 6–3, 7–6^{(7–4)} in the final.

== Seeds ==
1. (Spain) Roberto Carballés Baena (second round)
2. (Slovakia) Andrej Martin (second round)
3. (Portugal) Pedro Sousa (second round)
4. (Argentina) Facundo Bagnis (withdrew)
5. (Slovakia) Jozef Kovalík (first round)
6. (Germany) Daniel Altmaier (second round)
7. (Belgium) Kimmer Coppejans (second round)
8. (Chile) Alejandro Tabilo (first round)

== Draw ==
Key

- Q = Qualifier
- WC = Wild card
- LL = Lucky loser
- Alt = Alternate
- ITF = ITF entry
- PR = Protected ranking
- SR = Special ranking
- SE = Special exempt
- JE = Junior exempt
- JR = Junior Accelerator Programme entrant
- CO = College Accelerator Programme entrant
- NG = Next Gen Accelerator Program entrant
- w/o = Walkover
- r = Retired
- d = Defaulted

=== Finals ===
Semifinals
(Chile) Marcelo Tomás Barrios Vera	7^{7}	1
(Brazil) Felipe Meligeni Alves	6^{5}	1^{r}
(Argentina) Sebastián Báez	6	7^{7}
(Peru) Juan Pablo Varillas	1	6^{3}

Final
(Chile) Marcelo Tomás Barrios Vera	3	6^{4}
(Argentina) Sebastián Báez	6	7^{7}

=== Top half ===
First round
1	(Spain) R Carballés Baena	2	6	7^{7}
(Brazil) T Bellucci	6	2	6^{0}
WC	(Chile) G Lama	6	6
(Argentina) TM Etcheverry	4	2
(Chile) MT Barrios Vera	4	6	7^{7}
(Sweden) C Lindell	6	1	6^{4}
(Brazil) O Luz	3	1
7	(Belgium) K Coppejans	6	6
3	(Portugal) P Sousa	6	6
LL	(Brazil) R Matos	4	3
(Brazil) F Meligeni Alves	5	6	7
Q	(Brazil) J Menezes	7	3	5
(Morocco) E Benchetrit	6	6
(France) G Blancaneaux	4	4
Q	(Argentina) N Kicker	6	6
5	(Slovakia) J Kovalík	2	3

Second round
1	(Spain) R Carballés Baena	6	6^{5}	6^{8}
WC	(Chile) G Lama	2	7^{7}	7^{10}
(Chile) MT Barrios Vera	6	6
7	(Belgium) K Coppejans	4	4
3	(Portugal) P Sousa	4	2
(Brazil) F Meligeni Alves	6	6
(Morocco) E Benchetrit	2	4
Q	(Argentina) N Kicker	6	6

Quarterfinals
WC	(Chile) G Lama	6^{4}	6^{5}
(Chile) MT Barrios Vera	7^{7}	7^{7}
(Brazil) F Meligeni Alves	6	7
Q	(Argentina) N Kicker	1	5

Semifinals
(Chile) MT Barrios Vera	7^{7}	1
(Brazil) F Meligeni Alves	6^{5}	1^{r}

=== Bottom half ===
First round
6	(Germany) D Altmaier	6	6
(Argentina) G Andreozzi	4	3
Alt	(Argentina) C Ugo Carabelli	6	6
Q	(Uruguay) M Cuevas	4	0
WC	(Denmark) H Rune	2	4
(Argentina) S Báez	6	6
(Argentina) A Collarini	4	4
Q	(Argentina) G Villanueva	6	6
8	(Chile) A Tabilo	3	2
WC	(Chile) N Jarry	6	6
(Peru) N Álvarez	3	6	6
(Brazil) P Sakamoto	6	4	3
(Peru) JP Varillas	6	3	7
(Argentina) R Olivo	4	6	5
(Portugal) G Oliveira	6^{2}	5
2	(Slovakia) A Martin	7^{7}	7

Second round
6	(Germany) D Altmaier	4	6	3
Alt	(Argentina) C Ugo Carabelli	6	3	6
(Argentina) S Báez	7	6
Q	(Argentina) G Villanueva	5	2
WC	(Chile) N Jarry	6	6
(Peru) N Álvarez	3	4
(Peru) JP Varillas	6	6^{9}	6
2	(Slovakia) A Martin	4	7^{11}	4

Quarterfinals
Alt	(Argentina) C Ugo Carabelli	2	1
(Argentina) S Báez	6	6
WC	(Chile) N Jarry	2	4
(Peru) JP Varillas	6	6

Semifinals
(Argentina) S Báez	6	7^{7}
(Peru) JP Varillas	1	6^{3}
