= 2019 Campeonato Internacional de Tênis de Campinas – Singles =

Singles
- 2019 Campeonato Internacional de Tênis de Campinas

Final
- Champion: (Peru) Juan Pablo Varillas
- Runner-up: (Argentina) Juan Pablo Ficovich
- Score: 2–6, 7–6^{(7–4)}, 6–2

Events
Singles	Doubles
← 2018 ·	Campeonato Internacional de Tênis de Campinas	· 2020 →

Cristian Garín was the defending champion but chose not to defend his title.

Juan Pablo Varillas won the title after defeating Juan Pablo Ficovich 2–6, 7–6^{(7–4)}, 6–2 in the final.

== Seeds ==
All seeds receive a bye into the second round.

1. (Bolivia) Hugo Dellien (third round)
2. (Argentina) Leonardo Mayer (third round, withdrew)
3. (Brazil) Thiago Monteiro (second round)
4. (Argentina) Guido Andreozzi (second round, retired)
5. (Argentina) Federico Coria (semifinals)
6. (India) Sumit Nagal (semifinals)
7. (Argentina) Facundo Bagnis (second round)
8. (Argentina) Facundo Mena (second round)
9. (Brazil) João Menezes (second round)
10. (Argentina) Andrea Collarini (third round)
11. (Chile) Alejandro Tabilo (third round)
12. (Dominican Republic) José Hernández-Fernández (second round)
13. (Argentina) Francisco Cerúndolo (quarterfinals)
14. (Argentina) Renzo Olivo (second round)
15. (Germany) Jeremy Jahn (second round)
16. (Brazil) Thomaz Bellucci (quarterfinals)

== Draw ==
=== Key ===
- Q = Qualifier
- WC = Wild card
- LL = Lucky loser
- Alt = Alternate
- SE = Special exempt
- PR = Protected ranking
- ITF = ITF entry
- JE = Junior exempt
- w/o = Walkover
- r = Retired
- d = Defaulted
- SR = Special ranking

=== Finals ===
Quarterfinals
13	(Argentina) Francisco Cerúndolo	6^{2}	5
6	(India) Sumit Nagal	7^{7}	7
(Peru) Nicolás Álvarez	1	3
(Argentina) Juan Pablo Ficovich	6	6
(Peru) Juan Pablo Varillas	6	6
(Ecuador) Diego Hidalgo	1	2
5	(Argentina) Federico Coria	6	7^{7}
16	(Brazil) Thomaz Bellucci	4	6^{1}

Semifinals
6	(India) Sumit Nagal	4	1
(Argentina) Juan Pablo Ficovich	6	6
(Peru) Juan Pablo Varillas	6	6
5	(Argentina) Federico Coria	0	4

Final
(Argentina) Juan Pablo Ficovich	6	6^{4}	2
(Peru) Juan Pablo Varillas	2	7^{7}	6

=== Top half ===
==== Section 1 ====
First round
(Brazil) Jordan Correia	1	0
(Brazil) G Clezar	6	6
(Chile) Bastián Malla	5	7	1^{r}
WC	(Brazil) R Matos	7	5	3
(Brazil) O Luz	6	7
WC	(Brazil) P Boscardin Dias	0	5
(Portugal) G Elias	7	6
(Uruguay) M Cuevas	5	2

Second round
1	(Bolivia) H Dellien	6	6
(Brazil) G Clezar	3	4
WC	(Brazil) R Matos	2	3
13	(Argentina) F Cerúndolo	6	6
9	(Brazil) J Menezes	4	4
(Brazil) O Luz	6	6
(Portugal) G Elias	1^{r}
6	(India) S Nagal	4

Third round
1	(Bolivia) H Dellien	4	1
13	(Argentina) F Cerúndolo	6	6
(Brazil) O Luz	5	3
6	(India) S Nagal	7	6

Quarterfinals
13	(Argentina) F Cerúndolo	6^{2}	5
6	(India) S Nagal	7^{7}	7

==== Section 2 ====
First round
(Brazil) P Sakamoto	6	6
(Spain) P Toledo Bagué	4	0
WC	(Brazil) Gilbert Klier Júnior	2	3
(Peru) N Álvarez	6	6
(Colombia) A González	7	7
WC	(Brazil) JL Reis da Silva	5	5
(Argentina) Matías Zukas	2	3
(Argentina) JP Ficovich	6	6

Second round
4	(Argentina) G Andreozzi	4	0^{r}
(Brazil) P Sakamoto	6	4
(Peru) N Álvarez	6	6
15	(Germany) Jeremy Jahn	4	2
12	(Dominican Republic) J Hernández-Fernández	6^{4}	7^{9}	3
(Colombia) A González	7^{7}	6^{7}	6
(Argentina) JP Ficovich	6	6
8	(Argentina) F Mena	4	1

Third round
(Brazil) P Sakamoto	1	2
(Peru) N Álvarez	6	6
(Colombia) A González	3	3
(Argentina) JP Ficovich	6	6

Quarterfinals
(Peru) N Álvarez	1	3
(Argentina) JP Ficovich	6	6

=== Bottom half ===
==== Section 3 ====
First round
(Brazil) Oscar José Gutierrez	2	2
(Peru) JP Varillas	6	6
WC	(Brazil) M Pucinelli de Almeida	3	4
(Argentina) TM Etcheverry	6	6
(Ecuador) D Hidalgo	6	4
Q	(Brazil) D Dutra da Silva	4	0^{r}
(France) M Hamou	6	6
(Colombia) N Mejía	3	3

Second round
7	(Argentina) F Bagnis	2	4
(Peru) JP Varillas	6	6
(Argentina) TM Etcheverry	4	4
10	(Argentina) A Collarini	6	6
14	(Argentina) R Olivo	6^{2}	2
(Ecuador) D Hidalgo	7^{7}	6
(France) M Hamou	7	4	6
3	(Brazil) T Monteiro	5	6	1

Third round
(Peru) JP Varillas	7^{7}	6
10	(Argentina) A Collarini	6^{5}	2
(Ecuador) D Hidalgo	7^{7}	4	6
(France) M Hamou	6^{5}	6	3

Quarterfinals
(Peru) JP Varillas	6	6
(Ecuador) D Hidalgo	1	2

==== Section 4 ====
First round
(Brazil) F Meligeni Alves	5	6	6
(Brazil) T Seyboth Wild	7	2	2
(Argentina) G Villanueva	6	6
Q	(Brazil) F Romboli	2	2
(Argentina) GA Olivieri	6^{4}	5
(Sweden) C Lindell	7^{7}	7
(Argentina) C Ugo Carabelli	6	6
(Argentina) A Velotti	4	3

Second round
5	(Argentina) F Coria	6	7^{8}
(Brazil) F Meligeni Alves	2	6^{6}
(Argentina) G Villanueva	0	3
11	(Chile) A Tabilo	6	6
16	(Brazil) T Bellucci	7^{7}	0
(Sweden) C Lindell	6^{4}	0^{d}
(Argentina) C Ugo Carabelli	6^{1}	4
2	(Argentina) L Mayer	7^{7}	6

Third round
5	(Argentina) F Coria	6	4	6
11	(Chile) A Tabilo	3	6	4
16	(Brazil) T Bellucci	w/o
2	(Argentina) L Mayer

Quarterfinals
5	(Argentina) F Coria	6	7^{7}
16	(Brazil) T Bellucci	4	6^{1}
