= 2021 Campeonato Internacional de Tênis de Campinas – Doubles =

Doubles
- 2021 Campeonato Internacional de Tênis de Campinas

Final
- Champions: (Brazil) Rafael Matos (Brazil) Felipe Meligeni Alves
- Runners-up: (Brazil) Gilbert Klier Júnior (Brazil) Matheus Pucinelli de Almeida
- Score: 6–3, 6–1

Events
Singles	Doubles
← 2020 ·	Campeonato Internacional de Tênis de Campinas	· 2022 →

Sadio Doumbia and Fabien Reboul were the defending champions but chose not to defend their title.

Rafael Matos and Felipe Meligeni Alves won the title after defeating Gilbert Klier Júnior and Matheus Pucinelli de Almeida 6–3, 6–1 in the final.

== Seeds ==
1. (Brazil) Rafael Matos / (Brazil) Felipe Meligeni Alves (champions)
2. (Brazil) Orlando Luz / (Venezuela) Luis David Martínez (first round)
3. (Netherlands) Mark Vervoort / (Bolivia) Federico Zeballos (quarterfinals)
4. (Argentina) Pedro Cachin / (Argentina) Facundo Mena (first round)

== Draw ==
=== Key ===
- Q = Qualifier
- WC = Wild card
- LL = Lucky loser
- Alt = Alternate
- SE = Special exempt
- PR = Protected ranking
- ITF = ITF entry
- JE = Junior exempt
- w/o = Walkover
- r = Retired
- d = Defaulted
- SR = Special ranking

First round
1	(Brazil) R Matos (Brazil) F Meligeni Alves	6	6
WC	(Brazil) JL Reis da Silva (Brazil) E Ribeiro	1	2
WC	(Brazil) M Alves (Brazil) Oscar José Gutierrez	6	6
WC	(Brazil) Iago Almeida (Brazil) Enzo Camargo Lima	2	1
3	(Netherlands) M Vervoort (Bolivia) F Zeballos	w/o
(Argentina) A Collarini (Germany) N Kuhn
(Brazil) F Romboli (Brazil) T Seyboth Wild	6	6
(Colombia) DE Galán (Peru) A Merino	2	0
(Argentina) G Andreozzi (Argentina) TM Etcheverry	4	3
(Argentina) H Casanova (Argentina) S Rodríguez Taverna	6	6
(Argentina) F Coria (Slovenia) T Lipovšek Puches	3	7^{8}	[10]
4	(Argentina) P Cachin (Argentina) F Mena	6	6^{6}	[8]
(Dominican Republic) R Cid Subervi (Brazil) P Sakamoto	6	6
(Argentina) F Cerúndolo (Argentina) C Ugo Carabelli	1	2
(Brazil) Gilbert Klier Júnior (Brazil) M Pucinelli de Almeida	6	3	[10]
2	(Brazil) O Luz (Venezuela) LD Martínez	3	6	[4]

Quarterfinals
1	(Brazil) R Matos (Brazil) F Meligeni Alves	6	6
WC	(Brazil) M Alves (Brazil) OJ Gutierrez	3	0
3	(Netherlands) M Vervoort (Bolivia) F Zeballos	4	6	[8]
(Brazil) F Romboli (Brazil) T Seyboth Wild	6	4	[10]
(Argentina) H Casanova (Argentina) S Rodríguez Taverna	4	6	[10]
(Argentina) F Coria (Slovenia) T Lipovšek Puches	6	3	[7]
(Dominican Republic) R Cid Subervi (Brazil) P Sakamoto	2	4
(Brazil) G Klier Júnior (Brazil) M Pucinelli de Almeida	6	6

Semifinals
1	(Brazil) R Matos (Brazil) F Meligeni Alves	6	6
(Brazil) F Romboli (Brazil) T Seyboth Wild	2	1
(Argentina) H Casanova (Argentina) S Rodríguez Taverna	3	4
(Brazil) G Klier Júnior (Brazil) M Pucinelli de Almeida	6	6

Final
1	(Brazil) R Matos (Brazil) F Meligeni Alves	6	6
(Brazil) G Klier Júnior (Brazil) M Pucinelli de Almeida	3	1
