= 2021 Challenger de Santiago II – Singles =

Singles
- 2021 Challenger de Santiago II

Final
- Champion: (Peru) Juan Pablo Varillas
- Runner-up: (Argentina) Sebastián Báez
- Score: 6–4, 7–5

Events
Singles	Doubles
- Challenger de Santiago

Sebastián Báez was the defending champion but lost in the final to Juan Pablo Varillas.

Varillas won the title after defeating Báez 6–4, 7–5 in the final.

== Seeds ==
1. (Argentina) Juan Manuel Cerúndolo (first round)
2. (Argentina) Francisco Cerúndolo (semifinals)
3. (Peru) Juan Pablo Varillas (champion)
4. (Bolivia) Hugo Dellien (quarterfinals)
5. (Argentina) Sebastián Báez (final)
6. (Chile) Marcelo Tomás Barrios Vera (first round)
7. (Argentina) Juan Ignacio Londero (first round)
8. (Brazil) Felipe Meligeni Alves (first round)

== Draw ==
Key

- Q = Qualifier
- WC = Wild card
- LL = Lucky loser
- Alt = Alternate
- ITF = ITF entry
- PR = Protected ranking
- SR = Special ranking
- SE = Special exempt
- JE = Junior exempt
- JR = Junior Accelerator Programme entrant
- CO = College Accelerator Programme entrant
- NG = Next Gen Accelerator Program entrant
- w/o = Walkover
- r = Retired
- d = Defaulted

=== Finals ===
Semifinals
5	(Argentina) Sebastián Báez	6	6
(Chile) Nicolás Jarry	4	4
3	(Peru) Juan Pablo Varillas	6	6^{8}	6
2	(Argentina) Francisco Cerúndolo	3	7^{10}	3

Final
5	(Argentina) Sebastián Báez	4	5
3	(Peru) Juan Pablo Varillas	6	7

=== Top half ===
First round
1	(Argentina) JM Cerúndolo	0	1
(Argentina) N Kicker	6	6
(Dominican Republic) R Cid Subervi	4	7^{7}	5
(Argentina) F Mena	6	6^{2}	7
WC	(Chile) D Fernández Flores	3	6	5
Alt	(United States) N Chappell	6	3	7
(Czech Republic) D Svrčina	2	5
5	(Argentina) S Báez	6	7
4	(Bolivia) H Dellien	4	6	6
Alt	(Monaco) L Catarina	6	3	3
Q	(Peru) N Álvarez	5	1
(Argentina) C Ugo Carabelli	7	6
(Chile) N Jarry	6	6
(Argentina) JP Ficovich	4	4
Q	(Argentina) F Díaz Acosta	6	5	6
6	(Chile) MT Barrios Vera	3	7	1

Second round
(Argentina) N Kicker	4	4
(Argentina) F Mena	6	6
Alt	(United States) N Chappell	7	4	1
5	(Argentina) S Báez	5	6	6
4	(Bolivia) H Dellien	6	4	6
(Argentina) C Ugo Carabelli	2	6	2
(Chile) N Jarry	6^{4}	7	6
Q	(Argentina) F Díaz Acosta	7^{7}	5	4

Quarterfinals
(Argentina) F Mena	3	1
5	(Argentina) S Báez	6	6
4	(Bolivia) H Dellien	6^{4}	4
(Chile) N Jarry	7^{7}	6

Semifinals
5	(Argentina) S Báez	6	6
(Chile) N Jarry	4	4

=== Bottom half ===
First round
7	(Argentina) JI Londero	2	3
(Argentina) TA Tirante	6	6
PR	(Austria) G Melzer	6	6
(Argentina) G Andreozzi	2	4
WC	(Chile) Víctor Núñez	0	2
(Germany) J Lenz	6	6
Alt	(Argentina) H Casanova	6^{8}	6^{7}
3	(Peru) JP Varillas	7^{10}	7^{9}
8	(Brazil) F Meligeni Alves	6	3	4
WC	(Chile) G Lama	4	6	6
PR	(Portugal) G Oliveira	6	6
Q	(United States) O Crawford	4	2
(Brazil) M Pucinelli de Almeida	6	1	3
Q	(France) Alexis Gautier	4	6	6
LL	(Colombia) C Rodríguez	3	6	2
2	(Argentina) F Cerúndolo	6	3	6

Second round
(Argentina) TA Tirante	4	2
PR	(Austria) G Melzer	6	6
(Germany) J Lenz	2	4
3	(Peru) JP Varillas	6	6
WC	(Chile) G Lama	6	3	7
PR	(Portugal) G Oliveira	4	6	5
Q	(France) A Gautier	4	2
2	(Argentina) F Cerúndolo	6	6

Quarterfinals
PR	(Austria) G Melzer	1	3
3	(Peru) JP Varillas	6	6
WC	(Chile) G Lama	6^{6}	4
2	(Argentina) F Cerúndolo	7^{8}	6

Semifinals
3	(Peru) JP Varillas	6	6^{8}	6
2	(Argentina) F Cerúndolo	3	7^{10}	3
