= 2019 Campeonato Internacional de Tênis de Campinas =

- Date: 30 September – 6 October
- Edition: 8th
- Draw: 48S / 16D
- Surface: Clay
- Location: Campinas, Brazil

Champions

Singles
- (Peru) Juan Pablo Varillas

Doubles
- (Brazil) Orlando Luz / (Brazil) Rafael Matos
← 2018 ·	Campeonato Internacional de Tênis de Campinas	· 2020 →

The 2019 Campeonato Internacional de Tênis de Campinas was a professional tennis tournament played on clay courts. It was the eighth edition of the tournament which was part of the 2019 ATP Challenger Tour. It took place in Campinas, Brazil between 30 September and 6 October 2019.

== Singles main-draw entrants ==
=== Seeds ===
Country	Player	Rank^{1}	Seed
BOL	Hugo Dellien	82	1
ARG	Leonardo Mayer	100	2
BRA	Thiago Monteiro	108	3
ARG	Guido Andreozzi	113	4
ARG	Federico Coria	152	5
IND	Sumit Nagal	161	6
ARG	Facundo Bagnis	166	7
ARG	Facundo Mena	198	8
BRA	João Menezes	204	9
ARG	Andrea Collarini	215	10
CHI	Alejandro Tabilo	230	11
DOM	José Hernández-Fernández	265	12
ARG	Francisco Cerúndolo	266	13
ARG	Renzo Olivo	273	14
GER	Jeremy Jahn	281	15
BRA	Thomaz Bellucci	313	16

- ^{1} Rankings as of 23 September 2019.

=== Other entrants ===
The following players received wildcards into the singles main draw:

- (Brazil) Pedro Boscardin Dias
- (Brazil) Gilbert Klier Júnior
- (Brazil) Rafael Matos
- (Brazil) Matheus Pucinelli de Almeida
- (Brazil) João Lucas Reis da Silva

The following players received entry from the qualifying draw:

- (Brazil) Daniel Dutra da Silva
- (Brazil) Fernando Romboli

== Champions ==
=== Singles ===
- (Peru) Juan Pablo Varillas def. (Argentina) Juan Pablo Ficovich 2–6, 7–6^{(7–4)}, 6–2.

=== Doubles ===
- (Brazil) Orlando Luz / (Brazil) Rafael Matos def. (Mexico) Miguel Ángel Reyes-Varela / (Brazil) Fernando Romboli 6–7^{(2–7)}, 6–4, [10–8].
