= 2021 Challenger de Santiago III – Doubles =

Doubles
- 2021 Challenger de Santiago III

Final
- Champions: (United States) Evan King (United States) Max Schnur
- Runners-up: (Mexico) Hans Hach Verdugo (Mexico) Miguel Ángel Reyes-Varela
- Score: 3–6, 7–6^{(7–3)}, [16–14]

Events
Singles	Doubles
- Challenger de Santiago

Diego Hidalgo and Nicolás Jarry were the defending champions but only Hidalgo chose to defend his title, partnering Sergio Galdós. Hidalgo lost in the quarterfinals to Hans Hach Verdugo and Miguel Ángel Reyes-Varela.

Evan King and Max Schnur won the title after defeating Hach Verdugo and Reyes-Varela 3–6, 7–6^{(7–3)}, [16–14] in the final.

== Seeds ==
1. (Brazil) Rafael Matos / (Brazil) Felipe Meligeni Alves (quarterfinals)
2. (Venezuela) Luis David Martínez / (Portugal) Gonçalo Oliveira (semifinals)
3. (Mexico) Hans Hach Verdugo / (Mexico) Miguel Ángel Reyes-Varela (final)
4. (United States) Evan King / (United States) Max Schnur (champions)

== Draw ==
Key

- Q = Qualifier
- WC = Wild card
- LL = Lucky loser
- Alt = Alternate
- ITF = ITF entry
- PR = Protected ranking
- SR = Special ranking
- SE = Special exempt
- JE = Junior exempt
- JR = Junior Accelerator Programme entrant
- CO = College Accelerator Programme entrant
- NG = Next Gen Accelerator Program entrant
- w/o = Walkover
- r = Retired
- d = Defaulted

First round
1	(Brazil) R Matos (Brazil) F Meligeni Alves	w/o
(Canada) A Galarneau (Brazil) T Seyboth Wild
(Colombia) N Barrientos (Brazil) F Romboli	7^{7}	6
(United States) N Chappell (United States) R Stalder	6^{4}	3
3	(Mexico) H Hach Verdugo (Mexico) MÁ Reyes-Varela	w/o
(Chile) MT Barrios Vera (Spain) C Gómez-Herrera
WC	(Chile) Daniel Alejandro Ortiz (Chile) M Soto	5	4
(Peru) S Galdós (Ecuador) D Hidalgo	7	6
WC	(Chile) Amador Salazar Yáñez (Chile) Ricardo Urzúa Rivera	6	6
WC	(Chile) Víctor Núñez (Chile) Benjamín Torres	4	3
(Argentina) H Casanova (Argentina) F Díaz Acosta	3	2
4	(United States) E King (United States) M Schnur	6	6
(Chile) D Fernández Flores (Chile) Sebastián Santibáñez	w/o
(Argentina) F Cerúndolo (Argentina) C Ugo Carabelli
(Brazil) M Pucinelli de Almeida (Argentina) TA Tirante	3	7^{8}	[7]
2	(Venezuela) LD Martínez (Portugal) G Oliveira	6	6^{6}	[10]

Quarterfinals
1	(Brazil) R Matos (Brazil) F Meligeni Alves	6	4	[7]
(Colombia) N Barrientos (Brazil) F Romboli	2	6	[10]
3	(Mexico) H Hach Verdugo (Mexico) MÁ Reyes-Varela	6	6
(Peru) S Galdós (Ecuador) D Hidalgo	3	4
WC	(Chile) A Salazar Yáñez (Chile) R Urzúa Rivera	1	2
4	(United States) E King (United States) M Schnur	6	6
(Chile) D Fernández Flores (Chile) S Santibáñez	1	2
2	(Venezuela) LD Martínez (Portugal) G Oliveira	6	6

Semifinals
(Colombia) N Barrientos (Brazil) F Romboli	4	4
3	(Mexico) H Hach Verdugo (Mexico) MÁ Reyes-Varela	6	6
4	(United States) E King (United States) M Schnur	6	6
2	(Venezuela) LD Martínez (Portugal) G Oliveira	4	1

Final
3	(Mexico) H Hach Verdugo (Mexico) MÁ Reyes-Varela	6	6^{3}	[14]
4	(United States) E King (United States) M Schnur	3	7^{7}	[16]
