= 2018 Campeonato Internacional de Tênis de Campinas – Singles =

Singles
- 2018 Campeonato Internacional de Tênis de Campinas

Final
- Champion: (Chile) Cristian Garín
- Runner-up: (Argentina) Federico Delbonis
- Score: 6–3, 6–4

Events
| Singles | Doubles |
| ← 2016 · | Campeonato Internacional de Tênis de Campinas | · 2019 → |

Gastão Elias was the defending champion but lost in the first round to Camilo Ugo Carabelli.

Cristian Garín won the title after defeating Federico Delbonis 6–3, 6–4 in the final.

== Seeds ==
1. (Uruguay) Pablo Cuevas (first round)
2. (Argentina) Federico Delbonis (final)
3. (Bolivia) Hugo Dellien (first round)
4. (Brazil) Thiago Monteiro (semifinals)
5. (Argentina) Juan Ignacio Londero (first round)
6. (Argentina) Facundo Bagnis (semifinals)
7. (Argentina) Carlos Berlocq (quarterfinals)
8. (Chile) Cristian Garín (champion)

== Draw ==
=== Key ===
- Q = Qualifier
- WC = Wild card
- LL = Lucky loser
- Alt = Alternate
- SE = Special exempt
- PR = Protected ranking
- ITF = ITF entry
- JE = Junior exempt
- w/o = Walkover
- r = Retired
- d = Defaulted
- SR = Special ranking

=== Finals ===
Semifinals
8 | (Chile) Cristian Garín | 6 | 6
6 | (Argentina) Facundo Bagnis | 1 | 1
4 | (Brazil) Thiago Monteiro | 0 | 7^{7} | 2
2 | (Argentina) Federico Delbonis | 6 | 6^{3} | 6

Final
8 | (Chile) Cristian Garín | 6 | 6
2 | (Argentina) Federico Delbonis | 3 | 4

=== Top half ===
First round
1 | (Uruguay) P Cuevas | 4 | 7^{7} | 4
(United States) U Blanch | 6 | 6^{4} | 6
(Uruguay) M Cuevas | 6 | 7
(Argentina) H Casanova | 2 | 5
(Colombia) A González | 6 | 7^{7}
(Argentina) F Argüello | 3 | 6^{3}
(Brazil) G Clezar | 7^{7} | 6^{1} | 4
8 | (Chile) C Garín | 6^{5} | 7^{7} | 6
3 | (Bolivia) H Dellien | 1 | 7 | 4
WC | (Brazil) T Seyboth Wild | 6 | 5 | 6
Q | (Brazil) J Souza | 6^{5} | 6^{6}
(Italy) Fabrizio Ornago | 7^{7} | 7^{8}
(Portugal) G Elias | 4 | 2
Q | (Argentina) C Ugo Carabelli | 6 | 6
Q | (Ecuador) E Gómez | 4 | 6 | 1
6 | (Argentina) F Bagnis | 6 | 4 | 6

Second round
(United States) U Blanch | 3 | 6^{4}
(Uruguay) M Cuevas | 6 | 7^{7}
(Colombia) A González | 3 | 1
8 | (Chile) C Garín | 6 | 6
WC | (Brazil) T Seyboth Wild | 6 | 6
(Italy) F Ornago | 2 | 4
(Argentina) C Ugo Carabelli | 3 | 5
6 | (Argentina) F Bagnis | 6 | 7

Quarterfinals
(Uruguay) M Cuevas | 4 | 3
8 | (Chile) C Garín | 6 | 6
WC | (Brazil) T Seyboth Wild | 6^{3} | 7^{7} | 3
6 | (Argentina) F Bagnis | 7^{7} | 6^{4} | 6

Semifinals
8 | (Chile) C Garín | 6 | 6
6 | (Argentina) F Bagnis | 1 | 1

=== Bottom half ===
First round
5 | (Argentina) JI Londero | 4 | 3
(Brazil) T Bellucci | 6 | 6
(Chile) MT Barrios Vera | 6 | 6
WC | (Brazil) R Matos | 2 | 4
WC | (Brazil) M Pucinelli de Almeida | 1 | 6^{2}
(Argentina) A Collarini | 6 | 7^{7}
(Argentina) P Cachin | 4 | 2
4 | (Brazil) T Monteiro | 6 | 6
7 | (Argentina) C Berlocq | 6 | 6
PR | (Argentina) F Mena | 3 | 1
(Argentina) F Coria | 3 | 6 | 1
WC | (Brazil) F Meligeni Alves | 6 | 3 | 6
(Brazil) R Dutra Silva | 6 | 6
Q | (Peru) N Álvarez | 3 | 3
(Russia) A Zhurbin | 4 | 0
2 | (Argentina) F Delbonis | 6 | 6

Second round
(Brazil) T Bellucci | 7 | 4 | 7^{7}
(Chile) MT Barrios Vera | 5 | 6 | 6^{0}
(Argentina) A Collarini | 4 | 4
4 | (Brazil) T Monteiro | 6 | 6
7 | (Argentina) C Berlocq | 6 | 7^{7}
WC | (Brazil) F Meligeni Alves | 3 | 6^{2}
(Brazil) R Dutra Silva | 2 | 1
2 | (Argentina) F Delbonis | 6 | 6

Quarterfinals
(Brazil) T Bellucci | 6 | 2 | 1
4 | (Brazil) T Monteiro | 2 | 6 | 6
7 | (Argentina) C Berlocq | 2 | 0
2 | (Argentina) F Delbonis | 6 | 6

Semifinals
4 | (Brazil) T Monteiro | 0 | 7^{7} | 2
2 | (Argentina) F Delbonis | 6 | 6^{3} | 6
