= 2018 Campeonato Internacional de Tênis de Campinas – Doubles =

Doubles
- 2018 Campeonato Internacional de Tênis de Campinas

Final
- Champions: (Bolivia) Hugo Dellien; (Argentina) Guillermo Durán
- Runners-up: (Argentina) Franco Agamenone; (Brazil) Fernando Romboli
- Score: 7–5, 6–4

Events
Singles	Doubles
← 2016 ·	Campeonato Internacional de Tênis de Campinas	· 2019 →

Máximo González and Fabrício Neis were the defending champions but only Neis chose to defend his title, partnering Rafael Matos. Neis lost in the quarterfinals to Thiago Monteiro and Pedro Sakamoto.

Hugo Dellien and Guillermo Durán won the title after defeating Franco Agamenone and Fernando Romboli 7–5, 6–4 in the final.

== Seeds ==
1. (Argentina) Franco Agamenone / (Brazil) Fernando Romboli (final)
2. (Bolivia) Hugo Dellien / (Argentina) Guillermo Durán (champions)
3. (Brazil) Rafael Matos / (Brazil) Fabrício Neis (quarterfinals)
4. (Brazil) Caio Silva / (Brazil) Thales Turini (semifinals)

== Draw ==
=== Key ===
- Q = Qualifier
- WC = Wild card
- LL = Lucky loser
- Alt = Alternate
- SE = Special exempt
- PR = Protected ranking
- ITF = ITF entry
- JE = Junior exempt
- w/o = Walkover
- r = Retired
- d = Defaulted
- SR = Special ranking

First round

Quarterfinals

Semifinals

Final

1
- (Argentina) F Agamenone
- (Brazil) F Romboli
6
6

WC
- (Brazil) Christian Oliveira
- (Brazil) T Seyboth Wild
0
4

1
- (Argentina) F Agamenone
- (Brazil) F Romboli
7
6

- (Argentina) F Argüello
- (Argentina) H Casanova
4
6^{3}

- (Argentina) F Coria
- (Chile) C Garín
5
2

- (Argentina) F Coria
- (Chile) C Garín
6
7^{7}

1
- (Argentina) F Agamenone
- (Brazil) F Romboli
7^{7}
6

4
(Brazil) Caio Silva
(Brazil) T Turini
6^{5}
6
[11]

4
(Brazil) C Silva
(Brazil) T Turini
6^{3}
3

- (Argentina) P Cachin
- (Uruguay) M Cuevas
7^{7}
3
[9]

4
(Brazil) C Silva
(Brazil) T Turini
w/o

PR
- (Argentina) A Collarini
- (Argentina) F Mena
2
2

- (Argentina) F Bagnis
- (Argentina) C Berlocq

- (Argentina) F Bagnis
- (Argentina) C Berlocq
6
6

1
- (Argentina) F Agamenone
- (Brazil) F Romboli
5
4

WC
- (Brazil) Breno Lodis
- (Brazil) M Pucinelli de Almeida
3
3

2
- (Bolivia) H Dellien
- (Argentina) G Durán
7
6

- (Brazil) T Monteiro
- (Brazil) P Sakamoto
6
6

- (Brazil) T Monteiro
- (Brazil) P Sakamoto
7^{7}
6^{7}
[12]

- (Brazil) G Clezar
- (Colombia) A González

3
- (Brazil) R Matos
- (Brazil) F Neis
6^{2}
7^{9}
[10]

3
- (Brazil) R Matos
- (Brazil) F Neis
w/o

- (Brazil) T Monteiro
- (Brazil) P Sakamoto

WC
- (Brazil) F Meligeni Alves
- (Brazil) JP Sorgi
4
6^{3}

2
- (Bolivia) H Dellien
- (Argentina) G Durán
w/o

- (Argentina) T Lipovšek Puches
- (Argentina) JI Londero
6
7^{7}

- (Argentina) T Lipovšek Puches
- (Argentina) JI Londero
6^{4}
3

- (Portugal) G Elias
- (Brazil) O Luz
4
3

2
- (Bolivia) H Dellien
- (Argentina) G Durán
7^{7}
6

2
- (Bolivia) H Dellien
- (Argentina) G Durán
6
6
