= 2019 Campeonato Internacional de Tênis de Campinas – Doubles =

Doubles
- 2019 Campeonato Internacional de Tênis de Campinas

Final
- Champions: (Brazil) Orlando Luz (Brazil) Rafael Matos
- Runners-up: (Mexico) Miguel Ángel Reyes-Varela (Brazil) Fernando Romboli
- Score: 6–7^{(2–7)}, 6–4, [10–8]

Events
Singles	Doubles
← 2018 ·	Campeonato Internacional de Tênis de Campinas	· 2020 →

Hugo Dellien and Guillermo Durán were the defending champions but only Dellien chose to defend his title, partnering Federico Zeballos. Dellien and Zeballos withdrew before their quarterfinal match.

Orlando Luz and Rafael Matos won the title after defeating Miguel Ángel Reyes-Varela and Fernando Romboli 6–7^{(2–7)}, 6–4, [10–8] in the final.

== Seeds ==
1. (Mexico) Miguel Ángel Reyes-Varela / (Brazil) Fernando Romboli (final)
2. (Peru) Sergio Galdós / (Argentina) Leonardo Mayer (semifinals, withdrew)
3. (Venezuela) Luis David Martínez / (Brazil) Felipe Meligeni Alves (semifinals)
4. (Brazil) Orlando Luz / (Brazil) Rafael Matos (champions)

== Draw ==
=== Key ===
- Q = Qualifier
- WC = Wild card
- LL = Lucky loser
- Alt = Alternate
- SE = Special exempt
- PR = Protected ranking
- ITF = ITF entry
- JE = Junior exempt
- w/o = Walkover
- r = Retired
- d = Defaulted
- SR = Special ranking

First round
1	(Mexico) MÁ Reyes-Varela (Brazil) F Romboli	6	6
(Argentina) R Olivo (Argentina) Matías Zukas	4	3
(Peru) N Álvarez (Argentina) F Bagnis	6	3	[8]
(Uruguay) M Cuevas (Argentina) F Mena	2	6	[10]
3	(Venezuela) LD Martínez (Brazil) F Meligeni Alves	3	6	[10]
(Brazil) T Monteiro (Brazil) P Sakamoto	6	3	[6]
WC	(Brazil) G Clezar (Brazil) A Ghem	5	3
(Brazil) J Menezes (Chile) A Tabilo	7	6
WC	(Brazil) Gilbert Klier Júnior (Brazil) T Seyboth Wild	6^{6}	3
(Argentina) F Coria (India) S Nagal	7^{8}	6
(Dominican Republic) J Hernández-Fernández (Ecuador) D Hidalgo	6^{4}	4
4	(Brazil) O Luz (Brazil) R Matos	7^{7}	6
(Argentina) F Cerúndolo (Argentina) JP Ficovich	6^{8}	5
(Bolivia) H Dellien (Bolivia) F Zeballos	7^{10}	7
WC	(Brazil) M Pucinelli de Almeida (Brazil) JL Reis da Silva	6^{3}	6^{2}
2	(Peru) S Galdós (Argentina) L Mayer	7^{7}	7^{7}

Quarterfinals
1	(Mexico) MÁ Reyes-Varela (Brazil) F Romboli	6	6
(Uruguay) M Cuevas (Argentina) F Mena	4	3
3	(Venezuela) LD Martínez (Brazil) F Meligeni Alves	7	6
(Brazil) J Menezes (Chile) A Tabilo	5	4
(Argentina) F Coria (India) S Nagal
4	(Brazil) O Luz (Brazil) R Matos	w/o
(Bolivia) H Dellien (Bolivia) F Zeballos
2	(Peru) S Galdós (Argentina) L Mayer	w/o

Semifinals
1	(Mexico) MÁ Reyes-Varela (Brazil) F Romboli	6^{4}	7^{7}	[10]
3	(Venezuela) LD Martínez (Brazil) F Meligeni Alves	7^{7}	6^{5}	[7]
4	(Brazil) O Luz (Brazil) R Matos	w/o
2	(Peru) S Galdós (Argentina) L Mayer

Final
1	(Mexico) MÁ Reyes-Varela (Brazil) F Romboli	7^{7}	4	[8]
4	(Brazil) O Luz (Brazil) R Matos	6^{2}	6	[10]
