= 2021 Challenger de Santiago – Doubles =

Doubles
- 2021 Challenger de Santiago

Final
- Champions: (Venezuela) Luis David Martínez (Portugal) Gonçalo Oliveira
- Runners-up: (Brazil) Rafael Matos (Brazil) Felipe Meligeni Alves
- Score: 7–5, 6–1

Events
Singles	Doubles
- Challenger de Santiago

Franco Agamenone and Fernando Romboli were the defending champions but chose not to defend their title.

Luis David Martínez and Gonçalo Oliveira won the title after defeating Rafael Matos and Felipe Meligeni Alves 7–5, 6–1 in the final.

== Seeds ==
1. (Venezuela) Luis David Martínez / (Portugal) Gonçalo Oliveira (champions)
2. (Brazil) Rafael Matos / (Brazil) Felipe Meligeni Alves (final)
3. (Peru) Sergio Galdós / (Argentina) Facundo Mena (semifinals)
4. (Brazil) Orlando Luz / (Argentina) Renzo Olivo (first round)

== Draw ==
Key

- Q = Qualifier
- WC = Wild card
- LL = Lucky loser
- Alt = Alternate
- ITF = ITF entry
- PR = Protected ranking
- SR = Special ranking
- SE = Special exempt
- JE = Junior exempt
- JR = Junior Accelerator Programme entrant
- CO = College Accelerator Programme entrant
- NG = Next Gen Accelerator Program entrant
- w/o = Walkover
- r = Retired
- d = Defaulted

First round
(Bolivia) B Arias (Bolivia) F Zeballos	6	6
WC	(Chile) Hanamichi Carvajal (Chile) Benjamín Torres	2	4
4	(Brazil) O Luz (Argentina) R Olivo	0	5
(Uruguay) M Cuevas (Peru) JP Varillas	6	7
(Chile) Víctor Núñez (Argentina) G Villanueva	3	2
(France) G Blancaneaux (Belgium) K Coppejans	6	6
(Argentina) TM Etcheverry (Argentina) C Ugo Carabelli
(Chile) MT Barrios Vera (Spain) C Gómez-Herrera	w/o
(Argentina) G Andreozzi (Argentina) A Collarini
WC	(Chile) Daniel Antonio Núñez (Chile) Sebastián Santibáñez	w/o

Quarterfinals
1	(Venezuela) LD Martínez (Portugal) G Oliveira	6	6
(Bolivia) B Arias (Bolivia) F Zeballos	4	3
(Uruguay) M Cuevas (Peru) JP Varillas	6	6
(France) G Blancaneaux (Belgium) K Coppejans	2	4
(Chile) MT Barrios Vera (Spain) C Gómez-Herrera
3	(Peru) S Galdós (Argentina) F Mena	w/o
WC	(Chile) DA Núñez (Chile) S Santibáñez	5	2
2	(Brazil) R Matos (Brazil) F Meligeni Alves	7	6

Semifinals
1	(Venezuela) LD Martínez (Portugal) G Oliveira	6	6^{5}	[10]
(Uruguay) M Cuevas (Peru) JP Varillas	3	7^{7}	[3]
3	(Peru) S Galdós (Argentina) F Mena	4	4
2	(Brazil) R Matos (Brazil) F Meligeni Alves	6	6

Final
1	(Venezuela) LD Martínez (Portugal) G Oliveira	7	6
2	(Brazil) R Matos (Brazil) F Meligeni Alves	5	1
