= 2021 Challenger de Santiago =

- Date: 15–21 March
- Edition: 13th
- Draw: 32S / 16D
- Surface: Clay
- Location: Santiago, Chile

Champions

Singles
- (Argentina) Sebastián Báez

Doubles
- (Venezuela) Luis David Martínez / (Portugal) Gonçalo Oliveira
- Challenger de Santiago

The 2021 Challenger de Santiago was a professional tennis tournament played on clay courts. It was the 13th edition of the tournament which was part of the 2021 ATP Challenger Tour. It took place in Santiago, Chile between 15 and 21 March 2021.

== Singles main-draw entrants ==
=== Seeds ===
Country	Player	Rank^{1}	Seed
ESP	Roberto Carballés Baena	97	1
SVK	Andrej Martin	104	2
POR	Pedro Sousa	110	3
~~ARG~~	~~Facundo Bagnis~~	~~118~~	~~4~~
SVK	Jozef Kovalík	129	5
GER	Daniel Altmaier	143	6
BEL	Kimmer Coppejans	165	7
CHI	Alejandro Tabilo	168	8

- ^{1} Rankings are as of 8 March 2021.

=== Other entrants ===
The following players received wildcards into the singles main draw:

- (Chile) Nicolás Jarry
- (Chile) Gonzalo Lama
- (Denmark) Holger Rune

The following player received entry into the singles main draw as an alternate:

- (Argentina) Camilo Ugo Carabelli

The following players received entry from the qualifying draw:

- (Uruguay) Martín Cuevas
- (Argentina) Nicolás Kicker
- (Brazil) João Menezes
- (Argentina) Gonzalo Villanueva

The following player received entry as a lucky loser:

- (Brazil) Rafael Matos

== Champions ==
=== Singles ===
- (Argentina) Sebastián Báez def. (Chile) Marcelo Tomás Barrios Vera 6–3, 7–6^{(7–4)}.

=== Doubles ===
- (Venezuela) Luis David Martínez / (Portugal) Gonçalo Oliveira def. (Brazil) Rafael Matos / (Brazil) Felipe Meligeni Alves 7–5, 6–1.
