= Kyiv Open =

- 2021 Kyiv Open
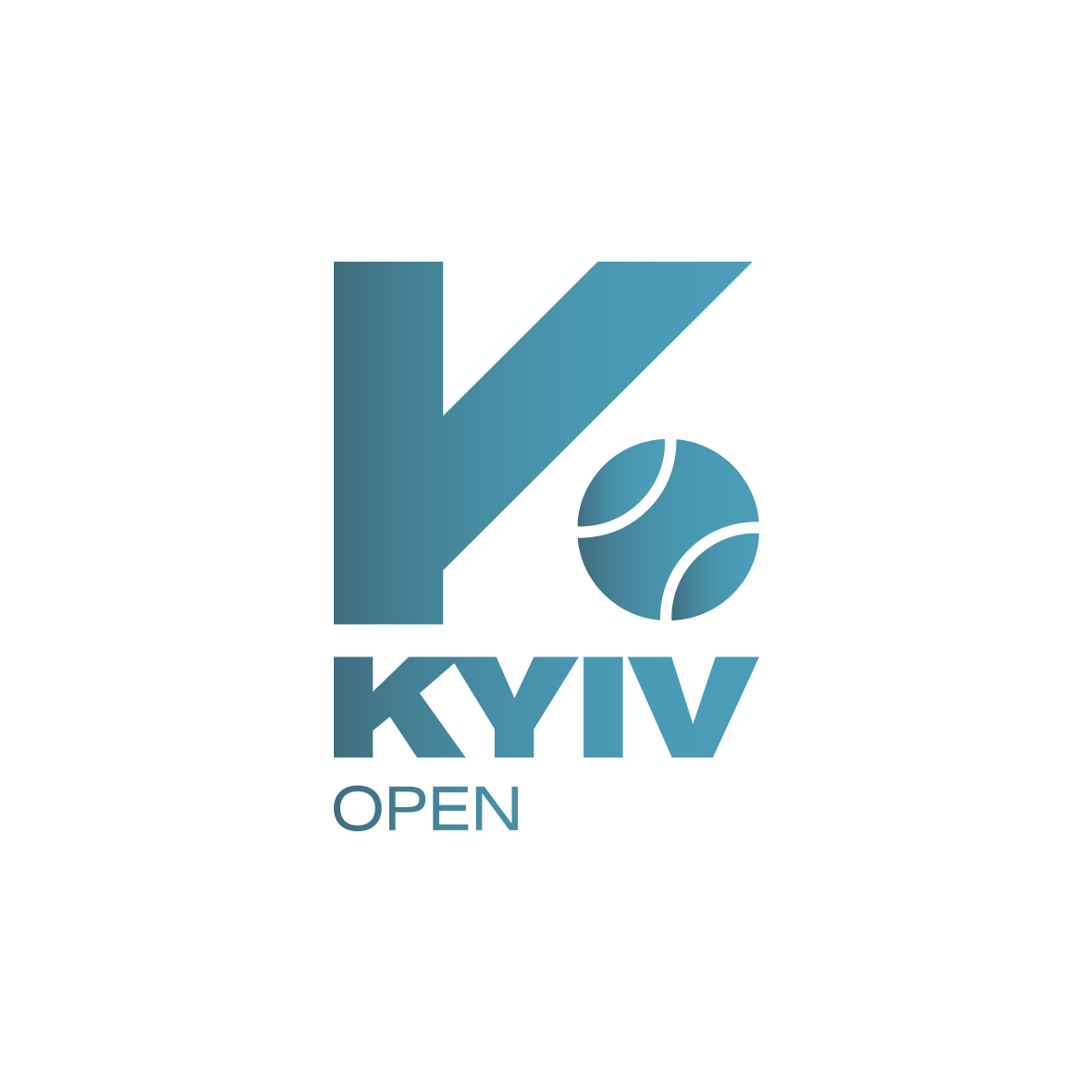

Defunct tennis tournament
- Event name: Kyiv Open
- Location: Kyiv, Ukraine
- Venue: Tennis Park
- Category: Challenger 80
- Surface: Clay
- Draw: 32S/32Q/16D
- Prize money: $44,820 (2021), $52,000
- Website: website

The Kyiv Open was a professional tennis tournament played on clay courts. It was part of the ATP Challenger Tour. The tournament was held annually in Kyiv, Ukraine from 1995 to 2005. After 15 years of break, the tournament returned in 2021.

== History ==
The Kyiv Open in the status of ATP Challenger competitions was held from 1998 to 2005. During this time, such world tennis stars as Nicolás Almagro, Fernando Verdasco, Marc Rosset, Irakli Labadze, Nenad Zimonjić, Ján Krošlák took part in it. The first steps in the professional arena were taken by Sergey Stakhovsky, Orest Tereshchuk, Sergey Yaroshenko, Mikhail Filima, Aleksandr Nedovyesov.

After 15 years of break, the ATP Challenger competition returned in 2021.

== Past finals ==
=== Singles ===
Year	Champion	Runner-up	Score
2021	(Italy) Franco Agamenone	(Argentina) Sebastián Báez	7–5, 6–2

=== Doubles ===
Year	Champions	Runners-up	Score
2021	(Brazil) Orlando Luz (Kazakhstan) Aleksandr Nedovyesov	(Ukraine) Denys Molchanov (Ukraine) Sergiy Stakhovsky	6–4, 6–4
