= 2022 Campeonato Internacional de Tênis de Campinas =

- Date: 3–9 October
- Edition: 11th
- Surface: Clay
- Location: Campinas, Brazil

Champions

Singles
- (United Kingdom) Jan Choinski

Doubles
- (Bolivia) Boris Arias / (Bolivia) Federico Zeballos
- Campeonato Internacional de Tênis de Campinas

The 2022 Campeonato Internacional de Tênis de Campinas was a professional tennis tournament played on clay courts. It was the eleventh edition of the tournament which was part of the 2022 ATP Challenger Tour. It took place in Campinas, Brazil between 3 and 9 October 2022.

== Singles main-draw entrants ==
=== Seeds ===
Country	Player	Rank^{1}	Seed
GER	Daniel Altmaier	96	1
PER	Juan Pablo Varillas	106	2
ARG	Facundo Bagnis	112	3
~~ARG~~	~~Camilo Ugo Carabelli~~	~~118~~	~~4~~
ARG	Juan Pablo Ficovich	138	5
BRA	Felipe Meligeni Alves	143	6
FRA	Alexandre Müller	152	7
ARG	Facundo Mena	156	8

- ^{1} Rankings as of 26 September 2022.

=== Other entrants ===
The following players received wildcards into the singles main draw:

- (Brazil) Matheus Bueres
- (Brazil) Eduardo Ribeiro
- (Brazil) Thiago Seyboth Wild

The following player received entry into the singles main draw using a protected ranking:

- (India) Sumit Nagal

The following players received entry into the singles main draw as alternates:

- (Argentina) Nicolás Kicker
- (Spain) Pol Martín Tiffon
- (Argentina) Genaro Alberto Olivieri
- (Argentina) Juan Bautista Torres

The following players received entry from the qualifying draw:

- (United Kingdom) Jan Choinski
- (Argentina) Facundo Juárez
- (Argentina) Juan Pablo Paz
- (Brazil) José Pereira
- (Spain) Daniel Rincón
- (Argentina) Gonzalo Villanueva

The following players received entry as lucky losers:

- (Switzerland) Rémy Bertola
- (Brazil) Wilson Leite

== Champions ==
=== Singles ===
- (United Kingdom) Jan Choinski def. (Peru) Juan Pablo Varillas 6–4, 6–4.

=== Doubles ===
- (Bolivia) Boris Arias / (Bolivia) Federico Zeballos def. (Argentina) Guido Andreozzi / (Argentina) Guillermo Durán 7–5, 6–2.
