= 2021 Challenger de Santiago II =

- Date: 4–10 October
- Edition: 14th
- Surface: Clay
- Location: Santiago, Chile

Champions

Singles
- (Peru) Juan Pablo Varillas

Doubles
- (Ecuador) Diego Hidalgo / (Chile) Nicolás Jarry
- Challenger de Santiago

The 2021 Challenger de Santiago II was a professional tennis tournament played on clay courts. It was the 14th edition of the tournament which was part of the 2021 ATP Challenger Tour. It took place in Santiago, Chile between 4 and 10 October 2021.

== Singles main-draw entrants ==
=== Seeds ===
Country	Player	Rank^{1}	Seed
ARG	Juan Manuel Cerúndolo	103	1
ARG	Francisco Cerúndolo	110	2
PER	Juan Pablo Varillas	117	3
BOL	Hugo Dellien	140	4
ARG	Sebastián Báez	143	5
CHI	Marcelo Tomás Barrios Vera	155	6
ARG	Juan Ignacio Londero	157	7
BRA	Felipe Meligeni Alves	202	8

- ^{1} Rankings are as of 27 September 2021.

=== Other entrants ===
The following players received wildcards into the singles main draw:

- (Chile) Diego Fernández Flores
- (Chile) Gonzalo Lama
- (Chile) Víctor Núñez

The following players received entry into the singles main draw using protected rankings:

- (Austria) Gerald Melzer
- (Portugal) Gonçalo Oliveira

The following players received entry into the singles main draw as alternates:

- (Argentina) Hernán Casanova
- (Monaco) Lucas Catarina
- (United States) Nick Chappell

The following players received entry from the qualifying draw:

- (Peru) Nicolás Álvarez
- (United States) Oliver Crawford
- (Argentina) Facundo Díaz Acosta
- (France) Alexis Gautier

The following player received entry as a lucky loser:

- (Colombia) Cristian Rodríguez

== Champions ==
=== Singles ===
- (Peru) Juan Pablo Varillas def. (Argentina) Sebastián Báez 6–4, 7–5.

=== Doubles ===
- (Ecuador) Diego Hidalgo / (Chile) Nicolás Jarry def. (United States) Evan King / (United States) Max Schnur 6–3, 5–7, [10–6].
