= Sebastián Báez =

Argentine tennis player (born 2000)

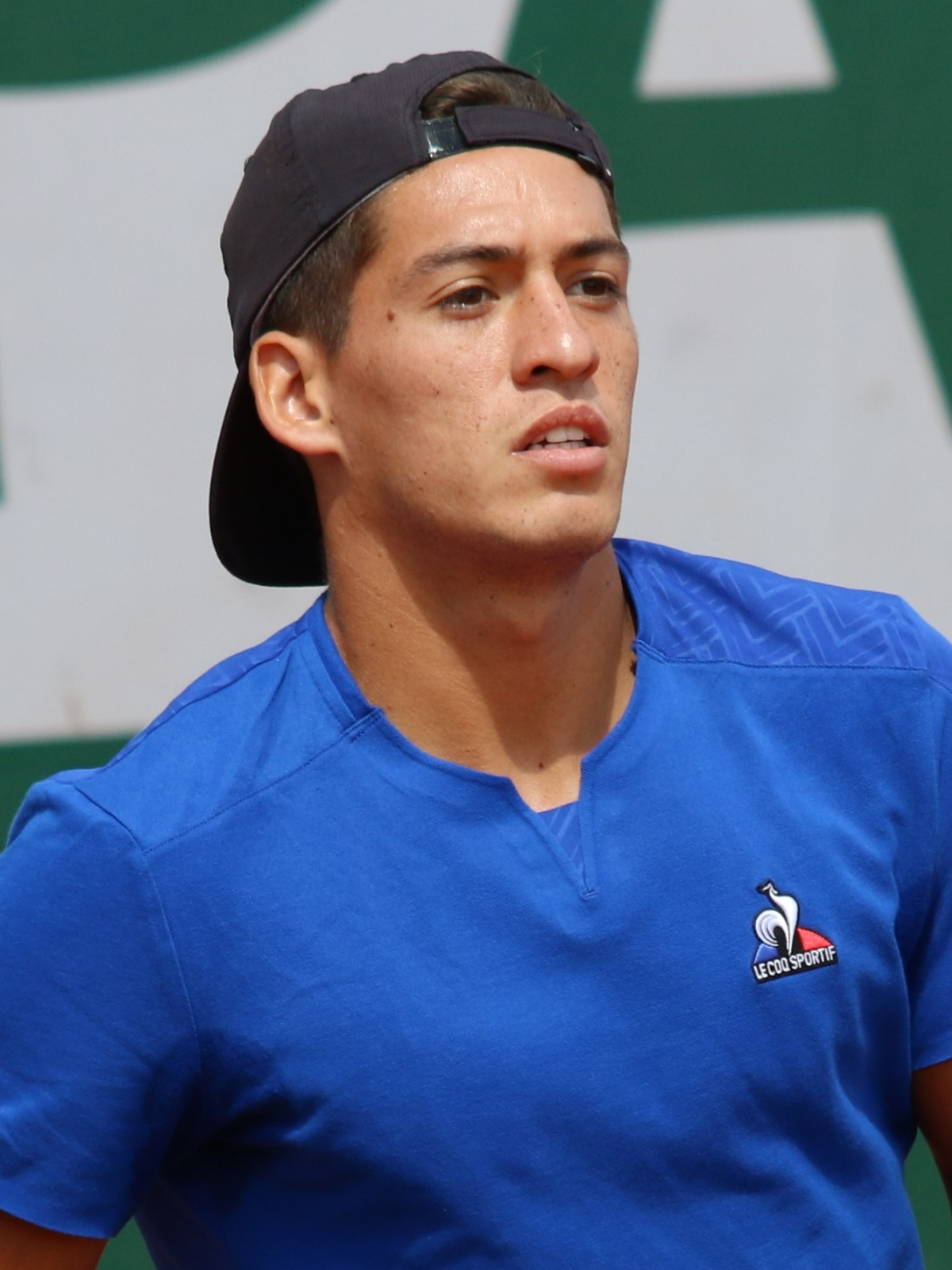
- Báez at the 2022 French Open
- Country (sports): Argentina
- Residence: Buenos Aires, Argentina
- Born: 28 December 2000 (age 25) Buenos Aires, Argentina
- Height: 1.70 m (5 ft 7 in)
- Turned pro: 2018
- Plays: Right-handed (two-handed backhand)
- Coach: Sebastián Gutiérrez
- Prize money: US $7,175,312

Singles
- Career record: 132–131
- Career titles: 7
- Highest ranking: No. 18 (24 June 2024)
- Current ranking: No. 51 (9 November 2026)

Grand Slam singles results
- Australian Open: 3R (2024)
- French Open: 2R (2022, 2024)
- Wimbledon: 2R (2022)
- US Open: 3R (2023)

Other tournaments
- Olympic Games: 3R (2024)

Doubles
- Career record: 10–39
- Career titles: 0
- Highest ranking: No. 189 (29 July 2024)

Grand Slam doubles results
- Australian Open: 1R (2023, 2024, 2025, 2026)
- French Open: 2R (2024)
- Wimbledon: 3R (2024)
- US Open: 1R (2022, 2023, 2026)
Medal record
Men's tennis
Representing Argentina
Summer Youth Olympics
Gold medal – first place	2018 Buenos Aires	Doubles
- Last updated on: 31 August 2026.

Sebastián Báez (Spanish pronunciation: [seβasˈtjam ˈbaes]; (Note: In isolation, Sebastián is pronounced [seβasˈtjan].) born 28 December 2000) is an Argentine professional tennis player. He has a career-high ATP singles ranking of world No. 18 achieved on 24 June 2024 and a best doubles ranking of No. 189 reached on 29 July 2024.

Báez reached an ITF junior combined ranking of world No. 1 on 12 March 2018.

Báez has won seven ATP Tour singles titles. He represents Argentina at the Davis Cup.

== Career ==
=== 2021: ATP debut, six Challenger titles, NextGen finals & top 100 ===
Báez made his ATP debut at the 2021 Chile Open where he lost to 2019 Junior French Open champion Holger Rune in straight sets.

He earned his first tour-level win at the 2021 Hamburg European Open, where he defeated Frenchman Corentin Moutet in the first round.

Báez became the youngest player in history to claim five ATP Challenger Tour titles in a season, lifting the trophy in Concepción (d. F. Cerundolo), Santiago (d. Barrios Vera), Zagreb (d. Varillas), Santiago-3 (d. Meligeni Rodrigues Alves) and Buenos Aires (d. Monteiro). He qualified for the 2021 Next Generation ATP Finals in Milan after the withdrawal of Jenson Brooksby due to an abdominal injury. Baez advanced to the semifinals with wins over third seed Lorenzo Musetti and eighth seed Hugo Gaston. He lost in the semifinals against top seed Carlos Alcaraz.

He reached the top 100 for the first time in his career at World No. 97 in the ATP year-end rankings on 22 November 2021 after winning his sixth Challenger in Campinas, Brazil.

=== 2022: Major debut & first wins, Maiden title & Top-10 win, Top 35 ===
Baez started the year in the 2022 Melbourne Summer Set 1 where he lost in the final round of qualifying and got in the main draw as a lucky loser. He was defeated by Emil Ruusuvuori in straight sets on the first round. The following week at the 2022 Sydney International, Baez got entry as a qualifier and defeated Christopher O'Connell in three sets. He lost in the second round to Lorenzo Sonego.

On his debut at the 2022 Australian Open he defeated Albert Ramos Viñolas for his first Grand Slam win in his career. In the second round he faced a top-10 opponent for the first time in his career, World No. 4 Stefanos Tsitsipas. He lost in four sets in a hard-fought match. As a result, he entered the top 80 at World No. 77 on 31 January 2022.

He reached his first ATP-level quarterfinal at the 2022 Córdoba Open, defeating Fernando Verdasco and World No. 18 and third seed Cristian Garín. Baez received a wildcard in his hometown tournament, the 2022 Argentina Open, where he defeated Holger Rune and lost again to Lorenzo Sonego in the second round. The following week at the 2022 Rio Open, he surpassed the qualyifing stages with three-set wins against Nikola Milojević and Yannick Hanfmann. He was defeated by Thiago Monteiro in the first round.

At the 2022 Chile Open Baez was the 7th seed, the first time he was seeded in an ATP tournament. He reached his maiden ATP Tour final, defeating Juan Pablo Varillas, fellow countryman Juan Ignacio Londero, Thiago Monteiro and Albert Ramos Viñolas in the semifinals. He lost to Pedro Martínez in the final. As a result, he reached the top 60 on 7 March 2022.

At the 2022 Estoril Open Baez reached the second semifinal of the season defeating third seed Marin Čilić and Richard Gasquet en route. As a result of reaching the semifinals, he debuted in the top 50. Next he defeated Albert Ramos Viñolas to reach his second final of the season and of his career. He won his maiden title defeating third seed Frances Tiafoe and moved into the top 40 on 2 May 2022.

He made his debut at the 2022 French Open and at the 2022 Wimbledon Championships and won his first match at each of the Majors defeating Dušan Lajović and Taro Daniel respectively.

He reached his third final at the 2022 Swedish Open in Båstad with a win over second seed, top-10 player Andrey Rublev, where he lost to compatriot Francisco Cerúndolo. He reached a career-high ranking of No. 32 on 18 July 2022.

In October seeded sixth, he defeated No. 50 Lorenzo Sonego at the 2022 Tennis Napoli Cup and snapped an 11-match losing streak.

=== 2023: Three ATP titles, top 30, US Open third round ===
In February, he won the second title of his career at the Córdoba Open in Argentina, defeating Luciano Darderi, Tomás Barrios Vera, Hugo Dellien, and compatriot Federico Coria on clay.

He reached the top 30 in the rankings on 17 April 2023 following the 2023 Monte-Carlo Masters.

In August, Báez won the third and fourth titles of his career as part of a ten-match winning streak. He won the singles title at the Austrian Open Kitzbühel on clay, defeating Dominic Thiem in the final in straight sets. Next, he won the singles title at the 2023 Winston-Salem Open on hardcourts, defeating Jiří Lehečka in the final also in straight sets.

At the US Open he reached the third round of a Major for the first time defeating 27th seed Borna Ćorić and Felipe Meligeni Alves before losing to eventual finalist and third seed Daniil Medvedev.

=== 2024–2025: First Rio repeat champion, Latin American No. 1, top 20, 100th win ===
Following the 2024 Australian Open where he reached a Grand Slam third round for the second time in his career, he moved to a new career-high into the top 25 in the singles rankings. As the defending champion, at the 2024 Córdoba Open, he reached the semifinals for a second consecutive year but lost to qualifier Luciano Darderi. Seeded fifth, he reached the biggest final of his career at the 2024 Rio Open defeating fourth seed and compatriot Francisco Cerúndolo. He won his fifth and biggest title defeating qualifier and first time ATP finalist, compatriot Mariano Navone. As a result, he moved to a new career-high ranking of world No. 21 on 26 February 2024. The following week, at the 2024 Chile Open he won his second title of the season defeating home favorite Alejandro Tabilo. Báez became the Latin American No. 1 player when he reached a new career-high ranking in the top 20 of world No. 19 on 4 March 2024, overtaking Francisco Cerúndolo. He was one of only 20 Argentines ever to reach said heights.

Seeded fifth again at the 2025 Rio Open, Báez reached back-to-back finals becoming just the third player to reach multiple finals in tournament history after Diego Schwartzman and Carlos Alcaraz. He successfully defended his title against Alexandre Müller to become the first Rio champion to win the title twice, and in consecutive years. At the next Golden Swing tournament 2025 Chile Open, Báez reached the quarterfinals defeating his compatriot Francisco Comesaña with whom he shares the same coach. Next he defeated Damir Džumhur to reach the semifinals. Baez went on to reach back-to-back finals recording his 100th career win in the process, over compatriot Camilo Ugo Carabelli, the first South American, born in the 2000s, to accomplish the feat.

== Performance timeline ==
Key
W	F	SF	QF	#R	RR	Q#	DNQ	A	NH

(W) winner; (F) finalist; (SF) semifinalist; (QF) quarterfinalist; (#R) rounds 4, 3, 2, 1; (RR) round-robin stage; (Q#) qualification round; (DNQ) did not qualify; (A) absent; (NH) not held; (SR) strike rate (events won / competed); (W–L) win–loss record.
To avoid confusion and double counting, these charts are updated at the conclusion of a tournament or when the player's participation has ended.

=== Singles ===
Current through the 2026 Paris Masters.

Tournament	2021	2022	2023	2024	2025	2026	2027	SR	W–L	Win %
Grand Slam tournaments
Australian Open	A	2R	1R	3R	1R	2R		0 / 5	4–5	44%
French Open	Q1	2R	1R	2R	1R	1R		0 / 5	2–5	29%
Wimbledon	Q1	2R	1R	1R	1R	1R		0 / 5	1–5	17%
US Open	Q3	1R	3R	2R	1R	1R		0 / 4	3–5	43%
Win–loss	0–0	3–4	2–4	4–4	0–4	1–4		0 / 19	10–20	34%
National representation
Summer Olympics	A	NH		3R	NH			0 / 1	2–1	67%
ATP Masters 1000
Indian Wells	A	1R	3R	3R	1R	3R		0 / 5	4–5	44%
Miami Open	A	1R	2R	2R	1R	1R		0 / 5	0–5	0%
Monte-Carlo Masters	A	1R	1R	1R	1R	2R		0 / 5	1–5	17%
Madrid Open	A	A	3R	3R	2R	1R		0 / 4	2–4	33%
Italian Open	A	2R	2R	4R	2R	2R		0 / 5	5–5	50%
Canadian Open	A	1R	A	A	A	2R		0 / 2	1–2	33%
Cincinnati Open	A	1R	A	2R	2R	2R		0 / 4	3–4	43%
Shanghai Masters	NH		3R	2R	2R	2R		0 / 4	3–4	43%
Paris Masters	A	1R	1R	1R	1R	1R		0 / 5	0–5	0%
Win–loss	0–0	1–7	4–7	5–8	2–8	7–9		0 / 39	19–39	33%
Career statistics
Tournaments	2	28	29	28	25	26		138		
Titles	0	1	3	2	1	0		7		
Finals	0	3	3	2	3	1		12		
Overall win–loss	3–3	26–30	31–26	31–28	17–24	25–26		133–137		
Win Percentage	50%	46%	54%	53%	41%	49%		49.26%		
Year-end ranking	97	43	28	27	45			$6,794,745		

== ATP Tour finals ==
=== Singles: 12 (7 titles, 5 runner-ups) ===
Legend Grand Slam (–) ATP 1000 (–) ATP 500 (2–0) ATP 250 (5–5)	Finals by surface Hard (1–1) Clay (6–4) Grass (–)	Finals by setting Outdoor (7–5) Indoor (–)

Result	W–L	Date	Tournament	Tier	Surface	Opponent	Score
Loss	0–1	Feb 2022	Chile Open, Chile	ATP 250	Clay	(Spain) Pedro Martínez	6–4, 4–6, 4–6
Win	1–1	Apr 2022	Estoril Open, Portugal	ATP 250	Clay	(United States) Frances Tiafoe	6–3, 6–2
Loss	1–2	Jul 2022	Swedish Open, Sweden	ATP 250	Clay	(Argentina) Francisco Cerúndolo	6–7^{(4–7)}, 2–6
Win	2–2	Feb 2023	Córdoba Open, Argentina	ATP 250	Clay	(Argentina) Federico Coria	6–1, 3–6, 6–3
Win	3–2	Aug 2023	Austrian Open, Austria	ATP 250	Clay	(Austria) Dominic Thiem	6–3, 6–1
Win	4–2	Aug 2023	Winston-Salem Open, US	ATP 250	Hard	(Czech Republic) Jiří Lehečka	6–4, 6–3
Win	5–2	Feb 2024	Rio Open, Brazil	ATP 500	Clay	(Argentina) Mariano Navone	6–2, 6–1
Win	6–2	Mar 2024	Chile Open, Chile	ATP 250	Clay	(Chile) Alejandro Tabilo	3–6, 6–0, 6–4
Win	7–2	Feb 2025	Rio Open, Brazil (2)	ATP 500	Clay	(France) Alexandre Müller	6–2, 6–3
Loss	7–3	Feb 2025	Chile Open, Chile	ATP 250	Clay	(Serbia) Laslo Djere	4–6, 6–3, 5–7
Loss	7–4	Apr 2025	Țiriac Open, Romania	ATP 250	Clay	(Italy) Flavio Cobolli	4–6, 4–6
Loss	7–5	Jan 2026	Auckland Open, New Zealand	ATP 250	Hard	(Czech Republic) Jakub Menšík	3–6, 6–7^{(7–9)}

== ATP Challenger Tour finals ==
=== Singles: 11 (7 titles, 4 runner-ups) ===
Legend ATP Challenger (7–4)	Finals by surface Hard (0–1) Clay (7–3)

Result	W–L	Date	Tournament	Tier	Surface	Opponent	Score
Win	1–0	Feb 2021	Challenger Concepción, Chile	Challenger	Clay	(Argentina) Francisco Cerúndolo	6–3, 6–7^{(5–7)}, 7–6^{(7–5)}
Win	2–0	Mar 2021	Challenger de Santiago, Chile	Challenger	Clay	(Chile) Tomás Barrios Vera	6–3, 7–6^{(7–4)}
Win	3–0	May 2021	Zagreb Open, Croatia	Challenger	Clay	(Peru) Juan Pablo Varillas	3–6, 6–3, 6–1
Loss	3–1	June 2021	Slovak Open, Slovakia	Challenger	Clay	(Netherlands) Tallon Griekspoor	6–7^{(6–8)}, 3–6
Loss	3–2	Sep 2021	Kyiv Open, Ukraine	Challenger	Clay	(Italy) Franco Agamenone	5–7, 2–6
Loss	3–3	Oct 2021	Challenger de Santiago II, Chile	Challenger	Clay	(Peru) Juan Pablo Varillas	4–6, 5–7
Win	4–3	Oct 2021	Challenger de Santiago III, Chile	Challenger	Clay	(Brazil) Felipe Meligeni Alves	3–6, 7–6^{(8–6)}, 6–1
Win	5–3	Oct 2021	Buenos Aires Challenger, Argentina	Challenger	Clay	(Brazil) Thiago Monteiro	6–4, 6–0
Win	6–3	Nov 2021	Internacional de Campinas, Brazil	Challenger	Clay	(Brazil) Thiago Monteiro	6–1, 6–4
Win	7–3	Jun 2026	Czech Open, Czech Republic	Challenger	Clay	(Slovakia) Alex Molčan	6–4, 6–2
Loss	7–4	Aug 2026	Cancún Country Open, Mexico	Challenger	Hard	(Poland) Hubert Hurkacz	6–4, 0–6, 3–6

== ITF World Tour finals ==
=== Singles: 8 (5 titles, 3 runner-ups) ===
Legend ITF WTT (5–3)	Finals by surface Hard (1–0) Clay (4–3)

Result	W–L	Date	Tournament	Tier	Surface	Opponent	Score
Win	1–0	Apr 2019	M15 Buenos Aires, Argentina	WTT	Clay	(Argentina) Agustín Velotti	6–4, 6–0
Win	2–0	Jun 2019	M15 Tabarka, Tunisia	WTT	Clay	(Italy) Alexander Weis	6–2, 6–4
Loss	2–1	Jul 2019	M15 Tabarka, Tunisia	WTT	Clay	(Italy) Enrico Dalla Valle	6–3, 4–6, 4–6
Win	3–1	Jul 2019	M15 Tabarka, Tunisia	WTT	Clay	(Italy) Alexander Weis	6–2, 6–2
Loss	3–2	Sep 2019	M15 Santiago, Chile	WTT	Clay	(Argentina) Juan Manuel Cerúndolo	1–6, 6–2, 3–6
Win	4–2	Oct 2019	M25 Rio de Janeiro, Brazil	WTT	Clay	(Argentina) Tomás Martín Etcheverry	4–6, 6–4, 4–1 ret.
Win	5–2	Jan 2020	M15 Monastir, Tunisia	WTT	Hard	(Belgium) Gauthier Onclin	6–1, 6–2
Loss	5–3	Sep 2020	M25 Prague, Czech Republic	WTT	Clay	(Czech Republic) Jiří Lehečka	6–3, 3–6, 4–6

=== Doubles: 3 (1 title, 2 runner-ups) ===
Legend ITF Futures/WTT (1–2)

Result	W–L	Date	Tournament	Tier	Surface	Partner	Opponents	Score
Loss	0–1	Apr 2018	Turkey F3, Antalya	Futures	Clay	(Argentina) Juan Pablo Paz	(Czech Republic) Vít Kopřiva (Czech Republic) Jaroslav Pospíšil	2–6, 0–6
Loss	0–2	Jun 2019	M15 Tabarka, Tunisia	WTT	Clay	(Spain) Nikolás Sánchez Izquierdo	(Argentina) Nicolás Bianchi (Argentina) Genaro Olivieri	4–6, 7–5, [4–10]
Win	1–2	Sep 2020	M25 Prague, Czech Republic	WTT	Clay	(Argentina) Pedro Cachín	(Austria) Lucas Miedler (Poland) Jan Zieliński	7–6^{(7–4)}, 6–1

== Junior Grand Slam finals ==
=== Singles: 1 (runner-up) ===
Result	Year	Tournament	Surface	Opponent	Score
Loss	2018	French Open	Clay	(Chinese Taipei) Tseng Chun-hsin	6–7^{(5–7)}, 2–6

== Wins over top 10 players ==
- Báez has a 3–18 record against players who were, at the time the match was played, ranked in the top 10.

Season	2022	2023	2024	2025	2026	Total
Wins	1	0	0	0	2	3

#	Player	Rk	Event	Surface	Rd	Score	Rk	Ref
2022
1.	Andrey Rublev	8	Swedish Open, Sweden	Clay	SF	6–2, 6–4	34	
2026
2.	(United States) Taylor Fritz	6	United Cup, Australia	Hard	RR	4–6, 7–5, 6–4	45	
3.	(United States) Ben Shelton	8	Auckland Open, New Zealand	Hard	QF	7–5, 6–3	39	

*As of 16 January 2026

== Longest winning streaks ==
=== 12-match win streak (2023) ===
No.	Tournament	Tier	Start date	Surface	Rd	Opponent	Rk	Score
–	Hamburg Open	ATP 500	23 July 2023	Clay	1R	(Norway) Casper Ruud (1)	4	3–6, 6–1, 3–6
1	Generali Open Kitzbühel	ATP 250	31 July 2023	Clay	1R	(Serbia) Hamad Medjedovic (Q)	168	6–4, 6–2
2	Generali Open Kitzbühel	ATP 250	31 July 2023	Clay	2R	(Spain) Roberto Carballés Baena	64	6–1, 6–2
3	Generali Open Kitzbühel	ATP 250	31 July 2023	Clay	QF	(Slovakia) Alex Molčan	81	6–4, 6–3
4	Generali Open Kitzbühel	ATP 250	31 July 2023	Clay	SF	(Argentina) Tomás Martín Etcheverry (1)	34	7–6^{(7–5)}, 3–6, 6–4
5	Generali Open Kitzbühel	ATP 250	31 July 2023	Clay	F	(Austria) Dominic Thiem (WC)	94	6–3, 6–1
–	Winston-Salem Open	ATP 250	20 August 2023	Hard	1R	Bye		
6	Winston-Salem Open	ATP 250	20 August 2023	Hard	2R	(Colombia) Daniel Elahi Galán	67	3–6, 6–4, 6–4
7	Winston-Salem Open	ATP 250	20 August 2023	Hard	3R	(Australia) Aleksandar Vukic (9)	48	6–4, 4–6, 6–4
8	Winston-Salem Open	ATP 250	20 August 2023	Hard	QF	(Serbia) Laslo Djere (4)	34	6–3, 6–0
9	Winston-Salem Open	ATP 250	20 August 2023	Hard	SF	(Croatia) Borna Ćorić (1)	16	6–3, 6–7^{(4–7)}, 7–6^{(7–2)}
10	Winston-Salem Open	ATP 250	20 August 2023	Hard	F	(Czech Republic) Jiří Lehečka (5)	35	6–4, 6–3
11	US Open	Grand Slam	28 August 2023	Hard	1R	(Croatia) Borna Ćorić (27)	23	7–5, 7–5, 6–1
12	US Open	Grand Slam	28 August 2023	Hard	2R	(Brazil) Felipe Meligeni Alves (Q)	168	6–7^{(7–9)}, 6–4, 6–4, ret.
–	US Open	Grand Slam	28 August 2023	Hard	3R	Daniil Medvedev (3)	3	2–6, 2–6, 6–7^{(6–8)}

=== 10-match win streak (2024) ===
No.	Tournament	Tier	Start date	Surface	Rd	Opponent	Rk	Score
–	Argentina Open	ATP 250	12 February 2024	Clay	QF	(Argentina) Federico Coria (SE)	106	1–6, 4–6
1	Rio Open	ATP 500	19 February 2024	Clay	1R	(France) Corentin Moutet (Q)	147	6–4, 6–3
2	Rio Open	ATP 500	19 February 2024	Clay	2R	(Argentina) Facundo Díaz Acosta	59	7–6^{(7–1)}, 6–1
3	Rio Open	ATP 500	19 February 2024	Clay	QF	(Brazil) Thiago Monteiro (WC)	117	6–4, 1–6, 6–2
4	Rio Open	ATP 500	19 February 2024	Clay	SF	(Argentina) Francisco Cerúndolo (4)	22	7–5, 6–0
5	Rio Open	ATP 500	19 February 2024	Clay	F	(Argentina) Mariano Navone (Q)	113	6–2, 6–1
–	Chile Open	ATP 250	24 February 2024	Clay	1R	Bye		
6	Chile Open	ATP 250	24 February 2024	Clay	2R	(Peru) Juan Pablo Varillas	119	4–6, 6–4, 6–2
7	Chile Open	ATP 250	24 February 2024	Clay	QF	(Spain) Jaume Munar	70	6–4, 6–4
8	Chile Open	ATP 250	24 February 2024	Clay	SF	(Spain) Pedro Martínez	101	6–4, 6–2
9	Chile Open	ATP 250	24 February 2024	Clay	F	(Chile) Alejandro Tabilo (4)	51	3–6, 6–0, 6–4
–	Indian Wells Masters	ATP 1000	6 March 2024	Hard	1R	Bye		
10	Indian Wells Masters	ATP 1000	6 March 2024	Hard	2R	(Italy) Fabio Fognini (WC)	108	7–5, 6–3
	Indian Wells Masters	ATP 1000	6 March 2024	Hard	3R	(United States) Taylor Fritz (12)	12	2–6, 2–6
