= 2024 Maia Challenger – Doubles =

Doubles
- 2024 Maia Challenger

Final
- Champions: (France) Théo Arribagé (Portugal) Francisco Cabral
- Runners-up: (Belgium) Kimmer Coppejans (Spain) Sergio Martos Gornés
- Score: 6–1, 3–6, [10–5]

Events
Singles	Doubles
← 2023 ·	Maia Challenger	· 2025 →

Marco Bortolotti and Andrea Vavassori were the defending champions but only Bortolotti chose to defend his title, partnering David Pel. They lost in the first round to Alexandru Jecan and Giorgio Ricca.

Théo Arribagé and Francisco Cabral won the title after defeating Kimmer Coppejans and Sergio Martos Gornés 6–1, 3–6, [10–5] in the final.

== Seeds ==
1. (India) Sriram Balaji / (India) Rithvik Choudary Bollipalli (quarterfinals)
2. (France) Théo Arribagé / (Portugal) Francisco Cabral (champions)
3. (Romania) Victor Vlad Cornea / (Netherlands) Mick Veldheer (semifinals)
4. (Italy) Marco Bortolotti / (Netherlands) David Pel (first round)

== Draw ==
Key

- Q = Qualifier
- WC = Wild card
- LL = Lucky loser
- Alt = Alternate
- ITF = ITF entry
- PR = Protected ranking
- SR = Special ranking
- SE = Special exempt
- JE = Junior exempt
- JR = Junior Accelerator Programme entrant
- CO = College Accelerator Programme entrant
- NG = Next Gen Accelerator Program entrant
- w/o = Walkover
- r = Retired
- d = Defaulted

=== Draw ===
First round
1	(India) S Balaji (India) RC Bollipalli	6^{6}	7^{8}	[11]
(Spain) Í Cervantes (Austria) D Pichler	7^{8}	6^{6}	[9]
(Serbia) I Sabanov (Serbia) M Sabanov	7^{7}	6
I Liutarevich (Kazakhstan) D Yevseyev	6^{4}	1
4	(Italy) M Bortolotti (Netherlands) D Pel	5	6^{4}
(Romania) A Jecan (Italy) G Ricca	7	7^{7}
PR	(Belgium) K Coppejans (Spain) S Martos Gornés	6	7^{7}
WC	(Portugal) Pedro Araújo (Portugal) Diogo Marques	4	6^{1}
(France) M Janvier (Ukraine) V Uzhylovskyi	2	6^{4}
WC	(Portugal) João Silva (Portugal) Tiago Silva	6	7^{7}
(Portugal) Francisco Rocha (Portugal) H Rocha	3	2
3	(Romania) V Cornea (Netherlands) M Veldheer	6	6
(Sweden) F Bergevi (Denmark) J Ingildsen	3	5
Alt	(Spain) N Álvarez Varona (Spain) N Sánchez Izquierdo	6	7
(Portugal) T Pereira (Spain) D Vega Hernández	4	3
2	(France) T Arribagé (Portugal) F Cabral	6	6

Quarterfinals
1	(India) S Balaji (India) RC Bollipalli	6	3	[6]
(Serbia) I Sabanov (Serbia) M Sabanov	3	6	[10]
(Romania) A Jecan (Italy) G Ricca	2	6^{7}
PR	(Belgium) K Coppejans (Spain) S Martos Gornés	6	7^{9}
WC	(Portugal) J Silva (Portugal) T Silva	3	6^{4}
3	(Romania) V Cornea (Netherlands) M Veldheer	6	7^{7}
Alt	(Spain) N Álvarez Varona (Spain) N Sánchez Izquierdo	1	1
2	(France) T Arribagé (Portugal) F Cabral	6	6

Semifinals
(Serbia) I Sabanov (Serbia) M Sabanov	6^{5}	6	[8]
PR	(Belgium) K Coppejans (Spain) S Martos Gornés	7^{7}	1	[10]
3	(Romania) V Cornea (Netherlands) M Veldheer	4	3
2	(France) T Arribagé (Portugal) F Cabral	6	6

Final
PR	(Belgium) K Coppejans (Spain) S Martos Gornés	1	6	[5]
2	(France) T Arribagé (Portugal) F Cabral	6	3	[10]
