= 2019 Maia Challenger – Doubles =

Doubles
- 2019 Maia Challenger

Final
- Champions: (Germany) Andre Begemann (Germany) Daniel Masur
- Runners-up: (Spain) Guillermo García López (Spain) David Vega Hernández
- Score: 7–6^{(7–2)}, 6–4

Events
Singles	Doubles
Maia Challenger	· 2020 →

This was the first edition of the tournament.

Andre Begemann and Daniel Masur won the title after defeating Guillermo García López and David Vega Hernández 7–6^{(7–2)}, 6–4 in the final.

== Seeds ==
1. (Monaco) Romain Arneodo / (United States) Nicholas Monroe (first round)
2. (Bosnia and Herzegovina) Tomislav Brkić / (Croatia) Ante Pavić (quarterfinals)
3. (Switzerland) Luca Margaroli / (Italy) Andrea Vavassori (first round)
4. (United Kingdom) Scott Clayton / (India) Purav Raja (first round)

== Draw ==
=== Key ===
- Q = Qualifier
- WC = Wild card
- LL = Lucky loser
- Alt = Alternate
- SE = Special exempt
- PR = Protected ranking
- ITF = ITF entry
- JE = Junior exempt
- w/o = Walkover
- r = Retired
- d = Defaulted
- SR = Special ranking

First round
1	(Monaco) R Arneodo (United States) N Monroe	3	7	[8]
(Poland) K Drzewiecki (Poland) S Walków	6	5	[10]
(Russia) T Gabashvili (Russia) P Kotov	6	3	[10]
WC	(Portugal) N Borges (Portugal) F Cabral	4	6	[4]
4	(United Kingdom) S Clayton (India) P Raja	3	2
WC	(Portugal) Gonçalo Falcão (Portugal) P Sousa	6	6
Alt	(Turkey) A Çelikbilek (Czech Republic) V Kopřiva	4	2
(Spain) G García López (Spain) D Vega Hernández	6	6
WC	(Portugal) T Cação (Portugal) João Monteiro	7^{7}	3	[10]
(Croatia) T Draganja (Czech Republic) Z Kolář	6^{4}	6	[3]
(India) S Mukund (India) VS Prashanth	0	6	[11]
3	(Switzerland) L Margaroli (Italy) A Vavassori	6	4	[9]
(Germany) A Begemann (Germany) D Masur	6	4	[10]
(Spain) S Martos Gornés (Australia) S Puodziunas	4	6	[7]
(Russia) I Nedelko (Kazakhstan) D Yevseyev	1	4
2	(Bosnia and Herzegovina) T Brkić (Croatia) A Pavić	6	6

Quarterfinals
(Poland) K Drzewiecki (Poland) S Walków	6^{5}	7	[7]
(Russia) T Gabashvili (Russia) P Kotov	7^{7}	5	[10]
WC	(Portugal) G Falcão (Portugal) P Sousa	1	4
(Spain) G García López (Spain) D Vega Hernández	6	6
WC	(Portugal) T Cação (Portugal) J Monteiro	6^{6}	4
(India) S Mukund (India) VS Prashanth	7^{8}	6
(Germany) A Begemann (Germany) D Masur	7^{7}	4	[10]
2	(Bosnia and Herzegovina) T Brkić (Croatia) A Pavić	6^{4}	6	[7]

Semifinals
(Russia) T Gabashvili (Russia) P Kotov	3	4
(Spain) G García López (Spain) D Vega Hernández	6	6
(India) S Mukund (India) VS Prashanth	7^{7}	3	[9]
(Germany) A Begemann (Germany) D Masur	6^{3}	6	[11]

Final
(Spain) G García López (Spain) D Vega Hernández	6^{2}	4
(Germany) A Begemann (Germany) D Masur	7^{7}	6
