= 2019 Maia Challenger – Singles =

Singles
- 2019 Maia Challenger

Final
- Champion: (Slovakia) Jozef Kovalík
- Runner-up: (France) Constant Lestienne
- Score: 6–0, 6–4

Events
Singles	Doubles
Maia Challenger	· 2020 →

This was the first edition of the tournament.

Jozef Kovalík won the title after defeating Constant Lestienne 6–0, 6–4 in the final.

== Seeds ==
All seeds receive a bye into the second round.

1. (Slovakia) Andrej Martin (semifinals)
2. (Italy) Thomas Fabbiano (second round)
3. (Italy) Paolo Lorenzi (quarterfinals)
4. (Italy) Gianluca Mager (third round)
5. (Hungary) Attila Balázs (third round)
6. (Canada) Steven Diez (withdrew)
7. (Spain) Guillermo García López (second round)
8. (Portugal) Pedro Sousa (third round)
9. (Serbia) Nikola Milojević (second round)
10. (Slovakia) Jozef Kovalík (champion)
11. (Portugal) Frederico Ferreira Silva (withdrew)
12. (United States) Maxime Cressy (third round)
13. (Italy) Roberto Marcora (quarterfinals)
14. (Portugal) João Domingues (semifinals)
15. (Egypt) Mohamed Safwat (second round)
16. (Italy) Filippo Baldi (third round)

== Draw ==
=== Key ===
- Q = Qualifier
- WC = Wild card
- LL = Lucky loser
- Alt = Alternate
- SE = Special exempt
- PR = Protected ranking
- ITF = ITF entry
- JE = Junior exempt
- w/o = Walkover
- r = Retired
- d = Defaulted
- SR = Special ranking

=== Finals ===
Quarterfinals
1	(Slovakia) Andrej Martin	6	6
Alt	(Italy) Riccardo Bonadio	4	4
3	(Italy) Paolo Lorenzi	5	5
10	(Slovakia) Jozef Kovalík	7	7
(France) Constant Lestienne	6	6^{6}	6
13	(Italy) Roberto Marcora	3	7^{8}	3
Q	(Italy) Andrea Vavassori	2	4
14	(Portugal) João Domingues	6	6

Semifinals
1	(Slovakia) Andrej Martin	1	4
10	(Slovakia) Jozef Kovalík	6	6
(France) Constant Lestienne	1	7^{7}	6
14	(Portugal) João Domingues	6	6^{5}	2

Final
10	(Slovakia) Jozef Kovalík	6	6
(France) Constant Lestienne	0	4

=== Top half ===
==== Section 1 ====
First round
(Croatia) V Galović	3	6
(Italy) GM Moroni	6	7
(Czech Republic) V Kopřiva	6	6
WC	(Portugal) Luís Faria	0	2
Alt	(Italy) R Bonadio	4	7^{7}	6
(Russia) T Gabashvili	6	6^{3}	1
(Italy) R Brancaccio	4	4
PR	(Spain) J Martí	6	6

Second round
1	(Slovakia) A Martin	6	7
(Italy) GM Moroni	2	5
(Czech Republic) V Kopřiva	2	6	6
15	(Egypt) M Safwat	6	4	4
9	(Serbia) N Milojević	6	2	2
Alt	(Italy) R Bonadio	4	6	6
PR	(Spain) J Martí	3	6	4
8	(Portugal) P Sousa	6	4	6

Third round
1	(Slovakia) A Martin	7	2	6
(Czech Republic) V Kopřiva	5	6	0
Alt	(Italy) R Bonadio	4	6	7
8	(Portugal) P Sousa	6	2	5

Quarterfinals
1	(Slovakia) A Martin	6	6
Alt	(Italy) R Bonadio	4	4

==== Section 2 ====
First round
WC	(Portugal) T Cação	4	7^{8}	3
(Austria) J Rodionov	6	6^{6}	6
(Serbia) P Krstin	6	7
(Kazakhstan) D Yevseyev	4	5
(Russia) P Kotov	6^{2}	0
(Russia) A Karatsev	7^{7}	3^{r}
(Spain) R Ortega Olmedo	1	6^{9}
WC	(Portugal) N Borges	6	7^{11}

Second round
3	(Italy) P Lorenzi	3	7^{7}	7^{7}
(Austria) J Rodionov	6	6^{4}	6^{3}
(Serbia) P Krstin	6	4	0
16	(Italy) F Baldi	2	6	6
10	(Slovakia) J Kovalík	6	6
(Russia) P Kotov	0	1
WC	(Portugal) N Borges	6^{0}	4
5	(Hungary) A Balázs	7^{7}	6

Third round
3	(Italy) P Lorenzi	1	7^{9}	6
16	(Italy) F Baldi	6	6^{7}	3
10	(Slovakia) J Kovalík	6	7
5	(Hungary) A Balázs	4	5

Quarterfinals
3	(Italy) P Lorenzi	5	5
10	(Slovakia) J Kovalík	7	7

=== Bottom half ===
==== Section 3 ====
First round
Q	(Italy) Fabrizio Ornago	2	2
(France) C Lestienne	6	6
PR	(Spain) Í Cervantes	1	4
(Russia) I Nedelko	6	6
(Italy) A Arnaboldi	6	7
PR	(Spain) C Gómez-Herrera	1	5
WC	(Portugal) João Monteiro	2	2
(Czech Republic) Z Kolář	6	6

Second round
7	(Spain) G García López	4	3
(France) C Lestienne	6	6
(Russia) I Nedelko	6^{5}	6^{5}
12	(United States) M Cressy	7^{7}	7^{7}
13	(Italy) R Marcora	6	2	6
(Italy) A Arnaboldi	3	6	4
(Czech Republic) Z Kolář	4	1
4	(Italy) G Mager	6	6

Third round
(France) C Lestienne	6	6
12	(United States) M Cressy	3	0
13	(Italy) R Marcora	3	6	6
4	(Italy) G Mager	6	2	3

Quarterfinals
(France) C Lestienne	6	6^{6}	6
13	(Italy) R Marcora	3	7^{8}	3

==== Section 4 ====
First round
Q	(Italy) A Vavassori	2	6	6
(Norway) V Durasovic	6	1	0
(Spain) C Taberner	6	6
(Turkey) A Çelikbilek	2	2
WC	(Portugal) F Cabral	4	2
PR	(Austria) M Neuchrist	6	6
(Germany) D Masur	6	6
(India) S Mukund	3	0

Second round
LL	(Portugal) Fábio Coelho	4	1
Q	(Italy) A Vavassori	6	6
(Spain) C Taberner	4	5
LL	(France) M Hamou	6	7
14	(Portugal) J Domingues	7	6
PR	(Austria) M Neuchrist	5	1
(Germany) D Masur	6	2	6
2	(Italy) T Fabbiano	4	6	3

Third round
Q	(Italy) A Vavassori	6	7^{11}
LL	(France) M Hamou	2	6^{9}
14	(Portugal) J Domingues	7^{7}	6
(Germany) D Masur	6^{3}	2

Quarterfinals
Q	(Italy) A Vavassori	2	4
14	(Portugal) J Domingues	6	6
