= 2024 Maia Challenger – Singles =

Singles
- 2024 Maia Challenger

Final
- Champion: (Bosnia and Herzegovina) Damir Džumhur
- Runner-up: (Italy) Francesco Passaro
- Score: 6–3, 6–4

Events
Singles	Doubles
- Maia Challenger

Nuno Borges was the defending champion but chose not to defend his title.

Damir Džumhur won the title after defeating Francesco Passaro 6–3, 6–4 in the final.

== Seeds ==
1. (Italy) Fabio Fognini (withdrew)
2. (Argentina) Federico Coria (semifinals)
3. (Bosnia and Herzegovina) Damir Džumhur (champion)
4. (Italy) Francesco Passaro (final)
5. (Spain) Albert Ramos Viñolas (quarterfinals)
6. (Denmark) Elmer Møller (first round)
7. (Spain) Alejandro Moro Cañas (second round)
8. (Portugal) Henrique Rocha (quarterfinals)

== Draw ==
Key

- Q = Qualifier
- WC = Wild card
- LL = Lucky loser
- Alt = Alternate
- ITF = ITF entry
- PR = Protected ranking
- SR = Special ranking
- SE = Special exempt
- JE = Junior exempt
- JR = Junior Accelerator Programme entrant
- CO = College Accelerator Programme entrant
- NG = Next Gen Accelerator Program entrant
- w/o = Walkover
- r = Retired
- d = Defaulted

=== Finals ===
Semifinals
Q	(Slovakia) Andrej Martin	6	2	1
4	(Italy) Francesco Passaro	2	6	6
3	(Bosnia and Herzegovina) Damir Džumhur	6	6
2	(Argentina) Federico Coria	4	3

Final
4	(Italy) Francesco Passaro	3	4
3	(Bosnia and Herzegovina) Damir Džumhur	6	6

=== Top half ===
First round
Q	(Spain) Àlex Martí Pujolràs	5	0
WC	(Portugal) Pedro Araújo	7	6
Q	(Slovakia) A Martin	6	6
WC	(Portugal) Francisco Rocha	3	2
Q	(Spain) N Álvarez Varona	6	7
Alt	I Gakhov	3	5
LL	(United Kingdom) A Matusevich	6	4	6^{6}
8	(Portugal) H Rocha	2	6	7^{8}
4	(Italy) F Passaro	6	6
(France) M Janvier	2	4
LL	(Lithuania) V Gaubas	7	6
(Lithuania) E Butvilas	5	4
Alt	(Netherlands) J Sels	5	2
Alt	(Spain) D Mérida	7	6
(Spain) P Martín Tiffon	6	2	6
6	(Denmark) E Møller	3	6	2

Second round
WC	(Portugal) P Araújo	7^{7}	4	3
Q	(Slovakia) A Martin	6^{4}	6	6
Q	(Spain) N Álvarez Varona	4	2
8	(Portugal) H Rocha	6	6
4	(Italy) F Passaro	1	6	6
LL	(Lithuania) V Gaubas	6	3	2
Alt	(Spain) D Mérida	6	6
(Spain) P Martín Tiffon	4	4

Quarterfinals
Q	(Slovakia) A Martin	7	6
8	(Portugal) H Rocha	5	3
4	(Italy) F Passaro	6	6
Alt	(Spain) D Mérida	1	4

Semifinals
Q	(Slovakia) A Martin	6	2	1
4	(Italy) F Passaro	2	6	6

=== Bottom half ===
First round
5	(Spain) A Ramos Viñolas	6	6
Q	(Spain) N Sánchez Izquierdo	4	4
(Spain) D Rincón	7	2	6
(Kazakhstan) D Yevseyev	5	6	3
Q	(Netherlands) Ryan Nijboer	5	3
Q	(Ukraine) O Ovcharenko	7	6
WC	(Portugal) F Ferreira Silva	6	2	6^{5}
3	(Bosnia and Herzegovina) D Džumhur	2	6	7^{7}
7	(Spain) A Moro Cañas	6	6
(Jordan) A Shelbayh	4	4
PR	(Belgium) K Coppejans	6	6
(Italy) Samuel Vincent Ruggeri	4	0
(Bulgaria) A Andreev	7^{7}	7
Alt	(France) G Debru	6^{4}	5
(France) G Blancaneaux	1	0^{r}
2	(Argentina) F Coria	6	1

Second round
5	(Spain) A Ramos Viñolas	6	4	6
(Spain) D Rincón	1	6	3
Q	(Ukraine) O Ovcharenko	0	5
3	(Bosnia and Herzegovina) D Džumhur	6	7
7	(Spain) A Moro Cañas	4	1
PR	(Belgium) K Coppejans	6	6
(Bulgaria) A Andreev
2	(Argentina) F Coria	w/o

Quarterfinals
5	(Spain) A Ramos Viñolas	1	0
3	(Bosnia and Herzegovina) D Džumhur	6	6
PR	(Belgium) K Coppejans	3	6	6^{4}
2	(Argentina) F Coria	6	4	7^{7}

Semifinals
3	(Bosnia and Herzegovina) D Džumhur	6	6
2	(Argentina) F Coria	4	3
