= 2021 Maia Challenger – Singles =

Singles
- 2021 Maia Challenger

Final
- Champion: (France) Geoffrey Blancaneaux
- Runner-up: (Chinese Taipei) Tseng Chun-hsin
- Score: 3–6, 6–3, 6–2

Events
| Singles | Doubles |
- Maia Challenger

Pedro Sousa was the defending champion but chose not to defend his title.

Geoffrey Blancaneaux won the title after defeating Tseng Chun-hsin 3–6, 6–3, 6–2 in the final.

== Seeds ==
1. (Slovakia) Andrej Martin (semifinals)
2. (Belgium) Kimmer Coppejans (quarterfinals)
3. (Portugal) Gastão Elias (quarterfinals, withdrew)
4. (Portugal) João Domingues (second round)
5. (Portugal) Nuno Borges (semifinals)
6. (Chinese Taipei) Tseng Chun-hsin (final)
7. (Canada) Steven Diez (first round)
8. (France) Geoffrey Blancaneaux (champion)

== Draw ==
Key

- Q = Qualifier
- WC = Wild card
- LL = Lucky loser
- Alt = Alternate
- ITF = ITF entry
- PR = Protected ranking
- SR = Special ranking
- SE = Special exempt
- JE = Junior exempt
- JR = Junior Accelerator Programme entrant
- CO = College Accelerator Programme entrant
- NG = Next Gen Accelerator Program entrant
- w/o = Walkover
- r = Retired
- d = Defaulted

=== Finals ===
Semifinals
1 | (Slovakia) Andrej Martin | 4 | 5
6 | (Chinese Taipei) Tseng Chun-hsin | 6 | 7
8 | (France) Geoffrey Blancaneaux | 7^{7} | 6
5 | (Portugal) Nuno Borges | 6^{3} | 0

Final
6 | (Chinese Taipei) Tseng Chun-hsin | 6 | 3 | 2
8 | (France) Geoffrey Blancaneaux | 3 | 6 | 6

=== Top half ===
First round
1 | (Slovakia) A Martin | 6 | 6
(Spain) C Sánchez Jover | 3 | 0
Q | (Italy) Lorenzo Bocchi | 4 | 6 | 6^{3}
PR | (Morocco) E Benchetrit | 6 | 0 | 7^{7}
(Germany) L Wessels | 7 | 3 | 6
Q | (Italy) Simone Roncalli | 5 | 6 | 3
(Spain) O Roca Batalla | 6 | 6
7 | (Canada) S Diez | 4 | 1
4 | (Portugal) J Domingues | 2 | 7^{7} | 6
(France) Matthieu Perchicot | 6 | 6^{2} | 1
WC | (Portugal) Pedro Araújo | 3 | 1
(France) C Hemery | 6 | 6
WC | (Portugal) D Vale | 7^{7} | 3 | 2
(Romania) ND Ionel | 6^{1} | 6 | 6
Q | (Germany) Oscar Moraing | 4 | 1
6 | (Chinese Taipei) C-h Tseng | 6 | 6

Second round
1 | (Slovakia) A Martin | 6 | 7^{7}
PR | (Morocco) E Benchetrit | 2 | 6^{0}
(Germany) L Wessels | 3 | 6 | 6
(Spain) O Roca Batalla | 6 | 2 | 2
4 | (Portugal) J Domingues | 3 | 7^{7} | 3
(France) C Hemery | 6 | 6^{5} | 6
(Romania) ND Ionel | 3 | 4
6 | (Chinese Taipei) C-h Tseng | 6 | 6

Quarterfinals
1 | (Slovakia) A Martin | 6 | 5 | 6
(Germany) L Wessels | 2 | 7 | 4
(France) C Hemery | 4 | 1
6 | (Chinese Taipei) C-h Tseng | 6 | 6

Semifinals
1 | (Slovakia) A Martin | 4 | 5
6 | (Chinese Taipei) C-h Tseng | 6 | 7

=== Bottom half ===
First round
8 | (France) G Blancaneaux | 6 | 3 | 6
(Spain) N Sánchez Izquierdo | 3 | 6 | 2
(Portugal) G Oliveira | 6 | 6
(France) M Hamou | 2 | 2
WC | (Portugal) T Cação | 2 | 6 | 6
(Austria) D Pichler | 6 | 1 | 4
(Spain) Eduard Esteve Lobato | 4 | 2
3 | (Portugal) G Elias | 6 | 6
5 | (Portugal) N Borges | 1 | 6 | 6
(Germany) Elmar Ejupovic | 6 | 3 | 4
(Tunisia) A Dougaz | 6 | 6
(Russia) I Gakhov | 1 | 4
PR | (Belgium) J Cagnina | 6 | 6^{5} | 4
Q | (Spain) M Damas | 0 | 7^{7} | 6
(United Kingdom) P Jubb | 1 | 1
2 | (Belgium) K Coppejans | 6 | 6

Second round
8 | (France) G Blancaneaux | 2 | 6 | 6
(Portugal) G Oliveira | 6 | 3 | 4
WC | (Portugal) T Cação | 2 | 6 | 3
3 | (Portugal) G Elias | 6 | 2 | 6
5 | (Portugal) N Borges | 7 | 6
(Tunisia) A Dougaz | 5 | 1
Q | (Spain) M Damas | 2 | 1
2 | (Belgium) K Coppejans | 6 | 6

Quarterfinals
8 | (France) G Blancaneaux | w/o
3 | (Portugal) G Elias
5 | (Portugal) N Borges | 6 | 7^{7}
2 | (Belgium) K Coppejans | 4 | 6^{4}

Semifinals
8 | (France) G Blancaneaux | 7^{7} | 6
5 | (Portugal) N Borges | 6^{3} | 0
