= 2022 Maia Challenger – Singles =

Singles
- 2022 Maia Challenger

Final
- Champion: (France) Luca Van Assche
- Runner-up: (Austria) Maximilian Neuchrist
- Score: 3–6, 6–4, 6–0

Events
Singles	Doubles
- Maia Challenger

Tseng Chun-hsin was the defending champion but chose not to defend his title.

Luca Van Assche won the title after defeating Maximilian Neuchrist 3–6, 6–4, 6–0 in the final.

== Seeds ==
1. (Portugal) Nuno Borges (semifinals)
2. (Austria) Jurij Rodionov (quarterfinals)
3. (Sweden) Elias Ymer (first round)
4. (France) Geoffrey Blancaneaux (first round)
5. (Australia) Aleksandar Vukic (semifinals)
6. (Kazakhstan) Timofey Skatov (second round)
7. (Italy) Luciano Darderi (first round)
8. (Italy) Riccardo Bonadio (quarterfinals)

== Draw ==
Key

- Q = Qualifier
- WC = Wild card
- LL = Lucky loser
- Alt = Alternate
- ITF = ITF entry
- PR = Protected ranking
- SR = Special ranking
- SE = Special exempt
- JE = Junior exempt
- JR = Junior Accelerator Programme entrant
- CO = College Accelerator Programme entrant
- NG = Next Gen Accelerator Program entrant
- w/o = Walkover
- r = Retired
- d = Defaulted

=== Finals ===
Semifinals
1	(Portugal) Nuno Borges	7	3	6^{1}
Q	(Austria) Maximilian Neuchrist	5	6	7^{7}
(France) Luca Van Assche	1	6	6
5	(Australia) Aleksandar Vukic	6	2	3

Final
Q	(Austria) Maximilian Neuchrist	6	4	0
(France) Luca Van Assche	3	6	6

=== Top half ===
First round
1	(Portugal) N Borges	6	6
Q	(Uzbekistan) D Istomin	3	0
(Ukraine) O Krutykh	4	4
PR	(Portugal) P Sousa	6	6
WC	(Portugal) Fábio Coelho	3	0
Q	(Belgium) R Collignon	6	6
(Spain) N Álvarez Varona	4	6	6^{7}
8	(Italy) R Bonadio	6	2	7^{9}
4	(France) G Blancaneaux	1	4
(Bosnia and Herzegovina) N Fatić	6	6
Alt	(Ukraine) V Sachko	0	4
(United Kingdom) J Choinski	6	6
WC	(Portugal) J Domingues	2	5
Q	(Austria) M Neuchrist	6	7
(Romania) ND Ionel	6	6^{3}	5
6	(Kazakhstan) T Skatov	3	7^{7}	7

Second round
1	(Portugal) N Borges	2
PR	(Portugal) P Sousa	4^{r}
Q	(Belgium) R Collignon	5	5
8	(Italy) R Bonadio	7	7
(Bosnia and Herzegovina) N Fatić	3	2^{r}
(United Kingdom) J Choinski	6	4
Q	(Austria) M Neuchrist	7^{7}	6^{4}	7^{7}
6	(Kazakhstan) T Skatov	6^{3}	7^{7}	6^{3}

Quarterfinals
1	(Portugal) N Borges	7	6
8	(Italy) R Bonadio	5	4
(United Kingdom) J Choinski	7^{8}	3	4
Q	(Austria) M Neuchrist	6^{6}	6	6

Semifinals
1	(Portugal) N Borges	7	3	6^{1}
Q	(Austria) M Neuchrist	5	6	7^{7}

=== Bottom half ===
First round
7	(Italy) L Darderi	3	4
I Gakhov	6	6
(Argentina) A Collarini	5	7^{7}	6
A Vatutin	7	6^{4}	3
Q	(Bulgaria) A Lazarov	6	6
(Italy) A Giannessi	3	4
(France) L Van Assche	6	6
3	(Sweden) E Ymer	2	1
5	(Australia) A Vukic	6	6^{4}	6
Alt	(Germany) L Wessels	2	7^{7}	1
Q	(Belgium) G Onclin	2	0
Q	E Karlovskiy	6	6
WC	(Portugal) G Oliveira	5	6	6
(Serbia) N Milojević	7	3	0
(Czech Republic) Z Kolář	4	3
2	(Austria) J Rodionov	6	6

Second round
I Gakhov	4	7	0
(Argentina) A Collarini	6	5	0^{r}
Q	(Bulgaria) A Lazarov	3	4
(France) L Van Assche	6	6
5	(Australia) A Vukic	6	6
Q	E Karlovskiy	3	1
WC	(Portugal) G Oliveira	6	2	6^{1}
2	(Austria) J Rodionov	3	6	7^{7}

Quarterfinals
I Gakhov	1	2
(France) L Van Assche	6	6
5	(Australia) A Vukic	4	6	7
2	(Austria) J Rodionov	6	3	5

Semifinals
(France) L Van Assche	1	6	6
5	(Australia) A Vukic	6	2	3
