= 2023 Maia Challenger – Singles =

Singles
- 2023 Maia Challenger

Final
- Champion: (Portugal) Nuno Borges
- Runner-up: (France) Benoît Paire
- Score: 6–1, 6–4

Events
Singles	Doubles
- Maia Challenger

Luca Van Assche was the defending champion but chose not to defend his title.

Nuno Borges won the title after defeating Benoît Paire 6–1, 6–4 in the final.

== Seeds ==
1. (Portugal) Nuno Borges (champion)
2. (Spain) Albert Ramos Viñolas (quarterfinals)
3. (France) Benoît Paire (final)
4. (Italy) Fabio Fognini (second round, withdrew)
5. (Sweden) Elias Ymer (quarterfinals)
6. (Italy) Andrea Vavassori (quarterfinals)
7. (France) Calvin Hemery (first round)
8. (Italy) Riccardo Bonadio (first round)

== Draw ==
Key

- Q = Qualifier
- WC = Wild card
- LL = Lucky loser
- Alt = Alternate
- ITF = ITF entry
- PR = Protected ranking
- SR = Special ranking
- SE = Special exempt
- JE = Junior exempt
- JR = Junior Accelerator Programme entrant
- CO = College Accelerator Programme entrant
- NG = Next Gen Accelerator Program entrant
- w/o = Walkover
- r = Retired
- d = Defaulted

=== Finals ===
Semifinals
1	(Portugal) Nuno Borges	7^{7}	6
(France) Matteo Martineau	6^{5}	4
3	(France) Benoît Paire	6	7
(France) Maxime Janvier	2	5

Final
1	(Portugal) Nuno Borges	6	6
3	(France) Benoît Paire	1	4

=== Top half ===
First round
1	(Portugal) N Borges	6	7^{7}
(Egypt) M Safwat	4	6^{5}
(Belgium) M Geerts	6^{3}	6	1
(Italy) E Dalla Valle	7^{7}	4	6
(Germany) S Fanselow	6	3	4
Q	(Sweden) K Friberg	3	6	6
Q	A Vatutin	1	6^{6}
6	(Italy) A Vavassori	6	7^{8}
4	(Italy) F Fognini	6^{7}	6	7
Q	(Germany) T Gentzsch	7^{9}	3	5
(France) M Martineau	6	6
LL	(Spain) M Damas	1	2
(Italy) A Giannessi	4	7^{7}	2
(Portugal) H Rocha	6	6^{5}	6
Q	(United Kingdom) A Matusevich	4	6	6
7	(France) C Hemery	6	3	3

Second round
1	(Portugal) N Borges	6	6
(Italy) E Dalla Valle	2	0
Q	(Sweden) K Friberg	2	3
6	(Italy) A Vavassori	6	6
4	(Italy) F Fognini
(France) M Martineau	w/o
(Portugal) H Rocha	6^{2}	4
Q	(United Kingdom) A Matusevich	7^{7}	6

Quarterfinals
1	(Portugal) N Borges	2	7^{8}	6
6	(Italy) A Vavassori	6	6^{6}	3
(France) M Martineau	6	6
Q	(United Kingdom) A Matusevich	2	2

Semifinals
1	(Portugal) N Borges	7^{7}	6
(France) M Martineau	6^{5}	4

=== Bottom half ===
First round
5	(Sweden) E Ymer	6^{3}	6	6
(Argentina) M Trungelliti	7^{7}	2	4
(Kazakhstan) D Yevseyev	6	7^{7}
LL	(Greece) S Sakellaridis	2	6^{5}
Q	(Portugal) Pedro Araújo	2	3
WC	(Portugal) J Faria	6	6
WC	(Portugal) D Vale	2	4
3	(France) B Paire	6	6
8	(Italy) R Bonadio	3	3
WC	(Portugal) Francisco Rocha	6	6
Q	(Italy) A Guerrieri	3	2
(France) M Janvier	6	6
(Portugal) J Sousa	6	3	6
(Romania) FC Jianu	3	6	1
(Slovakia) J Kovalík	4	3
2	(Spain) A Ramos Viñolas	6	6

Second round
5	(Sweden) E Ymer	6	6^{7}	6
(Kazakhstan) D Yevseyev	4	7^{9}	3
WC	(Portugal) J Faria	7^{9}	3	3
3	(France) B Paire	6^{7}	6	6
WC	(Portugal) F Rocha	4	2
(France) M Janvier	6	6
(Portugal) J Sousa	4	6^{3}
2	(Spain) A Ramos Viñolas	6	7^{7}

Quarterfinals
5	(Sweden) E Ymer	6	3	3
3	(France) B Paire	3	6	6
(France) M Janvier	6	6
2	(Spain) A Ramos Viñolas	2	4

Semifinals
3	(France) B Paire	6	7
(France) M Janvier	2	5
