= 2025 Maia Challenger – Singles =

Singles
- 2025 Maia Challenger

Final
- Champion: (Denmark) Elmer Møller
- Runner-up: (Slovakia) Andrej Martin
- Score: 6–4, 6–1

Events
Singles	Doubles
- Maia Challenger

Damir Džumhur was the defending champion but chose not to defend his title.

Elmer Møller won the title after defeating Andrej Martin 6–4, 6–1 in the final.

== Seeds ==
1. (United Kingdom) Jan Choinski (quarterfinals)
2. (Portugal) Jaime Faria (first round)
3. (Denmark) Elmer Møller (champion)
4. (Portugal) Henrique Rocha (second round)
5. (Spain) Daniel Mérida (semifinals)
6. (Austria) Lukas Neumayer (withdrew)
7. (Italy) Lorenzo Giustino (second round, retired)
8. (Czech Republic) Zdeněk Kolář (first round)

== Draw ==
Key

- Q = Qualifier
- WC = Wild card
- LL = Lucky loser
- Alt = Alternate
- ITF = ITF entry
- PR = Protected ranking
- SR = Special ranking
- SE = Special exempt
- JE = Junior exempt
- JR = Junior Accelerator Programme entrant
- CO = College Accelerator Programme entrant
- NG = Next Gen Accelerator Program entrant
- w/o = Walkover
- r = Retired
- d = Defaulted

=== Finals ===
Semifinals
5	(Spain) Daniel Mérida	3	4
3	(Denmark) Elmer Møller	6	6
Q	(Slovakia) Andrej Martin	3	6	6
Q	(France) Lilian Marmousez	6	3	2

Final
3	(Denmark) Elmer Møller	6	6
Q	(Slovakia) Andrej Martin	4	1

=== Top half ===
First round
1	(United Kingdom) J Choinski	6	7^{7}
(Switzerland) K Feldbausch	1	6^{5}
NG	(Italy) F Bondioli	6	3	5
(Portugal) F Ferreira Silva	3	6	7
Q	(Spain) A Santamarta Roig	6	6
WC	(Portugal) Francisco Rocha	4	4
SE	(Italy) G Cadenasso	4	4
5	(Spain) D Mérida	6	6
3	(Denmark) E Møller	6	6
WC	(Portugal) Pedro Araújo	4	4
(Poland) D Michalski	3	6	6
Q	(Spain) Tomás Currás Abasolo	6	4	4
(France) G Blancaneaux	6	6
PR	(Italy) S Napolitano	2	1
(Portugal) T Pereira	3	2
Q	(Spain) Carlos López Montagud	6	6

Second round
1	(United Kingdom) J Choinski	6	4	7
(Portugal) F Ferreira Silva	2	6	5
Q	(Spain) A Santamarta Roig	3	4
5	(Spain) D Mérida	6	6
3	(Denmark) E Møller	2	6	7^{8}
(Poland) D Michalski	6	4	6^{6}
(France) G Blancaneaux	6	3	2
Q	(Spain) C López Montagud	1	6	6

Quarterfinals
1	(United Kingdom) J Choinski	3	5
5	(Spain) D Mérida	6	7
3	(Denmark) E Møller	7	6
Q	(Spain) C López Montagud	5	4

Semifinals
5	(Spain) D Mérida	3	4
3	(Denmark) E Møller	6	6

=== Bottom half ===
First round
7	(Italy) L Giustino	7	6
LL	(Romania) C Crețu	5	4
I Gakhov	6	4	4
Q	(Slovakia) A Martin	3	6	6
LL	A Vatutin	2	6	7
(Italy) F Agamenone	6	1	5
WC	(Portugal) G Elias	7	3	1
4	(Portugal) H Rocha	5	6	6
8	(Czech Republic) Z Kolář	7^{7}	3	2
(Spain) M Damas	6^{5}	6	6
PR	(Bulgaria) A Andreev	4	7^{7}	2
Q	(France) Lilian Marmousez	6	6^{0}	6
(Spain) N Sánchez Izquierdo	4	1
Q	(Spain) C Sánchez Jover	6	6
(Romania) FC Jianu	7	6
2	(Portugal) J Faria	5	3

Second round
7	(Italy) L Giustino	4	4^{r}
Q	(Slovakia) A Martin	6	3
LL	A Vatutin	7^{7}	6
4	(Portugal) H Rocha	6^{2}	2
(Spain) M Damas	5	6^{2}
Q	(France) L Marmousez	7	7^{7}
Q	(Spain) C Sánchez Jover	3	7	2
(Romania) FC Jianu	6	5	6

Quarterfinals
Q	(Slovakia) A Martin	6	7
LL	A Vatutin	1	5
Q	(France) L Marmousez	6	6
(Romania) FC Jianu	2	3

Semifinals
Q	(Slovakia) A Martin	3	6	6
Q	(France) L Marmousez	6	3	2
