= 2021 Maia Challenger – Doubles =

Doubles
- 2021 Maia Challenger

Final
- Champions: (Portugal) Nuno Borges (Portugal) Francisco Cabral
- Runners-up: (Slovakia) Andrej Martin (Portugal) Gonçalo Oliveira
- Score: 6–3, 6–4

Events
Singles	Doubles
- Maia Challenger

Zdeněk Kolář and Andrea Vavassori were the defending champions but chose not to defend their title.

Nuno Borges and Francisco Cabral won the title after defeating Andrej Martin and Gonçalo Oliveira 6–3, 6–4 in the final.

== Seeds ==
1. (Slovakia) Andrej Martin / (Portugal) Gonçalo Oliveira (final)
2. (Portugal) Nuno Borges / (Portugal) Francisco Cabral (champions)
3. (Belgium) Kimmer Coppejans / (Netherlands) Mats Hermans (quarterfinals)
4. (Russia) Ivan Gakhov / (Austria) David Pichler (quarterfinals)

== Draw ==
Key

- Q = Qualifier
- WC = Wild card
- LL = Lucky loser
- Alt = Alternate
- ITF = ITF entry
- PR = Protected ranking
- SR = Special ranking
- SE = Special exempt
- JE = Junior exempt
- JR = Junior Accelerator Programme entrant
- CO = College Accelerator Programme entrant
- NG = Next Gen Accelerator Program entrant
- w/o = Walkover
- r = Retired
- d = Defaulted

First round
1	(Slovakia) A Martin (Portugal) G Oliveira	w/o
(Canada) S Diez (Spain) N Sánchez Izquierdo
(Germany) Elmar Ejupovic (Germany) L Wessels	6^{6}	7^{9}	[6]
(Spain) Eduard Esteve Lobato (Spain) O Roca Batalla	7^{8}	6^{7}	[10]
3	(Belgium) K Coppejans (Netherlands) M Hermans	7^{7}	6
WC	(Portugal) Miguel Gomes (Portugal) Francisco Rocha	6^{4}	0
(Italy) Lorenzo Bocchi (Spain) M Damas	6	6^{5}	[11]
(Portugal) Gonçalo Falcão (Portugal) D Vale	4	7^{7}	[9]
(Romania) ND Ionel (Germany) Oscar Moraing	1	2
(France) G Blancaneaux (France) C Hemery	6	6
(Portugal) T Cação (Portugal) Fábio Coelho	6^{6}	6	[4]
4	(Russia) I Gakhov (Austria) D Pichler	7^{8}	2	[10]
WC	(Portugal) Henrique Petiz (Portugal) Tiago Silva	5	3
(Tunisia) A Dougaz (Chinese Taipei) C-h Tseng	7	6
WC	(Portugal) J Faria (Portugal) Luís Faria	3	4
2	(Portugal) N Borges (Portugal) F Cabral	6	6

Quarterfinals
1	(Slovakia) A Martin (Portugal) G Oliveira	6	6
(Spain) E Esteve Lobato (Spain) O Roca Batalla	2	4
3	(Belgium) K Coppejans (Netherlands) M Hermans	4	7^{7}	[2]
(Italy) L Bocchi (Spain) M Damas	6	6^{3}	[10]
(France) G Blancaneaux (France) C Hemery	6	7^{7}
4	(Russia) I Gakhov (Austria) D Pichler	3	6^{3}
(Tunisia) A Dougaz (Chinese Taipei) C-h Tseng	3	4
2	(Portugal) N Borges (Portugal) F Cabral	6	6

Semifinals
1	(Slovakia) A Martin (Portugal) G Oliveira	6	6
(Italy) L Bocchi (Spain) M Damas	4	3
(France) G Blancaneaux (France) C Hemery	1	3
2	(Portugal) N Borges (Portugal) F Cabral	6	6

Final
1	(Slovakia) A Martin (Portugal) G Oliveira	3	4
2	(Portugal) N Borges (Portugal) F Cabral	6	6
