= 2020 Maia Challenger – Doubles =

Doubles
- 2020 Maia Challenger

Final
- Champions: (Czech Republic) Zdeněk Kolář (Italy) Andrea Vavassori
- Runners-up: (United Kingdom) Lloyd Glasspool (Finland) Harri Heliövaara
- Score: 6–3, 6–4

Events
Singles	Doubles
- Maia Challenger

Andre Begemann and Daniel Masur were the defending champions but chose to defend their title with different partners. Begemann partnered Albano Olivetti but lost in the semifinals to Lloyd Glasspool and Harri Heliövaara. Masur partnered Julian Lenz but lost in the semifinals to Zdeněk Kolář and Andrea Vavassori.

Kolář and Vavassori won the title after defeating Glasspool and Heliövaara 6–3, 6–4 in the final.

== Seeds ==
1. (Portugal) Gonçalo Oliveira / (Spain) David Vega Hernández (first round)
2. (Germany) Andre Begemann / (France) Albano Olivetti (semifinals)
3. (Czech Republic) Zdeněk Kolář / (Italy) Andrea Vavassori (champions)
4. (United Kingdom) Lloyd Glasspool / (Finland) Harri Heliövaara (final)

== Draw ==
Key

- Q = Qualifier
- WC = Wild card
- LL = Lucky loser
- Alt = Alternate
- ITF = ITF entry
- PR = Protected ranking
- SR = Special ranking
- SE = Special exempt
- JE = Junior exempt
- JR = Junior Accelerator Programme entrant
- CO = College Accelerator Programme entrant
- NG = Next Gen Accelerator Program entrant
- w/o = Walkover
- r = Retired
- d = Defaulted

First round
1	(Portugal) G Oliveira (Spain) D Vega Hernández	4	4
(Belgium) K Coppejans (Spain) S Martos Gornés	6	6
3	(Czech Republic) Z Kolář (Italy) A Vavassori	6	7
WC	(Portugal) N Borges (Portugal) F Cabral	4	5
WC	(Portugal) Gonçalo Falcão (Portugal) P Sousa	6	6
WC	(Portugal) T Cação (Portugal) Luís Faria	1	2
(Spain) C Taberner (Spain) B Zapata Miralles	1	3
4	(United Kingdom) L Glasspool (Finland) H Heliövaara	6	6
Alt	(France) G Blancaneaux (Croatia) N Serdarušić	7^{9}	2	[11]
(United States) M Cressy (France) A Rinderknech	6^{7}	6	[9]
(France) Q Halys (France) T Lamasine	3	6^{3}
2	(Germany) A Begemann (France) A Olivetti	6	7^{7}

Quarterfinals
(Belgium) K Coppejans (Spain) S Martos Gornés	2	3
(Germany) J Lenz (Germany) D Masur	6	6
3	(Czech Republic) Z Kolář (Italy) A Vavassori	6	6
(Russia) P Kotov (Russia) A Vatutin	2	2
WC	(Portugal) G Falcão (Portugal) P Sousa	3	2
4	(United Kingdom) L Glasspool (Finland) H Heliövaara	6	6
Alt	(France) G Blancaneaux (Croatia) N Serdarušić	5	4
2	(Germany) A Begemann (France) A Olivetti	7	6

Semifinals
(Germany) J Lenz (Germany) D Masur	6	2	[5]
3	(Czech Republic) Z Kolář (Italy) A Vavassori	2	6	[10]
4	(United Kingdom) L Glasspool (Finland) H Heliövaara	6	6
2	(Germany) A Begemann (France) A Olivetti	3	4

Final
3	(Czech Republic) Z Kolář (Italy) A Vavassori	6	6
4	(United Kingdom) L Glasspool (Finland) H Heliövaara	3	4
