= 2021 Maia Challenger II – Singles =

Singles
- 2021 Maia Challenger II

Final
- Champion: (Chinese Taipei) Tseng Chun-hsin
- Runner-up: (Portugal) Nuno Borges
- Score: 5–7, 7–5, 6–2

Events
Singles	Doubles
- Maia Challenger

Geoffrey Blancaneaux was the defending champion but chose not to defend his title.

Tseng Chun-hsin won the title after defeating Nuno Borges 5–7, 7–5, 6–2 in the final.

== Seeds ==
1. (Slovakia) Andrej Martin (semifinals)
2. (Belgium) Kimmer Coppejans (second round)
3. (France) Maxime Janvier (first round)
4. (Portugal) Gastão Elias (second round)
5. (Portugal) Nuno Borges (final)
6. (Portugal) João Domingues (first round)
7. (Chinese Taipei) Tseng Chun-hsin (champion)
8. (Portugal) Gonçalo Oliveira (second round)

== Draw ==
Key

- Q = Qualifier
- WC = Wild card
- LL = Lucky loser
- Alt = Alternate
- ITF = ITF entry
- PR = Protected ranking
- SR = Special ranking
- SE = Special exempt
- JE = Junior exempt
- JR = Junior Accelerator Programme entrant
- CO = College Accelerator Programme entrant
- NG = Next Gen Accelerator Program entrant
- w/o = Walkover
- r = Retired
- d = Defaulted

=== Finals ===
Semifinals
1	(Slovakia) Andrej Martin	1	2
7	(Chinese Taipei) Tseng Chun-hsin	6	6
5	(Portugal) Nuno Borges	6	6
Alt	(Morocco) Elliot Benchetrit	2	2

Final
7	(Chinese Taipei) Tseng Chun-hsin	5	7	6
5	(Portugal) Nuno Borges	7	5	2

=== Top half ===
First round
1	(Slovakia) A Martin	7^{7}	6^{5}	7
Q	(Switzerland) D Wenger	6^{1}	7^{7}	5
(Germany) L Wessels	4	6	6^{5}
Q	(Italy) Luca Potenza	6	2	7^{7}
(Germany) S Fanselow	6	3	6
WC	(Portugal) Fábio Coelho	3	6	3
(Austria) G Melzer	6	4	6^{3}
8	(Portugal) G Oliveira	4	6	7^{7}
3	(France) M Janvier	6^{5}	2
(Romania) FC Jianu	7^{7}	6
(Spain) Eduard Esteve Lobato	6	6
SE	(Ukraine) O Prihodko	3	2
(Austria) A Erler	1	2
(Hungary) F Marozsán	6	6
(Italy) M Viola	3	4
7	(Chinese Taipei) C-h Tseng	6	6

Second round
1	(Slovakia) A Martin	w/o
Q	(Italy) L Potenza
(Germany) S Fanselow	7^{7}	6
8	(Portugal) G Oliveira	6^{3}	4
(Romania) FC Jianu	7	3	4
(Spain) E Esteve Lobato	5	6	6
(Hungary) F Marozsán	6^{4}	3
7	(Chinese Taipei) C-h Tseng	7^{7}	6

Quarterfinals
1	(Slovakia) A Martin	6	6
(Germany) S Fanselow	2	2
(Spain) E Esteve Lobato	1	5
7	(Chinese Taipei) C-h Tseng	6	7

Semifinals
1	(Slovakia) A Martin	1	2
7	(Chinese Taipei) C-h Tseng	6	6

=== Bottom half ===
First round
5	(Portugal) N Borges	7^{10}	6
(Italy) R Bonadio	6^{8}	2
Q	(Italy) Edoardo Lavagno	6	2	7^{8}
WC	(Portugal) T Cação	1	6	6^{6}
(Spain) J Barranco Cosano	4	6	4
(Spain) N Sánchez Izquierdo	6	4	6
Alt	(Ukraine) O Krutykh	6	2	5
4	(Portugal) G Elias	4	6	7
6	(Portugal) J Domingues	3	7	3
(Dominican Republic) N Hardt	6	5	6
(France) Alexis Gautier	2	2
Alt	(Morocco) E Benchetrit	6	6
Q	(Germany) Elmar Ejupovic	6	6
Alt	(Spain) O Roca Batalla	4	4
WC	(Portugal) Pedro Araújo	4	6	3
2	(Belgium) K Coppejans	6	4	6

Second round
5	(Portugal) N Borges	6	6
Q	(Italy) E Lavagno	3	2
(Spain) N Sánchez Izquierdo	6	6^{5}	6
4	(Portugal) G Elias	1	7^{7}	3
(Dominican Republic) N Hardt	3	4
Alt	(Morocco) E Benchetrit	6	6
Q	(Germany) E Ejupovic	6	6
2	(Belgium) K Coppejans	4	4

Quarterfinals
5	(Portugal) N Borges	6	6
(Spain) N Sánchez Izquierdo	4	4
Alt	(Morocco) E Benchetrit	5	6	6
Q	(Germany) E Ejupovic	7	1	4

Semifinals
5	(Portugal) N Borges	6	6
Alt	(Morocco) E Benchetrit	2	2
