= 2019 Maia Challenger =

- Date: 18–24 November
- Edition: 1st
- Draw: 48S / 16D
- Surface: Clay
- Location: Maia, Portugal

Champions

Singles
- (Slovakia) Jozef Kovalík

Doubles
- (Germany) Andre Begemann / (Germany) Daniel Masur
- Maia Challenger

The 2019 Maia Open was a professional tennis tournament played on clay courts. It was the first edition of the tournament which was part of the 2019 ATP Challenger Tour. It took place in Maia, Portugal from 18 to 24 November 2019.

== Singles main-draw entrants ==
=== Seeds ===
Country	Player	Rank^{1}	Seed
SVK	Andrej Martin	110	1
ITA	Thomas Fabbiano	117	2
ITA	Paolo Lorenzi	118	3
ITA	Gianluca Mager	119	4
HUN	Attila Balázs	135	5
~~CAN~~	~~Steven Diez~~	~~136~~	~~6~~
ESP	Guillermo García López	145	7
POR	Pedro Sousa	146	8
SRB	Nikola Milojević	160	9
SVK	Jozef Kovalík	167	10
~~POR~~	~~Frederico Ferreira Silva~~	~~174~~	~~11~~
USA	Maxime Cressy	179	12
ITA	Roberto Marcora	183	13
POR	João Domingues	185	14
EGY	Mohamed Safwat	203	15
ITA	Filippo Baldi	211	16

- ^{1} Rankings are as of 11 November 2019.

=== Other entrants ===
The following players received wildcards into the singles main draw:

- (Portugal) Nuno Borges
- (Portugal) Francisco Cabral
- (Portugal) Tiago Cação
- (Portugal) Luís Faria
- (Portugal) João Monteiro

The following players received entry into the singles main draw using protected rankings:

- (Spain) Íñigo Cervantes
- (Spain) Carlos Gómez-Herrera
- (Spain) Javier Martí
- (Austria) Maximilian Neuchrist

The following player received entry into the singles main draw as an alternate:

- (Italy) Riccardo Bonadio

The following players received entry from the qualifying draw:

- (Italy) Fabrizio Ornago
- (Italy) Andrea Vavassori

The following players received entry as lucky losers:

- (Portugal) Fábio Coelho
- (France) Maxime Hamou

== Champions ==
=== Singles ===
- (Slovakia) Jozef Kovalík def. (France) Constant Lestienne 6–0, 6–4.

=== Doubles ===
- (Germany) Andre Begemann / (Germany) Daniel Masur def. (Spain) Guillermo García López / (Spain) David Vega Hernández 7–6^{(7–2)}, 6–4.
