= 2020 Maia Challenger – Singles =

Singles
- 2020 Maia Challenger

Final
- Champion: (Portugal) Pedro Sousa
- Runner-up: (Spain) Carlos Taberner
- Score: 6–0, 5–7, 6–2

Events
Singles	Doubles
- Maia Challenger

Jozef Kovalík was the defending champion but lost in the quarterfinals to Carlos Taberner.

Pedro Sousa won the title after defeating Taberner 6–0, 5–7, 6–2 in the final.

== Seeds ==
1. (Spain) Pedro Martínez (first round)
2. (Portugal) Pedro Sousa (champion)
3. (Slovakia) Jozef Kovalík (quarterfinals)
4. (Switzerland) Henri Laaksonen (quarterfinals)
5. (Serbia) Nikola Milojević (first round)
6. (Italy) Paolo Lorenzi (second round)
7. (Italy) Lorenzo Giustino (first round)
8. (Spain) Carlos Taberner (final)

== Draw ==
Key

- Q = Qualifier
- WC = Wild card
- LL = Lucky loser
- Alt = Alternate
- ITF = ITF entry
- PR = Protected ranking
- SR = Special ranking
- SE = Special exempt
- JE = Junior exempt
- JR = Junior Accelerator Programme entrant
- CO = College Accelerator Programme entrant
- NG = Next Gen Accelerator Program entrant
- w/o = Walkover
- r = Retired
- d = Defaulted

=== Finals ===
Semifinals
Q	(Croatia) Duje Ajduković	5	7^{11}	4
8	(Spain) Carlos Taberner	7	6^{9}	6
(Spain) Bernabé Zapata Miralles	4	1
2	(Portugal) Pedro Sousa	6	6

Final
8	(Spain) Carlos Taberner	0	7	2
2	(Portugal) Pedro Sousa	6	5	6

=== Top half ===
First round
1	(Spain) P Martínez	1	2
(Italy) A Arnaboldi	6	6
(France) H Grenier	3	2
(Portugal) F Ferreira Silva	6	6
(France) T Lamasine	3	6	2
(France) A Rinderknech	6	3	6
Q	(Croatia) D Ajduković	7	6
7	(Italy) L Giustino	5	2
3	(Slovakia) J Kovalík	6	4	6
(Germany) J Lenz	1	6	2
Q	(Turkey) A Çelikbilek	2	7	7^{7}
WC	(Portugal) G Oliveira	6	5	6^{3}
(Russia) A Vatutin	6	6
(France) C Lestienne	2	0
(Portugal) J Domingues	3	2
8	(Spain) C Taberner	6	6

Second round
(Italy) A Arnaboldi	2	6	7
(Portugal) F Ferreira Silva	6	4	5
(France) A Rinderknech	2	6	1
Q	(Croatia) D Ajduković	6	2	6
3	(Slovakia) J Kovalík	6	3	6
Q	(Turkey) A Çelikbilek	3	6	3
(Russia) A Vatutin	6^{6}	3
8	(Spain) C Taberner	7^{8}	6

Quarterfinals
(Italy) A Arnaboldi	3	0
Q	(Croatia) D Ajduković	6	6
3	(Slovakia) J Kovalík	6^{3}	1
8	(Spain) C Taberner	7^{7}	6

Semifinals
Q	(Croatia) D Ajduković	5	7^{11}	4
8	(Spain) C Taberner	7	6^{9}	6

=== Bottom half ===
First round
6	(Italy) P Lorenzi	5	7^{9}	6
Q	(Czech Republic) M Vrbenský	7	6^{7}	2
WC	(Portugal) N Borges	5	1
(Spain) B Zapata Miralles	7	6
(France) Q Halys	7	3	7
Alt	(France) G Blancaneaux	5	6	5
(Czech Republic) Z Kolář	4	3
4	(Switzerland) H Laaksonen	6	6
5	(Serbia) N Milojević	3	1
(Argentina) M Trungelliti	6	6
(Germany) D Masur	2	5
(Belgium) K Coppejans	6	7
WC	(Portugal) G Elias	6	7
(Russia) P Kotov	2	5
Q	(France) M Hamou	2	2
2	(Portugal) P Sousa	6	6

Second round
6	(Italy) P Lorenzi	1	0
(Spain) B Zapata Miralles	6	6
(France) Q Halys	3	1
4	(Switzerland) H Laaksonen	6	6
(Argentina) M Trungelliti
(Belgium) K Coppejans	w/o
WC	(Portugal) G Elias	2	4
2	(Portugal) P Sousa	6	6

Quarterfinals
(Spain) B Zapata Miralles	6	3	6
4	(Switzerland) H Laaksonen	2	6	4
(Belgium) K Coppejans	2	6	1
2	(Portugal) P Sousa	6	3	6

Semifinals
(Spain) B Zapata Miralles	4	1
2	(Portugal) P Sousa	6	6
