= 2022 I.ČLTK Prague Open – Men's singles =

Men's singles
- 2022 I.ČLTK Prague Open

Final
- Champion: (Argentina) Pedro Cachin
- Runner-up: (Italy) Lorenzo Giustino
- Score: 6–3, 7–6^{(7–4)}

Events
| Singles | men | women |
| Doubles | men | women |
- I.ČLTK Prague Open

The men's singles of the 2022 I.ČLTK Prague Open tournament took place on clay in Prague, Czech Republic.

Tallon Griekspoor was the defending champion but chose not to compete.

Pedro Cachin won the title after defeating Lorenzo Giustino 6–3, 7–6^{(7–4)} in the final.

== Seeds ==
1. (Australia) Aleksandar Vukic (first round)
2. (Portugal) Nuno Borges (second round)
3. (Czech Republic) Tomáš Macháč (withdrew)
4. (Czech Republic) Vít Kopřiva (second round)
5. (Argentina) Pedro Cachin (champion)
6. (Netherlands) Jesper de Jong (first round)
7. (Argentina) Juan Pablo Ficovich (first round)
8. (Italy) Federico Gaio (quarterfinals)

== Draw ==
Key

- Q = Qualifier
- WC = Wild card
- LL = Lucky loser
- Alt = Alternate
- ITF = ITF entry
- PR = Protected ranking
- SR = Special ranking
- SE = Special exempt
- JE = Junior exempt
- JR = Junior Accelerator Programme entrant
- CO = College Accelerator Programme entrant
- NG = Next Gen Accelerator Program entrant
- w/o = Walkover
- r = Retired
- d = Defaulted

=== Finals ===
Semifinals
5 | (Argentina) Pedro Cachin | 2 | 6 | 6
(France) Geoffrey Blancaneaux | 6 | 2 | 3
(Italy) Lorenzo Giustino | 7^{7} | 4 | 6
(Bulgaria) Dimitar Kuzmanov | 6^{4} | 6 | 2

Final
5 | (Argentina) Pedro Cachin | 6 | 7^{7}
(Italy) Lorenzo Giustino | 3 | 6^{4}

=== Top half ===
First round
1 | (Australia) A Vukic | 1 | 3
(United Kingdom) R Peniston | 6 | 6
Q | (Israel) Y Oliel | 6 | 3 | 2
(Italy) T Fabbiano | 2 | 6 | 6
SE | (France) E Furness | 7^{7} | 3
PR | (Austria) S Ofner | 6^{3} | 2^{r}
(Czech Republic) D Svrčina | 3 | 1
5 | (Argentina) P Cachin | 6 | 6
4 | (Czech Republic) V Kopřiva | 6 | 6
(Bosnia and Herzegovina) M Bašić | 3 | 2
LL | (Australia) M Purcell | 4 | 3
Q | (France) C Tabur | 6 | 6
(Ukraine) V Sachko | 3 | 0^{r}
Q | (Czech Republic) L Rosol | 6 | 0
(France) G Blancaneaux | 6 | 6
7 | (Argentina) JP Ficovich | 4 | 3

Second round
(United Kingdom) R Peniston | 1 | 6 | 0
(Italy) T Fabbiano | 6 | 4 | 6
SE | (France) E Furness | 0 | 3
5 | (Argentina) P Cachin | 6 | 6
4 | (Czech Republic) V Kopřiva | 2 | 4
Q | (France) C Tabur | 6 | 6
Q | (Czech Republic) L Rosol | 6 | 2 | 6^{3}
(France) G Blancaneaux | 1 | 6 | 7^{7}

Quarterfinals
(Italy) T Fabbiano | 3 | 3
5 | (Argentina) P Cachin | 6 | 6
Q | (France) C Tabur | 0 | 1
(France) G Blancaneaux | 6 | 6

Semifinals
5 | (Argentina) P Cachin | 2 | 6 | 6
(France) G Blancaneaux | 6 | 2 | 3

=== Bottom half ===
First round
8 | (Italy) F Gaio | 6 | 6
Q | (Poland) D Michalski | 3 | 1
WC | (Czech Republic) J Forejtek | 7 | 4 | 6
Q | (Germany) Lucas Gerch | 5 | 6 | 3
(Romania) M Copil | 6 | 6^{2} | 5
(Italy) L Giustino | 3 | 7^{7} | 7
LL | (Japan) K Uchida | 6 | 4 | 3
Q | (Italy) M Donati | 2 | 6 | 6
6 | (Netherlands) J de Jong | 6^{6} | 6^{6}
WC | (Czech Republic) M Krumich | 7^{8} | 7^{8}
WC | (Czech Republic) A Paulson | 6^{2} | 6^{6}
(Germany) M Marterer | 7^{7} | 7^{8}
(Bulgaria) D Kuzmanov | 6 | 6
Alt | (Ukraine) I Marchenko | 1 | 3
(Italy) R Bonadio | 2 | 4
2 | (Portugal) N Borges | 6 | 6

Second round
8 | (Italy) F Gaio | 7^{7} | 2 | 7
WC | (Czech Republic) J Forejtek | 6^{5} | 6 | 5
(Italy) L Giustino | 6 | 6
Q | (Italy) M Donati | 1 | 3
WC | (Czech Republic) M Krumich | 3 | 1
(Germany) M Marterer | 6 | 6
(Bulgaria) D Kuzmanov | 6 | 7
2 | (Portugal) N Borges | 1 | 5

Quarterfinals
8 | (Italy) F Gaio | 3 | 6 | 6^{7}
(Italy) L Giustino | 6 | 3 | 7^{9}
(Germany) M Marterer | 1 | 0
(Bulgaria) D Kuzmanov | 6 | 6

Semifinals
(Italy) L Giustino | 7^{7} | 4 | 6
(Bulgaria) D Kuzmanov | 6^{4} | 6 | 2
