= 2020 Maia Challenger =

- Date: 30 November – 6 December
- Edition: 2nd
- Surface: Clay
- Location: Maia, Portugal

Champions

Singles
- (Portugal) Pedro Sousa

Doubles
- (Czech Republic) Zdeněk Kolář / (Italy) Andrea Vavassori
- Maia Challenger

The 2020 Maia Open was a professional tennis tournament played on clay courts. It was the second edition of the tournament which was part of the 2020 ATP Challenger Tour. It took place in Maia, Portugal from 30 November to 6 December 2020.

== Singles main-draw entrants ==
=== Seeds ===
Country	Player	Rank^{1}	Seed
ESP	Pedro Martínez	85	1
POR	Pedro Sousa	113	2
SVK	Jozef Kovalík	131	3
SUI	Henri Laaksonen	135	4
SRB	Nikola Milojević	138	5
ITA	Paolo Lorenzi	144	6
ITA	Lorenzo Giustino	149	7
ESP	Carlos Taberner	152	8

- ^{1} Rankings are as of 23 November 2020.

=== Other entrants ===
The following players received wildcards into the singles main draw:

- (Portugal) Nuno Borges
- (Portugal) Gastão Elias
- (Portugal) Gonçalo Oliveira

The following player received entry into the singles main draw as an alternate:

- (France) Geoffrey Blancaneaux

The following players received entry from the qualifying draw:

- (Croatia) Duje Ajduković
- (Turkey) Altuğ Çelikbilek
- (France) Maxime Hamou
- (Czech Republic) Michael Vrbenský

== Champions ==
=== Singles ===
- (Portugal) Pedro Sousa def. (Spain) Carlos Taberner 6–0, 5–7, 6–2.

=== Doubles ===
- (Czech Republic) Zdeněk Kolář / (Italy) Andrea Vavassori def. (United Kingdom) Lloyd Glasspool / (Finland) Harri Heliövaara 6–3, 6–4.
