= 2022 Maia Challenger – Doubles =

Doubles
- 2022 Maia Challenger

Final
- Champions: (United Kingdom) Julian Cash (United Kingdom) Henry Patten
- Runners-up: (Portugal) Nuno Borges (Portugal) Francisco Cabral
- Score: 6–3, 3–6, [10–8]

Events
Singles	Doubles
- Maia Challenger

Nuno Borges and Francisco Cabral were the defending champions but lost in the final to Julian Cash and Henry Patten.

Cash and Patten won the title after defeating Borges and Cabral 6–3, 3–6, [10–8] in the final.

== Seeds ==
1. (Portugal) Nuno Borges / (Portugal) Francisco Cabral (final)
2. (United Kingdom) Julian Cash / (United Kingdom) Henry Patten (champions)
3. (Greece) Petros Tsitsipas / (Netherlands) Sem Verbeek (semifinals)
4. (Poland) Karol Drzewiecki / (Austria) Maximilian Neuchrist (first round)

== Draw ==
Key

- Q = Qualifier
- WC = Wild card
- LL = Lucky loser
- Alt = Alternate
- ITF = ITF entry
- PR = Protected ranking
- SR = Special ranking
- SE = Special exempt
- JE = Junior exempt
- JR = Junior Accelerator Programme entrant
- CO = College Accelerator Programme entrant
- NG = Next Gen Accelerator Program entrant
- w/o = Walkover
- r = Retired
- d = Defaulted

First round
1	(Portugal) N Borges (Portugal) F Cabral	7^{7}	6
(Spain) N Álvarez Varona (Kazakhstan) T Skatov	6^{4}	2
(Uzbekistan) D Istomin; E Karlovskiy	4	6^{7}
(Portugal) J Faria (Portugal) D Vale	6	7^{9}
3	(Greece) Pe Tsitsipas (Netherlands) S Verbeek	7^{7}	6
(Portugal) J Domingues (Portugal) P Sousa	6^{4}	4
WC	(Portugal) João Silva (Portugal) Tiago Silva	3	2
WC	(Portugal) Francisco Rocha (Portugal) H Rocha	6	6
(Romania) VV Cornea; I Gakhov	0^{r}
(Poland) Ł Kubot (Poland) S Walków	5
(Ukraine) V Sachko (Kazakhstan) D Yevseyev	5	7^{11}	[10]
4	(Poland) K Drzewiecki (Austria) M Neuchrist	7	6^{9}	[4]
(Poland) Artsiom Dabryian (Portugal) G Oliveira	2	4
(Portugal) Fábio Coelho (Portugal) Gonçalo Falcão	6	6
(Germany) H Jebens (Germany) Niklas Schell	3	3
2	(United Kingdom) J Cash (United Kingdom) H Patten	6	6

Quarterfinals
1	(Portugal) N Borges (Portugal) F Cabral	6	6
(Portugal) J Faria (Portugal) D Vale	2	0
3	(Greece) Pe Tsitsipas (Netherlands) S Verbeek	6	6
WC	(Portugal) F Rocha (Portugal) H Rocha	3	3
(Poland) Ł Kubot (Poland) S Walków	6	7
(Ukraine) V Sachko (Kazakhstan) D Yevseyev	4	5
(Portugal) F Coelho (Portugal) G Falcão	1	4
2	(United Kingdom) J Cash (United Kingdom) H Patten	6	6

Semifinals
1	(Portugal) N Borges (Portugal) F Cabral	7	6
3	(Greece) Pe Tsitsipas (Netherlands) S Verbeek	5	3
(Poland) Ł Kubot (Poland) S Walków	5	6	[4]
2	(United Kingdom) J Cash (United Kingdom) H Patten	7	4	[10]

Final
1	(Portugal) N Borges (Portugal) F Cabral	3	6	[8]
2	(United Kingdom) J Cash (United Kingdom) H Patten	6	3	[10]
