= 2021 Maia Challenger II – Doubles =

Doubles
- 2021 Maia Challenger II

Final
- Champions: (Portugal) Nuno Borges (Portugal) Francisco Cabral
- Runners-up: (Poland) Piotr Matuszewski (Austria) David Pichler
- Score: 6–4, 7–5

Events
| Singles | Doubles |
- Maia Challenger

Nuno Borges and Francisco Cabral were the defending champions and successfully defended their title, defeating Piotr Matuszewski and David Pichler 6–4, 7–5 in the final.

== Seeds ==
1. (Austria) Alexander Erler / (Spain) David Vega Hernández (quarterfinals, withdrew)
2. (France) Sadio Doumbia / (France) Fabien Reboul (semifinals)
3. (Slovakia) Andrej Martin / (Portugal) Gonçalo Oliveira (quarterfinals)
4. (Italy) Marco Bortolotti / (Spain) Sergio Martos Gornés (first round)

== Draw ==
Key

- Q = Qualifier
- WC = Wild card
- LL = Lucky loser
- Alt = Alternate
- ITF = ITF entry
- PR = Protected ranking
- SR = Special ranking
- SE = Special exempt
- JE = Junior exempt
- JR = Junior Accelerator Programme entrant
- CO = College Accelerator Programme entrant
- NG = Next Gen Accelerator Program entrant
- w/o = Walkover
- r = Retired
- d = Defaulted

First round
1 | (Austria) A Erler (Spain) D Vega Hernández | 6 | 7
(Russia) I Gakhov (Romania) FC Jianu | 4 | 5
Alt | (Italy) Edoardo Lavagno (Switzerland) D Wenger | 6 | 6
WC | (Portugal) Francisco Rocha (Portugal) H Rocha | 3 | 3
3 | (Slovakia) A Martin (Portugal) G Oliveira | 6 | 6
WC | (Portugal) J Faria (Portugal) Miguel Gomes | 2 | 2
(Poland) P Matuszewski (Austria) D Pichler | 7^{7} | 6
(France) Quentin Folliot (France) M Janvier | 6^{5} | 3
(Portugal) N Borges (Portugal) F Cabral | w/o
Alt | (Germany) Elmar Ejupovic (Germany) L Wessels
PR | (Japan) T Matsui (Japan) K Uesugi | 1 | 6 | [10]
4 | (Italy) M Bortolotti (Spain) S Martos Gornés | 6 | 3 | [7]
(France) Alexis Gautier (France) Matthieu Perchicot | 6^{8} | 5
WC | (Portugal) Fábio Coelho (Portugal) Gonçalo Falcão | 7^{10} | 7
(Netherlands) M Hermans (Netherlands) G Smits | 3 | 5
2 | (France) S Doumbia (France) F Reboul | 6 | 7

Quarterfinals
1 | (Austria) A Erler (Spain) D Vega Hernández
Alt | (Italy) E Lavagno (Switzerland) D Wenger | w/o
3 | (Slovakia) A Martin (Portugal) G Oliveira | 7^{7} | 1 | [8]
(Poland) P Matuszewski (Austria) D Pichler | 6^{4} | 6 | [10]
(Portugal) N Borges (Portugal) F Cabral | 6 | 6
PR | (Japan) T Matsui (Japan) K Uesugi | 2 | 1
WC | (Portugal) F Coelho (Portugal) G Falcão | 3 | 2
2 | (France) S Doumbia (France) F Reboul | 6 | 6

Semifinals
Alt | (Italy) E Lavagno (Switzerland) D Wenger | 6 | 4 | [8]
(Poland) P Matuszewski (Austria) D Pichler | 4 | 6 | [10]
(Portugal) N Borges (Portugal) F Cabral | 6 | 6
2 | (France) S Doumbia (France) F Reboul | 4 | 2

Final
(Poland) P Matuszewski (Austria) D Pichler | 4 | 5
(Portugal) N Borges (Portugal) F Cabral | 6 | 7
