= 2023 Maia Challenger – Doubles =

Doubles
- 2023 Maia Challenger

Final
- Champions: (Italy) Marco Bortolotti (Italy) Andrea Vavassori
- Runners-up: (Brazil) Fernando Romboli (Poland) Szymon Walków
- Score: 6–4, 3–6, [12–10]

Events
Singles	Doubles
- Maia Challenger

Julian Cash and Henry Patten were the defending champions but chose not to defend their title.

Marco Bortolotti and Andrea Vavassori won the title after defeating Fernando Romboli and Szymon Walków 6–4, 3–6, [12–10] in the final.

== Seeds ==
1. (Italy) Marco Bortolotti / (Italy) Andrea Vavassori (champions)
2. (Romania) Victor Vlad Cornea / (Austria) Philipp Oswald (semifinals)
3. (India) Anirudh Chandrasekar / Ivan Liutarevich (first round)
4. (Portugal) Nuno Borges / (Portugal) Francisco Cabral (semifinals)

== Draw ==
Key

- Q = Qualifier
- WC = Wild card
- LL = Lucky loser
- Alt = Alternate
- ITF = ITF entry
- PR = Protected ranking
- SR = Special ranking
- SE = Special exempt
- JE = Junior exempt
- JR = Junior Accelerator Programme entrant
- CO = College Accelerator Programme entrant
- NG = Next Gen Accelerator Program entrant
- w/o = Walkover
- r = Retired
- d = Defaulted

First round
1	(Italy) M Bortolotti (Italy) A Vavassori	6	6
(Portugal) J Faria (Portugal) H Rocha	4	4
(Belgium) M Geerts (France) C Hemery	4	6^{5}
WC	(Portugal) Francisco Rocha (Portugal) Tiago Silva	6	7^{7}
4	(Portugal) N Borges (Portugal) F Cabral	4	6	[10]
WC	(Portugal) Pedro Araújo (Portugal) F Gil	6	1	[5]
(Portugal) Gonçalo Falcão (Portugal) T Pereira	4	0
(Italy) Alexander Weis (Germany) L Wessels	6	6
(France) K de Schepper (Argentina) M Trungelliti	4	7^{7}	[10]
(Spain) M Damas (Greece) S Sakellaridis	6	6^{3}	[8]
(Brazil) F Romboli (Poland) S Walków	3	6	[10]
3	(India) A Chandrasekar; I Liutarevich	6	3	[3]
(Uzbekistan) K Sultanov (Ukraine) V Uzhylovskyi	4	6	[10]
Alt	(Romania) FC Jianu; A Vatutin	6	2	[7]
(Netherlands) M Hermans (Netherlands) Ryan Nijboer	2	6	[5]
2	(Romania) VV Cornea (Austria) P Oswald	6	2	[10]

Quarterfinals
1	(Italy) M Bortolotti (Italy) A Vavassori	6	6
WC	(Portugal) F Rocha (Portugal) T Silva	0	2
4	(Portugal) N Borges (Portugal) F Cabral	w/o
(Italy) A Weis (Germany) L Wessels
(France) K de Schepper (Argentina) M Trungelliti	6^{5}	2
(Brazil) F Romboli (Poland) S Walków	7^{7}	6
(Uzbekistan) K Sultanov (Ukraine) V Uzhylovskyi	1	2
2	(Romania) VV Cornea (Austria) P Oswald	6	6

Semifinals
1	(Italy) M Bortolotti (Italy) A Vavassori	6	3	[10]
4	(Portugal) N Borges (Portugal) F Cabral	4	6	[6]
(Brazil) F Romboli (Poland) S Walków	3	7^{13}	[12]
2	(Romania) VV Cornea (Austria) P Oswald	6	6^{11}	[10]

Final
1	(Italy) M Bortolotti (Italy) A Vavassori	6	3	[12]
(Brazil) F Romboli (Poland) S Walków	4	6	[10]
