= 2022 I.ČLTK Prague Open – Men's doubles =

Men's doubles
- 2022 I.ČLTK Prague Open

Final
- Champions: (Portugal) Nuno Borges (Portugal) Francisco Cabral
- Runners-up: (Czech Republic) Andrew Paulson (Czech Republic) Adam Pavlásek
- Score: 6–4, 6–7^{(3–7)}, [10–5]

Events
Singles	men	women
Doubles	men	women
- I.ČLTK Prague Open

The men's doubles of the 2022 I.ČLTK Prague Open tournament took place on clay in Prague, Czech Republic.

Marc Polmans and Sergiy Stakhovsky were the winners of the last edition but did not defend their title. Polmans chose not to participate, while Stakhovsky retired at the beginning of 2022.

Nuno Borges and Francisco Cabral won the title after defeating Andrew Paulson and Adam Pavlásek 6–4, 6–7^{(3–7)}, [10–5] in the final.

== Seeds ==
1. (Czech Republic) Roman Jebavý / (Netherlands) Matwé Middelkoop (first round)
2. (France) Sadio Doumbia / (France) Fabien Reboul (quarterfinals)
3. (Portugal) Nuno Borges / (Portugal) Francisco Cabral (champions)
4. (United States) Nicholas Monroe / (Brazil) Fernando Romboli (semifinals)

== Draw ==
Key

- Q = Qualifier
- WC = Wild card
- LL = Lucky loser
- Alt = Alternate
- ITF = ITF entry
- PR = Protected ranking
- SR = Special ranking
- SE = Special exempt
- JE = Junior exempt
- JR = Junior Accelerator Programme entrant
- CO = College Accelerator Programme entrant
- NG = Next Gen Accelerator Program entrant
- w/o = Walkover
- r = Retired
- d = Defaulted

First round
1	(Czech Republic) R Jebavý (Netherlands) M Middelkoop	5	6^{4}
(Uzbekistan) S Fayziev (Greece) M Kalovelonis	7	7^{7}
WC	(Czech Republic) J Forejtek (Czech Republic) M Vrbenský
(Czech Republic) M Gengel (Czech Republic) L Rosol	w/o
3	(Portugal) N Borges (Portugal) F Cabral	6	4	[10]
Alt	(Italy) L Giustino (Bulgaria) D Kuzmanov	2	6	[6]
(Romania) M Copil (Australia) M Purcell	6	6
(Kazakhstan) G Lomakin (India) V Vardhan	4	3
(Netherlands) J de Jong (Netherlands) B Stevens	4	6	[10]
(Poland) K Drzewiecki (Poland) P Matuszewski	6	3	[8]
(India) S Balaji (India) J Nedunchezhiyan	6^{5}	2
4	(United States) N Monroe (Brazil) F Romboli	7^{7}	6
WC	(Czech Republic) A Paulson (Czech Republic) A Pavlásek	6	6
(France) G Blancaneaux (Italy) T Fabbiano	1	4
(Argentina) P Cachin (Argentina) JP Ficovich	2	3
2	(France) S Doumbia (France) F Reboul	6	6

Quarterfinals
(Uzbekistan) S Fayziev (Greece) M Kalovelonis	7^{7}	6^{8}	[4]
(Czech Republic) M Gengel (Czech Republic) L Rosol	6^{2}	7^{10}	[10]
3	(Portugal) N Borges (Portugal) F Cabral	6	6
(Romania) M Copil (Australia) M Purcell	3	4
(Netherlands) J de Jong (Netherlands) B Stevens	4	4
4	(United States) N Monroe (Brazil) F Romboli	6	6
WC	(Czech Republic) A Paulson (Czech Republic) A Pavlásek	6	6
2	(France) S Doumbia (France) F Reboul	3	2

Semifinals
(Czech Republic) M Gengel (Czech Republic) L Rosol	4	4
3	(Portugal) N Borges (Portugal) F Cabral	6	6
4	(United States) N Monroe (Brazil) F Romboli	7	6^{0}	[8]
WC	(Czech Republic) A Paulson (Czech Republic) A Pavlásek	5	7^{7}	[10]

Final
3	(Portugal) N Borges (Portugal) F Cabral	6	6^{3}	[10]
WC	(Czech Republic) A Paulson (Czech Republic) A Pavlásek	4	7^{7}	[5]
