= 2021 Maia Challenger =

- Date: 6–12 December
- Edition: 3rd
- Surface: Clay
- Location: Maia, Portugal

Champions

Singles
- (France) Geoffrey Blancaneaux

Doubles
- (Portugal) Nuno Borges / (Portugal) Francisco Cabral
- Maia Challenger

The 2021 Maia Open was a professional tennis tournament played on clay courts. It was the third edition of the tournament which was part of the 2021 ATP Challenger Tour. It took place in Maia, Portugal from 6 to 12 December 2021.

== Singles main-draw entrants ==
=== Seeds ===
Country	Player	Rank^{1}	Seed
SVK	Andrej Martin	121	1
BEL	Kimmer Coppejans	205	2
POR	Gastão Elias	222	3
POR	João Domingues	248	4
POR	Nuno Borges	253	5
TPE	Tseng Chun-hsin	254	6
CAN	Steven Diez	269	7
FRA	Geoffrey Blancaneaux	281	8

- ^{1} Rankings are as of 29 November 2021.

=== Other entrants ===
The following players received wildcards into the singles main draw:

- (Portugal) Pedro Araújo
- (Portugal) Tiago Cação
- (Portugal) Duarte Vale

The following players received entry into the singles main draw using protected rankings:

- (Morocco) Elliot Benchetrit
- (Belgium) Julien Cagnina

The following players received entry from the qualifying draw:

- (Italy) Lorenzo Bocchi
- (Spain) Miguel Damas
- (Germany) Oscar Moraing
- (Italy) Simone Roncalli

== Champions ==
=== Singles ===
- (France) Geoffrey Blancaneaux def. (Chinese Taipei) Tseng Chun-hsin 3–6, 6–3, 6–2.

=== Doubles ===
- (Portugal) Nuno Borges / (Portugal) Francisco Cabral def. (Slovakia) Andrej Martin / (Portugal) Gonçalo Oliveira 6–3, 6–4.
