= 2022 Maia Challenger =

- Date: 28 November – 4 December
- Edition: 5th
- Surface: Clay
- Location: Maia, Portugal

Champions

Singles
- (France) Luca Van Assche

Doubles
- (United Kingdom) Julian Cash / (United Kingdom) Henry Patten
- Maia Challenger

The 2022 Maia Open was a professional tennis tournament played on clay courts. It was the fifth edition of the tournament which was part of the 2022 ATP Challenger Tour. It took place in Maia, Portugal from 28 November to 4 December 2022.

== Singles main-draw entrants ==
=== Seeds ===
Country	Player	Rank^{1}	Seed
POR	Nuno Borges	91	1
AUT	Jurij Rodionov	122	2
SWE	Elias Ymer	130	3
FRA	Geoffrey Blancaneaux	135	4
AUS	Aleksandar Vukic	140	5
KAZ	Timofey Skatov	146	6
ITA	Luciano Darderi	178	7
ITA	Riccardo Bonadio	191	8

- ^{1} Rankings are as of 21 November 2022.

=== Other entrants ===
The following players received wildcards into the singles main draw:

- (Portugal) Fábio Coelho
- (Portugal) João Domingues
- (Portugal) Gonçalo Oliveira

The following player received entry into the singles main draw using a protected ranking:

- (Portugal) Pedro Sousa

The following players received entry into the singles main draw as alternates:

- (Ukraine) Vitaliy Sachko
- (Germany) Louis Wessels

The following players received entry from the qualifying draw:

- (Belgium) Raphaël Collignon
- (Uzbekistan) Denis Istomin
- Evgeny Karlovskiy
- (Bulgaria) Alexandar Lazarov
- (Austria) Maximilian Neuchrist
- (Belgium) Gauthier Onclin

== Champions ==
=== Singles ===
- (France) Luca Van Assche def. (Austria) Maximilian Neuchrist 3–6, 6–4, 6–0.

=== Doubles ===
- (United Kingdom) Julian Cash / (United Kingdom) Henry Patten def. (Portugal) Nuno Borges / (Portugal) Francisco Cabral 6–3, 3–6, [10–8].
