= 2022 I.ČLTK Prague Open – Women's singles =

Women's singles
- 2022 I.ČLTK Prague Open

Final
- Champion: (Poland) Maja Chwalińska
- Runner-up: (Georgia (country)) Ekaterine Gorgodze
- Score: 7–5, 6–3

Events
Singles	men	women
Doubles	men	women
- I.ČLTK Prague Open

Jule Niemeier was the defending champion but chose not to participate.

Maja Chwalińska won the title, defeating Ekaterine Gorgodze in the final, 7–5, 6–3.

== Seeds ==
1. (Georgia (country)) Ekaterine Gorgodze (final)
2. (Hungary) Réka Luca Jani (quarterfinals)
3. (China) Yuan Yue (first round)
4. (Greece) Despina Papamichail (first round)
5. (Slovakia) Rebecca Šramková (first round)
6. (Greece) Valentini Grammatikopoulou (first round)
7. (Netherlands) Suzan Lamens (withdrew)
8. (Australia) Lizette Cabrera (quarterfinals)

== Draw ==
Key

- Q = Qualifier
- WC = Wild card
- LL = Lucky loser
- Alt = Alternate
- ITF = ITF entry
- PR = Protected ranking
- SR = Special ranking
- SE = Special exempt
- JE = Junior exempt
- JR = Junior Accelerator Programme entrant
- CO = College Accelerator Programme entrant
- NG = Next Gen Accelerator Program entrant
- w/o = Walkover
- r = Retired
- d = Defaulted

=== Finals ===
Semifinals
1	(Georgia (country)) Ekaterine Gorgodze	6	6
(Mexico) Fernanda Contreras	4	3
(Poland) Maja Chwalińska	7	6
WC	(Czech Republic) Miriam Kolodziejová	5	2

Final
1	(Georgia (country)) Ekaterine Gorgodze	5	3
(Poland) Maja Chwalińska	7	6

=== Top half ===
First round
1	(Georgia (country)) E Gorgodze	6	6
Q	(Germany) L Meyer auf der Heide	1	4
(United States) C McNally	6	6
Q	(Czech Republic) L Klimovičová	3	3
LL	(Mexico) AS Sánchez	4	4
(Czech Republic) J Malečková	6	6
Q	(Japan) N Hanatani	3	3
8	(Australia) L Cabrera	6	6
3	(China) Y Yuan	2	2
Q	(Serbia) N Stevanović	6	6
Q	(Romania) A Prisăcariu	6^{3}	6	7^{7}
WC	(Czech Republic) B Palicová	7^{7}	3	6^{4}
(Mexico) F Contreras	6	6^{6}	6
Q	(Czech Republic) A Laboutková	4	7^{8}	3
PR	(Australia) P Hon	6	6
5	(Slovakia) R Šramková	2	1

Second round
1	(Georgia (country)) E Gorgodze	6	6
(United States) C McNally	4	0
(Czech Republic) J Malečková	6	5	5
8	(Australia) L Cabrera	2	7	7
Q	(Serbia) N Stevanović	5	3
Q	(Romania) A Prisăcariu	7	6
(Mexico) F Contreras	3	6	7
PR	(Australia) P Hon	6	4	5

Quarterfinals
1	(Georgia (country)) E Gorgodze	6	6
8	(Australia) L Cabrera	2	2
Q	(Romania) A Prisăcariu	3	6^{4}
(Mexico) F Contreras	6	7^{7}

Semifinals
1	(Georgia (country)) E Gorgodze	6	6
(Mexico) F Contreras	4	3

=== Bottom half ===
First round
Q	(Czech Republic) A Dețiuc	2	5
(Chile) B Gatica	6	7
WC	(Ukraine) D Lopatetska	7	1	2
Q	(Czech Republic) D Šalková	5	6	6
(Czech Republic) L Nosková	1	1
SE	(Czech Republic) N Bartůňková	6	6
(Poland) M Chwalińska	7^{7}	6
4	(Greece) D Papamichail	6^{2}	1
6	(Greece) V Grammatikopoulou	4	2
(Switzerland) S Bandecchi	6	6
WC	(Czech Republic) L Havlíčková	4	6^{4}
WC	(Czech Republic) M Kolodziejová	6	7^{7}
(Brazil) C Alves	4	7^{7}	3
(Japan) M Uchijima	6	6^{5}	6
(United States) H Chang	0	6	2
2	(Hungary) RL Jani	6	4	6

Second round
(Chile) B Gatica	7^{7}	6
Q	(Czech Republic) D Šalková	6^{4}	3
SE	(Czech Republic) N Bartůňková	3	0
(Poland) M Chwalińska	6	6
(Switzerland) S Bandecchi	5	3
WC	(Czech Republic) M Kolodziejová	7	6
(Japan) M Uchijima	1	6	4
2	(Hungary) RL Jani	6	4	6

Quarterfinals
(Chile) B Gatica	6^{2}	1
(Poland) M Chwalińska	7^{7}	6
WC	(Czech Republic) M Kolodziejová	4	7	6
2	(Hungary) RL Jani	6	5	2

Semifinals
(Poland) M Chwalińska	7	6
WC	(Czech Republic) M Kolodziejová	5	2
