= 2025 Maia Challenger – Doubles =

Doubles
- 2025 Maia Challenger

Final
- Champions: (Bulgaria) Alexander Donski (Portugal) Tiago Pereira
- Runners-up: (France) Théo Arribagé (Croatia) Nino Serdarušić
- Score: 6–2, 7–6^{(8–6)}

Events
Singles	Doubles
- Maia Challenger

Théo Arribagé and Francisco Cabral were the defending champions but only Arribagé chose to defend his title, partnering Nino Serdarušić. They lost in the final to Alexander Donski and Tiago Pereira.

Donski and Pereira won the title after defeating Arribagé and Serdarušić 6–2, 7–6^{(8–6)} in the final.

== Seeds ==
1. (France) Théo Arribagé / (Croatia) Nino Serdarušić (final)
2. (Poland) Karol Drzewiecki / (Poland) Piotr Matuszewski (quarterfinals)
3. (Spain) Íñigo Cervantes / (Austria) David Pichler (semifinals)
4. (Serbia) Stefan Latinović / (Poland) Filip Pieczonka (first round)

== Draw ==
Key

- Q = Qualifier
- WC = Wild card
- LL = Lucky loser
- Alt = Alternate
- ITF = ITF entry
- PR = Protected ranking
- SR = Special ranking
- SE = Special exempt
- JE = Junior exempt
- JR = Junior Accelerator Programme entrant
- CO = College Accelerator Programme entrant
- NG = Next Gen Accelerator Program entrant
- w/o = Walkover
- r = Retired
- d = Defaulted

First round
1	(France) T Arribagé (Croatia) N Serdarušić	6	6
(Portugal) Francisco Rocha (Portugal) H Rocha	1	4
(Czech Republic) Jiří Barnat (Czech Republic) F Duda	6	4	[7]
(France) G Blancaneaux (Slovakia) A Martin	4	6	[10]
4	(Serbia) S Latinović (Poland) F Pieczonka	4	4
(Serbia) I Sabanov (Serbia) M Sabanov	6	6
(Romania) A Jecan (Romania) B Pavel	7^{7}	6
Alt	(Italy) F Agamenone (Spain) N Sánchez Izquierdo	6^{4}	2
WC	(Portugal) João Teixeira (Portugal) Guilherme Valdoleiros	4	2
(Spain) M Mansilla Díez (Spain) B Pujol Navarro	6	6
I Liutarevich (Italy) G Ricca	6	6^{5}	[11]
3	(Spain) Í Cervantes (Austria) D Pichler	3	7^{7}	[13]
(Bulgaria) A Donski (Portugal) T Pereira	6	6
(Czech Republic) D Poljak (Spain) D Vega Hernández	3	2
WC	(Portugal) T Cação (Portugal) T Torres	4	3
2	(Poland) K Drzewiecki (Poland) P Matuszewski	6	6

Quarterfinals
1	(France) T Arribagé (Croatia) N Serdarušić	7^{7}	6
(France) G Blancaneaux (Slovakia) A Martin	6^{5}	2
(Serbia) I Sabanov (Serbia) M Sabanov	0	2
(Romania) A Jecan (Romania) B Pavel	6	6
(Spain) M Mansilla Díez (Spain) B Pujol Navarro	5	4
3	(Spain) Í Cervantes (Austria) D Pichler	7	6
(Bulgaria) A Donski (Portugal) T Pereira	6	6^{4}	[10]
2	(Poland) K Drzewiecki (Poland) P Matuszewski	1	7^{7}	[8]

Semifinals
1	(France) T Arribagé (Croatia) N Serdarušić	7	7^{7}
(Romania) A Jecan (Romania) B Pavel	5	6^{5}
3	(Spain) Í Cervantes (Austria) D Pichler	3	1
(Bulgaria) A Donski (Portugal) T Pereira	6	6

Final
1	(France) T Arribagé (Croatia) N Serdarušić	2	6^{6}
(Bulgaria) A Donski (Portugal) T Pereira	6	7^{8}
