= 2025 Maia Challenger =

- Date: 24 – 30 November
- Edition: 8th
- Surface: Clay (indoor)
- Location: Maia, Portugal

Champions

Singles
- (Denmark) Elmer Møller

Doubles
- (Bulgaria) Alexander Donski / (Portugal) Tiago Pereira
- Maia Challenger

The 2025 Maia Open was a professional tennis tournament played on clay courts. It was the eighth edition of the tournament which was part of the 2025 ATP Challenger Tour. It took place in Maia, Portugal from 24 to 30 November 2025.

== Singles main-draw entrants ==
=== Seeds ===
Country	Player	Rank^{1}	Seed
GBR	Jan Choinski	129	1
POR	Jaime Faria	149	2
DEN	Elmer Møller	152	3
POR	Henrique Rocha	153	4
ESP	Daniel Mérida	172	5
~~AUT~~	~~Lukas Neumayer~~	~~189~~	~~6~~
ITA	Lorenzo Giustino	220	7
CZE	Zdeněk Kolář	222	8

- ^{1} Rankings are as of 17 November 2025.

=== Other entrants ===
The following players received wildcards into the singles main draw:

- (Portugal) Pedro Araújo
- (Portugal) Gastão Elias
- (Portugal) Francisco Rocha

The following players received entry into the singles main draw using protected rankings:

- (Bulgaria) Adrian Andreev
- (Italy) Stefano Napolitano

The following player received entry into the singles main draw as a special exempt:

- (Italy) Gianluca Cadenasso

The following player received entry into the singles main draw through the Next Gen Accelerator programme:

- (Italy) Federico Bondioli

The following players received entry from the qualifying draw:

- (Spain) Tomás Currás Abasolo
- (Spain) Carlos López Montagud
- (France) Lilian Marmousez
- (Slovakia) Andrej Martin
- (Spain) Carlos Sánchez Jover
- (Spain) Andrés Santamarta Roig

The following players received entry as lucky losers:

- (Romania) Cezar Crețu
- Alexey Vatutin

== Champions ==
=== Singles ===
- (Denmark) Elmer Møller def. (Slovakia) Andrej Martin 6–4, 6–1.

=== Doubles ===
- (Bulgaria) Alexander Donski / (Portugal) Tiago Pereira def. (France) Théo Arribagé / (Croatia) Nino Serdarušić 6–2, 7–6^{(8–6)}.
