= 2022 I.ČLTK Prague Open – Women's doubles =

Women's doubles
- 2022 I.ČLTK Prague Open

Final
- Champions: (Chile) Bárbara Gatica (Brazil) Rebeca Pereira
- Runners-up: (Czech Republic) Miriam Kolodziejová (Czech Republic) Jesika Malečková
- Score: 6–4, 6–2

Events
| Singles | men | women |
| Doubles | men | women |
- I.ČLTK Prague Open

Anna Bondár and Kimberley Zimmermann were the defending champions, but chose not to participate.

Bárbara Gatica and Rebeca Pereira won the title, defeating Miriam Kolodziejová and Jesika Malečková in the final, 6–4, 6–2.

== Seeds ==
1. (Chile) Bárbara Gatica / (Brazil) Rebeca Pereira (champions)
2. (Czech Republic) Miriam Kolodziejová / (Czech Republic) Jesika Malečková (final)
3. (Czech Republic) Anastasia Dețiuc / (Czech Republic) Johana Marková (first round)
4. (Greece) Despina Papamichail / (Serbia) Natalija Stevanović (first round, withdrew)

== Draw ==
Key

- Q = Qualifier
- WC = Wild card
- LL = Lucky loser
- Alt = Alternate
- ITF = ITF entry
- PR = Protected ranking
- SR = Special ranking
- SE = Special exempt
- JE = Junior exempt
- JR = Junior Accelerator Programme entrant
- CO = College Accelerator Programme entrant
- NG = Next Gen Accelerator Program entrant
- w/o = Walkover
- r = Retired
- d = Defaulted

=== Draw ===
First round
1 | (Chile) B Gatica (Brazil) R Pereira | 7^{7} | 6
WC | (Czech Republic) V Hažmuková (Czech Republic) P Kubíková | 6^{4} | 0
(Germany) T Morderger (Germany) Y Morderger | 7 | 6
(Israel) L Glushko (Australia) P Hon | 5 | 2
3 | (Czech Republic) A Dețiuc (Czech Republic) J Marková | 3 | 4
(Japan) N Hanatani (Japan) M Uchijima | 6 | 6
(Czech Republic) D Hindová (Czech Republic) A Laboutková | 4 | 7 | [10]
(Czech Republic) L Havlíčková (Czech Republic) A Šmejkalová | 6 | 5 | [5]
(Brazil) C Alves (Romania) N Dascălu | 6 | 6
(Czech Republic) A Nová (Czech Republic) A Pospíšilová | 1 | 0
(Czech Republic) M Slaměníková (Czech Republic) M Smékalová | w/o
4 | (Greece) D Papamichail (Serbia) N Stevanović
(Czech Republic) L Klimovičová (Czech Republic) D Šalková | 6 | 6^{6} | [10]
(United States) H Chang (Mexico) AS Sánchez | 3 | 7^{8} | [7]
(Ukraine) D Lopatetska (Romania) A Prisăcariu | 3 | 7 | [5]
2 | (Czech Republic) M Kolodziejová (Czech Republic) J Malečková | 6 | 5 | [10]

Quarterfinals
1 | (Chile) B Gatica (Brazil) R Pereira | 5 | 6 | [10]
(Germany) T Morderger (Germany) Y Morderger | 7 | 4 | [3]
(Japan) N Hanatani (Japan) M Uchijima | 6 | 7
(Czech Republic) D Hindová (Czech Republic) A Laboutková | 3 | 5
(Brazil) C Alves (Romania) N Dascălu | 6 | 6
(Czech Republic) M Slaměníková (Czech Republic) M Smékalová | 4 | 1
(Czech Republic) L Klimovičová (Czech Republic) D Šalková
2 | (Czech Republic) M Kolodziejová (Czech Republic) J Malečková | w/o

Semifinals
1 | (Chile) B Gatica (Brazil) R Pereira | 6 | 6
(Japan) N Hanatani (Japan) M Uchijima | 2 | 4
(Brazil) C Alves (Romania) N Dascălu | 3 | 3
2 | (Czech Republic) M Kolodziejová (Czech Republic) J Malečková | 6 | 6

Final
1 | (Chile) B Gatica (Brazil) R Pereira | 6 | 6
2 | (Czech Republic) M Kolodziejová (Czech Republic) J Malečková | 4 | 2
