= 2023 Maia Challenger =

- Date: 27 November – 3 December
- Edition: 6th
- Surface: Clay
- Location: Maia, Portugal

Champions

Singles
- (Portugal) Nuno Borges

Doubles
- (Italy) Marco Bortolotti / (Italy) Andrea Vavassori
- Maia Challenger

The 2023 Maia Open was a professional tennis tournament played on clay courts. It was the sixth edition of the tournament which was part of the 2023 ATP Challenger Tour. It took place in Maia, Portugal from 27 November to 3 December 2023.

== Singles main-draw entrants ==
=== Seeds ===
Country	Player	Rank^{1}	Seed
POR	Nuno Borges	79	1
ESP	Albert Ramos Viñolas	96	2
FRA	Benoît Paire	129	3
ITA	Fabio Fognini	131	4
SWE	Elias Ymer	159	5
ITA	Andrea Vavassori	167	6
FRA	Calvin Hemery	190	7
ITA	Riccardo Bonadio	204	8

- ^{1} Rankings are as of 20 November 2023.

=== Other entrants ===
The following players received wildcards into the singles main draw:

- (Portugal) Jaime Faria
- (Portugal) Francisco Rocha
- (Portugal) Duarte Vale

The following players received entry from the qualifying draw:

- (Portugal) Pedro Araújo
- (Sweden) Karl Friberg
- (Germany) Tom Gentzsch
- (Italy) Andrea Guerrieri
- (United Kingdom) Anton Matusevich
- Alexey Vatutin

The following players received entry as lucky losers:

- (Spain) Miguel Damas
- (Greece) Stefanos Sakellaridis

== Champions ==
=== Singles ===
- (Portugal) Nuno Borges def. (France) Benoît Paire 6–1, 6–4.

=== Doubles ===
- (Italy) Marco Bortolotti / (Italy) Andrea Vavassori def. (Brazil) Fernando Romboli / (Poland) Szymon Walków 6–4, 3–6, [12–10].
