= 2021 Maia Challenger II =

- Date: 13–19 December
- Edition: 4th
- Surface: Clay
- Location: Maia, Portugal

Champions

Singles
- (Chinese Taipei) Tseng Chun-hsin

Doubles
- (Portugal) Nuno Borges / (Portugal) Francisco Cabral
- Maia Challenger

The 2021 Maia Open II was a professional tennis tournament played on clay courts. It was the fourth edition of the tournament which was part of the 2021 ATP Challenger Tour. It took place in Maia, Portugal from 13 to 19 December 2021.

== Singles main-draw entrants ==
=== Seeds ===
Country	Player	Rank^{1}	Seed
SVK	Andrej Martin	120	1
BEL	Kimmer Coppejans	207	2
FRA	Maxime Janvier	219	3
POR	Gastão Elias	227	4
POR	Nuno Borges	228	5
POR	João Domingues	248	6
TPE	Tseng Chun-hsin	256	7
POR	Gonçalo Oliveira	284	8

- ^{1} Rankings are as of 6 December 2021.

=== Other entrants ===
The following players received wildcards into the singles main draw:

- (Portugal) Pedro Araújo
- (Portugal) Tiago Cação
- (Portugal) Fábio Coelho

The following player received entry into the singles main draw as a special exempt:

- (Ukraine) Oleg Prihodko

The following players received entry into the singles main draw as alternates:

- (Morocco) Elliot Benchetrit
- (Ukraine) Oleksii Krutykh
- (Spain) Oriol Roca Batalla

The following players received entry from the qualifying draw:

- (Germany) Elmar Ejupovic
- (Italy) Edoardo Lavagno
- (Italy) Luca Potenza
- (Switzerland) Damien Wenger

== Champions ==
=== Singles ===
- (Chinese Taipei) Tseng Chun-hsin def. (Portugal) Nuno Borges 5–7, 7–5, 6–2.

=== Doubles ===
- (Portugal) Nuno Borges / (Portugal) Francisco Cabral def. (Poland) Piotr Matuszewski / (Austria) David Pichler 6–4, 7–5.
