= 2022 I.ČLTK Prague Open =

Tennis tournament

- Date: 2–8 May 2022
- Edition: 29th (men); 17th (women)
- Category: ATP Challenger Tour; ITF Women's World Tennis Tour
- Prize money: €45,730 (men) $60,000 (women)
- Surface: Clay / Outdoor
- Location: Prague, Czech Republic

Champions

Men's singles
- (Argentina) Pedro Cachin

Women's singles
- (Poland) Maja Chwalińska

Men's doubles
- (Portugal) Nuno Borges / (Portugal) Francisco Cabral

Women's doubles
- (Chile) Bárbara Gatica / (Brazil) Rebeca Pereira
- I.ČLTK Prague Open

The 2022 I.ČLTK Prague Open was a tournament played on outdoor clay. It was the 29th edition for men and 17th for women, which were respectively part of the 2022 ATP Challenger Tour and the 2022 ITF Women's World Tennis Tour. It took place in Prague, Czech Republic between 2 and 8 May 2022.

== Men's singles main draw entrants ==
=== Seeds ===
Country	Player	Rank^{1}	Seed
AUS	Aleksandar Vukic	128	1
POR	Nuno Borges	131	2
~~CZE~~	~~Tomáš Macháč~~	~~144~~	~~3~~
CZE	Vít Kopřiva	166	4
ARG	Pedro Cachin	171	5
NED	Jesper de Jong	177	6
ARG	Juan Pablo Ficovich	181	7
ITA	Federico Gaio	182	8

- ^{1} Rankings are as of 25 April 2022.

=== Other entrants ===
The following players received wildcards into the singles main draw:

- (Czech Republic) Jonáš Forejtek
- (Czech Republic) Martin Krumich
- (Czech Republic) Andrew Paulson

The following player received entry into the singles main draw using a protected ranking:

- (Austria) Sebastian Ofner

The following player received entry into the singles main draw as a special exempt:

- (France) Evan Furness

The following player received entry into the singles main draw as an alternate:

- (Ukraine) Illya Marchenko

The following players received entry from the qualifying draw:

- (Italy) Matteo Donati
- (Germany) Lucas Gerch
- (Poland) Daniel Michalski
- (Israel) Yshai Oliel
- (Czech Republic) Lukáš Rosol
- (France) Clément Tabur

The following players received entry as lucky losers:

- (Australia) Max Purcell
- (Japan) Kaichi Uchida

== Women's singles main draw entrants ==
=== Seeds ===
Country	Player	Rank^{1}	Seed
GEO	Ekaterine Gorgodze	118	1
HUN	Réka Luca Jani	139	2
CHN	Yuan Yue	142	3
GRE	Despina Papamichail	172	4
SVK	Rebecca Šramková	179	5
GRE	Valentini Grammatikopoulou	183	6
~~NED~~	~~Suzan Lamens~~	~~184~~	~~7~~
AUS	Lizette Cabrera	188	8

- ^{1} Rankings are as of 25 April 2022.

=== Other entrants ===
The following players received wildcards into the singles main draw:

- (Czech Republic) Lucie Havlíčková
- (Czech Republic) Miriam Kolodziejová
- (Ukraine) Daria Lopatetska
- (Czech Republic) Barbora Palicová

The following player received entry using a protected ranking:

- (Australia) Priscilla Hon

The following player received entry as a special exempt:

- (Czech Republic) Nikola Bartůňková

The following players received entry from the qualifying draw:

- (Czech Republic) Anastasia Dețiuc
- (Japan) Nagi Hanatani
- (Czech Republic) Linda Klimovičová
- (Czech Republic) Aneta Laboutková
- (Germany) Luisa Meyer auf der Heide
- (Romania) Andreea Prisăcariu
- (Czech Republic) Dominika Šalková
- (Serbia) Natalija Stevanović

The following player received entry as a lucky loser:

- (Mexico) Ana Sofía Sánchez

== Champions ==
=== Men's singles ===
- (Argentina) Pedro Cachin def. (Italy) Lorenzo Giustino 6–3, 7–6^{(7–4)}.

=== Men's doubles ===
- (Portugal) Nuno Borges / (Portugal) Francisco Cabral def. (Czech Republic) Andrew Paulson / (Czech Republic) Adam Pavlásek 6–4, 6–7^{(3–7)}, [10–5].

=== Women's singles ===
- (Poland) Maja Chwalińska def. (Georgia (country)) Ekaterine Gorgodze, 7–5, 6–3

=== Women's doubles ===
- (Chile) Bárbara Gatica / (Brazil) Rebeca Pereira def. (Czech Republic) Miriam Kolodziejová / (Czech Republic) Jesika Malečková, 6–4, 6–2
