= 2024 Maia Challenger =

- Date: 25 November – 1 December
- Edition: 7th
- Surface: Clay (indoor)
- Location: Maia, Portugal

Champions

Singles
- (Bosnia and Herzegovina) Damir Džumhur

Doubles
- (France) Théo Arribagé / (Portugal) Francisco Cabral
- Maia Challenger

The 2024 Maia Open was a professional tennis tournament played on clay courts. It was the seventh edition of the tournament which was part of the 2024 ATP Challenger Tour. It took place in Maia, Portugal from 25 November to 1 December 2024.

== Singles main-draw entrants ==
=== Seeds ===
Country	Player	Rank^{1}	Seed
~~ITA~~	~~Fabio Fognini~~	~~84~~	~~1~~
ARG	Federico Coria	99	2
BIH	Damir Džumhur	106	3
ITA	Francesco Passaro	114	4
ESP	Albert Ramos Viñolas	151	5
DEN	Elmer Møller	153	6
ESP	Alejandro Moro Cañas	167	7
POR	Henrique Rocha	168	8

- ^{1} Rankings are as of 18 November 2024.

=== Other entrants ===
The following players received wildcards into the singles main draw:

- (Portugal) Pedro Araújo
- (Portugal) Frederico Ferreira Silva
- (Portugal) Francisco Rocha

The following player received entry into the singles main draw using a protected ranking:

- (Belgium) Kimmer Coppejans

The following players received entry into the singles main draw as alternates:

- (France) Gabriel Debru
- Ivan Gakhov
- (Italy) ~~Francesco Maestrelli~~
- (Spain) Daniel Mérida
- (Netherlands) Jelle Sels

The following players received entry from the qualifying draw:

- (Spain) Nicolás Álvarez Varona
- (Spain) Àlex Martí Pujolràs
- (Slovakia) Andrej Martin
- (Netherlands) Ryan Nijboer
- (Ukraine) Oleksandr Ovcharenko
- (Spain) Nikolás Sánchez Izquierdo

The following players received entry as lucky losers:

- (Lithuania) Vilius Gaubas
- (United Kingdom) Anton Matusevich

== Champions ==
=== Singles ===
- (Bosnia and Herzegovina) Damir Džumhur def. (Italy) Francesco Passaro 6–3, 6–4.

=== Doubles ===
- (France) Théo Arribagé / (Portugal) Francisco Cabral def. (Belgium) Kimmer Coppejans / (Spain) Sergio Martos Gornés 6–1, 3–6, [10–5].
