= Nuno Borges (tennis) =

Portuguese tennis player (born 1997)

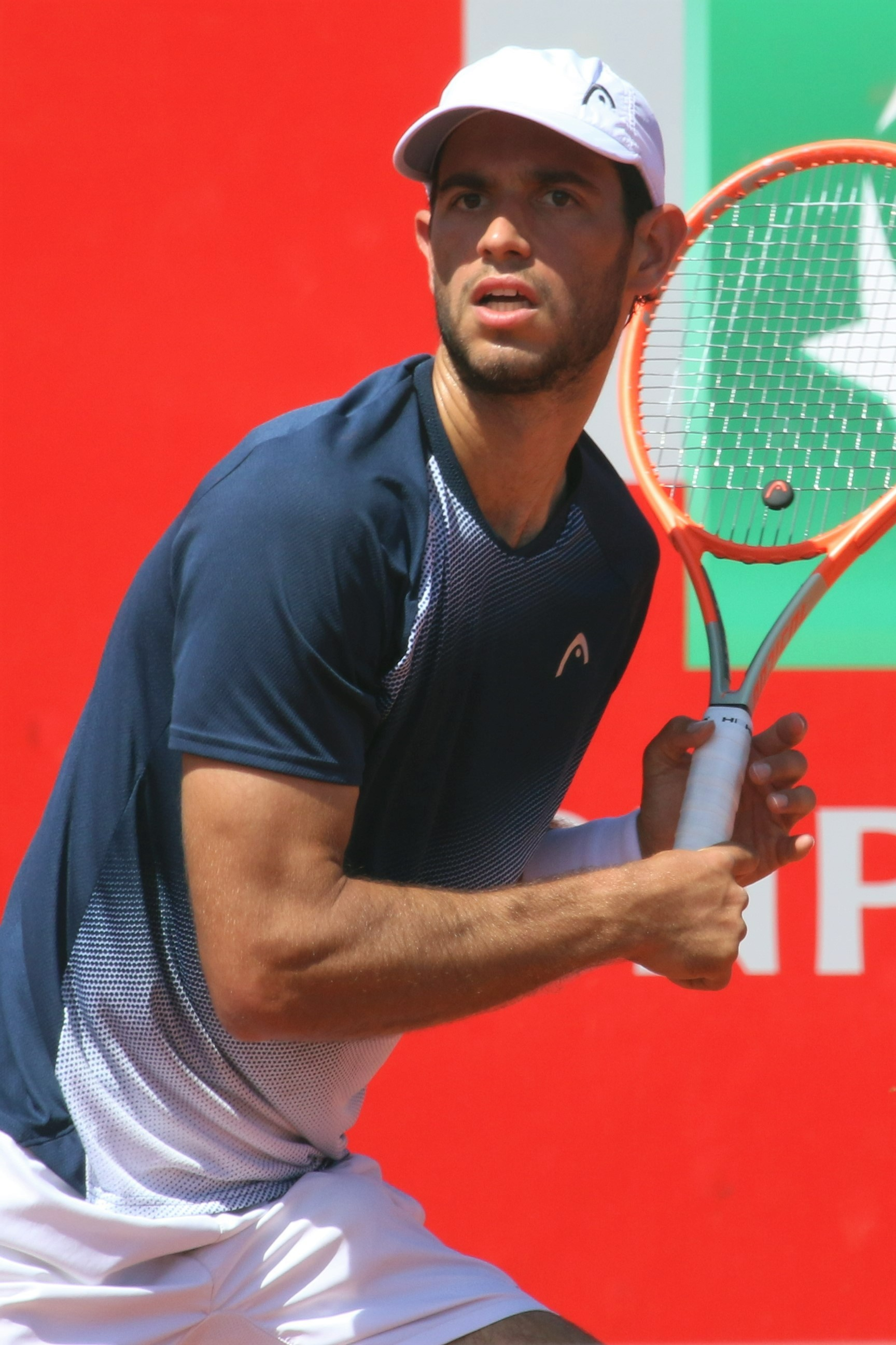
- Borges at the 2022 BNP Paribas Primrose Bordeaux
- Country (sports): Portugal
- Residence: Portugal
- Born: 19 February 1997 (age 29) Maia, Portugal
- Height: 1.85 m (6 ft 1 in)
- Turned pro: 2019
- Plays: Right-handed (two-handed backhand)
- College: Mississippi State
- Coach: Rui Machado, Hugo Anão
- Prize money: US $6,630,132

Singles
- Career record: 99–108
- Career titles: 1
- Highest ranking: No. 30 (9 September 2024)
- Current ranking: No. 41 (9 November 2026)

Grand Slam singles results
- Australian Open: 4R (2024)
- French Open: 3R (2025, 2026)
- Wimbledon: 3R (2025)
- US Open: 4R (2024)

Other tournaments
- Olympic Games: 1R (2024)

Doubles
- Career record: 33–36
- Career titles: 1
- Highest ranking: No. 69 (19 September 2022)
- Current ranking: No. 282 (31 August 2026)

Grand Slam doubles results
- Australian Open: QF (2025)
- French Open: 3R (2025)
- Wimbledon: 2R (2022, 2025)
- US Open: 3R (2024)

Other doubles tournaments
- Olympic Games: 2R (2024)

Team competitions
- Davis Cup: 4–3
- Last updated on: 31 August 2026.

Nuno Borges (Portuguese pronunciation: [ˈnunu ˈβɔɾʒɨʃ]; (Note: In isolation, Borges is pronounced [ˈbɔɾʒɨʃ].) born 19 February 1997) is a Portuguese professional tennis player. He has a career-high ATP singles ranking of world No. 30, achieved in September 2024, to become the second highest-ranked Portuguese player, after João Sousa (No. 28). He is currently the No. 1 singles player from Portugal. He also has a best a doubles ranking of No. 69, achieved in September 2022.

Borges won his first ATP singles title at the 2024 Swedish Open in Båstad, Sweden. In the final, he beat Rafael Nadal, becoming one of only five players (with Federer, Djokovic, Murray and Zeballos) to beat Nadal in a clay court final. He also has one title in doubles.

== Juniors ==
Borges had a combined ITF juniors ranking of world No. 44, achieved on 13 April 2015.

== US College career ==
Borges played US college tennis at Mississippi State University from 2015 to 2019 while graduating with a degree in Kinesiology. As a player of the Mississippi State Bulldogs he reached the NCAA singles final in 2019, was Intercollegiate Tennis Association National Player of the Year in 2019, and won the SEC Player of the Year Award three times (2017, 2018, 2019), having ranked #1 in both singles and doubles at the national level.

== Professional career ==
=== 2021–22: ATP debut, six Challenger doubles titles, top 100 in singles & doubles ===
Borges made his ATP debut at the 2021 Estoril Open after qualifying for the singles draw. He then defeated Jordan Thompson in the first round to win his first ATP match and lost against former US Open champion Marin Čilić in the second round. He repeated the same feat at the 2022 Estoril Open where he also reached the second round as a wildcard after Pablo Andújar retirement but lost to Frances Tiafoe.

Borges won two ATP Challenger singles and nine doubles titles with Francisco Cabral, a record doubles of six in 2021.

He reached the top 100 in doubles after winning his first ATP title at the 2022 Estoril Open with Francisco Cabral and where they defeated the top seeded pair Jamie Murray and Michael Venus en route. They became the first Portuguese pair to reach and win the final at their home tournament, and have done so on their ATP doubles debut.

At the 2022 French Open Borges qualified to make his Grand Slam main draw singles debut.

He also qualified for his second Grand Slam of the year at the 2022 Wimbledon Championships as a lucky loser after the late withdrawal of Marin Čilić. In doubles at the same tournament he reached the second round on his doubles Major debut partnering with Cabral.

He qualified for his third straight Grand Slam at the US Open defeating Francesco Maestrelli in a third set super tiebreak. He won his first round match against wildcard Ben Shelton. In doubles he reached the second round partnering again with Cabral. As a result, he moved into the top 100 in the singles rankings at world No. 93 and into the top 70 in doubles on 12 September 2022.

=== 2023: Australian Open, Masters debut and first win, top 75 ===
He made his debut at the 2023 Australian Open where he lost in the first round to Lorenzo Sonego.

At the 2023 Delray Beach Open he qualified for the main draw defeating Steve Johnson whom he defeated again in the first round. He lost in the second round to eventual runner-up Miomir Kecmanović.

He won his first title of the season at the 2023 Monterrey Challenger, Mexico defeating Borna Gojo in the final and reached the top 85. Borges created history by winning the first ATP Challenger 175 category at the Phoenix Challenger. After winning his biggest title of his career and second of the season, he reached the top 70. The following day he entered the qualifying competition at the 2023 Miami Open and won his two qualifying matches to make his Masters 1000 debut.

At the 2023 Italian Open, he earned his first Masters 1000 win over Dušan Lajović. His good form continued at the 2023 French Open where he defeated John Isner for his first win at this Major.

=== 2024: Historic Australian fourth round, win over Nadal & clay title, top 30 ===
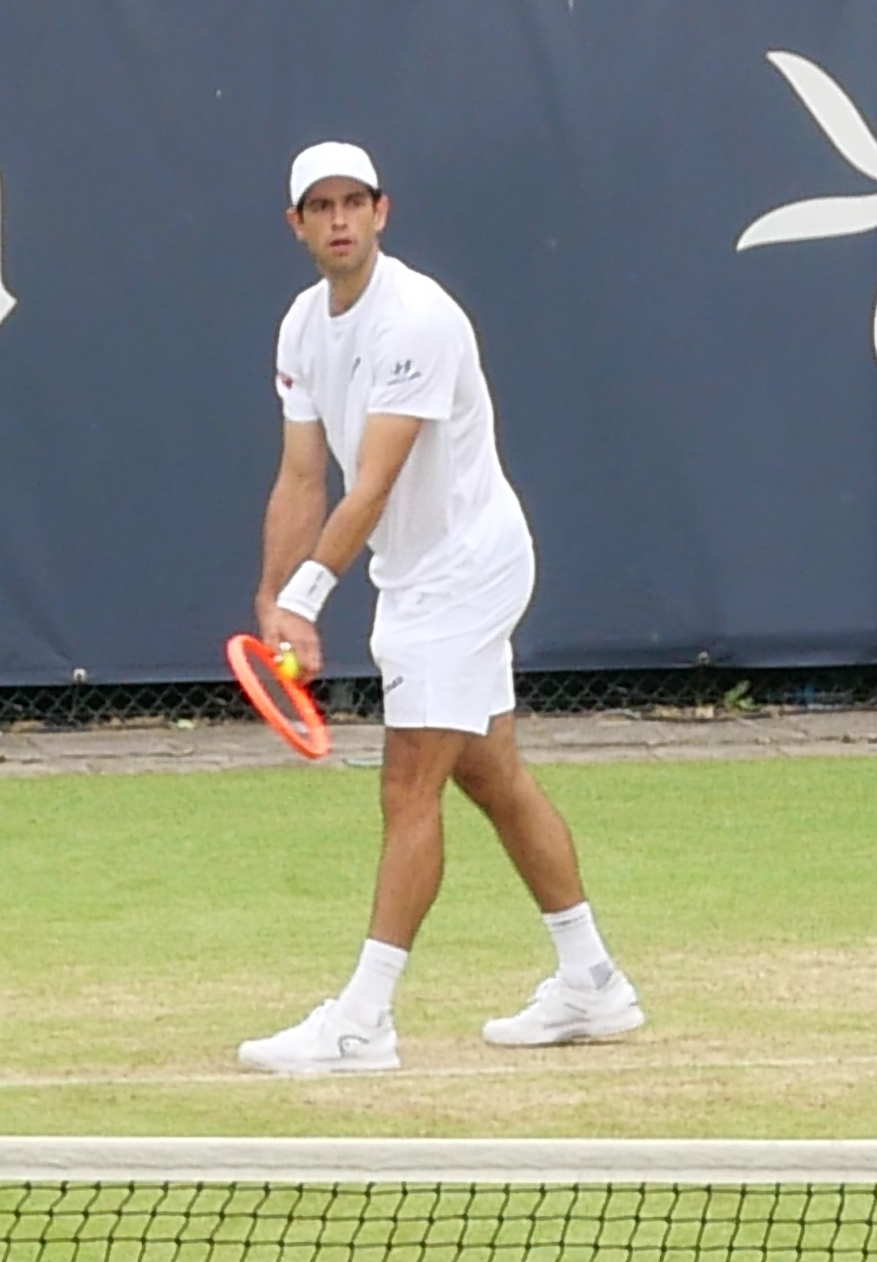
Borges at the 2026 Libéma Open

He reached the fourth round of a Major for the first time in his career at the 2024 Australian Open defeating Maximilian Marterer, 23rd seed Alejandro Davidovich Fokina and 13th seed Grigor Dimitrov, his first top 20 win, becoming the first Portuguese player to reach the fourth round of either singles draw at this Major. He was also just the second Portuguese player to reach the second week of a Grand Slam after João Sousa. He lost to Daniil Medvedev in four sets. As a result he became the second Portuguese tennis player to break into the top 50 of the ATP rankings. He defended his Challenger 175 category title at the 2024 Arizona Tennis Classic beating former world #6 Matteo Berrettini in the final.

Borges reached his first ATP Tour final at the Swedish Open, defeating Thiago Agustín Tirante in the semifinals to set up a meeting with 22-time Grand Slam champion, Rafael Nadal. Borges defeated the Spaniard in straight sets to win his first ATP title, making him the ninth first-time ATP Tour champion for 2024 and the fifth man to beat Nadal in a clay court final (the others being the rest of the Big Four and Horacio Zeballos).

At the 2024 National Bank Open he defeated Miomir Kecmanović and upset 12th seed Ugo Humbert. As a result he reached the top 40 in the rankings on 12 August 2024. Ranked No. 39, he qualified for the next Masters, the 2024 Cincinnati Open and defeated Adrian Mannarino. As a result he moved into the top 35 in the rankings on 19 August 2024. At the US Open he reached the third round for the first time at this Major, with wins over Federico Coria and Thanasi Kokkinakis.

=== 2025–26: Masters quarterfinal ===
At the 2026 Paris Masters he reached his first Masters 1000 quarterfinal defeating Ignacio Buse and became the first lucky loser to reach that stage at the event.

== Endorsements ==
Nuno Borges wears HEAD clothing and shoes and plays with a HEAD Radical racquet in a pro stock TGT 307 edition based on the Graphene Radical. Borges has been sponsored by HEAD and a regular feature of its #teamHEAD activities.

Since May 2023 Nuno Borges is a brand ambassador for Hyundai Portugal and for the Portuguese bank Millennium BCP since January 2025.

== Performance timelines ==
Key
W	F	SF	QF	#R	RR	Q#	P#	DNQ	A	Z#	PO	G	S	B	NMS	NTI	P	NH

(W) winner; (F) finalist; (SF) semifinalist; (QF) quarterfinalist; (#R) rounds 4, 3, 2, 1; (RR) round-robin stage; (Q#) qualification round; (P#) preliminary round; (DNQ) did not qualify; (A) absent; (Z#) Davis/Fed Cup Zonal Group (with number indication) or (PO) play-off; (G) gold, (S) silver or (B) bronze Olympic/Paralympic medal; (NMS) not a Masters tournament; (NTI) not a Tier I tournament; (P) postponed; (NH) not held; (SR) strike rate (events won / competed); (W–L) win–loss record.
To avoid confusion and double counting, these charts are updated at the conclusion of a tournament or when the player's participation has ended.

Tournament	2021	2022	2023	2024	2025	2026	SR	W–L	Win%
Grand Slam tournaments
Australian Open	A	A	1R	4R	3R	3R	0 / 4	7–4	64%
French Open	A	1R	2R	1R	3R	3R	0 / 5	5–5	50%
Wimbledon	A	1R	1R	1R	3R	2R	0 / 5	3–5	38%
US Open	A	2R	1R	4R	2R	1R	0 / 5	5–5	50%
Win–loss	0–0	1–3	1–4	6–4	7–4	5–4	0 / 19	20–19	51%
Year-end Championships
ATP Finals	did not qualify						0 / 0	0–0	–
National representation
Summer Olympics	A	NH		1R	NH		0 / 1	0–1	0%
ATP Tour Masters 1000
Indian Wells Open	A	A	Q1	1R	2R	2R	0 / 3	2–3	40%
Miami Open	A	A	1R	1R	1R	1R	0 / 4	0–4	0%
Monte-Carlo Masters	A	A	A	A	3R	1R	0 / 2	2–2	50%
Madrid Open	A	A	1R	1R	2R	1R	0 / 4	1–4	20%
Italian Open	A	A	2R	4R	1R	2R	0 / 4	5–4	56%
Canadian Open	A	A	A	3R	3R	4R	0 / 3	6–3	67%
Cincinnati Open	A	A	Q1	2R	1R	3R	0 / 3	3–3	50%
Shanghai Masters	Not Held		1R	A	4R	2R	0 / 3	4–3	57%
Paris Masters	A	A	A	1R	1R	QF	0 / 3	3–3	50%
Win–loss	0–0	0–0	1–4	6–7	8–9	12–9	0 / 29	27–29	48%
Career statistics
	2021	2022	2023	2024	2025	2026	Career		
Tournaments	1	6	17	25	28	26	total: 103		
Titles	0	0	0	1	0	0	total: 1		
Finals	0	0	0	1	0	0	total: 1		
Overall win–loss	1–1	6–6	9–18	24–25	30–31	32–28	1 / 103	102–109	
Win %	50%	50%	33%	49%	49%	52%	total: 48.34%		
Year-end ranking	194	112	66	36	47	41	$4,319,236		

== ATP Tour finals ==
=== Singles: 1 (title) ===
Legend Grand Slam (–) ATP 1000 (–) ATP 500 (–) ATP 250 (1–0)	Finals by surface Hard (–) Clay (1–0) Grass (–)	Finals by setting Outdoor (1–0) Indoor (–)

Result	W–L	Date	Tournament	Tier	Surface	Opponent	Score
Win	1–0	Jul 2024	Swedish Open, Sweden	ATP 250	Clay	(Spain) Rafael Nadal	6–3, 6–2

=== Doubles: 1 (title) ===
Legend Grand Slam (–) ATP 1000 (–) ATP 500 (–) ATP 250 (1–0)	Finals by surface Hard (–) Clay (1–0) Grass (–)	Finals by setting Outdoor (1–0) Indoor (–)

Result	W–L	Date	Tournament	Tier	Surface	Partner	Opponents	Score
Win	1–0	Apr 2022	Estoril Open, Portugal	ATP 250	Clay	(Portugal) Francisco Cabral	(Argentina) Máximo González (Sweden) André Göransson	6–2, 6–3

== ATP Challenger Tour finals ==
=== Singles: 10 (6 titles, 4 runner-ups) ===
Legend ATP Challenger Tour (6–4)	Finals by surface Hard (3–1) Clay (3–3)

Result	W–L	Date	Tournament	Tier	Surface	Opponent	Score
Loss	0–1	Apr 2021	Open de Oeiras II, Portugal	Challenger	Clay	(Argentina) Pedro Cachín	6–7^{(4–7)}, 6–7^{(3–7)}
Win	1–1	Nov 2021	Antalya Challenger III, Turkey	Challenger	Clay	(United Kingdom) Ryan Peniston	6–4, 6–3
Loss	1–2	Dec 2021	Maia Challenger II, Portugal	Challenger	Clay (i)	(Chinese Taipei) Tseng Chun-hsin	7–5, 5–7, 2–6
Loss	1–3	Mar 2022	Challenger di Roseto degli Abruzzi, Italy	Challenger	Clay	(Spain) Carlos Taberner	2–6, 3–6
Win	2–3	Apr 2022	Open della Disfida, Italy	Challenger	Clay	(Serbia) Miljan Zekić	6–3, 7–5
Win	3–3	Feb 2023	Monterrey Challenger, Mexico	Challenger	Hard	(Croatia) Borna Gojo	6–4, 7–6^{(8–6)}
Win	4–3	Mar 2023	Arizona Tennis Classic, US	Challenger	Hard	Alexander Shevchenko	4–6, 6–2, 6–1
Loss	4–4	Oct 2023	Shenzhen Longhua Open, China	Challenger	Hard	(United States) Aleksandar Kovacevic	6–7^{(4–7)}, 6–7^{(5–7)}
Win	5–4	Dec 2023	Maia Challenger, Portugal	Challenger	Clay (i)	(France) Benoît Paire	6–1, 6–4
Win	6–4	Mar 2024	Arizona Tennis Classic, US (2)	Challenger	Hard	(Italy) Matteo Berrettini	7–5, 7–6^{(7–4)}

=== Doubles: 14 (9 titles, 5 runner-ups) ===
Legend ATP Challenger Tour (9–5)	Finals by surface Hard (2–1) Clay (7–4)

Result	W–L	Date	Tournament	Tier	Surface	Partner	Opponents	Score
Win	1–0	Apr 2021	Open de Oeiras II, Portugal	Challenger	Clay	(Portugal) Francisco Cabral	(Russia) Pavel Kotov (Chinese Taipei) Tseng Chun-hsin	6–1, 6–2
Win	2–0	Sep 2021	Braga Open, Portugal	Challenger	Clay	(Portugal) Francisco Cabral	(Netherlands) Jesper de Jong (Netherlands) Bart Stevens	6–3, 6–7^{(4–7)}, [10–5]
Loss	2–1	Oct 2021	Lisboa Belém Open, Portugal	Challenger	Clay	(Portugal) Francisco Cabral	(India) Jeevan Nedunchezhiyan (India) Purav Raja	6–7^{(5–7)}, 3–6
Loss	2–2	Oct 2021	Sánchez-Casal Cup, Spain	Challenger	Clay	(Portugal) Francisco Cabral	(Finland) Harri Heliövaara (Czech Republic) Roman Jebavý	4–6, 3–6
Win	3–2	Nov 2021	Tenerife Challenger, Spain	Challenger	Hard	(Portugal) Francisco Cabral	(India) Jeevan Nedunchezhiyan (India) Purav Raja	6–3, 6–4
Win	4–2	Nov 2021	Bahrain M.I. Tennis Challenger, Bahrain	Challenger	Hard	(Portugal) Francisco Cabral	(Austria) Maximilian Neuchrist (Greece) Michail Pervolarakis	7–5, 6–7^{(5–7)}, [10–8]
Win	5–2	Dec 2021	Maia Challenger, Portugal	Challenger	Clay (i)	(Portugal) Francisco Cabral	(Slovakia) Andrej Martin (Portugal) Gonçalo Oliveira	6–3, 6–4
Win	6–2	Dec 2021	Maia Challenger II, Portugal	Challenger	Clay (i)	(Portugal) Francisco Cabral	(Poland) Piotr Matuszewski (Austria) David Pichler	6–4, 7–5
Win	7–2	Mar 2022	Open de Oeiras, Portugal	Challenger	Clay	(Portugal) Francisco Cabral	(Uzbekistan) Sanjar Fayziev (Greece) Markos Kalovelonis	6–3, 6–0
Win	8–2	Apr 2022	Open de Oeiras II, Portugal (2)	Challenger	Clay	(Portugal) Francisco Cabral	(Czech Republic) Zdeněk Kolář (Czech Republic) Adam Pavlásek	6–4, 6–0
Win	9–2	May 2022	Prague Open, Czech Republic	Challenger	Clay	(Portugal) Francisco Cabral	(Czech Republic) Andrew Paulson (Czech Republic) Adam Pavlásek	6–4, 6–7^{(3–7)}, [10–5]
Loss	9–3	Jul 2022	Porto Challenger, Portugal	Challenger	Hard	(Portugal) Francisco Cabral	(India) Yuki Bhambri (India) Saketh Myneni	4–6, 6–3, [6–10]
Loss	9–4	Nov 2022	Maia Challenger, Portugal	Challenger	Clay (i)	(Portugal) Francisco Cabral	(United Kingdom) Julian Cash (United Kingdom) Henry Patten	3–6, 6–3, [8–10]
Loss	9–5	May 2023	Open Aix Provence, France	Challenger	Clay	(Portugal) Francisco Cabral	(Australia) Jason Kubler (Australia) John Peers	7–6^{(7–5)}, 4–6, [7–10]

== ITF Tour finals ==
=== Singles: 18 (10 titles, 8 runner-ups) ===
Legend ITF Futures/WTT (10–8)	Finals by surface Hard (7–7) Clay (3–1)

Result	W–L	Date	Tournament	Tier	Surface	Opponent	Score
Loss	0–1	Jun 2017	Portugal F8, Lisbon	Futures	Hard	(Portugal) João Monteiro	4–6, 6–1, 5–7
Win	1–1	Jul 2017	Portugal F9, Setúbal	Futures	Hard	(Portugal) João Monteiro	6–3, 6–0
Win	2–1	Jul 2017	Portugal F13, Idanha-a-Nova	Futures	Hard	(Spain) Andrés Artuñedo	7–6^{(7–4)}, 6–4
Loss	2–2	Jun 2018	Portugal F8, Póvoa de Varzim	Futures	Hard	(Chinese Taipei) Tseng Chun-hsin	3–6, 4–6
Loss	2–3	Jul 2018	Portugal F11, Castelo Branco	Futures	Hard	(United Kingdom) Mark Whitehouse	4–6, 4–6
Loss	2–4	Jul 2018	Portugal F12, Porto	Futures	Hard	(Hungary) Máté Valkusz	3–6, 2–6
Win	3–4	Aug 2018	Portugal F13, Caldas da Rainha	Futures	Clay	(Portugal) Daniel Batista	6–0, 6–2
Win	4–4	Nov 2018	USA F32, Pensacola	Futures	Clay	(Venezuela) Ricardo Rodríguez	6–4, 6–3
Win	5–4	Jun 2019	M15 Setúbal, Portugal	WTT	Hard	(Portugal) Frederico Gil	6–3, 6–4
Win	6–4	Jul 2019	M15 Idanha-a-Nova, Portugal	WTT	Hard	(Portugal) Frederico Gil	3–6, 6–3, 6–2
Win	7–4	Jan 2020	M15 Monastir, Tunisia	WTT	Hard	(Belgium) Zizou Bergs	6–4, 7–6^{(8–6)}
Win	8–4	Sep 2020	M15 Sintra, Portugal	WTT	Hard	(Portugal) Gastão Elias	6–2, 6–2
Loss	8–5	Oct 2020	M25 Porto, Portugal	WTT	Hard	(Portugal) Gastão Elias	3–6, 3–6
Loss	8–6	Oct 2020	M15 Setúbal, Portugal	WTT	Hard	(Germany) Sebastian Fanselow	4–6, 6–7^{(3–7)}
Loss	8–7	Nov 2020	M25 Vale do Lobo, Portugal	WTT	Hard	(Poland) Kacper Żuk	4–6, 3–6
Win	9–7	Nov 2020	M15 Quinta do Lago, Portugal	WTT	Hard	(Belgium) Michael Geerts	6–0, 6–1
Win	10–7	Feb 2021	M15 Antalya, Turkey	WTT	Clay	(Serbia) Miljan Zekić	6–4, 3–3 ret.
Loss	10–8	May 2021	M15 Majadahonda, Spain	WTT	Clay	(Switzerland) Johan Nikles	4–6, 3–6

=== Doubles: 12 (7 titles, 5 runner-ups) ===
Legend ITF Futures/WTT (7–5)	Finals by surface Hard (6–2) Clay (1–3)

Result	W–L	Date	Tournament	Tier	Surface	Partner	Opponents	Score
Loss	0–1	Nov 2015	Morocco F4, Casablanca	Futures	Clay	(Portugal) Francisco Cabral	(Morocco) Amine Ahouda (Morocco) Yassine Idmbarek	2–6, 6–1, [8–10]
Win	1–1	Jun 2017	Portugal F8, Lisbon	Futures	Hard	(Portugal) Francisco Cabral	(Republic of Ireland) Sam Barry (Australia) Bradley Mousley	6–1, 3–6, [10–5]
Win	2–1	Jul 2017	Portugal F9, Setúbal	Futures	Hard	(Portugal) Francisco Cabral	(Australia) Harry Bourchier (Australia) Daniel Nolan	7–6^{(7–4)}, 6–4
Win	3–1	Jun 2018	Portugal F9, Póvoa de Varzim	Futures	Hard	(Portugal) Francisco Cabral	(France) Romain Bauvy (France) Hugo Voljacques	6–4, 6–4
Loss	3–2	Jun 2018	Portugal F10, Setúbal	Futures	Hard	(Portugal) Francisco Cabral	(Guatemala) Christopher Díaz Figueroa (Guatemala) Wilfredo González	5–7, 6–2, [8–10]
Win	4–2	Jul 2018	Portugal F11, Castelo Branco	Futures	Hard	(Portugal) Francisco Cabral	(France) Maxime Tchoutakian (France) Hugo Voljacques	6–4, 6–4
Win	5–2	Jul 2019	M15 Idanha-a-Nova, Portugal	WTT	Hard	(Portugal) Francisco Cabral	(Portugal) Francisco Dias (Portugal) Gonçalo Falcão	6–4, 6–3
Win	6–2	Oct 2020	M15 Setúbal, Portugal	WTT	Hard	(Portugal) Francisco Cabral	(Brazil) Mateus Alves (Brazil) Igor Marcondes	6–2, 6–7^{(5–7)}, [10–7]
Loss	6–3	Oct 2020	M25 Vale do Lobo, Portugal	WTT	Hard	(Portugal) Francisco Cabral	(Netherlands) Jesper de Jong (Netherlands) Jelle Sels	6–7^{(3–7)}, 7–5, [8–10]
Loss	6–4	Nov 2020	M15 Villena, Spain	WTT	Clay	(Portugal) Francisco Cabral	(Spain) Benjamín Winter López (Spain) Alberto Barroso Campos	5–7, 5–7
Loss	6–5	Jan 2021	M15 Antalya, Turkey	WTT	Clay	(United States) Alex Rybakov	(Italy) Davide Galoppini (Italy) Raúl Brancaccio	6–2, 4–6, [7–10]
Win	7–5	Feb 2021	M15 Antalya, Turkey	WTT	Clay	(United States) Alex Rybakov	(Italy) Jacopo Berrettini (Italy) Raúl Brancaccio	4–6, 7–6^{(7–1)}, [10–6]

== Best Grand Slam results details ==
=== Singles ===
	Australian Open			
2024 Australian Open
Round	Opponent	Rank	Score	NBR
1R	(Germany) Maximilian Marterer	No. 96	7–5, 7–6^{(7–3)}, 6–2	No. 69
2R	(Spain) Alejandro Davidovich Fokina (23)	No. 24	7–6^{(9–7)}, 6–3, 6–3	No. 69
3R	(Bulgaria) Grigor Dimitrov (13)	No. 13	6–7^{(3–7)}, 6–4, 6–2, 7–6^{(8–6)}	No. 69
4R	Daniil Medvedev (3)	No. 3	3–6, 6–7^{(4–7)}, 7–5, 1–6	No. 69

	French Open			
2025 French Open
Round	Opponent	Rank	Score	NBR
1R	(France) Kyrian Jacquet (Q)	No. 150	3–6, 6–7^{(3–7)}, 6–4, 6–3, 6–3	No. 41
2R	(Norway) Casper Ruud (7)	No. 8	2–6, 6–4, 6–1, 6–0	No. 41
3R	(Australia) Alexei Popyrin (25)	No. 25	4–6, 6–7^{(11–13)}, 6–7^{(5–7)}	No. 41
2026 French Open
Round	Opponent	Rank	Score	NBR
1R	(Argentina) Tomás Martín Etcheverry (23)	No. 28	6–3, 6–4, 6–2	No. 51
2R	(Serbia) Miomir Kecmanović	No. 48	3–6, 6–2, 6–1, 6–2	No. 51
3R	Andrey Rublev (11)	No. 13	5–7, 6–7^{(2–7)}, 6–7^{(2–7)}	No. 51

	Wimbledon Championships			
2025 Wimbledon
Round	Opponent	Rank	Score	NBR
1R	(Argentina) Francisco Cerúndolo (16)	No. 19	4–6, 6–3, 7–6^{(7–5)}, 6–0	No. 37
2R	(United Kingdom) Billy Harris	No. 151	6–3, 6–4, 7–6^{(9–7)}	No. 37
3R	Karen Khachanov (17)	No. 20	6–7^{(6–8)}, 6–4, 6–4, 3–6, 6–7^{(8–10)}	No. 37

	US Open			
2024 US Open
Round	Opponent	Rank	Score	NBR
1R	(Argentina) Federico Coria	No. 79	6–2, 6–4, 6–1	No. 34
2R	(Australia) Thanasi Kokkinakis	No. 86	6–4, 7–5, 7–5	No. 34
3R	(Czech Republic) Jakub Menšík	No. 65	6–7^{(5–7)}, 6–1, 3–6, 7–6^{(8–6)}, 6–0	No. 34
4R	Daniil Medvedev (5)	No. 5	0–6, 1–6, 3–6	No. 34

=== Doubles ===
	Australian Open			
2025 Australian Open
with (Portugal) Francisco Cabral
Round	Opponents	Rank	Score	NBR
1R	(Croatia) Nikola Mektić (5) (New Zealand) Michael Venus (5)	No. 8 No. 17	7–6^{(7–3)}, 6–3	No. 252
2R	(India) Sriram Balaji (Mexico) Miguel Ángel Reyes-Varela	No. 65; No. 59	7–6^{(7–1)}, 4–6, 6–3	No. 252
3R	(Netherlands) Tallon Griekspoor (Netherlands) Botic van de Zandschulp	No. 143; No. 193	7–6^{(7–5)}, 3–6, 6–3	No. 252
QF	(Italy) Simone Bolelli (3) (Italy) Andrea Vavassori (3)	No. 6 No. 7	4–6, 6–7^{(4–7)}	No. 252

	French Open			
2025 French Open
with (France) Arthur Rinderknech
Round	Opponents	Rank	Score	NBR
1R	(Belgium) Zizou Bergs (Netherlands) Jesper de Jong	No. 577; No. 305	3–6, 6–2, 6–3	No. 101
2R	(Sweden) André Göransson (12) (Netherlands) Sem Verbeek (12)	No. 27; No. 31	6–3, 6–2	No. 101
3R	(United Kingdom) Joe Salisbury (8) (United Kingdom) Neal Skupski (8)	No. 20; No. 15	6–7^{(5–7)}, 4–6	No. 101

	Wimbledon Championships			
2022 Wimbledon
with (Portugal) Francisco Cabral
Round	Opponents	Rank	Score	NBR
1R	(Philippines) Treat Huey (PR) (Croatia) Franko Škugor (PR)	No. 108; No. 185	7–6^{(13–11)}, 3–6, 5–7, 6–3, 6–2	No. 90
2R	(Colombia) Juan Sebastián Cabal (6) (Colombia) Robert Farah (6)	No. 12; No. 12	5–7, 4–6, 2–6	No. 90
2025 Wimbledon
with (United States) Marcos Giron
Round	Opponents	Rank	Score	NBR
1R	(Netherlands) Robin Haase (Netherlands) Jean-Julien Rojer	No. 75; No. 77	7–6^{(8–6)}, 6–1	No. 88
2R	(India) Yuki Bhambri (16) (United States) Robert Galloway (16)	No. 35; No. 37	3–6, 6–7^{(6–8)}	No. 88

	US Open			
2024 US Open
with (Portugal) Francisco Cabral
Round	Opponents	Rank	Score	NBR
1R	(Belgium) Zizou Bergs (Hungary) Fábián Marozsán	No. 626; No. 545	7–6^{(8–6)}, 6–2	No. 346
2R	(Monaco) Hugo Nys (12) (Poland) Jan Zieliński (12)	No. 24; No. 25	7–6^{(7–5)}, 6–4	No. 346
3R	(Australia) Max Purcell (7) (Australia) Jordan Thompson (7)	No. 18; No. 13	6–7^{(3–7)}, 3–6	No. 346

== National and international representation ==
=== Davis Cup: 12 (6–6) ===
Group membership World Group (0–0) Qualifying Round (1–3) WG Play-off (0–0) Group I (5–3) Group II (0–0) Group III (0–0) Group IV (0–0)	Matches by surface Hard (3–5) Clay (3–1) Grass (0–0) Carpet (0–0)	Matches by type Singles (4–2) Doubles (2–4)

- ▲ ▼ indicates the outcome of the Davis Cup match followed by the score, date, place of event, the zonal classification and its phase, and the court surface.

Rubber outcome	No.	Rubber	Match type (partner if any)	Opponent nation	Opponent player(s)	Score
▼1–3; 18–19 September 2021; Horia Demian Sports Hall, Cluj-Napoca, Romania; World Group I first round; hard (indoor) surface
Defeat	1	III	Doubles (with João Sousa)	Romania	Marius Copil / Horia Tecău	4–6, 3–6
▲4–0; 4–5 March 2022; Complexo Municipal de Ténis, Maia, Portugal; World Group I play-off; clay surface
Victory	2	II	Singles	Poland	Kamil Majchrzak	3–6, 6–4, 6–3
Victory	3	III	Doubles (with Francisco Cabral)	Poland	Szymon Walków / Jan Zieliński	3–6, 6–3, 6–4
▲3–1; 16–17 September 2022; Centro Cultural de Viana do Castelo, Viana do Castelo, Portugal; World Group I first round; hard (indoor) surface
Victory	4	II	Singles	Brazil	Thiago Monteiro	6–7^{(5–7)}, 6–4, 7–6^{(7–3)}
Defeat	5	III	Doubles (with Francisco Cabral)	Brazil	Rafael Matos / Felipe Meligeni Alves	3–6, 6–0, 3–6
▼1–3; 4–5 February 2023; Complexo Municipal de Ténis, Maia, Portugal; Davis Cup qualifying round; clay (indoor) surface
Defeat	6	I	Singles	Czech Republic	Jiří Lehečka	4–6, 4–6
Victory	7	III	Doubles (with Francisco Cabral)	Czech Republic	Tomáš Macháč / Adam Pavlásek	7–5, 7–6^{(7–4)}
▲3–1; 15–16 September 2023; Multiversum, Schwechat, Austria; World Group I first round; hard (indoor) surface
Victory	8	I	Singles	Austria	Jurij Rodionov	7–6^{(7–4)}, 3–6, 6–3
Defeat	9	III	Doubles (with Francisco Cabral)	Austria	Alexander Erler / Lucas Miedler	6–7^{(0–7)}, 6–7^{(5–7)}
Victory	10	IV	Singles	Austria	Dennis Novak	6–2, 6–2
▼1–3; 2–3 February 2024; Gatorade Center, Turku, Finland; Davis Cup qualifying round; hard (indoor) surface
Defeat	11	I	Singles	Finland	Otto Virtanen	2–6, 1–6
Defeat	12	III	Doubles (with Francisco Cabral)	Finland	Harri Heliövaara / Emil Ruusuvuori	4–6, 6–7^{(6–8)}

== Wins over top 10 players ==
- Borges has a 2–16 (11.11%) record against players who were, at the time the match was played, ranked in the top 10.

Season	2025	2026	Total
Wins	1	1	2

#	Player	Rk	Event	Surface	Rd	Score	Rk	Ref
2025
1.	(Norway) Casper Ruud	8	French Open, France	Clay	2R	2–6, 6–4, 6–1, 6–0	41	
2026
2.	(Canada) Félix Auger-Aliassime	8	Australian Open, Australia	Hard	1R	3–6, 6–4, 6–4, ret.	46	

- Key: (Rk) first use, opponent rank; (Rd) round; (Rk) 2nd use, player rank; (Ref) reference; (F) final; (SF) semifinal; (QF) quarterfinal; (#R) rounds 4, 3, 2, 1; (RR) round-robin stage; (Q#) qualifying rounds or stages (3), 2, 1.

*As of 19 January 2026

== Notes ==
Sporting positions
Preceded by (Ecuador) Diego Hidalgo	SEC Tennis Player of the Year; 2017–2019	Succeeded by (France) Valentin Vacherot
