= Maia Challenger =

Maia Open
- 2026 Maia Open

ATP Challenger Tour
- Location: Maia, Portugal
- Venue: Complexo Municipal de Ténis da Maia
- Category: ATP Challenger 100 (2023-)
- Surface: Clay, Indoor
- Draw: 48S/4Q/16D
- Website: Tenis.pt

The Maia Open is a professional tennis tournament played on clay courts. It is currently part of the ATP Challenger Tour. It is held annually in Maia, Portugal since 2019. The event is a Challenger 100 since 2023.

== Past finals ==
=== Singles ===
Year	Champion	Runner-up	Score
2026	(Italy) Francesco Passaro	(Hungary) Zsombor Piros	4–6, 6–3, 6–2
2025	(Denmark) Elmer Møller	(Slovakia) Andrej Martin	6–4, 6–1
2024	(Bosnia and Herzegovina) Damir Džumhur	(Italy) Francesco Passaro	6–3, 6–4
2023	(Portugal) Nuno Borges	(France) Benoît Paire	6–1, 6–4
2022	(France) Luca Van Assche	(Austria) Maximilian Neuchrist	3–6, 6–4, 6–0
2021 (2)	(Chinese Taipei) Tseng Chun-hsin	(Portugal) Nuno Borges	5–7, 7–5, 6–2
2021 (1)	(France) Geoffrey Blancaneaux	(Chinese Taipei) Tseng Chun-hsin	3–6, 6–3, 6–2
2020	(Portugal) Pedro Sousa	(Spain) Carlos Taberner	6–0, 5–7, 6–2
2019	(Slovakia) Jozef Kovalík	(France) Constant Lestienne	6–0, 6–4

=== Doubles ===
Year	Champions	Runners-up	Score
2026	(Slovakia) Miloš Karol (Czech Republic) Andrew Paulson	(Portugal) Tiago Pereira (Spain) Benjamín Winter López	4–6, 6–1, [11–9]
2025	(Bulgaria) Alexander Donski (Portugal) Tiago Pereira	(France) Théo Arribagé (Croatia) Nino Serdarušić	6–2, 7–6^{(8–6)}
2024	(France) Théo Arribagé (Portugal) Francisco Cabral	(Belgium) Kimmer Coppejans (Spain) Sergio Martos Gornés	6–1, 3–6, [10–5]
2023	(Italy) Marco Bortolotti (Italy) Andrea Vavassori	(Brazil) Fernando Romboli (Poland) Szymon Walków	6–4, 3–6, [12–10]
2022	(United Kingdom) Julian Cash (United Kingdom) Henry Patten	(Portugal) Nuno Borges (Portugal) Francisco Cabral	6–3, 3–6, [10–8]
2021 (2)	(Portugal) Nuno Borges (Portugal) Francisco Cabral	(Poland) Piotr Matuszewski (Austria) David Pichler	6–4, 7–5
2021 (1)	(Portugal) Nuno Borges (Portugal) Francisco Cabral	(Slovakia) Andrej Martin (Portugal) Gonçalo Oliveira	6–3, 6–4
2020	(Czech Republic) Zdeněk Kolář (Italy) Andrea Vavassori	(United Kingdom) Lloyd Glasspool (Finland) Harri Heliövaara	6–3, 6–4
2019	(Germany) Andre Begemann (Germany) Daniel Masur	(Spain) Guillermo García López (Spain) David Vega Hernández	7–6^{(7–2)}, 6–4
