= 2022 Open de Oeiras II – Singles =

Singles
- 2022 Open de Oeiras II

Final
- Champion: (Portugal) Gastão Elias
- Runner-up: (Italy) Alessandro Giannessi
- Score: 7–6^{(7–4)}, 6–1

Events
Singles	Doubles
← 2022 ·	Open de Oeiras	· 2022 →

Gastão Elias was the two-time defending champion and successfully defended his title, defeating Alessandro Giannessi 7–6^{(7–4)}, 6–1 in the final.

== Seeds ==
1. (Brazil) Thiago Monteiro (first round)
2. (Czech Republic) Zdeněk Kolář (semifinals)
3. (Portugal) Nuno Borges (second round)
4. (Australia) Christopher O'Connell (quarterfinals)
5. (Italy) Alessandro Giannessi (final)
6. (Kazakhstan) Dmitry Popko (second round)
7. (Slovakia) Jozef Kovalík (semifinals)
8. (Bulgaria) Dimitar Kuzmanov (quarterfinals)

== Draw ==
=== Key ===
- Q = Qualifier
- WC = Wild card
- LL = Lucky loser
- Alt = Alternate
- SE = Special exempt
- PR = Protected ranking
- ITF = ITF entry
- JE = Junior exempt
- w/o = Walkover
- r = Retired
- d = Defaulted
- SR = Special ranking

=== Finals ===
Semifinals
7	(Slovakia) Jozef Kovalík	6	4	5
5	(Italy) Alessandro Giannessi	2	6	7
(Portugal) Gastão Elias	2	6	6
2	(Czech Republic) Zdeněk Kolář	6	2	1

Final
5	(Italy) Alessandro Giannessi	6^{4}	1
(Portugal) Gastão Elias	7^{7}	6

=== Top half ===
First round
1	(Brazil) T Monteiro	4	5
(Poland) K Żuk	6	7
(Kazakhstan) T Skatov	6^{5}	6^{5}
(Czech Republic) L Rosol	7^{7}	7^{7}
(France) E Furness	7^{9}	6
WC	(Portugal) Pedro Araújo	6^{7}	3
Q	(Turkey) E Kırkın	2	3
7	(Slovakia) J Kovalík	6	6
4	(Australia) C O'Connell	4	6	6
(Croatia) N Serdarušić	6	3	2
(France) T Lamasine	6	2	7^{7}
Q	(United States) A Rybakov	3	6	6^{5}
Q	(Hungary) F Marozsán	6	6
(Kazakhstan) D Yevseyev	2	3
(Italy) L Darderi	6	6^{5}	1
5	(Italy) A Giannessi	4	7^{7}	6

Second round
(Poland) K Żuk	4	3
(Czech Republic) L Rosol	6	6
(France) E Furness	6^{5}	2
7	(Slovakia) J Kovalík	7^{7}	6
4	(Australia) C O'Connell	6	6
(France) T Lamasine	3	4
Q	(Hungary) F Marozsán	7	6^{4}	4
5	(Italy) A Giannessi	5	7^{7}	6

Quarterfinals
(Czech Republic) L Rosol	6^{6}	2
7	(Slovakia) J Kovalík	7^{8}	6
4	(Australia) C O'Connell	4	4
5	(Italy) A Giannessi	6	6

Semifinals
7	(Slovakia) J Kovalík	6	4	5
5	(Italy) A Giannessi	2	6	7

=== Bottom half ===
First round
6	(Kazakhstan) D Popko	6	3	6
(Czech Republic) D Svrčina	4	6	4
(Hungary) Z Piros	6	6
WC	(Portugal) J Domingues	3	3
(Germany) S Fanselow	1	2
(Portugal) G Elias	6	6
(Portugal) P Sousa	6	5	3
3	(Portugal) N Borges	4	7	6
8	(Bulgaria) D Kuzmanov	7^{7}	0	6
Q	(Bulgaria) A Lazarov	6^{5}	6	2
Q	(Germany) Lucas Gerch	6	6
(Romania) FC Jianu	3	4
Q	(Brazil) Oscar José Gutierrez	6	6
WC	(Portugal) T Cação	2	3
(Germany) L Wessels	1	4
2	(Czech Republic) Z Kolář	6	6

Second round
6	(Kazakhstan) D Popko	5	4
(Hungary) Z Piros	7	6
(Portugal) G Elias	2	7	6
3	(Portugal) N Borges	6	5	3
8	(Bulgaria) D Kuzmanov	6	6
Q	(Germany) L Gerch	2	1
Q	(Brazil) OJ Gutierrez	4	3
2	(Czech Republic) Z Kolář	6	6

Quarterfinals
(Hungary) Z Piros	4	7	3
(Portugal) G Elias	6	5	6
8	(Bulgaria) D Kuzmanov	1	6	6^{6}
2	(Czech Republic) Z Kolář	6	0	7^{8}

Semifinals
(Portugal) G Elias	2	6	6
2	(Czech Republic) Z Kolář	6	2	1
