= 2024 Open de Oeiras – Singles =

Singles
- 2024 Open de Oeiras

Final
- Champion: (Argentina) Francisco Comesaña
- Runner-up: (France) Ugo Blanchet
- Score: 6–4, 3–6, 7–5

Events
Singles	Doubles
← 2023 ·	Open de Oeiras	· 2024 →

Facundo Díaz Acosta was the defending champion but chose not to defend his title.

Francisco Comesaña won the title after defeating Ugo Blanchet 6–4, 3–6, 7–5 in the final.

== Seeds ==
1. (Italy) Fabio Fognini (second round)
2. (Brazil) Thiago Monteiro (first round)
3. (Hungary) Zsombor Piros (withdrew)
4. (Argentina) Francisco Comesaña (champion)
5. (United States) Emilio Nava (second round)
6. (France) Térence Atmane (second round)
7. (United States) Nicolas Moreno de Alboran (first round)
8. (Argentina) Juan Manuel Cerúndolo (first round)
9. (Netherlands) Jesper de Jong (second round)

== Draw ==
=== Key ===
- Q = Qualifier
- WC = Wild card
- LL = Lucky loser
- Alt = Alternate
- SE = Special exempt
- PR = Protected ranking
- ITF = ITF entry
- JE = Junior exempt
- w/o = Walkover
- r = Retired
- d = Defaulted
- SR = Special ranking

=== Finals ===
Semifinals
(France) Ugo Blanchet	6	6
Q	(France) Valentin Royer	4	2
4	(Argentina) Francisco Comesaña	5	7^{7}	6
WC	(Portugal) Jaime Faria	7	6^{4}	0

Final
(France) Ugo Blanchet	4	6	5
4	(Argentina) Francisco Comesaña	6	3	7

=== Top half ===
First round
1	(Italy) F Fognini	4	6	6
(Belgium) J De Loore	6	4	4
SE	(Slovakia) J Kovalík	6^{1}	2
SE	(Italy) S Napolitano	7^{7}	6
(France) U Blanchet	6	7^{7}
(Portugal) H Rocha	3	6^{1}
Q	(France) Mathys Erhard	6	3	2
5	(United States) E Nava	4	6	6
9	(Netherlands) J de Jong	6	6
Q	(Belgium) G Onclin	3	2
Q	(France) V Royer	6	5	6
Q	(Bulgaria) A Andreev	0	7	4
(Italy) F Agamenone	6	3	6
(France) G Blancaneaux	3	6	3
(Austria) D Novak	6	6
8	(Argentina) JM Cerúndolo	3	2

Second round
1	(Italy) F Fognini	5	6	6^{5}
SE	(Italy) S Napolitano	7	4	7^{7}
(France) U Blanchet	6	7^{7}
5	(United States) E Nava	4	6^{3}
9	(Netherlands) J de Jong	2	3
Q	(France) V Royer	6	6
(Italy) F Agamenone	3	1
(Austria) D Novak	6	6

Quarterfinals
SE	(Italy) S Napolitano	6	1	4
(France) U Blanchet	4	6	6
Q	(France) V Royer	7^{9}	1	6
(Austria) D Novak	6^{7}	6	3

Semifinals
(France) U Blanchet	6	6
Q	(France) V Royer	4	2

=== Bottom half ===
First round
7	(United States) N Moreno de Alboran	5	5
Q	(Italy) Samuel Vincent Ruggeri	7	7
WC	(Portugal) G Elias	6	1
LL	(Poland) M Kaśnikowski	1	1^{r}
(Ukraine) V Sachko	4	0^{r}
(Sweden) E Ymer	6	0
(Argentina) S Rodríguez Taverna	2	7	3
4	(Argentina) F Comesaña	6	5	6
6	(France) T Atmane	2	6	6
(United Kingdom) B Harris	6	3	4
(Lithuania) V Gaubas	7	2	6
WC	(Portugal) F Ferreira Silva	5	6	3
(France) Q Halys	6	6^{3}	2
Q	(Chinese Taipei) C-h Tseng	4	7^{7}	6
WC	(Portugal) J Faria	6	3	7^{7}
2	(Brazil) T Monteiro	2	6	6^{2}

Second round
Q	(Italy) S Vincent Ruggeri	6	6
WC	(Portugal) G Elias	2	3
(Sweden) E Ymer	6	4	6^{6}
4	(Argentina) F Comesaña	1	6	7^{8}
6	(France) T Atmane	1	0
(Lithuania) V Gaubas	6	6
Q	(Chinese Taipei) C-h Tseng	2	3
WC	(Portugal) J Faria	6	6

Quarterfinals
Q	(Italy) S Vincent Ruggeri	3	4
4	(Argentina) F Comesaña	6	6
(Lithuania) V Gaubas	4	6^{5}
WC	(Portugal) J Faria	6	7^{7}

Semifinals
4	(Argentina) F Comesaña	5	7^{7}	6
WC	(Portugal) J Faria	7	6^{4}	0
