= 2023 Open de Oeiras – Singles =

Singles
- 2023 Open de Oeiras

Final
- Champion: (Hungary) Zsombor Piros
- Runner-up: (Argentina) Juan Manuel Cerúndolo
- Score: 6–3, 6–4

Events
Singles	Doubles
← 2022 ·	Open de Oeiras	· 2023 →

Kaichi Uchida was the defending champion but lost in the quarterfinals to Juan Manuel Cerúndolo.

Zsombor Piros won the title after defeating Cerúndolo 6–3, 6–4 in the final.

== Seeds ==
1. (France) Adrian Mannarino (second round)
2. (France) Alexandre Müller (second round)
3. (Austria) Sebastian Ofner (semifinals)
4. (Argentina) Juan Manuel Cerúndolo (final)
5. (Portugal) João Sousa (first round)
6. (Japan) Kaichi Uchida (quarterfinals)
7. (Hungary) Zsombor Piros (champion)
8. (Italy) Andrea Vavassori (quarterfinals)

== Draw ==
=== Key ===
- Q = Qualifier
- WC = Wild card
- LL = Lucky loser
- Alt = Alternate
- SE = Special exempt
- PR = Protected ranking
- ITF = ITF entry
- JE = Junior exempt
- w/o = Walkover
- r = Retired
- d = Defaulted
- SR = Special ranking

=== Finals ===
Semifinals
7/SE	(Hungary) Zsombor Piros	6	6
3	(Austria) Sebastian Ofner	4	2
4	(Argentina) Juan Manuel Cerúndolo	6	6
WC	(Portugal) Pedro Sousa	2	4

Final
7/SE	(Hungary) Zsombor Piros	6	6
4	(Argentina) Juan Manuel Cerúndolo	3	4

=== Top half ===
First round
1	(France) A Mannarino	5	7	6
(Bulgaria) A Lazarov	7	5	2
(Belgium) K Coppejans	6	6
Q	(Portugal) J Faria	2	2
Q	(Spain) D Mérida	6	6
Q	(Romania) C Crețu	4	4
(Australia) D Sweeny	2	4
7/SE	(Hungary) Z Piros	6	6
3	(Austria) S Ofner	6	6
Q	(Czech Republic) P Nouza	3	4
(Australia) J McCabe	2	6	7^{7}
Alt	(Portugal) J Domingues	6	3	6^{3}
(Chinese Taipei) C-h Tseng	6	6
LL	(Germany) H Squire	2	3
(Portugal) F Ferreira Silva	2	0
8	(Italy) A Vavassori	6	6

Second round
1	(France) A Mannarino	6	2	3
(Belgium) K Coppejans	4	6	6
Q	(Spain) D Mérida	4	3
7/SE	(Hungary) Z Piros	6	6
3	(Austria) S Ofner	2	6	6
(Australia) J McCabe	6	1	2
(Chinese Taipei) C-h Tseng	3	1
8	(Italy) A Vavassori	6	6

Quarterfinals
(Belgium) K Coppejans	0	2
7/SE	(Hungary) Z Piros	6	6
3	(Austria) S Ofner	5	6	6
8	(Italy) A Vavassori	7	3	4

Semifinals
7/SE	(Hungary) Z Piros	6	6
3	(Austria) S Ofner	4	2

=== Bottom half ===
First round
6	(Japan) K Uchida	6	7^{7}
(Belgium) J De Loore	4	6^{3}
(France) H Mayot	3	4
(Bulgaria) A Andreev	6	6
(France) M Guinard	1	0^{r}
Q	(Spain) P Llamas Ruiz	6	3
WC	(Portugal) D Vale	4	4
4	(Argentina) JM Cerúndolo	6	6
5	(Portugal) J Sousa	1	3
(Canada) S Diez	6	6
(France) E Furness	7	7^{7}
Q	(United Kingdom) B Harris	5	6^{3}
WC	(Portugal) P Sousa	6	6
WC	(Portugal) H Rocha	3	4
(Romania) FC Jianu	4	6^{3}
2	(France) A Müller	6	7^{7}

Second round
6	(Japan) K Uchida	6	1	6
(Bulgaria) A Andreev	1	6	2
Q	(Spain) P Llamas Ruiz	4	3
4	(Argentina) JM Cerúndolo	6	6
(Canada) S Diez	7^{7}	6
(France) E Furness	6^{2}	1
WC	(Portugal) P Sousa	7	7^{7}
2	(France) A Müller	5	6^{4}

Quarterfinals
6	(Japan) K Uchida	3	3
4	(Argentina) JM Cerúndolo	6	6
(Canada) S Diez	5	6	3
WC	(Portugal) P Sousa	7	3	6

Semifinals
4	(Argentina) JM Cerúndolo	6	6
WC	(Portugal) P Sousa	2	4
