= 2021 Open de Oeiras – Doubles =

Doubles
- 2021 Open de Oeiras

Final
- Champions: (Germany) Mats Moraing (Germany) Oscar Otte
- Runners-up: (Italy) Riccardo Bonadio (Kazakhstan) Denis Yevseyev
- Score: 6–1, 6–4

Events
Singles	Doubles
- Open de Oeiras

This was the first of four editions of the tournament in the 2021 ATP Challenger Tour calendar.

Mats Moraing and Oscar Otte won the title after defeating Riccardo Bonadio and Denis Yevseyev 6–1, 6–4 in the final.

== Seeds ==
1. (France) Enzo Couacaud / (France) Manuel Guinard (quarterfinals)
2. (Peru) Sergio Galdós / (Spain) Sergio Martos Gornés (first round)
3. (Morocco) Elliot Benchetrit / (Czech Republic) Zdeněk Kolář (quarterfinals)
4. (Portugal) Gonçalo Falcão / (Portugal) Gonçalo Oliveira (quarterfinals)

== Draw ==
Key

- Q = Qualifier
- WC = Wild card
- LL = Lucky loser
- Alt = Alternate
- ITF = ITF entry
- PR = Protected ranking
- SR = Special ranking
- SE = Special exempt
- JE = Junior exempt
- JR = Junior Accelerator Programme entrant
- CO = College Accelerator Programme entrant
- NG = Next Gen Accelerator Program entrant
- w/o = Walkover
- r = Retired
- d = Defaulted

First round
1	(France) E Couacaud (France) M Guinard	6	6
WC	(Portugal) Pedro Araújo (Portugal) T Cação	0	3
Alt	(Australia) H Bourchier (Japan) K Uchida	4	3
(Russia) T Gabashvili (Chinese Taipei) C-h Tseng	6	6
3	(Morocco) E Benchetrit (Czech Republic) Z Kolář	6	7^{7}
WC	(Portugal) F Cabral (Portugal) Luís Faria	3	6^{5}
(United States) H Johnson (United States) Y Johnson	7	4	[3]
(Italy) R Bonadio (Kazakhstan) D Yevseyev	5	6	[10]
(Argentina) A Collarini (Italy) GM Moroni	4	4
(Germany) M Moraing (Germany) O Otte	6	6
(United States) E Escobedo (Ukraine) V Orlov	4	4
4	(Portugal) Gonçalo Falcão (Portugal) G Oliveira	6	6
(Austria) L Miedler (Croatia) N Serdarušić	6	6
WC	(Portugal) Miguel Gomes (Portugal) H Rocha	3	1
(Russia) P Kotov (Russia) A Vatutin	6	6
2	(Peru) S Galdós (Spain) S Martos Gornés	4	4

Quarterfinals
1	(France) E Couacaud (France) M Guinard	3	6	[5]
(Russia) T Gabashvili (Chinese Taipei) C-h Tseng	6	2	[10]
3	(Morocco) E Benchetrit (Czech Republic) Z Kolář	7^{7}	3	[8]
(Italy) R Bonadio (Kazakhstan) D Yevseyev	6^{3}	6	[10]
(Germany) M Moraing (Germany) O Otte	6	6
4	(Portugal) G Falcão (Portugal) G Oliveira	3	2
(Austria) L Miedler (Croatia) N Serdarušić	6	6
(Russia) P Kotov (Russia) A Vatutin	4	4

Semifinals
(Russia) T Gabashvili (Chinese Taipei) C-h Tseng	2	3
(Italy) R Bonadio (Kazakhstan) D Yevseyev	6	6
(Germany) M Moraing (Germany) O Otte	6	3	[10]
(Austria) L Miedler (Croatia) N Serdarušić	4	6	[8]

Final
(Italy) R Bonadio (Kazakhstan) D Yevseyev	1	4
(Germany) M Moraing (Germany) O Otte	6	6
