= 2021 Open de Oeiras – Singles =

Singles
- 2021 Open de Oeiras

Final
- Champion: (Czech Republic) Zdeněk Kolář
- Runner-up: (Portugal) Gastão Elias
- Score: 6–4, 7–5

Events
Singles	Doubles
- Open de Oeiras

This was the first of four editions of the tournament in the 2021 ATP Challenger Tour calendar.

Zdeněk Kolář won the title after defeating Gastão Elias 6–4, 7–5 in the final.

== Seeds ==
1. (Germany) Oscar Otte (first round)
2. (France) Enzo Couacaud (first round)
3. (India) Ramkumar Ramanathan (withdrew)
4. (United States) Ernesto Escobedo (first round)
5. (Argentina) Andrea Collarini (first round)
6. (Morocco) Elliot Benchetrit (first round)
7. (Italy) Gian Marco Moroni (second round)
8. (Czech Republic) Zdeněk Kolář (champion)

== Draw ==
Key

- Q = Qualifier
- WC = Wild card
- LL = Lucky loser
- Alt = Alternate
- ITF = ITF entry
- PR = Protected ranking
- SR = Special ranking
- SE = Special exempt
- JE = Junior exempt
- JR = Junior Accelerator Programme entrant
- CO = College Accelerator Programme entrant
- NG = Next Gen Accelerator Program entrant
- w/o = Walkover
- r = Retired
- d = Defaulted

=== Finals ===
Semifinals
(Argentina) Marco Trungelliti	3	2
8	(Czech Republic) Zdeněk Kolář	6	6
WC	(Portugal) Gastão Elias	6	7
Q	(France) Evan Furness	3	5

Final
8	(Czech Republic) Zdeněk Kolář	6	7
WC	(Portugal) Gastão Elias	4	5

=== Top half ===
First round
1	(Germany) O Otte	3	4
(Argentina) M Trungelliti	6	6
(Portugal) G Oliveira	6	6
Q	(Kazakhstan) D Yevseyev	1	2
Q	(France) M Guinard	1	5
(Netherlands) I Sijsling	6	7
(Russia) A Vatutin	4	3
7	(Italy) GM Moroni	6	6
LL	(Portugal) F Cabral	2	7^{7}	2
(Germany) M Moraing	6	6^{5}	6
(South Korea) D-h Lee	3	4
WC	(Portugal) T Cação	6	6
Alt	(Australia) H Bourchier	5	4
(Austria) L Miedler	7	6
WC	(Portugal) N Borges	6	6^{6}	1
8	(Czech Republic) Z Kolář	2	7^{8}	6

Second round
(Argentina) M Trungelliti	6	6
(Portugal) G Oliveira	1	3
(Netherlands) I Sijsling	6	6
7	(Italy) GM Moroni	2	2
(Germany) M Moraing	6	2	5
WC	(Portugal) T Cação	4	6	7
(Austria) L Miedler	1	1
8	(Czech Republic) Z Kolář	6	6

Quarterfinals
(Argentina) M Trungelliti	6	6
(Netherlands) I Sijsling	3	4
WC	(Portugal) T Cação	3	2
8	(Czech Republic) Z Kolář	6	6

Semifinals
(Argentina) M Trungelliti	3	2
8	(Czech Republic) Z Kolář	6	6

=== Bottom half ===
First round
5	(Argentina) A Collarini	6	3	5
(Slovakia) A Molčan	3	6	7
(Croatia) N Serdarušić	6	6
LL	(Portugal) Luís Faria	3	3
(Chinese Taipei) C-h Tseng	3	6	4
WC	(Portugal) G Elias	6	2	6
(Spain) R Ortega Olmedo	7	6
4	(United States) E Escobedo	5	4
6	(Morocco) E Benchetrit	3	1
Q	(Italy) R Brancaccio	6	6
(Spain) N Kuhn	6	6
(Russia) T Gabashvili	3	3
(Japan) K Uchida	6	4	6^{3}
(Italy) R Bonadio	3	6	7^{7}
Q	(France) E Furness	6	3	7^{7}
2	(France) E Couacaud	4	6	6^{4}

Second round
(Slovakia) A Molčan	6	6
(Croatia) N Serdarušić	4	2
WC	(Portugal) G Elias	3	6	6
(Spain) R Ortega Olmedo	6	1	3
Q	(Italy) R Brancaccio	6	6
(Spain) N Kuhn	1	2
(Italy) R Bonadio	6	3	4
Q	(France) E Furness	4	6	6

Quarterfinals
(Slovakia) A Molčan	2	5
WC	(Portugal) G Elias	6	7
Q	(Italy) R Brancaccio	1	6	4
Q	(France) E Furness	6	1	6

Semifinals
WC	(Portugal) G Elias	6	7
Q	(France) E Furness	3	5
