= 2022 Open de Oeiras – Singles =

Singles
- 2022 Open de Oeiras

Final
- Champion: (Portugal) Gastão Elias
- Runner-up: (Croatia) Nino Serdarušić
- Score: 6–3, 6–4

Events
Singles	Doubles
← 2021 ·	Open de Oeiras	· 2022 →

Gastão Elias was the defending champion and successfully defended his title, defeating Nino Serdarušić 6–3, 6–4 in the final.

== Seeds ==
1. (France) Benoît Paire (withdrew)
2. (Italy) Gianluca Mager (first round, retired)
3. (Italy) Stefano Travaglia (second round)
4. (Brazil) Thiago Monteiro (quarterfinals)
5. (Czech Republic) Zdeněk Kolář (second round)
6. (Portugal) Nuno Borges (semifinals)
7. (Czech Republic) Vít Kopřiva (quarterfinals)
8. (Italy) Alessandro Giannessi (semifinals)

== Draw ==
=== Key ===
- Q = Qualifier
- WC = Wild card
- LL = Lucky loser
- Alt = Alternate
- SE = Special exempt
- PR = Protected ranking
- ITF = ITF entry
- JE = Junior exempt
- w/o = Walkover
- r = Retired
- d = Defaulted
- SR = Special ranking

=== Finals ===
Semifinals
(Croatia) Nino Serdarušić	6	6
6	(Portugal) Nuno Borges	2	3
8	(Italy) Alessandro Giannessi	3	3
(Portugal) Gastão Elias	6	6

Final
(Croatia) Nino Serdarušić	3	4
(Portugal) Gastão Elias	6	6

=== Top half ===
First round
Q	(Turkey) E Kırkın	1	3
(Croatia) N Serdarušić	6	6
Q	(Germany) Lucas Gerch	3	4
(Portugal) P Sousa	6	6
Q	(United States) N Rubin	4	6	6
SE	(Poland) D Michalski	6	3	1
(France) M Bourgue	4	1
5	(Czech Republic) Z Kolář	6	6
4	(Brazil) T Monteiro	7^{7}	7^{8}
(Italy) GM Moroni	6^{5}	6^{6}
(Kazakhstan) T Skatov	6	6
WC	(Portugal) T Cação	2	1
LL	(Italy) F Forti	2	1
(Bulgaria) D Kuzmanov	6	6
WC	(Portugal) Pedro Araújo	4	2
6	(Portugal) N Borges	6	6

Second round
(Croatia) N Serdarušić	7^{7}	6
(Portugal) P Sousa	6^{3}	2
Q	(United States) N Rubin	6	6
5	(Czech Republic) Z Kolář	4	4
4	(Brazil) T Monteiro	6^{5}	6	7^{7}
(Kazakhstan) T Skatov	7^{7}	2	6^{4}
(Bulgaria) D Kuzmanov	6^{5}	5
6	(Portugal) N Borges	7^{7}	7

Quarterfinals
(Croatia) N Serdarušić	6^{5}	6	7
Q	(United States) N Rubin	7^{7}	2	5
4	(Brazil) T Monteiro	7^{8}	6^{2}	5
6	(Portugal) N Borges	6^{6}	7^{7}	7

Semifinals
(Croatia) N Serdarušić	6	6
6	(Portugal) N Borges	2	3

=== Bottom half ===
First round
8	(Italy) A Giannessi	6	6
(Germany) N Kuhn	3	4
Alt	(Italy) R Bonadio	6	6^{3}	6
(Italy) L Giustino	2	7^{7}	0
WC	(Portugal) J Domingues	4	2
(Italy) G Zeppieri	6	6
Q	(France) Matthieu Perchicot	1	1
3	(Italy) S Travaglia	6	6
7	(Czech Republic) V Kopřiva	6	6
Alt	(Czech Republic) L Rosol	4	0
(Kazakhstan) D Popko	3	2
Q	(Italy) L Darderi	6	6
(Portugal) G Elias	6	3	6
Q	(United States) A Rybakov	4	6	2
Alt	(Italy) A Vavassori	4	6	4
2	(Italy) G Mager	6	4	0^{r}

Second round
8	(Italy) A Giannessi	6	6
Alt	(Italy) R Bonadio	2	1
(Italy) G Zeppieri	7^{10}	6
3	(Italy) S Travaglia	6^{8}	4
7	(Czech Republic) V Kopřiva	6	6
Q	(Italy) L Darderi	3	2
(Portugal) G Elias	6	4	7^{8}
Alt	(Italy) A Vavassori	4	6	6^{6}

Quarterfinals
8	(Italy) A Giannessi	1	7	6
(Italy) G Zeppieri	6	5	3
7	(Czech Republic) V Kopřiva	3	2
(Portugal) G Elias	6	6

Semifinals
8	(Italy) A Giannessi	3	3
(Portugal) G Elias	6	6
