= 2022 Open de Oeiras =

- Date: 28 March–4 April
- Edition: 5th
- Surface: Clay
- Location: Oeiras, Portugal

Champions

Singles
- (Portugal) Gastão Elias

Doubles
- (Portugal) Nuno Borges / (Portugal) Francisco Cabral
← 2021 ·	Open de Oeiras	· 2022 →

The 2022 Open de Oeiras was a professional tennis tournament played on clay courts. It was the fifth edition of the tournament which was part of the 2022 ATP Challenger Tour. It took place in Oeiras, Portugal between 28 March and 4 April 2022.

== Singles main-draw entrants ==
=== Seeds ===
Country	Player	Rank^{1}	Seed
~~FRA~~	~~Benoît Paire~~	~~49~~	~~1~~
ITA	Gianluca Mager	99	2
ITA	Stefano Travaglia	113	3
BRA	Thiago Monteiro	116	4
CZE	Zdeněk Kolář	137	5
POR	Nuno Borges	150	6
CZE	Vít Kopřiva	164	7
ITA	Alessandro Giannessi	174	8

- ^{1} Rankings are as of 21 March 2022.

=== Other entrants ===
The following players received wildcards into the singles main draw:

- (Portugal) Pedro Araújo
- (Portugal) Tiago Cação
- (Portugal) João Domingues

The following player received entry into the singles main draw as a special exempt:

- (Poland) Daniel Michalski

The following players received entry into the singles main draw as alternates:

- (Italy) Riccardo Bonadio
- (Czech Republic) Lukáš Rosol
- (Italy) Andrea Vavassori

The following players received entry from the qualifying draw:

- (Italy) Luciano Darderi
- (Germany) Lucas Gerch
- (Turkey) Ergi Kırkın
- (France) Matthieu Perchicot
- (United States) Noah Rubin
- (United States) Alex Rybakov

The following player received entry as a lucky loser:

- (Italy) Francesco Forti

== Champions ==
=== Singles ===
- (Portugal) Gastão Elias def. (Croatia) Nino Serdarušić 6–3, 6–4.

=== Doubles ===
- (Portugal) Nuno Borges / (Portugal) Francisco Cabral def. (Uzbekistan) Sanjar Fayziev / (Greece) Markos Kalovelonis 6–3, 6–0.
