= 2022 Open de Oeiras II =

- Date: 4–10 April
- Edition: 6th
- Surface: Clay
- Location: Oeiras, Portugal

Champions

Singles
- (Portugal) Gastão Elias

Doubles
- (Portugal) Nuno Borges / (Portugal) Francisco Cabral
← 2022 ·	Open de Oeiras	· 2022 →

The 2022 Open de Oeiras II was a professional tennis tournament played on clay courts. It was the sixth edition of the tournament which was part of the 2022 ATP Challenger Tour. It took place in Oeiras, Portugal between 4 and 10 April 2022.

== Singles main-draw entrants ==
=== Seeds ===
Country	Player	Rank^{1}	Seed
BRA	Thiago Monteiro	116	1
CZE	Zdeněk Kolář	137	2
POR	Nuno Borges	150	3
AUS	Christopher O'Connell	153	4
ITA	Alessandro Giannessi	174	5
KAZ	Dmitry Popko	175	6
SVK	Jozef Kovalík	184	7
BUL	Dimitar Kuzmanov	191	8

- ^{1} Rankings are as of 21 March 2022.

=== Other entrants ===
The following players received wildcards into the singles main draw:

- (Portugal) Pedro Araújo
- (Portugal) Tiago Cação
- (Portugal) João Domingues

The following players received entry from the qualifying draw:

- (Germany) Lucas Gerch
- (Brazil) Oscar José Gutierrez
- (Turkey) Ergi Kırkın
- (Bulgaria) Alexandar Lazarov
- (Hungary) Fábián Marozsán
- (United States) Alex Rybakov

== Champions ==
=== Singles ===
- (Portugal) Gastão Elias def. (Italy) Alessandro Giannessi 7–6^{(7–4)}, 6–1.

=== Doubles ===
- (Portugal) Nuno Borges / (Portugal) Francisco Cabral def. (Czech Republic) Zdeněk Kolář / (Czech Republic) Adam Pavlásek 6–4, 6–0.
