= 2025 Open de Oeiras II – Singles =

Singles
- 2025 Open de Oeiras II

Final
- Champion: (Chile) Cristian Garín
- Runner-up: (United States) Mitchell Krueger
- Score: 7–6^{(7–3)}, 4–6, 6–2

Events
Singles	Doubles
← 2025 ·	Open de Oeiras	· 2026 →

Elmer Møller was the defending champion but withdrew from the tournament before his first round match.

Cristian Garín won the title after defeating Mitchell Krueger 7–6^{(7–3)}, 4–6, 6–2 in the final.

== Seeds ==
1. (Brazil) Thiago Monteiro (first round)
2. (Portugal) Jaime Faria (withdrew)
3. (United States) Christopher Eubanks (second round)
4. (Denmark) Elmer Møller (withdrew)
5. (United States) Tristan Boyer (first round)
6. (Brazil) Felipe Meligeni Alves (first round, retired)
7. (Argentina) Thiago Agustín Tirante (quarterfinals)
8. (Argentina) Román Andrés Burruchaga (semifinals)

== Draw ==
Key

- Q = Qualifier
- WC = Wild card
- LL = Lucky loser
- Alt = Alternate
- ITF = ITF entry
- PR = Protected ranking
- SR = Special ranking
- SE = Special exempt
- JE = Junior exempt
- JR = Junior Accelerator Programme entrant
- CO = College Accelerator Programme entrant
- NG = Next Gen Accelerator Program entrant
- w/o = Walkover
- r = Retired
- d = Defaulted

=== Finals ===
Semifinals
(United States) Mitchell Krueger	6	6
(Lebanon) Hady Habib	4	2
8	(Argentina) Román Andrés Burruchaga	7^{7}	3	4
(Chile) Cristian Garín	6^{5}	6	6

Final
(United States) Mitchell Krueger	6^{3}	6	2
(Chile) Cristian Garín	7^{7}	4	6

=== Top half ===
First round
1	(Brazil) T Monteiro	2	2
(United States) M Krueger	6	6
Q	(Spain) D Mérida	6	7
Q	A Vatutin	4	5
(Spain) C Taberner	4	6	6
Alt	(Argentina) P Cachin	6	4	1
PR	(China) Y Wu	7^{7}	4	6
5	(United States) T Boyer	6^{4}	6	2
LL	(Finland) E Vasa	6	6
LL	(Portugal) J Domingues	3	0
(United States) N Moreno de Alboran	3	2
(Lebanon) H Habib	6	6
Alt	(Argentina) GA Olivieri	2	7^{8}	3
(Japan) S Mochizuki	6	6^{6}	0^{r}
Q	(Netherlands) Ryan Nijboer	6	2	1
7	(Argentina) TA Tirante	2	6	6

Second round
(United States) M Krueger	3	6	6
Q	(Spain) D Mérida	6	1	2
(Spain) C Taberner	6	2	0
PR	(China) Y Wu	3	6	6
LL	(Finland) E Vasa	5	6^{5}
(Lebanon) H Habib	7	7^{7}
Alt	(Argentina) GA Olivieri	3	6	2
7	(Argentina) TA Tirante	6	1	6

Quarterfinals
(United States) M Krueger	6	6
PR	(China) Y Wu	4	4
(Lebanon) H Habib	6	6
7	(Argentina) TA Tirante	1	3

Semifinals
(United States) M Krueger	6	6
(Lebanon) H Habib	4	2

=== Bottom half ===
First round
8	(Argentina) RA Burruchaga	6	6
(Australia) J McCabe	3	3
(Japan) J Trotter	6	6
(France) S Gueymard Wayenburg	4	4
Q	(Italy) G Zeppieri	7^{9}	6
WC	(Portugal) T Pereira	6^{7}	3
WC	(Portugal) Pedro Araújo	1	7	3
3	(United States) C Eubanks	6	5	6
6	(Brazil) F Meligeni Alves	1	0^{r}
Alt	(Sweden) E Ymer	6	3
(Chile) C Garín	6	6
(Argentina) JP Ficovich	2	3
Q	(Switzerland) L Riedi	6	2^{r}
WC	(Portugal) G Elias	3	5
(Portugal) H Rocha	6	6
Q	(France) K de Schepper	2	3

Second round
8	(Argentina) RA Burruchaga	6	6
(Japan) J Trotter	4	2
Q	(Italy) G Zeppieri	7^{7}	6
3	(United States) C Eubanks	6^{4}	3
Alt	(Sweden) E Ymer	4	1
(Chile) C Garín	6	6
WC	(Portugal) G Elias	6^{9}	6	7
(Portugal) H Rocha	7^{11}	4	5

Quarterfinals
8	(Argentina) RA Burruchaga	7	4	6
Q	(Italy) G Zeppieri	5	6	1
(Chile) C Garín	6	7^{7}
WC	(Portugal) G Elias	3	6^{4}

Semifinals
8	(Argentina) RA Burruchaga	7^{7}	3	4
(Chile) C Garín	6^{5}	6	6
