= 2024 Open de Oeiras – Doubles =

Doubles
- 2024 Open de Oeiras

Final
- Champions: (Sweden) Filip Bergevi (Netherlands) Mick Veldheer
- Runners-up: (Spain) Sergio Martos Gornés (Greece) Petros Tsitsipas
- Score: 6–1, 6–4

Events
Singles	Doubles
← 2023 ·	Open de Oeiras	· 2024 →

Luke Johnson and Sem Verbeek were the defending champions but only Verbeek chose to defend his title, partnering André Göransson. He lost in the quarterfinals to Manuel Guinard and Grégoire Jacq.

Filip Bergevi and Mick Veldheer won the title after defeating Sergio Martos Gornés and Petros Tsitsipas 6–1, 6–4 in the final.

== Seeds ==
1. (Sweden) André Göransson / (Netherlands) Sem Verbeek (quarterfinals)
2. (Bolivia) Boris Arias / (Bolivia) Federico Zeballos (first round)
3. (Brazil) Fernando Romboli / (Brazil) Marcelo Zormann (quarterfinals)
4. (Italy) Marco Bortolotti / (France) Jonathan Eysseric (first round)

== Draw ==
Key

- Q = Qualifier
- WC = Wild card
- LL = Lucky loser
- Alt = Alternate
- ITF = ITF entry
- PR = Protected ranking
- SR = Special ranking
- SE = Special exempt
- JE = Junior exempt
- JR = Junior Accelerator Programme entrant
- CO = College Accelerator Programme entrant
- NG = Next Gen Accelerator Program entrant
- w/o = Walkover
- r = Retired
- d = Defaulted

=== Draw ===
First round
1	(Sweden) A Göransson (Netherlands) S Verbeek	6	7^{7}
(France) D Added (Brazil) O Luz	2	6^{4}
(France) M Guinard (France) G Jacq	7^{7}	6
WC	(Portugal) J Faria (Portugal) H Rocha	6^{3}	4
4	(Italy) M Bortolotti (France) J Eysseric	4	4
(Czech Republic) P Nouza (Czech Republic) P Rikl	6	6
(Spain) S Martos Gornés (Greece) Pe Tsitsipas	6	6
Alt	(Italy) F Agamenone (Australia) A Taylor	1	2
(Switzerland) L Margaroli (Argentina) S Rodríguez Taverna	6	3	[7]
(Spain) D Vega Hernández (Poland) S Walków	3	6	[10]
(Serbia) I Sabanov (Serbia) M Sabanov	1	1
3	(Brazil) F Romboli (Brazil) M Zormann	6	6
WC	(Portugal) F Ferreira Silva (Portugal) T Pereira	3	4
I Liutarevich (Ukraine) V Manafov	6	6
(Sweden) F Bergevi (Netherlands) M Veldheer	7^{7}	6
2	(Bolivia) B Arias (Bolivia) F Zeballos	6^{1}	1

Quarterfinals
1	(Sweden) A Göransson (Netherlands) S Verbeek	5	1
(France) M Guinard (France) G Jacq	7	6
(Czech Republic) P Nouza (Czech Republic) P Rikl	3	6^{3}
(Spain) S Martos Gornés (Greece) Pe Tsitsipas	6	7^{7}
(Spain) D Vega Hernández (Poland) S Walków	7^{7}	6
3	(Brazil) F Romboli (Brazil) M Zormann	6^{5}	3
I Liutarevich (Ukraine) V Manafov	3	4
(Sweden) F Bergevi (Netherlands) M Veldheer	6	6

Semifinals
(France) M Guinard (France) G Jacq	6	5	[7]
(Spain) S Martos Gornés (Greece) Pe Tsitsipas	4	7	[10]
(Spain) D Vega Hernández (Poland) S Walków	6^{5}	4
(Sweden) F Bergevi (Netherlands) M Veldheer	7^{7}	6

Final
(Spain) S Martos Gornés (Greece) Pe Tsitsipas	1	4
(Sweden) F Bergevi (Netherlands) M Veldheer	6	6
