= 2021 Open de Oeiras II =

- Date: 5–11 April
- Edition: 2nd
- Surface: Clay
- Location: Oeiras, Portugal

Champions

Singles
- (Argentina) Pedro Cachin

Doubles
- (Portugal) Nuno Borges / (Portugal) Francisco Cabral
← 2021 ·	Open de Oeiras	· 2021 →

The 2021 Open de Oeiras II was a professional tennis tournament played on clay courts. It was the second edition of the tournament, part of the 2021 ATP Challenger Tour. It took place in Oeiras, Portugal between 5 and 11 April 2021.

== Singles main-draw entrants ==
=== Seeds ===
Country	Player	Rank^{1}	Seed
GER	Oscar Otte	154	1
FRA	Enzo Couacaud	185	2
USA	Ernesto Escobedo	205	3
MAR	Elliot Benchetrit	240	4
ITA	Gian Marco Moroni	241	5
ARG	Marco Trungelliti	247	6
ESP	Nicola Kuhn	250	7
FRA	Tristan Lamasine	257	8

- ^{1} Rankings are as of 22 March 2021.

=== Other entrants ===
The following players received wildcards into the singles main draw:

- (Portugal) Pedro Araújo
- (Portugal) Nuno Borges
- (Portugal) Tiago Cação

The following player received entry into the singles main draw as a special exempt:

- (Portugal) Gastão Elias

The following players received entry into the singles main draw as alternates:

- (Australia) Harry Bourchier
- (Czech Republic) Jonáš Forejtek

The following players received entry from the qualifying draw:

- (Bulgaria) Adrian Andreev
- (Italy) Raúl Brancaccio
- (Argentina) Pedro Cachin
- (France) Evan Furness

== Champions ==
=== Singles ===
- (Argentina) Pedro Cachin def. (Portugal) Nuno Borges 7–6^{(7–4)}, 7–6^{(7–3)}.

=== Doubles ===
- (Portugal) Nuno Borges / (Portugal) Francisco Cabral def. (Russia) Pavel Kotov / (Chinese Taipei) Tseng Chun-hsin 6–1, 6–2.
