= 2022 Open de Oeiras – Doubles =

Doubles
- 2022 Open de Oeiras

Final
- Champions: (Portugal) Nuno Borges (Portugal) Francisco Cabral
- Runners-up: (Uzbekistan) Sanjar Fayziev (Greece) Markos Kalovelonis
- Score: 6–3, 6–0

Events
Singles	Doubles
← 2021 ·	Open de Oeiras	· 2022 →

Jesper de Jong and Tim van Rijthoven were the defending champions but chose not to defend their title.

Nuno Borges and Francisco Cabral won the title after defeating Sanjar Fayziev and Markos Kalovelonis 6–3, 6–0 in the final.

== Seeds ==
1. (Czech Republic) Zdeněk Kolář / (Italy) Andrea Vavassori (first round)
2. (Portugal) Nuno Borges / (Portugal) Francisco Cabral (champions)
3. (Italy) Marco Bortolotti / (India) Arjun Kadhe (first round)
4. (Romania) Victor Vlad Cornea / (Germany) Fabian Fallert (quarterfinals)

== Draw ==
=== Key ===
- Q = Qualifier
- WC = Wild card
- LL = Lucky loser
- Alt = Alternate
- SE = Special exempt
- PR = Protected ranking
- ITF = ITF entry
- JE = Junior exempt
- w/o = Walkover
- r = Retired
- d = Defaulted
- SR = Special ranking

First round
1	(Czech Republic) Z Kolář (Italy) A Vavassori	7	5	[8]
WC	(Portugal) Fábio Coelho (Portugal) Gonçalo Falcão	5	7	[10]
(Italy) L Giustino (Bulgaria) D Kuzmanov	4	6^{3}
WC	(Portugal) J Faria (Portugal) Luís Faria	6	7^{7}
3	(Italy) M Bortolotti (India) A Kadhe	6	5	[7]
(Uzbekistan) S Fayziev (Greece) M Kalovelonis	4	7	[10]
(Italy) A Giannessi (Brazil) T Monteiro	4	3
(Italy) F Forti (Italy) G Zeppieri	6	6
(Uruguay) M Cuevas (Italy) L Darderi	4	6	[10]
(Kazakhstan) D Popko (Kazakhstan) T Skatov	6	2	[8]
(Portugal) G Elias (Portugal) P Sousa	4	6	[7]
4	(Romania) VV Cornea (Germany) F Fallert	6	4	[10]
(Czech Republic) V Kopřiva (Czech Republic) A Pavlásek	6	6
(Sweden) DN Mădăraș (Poland) D Michalski	3	1
Alt	(Turkey) E Kırkın (United States) A Rybakov	3	5
2	(Portugal) N Borges (Portugal) F Cabral	6	7

Quarterfinals
WC	(Portugal) F Coelho (Portugal) G Falcão	6	3	[7]
WC	(Portugal) J Faria (Portugal) L Faria	3	6	[10]
(Uzbekistan) S Fayziev (Greece) M Kalovelonis	6	6
(Italy) F Forti (Italy) G Zeppieri	4	4
(Uruguay) M Cuevas (Italy) L Darderi	1	6	[10]
4	(Romania) VV Cornea (Germany) F Fallert	6	3	[7]
(Czech Republic) V Kopřiva (Czech Republic) A Pavlásek	3	3
2	(Portugal) N Borges (Portugal) F Cabral	6	6

Semifinals
WC	(Portugal) J Faria (Portugal) L Faria	3	1
(Uzbekistan) S Fayziev (Greece) M Kalovelonis	6	6
(Uruguay) M Cuevas (Italy) L Darderi	3	2
2	(Portugal) N Borges (Portugal) F Cabral	6	6

Final
(Uzbekistan) S Fayziev (Greece) M Kalovelonis	3	0
2	(Portugal) N Borges (Portugal) F Cabral	6	6
