= 2022 Open de Oeiras III =

- Date: 20–26 June
- Edition: 7th
- Surface: Clay
- Location: Oeiras, Portugal

Champions

Singles
- (Japan) Kaichi Uchida

Doubles
- (France) Sadio Doumbia / (France) Fabien Reboul
← 2022 ·	Open de Oeiras	· 2023 →

The 2022 Open de Oeiras III was a professional tennis tournament played on clay courts. It was the seventh edition of the tournament which was part of the 2022 ATP Challenger Tour. It took place in Oeiras, Portugal between 20 and 26 June 2022.

== Singles main-draw entrants ==
=== Seeds ===
Country	Player	Rank^{1}	Seed
ESP	Roberto Carballés Baena	91	1
ARG	Facundo Bagnis	108	2
CHI	Nicolás Jarry	136	3
BRA	Daniel Dutra da Silva	236	4
	Evgeny Karlovskiy	250	5
JPN	Kaichi Uchida	258	6
SUI	Johan Nikles	260	7
FRA	Laurent Lokoli	268	8

- ^{1} Rankings are as of 13 June 2022.

=== Other entrants ===
The following players received wildcards into the singles main draw:

- (Portugal) Pedro Araújo
- (Portugal) Tiago Cação
- (Portugal) João Domingues

The following player received entry into the singles main draw as an alternate:

- (France) Kyrian Jacquet

The following players received entry from the qualifying draw:

- (Brazil) Thomaz Bellucci
- (Brazil) Pedro Boscardin Dias
- (Germany) Lucas Gerch
- (Brazil) Oscar José Gutierrez
- (Bulgaria) Alexandar Lazarov
- (United States) Alex Rybakov

== Champions ==
=== Singles ===
- (Japan) Kaichi Uchida def. (Belgium) Kimmer Coppejans 6–2, 6–4.

=== Doubles ===
- (France) Sadio Doumbia / (France) Fabien Reboul def. (United States) Robert Galloway / (United States) Alex Lawson 6–3, 3–6, [15–13].
