= 2021 Open de Oeiras =

- Date: 29 March – 3 April
- Edition: 1st
- Surface: Clay
- Location: Oeiras, Portugal

Champions

Singles
- (Czech Republic) Zdeněk Kolář

Doubles
- (Germany) Mats Moraing / (Germany) Oscar Otte
Open de Oeiras	· 2021 →

The 2021 Open de Oeiras was a professional tennis tournament played on clay courts. It was the first edition of the tournament which was part of the 2021 ATP Challenger Tour. It took place in Oeiras, Portugal between 29 March and 3 April 2021.

== Singles main-draw entrants ==
=== Seeds ===
Country	Player	Rank^{1}	Seed
GER	Oscar Otte	154	1
FRA	Enzo Couacaud	185	2
~~IND~~	~~Ramkumar Ramanathan~~	~~195~~	~~3~~
USA	Ernesto Escobedo	205	4
ARG	Andrea Collarini	215	5
MAR	Elliot Benchetrit	240	6
ITA	Gian Marco Moroni	241	7
CZE	Zdeněk Kolář	246	8

- ^{1} Rankings are as of 22 March 2021.

=== Other entrants ===
The following players received wildcards into the singles main draw:

- (Portugal) Nuno Borges
- (Portugal) Tiago Cação
- (Portugal) Gastão Elias

The following player received entry into the singles main draw as an alternate:

- (Australia) Harry Bourchier

The following players received entry from the qualifying draw:

- (Italy) Raúl Brancaccio
- (France) Evan Furness
- (France) Manuel Guinard
- (Kazakhstan) Denis Yevseyev

The following players received entry as lucky losers:

- (Portugal) Francisco Cabral
- (Portugal) Luís Faria

== Champions ==
=== Singles ===
- (Czech Republic) Zdeněk Kolář def. (Portugal) Gastão Elias 6–4, 7–5.

=== Doubles ===
- (Germany) Mats Moraing / (Germany) Oscar Otte def. (Italy) Riccardo Bonadio / (Kazakhstan) Denis Yevseyev 6–1, 6–4.
