= 2021 Open de Oeiras II – Singles =

Singles
- 2021 Open de Oeiras II

Final
- Champion: (Argentina) Pedro Cachin
- Runner-up: (Portugal) Nuno Borges
- Score: 7–6^{(7–4)}, 7–6^{(7–3)}

Events
Singles	Doubles
- Open de Oeiras

This was the second of four editions of the tournament in the 2021 ATP Challenger Tour calendar.

Zdeněk Kolář was the defending champion but chose not to defend his title.

Pedro Cachin won the title after defeating Nuno Borges 7–6^{(7–4)}, 7–6^{(7–3)} in the final.

== Seeds ==
1. (Germany) Oscar Otte (second round)
2. (France) Enzo Couacaud (first round)
3. (United States) Ernesto Escobedo (second round)
4. (Morocco) Elliot Benchetrit (first round)
5. (Italy) Gian Marco Moroni (quarterfinals)
6. (Argentina) Marco Trungelliti (first round)
7. (Spain) Nicola Kuhn (first round)
8. (France) Tristan Lamasine (first round)

== Draw ==
Key

- Q = Qualifier
- WC = Wild card
- LL = Lucky loser
- Alt = Alternate
- ITF = ITF entry
- PR = Protected ranking
- SR = Special ranking
- SE = Special exempt
- JE = Junior exempt
- JR = Junior Accelerator Programme entrant
- CO = College Accelerator Programme entrant
- NG = Next Gen Accelerator Program entrant
- w/o = Walkover
- r = Retired
- d = Defaulted

=== Finals ===
Semifinals
(Portugal) Gonçalo Oliveira	6^{4}	0^{r}
Q	(Argentina) Pedro Cachin	7^{7}	4
SE	(Portugal) Gastão Elias	6	2	3
WC	(Portugal) Nuno Borges	4	6	6

Final
Q	(Argentina) Pedro Cachin	7^{7}	7^{7}
WC	(Portugal) Nuno Borges	6^{4}	6^{3}

=== Top half ===
First round
1	(Germany) O Otte	6	6
WC	(Portugal) Pedro Araújo	2	4
(Italy) R Bonadio	6^{4}	5
(Portugal) G Oliveira	7^{7}	7
(Germany) M Zverev	4
(Germany) M Moraing	3^{r}
WC	(Portugal) T Cação	6	6
8	(France) T Lamasine	2	4
4	(Morocco) E Benchetrit	2	1
Q	(Argentina) P Cachin	6	6
(Chinese Taipei) C-h Tseng	6	6^{5}	3
Q	(Bulgaria) A Andreev	1	7^{7}	6
(Russia) P Kotov	6	3
Alt	(Australia) H Bourchier	0	0^{r}
(Slovakia) A Molčan	2	4
5	(Italy) GM Moroni	6	6

Second round
1	(Germany) O Otte	4	6	3
(Portugal) G Oliveira	6	4	6
(Germany) M Zverev	3	6	6^{6}
WC	(Portugal) T Cação	6	1	7^{8}
Q	(Argentina) P Cachin	6	6
Q	(Bulgaria) A Andreev	2	4
(Russia) P Kotov	2	2
5	(Italy) GM Moroni	6	6

Quarterfinals
(Portugal) G Oliveira	7	6
WC	(Portugal) T Cação	5	2
Q	(Argentina) P Cachin	6	2	6
5	(Italy) GM Moroni	3	6	4

Semifinals
(Portugal) G Oliveira	6^{4}	0^{r}
Q	(Argentina) P Cachin	7^{7}	4

=== Bottom half ===
First round
6	(Argentina) M Trungelliti	1	4
SE	(Portugal) G Elias	6	6
(Spain) C Gimeno Valero	6	6
(Spain) R Ortega Olmedo	1	1
(Bulgaria) D Kuzmanov	6	6
(Austria) L Miedler	1	0
Q	(France) E Furness	3	2
3	(United States) E Escobedo	6	6
7	(Spain) N Kuhn	1	4
(France) M Guinard	6	6
(France) H Grenier	6	6
(South Korea) D-h Lee	0	3
Alt	(Czech Republic) J Forejtek	3^{r}
Q	(Italy) R Brancaccio	4
WC	(Portugal) N Borges	6	6
2	(France) E Couacaud	3	4

Second round
SE	(Portugal) G Elias	6	6
(Spain) C Gimeno Valero	1	3
(Bulgaria) D Kuzmanov	6	6
3	(United States) E Escobedo	2	2
(France) M Guinard	6	6
(France) H Grenier	4	1
Q	(Italy) R Brancaccio	4	6	3
WC	(Portugal) N Borges	6	4	6

Quarterfinals
SE	(Portugal) G Elias	w/o
(Bulgaria) D Kuzmanov
(France) M Guinard	3	6	3
WC	(Portugal) N Borges	6	3	6

Semifinals
SE	(Portugal) G Elias	6	2	3
WC	(Portugal) N Borges	4	6	6
