= 2026 Open de Oeiras II – Singles =

Singles
- 2026 Open de Oeiras II

Final
- Champion: (Serbia) Laslo Djere
- Runner-up: (United States) Emilio Nava
- Score: 6–3, 6–4

Events
Singles	Doubles
- Open de Oeiras

Roman Safiullin was the defending champion but lost in the second round to Laslo Djere.

Djere won the title after defeating Emilio Nava 6–3, 6–4 in the final.

== Seeds ==
1. (Chile) Cristian Garín (first round)
2. (United States) Emilio Nava (final)
3. (Portugal) Jaime Faria (semifinals)
4. (Portugal) Henrique Rocha (first round)
5. (Lithuania) Vilius Gaubas (second round)
6. (Bolivia) Hugo Dellien (semifinals, retired)
7. (Chile) Tomás Barrios Vera (quarterfinals)
8. (United Kingdom) Jack Pinnington Jones (second round)

== Draw ==
Key

- Q = Qualifier
- WC = Wild card
- LL = Lucky loser
- Alt = Alternate
- ITF = ITF entry
- PR = Protected ranking
- SR = Special ranking
- SE = Special exempt
- JE = Junior exempt
- JR = Junior Accelerator Programme entrant
- CO = College Accelerator Programme entrant
- NG = Next Gen Accelerator Program entrant
- w/o = Walkover
- r = Retired
- d = Defaulted

=== Finals ===
Semifinals
6	(Bolivia) Hugo Dellien	2^{r}
Q	(Serbia) Laslo Djere	2
3	(Portugal) Jaime Faria	2	7^{9}	6^{5}
2	(United States) Emilio Nava	6	6^{7}	7^{7}

Final
Q	(Serbia) Laslo Djere	6	6
2	(United States) Emilio Nava	3	4

=== Top half ===
First round
1	(Chile) C Garín	3	7	4
Alt	(Argentina) L Midón	6	5	6
Q	(Lebanon) B Hassan	6	6
(Colombia) N Mejía	4	3
(Czech Republic) Z Kolář	6	6
Q	(China) Z Zhang	3	4
(Argentina) F Díaz Acosta	2	6^{6}
6	(Bolivia) H Dellien	6	7^{8}
4	(Portugal) H Rocha	7	6^{5}	2
R Safiullin	5	7^{7}	6
Q	(Serbia) L Djere	6	6
(Brazil) G Heide	2	2
(Austria) J Rodionov	3	3
Alt	(United States) C Smith	6	6
NG	(United States) Dar Blanch	3	7^{7}	5
8	(United Kingdom) J Pinnington Jones	6	6^{4}	7

Second round
Alt	(Argentina) L Midón	4	6	3
Q	(Lebanon) B Hassan	6	2	6
(Czech Republic) Z Kolář	4	6	6^{4}
6	(Bolivia) H Dellien	6	4	7^{7}
R Safiullin	4	5
Q	(Serbia) L Djere	6	7
Alt	(United States) C Smith	6	6
8	(United Kingdom) J Pinnington Jones	4	1

Quarterfinals
Q	(Lebanon) B Hassan	5	3^{r}
6	(Bolivia) H Dellien	7	5
Q	(Serbia) L Djere	6	6
Alt	(United States) C Smith	4	4

Semifinals
6	(Bolivia) H Dellien	2^{r}
Q	(Serbia) L Djere	2

=== Bottom half ===
First round
5	(Lithuania) V Gaubas	6	2	6
WC	(Portugal) F Ferreira Silva	3	6	1
(United Kingdom) B Harris	5	7	3
NG	(Czech Republic) Petr Brunclík	7	5	6
Q	(Spain) D Jordà Sanchis	5	4
Q	(Finland) E Vasa	7	6
Q	(Portugal) T Torres	3	4
3	(Portugal) J Faria	6	6
7	(Chile) T Barrios Vera	6	6
(United States) M Zheng	4	4
Alt	(Argentina) GA Olivieri	1	6	3
(United States) N Basavareddy	6	1	6
WC	(Portugal) T Pereira	6	3	0
WC	(Portugal) G Elias	2	6	0^{r}
(Canada) L Draxl	6^{3}	3
2	(United States) E Nava	7^{7}	6

Second round
5	(Lithuania) V Gaubas	6	4	3
NG	(Czech Republic) P Brunclík	3	6	6
Q	(Finland) E Vasa	3	1
3	(Portugal) J Faria	6	6
7	(Chile) T Barrios Vera	6	6
(United States) N Basavareddy	1	4
WC	(Portugal) T Pereira	3	3
2	(United States) E Nava	6	6

Quarterfinals
NG	(Czech Republic) P Brunclík	6	6^{3}	2
3	(Portugal) J Faria	1	7^{7}	6
7	(Chile) T Barrios Vera	6	4	6^{9}
2	(United States) E Nava	2	6	7^{11}

Semifinals
3	(Portugal) J Faria	2	7^{9}	6^{5}
2	(United States) E Nava	6	6^{7}	7^{7}
