= 2023 Open de Oeiras – Doubles =

Doubles
- 2023 Open de Oeiras

Final
- Champions: (Romania) Victor Vlad Cornea (Croatia) Franko Škugor
- Runners-up: (Brazil) Marcelo Demoliner (Italy) Andrea Vavassori
- Score: 7–6^{(7–2)}, 7–6^{(7–4)}

Events
Singles	Doubles
← 2022 ·	Open de Oeiras	· 2023 →

Sadio Doumbia and Fabien Reboul were the defending champions but chose not to defend their title.

Victor Vlad Cornea and Franko Škugor won the title after defeating Marcelo Demoliner and Andrea Vavassori 7–6^{(7–2)}, 7–6^{(7–4)} in the final.

== Seeds ==
1. (Brazil) Marcelo Demoliner / (Italy) Andrea Vavassori (final)
2. (India) Sriram Balaji / (India) Jeevan Nedunchezhiyan (first round)
3. (Monaco) Romain Arneodo / (Austria) Sam Weissborn (withdrew)
4. (Romania) Victor Vlad Cornea / (Croatia) Franko Škugor (champions)
5. (Italy) Marco Bortolotti / (Spain) Sergio Martos Gornés (semifinals)

== Draw ==
Key

- Q = Qualifier
- WC = Wild card
- LL = Lucky loser
- Alt = Alternate
- ITF = ITF entry
- PR = Protected ranking
- SR = Special ranking
- SE = Special exempt
- JE = Junior exempt
- JR = Junior Accelerator Programme entrant
- CO = College Accelerator Programme entrant
- NG = Next Gen Accelerator Program entrant
- w/o = Walkover
- r = Retired
- d = Defaulted

First round
1	(Brazil) M Demoliner (Italy) A Vavassori	7^{7}	6^{6}	[12]
WC	(Portugal) J Faria (Portugal) P Sousa	6^{4}	7^{8}	[10]
(France) M Guinard (Brazil) F Romboli	6	6^{4}	[5]
(Germany) C Frantzen (Germany) H Jebens	4	7^{7}	[10]
5	(Italy) M Bortolotti (Spain) S Martos Gornés	6	6^{2}	[10]
(United Kingdom) L Johnson (Netherlands) S Verbeek	4	7^{7}	[6]
Alt	(Australia) J McCabe (Austria) S Ofner	6	6
WC	(Portugal) J Domingues (Portugal) F Ferreira Silva	3	2
(United Kingdom) C Broom (India) P Raja	2	2
(Czech Republic) P Nouza (Slovakia) I Zelenay	6	6
Alt	(Bulgaria) A Andreev; E Karlovskiy	3	4
4	(Romania) VV Cornea (Croatia) F Škugor	6	6
(Netherlands) S Arends (Greece) Pe Tsitsipas	6	3	[10]
(India) VS Prashanth (New Zealand) A Sitak	4	6	[6]
(Poland) K Drzewiecki (Poland) S Walków	7	3	[10]
2	(India) S Balaji (India) J Nedunchezhiyan	5	6	[7]

Quarterfinals
1	(Brazil) M Demoliner (Italy) A Vavassori	7^{7}	6^{4}	[10]
(Germany) C Frantzen (Germany) H Jebens	6^{5}	7^{7}	[8]
5	(Italy) M Bortolotti (Spain) S Martos Gornés	4	6	[10]
Alt	(Australia) J McCabe (Austria) S Ofner	6	2	[3]
(Czech Republic) P Nouza (Slovakia) I Zelenay	6^{5}	6	[9]
4	(Romania) VV Cornea (Croatia) F Škugor	7^{7}	3	[11]
(Netherlands) S Arends (Greece) Pe Tsitsipas	6	7^{8}
(Poland) K Drzewiecki (Poland) S Walków	3	6^{6}

Semifinals
1	(Brazil) M Demoliner (Italy) A Vavassori	6	6
5	(Italy) M Bortolotti (Spain) S Martos Gornés	1	2
4	(Romania) VV Cornea (Croatia) F Škugor	6	6
(Netherlands) S Arends (Greece) Pe Tsitsipas	3	2

Final
1	(Brazil) M Demoliner (Italy) A Vavassori	6^{2}	6^{4}
4	(Romania) VV Cornea (Croatia) F Škugor	7^{7}	7^{7}
