= 2023 Open de Oeiras II =

- Date: 15–20 May
- Edition: 9th
- Surface: Clay
- Location: Oeiras, Portugal

Champions

Singles
- (Argentina) Facundo Díaz Acosta

Doubles
- (United Kingdom) Luke Johnson / (Netherlands) Sem Verbeek
← 2023 ·	Open de Oeiras	· 2024 →

The 2023 Open de Oeiras II was a professional tennis tournament played on clay courts. It was the ninth edition of the tournament which was part of the 2023 ATP Challenger Tour. It took place in Oeiras, Portugal between 15 and 20 May 2023.

== Singles main-draw entrants ==
=== Seeds ===
Country	Player	Rank^{1}	Seed
ARG	Pedro Cachin	68	1
FRA	Hugo Gaston	110	2
MDA	Radu Albot	112	3
ECU	Emilio Gómez	116	4
ARG	Facundo Bagnis	123	5
AUS	Aleksandar Vukic	127	6
ARG	Facundo Díaz Acosta	134	7
AUS	Rinky Hijikata	139	8

- ^{1} Rankings are as of 8 May 2023.

=== Other entrants ===
The following players received wildcards into the singles main draw:

- (Portugal) João Domingues
- (Portugal) Frederico Ferreira Silva
- (Portugal) Pedro Sousa

The following players received entry into the singles main draw as alternates:

- (Bulgaria) Adrian Andreev
- (Argentina) Federico Delbonis

The following players received entry from the qualifying draw:

- (United States) Ulises Blanch
- (Italy) Alessandro Giannessi
- (France) Manuel Guinard
- (Brazil) Eduardo Ribeiro
- (Croatia) Nino Serdarušić
- (Hungary) Máté Valkusz

== Champions ==
=== Singles ===
- (Argentina) Facundo Díaz Acosta def. (Australia) Aleksandar Vukic 6–4, 6–3.

=== Doubles ===
- (United Kingdom) Luke Johnson / (Netherlands) Sem Verbeek def. (Portugal) Jaime Faria / (Portugal) Henrique Rocha 6–7^{(6–8)}, 7–5, [10–6].
