= 2021 Open de Oeiras II – Doubles =

Doubles
- 2021 Open de Oeiras II

Final
- Champions: (Portugal) Nuno Borges (Portugal) Francisco Cabral
- Runners-up: (Russia) Pavel Kotov (Chinese Taipei) Tseng Chun-hsin
- Score: 6–1, 6–2

Events
Singles	Doubles
- Open de Oeiras

This was the second of four editions of the tournament in the 2021 ATP Challenger Tour calendar.

Mats Moraing and Oscar Otte were the defending champions but withdrew from the tournament before their first round match.

Nuno Borges and Francisco Cabral won the title after defeating Pavel Kotov and Tseng Chun-hsin 6–1, 6–2 in the final.

== Seeds ==
1. (France) Enzo Couacaud / (France) Manuel Guinard (quarterfinals)
2. (Australia) Harry Bourchier / (Peru) Sergio Galdós (quarterfinals)
3. (United States) Hunter Johnson / (United States) Yates Johnson (first round)
4. (Portugal) Gonçalo Falcão / (Kazakhstan) Denis Yevseyev (first round)

== Draw ==
Key

- Q = Qualifier
- WC = Wild card
- LL = Lucky loser
- Alt = Alternate
- ITF = ITF entry
- PR = Protected ranking
- SR = Special ranking
- SE = Special exempt
- JE = Junior exempt
- JR = Junior Accelerator Programme entrant
- CO = College Accelerator Programme entrant
- NG = Next Gen Accelerator Program entrant
- w/o = Walkover
- r = Retired
- d = Defaulted

First round
1	(France) E Couacaud (France) M Guinard	6	6
(South Korea) D-h Lee (Portugal) G Oliveira	0	2
(United States) N Chappell (Ukraine) V Orlov	w/o
(Germany) M Moraing (Germany) O Otte
4	(Portugal) Gonçalo Falcão (Kazakhstan) D Yevseyev	6	4	[9]
(Germany) M Rosenkranz (Germany) Tom Schönenberg	3	6	[11]
(Portugal) N Borges (Portugal) F Cabral	6	6
WC	(Portugal) Eduardo Morais (Portugal) Vasco Prata	1	3
WC	(Portugal) Miguel Gomes (Portugal) H Rocha	1	2
(United States) E Escobedo (Austria) L Miedler	6	6
(Italy) R Brancaccio (Spain) Eduard Esteve Lobato	2	6	[10]
3	(United States) H Johnson (United States) Y Johnson	6	2	[5]
WC	(Portugal) J Faria (Portugal) T Torres	2	4
(Russia) P Kotov (Chinese Taipei) C-h Tseng	6	6
(Italy) GM Moroni (Spain) R Ortega Olmedo
2	(Australia) H Bourchier (Peru) S Galdós	w/o

Quarterfinals
1	(France) E Couacaud (France) M Guinard	3	7	[6]
(United States) N Chappell (Ukraine) V Orlov	6	5	[10]
(Germany) M Rosenkranz (Germany) T Schönenberg	6^{5}	1
(Portugal) N Borges (Portugal) F Cabral	7^{7}	6
(United States) E Escobedo (Austria) L Miedler	w/o
(Italy) R Brancaccio (Spain) E Esteve Lobato
(Russia) P Kotov (Chinese Taipei) C-h Tseng	6	6
2	(Australia) H Bourchier (Peru) S Galdós	4	4

Semifinals
(United States) N Chappell (Ukraine) V Orlov	2	1
(Portugal) N Borges (Portugal) F Cabral	6	6
(United States) E Escobedo (Austria) L Miedler	6	2	[6]
(Russia) P Kotov (Chinese Taipei) C-h Tseng	4	6	[10]

Final
(Portugal) N Borges (Portugal) F Cabral	6	6
(Russia) P Kotov (Chinese Taipei) C-h Tseng	1	2
