= 2023 Open de Oeiras II – Doubles =

Doubles
- 2023 Open de Oeiras II

Final
- Champions: (United Kingdom) Luke Johnson (Netherlands) Sem Verbeek
- Runners-up: (Portugal) Jaime Faria (Portugal) Henrique Rocha
- Score: 6–7^{(6–8)}, 7–5, [10–6]

Events
Singles	Doubles
← 2023 ·	Open de Oeiras	· 2024 →

Victor Vlad Cornea and Franko Škugor were the defending champions but chose not to defend their title.

Luke Johnson and Sem Verbeek won the title after defeating Jaime Faria and Henrique Rocha 6–7^{(6–8)}, 7–5, [10–6] in the final.

== Seeds ==
1. (United States) Hunter Reese / (Poland) Szymon Walków (first round)
2. Ivan Liutarevich / (Ukraine) Vladyslav Manafov (first round)
3. (United Kingdom) Luke Johnson / (Netherlands) Sem Verbeek (champions)
4. (India) Purav Raja / (India) Divij Sharan (first round)

== Draw ==
=== Key ===
- Q = Qualifier
- WC = Wild card
- LL = Lucky loser
- Alt = Alternate
- SE = Special exempt
- PR = Protected ranking
- ITF = ITF entry
- JE = Junior exempt
- w/o = Walkover
- r = Retired
- d = Defaulted
- SR = Special ranking

First round
1	(United States) H Reese (Poland) S Walków	6	4	[3]
WC	(Portugal) J Faria (Portugal) H Rocha	3	6	[10]
(Croatia) Z Babić (Kazakhstan) G Lomakin	7	3	[10]
Alt	(Portugal) Gonçalo Falcão (Germany) S Fanselow	5	6	[5]
4	(India) P Raja (India) D Sharan	6^{3}	2
(Peru) A Merino (Germany) C Negritu	7^{7}	6
WC	(Portugal) J Domingues (Portugal) F Ferreira Silva	6^{4}	6^{1}
(Uzbekistan) S Fayziev (Romania) A Jecan	7^{7}	7^{7}
(United Kingdom) S Duncan (United Kingdom) M Willis	7^{8}	6^{2}	[10]
(Bulgaria) A Andreev (Ukraine) O Krutykh	6^{6}	7^{7}	[5]
I Gakhov (Australia) J Taylor	6^{2}	6	[5]
3	(United Kingdom) L Johnson (Netherlands) S Verbeek	7^{7}	4	[10]
Alt	(Spain) P Martínez (Netherlands) M Vervoort	3	6	[10]
(France) C Bittoun Kouzmine (United Kingdom) J Paris	6	3	[5]
(Switzerland) L Margaroli (Brazil) F Romboli	6	6
2	I Liutarevich (Ukraine) V Manafov	3	3

Quarterfinals
WC	(Portugal) J Faria (Portugal) H Rocha	6	6
(Croatia) Z Babić (Kazakhstan) G Lomakin	1	4
(Peru) A Merino (Germany) C Negritu	6	3	[14]
(Uzbekistan) S Fayziev (Romania) A Jecan	4	6	[16]
(United Kingdom) S Duncan (United Kingdom) M Willis	2	4
3	(United Kingdom) L Johnson (Netherlands) S Verbeek	6	6
Alt	(Spain) P Martínez (Netherlands) M Vervoort	6	5	[7]
(Switzerland) L Margaroli (Brazil) F Romboli	4	7	[10]

Semifinals
WC	(Portugal) J Faria (Portugal) H Rocha	7	6
(Uzbekistan) S Fayziev (Romania) A Jecan	5	1
3	(United Kingdom) L Johnson (Netherlands) S Verbeek	6	6
(Switzerland) L Margaroli (Brazil) F Romboli	3	3

Final
WC	(Portugal) J Faria (Portugal) H Rocha	7^{8}	5	[6]
3	(United Kingdom) L Johnson (Netherlands) S Verbeek	6^{6}	7	[10]
