= 2025 Open de Oeiras II =

- Date: 12–17 May
- Edition: 13th
- Surface: Clay
- Location: Oeiras, Portugal

Champions

Singles
- (Chile) Cristian Garín

Doubles
- (Germany) Andreas Mies / (Spain) David Vega Hernández
| ← 2025 · | Open de Oeiras | · 2026 → |

The 2025 Open de Oeiras II was a professional tennis tournament played on clay courts. It was the 13th edition of the tournament which was part of the 2025 ATP Challenger Tour. It took place in Oeiras, Portugal between 12 and 17 May 2025.

== Singles main-draw entrants ==
=== Seeds ===
| Country | Player | Rank^{1} | Seed |
|---|---|---|---|
| BRA | Thiago Monteiro | 106 | 1 |
| ~~POR~~ | ~~Jaime Faria~~ | ~~108~~ | ~~2~~ |
| USA | Christopher Eubanks | 110 | 3 |
| ~~DEN~~ | ~~Elmer Møller~~ | ~~111~~ | ~~4~~ |
| USA | Tristan Boyer | 122 | 5 |
| BRA | Felipe Meligeni Alves | 123 | 6 |
| ARG | Thiago Agustín Tirante | 133 | 7 |
| ARG | Román Andrés Burruchaga | 135 | 8 |

- ^{1} Rankings are as of 5 May 2025.

=== Other entrants ===
The following players received wildcards into the singles main draw:

- (Portugal) Pedro Araújo
- (Portugal) Gastão Elias
- (Portugal) Tiago Pereira

The following player received entry into the singles main draw using a protected ranking:

- (China) Wu Yibing

The following players received entry into the singles main draw as alternates:

- (Argentina) Pedro Cachin
- (Argentina) Genaro Alberto Olivieri
- (Sweden) Elias Ymer

The following players received entry from the qualifying draw:

- (France) Kenny de Schepper
- (Spain) Daniel Mérida
- (Netherlands) Ryan Nijboer
- (Switzerland) Leandro Riedi
- Alexey Vatutin
- (Italy) Giulio Zeppieri

The following players received entry as lucky losers:

- (Portugal) João Domingues
- (Finland) Eero Vasa

== Champions ==
=== Singles ===
- (Chile) Cristian Garín def. (United States) Mitchell Krueger 7–6^{(7–3)}, 4–6, 6–2.

=== Doubles ===
- (Germany) Andreas Mies / (Spain) David Vega Hernández def. (Brazil) Marcelo Demoliner / (Austria) David Pichler 6–4, 6–4.
