= 2026 Open de Oeiras II – Doubles =

Doubles
- 2026 Open de Oeiras II

Final
- Champions: (India) Siddhant Banthia (Bulgaria) Alexander Donski
- Runners-up: (Portugal) Tiago Pereira (Spain) David Vega Hernández
- Score: 6–3, 6–2

Events
Singles	Doubles
- Open de Oeiras

Sriram Balaji and Neil Oberleitner were the defending champions but chose not to defend their title.

Siddhant Banthia and Alexander Donski won the title after defeating Tiago Pereira and David Vega Hernández 6–3, 6–2 in the final.

== Seeds ==
1. (New Zealand) Finn Reynolds / (New Zealand) James Watt (quarterfinals)
2. (Ecuador) Gonzalo Escobar / (Argentina) Mariano Kestelboim (semifinals)
3. Ivan Liutarevich / (Poland) Filip Pieczonka (semifinals)
4. (Canada) Cleeve Harper / (United Kingdom) David Stevenson (first round, withdrew)

== Draw ==
Key

- Q = Qualifier
- WC = Wild card
- LL = Lucky loser
- Alt = Alternate
- ITF = ITF entry
- PR = Protected ranking
- SR = Special ranking
- SE = Special exempt
- JE = Junior exempt
- JR = Junior Accelerator Programme entrant
- CO = College Accelerator Programme entrant
- NG = Next Gen Accelerator Program entrant
- w/o = Walkover
- r = Retired
- d = Defaulted

First round
1	(New Zealand) F Reynolds (New Zealand) J Watt	6	6
(India) VSP Natarajan (India) R Ramanathan	3	4
(Portugal) T Pereira (Spain) D Vega Hernández	w/o
(Chile) T Barrios Vera (Colombia) N Mejía
3	I Liutarevich (Poland) F Pieczonka	3	6	[10]
(Spain) B Pujol Navarro (Spain) B Winter López	6	1	[5]
(Romania) A Jecan (Romania) B Pavel	7	7
(United States) M Krueger (United States) M Zheng	5	5
(India) S Banthia (Bulgaria) A Donski	w/o
4	(Canada) C Harper (United Kingdom) D Stevenson
(United States) G Johns (Jordan) A Shelbayh
(United States) N Lammons (United States) J Withrow	w/o
WC	(Portugal) Francisco Rocha (Portugal) T Torres	3	6^{6}
2	(Ecuador) G Escobar (Argentina) M Kestelboim	6	7^{8}

Quarterfinals
1	(New Zealand) F Reynolds (New Zealand) J Watt	6^{3}	5
(Portugal) T Pereira (Spain) D Vega Hernández	7^{7}	7
3	I Liutarevich (Poland) F Pieczonka	6	7^{8}
(Australia) B Bayldon (Netherlands) M Veldheer	4	6^{6}
(Romania) A Jecan (Romania) B Pavel	4	4
(India) S Banthia (Bulgaria) A Donski	6	6
(United States) N Lammons (United States) J Withrow	4	6	[4]
2	(Ecuador) G Escobar (Argentina) M Kestelboim	6	1	[10]

Semifinals
(Portugal) T Pereira (Spain) D Vega Hernández	7	7^{7}
3	I Liutarevich (Poland) F Pieczonka	5	6^{5}
(India) S Banthia (Bulgaria) A Donski	6	6
2	(Ecuador) G Escobar (Argentina) M Kestelboim	1	3

Final
(Portugal) T Pereira (Spain) D Vega Hernández	3	2
(India) S Banthia (Bulgaria) A Donski	6	6
