= 2025 Open de Oeiras II – Doubles =

Doubles
- 2025 Open de Oeiras II

Final
- Champions: (Germany) Andreas Mies (Spain) David Vega Hernández
- Runners-up: (Brazil) Marcelo Demoliner (Austria) David Pichler
- Score: 6–4, 6–4

Events
Singles	Doubles
- Open de Oeiras

Karol Drzewiecki and Piotr Matuszewski were the defending champions, but only Matuszewski chose to defend his title, partnering Daniel Cukierman. They lost in the first round to Marcelo Demoliner and David Pichler.

Andreas Mies and David Vega Hernández won the title after defeating Demoliner and Pichler 6–4, 6–4 in the final.

== Seeds ==
1. (United States) Patrik Trhac / (United Kingdom) Marcus Willis (semifinals)
2. (Israel) Daniel Cukierman / (Poland) Piotr Matuszewski (first round)
3. (India) Anirudh Chandrasekar / (United Kingdom) David Stevenson (first round)
4. (Germany) Andreas Mies / (Spain) David Vega Hernández (champions)

== Draw ==
Key

- Q = Qualifier
- WC = Wild card
- LL = Lucky loser
- Alt = Alternate
- ITF = ITF entry
- PR = Protected ranking
- SR = Special ranking
- SE = Special exempt
- JE = Junior exempt
- JR = Junior Accelerator Programme entrant
- CO = College Accelerator Programme entrant
- NG = Next Gen Accelerator Program entrant
- w/o = Walkover
- r = Retired
- d = Defaulted

=== Draw ===
First round
1	(United States) P Trhac (United Kingdom) M Willis	6	6
(United States) T Boyer (Argentina) JP Ficovich	1	4
(United States) M Krueger (Japan) J Trotter	5	6	[10]
(Venezuela) LD Martínez (United Kingdom) J Paris	7	3	[8]
4	(Germany) A Mies (Spain) D Vega Hernández	1	6	[10]
(Italy) M Bortolotti (Colombia) C Rodríguez	6	3	[8]
WC	(Portugal) Pedro Araújo (Portugal) João Graça	w/o
WC	(Portugal) J Domingues (Portugal) G Elias
(Sweden) E Grevelius (Sweden) A Heinonen	3	7^{7}	[10]
(India) N Kaliyanda Poonacha (Brazil) M Zormann	6	6^{1}	[8]
(Spain) S Martos Gornés (India) VS Prashanth	6	7^{7}
3	(India) A Chandrasekar (United Kingdom) D Stevenson	4	6^{5}
(Netherlands) M Hermans (Portugal) T Pereira	4	2
(Czech Republic) Jiří Barnat (Czech Republic) F Duda	6	6
(Brazil) M Demoliner (Austria) D Pichler	6	3	[10]
2	(Israel) D Cukierman (Poland) P Matuszewski	2	6	[6]

Quarterfinals
1	(United States) P Trhac (United Kingdom) M Willis	3	6	[10]
(United States) M Krueger (Japan) J Trotter	6	4	[8]
4	(Germany) A Mies (Spain) D Vega Hernández	6^{3}	6	[11]
WC	(Portugal) P Araújo (Portugal) J Graça	7^{7}	3	[9]
(Sweden) E Grevelius (Sweden) A Heinonen	6	3	[5]
(Spain) S Martos Gornés (India) VS Prashanth	2	6	[10]
(Czech Republic) J Barnat (Czech Republic) F Duda	4	2
(Brazil) M Demoliner (Austria) D Pichler	6	6

Semifinals
1	(United States) P Trhac (United Kingdom) M Willis	4	2
4	(Germany) A Mies (Spain) D Vega Hernández	6	6
(Spain) S Martos Gornés (India) VS Prashanth	4	6^{8}
(Brazil) M Demoliner (Austria) D Pichler	6	7^{10}

Final
4	(Germany) A Mies (Spain) D Vega Hernández	6	6
(Brazil) M Demoliner (Austria) D Pichler	4	4
