= 2026 Open de Oeiras – Singles =

Singles
- 2026 Open de Oeiras

Final
- Champion: Roman Safiullin
- Runner-up: (France) Valentin Royer
- Score: 6–1, 6–2

Events
Singles	Doubles
- Open de Oeiras

Cristian Garín was the defending champion but chose not to defend his title.

Roman Safiullin won the title after defeating Valentin Royer 6–1, 6–2 in the final.

== Seeds ==
1. (France) Valentin Royer (final)
2. (Italy) Mattia Bellucci (first round)
3. (France) Luca Van Assche (second round)
4. (Argentina) Francisco Comesaña (first round)
5. (United States) Mackenzie McDonald (first round)
6. (Serbia) Dušan Lajović (second round)
7. (Portugal) Henrique Rocha (semifinals)
8. (Denmark) Elmer Møller (first round)

== Draw ==
Key

- Q = Qualifier
- WC = Wild card
- LL = Lucky loser
- Alt = Alternate
- ITF = ITF entry
- PR = Protected ranking
- SR = Special ranking
- SE = Special exempt
- JE = Junior exempt
- JR = Junior Accelerator Programme entrant
- CO = College Accelerator Programme entrant
- NG = Next Gen Accelerator Program entrant
- w/o = Walkover
- r = Retired
- d = Defaulted

=== Finals ===
Semifinals
1	(France) Valentin Royer	6	6
LL	(Netherlands) Max Houkes	2	3
Q	Roman Safiullin	6	6
7	(Portugal) Henrique Rocha	4	4

Final
1	(France) Valentin Royer	1	2
Q	Roman Safiullin	6	6

=== Top half ===
First round
1	(France) V Royer	6	1	6
Alt	(Italy) M Cecchinato	2	6	4
SE	(Austria) J Rodionov	6	1	6
(United Kingdom) B Harris	2	6	3
WC	(Portugal) G Elias	3	6	0
(Austria) J Schwärzler	6	3	6
(Chinese Taipei) C-h Tseng	6	7^{9}
5	(United States) M McDonald	1	6^{7}
4	(Argentina) F Comesaña	6	3	2
WC	(Portugal) F Ferreira Silva	3	6	6
(Tunisia) M Echargui	6	7^{7}
(Luxembourg) C Rodesch	4	6^{4}
LL	(Netherlands) M Houkes	6	6
Alt	(Czech Republic) Z Kolář	2	3
Q	(Switzerland) R Bertola	4	4
6	(Serbia) D Lajović	6	6

Second round
1	(France) V Royer	3	6	7
SE	(Austria) J Rodionov	6	4	5
(Austria) J Schwärzler	6	6
(Chinese Taipei) C-h Tseng	1	4
WC	(Portugal) F Ferreira Silva	6	6
(Tunisia) M Echargui	3	4
LL	(Netherlands) M Houkes	7^{7}	6
6	(Serbia) D Lajović	6^{1}	4

Quarterfinals
1	(France) V Royer	7	3	6
(Austria) J Schwärzler	5	6	3
WC	(Portugal) F Ferreira Silva	4	6	6^{2}
LL	(Netherlands) M Houkes	6	4	7^{7}

Semifinals
1	(France) V Royer	6	6
LL	(Netherlands) M Houkes	2	3

=== Bottom half ===
First round
8	(Denmark) E Møller	2	6	0
(Chile) N Jarry	6	3	6
(Netherlands) G den Ouden	7^{7}	2	4
(Portugal) J Faria	6^{1}	6	6
Q	(United Kingdom) F Gill	6	6^{5}	1^{r}
Q	R Safiullin	4	7^{7}	3
Alt	(Kazakhstan) T Skatov	1	4
3	(France) L Van Assche	6	6
7	(Portugal) H Rocha	7^{7}	7^{7}
Q	(Germany) T Gentzsch	6^{3}	6^{4}
LL	(Spain) A Moro Cañas	4	4
(Japan) R Sakamoto	6	6
Q	(Spain) P Llamas Ruiz	6	6
WC	(Portugal) T Pereira	2	2
Q	(Czech Republic) J Forejtek	6	7
2	(Italy) M Bellucci	3	5

Second round
(Chile) N Jarry
(Portugal) J Faria	w/o
Q	R Safiullin	7	3	6
3	(France) L Van Assche	5	6	2
7	(Portugal) H Rocha	7^{9}	7^{7}
(Japan) R Sakamoto	6^{7}	6^{4}
Q	(Spain) P Llamas Ruiz	7^{7}	6^{5}	6
Q	(Czech Republic) J Forejtek	6^{2}	7^{7}	4

Quarterfinals
(Portugal) J Faria	6	3	6^{1}
Q	R Safiullin	4	6	7^{7}
7	(Portugal) H Rocha	6	7
Q	(Spain) P Llamas Ruiz	0	5

Semifinals
Q	R Safiullin	6	6
7	(Portugal) H Rocha	4	4
