= 2022 Open de Oeiras II – Doubles =

Doubles
- 2022 Open de Oeiras II

Final
- Champions: (Portugal) Nuno Borges (Portugal) Francisco Cabral
- Runners-up: (Czech Republic) Zdeněk Kolář (Czech Republic) Adam Pavlásek
- Score: 6–4, 6–0

Events
Singles	Doubles
- Open de Oeiras

Nuno Borges and Francisco Cabral were the defending champions and successfully defended their title, defeating Zdeněk Kolář and Adam Pavlásek 6–4, 6–0 in the final.

== Seeds ==
1. (Portugal) Nuno Borges / (Portugal) Francisco Cabral (champions)
2. (Italy) Marco Bortolotti / (India) Arjun Kadhe (semifinals)
3. (Romania) Victor Vlad Cornea / (Germany) Fabian Fallert (semifinals)
4. (France) Tristan Lamasine / (France) Albano Olivetti (quarterfinals)

== Draw ==
Key

- Q = Qualifier
- WC = Wild card
- LL = Lucky loser
- Alt = Alternate
- ITF = ITF entry
- PR = Protected ranking
- SR = Special ranking
- SE = Special exempt
- JE = Junior exempt
- JR = Junior Accelerator Programme entrant
- CO = College Accelerator Programme entrant
- NG = Next Gen Accelerator Program entrant
- w/o = Walkover
- r = Retired
- d = Defaulted

First round
1	(Portugal) N Borges (Portugal) F Cabral	w/o
(Portugal) G Elias (Portugal) P Sousa
(Poland) S Walków (Poland) K Żuk	6	6
WC	(Portugal) J Faria (Portugal) Luís Faria	1	2
3	(Romania) VV Cornea (Germany) F Fallert	w/o
(Brazil) Oscar José Gutierrez (Romania) FC Jianu
(Uzbekistan) S Fayziev (Greece) M Kalovelonis	6	6
WC	(Portugal) Gonçalo Falcão (Portugal) H Rocha	3	2
(Germany) K Wehnelt (Germany) L Wessels	4	3
(Czech Republic) Z Kolář (Czech Republic) A Pavlásek	6	6
(Hungary) F Marozsán (Czech Republic) A Paulson	6^{5}	6	[7]
4	(France) T Lamasine (France) A Olivetti	7^{7}	3	[10]
(Czech Republic) M Gengel (Czech Republic) L Rosol	3	2
(Netherlands) G Smits (Kazakhstan) D Yevseyev	6	6
(Portugal) T Cação (Portugal) Fábio Coelho	3	3
2	(Italy) M Bortolotti (India) A Kadhe	6	6

Quarterfinals
1	(Portugal) N Borges (Portugal) F Cabral	7	6^{4}	[15]
(Poland) S Walków (Poland) K Żuk	5	7^{7}	[13]
3	(Romania) VV Cornea (Germany) F Fallert	6	6
(Uzbekistan) S Fayziev (Greece) M Kalovelonis	1	2
(Czech Republic) Z Kolář (Czech Republic) A Pavlásek	7^{7}	6
4	(France) T Lamasine (France) A Olivetti	6^{4}	4
(Netherlands) G Smits (Kazakhstan) D Yevseyev	6	3	[7]
2	(Italy) M Bortolotti (India) A Kadhe	4	6	[10]

Semifinals
1	(Portugal) N Borges (Portugal) F Cabral	6	6
3	(Romania) VV Cornea (Germany) F Fallert	4	4
(Czech Republic) Z Kolář (Czech Republic) A Pavlásek	6	7
2	(Italy) M Bortolotti (India) A Kadhe	2	5

Final
1	(Portugal) N Borges (Portugal) F Cabral	6	6
(Czech Republic) Z Kolář (Czech Republic) A Pavlásek	4	0
