= 2026 Open de Oeiras II =

- Date: 11–16 May
- Edition: 15th
- Surface: Clay
- Location: Oeiras, Portugal

Champions

Singles
- (Serbia) Laslo Djere

Doubles
- (India) Siddhant Banthia / (Bulgaria) Alexander Donski
- Open de Oeiras

The 2026 Open de Oeiras II was a professional tennis tournament played on clay courts. It was the 15th edition of the tournament which was part of the 2026 ATP Challenger Tour. It took place in Oeiras, Portugal between 11 and 16 May 2026.

== Singles main-draw entrants ==
=== Seeds ===
| Country | Player | Rank^{1} | Seed |
|---|---|---|---|
| CHI | Cristian Garín | 104 | 1 |
| USA | Emilio Nava | 108 | 2 |
| POR | Jaime Faria | 119 | 3 |
| POR | Henrique Rocha | 120 | 4 |
| LTU | Vilius Gaubas | 121 | 5 |
| BOL | Hugo Dellien | 133 | 6 |
| CHI | Tomás Barrios Vera | 134 | 7 |
| GBR | Jack Pinnington Jones | 137 | 8 |

- ^{1} Rankings are as of 4 May 2026.

=== Other entrants ===
The following players received wildcards into the singles main draw:

- (Portugal) Gastão Elias
- (Portugal) Frederico Ferreira Silva
- (Portugal) Tiago Pereira

The following players received entry into the singles main draw through the Next Gen Accelerator programme:

- (United States) Darwin Blanch
- (Czech Republic) Petr Brunclík

The following players received entry into the singles main draw as alternates:

- (Argentina) Lautaro Midón
- (Argentina) Genaro Alberto Olivieri
- (United States) Colton Smith

The following players received entry from the qualifying draw:

- (Serbia) Laslo Djere
- (Lebanon) Benjamin Hassan
- (Spain) David Jordà Sanchis
- (Portugal) Tiago Torres
- (Finland) Eero Vasa
- (China) Zhang Zhizhen

== Champions ==
=== Singles ===
- (Serbia) Laslo Djere def. (United States) Emilio Nava 6–3, 6–4.

=== Doubles ===
- (India) Siddhant Banthia / (Bulgaria) Alexander Donski def. (Portugal) Tiago Pereira / (Spain) David Vega Hernández 6–3, 6–2.
