= 2024 Open de Oeiras II =

- Date: 13–18 May
- Edition: 11th
- Surface: Clay
- Location: Oeiras, Portugal

Champions

Singles
- (Portugal) Jaime Faria

Doubles
- (India) Anirudh Chandrasekar / (India) Arjun Kadhe
← 2024 ·	Open de Oeiras	· 2025 →

The 2024 Open de Oeiras II was a professional tennis tournament played on clay courts. It was the 11th edition of the tournament which was part of the 2024 ATP Challenger Tour. It took place in Oeiras, Portugal between 13 and 18 May 2024.

== Singles main-draw entrants ==
=== Seeds ===
Country	Player	Rank^{1}	Seed
USA	Alex Michelsen	69	1
USA	Zachary Svajda	122	2
USA	Emilio Nava	124	3
CZE	Vít Kopřiva	127	4
RSA	Lloyd Harris	128	5
ARG	Román Andrés Burruchaga	149	6
USA	Patrick Kypson	150	7
JPN	Shintaro Mochizuki	157	8

- ^{1} Rankings are as of 6 May 2024.

=== Other entrants ===
The following players received wildcards into the singles main draw:

- (Portugal) Gastão Elias
- (Portugal) Jaime Faria
- (Portugal) Henrique Rocha

The following players received entry into the singles main draw as special exempts:

- (Italy) Jacopo Berrettini
- (Belgium) Gauthier Onclin

The following players received entry from the qualifying draw:

- (France) Dan Added
- (Bulgaria) Adrian Andreev
- (Portugal) Frederico Ferreira Silva
- (Argentina) Juan Pablo Ficovich
- (Austria) Lukas Neumayer
- (Kazakhstan) Dmitry Popko

== Champions ==
=== Singles ===
- (Portugal) Jaime Faria def. (Sweden) Elias Ymer 3–6, 7–6^{(7–3)}, 6–4.

=== Doubles ===
- (India) Anirudh Chandrasekar / (India) Arjun Kadhe def. (Sweden) Simon Freund / (Denmark) Johannes Ingildsen 7–5, 6–4.
