= 2024 Open de Oeiras =

- Date: 15–21 April
- Edition: 10th
- Surface: Clay
- Location: Oeiras, Portugal

Champions

Singles
- (Argentina) Francisco Comesaña

Doubles
- (Sweden) Filip Bergevi / (Netherlands) Mick Veldheer
← 2023 ·	Open de Oeiras	· 2024 →

The 2024 Open de Oeiras was a professional tennis tournament played on clay courts. It was the tenth edition of the tournament which was part of the 2024 ATP Challenger Tour 125. It took place in Oeiras, Portugal between 15 and 21 April 2024.

== Singles main-draw entrants ==
=== Seeds ===
Country	Player	Rank^{1}	Seed
ITA	Fabio Fognini	94	1
BRA	Thiago Monteiro	113	2
~~HUN~~	~~Zsombor Piros~~	~~114~~	~~3~~
ARG	Francisco Comesaña	116	4
USA	Emilio Nava	125	5
FRA	Térence Atmane	133	6
USA	Nicolas Moreno de Alboran	134	7
ARG	Juan Manuel Cerúndolo	152	8
NED	Jesper de Jong	155	9

- ^{1} Rankings are as of 8 April 2024.

=== Other entrants ===
The following players received wildcards into the singles main draw:

- (Portugal) Gastão Elias
- (Portugal) Jaime Faria
- (Portugal) Frederico Ferreira Silva

The following players received entry into the singles main draw as special exempts:

- (Slovakia) Jozef Kovalík
- (Italy) Stefano Napolitano

The following players received entry from the qualifying draw:

- (Bulgaria) Adrian Andreev
- (France) Mathys Erhard
- (Belgium) Gauthier Onclin
- (France) Valentin Royer
- (Chinese Taipei) Tseng Chun-hsin
- (Italy) Samuel Vincent Ruggeri

The following player received entry as a lucky loser:

- (Poland) Maks Kaśnikowski

== Champions ==
=== Singles ===
- (Argentina) Francisco Comesaña def. (France) Ugo Blanchet 6–4, 3–6, 7–5.

=== Doubles ===
- (Sweden) Filip Bergevi / (Netherlands) Mick Veldheer def. (Spain) Sergio Martos Gornés / (Greece) Petros Tsitsipas 6–1, 6–4.
