= 2024 Open de Oeiras II – Doubles =

Doubles
- 2024 Open de Oeiras II

Final
- Champions: (India) Anirudh Chandrasekar (India) Arjun Kadhe
- Runners-up: (Sweden) Simon Freund (Denmark) Johannes Ingildsen
- Score: 7–5, 6–4

Events
Singles	Doubles
- Open de Oeiras

Filip Bergevi and Mick Veldheer were the defending champions but lost in the semifinals to Simon Freund and Johannes Ingildsen.

Anirudh Chandrasekar and Arjun Kadhe won the title after defeating Freund and Ingildsen 7–5, 6–4 in the final.

== Seeds ==
1. (India) Anirudh Chandrasekar / (India) Arjun Kadhe (champions)
2. (United States) Christian Harrison / (France) Fabrice Martin (quarterfinals)
3. (Sweden) Filip Bergevi / (Netherlands) Mick Veldheer (semifinals)
4. (France) Dan Added / (United States) George Goldhoff (first round, retired)

== Draw ==
Key

- Q = Qualifier
- WC = Wild card
- LL = Lucky loser
- Alt = Alternate
- ITF = ITF entry
- PR = Protected ranking
- SR = Special ranking
- SE = Special exempt
- JE = Junior exempt
- JR = Junior Accelerator Programme entrant
- CO = College Accelerator Programme entrant
- NG = Next Gen Accelerator Program entrant
- w/o = Walkover
- r = Retired
- d = Defaulted

=== Draw ===
First round
1	(India) A Chandrasekar (India) A Kadhe	7^{7}	6
(Brazil) G Heide (Brazil) Gabriel Roveri Sidney	6^{5}	3
(Kazakhstan) D Popko (Kazakhstan) B Zhukayev	6	2	[11]
WC	(Portugal) T Pereira (Portugal) D Vale	3	6	[9]
4	(France) D Added (United States) G Goldhoff	6^{6}	1^{r}
WC	(Portugal) Pedro Araújo (Portugal) J Domingues	7^{8}	3
(Germany) J Schnaitter (Germany) M Wallner	6^{5}	6^{5}
(Czech Republic) F Duda (Czech Republic) V Kopřiva	7^{7}	7^{7}
I Liutarevich (Spain) D Vega Hernández	2	3
(Romania) A Jecan (Greece) M Kalovelonis	6	6
Alt	(Czech Republic) J Forejtek (Czech Republic) D Svrčina	7	3	[1]
3	(Sweden) F Bergevi (Netherlands) M Veldheer	5	6	[10]
(United States) M Kiger (United States) A Lawson	2	6	[6]
(Sweden) S Freund (Denmark) J Ingildsen	6	3	[10]
(Poland) K Drzewiecki (Poland) S Walków	2	1
2	(United States) C Harrison (France) F Martin	6	6

Quarterfinals
1	(India) A Chandrasekar (India) A Kadhe	6	6
(Kazakhstan) D Popko (Kazakhstan) B Zhukayev	3	3
WC	(Portugal) P Araújo (Portugal) J Domingues	2	6	[10]
(Czech Republic) F Duda (Czech Republic) V Kopřiva	6	4	[7]
(Romania) A Jecan (Greece) M Kalovelonis	3	4
3	(Sweden) F Bergevi (Netherlands) M Veldheer	6	6
(Sweden) S Freund (Denmark) J Ingildsen	5	6	[10]
2	(United States) C Harrison (France) F Martin	7	1	[5]

Semifinals
1	(India) A Chandrasekar (India) A Kadhe	6	7^{8}
WC	(Portugal) P Araújo (Portugal) J Domingues	4	6^{6}
3	(Sweden) F Bergevi (Netherlands) M Veldheer	6^{2}	6	[8]
(Sweden) S Freund (Denmark) J Ingildsen	7^{7}	4	[10]

Final
1	(India) A Chandrasekar (India) A Kadhe	7	6
(Sweden) S Freund (Denmark) J Ingildsen	5	4
