= 2022 Open de Oeiras III – Singles =

Singles
- 2022 Open de Oeiras III

Final
- Champion: (Japan) Kaichi Uchida
- Runner-up: (Belgium) Kimmer Coppejans
- Score: 6–2, 6–4

Events
Singles	Doubles
- Open de Oeiras

Gastão Elias was the three-time defending champion but chose not to defend his title.

Kaichi Uchida won the title after defeating Kimmer Coppejans 6–2, 6–4 in the final.

== Seeds ==
1. (Spain) Roberto Carballés Baena (first round)
2. (Argentina) Facundo Bagnis (semifinals)
3. (Chile) Nicolás Jarry (semifinals)
4. (Brazil) Daniel Dutra da Silva (first round)
5. Evgeny Karlovskiy (first round)
6. (Japan) Kaichi Uchida (champion)
7. (Switzerland) Johan Nikles (second round)
8. (France) Laurent Lokoli (first round)

== Draw ==
Key

- Q = Qualifier
- WC = Wild card
- LL = Lucky loser
- Alt = Alternate
- ITF = ITF entry
- PR = Protected ranking
- SR = Special ranking
- SE = Special exempt
- JE = Junior exempt
- JR = Junior Accelerator Programme entrant
- CO = College Accelerator Programme entrant
- NG = Next Gen Accelerator Program entrant
- w/o = Walkover
- r = Retired
- d = Defaulted

=== Finals ===
Semifinals
(Belgium) Kimmer Coppejans	7^{11}	4	7^{7}
3	(Chile) Nicolás Jarry	6^{9}	6	6^{5}
6	(Japan) Kaichi Uchida	7	7^{7}
2	(Argentina) Facundo Bagnis	5	6^{4}

Final
(Belgium) Kimmer Coppejans	2	4
6	(Japan) Kaichi Uchida	6	6

=== Top half ===
First round
1	(Spain) R Carballés Baena	4	5
(Belgium) K Coppejans	6	7
(Canada) S Diez	2	6	6
(Germany) S Fanselow	6	1	4
(Lebanon) B Hassan	4	4
(Poland) D Michalski	6	6
WC	(Portugal) Pedro Araújo	3	7	7
8	(France) L Lokoli	6	5	5
3	(Chile) N Jarry	6	6
(Spain) Eduard Esteve Lobato	4	4
(Portugal) G Oliveira	6	5	6
Q	(Brazil) T Bellucci	4	7	1
(Spain) O Roca Batalla	4	4
Q	(Brazil) Oscar José Gutierrez	6	6
Alt	(France) K Jacquet	6	6
5	E Karlovskiy	3	4

Second round
(Belgium) K Coppejans	7	6
(Canada) S Diez	5	1
(Poland) D Michalski	6	6
WC	(Portugal) P Araújo	3	3
3	(Chile) N Jarry	6	6
(Portugal) G Oliveira	3	3
Q	(Brazil) OJ Gutierrez	4	3
Alt	(France) K Jacquet	6	6

Quarterfinals
(Belgium) K Coppejans	5	7^{7}	6
(Poland) D Michalski	7	6^{2}	3
3	(Chile) N Jarry	7^{9}	4	7^{8}
Alt	(France) K Jacquet	6^{7}	6	6^{6}

Semifinals
(Belgium) K Coppejans	7^{11}	4	7^{7}
3	(Chile) N Jarry	6^{9}	6	6^{5}

=== Bottom half ===
First round
6	(Japan) K Uchida	6	6
(Germany) L Wessels	4	1
WC	(Portugal) T Cação	7^{9}	2	4
(Germany) T Kamke	6^{7}	6	6
(Spain) C Gimeno Valero	6^{4}	6	5
WC	(Portugal) J Domingues	7^{7}	4	7
(Belgium) M Geerts	6	6
4	(Brazil) D Dutra da Silva	2	4
7	(Switzerland) J Nikles	4	6	6
(Turkey) E Kırkın	6	3	0
Q	(United States) A Rybakov	6	7
Q	(Brazil) P Boscardin Dias	3	5
Q	(Bulgaria) A Lazarov	6	2	4
(Spain) N Sánchez Izquierdo	2	6	6
Q	(Germany) Lucas Gerch	6	6^{3}	3
2	(Argentina) F Bagnis	3	7^{7}	6

Second round
6	(Japan) K Uchida	6	0
(Germany) T Kamke	3	0^{r}
WC	(Portugal) J Domingues	1	4
(Belgium) M Geerts	6	6
7	(Switzerland) J Nikles	6	4	3
Q	(United States) A Rybakov	4	6	6
(Spain) N Sánchez Izquierdo	4	2
2	(Argentina) F Bagnis	6	6

Quarterfinals
6	(Japan) K Uchida	4	6	6
(Belgium) M Geerts	6	1	4
Q	(United States) A Rybakov	4	6	3
2	(Argentina) F Bagnis	6	2	6

Semifinals
6	(Japan) K Uchida	7	7^{7}
2	(Argentina) F Bagnis	5	6^{4}
