= 2024 Open de Oeiras II – Singles =

Singles
- 2024 Open de Oeiras II

Final
- Champion: (Portugal) Jaime Faria
- Runner-up: (Sweden) Elias Ymer
- Score: 3–6, 7–6^{(7–3)}, 6–4

Events
| Singles | Doubles |
- Open de Oeiras

Francisco Comesaña was the defending champion but chose not to defend his title.

Jaime Faria won the title after defeating Elias Ymer 3–6, 7–6^{(7–3)}, 6–4 in the final.

== Seeds ==
1. (United States) Alex Michelsen (second round)
2. (United States) Zachary Svajda (first round)
3. (United States) Emilio Nava (second round)
4. (Czech Republic) Vít Kopřiva (second round)
5. (South Africa) Lloyd Harris (second round)
6. (Argentina) Román Andrés Burruchaga (semifinals)
7. (United States) Patrick Kypson (second round)
8. (Japan) Shintaro Mochizuki (first round)

== Draw ==
Key

- Q = Qualifier
- WC = Wild card
- LL = Lucky loser
- Alt = Alternate
- ITF = ITF entry
- PR = Protected ranking
- SR = Special ranking
- SE = Special exempt
- JE = Junior exempt
- JR = Junior Accelerator Programme entrant
- CO = College Accelerator Programme entrant
- NG = Next Gen Accelerator Program entrant
- w/o = Walkover
- r = Retired
- d = Defaulted

=== Finals ===
Semifinals
WC | (Portugal) Jaime Faria | 6 | 6^{5} | 6
6 | (Argentina) Román Andrés Burruchaga | 4 | 7^{7} | 1
(Kazakhstan) Denis Yevseyev | 5 | 2
(Sweden) Elias Ymer | 7 | 6

Final
WC | (Portugal) Jaime Faria | 3 | 7^{7} | 6
(Sweden) Elias Ymer | 6 | 6^{3} | 4

=== Top half ===
First round
1 | (United States) A Michelsen | 4 | 6 | 6
WC | (Portugal) H Rocha | 6 | 3 | 4
(Austria) D Novak | 6 | 1
Q | (France) D Added | 0 | 0^{r}
(Brazil) G Heide | 6 | 6
Q | (Kazakhstan) D Popko | 1 | 2
WC | (Portugal) J Faria | 6 | 6
8 | (Japan) S Mochizuki | 2 | 4
4 | (Czech Republic) V Kopřiva | 6 | 7
Q | (Argentina) JP Ficovich | 2 | 5
WC | (Portugal) G Elias | 4 | 6 | 3
(Belgium) J De Loore | 6 | 4 | 6
(Argentina) JM Cerúndolo | 6 | 6^{2} | 0^{r}
(Czech Republic) D Svrčina | 4 | 7^{7} | 2
Q | (Bulgaria) A Andreev | 6^{6} | 3
6 | (Argentina) RA Burruchaga | 7^{8} | 6

Second round
1 | (United States) A Michelsen | 6^{3} | 4
(Austria) D Novak | 7^{7} | 6
(Brazil) G Heide | 4 | 4
WC | (Portugal) J Faria | 6 | 6
4 | (Czech Republic) V Kopřiva | 4 | 6 | 3
(Belgium) J De Loore | 6 | 1 | 6
(Czech Republic) D Svrčina | 3 | 4
6 | (Argentina) RA Burruchaga | 6 | 6

Quarterfinals
(Austria) D Novak | 6 | 4 | 0
WC | (Portugal) J Faria | 2 | 6 | 6
(Belgium) J De Loore | 3 | 0^{r}
6 | (Argentina) RA Burruchaga | 6 | 2

Semifinals
WC | (Portugal) J Faria | 6 | 6^{5} | 6
6 | (Argentina) RA Burruchaga | 4 | 7^{7} | 1

=== Bottom half ===
First round
7 | (United States) P Kypson | 6 | 6
(Hong Kong) C Wong | 3 | 1
SE | (Belgium) G Onclin | 6^{3} | 6^{7}
(Kazakhstan) B Zhukayev | 7^{7} | 7^{9}
Q | (Austria) L Neumayer | 6 | 5 | 0
(Kazakhstan) D Yevseyev | 3 | 7 | 6
SE | (Italy) J Berrettini | 7^{7} | 4 | 5
3 | (United States) E Nava | 6^{2} | 6 | 7
5 | (South Africa) L Harris | 7 | 7^{8}
Q | (Portugal) F Ferreira Silva | 5 | 6^{6}
(Sweden) E Ymer | 6 | 6
(United States) E Quinn | 3 | 4
(United States) T Boyer | 6^{8} | 7^{7} | 6
(United States) Dar Blanch | 7^{10} | 6^{0} | 3
(United Kingdom) J Choinski | 6 | 6
2 | (United States) Z Svajda | 3 | 0

Second round
7 | (United States) P Kypson | 5 | 6^{5}
(Kazakhstan) B Zhukayev | 7 | 7^{7}
(Kazakhstan) D Yevseyev | 7^{10} | 6
3 | (United States) E Nava | 6^{8} | 0
5 | (South Africa) L Harris | 5 | 3
(Sweden) E Ymer | 7 | 6
(United States) T Boyer | 4 | 5
(United Kingdom) J Choinski | 6 | 7

Quarterfinals
(Kazakhstan) B Zhukayev | 4 | 6 | 3
(Kazakhstan) D Yevseyev | 6 | 2 | 6
(Sweden) E Ymer | 6 | 1 | 6
(United Kingdom) J Choinski | 2 | 6 | 4

Semifinals
(Kazakhstan) D Yevseyev | 5 | 2
(Sweden) E Ymer | 7 | 6
