= Simon Freund =

Swedish tennis player

- Country (sports): Sweden
- Born: 28 September 1996 (age 30) Stockholm, Sweden
- Height: 1.78 m (5 ft 10 in)
- Retired: 2024
- Plays: Right-handed (two-handed backhand)
- College: UCSB
- Coach: Kalle Engström
- Prize money: US $55,198

Singles
- Career record: 0–0 (at ATP Tour level, Grand Slam level, and in Davis Cup)
- Career titles: 0 ITF
- Highest ranking: No. 677 (16 November 2020)

Doubles
- Career record: 0–3 (at ATP Tour level, Grand Slam level, and in Davis Cup)
- Career titles: 1 Challenger, 17 ITF
- Highest ranking: No. 164 (9 September 2024)

Simon Freund (born 28 September 1996) is a Swedish former professional tennis player. He has a career-high ATP singles ranking of No. 677 achieved on 16 November 2020 and a career-high doubles ranking of No. 164 achieved on 9 September 2024.

Freund played college tennis at Louisiana State University and thereafter at University of California, Santa Barbara.

== Career ==
Freund made his ATP main draw debut at the 2021 Stockholm Open after entering the doubles main draw as an alternate with Nino Serdarušić. He won his first ATP Challenger title at the 2024 Tallahassee Tennis Challenger.

== ATP Challenger and ITF World Tennis Tour Finals ==
=== Singles: 1 (0–1) ===
Legend (singles) ATP Challenger Tour (0–0) ITF World Tennis Tour (3–1)	Titles by surface Hard (0–0) Clay (0–1) Grass (0–0) Carpet (0–0)

Result	W–L	Date	Tournament	Tier	Surface	Opponent	Score
Loss	0–1	Jul 2019	M15 Pittsburgh, United States	World Tennis Tour	Clay	(Moldova) Alexandr Cozbinov	6–2, 2–6, 1–6

=== Doubles 19 (12–7) ===
Legend (doubles) ATP Challenger Tour (1–2) ITF World Tennis Tour (10–6)	Titles by surface Hard (7–3) Clay (5–4) Grass (0–0) Carpet (0–0)

Result	W–L	Date	Tournament	Tier	Surface	Partner	Opponents	Score
Loss	0–1	May 2019	M15 Karlskrona, Sweden	World Tennis Tour	Clay	(United States) Justin Butsch	(Sweden) Filip Bergevi (Sweden) Markus Eriksson	1–6, 3–6
Loss	0–2	May 2019	M15 Kalmar, Sweden	World Tennis Tour	Clay	(United States) Justin Butsch	(Sweden) Filip Bergevi (Sweden) Markus Eriksson	5–7, 2–6
Win	1–2	Sep 2019	(Brazil) M15 São Brás de Alportel, Portugal	World Tennis Tour	Hard	(United States) Nicolas Moreno de Alboran	(Portugal) Francisco Cabral (United Kingdom) Luke Johnson	5–7, 6–4, [10–7]
Win	2–2	Dec 2019	M15 Doha, Qatar	World Tennis Tour	Hard	(Sweden) Jonathan Mridha	(Belgium) Zizou Bergs (Georgia (country)) Zura Tkemaladze	6–1, 6–0
Loss	2–3	Feb 2020	M25 Glasgow, United Kingdom	World Tennis Tour	Hard	(United Kingdom) Evan Hoyt	(Poland) Jan Zieliński (Poland) Szymon Walków	1–6, 1–6
Win	3–3	Apr 2021	Russia M15, St. Petersburg	World Tennis Tour	Hard (i)	(Moldova) Alexandr Cozbinov	(Japan) Naoki Tajima (Russia) Alexey Zakharov	6–4, 7–5
Win	4–3	Apr 2021	Russia M15, St. Petersburg	World Tennis Tour	Hard (i)	(Moldova) Alexandr Cozbinov	(Japan) Naoki Tajima (Russia) Alexey Zakharov	7–6^{(7–5)}, 2–6, [10–6]
Win	5–3	May 2022	M25 Kalmar, Sweden	World Tennis Tour	Clay	(Denmark) Johannes Ingildsen	(Sweden) Timothy Carlsson Seger (Sweden) Isac Strömberg	6–1, 6–1
Win	6–3	Jun 2022	M25 Skopje, North Macedonia	World Tennis Tour	Clay	(Denmark) Johannes Ingildsen	(Sweden) Filip Bergevi (Tunisia) Moez Echargui	7–5, 6–3
Win	7–3	Jul 2022	(Slovakia) M25 Poprad, Slovak Republic	World Tennis Tour	Clay	(Denmark) Johannes Ingildsen	(Slovakia) Miloš Karol (Slovakia) Lukáš Pokorný	6–4, 6–2
Loss	7–4	Jan 2023	(United Kingdom) M25 Sheffield, UK	World Tennis Tour	Hard (i)	(France) Corentin Denolly	(United Kingdom) Scott Duncan (United Kingdom) Marcus Willis	3–6, 4–6
Win	8–4	Jul 2023	M15 Vejle, Denmark	World Tennis Tour	Clay	(Denmark) Johannes Ingildsen	(Denmark) Carl Emil Overbeck (Denmark) Oskar Brostrøm Poulsen	6–2, 6–3
Win	8–4	Sep 2023	M25 Falun, Sweden	World Tennis Tour	Hard	(Denmark) Johannes Ingildsen	(United Kingdom) Anton Matusevich (United Kingdom) Harry Wendelken	7–6 ^{(7–2)}, 4–6, [10–7]
Win	10–4	Oct 2023	M25 Tavira, Portugal	World Tennis Tour	Hard	(Denmark) Johannes Ingildsen	(Portugal) Joao Domingues (Portugal) Goncalo Falcao	6–4, 4–6, [10–5]
Win	11–4	Jan 2024	M25 Ithaca, United States	World Tennis Tour	Hard (i)	(Denmark) Johannes Ingildsen	(United States) Joshua Sheehy (United States) Pranav Kumar	6–4, 7–6^{(7–4)}
Loss	11–5	Mar 2024	M25 Faro, Portugal	World Tennis Tour	Hard	(Denmark) Johannes Ingildsen	(Bulgaria) Alexander Donski (Portugal) Tiago Pereira	4–6, 6–3, [7–10]
Win	12–5	Apr 2024	(United States) Tallahassee, USA	Challenger	Clay	(Denmark) Johannes Ingildsen	(Venezuela) Luis David Martínez (United States) William Blumberg	7–5, 7–6^{(7–4)}
Loss	12–6	Apr 2024	Savannah, United States	Challenger	Clay	(Denmark) Johannes Ingildsen	(United States) Christian Harrison (United Kingdom) Marcus Willis	3–6, 3–6
Loss	12-7	May 2024	Oeiras, Portugal	Challenger	Clay	(Denmark) Johannes Ingildsen	(India) Anirudh Chandrasekar (India) Arjun Kadhe	5–7, 4–6
