= 2023 Open de Oeiras II – Singles =

Singles
- 2023 Open de Oeiras II

Final
- Champion: (Argentina) Facundo Díaz Acosta
- Runner-up: (Australia) Aleksandar Vukic
- Score: 6–4, 6–3

Events
| Singles | Doubles |
- Open de Oeiras

Zsombor Piros was the defending champion but chose not to defend his title.

Facundo Díaz Acosta won the title after defeating Aleksandar Vukic 6–4, 6–3 in the final.

== Seeds ==
1. (Argentina) Pedro Cachin (quarterfinals)
2. (France) Hugo Gaston (first round, retired)
3. (Moldova) Radu Albot (quarterfinals)
4. (Ecuador) Emilio Gómez (first round)
5. (Argentina) Facundo Bagnis (first round)
6. (Australia) Aleksandar Vukic (final)
7. (Argentina) Facundo Díaz Acosta (champion)
8. (Australia) Rinky Hijikata (first round)

== Draw ==
Key

- Q = Qualifier
- WC = Wild card
- LL = Lucky loser
- Alt = Alternate
- ITF = ITF entry
- PR = Protected ranking
- SR = Special ranking
- SE = Special exempt
- JE = Junior exempt
- JR = Junior Accelerator Programme entrant
- CO = College Accelerator Programme entrant
- NG = Next Gen Accelerator Program entrant
- w/o = Walkover
- r = Retired
- d = Defaulted

=== Finals ===
Semifinals
(United States) Nicolas Moreno de Alboran | 6^{9} | 2
7 | (Argentina) Facundo Díaz Acosta | 7^{11} | 6
6 | (Australia) Aleksandar Vukic | 5 | 6 | 6
(Brazil) Felipe Meligeni Alves | 7 | 4 | 4

Final
7 | (Argentina) Facundo Díaz Acosta | 6 | 6
6 | (Australia) Aleksandar Vukic | 4 | 3

=== Top half ===
First round
1 | (Argentina) P Cachin | 5 | 7^{7} | 6
Q | (Brazil) E Ribeiro | 7 | 6^{5} | 3
(Bolivia) H Dellien | 6 | 6
I Gakhov | 1 | 3
(United States) N Moreno de Alboran | 6 | 2 | 6
Alt | (Argentina) F Delbonis | 2 | 6 | 1
(United States) S Johnson | 1 | 7^{7} | 6
8 | (Australia) R Hijikata | 6 | 6^{3} | 1
3 | (Moldova) R Albot | 6 | 6
Alt | (Bulgaria) A Andreev | 1 | 3
(United Kingdom) J Choinski | 6 | 4 | 6
Q | (Italy) A Giannessi | 3 | 6 | 4
Q | (United States) U Blanch | 6 | 7^{7}
WC | (Portugal) P Sousa | 2 | 6^{4}
(United States) Em Nava | 1 | 6^{3}
7 | (Argentina) F Díaz Acosta | 6 | 7^{7}

Second round
1 | (Argentina) P Cachin | 6 | 6
(Bolivia) H Dellien | 4 | 2
(United States) N Moreno de Alboran | 6 | 6
(United States) S Johnson | 3 | 0
3 | (Moldova) R Albot | 7^{7} | 6
(United Kingdom) J Choinski | 6^{3} | 4
Q | (United States) U Blanch | 4 | 5
7 | (Argentina) F Díaz Acosta | 6 | 7

Quarterfinals
1 | (Argentina) P Cachin | 1 | 4
(United States) N Moreno de Alboran | 6 | 6
3 | (Moldova) R Albot | 2 | 2
7 | (Argentina) F Díaz Acosta | 6 | 6

Semifinals
(United States) N Moreno de Alboran | 6^{9} | 2
7 | (Argentina) F Díaz Acosta | 7^{11} | 6

=== Bottom half ===
First round
6 | (Australia) A Vukic | 7^{7} | 6
WC | (Portugal) F Ferreira Silva | 6^{3} | 3
(South Korea) G Campaña Lee | 6 | 6
Q | (France) M Guinard | 3 | 2
(Spain) M Landaluce | 5 | 1
(Switzerland) A Ritschard | 7 | 6
Q | (Hungary) M Valkusz | 6 | 6
4 | (Ecuador) E Gómez | 0 | 1
5 | (Argentina) F Bagnis | 4 | 4
(Ukraine) O Krutykh | 6 | 6
(Brazil) F Meligeni Alves | 6 | 6
(Italy) R Brancaccio | 1 | 2
WC | (Portugal) J Domingues | 6 | 0 | 2
Q | (Croatia) N Serdarušić | 4 | 6 | 6
(Spain) P Martínez | 6 | 3
2 | (France) H Gaston | 3 | 0^{r}

Second round
6 | (Australia) A Vukic | 6 | 4 | 6
(South Korea) G Campaña Lee | 4 | 6 | 3
(Switzerland) A Ritschard | 6 | 6
Q | (Hungary) M Valkusz | 3 | 0
(Ukraine) O Krutykh | 6^{2} | 6^{4}
(Brazil) F Meligeni Alves | 7^{7} | 7^{7}
Q | (Croatia) N Serdarušić | 3 | 6^{5}
(Spain) P Martínez | 6 | 7^{7}

Quarterfinals
6 | (Australia) A Vukic | 7 | 6
(Switzerland) A Ritschard | 5 | 3
(Brazil) F Meligeni Alves | 7 | 6
(Spain) P Martínez | 5 | 3

Semifinals
6 | (Australia) A Vukic | 5 | 6 | 6
(Brazil) F Meligeni Alves | 7 | 4 | 4
