= 2026 Open de Oeiras =

- Date: 13–19 April
- Edition: 14th
- Surface: Clay
- Location: Oeiras, Portugal

Champions

Singles
- Roman Safiullin

Doubles
- (India) Sriram Balaji / (Austria) Neil Oberleitner
- Open de Oeiras

The 2026 Open de Oeiras was a professional tennis tournament played on clay courts. It was the 14th edition of the tournament which was part of the 2026 ATP Challenger Tour. It took place in Oeiras, Portugal between 13 and 19 April 2026.

== Singles main-draw entrants ==
=== Seeds ===
Country	Player	Rank^{1}	Seed
FRA	Valentin Royer	73	1
ITA	Mattia Bellucci	79	2
FRA	Luca Van Assche	94	3
ARG	Francisco Comesaña	99	4
USA	Mackenzie McDonald	126	5
SRB	Dušan Lajović	128	6
POR	Henrique Rocha	129	7
DEN	Elmer Møller	131	8

- ^{1} Rankings are as of 6 April 2026.

=== Other entrants ===
The following players received wildcards into the singles main draw:

- (Portugal) Gastão Elias
- (Portugal) Frederico Ferreira Silva
- (Portugal) Tiago Pereira

The following player received entry into the singles main draw as a special exempt:

- (Austria) Jurij Rodionov

The following players received entry into the singles main draw as alternates:

- (Italy) Marco Cecchinato
- (Czech Republic) Zdeněk Kolář
- (Kazakhstan) Timofey Skatov

The following players received entry from the qualifying draw:

- (Switzerland) Rémy Bertola
- (Czech Republic) Jonáš Forejtek
- (Germany) Tom Gentzsch
- (United Kingdom) Felix Gill
- (Spain) Pablo Llamas Ruiz
- Roman Safiullin

The following players received entry as lucky losers:

- (Netherlands) Max Houkes
- (Spain) Alejandro Moro Cañas

== Champions ==
=== Singles ===
- Roman Safiullin def. (France) Valentin Royer 6–1, 6–2.

=== Doubles ===
- (India) Sriram Balaji / (Austria) Neil Oberleitner def. (Colombia) Nicolás Barrientos / (Uruguay) Ariel Behar 6–7^{(7–9)}, 6–4, [11–9].
