= 2023 Open de Oeiras =

- Date: 17–23 April
- Edition: 8th
- Surface: Clay
- Location: Oeiras, Portugal

Champions

Singles
- (Hungary) Zsombor Piros

Doubles
- (Romania) Victor Vlad Cornea / (Croatia) Franko Škugor
- Open de Oeiras

The 2023 Open de Oeiras was a professional tennis tournament played on clay courts. It was the eighth edition of the tournament which was part of the 2023 ATP Challenger Tour. It took place in Oeiras, Portugal between 17 and 23 April 2023.

== Singles main-draw entrants ==
=== Seeds ===
Country	Player	Rank^{1}	Seed
FRA	Adrian Mannarino	47	1
FRA	Alexandre Müller	96	2
AUT	Sebastian Ofner	120	3
ARG	Juan Manuel Cerúndolo	123	4
POR	João Sousa	146	5
JPN	Kaichi Uchida	160	6
HUN	Zsombor Piros	167	7
ITA	Andrea Vavassori	176	8

- ^{1} Rankings are as of 10 April 2023.

=== Other entrants ===
The following players received wildcards into the singles main draw:

- (Portugal) Henrique Rocha
- (Portugal) Pedro Sousa
- (Portugal) Duarte Vale

The following player received entry into the singles main draw as a special exempt:

- (Hungary) Zsombor Piros

The following player received entry into the singles main draw as an alternate:

- (Portugal) João Domingues

The following players received entry from the qualifying draw:

- (Romania) Cezar Crețu
- (Portugal) Jaime Faria
- (United Kingdom) Billy Harris
- (Spain) Pablo Llamas Ruiz
- (Spain) Daniel Mérida
- (Czech Republic) Petr Nouza

The following player received entry as a lucky loser:

- (Germany) Henri Squire

== Champions ==
=== Singles ===
- (Hungary) Zsombor Piros def. (Argentina) Juan Manuel Cerúndolo 6–3, 6–4.

=== Doubles ===
- (Romania) Victor Vlad Cornea / (Croatia) Franko Škugor def. (Brazil) Marcelo Demoliner / (Italy) Andrea Vavassori 7–6^{(7–2)}, 7–6^{(7–4)}.
