= Francisco Cabral (tennis) =

Portuguese tennis player (born 1997)

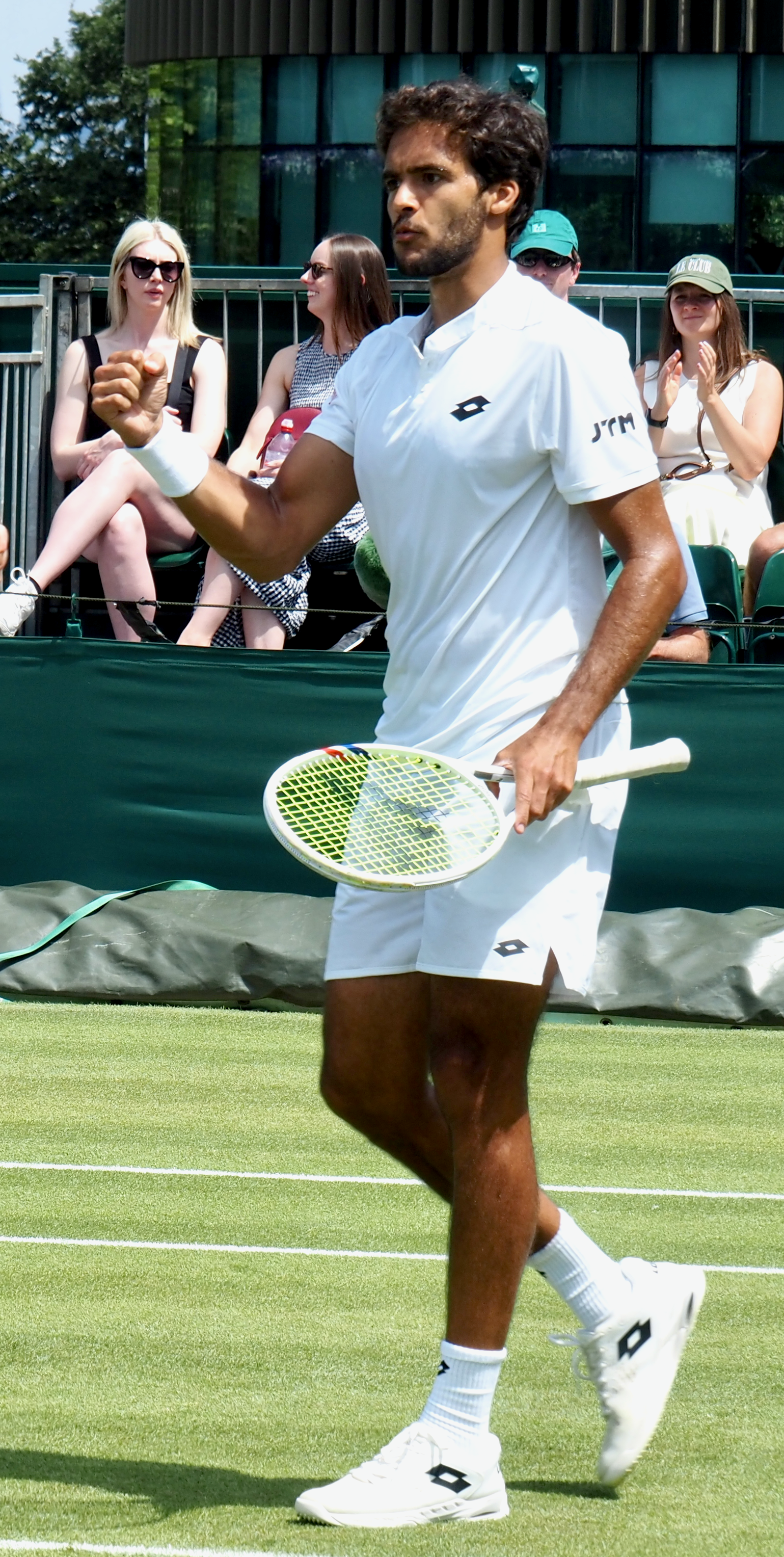
- Cabral at the 2026 Wimbledon Championships
- Country (sports): Portugal
- Born: 8 January 1997 (age 29) Porto, Portugal
- Height: 1.91 m (6 ft 3 in)
- Turned pro: 2015
- Plays: Right-handed (two-handed backhand)
- Prize money: US $1,081,466

Singles
- Career record: 0–1
- Career titles: 0
- Highest ranking: No. 862 (5 March 2018)

Other tournaments
- Olympic Games: 1R (2024)

Doubles
- Career record: 110–93
- Career titles: 7
- Highest ranking: No. 19 (12 January 2026)
- Current ranking: No. 25 (29 June 2026)

Grand Slam doubles results
- Australian Open: QF (2025)
- French Open: 3R (2023)
- Wimbledon: 3R (2026)
- US Open: 3R (2024, 2026)

Other doubles tournaments
- Olympic Games: 2R (2024)

Grand Slam mixed doubles results
- Australian Open: 1R (2026)
- French Open: 1R (2026)
- Wimbledon: 2R (2026)
- Last updated on: 2 July 2026.

Francisco Cabral (Portuguese pronunciation: [fɾɐ̃ˈsiʃku kɐˈβɾal]; born 8 January 1997) is a Portuguese tennis player who specializes in doubles. He has a career high ATP doubles ranking of world No. 19 achieved on 12 January 2026.

Cabral has won six ATP doubles titles, one partnering with Nuno Borges, one pairing with Tomislav Brkić and four with Lucas Miedler. He has also won nine ATP Challenger doubles titles with Borges, including a record of six during the 2021 season, as well as one each with Szymon Walków and Nicolás Barrientos.

== Career ==
=== 2021–25: Record Six Challengers in a year, historic ATP title, Olympics & Top 20 ===
Since 2021 Cabral focused his professional career on doubles and in that year he won a record of six Challenger doubles titles partnering with Nuno Borges.

In May 2022, he reached the top 100 in doubles after a semifinal and first ATP 250 final showing at the 2022 Estoril Open with Borges as a wildcard pair, where they defeated the top seeded pair Jamie Murray and Michael Venus en route. They became the first Portuguese pair to reach and win the final at their home tournament, doing so on their ATP doubles debut. In July, Francisco Cabral won his second title at the 2022 Swiss Open in Gstaad, this time pairing with Tomislav Brkić.

In July 2025, Cabral won his third ATP Tour title at the 2025 Swiss Open in Gstaad, pairing with Lucas Miedler. In August, Cabral partnering with Lucas Miedler, made it to his seventh ATP 250 final at the Winston-Salem Open. In September, Cabral and Miedler won the Hangzhou Open in China beating Nicolás Barrientos and David Pel in the final.

In October, Cabral with Miedler reached his ninth doubles final at the ATP 500 2025 Erste Bank Open, but lost to Julian Cash and Lloyd Glasspool. Cabral and Miedler closed the 2025 season with a third title in Athens defeating Santiago González and David Pel in the final, ending in the ATP Live Doubles Teams Race in 11th position. As a result, Cabral finished the season ranked in the top 20 in the ATP doubles rankings, a career-high reached on 3 November 2025.

== ATP career finals ==
=== Doubles: 14 (7 titles, 7 runners-up) ===
Legend Grand Slam tournaments (0–0) ATP Tour Finals (0–0) ATP Tour Masters 1000 (0–1) ATP Tour 500 Series (0–1) ATP Tour 250 Series (7–5)	Finals by surface Hard (4–4) Clay (3–3) Grass (0–0)	Finals by setting Outdoor (6–6) Indoor (1–1)

Result	W–L	Date	Tournament	Tier	Surface	Partner	Opponents	Score
Win	1–0	Apr 2022	Estoril Open, Portugal	250 Series	Clay	(Portugal) Nuno Borges	(Argentina) Máximo González (Sweden) André Göransson	6–2, 6–3
Win	2–0	Jul 2022	Swiss Open Gstaad, Switzerland	250 Series	Clay	(Bosnia and Herzegovina) Tomislav Brkić	(Netherlands) Robin Haase (Austria) Philipp Oswald	6–4, 6–4
Loss	2–1	Apr 2023	Banja Luka Open, Bosnia and Herzegovina	250 Series	Clay	(Kazakhstan) Aleksandr Nedovyesov	(United Kingdom) Jamie Murray (New Zealand) Michael Venus	5–7, 2–6
Loss	2–2	Jul 2023	Swedish Open, Sweden	250 Series	Clay	(Brazil) Rafael Matos	(Ecuador) Gonzalo Escobar (Kazakhstan) Aleksandr Nedovyesov	2–6, 2–6
Loss	2–3	Sep 2023	Chengdu Open, China	250 Series	Hard	(Brazil) Rafael Matos	(France) Sadio Doumbia (France) Fabien Reboul	6–4, 5–7, [7–10]
Win	3–3	Jul 2025	Swiss Open Gstaad, Switzerland	250 Series	Clay	(Austria) Lucas Miedler	(Germany) Hendrik Jebens (France) Albano Olivetti	6–7^{(4–7)}, 7–6^{(7–4)}, [10–3]
Loss	3–4	Aug 2025	Winston-Salem Open, United States	250 Series	Hard	(Austria) Lucas Miedler	(Brazil) Rafael Matos (Brazil) Marcelo Melo	6–4, 4–6, [8–10]
Win	4–4	Sep 2025	Hangzhou Open, China	250 Series	Hard	(Austria) Lucas Miedler	(Colombia) Nicolás Barrientos (Netherlands) David Pel	6–4, 6–4
Loss	4–5	Oct 2025	Vienna Open, Austria	500 Series	Hard (i)	(Austria) Lucas Miedler	(United Kingdom) Julian Cash (United Kingdom) Lloyd Glasspool	1–6, 6–7^{(6–8)}
Win	5–5	Nov 2025	Hellenic Championship, Greece	250 Series	Hard (i)	(Austria) Lucas Miedler	(Mexico) Santiago González (Netherlands) David Pel	4–6, 6–3, [10–3]
Win	6–5	Jan 2026	Brisbane International, Australia	250 Series	Hard	(Austria) Lucas Miedler	(United Kingdom) Julian Cash (United Kingdom) Lloyd Glasspool	6–3, 3–6, [10–8]
Loss	6–6	Jul 2026	Swedish Open, Sweden	250 Series	Clay	(France) Théo Arribagé	(France) Sadio Doumbia (France) Fabien Reboul	3–6, 4–6
Win	7–6	Sep 2026	Hangzhou Open, China	250 Series	Hard	(United States) JJ Tracy	(Netherlands) Sander Arends (Netherlands) David Pel	7–5, 6–4
Loss	7–7	Oct 2026	Shanghai Masters, China	ATP 1000	Hard	(United States) JJ Tracy	(Austria) Lucas Miedler (Austria) Neil Oberleitner	3–6, 4–6

== ATP Challenger Tour titles ==
=== Doubles: 24 (15 titles, 9 runner-ups) ===
Finals by surface
Hard (2–3)
Clay (13–6)

Result	W–L	Date	Tournament	Surface	Partner	Opponents	Score
Win	1–0	Apr 2021	Oeiras, Portugal	Clay	(Portugal) Nuno Borges	(Russia) Pavel Kotov (Chinese Taipei) Tseng Chun-hsin	6–1, 6–2
Win	2–0	Sep 2021	Braga, Portugal	Clay	(Portugal) Nuno Borges	(Netherlands) Jesper de Jong (Netherlands) Bart Stevens	6–3, 6–7^{(4–7)}, [10–5]
Loss	2–1	Oct 2021	Lisbon, Portugal	Clay	(Portugal) Nuno Borges	(India) Jeevan Nedunchezhiyan (India) Purav Raja	6–7^{(5–7)}, 3–6
Loss	2–2	Oct 2021	Barcelona, Spain	Clay	(Portugal) Nuno Borges	(Finland) Harri Heliövaara (Czech Republic) Roman Jebavý	4–6, 3–6
Win	3–2	Nov 2021	Tenerife, Spain	Hard	(Portugal) Nuno Borges	(India) Jeevan Nedunchezhiyan (India) Purav Raja	6–3, 6–4
Win	4–2	Nov 2021	Manama, Bahrain	Hard	(Portugal) Nuno Borges	(Austria) Maximilian Neuchrist (Greece) Michail Pervolarakis	7–5, 6–7^{(5–7)}, [10–8]
Win	5–2	Dec 2021	Maia, Portugal	Clay (i)	(Portugal) Nuno Borges	(Slovakia) Andrej Martin (Portugal) Gonçalo Oliveira	6–3, 6–4
Win	6–2	Dec 2021	Maia, Portugal (2)	Clay (i)	(Portugal) Nuno Borges	(Poland) Piotr Matuszewski (Austria) David Pichler	6–4, 7–5
Win	7–2	Apr 2022	Oeiras, Portugal (2)	Clay	(Portugal) Nuno Borges	(Uzbekistan) Sanjar Fayziev (Greece) Markos Kalovelonis	6–3, 6–0
Win	8–2	Apr 2022	Oeiras, Portugal (3)	Clay	(Portugal) Nuno Borges	(Czech Republic) Zdeněk Kolář (Czech Republic) Adam Pavlásek	6–4, 6–0
Win	9–2	Apr 2022	Prague, Czech Republic	Clay	(Poland) Szymon Walków	(France) Tristan Lamasine (France) Lucas Pouille	6–2, 7–6^{(14–12)}
Win	10–2	May 2022	Prague, Czech Republic	Clay	(Portugal) Nuno Borges	(Czech Republic) Andrew Paulson (Czech Republic) Adam Pavlásek	6–4, 6–7^{(3–7)}, [10–5]
Loss	10–3	Jul 2022	Porto, Portugal	Hard	(Portugal) Nuno Borges	(India) Yuki Bhambri (India) Saketh Myneni	4–6, 6–3, [6–10]
Loss	10–4	Dec 2022	Maia, Portugal	Clay (i)	(Portugal) Nuno Borges	(United Kingdom) Julian Cash (United Kingdom) Henry Patten	3–6, 6–3, [8–10]
Win	11–4	Apr 2023	Rome, Italy	Clay	(Colombia) Nicolás Barrientos	(Kazakhstan) Andrey Golubev (Ukraine) Denys Molchanov	6–3, 6–1
Loss	11–5	May 2023	Aix-en-Provence, France	Clay	(Portugal) Nuno Borges	(Australia) Jason Kubler (Australia) John Peers	7–6^{(7–5)}, 4–6, [7–10]
Loss	11–6	Nov 2023	Bergamo, Italy	Hard (i)	(United Kingdom) Henry Patten	(United States) Evan King (United States) Brandon Nakashima	4–6, 6–7^{(1–7)}
Win	12–6	Oct 2024	Braga, Portugal (2)	Clay	(France) Théo Arribagé	(Italy) Marco Bortolotti (Israel) Daniel Cukierman	6–3, 6–4
Loss	12–7	Nov 2024	Rovereto, Italy	Hard (i)	(France) Théo Arribagé	(India) Sriram Balaji (India) Rithvik Choudary Bollipalli	3–6, 6–2, [10–12]
Win	13–7	Nov 2024	Maia, Portugal (3)	Clay (i)	(France) Théo Arribagé	(Belgium) Kimmer Coppejans (Spain) Sergio Martos Gornés	6–1, 3–6, [10–5]
Win	14–7	Apr 2025	Madrid, Spain	Clay	(Austria) Lucas Miedler	(Switzerland) Jakub Paul (Netherlands) David Pel	7–6^{(7–2)}, 6–4
Loss	14–8	Apr 2025	Oeiras, Portugal	Clay	(Austria) Lucas Miedler	(Poland) Karol Drzewiecki (Poland) Piotr Matuszewski	4–6, 6–3, [8–10]
Loss	14–9	May 2025	Estoril, Portugal	Clay	(Austria) Lucas Miedler	(Uruguay) Ariel Behar (Belgium) Joran Vliegen	5–7, 3–6
Win	15–9	May 2025	Bordeaux, France	Clay	(Austria) Lucas Miedler	(India) Yuki Bhambri (United States) Robert Galloway	7–6^{(7–1)}, 7–6^{(7–2)}
