= Tiago Cação =

Portuguese tennis player (born 1998)

- Country (sports): Portugal
- Born: 28 February 1998 (age 28) Peniche, Portugal
- Height: 1.85 m (6 ft 1 in)
- Plays: Right-handed (two-handed backhand)
- Coach: Manuel Costa Matos
- Prize money: US $103,597

Singles
- Career record: 0–0 (at ATP Tour level, Grand Slam level, and in Davis Cup)
- Career titles: 1 ITF
- Highest ranking: No. 394 (17 December 2018)
- Current ranking: No. 626 (19 October 2026)

Doubles
- Career record: 0–1 (at ATP Tour level, Grand Slam level, and in Davis Cup)
- Career titles: 6 ITF
- Highest ranking: No. 469 (1 October 2018)
- Current ranking: No. 826 (19 October 2026)
- Last updated on: 19 October 2026.

Tiago Cação (born 28 February 1998 in Peniche) is a Portuguese tennis player. Cação has a career high ATP singles ranking of No. 394 achieved on 17 December 2018 and a career high ATP doubles ranking of No. 469 achieved on 1 October 2018.

Cação made his ATP main draw debut at the 2019 Estoril Open in the doubles draw partnering Fred Gil.

In summer 2022, Cação put his professional career on ice embracing a stint as coach in Luxembourg. During this time he played in the elite level inter-clubs competitions in Luxembourg, Belgium, France and Germany. In summer 2025 he resumed his professional career in the ITF tournaments in Idanha-a-Nova followed by entering the qualifying stages of the Porto 2 Challenger. Cação has also been participating in UTR Pro Tennis Tour events.

In July 2016 Cação won his first single ITF tournament beating Pablo Pérez Ramos at the ITF M15 event in Castelo Branco, Portugal.

== Future and Challenger finals ==
=== Singles: 9 (1–8) ===
| Legend (singles) ATP Challenger Tour (0–0) ITF Futures / World Tennis Tour (1–8) | Titles by surface Hard (1–7) Clay (0–1) Grass (0–0) Carpet (0–0) |

| Result | W–L | Date | Tournament | Tier | Surface | Opponent | Score |
|---|---|---|---|---|---|---|---|
| Loss | 0–1 | Feb 2018 | Portugal F1, Vale do Lobo | Futures | Hard | (Portugal) Frederico Ferreira Silva | 2–6, 7–6^{(7–3)}, 5–7 |
| Loss | 0–2 | Apr 2018 | Portugal F8, Cascais | Futures | Clay | (Portugal) Frederico Ferreira Silva | 2–6, 6–3, 3–6 |
| Loss | 0–3 | Jul 2018 | Portugal F10, Setúbal | Futures | Hard | (France) Baptiste Crepatte | 2–6, 5–7 |
| Loss | 0–4 | Aug 2018 | Portugal F14, Sintra | Futures | Hard | (Portugal) Frederico Ferreira Silva | 3–6, 1–6 |
| Loss | 0–5 | Aug 2018 | Portugal F16, Sintra | Futures | Hard | (Portugal) Fred Gil | 3–6, 6–3, 0–6 |
| Loss | 0–6 | Mar 2019 | M15 Portimao, Portugal | ITF | Hard | (United Kingdom) Evan Hoyt | 3–6, 6–7^{(4–7)} |
| Loss | 0–7 | Feb 2020 | M15 Monastir, Tunisia | ITF | Hard | (Monaco) Lucas Catarina | 0–6, 6–4, 5–7 |
| Loss | 0–8 | Mar 2020 | M15 Faro, Portugal | ITF | Hard | (Germany) Sebastian Fanselow | 3–6, 3–6 |
| Win | 1–8 | Jul 2026 | M15 Castelo Branco, Portugal | ITF | Hard | (Spain) Pablo Perez Ramos | 3–6, 6–2, 7–6^{(7–5)} |
