= Open de Oeiras =

Oeiras Open

ATP Challenger Tour
- Event name: Oeiras Open
- Location: Oeiras, Portugal
- Venue: Complexo Desportivo do Jamor
- Category: Challenger 125 (1st edition), Challenger Tour (2nd)
- Surface: Clay
- Prize money: €181,250
- Website: website

Current champions (2025)
- Singles: (Denmark) Elmer Møller
- Doubles: (Poland) Karol Drzewiecki (Poland) Piotr Matuszewski

The Oeiras Open is a professional tennis tournament played on clay courts. It is currently part of the ATP Challenger Tour. It was first held in Oeiras, Portugal during 2021 in two editions.

The winning records are held by Portuguese tennis players both in singles and doubles, by Gastão Elias, and by Nuno Borges and Francisco Cabral respectively, with 3 victories each. They recorded them simultaneously two times in the 2022 I and II editions, making them one-flag winners editions.

== Past finals ==
=== Singles ===
Year	Champion	Runner-up	Score
2021 (1)	(Czech Republic) Zdeněk Kolář	(Portugal) Gastão Elias	6–4, 7–5
2021 (2)	(Argentina) Pedro Cachin	(Portugal) Nuno Borges	7–6^{(7–4)}, 7–6^{(7–3)}
2021 (3)	(Spain) Carlos Alcaraz	(Argentina) Facundo Bagnis	6–4, 6–4
2021 (4)	(Portugal) Gastão Elias (1)	(Denmark) Holger Rune	5–7, 6–4, 6–4
2022 (1)	(Portugal) Gastão Elias (2)	(Croatia) Nino Serdarušić	6–3, 6–4
2022 (2)	(Portugal) Gastão Elias (3)	(Italy) Alessandro Giannessi	7–6^{(7–4)}, 6–1
2022 (3)	(Japan) Kaichi Uchida	(Belgium) Kimmer Coppejans	6–2, 6–4
2023 (1)	(Hungary) Zsombor Piros	(Argentina) Juan Manuel Cerúndolo	6–3, 6–4
2023 (2)	(Argentina) Facundo Díaz Acosta	(Australia) Aleksandar Vukic	6–4, 6–3
2024 (1)	(Argentina) Francisco Comesaña	(France) Ugo Blanchet	6–4, 3–6, 7–5
2024 (2)	(Portugal) Jaime Faria	(Sweden) Elias Ymer	3–6, 7–6^{(7–3)}, 6–4
2025 (1)	(Denmark) Elmer Møller	(Argentina) Francisco Comesaña	6–0, 6–4
2025 (2)	(Chile) Cristian Garín	(United States) Mitchell Krueger	7–6^{(7–3)}, 4–6, 6–2
2026 (1)	Roman Safiullin	(France) Valentin Royer	6–1, 6–2
2026 (2)	(Serbia) Laslo Djere	(United States) Emilio Nava	6–3, 6–4

=== Doubles ===
Year	Champions	Runners-up	Score
2021 (1)	(Germany) Mats Moraing (Germany) Oscar Otte	(Italy) Riccardo Bonadio (Kazakhstan) Denis Yevseyev	6–1, 6–4
2021 (2)	(Portugal) Nuno Borges (1) (Portugal) Francisco Cabral (1)	(Russia) Pavel Kotov (Chinese Taipei) Tseng Chun-hsin	6–1, 6–2
2021 (3)	(United States) Hunter Reese (Netherlands) Sem Verbeek	(France) Sadio Doumbia (France) Fabien Reboul	4–6, 6–4, [10–7]
2021 (4)	(Netherlands) Jesper de Jong (Netherlands) Tim van Rijthoven	(Germany) Julian Lenz (Ecuador) Roberto Quiroz	6–1, 7–6^{(7–3)}
2022 (1)	(Portugal) Nuno Borges (2) (Portugal) Francisco Cabral (2)	(Uzbekistan) Sanjar Fayziev (Greece) Markos Kalovelonis	6–3, 6–0
2022 (2)	(Portugal) Nuno Borges (3) (Portugal) Francisco Cabral (3)	(Czech Republic) Zdeněk Kolář (Czech Republic) Adam Pavlásek	6–4, 6–0
2022 (3)	(France) Sadio Doumbia (France) Fabien Reboul	(United States) Robert Galloway (United States) Alex Lawson	6–3, 3–6, [15–13]
2023 (1)	(Romania) Victor Vlad Cornea (Croatia) Franko Škugor	(Brazil) Marcelo Demoliner (Italy) Andrea Vavassori	7–6^{(7–2)}, 7–6^{(7–4)}
2023 (2)	(United Kingdom) Luke Johnson (Netherlands) Sem Verbeek	(Portugal) Jaime Faria (Portugal) Henrique Rocha	6–7^{(6–8)}, 7–5, [10–6]
2024 (1)	(Sweden) Filip Bergevi (Netherlands) Mick Veldheer	(Spain) Sergio Martos Gornés (Greece) Petros Tsitsipas	6–1, 6–4
2024 (2)	(India) Anirudh Chandrasekar (India) Arjun Kadhe	(Sweden) Simon Freund (Denmark) Johannes Ingildsen	7–5, 6–4
2025 (1)	(Poland) Karol Drzewiecki (Poland) Piotr Matuszewski	(Portugal) Francisco Cabral (Austria) Lucas Miedler	6–4, 3–6, [10–8]
2025 (2)	(Germany) Andreas Mies (Spain) David Vega Hernández	(Brazil) Marcelo Demoliner (Austria) David Pichler	6–4, 6–4
2026 (1)	(India) Sriram Balaji (Austria) Neil Oberleitner	(Colombia) Nicolás Barrientos (Uruguay) Ariel Behar	6–7^{(7–9)}, 6–4, [11–9]
2026 (2)	(India) Siddhant Banthia (Bulgaria) Alexander Donski	(Portugal) Tiago Pereira (Spain) David Vega Hernández	6–3, 6–2
