= 2026 Brasília Tennis Open – Singles =

Singles
- 2026 Brasília Tennis Open

Final
- Champion: (Portugal) Henrique Rocha
- Runner-up: (Paraguay) Daniel Vallejo
- Score: 6–4, 6–4

Events
Singles	Doubles
- Brasília Tennis Open

This was the first edition of the tournament.

Henrique Rocha won the title after defeating Daniel Vallejo 6–4, 6–4 in the final.

== Seeds ==
1. (Paraguay) Daniel Vallejo (final)
2. (Denmark) Elmer Møller (first round)
3. (Portugal) Jaime Faria (second round)
4. (Netherlands) Guy den Ouden (first round)
5. (Portugal) Henrique Rocha (champion)
6. (Argentina) Juan Pablo Ficovich (first round)
7. (Colombia) Daniel Elahi Galán (first round)
8. (Ecuador) Álvaro Guillén Meza (first round)

== Draw ==
Key

- Q = Qualifier
- WC = Wild card
- LL = Lucky loser
- Alt = Alternate
- ITF = ITF entry
- PR = Protected ranking
- SR = Special ranking
- SE = Special exempt
- JE = Junior exempt
- JR = Junior Accelerator Programme entrant
- CO = College Accelerator Programme entrant
- NG = Next Gen Accelerator Program entrant
- w/o = Walkover
- r = Retired
- d = Defaulted

=== Finals ===
Semifinals
1	(Paraguay) Daniel Vallejo	7	6
Q	(Brazil) Eduardo Ribeiro	5	2
5	(Portugal) Henrique Rocha	6	6^{3}	6
(Brazil) Thiago Monteiro	0	7^{7}	3

Final
1	(Paraguay) Daniel Vallejo	4	4
5	(Portugal) Henrique Rocha	6	6

=== Top half ===
First round
1	(Paraguay) AD Vallejo	6	6
(United States) T Boyer	2	2
(Brazil) F Meligeni Alves	6^{5}	6^{6}
Q	(Brazil) João Eduardo Schiessl	7^{7}	7^{8}
SE	(Argentina) F Díaz Acosta	6	7^{7}
(Spain) N Sánchez Izquierdo	3	6^{5}
WC	(Brazil) G Miguel	7^{7}	7
6	(Argentina) JP Ficovich	6^{1}	5
3	(Portugal) J Faria	7^{13}	3	7^{11}
(Italy) G Cadenasso	6^{11}	6	6^{9}
Q	(Brazil) E Ribeiro	6	6
Q	(Uruguay) F Roncadelli	4	3
WC	(Brazil) I Marcondes	6^{4}	6	6
Q	(Brazil) P Sakamoto	7^{7}	4	1
(Brazil) G Heide	6	4	7^{7}
7	(Colombia) DE Galán	1	6	6^{3}

Second round
1	(Paraguay) AD Vallejo	6	6
Q	(Brazil) JE Schiessl	4	2
SE	(Argentina) F Díaz Acosta	6	6
WC	(Brazil) G Miguel	4	3
3	(Portugal) J Faria	6^{7}	4
Q	(Brazil) E Ribeiro	7^{9}	6
WC	(Brazil) I Marcondes	4	6	4
(Brazil) G Heide	6	4	6

Quarterfinals
1	(Paraguay) AD Vallejo	7^{8}	6
SE	(Argentina) F Díaz Acosta	6^{6}	3
Q	(Brazil) E Ribeiro	6	4	6
(Brazil) G Heide	4	6	4

Semifinals
1	(Paraguay) AD Vallejo	7	6
Q	(Brazil) E Ribeiro	5	2

=== Bottom half ===
First round
5	(Portugal) H Rocha	7	6
(Italy) F Agamenone	5	2
Q	(Spain) C Sánchez Jover	7^{7}	4	6
WC	(Colombia) Miguel Tobón	6^{2}	6	1
(Brazil) JL Reis da Silva	6	4	6
(Chile) M Soto	1	6	4
(Bolivia) JC Prado Ángelo	6	6
4	(Netherlands) G den Ouden	4	3
8	(Ecuador) Á Guillén Meza	6^{8}	4
(Spain) M Damas	7^{10}	6
(Brazil) T Monteiro	6	6
Alt	(Brazil) D Dutra da Silva	4	4
Q	(Chile) Benjamín Torrealba	2	1
(Peru) JP Varillas	6	6
(Brazil) P Boscardin Dias	6	6
2	(Denmark) E Møller	2	3

Second round
5	(Portugal) H Rocha	7^{7}	6
Q	(Spain) C Sánchez Jover	6^{3}	2
(Brazil) JL Reis da Silva	6	3	4
(Bolivia) JC Prado Ángelo	3	6	6
(Spain) M Damas	4	5
(Brazil) T Monteiro	6	7
(Peru) JP Varillas	2	6^{1}
(Brazil) P Boscardin Dias	6	7^{7}

Quarterfinals
5	(Portugal) H Rocha	6	6
(Bolivia) JC Prado Ángelo	3	3
(Brazil) T Monteiro	6	6
(Brazil) P Boscardin Dias	1	2

Semifinals
5	(Portugal) H Rocha	6	6^{3}	6
(Brazil) T Monteiro	0	7^{7}	3
