= 2025 US Open – Men's singles qualifying =

Men's singles qualifying
- 2025 US Open

Details
- Draw: 128
- Seeds: 32

Events
Singles	men	women		boys	girls
Doubles	men	women	mixed	boys	girls
WC Singles	men	women	quad
WC Doubles	men	women	quad

Qualification
Singles	men	women
- US Open

The 2025 US Open – Men's singles qualifying was a series of tennis matches that took place from 18 to 22 August 2025 (was originally to end on 21 August, but got rescheduled due to heavy rain) to determine the sixteen qualifiers into the main draw of the men's singles tournament.

Only 16 out of the 128 qualifiers who competed in this tournament secured a main draw place, and, if necessary, the lucky losers.

== Seeds ==
All seeds are per ATP rankings as of 11 August 2025.

1. (France) Arthur Cazaux (qualifying competition)
2. (Netherlands) Jesper de Jong (qualified)
3. (Spain) Carlos Taberner (first round)
4. (Argentina) Juan Manuel Cerúndolo (second round)
5. (Australia) James Duckworth (qualifying competition, lucky loser)
6. (Georgia (country)) Nikoloz Basilashvili (second round)
7. (Canada) Liam Draxl (first round)
8. (Czech Republic) Dalibor Svrčina (first round)
9. (Finland) Otto Virtanen (second round)
10. (Italy) Francesco Passaro (qualified)
11. (Belgium) Alexander Blockx (second round, retired)
12. (Japan) Shintaro Mochizuki (qualified)
13. (Chile) Cristian Garín (second round)
14. (Slovakia) Lukáš Klein (first round)
15. (Portugal) Jaime Faria (qualifying competition, lucky loser)
16. (Italy) Matteo Gigante (second round)
17. (Argentina) Juan Pablo Ficovich (first round)
18. (United Kingdom) Dan Evans (first round)
19. (Croatia) Dino Prižmić (qualified)
20. (Chile) Tomás Barrios Vera (first round)
21. (Germany) Yannick Hanfmann (first round)
22. (United States) Zachary Svajda (qualified)
23. (France) Pierre-Hugues Herbert (first round)
24. (Argentina) Thiago Agustín Tirante (second round)
25. (France) Térence Atmane (withdrew)
26. (Brazil) Thiago Seyboth Wild (first round)
27. (United States) Colton Smith (first round)
28. (Italy) Andrea Pellegrino (first round)
29. (Peru) Ignacio Buse (qualified)
30. (Spain) Martín Landaluce (second round)
31. (Germany) Jan-Lennard Struff (qualified)
32. (Colombia) Daniel Elahi Galán (qualifying competition, lucky loser)

== Qualifiers ==
1. (Germany) Jan-Lennard Struff
2. (Netherlands) Jesper de Jong
3. (Switzerland) Jérôme Kym
4. (United States) Martin Damm
5. (Hungary) Zsombor Piros
6. (United States) Zachary Svajda
7. (Croatia) Dino Prižmić
8. (South Africa) Lloyd Harris
9. (Switzerland) Leandro Riedi
10. (Italy) Francesco Passaro
11. (Peru) Ignacio Buse
12. (Japan) Shintaro Mochizuki
13. (Spain) Pablo Llamas Ruiz
14. (Argentina) Federico Agustín Gómez
15. (France) Ugo Blanchet
16. (Hong Kong) Coleman Wong

== Lucky losers ==
1. (Australia) James Duckworth
2. (Portugal) Jaime Faria
3. (United Kingdom) Billy Harris
4. (Colombia) Daniel Elahi Galán

== Draw ==
Key

- Q = Qualifier
- WC = Wild card
- LL = Lucky loser
- Alt = Alternate
- ITF = ITF entry
- PR = Protected ranking
- SR = Special ranking
- SE = Special exempt
- JE = Junior exempt
- JR = Junior Accelerator Programme entrant
- CO = College Accelerator Programme entrant
- NG = Next Gen Accelerator Program entrant
- w/o = Walkover
- r = Retired
- d = Defaulted

=== First qualifier ===
First round
1	(France) Arthur Cazaux	6	6
(Estonia) Mark Lajal	4	1
(United Kingdom) Jay Clarke	7^{7}	6
WC	(United States) Jack Satterfield	6^{5}	1
(Japan) Taro Daniel	6	7
(Ukraine) Vitaliy Sachko	1	5
(France) Clément Chidekh	4	1
31	(Germany) Jan-Lennard Struff	6	6

Second round
1	(France) Arthur Cazaux	6	6
(United Kingdom) Jay Clarke	3	4
(Japan) Taro Daniel	6	4	1
31	(Germany) Jan-Lennard Struff	2	6	6

Qualifying competition
1	(France) Arthur Cazaux	6^{4}	3
31	(Germany) Jan-Lennard Struff	7^{7}	6

=== Second qualifier ===
First round
2	(Netherlands) Jesper de Jong	6	6
(Lithuania) Vilius Gaubas	3	4
(United Kingdom) Johannus Monday	5	3
(France) Harold Mayot	7	6
(Argentina) Santiago Rodríguez Taverna	3	7	1
(United States) Mitchell Krueger	6	5	6
(United Kingdom) Jan Choinski	6^{4}	4
Alt	(Argentina) Andrea Collarini	7^{7}	6

Second round
2	(Netherlands) Jesper de Jong	7^{13}	6^{4}	6
(France) Harold Mayot	6^{11}	7^{7}	3
(United States) Mitchell Krueger	7^{7}	7
Alt	(Argentina) Andrea Collarini	6^{4}	5

Qualifying competition
2	(Netherlands) Jesper de Jong	6	6
(United States) Mitchell Krueger	4	1

=== Third qualifier ===
First round
3	(Spain) Carlos Taberner	6^{2}	1
(Switzerland) Jérôme Kym	7^{7}	6
WC	(United States) Michael Zheng	6	6
(Japan) Yasutaka Uchiyama	2	3
(Serbia) Dušan Lajović	3	1
(France) Luca Van Assche	6	6
(China) Wu Yibing	6	6
17	(Argentina) Juan Pablo Ficovich	3	3

Second round
(Switzerland) Jérôme Kym	6	6
WC	(United States) Michael Zheng	3	4
(France) Luca Van Assche	3	3
(China) Wu Yibing	6	6

Qualifying competition
(Switzerland) Jérôme Kym	6	6
(China) Wu Yibing	3	2

=== Fourth qualifier ===
First round
4	(Argentina) Juan Manuel Cerúndolo	6	6
(France) Calvin Hemery	4	3
(Japan) Yuta Shimizu	6^{3}	6	6
(Japan) Sho Shimabukuro	7^{7}	3	3
WC	(United States) Martin Damm	6	6
(Italy) Stefano Travaglia	3	2
(Lebanon) Benjamin Hassan	6	7^{7}
20	(Chile) Tomás Barrios Vera	2	6^{3}

Second round
4	(Argentina) Juan Manuel Cerúndolo	6^{5}	5
(Japan) Yuta Shimizu	7^{7}	7
WC	(United States) Martin Damm	7	7^{7}
(Lebanon) Benjamin Hassan	5	6^{5}

Qualifying competition
(Japan) Yuta Shimizu	6^{10}	4
WC	(United States) Martin Damm	7^{12}	6

=== Fifth qualifier ===
First round
5	(Australia) James Duckworth	6	6
PR	(Argentina) Facundo Bagnis	4	2
(Italy) Francesco Maestrelli	3	7^{7}	4
(Australia) James McCabe	6	6^{2}	6
(France) Arthur Bouquier	5	6^{2}
(Hungary) Zsombor Piros	7	7^{7}
WC	(United States) Jack Kennedy	4	4
24	(Argentina) Thiago Agustín Tirante	6	6

Second round
5	(Australia) James Duckworth	7	5	7^{10}
(Australia) James McCabe	5	7	6^{5}
(Hungary) Zsombor Piros	6	7^{7}
24	(Argentina) Thiago Agustín Tirante	3	6^{3}

Qualifying competition
5	(Australia) James Duckworth	1	6	2
(Hungary) Zsombor Piros	6	4	6

=== Sixth qualifier ===
First round
6	(Georgia (country)) Nikoloz Basilashvili	7^{8}	5	6
(Belgium) Gauthier Onclin	6^{6}	7	1
(Switzerland) Marc-Andrea Hüsler	6	6^{2}	6
PR	(Italy) Stefano Napolitano	3	7^{7}	4
(Kazakhstan) Beibit Zhukayev	3	7^{8}	7^{14}
(United Kingdom) Jack Pinnington Jones	6	6^{6}	6^{12}
(Denmark) August Holmgren	2	6^{1}
22	(United States) Zachary Svajda	6	7^{7}

Second round
6	(Georgia (country)) Nikoloz Basilashvili	6^{4}	5
(Switzerland) Marc-Andrea Hüsler	7^{7}	7
(Kazakhstan) Beibit Zhukayev	3	5
22	(United States) Zachary Svajda	6	7

Qualifying competition
(Switzerland) Marc-Andrea Hüsler	3	2
22	(United States) Zachary Svajda	6	6

=== Seventh qualifier ===
First round
7	(Canada) Liam Draxl	5	2
(France) Kyrian Jacquet	7	6
(Australia) Jason Kubler	6	7
(United Kingdom) George Loffhagen	4	5
(United States) Murphy Cassone	6	5	7
(Brazil) Thiago Monteiro	3	7	5
(Canada) Alexis Galarneau	6^{7}	1
19	(Croatia) Dino Prižmić	7^{9}	6

Second round
(France) Kyrian Jacquet	4	2
(Australia) Jason Kubler	6	6
(United States) Murphy Cassone	3	2
19	(Croatia) Dino Prižmić	6	6

Qualifying competition
(Australia) Jason Kubler	3	6	1
19	(Croatia) Dino Prižmić	6	4	6

=== Eighth qualifier ===
First round
8	(Czech Republic) Dalibor Svrčina	6	3	5
(Spain) Daniel Mérida	1	6	7
(France) Titouan Droguet	6	4
Alibek Kachmazov	1	2^{r}
(Spain) Pol Martín Tiffon	6	6^{5}	1^{r}
(China) Sun Fajing	3	7^{7}	4
PR	(South Africa) Lloyd Harris	6	3	7
18	(United Kingdom) Dan Evans	4	6	5

Second round
(Spain) Daniel Mérida	6	3	6
(France) Titouan Droguet	4	6	4
(China) Sun Fajing	2	2
PR	(South Africa) Lloyd Harris	6	6

Qualifying competition
(Spain) Daniel Mérida	1	6^{2}
PR	(South Africa) Lloyd Harris	6	7^{7}

=== Ninth qualifier ===
First round
9	(Finland) Otto Virtanen	6^{5}	6	6
WC	(United States) Benjamin Willwerth	7^{7}	3	2
(France) Luka Pavlovic	2	6^{3}
PR	(Switzerland) Leandro Riedi	6	7^{7}
(Australia) Alex Bolt	7	4	4
(United Kingdom) Oliver Crawford	5	6	6
WC	(United States) Garrett Johns	6	6
27	(United States) Colton Smith	3	3

Second round
9	(Finland) Otto Virtanen	6^{8}	4
PR	(Switzerland) Leandro Riedi	7^{10}	6
(United Kingdom) Oliver Crawford	6^{4}	3
WC	(United States) Garrett Johns	7^{7}	6

Qualifying competition
PR	(Switzerland) Leandro Riedi	7^{7}	6
WC	(United States) Garrett Johns	6^{5}	4

=== Tenth qualifier ===
First round
10	(Italy) Francesco Passaro	6	1	6
(Chinese Taipei) Hsu Yu-hsiou	3	6	4
(France) Sascha Gueymard Wayenburg	7^{7}	3	1
(Mexico) Rodrigo Pacheco Méndez	6^{2}	6	6
(United States) Patrick Kypson	4	4
(Australia) Bernard Tomic	6	6
(Portugal) Henrique Rocha	6	6^{1}	6
23	(France) Pierre-Hugues Herbert	4	7^{7}	4

Second round
10	(Italy) Francesco Passaro	4	7^{7}	6
(Mexico) Rodrigo Pacheco Méndez	6	6^{2}	4
(Australia) Bernard Tomic	6^{4}	2
(Portugal) Henrique Rocha	7^{7}	6

Qualifying competition
10	(Italy) Francesco Passaro	7	6
(Portugal) Henrique Rocha	5	3

=== Eleventh qualifier ===
First round
11	(Belgium) Alexander Blockx	6	6
(Brazil) João Lucas Reis da Silva	2	1
(Argentina) Alex Barrena	4	7^{7}	3
(Belgium) Kimmer Coppejans	6	6^{4}	6
WC	(United States) Tyler Zink	6	5	6^{8}
(Japan) Rei Sakamoto	4	7	7^{10}
(Austria) Lukas Neumayer	6^{2}	7^{7}	1
29	(Peru) Ignacio Buse	7^{7}	6^{5}	6

Second round
11	(Belgium) Alexander Blockx	6^{5}	0^{r}
(Belgium) Kimmer Coppejans	7^{7}	0
(Japan) Rei Sakamoto	4	6	4
29	(Peru) Ignacio Buse	6	4	6

Qualifying competition
(Belgium) Kimmer Coppejans	3	4
29	(Peru) Ignacio Buse	6	6

=== Twelfth qualifier ===
First round
12	(Japan) Shintaro Mochizuki	6	4	6
(Austria) Jurij Rodionov	2	6	2
(Argentina) Román Andrés Burruchaga	3	6	7
(Germany) Justin Engel	6	3	5
WC	(United States) Patrick Maloney	6	7^{7}
(Sweden) Elias Ymer	3	6^{3}
(Netherlands) Guy den Ouden	1	5
32	(Colombia) Daniel Elahi Galán	6	7

Second round
12	(Japan) Shintaro Mochizuki	6	1	6
(Argentina) Román Andrés Burruchaga	4	6	4
WC	(United States) Patrick Maloney	4	2
32	(Colombia) Daniel Elahi Galán	6	6

Qualifying competition
12	(Japan) Shintaro Mochizuki	6	6
32	(Colombia) Daniel Elahi Galán	4	4

=== Thirteenth qualifier ===
First round
13	(Chile) Cristian Garín	6	6
(Japan) Yosuke Watanuki	4	4
(Argentina) Marco Trungelliti	7	3	6
(United States) Christopher Eubanks	5	6	3
WC	(United States) Andres Martin	6	6
(Norway) Viktor Durasovic	2	3
PR	(Spain) Pablo Llamas Ruiz	1	6	6
21	(Germany) Yannick Hanfmann	6	3	4

Second round
13	(Chile) Cristian Garín	6^{3}	5
(Argentina) Marco Trungelliti	7^{7}	7
WC	(United States) Andres Martin	4	4
PR	(Spain) Pablo Llamas Ruiz	6	6

Qualifying competition
(Argentina) Marco Trungelliti	6	1	2
PR	(Spain) Pablo Llamas Ruiz	3	6	6

=== Fourteenth qualifier ===
First round
14	(Slovakia) Lukáš Klein	2	4
(Argentina) Federico Agustín Gómez	6	6
(Switzerland) Dominic Stricker	2	2
(Italy) Federico Cinà	6	6
(France) Hugo Grenier	6^{3}	6	6
(Australia) Omar Jasika	7^{7}	3	3
(France) Clément Tabur	4	4
30	(Spain) Martín Landaluce	6	6

Second round
(Argentina) Federico Agustín Gómez	6	2	7
(Italy) Federico Cinà	3	6	5
(France) Hugo Grenier	6	7^{7}
30	(Spain) Martín Landaluce	3	6^{3}

Qualifying competition
(Argentina) Federico Agustín Gómez	6^{5}	7^{7}	6
(France) Hugo Grenier	7^{7}	6^{5}	2

=== Fifteenth qualifier ===
First round
15	(Portugal) Jaime Faria	3	6	6
(Japan) Rio Noguchi	6	4	3
PR	(Italy) Giulio Zeppieri	4	7^{9}	7
(Lebanon) Hady Habib	6	6^{7}	5
(Croatia) Borna Gojo	6^{2}	6	3
(France) Ugo Blanchet	7^{7}	3	6
(Kazakhstan) Dmitry Popko	7^{7}	6
26	(Brazil) Thiago Seyboth Wild	6^{4}	3

Second round
15	(Portugal) Jaime Faria	7^{7}	7
PR	(Italy) Giulio Zeppieri	6^{5}	5
(France) Ugo Blanchet	6	6
(Kazakhstan) Dmitry Popko	3	4

Qualifying competition
15	(Portugal) Jaime Faria	5	4
(France) Ugo Blanchet	7	6

=== Sixteenth qualifier ===
First round
16	(Italy) Matteo Gigante	3	6	6
(Lithuania) Edas Butvilas	6	4	2
(Luxembourg) Chris Rodesch	4	2
(Hong Kong) Coleman Wong	6	6
(Japan) James Trotter	6	1	2
(United Kingdom) Billy Harris	3	6	6
(Kazakhstan) Mikhail Kukushkin	7^{7}	6
28	(Italy) Andrea Pellegrino	6^{4}	3

Second round
16	(Italy) Matteo Gigante	6	3	5
(Hong Kong) Coleman Wong	4	6	7
(United Kingdom) Billy Harris	6^{5}	6	6
(Kazakhstan) Mikhail Kukushkin	7^{7}	3	2

Qualifying competition
(Hong Kong) Coleman Wong	6	6
(United Kingdom) Billy Harris	3	4
