= 2026 Cincinnati Open – Men's singles =

Tennis championship

Men's singles
- 2026 Cincinnati Open

Final
- Champion: (France) Arthur Fils
- Runner-up: (United States) Frances Tiafoe
- Score: 6–3, 1–6, 6–0
- Date: 23 August 2026

Details
- Draw: 96
- Seeds: 32

Events
Singles	men	women
Doubles	men	women
- Cincinnati Open

Arthur Fils defeated Frances Tiafoe in the final, 6–3, 1–6, 6–0 to win the men's singles tennis title at the 2026 Cincinnati Open. It was his first ATP Masters 1000 title, and fifth career ATP Tour title overall. Fils was the first Frenchman to win the Cincinnati Open title since Guy Forget in 1991, and the first to win a Masters title overall since Jo-Wilfried Tsonga at the 2014 Canadian Open.

Carlos Alcaraz was the reigning champion, but did not participate due to a wrist injury.

The loss of Taylor Fritz in the quarterfinals guaranteed a first-time Masters champion.

== Seeds ==
All seeds receive a bye into the second round.

1. (Germany) Alexander Zverev (fourth round)
2. (Canada) Félix Auger-Aliassime (fourth round)
3. (Serbia) Novak Djokovic (second round)
4. Daniil Medvedev (third round)
5. (Australia) Alex de Minaur (fourth round)
6. (United States) Taylor Fritz (quarterfinals)
7. (Italy) Flavio Cobolli (semifinals)
8. (United States) Ben Shelton (second round)
9. (Czech Republic) Jiří Lehečka (third round)
10. (Italy) Lorenzo Musetti (quarterfinals)
11. (Norway) Casper Ruud (second round, retired)
12. (Spain) Rafael Jódar (fourth round)
13. Andrey Rublev (third round)
14. (Czech Republic) Jakub Menšík (fourth round)
15. (Monaco) Valentin Vacherot (second round)
16. (United States) Learner Tien (third round)
17. (United States) Frances Tiafoe (final)
18. (United States) Tommy Paul (quarterfinals)
19. (Italy) Luciano Darderi (second round)
20. (Argentina) Francisco Cerúndolo (second round)
21. (France) Arthur Fils (champion)
22. (Chile) Alejandro Tabilo (third round)
23. (Brazil) João Fonseca (third round, withdrew)
24. (France) Ugo Humbert (second round)
25. (France) Arthur Rinderknech (second round)
26. (Argentina) Tomás Martín Etcheverry (second round)
27. (United States) Brandon Nakashima (semifinals)
28. (Belgium) Alexander Blockx (third round)
29. (Peru) Ignacio Buse (second round)
30. (Belgium) Zizou Bergs (second round)
31. (Italy) Matteo Arnaldi (second round)
32. (United Kingdom) Arthur Fery (third round)

Click on the seed number of a player to go to their draw section.

== Draw ==
Key

- Q = Qualifier
- WC = Wild card
- LL = Lucky loser
- Alt = Alternate
- ITF = ITF entry
- PR = Protected ranking
- SR = Special ranking
- SE = Special exempt
- JE = Junior exempt
- JR = Junior Accelerator Programme entrant
- CO = College Accelerator Programme entrant
- NG = Next Gen Accelerator Program entrant
- w/o = Walkover
- r = Retired
- d = Defaulted

=== Finals ===
Quarterfinals
18	(United States) Tommy Paul	6	3	4
7	(Italy) Flavio Cobolli	2	6	6
(Argentina) Thiago Agustín Tirante	3	2
21	(France) Arthur Fils	6	6
6	(United States) Taylor Fritz	6^{9}	6	3
27	(United States) Brandon Nakashima	7^{11}	4	6
10	(Italy) Lorenzo Musetti	6^{2}	5
17	(United States) Frances Tiafoe	7^{7}	7

Semifinals
7	(Italy) Flavio Cobolli	3	4
21	(France) Arthur Fils	6	6
27	(United States) Brandon Nakashima	5	3
17	(United States) Frances Tiafoe	7	6

Final
21	(France) Arthur Fils	6	1	6
17	(United States) Frances Tiafoe	3	6	0

=== Top half ===
==== Section 1 ====
First round
(United Kingdom) C Norrie	3	6	6
(Croatia) D Prižmić	6	1	4
(Hungary) M Fucsovics	1^{r}
(France) T Atmane	3
LL	(Japan) S Shimabukuro	2	4
(Poland) H Hurkacz	6	6
Q	(France) K Jacquet	2	4
(Paraguay) AD Vallejo	6	6

Second round
1	(Germany) A Zverev	3	6	6
(United Kingdom) C Norrie	6	3	3
(France) T Atmane	6	7^{7}
26	(Argentina) TM Etcheverry	3	6^{4}
18	(United States) T Paul	6	6^{3}	6
(Poland) H Hurkacz	4	7^{7}	3
(Paraguay) AD Vallejo	6	6
15	(Monaco) V Vacherot	3	3

Third round
1	(Germany) A Zverev	7^{7}	7^{8}
(France) T Atmane	6^{4}	6^{6}
18	(United States) T Paul	3	6	6
(Paraguay) AD Vallejo	6	3	4

Fourth round
1	(Germany) A Zverev	6	6^{6}	4
18	(United States) T Paul	4	7^{8}	6

==== Section 2 ====
First round
(Canada) D Shapovalov	6	6
(France) A Mannarino	1	4
(Argentina) RA Burruchaga	6^{4}	6	3
(Germany) J-L Struff	7^{7}	2	6
(Argentina) M Navone	6	7^{7}
(Belgium) R Collignon	3	6^{3}
(Argentina) C Ugo Carabelli	3	3
(Serbia) M Kecmanović	6	6

Second round
12	(Spain) R Jódar	7	4	7
(Canada) D Shapovalov	5	6	5
(Germany) J-L Struff	3	4
22	(Chile) A Tabilo	6	6
28	(Belgium) A Blockx	6	6
(Argentina) M Navone	3	4
(Serbia) M Kecmanović	1	6	3
7	(Italy) F Cobolli	6	4	6

Third round
12	(Spain) R Jódar	6	6
22	(Chile) A Tabilo	2	1
28	(Belgium) A Blockx	5	6	5
7	(Italy) F Cobolli	7	4	7

Fourth round
12	(Spain) R Jódar	6	6^{3}	3
7	(Italy) F Cobolli	4	7^{7}	6

==== Section 3 ====
First round
(Argentina) TA Tirante	7^{11}	6^{7}	7^{7}
(United Kingdom) J Choinski	6^{9}	7^{9}	6^{4}
(Spain) M Landaluce	6	7
WC	(United Kingdom) J Draper	3	5
WC	(Australia) R Hijikata	2	7^{7}	6
WC	(France) G Monfils	6	6^{5}	3
(United States) Z Svajda	6^{0}	6^{4}
(Italy) M Bellucci	7^{7}	7^{7}

Second round
3	(Serbia) N Djokovic	6	4	4
(Argentina) TA Tirante	2	6	6
(Spain) M Landaluce	6	4	6
31	(Italy) M Arnaldi	4	6	4
19	(Italy) L Darderi	4	2
WC	(Australia) R Hijikata	6	6
(Italy) M Bellucci	5	6	6^{5}
14	(Czech Republic) J Menšík	7	2	7^{7}

Third round
(Argentina) TA Tirante	7^{7}	7^{7}
(Spain) M Landaluce	6^{5}	6^{4}
WC	(Australia) R Hijikata	3	4
14	(Czech Republic) J Menšík	6	6

Fourth round
(Argentina) TA Tirante	5	6	6
14	(Czech Republic) J Menšík	7	4	4

==== Section 4 ====
First round
Q	(France) T Droguet	6	1	4
(Italy) M Berrettini	3	6	6
(Germany) Y Hanfmann	6	6
Q	(France) L Van Assche	2	4
Q	(United States) JJ Wolf	5	6^{0}
(Australia) J Duckworth	7	7^{7}
(Czech Republic) V Kopřiva	6^{5}	4
Q	(France) Q Halys	7^{7}	6

Second round
9	(Czech Republic) J Lehečka	6	6^{3}	6
(Italy) M Berrettini	4	7^{7}	3
(Germany) Y Hanfmann	6^{5}	1
21	(France) A Fils	7^{7}	6
32	(United Kingdom) A Fery	6	2	7^{7}
(Australia) J Duckworth	4	6	6^{4}
Q	(France) Q Halys	6	3	6^{4}
5	(Australia) A de Minaur	1	6	7^{7}

Third round
9	(Czech Republic) J Lehečka	1	7^{9}	3
21	(France) A Fils	6	6^{7}	6
32	(United Kingdom) A Fery	5	6^{3}
5	(Australia) A de Minaur	7	7^{7}

Fourth round
21	(France) A Fils	6	6
5	(Australia) A de Minaur	3	4

=== Bottom half ===
==== Section 5 ====
First round
(United States) A Michelsen	6	6
(Netherlands) J de Jong	4	4
(Spain) D Mérida	3	6	6
WC	(Croatia) M Čilić	6	1	1
(Netherlands) B van de Zandschulp	6	6
LL	(Kazakhstan) A Shevchenko	4	4
Q	(Australia) C O'Connell	6	7^{7}
(Poland) K Majchrzak	4	6^{5}

Second round
6	(United States) T Fritz	6	6
(United States) A Michelsen	3	4
(Spain) D Mérida	6	6
30	(Belgium) Z Bergs	3	2
23	(Brazil) J Fonseca	6	7^{7}
(Netherlands) B van de Zandschulp	4	6^{2}
Q	(Australia) C O'Connell	7	1
11	(Norway) C Ruud	5	2^{r}

Third round
6	(United States) T Fritz	6	6
(Spain) D Mérida	3	4
23	(Brazil) J Fonseca
Q	(Australia) C O'Connell	w/o

Fourth round
6	(United States) T Fritz	6	6
Q	(Australia) C O'Connell	4	3

==== Section 6 ====
First round
(Czech Republic) T Macháč	3	2
(Spain) P Carreño Busta	6	6
(Portugal) N Borges	5	7^{7}	7^{7}
PR	(Australia) T Kokkinakis	7	6^{3}	6^{4}
(United States) A Kovacevic	5	6	7^{7}
K Khachanov	7	3	6^{2}
(Serbia) H Medjedovic	5	6^{2}
Q	(Argentina) M Trungelliti	7	7^{7}

Second round
13	A Rublev	7^{7}	6
(Spain) P Carreño Busta	6^{5}	1
(Portugal) N Borges	6	6
20	(Argentina) F Cerúndolo	4	4
27	(United States) B Nakashima	6	7
(United States) A Kovacevic	2	5
Q	(Argentina) M Trungelliti	4	5
4	D Medvedev	6	7

Third round
13	A Rublev	3	4
(Portugal) N Borges	6	6
27	(United States) B Nakashima	6^{3}	7^{7}	6
4	D Medvedev	7^{7}	6^{4}	1

Fourth round
(Portugal) N Borges	3	7^{7}	3
27	(United States) B Nakashima	6	6^{5}	6

==== Section 7 ====
First round
Q	(Portugal) J Faria	6	6
(United States) J Brooksby	3	2
(Australia) A Walton	7^{7}	6
Q	(Colombia) N Mejía	6^{5}	0
(Hungary) F Marozsán	6	1	6^{1}
Q	(United States) M Zheng	3	6	7^{7}
Q	(Hong Kong) C Wong	6	3	4
(Germany) D Altmaier	3	6	6

Second round
8	(United States) B Shelton	4	4
Q	(Portugal) J Faria	6	6
(Australia) A Walton	6	6
29	(Peru) I Buse	4	3
24	(France) U Humbert	4	3
Q	(United States) M Zheng	6	6
(Germany) D Altmaier	4	2
10	(Italy) L Musetti	6	6

Third round
Q	(Portugal) J Faria	4	6	7^{7}
(Australia) A Walton	6	4	6^{3}
Q	(United States) M Zheng	1	3
10	(Italy) L Musetti	6	6

Fourth round
Q	(Portugal) J Faria	5	2
10	(Italy) L Musetti	7	6

==== Section 8 ====
First round
(Argentina) S Báez	1	6	6
WC	(Bulgaria) G Dimitrov	6	3	4
PR	(China) J Shang	3	3
(Italy) L Sonego	6	6
Q	(Estonia) M Lajal	4	4
(Argentina) JM Cerúndolo	6	6
(France) V Royer	6^{4}	5
(Greece) S Tsitsipas	7^{7}	7

Second round
16	(United States) L Tien	6	7^{7}
(Argentina) S Báez	3	6^{4}
(Italy) L Sonego	3	4
17	(United States) F Tiafoe	6	6
25	(France) A Rinderknech	6	6^{3}	6^{5}
(Argentina) JM Cerúndolo	4	7^{7}	7^{7}
(Greece) S Tsitsipas	3	5
2	(Canada) F Auger-Aliassime	6	7

Third round
16	(United States) L Tien	4	6	4
17	(United States) F Tiafoe	6	4	6
(Argentina) JM Cerúndolo	5	1
2	(Canada) F Auger-Aliassime	7	6

Fourth round
17	(United States) F Tiafoe	6	6
2	(Canada) F Auger-Aliassime	3	4

== Seeded players ==
The following are the seeded players. Seedings are based on ATP rankings as of August 3, 2026. Rankings and points before are as of August 10, 2026.

^{‡}	Champion
^{†}	Runner-up

Seed	Rank	Player	Points before	Points defending	Points earned	Points after	Status
1	3	(Germany) Alexander Zverev	8,090	400	100	7,790	Fourth round lost to (United States) Tommy Paul [18]
2	4	(Canada) Félix Auger-Aliassime	4,690	200	100	4,590	Fourth round lost to (United States) Frances Tiafoe [17]
3	5	(Serbia) Novak Djokovic	3,760	0	10	3,770	Second round lost to (Argentina) Thiago Agustín Tirante
4	7	Daniil Medvedev	3,580	(50)^{∆}	50	3,580	Third round lost to (United States) Brandon Nakashima [27]
5	8	(Australia) Alex de Minaur	3,560	10	100	3,650	Fourth round lost to (France) Arthur Fils [21]
6	9	(United States) Taylor Fritz	3,375	100	200	3,475	Quarterfinals lost to (United States) Brandon Nakashima [27]
7	10	(Italy) Flavio Cobolli	3,330	10	400	3,720	Semifinals lost to (France) Arthur Fils [21]
8	6	(United States) Ben Shelton	3,670	200	10	3,480	Second round lost to (Portugal) Jaime Faria [Q]
9	14	(Czech Republic) Jiří Lehečka	2,470	100	50	2,420	Third round lost to (France) Arthur Fils [21]
10	15	(Italy) Lorenzo Musetti	2,415	10	200	2,605	Quarterfinals lost to (United States) Frances Tiafoe [17]
11	17	(Norway) Casper Ruud	2,385	10	10	2,385	Second round retired against (Australia) Christopher O'Connell [Q]
12	11	(Spain) Rafael Jódar	2,621	(50)^{Ω}	100	2,671	Fourth round lost to (Italy) Flavio Cobolli [7]
13	18	Andrey Rublev	2,230	200	50	2,080	Third round lost to (Portugal) Nuno Borges
14	16	(Czech Republic) Jakub Menšík	2,395	50	100	2,445	Fourth round lost to (Argentina) Thiago Agustín Tirante
15	19	(Monaco) Valentin Vacherot	2,186	(22+6)^{Ω}	10+0	2,168	Second round lost to (Paraguay) Adolfo Daniel Vallejo
16	12	(United States) Learner Tien	2,545	30	50	2,565	Third round lost to (United States) Frances Tiafoe [17]
17	23	(United States) Frances Tiafoe^{†}	2,130	100	650	2,680	Runner-up, lost to (France) Arthur Fils [21]
18	24	(United States) Tommy Paul	2,075	50	200	2,225	Quarterfinals lost to (Italy) Flavio Cobolli [7]
19	20	(Italy) Luciano Darderi	2,175	10	10	2,175	Second round lost to (Australia) Rinky Hijikata [WC]
20	25	(Argentina) Francisco Cerúndolo	1,970	0	10	1,980	Second round lost to (Portugal) Nuno Borges
21	21	(France) Arthur Fils^{‡}	2,140	0	1,000	3,140	Champion, defeated (United States) Frances Tiafoe [17]
22	29	(Chile) Alejandro Tabilo	1,688	(50)^{∆}	50	1,688	Third round lost to (Spain) Rafael Jódar [12]
23	26	(Brazil) João Fonseca	1,800	50	50	1,800	Third round withdrew due to abdominal injury
24	30	(France) Ugo Humbert	1,585	50	10	1,545	Second round lost to (United States) Michael Zheng [Q]
25	28	(France) Arthur Rinderknech	1,723	50	10	1,683	Second round lost to (Argentina) Juan Manuel Cerúndolo
26	31	(Argentina) Tomás Martín Etcheverry	1,470	(40)^{∆}	10	1,440	Second round lost to (France) Térence Atmane
27	22	(United States) Brandon Nakashima	2,135	50	400	2,485	Semifinals lost to (United States) Frances Tiafoe [17]
28	32	(Belgium) Alexander Blockx	1,396	50	50	1,396	Third round lost to (Italy) Flavio Cobolli [7]
29	36	(Peru) Ignacio Buse	1,335	(35)^{Ω}	10	1,310	Second round lost to (Australia) Adam Walton
30	33	(Belgium) Zizou Bergs	1,365	30	10	1,345	Second round lost to (Spain) Daniel Mérida
31	34	(Italy) Matteo Arnaldi	1,349	10	10	1,349	Second round lost to (Spain) Martín Landaluce
32	37	(United Kingdom) Arthur Fery	1,285	10+75	50+3	1,253	Third round lost to (Australia) Alex de Minaur [5]

∆ The player is defending points from his 18th best tournament.
Ω The player is defending points from one or more ATP Challenger Tour events.

=== Withdrawn seeded players ===
The following players would have been seeded, but withdrew before the tournament began.

Rank	Player	Points before	Points defending	Points after	Withdrawal reason
1	(Italy) Jannik Sinner	13,450	650	12,800	Right knee injury
2	(Spain) Carlos Alcaraz	8,160	1,000	7,160	Right wrist injury
13	(Kazakhstan) Alexander Bublik	2,525	0	2,525	Schedule change
27	(Spain) Alejandro Davidovich Fokina	1,780	(50)^{∆}	1,730	Fatigue

∆ The player is defending points from his 18th best tournament.

== Other entry information ==
=== Wildcards ===
- (Croatia) Marin Čilić
- (Bulgaria) Grigor Dimitrov
- (United Kingdom) Jack Draper
- (Australia) Rinky Hijikata
- (France) Gaël Monfils

=== Protected ranking ===
- (Australia) Thanasi Kokkinakis
- (China) Shang Juncheng

=== Withdrawals ===
- ‡ (Spain) Carlos Alcaraz → replaced by (Italy) Mattia Bellucci
- ‡ (Kazakhstan) Alexander Bublik → replaced by (Hungary) Márton Fucsovics
- ‡ (Spain) Alejandro Davidovich Fokina → replaced by (Australia) Adam Walton
- † (Netherlands) Tallon Griekspoor → replaced by (Kazakhstan) Alexander Shevchenko (LL)
- ‡ (United States) Sebastian Korda → replaced by (France) Valentin Royer
- † (France) Corentin Moutet → replaced by (Japan) Sho Shimabukuro (LL)
- ‡ (Spain) Jaume Munar → replaced by (Australia) Thanasi Kokkinakis
- ‡ (United States) Ethan Quinn → replaced by (Italy) Lorenzo Sonego
- ‡ (Denmark) Holger Rune → replaced by (Spain) Daniel Mérida
- ‡ (Italy) Jannik Sinner → replaced by (Greece) Stefanos Tsitsipas

‡ – withdrew from entry list
† – withdrew from main draw

== Qualifying ==
=== Seeds ===
1. (France) Luca Van Assche (qualified)
2. (France) Quentin Halys (qualified)
3. (Portugal) Jaime Faria (qualified)
4. (United States) Marcos Giron (first round)
5. (Kazakhstan) Alexander Shevchenko (qualifying competition, lucky loser)
6. (Argentina) Marco Trungelliti (qualified)
7. (France) Giovanni Mpetshi Perricard (first round)
8. (Hong Kong) Coleman Wong (qualified)
9. (Japan) Sho Shimabukuro (qualifying competition, lucky loser)
10. (France) Hugo Gaston (first round)
11. (United States) Martin Damm (first round)
12. (Australia) Aleksandar Vukic (qualifying competition)
13. (France) Benjamin Bonzi (first round)
14. (Argentina) Francisco Comesaña (first round)
15. (United Kingdom) Toby Samuel (withdrew)
16. (United Kingdom) Jacob Fearnley (first round)
17. (Czech Republic) Dalibor Svrčina (first round)
18. (United States) Michael Zheng (qualified)
19. (Finland) Otto Virtanen (qualifying competition)
20. (China) Wu Yibing (qualifying competition)
21. (China) Bu Yunchaokete (qualifying competition)
22. (France) Titouan Droguet (qualified)
23. (France) Kyrian Jacquet (qualified)
24. (Australia) Dane Sweeny (first round)

=== Qualifiers ===
1. (France) Luca Van Assche
2. (France) Quentin Halys
3. (Portugal) Jaime Faria
4. (Colombia) Nicolás Mejía
5. (Australia) Christopher O'Connell
6. (Argentina) Marco Trungelliti
7. (United States) Michael Zheng
8. (Hong Kong) Coleman Wong
9. (United States) J.J. Wolf
10. (France) Kyrian Jacquet
11. (France) Titouan Droguet
12. (Estonia) Mark Lajal

=== Lucky losers ===
1. (Japan) Sho Shimabukuro
2. (Kazakhstan) Alexander Shevchenko

=== Qualifying draw ===
==== First qualifier ====
First round
1	(France) Luca Van Assche	6	6
(Brazil) Gustavo Heide	3	4
(Serbia) Dušan Lajović	2	7^{7}	7^{9}
13	(France) Benjamin Bonzi	6	6^{2}	6^{7}

Qualifying competition
1	(France) Luca Van Assche	7^{7}	2	6
(Serbia) Dušan Lajović	6^{5}	6	3

==== Second qualifier ====
First round
2	(France) Quentin Halys	4	7^{7}	6
(South Korea) Kwon Soon-woo	6	6^{5}	4
(Italy) Francesco Maestrelli	6^{6}	4
21	(China) Bu Yunchaokete	7^{8}	6

Qualifying competition
2	(France) Quentin Halys	6	7^{7}
21	(China) Bu Yunchaokete	2	6^{2}

==== Third qualifier ====
First round
3	(Portugal) Jaime Faria	6	6
(Georgia (country)) Nikoloz Basilashvili	4	4
(United States) Mackenzie McDonald	6^{7}	6	5
20	(China) Wu Yibing	7^{9}	1	7

Qualifying competition
3	(Portugal) Jaime Faria	6	7
20	(China) Wu Yibing	3	5

==== Fourth qualifier ====
First round
4	(United States) Marcos Giron	4	6^{6}
(Portugal) Henrique Rocha	6	7^{8}
(Colombia) Nicolás Mejía	6	3	6
16	(United Kingdom) Jacob Fearnley	3	6	2

Qualifying competition
(Portugal) Henrique Rocha	5	6	3
(Colombia) Nicolás Mejía	7	4	6

==== Fifth qualifier ====
First round
5	(Kazakhstan) Alexander Shevchenko	6	6
(Spain) Pablo Llamas Ruiz	3	4
(Australia) Christopher O'Connell	6^{3}	6	7
24	(Australia) Dane Sweeny	7^{7}	2	5

Qualifying competition
5	(Kazakhstan) Alexander Shevchenko	4	1
(Australia) Christopher O'Connell	6	6

==== Sixth qualifier ====
First round
6	(Argentina) Marco Trungelliti	4	6	7^{7}
(Austria) Sebastian Ofner	6	4	6^{4}
WC	(Japan) Kei Nishikori	6	1	7
14	(Argentina) Francisco Comesaña	4	6	5

Qualifying competition
6	(Argentina) Marco Trungelliti	4	7	6
WC	(Japan) Kei Nishikori	6	5	3

==== Seventh qualifier ====
First round
7	(France) Giovanni Mpetshi Perricard	1	6	2
WC	(United States) Trevor Svajda	6	1	6
(Tunisia) Moez Echargui	7	2	4
18	(United States) Michael Zheng	5	6	6

Qualifying competition
WC	(United States) Trevor Svajda	6	5	3
18	(United States) Michael Zheng	4	7	6

==== Eighth qualifier ====
First round
8	(Hong Kong) Coleman Wong	6	6
PR	(South Korea) Hong Seong-chan	4	2
WC	(United States) Vignesh Gogineni	3	1
19	(Finland) Otto Virtanen	6	6

Qualifying competition
8	(Hong Kong) Coleman Wong	7^{7}	7^{7}
19	(Finland) Otto Virtanen	6^{4}	6^{2}

==== Ninth qualifier ====
First round
9	(Japan) Sho Shimabukuro	6	6
(Bolivia) Hugo Dellien	3	1
WC	(United States) J.J. Wolf	6	2	6
Alt	(Japan) Shintaro Mochizuki	2	6	3

Qualifying competition
9	(Japan) Sho Shimabukuro	3	6	5
WC	(United States) J.J. Wolf	6	3	7

==== Tenth qualifier ====
First round
10	(France) Hugo Gaston	2	6	4
(Norway) Nicolai Budkov Kjær	6	3	6
(United Kingdom) Billy Harris	2	1
23	(France) Kyrian Jacquet	6	6

Qualifying competition
(Norway) Nicolai Budkov Kjær	5	4
23	(France) Kyrian Jacquet	7	6

==== Eleventh qualifier ====
First round
11	(United States) Martin Damm	4	6^{4}
(Greece) Stefanos Sakellaridis	6	7^{7}
(Australia) Alexei Popyrin	6^{2}	1
22	(France) Titouan Droguet	7^{7}	6

Qualifying competition
(Greece) Stefanos Sakellaridis	4	2
22	(France) Titouan Droguet	6	6

==== Twelfth qualifier ====
First round
12	(Australia) Aleksandar Vukic	6	7^{7}
WC	(United States) Darwin Blanch	3	6^{4}
(Estonia) Mark Lajal	5	6	6
17	(Czech Republic) Dalibor Svrčina	7	4	3

Qualifying competition
12	(Australia) Aleksandar Vukic	7^{7}	3	4
(Estonia) Mark Lajal	6^{3}	6	6
