= 2026 Mutua Madrid Open – Men's singles =

Men's singles
- 2026 Mutua Madrid Open

Final
- Champion: (Italy) Jannik Sinner
- Runner-up: (Germany) Alexander Zverev
- Score: 6–1, 6–2
- Date: 3 May 2026

Details
- Draw: 96 (12Q, 5WC)
- Seeds: 32

Events
Singles	men	women
Doubles	men	women
- Madrid Open

Jannik Sinner defeated Alexander Zverev in the final, 6–1, 6–2 to win the men's singles tennis title at the 2026 Madrid Open. It was his ninth ATP Masters 1000 title and 28th ATP Tour title overall. Sinner became the first man to win all the first four ATP Masters 1000 events of a season, as well as the first to win five consecutive Masters 1000 titles, since the series started in 1990, surpassing the record of four consecutive titles by Novak Djokovic and Rafael Nadal. By reaching the final, Sinner became the youngest man in history, and the fourth overall alongside the Big Three, to reach the final at all nine Masters 1000 tournaments.

Casper Ruud was the defending champion, but lost in the quarterfinals to Alexander Blockx.

== Seeds ==
All seeds received a bye into the second round.

1. (Italy) Jannik Sinner (champion)
2. (Germany) Alexander Zverev (final)
3. (Canada) Félix Auger-Aliassime (third round)
4. (United States) Ben Shelton (second round)
5. (Australia) Alex de Minaur (second round)
6. (Italy) Lorenzo Musetti (fourth round)
7. Daniil Medvedev (fourth round)
8. (Kazakhstan) Alexander Bublik (second round)
9. Andrey Rublev (second round)
10. (Italy) Flavio Cobolli (quarterfinals)
11. (Czech Republic) Jiří Lehečka (quarterfinals)
12. (Norway) Casper Ruud (quarterfinals)
13. Karen Khachanov (third round)
14. (Monaco) Valentin Vacherot (second round)
15. (United States) Tommy Paul (second round)
16. (Argentina) Francisco Cerúndolo (fourth round)
17. (United States) Learner Tien (second round)
18. (Italy) Luciano Darderi (third round)
19. (United Kingdom) Cameron Norrie (fourth round)
20. (Spain) Alejandro Davidovich Fokina (third round)
21. (France) Arthur Fils (semifinals)
22. (France) Arthur Rinderknech (third round, retired)
23. (Czech Republic) Jakub Menšík (fourth round)
24. (United Kingdom) Jack Draper (withdrew)
25. (Argentina) Tomás Martín Etcheverry (fourth round)
26. (France) Corentin Moutet (second round)
27. (Brazil) João Fonseca (third round)
28. (United States) Brandon Nakashima (second round)
29. (Netherlands) Tallon Griekspoor (third round)
30. (France) Ugo Humbert (second round)
31. (Canada) Denis Shapovalov (second round)
32. (Canada) Gabriel Diallo (second round, retired)
33. (United States) Alex Michelsen (third round)

Click on the seed number of a player to go to their draw section.

== Draw ==
Key

- Q = Qualifier
- WC = Wild card
- LL = Lucky loser
- Alt = Alternate
- ITF = ITF entry
- PR = Protected ranking
- SR = Special ranking
- SE = Special exempt
- JE = Junior exempt
- JR = Junior Accelerator Programme entrant
- CO = College Accelerator Programme entrant
- NG = Next Gen Accelerator Program entrant
- w/o = Walkover
- r = Retired
- d = Defaulted

=== Finals ===
Quarterfinals
1	(Italy) Jannik Sinner	6	7^{7}
WC	(Spain) Rafael Jódar	2	6^{0}
21	(France) Arthur Fils	6	6
11	(Czech Republic) Jiří Lehečka	3	4
12	(Norway) Casper Ruud	4	4
(Belgium) Alexander Blockx	6	6
10	(Italy) Flavio Cobolli	1	4
2	(Germany) Alexander Zverev	6	6

Semifinals
1	(Italy) Jannik Sinner	6	6
21	(France) Arthur Fils	2	4
(Belgium) Alexander Blockx	2	5
2	(Germany) Alexander Zverev	6	7

Final
1	(Italy) Jannik Sinner	6	6
2	(Germany) Alexander Zverev	1	2

=== Top half ===
==== Section 1 ====
First round
Q	(France) B Bonzi	6^{4}	7^{7}	6
Q	(France) T Droguet	7^{7}	6^{4}	4
Q	(Denmark) E Møller	6	7^{7}
WC	(Italy) F Cinà	4	6^{4}
(Czech Republic) T Macháč	3	7^{7}	6
(Argentina) F Comesaña	6	6^{3}	3
(Spain) R Bautista Agut	2	4
(Argentina) TA Tirante	6	6

Second round
1	(Italy) J Sinner	6^{6}	6	6
Q	(France) B Bonzi	7^{8}	1	4
Q	(Denmark) E Møller	7	3
32	(Canada) G Diallo	5	3^{r}
19	(United Kingdom) C Norrie	6	6^{6}	7^{7}
(Czech Republic) T Macháč	2	7^{8}	6^{5}
(Argentina) TA Tirante	7	6
15	(United States) T Paul	5	4

Third round
1	(Italy) J Sinner	6	6
Q	(Denmark) E Møller	2	3
19	(United Kingdom) C Norrie	7	7^{7}
(Argentina) TA Tirante	5	6^{5}

Fourth round
1	(Italy) J Sinner	6	7
19	(United Kingdom) C Norrie	2	5

==== Section 2 ====
First round
PR	(China) Z Zhang	2	0
(Czech Republic) V Kopřiva	6	6
(Italy) L Sonego	3	6^{1}
Q	(Serbia) D Lajović	6	7^{7}
(Belgium) Z Bergs	6	3	4
(Croatia) M Čilić	4	6	6
WC	(Spain) R Jódar	2	7	6
(Netherlands) J de Jong	6	5	4

Second round
9	A Rublev	3	4
(Czech Republic) V Kopřiva	6	6
Q	(Serbia) D Lajović	3	2
22	(France) A Rinderknech	6	6
27	(Brazil) J Fonseca	w/o
(Croatia) M Čilić
WC	(Spain) R Jódar	6	6
5	(Australia) A de Minaur	3	1

Third round
(Czech Republic) V Kopřiva	6	3	0
22	(France) A Rinderknech	4	6	0^{r}
27	(Brazil) J Fonseca	6^{4}	6	1
WC	(Spain) R Jódar	7^{7}	4	6

Fourth round
(Czech Republic) V Kopřiva	5	0
WC	(Spain) R Jódar	7	6

==== Section 3 ====
First round
Q	(Croatia) D Prižmić	6	6
(Italy) M Berrettini	3	4
Q	(Georgia (country)) N Basilashvili	6^{5}	6^{0}
(Austria) S Ofner	7^{7}	7^{7}
(Peru) I Buse	6	6
(France) A Mannarino	4	2
(United States) J Brooksby	3	5
(United States) E Nava	6	7

Second round
4	(United States) B Shelton	4	7^{7}	6^{5}
Q	(Croatia) D Prižmić	6	6^{4}	7^{7}
(Austria) S Ofner	4	4
25	(Argentina) TM Etcheverry	6	6
21	(France) A Fils	6^{4}	7^{7}	7
(Peru) I Buse	7^{7}	6^{3}	5
(United States) E Nava	6^{5}	7^{7}	6
14	(Monaco) V Vacherot	7^{7}	6^{1}	3

Third round
Q	(Croatia) D Prižmić	6	4	3
25	(Argentina) TM Etcheverry	2	6	6
21	(France) A Fils	7^{7}	6
(United States) E Nava	6^{2}	3

Fourth round
25	(Argentina) TM Etcheverry	3	4
21	(France) A Fils	6	6

==== Section 4 ====
First round
(Chile) A Tabilo	6	6
(France) V Royer	2	4
(France) A Müller	6^{3}	0
(Germany) J-L Struff	7^{7}	6
(Bosnia and Herzegovina) D Džumhur	6	6
(Italy) M Bellucci	2	4
Q	(Portugal) J Faria	3	3
(Poland) H Hurkacz	6	6

Second round
11	(Czech Republic) J Lehečka	3	7^{7}	6
(Chile) A Tabilo	6	6^{3}	4
(Germany) J-L Struff	2	1
33	(United States) A Michelsen	6	6
29	(Netherlands) T Griekspoor	6	6
(Bosnia and Herzegovina) D Džumhur	3	4
(Poland) H Hurkacz	4	6^{4}
6	(Italy) L Musetti	6	7^{7}

Third round
11	(Czech Republic) J Lehečka	6	6
33	(United States) A Michelsen	4	2
29	(Netherlands) T Griekspoor	4	5
6	(Italy) L Musetti	6	7

Fourth round
11	(Czech Republic) J Lehečka	6	6
6	(Italy) L Musetti	3	3

=== Bottom half ===
==== Section 5 ====
First round
LL	(United States) P Kypson	6	6^{6}	6^{4}
(Greece) S Tsitsipas	3	7^{8}	7^{7}
LL	(Argentina) M Trungelliti	4	6	6^{6}
Q	(Spain) D Mérida	6	1	7^{8}
WC	(Spain) P Carreño Busta	4	7^{7}	6
(Hungary) M Fucsovics	6	6^{5}	2
(Spain) J Munar	6	6
(Kazakhstan) A Shevchenko	4	1

Second round
8	(Kazakhstan) A Bublik	2	5
(Greece) S Tsitsipas	6	7
Q	(Spain) D Mérida	6	6
26	(France) C Moutet	3	4
20	(Spain) A Davidovich Fokina	6	6
WC	(Spain) P Carreño Busta	3	3
(Spain) J Munar	0	1
12	(Norway) C Ruud	6	6

Third round
(Greece) S Tsitsipas	6	6
Q	(Spain) D Mérida	4	2
20	(Spain) A Davidovich Fokina	3	1
12	(Norway) C Ruud	6	6

Fourth round
(Greece) S Tsitsipas	7^{7}	6^{2}	6^{3}
12	(Norway) C Ruud	6^{4}	7^{7}	7^{7}

==== Section 6 ====
First round
(Germany) Y Hanfmann	6	6^{3}	7
(United States) M Giron	4	7^{7}	5
(Germany) D Altmaier	4	4
(Argentina) JM Cerúndolo	6	6
LL	(Chile) C Garín	6	5	5
(Belgium) A Blockx	4	7	7
Q	(Lithuania) V Gaubas	7	6
(Argentina) S Báez	5	1

Second round
16	(Argentina) F Cerúndolo	6	7
(Germany) Y Hanfmann	1	5
(Argentina) JM Cerúndolo	1	3
18	(Italy) L Darderi	6	6
28	(United States) B Nakashima	6	3	4
(Belgium) A Blockx	3	6	6
Q	(Lithuania) V Gaubas	3	4
3	(Canada) F Auger-Aliassime	6	6

Third round
16	(Argentina) F Cerúndolo	6	6
18	(Italy) L Darderi	2	3
(Belgium) A Blockx	7^{7}	6
3	(Canada) F Auger-Aliassime	6^{3}	3

Fourth round
16	(Argentina) F Cerúndolo	6^{8}	2
(Belgium) A Blockx	7^{10}	6

==== Section 7 ====
First round
(Hungary) F Marozsán	7^{7}	7^{8}
(United States) E Quinn	6^{5}	6^{6}
Q	(Norway) N Budkov Kjær	5
(United States) R Opelka	3^{r}
Q	(Paraguay) AD Vallejo	6	6
(Bulgaria) G Dimitrov	4	4
(Argentina) C Ugo Carabelli	6	6
WC	(France) G Monfils	3	4

Second round
7	D Medvedev	6	6^{3}	6
(Hungary) F Marozsán	2	7^{7}	4
Q	(Norway) N Budkov Kjær	6	6
31	(Canada) D Shapovalov	2	1
17	(United States) L Tien	4	3
Q	(Paraguay) AD Vallejo	6	6
(Argentina) C Ugo Carabelli	7^{9}	1	4
10	(Italy) F Cobolli	6^{7}	6	6

Third round
7	D Medvedev	6	6
Q	(Norway) N Budkov Kjær	3	2
Q	(Paraguay) AD Vallejo	3	2
10	(Italy) F Cobolli	6	6

Fourth round
7	D Medvedev	3	7	4
10	(Italy) F Cobolli	6	5	6

==== Section 8 ====
First round
WC	(Spain) M Landaluce	2	3
(Australia) A Walton	6	6
(Australia) A Popyrin	6^{7}	4
Q	(United States) M Damm	7^{9}	6
(France) T Atmane	6	7
(Serbia) M Kecmanović	4	5
(Portugal) N Borges	3	4
(Argentina) M Navone	6	6

Second round
13	K Khachanov	6	6
(Australia) A Walton	2	3
Q	(United States) M Damm	3	4
23	(Czech Republic) J Menšík	6	6
30	(France) U Humbert	6^{3}	6^{5}
(France) T Atmane	7^{7}	7^{7}
(Argentina) M Navone	1	6	3
2	(Germany) A Zverev	6	3	6

Third round
13	K Khachanov	4	6^{11}
23	(Czech Republic) J Menšík	6	7^{13}
(France) T Atmane	3	6^{2}
2	(Germany) A Zverev	6	7^{7}

Fourth round
23	(Czech Republic) J Menšík	4	7^{7}	3
2	(Germany) A Zverev	6	6^{4}	6

== Seeded players ==
The following are the seeded players. Seedings are based on ATP rankings as of 20 April 2026. Rankings and points before are as of 20 April 2026.

^{‡}	Champion
^{†}	Runner-up

Seed	Rank	Player	Points before	Points defending	Points won	Points after	Status
1	1	(Italy) Jannik Sinner^{‡}	13,350	0	1,000	14,350	Champion, defeated (Germany) Alexander Zverev [2]
2	3	(Germany) Alexander Zverev^{†}	5,255	100	650	5,805	Runner-up, lost to (Italy) Jannik Sinner [1]
3	5	(Canada) Félix Auger-Aliassime	4,100	(100)^{∆}	50	4,050	Third round lost to (Belgium) Alexander Blockx
4	6	(United States) Ben Shelton	4,070	50	10	4,030	Second round lost to (Croatia) Dino Prižmić [Q]
5	8	(Australia) Alex de Minaur	3,845	100	10	3,755	Second round lost to (Spain) Rafael Jódar [WC]
6	9	(Italy) Lorenzo Musetti	3,715	400	100	3,415	Fourth round lost to (Czech Republic) Jiří Lehečka [11]
7	10	Daniil Medvedev	3,560	200	100	3,460	Fourth round lost to (Italy) Flavio Cobolli [10]
8	11	(Kazakhstan) Alexander Bublik	3,445	100	10	3,355	Second round lost to (Greece) Stefanos Tsitsipas
9	12	Andrey Rublev	2,630	50	10	2,590	Second round lost to (Czech Republic) Vít Kopřiva
10	13	(Italy) Flavio Cobolli	2,600	50	200	2,750	Quarterfinals lost to (Germany) Alexander Zverev [2]
11	14	(Czech Republic) Jiří Lehečka	2,540	(25)^{∆}	200	2,715	Quarterfinals lost to (France) Arthur Fils [21]
12	15	(Norway) Casper Ruud	2,535	1,000	200	1,735	Quarterfinals lost to (Belgium) Alexander Blockx
13	16	Karen Khachanov	2,220	50	50	2,220	Third round lost to (Czech Republic) Jakub Menšík [23]
14	17	(Monaco) Valentin Vacherot	2,168	(31)^{Ω}	10	2,147	Second round lost to (United States) Emilio Nava
15	18	(United States) Tommy Paul	2,065	100	10	1,975	Second round lost to (Argentina) Thiago Agustín Tirante
16	20	(Argentina) Francisco Cerúndolo	1,920	400	100	1,620	Fourth round lost to (Belgium) Alexander Blockx
17	21	(United States) Learner Tien	1,885	(25)^{∆}	10	1,870	Second round lost to (Paraguay) Daniel Vallejo [Q]
18	22	(Italy) Luciano Darderi	1,870	30	50	1,890	Third round lost to (Argentina) Francisco Cerúndolo [16]
19	23	(United Kingdom) Cameron Norrie	1,868	50	100	1,918	Fourth round lost fo (Italy) Jannik Sinner [1]
20	24	(Spain) Alejandro Davidovich Fokina	1,820	50	50	1,820	Third round lost to (Norway) Casper Ruud [12]
21	25	(France) Arthur Fils	1,740	10	400	2,130	Semifinals lost to (Italy) Jannik Sinner [1]
22	26	(France) Arthur Rinderknech	1,716	30	50	1,736	Third round retired against (Czech Republic) Vít Kopřiva
23	27	(Czech Republic) Jakub Menšík	1,700	200	100	1,600	Fourth round lost to (Germany) Alexander Zverev [2]
~~24~~	~~28~~	~~(United Kingdom) Jack Draper~~	1,610	650	0	960	Withdrew due to knee injury
25	29	(Argentina) Tomás Martín Etcheverry	1,590	30	100	1,660	Fourth round lost to (France) Arthur Fils [21]
26	30	(France) Corentin Moutet	1,433	(30)^{∆}	10	1,413	Second round lost to (Spain) Daniel Mérida [Q]
27	31	(Brazil) João Fonseca	1,415	30	50	1,435	Third round lost to (Spain) Rafael Jódar [WC]
28	32	(United States) Brandon Nakashima	1,385	100	10	1,295	Second round lost to (Belgium) Alexander Blockx
29	33	(Netherlands) Tallon Griekspoor	1,340	30	50	1,360	Third round lost to (Italy) Lorenzo Musetti [6]
30	34	(France) Ugo Humbert	1,320	(50)^{∆}	10	1,280	Second round vs. (France) Térence Atmane
31	35	(Canada) Denis Shapovalov	1,210	50	10	1,170	Second round lost to (Norway) Nicolai Budkov Kjær [Q]
32	36	(Canada) Gabriel Diallo	1,200	210	10	1,000	Second round retired against (Denmark) Elmer Møller [Q]
33	37	(United States) Alex Michelsen	1,200	10+175	50+25	1,090	Third round lost to (Czech Republic) Jiří Lehečka [11]

∆ The player is defending points from his 18th best tournament.
Ω The player is defending points from an ATP Challenger Tour event.

=== Withdrawn seeded players ===
The following players would have been seeded, but withdrew before the tournament began.

Rank	Player	Points before	Points defending	Points after	Withdrawal reason
2	(Spain) Carlos Alcaraz	12,960	0	12,960	Wrist Injury
4	(Serbia) Novak Djokovic	4,710	10	4,700	Shoulder injury
7	(United States) Taylor Fritz	3,870	100	3,770	Knee injury
19	(United States) Frances Tiafoe	1,965	100	1,865	

== Other entry information ==
=== Wildcards ===
- (Spain) Pablo Carreño Busta
- (Italy) Federico Cinà
- (Spain) Rafael Jódar
- (Spain) Martín Landaluce
- (France) Gaël Monfils

=== Protected ranking ===
- (China) Zhang Zhizhen

=== Withdrawals ===
- ‡ (Spain) Carlos Alcaraz → replaced by (Austria) Sebastian Ofner
- ‡ (France) Arthur Cazaux → replaced by (Argentina) Thiago Agustín Tirante
- † (Belgium) Raphaël Collignon → replaced by (Argentina) Marco Trungelliti (LL)
- ‡ (Serbia) Novak Djokovic → replaced by (Australia) Adam Walton
- † (United Kingdom) Jack Draper → replaced by (United States) Patrick Kypson (LL)
- ‡ (United States) Taylor Fritz → replaced by (Spain) Roberto Bautista Agut
- ‡ (United States) Sebastian Korda → replaced by (Kazakhstan) Alexander Shevchenko
- ‡ (Poland) Kamil Majchrzak → replaced by (Belgium) Alexander Blockx
- ‡ (France) Giovanni Mpetshi Perricard → replaced by (France) Alexandre Müller
- ‡ (Denmark) Holger Rune → replaced by (Argentina) Francisco Comesaña
- ‡ (United States) Frances Tiafoe → replaced by (Netherlands) Jesper de Jong
- † (Netherlands) Botic van de Zandschulp → replaced by (Chile) Cristian Garín (LL)

‡ – withdrew from entry list
† – withdrew from main draw

== Qualifying ==
=== Seeds ===
1. (Argentina) Marco Trungelliti (qualifying competition, lucky loser)
2. (Chile) Cristian Garín (qualifying competition, lucky loser)
3. (United States) Zachary Svajda (first round)
4. (Croatia) Dino Prižmić (qualified)
5. (Australia) Aleksandar Vukic (first round)
6. (France) Quentin Halys (first round)
7. (United States) Patrick Kypson (qualifying competition, lucky loser)
8. (Paraguay) Daniel Vallejo (qualified)
9. (United States) Aleksandar Kovacevic (first round)
10. (France) Luca Van Assche (first round)
11. (China) Wu Yibing (qualifying competition)
12. (Australia) Rinky Hijikata (first round)
13. (Spain) Daniel Mérida (qualified)
14. (Italy) Matteo Arnaldi (first round)
15. (France) Benjamin Bonzi (qualified)
16. (Italy) Francesco Maestrelli (first round)
17. (France) Titouan Droguet (qualified)
18. (France) Hugo Gaston (first round)
19. (United Kingdom) Jan Choinski (first round)
20. (Georgia (country)) Nikoloz Basilashvili (qualified)
21. (Chile) Tomás Barrios Vera (first round)
22. (Lithuania) Vilius Gaubas (qualified)
23. (United States) Mackenzie McDonald (first round)
24. (United States) Martin Damm (qualified)

=== Qualifiers ===
1. (Spain) Daniel Mérida
2. (United States) Martin Damm
3. (Lithuania) Vilius Gaubas
4. (Croatia) Dino Prižmić
5. (Denmark) Elmer Møller
6. (Portugal) Jaime Faria
7. (Georgia (country)) Nikoloz Basilashvili
8. (Paraguay) Daniel Vallejo
9. (Norway) Nicolai Budkov Kjær
10. (France) Benjamin Bonzi
11. (France) Titouan Droguet
12. (Serbia) Dušan Lajović

=== Lucky losers ===
1. (Argentina) Marco Trungelliti
2. (United States) Patrick Kypson
3. (Chile) Cristian Garín

=== Qualifying draw ===
==== First qualifier ====
First round
1	(Argentina) Marco Trungelliti	6	6
(Croatia) Borna Gojo	4	3
(United Kingdom) Billy Harris	3	5
13	(Spain) Daniel Mérida	6	7

Qualifying competition
1	(Argentina) Marco Trungelliti	6^{4}	3
13	(Spain) Daniel Mérida	7^{7}	6

==== Second qualifier ====
First round
2	(Chile) Cristian Garín	7	6
Alt	(France) Ugo Blanchet	5	4
(Italy) Andrea Pellegrino	0	6^{5}
24	(United States) Martin Damm	6	7

Qualifying competition
2	(Chile) Cristian Garín	6	4	6^{5}
24	(United States) Martin Damm	2	6	7^{7}

==== Third qualifier ====
First round
3	(United States) Zachary Svajda	6^{9}	1
WC	(Japan) Rei Sakamoto	7	6
(France) Arthur Géa	2	4
22	(Lithuania) Vilius Gaubas	6	6

Qualifying competition
WC	(Japan) Rei Sakamoto	6^{5}	7^{7}	6^{4}
22	(Lithuania) Vilius Gaubas	7^{7}	6^{5}	7^{7}

==== Fourth qualifier ====
First round
4	(Croatia) Dino Prižmić	7^{11}	6^{5}	7^{7}
(Australia) Christopher O'Connell	6^{9}	7^{7}	6^{3}
(Hungary) Zsombor Piros	6	7
21	(Chile) Tomás Barrios Vera	3	5

Qualifying competition
4	(Croatia) Dino Prižmić	6	6
(Hungary) Zsombor Piros	3	2

==== Fifth qualifier ====
First round
5	(Australia) Aleksandar Vukic	4	2
(Spain) Pablo Llamas Ruiz	6	6
(Denmark) Elmer Møller	6	6
18	(France) Hugo Gaston	3	3

Qualifying competition
(Spain) Pablo Llamas Ruiz	6^{4}	3
(Denmark) Elmer Møller	7^{7}	6

==== Sixth qualifier ====
First round
6	(France) Quentin Halys	7^{11}	3	4
(Portugal) Jaime Faria	6^{9}	6	6
(South Africa) Lloyd Harris	6	6
23	(United States) Mackenzie McDonald	4	2

Qualifying competition
(Portugal) Jaime Faria	4	6	0
(South Africa) Lloyd Harris	6	3	0^{r}

==== Seventh qualifier ====
First round
7	(United States) Patrick Kypson	6	6
WC	(France) Moïse Kouamé	2	2
(Italy) Stefano Travaglia	6^{4}	4
20	(Georgia (country)) Nikoloz Basilashvili	7^{7}	6

Qualifying competition
7	(United States) Patrick Kypson	7^{7}	6^{3}	4
20	(Georgia (country)) Nikoloz Basilashvili	6^{2}	7^{7}	6

==== Eighth qualifier ====
First round
8	(Paraguay) Daniel Vallejo	6	6
(Spain) Pedro Martínez	3	1
(Portugal) Henrique Rocha	7^{7}	6^{5}	7
19	(United Kingdom) Jan Choinski	6^{5}	7^{7}	5

Qualifying competition
8	(Paraguay) Daniel Vallejo	6	4	6
(Portugal) Henrique Rocha	1	6	2

==== Ninth qualifier ====
First round
9	(United States) Aleksandar Kovacevic	6	4	6^{3}
(Tunisia) Moez Echargui	4	6	7^{7}
(Norway) Nicolai Budkov Kjær	6	6
16	(Italy) Francesco Maestrelli	4	4

Qualifying competition
(Tunisia) Moez Echargui	1	0
(Norway) Nicolai Budkov Kjær	6	6

==== Tenth qualifier ====
First round
10	(France) Luca Van Assche	3	2
WC	(Germany) Diego Dedura	6	6
WC	(United States) Darwin Blanch	3	6^{2}
15	(France) Benjamin Bonzi	6	7^{7}

Qualifying competition
WC	(Germany) Diego Dedura	2	1
15	(France) Benjamin Bonzi	6	6

==== Eleventh qualifier ====
First round
11	(China) Wu Yibing	6	7
WC	(India) Manas Dhamne	1	5
(Finland) Otto Virtanen	6	3	3
17	(France) Titouan Droguet	2	6	6

Qualifying competition
11	(China) Wu Yibing	0	6^{5}
17	(France) Titouan Droguet	6	7^{7}

==== Twelfth qualifier ====
First round
12	(Australia) Rinky Hijikata	6^{2}	2
(Luxembourg) Chris Rodesch	7^{7}	6
(Serbia) Dušan Lajović	6	3	6
14	(Italy) Matteo Arnaldi	0	6	4

Qualifying competition
(Luxembourg) Chris Rodesch	4	4
(Serbia) Dušan Lajović	6	6
