= Brasília Tennis Open =

- 2026 Brasília Tennis Open

ATP Challenger Tour
- Location: Brasília, Brazil
- Category: ATP Challenger Tour
- Surface: Clay

The Brasília Tennis Open is a professional tennis tournament played on clay courts. It is currently part of the ATP Challenger Tour. It was first held in Brasília, Brazil in 2026.

== Past finals ==
=== Singles ===
Year	Champion	Runner-up	Score
2026	(Portugal) Henrique Rocha	(Paraguay) Daniel Vallejo	6–4, 6–4

=== Doubles ===
Year	Champions	Runners-up	Score
2026	(Portugal) Jaime Faria (Portugal) Henrique Rocha	(Argentina) Mariano Kestelboim (Brazil) Marcelo Zormann	6–3, 6–2
