= 2026 Brasília Tennis Open – Doubles =

Doubles
- 2026 Brasília Tennis Open

Final
- Champions: (Portugal) Jaime Faria (Portugal) Henrique Rocha
- Runners-up: (Argentina) Mariano Kestelboim (Brazil) Marcelo Zormann
- Score: 6–3, 6–2

Events
Singles	Doubles
- Brasília Tennis Open

This was the first edition of the tournament.

Jaime Faria and Henrique Rocha won the title after defeating Mariano Kestelboim and Marcelo Zormann 6–3, 6–2 in the final.

== Seeds ==
1. (Uruguay) Ariel Behar / (Ecuador) Diego Hidalgo (first round)
2. (Argentina) Mariano Kestelboim / (Brazil) Marcelo Zormann (final)
3. (Uruguay) Ignacio Carou / (Bolivia) Federico Zeballos (quarterfinals)
4. (Bolivia) Boris Arias / (Brazil) Daniel Dutra da Silva (first round)

== Draw ==
Key

- Q = Qualifier
- WC = Wild card
- LL = Lucky loser
- Alt = Alternate
- ITF = ITF entry
- PR = Protected ranking
- SR = Special ranking
- SE = Special exempt
- JE = Junior exempt
- JR = Junior Accelerator Programme entrant
- CO = College Accelerator Programme entrant
- NG = Next Gen Accelerator Program entrant
- w/o = Walkover
- r = Retired
- d = Defaulted

First round
1	(Uruguay) A Behar (Ecuador) D Hidalgo	6^{4}	4
(Brazil) I Marcondes (Brazil) E Ribeiro	7^{7}	6
Alt	(Brazil) Breno Braga (Brazil) Victor Braga	2	3
(Spain) M Damas (Spain) N Sánchez Izquierdo	6	6
4	(Bolivia) B Arias (Brazil) D Dutra da Silva	2	3
(Portugal) J Faria (Portugal) H Rocha	6	6
(Brazil) P Sakamoto (Brazil) PA Saraiva dos Santos	6	7
(Argentina) S de la Fuente (Uruguay) F Roncadelli	2	5
(Italy) G Cadenasso (Spain) C Sánchez Jover	6	6
Alt	(United States) Ryan Dickerson (Brazil) Victor Hugo Remondy Pagotto	4	1
(Brazil) L Britto (Brazil) Bruno Oliveira	2	6^{5}
3	(Uruguay) I Carou (Bolivia) F Zeballos	6	7^{7}
WC	(Brazil) P Boscardin Dias (Brazil) João Eduardo Schiessl	7^{8}	6
WC	(Brazil) G Miguel (Brazil) LF Miguel	6^{6}	3

Quarterfinals
(Brazil) I Marcondes (Brazil) E Ribeiro	6	6
(Spain) M Damas (Spain) N Sánchez Izquierdo	2	4
(Portugal) J Faria (Portugal) H Rocha	1	6	[10]
(Brazil) P Sakamoto (Brazil) PA Saraiva dos Santos	6	3	[3]
(Italy) G Cadenasso (Spain) C Sánchez Jover	6	7
3	(Uruguay) I Carou (Bolivia) F Zeballos	3	5
WC	(Brazil) P Boscardin Dias (Brazil) JE Schiessl
2	(Argentina) M Kestelboim (Brazil) M Zormann	w/o

Semifinals
(Brazil) I Marcondes (Brazil) E Ribeiro	3	7	[3]
(Portugal) J Faria (Portugal) H Rocha	6	5	[10]
(Italy) G Cadenasso (Spain) C Sánchez Jover	3	5
2	(Argentina) M Kestelboim (Brazil) M Zormann	6	7

Final
(Portugal) J Faria (Portugal) H Rocha	6	6
2	(Argentina) M Kestelboim (Brazil) M Zormann	3	2
