= 2025 Australian Open – Men's singles qualifying =

Men's singles qualifying
- 2025 Australian Open

Events
Singles	men	women		boys	girls
Doubles	men	women	mixed	boys	girls
WC Singles	men	women	quad	boys	girls
WC Doubles	men	women	quad	boys	girls

Qualification
Singles	men	women
- Australian Open

The 2025 Australian Open – Men's singles qualifying is a series of tennis matches that took place from 6 to 9 January 2025 to determine the sixteen qualifiers into the main draw of the men's singles tournament, and, if necessary, the lucky losers.

== Seeds ==
1. (Germany) Dominik Koepfer (qualified)
2. (Italy) Mattia Bellucci (second round)
3. (Hungary) Márton Fucsovics (second round)
4. (United States) Christopher Eubanks (qualifying competition)
5. (Italy) Francesco Passaro (qualifying competition, lucky loser)
6. (Brazil) Thiago Monteiro (qualified)
7. (United States) Aleksandar Kovacevic (second round)
8. (Netherlands) Jesper de Jong (first round)
9. (Kazakhstan) Mikhail Kukushkin (first round)
10. (Serbia) Laslo Djere (second round)
11. (France) Harold Mayot (first round)
12. (Argentina) Thiago Agustín Tirante (qualifying competition)
13. (Chinese Taipei) Tseng Chun-hsin (second round)
14. (Poland) Kamil Majchrzak (qualified)
15. (Belgium) Raphaël Collignon (first round)
16. (United States) Learner Tien (qualified)
17. (Portugal) Jaime Faria (qualified)
18. (Bolivia) Hugo Dellien (qualifying competition)
19. (United Kingdom) Billy Harris (qualifying competition)
20. (Colombia) Daniel Elahi Galán (first round)
21. (Slovakia) Jozef Kovalík (qualifying competition)
22. (France) Luca Van Assche (withdrew)
23. (France) Richard Gasquet (first round)
24. (Czech Republic) Vít Kopřiva (second round)
25. (United States) Mackenzie McDonald (qualifying competition)
26. (United States) Tristan Boyer (qualified)
27. (Switzerland) Jérôme Kym (second round)
28. (Slovakia) Lukáš Klein (qualified)
29. (Argentina) Federico Agustín Gómez (first round)
30. (Argentina) Juan Manuel Cerúndolo (first round)
31. (Monaco) Valentin Vacherot (second round)
32. (Italy) Matteo Gigante (qualified)

== Qualifiers ==
1. (Germany) Dominik Koepfer
2. (Slovakia) Lukáš Klein
3. (Italy) Matteo Gigante
4. (United States) Tristan Boyer
5. (Georgia (country)) Nikoloz Basilashvili
6. (Brazil) Thiago Monteiro
7. (Belgium) Gauthier Onclin
8. (Tunisia) Aziz Dougaz
9. (Portugal) Jaime Faria
10. (Chile) Cristian Garín
11. (United States) Mitchell Krueger
12. (Brazil) João Fonseca
13. (Lebanon) Hady Habib
14. (Poland) Kamil Majchrzak
15. (Spain) Martín Landaluce
16. (United States) Learner Tien

== Lucky loser ==
1. (Italy) Francesco Passaro

== Draw ==
=== First qualifier ===
First round
1	(Germany) Dominik Koepfer	2	6	7^{10}
(Peru) Ignacio Buse	6	3	6^{5}
(United States) Ethan Quinn	6	7
(France) Calvin Hemery	4	5
(France) Antoine Escoffier	2	1
WC	(Australia) Blake Ellis	6	6
PR	(Japan) Yosuke Watanuki	6	7^{7}
30	(Argentina) Juan Manuel Cerúndolo	3	6^{3}

Second round
1	(Germany) Dominik Koepfer	3	7	6
(United States) Ethan Quinn	6	5	1
WC	(Australia) Blake Ellis	6	6
PR	(Japan) Yosuke Watanuki	1	4

Qualifying competition
1	(Germany) Dominik Koepfer	7	7
WC	(Australia) Blake Ellis	5	5

=== Second qualifier ===
First round
2	(Italy) Mattia Bellucci	6	6
WC	(Australia) Pavle Marinkov	3	3
(France) Térence Atmane	4	6	6
WC	(Australia) Matthew Dellavedova	6	3	3
(Belgium) Alexander Blockx	6	1	5
(United States) Eliot Spizzirri	3	6	7
(Canada) Alexis Galarneau	4	6	5
28	(Slovakia) Lukáš Klein	6	3	7

Second round
2	(Italy) Mattia Bellucci	6^{7}	4
(France) Térence Atmane	7^{9}	6
(United States) Eliot Spizzirri	3	4
28	(Slovakia) Lukáš Klein	6	6

Qualifying competition
(France) Térence Atmane	4	1
28	(Slovakia) Lukáš Klein	6	6

=== Third qualifier ===
First round
3	(Hungary) Márton Fucsovics	6	6
(Spain) Oriol Roca Batalla	4	4
(Germany) Henri Squire	3	3
(Portugal) Henrique Rocha	6	6
(Austria) Lukas Neumayer	6^{5}	6	6
(Denmark) Elmer Møller	7^{7}	3	4
(Dominican Republic) Nick Hardt	2	2
32	(Italy) Matteo Gigante	6	6

Second round
3	(Hungary) Márton Fucsovics	2	6^{3}
(Portugal) Henrique Rocha	6	7^{7}
(Austria) Lukas Neumayer	3	4
32	(Italy) Matteo Gigante	6	6

Qualifying competition
(Portugal) Henrique Rocha	4	5
32	(Italy) Matteo Gigante	6	7

=== Fourth qualifier ===
First round
4	(United States) Christopher Eubanks	7^{7}	7
(France) Hugo Grenier	6^{1}	5
(Peru) Juan Pablo Varillas	7^{7}	6^{6}	4
(Spain) Alejandro Moro Cañas	6^{3}	7^{8}	6
(Chile) Tomás Barrios Vera	7^{7}	7^{7}
(United States) Emilio Nava	6^{0}	6^{3}
WC	(Japan) Rei Sakamoto	0	2
26	(United States) Tristan Boyer	6	6

Second round
4	(United States) Christopher Eubanks	6	6
(Spain) Alejandro Moro Cañas	3	3
(Chile) Tomás Barrios Vera	7	3	4
26	(United States) Tristan Boyer	5	6	6

Qualifying competition
4	(United States) Christopher Eubanks	4	4
26	(United States) Tristan Boyer	6	6

=== Fifth qualifier ===
First round
5	(Italy) Francesco Passaro	6	7^{7}
PR	(Italy) Giulio Zeppieri	3	6^{3}
(Spain) Javier Barranco Cosano	6	6
(Argentina) Facundo Mena	4	2
WC	(Australia) Cruz Hewitt	1	4
(Georgia (country)) Nikoloz Basilashvili	6	6
Alibek Kachmazov	6	7^{7}
Alt	(Japan) Shintaro Mochizuki	3	6^{1}

Second round
5	(Italy) Francesco Passaro	4	6	7^{10}
(Spain) Javier Barranco Cosano	6	3	6^{8}
(Georgia (country)) Nikoloz Basilashvili	7	6
Alibek Kachmazov	5	4

Qualifying competition
5	(Italy) Francesco Passaro	3	3
(Georgia (country)) Nikoloz Basilashvili	6	6

=== Sixth qualifier ===
First round
6	(Brazil) Thiago Monteiro	7^{7}	7^{7}
PR	(Australia) Jason Kubler	6^{4}	6^{4}
(France) Valentin Royer	6	6
WC	(Australia) Marc Polmans	3	0
PR	(Belgium) Kimmer Coppejans	2	7^{7}	6
(France) Matteo Martineau	6	6^{5}	1
(Switzerland) Marc-Andrea Hüsler	3	4
31	(Monaco) Valentin Vacherot	6	6

Second round
6	(Brazil) Thiago Monteiro	7^{7}	6
(France) Valentin Royer	6^{1}	3
PR	(Belgium) Kimmer Coppejans	6	7^{7}
31	(Monaco) Valentin Vacherot	4	6^{3}

Qualifying competition
6	(Brazil) Thiago Monteiro	6	6
PR	(Belgium) Kimmer Coppejans	4	3

=== Seventh qualifier ===
First round
7	(United States) Aleksandar Kovacevic	7^{7}	6
(Argentina) Andrea Collarini	6^{5}	4
(Argentina) Román Andrés Burruchaga	6	0	6^{7}
(Belgium) Gauthier Onclin	1	6	7^{10}
(United States) Brandon Holt	7^{8}	6
(Italy) Gianluca Mager	6^{6}	2
(Australia) Alex Bolt	2	2
25	(United States) Mackenzie McDonald	6	6

Second round
7	(United States) Aleksandar Kovacevic	6	6^{5}	1
(Belgium) Gauthier Onclin	3	7^{7}	6
(United States) Brandon Holt	4	4
25	(United States) Mackenzie McDonald	6	6

Qualifying competition
(Belgium) Gauthier Onclin	6^{7}	7^{7}	6
25	(United States) Mackenzie McDonald	7^{9}	6^{3}	1

=== Eighth qualifier ===
First round
8	(Netherlands) Jesper de Jong	7^{7}	1	6^{5}
(Tunisia) Aziz Dougaz	6^{5}	6	7^{10}
(Colombia) Nicolás Mejía	4	7	4
(Lebanon) Benjamin Hassan	6	5	6
PR	(Croatia) Borna Gojo	6	6
(Kazakhstan) Timofey Skatov	3	4
(France) Constant Lestienne	3	1^{r}
24	(Czech Republic) Vít Kopřiva	6	4

Second round
(Tunisia) Aziz Dougaz	3	7^{7}	6
(Lebanon) Benjamin Hassan	6	6^{5}	4
PR	(Croatia) Borna Gojo	2	6	6
24	(Czech Republic) Vít Kopřiva	6	3	2

Qualifying competition
(Tunisia) Aziz Dougaz	6	3	6
PR	(Croatia) Borna Gojo	4	6	1

=== Ninth qualifier ===
First round
9	(Kazakhstan) Mikhail Kukushkin	0	2
(Estonia) Mark Lajal	6	6
(Moldova) Radu Albot	2	3
(Japan) Sho Shimabukuro	6	6
(France) Pierre-Hugues Herbert	6^{4}	2
WC	(Australia) Dane Sweeny	7^{7}	6
(Netherlands) Gijs Brouwer	4	3
17	(Portugal) Jaime Faria	6	6

Second round
(Estonia) Mark Lajal	2	7^{8}	6
(Japan) Sho Shimabukuro	6	6^{6}	4
WC	(Australia) Dane Sweeny	2	2
17	(Portugal) Jaime Faria	6	6

Qualifying competition
(Estonia) Mark Lajal	4	6	4
17	(Portugal) Jaime Faria	6	2	6

=== Tenth qualifier ===
First round
10	(Serbia) Laslo Djere	6	6
(Brazil) Gustavo Heide	3	1
(Chile) Cristian Garín	6	6
(Bolivia) Murkel Dellien	3	1
(Lithuania) Vilius Gaubas	7^{9}	6^{2}	2
(Poland) Maks Kaśnikowski	6^{7}	7^{7}	6
(Germany) Maximilian Marterer	3	3
18	(Bolivia) Hugo Dellien	6	6

Second round
10	(Serbia) Laslo Djere	4	6	5
(Chile) Cristian Garín	6	1	7
(Poland) Maks Kaśnikowski	6	5	2
18	(Bolivia) Hugo Dellien	3	7	6

Qualifying competition
(Chile) Cristian Garín	6	6
18	(Bolivia) Hugo Dellien	2	3

=== Eleventh qualifier ===
First round
11	(France) Harold Mayot	4	6^{5}
(Japan) Yasutaka Uchiyama	6	7^{7}
(Bulgaria) Adrian Andreev	4	4
(Paraguay) Daniel Vallejo	6	6
(United States) Mitchell Krueger	6	6
(Romania) Filip Cristian Jianu	3	4
(Croatia) Duje Ajduković	7^{7}	6
23	(France) Richard Gasquet	6^{4}	3

Second round
(Japan) Yasutaka Uchiyama	4	6	6
(Paraguay) Daniel Vallejo	6	3	4
(United States) Mitchell Krueger	6	6
(Croatia) Duje Ajduković	4	3

Qualifying competition
(Japan) Yasutaka Uchiyama	3	7^{7}	4
(United States) Mitchell Krueger	6	6^{5}	6

=== Twelfth qualifier ===
First round
12	(Argentina) Thiago Agustín Tirante	7^{7}	4	6
(Austria) Jurij Rodionov	6^{5}	6	4
(France) Titouan Droguet	6	7
(United Kingdom) Jan Choinski	4	5
(Hong Kong) Coleman Wong	7	3	7
(Kazakhstan) Dmitry Popko	5	6	5
(Brazil) João Fonseca	6	6
29	(Argentina) Federico Agustín Gómez	4	0

Second round
12	(Argentina) Thiago Agustín Tirante	6	7^{7}
(France) Titouan Droguet	4	6^{4}
(Hong Kong) Coleman Wong	0	3
(Brazil) João Fonseca	6	6

Qualifying competition
12	(Argentina) Thiago Agustín Tirante	4	1
(Brazil) João Fonseca	6	6

=== Thirteenth qualifier ===
First round
13	(Chinese Taipei) Tseng Chun-hsin	6	6
(Italy) Federico Arnaboldi	2	4
(Lebanon) Hady Habib	6	7^{8}
(United States) Patrick Kypson	4	6^{6}
(Brazil) Felipe Meligeni Alves	6	1	0^{r}
(France) Clément Chidekh	4	6	0
PR	(Netherlands) Tim van Rijthoven	0	3
27	(Switzerland) Jérôme Kym	6	6

Second round
13	(Chinese Taipei) Tseng Chun-hsin	4	6^{2}
(Lebanon) Hady Habib	6	7^{7}
(France) Clément Chidekh	6^{0}	6	6
27	(Switzerland) Jérôme Kym	7^{7}	3	2

Qualifying competition
(Lebanon) Hady Habib	6	3	7^{10}
(France) Clément Chidekh	4	6	6^{8}

=== Fourteenth qualifier ===
First round
14	(Poland) Kamil Majchrzak	3	7^{7}	6
(Argentina) Marco Trungelliti	6	6^{4}	3
(United States) Zachary Svajda	6	6
(France) Enzo Couacaud	3	2
WC	(Australia) Edward Winter	4	5
(Spain) Carlos Taberner	6	7
(Japan) Yuta Shimizu	7^{7}	4	4
19	(United Kingdom) Billy Harris	6^{4}	6	6

Second round
14	(Poland) Kamil Majchrzak	6^{5}	6	6
(United States) Zachary Svajda	7^{7}	1	2
(Spain) Carlos Taberner	1	2
19	(United Kingdom) Billy Harris	6	6

Qualifying competition
14	(Poland) Kamil Majchrzak	7	6
19	(United Kingdom) Billy Harris	5	2

=== Fifteenth qualifier ===
First round
15	(Belgium) Raphaël Collignon	3	3
(Spain) Martín Landaluce	6	6
(Japan) James Trotter	6	3	6
(United Kingdom) Dan Evans	4	6	3
(France) Ugo Blanchet	6	2	3
(Czech Republic) Dalibor Svrčina	3	6	6
(Uzbekistan) Khumoyun Sultanov	6	6^{2}	7
20	(Colombia) Daniel Elahi Galán	3	7^{7}	5

Second round
(Spain) Martín Landaluce	6	7
(Japan) James Trotter	4	5
(Czech Republic) Dalibor Svrčina	6	1	6
(Uzbekistan) Khumoyun Sultanov	3	6	3

Qualifying competition
(Spain) Martín Landaluce	2	6	7
(Czech Republic) Dalibor Svrčina	6	1	5

=== Sixteenth qualifier ===
First round
16	(United States) Learner Tien	4	7^{7}	6
(France) Grégoire Barrère	6	6^{4}	1
(Argentina) Juan Pablo Ficovich	6	6
(United Kingdom) Paul Jubb	4	4
WC	(Australia) Hayden Jones	6^{8}	6	6^{8}
(Denmark) August Holmgren	7^{10}	4	7^{10}
(Australia) Bernard Tomic	3	1
21	(Slovakia) Jozef Kovalík	6	6

Second round
16	(United States) Learner Tien	6	6
(Argentina) Juan Pablo Ficovich	4	2
(Denmark) August Holmgren	7^{7}	3	5
21	(Slovakia) Jozef Kovalík	6^{3}	6	7

Qualifying competition
16	(United States) Learner Tien	6	6
21	(Slovakia) Jozef Kovalík	3	4
