= 2026 Brasília Tennis Open =

- Date: 2 – 8 March
- Edition: 1st
- Surface: Clay
- Location: Brasília, Brazil

Champions

Singles
- (Portugal) Henrique Rocha

Doubles
- (Portugal) Jaime Faria / (Portugal) Henrique Rocha
- Brasília Tennis Open

The 2026 Brasília Tennis Open was a professional tennis tournament played on clay courts. It was the first edition of the tournament which was part of the 2026 ATP Challenger Tour. It took place in Brasília, Brazil between 2 and 8 March 2026.

== Singles main-draw entrants ==
=== Seeds ===
Country	Player	Rank^{1}	Seed
PAR	Daniel Vallejo	106	1
DEN	Elmer Møller	127	2
POR	Jaime Faria	145	3
NED	Guy den Ouden	151	4
POR	Henrique Rocha	172	5
ARG	Juan Pablo Ficovich	178	6
COL	Daniel Elahi Galán	188	7
ECU	Álvaro Guillén Meza	205	8

- ^{1} Rankings are as of 23 February 2026.

=== Other entrants ===
The following players received wildcards into the singles main draw:

- (Brazil) Igor Marcondes
- (Brazil) Guto Miguel
- (Colombia) Miguel Tobón

The following player received entry into the singles main draw as a special exempt:

- (Argentina) Facundo Díaz Acosta

The following player received entry into the singles main draw as an alternate:

- (Brazil) Daniel Dutra da Silva

The following players received entry from the qualifying draw:

- (Brazil) Eduardo Ribeiro
- (Uruguay) Franco Roncadelli
- (Brazil) Pedro Sakamoto
- (Spain) Carlos Sánchez Jover
- (Brazil) João Eduardo Schiessl
- (Chile) Benjamín Torrealba

== Champions ==
=== Singles ===
- (Portugal) Henrique Rocha def. (Paraguay) Daniel Vallejo 6–4, 6–4.

=== Doubles ===
- (Portugal) Jaime Faria / (Portugal) Henrique Rocha def. (Argentina) Mariano Kestelboim / (Brazil) Marcelo Zormann 6–3, 6–2.
