= Adolfo Daniel Vallejo =

Paraguayan tennis player (born 2004)

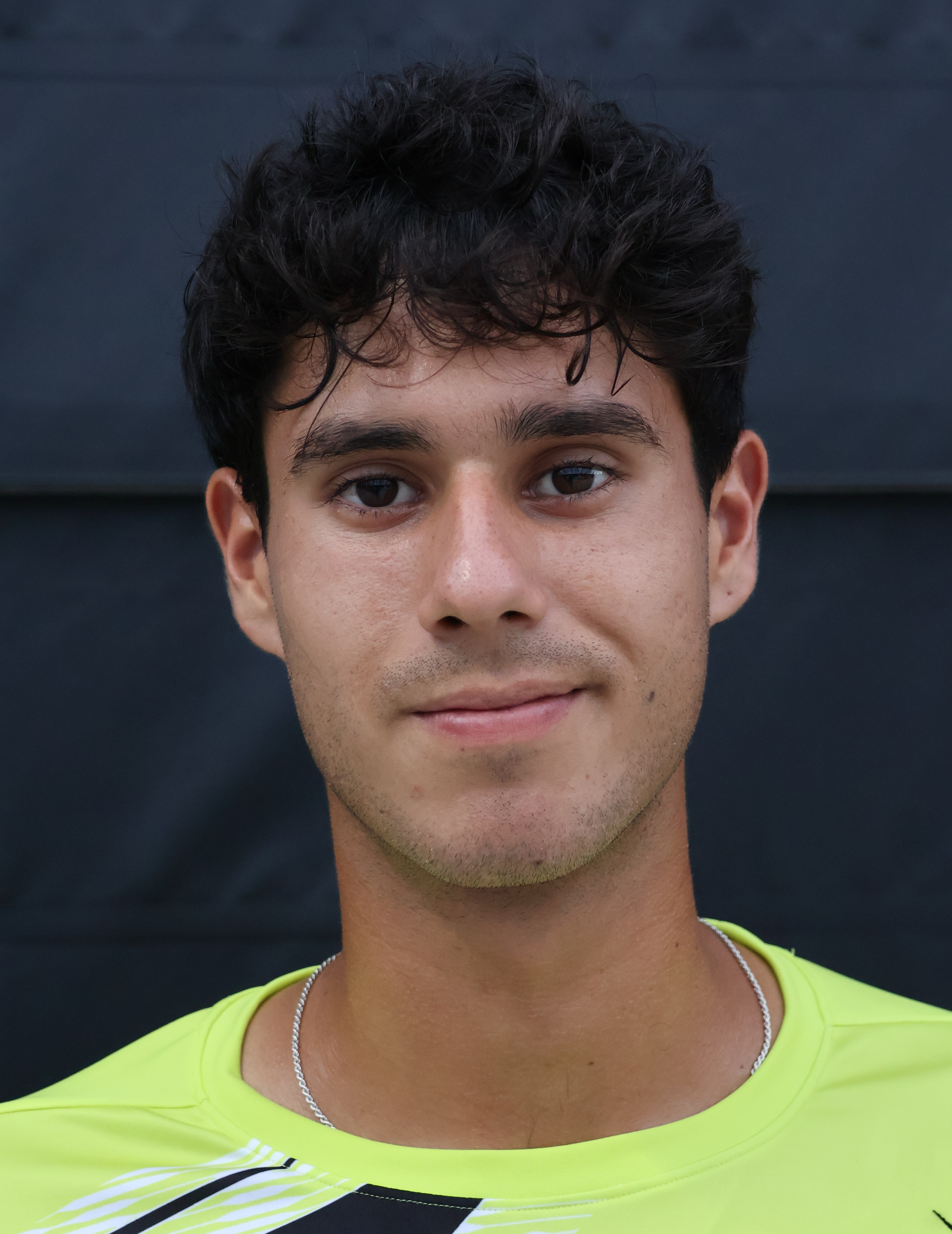
- Vallejo in 2023
- Full name: Adolfo Daniel Vallejo Álvarez
- Country (sports): Paraguay
- Born: 28 April 2004 (age 22) Asunción, Paraguay
- Height: 1.85 m (6 ft 1 in)
- Turned pro: 2023
- Plays: Right-handed (two-handed backhand)
- Coach: Andrés Schneiter
- Prize money: US $1,191,550

Singles
- Career record: 25–20 (at ATP Tour level, Grand Slam level, and in Davis Cup)
- Career titles: 0; 5 Challenger
- Highest ranking: No. 52 (5 October 2026)
- Current ranking: No. 56 (9 November 2026)

Grand Slam singles results
- Australian Open: Q3 (2026)
- French Open: 2R (2026)
- Wimbledon: 1R (2026)
- US Open: 1R (2026)

Doubles
- Career record: 5–5 (at ATP Tour level, Grand Slam level, and in Davis Cup)
- Career titles: 0; 1 Challenger
- Highest ranking: No. 435 (21 April 2025)
- Current ranking: No. 534 (19 October 2026)

Grand Slam doubles results
- Wimbledon: 1R (2026)

Team competitions
- Davis Cup: 2–1
Medal record
South American Games
Gold medal – first place	2022 Asunción	Mixed doubles
Junior Pan American Games
Bronze medal – third place	2021 Cali-Valle	Boys' doubles
- Last updated on: 19 October 2026.

Adolfo Daniel Vallejo Álvarez (born 28 April 2004) is a Paraguayan professional tennis player. He has a career-high ATP singles ranking of world No. 52 achieved on 5 October 2026 and a doubles ranking of No. 435 achieved on 21 April 2025. He is currently the No. 1 singles player from Paraguay.

He reached an ITF junior combined ranking of world No. 1 on 15 August 2022.

Vallejo represents Paraguay at the Davis Cup, where he has a win–loss record of 5–3.

== Career ==
=== 2021-2022: Juniors ===
In 2021, Vallejo won the prestigious Orange Bowl in Plantation, United States, defeating American Bruno Kuzuhara in the final. He was the first Paraguayan player to win that event and only the second to reach the final after Víctor Pecci.

In January 2022, he was a runner-up in the boys' doubles category at the 2022 Australian Open, with American Alex Michelsen. The pair lost to second seeds Bruno Kuzuhara and Coleman Wong in the final.

=== 2023-2024: Maiden ATP Challenger title ===
In July 2023, Vallejo reached his first final on the Challenger Tour in Santa Fe, Argentina, losing to Mariano Navone in the final. The following month, he won his first Challenger doubles title in Lima, Peru, partnering with Gonzalo Bueno, defeating Jorge Panta and Ignacio Buse in the final.

In March 2024, Vallejo won his first Challenger title in São Léopoldo, Brazil, defeating Enzo Couacaud in the final. He became the youngest Paraguayan to win an ATP Challenger title and the fourth Paraguayan champion in ATP Challenger Tour history and first since Ramon Delgado in 2009. As a result, he reached the top 300 on 6 May 2024.

=== 2025: Two Challenger titles, top 150 ===
In March 2025 ranked at a career-high of No. 187, achieved on 17 March 2025, Vallejo reached the semifinals at the home Challenger in Asunción, Paraguay but lost to eventual champion Emilio Nava. Following winning the 2025 Guayaquil Challenger, Vallejo reached the top 150 in the singles rankings at world No. 143 on 24 November 2025.

=== 2026: Top 100, Grand Slam debut and first win, ATP 500 debut, tour-level semifinal ===
Vallejo began his year by winning two consecutive Challenger titles in Itajaí and Concepción. He reached a third final in the South American clay court swing in Brasília, but lost to Henrique Rocha.

Following a first round win at Houston, Vallejo made his debut in the world's top 100, becoming only the fourth Paraguayan player ever to do so, and the first since Ramón Delgado. In Madrid, Vallejo qualified to make his Masters 1000 debut, then defeated Grigor Dimitrov, becoming the second Paraguayan player after Delgado to win a match at Masters 1000 level, and 17th seed Learner Tien to advance to the third round, where he lost to Flavio Cobolli in straight sets. After this, he advanced to his fourth challenger tour final of the year in Valencia, losing to Miomir Kecmanović in 3 sets. At the French Open, Vallejo advanced to the second round after 20th seed Cameron Norrie was forced to retire midway through their match. He lost in the second round to Moïse Kouamé.

During an interview following the loss to Kouamé, Vallejo made controversial sexist remarks about chair umpire Ana Carvalho, arguing that female umpires and officials are unfit to umpire matches like his and Kouamé's due to the demanding crowd. He was quoted saying "This sort of match needs to be umpired by a man; it’s very difficult for a woman to do it". The French Open organizers released an official statement condemning Vallejo's actions, and he was subsequently fined €65,000 (equivalent to roughly US$75,000) for his remarks, the largest fine in Roland Garros history.

Vallejo made his first ATP Tour-level semifinal in Båstad. He made his debut inside the top 60 after a first round win in Winston-Salem.

Making his ATP 500 main-draw debut as a qualifier at the Japan Open, Vallejo defeated Rafael Jódar and Matteo Berrettini to reach the quarterfinals. He became the first Paraguayan to reach that stage at an ATP 500 event since the category was introduced in 2009. He lost to Jiří Lehečka in straight sets.

== Performance timeline ==
Key
W	F	SF	QF	#R	RR	Q#	DNQ	A	NH

(W) winner; (F) finalist; (SF) semifinalist; (QF) quarterfinalist; (#R) rounds 4, 3, 2, 1; (RR) round-robin stage; (Q#) qualification round; (DNQ) did not qualify; (A) absent; (NH) not held; (SR) strike rate (events won / competed); (W–L) win–loss record.

== Performance timeline ==
Key
W	F	SF	QF	#R	RR	Q#	DNQ	A	NH

(W) winner; (F) finalist; (SF) semifinalist; (QF) quarterfinalist; (#R) rounds 4, 3, 2, 1; (RR) round-robin stage; (Q#) qualification round; (DNQ) did not qualify; (A) absent; (NH) not held; (SR) strike rate (events won / competed); (W–L) win–loss record.
To avoid confusion and double counting, these charts are updated at the conclusion of a tournament or when the player's participation has ended.

=== Singles ===
Tournament	2025	2026	SR	W–L	Win %
Grand Slam tournaments
Australian Open	Q2	Q3	0 / 0	0–0	–
French Open	A	2R	0 / 1	1–1	50%
Wimbledon	A	1R	0 / 1	0–1	0%
US Open	A	1R	0 / 1	0–1	0%
Win–loss	0–0	0–3	0 / 3	1–3	25%
ATP Masters 1000
Indian Wells Masters	A	A	0 / 0	0–0	–
Miami Open	A	A	0 / 0	0–0	–
Monte Carlo Masters	A	A	0 / 0	0–0	–
Madrid Open	A	3R	0 / 1	2-1	67%
Italian Open	A	Q1	0 / 0	0–0	–
Canadian Open	A	1R	0 / 1	0–1	0%
Cincinnati Masters	A	3R	0 / 1	2–1	67%
Shanghai Masters	A	2R	0 / 1	1–1	50%
Paris Masters	A	1R	0 / 1	0–1	0%
Win–loss	0–0	5–5	0 / 5	5–5	50%

== ATP Challenger Tour finals ==
=== Singles: 11 (5 titles, 6 runner-ups) ===
Finals by surface
Hard (–)
Clay (5–6)

Result	W–L	Date	Tournament	Tier	Surface	Opponent	Score
Loss	0–1	Jul 2023	Challenger Santa Fe, Argentina	Challenger	Clay	(Argentina) Mariano Navone	2–6, 4–6
Win	1–1	Mar 2024	São Léo Open, Brazil	Challenger	Clay	(France) Enzo Couacaud	6–3, 6–2
Loss	1–2	Sep 2024	Antofagasta Challenger, Chile	Challenger	Clay	(Argentina) Juan Manuel Cerúndolo	6–3, 2–6, 4–6
Loss	1–3	Jan 2025	Challenger de Tigre, Argentina	Challenger	Clay	(Peru) Juan Pablo Varillas	4–6, 4–6
Win	2–3	Oct 2025	Curitiba Challenger, Brazil	Challenger	Clay	(Brazil) Pedro Boscardin Dias	6–3, 7–5
Loss	2–4	Oct 2025	Costa do Sauípe Open, Brazil	Challenger	Clay	(Argentina) Román Andrés Burruchaga	1–6, 2–6
Win	3–4	Nov 2025	Challenger de Guayaquil, Ecuador	Challenger	Clay	(Peru) Juan Pablo Varillas	7–5, 6–7^{(7–9)}, 6–3
Win	4–4	Jan 2026	Itajaí Open, Brazil	Challenger	Clay	(Brazil) Thiago Seyboth Wild	7–5, 4–6, 6–2
Win	5–4	Jan 2026	Challenger Concepción, Chile	Challenger	Clay	(Chile) Alejandro Tabilo	6–2, 1–6, 6–1
Loss	5–5	Mar 2026	Brasília Tennis Open, Brazil	Challenger	Clay	(Portugal) Henrique Rocha	4–6, 4–6
Loss	5–6	May 2026	Copa Faulconbridge, Spain	Challenger	Clay	(Serbia) Miomir Kecmanović	2–6, 6–3, 2–6

=== Doubles: 1 (title) ===
Result	W–L	Date	Tournament	Tier	Surface	Partner	Opponents	Score
Win	1–0	Aug 2023	Lima Challenger, Peru	Challenger	Clay	(Peru) Gonzalo Bueno	(Peru) Jorge Panta (Peru) Ignacio Buse	6–4, 6–2

== ITF World Tennis Tour finals ==
=== Singles: 6 (4 titles, 2 runner-ups) ===
Finals by surface
Hard (1–1)
Clay (3–1)

Result	W–L	Date	Tournament	Tier	Surface	Opponent	Score
Loss	0–1	Nov 2022	M15 Madrid, Spain	WTT	Hard	(Spain) David Jordà Sanchis	3–6, 1–6
Loss	0–2	Jul 2023	M25 Rosario, Argentina	WTT	Clay	(Argentina) Juan Ignacio Londero	3–6, 2–6
Win	1–2	Aug 2024	M25 Idanha-a-Nova, Portugal	WTT	Hard	(United Kingdom) Alastair Gray	6–2, 6–3
Win	2–2	Feb 2025	M25 Punta del Este, Uruguay	WTT	Clay	(Argentina) Luciano Emanuel Ambrogi	6–1, 6–4
Win	3–2	Sep 2025	M25 Mar del Plata, Argentina	WTT	Clay	(Argentina) Lautaro Midón	7–6^{(7–4)}, 6–3
Win	4–2	Sep 2025	M25 Londrina, Brazil	WTT	Clay	(Brazil) Gustavo Heide	6–4, 4–6, 6–3

=== Doubles: 7 (5 titles, 2 runner-ups) ===
Finals by surface
Hard (4–1)
Clay (1–1)

Result	W–L	Date	Tournament	Tier	Surface	Partner	Opponents	Score
Win	1–0	Jul 2022	M15 Los Angeles, US	WTT	Hard	(United States) Ethan Quinn	(United States) Aidan Mayo (United States) Keenan Mayo	7–5, 6–4
Win	2–0	Jul 2022	M15 Fountain Valley, US	WTT	Hard	(United States) Ethan Quinn	(Ghana) Abraham Asaba (United States) Sekou Bangoura	6–0, 3–6, [10–8]
Loss	2–1	Dec 2022	M25 Trnava, Slovakia	WTT	Hard (i)	(Spain) Daniel Rincón	(Netherlands) Mats Hermans (Netherlands) Mick Veldheer	6–1, 3–6, [8–10]
Win	3–1	Dec 2022	M15 Trnava, Slovakia	WTT	Hard (i)	(Spain) Daniel Rincón	(Jordan) Abedallah Shelbayh (Hong Kong) Coleman Wong	6–4, 6–2
Win	4–1	Jan 2023	M15 Manacor, Spain	WTT	Hard	(Spain) Daniel Rincón	Svyatoslav Gulin (Moldova) Ilya Snițari	6–4, 7–6^{(7–5)}
Loss	4–2	Feb 2023	M15 Antalya, Turkey	WTT	Clay	(Brazil) Igor Gimenez	(Italy) Matteo De Vincentis (France) Arthur Reymond	6–7^{(5–7)}, 4–6
Win	5–2	May 2024	M25 Carnac, France	WTT	Clay	(Argentina) Federico Agustín Gómez	(Germany) Christoph Negritu (Peru) Alexander Merino	6–3, 7–5

== Junior Grand Slam finals ==
=== Doubles: 1 (runner-up) ===
Result	Year	Tournament	Surface	Partner	Opponents	Score
Loss	2022	Australian Open	Hard	(United States) Alex Michelsen	(United States) Bruno Kuzuhara (Hong Kong) Coleman Wong	3–6, 6–7^{(3–7)}
