= Henrique Rocha =

Portuguese tennis player (born 2004)

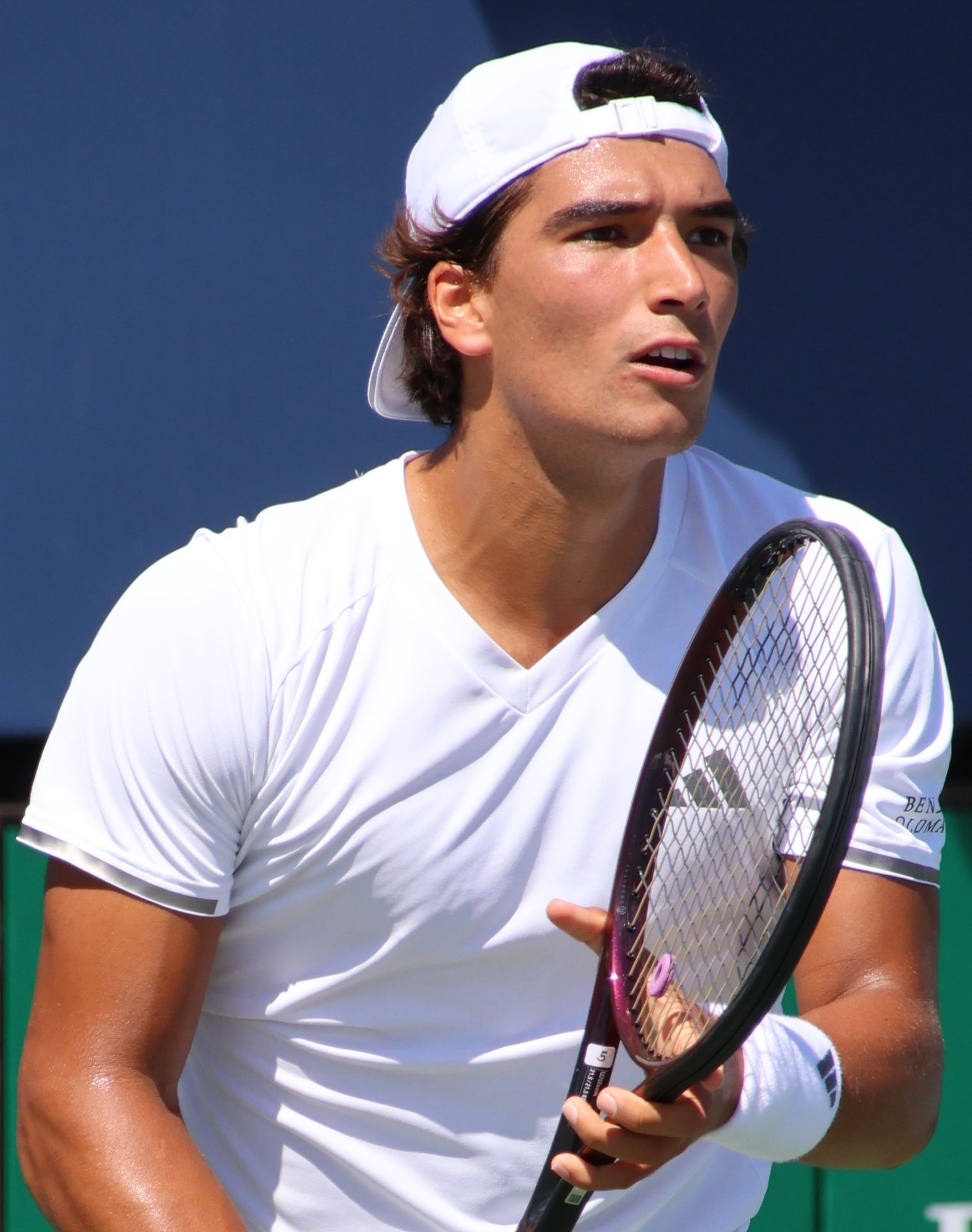
- Rocha at the 2026 US Open
- Country (sports): Portugal
- Born: 6 April 2004 (age 22) Porto, Portugal
- Height: 1.80 m (5 ft 11 in)
- Plays: Right handed, two-handed backhand
- Coach: André Lopes, Pedro Sousa
- Prize money: US $1,103,123

Singles
- Career record: 7–7
- Career titles: 0
- Highest ranking: No. 99 (2 November 2026)
- Current ranking: No. 99 (2 November 2026)

Grand Slam singles results
- Australian Open: Q3 (2025)
- French Open: 3R (2025)
- Wimbledon: Q2 (2024, 2025)
- US Open: Q3 (2025)

Doubles
- Career record: 1–3
- Career titles: 0
- Highest ranking: No. 166 (9 September 2024)
- Current ranking: No. 450 (2 November 2026)
- Last updated on: 2 November 2026.

Henrique Rocha (born 6 April 2004) is a Portuguese professional tennis player. He has a career-high ATP singles ranking of world No. 99 achieved on 2 November 2026 and a doubles ranking of No. 166 achieved on 9 September 2024. He is currently the No. 3 singles player from Portugal.

== Early career ==
Rocha is from Maia. In 2018, he was training at the Centro de Alto Rendimento do Jamor, in Cruz Quebrada. When he was 15 years-old he began training in Lisbon, at the Portuguese Tennis Federation. He won Portuguese under-14, and under-16 age-group titles.

In July 2020, he became the first tennis player born in 2004 to beat a player ranked in the world top 600 when he defeated world No. 547 Tiago Cação in Figueira da Foz.

== Career ==
In 2023, Rocha made his ATP main draw debut after qualifying at the 2023 Estoril Open. He defeated higher ranked players Ryan Peniston, and Máté Valkusz to reach the main draw. It was his first ATP tour qualifying event, having never previously even qualified for a Challenger tournament in 12 attempts. That year, Rocha began being coached by Portuguese former ATP player Pedro Sousa.

Rocha won his maiden Challenger title at the 2024 Murcia Open defeating Nikoloz Basilashvili in the final. He became the fifth player born in 2004 to accomplish the milestone after Luca Van Assche, Arthur Fils, Alex Michelsen and Gonzalo Bueno. As a result he moved more than 50 positions up in the rankings reaching the top 200 at world No. 197 on 1 April 2024. He also received a wildcard for the main draw at the 2024 Estoril Open.

Ranked No. 195, Rocha made his Grand Slam main draw debut at the 2025 French Open as a qualifier and recorded his first major win over fellow qualifier Nikoloz Basilashvili in five sets. He became only the fifth Portuguese man to win a singles match at Roland Garros. Rocha reached a major third round for the first time in his career with an upset over 19th seed Jakub Menšík in five sets.

Having entered qualifying for the 2026 Australian Open, he defeated João Lucas Reis da Silva, before losing to Argentine Marco Trungelliti in the second qualification round.

== Performance timeline ==
Key
W	F	SF	QF	#R	RR	Q#	DNQ	A	NH

(W) winner; (F) finalist; (SF) semifinalist; (QF) quarterfinalist; (#R) rounds 4, 3, 2, 1; (RR) round-robin stage; (Q#) qualification round; (DNQ) did not qualify; (A) absent; (NH) not held; (SR) strike rate (events won / competed); (W–L) win–loss record.
To avoid confusion and double counting, these charts are updated at the conclusion of a tournament or when the player's participation has ended.

=== Singles ===
Tournament	2024	2025	2026	SR	W–L	Win %
Grand Slam tournaments
Australian Open	A	Q3	Q2	0 / 0	0–0	–
French Open	Q1	3R	Q2	0 / 1	2–1	67%
Wimbledon	Q2	Q2		0 / 0	0–0	–
US Open	Q1	Q3		0 / 0	0–0	–
Win–loss	0–0	2–1	0–0	0 / 1	2–1	67%
ATP Masters 1000
Indian Wells Masters	A	A		0 / 0	0–0	–
Miami Open	A	A		0 / 0	0–0	–
Monte Carlo Masters	A	A		0 / 0	0–0	–
Madrid Open	A	A		0 / 0	0-0	–
Italian Open	A	A		0 / 0	0–0	–
Canadian Open	A	A		0 / 0	0–0	–
Cincinnati Masters	A	A		0 / 0	0–0	–
Shanghai Masters	A	A		0 / 0	0–0	–
Paris Masters	A	A		0 / 0	0–0	–
Win–loss	0–0	0–0	0–0	0 / 0	0–0	–

== ATP Challenger Tour finals ==
=== Singles: 8 (5 titles, 3 runner-ups) ===
Legend ATP Challenger Tour (5–3)	Finals by surface Hard (2–0) Clay (3–3)

Result	W–L	Date	Tournament	Tier	Surface	Opponent	Score
Win	1–0	Mar 2024	Murcia Open, Spain	Challenger	Clay	(Georgia (country)) Nikoloz Basilashvili	3–6, 7–6^{(7–0)}, 7–5
Loss	1–1	Jun 2024	Bratislava Open, Slovakia	Challenger	Clay	(Poland) Kamil Majchrzak	0–6, 6–2, 3–6
Loss	1–2	Sep 2025	Lisboa Belém Open, Portugal	Challenger	Clay	(Lithuania) Vilius Gaubas	7–6^{(7–3)}, 3–6, 4–6
Win	2–2	Nov 2025	Matsuyama Challenger, Japan	Challenger	Hard	(Japan) Sho Shimabukuro	7–5, 3–6, 6–2
Win	3–2	Mar 2026	Brasília Tennis Open, Brazil	Challenger	Clay	(Paraguay) Daniel Vallejo	6–4, 6–4
Loss	3–3	Mar 2026	Challenger de Santiago, Chile	Challenger	Clay	(Argentina) Genaro Alberto Olivieri	4–6, 4–6
Win	4–3	Jun 2026	Internazionali Città di Perugia, Italy	Challenger	Clay	(Spain) Daniel Mérida	7–6^{(7–5)}, 6–3
Win	5–3	Sep 2026	Porto Open, Portugal	Challenger	Hard	(Spain) Iñaki Montes de la Torre	2–6, 6–4, 6–4

=== Doubles: 6 (3 titles, 3 runner-ups) ===
Legend ATP Challenger Tour (3–3)	Finals by surface Hard (1–0) Clay (2–3)

Result	W–L	Date	Tournament	Tier	Surface	Partner	Opponents	Score
Loss	0–1	May 2023	Open de Oeiras II, Portugal	Challenger	Clay	(Portugal) Jaime Faria	(United Kingdom) Luke Johnson (Netherlands) Sem Verbeek	7–6^{(8–6)}, 5–7, [6–10]
Loss	0–2	Oct 2023	Lisboa Belém Open, Portugal	Challenger	Clay	(Portugal) Jaime Faria	(Poland) Karol Drzewiecki (Czech Republic) Zdeněk Kolář	3–6, 6–7^{(5–7)}
Win	1–2	Apr 2024	Ostra Group Open, Czech Republic	Challenger	Clay	(Portugal) Jaime Faria	(Germany) Jakob Schnaitter (Germany) Mark Wallner	7–5, 6–3
Loss	1–3	Jun 2024	Zagreb Open, Croatia	Challenger	Clay	(Romania) Mircea-Alexandru Jecan	(France) Jonathan Eysseric (France) Quentin Halys	4–6, 4–6
Win	2–3	Sep 2024	Cassis Open, France	Challenger	Hard	(Portugal) Jaime Faria	(France) Manuel Guinard (France) Matteo Martineau	7–6^{(7–5)}, 6–4
Win	3–3	Mar 2026	Brasília Tennis Open, Brasil	Challenger	Clay	(Portugal) Jaime Faria	(Argentina) Mariano Kestelboim (Brazil) Marcelo Zormann	6–3, 6–2

== ITF World Tennis Tour finals ==
=== Singles: 7 (6 titles, 1 runner-up) ===
Legend ITF WTT (6–1)	Finals by surface Hard (5–1) Clay (1–0)

Result	W–L	Date	Tournament	Tier	Surface	Opponent	Score
Win	1–0	Feb 2023	M25 Vila Real de Santo António, Portugal	WTT	Hard	(Italy) Federico Gaio	6–3, 6–1
Win	2–0	Jun 2023	M25 Mungia, Spain	WTT	Clay (i)	(Spain) Pedro Vives Marcos	6–3, 6–4
Win	3–0	Jul 2023	M25 Bakio, Spain	WTT	Hard	(France) Lucas Poullain	6–2, 6–2
Win	4–0	Sep 2023	M25 Sintra, Portugal	WTT	Hard	(Germany) Sebastian Fanselow	6–3, 6–2
Win	5–0	Oct 2023	M25 Tavira, Portugal	WTT	Hard	(France) Valentin Royer	6–4, 6–4
Loss	5–1	Oct 2023	M25 Tavira, Portugal	WTT	Hard	(Germany) Sebastian Fanselow	2–6, 3–6
Win	6–1	Nov 2023	M25 Vale do Lobo, Portugal	WTT	Hard	(Czech Republic) Hynek Bartoň	6–3, 6–1

=== Doubles: 8 (4 titles, 4 runner-ups) ===
Legend ITF WTT (4–4)	Finals by surface Hard (4–2) Clay (0–2)

Result	W–L	Date	Tournament	Tier	Surface	Partner	Opponents	Score
Loss	0–1	Apr 2023	M25 Santa Margherita di Pula, Italy	WTT	Clay	(Portugal) Jaime Faria	(Germany) Kai Wenhelt (Netherlands) Mick Veldheer	6–3, 1–6, [12–14]
Loss	0–2	Sep 2023	M25 Mataró, Spain	WTT	Clay	(Portugal) Jaime Faria	(Switzerland) Rémy Bertola (Italy) Gianmarco Ferrari	6–7^{(4–7)}, 6–2, [9–11]
Win	1–2	Jun 2023	M25 Martos, Spain	WTT	Hard	(Portugal) Jaime Faria	(India) Parikshit Somani (India) Ramkumar Ramanathan	6–3, 7–6^{(7–3)}
Loss	1–3	Sep 2023	M25 Sintra, Portugal	WTT	Hard	(Portugal) Jaime Faria	(Denmark) Johannes Ingildsen (Sweden) Fred Simonsson	6–7^{(5–7)}, 6–3, [7–10]
Loss	1–4	Sep 2023	M25 Sintra, Portugal	WTT	Hard	(Portugal) Jaime Faria	(United States) Dali Blanch (United States) Martin Damm Jr.	1–6, 2–6
Win	2–4	Oct 2023	M25 Setúbal, Portugal	WTT	Hard	(Portugal) Jaime Faria	(Portugal) Diogo Marques (Portugal) Fred Gil	6–3, 6–3
Win	3–4	Oct 2023	M25 Tavira, Portugal	WTT	Hard	(Portugal) Jaime Faria	(Ukraine) Aleksandr Braynin (Austria) David Pichler	6–3, 6–1
Win	4–4	Nov 2023	M25 Vale do Lobo, Portugal	WTT	Hard	(Portugal) Francisco Rocha	(Czech Republic) Hynek Bartoň (Czech Republic) Michal Lušovský	3–0 ret.

== Wins over top 10 players ==
- Rocha has a 1–0 record against players who were, at the time the match was played, ranked in the top 10.

Season	2024	Total
Wins	1	1

#	Player	Rank	Event	Surface	Rd	Score	HRR
2024
1.	(Norway) Casper Ruud	9	Davis Cup, Bekkestua, Norway	Hard (i)	WG1	6–3, 6–4	159

*As of 14 September 2024
