= Jaime Faria =

Portuguese tennis player (born 2003)

- Faria at the 2026 Wimbledon Championships
- Country (sports): Portugal
- Born: 6 August 2003 (age 23) Lisbon, Portugal
- Height: 1.88 m (6 ft 2 in)
- Plays: Right-handed (two-handed backhand)
- Coach: Pedro Sousa
- Prize money: US $1,964,275

Singles
- Career record: 21–27
- Career titles: 0
- Highest ranking: No. 56 (19 October 2026)
- Current ranking: No. 57 (9 November 2026)

Grand Slam singles results
- Australian Open: 2R (2025, 2026)
- French Open: 3R (2026)
- Wimbledon: 2R (2026)
- US Open: 2R (2026)

Doubles
- Career record: 1–6
- Career titles: 0
- Highest ranking: No. 192 (6 May 2024)
- Current ranking: No. 444 (19 October 2026)

Grand Slam doubles results
- US Open: 1R (2026)
- Last updated on: 19 October 2026.

Jaime Faria (born 6 August 2003) is a Portuguese professional tennis player. He has a career-high ATP singles ranking of world No. 56 achieved on 19 October 2026 and a doubles ranking of No. 192, reached on 6 May 2024. He is currently the No. 2 singles player from Portugal.

== Career ==
=== 2021-2022: Professional beginnings ===
In October 2021, Faria won his first ATP point in Setúbal. In July 2022, he won his first singles and doubles titles in Castelo Branco, Portugal, on consecutive days.

=== 2023: ATP Challenger Tour debut ===
In January 2023, he made his debut on the ATP Challenger Tour. The same month he made headlines when he threw his racquet in frustration during a match at the 2023 Oeiras Indoors II in Portugal and nearly struck his opponent Aziz Dougaz.

=== 2024: Maiden Challenger title, ATP and top 125 debuts ===
In February and March, he won four consecutive tournaments on the ITF Men's World Tennis Tour, winning the Vale do Lobo Open in Portugal as well as the Vila Real de Santo António, the Faro Open, and the Quinta do Lago.

He qualified for the main draw at the 2024 Estoril Open, making his ATP Tour debut.

In May, following his maiden Challenger title at the 2024 Open de Oeiras II, Portugal, he reached the top 200 at world No. 183 on 20 May 2024. He defeated Elias Ymer in the final. Faria won his second title at the 2024 Curitiba Challenger and moved into the top 120 in the rankings on 28 October 2024.

=== 2025: Major debut and first win, two ATP quarterfinals, top 100 ===
Ranked at world No. 124, Faria qualified for the main draw of a Grand Slam event for the first time at the 2025 Australian Open. In the first round he defeated Pavel Kotov in straight sets for his first ATP and Grand Slam win. In the second round he was drawn against seventh seed Novak Djokovic and lost in four sets.

Ranked No. 106 at the 2025 Rio Open, where he entered the main draw as a lucky loser, Faria defeated qualifier Tomás Barrios Vera and Jaume Munar for his first two wins at the ATP 500-level and first two outside the Majors. It was his first ATP quarterfinal and first at the 500-level. As a result he reached the top 100 in the singles rankings on 24 February 2025. The match between him and another lucky loser (LL) Camilo Ugo Carabelli marked only the second LL vs LL quarterfinal in ATP Tour history (since 1990) after LL Max Purcell defeated LL Andreas Seppi in 2021 Eastbourne. Ranked No. 87 in the next Golden Swing event, the 2025 Chile Open in Santiago, Faria upset eight seed Luciano Darderi on his debut at the tournament. Next he defeated qualifier Gustavo Heide in three sets to reach back-to-back ATP quarterfinals.

In the first round of the 2025 French Open, he was defeated by Jenson Brooksby of the United States, in four sets. In the first round of the 2025 Wimbledon Championships he was defeated by Lorenzo Sonego of Italy, in straight sets.

=== 2026: Major third round, Masters debut, top 70 ===
Faria qualified for the 2026 Australian Open, defeating Croatian Luka Mikrut and Lebanese player Benjamin Hassan, before overcoming Argentine Marco Trungelliti in the final qualification round. He defeated former Australian Open junior champion Alexander Blockx in the first round in four sets. He was defeated in the second round by 13th seed Andrey Rublev.

He made his Masters debut at the 2026 Mutua Madrid Open after qualifying for the main draw. In the first round of qualifying for the 2026 French Open, Faria recorded a win over Grigor Dimitrov, and also qualified for the main draw with a win over Lukas Neumayer. In the main draw he recorded straight sets wins over Denis Shapovalov and Jan-Lennard Struff. He was denied a first Grand Slam fourth round after a five-set defeat against Frances Tiafoe, with his opponent coming back from two sets down.

Faria passed through the qualifying phase of the Wimbledon 2026 slam by beating Hugo Grenier, Luka Pavlovic and Rei Sakamoto respectively. He then beat Sho Shimabukuro to make it into the second round where he lost in four sets to Zizou Bergs.

He made his debut at the 2026 National Bank Open, as a lucky loser, entering the main draw directly into the second round, after the late withdrawal of second seed and home favourite Felix Auger-Aliassime. At the 2026 Cincinnati Open he recorded his first victory against a top-ten ranked player with a win against Ben Shelton. At the 2026 US Open, he won in the first round in five sets against Jenson Brooksby, in doing so he became the third Portuguese player to win a main-draw match at all four Grand Slam tournaments. In the second round he was defeated in four sets by defending champion Carlos Alcaraz.

== Performance timeline ==
Key
| W | F | SF | QF | #R | RR | Q# | DNQ | A | NH |

(W) winner; (F) finalist; (SF) semifinalist; (QF) quarterfinalist; (#R) rounds 4, 3, 2, 1; (RR) round-robin stage; (Q#) qualification round; (DNQ) did not qualify; (A) absent; (NH) not held; (SR) strike rate (events won / competed); (W–L) win–loss record.
To avoid confusion and double counting, these charts are updated at the conclusion of a tournament or when the player's participation has ended.

=== Singles ===
| Tournament | 2024 | 2025 | 2026 | SR | W–L | Win % |
|---|---|---|---|---|---|---|
Grand Slam tournaments
| Australian Open | A | 2R | 2R | 0 / 2 | 2–2 | 50% |
| French Open | Q3 | 1R | 3R | 0 / 2 | 2–2 | 50% |
| Wimbledon | Q1 | 1R | 2R | 0 / 2 | 1–2 | 33% |
| US Open | Q1 | 1R | 2R | 0 / 2 | 1–2 | 33% |
| Win–loss | 0–0 | 1–4 | 5–4 | 0 / 8 | 6–8 | 43% |
ATP Masters 1000
| Indian Wells Masters | A | A | A | 0 / 0 | 0–0 | – |
| Miami Open | A | A | A | 0 / 0 | 0–0 | – |
| Monte Carlo Masters | A | A | A | 0 / 0 | 0–0 | – |
| Madrid Open | A | A | 1R | 0 / 1 | 0-1 | 0% |
| Italian Open | A | Q2 | Q2 | 0 / 0 | 0–0 | – |
| Canadian Open | A | A | 2R | 0 / 1 | 0–1 | 0% |
| Cincinnati Masters | A | A | 4R | 0 / 1 | 3–1 | 75% |
| Shanghai Masters | A | A | 1R | 0 / 1 | 0–1 | 0% |
| Paris Masters | A | A | Q1 | 0 / 0 | 0–0 | – |
| Win–loss | 0–0 | 0–0 | 3–4 | 0 / 4 | 3–4 | 43% |

== ATP Challenger Tour finals ==
=== Singles: 5 (2 titles, 3 runners-up) ===
| Legend ATP Challenger Tour (2–3) | Finals by surface Hard (–) Clay (2–3) |

| Result | W–L | Date | Tournament | Tier | Surface | Opponent | Score |
|---|---|---|---|---|---|---|---|
| Win | 1–0 | May 2024 | Open de Oeiras II, Portugal | Challenger | Clay | (Sweden) Elias Ymer | 3–6, 7–6^{(7–3)}, 6–4 |
| Loss | 1–1 | Oct 2024 | Copa Faulcombridge, Spain | Challenger | Clay | (Spain) Pedro Martínez | 1–6, 3–6 |
| Win | 2–1 | Oct 2024 | Curitiba Challenger, Brazil | Challenger | Clay | (Brazil) Felipe Meligeni Alves | 6–4, 6–4 |
| Loss | 2–2 | Mar 2026 | LA Open, Brazil | Challenger | Clay | (Argentina) Román Andrés Burruchaga | 7–6^{(7–5)}, 4–6, 4–6 |
| Loss | 2–3 | May 2026 | Upper Austria Open, Austria | Challenger | Clay | Roman Safiullin | 6–4, 4–6, 6–7^{(4–7)} |

=== Doubles: 5 (3 titles, 2 runners-up) ===
| Legend ATP Challenger Tour (3–2) | Finals by surface Hard (1–0) Clay (2–2) |

| Result | W–L | Date | Tournament | Tier | Surface | Partner | Opponents | Score |
|---|---|---|---|---|---|---|---|---|
| Loss | 0–1 | May 2023 | Open de Oeiras II, Portugal | Challenger | Clay | (Portugal) Henrique Rocha | (United Kingdom) Luke Johnson (Netherlands) Sem Verbeek | 7–6^{(8–6)}, 5–7, [6–10] |
| Loss | 0–2 | Oct 2023 | Lisboa Belém Open, Portugal | Challenger | Clay | (Portugal) Henrique Rocha | (Poland) Karol Drzewiecki (Czech Republic) Zdeněk Kolář | 3–6, 6–7^{(5–7)} |
| Win | 1–2 | Apr 2024 | Ostra Group Open, Czech Republic | Challenger | Clay | (Portugal) Henrique Rocha | (Germany) Jakob Schnaitter (Germany) Mark Wallner | 7–5, 6–3 |
| Win | 2–2 | Sep 2024 | Cassis Open Provence, France | Challenger | Hard | (Portugal) Henrique Rocha | (France) Manuel Guinard (France) Matteo Martineau | 7–6^{(7–5)}, 6–4 |
| Win | 3–2 | Mar 2026 | Brasília Tennis Open, Brazil | Challenger | Clay | (Portugal) Henrique Rocha | (Argentina) Mariano Kestelboim (Brazil) Marcelo Zormann | 6–3, 6–2 |

== ITF World Tennis Tour finals ==
=== Singles: 7 (6 titles, 1 runner-up) ===
| Legend ITF WTT (6–1) | Finals by surface Hard (6–1) Clay (–) |

| Result | W–L | Date | Tournament | Tier | Surface | Opponent | Score |
|---|---|---|---|---|---|---|---|
| Win | 1–0 | Jul 2022 | M15 Castelo Branco, Portugal | WTT | Hard | (France) Robin Bertrand | 6–3, 7–6^{(8–6)} |
| Win | 2–0 | Oct 2022 | M15 Monastir, Tunisia | WTT | Hard | (Lebanon) Hady Habib | 7–5, 6–4 |
| Loss | 2–1 | Sep 2023 | M25 Sintra, Portugal | WTT | Hard | (United Kingdom) Harry Wendelken | 6–3, 2–6, 6–7^{(4–7)} |
| Win | 3–1 | Feb 2024 | M25 Vila Real de Santo António, Portugal | WTT | Hard | (Netherlands) Jelle Sels | 6–3, 6–0 |
| Win | 4–1 | Mar 2024 | M25 Faro, Portugal | WTT | Hard | (Lithuania) Vilius Gaubas | 6–1, 6–3 |
| Win | 5–1 | Mar 2024 | M25 Quinta do Lago, Portugal | WTT | Hard | (Lebanon) Hady Habib | 6–7^{(6–8)}, 7–6^{(7–3)}, 6–1 |
| Win | 6–1 | Mar 2024 | M25 Vale do Lobo, Portugal | WTT | Hard | (Czech Republic) Hynek Bartoň | 6–2, 3–1, ret. |

=== Doubles: 10 (6 titles, 4 runners-up) ===
| Legend ITF WTT (6–4) | Finals by surface Hard (6–2) Clay (0–2) |

| Result | W–L | Date | Tournament | Tier | Surface | Partner | Opponents | Score |
|---|---|---|---|---|---|---|---|---|
| Win | 1–0 | Jul 2022 | M15 Castelo Branco, Portugal | WTT | Hard | (Portugal) Fábio Coelho | (France) Maxence Broville (France) Pierre Delage | 6–2, 6–4 |
| Win | 2–0 | Aug 2022 | M25 Setúbal, Portugal | WTT | Hard | (Portugal) Fábio Coelho | (Finland) Eero Vasa (United Kingdom) Mark Whitehouse | 7–6^{(7–4)}, 6–3 |
| Loss | 2–1 | Apr 2023 | M25 Santa Margherita di Pula, Italy | WTT | Clay | (Portugal) Henrique Rocha | (Germany) Kai Wenhelt (Netherlands) Mick Veldheer | 6–3, 1–6, [12–14] |
| Loss | 2–2 | Sep 2023 | M25 Mataró, Spain | WTT | Clay | (Portugal) Henrique Rocha | (Switzerland) Rémy Bertola (Italy) Gianmarco Ferrari | 6–7^{(4–7)}, 6–2, [9–11] |
| Win | 3–2 | Jun 2023 | M25 Martos, Spain | WTT | Hard | (Portugal) Henrique Rocha | (India) Parikshit Somani (India) Ramkumar Ramanathan | 6–3, 7–6^{(7–3)} |
| Loss | 3–3 | Sep 2023 | M25 Sintra, Portugal | WTT | Hard | (Portugal) Henrique Rocha | (Denmark) Johannes Ingildsen (Sweden) Fred Simonsson | 6–7^{(5–7)}, 6–3, [7–10] |
| Loss | 3–4 | Sep 2023 | M25 Sintra, Portugal | WTT | Hard | (Portugal) Henrique Rocha | (United States) Dali Blanch (United States) Martin Damm Jr. | 1–6, 2–6 |
| Win | 4–4 | Oct 2023 | M25 Setúbal, Portugal | WTT | Hard | (Portugal) Henrique Rocha | (Portugal) Diogo Marques (Portugal) Fred Gil | 6–3, 6–3 |
| Win | 5–4 | Oct 2023 | M25 Tavira, Portugal | WTT | Hard | (Portugal) Henrique Rocha | (Ukraine) Aleksandr Braynin (Austria) David Pichler | 6–3, 6–1 |
| Win | 6–4 | Feb 2024 | M25 Vila Real de Santo António, Portugal | WTT | Hard | (Portugal) João Domingues | (Australia) Thomas Fancutt (United States) Hunter Reese | 7–6^{(7–2)}, 7–6^{(7–2)} |

== Record against top 10 players ==
- Faria has a 1–2 win-loss record against players who were, at the time the match was played, ranked in the top 10.

=== Wins over top 10 players ===
| Season | 2026 | Total |
|---|---|---|
| Wins | 1 | 1 |

| # | Player | Rank | Event | Surface | Rd | Score | JFR |
|---|---|---|---|---|---|---|---|
2026
| 1. | (United States) Ben Shelton | 6 | Cincinnati Open, United States | Hard | 2R | 6–4, 6–4 | 79 |

*As of 17 August 2026
