= 2021 Gran Canaria Challenger – Singles =

Singles
- 2021 Gran Canaria Challenger

Final
- Champion: (France) Enzo Couacaud
- Runner-up: (Canada) Steven Diez
- Score: 7–6^{(7–5)}, 7–6^{(7–3)}

Events
Singles	Doubles
- Gran Canaria Challenger

This was the first edition of the tournament.

Enzo Couacaud won the title after defeating Steven Diez 7–6^{(7–5)}, 7–6^{(7–3)} in the final.

== Seeds ==
1. (Italy) Lorenzo Musetti (second round)
2. (Spain) Carlos Taberner (first round, retired)
3. (Italy) Federico Gaio (first round)
4. (Serbia) Nikola Milojević (semifinals)
5. (Serbia) Danilo Petrović (first round)
6. (Italy) Lorenzo Giustino (first round)
7. (Italy) Alessandro Giannessi (second round)
8. (Slovakia) Filip Horanský (quarterfinals)

== Draw ==
Key

- Q = Qualifier
- WC = Wild card
- LL = Lucky loser
- Alt = Alternate
- ITF = ITF entry
- PR = Protected ranking
- SR = Special ranking
- SE = Special exempt
- JE = Junior exempt
- JR = Junior Accelerator Programme entrant
- CO = College Accelerator Programme entrant
- NG = Next Gen Accelerator Program entrant
- w/o = Walkover
- r = Retired
- d = Defaulted

=== Finals ===
Semifinals
Q	(Slovakia) Alex Molčan	2	6	5
(Canada) Steven Diez	6	3	7
4	(Serbia) Nikola Milojević	2	2
(France) Enzo Couacaud	6	6

Final
(Canada) Steven Diez	6^{5}	6^{3}
(France) Enzo Couacaud	7^{7}	7^{7}

=== Top half ===
First round
1	(Italy) L Musetti	6	7
Q	(Spain) Àlex Martí Pujolràs	3	5
Q	(Slovakia) A Molčan	6	6
WC	(Germany) Mark Owen Endler	0	1
(Italy) GM Moroni	6	6
Q	(France) M Guinard	3	2
(Portugal) G Oliveira	6	4	1
8	(Slovakia) F Horanský	1	6	6
3	(Italy) F Gaio	3	3
(Slovenia) B Kavčič	6	6
(Spain) N Kuhn	4	4
(Italy) R Bonadio	6	6
Q	(United States) E Nava	6^{4}	7^{7}	2
(Canada) S Diez	7^{7}	6^{4}	6
(Italy) S Napolitano	0	2
7	(Italy) A Giannessi	6	6

Second round
1	(Italy) L Musetti	6^{5}	6^{4}
Q	(Slovakia) A Molčan	7^{7}	7^{7}
(Italy) GM Moroni	6^{3}	4
8	(Slovakia) F Horanský	7^{7}	6
(Slovenia) B Kavčič	6	3	3
(Italy) R Bonadio	4	6	6
(Canada) S Diez	7^{8}	7^{10}
7	(Italy) A Giannessi	6^{6}	6^{8}

Quarterfinals
Q	(Slovakia) A Molčan	6	6
8	(Slovakia) F Horanský	2	3
(Italy) R Bonadio	3	0
(Canada) S Diez	6	6

Semifinals
Q	(Slovakia) A Molčan	2	6	5
(Canada) S Diez	6	3	7

=== Bottom half ===
First round
6	(Italy) L Giustino	6	3	4
(Spain) R Ortega Olmedo	1	6	6
(Italy) A Pellegrino	6	6
(Spain) G García López	4	3
(France) C Lestienne	6	6
(Spain) A Menéndez Maceiras	1	4
WC	(Spain) J Barranco Cosano	6	4	3
4	(Serbia) N Milojević	4	6	6
5	(Serbia) D Petrović	1	1
(Belgium) K Coppejans	6	6
WC	(Spain) C Gimeno Valero	6	6^{7}	3
(Argentina) M Trungelliti	1	7^{9}	6
Alt	(Croatia) N Serdarušić	0	4
(Spain) T Robredo	6	6
(France) E Couacaud	7^{7}	0	2
2	(Spain) C Taberner	6^{3}	6	3^{r}

Second round
(Spain) R Ortega Olmedo	4	5
(Italy) A Pellegrino	6	7
(France) C Lestienne	2	4
4	(Serbia) N Milojević	6	6
(Belgium) K Coppejans	6	3	3
(Argentina) M Trungelliti	1	6	6
(Spain) T Robredo	1	2
(France) E Couacaud	6	6

Quarterfinals
(Italy) A Pellegrino	6	1	4
4	(Serbia) N Milojević	4	6	6
(Argentina) M Trungelliti	1	6	6^{6}
(France) E Couacaud	6	0	7^{8}

Semifinals
4	(Serbia) N Milojević	2	2
(France) E Couacaud	6	6
