= 2021 Gran Canaria Challenger =

- Date: 22–28 February
- Edition: 1st
- Surface: Clay
- Location: Las Palmas, Spain

Champions

Singles
- (France) Enzo Couacaud

Doubles
- (United Kingdom) Lloyd Glasspool / (Finland) Harri Heliövaara
Gran Canaria Challenger	· 2021 →

The 2021 Gran Canaria Challenger was a professional tennis tournament played on clay courts. It was the first edition of the tournament which was part of the 2021 ATP Challenger Tour. It took place in Las Palmas, Spain between 22 and 28 February 2021.

== Singles main-draw entrants ==
=== Seeds ===
Country	Player	Rank^{1}	Seed
ITA	Lorenzo Musetti	122	1
ESP	Carlos Taberner	128	2
ITA	Federico Gaio	140	3
SRB	Nikola Milojević	145	4
SRB	Danilo Petrović	153	5
ITA	Lorenzo Giustino	157	6
ITA	Alessandro Giannessi	160	7
SVK	Filip Horanský	164	8

- ^{1} Rankings as of 15 February 2021.

=== Other entrants ===
The following players received wildcards into the singles main draw:

- (Spain) Javier Barranco Cosano
- (Germany) Mark Owen Endler
- (Spain) Carlos Gimeno Valero

The following player received entry into the singles main draw as an alternate:

- (Croatia) Nino Serdarušić

The following players received entry from the qualifying draw:

- (France) Manuel Guinard
- (Spain) Àlex Martí Pujolràs
- (Slovakia) Alex Molčan
- (United States) Emilio Nava

== Champions ==
=== Singles ===
- (France) Enzo Couacaud def. (Canada) Steven Diez 7–6^{(7–5)}, 7–6^{(7–3)}.

=== Doubles ===
- (United Kingdom) Lloyd Glasspool / (Finland) Harri Heliövaara def. (Belgium) Kimmer Coppejans / (Spain) Sergio Martos Gornés 7–5, 6–1.
