= 2022 Gran Canaria Challenger – Doubles =

Doubles
- 2022 Gran Canaria Challenger

Final
- Champions: (France) Sadio Doumbia (France) Fabien Reboul
- Runners-up: (Italy) Matteo Arnaldi (Italy) Luciano Darderi
- Score: 5–7, 6–4, [10–7]

Events
Singles	Doubles
- Gran Canaria Challenger

Enzo Couacaud and Manuel Guinard were the defending champions but chose not to defend their title.

Sadio Doumbia and Fabien Reboul won the title after defeating Matteo Arnaldi and Luciano Darderi 5–7, 6–4, [10–7] in the final.

== Seeds ==
1. (France) Sadio Doumbia / (France) Fabien Reboul (champions)
2. (Slovakia) Andrej Martin / (Austria) Tristan-Samuel Weissborn (quarterfinals)
3. (Switzerland) Luca Margaroli / (Portugal) Gonçalo Oliveira (first round)
4. (Spain) Eduard Esteve Lobato / (Spain) David Vega Hernández (quarterfinals)

== Draw ==
Key

- Q = Qualifier
- WC = Wild card
- LL = Lucky loser
- Alt = Alternate
- ITF = ITF entry
- PR = Protected ranking
- SR = Special ranking
- SE = Special exempt
- JE = Junior exempt
- JR = Junior Accelerator Programme entrant
- CO = College Accelerator Programme entrant
- NG = Next Gen Accelerator Program entrant
- w/o = Walkover
- r = Retired
- d = Defaulted

First round
1	(France) S Doumbia (France) F Reboul	7^{7}	6
(Germany) H Jebens (Germany) Niklas Schell	6^{4}	2
WC	(Spain) Iván Marrero Curbelo (Spain) P Toledo Bagué	4	1
(Italy) S Caruso (Italy) A Giannessi	6	6
4	(Spain) Eduard Esteve Lobato (Spain) D Vega Hernández	6	6
(Brazil) Oscar José Gutierrez (Netherlands) M Hermans	2	2
(Spain) J Barranco Cosano (Italy) R Brancaccio	6	4	[10]
(Croatia) D Ajduković (Italy) R Bonadio	3	6	[7]
(Portugal) J Domingues (Italy) L Giustino	1	4
(Italy) GM Moroni (Czech Republic) L Rosol	6	6
(Italy) M Arnaldi (Italy) L Darderi	7	6
3	(Switzerland) L Margaroli (Portugal) G Oliveira	5	2
Alt	(Japan) R Noguchi (Ukraine) V Orlov	3	4
(Netherlands) M Vervoort (Serbia) M Zekić	6	6
WC	(Spain) O Roca Batalla (Spain) N Sánchez Izquierdo	3	4
2	(Slovakia) A Martin (Austria) T-S Weissborn	6	6

Quarterfinals
1	(France) S Doumbia (France) F Reboul	6	3
(Italy) S Caruso (Italy) A Giannessi	4	3^{r}
4	(Spain) E Esteve Lobato (Spain) D Vega Hernández	4	4
(Spain) J Barranco Cosano (Italy) R Brancaccio	6	6
(Italy) GM Moroni (Czech Republic) L Rosol
(Italy) M Arnaldi (Italy) L Darderi	w/o
(Netherlands) M Vervoort (Serbia) M Zekić	6	3	[13]
2	(Slovakia) A Martin (Austria) T-S Weissborn	4	6	[11]

Semifinals
1	(France) S Doumbia (France) F Reboul	6	6
(Spain) J Barranco Cosano (Italy) R Brancaccio	2	3
(Italy) M Arnaldi (Italy) L Darderi	6	6
(Netherlands) M Vervoort (Serbia) M Zekić	4	4

Final
1	(France) S Doumbia (France) F Reboul	5	6	[10]
(Italy) M Arnaldi (Italy) L Darderi	7	4	[7]
