= 2021 Gran Canaria Challenger – Doubles =

Doubles
- 2021 Gran Canaria Challenger

Final
- Champions: (United Kingdom) Lloyd Glasspool (Finland) Harri Heliövaara
- Runners-up: (Belgium) Kimmer Coppejans (Spain) Sergio Martos Gornés
- Score: 7–5, 6–1

Events
Singles	Doubles
- Gran Canaria Challenger

This was the first edition of the tournament.

Lloyd Glasspool and Harri Heliövaara won the title after defeating Kimmer Coppejans and Sergio Martos Gornés 7–5, 6–1 in the final.

== Seeds ==
1. (Poland) Karol Drzewiecki / (Portugal) Gonçalo Oliveira (semifinals)
2. (United Kingdom) Lloyd Glasspool / (Finland) Harri Heliövaara (champions)
3. (France) Sadio Doumbia / (France) Fabien Reboul (first round)
4. (Croatia) Ivan Sabanov / (Croatia) Matej Sabanov (quarterfinals)

== Draw ==
Key

- Q = Qualifier
- WC = Wild card
- LL = Lucky loser
- Alt = Alternate
- ITF = ITF entry
- PR = Protected ranking
- SR = Special ranking
- SE = Special exempt
- JE = Junior exempt
- JR = Junior Accelerator Programme entrant
- CO = College Accelerator Programme entrant
- NG = Next Gen Accelerator Program entrant
- w/o = Walkover
- r = Retired
- d = Defaulted

First round
1	(Poland) K Drzewiecki (Portugal) G Oliveira	4	7^{8}	[10]
(Slovakia) F Horanský (Slovakia) A Molčan	6	6^{6}	[3]
(Canada) S Diez (Italy) GM Moroni	2	4
(Italy) M Bortolotti (Italy) A Pellegrino	6	6
4	(Croatia) I Sabanov (Croatia) M Sabanov	3	6	[10]
WC	(Germany) Mark Owen Endler (Spain) A Menéndez Maceiras	6	3	[2]
(Belgium) K Coppejans (Spain) S Martos Gornés	7^{8}	7^{7}
(Italy) A Giannessi (Italy) S Napolitano	6^{6}	6^{3}
(France) E Couacaud (France) M Guinard	5	6	[10]
Alt	(Serbia) N Serdarušić (Czech Republic) M Vrbenský	7	4	[8]
(Italy) L Giustino (Argentina) M Trungelliti	3	6	[10]
3	(France) S Doumbia (France) F Reboul	6	3	[8]
Alt	(Spain) R Ortega Olmedo (Spain) O Roca Batalla	3	4
WC	(Spain) Eduard Esteve Lobato (Spain) G García López	6	6
WC	(Spain) Iván Marrero Curbelo (United States) E Nava	5	1
2	(United Kingdom) L Glasspool (Finland) H Heliövaara	7	6

Quarterfinals
1	(Poland) K Drzewiecki (Portugal) G Oliveira	3	7^{7}	[10]
(Italy) M Bortolotti (Italy) A Pellegrino	6	6^{2}	[6]
4	(Croatia) I Sabanov (Croatia) M Sabanov	3	5
(Belgium) K Coppejans (Spain) S Martos Gornés	6	7
(France) E Couacaud (France) M Guinard	6	3	[11]
(Italy) L Giustino (Argentina) M Trungelliti	1	6	[13]
WC	(Spain) E Esteve Lobato (Spain) G García López	4	1
2	(United Kingdom) L Glasspool (Finland) H Heliövaara	6	6

Semifinals
1	(Poland) K Drzewiecki (Portugal) G Oliveira	2	5
(Belgium) K Coppejans (Spain) S Martos Gornés	6	7
(Italy) L Giustino (Argentina) M Trungelliti	0	1
2	(United Kingdom) L Glasspool (Finland) H Heliövaara	6	6

Final
(Belgium) K Coppejans (Spain) S Martos Gornés	5	1
2	(United Kingdom) L Glasspool (Finland) H Heliövaara	7	6
