= 2021 Gran Canaria Challenger II – Singles =

Singles
- 2021 Gran Canaria Challenger II

Final
- Champion: (Spain) Carlos Gimeno Valero
- Runner-up: (Belgium) Kimmer Coppejans
- Score: 6–4, 6–2

Events
| Singles | Doubles |
- Gran Canaria Challenger

This was the second edition of the tournament in the 2021 tennis season. Enzo Couacaud was the defending champion but lost in the second round to Alex Molčan.

Carlos Gimeno Valero won the title after defeating Kimmer Coppejans 6–4, 6–2 in the final.

== Seeds ==
1. (Spain) Carlos Alcaraz (second round)
2. (Italy) Federico Gaio (second round)
3. (Serbia) Nikola Milojević (second round)
4. (Serbia) Danilo Petrović (first round, retired)
5. (Italy) Lorenzo Giustino (first round)
6. (Italy) Alessandro Giannessi (quarterfinals)
7. (Slovakia) Filip Horanský (second round)
8. (Belgium) Kimmer Coppejans (final)

== Draw ==
Key

- Q = Qualifier
- WC = Wild card
- LL = Lucky loser
- Alt = Alternate
- ITF = ITF entry
- PR = Protected ranking
- SR = Special ranking
- SE = Special exempt
- JE = Junior exempt
- JR = Junior Accelerator Programme entrant
- CO = College Accelerator Programme entrant
- NG = Next Gen Accelerator Program entrant
- w/o = Walkover
- r = Retired
- d = Defaulted

=== Finals ===
Semifinals
8 | (Belgium) Kimmer Coppejans | 7^{7} | 6
Q | (Spain) Eduard Esteve Lobato | 6^{1} | 2
(Slovenia) Blaž Kavčič | 6 | 1 | 5
WC | (Spain) Carlos Gimeno Valero | 3 | 6 | 7

Final
8 | (Belgium) Kimmer Coppejans | 4 | 2
WC | (Spain) Carlos Gimeno Valero | 6 | 6

=== Top half ===
First round
1/WC | (Spain) C Alcaraz | 6 | 6^{3} | 6
Q | (Romania) FC Jianu | 3 | 7^{7} | 1
(Spain) A Menéndez Maceiras | 0 | 2
(Argentina) M Trungelliti | 6 | 6
(Spain) N Kuhn | 2 | 2
(Canada) S Diez | 6 | 6
(Portugal) G Oliveira | 5 | 6^{2}
8 | (Belgium) K Coppejans | 7 | 7^{7}
3 | (Serbia) N Milojević | 6 | 6
(Spain) T Robredo | 2 | 3
Q | (Spain) Eduard Esteve Lobato | 7^{7} | 6
(Spain) G García López | 6^{4} | 2
Q | (Italy) G Zeppieri | 6 | 6
(France) M Guinard | 0 | 3
LL | (Switzerland) S Ehrat | 6^{9} | 7 | 3
7 | (Slovakia) F Horanský | 7^{11} | 5 | 6

Second round
1/WC | (Spain) C Alcaraz | 6^{5} | 3
(Argentina) M Trungelliti | 7^{7} | 6
(Canada) S Diez | 6 | 0 | 5
8 | (Belgium) K Coppejans | 2 | 6 | 7
3 | (Serbia) N Milojević | 5 | 3
Q | (Spain) E Esteve Lobato | 7 | 6
Q | (Italy) G Zeppieri | 7^{9} | 6
7 | (Slovakia) F Horanský | 6^{7} | 1

Quarterfinals
(Argentina) M Trungelliti | 6^{4} | 7 | 0
8 | (Belgium) K Coppejans | 7^{7} | 5 | 6
Q | (Spain) E Esteve Lobato | 6 | 5 | 6
Q | (Italy) G Zeppieri | 4 | 7 | 4

Semifinals
8 | (Belgium) K Coppejans | 7^{7} | 6
Q | (Spain) E Esteve Lobato | 6^{1} | 2

=== Bottom half ===
First round
5 | (Italy) L Giustino | 6^{2} | 7 | 1
(France) E Couacaud | 7^{7} | 5 | 6
(Spain) R Ortega Olmedo | 3 | 6^{4}
(Slovakia) A Molčan | 6 | 7^{7}
(Slovenia) B Kavčič | 6 | 6
(Czech Republic) M Vrbenský | 4 | 4
(Italy) R Bonadio | 5
4 | (Serbia) D Petrović | 2^{r}
6 | (Italy) A Giannessi | 6 | 6
Q | (United States) E Nava | 2 | 3
WC | (Spain) N Sánchez Izquierdo | 5 | 7 | 6
(Italy) A Pellegrino | 7 | 5 | 3
(France) C Lestienne | 4 | 1^{r}
WC | (Spain) C Gimeno Valero | 6 | 3
Alt | (Spain) J Barranco Cosano | 7^{7} | 2 | 2
2 | (Italy) F Gaio | 6^{3} | 6 | 6

Second round
(France) E Couacaud | 2 | 4
(Slovakia) A Molčan | 6 | 6
(Slovenia) B Kavčič | 6 | 6
(Italy) R Bonadio | 2 | 4
6 | (Italy) A Giannessi | 7^{11} | 7
WC | (Spain) N Sánchez Izquierdo | 6^{9} | 5
WC | (Spain) C Gimeno Valero | 6 | 3 | 6
2 | (Italy) F Gaio | 0 | 6 | 3

Quarterfinals
(Slovakia) A Molčan | 4 | 5
(Slovenia) B Kavčič | 6 | 7
6 | (Italy) A Giannessi | 2 | 6 | 2
WC | (Spain) C Gimeno Valero | 6 | 4 | 6

Semifinals
(Slovenia) B Kavčič | 6 | 1 | 5
WC | (Spain) C Gimeno Valero | 3 | 6 | 7
