= 2022 Gran Canaria Challenger – Singles =

Singles
- 2022 Gran Canaria Challenger

Final
- Champion: (Italy) Gianluca Mager
- Runner-up: (Spain) Roberto Carballés Baena
- Score: 7–6^{(8–6)}, 6–2

Events
Singles	Doubles
- Gran Canaria Challenger

Carlos Gimeno Valero was the defending champion but lost in the second round to Salvatore Caruso.

Gianluca Mager won the title after defeating Roberto Carballés Baena 7–6^{(8–6)}, 6–2 in the final.

== Seeds ==
1. (Spain) Roberto Carballés Baena (final)
2. (Italy) Gianluca Mager (champion)
3. (Slovakia) Andrej Martin (second round)
4. (Italy) Salvatore Caruso (quarterfinals)
5. (Italy) Alessandro Giannessi (first round)
6. (Italy) Gian Marco Moroni (first round)
7. (Italy) Federico Gaio (first round)
8. (Italy) Lorenzo Giustino (first round)

== Draw ==
Key

- Q = Qualifier
- WC = Wild card
- LL = Lucky loser
- Alt = Alternate
- ITF = ITF entry
- PR = Protected ranking
- SR = Special ranking
- SE = Special exempt
- JE = Junior exempt
- JR = Junior Accelerator Programme entrant
- CO = College Accelerator Programme entrant
- NG = Next Gen Accelerator Program entrant
- w/o = Walkover
- r = Retired
- d = Defaulted

=== Finals ===
Semifinals
1/WC	(Spain) Roberto Carballés Baena	6	7^{7}
(Croatia) Duje Ajduković	3	6^{4}
(Italy) Riccardo Bonadio	2	6^{5}
2	(Italy) Gianluca Mager	6	7^{7}

Final
1/WC	(Spain) Roberto Carballés Baena	6^{6}	2
2	(Italy) Gianluca Mager	7^{8}	6

=== Top half ===
First round
1/WC	(Spain) R Carballés Baena	6	6
(Italy) L Darderi	2	4
(Serbia) M Zekić	4	3
WC	(Spain) P Martín Tiffon	6	6
(Portugal) G Oliveira	6	6
(France) M Bourgue	4	1
Q	(Switzerland) J Nikles	2	7^{7}	6
7	(Italy) F Gaio	6	6^{5}	3
4	(Italy) S Caruso	5	6	6
Q	(Spain) Carlos López Montagud	7	0	4
(Spain) C Gimeno Valero	6	6
(Kazakhstan) T Skatov	2	1
Q	(Spain) M Damas	4	0
(Croatia) D Ajduković	6	6
(Spain) N Sánchez Izquierdo	6	6
8	(Italy) L Giustino	2	2

Second round
1/WC	(Spain) R Carballés Baena	7^{7}	6
WC	(Spain) P Martín Tiffon	6^{5}	1
(Portugal) G Oliveira	7	5	5
Q	(Switzerland) J Nikles	5	7	7
4	(Italy) S Caruso	6	6
(Spain) C Gimeno Valero	3	4
(Croatia) D Ajduković	7	6
(Spain) N Sánchez Izquierdo	5	1

Quarterfinals
1/WC	(Spain) R Carballés Baena	6	6
Q	(Switzerland) J Nikles	1	3
4	(Italy) S Caruso	6^{4}	6	4
(Croatia) D Ajduković	7^{7}	1	6

Semifinals
1/WC	(Spain) R Carballés Baena	6	7^{7}
(Croatia) D Ajduković	3	6^{4}

=== Bottom half ===
First round
5	(Italy) A Giannessi	6^{7}	6	6^{2}
(Czech Republic) L Rosol	7^{9}	3	7^{7}
(United States) N Moreno de Alboran	6	6
WC	(Spain) P Llamas Ruiz	0	2
(Italy) R Bonadio	6	6
Q	(France) Matthieu Perchicot	1	2
(Spain) N Álvarez Varona	1	1
3	(Slovakia) A Martin	6	6
6	(Italy) GM Moroni	0	1
(Italy) R Brancaccio	6	6
(Spain) Eduard Esteve Lobato	6^{4}	6	7^{7}
(Portugal) J Domingues	7^{7}	2	6^{2}
Q	(Spain) O Roca Batalla	4	4
(Spain) J Barranco Cosano	6	6
Q	(Spain) P Toledo Bagué	4	2
2	(Italy) G Mager	6	6

Second round
(Czech Republic) L Rosol	6	1	4
(United States) N Moreno de Alboran	3	6	6
(Italy) R Bonadio	7^{8}	7
3	(Slovakia) A Martin	6^{6}	5
(Italy) R Brancaccio	7^{7}	6
(Spain) E Esteve Lobato	6^{2}	1
(Spain) J Barranco Cosano	2	6	3
2	(Italy) G Mager	6	4	6

Quarterfinals
(United States) N Moreno de Alboran	6	3	2
(Italy) R Bonadio	3	6	6
(Italy) R Brancaccio	2	1
2	(Italy) G Mager	6	6

Semifinals
(Italy) R Bonadio	2	6^{5}
2	(Italy) G Mager	6	7^{7}
