= 2021 Open de Oeiras IV =

- Date: 24–30 May
- Edition: 4th
- Surface: Clay
- Location: Oeiras, Portugal

Champions

Singles
- (Portugal) Gastão Elias

Doubles
- (Netherlands) Jesper de Jong / (Netherlands) Tim van Rijthoven
← 2021 ·	Open de Oeiras	· 2022 →

The 2021 Open de Oeiras IV was a professional tennis tournament played on clay courts. It was the fourth edition of the tournament which was part of the 2021 ATP Challenger Tour. It took place in Oeiras, Portugal between 24 and 30 May 2021.

== Singles main-draw entrants ==
=== Seeds ===
Country	Player	Rank^{1}	Seed
FRA	Mathias Bourgue	195	1
TPE	Wu Tung-lin	267	2
GER	Julian Lenz	269	3
TPE	Tseng Chun-hsin	274	4
ECU	Roberto Quiroz	275	5
ESP	Carlos Gimeno Valero	286	6
ARG	Pedro Cachin	292	7
ITA	Riccardo Bonadio	293	8

- ^{1} Rankings are as of 17 May 2021.

=== Other entrants ===
The following players received wildcards into the singles main draw:

- (Portugal) Pedro Araújo
- (Portugal) Tiago Cação
- (Portugal) Luís Faria

The following player received entry into the singles main draw using a protected ranking:

- (Croatia) Viktor Galović

The following player received entry into the singles main draw as an alternate:

- (France) Corentin Denolly

The following players received entry from the qualifying draw:

- (Romania) Filip Cristian Jianu
- (Spain) Nikolás Sánchez Izquierdo
- (Kazakhstan) Timofey Skatov
- (Kazakhstan) Denis Yevseyev

== Champions ==
=== Singles ===
- (Portugal) Gastão Elias def. (Denmark) Holger Rune 5–7, 6–4, 6–4.

=== Doubles ===
- (Netherlands) Jesper de Jong / (Netherlands) Tim van Rijthoven def. (Germany) Julian Lenz / (Ecuador) Roberto Quiroz 6–1, 7–6^{(7–3)}.
