= 2021 Gran Canaria Challenger II =

- Date: 1–7 March
- Edition: 2nd
- Surface: Clay
- Location: Las Palmas, Spain

Champions

Singles
- (Spain) Carlos Gimeno Valero

Doubles
- (France) Enzo Couacaud / (France) Manuel Guinard
← 2021 ·	Gran Canaria Challenger	· 2022 →

The 2021 Gran Canaria Challenger II was a professional tennis tournament played on clay courts. It was the second edition of the tournament which was part of the 2021 ATP Challenger Tour. It took place in Las Palmas, Spain between 1 and 7 March 2021.

== Singles main-draw entrants ==
=== Seeds ===
Country	Player	Rank^{1}	Seed
ESP	Carlos Alcaraz	127	1
ITA	Federico Gaio	133	2
SRB	Nikola Milojević	149	3
SRB	Danilo Petrović	154	4
ITA	Lorenzo Giustino	158	5
ITA	Alessandro Giannessi	163	6
SVK	Filip Horanský	170	7
BEL	Kimmer Coppejans	182	8

- ^{1} Rankings as of 22 February 2021.

=== Other entrants ===
The following players received wildcards into the singles main draw:

- (Spain) Carlos Alcaraz
- (Spain) Carlos Gimeno Valero
- (Spain) Nikolás Sánchez Izquierdo

The following player received entry into the singles main draw as an alternate:

- (Spain) Javier Barranco Cosano

The following players received entry from the qualifying draw:

- (Spain) Eduard Esteve Lobato
- (Romania) Filip Cristian Jianu
- (United States) Emilio Nava
- (Italy) Giulio Zeppieri

The following player received entry as a lucky loser:

- (Switzerland) Sandro Ehrat

== Champions ==
=== Singles ===
- (Spain) Carlos Gimeno Valero def. (Belgium) Kimmer Coppejans 6–4, 6–2.

=== Doubles ===
- (France) Enzo Couacaud / (France) Manuel Guinard def. (Spain) Javier Barranco Cosano / (Spain) Eduard Esteve Lobato 6–1, 6–4.
