= 2021 Open de Oeiras III – Singles =

Singles
- 2021 Open de Oeiras III

Final
- Champion: (Spain) Carlos Alcaraz
- Runner-up: (Argentina) Facundo Bagnis
- Score: 6–4, 6–4

Events
Singles	Doubles
← 2021 ·	Open de Oeiras	· 2021 →

Pedro Cachin was the defending champion but chose to not defend his title.

Carlos Alcaraz won the title after defeating Facundo Bagnis 6–4, 6–4 in the final.

== Seeds ==
1. (Czech Republic) Jiří Veselý (second round, retired)
2. (United States) Steve Johnson (first round)
3. (Argentina) Federico Coria (second round)
4. (Spain) Pedro Martínez (second round)
5. (Germany) Yannick Hanfmann (first round)
6. (Argentina) Juan Ignacio Londero (first round)
7. (Argentina) Facundo Bagnis (final)
8. (Portugal) Pedro Sousa (quarterfinals)

== Draw ==
=== Key ===
- Q = Qualifier
- WC = Wild card
- LL = Lucky loser
- Alt = Alternate
- SE = Special exempt
- PR = Protected ranking
- ITF = ITF entry
- JE = Junior exempt
- w/o = Walkover
- r = Retired
- d = Defaulted
- SR = Special ranking

=== Finals ===
Semifinals
(Japan) Taro Daniel	2	7	2
(Spain) Carlos Alcaraz	6	5	6
7	(Argentina) Facundo Bagnis	6	6
(France) Hugo Gaston	0	2

Final
(Spain) Carlos Alcaraz	6	6
7	(Argentina) Facundo Bagnis	4	4

=== Top half ===
First round
1	(Czech Republic) J Veselý	6	7^{7}
Q	(France) H Grenier	4	6^{2}
(Austria) S Ofner	1	6^{4}
(Bolivia) H Dellien	6	7^{7}
(Slovenia) B Rola	1	5
(Japan) T Daniel	6	7
(Argentina) L Mayer	4	6	6
6	(Argentina) JI Londero	6	1	4
3	(Argentina) F Coria	2	6	6
Q	(Slovakia) A Molčan	6	4	1
(United States) M Cressy	6^{3}	4
WC	(Portugal) G Elias	7^{7}	6
(Spain) C Alcaraz	6	6
(Japan) Y Uchiyama	0	3
(United States) B Nakashima	6	6
5	(Germany) Y Hanfmann	3	4

Second round
1	(Czech Republic) J Veselý	3	3^{r}
(Bolivia) H Dellien	6	4
(Japan) T Daniel	6	6
(Argentina) L Mayer	3	4
3	(Argentina) F Coria	4	6	4
WC	(Portugal) G Elias	6	4	6
(Spain) C Alcaraz	3	6	6
(United States) B Nakashima	6	4	4

Quarterfinals
(Bolivia) H Dellien	1	6	1
(Japan) T Daniel	6	3	6
WC	(Portugal) G Elias	5	4
(Spain) C Alcaraz	7	6

Semifinals
(Japan) T Daniel	2	7	2
(Spain) C Alcaraz	6	5	6

=== Bottom half ===
First round
7	(Argentina) F Bagnis	7	3
(Spain) C Taberner	5	2^{r}
(Chinese Taipei) J Jung	6	4	3
Alt	(Portugal) F Ferreira Silva	1	6	6
WC	(Portugal) N Borges	6	6
(Spain) B Zapata Miralles	4	4
WC	(Portugal) J Domingues	4	2
4	(Spain) P Martínez	6	6
8	(Portugal) P Sousa	3	7^{7}	4
(Bosnia and Herzegovina) D Džumhur	6	6^{4}	0^{r}
(United States) D Kudla	4	6	5
(Netherlands) B van de Zandschulp	6	3	7
(France) H Gaston	7^{7}	6
Q	(Belgium) Z Bergs	6^{1}	1
Q	(Ecuador) E Gómez	7^{7}	3	6
2	(United States) S Johnson	6^{4}	6	3

Second round
7	(Argentina) F Bagnis	2	6	6
Alt	(Portugal) F Ferreira Silva	6	4	2
WC	(Portugal) N Borges	6	6
4	(Spain) P Martínez	2	4
8	(Portugal) P Sousa	6	6
(Netherlands) B van de Zandschulp	3	2
(France) H Gaston	6	6
Q	(Ecuador) E Gómez	4	3

Quarterfinals
7	(Argentina) F Bagnis	6	5	7
WC	(Portugal) N Borges	1	7	5
8	(Portugal) P Sousa	3	6	2
(France) H Gaston	6	1	6

Semifinals
7	(Argentina) F Bagnis	6	6
(France) H Gaston	0	2
