= 2021 Gran Canaria Challenger II – Doubles =

Doubles
- 2021 Gran Canaria Challenger II

Final
- Champions: (France) Enzo Couacaud (France) Manuel Guinard
- Runners-up: (Spain) Javier Barranco Cosano (Spain) Eduard Esteve Lobato
- Score: 6–1, 6–4

Events
Singles	Doubles
- Gran Canaria Challenger

This was the second edition of the tournament in the 2021 tennis season. Lloyd Glasspool and Harri Heliövaara were the defending champions but lost in the quarterfinals to Enzo Couacaud and Manuel Guinard.

Couacaud and Guinard won the title after defeating Javier Barranco Cosano and Eduard Esteve Lobato 6–1, 6–4 in the final.

== Seeds ==
1. (United Kingdom) Lloyd Glasspool / (Finland) Harri Heliövaara (quarterfinals)
2. (Poland) Karol Drzewiecki / (Brazil) Fernando Romboli (quarterfinals)
3. (Spain) Sergio Martos Gornés / (Spain) David Vega Hernández (semifinals)
4. (France) Sadio Doumbia / (France) Fabien Reboul (semifinals)

== Draw ==
Key

- Q = Qualifier
- WC = Wild card
- LL = Lucky loser
- Alt = Alternate
- ITF = ITF entry
- PR = Protected ranking
- SR = Special ranking
- SE = Special exempt
- JE = Junior exempt
- JR = Junior Accelerator Programme entrant
- CO = College Accelerator Programme entrant
- NG = Next Gen Accelerator Program entrant
- w/o = Walkover
- r = Retired
- d = Defaulted

First round
1	(United Kingdom) L Glasspool (Finland) H Heliövaara	6	7^{7}
(Slovenia) B Kavčič (Portugal) G Oliveira	3	6^{3}
WC	(Spain) Rubén Díaz Hernández (Spain) Tomás Quesada Pérez	1	0
(France) E Couacaud (France) M Guinard	6	6
4	(France) S Doumbia (France) F Reboul	7	6^{6}	[10]
(Romania) VV Cornea (Czech Republic) M Vrbenský	5	7^{8}	[2]
(Italy) M Bortolotti (Spain) A Menéndez Maceiras	3	4
(Spain) Í Cervantes (Spain) O Roca Batalla	6	6
WC	(Spain) John Echeverría (Spain) Iván Marrero Curbelo	3
(Italy) A Giannessi (Italy) A Pellegrino	3^{r}
(Croatia) I Sabanov (Croatia) M Sabanov	6^{7}	4
3	(Spain) S Martos Gornés (Spain) D Vega Hernández	7^{9}	6
(Spain) J Barranco Cosano (Spain) Eduard Esteve Lobato	7	6
WC	(Germany) Marc Owen Endler (Spain) G García López	5	2
(Canada) S Diez (Spain) R Ortega Olmedo
2	(Poland) K Drzewiecki (Brazil) F Romboli	w/o

Quarterfinals
1	(United Kingdom) L Glasspool (Finland) H Heliövaara	6	6^{3}	[10]
(France) E Couacaud (France) M Guinard	3	7^{7}	[12]
4	(France) S Doumbia (France) F Reboul	2	7	[12]
(Spain) Í Cervantes (Spain) O Roca Batalla	6	5	[10]
WC	(Spain) J Echeverría (Spain) I Marrero Curbelo	4	2
3	(Spain) S Martos Gornés (Spain) D Vega Hernández	6	6
(Spain) J Barranco Cosano (Spain) E Esteve Lobato	6	6
2	(Poland) K Drzewiecki (Brazil) F Romboli	3	4

Semifinals
(France) E Couacaud (France) M Guinard	6	6
4	(France) S Doumbia (France) F Reboul	4	1
3	(Spain) S Martos Gornés (Spain) D Vega Hernández	3	5
(Spain) J Barranco Cosano (Spain) E Esteve Lobato	6	7

Final
(France) E Couacaud (France) M Guinard	6	6
(Spain) J Barranco Cosano (Spain) E Esteve Lobato	1	4
