= 2021 Open de Oeiras III – Doubles =

Doubles
- 2021 Open de Oeiras III

Final
- Champions: (United States) Hunter Reese (Netherlands) Sem Verbeek
- Runners-up: (France) Sadio Doumbia (France) Fabien Reboul
- Score: 4–6, 6–4, [10–7]

Events
Singles	Doubles
- Open de Oeiras

Nuno Borges and Francisco Cabral were the defending champions but lost in the semifinals to Hunter Reese and Sem Verbeek.

Reese and Verbeek won the title after defeating Sadio Doumbia and Fabien Reboul 4–6, 6–4, [10–7] in the final.

== Seeds ==
1. (Pakistan) Aisam-ul-Haq Qureshi / (Australia) Matt Reid (first round)
2. (Venezuela) Luis David Martínez / (Spain) David Vega Hernández (first round)
3. (Monaco) Romain Arneodo / (Poland) Szymon Walków (quarterfinals)
4. (Mexico) Miguel Ángel Reyes-Varela / (Brazil) Fernando Romboli (first round)

== Draw ==
Key

- Q = Qualifier
- WC = Wild card
- LL = Lucky loser
- Alt = Alternate
- ITF = ITF entry
- PR = Protected ranking
- SR = Special ranking
- SE = Special exempt
- JE = Junior exempt
- JR = Junior Accelerator Programme entrant
- CO = College Accelerator Programme entrant
- NG = Next Gen Accelerator Program entrant
- w/o = Walkover
- r = Retired
- d = Defaulted

First round
1	(Pakistan) A-u-H Qureshi (Australia) M Reid	2	6	[13]
(Argentina) F Coria (Ecuador) E Gómez	6	2	[15]
(United States) S Johnson (United States) M Schnur	2	7	[10]
(Brazil) R Matos (Portugal) P Sousa	6	5	[7]
4	(Mexico) MÁ Reyes-Varela (Brazil) F Romboli	3	4
(Czech Republic) R Jebavý (Czech Republic) J Veselý	6	6
(France) S Doumbia (France) F Reboul	6	6
(Bolivia) H Dellien (Argentina) L Mayer	4	3
(Spain) P Martínez (Spain) B Zapata Miralles	3	6	[9]
WC	(Portugal) N Borges (Portugal) F Cabral	6	3	[11]
WC	(Portugal) G Elias (Portugal) Gonçalo Falcão	1	3
3	(Monaco) R Arneodo (Poland) S Walków	6	6
WC	(Portugal) J Domingues (Portugal) F Ferreira Silva	6	6^{4}	[8]
(Portugal) G Oliveira (Japan) Y Uchiyama	1	7^{7}	[10]
(United States) H Reese (Netherlands) S Verbeek	6	7
2	(Venezuela) LD Martínez (Spain) D Vega Hernández	1	5

Quarterfinals
(Argentina) F Coria (Ecuador) E Gómez	6^{6}	4
(United States) S Johnson (United States) M Schnur	7^{8}	6
(Czech Republic) R Jebavý (Czech Republic) J Veselý	2	7^{11}	[7]
(France) S Doumbia (France) F Reboul	6	6^{9}	[10]
WC	(Portugal) N Borges (Portugal) F Cabral	7	6
3	(Monaco) R Arneodo (Poland) S Walków	5	3
(Portugal) G Oliveira (Japan) Y Uchiyama	6	5	[3]
(United States) H Reese (Netherlands) S Verbeek	2	7	[10]

Semifinals
(United States) S Johnson (United States) M Schnur	6^{2}	3
(France) S Doumbia (France) F Reboul	7^{7}	6
WC	(Portugal) N Borges (Portugal) F Cabral	4	4
(United States) H Reese (Netherlands) S Verbeek	6	6

Final
(France) S Doumbia (France) F Reboul	6	4	[7]
(United States) H Reese (Netherlands) S Verbeek	4	6	[10]
