= 2021 Open de Oeiras IV – Doubles =

Doubles
- 2021 Open de Oeiras IV

Final
- Champions: (Netherlands) Jesper de Jong (Netherlands) Tim van Rijthoven
- Runners-up: (Germany) Julian Lenz (Ecuador) Roberto Quiroz
- Score: 6–1, 7–6^{(7–3)}

Events
Singles	Doubles
- Open de Oeiras

Hunter Reese and Sem Verbeek were the defending champions but chose not to defend their title.

Jesper de Jong and Tim van Rijthoven won the title after defeating Julian Lenz and Roberto Quiroz 6–1, 7–6^{(7–3)} in the final.

== Seeds ==
1. (United States) Evan King / (Portugal) Gonçalo Oliveira (quarterfinals)
2. (France) Sadio Doumbia / (France) Fabien Reboul (first round)
3. (Germany) Dustin Brown / (Austria) Tristan-Samuel Weissborn (quarterfinals)
4. (Poland) Karol Drzewiecki / (Spain) Sergio Martos Gornés (first round)

== Draw ==
Key

- Q = Qualifier
- WC = Wild card
- LL = Lucky loser
- Alt = Alternate
- ITF = ITF entry
- PR = Protected ranking
- SR = Special ranking
- SE = Special exempt
- JE = Junior exempt
- JR = Junior Accelerator Programme entrant
- CO = College Accelerator Programme entrant
- NG = Next Gen Accelerator Program entrant
- w/o = Walkover
- r = Retired
- d = Defaulted

First round
1	(United States) E King (Portugal) G Oliveira	5	7^{8}	[10]
(Spain) R Ortega Olmedo (Kazakhstan) D Yevseyev	7	6^{6}	[7]
(Argentina) P Cachin (Argentina) C Ugo Carabelli	6	6
(Italy) M Bortolotti (Croatia) V Galović	3	2
3	(Germany) D Brown (Austria) T-S Weissborn	6	6
(Peru) S Galdós (Bolivia) F Zeballos	4	1
(Netherlands) J de Jong (Netherlands) T van Rijthoven	6	6
(Chinese Taipei) C-h Tseng (Chinese Taipei) T-l Wu	2	1
(Italy) R Bonadio (Croatia) N Serdarušić	6	3	[11]
WC	(Portugal) Gonçalo Falcão (Portugal) Luís Faria	3	6	[9]
WC	(Portugal) N Borges (Portugal) F Cabral	7^{7}	6^{6}	[11]
4	(Poland) K Drzewiecki (Spain) S Martos Gornés	6^{4}	7^{8}	[9]
(United States) J Cerretani (Romania) VV Cornea	6	4	[4]
WC	(Portugal) Pedro Araújo (Portugal) Fábio Coelho	4	6	[10]
(Germany) J Lenz (Ecuador) R Quiroz	2	7^{7}	[10]
2	(France) S Doumbia (France) F Reboul	6	6^{5}	[3]

Quarterfinals
1	(United States) E King (Portugal) G Oliveira	6	1	[7]
(Argentina) P Cachin (Argentina) C Ugo Carabelli	4	6	[10]
3	(Germany) D Brown (Austria) T-S Weissborn	6	1	[10]
(Netherlands) J de Jong (Netherlands) T van Rijthoven	4	6	[12]
(Italy) R Bonadio (Croatia) N Serdarušić	2	2
WC	(Portugal) N Borges (Portugal) F Cabral	6	6
WC	(Portugal) P Araújo (Portugal) F Coelho	5	7	[9]
(Germany) J Lenz (Ecuador) R Quiroz	7	5	[11]

Semifinals
(Argentina) P Cachin (Argentina) C Ugo Carabelli	4	4
(Netherlands) J de Jong (Netherlands) T van Rijthoven	6	6
WC	(Portugal) N Borges (Portugal) F Cabral	6^{5}	2
(Germany) J Lenz (Ecuador) R Quiroz	7^{7}	6

Final
(Netherlands) J de Jong (Netherlands) T van Rijthoven	6	7^{7}
(Germany) J Lenz (Ecuador) R Quiroz	1	6^{3}
