= 2021 Open de Oeiras III =

- Date: 17–23 May
- Edition: 3rd
- Surface: Clay
- Location: Oeiras, Portugal

Champions

Singles
- (Spain) Carlos Alcaraz

Doubles
- (United States) Hunter Reese / (Netherlands) Sem Verbeek
← 2021 ·	Open de Oeiras	· 2021 →

The 2021 Open de Oeiras III was a professional tennis tournament played on clay courts. It was the third edition of the tournament which was part of the 2021 ATP Challenger Tour. It took place in Oeiras, Portugal between 17 and 23 May 2021.

== Singles main-draw entrants ==
=== Seeds ===
Country	Player	Rank^{1}	Seed
CZE	Jiří Veselý	73	1
USA	Steve Johnson	85	2
ARG	Federico Coria	91	3
ESP	Pedro Martínez	94	4
GER	Yannick Hanfmann	95	5
ARG	Juan Ignacio Londero	98	6
ARG	Facundo Bagnis	105	7
POR	Pedro Sousa	111	8

- ^{1} Rankings are as of 10 May 2021.

=== Other entrants ===
The following players received wildcards into the singles main draw:

- (Portugal) Nuno Borges
- (Portugal) João Domingues
- (Portugal) Gastão Elias

The following player received entry into the singles main draw as an alternate:

- (Portugal) Frederico Ferreira Silva

The following players received entry from the qualifying draw:

- (Belgium) Zizou Bergs
- (Ecuador) Emilio Gómez
- (France) Hugo Grenier
- (Slovakia) Alex Molčan

== Champions ==
=== Singles ===
- (Spain) Carlos Alcaraz def. (Argentina) Facundo Bagnis 6–4, 6–4.

=== Doubles ===
- (United States) Hunter Reese / (Netherlands) Sem Verbeek def. (France) Sadio Doumbia / (France) Fabien Reboul 4–6, 6–4, [10–7].
