= 2021 Open de Oeiras IV – Singles =

Singles
- 2021 Open de Oeiras IV

Final
- Champion: (Portugal) Gastão Elias
- Runner-up: (Denmark) Holger Rune
- Score: 5–7, 6–4, 6–4

Events
Singles	Doubles
- Open de Oeiras

Carlos Alcaraz was the defending champion but chose not to defend his title.

Gastão Elias won the title after defeating Holger Rune 5–7, 6–4, 6–4 in the final.

== Seeds ==
1. (France) Mathias Bourgue (first round)
2. (Chinese Taipei) Wu Tung-lin (second round)
3. (Germany) Julian Lenz (second round)
4. (Chinese Taipei) Tseng Chun-hsin (second round)
5. (Ecuador) Roberto Quiroz (first round)
6. (Spain) Carlos Gimeno Valero (quarterfinals)
7. (Argentina) Pedro Cachin (first round)
8. (Italy) Riccardo Bonadio (second round)

== Draw ==
Key

- Q = Qualifier
- WC = Wild card
- LL = Lucky loser
- Alt = Alternate
- ITF = ITF entry
- PR = Protected ranking
- SR = Special ranking
- SE = Special exempt
- JE = Junior exempt
- JR = Junior Accelerator Programme entrant
- CO = College Accelerator Programme entrant
- NG = Next Gen Accelerator Program entrant
- w/o = Walkover
- r = Retired
- d = Defaulted

=== Finals ===
Semifinals
(Portugal) Gastão Elias	4	7	0
(Portugal) Nuno Borges	6	5	0^{r}
(Denmark) Holger Rune	6	3	6
Q	(Kazakhstan) Timofey Skatov	2	6	2

Final
(Portugal) Gastão Elias	5	6	6
(Denmark) Holger Rune	7	4	4

=== Top half ===
First round
1	(France) M Bourgue	2	2
WC	(Portugal) Pedro Araújo	6	6
(Portugal) G Elias	6	6
WC	(Portugal) Luís Faria	2	3
(Argentina) C Ugo Carabelli	6	6
(Netherlands) J de Jong	4	2
(Czech Republic) J Forejtek	6^{4}	6	0
8	(Italy) R Bonadio	7^{7}	3	6
4	(Chinese Taipei) C-h Tseng	6	6
(Spain) R Ortega Olmedo	4	2
(Germany) J Härteis	3	0
Q	(Romania) FC Jianu	6	6
(Croatia) N Serdarušić	4	5
Q	(Kazakhstan) D Yevseyev	6	7
(Portugal) N Borges	6	6
5	(Ecuador) R Quiroz	3	0

Second round
WC	(Portugal) P Araújo	5	0
(Portugal) G Elias	7	6
(Argentina) C Ugo Carabelli	4	7	6
8	(Italy) R Bonadio	6	5	4
4	(Chinese Taipei) C-h Tseng	3	6	1
Q	(Romania) FC Jianu	6	3	6
Q	(Kazakhstan) D Yevseyev	7^{7}	4	2
(Portugal) N Borges	6^{2}	6	6

Quarterfinals
(Portugal) G Elias	6^{0}	6	6
(Argentina) C Ugo Carabelli	7^{7}	3	0
Q	(Romania) FC Jianu	4	4
(Portugal) N Borges	6	6

Semifinals
(Portugal) G Elias	4	7	0
(Portugal) N Borges	6	5	0^{r}

=== Bottom half ===
First round
6	(Spain) C Gimeno Valero	6	6
(Ukraine) V Sachko	2	1
PR	(Croatia) V Galović	4	7^{7}	6
(Croatia) D Ajduković	6	6^{4}	1
(Denmark) H Rune	6	6
(Netherlands) T van Rijthoven	3	4
Alt	(France) C Denolly	4	0
3	(Germany) J Lenz	6	6
7	(Argentina) P Cachin	4	7	6^{1}
(Portugal) G Oliveira	6	5	7^{7}
(Netherlands) I Sijsling	6	2	6^{4}
Q	(Kazakhstan) T Skatov	2	6	7^{7}
(France) G Blancaneaux	3	2
Q	(Spain) N Sánchez Izquierdo	6	6
WC	(Portugal) T Cação	1	1
2	(Chinese Taipei) T-l Wu	6	6

Second round
6	(Spain) C Gimeno Valero	6	6
PR	(Croatia) V Galović	4	2
(Denmark) H Rune	5	6	6
3	(Germany) J Lenz	7	4	3
(Portugal) G Oliveira	3	1
Q	(Kazakhstan) T Skatov	6	6
Q	(Spain) N Sánchez Izquierdo	6	7^{7}
2	(Chinese Taipei) T-l Wu	2	6^{2}

Quarterfinals
6	(Spain) C Gimeno Valero	2	4
(Denmark) H Rune	6	6
Q	(Kazakhstan) T Skatov	7^{7}	5	6
Q	(Spain) N Sánchez Izquierdo	6^{4}	7	1

Semifinals
(Denmark) H Rune	6	3	6
Q	(Kazakhstan) T Skatov	2	6	2
