= 2021 Barcelona Open Banc Sabadell – Singles =

Singles
- 2021 Barcelona Open Banc Sabadell

Final
- Champion: (Spain) Rafael Nadal
- Runner-up: (Greece) Stefanos Tsitsipas
- Score: 6–4, 6–7^{(6–8)}, 7–5

Details
- Draw: 48 (6 Q / 4 WC )
- Seeds: 16

Events
Singles	Doubles
← 2019 ·	Barcelona Open Banc Sabadell	· 2022 →

Rafael Nadal defeated Stefanos Tsitsipas in the final, 6–4, 6–7^{(6–8)}, 7–5 to win the singles title at the 2021 Barcelona Open. Nadal saved a championship point en route to his record-extending 12th Barcelona Open title and 61st ATP Tour singles title on clay. It became the second tournament at which Nadal had earned 12 or more victories, after the French Open. At three hours and 38 minutes, the final match was at the time the longest best-of-three-sets tour-level final since the ATP began tracking statistics in 1991, until the 2023 Cincinnati Masters final. Tsitsipas, who had also lost to Nadal in his first career ATP singles final at this tournament in 2018, was in contention to win his first ATP 500 tournament title on his seventh attempt.

Dominic Thiem was the reigning champion from when the tournament was last held in 2019, but he did not return to compete.

== Seeds ==
All seeds receive a bye into the second round.

1. (Spain) Rafael Nadal (champion)
2. (Greece) Stefanos Tsitsipas (final)
3. (Russia) Andrey Rublev (quarterfinals)
4. (Argentina) Diego Schwartzman (quarterfinals)
5. (Spain) Roberto Bautista Agut (third round)
6. (Spain) Pablo Carreño Busta (semifinals)
7. (Canada) Denis Shapovalov (third round)
8. (Belgium) David Goffin (third round, retired)
9. (Italy) Fabio Fognini (second round, defaulted)
10. (Canada) Félix Auger-Aliassime (quarterfinals)
11. (Italy) Jannik Sinner (semifinals)
12. (Russia) Karen Khachanov (second round)
13. (Chile) Cristian Garín (second round)
14. (Australia) Alex de Minaur (third round)
15. (Norway) Casper Ruud (withdrew)
16. (United Kingdom) Dan Evans (second round)
17. (France) Adrian Mannarino (second round)

Click on the seed number of a player to go to their draw section.

== Draw ==
=== Key ===
- Q = Qualifier
- WC = Wild card
- LL = Lucky loser
- Alt = Alternate
- SE = Special exempt
- PR = Protected ranking
- ITF = ITF entry
- JE = Junior exempt
- w/o = Walkover
- r = Retired
- d = Defaulted
- SR = Special ranking

=== Finals ===
Quarterfinals
1	(Spain) Rafael Nadal	6	6
(United Kingdom) Cameron Norrie	1	4
4	(Argentina) Diego Schwartzman	4	6	5
6	(Spain) Pablo Carreño Busta	6	3	7
11	(Italy) Jannik Sinner	6	7^{8}
3/WC	(Russia) Andrey Rublev	2	6^{6}
10	(Canada) Félix Auger-Aliassime	3	3
2	(Greece) Stefanos Tsitsipas	6	6

Semifinals
1	(Spain) Rafael Nadal	6	6
6	(Spain) Pablo Carreño Busta	3	2
11	(Italy) Jannik Sinner	3	3
2	(Greece) Stefanos Tsitsipas	6	6

Final
1	(Spain) Rafael Nadal	6	6^{6}	7
2	(Greece) Stefanos Tsitsipas	4	7^{8}	5

=== Top half ===
==== Section 1 ====
First round
Q	(Belarus) I Ivashka	6	6
Q	(Netherlands) T Griekspoor	3	1
(Japan) K Nishikori	4	7^{7}	6
(Argentina) G Pella	6	6^{4}	2
(United Kingdom) C Norrie	6	6
(Italy) S Caruso	1	2
Q	(India) S Nagal	5	0
(France) P-H Herbert	7	6

Second round
1	(Spain) R Nadal	3	6	6
Q	(Belarus) I Ivashka	6	2	4
(Japan) K Nishikori	7^{7}	4	6
13	(Chile) C Garín	6^{5}	6	1
12	(Russia) K Khachanov	4	6	3
(United Kingdom) C Norrie	6	3	6
(France) P-H Herbert	2	4
8	(Belgium) D Goffin	6	6

Third round
1	(Spain) R Nadal	6	2	6
(Japan) K Nishikori	0	6	2
(United Kingdom) C Norrie	6	3
8	(Belgium) D Goffin	0	5^{r}

Quarterfinals
1	(Spain) R Nadal	6	6
(United Kingdom) C Norrie	1	4

==== Section 2 ====
First round
WC	(Spain) C Alcaraz	4	6^{2}
(United States) F Tiafoe	6	7^{7}
(Germany) D Koepfer	5	2
(France) C Moutet	7	6
Q	(Spain) B Zapata Miralles	6^{4}	7	6
Q	(Russia) A Kuznetsov	7^{7}	5	1
(Australia) J Thompson	7^{7}	4	7^{7}
(France) R Gasquet	6^{5}	6	6^{3}

Second round
4	(Argentina) D Schwartzman	3	7	6
(United States) F Tiafoe	6	5	1
(France) C Moutet	6	5	6
16	(United Kingdom) D Evans	4	7	3
9	(Italy) F Fognini	0	4^{d}
Q	(Spain) B Zapata Miralles	6	4
(Australia) J Thompson	4	0
6	(Spain) P Carreño Busta	6	6

Third round
4	(Argentina) D Schwartzman	6	6
(France) C Moutet	4	2
Q	(Spain) B Zapata Miralles	3	4
6	(Spain) P Carreño Busta	6	6

Quarterfinals
4	(Argentina) D Schwartzman	4	6	5
6	(Spain) P Carreño Busta	6	3	7

=== Bottom half ===
==== Section 3 ====
First round
(France) G Simon	1	6	3
(Spain) P Andújar	6	3	6
(France) J-W Tsonga	5	1
(Belarus) E Gerasimov	7	6
(Spain) A Ramos Viñolas	6^{2}	6	7^{7}
Q	(Denmark) H Rune	7^{7}	1	6^{2}
(France) B Paire	5	3
LL	(Italy) F Gaio	7	6

Second round
5	(Spain) R Bautista Agut	6	6
(Spain) P Andújar	4	0
(Belarus) E Gerasimov	3	2
11	(Italy) J Sinner	6	6
17	(France) A Mannarino	4	4
(Spain) A Ramos Viñolas	6	6
LL	(Italy) F Gaio	4	3
3/WC	(Russia) A Rublev	6	6

Third round
5	(Spain) R Bautista Agut	6^{9}	2
11	(Italy) J Sinner	7^{11}	6
(Spain) A Ramos Viñolas	4	7^{7}	4
3/WC	(Russia) A Rublev	6	6^{4}	6

Quarterfinals
11	(Italy) J Sinner	6	7^{8}
3/WC	(Russia) A Rublev	2	6^{6}

==== Section 4 ====
First round
(France) J Chardy	6	3	6
(Georgia (country)) N Basilashvili	4	6	3
(Spain) F López	4	3
WC	(Italy) L Musetti	6	6
(Spain) A Davidovich Fokina	6	5	2
(Kazakhstan) A Bublik	2	7	6
(Brazil) T Monteiro	3	5
WC	(Spain) J Munar	6	7

Second round
7	(Canada) D Shapovalov	6	7
(France) J Chardy	3	5
WC	(Italy) L Musetti	6	3	0
10	(Canada) F Auger-Aliassime	4	6	6
14	(Australia) A de Minaur	7^{7}	6
(Kazakhstan) A Bublik	6^{3}	2
WC	(Spain) J Munar	0	2
2	(Greece) S Tsitsipas	6	6

Third round
7	(Canada) D Shapovalov	2	3
10	(Canada) F Auger-Aliassime	6	6
14	(Australia) A de Minaur	5	3
2	(Greece) S Tsitsipas	7	6

Quarterfinals
10	(Canada) F Auger-Aliassime	3	3
2	(Greece) S Tsitsipas	6	6

== Qualifying ==
=== Seeds ===
1. (United States) Tennys Sandgren (first round)
2. (Sweden) Mikael Ymer (first round)
3. (Spain) Pedro Martínez (withdrew due to illness)
4. (Kazakhstan) Mikhail Kukushkin (first round)
5. (Austria) Dennis Novak (first round)
6. (Belarus) Ilya Ivashka (qualified)
7. (Germany) Peter Gojowczyk (qualifying competition)
8. (France) Antoine Hoang (first round)
9. (India) Sumit Nagal (qualified)
10. (Italy) Federico Gaio (qualifying competition, lucky loser)
11. (Austria) Jurij Rodionov (first round)
12. (Switzerland) Henri Laaksonen (first round)

=== Qualifiers ===
1. (Spain) Bernabé Zapata Miralles
2. (Denmark) Holger Rune
3. (India) Sumit Nagal
4. (Netherlands) Tallon Griekspoor
5. (Russia) Andrey Kuznetsov
6. (Belarus) Ilya Ivashka

=== Lucky loser ===
1. (Italy) Federico Gaio

=== Qualifying draw ===
==== First qualifier ====
First round
1	(United States) Tennys Sandgren	6	2	3
(Spain) Bernabé Zapata Miralles	2	6	6
WC	(Argentina) Pedro Cachin	6	5	6
12	(Switzerland) Henri Laaksonen	3	7	4

Qualifying competition
(Spain) Bernabé Zapata Miralles	7	6
WC	(Argentina) Pedro Cachin	5	3

==== Second qualifier ====
First round
2	(Sweden) Mikael Ymer	0	2
WC	(Denmark) Holger Rune	6	6
(Egypt) Mohamed Safwat	4	0
7	(Germany) Peter Gojowczyk	6	6

Qualifying competition
WC	(Denmark) Holger Rune	3	6	7
7	(Germany) Peter Gojowczyk	6	3	5

==== Third qualifier ====
First round
Alt	(Italy) Thomas Fabbiano	6	6
(Switzerland) Marc-Andrea Hüsler	3	1
(Ukraine) Illya Marchenko	6	2	5
9	(India) Sumit Nagal	3	6	7

Qualifying competition
Alt	(Italy) Thomas Fabbiano	6^{1}	3
9	(India) Sumit Nagal	7^{7}	6

==== Fourth qualifier ====
First round
4	(Kazakhstan) Mikhail Kukushkin	1	2
WC	(Spain) Carlos Gimeno Valero	6	6
(Netherlands) Tallon Griekspoor	6	7
11	(Austria) Jurij Rodionov	4	5

Qualifying competition
WC	(Spain) Carlos Gimeno Valero	7^{7}	6^{4}	3
(Netherlands) Tallon Griekspoor	6^{4}	7^{7}	6

==== Fifth qualifier ====
First round
5	(Austria) Dennis Novak	1	6^{2}
(Netherlands) Botic van de Zandschulp	6	7^{7}
PR	(Russia) Andrey Kuznetsov	6	5	7^{8}
8	(France) Antoine Hoang	0	7	6^{6}

Qualifying competition
(Netherlands) Botic van de Zandschulp	3	2
PR	(Russia) Andrey Kuznetsov	6	6

==== Sixth qualifier ====
First round
6	(Belarus) Ilya Ivashka	6	6
(United States) Maxime Cressy	1	3
WC	(Spain) Tommy Robredo	6^{3}	4
10	(Italy) Federico Gaio	7^{7}	6

Qualifying competition
6	(Belarus) Ilya Ivashka	6	6
10	(Italy) Federico Gaio	3	2
