= 2015 US Open – Men's singles qualifying =

Men's singles qualifying
- 2015 US Open

Events
Singles	men	women		boys	girls
Doubles	men	women	mixed	boys	girls
WC Singles	men	women	quad
WC Doubles	men	women	quad
Legends	men	women	mixed

Qualification
Singles	men	women
- US Open

== Seeds ==
1. (France) Paul-Henri Mathieu (qualified)
2. (Germany) Alexander Zverev (qualified)
3. (Argentina) Guido Pella (qualified)
4. (Japan) Tatsuma Ito (first round)
5. (Georgia (country)) Nikoloz Basilashvili (qualified)
6. (United Kingdom) Kyle Edmund (qualifying competition)
7. (Belgium) Kimmer Coppejans (qualifying competition)
8. (Serbia) Dušan Lajović (first round)
9. (Japan) Taro Daniel (qualifying competition)
10. (Japan) Go Soeda (first round)
11. (Spain) Íñigo Cervantes (second round)
12. (Spain) Nicolás Almagro (second round)
13. (Germany) Jan-Lennard Struff (second round)
14. (Germany) Matthias Bachinger (first round)
15. (Colombia) Alejandro González (qualified)
16. (Ukraine) Illya Marchenko (qualified)
17. (Germany) Michael Berrer (qualified)
18. (Australia) John-Patrick Smith (qualified)
19. (Italy) Luca Vanni (second round)
20. (Slovakia) Norbert Gombos (second round)
21. (Spain) Albert Montañés (qualifying competition)
22. (Colombia) Alejandro Falla (qualifying competition)
23. (Japan) Yoshihito Nishioka (qualified)
24. (Slovenia) Blaž Rola (first round)
25. (Brazil) André Ghem (first round)
26. (Australia) Matthew Ebden (qualified)
27. (Austria) Jürgen Melzer (qualified)
28. (Spain) Adrián Menéndez-Maceiras (qualifying competition)
29. (Croatia) Ivan Dodig (qualifying competition)
30. (Argentina) Facundo Bagnis (qualifying competition)
31. (Russia) Evgeny Donskoy (qualified)
32. (Argentina) Facundo Argüello (first round)

== Qualifiers ==
1. (France) Paul-Henri Mathieu
2. (Germany) Alexander Zverev
3. (Argentina) Guido Pella
4. (Germany) Michael Berrer
5. (Georgia (country)) Nikoloz Basilashvili
6. (Japan) Yoshihito Nishioka
7. (Austria) Jürgen Melzer
8. (Australia) Matthew Ebden
9. (Russia) Evgeny Donskoy
10. (Russia) Andrey Rublev
11. (United States) Tommy Paul
12. (Australia) John-Patrick Smith
13. (Sweden) Elias Ymer
14. (Russia) Konstantin Kravchuk
15. (Colombia) Alejandro González
16. (Ukraine) Illya Marchenko

== Draw ==
Key

- Q = Qualifier
- WC = Wild card
- LL = Lucky loser
- Alt = Alternate
- ITF = ITF entry
- PR = Protected ranking
- SR = Special ranking
- SE = Special exempt
- JE = Junior exempt
- JR = Junior Accelerator Programme entrant
- CO = College Accelerator Programme entrant
- NG = Next Gen Accelerator Program entrant
- w/o = Walkover
- r = Retired
- d = Defaulted

=== First qualifier ===
First round
1	(France) Paul-Henri Mathieu	6	7^{7}
(Italy) Matteo Donati	3	6^{3}
(Chinese Taipei) Chen Ti	6^{5}	2
(Germany) Tobias Kamke	7^{7}	6
(Kazakhstan) Andrey Golubev	7^{7}	7^{7}
(France) Enzo Couacaud	6^{5}	6^{4}
(Ecuador) Giovanni Lapentti	1	0
22	(Colombia) Alejandro Falla	6	6

Second round
1	(France) Paul-Henri Mathieu	6	6
(Germany) Tobias Kamke	1	2
(Kazakhstan) Andrey Golubev	2	6	5
22	(Colombia) Alejandro Falla	6	3	7

Qualifying competition
1	(France) Paul-Henri Mathieu	6	3	6
22	(Colombia) Alejandro Falla	2	6	1

=== Second qualifier ===
First round
2	(Germany) Alexander Zverev	6	6
(Argentina) Horacio Zeballos	1	4
(Belgium) Maxime Authom	1	0^{r}
(Germany) Nils Langer	6	1
(Russia) Karen Khachanov	6	3	6
(Australia) Luke Saville	4	6	1
(Italy) Matteo Viola	4	1
29	(Croatia) Ivan Dodig	6	6

Second round
2	(Germany) Alexander Zverev	6	6^{11}	6
(Germany) Nils Langer	4	7^{13}	3
(Russia) Karen Khachanov	3	4
29	(Croatia) Ivan Dodig	6	6

Qualifying competition
2	(Germany) Alexander Zverev	7^{7}	7
29	(Croatia) Ivan Dodig	6^{4}	5

=== Third qualifier ===
First round
3	(Argentina) Guido Pella	6	6
(Germany) Andreas Beck	3	4
(Chinese Taipei) Huang Liang-chi	2	5
WC	(United States) Noah Rubin	6	7
(France) Mathias Bourgue	6	6^{3}	6
(Serbia) Laslo Djere	3	7^{7}	4
(India) Somdev Devvarman	7	5	1
20	(Slovakia) Norbert Gombos	5	7	6

Second round
3	(Argentina) Guido Pella	6	7^{8}
WC	(United States) Noah Rubin	4	6^{6}
(France) Mathias Bourgue	6	6
20	(Slovakia) Norbert Gombos	2	4

Qualifying competition
3	(Argentina) Guido Pella	6	6
(France) Mathias Bourgue	3	4

=== Fourth qualifier ===
First round
4	(Japan) Tatsuma Ito	3	5
(Russia) Aslan Karatsev	6	7
(United States) Alexander Sarkissian	6	4	3
(Czech Republic) Jan Mertl	4	6	6
(Argentina) Nicolás Kicker	6	7^{7}
(Czech Republic) Adam Pavlásek	1	6^{5}
(Uzbekistan) Farrukh Dustov	6^{3}	6	4
17	(Germany) Michael Berrer	7^{7}	4	6

Second round
(Russia) Aslan Karatsev	6	6^{1}	6
(Czech Republic) Jan Mertl	3	7^{7}	0
(Argentina) Nicolás Kicker	4	2
17	(Germany) Michael Berrer	6	6

Qualifying competition
(Russia) Aslan Karatsev	1	3
17	(Germany) Michael Berrer	6	6

=== Fifth qualifier ===
First round
5	(Georgia (country)) Nikoloz Basilashvili	6	6
(Spain) Oriol Roca Batalla	2	4
WC	(United States) Mitchell Krueger	6	6
(Belgium) Niels Desein	1	2
(France) Maxime Hamou	2	4
(Belgium) Germain Gigounon	6	6
(Italy) Thomas Fabbiano	6	7
32	(Argentina) Facundo Argüello	2	5

Second round
5	(Georgia (country)) Nikoloz Basilashvili	4	6	6
WC	(United States) Mitchell Krueger	6	2	3
(Belgium) Germain Gigounon	6	1	1
(Italy) Thomas Fabbiano	4	6	6

Qualifying competition
5	(Georgia (country)) Nikoloz Basilashvili	6	4	6
(Italy) Thomas Fabbiano	4	6	1

=== Sixth qualifier ===
First round
6	(United Kingdom) Kyle Edmund	6	6
PR	(Canada) Peter Polansky	3	4
WC	(United States) Stefan Kozlov	2	7	3
(Argentina) Guido Andreozzi	6	5	6
(United States) Daniel Nguyen	7^{9}	2	6
(Canada) Philip Bester	6^{7}	6	4
(India) Yuki Bhambri	4	6	2
23	(Japan) Yoshihito Nishioka	6	1	6

Second round
6	(United Kingdom) Kyle Edmund	6	6
(Argentina) Guido Andreozzi	3	4
(United States) Daniel Nguyen	2	6	2
23	(Japan) Yoshihito Nishioka	6	2	6

Qualifying competition
6	(United Kingdom) Kyle Edmund	2	6	5
23	(Japan) Yoshihito Nishioka	6	0	7

=== Seventh qualifier ===
First round
7	(Belgium) Kimmer Coppejans	6	3	6
PR	(Croatia) Ante Pavić	4	6	3
(Sweden) Christian Lindell	6^{2}	4
WC	(United States) Reilly Opelka	7^{7}	6
(Chile) Nicolás Jarry	1	4
(Russia) Alexander Kudryavtsev	6	6
(Czech Republic) Jaroslav Pospíšil	5	2
27	(Austria) Jürgen Melzer	7	6

Second round
7	(Belgium) Kimmer Coppejans	6	6
WC	(United States) Reilly Opelka	4	2
(Russia) Alexander Kudryavtsev	4	7^{7}	4
27	(Austria) Jürgen Melzer	6	6^{5}	6

Qualifying competition
7	(Belgium) Kimmer Coppejans	6	3	3
27	(Austria) Jürgen Melzer	4	6	6

=== Eighth qualifier ===
First round
8	(Serbia) Dušan Lajović	6	1	2
(United Kingdom) Brydan Klein	4	6	6
(France) Tristan Lamasine	6^{3}	7	6
(China) Zhang Ze	7^{7}	5	1
(Portugal) Gastão Elias	7^{7}	3	4
(United States) Dennis Novikov	6^{3}	6	6
WC	(United States) Michael Mmoh	3	2
26	(Australia) Matthew Ebden	6	6

Second round
(United Kingdom) Brydan Klein	6	6
(France) Tristan Lamasine	3	2
(United States) Dennis Novikov	3	7^{7}	2
26	(Australia) Matthew Ebden	6	6^{3}	6

Qualifying competition
(United Kingdom) Brydan Klein	3	3
26	(Australia) Matthew Ebden	6	6

=== Ninth qualifier ===
First round
9	(Japan) Taro Daniel	6	6
(Argentina) Renzo Olivo	2	4
(France) Calvin Hemery	4	7^{7}	1
(Bosnia and Herzegovina) Mirza Bašić	6	6^{2}	6
(Chinese Taipei) Jason Jung	1	5
(Belarus) Uladzimir Ignatik	6	7
(Netherlands) Thiemo de Bakker	5	5
31	(Russia) Evgeny Donskoy	7	7

Second round
9	(Japan) Taro Daniel	7^{7}	6
(Bosnia and Herzegovina) Mirza Bašić	6^{2}	1
(Belarus) Uladzimir Ignatik	6	2	3
31	(Russia) Evgeny Donskoy	3	6	6

Qualifying competition
9	(Japan) Taro Daniel	3	2
31	(Russia) Evgeny Donskoy	6	6

=== Tenth qualifier ===
First round
10	(Japan) Go Soeda	2	3
(Russia) Andrey Rublev	6	6
(Austria) Gerald Melzer	5	4
(Japan) Yūichi Sugita	7	6
(Germany) Peter Gojowczyk	4	6	6
(Japan) Yasutaka Uchiyama	6	4	2
(Hungary) Márton Fucsovics	6	6
25	(Brazil) André Ghem	2	2

Second round
(Russia) Andrey Rublev	6	6
(Japan) Yūichi Sugita	3	4
(Germany) Peter Gojowczyk	6	6
(Hungary) Márton Fucsovics	2	0

Qualifying competition
(Russia) Andrey Rublev	7	2	6
(Germany) Peter Gojowczyk	5	6	4

=== Eleventh qualifier ===
First round
11	(Spain) Iñigo Cervantes	4	6	7
(United Kingdom) Liam Broady	6	4	5
(Italy) Gianluca Naso	3	4
PR	(Switzerland) Marco Chiudinelli	6	6
(Dominican Republic) José Hernández-Fernández	7^{7}	6
(France) Jonathan Eysseric	6^{4}	1
WC	(United States) Tommy Paul	6	4	6
24	(Slovenia) Blaž Rola	3	6	4

Second round
11	(Spain) Iñigo Cervantes	3	2
PR	(Switzerland) Marco Chiudinelli	6	6
(Dominican Republic) José Hernández-Fernández	3	5
WC	(United States) Tommy Paul	6	7

Qualifying competition
PR	(Switzerland) Marco Chiudinelli	1	4
WC	(United States) Tommy Paul	6	6

=== Twelfth qualifier ===
First round
12	(Spain) Nicolás Almagro	7^{7}	6
(Netherlands) Igor Sijsling	6^{5}	3
PR	(Israel) Amir Weintraub	6	4	3
(Brazil) Guilherme Clezar	3	6	6
(Bosnia and Herzegovina) Aldin Šetkić	1	1
(France) Vincent Millot	6	6
WC	(United States) Jesse Witten	6^{5}	1
18	(Australia) John-Patrick Smith	7^{7}	6

Second round
12	(Spain) Nicolás Almagro	6^{7}	6	4
(Brazil) Guilherme Clezar	7^{9}	4	6
(France) Vincent Millot	5	2
18	(Australia) John-Patrick Smith	7	6

Qualifying competition
(Brazil) Guilherme Clezar	3	2
18	(Australia) John-Patrick Smith	6	6

=== Thirteenth qualifier ===
First round
13	(Germany) Jan-Lennard Struff	4	6	6
(India) Saketh Myneni	6	4	1
(Sweden) Elias Ymer	6	6
(Czech Republic) Jan Šátral	2	1
(Bosnia and Herzegovina) Tomislav Brkić	3	3
(Poland) Michał Przysiężny	6	6
(Spain) Jordi Samper-Montaña	4	0^{r}
21	(Spain) Albert Montañés	6	0

Second round
13	(Germany) Jan-Lennard Struff	2	6	6^{5}
(Sweden) Elias Ymer	6	4	7^{7}
(Poland) Michał Przysiężny	2	6^{6}
21	(Spain) Albert Montañés	6	7^{8}

Qualifying competition
(Sweden) Elias Ymer	7	6
21	(Spain) Albert Montañés	5	4

=== Fourteenth qualifier ===
First round
14	(Germany) Matthias Bachinger	2	4
(Russia) Konstantin Kravchuk	6	6
(Barbados) Darian King	6	3	6^{4}
(Estonia) Jürgen Zopp	2	6	7^{7}
(Argentina) Máximo González	6	6
(United States) Jarmere Jenkins	2	4
WC	(United States) Taylor Harry Fritz	3	3
19	(Italy) Luca Vanni	6	6

Second round
(Russia) Konstantin Kravchuk	6	3	7^{7}
(Estonia) Jürgen Zopp	2	6	6^{3}
(Argentina) Máximo González	6	5	6
19	(Italy) Luca Vanni	3	7	2

Qualifying competition
(Russia) Konstantin Kravchuk	6	3	6
(Argentina) Máximo González	3	6	2

=== Fifteenth qualifier ===
First round
15	(Colombia) Alejandro González	7^{7}	6
WC	(United States) Marcos Giron	6^{1}	2
(France) Édouard Roger-Vasselin	2	6	4
(Romania) Marius Copil	6	4	6
PR	(Portugal) Pedro Sousa	2	3
(India) Ramkumar Ramanathan	6	6
(Australia) Jason Kubler	6^{5}	2
30	(Argentina) Facundo Bagnis	7^{7}	6

Second round
15	(Colombia) Alejandro González	7	6
(Romania) Marius Copil	5	3
(India) Ramkumar Ramanathan	3	6	6^{4}
30	(Argentina) Facundo Bagnis	6	2	7^{7}

Qualifying competition
15	(Colombia) Alejandro González	6	6
30	(Argentina) Facundo Bagnis	4	3

=== Sixteenth qualifier ===
First round
16	(Ukraine) Illya Marchenko	7^{7}	6
(Japan) Hiroki Moriya	6^{3}	1
(France) David Guez	6	6
(Slovakia) Jozef Kovalík	4	4
(Italy) Andrea Arnaboldi	6	6
(Belgium) Yannick Mertens	3	4
(Belarus) Dzmitry Zhyrmont	2	2
28	(Spain) Adrián Menéndez-Maceiras	6	6

Second round
16	(Ukraine) Illya Marchenko	6	7^{7}
(France) David Guez	2	6^{4}
(Italy) Andrea Arnaboldi	4	6	6^{5}
28	(Spain) Adrián Menéndez-Maceiras	6	2	7^{7}

Qualifying competition
16	(Ukraine) Illya Marchenko	4	6	6
28	(Spain) Adrián Menéndez-Maceiras	6	3	4
