= 2022 Gran Canaria Challenger =

- Date: 28 February – 6 March
- Edition: 3rd
- Surface: Clay
- Location: Las Palmas, Spain

Champions

Singles
- (Italy) Gianluca Mager

Doubles
- (France) Sadio Doumbia / (France) Fabien Reboul
- Gran Canaria Challenger

The 2022 Gran Canaria Challenger was a professional tennis tournament played on clay courts. It was the third edition of the tournament which was part of the 2022 ATP Challenger Tour. It took place in Las Palmas, Spain between 28 February and 6 March 2022.

== Singles main-draw entrants ==
=== Seeds ===
Country	Player	Rank^{1}	Seed
ESP	Roberto Carballés Baena	81	1
ITA	Gianluca Mager	102	2
SVK	Andrej Martin	128	3
ITA	Salvatore Caruso	153	4
ITA	Alessandro Giannessi	187	5
ITA	Gian Marco Moroni	188	6
ITA	Federico Gaio	192	7
ITA	Lorenzo Giustino	214	8

- ^{1} Rankings as of 21 February 2022.

=== Other entrants ===
The following players received wildcards into the singles main draw:

- (Spain) Roberto Carballés Baena
- (Spain) Pablo Llamas Ruiz
- (Spain) Pol Martín Tiffon

The following players received entry from the qualifying draw:

- (Spain) Miguel Damas
- (Spain) Carlos López Montagud
- (Switzerland) Johan Nikles
- (France) Matthieu Perchicot
- (Spain) Oriol Roca Batalla
- (Spain) Pol Toledo Bagué

== Champions ==
=== Singles ===
- (Italy) Gianluca Mager def. (Spain) Roberto Carballés Baena 7–6^{(8–6)}, 6–2.

=== Doubles ===
- (France) Sadio Doumbia / (France) Fabien Reboul def. (Italy) Matteo Arnaldi / (Italy) Luciano Darderi 5–7, 6–4, [10–7].
