= Kimmer Coppejans =

Belgian tennis player

- Coppejans at the 2026 Wimbledon Championships
- Country (sports): Belgium
- Born: 7 February 1994 (age 32) Ostend, Belgium
- Height: 1.78 m (5 ft 10 in)
- Turned pro: 2012
- Plays: Right-handed (two-handed backhand)
- Coach: Michael Lynch, Carl Maes, Alexander Kneepkens, Niels Desein
- Prize money: US $1,634,222

Singles
- Career record: 4–18
- Career titles: 0
- Highest ranking: No. 97 (22 June 2015)
- Current ranking: No. 221 (16 November 2026)

Grand Slam singles results
- Australian Open: 1R (2021)
- French Open: 1R (2015, 2019)
- Wimbledon: 1R (2023)
- US Open: Q3 (2015, 2019, 2023, 2025)

Doubles
- Career record: 1–3
- Career titles: 0
- Highest ranking: No. 235 (22 March 2021)
- Current ranking: No. 725 (16 November 2026)

Team competitions
- Davis Cup: F (2015)
- Last updated on: 30 November 2026.

Kimmer Coppejans (born 7 February 1994) is a Belgian tennis player. He has a career-high ATP singles ranking is world No. 97, achieved on 22 June 2015 and a doubles ranking of No. 235 acchieved on 22 March 2021. Coppejans competes mainly on the ATP Challenger Tour.

== Career ==
Coppejans was the Junior Champion at the 2012 French Open, defeating Filip Peliwo of Canada in the final.

Coppejans qualified for the 2023 Wimbledon Championships making his debut at this Major. He lost to Alex de Minaur in the first round.

In December 2025 he was selected as the 2026 United Cup team Belgium second-ranked player. Coppejans made his Masters debut at the 2026 Rolex Shanghai Masters after qualifying for the main draw.

== Performance timeline ==
Key
W	F	SF	QF	#R	RR	Q#	DNQ	A	NH

(W) winner; (F) finalist; (SF) semifinalist; (QF) quarterfinalist; (#R) rounds 4, 3, 2, 1; (RR) round-robin stage; (Q#) qualification round; (DNQ) did not qualify; (A) absent; (NH) not held; (SR) strike rate (events won / competed); (W–L) win–loss record.
To avoid confusion and double counting, these charts are updated at the conclusion of a tournament or when the player's participation has ended.

=== Singles ===
Tournament	2014	2015	2016	2017	...	2019	2020	2021	2022	2023	2024	2025	2026	SR	W–L
Grand Slam tournaments
Australian Open	Q1	Q1	Q2	Q2	A	Q3	Q3	1R	Q1	Q1	Q2	Q3	Q3	0 / 1	0–1
French Open	Q3	1R	Q2	Q1	A	1R	Q3	Q3	A	Q1	A	Q2	Q1	0 / 2	0–2
Wimbledon	A	Q1	A	Q1	A	Q1	NH	Q1	A	1R	A	A	Q2	0 / 1	0–1
US Open	Q1	Q3	Q1	A	A	Q3	A	Q1	A	Q3	Q1	Q3	Q1	0 / 0	0–0
Win–loss	0–0	0–1	0–0	0–0	0–0	0–1	0–0	0–1	0–0	0–1	0–0	0–0	0–0	0 / 4	0–4
ATP Masters 1000
Indian Wells											A	A	A	0 / 0	0–0
Madrid Open										Q1	A	A	A	0 / 0	0–0
Shanghai Masters													1R	0 / 1	0–1
Win–loss										0–0	0–0	0–0	0–1	0 / 1	0–1

== ATP Challenger and ITF Tour finals ==
=== Singles: 32 (17–15) ===
Legend (singles) ATP Challenger Tour (6–9) ITF Futures Tour (11–6)	Titles by surface Hard (7–4) Clay (10–11)

Result	W–L	Date	Tournament	Tier	Surface	Opponent	Score
Loss	0–1	Aug 2012	Belgium F6, Oostende	Futures	Clay	(Belgium) Yannik Reuter	3–6, 1–6
Loss	0–2	Apr 2013	Greece F4, Heraklion	Futures	Hard	(Belgium) Germain Gigounon	3–6, 5–7
Win	1–2	Jun 2013	Belgium F2, Havré	Futures	Clay	(Netherlands) Boy Westerhof	7–6^{(7–4)}, 6–1
Win	2–2	Jul 2013	Belgium F5, Middelkerke	Futures	Hard	(Belgium) Yannik Reuter	6–2, 6–2
Win	3–2	Jul 2013	Belgium F6, Heist	Futures	Clay	(Belgium) Julien Cagnina	7–6^{(7–3)}, 4–6, 6–1
Win	4–2	Aug 2013	Belgium F7, Oostende	Futures	Clay	(Belgium) Yannick Mertens	6–7^{(6–8)}, 6–1, 6–2
Win	5–2	Feb 2014	Turkey F4, Antalya	Futures	Hard	(France) Enzo Couacaud	7–5, 6–2
Loss	5–3	Mar 2014	Turkey F6, Antalya	Futures	Hard	(Bosnia and Herzegovina) Aldin Šetkić	3–6, 2–6
Loss	5–4	Jun 2014	Netherlands F3, Breda	Futures	Clay	(Australia) Jason Kubler	3–6, 7–6^{(8–6)}, 3–6
Win	6–4	Sep 2014	Meknes, Morocco	Challenger	Clay	(France) Lucas Pouille	4–6, 6–2, 6–2
Win	7–4	Mar 2015	Guangzhou, China, P.R.	Challenger	Hard	(Italy) Roberto Marcora	7–6^{(8–6)}, 5–7, 6–1
Win	8–4	Apr 2015	Mersin, Turkey	Challenger	Clay	(Turkey) Marsel İlhan	6–2, 6–2
Loss	8–5	May 2015	Turin, Italy	Challenger	Clay	(Italy) Marco Cecchinato	2–6, 3–6
Loss	8–6	Oct 2015	São Paulo, Brazil	Challenger	Clay	(Argentina) Carlos Berlocq	3–6, 1–6
Win	9–6	Jul 2016	Tampere, Finland	Challenger	Clay	(Russia) Aslan Karatsev	6–4, 3–6, 7–5
Loss	9–7	Mar 2017	USA F10, Bakersfield	Futures	Hard	(Kazakhstan) Dmitry Popko	3–6, 6–7^{(6–8)}
Loss	9–8	Sep 2017	Kazakhstan F7, Shymkent	Futures	Clay	(Hungary) Attila Balázs	1–6, 2–6
Win	10–8	Nov 2017	Turkey F41, Antalya	Futures	Clay	(Italy) Davide Galoppini	6–0, 6–0
Win	11–8	Sep 2018	Seville, Spain	Challenger	Clay	(Slovakia) Alex Molčan	7–6^{(7–2)}, 6–1
Loss	11–9	Jun 2019	Blois, France	Challenger	Clay	(Portugal) Pedro Sousa	6–4, 3–6, 6–7^{(4–7)}
Loss	11–10	Jul 2019	Amersfoort, Netherlands	Challenger	Clay	(Germany) Mats Moraing	2–6, 6–3, 3–6
Loss	11–11	Mar 2021	Las Palmas, Spain	Challenger	Clay	(Spain) Carlos Gimeno Valero	4–6, 2–6
Loss	11–12	Jun 2022	Oeiras, Portugal	Challenger	Clay	(Japan) Kaichi Uchida	2–6, 4–6
Win	12–12	Sep 2022	Toulouse, France	Challenger	Clay	(France) Maxime Janvier	6–7^{(8–10)}, 6–4, 6–3
Loss	12–13	Aug 2023	Banja Luka, Bosnia and Herzegovina	Challenger	Clay	(Croatia) Dino Prižmić	2–6, 3–6
Win	13–13	Oct 2024	M15 Monastir, Tunisia	WTT	Hard	(United States) Omni Kumar	6–3, 6–2
Win	14–13	Oct 2024	M15 Monastir, Tunisia	WTT	Hard	(Italy) Fausto Tabacco	7–6^{(7–4)}, 6–2
Win	15–13	Oct 2024	M25 Monastir, Tunisia	WTT	Hard	(Italy) Francesco Maestrelli	7–5, 6–2
Win	16–13	Nov 2024	M25 Monastir, Tunisia	WTT	Hard	(Turkey) Altug Celikbilek	7–5, 5–7, 6–2
Win	17–13	Jun 2025	M25 Grasse, France	WTT	Clay	(Argentina) Alex Barrena	7–5, 6–3
Loss	17–14	Jul 2025	Bunschoten, Netherlands	Challenger	Clay	(United Kingdom) Jan Choinski	4–6, 6–3, 3–6
Loss	17–15	Oct 2025	Hersonissos, Greece	Challenger	Hard	(United Kingdom) Ryan Peniston	3–6, 5–7

=== Doubles: 9 (2–7) ===
Legend (doubles) ATP Challenger Tour (1–6) ITF Futures Tour (1–1)	Titles by surface Hard (1–1) Clay (1–6)

Result	W–L	Date	Tournament	Tier	Surface	Partner	Opponents	Score
Win	1–0	Aug 2013	Belgium F7, Oostende	Futures	Clay	(Belgium) Niels Desein	(Belgium) Sander Gillé (Spain) Roger Ordeig	6–2, 6–3
Loss	1–1	May 2017	Rome, Italy	Challenger	Clay	(Hungary) Márton Fucsovics	(Germany) Andreas Mies (Germany) Oscar Otte	6–4, 6–7^{(12–14)}, [8–10]
Loss	1–2	Mar 2018	Spain F6, Xàbia	Futures	Clay	(Russia) Ivan Gakhov	(Belgium) Germain Gigounon (Spain) Pedro Martínez	6–7^{(4–7)}, 6–7^{(1–7)}
Loss	1–3	May 2019	Braga, Portugal	Challenger	Clay	(Czech Republic) Zdeněk Kolář	(Spain) Gerard Granollers Pujol (Brazil) Fabrício Neis	4–6, 3–6
Loss	1–4	Sep 2019	Seville, Spain	Challenger	Clay	(Spain) Sergio Martos Gornés	(Spain) Gerard Granollers Pujol (Spain) Pedro Martínez	5–7, 4–6
Loss	1–5	Feb 2020	Launceston, Australia	Challenger	Hard	(Spain) Sergio Martos Gornés	(United States) Evan King (Zimbabwe) Benjamin Lock	6-3, 3–6, [8-10]
Loss	1–6	Feb 2021	Las Palmas, Spain	Challenger	Clay	(Spain) Sergio Martos Gornés	(United Kingdom) Lloyd Glasspool (Finland) Harri Heliövaara	5-7, 1–6
Loss	1–7	Nov 2024	Maia, Portugal	Challenger	Clay (i)	(Spain) Sergio Martos Gornés	(France) Théo Arribagé (Portugal) Francisco Cabral	1-6, 6–3, [5-10]
Win	2–7	Mar 2026	Hersonissos, Greece	Challenger	Hard	(Italy) Jacopo Berrettini	(United Kingdom) Finn Bass (Bulgaria) Anthony Genov	3–6, 6–1, [10–3].

== Junior Grand Slam finals ==
=== Singles: 1 (1 title) ===
Result	Year	Tournament	Surface	Opponent	Score
Win	2012	French Open	Clay	(Canada) Filip Peliwo	6–1, 6–4
