= Enzo Couacaud =

French professional tennis player

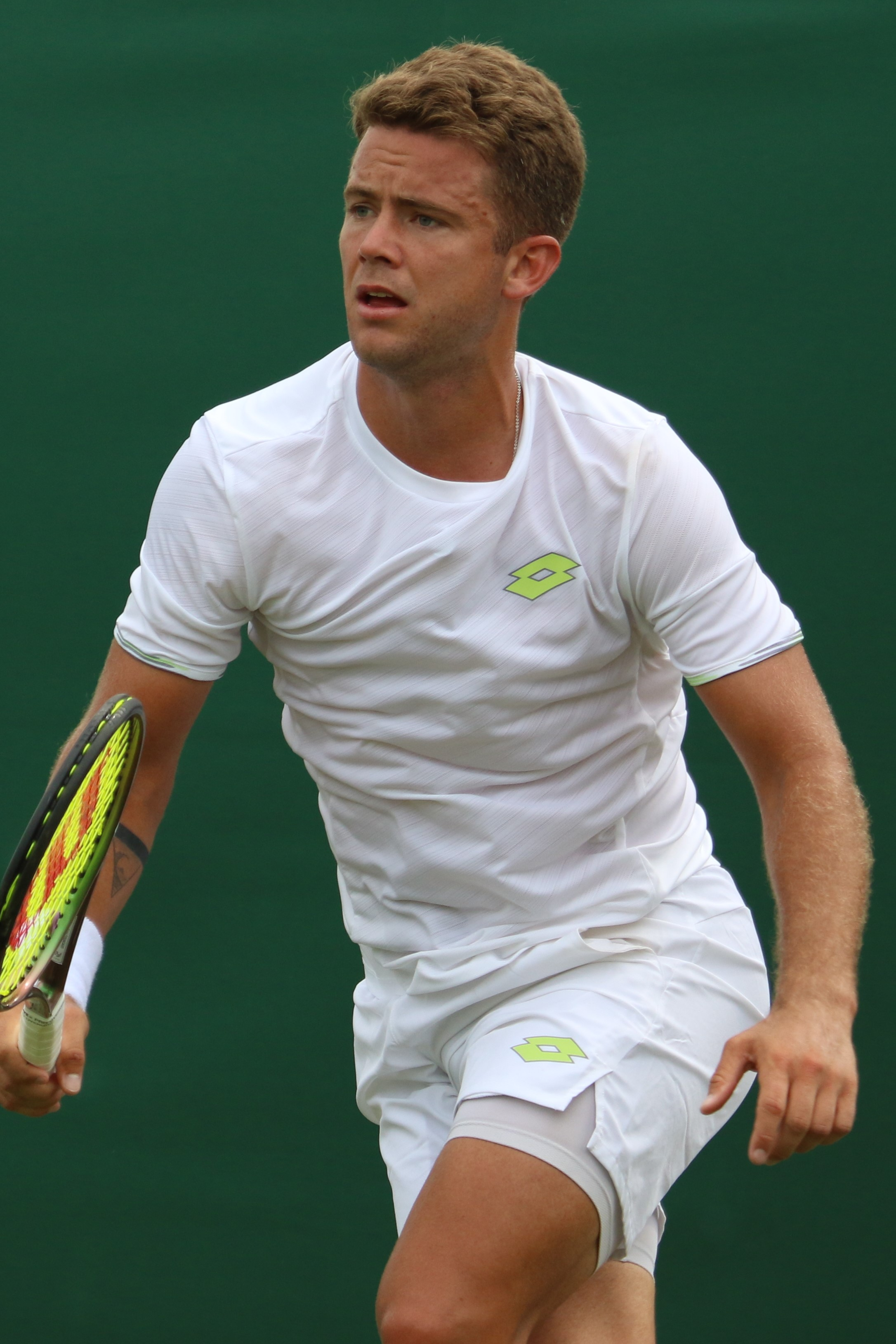
- Couacaud at the 2023 Wimbledon Championships
- Country (sports): France
- Residence: France
- Born: 1 March 1995 (age 31) Curepipe, Mauritius
- Height: 1.83 m (6 ft 0 in)
- Turned pro: 2013
- Retired: 2025
- Plays: Right-handed (two handed-backhand)
- Prize money: US $1,370,273

Singles
- Career record: 2–9
- Career titles: 0
- Highest ranking: No. 151 (17 July 2023)
- Current ranking: No. 1,155 (13 July 2026)

Grand Slam singles results
- Australian Open: 2R (2023)
- French Open: 2R (2021)
- Wimbledon: 1R (2022, 2023)
- US Open: 1R (2022, 2023)

Doubles
- Career record: 2–5
- Career titles: 0
- Highest ranking: No. 188 (8 March 2021)
- Current ranking: No. 1,307 (13 July 2026)

Grand Slam doubles results
- French Open: 2R (2019, 2022)

Grand Slam mixed doubles results
- French Open: 1R (2022)
- Last updated on: 15 July 2026.

Enzo Couacaud (French pronunciation: [ɛnzo kwako]; born 1 March 1995) is a French former professional tennis player. He has a career high singles ranking of world No. 151, which he achieved on 17 July 2023 and a doubles ranking of world No. 188 achieved on 8 March 2021.

== Career ==
=== 2015: Grand Slam doubles debut ===
Couacaud received a wildcard to enter the doubles main draw in the 2015 French Open with doubles partner Quentin Halys, losing in the first round.

He competed in the 2015 Wimbledon singles qualifying event, losing to John Millman in the third qualifying round.

=== 2018: Maiden Challenger title ===
Couacaud won his maiden Challenger title in Cassis, France, defeating Ugo Humbert in the final.

=== 2021: Major singles debut and first win ===
Couacaud made his Grand Slam singles main draw debut at the 2021 French Open as a wildcard where he defeated Egor Gerasimov to reach the second round.

=== 2022: Wimbledon and US Open debut ===
In May, Couacaud was awarded a wildcard into the main draw of the 2022 French Open in doubles partnering Manuel Guinard where they defeated Hans Hach Verdugo and Philipp Oswald.

He qualified for the 2022 Wimbledon Championships making his debut at this Major. He also qualified for the next Major making his debut at the US Open.

=== 2023: Australian Open debut and first win ===
In January, Couacaud qualified for the 2023 Australian Open making his debut at this Major. He reached the second round, where he took a set off eventual champion Novak Djokovic but lost in four sets.

In May, Couacaud was awarded a wildcard into the main draw of the 2023 French Open in doubles partnering Arthur Rinderknech.

Couacaud qualified for Wimbledon for the second year in a row, losing in the first round to J. J. Wolf. He then qualified for the US Open, also for the second year in a row. Couacaud lost to Jiri Vesely in the first round of the main draw.

=== 2024: Successful run at Challenger Tour ===
In January, Couacaud reached the final in Nouméa New Caledonia, his first Challenger final in two years but lost in the final to fellow countryman Arthur Cazaux. In March, he reached another Challenger final in São Léopoldo, Brazil, losing to Adolfo Daniel Vallejo in the final. The following week, he won the title in Florianópolis, Brazil, defeating Joao Lucas Reis Da Silva in the final. This represented his first Challenger title in three years.

Couacaud announced his retirement from professional tennis on 7 October 2025.

== Grand Slam Performance timeline ==
Key
W	F	SF	QF	#R	RR	Q#	P#	DNQ	A	Z#	PO	G	S	B	NMS	NTI	P	NH

(W) winner; (F) finalist; (SF) semifinalist; (QF) quarterfinalist; (#R) rounds 4, 3, 2, 1; (RR) round-robin stage; (Q#) qualification round; (P#) preliminary round; (DNQ) did not qualify; (A) absent; (Z#) Davis/Fed Cup Zonal Group (with number indication) or (PO) play-off; (G) gold, (S) silver or (B) bronze Olympic/Paralympic medal; (NMS) not a Masters tournament; (NTI) not a Tier I tournament; (P) postponed; (NH) not held; (SR) strike rate (events won / competed); (W–L) win–loss record.
To avoid confusion and double counting, these charts are updated at the conclusion of a tournament or when the player's participation has ended.

Tournament	2014	2015	2016	2017	2018	2019	2020	2021	2022	2023	2024	2025	SR	W–L	Win %
Grand Slam tournaments
Australian Open	Q2	Q2	A	A	A	A	Q2	Q1	Q3	2R	Q1	Q1	0 / 1	1–1	50%
French Open	Q1	Q1	A	A	A	Q3	Q3	2R	Q2	Q1	Q2	A	0 / 1	1–1	50%
Wimbledon	A	Q3	A	A	A	Q3	NH	Q2	1R	1R	Q1	A	0 / 2	0–2	0%
US Open	A	Q1	A	A	A	Q2	A	Q3	1R	1R	Q1	A	0 / 2	0–2	0%
Win–loss	0–0	0–0	0–0	0–0	0–0	0–0	0–0	1–1	0–2	1–3	0–0	0–0	0 / 6	2–6	25%

== ATP Challenger and Futures/ITF World Tennis Tour finals ==
=== Singles: 28 (15 titles, 12 runner-ups & 1 not contested) ===
Legend (singles) ATP Challenger Tour (3–5) Futures/ITF World Tennis Tour (12–7)	Finals by surface Hard (11–9) Clay (4–3) Grass (0–0) Carpet (0–0)

Result	W–L	Date	Tournament	Tier	Surface	Opponent	Score
Win	1–0	Apr 2013	Israel F7, Ashkelon	Futures	Hard	(Japan) Takuto Niki	7–5, 6–1
Loss	1–1	Jul 2013	Turkey F27, Istanbul	Futures	Hard	(Brazil) Henrique Cunha	6–2, 2–6, 4–6
Win	2–1	Jul 2013	Turkey F28, Istanbul	Futures	Hard	(Israel) Bar Tzuf Botzer	6–4, 6–1
Loss	2–2	Aug 2013	Turkey F32, İzmir	Futures	Hard	(Croatia) Borna Ćorić	7–6^{(7–0)}, 6–7^{(1–7)}, 5–7
Loss	2–3	Feb 2014	Turkey F4, Antalya	Futures	Hard	(Belgium) Kimmer Coppejans	5–7, 2–6
Win	3–3	Jun 2014	France F12, Toulon	Futures	Clay	(France) Constant Lestienne	6–4, 6–2
Win	4–3	Aug 2014	Croatia F14, Čakovec	Futures	Clay	(Germany) Peter Heller	6–2, 6–4
Win	5–3	Sep 2014	France F17, Bagnères-de-Bigorre	Futures	Hard	(France) Laurent Lokoli	6–2, 6–3
Loss	5–4	Oct 2014	France F21, Nevers	Futures	Hard (i)	(Belgium) Niels Desein	1–6, 7–6^{(9–7)}, 2–6
Loss	5–5	Nov 2015	Cyprus F2, Limassol	Futures	Hard	(Serbia) Miki Janković	1–6, 2–6
Win	6–5	Oct 2016	Vietnam F8, Thủ Dầu Một	Futures	Hard	(India) Rishab Agarwal	6–2, 6–1
Win	7–5	Nov 2016	Vietnam F9, Thủ Dầu Một	Futures	Hard	(Philippines) Francis Casey Alcantara	6–1, 6–1
Loss	7–6	Dec 2016	Indonesia F4, Jakarta	Futures	Hard	(Japan) Shintaro Imai	6–7^{(3–7)}, 3–6
Win	8–6	Dec 2016	Indonesia F5, Jakarta	Futures	Hard	(Japan) Yusuke Takahashi	6–3, 6–2
Win	9–6	Dec 2016	Indonesia F6, Jakarta	Futures	Hard	(Japan) Kento Takeuchi	6–1, 6–1
Win	10–6	Mar 2017	Israel F1, Ramat HaSharon	Futures	Hard	(Israel) Edan Leshem	6–4, 6–4
Win	11–6	Mar 2017	Israel F2, Ramat HaSharon	Futures	Hard	(Israel) Edan Leshem	7–5, 6–1
Win	12–6	Nov 2017	Vietnam F1, Thủ Dầu Một	Futures	Hard	(Kyrgyzstan) Daniiar Duldaev	6–1, 6–1
Win	13–6	Sep 2018	Cassis, France	Challenger	Hard	(France) Ugo Humbert	6–2, 6–3
Loss	13–7	Jul 2019	Gatineau, Canada	Challenger	Hard	(Australia) Jason Kubler	4–6, 4–6
NC	13–7	Feb 2020	Bergamo, Italy	Challenger	Hard	(Ukraine) Illya Marchenko	Final cancelled (Note: Final cancelled due to COVID-19 pandemic.)
Win	14–7	Feb 2021	Las Palmas, Spain	Challenger	Clay	(Canada) Steven Diez	7–6^{(7–5)}, 7–6^{(7–3)}
Loss	14–8	May 2021	Biella, Italy	Challenger	Clay	(Australia) Thanasi Kokkinakis	3–6, 4–6
Loss	14–9	Jan 2022	Bendigo, Australia	Challenger	Hard	(United States) Ernesto Escobedo	7–5, 3–6, 5–7
Loss	14–10	Jan 2024	Nouméa, New Caledonia	Challenger	Hard	(France) Arthur Cazaux	1–6, 1–6
Loss	14–11	Mar 2024	São Léopoldo, Brazil	Challenger	Clay	(Paraguay) Adolfo Daniel Vallejo	3–6, 2–6
Win	15–11	Apr 2024	Florianópolis, Brazil	Challenger	Clay	(Brazil) Joao Lucas Reis Da Silva	3–6, 6–4, 7–6^{(7–1)}
Loss	15–12	Jun 2025	M25 Brussels, Belgium	World Tennis Tour	Clay	(Germany) Marvin Moeller	Walkover

=== Doubles: 11 (5 titles, 6 runner-ups) ===
Legend (doubles) ATP Challenger Tour (3–3) Futures/ITF World Tennis Tour (2–3)	Finals by surface Hard (2–4) Clay (3–1) Grass (0–0) Carpet (0–1)

Result	W–L	Date	Tournament	Tier	Surface	Partner	Opponents	Score
Loss	0–1	Nov 2012	Greece F7, Heraklion	Futures	Carpet	(Belgium) Julien Dubail	(Serbia) Nikola Čačić (Croatia) Mate Delić	1–6, 2–6
Win	1–1	Feb 2014	Turkey F4, Antalya	Futures	Hard	(Monaco) Romain Arneodo	(United Kingdom) Richard Gabb (United Kingdom) Jonny O'Mara	6–3, 6–0
Win	2–1	Jun 2014	France F11, Ajaccio	Futures	Clay	(France) Laurent Rochette	(Germany) Florian Fallert (Germany) Nils Langer	6–3, 3–6, [10–6]
Loss	2–2	Sep 2014	France F17, Bagnères-de-Bigorre	Futures	Hard	(France) Laurent Lokoli	(United Kingdom) Edward Corrie (United Kingdom) David Rice	4–6, 6–2, [5–10]
Loss	2–3	Jul 2015	Granby, Canada	Challenger	Hard	(Australia) Luke Saville	(Canada) Philip Bester (Canada) Peter Polansky	7–6^{(7–5)}, 6–7^{(2–7)}, [7–10]
Loss	2–4	Dec 2016	Indonesia F4, Jakarta	Futures	Hard	(Belgium) Julien Cagnina	(South Korea) Chung Yun-seong (Japan) Shintaro Imai	2–6, 4–6
Loss	2–5	Apr 2019	Sophia Antipolis, France	Challenger	Clay	(France) Tristan Lamasine	(Netherlands) Thiemo de Bakker (Netherlands) Robin Haase	4–6, 4–6
Win	3–5	Oct 2020	Alicante, Spain	Challenger	Clay	(France) Albano Olivetti	(Spain) Íñigo Cervantes (Spain) Oriol Roca Batalla	4–6, 6–4, [10–2]
Win	4–5	Mar 2021	Las Palmas, Spain	Challenger	Clay	(France) Manuel Guinard	(Spain) Javier Barranco Cosano (Spain) Eduard Esteve Lobato	6-1, 6-4
Loss	4–6	Jan 2022	Bendigo, Australia	Challenger	Hard	(Slovenia) Blaž Rola	(Belgium) Ruben Bemelmans (Germany) Daniel Masur	6-7^{(2-7)}, 4-6
Win	5–6	July 2022	Rome, USA	Challenger	Hard (i)	(Australia) Andrew Harris	(Philippines) Ruben Gonzales (United States) Reese Stalder	6-4, 6-2

== Record against top 10 players ==
Player	Years	MP	Record	Win%	Hard	Clay	Grass	Last match
Number 1 ranked players								
(Serbia) Novak Djokovic	2023–	1	0–1	0%	0–1	–	–	Lost (1–6, 7–6^{(7–5)}, 2–6, 0–6) at 2023 Australian Open 2R
Number 8 ranked players								
(United States) John Isner	2022–	1	0–1	0%	–	–	0–1	Lost (7–6^{(8–6)}, 6–7^{(3–7)}, 6–4, 3–6, 5–7) at 2022 Wimbledon Championship 1R
Number 10 ranked players								
(Spain) Pablo Carreño Busta	2021–	1	0–1	0%	–	0–1	–	Lost (6–2, 3–6, 4–6, 4–6) at 2021 French Open 2R
Total	2021–23	3	0–3	0%	0–1 (0%)	0–1 (0%)	0–1 (0%)	Statistics correct as of 19 January 2023.

== Junior Grand Slam finals ==
=== Doubles: 1 (1 runner-up) ===
Result	Year	Tournament	Surface	Partner	Opponents	Score
Loss	2013	Wimbledon	Grass	(Italy) Stefano Napolitano	(Australia) Thanasi Kokkinakis (Australia) Nick Kyrgios	2–6, 2–6
