= Gran Canaria Challenger =

- 2022 Gran Canaria Challenger

ATP Challenger Tour
- Event name: Gran Canaria Challenger
- Location: Telde, Las Palmas Province, Spain
- Venue: El Cortijo Club de Campo
- Category: ATP Challenger 80
- Surface: Clay
- Draw: 32S/24Q/16D
- Prize money: $ 53,120
- Website: grancanariachallenger.com/

Current champions (2022)
- Singles: (Italy) Gianluca Mager
- Doubles: (France) Sadio Doumbia (France) Fabien Reboul

The Gran Canaria Challenger was a professional tennis tournament played on clay courts. It was part of the ATP Challenger Tour. It was held in Telde, Province of Las Palmas, Spain.

== Past finals ==
=== Singles ===
| Year | Champion | Runner-up | Score |
|---|---|---|---|
| 2022 | (Italy) Gianluca Mager | (Spain) Roberto Carballés Baena | 7–6^{(8–6)}, 6–2 |
| 2021 (2) | (Spain) Carlos Gimeno Valero | (Belgium) Kimmer Coppejans | 6–4, 6–2 |
| 2021 (1) | (France) Enzo Couacaud | (Canada) Steven Diez | 7–6^{(7–5)}, 7–6^{(7–3)} |

=== Doubles ===
| Year | Champions | Runners-up | Score |
|---|---|---|---|
| 2022 | (France) Sadio Doumbia (France) Fabien Reboul | (Italy) Matteo Arnaldi (Italy) Luciano Darderi | 5–7, 6–4, [10–7] |
| 2021 (2) | (France) Enzo Couacaud (France) Manuel Guinard | (Spain) Javier Barranco Cosano (Spain) Eduard Esteve Lobato | 6–1, 6–4 |
| 2021 (1) | (United Kingdom) Lloyd Glasspool (Finland) Harri Heliövaara | (Belgium) Kimmer Coppejans (Spain) Sergio Martos Gornés | 7–5, 6–1 |
