= Carlos Gimeno Valero =

Spanish tennis player (born 2001)

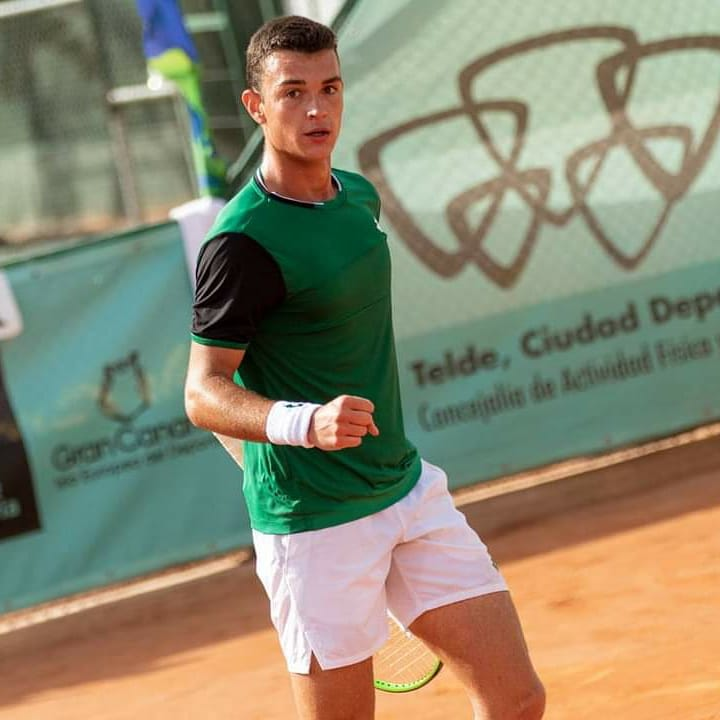
- Carlos Gimeno Valero
- Country (sports): Spain
- Born: 25 June 2001 (age 25) Valencia, Spain
- Height: 1.93 m (6 ft 4 in)
- Turned pro: 2019
- Plays: Right-handed (two-handed backhand)
- Coach: Fran Martinez Lidon
- Prize money: $107,024

Singles
- Career record: 0–1
- Career titles: 0
- Highest ranking: No. 260 (9 August 2021)

Doubles
- Career record: 0–0
- Career titles: 0
- Highest ranking: No. 1,508 (2 December 2019)

Carlos Gimeno Valero (born 25 June 2001) is a Spanish tennis player. Gimeno Valero has a career high ATP singles ranking of World No. 260 achieved on 9 August 2021 and a career high doubles ranking of World No. 1,508 achieved on 2 December 2019.

== Juniors ==
As a junior, Gimeno Valero reached his highest ranking of No. 12 in the world, in the combined singles and doubles junior ranking system. This was highlighted by a runner-up finish at the 2019 Wimbledon where he was defeated in the championship match by Japanese player Shintaro Mochizuki in straight sets 3–6, 2–6.

=== Junior Grand Slam finals ===
==== Singles: 1 (1 runner-up) ====
Result	Year	Tournament	Surface	Opponent	Score
Loss	2019	Wimbledon	Grass	(Japan) Shintaro Mochizuki	3–6, 2–6

== Career ==
Gimeno Valero has reached four career ITF singles finals winning all of them for a record of 4–0, which includes winning one ATP Challenger title, the Gran Canaria 2 Challenger in March 2021, where he defeated Belgian Kimmer Coppejans in straight sets in the final.

He managed to win in the first round of qualifying at the 2021 Barcelona Open by defeating Mikhail Kukushkin ‘in straight sets but would go on to lose in the second round to Tallon Griekspoor 7–6^{(7–4)}, 6–7^{(4–7)}, 3–6.

== ATP Challenger and ITF World Tennis Tour Finals ==
=== Singles: 8 (7–1) ===
Legend ATP Challenger (1–0) ITF World Tennis Tour (6–1)	Finals by surface Hard (1–0) Clay (6–1) Grass (0–0) Carpet (0–0)

Result	W–L	Date	Tournament	Tier	Surface	Opponent	Score
Win	1–0	Oct 2019	M25 Riba-roja de Turia, Spain	World Tennis Tour	Clay	(Switzerland) Johan Nikles	6–4, 6–2
Win	2–0	Oct 2019	M15 Benicarlo, Spain	World Tennis Tour	Clay	(Spain) Francisco Andreu Garcia	6–1, 6–2
Win	3–0	Sep 2020	M15 Sintra, Portugal	World Tennis Tour	Hard	(Germany) Sebastian Fanselow	6–4, 3–6, 6–4
Win	4–0	Mar 2021	Las Palmas, Spain	Challenger	Clay	(Belgium) Kimmer Coppejans	6–4, 6–2
Win	5–0	May 2021	M25 Vic, Spain	World Tennis Tour	Clay	(Argentina) Pedro Cachin	1–6, 6–3, 6–4
Loss	5–1	Nov 2023	M15 Valencia, Spain	World Tennis Tour	Clay	(Argentina) Marco Trungelliti	0–6, 2–6
Win	6–1	Jan 2024	M15 Antalya, Turkey	World Tennis Tour	Clay	(Romania) Filip Cristian Jianu	6–3, 6–4
Win	7–1	Feb 2024	M25 Antalya, Turkey	World Tennis Tour	Clay	(Lithuania) Vilius Gaubas	1–6, 7–6^{(7–1)}, 7–5
