= 2019 ATP Challenger Tour =

Tennis tour

Details
- Duration: 31 December 2018 – 24 November 2019
- Edition: 42nd (11th under this name)
- Tournaments: 158
- Categories: Challenger 125 (20); Challenger 110 (7); Challenger 100 (11); Challenger 90 (21); Challenger 80 (99)

Achievements (singles)
- Most titles: (Lithuania) Ričardas Berankis (Australia) James Duckworth (Finland) Emil Ruusuvuori (Sweden) Mikael Ymer (4)
- Most finals: (Australia) James Duckworth (Sweden) Mikael Ymer (6)

The ATP Challenger Tour in 2019 was the secondary professional tennis circuit organized by the ATP. The 2019 ATP Challenger Tour calendar had 158 tournaments scheduled, with prize money ranging from $54,160 up to $162,480. It was the 42nd edition of challenger tournaments cycle, and 11th under the name of Challenger Tour.

== Schedule ==
This was the complete schedule of events on the 2019 calendar, with player progression documented from the quarterfinals stage.

=== January ===
Week of	Tournament	Champions	Runners-up	Semifinalists	Quarterfinalists
December 31	BNP Paribas de Nouvelle-Calédonie; Nouméa, New Caledonia; Challenger 90 – hard – 48S/4Q/16D; Singles – Doubles	(Sweden) Mikael Ymer; 6–3, 6–3	(United States) Noah Rubin	(Argentina) Federico Delbonis (United States) Donald Young	(France) Grégoire Barrère (Austria) Jurij Rodionov (United States) Thai-Son Kwiatkowski (France) Gleb Sakharov
December 31	BNP Paribas de Nouvelle-Calédonie; Nouméa, New Caledonia; Challenger 90 – hard – 48S/4Q/16D; Singles – Doubles	(Germany) Dustin Brown (United States) Donald Young; 7–5, 6–4	(Sweden) André Göransson (Netherlands) Sem Verbeek	(Argentina) Federico Delbonis (United States) Donald Young	(France) Grégoire Barrère (Austria) Jurij Rodionov (United States) Thai-Son Kwiatkowski (France) Gleb Sakharov
December 31	City of Playford Tennis International; Playford, Australia; Challenger 90 – hard – 48S/4Q/16D; Singles – Doubles	(Brazil) Rogério Dutra Silva; 6–3, 6–2	(Germany) Mats Moraing	(France) Constant Lestienne (China) Li Zhe	(Italy) Lorenzo Sonego (South Africa) Lloyd Harris (United States) Tommy Paul (Norway) Casper Ruud
December 31	City of Playford Tennis International; Playford, Australia; Challenger 90 – hard – 48S/4Q/16D; Singles – Doubles	(Australia) Max Purcell (Australia) Luke Saville; 6–4, 7–5	(Uruguay) Ariel Behar (Spain) Enrique López Pérez	(France) Constant Lestienne (China) Li Zhe	(Italy) Lorenzo Sonego (South Africa) Lloyd Harris (United States) Tommy Paul (Norway) Casper Ruud
December 31	Orlando Open; Orlando, United States; Challenger 80 – hard – 48S/4Q/16D; Singles – Doubles	(United States) Marcos Giron; 6–4, 6–4	(Barbados) Darian King	(United States) Michael Redlicki (Portugal) Gastão Elias	(Slovakia) Norbert Gombos (United States) Ulises Blanch (France) Mathias Bourgue (Croatia) Nino Serdarušić
December 31	Orlando Open; Orlando, United States; Challenger 80 – hard – 48S/4Q/16D; Singles – Doubles	(Monaco) Romain Arneodo (Belarus) Andrei Vasilevski; 7–6^{(7–2)}, 2–6, [15–13]	(Portugal) Gonçalo Oliveira (Italy) Andrea Vavassori	(United States) Michael Redlicki (Portugal) Gastão Elias	(Slovakia) Norbert Gombos (United States) Ulises Blanch (France) Mathias Bourgue (Croatia) Nino Serdarušić
January 7	Canberra Challenger; Canberra, Australia; Challenger 80 – hard – 48S/4Q/16D; Singles – Doubles	(Poland) Hubert Hurkacz; 6–4, 4–6, 6–2	(Belarus) Ilya Ivashka	(Argentina) Renzo Olivo (Czech Republic) Jiří Veselý	(France) Sadio Doumbia (France) Elliot Benchetrit (Australia) Bradley Mousley (France) Tristan Lamasine
January 7	Canberra Challenger; Canberra, Australia; Challenger 80 – hard – 48S/4Q/16D; Singles – Doubles	(Brazil) Marcelo Demoliner (France) Hugo Nys; 3–6, 6–4, [10–3]	(Sweden) André Göransson (Netherlands) Sem Verbeek	(Argentina) Renzo Olivo (Czech Republic) Jiří Veselý	(France) Sadio Doumbia (France) Elliot Benchetrit (Australia) Bradley Mousley (France) Tristan Lamasine
January 7	Columbus Challenger; Columbus, United States; Challenger 80 – hard (i) – 48S/4Q/16D; Singles – Doubles	(United States) J. J. Wolf; 6–7^{(4–7)}, 6–3, 6–4	(Denmark) Mikael Torpegaard	(Spain) Bernabé Zapata Miralles (Netherlands) Scott Griekspoor	(Austria) Lucas Miedler (France) Vincent Millot (Belarus) Uladzimir Ignatik (United Kingdom) Jan Choinski
January 7	Columbus Challenger; Columbus, United States; Challenger 80 – hard (i) – 48S/4Q/16D; Singles – Doubles	(United States) Maxime Cressy (Portugal) Bernardo Saraiva; 7–5, 7–6^{(7–3)}	(United States) Robert Galloway (United States) Nathaniel Lammons	(Spain) Bernabé Zapata Miralles (Netherlands) Scott Griekspoor	(Austria) Lucas Miedler (France) Vincent Millot (Belarus) Uladzimir Ignatik (United Kingdom) Jan Choinski
January 7	Da Nang Tennis Open; Da Nang, Vietnam; Challenger 80 – hard – 48S/4Q/16D; Singles – Doubles	(Spain) Marcel Granollers; 6–2, 6–0	(Italy) Matteo Viola	(Kazakhstan) Denis Yevseyev (United States) Thai-Son Kwiatkowski	(Russia) Alen Avidzba (Spain) Gerard Granollers (Chinese Taipei) Yang Tsung-hua (China) Bai Yan
January 7	Da Nang Tennis Open; Da Nang, Vietnam; Challenger 80 – hard – 48S/4Q/16D; Singles – Doubles	(Chinese Taipei) Hsieh Cheng-peng (Indonesia) Christopher Rungkat; 6–3, 2–6, [11–9]	(India) Leander Paes (Mexico) Miguel Ángel Reyes-Varela	(Kazakhstan) Denis Yevseyev (United States) Thai-Son Kwiatkowski	(Russia) Alen Avidzba (Spain) Gerard Granollers (Chinese Taipei) Yang Tsung-hua (China) Bai Yan
January 14	Koblenz Open; Koblenz, Germany; Challenger 80 – hard (i) – 48S/4Q/16D; Singles – Doubles	(Italy) Gianluca Mager; 2–6, 7–6^{(8–6)}, 6–2	(Spain) Roberto Ortega Olmedo	(Netherlands) Tallon Griekspoor (Russia) Pavel Kotov	(Japan) Kaichi Uchida (Russia) Alexey Vatutin (Spain) Carlos Taberner (Sweden) Mikael Ymer
January 14	Koblenz Open; Koblenz, Germany; Challenger 80 – hard (i) – 48S/4Q/16D; Singles – Doubles	(Czech Republic) Zdeněk Kolář (Czech Republic) Adam Pavlásek; 6–3, 6–4	(Austria) Jürgen Melzer (Slovakia) Filip Polášek	(Netherlands) Tallon Griekspoor (Russia) Pavel Kotov	(Japan) Kaichi Uchida (Russia) Alexey Vatutin (Spain) Carlos Taberner (Sweden) Mikael Ymer
January 21	Oracle Challenger Series – Newport Beach; Newport Beach, United States; Challenger 125 – hard – 48S/4Q/16D; Singles – Doubles	(United States) Taylor Fritz; 7–6^{(9–7)}, 6–4	(Canada) Brayden Schnur	(France) Enzo Couacaud (United States) Donald Young	(Serbia) Miomir Kecmanović (Barbados) Darian King (Chinese Taipei) Jason Jung (United States) Collin Altamirano
January 21	Oracle Challenger Series – Newport Beach; Newport Beach, United States; Challenger 125 – hard – 48S/4Q/16D; Singles – Doubles	(United States) Robert Galloway (United States) Nathaniel Lammons; 7–5, 7–6^{(7–1)}	(Monaco) Romain Arneodo (Belarus) Andrei Vasilevski	(France) Enzo Couacaud (United States) Donald Young	(Serbia) Miomir Kecmanović (Barbados) Darian King (Chinese Taipei) Jason Jung (United States) Collin Altamirano
January 21	Open de Rennes; Rennes, France; Challenger 90 – hard (i) – 48S/4Q/16D; Singles – Doubles	(Lithuania) Ričardas Berankis; 6–4, 6–2	(France) Antoine Hoang	(France) Corentin Moutet (Germany) Yannick Maden	(Cyprus) Marcos Baghdatis (France) Quentin Halys (Sweden) Elias Ymer (France) Benoît Paire
January 21	Open de Rennes; Rennes, France; Challenger 90 – hard (i) – 48S/4Q/16D; Singles – Doubles	(Netherlands) Sander Arends (Austria) Tristan-Samuel Weissborn; 6–4, 6–4	(Netherlands) David Pel (Croatia) Antonio Šančić	(France) Corentin Moutet (Germany) Yannick Maden	(Cyprus) Marcos Baghdatis (France) Quentin Halys (Sweden) Elias Ymer (France) Benoît Paire
January 21	Burnie International; Burnie, Australia; Challenger 80 – hard – 48S/4Q/16D; Singles – Doubles	(Canada) Steven Diez; 7–5, 6–1	(Australia) Maverick Banes	(United Kingdom) Jay Clarke (Poland) Kamil Majchrzak	(Italy) Stefano Napolitano (Australia) Harry Bourchier (Germany) Sebastian Fanselow (France) Stéphane Robert
January 21	Burnie International; Burnie, Australia; Challenger 80 – hard – 48S/4Q/16D; Singles – Doubles	(South Africa) Lloyd Harris (Israel) Dudi Sela; 6–3, 6–7^{(3–7)}, [10–8]	(Bosnia and Herzegovina) Mirza Bašić (Bosnia and Herzegovina) Tomislav Brkić	(United Kingdom) Jay Clarke (Poland) Kamil Majchrzak	(Italy) Stefano Napolitano (Australia) Harry Bourchier (Germany) Sebastian Fanselow (France) Stéphane Robert
January 21	Punta Open; Punta del Este, Uruguay; Challenger 80 – clay – 48S/4Q/16D; Singles – Doubles	(Brazil) Thiago Monteiro; 3–6, 6–2, 6–3	(Argentina) Facundo Argüello	(Ecuador) Emilio Gómez (Argentina) Facundo Bagnis	(Belgium) Kimmer Coppejans (Italy) Gianluigi Quinzi (Bolivia) Hugo Dellien (Argentina) Juan Ignacio Londero
January 21	Punta Open; Punta del Este, Uruguay; Challenger 80 – clay – 48S/4Q/16D; Singles – Doubles	(Argentina) Guido Andreozzi (Argentina) Guillermo Durán; 6–2, 6–7^{(6–8)}, [10–8]	(Belgium) Sander Gillé (Belgium) Joran Vliegen	(Ecuador) Emilio Gómez (Argentina) Facundo Bagnis	(Belgium) Kimmer Coppejans (Italy) Gianluigi Quinzi (Bolivia) Hugo Dellien (Argentina) Juan Ignacio Londero
January 28	Cleveland Open; Cleveland, United States; Challenger 90 – hard (i) – 48S/4Q/16D; Singles – Doubles	(United States) Maxime Cressy; 6–7^{(4–7)}, 7–6^{(8–6)}, 6–3	(Denmark) Mikael Torpegaard	(United States) Marcos Giron (Barbados) Darian King	(United States) Jared Hiltzik (Croatia) Borna Gojo (United States) Noah Rubin (Canada) Brayden Schnur
January 28	Cleveland Open; Cleveland, United States; Challenger 90 – hard (i) – 48S/4Q/16D; Singles – Doubles	(Monaco) Romain Arneodo (Belarus) Andrei Vasilevski; 6–4, 7–6^{(7–4)}	(United States) Robert Galloway (United States) Nathaniel Lammons	(United States) Marcos Giron (Barbados) Darian King	(United States) Jared Hiltzik (Croatia) Borna Gojo (United States) Noah Rubin (Canada) Brayden Schnur
January 28	Launceston Tennis International; Launceston, Australia; Challenger 80 – hard – 48S/4Q/16D; Singles – Doubles	(South Africa) Lloyd Harris; 6–2, 6–2	(Italy) Lorenzo Giustino	(Israel) Dudi Sela (Australia) Luke Saville	(Spain) Nicola Kuhn (Australia) Max Purcell (France) Tristan Lamasine (United Kingdom) Jay Clarke
January 28	Launceston Tennis International; Launceston, Australia; Challenger 80 – hard – 48S/4Q/16D; Singles – Doubles	(Australia) Max Purcell (Australia) Luke Saville; 7–5, 6–4	(Japan) Hiroki Moriya (Egypt) Mohamed Safwat	(Israel) Dudi Sela (Australia) Luke Saville	(Spain) Nicola Kuhn (Australia) Max Purcell (France) Tristan Lamasine (United Kingdom) Jay Clarke
January 28	Open BNP Paribas Banque de Bretagne; Quimper, France; Challenger 80 – hard (i) – 48S/4Q/16D; Singles – Doubles	(France) Grégoire Barrère; 4–6, 6–2, 6–3	(United Kingdom) Dan Evans	(France) Mathias Bourgue (France) Ugo Humbert	(Estonia) Jürgen Zopp (Germany) Matthias Bachinger (Russia) Roman Safiullin (Germany) Tobias Kamke
January 28	Open BNP Paribas Banque de Bretagne; Quimper, France; Challenger 80 – hard (i) – 48S/4Q/16D; Singles – Doubles	(France) Fabrice Martin (France) Hugo Nys; 6–4, 6–2	(Netherlands) David Pel (Croatia) Antonio Šančić	(France) Mathias Bourgue (France) Ugo Humbert	(Estonia) Jürgen Zopp (Germany) Matthias Bachinger (Russia) Roman Safiullin (Germany) Tobias Kamke

=== February ===
Week of	Tournament	Champions	Runners-up	Semifinalists	Quarterfinalists
February 4	RBC Tennis Championships of Dallas; Dallas, United States; Challenger 110 – hard (i) – 48S/4Q/16D; Singles – Doubles	(United States) Mitchell Krueger; 4–6, 7–6^{(7–3)}, 6–1	(United States) Mackenzie McDonald	(United States) Reilly Opelka (United States) Bjorn Fratangelo	(Canada) Brayden Schnur (Germany) Dominik Koepfer (Chinese Taipei) Jason Jung (United States) Marcos Giron
February 4	RBC Tennis Championships of Dallas; Dallas, United States; Challenger 110 – hard (i) – 48S/4Q/16D; Singles – Doubles	(United States) Marcos Giron (United States) Dennis Novikov; 6–4, 7–6^{(7–3)}	(Croatia) Ante Pavić (South Africa) Ruan Roelofse	(United States) Reilly Opelka (United States) Bjorn Fratangelo	(Canada) Brayden Schnur (Germany) Dominik Koepfer (Chinese Taipei) Jason Jung (United States) Marcos Giron
February 4	Hungarian Challenger Open; Budapest, Hungary; Challenger 80 – hard (i) – 48S/4Q/16D; Singles – Doubles	(Kazakhstan) Alexander Bublik; 6–0, 6–3	(Italy) Roberto Marcora	(Germany) Oscar Otte (Slovakia) Filip Horanský	(Czech Republic) Zdeněk Kolář (France) Mathias Bourgue (Slovakia) Alex Molčan (Croatia) Viktor Galović
February 4	Hungarian Challenger Open; Budapest, Hungary; Challenger 80 – hard (i) – 48S/4Q/16D; Singles – Doubles	(Germany) Kevin Krawietz (Slovakia) Filip Polášek; 7–5, 7–6^{(7–5)}	(Italy) Filippo Baldi (Switzerland) Luca Margaroli	(Germany) Oscar Otte (Slovakia) Filip Horanský	(Czech Republic) Zdeněk Kolář (France) Mathias Bourgue (Slovakia) Alex Molčan (Croatia) Viktor Galović
February 4	Chennai Open Challenger; Chennai, India; Challenger 80 – hard – 48S/4Q/16D; Singles – Doubles	(France) Corentin Moutet; 6–3, 6–3	(Australia) Andrew Harris	(India) Prajnesh Gunneswaran (India) Sasikumar Mukund	(Australia) James Duckworth (Spain) Alejandro Davidovich Fokina (United Kingdom) Brydan Klein (Spain) Nicola Kuhn
February 4	Chennai Open Challenger; Chennai, India; Challenger 80 – hard – 48S/4Q/16D; Singles – Doubles	(Italy) Gianluca Mager (Italy) Andrea Pellegrino; 6–4, 7–6^{(9–7)}	(Australia) Matt Reid (Australia) Luke Saville	(India) Prajnesh Gunneswaran (India) Sasikumar Mukund	(Australia) James Duckworth (Spain) Alejandro Davidovich Fokina (United Kingdom) Brydan Klein (Spain) Nicola Kuhn
February 11	Challenger La Manche; Cherbourg-en-Cotentin, France; Challenger 80 – hard (i) – 48S/4Q/16D; Singles – Doubles	(France) Ugo Humbert; 6–7^{(6–8)}, 6–3, 6–3	(Belgium) Steve Darcis	(Germany) Mats Moraing (Italy) Stefano Travaglia	(Germany) Oscar Otte (France) Nicolas Mahut (Italy) Luca Vanni (Czech Republic) Lukáš Rosol
February 11	Challenger La Manche; Cherbourg-en-Cotentin, France; Challenger 80 – hard (i) – 48S/4Q/16D; Singles – Doubles	(United States) Robert Galloway (United States) Nathaniel Lammons; 4–6, 7–6^{(7–4)}, [10–8]	(Spain) Javier Barranco Cosano (Italy) Raúl Brancaccio	(Germany) Mats Moraing (Italy) Stefano Travaglia	(Germany) Oscar Otte (France) Nicolas Mahut (Italy) Luca Vanni (Czech Republic) Lukáš Rosol
February 11	Bangkok Challenger; Bangkok, Thailand; Challenger 80 – hard – 48S/4Q/16D; Singles – Doubles	(Switzerland) Henri Laaksonen; 6–2, 6–4	(Israel) Dudi Sela	(Australia) James Duckworth (Japan) Tatsuma Ito	(United States) JC Aragone (Japan) Go Soeda (Germany) Tobias Kamke (South Korea) Kwon Soon-woo
February 11	Bangkok Challenger; Bangkok, Thailand; Challenger 80 – hard – 48S/4Q/16D; Singles – Doubles	(China) Gong Maoxin (China) Zhang Ze; 6–4, 6–4	(Chinese Taipei) Hsieh Cheng-peng (Indonesia) Christopher Rungkat	(Australia) James Duckworth (Japan) Tatsuma Ito	(United States) JC Aragone (Japan) Go Soeda (Germany) Tobias Kamke (South Korea) Kwon Soon-woo
February 18	Trofeo Faip–Perrel; Bergamo, Italy; Challenger 80 – hard (i) – 48S/4Q/16D; Singles – Doubles	(Italy) Jannik Sinner; 6–3, 6–1	(Italy) Roberto Marcora	(France) Tristan Lamasine (Belgium) Arthur De Greef	(Italy) Stefano Napolitano (Italy) Gianluigi Quinzi (Italy) Luca Vanni (United Kingdom) Jan Choinski
February 18	Trofeo Faip–Perrel; Bergamo, Italy; Challenger 80 – hard (i) – 48S/4Q/16D; Singles – Doubles	(Lithuania) Laurynas Grigelis (Czech Republic) Zdeněk Kolář; 7–5, 7–6^{(9–7)}	(Bosnia and Herzegovina) Tomislav Brkić (Germany) Dustin Brown	(France) Tristan Lamasine (Belgium) Arthur De Greef	(Italy) Stefano Napolitano (Italy) Gianluigi Quinzi (Italy) Luca Vanni (United Kingdom) Jan Choinski
February 18	Morelos Open; Cuernavaca, Mexico; Challenger 80 – hard – 48S/4Q/16D; Singles – Doubles	(Argentina) Matías Franco Descotte; 6–1, 6–4	(Ecuador) Gonzalo Escobar	(United States) Evan King (Canada) Steven Diez	(Spain) Roberto Ortega Olmedo (Argentina) Renzo Olivo (Argentina) Facundo Mena (Ecuador) Roberto Quiroz
February 18	Morelos Open; Cuernavaca, Mexico; Challenger 80 – hard – 48S/4Q/16D; Singles – Doubles	(Sweden) André Göransson (Switzerland) Marc-Andrea Hüsler; 6–3, 3–6, [11–9]	(Ecuador) Gonzalo Escobar (Venezuela) Luis David Martínez	(United States) Evan King (Canada) Steven Diez	(Spain) Roberto Ortega Olmedo (Argentina) Renzo Olivo (Argentina) Facundo Mena (Ecuador) Roberto Quiroz
February 18	Bangkok Challenger II; Bangkok, Thailand; Challenger 80 – hard – 48S/4Q/16D; Singles – Doubles	(Australia) James Duckworth; 6–4, 6–3	(Spain) Alejandro Davidovich Fokina	(India) Prajnesh Gunneswaran (Israel) Dudi Sela	(Japan) Go Soeda (Italy) Gianluca Mager (Japan) Hiroki Moriya (China) Li Zhe
February 18	Bangkok Challenger II; Bangkok, Thailand; Challenger 80 – hard – 48S/4Q/16D; Singles – Doubles	(China) Li Zhe (Portugal) Gonçalo Oliveira; 6–2, 6–1	(Spain) Enrique López Pérez (Japan) Hiroki Moriya	(India) Prajnesh Gunneswaran (Israel) Dudi Sela	(Japan) Go Soeda (Italy) Gianluca Mager (Japan) Hiroki Moriya (China) Li Zhe
February 25	Oracle Challenger Series – Indian Wells; Indian Wells, United States; Challenger 125 – hard – 48S/4Q/16D; Singles – Doubles	(United Kingdom) Kyle Edmund; 6–3, 6–2	(Russia) Andrey Rublev	(South Africa) Lloyd Harris (United Kingdom) Dan Evans	(Germany) Yannick Maden (Italy) Salvatore Caruso (Australia) Alex Bolt (Chinese Taipei) Jason Jung
February 25	Oracle Challenger Series – Indian Wells; Indian Wells, United States; Challenger 125 – hard – 48S/4Q/16D; Singles – Doubles	(United States) JC Aragone (United States) Marcos Giron; 6–4, 6–4	(Barbados) Darian King (United States) Hunter Reese	(South Africa) Lloyd Harris (United Kingdom) Dan Evans	(Germany) Yannick Maden (Italy) Salvatore Caruso (Australia) Alex Bolt (Chinese Taipei) Jason Jung
February 25	Teréga Open Pau–Pyrénées; Pau, France; Challenger 90 – hard (i) – 48S/4Q/16D; Singles – Doubles	(Kazakhstan) Alexander Bublik; 5–7, 6–3, 6–3	(Slovakia) Norbert Gombos	(France) Grégoire Barrère (Belgium) Steve Darcis	(Russia) Roman Safiullin (France) Maxime Janvier (Austria) Sebastian Ofner (France) Quentin Halys
February 25	Teréga Open Pau–Pyrénées; Pau, France; Challenger 90 – hard (i) – 48S/4Q/16D; Singles – Doubles	(United Kingdom) Scott Clayton (Canada) Adil Shamasdin; 7–6^{(7–4)}, 5–7, [10–8]	(Netherlands) Sander Arends (Austria) Tristan-Samuel Weissborn	(France) Grégoire Barrère (Belgium) Steve Darcis	(Russia) Roman Safiullin (France) Maxime Janvier (Austria) Sebastian Ofner (France) Quentin Halys
February 25	Keio Challenger; Yokohama, Japan; Challenger 80 – hard – 48S/4Q/16D; Singles – Doubles	(South Korea) Kwon Soon-woo; 7–6^{(7–4)}, 6–3	(Germany) Oscar Otte	(Japan) Yūichi Sugita (Australia) Andrew Harris	(South Korea) Lee Duck-hee (Israel) Dudi Sela (Chinese Taipei) Yang Tsung-hua (Italy) Gianluca Mager
February 25	Keio Challenger; Yokohama, Japan; Challenger 80 – hard – 48S/4Q/16D; Singles – Doubles	(Tunisia) Moez Echargui (Tunisia) Skander Mansouri; 7–6^{(8–6)}, 6–7^{(3–7)}, [10–7]	(Australia) Max Purcell (Australia) Luke Saville	(Japan) Yūichi Sugita (Australia) Andrew Harris	(South Korea) Lee Duck-hee (Israel) Dudi Sela (Chinese Taipei) Yang Tsung-hua (Italy) Gianluca Mager

=== March ===
Week of	Tournament	Champions	Runners-up	Semifinalists	Quarterfinalists
March 4	Zhuhai Open; Zhuhai, China; Challenger 80 – hard – 48S/4Q/16D; Singles – Doubles	(Spain) Enrique López Pérez; 6–1, 6–4	(Russia) Evgeny Karlovskiy	(Japan) Kaichi Uchida (China) Zhang Ze	(Egypt) Mohamed Safwat (China) Wu Yibing (Japan) Hiroki Moriya (Cyprus) Marcos Baghdatis
March 4	Zhuhai Open; Zhuhai, China; Challenger 80 – hard – 48S/4Q/16D; Singles – Doubles	(China) Gong Maoxin (China) Zhang Ze; 6–4, 6–4	(Australia) Max Purcell (Australia) Luke Saville	(Japan) Kaichi Uchida (China) Zhang Ze	(Egypt) Mohamed Safwat (China) Wu Yibing (Japan) Hiroki Moriya (Cyprus) Marcos Baghdatis
March 4	Challenger ATP Cachantún Cup; Santiago, Chile; Challenger 80 – clay – 48S/4Q/16D; Singles – Doubles	(Bolivia) Hugo Dellien; 5–7, 7–6^{(7–1)}, 6–1	(Chinese Taipei) Wu Tung-lin	(Spain) Pablo Andújar (Brazil) Thomaz Bellucci	(Spain) Pedro Martínez (Brazil) Thiago Monteiro (Italy) Alessandro Giannessi (Belgium) Kimmer Coppejans
March 4	Challenger ATP Cachantún Cup; Santiago, Chile; Challenger 80 – clay – 48S/4Q/16D; Singles – Doubles	(Argentina) Franco Agamenone (Brazil) Fernando Romboli; 7–6^{(7–5)}, 1–6, [10–6]	(Argentina) Facundo Argüello (Uruguay) Martín Cuevas	(Spain) Pablo Andújar (Brazil) Thomaz Bellucci	(Spain) Pedro Martínez (Brazil) Thiago Monteiro (Italy) Alessandro Giannessi (Belgium) Kimmer Coppejans
March 11	Arizona Tennis Classic; Phoenix, United States; Challenger 125 – hard – 48S/4Q/16D; Singles – Doubles	(Italy) Matteo Berrettini; 3–6, 7–6^{(8–6)}, 7–6^{(7–2)}	(Kazakhstan) Mikhail Kukushkin	(Italy) Salvatore Caruso (Argentina) Guido Andreozzi	(Belgium) David Goffin (Chile) Nicolás Jarry (Australia) John Millman (Italy) Lorenzo Sonego
March 11	Arizona Tennis Classic; Phoenix, United States; Challenger 125 – hard – 48S/4Q/16D; Singles – Doubles	(United Kingdom) Jamie Murray (United Kingdom) Neal Skupski; 6–7^{(2–7)}, 7–5, [10–6]	(United States) Austin Krajicek (New Zealand) Artem Sitak	(Italy) Salvatore Caruso (Argentina) Guido Andreozzi	(Belgium) David Goffin (Chile) Nicolás Jarry (Australia) John Millman (Italy) Lorenzo Sonego
March 11	Challenger Banque Nationale de Drummondville; Drummondville, Canada; Challenger 80 – hard (i) – 48S/4Q/16D; Singles – Doubles	(Lithuania) Ričardas Berankis; 6–3, 7–5	(Germany) Yannick Maden	(Italy) Matteo Viola (United States) Michael Redlicki	(Denmark) Mikael Torpegaard (Belgium) Arthur De Greef (Estonia) Jürgen Zopp (Dominican Republic) Roberto Cid Subervi
March 11	Challenger Banque Nationale de Drummondville; Drummondville, Canada; Challenger 80 – hard (i) – 48S/4Q/16D; Singles – Doubles	(United Kingdom) Scott Clayton (Canada) Adil Shamasdin; 7–5, 3–6, [10–5]	(Australia) Matt Reid (Australia) John-Patrick Smith	(Italy) Matteo Viola (United States) Michael Redlicki	(Denmark) Mikael Torpegaard (Belgium) Arthur De Greef (Estonia) Jürgen Zopp (Dominican Republic) Roberto Cid Subervi
March 11	Pingshan Open; Shenzhen, China; Challenger 90 – hard – 48S/4Q/16D; Singles – Doubles	(Cyprus) Marcos Baghdatis; 6–2, 3–6, 6–4	(Italy) Stefano Napolitano	(Canada) Brayden Schnur (France) Baptiste Crepatte	(South Korea) Lee Duck-hee (Spain) Enrique López Pérez (Australia) Marc Polmans (South Korea) Kwon Soon-woo
March 11	Pingshan Open; Shenzhen, China; Challenger 90 – hard – 48S/4Q/16D; Singles – Doubles	(Chinese Taipei) Hsieh Cheng-peng (Indonesia) Christopher Rungkat; 6–4, 3–6, [10–6]	(China) Li Zhe (Portugal) Gonçalo Oliveira	(Canada) Brayden Schnur (France) Baptiste Crepatte	(South Korea) Lee Duck-hee (Spain) Enrique López Pérez (Australia) Marc Polmans (South Korea) Kwon Soon-woo
March 18	Play In Challenger; Lille, France; Challenger 80 – hard (i) – 48S/4Q/16D; Singles – Doubles	(France) Grégoire Barrère; 6–2, 4–6, 6–4	(Germany) Yannick Maden	(Austria) Sebastian Ofner (France) Quentin Halys	(Slovakia) Norbert Gombos (Russia) Aslan Karatsev (Germany) Tobias Kamke (United Kingdom) Jan Choinski
March 18	Play In Challenger; Lille, France; Challenger 80 – hard (i) – 48S/4Q/16D; Singles – Doubles	(Monaco) Romain Arneodo (France) Hugo Nys; 7–5, 5–7, [10–8]	(Israel) Jonathan Erlich (France) Fabrice Martin	(Austria) Sebastian Ofner (France) Quentin Halys	(Slovakia) Norbert Gombos (Russia) Aslan Karatsev (Germany) Tobias Kamke (United Kingdom) Jan Choinski
March 18	International Challenger Zhangjiagang; Zhangjiagang, China; Challenger 80 – hard – 48S/4Q/16D; Singles – Doubles	(Australia) Marc Polmans; 6–4, 4–6, 7–6^{(7–4)}	(Italy) Lorenzo Giustino	(Croatia) Viktor Galović (France) Mathias Bourgue	(Belarus) Uladzimir Ignatik (South Korea) Kwon Soon-woo (China) Zhang Ze (Italy) Stefano Napolitano
March 18	International Challenger Zhangjiagang; Zhangjiagang, China; Challenger 80 – hard – 48S/4Q/16D; Singles – Doubles	(Australia) Max Purcell (Australia) Luke Saville; 6–2, 7–6^{(7–5)}	(India) Sriram Balaji (Mexico) Hans Hach Verdugo	(Croatia) Viktor Galović (France) Mathias Bourgue	(Belarus) Uladzimir Ignatik (South Korea) Kwon Soon-woo (China) Zhang Ze (Italy) Stefano Napolitano
March 25	Open Harmonie mutuelle Saint-Brieuc, France; Challenger 80 – hard (i) – 48S/4Q/16D; Singles – Doubles	(Poland) Kamil Majchrzak; 6–3, 7–6^{(7–1)}	(France) Maxime Janvier	(Lithuania) Ričardas Berankis (France) Corentin Moutet	(France) Antoine Hoang (France) Grégoire Barrère (Russia) Evgeny Donskoy (France) Nicolas Mahut
March 25	Open Harmonie mutuelle Saint-Brieuc, France; Challenger 80 – hard (i) – 48S/4Q/16D; Singles – Doubles	(Israel) Jonathan Erlich (France) Fabrice Martin; 7–6^{(7–2)}, 7–6^{(7–2)}	(France) Jonathan Eysseric (Croatia) Antonio Šančić	(Lithuania) Ričardas Berankis (France) Corentin Moutet	(France) Antoine Hoang (France) Grégoire Barrère (Russia) Evgeny Donskoy (France) Nicolas Mahut
March 25	Casino Admiral Trophy; Marbella, Spain; Challenger 80 – clay – 48S/4Q/16D; Singles – Doubles	(Spain) Pablo Andújar; 4–6, 7–6^{(8–6)}, 6–4	(France) Benoît Paire	(Spain) Pedro Martínez (Spain) Alejandro Davidovich Fokina	(Italy) Alessandro Giannessi (Czech Republic) Jiří Veselý (Brazil) Thiago Monteiro (Italy) Gianluca Mager
March 25	Casino Admiral Trophy; Marbella, Spain; Challenger 80 – clay – 48S/4Q/16D; Singles – Doubles	(Germany) Kevin Krawietz (Germany) Andreas Mies; 7–6^{(8–6)}, 2–6, [10–6]	(Belgium) Sander Gillé (Belgium) Joran Vliegen	(Spain) Pedro Martínez (Spain) Alejandro Davidovich Fokina	(Italy) Alessandro Giannessi (Czech Republic) Jiří Veselý (Brazil) Thiago Monteiro (Italy) Gianluca Mager

=== April ===
Week of	Tournament	Champions	Runners-up	Semifinalists	Quarterfinalists
April 1	Monterrey Challenger; Monterrey, Mexico; Challenger 125 – hard – 48S/4Q/16D; Singles – Doubles	(Kazakhstan) Alexander Bublik; 6–3, 6–2	(Ecuador) Emilio Gómez	(United States) Tennys Sandgren (United States) Donald Young	(United States) Marcos Giron (Spain) Feliciano López (Canada) Peter Polansky (United States) Bradley Klahn
April 1	Monterrey Challenger; Monterrey, Mexico; Challenger 125 – hard – 48S/4Q/16D; Singles – Doubles	(United States) Evan King (United States) Nathan Pasha; 7–5, 6–2	(Mexico) Santiago González (Pakistan) Aisam-ul-Haq Qureshi	(United States) Tennys Sandgren (United States) Donald Young	(United States) Marcos Giron (Spain) Feliciano López (Canada) Peter Polansky (United States) Bradley Klahn
April 1	Verrazzano Open; Sophia Antipolis, France; Challenger 90 – clay – 48S/4Q/16D; Singles – Doubles	(Germany) Dustin Brown; 6–3, 7–5	(Serbia) Filip Krajinović	(Italy) Roberto Marcora (Germany) Rudolf Molleker	(Italy) Gianluca Mager (Italy) Filippo Baldi (Italy) Simone Bolelli (Italy) Matteo Donati
April 1	Verrazzano Open; Sophia Antipolis, France; Challenger 90 – clay – 48S/4Q/16D; Singles – Doubles	(Netherlands) Thiemo de Bakker (Netherlands) Robin Haase; 6–4, 6–4	(France) Enzo Couacaud (France) Tristan Lamasine	(Italy) Roberto Marcora (Germany) Rudolf Molleker	(Italy) Gianluca Mager (Italy) Filippo Baldi (Italy) Simone Bolelli (Italy) Matteo Donati
April 1	JC Ferrero Challenger Open; Alicante, Spain; Challenger 80 – clay – 48S/4Q/16D; Singles – Doubles	(Spain) Pablo Andújar; 6–3, 3–6, 6–3	(Spain) Pedro Martínez	(Spain) Carlos Taberner (Dominican Republic) José Hernández-Fernández	(Portugal) João Domingues (Italy) Salvatore Caruso (Portugal) Pedro Sousa (Spain) Mario Vilella Martínez
April 1	JC Ferrero Challenger Open; Alicante, Spain; Challenger 80 – clay – 48S/4Q/16D; Singles – Doubles	(Brazil) Thomaz Bellucci (Argentina) Guillermo Durán; 2–6, 7–5, [10–5]	(Spain) Gerard Granollers (Spain) Pedro Martínez	(Spain) Carlos Taberner (Dominican Republic) José Hernández-Fernández	(Portugal) João Domingues (Italy) Salvatore Caruso (Portugal) Pedro Sousa (Spain) Mario Vilella Martínez
April 8	Santaizi ATP Challenger; Taipei, Taiwan; Challenger 125 – hard (i) – 48S/4Q/16D; Singles – Doubles	(Austria) Dennis Novak; 6–2, 6–4	(Ukraine) Sergiy Stakhovsky	(South Korea) Kwon Soon-woo (Japan) Go Soeda	(India) Ramkumar Ramanathan (Japan) Yūichi Sugita (Japan) Tatsuma Ito (Chinese Taipei) Jason Jung
April 8	Santaizi ATP Challenger; Taipei, Taiwan; Challenger 125 – hard (i) – 48S/4Q/16D; Singles – Doubles	(India) Sriram Balaji (Israel) Jonathan Erlich; 6–3, 6–2	(Netherlands) Sander Arends (Austria) Tristan-Samuel Weissborn	(South Korea) Kwon Soon-woo (Japan) Go Soeda	(India) Ramkumar Ramanathan (Japan) Yūichi Sugita (Japan) Tatsuma Ito (Chinese Taipei) Jason Jung
April 8	Open Città della Disfida; Barletta, Italy; Challenger 80 – clay – 48S/4Q/16D; Singles – Doubles	(Italy) Gianluca Mager; 7–6^{(9–7)}, 5–7, 3–2 ret.	(Serbia) Nikola Milojević	(Egypt) Mohamed Safwat (Croatia) Viktor Galović	(Italy) Jacopo Berrettini (Argentina) Federico Coria (Slovakia) Filip Horanský (Italy) Stefano Napolitano
April 8	Open Città della Disfida; Barletta, Italy; Challenger 80 – clay – 48S/4Q/16D; Singles – Doubles	(Ukraine) Denys Molchanov (Slovakia) Igor Zelenay; 7–6^{(7–1)}, 6–4	(Bosnia and Herzegovina) Tomislav Brkić (Croatia) Tomislav Draganja	(Egypt) Mohamed Safwat (Croatia) Viktor Galović	(Italy) Jacopo Berrettini (Argentina) Federico Coria (Slovakia) Filip Horanský (Italy) Stefano Napolitano
April 8	Murcia Open; Murcia, Spain; Challenger 80 – clay – 48S/4Q/16D; Singles – Doubles	(Spain) Roberto Carballés Baena; 2–6, 6–0, 6–2	(Sweden) Mikael Ymer	(Netherlands) Tallon Griekspoor (Belgium) Kimmer Coppejans	(Italy) Salvatore Caruso (Germany) Rudolf Molleker (Spain) Bernabé Zapata Miralles (Spain) Enrique López Pérez
April 8	Murcia Open; Murcia, Spain; Challenger 80 – clay – 48S/4Q/16D; Singles – Doubles	(New Zealand) Marcus Daniell (Spain) David Marrero; 6–4, 6–4	(Australia) Rameez Junaid (Belarus) Andrei Vasilevski	(Netherlands) Tallon Griekspoor (Belgium) Kimmer Coppejans	(Italy) Salvatore Caruso (Germany) Rudolf Molleker (Spain) Bernabé Zapata Miralles (Spain) Enrique López Pérez
April 15	Kunming Open; Anning, China; Challenger 125 – clay – 48S/4Q/16D; Singles – Doubles	(United Kingdom) Jay Clarke; 6–4, 6–3	(India) Prajnesh Gunneswaran	(Portugal) Gonçalo Oliveira (Poland) Kamil Majchrzak	(Australia) James Duckworth (Australia) Alex Bolt (India) Ramkumar Ramanathan (Serbia) Nikola Milojević
April 15	Kunming Open; Anning, China; Challenger 125 – clay – 48S/4Q/16D; Singles – Doubles	(Australia) Max Purcell (Australia) Luke Saville; 4–6, 7–5, [10–5]	(Netherlands) David Pel (Chile) Hans Podlipnik Castillo	(Portugal) Gonçalo Oliveira (Poland) Kamil Majchrzak	(Australia) James Duckworth (Australia) Alex Bolt (India) Ramkumar Ramanathan (Serbia) Nikola Milojević
April 15	Sarasota Open; Sarasota, United States; Challenger 100 – clay – 48S/4Q/16D; Singles – Doubles	(United States) Tommy Paul; 6–3, 6–4	(United States) Tennys Sandgren	(Argentina) Andrea Collarini (United States) Marcos Giron	(Russia) Aslan Karatsev (Italy) Paolo Lorenzi (United States) Sebastian Korda (Canada) Peter Polansky
April 15	Sarasota Open; Sarasota, United States; Challenger 100 – clay – 48S/4Q/16D; Singles – Doubles	(Uruguay) Martín Cuevas (Italy) Paolo Lorenzi; 7–6^{(7–5)}, 7–6^{(8–6)}	(United Kingdom) Luke Bambridge (United Kingdom) Jonny O'Mara	(Argentina) Andrea Collarini (United States) Marcos Giron	(Russia) Aslan Karatsev (Italy) Paolo Lorenzi (United States) Sebastian Korda (Canada) Peter Polansky
April 15	Tunis Open; Tunis, Tunisia; Challenger 80 – clay – 48S/4Q/16D; Singles – Doubles	(Uruguay) Pablo Cuevas; 7–5, 6–4	(Portugal) João Domingues	(Italy) Lorenzo Giustino (Brazil) Thomaz Bellucci	(Spain) Daniel Gimeno Traver (Argentina) Facundo Argüello (Italy) Gian Marco Moroni (Hungary) Attila Balázs
April 15	Tunis Open; Tunis, Tunisia; Challenger 80 – clay – 48S/4Q/16D; Singles – Doubles	(Belgium) Ruben Bemelmans (Germany) Tim Pütz; 6–3, 6–1	(Argentina) Facundo Argüello (Argentina) Guillermo Durán	(Italy) Lorenzo Giustino (Brazil) Thomaz Bellucci	(Spain) Daniel Gimeno Traver (Argentina) Facundo Argüello (Italy) Gian Marco Moroni (Hungary) Attila Balázs
April 15	San Luis Open Challenger Tour; San Luis Potosí, Mexico; Challenger 80 – clay – 48S/4Q/16D; Singles – Doubles	(Switzerland) Marc-Andrea Hüsler; 7–5, 7–6^{(7–3)}	(Spain) Adrián Menéndez Maceiras	(Brazil) Pedro Sakamoto (Argentina) Facundo Mena	(Chile) Marcelo Tomás Barrios Vera (Austria) Lucas Miedler (Croatia) Ante Pavić (France) Alexandre Müller
April 15	San Luis Open Challenger Tour; San Luis Potosí, Mexico; Challenger 80 – clay – 48S/4Q/16D; Singles – Doubles	(El Salvador) Marcelo Arévalo (Mexico) Miguel Ángel Reyes-Varela; 1–6, 6–4, [12–10]	(Uruguay) Ariel Behar (Ecuador) Roberto Quiroz	(Brazil) Pedro Sakamoto (Argentina) Facundo Mena	(Chile) Marcelo Tomás Barrios Vera (Austria) Lucas Miedler (Croatia) Ante Pavić (France) Alexandre Müller
April 22	Torneo Internacional Challenger León; León, Mexico; Challenger 80 – hard – 48S/4Q/16D; Singles – Doubles	(Slovenia) Blaž Rola; 6–4, 4–6, 6–3	(United Kingdom) Liam Broady	(Kazakhstan) Alexander Bublik (United Kingdom) James Ward	(Ecuador) Roberto Quiroz (Austria) Sebastian Ofner (Ecuador) Gonzalo Escobar (El Salvador) Marcelo Arévalo
April 22	Torneo Internacional Challenger León; León, Mexico; Challenger 80 – hard – 48S/4Q/16D; Singles – Doubles	(Austria) Lucas Miedler (Austria) Sebastian Ofner; 4–6, 6–4, [10–6]	(Australia) Matt Reid (Australia) John-Patrick Smith	(Kazakhstan) Alexander Bublik (United Kingdom) James Ward	(Ecuador) Roberto Quiroz (Austria) Sebastian Ofner (Ecuador) Gonzalo Escobar (El Salvador) Marcelo Arévalo
April 22	Tallahassee Tennis Challenger; Tallahassee, United States; Challenger 80 – clay – 48S/4Q/16D; Singles – Doubles	(Ecuador) Emilio Gómez; 6–2, 6–2	(United States) Tommy Paul	(France) Corentin Moutet (United States) Tennys Sandgren	(Croatia) Nino Serdarušić (India) Sumit Nagal (Denmark) Mikael Torpegaard (United States) Noah Rubin
April 22	Tallahassee Tennis Challenger; Tallahassee, United States; Challenger 80 – clay – 48S/4Q/16D; Singles – Doubles	(Venezuela) Roberto Maytín (Brazil) Fernando Romboli; 6–2, 4–6, [10–7]	(United States) Thai-Son Kwiatkowski (United States) Noah Rubin	(France) Corentin Moutet (United States) Tennys Sandgren	(Croatia) Nino Serdarušić (India) Sumit Nagal (Denmark) Mikael Torpegaard (United States) Noah Rubin
April 22	Internazionali di Tennis d'Abruzzo; Francavilla al Mare, Italy; Challenger 80 – clay – 48S/4Q/16D; Singles – Doubles	(Italy) Stefano Travaglia; 6–3, 6–7^{(3–7)}, 6–3	(Germany) Oscar Otte	(Germany) Maximilian Marterer (Slovakia) Norbert Gombos	(Sweden) Mikael Ymer (Germany) Rudolf Molleker (Italy) Federico Gaio (Bosnia and Herzegovina) Tomislav Brkić
April 22	Internazionali di Tennis d'Abruzzo; Francavilla al Mare, Italy; Challenger 80 – clay – 48S/4Q/16D; Singles – Doubles	(Ukraine) Denys Molchanov (Slovakia) Igor Zelenay; 6–3, 6–2	(Argentina) Guillermo Durán (Spain) David Vega Hernández	(Germany) Maximilian Marterer (Slovakia) Norbert Gombos	(Sweden) Mikael Ymer (Germany) Rudolf Molleker (Italy) Federico Gaio (Bosnia and Herzegovina) Tomislav Brkić
April 22	ATP Challenger China International – Nanchang; Nanchang, China; Challenger 80 – clay (i) – 48S/4Q/16D; Singles – Doubles	(Slovakia) Andrej Martin; 6–4, 1–6, 6–3	(Australia) Jordan Thompson	(India) Ramkumar Ramanathan (Serbia) Nikola Milojević	(Japan) Go Soeda (China) Zhang Zhizhen (Israel) Ben Patael (Australia) Andrew Harris
April 22	ATP Challenger China International – Nanchang; Nanchang, China; Challenger 80 – clay (i) – 48S/4Q/16D; Singles – Doubles	(Netherlands) Sander Arends (Austria) Tristan-Samuel Weissborn; 6–2, 6–4	(Australia) Alex Bolt (Australia) Akira Santillan	(India) Ramkumar Ramanathan (Serbia) Nikola Milojević	(Japan) Go Soeda (China) Zhang Zhizhen (Israel) Ben Patael (Australia) Andrew Harris
April 29	BNP Paribas Primrose Bordeaux; Bordeaux, France; Challenger 110 – clay – 48S/4Q/16D; Singles – Doubles	(France) Lucas Pouille; 6–3, 6–3	(Sweden) Mikael Ymer	(France) Grégoire Barrère (Slovakia) Filip Horanský	(France) Quentin Halys (Italy) Gianluca Mager (France) Jo-Wilfried Tsonga (France) Adrian Mannarino
April 29	BNP Paribas Primrose Bordeaux; Bordeaux, France; Challenger 110 – clay – 48S/4Q/16D; Singles – Doubles	(France) Grégoire Barrère (France) Quentin Halys; 6–4, 6–1	(Monaco) Romain Arneodo (Monaco) Hugo Nys	(France) Grégoire Barrère (Slovakia) Filip Horanský	(France) Quentin Halys (Italy) Gianluca Mager (France) Jo-Wilfried Tsonga (France) Adrian Mannarino
April 29	Puerto Vallarta Open; Puerto Vallarta, Mexico; Challenger 110 – hard – 48S/4Q/16D; Singles – Doubles	(Austria) Sebastian Ofner; 7–6^{(10–8)}, 3–6, 6–3	(Australia) John-Patrick Smith	(Chile) Alejandro Tabilo (Bosnia and Herzegovina) Mirza Bašić	(Barbados) Darian King (Japan) Yusuke Takahashi (Slovenia) Blaž Rola (Austria) Lucas Miedler
April 29	Puerto Vallarta Open; Puerto Vallarta, Mexico; Challenger 110 – hard – 48S/4Q/16D; Singles – Doubles	(Australia) Matt Reid (Australia) John-Patrick Smith; 7–6^{(12–10)}, 6–3	(Ecuador) Gonzalo Escobar (Venezuela) Luis David Martínez	(Chile) Alejandro Tabilo (Bosnia and Herzegovina) Mirza Bašić	(Barbados) Darian King (Japan) Yusuke Takahashi (Slovenia) Blaž Rola (Austria) Lucas Miedler
April 29	Seoul Open Challenger; Seoul, South Korea; Challenger 100 – hard – 48S/4Q/16D; Singles – Doubles	(South Korea) Kwon Soon-woo; 7–5, 7–5	(Australia) Max Purcell	(Chinese Taipei) Wu Tung-lin (Serbia) Nikola Milojević	(Japan) Yasutaka Uchiyama (Australia) Alex Bolt (China) Li Zhe (Japan) Tatsuma Ito
April 29	Seoul Open Challenger; Seoul, South Korea; Challenger 100 – hard – 48S/4Q/16D; Singles – Doubles	(Australia) Max Purcell (Australia) Luke Saville; 6–4, 7–6^{(9–7)}	(Belgium) Ruben Bemelmans (Ukraine) Sergiy Stakhovsky	(Chinese Taipei) Wu Tung-lin (Serbia) Nikola Milojević	(Japan) Yasutaka Uchiyama (Australia) Alex Bolt (China) Li Zhe (Japan) Tatsuma Ito
April 29	Savannah Challenger; Savannah, United States; Challenger 90 – clay – 48S/4Q/16D; Singles – Doubles	(Argentina) Federico Coria; 6–3, 4–6, 6–2	(Italy) Paolo Lorenzi	(Australia) Aleksandar Vukic (India) Sumit Nagal	(France) Alexandre Müller (United States) Tommy Paul (France) Corentin Moutet (United States) Christopher Eubanks
April 29	Savannah Challenger; Savannah, United States; Challenger 90 – clay – 48S/4Q/16D; Singles – Doubles	(Venezuela) Roberto Maytín (Brazil) Fernando Romboli; 6–7^{(5–7)}, 6–4, [11–9]	(France) Manuel Guinard (France) Arthur Rinderknech	(Australia) Aleksandar Vukic (India) Sumit Nagal	(France) Alexandre Müller (United States) Tommy Paul (France) Corentin Moutet (United States) Christopher Eubanks
April 29	Prosperita Open; Ostrava, Czech Republic; Challenger 80 – clay – 48S/4Q/16D; Singles – Doubles	(Poland) Kamil Majchrzak; 6–1, 6–0	(Italy) Jannik Sinner	(South Africa) Lloyd Harris (Canada) Steven Diez	(Italy) Stefano Travaglia (Austria) Dennis Novak (Czech Republic) Tomáš Macháč (Czech Republic) Jiří Veselý
April 29	Prosperita Open; Ostrava, Czech Republic; Challenger 80 – clay – 48S/4Q/16D; Singles – Doubles	(Switzerland) Luca Margaroli (Slovakia) Filip Polášek; 6–4, 2–6, [10–8]	(Netherlands) Thiemo de Bakker (Netherlands) Tallon Griekspoor	(South Africa) Lloyd Harris (Canada) Steven Diez	(Italy) Stefano Travaglia (Austria) Dennis Novak (Czech Republic) Tomáš Macháč (Czech Republic) Jiří Veselý

=== May ===
Week of	Tournament	Champions	Runners-up	Semifinalists	Quarterfinalists
May 6	Open du Pays d'Aix; Aix-en-Provence, France; Challenger 125 – clay – 48S/4Q/16D; Singles – Doubles	(Uruguay) Pablo Cuevas; 7–5, 3–6, 6–2	(France) Quentin Halys	(Monaco) Hugo Nys (Russia) Alexey Vatutin	(Sweden) Elias Ymer (Germany) Daniel Masur (Germany) Benjamin Hassan (Italy) Gianluca Mager
May 6	Open du Pays d'Aix; Aix-en-Provence, France; Challenger 125 – clay – 48S/4Q/16D; Singles – Doubles	(Germany) Kevin Krawietz (Austria) Jürgen Melzer; 7–6^{(7–5)}, 6–2	(Denmark) Frederik Nielsen (Germany) Tim Pütz	(Monaco) Hugo Nys (Russia) Alexey Vatutin	(Sweden) Elias Ymer (Germany) Daniel Masur (Germany) Benjamin Hassan (Italy) Gianluca Mager
May 6	Busan Open; Busan, South Korea; Challenger 125 – hard – 48S/4Q/16D; Singles – Doubles	(Lithuania) Ričardas Berankis; 7–6^{(7–5)}, 6–2	(Australia) Andrew Harris	(Japan) Yasutaka Uchiyama (Australia) Akira Santillan	(South Korea) Chung Yun-seong (Japan) Tatsuma Ito (Russia) Evgeny Donskoy (Japan) Go Soeda
May 6	Busan Open; Busan, South Korea; Challenger 125 – hard – 48S/4Q/16D; Singles – Doubles	(Chinese Taipei) Hsieh Cheng-peng (Indonesia) Christopher Rungkat; 7–6^{(9–7)}, 6–1	(Japan) Toshihide Matsui (India) Vishnu Vardhan	(Japan) Yasutaka Uchiyama (Australia) Akira Santillan	(South Korea) Chung Yun-seong (Japan) Tatsuma Ito (Russia) Evgeny Donskoy (Japan) Go Soeda
May 6	Garden Open; Rome, Italy; Challenger 90 – clay – 48S/4Q/16D; Singles – Doubles	(Switzerland) Henri Laaksonen; 6–7^{(2–7)}, 7–6^{(7–2)}, 6–2	(Italy) Gian Marco Moroni	(Czech Republic) Adam Pavlásek (Italy) Paolo Lorenzi	(Poland) Kamil Majchrzak (Slovakia) Filip Horanský (Italy) Salvatore Caruso (Italy) Stefano Napolitano
May 6	Garden Open; Rome, Italy; Challenger 90 – clay – 48S/4Q/16D; Singles – Doubles	(Austria) Philipp Oswald (Slovakia) Filip Polášek; Walkover	(Serbia) Nikola Ćaćić (Czech Republic) Adam Pavlásek	(Czech Republic) Adam Pavlásek (Italy) Paolo Lorenzi	(Poland) Kamil Majchrzak (Slovakia) Filip Horanský (Italy) Salvatore Caruso (Italy) Stefano Napolitano
May 6	Braga Open; Braga, Portugal; Challenger 80 – clay – 48S/4Q/16D; Singles – Doubles	(Portugal) João Domingues; 6–7^{(5–7)}, 6–2, 6–3	(Argentina) Facundo Bagnis	(Spain) Bernabé Zapata Miralles (Czech Republic) Zdeněk Kolář	(Germany) Dominik Koepfer (Slovakia) Norbert Gombos (France) Geoffrey Blancaneaux (Netherlands) Tallon Griekspoor
May 6	Braga Open; Braga, Portugal; Challenger 80 – clay – 48S/4Q/16D; Singles – Doubles	(Spain) Gerard Granollers (Brazil) Fabrício Neis; 6–4, 6–3	(Belgium) Kimmer Coppejans (Czech Republic) Zdeněk Kolář	(Spain) Bernabé Zapata Miralles (Czech Republic) Zdeněk Kolář	(Germany) Dominik Koepfer (Slovakia) Norbert Gombos (France) Geoffrey Blancaneaux (Netherlands) Tallon Griekspoor
May 6	Shymkent Challenger; Shymkent, Kazakhstan; Challenger 80 – clay – 48S/4Q/16D; Singles – Doubles	(Slovakia) Andrej Martin; 5–7, 6–4, 6–4	(Kazakhstan) Dmitry Popko	(Belarus) Egor Gerasimov (Kazakhstan) Aleksandr Nedovyesov	(Dominican Republic) Roberto Cid Subervi (Chile) Marcelo Tomás Barrios Vera (Uzbekistan) Sanjar Fayziev (United Kingdom) Jay Clarke
May 6	Shymkent Challenger; Shymkent, Kazakhstan; Challenger 80 – clay – 48S/4Q/16D; Singles – Doubles	(Austria) Jurij Rodionov (Finland) Emil Ruusuvuori; 6–4, 3–6, [10–8]	(Portugal) Gonçalo Oliveira (Belarus) Andrei Vasilevski	(Belarus) Egor Gerasimov (Kazakhstan) Aleksandr Nedovyesov	(Dominican Republic) Roberto Cid Subervi (Chile) Marcelo Tomás Barrios Vera (Uzbekistan) Sanjar Fayziev (United Kingdom) Jay Clarke
May 13	Heilbronner Neckarcup; Heilbronn, Germany; Challenger 100 – clay – 48S/4Q/16D; Singles – Doubles	(Serbia) Filip Krajinović; 6–3, 6–1	(Belgium) Arthur De Greef	(Italy) Stefano Travaglia (Austria) Dennis Novak	(Serbia) Viktor Troicki (Bolivia) Hugo Dellien (Germany) Matthias Bachinger (Germany) Rudolf Molleker
May 13	Heilbronner Neckarcup; Heilbronn, Germany; Challenger 100 – clay – 48S/4Q/16D; Singles – Doubles	(Germany) Kevin Krawietz (Germany) Andreas Mies; 6–2, 6–4	(Germany) Andre Begemann (France) Fabrice Martin	(Italy) Stefano Travaglia (Austria) Dennis Novak	(Serbia) Viktor Troicki (Bolivia) Hugo Dellien (Germany) Matthias Bachinger (Germany) Rudolf Molleker
May 13	Lisboa Belém Open; Lisbon, Portugal; Challenger 80 – clay – 48S/4Q/16D; Singles – Doubles	(Spain) Roberto Carballés Baena; 2–6, 7–6^{(7–5)}, 6–1	(Argentina) Facundo Bagnis	(Italy) Lorenzo Giustino (Spain) Pedro Martínez	(Switzerland) Sandro Ehrat (Spain) Mario Vilella Martínez (Argentina) Guido Andreozzi (France) Elliot Benchetrit
May 13	Lisboa Belém Open; Lisbon, Portugal; Challenger 80 – clay – 48S/4Q/16D; Singles – Doubles	(Austria) Philipp Oswald (Slovakia) Filip Polášek; 7–5, 6–2	(Argentina) Guido Andreozzi (Argentina) Guillermo Durán	(Italy) Lorenzo Giustino (Spain) Pedro Martínez	(Switzerland) Sandro Ehrat (Spain) Mario Vilella Martínez (Argentina) Guido Andreozzi (France) Elliot Benchetrit
May 13	Gwangju Open; Gwangju, South Korea; Challenger 80 – hard – 48S/4Q/16D; Singles – Doubles	(Chinese Taipei) Jason Jung; 6–4, 6–2	(Israel) Dudi Sela	(Australia) Akira Santillan (South Korea) Kwon Soon-woo	(China) Li Zhe (Slovakia) Lukáš Lacko (Russia) Evgeny Donskoy (Chinese Taipei) Wu Tung-lin
May 13	Gwangju Open; Gwangju, South Korea; Challenger 80 – hard – 48S/4Q/16D; Singles – Doubles	(Chinese Taipei) Hsieh Cheng-peng (Indonesia) Christopher Rungkat; 6–3, 3–6, [10–6]	(South Korea) Nam Ji-sung (South Korea) Song Min-kyu	(Australia) Akira Santillan (South Korea) Kwon Soon-woo	(China) Li Zhe (Slovakia) Lukáš Lacko (Russia) Evgeny Donskoy (Chinese Taipei) Wu Tung-lin
May 13	Samarkand Challenger; Samarkand, Uzbekistan; Challenger 80 – clay – 48S/4Q/16D; Singles – Doubles	(Brazil) João Menezes; 7–6^{(7–2)}, 7–6^{(9–7)}	(France) Corentin Moutet	(Slovakia) Andrej Martin (India) Sumit Nagal	(Portugal) Gonçalo Oliveira (Dominican Republic) José Hernández-Fernández (Belarus) Uladzimir Ignatik (Spain) Roberto Ortega Olmedo
May 13	Samarkand Challenger; Samarkand, Uzbekistan; Challenger 80 – clay – 48S/4Q/16D; Singles – Doubles	(Portugal) Gonçalo Oliveira (Belarus) Andrei Vasilevski; 3–6, 6–3, [10–4]	(Uzbekistan) Sergey Fomin (Russia) Teymuraz Gabashvili	(Slovakia) Andrej Martin (India) Sumit Nagal	(Portugal) Gonçalo Oliveira (Dominican Republic) José Hernández-Fernández (Belarus) Uladzimir Ignatik (Spain) Roberto Ortega Olmedo
May 20	Jerusalem Volvo Open; Jerusalem, Israel; Challenger 80 – hard – 48S/4Q/16D; Singles – Doubles	(Serbia) Danilo Petrović; 7–6^{(7–3)}, 6–7^{(8–10)}, 6–1	(Canada) Filip Peliwo	(Canada) Brayden Schnur (India) Saketh Myneni	(France) Arthur Rinderknech (Norway) Viktor Durasovic (Israel) Edan Leshem (India) Sasikumar Mukund
May 20	Jerusalem Volvo Open; Jerusalem, Israel; Challenger 80 – hard – 48S/4Q/16D; Singles – Doubles	(Uruguay) Ariel Behar (Ecuador) Gonzalo Escobar; 6–4, 7–6^{(7–5)}	(United States) Evan King (Italy) Julian Ocleppo	(Canada) Brayden Schnur (India) Saketh Myneni	(France) Arthur Rinderknech (Norway) Viktor Durasovic (Israel) Edan Leshem (India) Sasikumar Mukund
May 27	Internazionali di Tennis Città di Vicenza; Vicenza, Italy; Challenger 80 – clay – 48S/4Q/16D; Singles – Doubles	(Italy) Alessandro Giannessi; 7–5, 6–2	(Italy) Filippo Baldi	(Italy) Gianluca Mager (Germany) Benjamin Hassan	(Italy) Francesco Forti (Australia) Marc Polmans (Argentina) Facundo Bagnis (Italy) Andrea Pellegrino
May 27	Internazionali di Tennis Città di Vicenza; Vicenza, Italy; Challenger 80 – clay – 48S/4Q/16D; Singles – Doubles	(Portugal) Gonçalo Oliveira (Belarus) Andrei Vasilevski; 6–3, 6–4	(Brazil) Fabrício Neis (Brazil) Fernando Romboli	(Italy) Gianluca Mager (Germany) Benjamin Hassan	(Italy) Francesco Forti (Australia) Marc Polmans (Argentina) Facundo Bagnis (Italy) Andrea Pellegrino

=== June ===
Week of	Tournament	Champions	Runners-up	Semifinalists	Quarterfinalists
June 3	Surbiton Trophy; Surbiton, United Kingdom; Challenger 125 – grass – 48S/4Q/16D; Singles – Doubles	(United Kingdom) Dan Evans; 6–2, 6–3	(Serbia) Viktor Troicki	(United States) Denis Kudla (Romania) Marius Copil	(Croatia) Ivo Karlović (Germany) Matthias Bachinger (Spain) Marcel Granollers (Australia) Matthew Ebden
June 3	Surbiton Trophy; Surbiton, United Kingdom; Challenger 125 – grass – 48S/4Q/16D; Singles – Doubles	(Spain) Marcel Granollers (Japan) Ben McLachlan; 4–6, 6–3, [10–2]	(South Korea) Kwon Soon-woo (India) Ramkumar Ramanathan	(United States) Denis Kudla (Romania) Marius Copil	(Croatia) Ivo Karlović (Germany) Matthias Bachinger (Spain) Marcel Granollers (Australia) Matthew Ebden
June 3	Moneta Czech Open; Prostějov, Czech Republic; Challenger 100 – clay – 48S/4Q/16D; Singles – Doubles	(Spain) Pablo Andújar; 6–2, 7–5	(Hungary) Attila Balázs	(Norway) Casper Ruud (Germany) Peter Torebko	(Italy) Federico Gaio (Germany) Benjamin Hassan (Spain) Bernabé Zapata Miralles (El Salvador) Marcelo Arévalo
June 3	Moneta Czech Open; Prostějov, Czech Republic; Challenger 100 – clay – 48S/4Q/16D; Singles – Doubles	(Austria) Philipp Oswald (Slovakia) Filip Polášek; 6–4, 7–6^{(7–4)}	(Czech Republic) Jiří Lehečka (Czech Republic) Jiří Veselý	(Norway) Casper Ruud (Germany) Peter Torebko	(Italy) Federico Gaio (Germany) Benjamin Hassan (Spain) Bernabé Zapata Miralles (El Salvador) Marcelo Arévalo
June 3	Poznań Open; Poznań, Poland; Challenger 90 – clay – 48S/4Q/16D; Singles – Doubles	(Spain) Tommy Robredo; 5–7, 6–4, 6–1	(Germany) Rudolf Molleker	(Poland) Hubert Hurkacz (Italy) Andrea Vavassori	(Portugal) Pedro Sousa (France) Quentin Halys (Italy) Gianluca Mager (Italy) Alessandro Giannessi
June 3	Poznań Open; Poznań, Poland; Challenger 90 – clay – 48S/4Q/16D; Singles – Doubles	(Italy) Andrea Vavassori (Spain) David Vega Hernández; 6–4, 6–7^{(4–7)}, [10–6]	(Spain) Pedro Martínez (Netherlands) Mark Vervoort	(Poland) Hubert Hurkacz (Italy) Andrea Vavassori	(Portugal) Pedro Sousa (France) Quentin Halys (Italy) Gianluca Mager (Italy) Alessandro Giannessi
June 3	Almaty Challenger; Almaty, Kazakhstan; Challenger 80 – clay – 48S/4Q/16D; Singles – Doubles	(Italy) Lorenzo Giustino; 6–4, 6–4	(Argentina) Federico Coria	(Spain) Mario Vilella Martínez (Germany) Yannick Hanfmann	(Chile) Alejandro Tabilo (Serbia) Nikola Milojević (Slovakia) Andrej Martin (Kazakhstan) Aleksandr Nedovyesov
June 3	Almaty Challenger; Almaty, Kazakhstan; Challenger 80 – clay – 48S/4Q/16D; Singles – Doubles	(Slovakia) Andrej Martin (Chile) Hans Podlipnik Castillo; 7–6^{(7–4)}, 3–6, [10–8]	(Portugal) Gonçalo Oliveira (Belarus) Andrei Vasilevski	(Spain) Mario Vilella Martínez (Germany) Yannick Hanfmann	(Chile) Alejandro Tabilo (Serbia) Nikola Milojević (Slovakia) Andrej Martin (Kazakhstan) Aleksandr Nedovyesov
June 3	Little Rock Challenger; Little Rock, United States; Challenger 90 – hard – 48S/4Q/16D; Singles – Doubles	(Israel) Dudi Sela; 6–1, 4–3 ret.	(South Korea) Lee Duck-hee	(United States) Thai-Son Kwiatkowski (Barbados) Darian King	(United States) Ryan Shane (United States) Christopher Eubanks (United States) Mitchell Krueger (United States) Raymond Sarmiento
June 3	Little Rock Challenger; Little Rock, United States; Challenger 90 – hard – 48S/4Q/16D; Singles – Doubles	(Argentina) Matías Franco Descotte (Brazil) Orlando Luz; 7–5, 1–6, [12–10]	(Philippines) Treat Huey (United States) Max Schnur	(United States) Thai-Son Kwiatkowski (Barbados) Darian King	(United States) Ryan Shane (United States) Christopher Eubanks (United States) Mitchell Krueger (United States) Raymond Sarmiento
June 10	Nottingham Open; Nottingham, United Kingdom; Challenger 125 – grass – 48S/4Q/16D; Singles – Doubles	(United Kingdom) Dan Evans; 7–6^{(7–3)}, 6–3	(Russia) Evgeny Donskoy	(Japan) Go Soeda (France) Antoine Hoang	(Germany) Dominik Koepfer (Czech Republic) Lukáš Rosol (Austria) Dennis Novak (Belgium) Ruben Bemelmans
June 10	Nottingham Open; Nottingham, United Kingdom; Challenger 125 – grass – 48S/4Q/16D; Singles – Doubles	(Mexico) Santiago González (Pakistan) Aisam-ul-Haq Qureshi; 4–6, 7–6^{(7–5)}, [10–5]	(China) Gong Maoxin (China) Zhang Ze	(Japan) Go Soeda (France) Antoine Hoang	(Germany) Dominik Koepfer (Czech Republic) Lukáš Rosol (Austria) Dennis Novak (Belgium) Ruben Bemelmans
June 10	Open Sopra Steria de Lyon; Lyon, France; Challenger 100 – clay – 48S/4Q/16D; Singles – Doubles	(France) Corentin Moutet; 6–4, 6–4	(Sweden) Elias Ymer	(India) Sumit Nagal (Italy) Federico Gaio	(Spain) Albert Ramos Viñolas (Belgium) Kimmer Coppejans (Egypt) Mohamed Safwat (France) Manuel Guinard
June 10	Open Sopra Steria de Lyon; Lyon, France; Challenger 100 – clay – 48S/4Q/16D; Singles – Doubles	(Austria) Philipp Oswald (Slovakia) Filip Polášek; 6–4, 7–6^{(7–2)}	(Italy) Simone Bolelli (Italy) Andrea Pellegrino	(India) Sumit Nagal (Italy) Federico Gaio	(Spain) Albert Ramos Viñolas (Belgium) Kimmer Coppejans (Egypt) Mohamed Safwat (France) Manuel Guinard
June 10	Shymkent Challenger II; Shymkent, Kazakhstan; Challenger 80 – clay – 48S/4Q/16D; Singles – Doubles	(Slovakia) Andrej Martin; 6–4, 6–4	(Italy) Stefano Travaglia	(Chile) Alejandro Tabilo (Argentina) Federico Coria	(Spain) Daniel Gimeno Traver (Kazakhstan) Aleksandr Nedovyesov (Italy) Lorenzo Giustino (Spain) Nicola Kuhn
June 10	Shymkent Challenger II; Shymkent, Kazakhstan; Challenger 80 – clay – 48S/4Q/16D; Singles – Doubles	(Serbia) Nikola Ćaćić (Chinese Taipei) Yang Tsung-hua; 6–4, 6–4	(Sweden) André Göransson (Switzerland) Marc-Andrea Hüsler	(Chile) Alejandro Tabilo (Argentina) Federico Coria	(Spain) Daniel Gimeno Traver (Kazakhstan) Aleksandr Nedovyesov (Italy) Lorenzo Giustino (Spain) Nicola Kuhn
June 10	Columbus Challenger II; Columbus, United States; Challenger 80 – hard – 48S/4Q/16D; Singles – Doubles	(Denmark) Mikael Torpegaard; 6–1, 7–5	(South Korea) Nam Ji-sung	(Israel) Dudi Sela (United States) Thai-Son Kwiatkowski	(China) Zhang Zhizhen (Brazil) João Menezes (Ecuador) Emilio Gómez (Japan) Yasutaka Uchiyama
June 10	Columbus Challenger II; Columbus, United States; Challenger 80 – hard – 48S/4Q/16D; Singles – Doubles	(Venezuela) Roberto Maytín (United States) Jackson Withrow; 6–7^{(4–7)}, 7–6^{(7–2)}, [10–5]	(Mexico) Hans Hach Verdugo (United States) Donald Young	(Israel) Dudi Sela (United States) Thai-Son Kwiatkowski	(China) Zhang Zhizhen (Brazil) João Menezes (Ecuador) Emilio Gómez (Japan) Yasutaka Uchiyama
June 17	Ilkley Trophy; Ilkley, United Kingdom; Challenger 125 – grass – 48S/4Q/16D; Singles – Doubles	(Germany) Dominik Koepfer; 3–6, 6–3, 7–6^{(7–5)}	(Austria) Dennis Novak	(Poland) Kamil Majchrzak (Japan) Go Soeda	(France) Antoine Hoang (Czech Republic) Lukáš Rosol (Spain) Marcel Granollers (France) Ugo Humbert
June 17	Ilkley Trophy; Ilkley, United Kingdom; Challenger 125 – grass – 48S/4Q/16D; Singles – Doubles	(Mexico) Santiago González (Pakistan) Aisam-ul-Haq Qureshi; 6–3, 6–4	(New Zealand) Marcus Daniell (India) Leander Paes	(Poland) Kamil Majchrzak (Japan) Go Soeda	(France) Antoine Hoang (Czech Republic) Lukáš Rosol (Spain) Marcel Granollers (France) Ugo Humbert
June 17	Bratislava Open; Bratislava, Slovakia; Challenger 90 – clay – 48S/4Q/16D; Singles – Doubles	(Slovakia) Norbert Gombos; 6–3, 3–6, 6–2	(Hungary) Attila Balázs	(India) Sumit Nagal (Slovenia) Blaž Rola	(Slovakia) Andrej Martin (Slovakia) Jozef Kovalík (Czech Republic) Václav Šafránek (Egypt) Mohamed Safwat
June 17	Bratislava Open; Bratislava, Slovakia; Challenger 90 – clay – 48S/4Q/16D; Singles – Doubles	(Belgium) Sander Gillé (Belgium) Joran Vliegen; 6–2, 7–5	(Slovakia) Lukáš Klein (Slovakia) Alex Molčan	(India) Sumit Nagal (Slovenia) Blaž Rola	(Slovakia) Andrej Martin (Slovakia) Jozef Kovalík (Czech Republic) Václav Šafránek (Egypt) Mohamed Safwat
June 17	Fergana Challenger; Fergana, Uzbekistan; Challenger 80 – hard – 48S/4Q/16D; Singles – Doubles	(Finland) Emil Ruusuvuori; 6–3, 6–2	(Dominican Republic) Roberto Cid Subervi	(Uzbekistan) Khumoyun Sultanov (Turkey) Cem İlkel	(Russia) Pavel Kotov (United States) Evan King (Australia) Aleksandar Vukic (France) Gleb Sakharov
June 17	Fergana Challenger; Fergana, Uzbekistan; Challenger 80 – hard – 48S/4Q/16D; Singles – Doubles	(United States) Evan King (United States) Hunter Reese; 6–3, 5–7, [10–4]	(Serbia) Nikola Ćaćić (Chinese Taipei) Yang Tsung-hua	(Uzbekistan) Khumoyun Sultanov (Turkey) Cem İlkel	(Russia) Pavel Kotov (United States) Evan King (Australia) Aleksandar Vukic (France) Gleb Sakharov
June 17	Internationaux de Tennis de Blois; Blois, France; Challenger 80 – clay – 48S/4Q/16D; Singles – Doubles	(Portugal) Pedro Sousa; 4–6, 6–3, 7–6^{(7–4)}	(Belgium) Kimmer Coppejans	(Italy) Lorenzo Giustino (Argentina) Facundo Argüello	(France) Tristan Lamasine (Colombia) Daniel Elahi Galán (Spain) Oriol Roca Batalla (France) Johan Tatlot
June 17	Internationaux de Tennis de Blois; Blois, France; Challenger 80 – clay – 48S/4Q/16D; Singles – Doubles	(France) Corentin Denolly (France) Alexandre Müller; 7–5, 6–7^{(5–7)}, [10–6]	(Peru) Sergio Galdós (Sweden) Andreas Siljeström	(Italy) Lorenzo Giustino (Argentina) Facundo Argüello	(France) Tristan Lamasine (Colombia) Daniel Elahi Galán (Spain) Oriol Roca Batalla (France) Johan Tatlot
June 17	Internazionali di Tennis Emilia Romagna; Parma, Italy; Challenger 80 – clay – 48S/4Q/16D; Singles – Doubles	(Spain) Tommy Robredo; 7–6^{(12–10)}, 5–7, 7–6^{(8–6)}	(Italy) Federico Gaio	(Germany) Julian Lenz (Italy) Giulio Zeppieri	(Argentina) Andrea Collarini (Italy) Jacopo Berrettini (Italy) Stefano Travaglia (Uruguay) Martín Cuevas
June 17	Internazionali di Tennis Emilia Romagna; Parma, Italy; Challenger 80 – clay – 48S/4Q/16D; Singles – Doubles	(Lithuania) Laurynas Grigelis (Italy) Andrea Pellegrino; 1–6, 6–3, [10–7]	(Uruguay) Ariel Behar (Ecuador) Gonzalo Escobar	(Germany) Julian Lenz (Italy) Giulio Zeppieri	(Argentina) Andrea Collarini (Italy) Jacopo Berrettini (Italy) Stefano Travaglia (Uruguay) Martín Cuevas
June 24	Aspria Tennis Cup; Milan, Italy; Challenger 80 – clay – 48S/4Q/16D; Singles – Doubles	(Bolivia) Hugo Dellien; 7–5, 6–4	(Serbia) Danilo Petrović	(Italy) Lorenzo Musetti (India) Sumit Nagal	(Spain) Tommy Robredo (El Salvador) Marcelo Arévalo (Portugal) Frederico Ferreira Silva (Russia) Aslan Karatsev
June 24	Aspria Tennis Cup; Milan, Italy; Challenger 80 – clay – 48S/4Q/16D; Singles – Doubles	(Bosnia and Herzegovina) Tomislav Brkić (Croatia) Ante Pavić; 7–6^{(8–6)}, 6–2	(Belarus) Andrei Vasilevski (Italy) Andrea Vavassori	(Italy) Lorenzo Musetti (India) Sumit Nagal	(Spain) Tommy Robredo (El Salvador) Marcelo Arévalo (Portugal) Frederico Ferreira Silva (Russia) Aslan Karatsev

=== July ===
Week of	Tournament	Champions	Runners-up	Semifinalists	Quarterfinalists
July 1	Ludwigshafen Challenger; Ludwigshafen, Germany; Challenger 80 – clay – 56S/4Q/16D; Singles – Doubles	(Germany) Yannick Hanfmann; 6–3, 6–1	(Slovakia) Filip Horanský	(Slovakia) Alex Molčan (Italy) Stefano Travaglia	(France) Constant Lestienne (Argentina) Facundo Bagnis (Sweden) Elias Ymer (Spain) Bernabé Zapata Miralles
July 1	Ludwigshafen Challenger; Ludwigshafen, Germany; Challenger 80 – clay – 56S/4Q/16D; Singles – Doubles	(United States) Nathaniel Lammons (Brazil) Fernando Romboli; 7–6^{(7–4)}, 6–1	(Portugal) João Domingues (Portugal) Pedro Sousa	(Slovakia) Alex Molčan (Italy) Stefano Travaglia	(France) Constant Lestienne (Argentina) Facundo Bagnis (Sweden) Elias Ymer (Spain) Bernabé Zapata Miralles
July 1	Guzzini Challenger; Recanati, Italy; Challenger 80 – hard – 48S/4Q/16D; Singles – Doubles	(Belarus) Egor Gerasimov; 6–2, 7–5	(Italy) Roberto Marcora	(Germany) Mats Moraing (Slovakia) Lukáš Lacko	(Austria) Jurij Rodionov (India) Ramkumar Ramanathan (Croatia) Viktor Galović (France) Kenny de Schepper
July 1	Guzzini Challenger; Recanati, Italy; Challenger 80 – hard – 48S/4Q/16D; Singles – Doubles	(Portugal) Gonçalo Oliveira (India) Ramkumar Ramanathan; 6–2, 6–4	(Italy) Andrea Vavassori (Spain) David Vega Hernández	(Germany) Mats Moraing (Slovakia) Lukáš Lacko	(Austria) Jurij Rodionov (India) Ramkumar Ramanathan (Croatia) Viktor Galović (France) Kenny de Schepper
July 8	Sparkassen Open; Braunschweig, Germany; Challenger 90 – clay – 48S/4Q/16D; Singles – Doubles	(Brazil) Thiago Monteiro; 7–6^{(8–6)}, 6–1	(Germany) Tobias Kamke	(Switzerland) Henri Laaksonen (Spain) Javier Barranco Cosano	(Norway) Casper Ruud (Czech Republic) Lukáš Rosol (Hungary) Attila Balázs (Slovakia) Jozef Kovalík
July 8	Sparkassen Open; Braunschweig, Germany; Challenger 90 – clay – 48S/4Q/16D; Singles – Doubles	(Italy) Simone Bolelli (Argentina) Guillermo Durán; 6–3, 6–2	(United States) Nathaniel Lammons (Croatia) Antonio Šančić	(Switzerland) Henri Laaksonen (Spain) Javier Barranco Cosano	(Norway) Casper Ruud (Czech Republic) Lukáš Rosol (Hungary) Attila Balázs (Slovakia) Jozef Kovalík
July 8	Nielsen Pro Tennis Championship; Winnetka, United States; Challenger 80 – hard – 48S/4Q/16D; Singles – Doubles	(United States) Bradley Klahn; 6–2, 7–5	(Australia) Jason Kubler	(Uzbekistan) Denis Istomin (Australia) Thanasi Kokkinakis	(United States) Bjorn Fratangelo (India) Ramkumar Ramanathan (Chinese Taipei) Jason Jung (United States) Christopher Eubanks
July 8	Nielsen Pro Tennis Championship; Winnetka, United States; Challenger 80 – hard – 48S/4Q/16D; Singles – Doubles	(United States) JC Aragone (United States) Bradley Klahn; 7–5, 6–4	(United States) Christopher Eubanks (United States) Thai-Son Kwiatkowski	(Uzbekistan) Denis Istomin (Australia) Thanasi Kokkinakis	(United States) Bjorn Fratangelo (India) Ramkumar Ramanathan (Chinese Taipei) Jason Jung (United States) Christopher Eubanks
July 8	Internazionali di Tennis Città di Perugia; Perugia, Italy; Challenger 80 – clay – 48S/4Q/16D; Singles – Doubles	(Argentina) Federico Delbonis; 6–0, 1–6, 7–6^{(7–5)}	(Spain) Guillermo García López	(Colombia) Daniel Elahi Galán (Spain) Albert Ramos Viñolas	(Italy) Federico Gaio (Italy) Gian Marco Moroni (Italy) Alessandro Giannessi (Italy) Gianluigi Quinzi
July 8	Internazionali di Tennis Città di Perugia; Perugia, Italy; Challenger 80 – clay – 48S/4Q/16D; Singles – Doubles	(Bosnia and Herzegovina) Tomislav Brkić (Croatia) Ante Pavić; 6–4, 6–3	(Brazil) Rogério Dutra Silva (Poland) Szymon Walków	(Colombia) Daniel Elahi Galán (Spain) Albert Ramos Viñolas	(Italy) Federico Gaio (Italy) Gian Marco Moroni (Italy) Alessandro Giannessi (Italy) Gianluigi Quinzi
July 8	Winnipeg National Bank Challenger; Winnipeg, Canada; Challenger 80 – hard – 48S/4Q/16D; Singles – Doubles	(Slovakia) Norbert Gombos; 7–6^{(7–3)}, 6–3	(Canada) Brayden Schnur	(Japan) Hiroki Moriya (United States) Daniel Nguyen	(China) Li Zhe (Turkey) Cem İlkel (United States) Maxime Cressy (France) Antoine Hoang
July 8	Winnipeg National Bank Challenger; Winnipeg, Canada; Challenger 80 – hard – 48S/4Q/16D; Singles – Doubles	(Barbados) Darian King (Canada) Peter Polansky; 7–6^{(10–8)}, 6–3	(United States) Hunter Reese (Canada) Adil Shamasdin	(Japan) Hiroki Moriya (United States) Daniel Nguyen	(China) Li Zhe (Turkey) Cem İlkel (United States) Maxime Cressy (France) Antoine Hoang
July 15	President's Cup; Nur-Sultan, Kazakhstan; Challenger 110 – hard – 48S/4Q/16D; Singles – Doubles	(Russia) Evgeny Donskoy; 7–6^{(7–5)}, 3–6, 6–4	(United States) Sebastian Korda	(Uzbekistan) Khumoyun Sultanov (Australia) Aleksandar Vukic	(Portugal) Gastão Elias (Belarus) Egor Gerasimov (South Korea) Chung Yun-seong (Italy) Matteo Viola
July 15	President's Cup; Nur-Sultan, Kazakhstan; Challenger 110 – hard – 48S/4Q/16D; Singles – Doubles	(Kazakhstan) Andrey Golubev (Kazakhstan) Aleksandr Nedovyesov; 6–4, 6–4	(South Korea) Chung Yun-seong (South Korea) Nam Ji-sung	(Uzbekistan) Khumoyun Sultanov (Australia) Aleksandar Vukic	(Portugal) Gastão Elias (Belarus) Egor Gerasimov (South Korea) Chung Yun-seong (Italy) Matteo Viola
July 15	San Benedetto Tennis Cup; San Benedetto del Tronto, Italy; Challenger 80 – clay – 48S/4Q/16D; Singles – Doubles	(Argentina) Renzo Olivo; 5–7, 7–6^{(7–4)}, 6–4	(Italy) Alessandro Giannessi	(Slovakia) Andrej Martin (Italy) Federico Gaio	(Spain) Oriol Roca Batalla (Italy) Andrea Arnaboldi (Italy) Roberto Marcora (Czech Republic) Jan Šátral
July 15	San Benedetto Tennis Cup; San Benedetto del Tronto, Italy; Challenger 80 – clay – 48S/4Q/16D; Singles – Doubles	(Croatia) Ivan Sabanov (Croatia) Matej Sabanov; 6–4, 4–6, [10–5]	(Peru) Sergio Galdós (Peru) Juan Pablo Varillas	(Slovakia) Andrej Martin (Italy) Federico Gaio	(Spain) Oriol Roca Batalla (Italy) Andrea Arnaboldi (Italy) Roberto Marcora (Czech Republic) Jan Šátral
July 15	Dutch Open; Amersfoort, Netherlands; Challenger 80 – clay – 48S/4Q/16D; Singles – Doubles	(Germany) Mats Moraing; 6–2, 3–6, 6–3	(Belgium) Kimmer Coppejans	(Netherlands) Igor Sijsling (Slovenia) Blaž Rola	(Spain) Pedro Martínez (Spain) Daniel Gimeno Traver (Czech Republic) Zdeněk Kolář (Germany) Daniel Masur
July 15	Dutch Open; Amersfoort, Netherlands; Challenger 80 – clay – 48S/4Q/16D; Singles – Doubles	(Finland) Harri Heliövaara (Finland) Emil Ruusuvuori; 6–3, 6–4	(Netherlands) Jesper de Jong (Netherlands) Ryan Nijboer	(Netherlands) Igor Sijsling (Slovenia) Blaž Rola	(Spain) Pedro Martínez (Spain) Daniel Gimeno Traver (Czech Republic) Zdeněk Kolář (Germany) Daniel Masur
July 15	Challenger Banque Nationale de Gatineau; Gatineau, Canada; Challenger 80 – hard – 48S/4Q/16D; Singles – Doubles	(Australia) Jason Kubler; 6–4, 6–4	(France) Enzo Couacaud	(Brazil) João Menezes (Barbados) Darian King	(South Korea) Lee Duck-hee (Slovakia) Norbert Gombos (France) Maxime Janvier (Australia) Marc Polmans
July 15	Challenger Banque Nationale de Gatineau; Gatineau, Canada; Challenger 80 – hard – 48S/4Q/16D; Singles – Doubles	(United States) Alex Lawson (Australia) Marc Polmans; 6–4, 3–6, [10–7]	(Mexico) Hans Hach Verdugo (United States) Dennis Novikov	(Brazil) João Menezes (Barbados) Darian King	(South Korea) Lee Duck-hee (Slovakia) Norbert Gombos (France) Maxime Janvier (Australia) Marc Polmans
July 22	Challenger Banque Nationale de Granby; Granby, Canada; Challenger 90 – hard – 48S/4Q/16D; Singles – Doubles	(United States) Ernesto Escobedo; 7–6^{(7–5)}, 6–4	(Japan) Yasutaka Uchiyama	(Croatia) Borna Gojo (Canada) Peter Polansky	(Japan) Hiroki Moriya (France) Enzo Couacaud (China) Li Zhe (Canada) Steven Diez
July 22	Challenger Banque Nationale de Granby; Granby, Canada; Challenger 90 – hard – 48S/4Q/16D; Singles – Doubles	(Sweden) André Göransson (Netherlands) Sem Verbeek; 6–2, 6–4	(China) Li Zhe (Monaco) Hugo Nys	(Croatia) Borna Gojo (Canada) Peter Polansky	(Japan) Hiroki Moriya (France) Enzo Couacaud (China) Li Zhe (Canada) Steven Diez
July 22	Levene Gouldin & Thompson Tennis Challenger; Binghamton, United States; Challenger 80 – hard – 48S/4Q/16D; Singles – Doubles	(Japan) Yūichi Sugita; 7–6^{(7–2)}, 1–6, 6–2	(Brazil) João Menezes	(United States) Mitchell Krueger (Russia) Evgeny Karlovskiy	(Australia) Max Purcell (Israel) Dudi Sela (South Korea) Lee Duck-hee (United States) Maxime Cressy
July 22	Levene Gouldin & Thompson Tennis Challenger; Binghamton, United States; Challenger 80 – hard – 48S/4Q/16D; Singles – Doubles	(Australia) Max Purcell (Australia) Luke Saville; 6–4, 4–6, [10–5]	(United States) JC Aragone (United States) Alex Lawson	(United States) Mitchell Krueger (Russia) Evgeny Karlovskiy	(Australia) Max Purcell (Israel) Dudi Sela (South Korea) Lee Duck-hee (United States) Maxime Cressy
July 22	Advantage Cars Prague Open; Prague, Czech Republic; Challenger 80 – clay – 48S/4Q/16D; Singles – Doubles	(Spain) Mario Vilella Martínez; 6–4, 6–2	(Chinese Taipei) Tseng Chun-hsin	(Portugal) Frederico Ferreira Silva (Spain) Carlos Taberner	(Spain) Bernabé Zapata Miralles (Slovakia) Lukáš Klein (Italy) Lorenzo Giustino (Czech Republic) Lukáš Rosol
July 22	Advantage Cars Prague Open; Prague, Czech Republic; Challenger 80 – clay – 48S/4Q/16D; Singles – Doubles	(Uruguay) Ariel Behar (Ecuador) Gonzalo Escobar; 6–7^{(4–7)}, 7–5, [10–8]	(Kazakhstan) Andrey Golubev (Kazakhstan) Aleksandr Nedovyesov	(Portugal) Frederico Ferreira Silva (Spain) Carlos Taberner	(Spain) Bernabé Zapata Miralles (Slovakia) Lukáš Klein (Italy) Lorenzo Giustino (Czech Republic) Lukáš Rosol
July 22	Tampere Open; Tampere, Finland; Challenger 80 – clay – 48S/4Q/16D; Singles – Doubles	(Sweden) Mikael Ymer; 6–3, 5–7, 6–3	(Netherlands) Tallon Griekspoor	(Portugal) Pedro Sousa (Slovenia) Blaž Rola	(Argentina) Federico Coria (Belgium) Kimmer Coppejans (Serbia) Peđa Krstin (Sweden) Elias Ymer
July 22	Tampere Open; Tampere, Finland; Challenger 80 – clay – 48S/4Q/16D; Singles – Doubles	(Netherlands) Sander Arends (Netherlands) David Pel; 6–0, 6–2	(Russia) Ivan Nedelko (Russia) Alexander Zhurbin	(Portugal) Pedro Sousa (Slovenia) Blaž Rola	(Argentina) Federico Coria (Belgium) Kimmer Coppejans (Serbia) Peđa Krstin (Sweden) Elias Ymer
July 29	Chengdu Challenger; Chengdu, China; Challenger 110 – hard – 48S/4Q/16D; Singles – Doubles	(South Korea) Chung Hyeon; 6–4, 6–3	(Japan) Yūichi Sugita	(China) Bai Yan (Japan) Tatsuma Ito	(Australia) James Duckworth (China) Zhang Zhizhen (Japan) Shuichi Sekiguchi (South Korea) Nam Ji-sung
July 29	Chengdu Challenger; Chengdu, China; Challenger 110 – hard – 48S/4Q/16D; Singles – Doubles	(India) Arjun Kadhe (India) Saketh Myneni; 6–3, 0–6, [10–6]	(South Korea) Nam Ji-sung (South Korea) Song Min-kyu	(China) Bai Yan (Japan) Tatsuma Ito	(Australia) James Duckworth (China) Zhang Zhizhen (Japan) Shuichi Sekiguchi (South Korea) Nam Ji-sung
July 29	BNP Paribas Sopot Open; Sopot, Poland; Challenger 100 – clay – 48S/4Q/16D; Singles – Doubles	(Italy) Stefano Travaglia; 6–4, 2–6, 6–2	(Slovakia) Filip Horanský	(France) Tristan Lamasine (Russia) Aslan Karatsev	(Egypt) Mohamed Safwat (Russia) Alexey Vatutin (Italy) Paolo Lorenzi (United Kingdom) Jan Choinski
July 29	BNP Paribas Sopot Open; Sopot, Poland; Challenger 100 – clay – 48S/4Q/16D; Singles – Doubles	(Germany) Andre Begemann (Romania) Florin Mergea; 6–1, 3–6, [10–8]	(Poland) Karol Drzewiecki (Poland) Mateusz Kowalczyk	(France) Tristan Lamasine (Russia) Aslan Karatsev	(Egypt) Mohamed Safwat (Russia) Alexey Vatutin (Italy) Paolo Lorenzi (United Kingdom) Jan Choinski
July 29	Open Castilla y León; Segovia, Spain; Challenger 90 – hard – 48S/4Q/16D; Singles – Doubles	(Spain) Nicola Kuhn; 6–2, 7–6^{(7–4)}	(Russia) Pavel Kotov	(France) Hugo Grenier (Sweden) Markus Eriksson	(Slovenia) Blaž Rola (France) Constant Lestienne (Turkey) Altuğ Çelikbilek (France) Antoine Escoffier
July 29	Open Castilla y León; Segovia, Spain; Challenger 90 – hard – 48S/4Q/16D; Singles – Doubles	(Netherlands) Sander Arends (Netherlands) David Pel; 6–4, 7–6^{(7–3)}	(Brazil) Orlando Luz (Brazil) Felipe Meligeni Alves	(France) Hugo Grenier (Sweden) Markus Eriksson	(Slovenia) Blaž Rola (France) Constant Lestienne (Turkey) Altuğ Çelikbilek (France) Antoine Escoffier
July 29	Kentucky Bank Tennis Championships; Lexington, United States; Challenger 80 – hard – 48S/4Q/16D; Singles – Doubles	(Italy) Jannik Sinner; 6–4, 3–6, 6–4	(Australia) Alex Bolt	(United States) JC Aragone (United Kingdom) Lloyd Glasspool	(Australia) Akira Santillan (South Korea) Lee Duck-hee (United Kingdom) Liam Broady (United States) Alexander Ritschard
July 29	Kentucky Bank Tennis Championships; Lexington, United States; Challenger 80 – hard – 48S/4Q/16D; Singles – Doubles	(Ecuador) Diego Hidalgo (United States) Martin Redlicki; 6–2, 6–2	(Venezuela) Roberto Maytín (United States) Jackson Withrow	(United States) JC Aragone (United Kingdom) Lloyd Glasspool	(Australia) Akira Santillan (South Korea) Lee Duck-hee (United Kingdom) Liam Broady (United States) Alexander Ritschard
July 29	Svijany Open; Liberec, Czech Republic; Challenger 80 – clay – 48S/4Q/16D; Singles – Doubles	(Serbia) Nikola Milojević; 6–3, 3–6, 6–4	(Brazil) Rogério Dutra Silva	(Czech Republic) Tomáš Macháč (Czech Republic) Pavel Nejedlý	(Slovakia) Alex Molčan (Croatia) Nino Serdarušić (Czech Republic) Jiří Veselý (Portugal) João Domingues
July 29	Svijany Open; Liberec, Czech Republic; Challenger 80 – clay – 48S/4Q/16D; Singles – Doubles	(Czech Republic) Jonáš Forejtek (Czech Republic) Michael Vrbenský; 6–4, 6–3	(Serbia) Nikola Ćaćić (Croatia) Antonio Šančić	(Czech Republic) Tomáš Macháč (Czech Republic) Pavel Nejedlý	(Slovakia) Alex Molčan (Croatia) Nino Serdarušić (Czech Republic) Jiří Veselý (Portugal) João Domingues

=== August ===
Week of	Tournament	Champions	Runners-up	Semifinalists	Quarterfinalists
August 5	Nordic Naturals Challenger; Aptos, United States; Challenger 90 – hard – 48S/4Q/16D; Singles – Doubles	(United States) Steve Johnson; 6–4, 7–6^{(7–4)}	(Germany) Dominik Koepfer	(United States) Ernesto Escobedo (Belarus) Egor Gerasimov	(Bosnia and Herzegovina) Damir Džumhur (United States) Marcos Giron (Japan) Taro Daniel (Japan) Go Soeda
August 5	Nordic Naturals Challenger; Aptos, United States; Challenger 90 – hard – 48S/4Q/16D; Singles – Doubles	(El Salvador) Marcelo Arévalo (Mexico) Miguel Ángel Reyes-Varela; 5–7, 6–3, [10–8]	(United States) Nathan Pasha (United States) Max Schnur	(United States) Ernesto Escobedo (Belarus) Egor Gerasimov	(Bosnia and Herzegovina) Damir Džumhur (United States) Marcos Giron (Japan) Taro Daniel (Japan) Go Soeda
August 5	Schwaben Open; Augsburg, Germany; Challenger 80 – clay – 48S/4Q/16D; Singles – Doubles	(Germany) Yannick Hanfmann; 2–6, 6–4, 7–5	(Finland) Emil Ruusuvuori	(Germany) Julian Lenz (Argentina) Facundo Mena	(Spain) Pedro Martínez (Spain) Guillermo García López (Germany) Daniel Altmaier (Belgium) Jeroen Vanneste
August 5	Schwaben Open; Augsburg, Germany; Challenger 80 – clay – 48S/4Q/16D; Singles – Doubles	(Belarus) Andrei Vasilevski (Slovakia) Igor Zelenay; 4–6, 6–4, [10–3]	(Croatia) Ivan Sabanov (Croatia) Matej Sabanov	(Germany) Julian Lenz (Argentina) Facundo Mena	(Spain) Pedro Martínez (Spain) Guillermo García López (Germany) Daniel Altmaier (Belgium) Jeroen Vanneste
August 5	Internazionali di Tennis di Manerbio – Trofeo Dimmidisì; Manerbio, Italy; Challenger 80 – clay – 48S/4Q/16D; Singles – Doubles	(Italy) Federico Gaio; 6–3, 6–1	(Italy) Paolo Lorenzi	(Russia) Teymuraz Gabashvili (Argentina) Federico Coria	(France) Sadio Doumbia (Italy) Andrea Arnaboldi (Hungary) Zsombor Piros (Italy) Lorenzo Giustino
August 5	Internazionali di Tennis di Manerbio – Trofeo Dimmidisì; Manerbio, Italy; Challenger 80 – clay – 48S/4Q/16D; Singles – Doubles	(Brazil) Fabrício Neis (Brazil) Fernando Romboli; 6–4, 7–6^{(7–4)}	(France) Sadio Doumbia (France) Fabien Reboul	(Russia) Teymuraz Gabashvili (Argentina) Federico Coria	(France) Sadio Doumbia (Italy) Andrea Arnaboldi (Hungary) Zsombor Piros (Italy) Lorenzo Giustino
August 5	Yokkaichi Challenger; Yokkaichi, Japan; Challenger 80 – hard – 48S/4Q/16D; Singles – Doubles	(Japan) Yūichi Sugita; 3–6, 6–3, 7–6^{(7–1)}	(Australia) James Duckworth	(Japan) Sho Shimabukuro (Japan) Tatsuma Ito	(South Korea) Nam Ji-sung (South Korea) Chung Hyeon (India) Saketh Myneni (Chinese Taipei) Wu Tung-lin
August 5	Yokkaichi Challenger; Yokkaichi, Japan; Challenger 80 – hard – 48S/4Q/16D; Singles – Doubles	(South Korea) Nam Ji-sung (South Korea) Song Min-kyu; 6–3, 3–6, [14–12]	(China) Gong Maoxin (China) Zhang Ze	(Japan) Sho Shimabukuro (Japan) Tatsuma Ito	(South Korea) Nam Ji-sung (South Korea) Chung Hyeon (India) Saketh Myneni (Chinese Taipei) Wu Tung-lin
August 12	Odlum Brown Vancouver Open; Vancouver, Canada; Challenger 100 – hard – 48S/4Q/16D; Singles – Doubles	(Lithuania) Ričardas Berankis; 6–3, 5–7, 6–4	(Chinese Taipei) Jason Jung	(Japan) Go Soeda (France) Maxime Janvier	(Australia) Thanasi Kokkinakis (France) Enzo Couacaud (United Kingdom) Liam Broady (Australia) Marc Polmans
August 12	Odlum Brown Vancouver Open; Vancouver, Canada; Challenger 100 – hard – 48S/4Q/16D; Singles – Doubles	(Sweden) Robert Lindstedt (United Kingdom) Jonny O'Mara; 6–2, 7–5	(Philippines) Treat Huey (Canada) Adil Shamasdin	(Japan) Go Soeda (France) Maxime Janvier	(Australia) Thanasi Kokkinakis (France) Enzo Couacaud (United Kingdom) Liam Broady (Australia) Marc Polmans
August 12	Internazionali di Tennis del Friuli Venezia Giulia; Cordenons, Italy; Challenger 90 – clay – 48S/4Q/16D; Singles – Doubles	(Australia) Christopher O'Connell; 7–5, 6–2	(Germany) Jeremy Jahn	(Sweden) Markus Eriksson (Hungary) Zsombor Piros	(Argentina) Andrea Collarini (Italy) Gian Marco Moroni (Argentina) Francisco Cerúndolo (Brazil) Thiago Seyboth Wild
August 12	Internazionali di Tennis del Friuli Venezia Giulia; Cordenons, Italy; Challenger 90 – clay – 48S/4Q/16D; Singles – Doubles	(Bosnia and Herzegovina) Tomislav Brkić (Croatia) Ante Pavić; 6–2, 6–3	(Serbia) Nikola Ćaćić (Croatia) Antonio Šančić	(Sweden) Markus Eriksson (Hungary) Zsombor Piros	(Argentina) Andrea Collarini (Italy) Gian Marco Moroni (Argentina) Francisco Cerúndolo (Brazil) Thiago Seyboth Wild
August 12	Meerbusch Challenger; Meerbusch, Germany; Challenger 80 – clay – 48S/4Q/16D; Singles – Doubles	(Portugal) Pedro Sousa; 7–6^{(7–4)}, 4–6, 6–3	(Serbia) Peđa Krstin	(Spain) Carlos Taberner (United Kingdom) Jan Choinski	(Netherlands) Jelle Sels (France) Tak Khunn Wang (Spain) Roberto Ortega Olmedo (Germany) Louis Wessels
August 12	Meerbusch Challenger; Meerbusch, Germany; Challenger 80 – clay – 48S/4Q/16D; Singles – Doubles	(Germany) Andre Begemann (Romania) Florin Mergea; 7–6^{(7–1)}, 6–7^{(4–7)}, [10–3]	(India) Sriram Balaji (India) Vishnu Vardhan	(Spain) Carlos Taberner (United Kingdom) Jan Choinski	(Netherlands) Jelle Sels (France) Tak Khunn Wang (Spain) Roberto Ortega Olmedo (Germany) Louis Wessels
August 12	Tilia Slovenia Open; Portorož, Slovenia; Challenger 80 – hard – 48S/4Q/16D; Singles – Doubles	(Slovenia) Aljaž Bedene; 7–5, 6–3	(Norway) Viktor Durasovic	(Slovenia) Blaž Rola (France) Constant Lestienne	(Slovakia) Lukáš Klein (Russia) Roman Safiullin (Czech Republic) Zdeněk Kolář (Russia) Artem Dubrivnyy
August 12	Tilia Slovenia Open; Portorož, Slovenia; Challenger 80 – hard – 48S/4Q/16D; Singles – Doubles	(Russia) Teymuraz Gabashvili (Spain) Carlos Gómez-Herrera; 6–3, 6–2	(Austria) Lucas Miedler (Austria) Tristan-Samuel Weissborn	(Slovenia) Blaž Rola (France) Constant Lestienne	(Slovakia) Lukáš Klein (Russia) Roman Safiullin (Czech Republic) Zdeněk Kolář (Russia) Artem Dubrivnyy
August 19	Internazionali di Tennis Città dell'Aquila; L'Aquila, Italy; Challenger 80 – clay – 48S/4Q/16D; Singles – Doubles	(Argentina) Andrea Collarini; 6–3, 6–1	(Slovakia) Andrej Martin	(Kazakhstan) Dmitry Popko (Spain) Carlos Taberner	(Brazil) Guilherme Clezar (Germany) Johannes Härteis (Argentina) Francisco Cerúndolo (Australia) Aleksandar Vukic
August 19	Internazionali di Tennis Città dell'Aquila; L'Aquila, Italy; Challenger 80 – clay – 48S/4Q/16D; Singles – Doubles	(Bosnia and Herzegovina) Tomislav Brkić (Croatia) Ante Pavić; 6–3, 6–2	(Switzerland) Luca Margaroli (Italy) Andrea Vavassori	(Kazakhstan) Dmitry Popko (Spain) Carlos Taberner	(Brazil) Guilherme Clezar (Germany) Johannes Härteis (Argentina) Francisco Cerúndolo (Australia) Aleksandar Vukic
August 26	International Challenger Baotou; Baotou, China; Challenger 80 – clay (i) – 48S/4Q/16D; Singles – Doubles	(Australia) James Duckworth; 6–4, 6–3	(India) Sasikumar Mukund	(Portugal) Frederico Ferreira Silva (Chinese Taipei) Wu Tung-lin	(Portugal) Gonçalo Oliveira (Serbia) Peđa Krstin (China) Bai Yan (Australia) Harry Bourchier
August 26	International Challenger Baotou; Baotou, China; Challenger 80 – clay (i) – 48S/4Q/16D; Singles – Doubles	(South Korea) Nam Ji-sung (South Korea) Song Min-kyu; 7–6^{(7–3)}, 6–2	(Russia) Teymuraz Gabashvili (India) Sasikumar Mukund	(Portugal) Frederico Ferreira Silva (Chinese Taipei) Wu Tung-lin	(Portugal) Gonçalo Oliveira (Serbia) Peđa Krstin (China) Bai Yan (Australia) Harry Bourchier
August 26	Città di Como Challenger; Como, Italy; Challenger 80 – clay – 48S/4Q/16D; Singles – Doubles	(Argentina) Facundo Mena; 2–6, 6–4, 6–1	(Slovakia) Andrej Martin	(Italy) Stefano Travaglia (Italy) Alessandro Giannessi	(Netherlands) Jelle Sels (Germany) Daniel Altmaier (Portugal) Pedro Sousa (Kazakhstan) Dmitry Popko
August 26	Città di Como Challenger; Como, Italy; Challenger 80 – clay – 48S/4Q/16D; Singles – Doubles	(Germany) Andre Begemann (Romania) Florin Mergea; 5–7, 7–5, [14–12]	(Brazil) Fabrício Neis (Portugal) Pedro Sousa	(Italy) Stefano Travaglia (Italy) Alessandro Giannessi	(Netherlands) Jelle Sels (Germany) Daniel Altmaier (Portugal) Pedro Sousa (Kazakhstan) Dmitry Popko
August 26	Rafa Nadal Open Banc Sabadell; Mallorca, Spain; Challenger 80 – hard – 48S/4Q/16D; Singles – Doubles	(Finland) Emil Ruusuvuori; 6–0, 6–1	(Italy) Matteo Viola	(Spain) Alejandro Davidovich Fokina (Germany) Daniel Masur	(Austria) Jurij Rodionov (Spain) Pedro Martínez (Slovenia) Blaž Kavčič (Ukraine) Illya Marchenko
August 26	Rafa Nadal Open Banc Sabadell; Mallorca, Spain; Challenger 80 – hard – 48S/4Q/16D; Singles – Doubles	(Netherlands) Sander Arends (Netherlands) David Pel; 7–5, 6–4	(Poland) Karol Drzewiecki (Poland) Szymon Walków	(Spain) Alejandro Davidovich Fokina (Germany) Daniel Masur	(Austria) Jurij Rodionov (Spain) Pedro Martínez (Slovenia) Blaž Kavčič (Ukraine) Illya Marchenko

=== September ===
Week of	Tournament	Champions	Runners-up	Semifinalists	Quarterfinalists
September 2	Oracle Challenger Series – New Haven; New Haven, United States; Challenger 125 – hard – 48S/4Q/16D; Singles – Doubles	(United States) Tommy Paul; 6–3, 6–3	(United States) Marcos Giron	(United States) Noah Rubin (Bosnia and Herzegovina) Damir Džumhur	(Italy) Andreas Seppi (United States) Bradley Klahn (United States) Michael Mmoh (Canada) Brayden Schnur
September 2	Oracle Challenger Series – New Haven; New Haven, United States; Challenger 125 – hard – 48S/4Q/16D; Singles – Doubles	(United States) Robert Galloway (United States) Nathaniel Lammons; 7–5, 6–4	(Belgium) Sander Gillé (Belgium) Joran Vliegen	(United States) Noah Rubin (Bosnia and Herzegovina) Damir Džumhur	(Italy) Andreas Seppi (United States) Bradley Klahn (United States) Michael Mmoh (Canada) Brayden Schnur
September 2	Jinan International Open; Jinan, China; Challenger 125 – hard – 48S/4Q/16D; Singles – Doubles	(China) Zhang Zhizhen; 7–5, 2–6, 6–4	(Japan) Go Soeda	(Spain) Enrique López Pérez (South Korea) Kwon Soon-woo	(India) Prajnesh Gunneswaran (China) Li Zhe (Australia) Max Purcell (Russia) Teymuraz Gabashvili
September 2	Jinan International Open; Jinan, China; Challenger 125 – hard – 48S/4Q/16D; Singles – Doubles	(Australia) Matthew Ebden (India) Divij Sharan; 7–6^{(7–4)}, 5–7, [10–3]	(South Korea) Nam Ji-sung (South Korea) Song Min-kyu	(Spain) Enrique López Pérez (South Korea) Kwon Soon-woo	(India) Prajnesh Gunneswaran (China) Li Zhe (Australia) Max Purcell (Russia) Teymuraz Gabashvili
September 2	AON Open Challenger; Genoa, Italy; Challenger 125 – clay – 48S/4Q/16D; Singles – Doubles	(Italy) Lorenzo Sonego; 6–2, 4–6, 7–6^{(8–6)}	(Spain) Alejandro Davidovich Fokina	(Argentina) Guido Andreozzi (Spain) Albert Ramos Viñolas	(Italy) Stefano Travaglia (Germany) Philipp Kohlschreiber (Japan) Taro Daniel (Brazil) Thiago Monteiro
September 2	AON Open Challenger; Genoa, Italy; Challenger 125 – clay – 48S/4Q/16D; Singles – Doubles	(Uruguay) Ariel Behar (Ecuador) Gonzalo Escobar; 3–6, 6–4, [10–3]	(Argentina) Guido Andreozzi (Argentina) Andrés Molteni	(Argentina) Guido Andreozzi (Spain) Albert Ramos Viñolas	(Italy) Stefano Travaglia (Germany) Philipp Kohlschreiber (Japan) Taro Daniel (Brazil) Thiago Monteiro
September 2	Cassis Open Provence; Cassis, France; Challenger 80 – hard – 48S/4Q/16D; Singles – Doubles	(France) Jo-Wilfried Tsonga; 6–1, 6–0	(Israel) Dudi Sela	(Sweden) Mikael Ymer (Czech Republic) Lukáš Rosol	(France) Rayane Roumane (Kazakhstan) Dmitry Popko (Finland) Emil Ruusuvuori (Kazakhstan) Aleksandr Nedovyesov
September 2	Cassis Open Provence; Cassis, France; Challenger 80 – hard – 48S/4Q/16D; Singles – Doubles	(Sweden) André Göransson (Netherlands) Sem Verbeek; 7–6^{(8–6)}, 4–6, [11–9]	(Netherlands) Sander Arends (Netherlands) David Pel	(Sweden) Mikael Ymer (Czech Republic) Lukáš Rosol	(France) Rayane Roumane (Kazakhstan) Dmitry Popko (Finland) Emil Ruusuvuori (Kazakhstan) Aleksandr Nedovyesov
September 9	Pekao Szczecin Open; Szczecin, Poland; Challenger 125 – clay – 48S/4Q/16D; Singles – Doubles	(Slovakia) Jozef Kovalík; 6–7^{(5–7)}, 6–2, 6–4	(Argentina) Guido Andreozzi	(Spain) Albert Ramos Viñolas (Italy) Marco Cecchinato	(Germany) Jeremy Jahn (Spain) Roberto Carballés Baena (France) Constant Lestienne (Japan) Taro Daniel
September 9	Pekao Szczecin Open; Szczecin, Poland; Challenger 125 – clay – 48S/4Q/16D; Singles – Doubles	(Argentina) Guido Andreozzi (Argentina) Andrés Molteni; 6–4, 6–3	(Netherlands) Matwé Middelkoop (Chile) Hans Podlipnik Castillo	(Spain) Albert Ramos Viñolas (Italy) Marco Cecchinato	(Germany) Jeremy Jahn (Spain) Roberto Carballés Baena (France) Constant Lestienne (Japan) Taro Daniel
September 9	Amex-Istanbul Challenger; Istanbul, Turkey; Challenger 90 – hard – 48S/4Q/16D; Singles – Doubles	(France) Ugo Humbert; 6–2, 6–2	(Uzbekistan) Denis Istomin	(Slovenia) Blaž Kavčič (Netherlands) Botic van de Zandschulp	(Belgium) Ruben Bemelmans (Spain) Nicola Kuhn (Czech Republic) David Poljak (Kazakhstan) Aleksandr Nedovyesov
September 9	Amex-Istanbul Challenger; Istanbul, Turkey; Challenger 90 – hard – 48S/4Q/16D; Singles – Doubles	(Kazakhstan) Andrey Golubev (Kazakhstan) Aleksandr Nedovyesov; Walkover	(Czech Republic) Marek Gengel (Czech Republic) Lukáš Rosol	(Slovenia) Blaž Kavčič (Netherlands) Botic van de Zandschulp	(Belgium) Ruben Bemelmans (Spain) Nicola Kuhn (Czech Republic) David Poljak (Kazakhstan) Aleksandr Nedovyesov
September 9	Copa Sevilla; Seville, Spain; Challenger 90 – clay – 48S/4Q/16D; Singles – Doubles	(Spain) Alejandro Davidovich Fokina; 2–6, 6–2, 6–2	(Spain) Jaume Munar	(Spain) Carlos Taberner (Italy) Salvatore Caruso	(Spain) Guillermo García López (Spain) Íñigo Cervantes (Belgium) Kimmer Coppejans (Spain) Carlos Alcaraz
September 9	Copa Sevilla; Seville, Spain; Challenger 90 – clay – 48S/4Q/16D; Singles – Doubles	(Spain) Gerard Granollers (Spain) Pedro Martínez; 7–5, 6–4	(Belgium) Kimmer Coppejans (Spain) Sergio Martos Gornés	(Spain) Carlos Taberner (Italy) Salvatore Caruso	(Spain) Guillermo García López (Spain) Íñigo Cervantes (Belgium) Kimmer Coppejans (Spain) Carlos Alcaraz
September 9	Shanghai Challenger; Shanghai, China; Challenger 90 – hard – 48S/4Q/16D; Singles – Doubles	(Japan) Yasutaka Uchiyama; 6–4, 7–6^{(7–4)}	(China) Wu Di	(India) Prajnesh Gunneswaran (Japan) Yūichi Sugita	(Japan) Hiroki Moriya (Australia) Andrew Harris (Spain) Enrique López Pérez (United States) Collin Altamirano
September 9	Shanghai Challenger; Shanghai, China; Challenger 90 – hard – 48S/4Q/16D; Singles – Doubles	(China) Gao Xin (China) Sun Fajing; 2–6, 6–4, [10–7]	(Australia) Marc Polmans (Australia) Scott Puodziunas	(India) Prajnesh Gunneswaran (Japan) Yūichi Sugita	(Japan) Hiroki Moriya (Australia) Andrew Harris (Spain) Enrique López Pérez (United States) Collin Altamirano
September 9	Banja Luka Challenger; Banja Luka, Bosnia and Herzegovina; Challenger 80 – clay – 48S/4Q/16D; Singles – Doubles	(Netherlands) Tallon Griekspoor; 6–2, 6–3	(India) Sumit Nagal	(Serbia) Peđa Krstin (Slovakia) Filip Horanský	(Argentina) Facundo Mena (Kazakhstan) Dmitry Popko (Argentina) Federico Coria (Chile) Alejandro Tabilo
September 9	Banja Luka Challenger; Banja Luka, Bosnia and Herzegovina; Challenger 80 – clay – 48S/4Q/16D; Singles – Doubles	(France) Sadio Doumbia (France) Fabien Reboul; 6–3, 7–6^{(7–4)}	(Peru) Sergio Galdós (Argentina) Facundo Mena	(Serbia) Peđa Krstin (Slovakia) Filip Horanský	(Argentina) Facundo Mena (Kazakhstan) Dmitry Popko (Argentina) Federico Coria (Chile) Alejandro Tabilo
September 9	Cary Challenger; Cary, United States; Challenger 80 – hard – 48S/4Q/16D; Singles – Doubles	(Italy) Andreas Seppi; 6–2, 6–7^{(4–7)}, 6–3	(United States) Michael Mmoh	(France) Enzo Couacaud (United States) JC Aragone	(United States) Noah Rubin (Canada) Filip Peliwo (United States) Ulises Blanch (United States) Tommy Paul
September 9	Cary Challenger; Cary, United States; Challenger 80 – hard – 48S/4Q/16D; Singles – Doubles	(United States) Sekou Bangoura (United States) Michael Mmoh; 4–6, 6–4, [10–8]	(Philippines) Treat Huey (Australia) John-Patrick Smith	(France) Enzo Couacaud (United States) JC Aragone	(United States) Noah Rubin (Canada) Filip Peliwo (United States) Ulises Blanch (United States) Tommy Paul
September 16	OEC Kaohsiung; Kaohsiung, Taiwan; Challenger 125 – carpet (i) – 48S/4Q/16D; Singles – Doubles	(Australia) John Millman; 6–4, 6–2	(Australia) Marc Polmans	(Portugal) Frederico Ferreira Silva (Canada) Steven Diez	(Australia) Alex Bolt (South Korea) Nam Ji-sung (Czech Republic) Jiří Veselý (Spain) Enrique López Pérez
September 16	OEC Kaohsiung; Kaohsiung, Taiwan; Challenger 125 – carpet (i) – 48S/4Q/16D; Singles – Doubles	(Chinese Taipei) Hsieh Cheng-peng (Chinese Taipei) Yang Tsung-hua; 6–4, 7–6^{(7–4)}	(United States) Evan King (United States) Hunter Reese	(Portugal) Frederico Ferreira Silva (Canada) Steven Diez	(Australia) Alex Bolt (South Korea) Nam Ji-sung (Czech Republic) Jiří Veselý (Spain) Enrique López Pérez
September 16	Columbus Challenger; Columbus, United States; Challenger 80 – hard (i) – 48S/4Q/16D; Singles – Doubles	(Canada) Peter Polansky; 6–3, 7–6^{(7–4)}	(United States) J. J. Wolf	(Ecuador) Emilio Gómez (Ecuador) Roberto Quiroz	(France) Enzo Couacaud (France) Gabriel Petit (United States) Thai-Son Kwiatkowski (Denmark) Mikael Torpegaard
September 16	Columbus Challenger; Columbus, United States; Challenger 80 – hard (i) – 48S/4Q/16D; Singles – Doubles	(United States) Martin Redlicki (United States) Jackson Withrow; 6–4, 7–6^{(7–4)}	(United States) Nathan Pasha (United States) Max Schnur	(Ecuador) Emilio Gómez (Ecuador) Roberto Quiroz	(France) Enzo Couacaud (France) Gabriel Petit (United States) Thai-Son Kwiatkowski (Denmark) Mikael Torpegaard
September 16	Thindown Challenger Biella; Biella, Italy; Challenger 80 – clay – 48S/4Q/16D; Singles – Doubles	(Italy) Gianluca Mager; 6–0, 6–7^{(4–7)}, 7–5	(Italy) Paolo Lorenzi	(Spain) Alejandro Davidovich Fokina (Spain) Jaume Munar	(Italy) Alessandro Giannessi (Argentina) Andrea Collarini (Spain) Tommy Robredo (Japan) Taro Daniel
September 16	Thindown Challenger Biella; Biella, Italy; Challenger 80 – clay – 48S/4Q/16D; Singles – Doubles	(Bosnia and Herzegovina) Tomislav Brkić (Croatia) Ante Pavić; 7–6^{(7–2)}, 6–4	(Uruguay) Ariel Behar (Kazakhstan) Andrey Golubev	(Spain) Alejandro Davidovich Fokina (Spain) Jaume Munar	(Italy) Alessandro Giannessi (Argentina) Andrea Collarini (Spain) Tommy Robredo (Japan) Taro Daniel
September 16	Sibiu Open; Sibiu, Romania; Challenger 80 – clay – 48S/4Q/16D; Singles – Doubles	(Serbia) Danilo Petrović; 6–4, 6–2	(Australia) Christopher O'Connell	(Netherlands) Jelle Sels (Slovakia) Alex Molčan	(Czech Republic) Vít Kopřiva (Czech Republic) Václav Šafránek (France) Laurent Lokoli (Slovenia) Blaž Rola
September 16	Sibiu Open; Sibiu, Romania; Challenger 80 – clay – 48S/4Q/16D; Singles – Doubles	(France) Sadio Doumbia (France) Fabien Reboul; 6–4, 3–6, [10–7]	(Croatia) Ivan Sabanov (Croatia) Matej Sabanov	(Netherlands) Jelle Sels (Slovakia) Alex Molčan	(Czech Republic) Vít Kopřiva (Czech Republic) Václav Šafránek (France) Laurent Lokoli (Slovenia) Blaž Rola
September 16	Murray Trophy – Glasgow; Glasgow, United Kingdom; Challenger 80 – hard (i) – 48S/4Q/16D; Singles – Doubles	(Finland) Emil Ruusuvuori; 6–3, 6–1	(France) Alexandre Müller	(India) Ramkumar Ramanathan (Austria) Jurij Rodionov	(Spain) Nicola Kuhn (Germany) Daniel Masur (Germany) Tobias Kamke (Italy) Roberto Marcora
September 16	Murray Trophy – Glasgow; Glasgow, United Kingdom; Challenger 80 – hard (i) – 48S/4Q/16D; Singles – Doubles	(Belgium) Ruben Bemelmans (Germany) Daniel Masur; 4–6, 6–3, [10–8]	(United Kingdom) Jamie Murray (Australia) John-Patrick Smith	(India) Ramkumar Ramanathan (Austria) Jurij Rodionov	(Spain) Nicola Kuhn (Germany) Daniel Masur (Germany) Tobias Kamke (Italy) Roberto Marcora
September 23	Open d'Orléans; Orléans, France; Challenger 125 – hard (i) – 48S/4Q/16D; Singles – Doubles	(Sweden) Mikael Ymer; 6–3, 7–5	(France) Grégoire Barrère	(France) Jo-Wilfried Tsonga (France) Tristan Lamasine	(France) Antoine Hoang (Slovenia) Aljaž Bedene (France) Maxime Janvier (Ukraine) Sergiy Stakhovsky
September 23	Open d'Orléans; Orléans, France; Challenger 125 – hard (i) – 48S/4Q/16D; Singles – Doubles	(Monaco) Romain Arneodo (Monaco) Hugo Nys; 6–7^{(5–7)}, 6–3, [10–1]	(Chile) Hans Podlipnik Castillo (Austria) Tristan-Samuel Weissborn	(France) Jo-Wilfried Tsonga (France) Tristan Lamasine	(France) Antoine Hoang (Slovenia) Aljaž Bedene (France) Maxime Janvier (Ukraine) Sergiy Stakhovsky
September 23	Tiburon Challenger; Tiburon, United States; Challenger 100 – hard – 48S/4Q/16D; Singles – Doubles	(United States) Tommy Paul; 7–5, 6–7^{(3–7)}, 6–4	(Australia) Thanasi Kokkinakis	(Ecuador) Emilio Gómez (United States) Thai-Son Kwiatkowski	(Ecuador) Gonzalo Escobar (United States) Sekou Bangoura (United States) Brandon Nakashima (United States) Maxime Cressy
September 23	Tiburon Challenger; Tiburon, United States; Challenger 100 – hard – 48S/4Q/16D; Singles – Doubles	(United States) Robert Galloway (Venezuela) Roberto Maytín; 6–2, 7–5	(United States) JC Aragone (Barbados) Darian King	(Ecuador) Emilio Gómez (United States) Thai-Son Kwiatkowski	(Ecuador) Gonzalo Escobar (United States) Sekou Bangoura (United States) Brandon Nakashima (United States) Maxime Cressy
September 23	Firenze Tennis Cup; Florence, Italy; Challenger 80 – clay – 48S/4Q/16D; Singles – Doubles	(Argentina) Marco Trungelliti; 6–2, 6–3	(Portugal) Pedro Sousa	(Germany) Philipp Kohlschreiber (Egypt) Mohamed Safwat	(Italy) Raúl Brancaccio (Belgium) Kimmer Coppejans (Netherlands) Robin Haase (Spain) Mario Vilella Martínez
September 23	Firenze Tennis Cup; Florence, Italy; Challenger 80 – clay – 48S/4Q/16D; Singles – Doubles	(Switzerland) Luca Margaroli (Canada) Adil Shamasdin; 7–5, 6–7^{(6–8)}, [14–12]	(Spain) Gerard Granollers (Spain) Pedro Martínez	(Germany) Philipp Kohlschreiber (Egypt) Mohamed Safwat	(Italy) Raúl Brancaccio (Belgium) Kimmer Coppejans (Netherlands) Robin Haase (Spain) Mario Vilella Martínez
September 23	Challenger de Buenos Aires; Buenos Aires, Argentina; Challenger 80 – clay – 48S/4Q/16D; Singles – Doubles	(India) Sumit Nagal; 6–4, 6–2	(Argentina) Facundo Bagnis	(Argentina) Leonardo Mayer (Brazil) Thiago Monteiro	(Argentina) Agustín Velotti (Argentina) Juan Pablo Ficovich (Argentina) Andrea Collarini (Argentina) Francisco Cerúndolo
September 23	Challenger de Buenos Aires; Buenos Aires, Argentina; Challenger 80 – clay – 48S/4Q/16D; Singles – Doubles	(Argentina) Guido Andreozzi (Argentina) Andrés Molteni; 6–7^{(3–7)}, 6–2, [10–1]	(Bolivia) Hugo Dellien (Bolivia) Federico Zeballos	(Argentina) Leonardo Mayer (Brazil) Thiago Monteiro	(Argentina) Agustín Velotti (Argentina) Juan Pablo Ficovich (Argentina) Andrea Collarini (Argentina) Francisco Cerúndolo
September 30	Nur-Sultan Challenger; Nur-Sultan, Kazakhstan; Challenger 80 – hard (i) – 48S/4Q/16D; Singles – Doubles	(Ukraine) Illya Marchenko; 4–6, 6–4, 6–3	(Germany) Yannick Maden	(Czech Republic) Tomáš Macháč (Belgium) Ruben Bemelmans	(France) Corentin Moutet (Russia) Alexey Vatutin (Russia) Konstantin Kravchuk (Russia) Evgeny Donskoy
September 30	Nur-Sultan Challenger; Nur-Sultan, Kazakhstan; Challenger 80 – hard (i) – 48S/4Q/16D; Singles – Doubles	(Finland) Harri Heliövaara (Ukraine) Illya Marchenko; 6–4, 6–4	(Poland) Karol Drzewiecki (Poland) Szymon Walków	(Czech Republic) Tomáš Macháč (Belgium) Ruben Bemelmans	(France) Corentin Moutet (Russia) Alexey Vatutin (Russia) Konstantin Kravchuk (Russia) Evgeny Donskoy
September 30	Campeonato Internacional de Tênis de Campinas; Campinas, Brazil; Challenger 80 – clay – 48S/4Q/16D; Singles – Doubles	(Peru) Juan Pablo Varillas; 2–6, 7–6^{(7–4)}, 6–2	(Argentina) Juan Pablo Ficovich	(India) Sumit Nagal (Argentina) Federico Coria	(Argentina) Francisco Cerúndolo (Peru) Nicolás Álvarez (Ecuador) Diego Hidalgo (Brazil) Thomaz Bellucci
September 30	Campeonato Internacional de Tênis de Campinas; Campinas, Brazil; Challenger 80 – clay – 48S/4Q/16D; Singles – Doubles	(Brazil) Orlando Luz (Brazil) Rafael Matos; 6–7^{(2–7)}, 6–4, [10–8]	(Mexico) Miguel Ángel Reyes-Varela (Brazil) Fernando Romboli	(India) Sumit Nagal (Argentina) Federico Coria	(Argentina) Francisco Cerúndolo (Peru) Nicolás Álvarez (Ecuador) Diego Hidalgo (Brazil) Thomaz Bellucci
September 30	Sánchez-Casal Cup; Barcelona, Spain; Challenger 80 – clay – 48S/4Q/16D; Singles – Doubles	(Italy) Salvatore Caruso; 6–4, 6–2	(Slovakia) Jozef Kovalík	(Italy) Alessandro Giannessi (Spain) Jaume Munar	(Spain) Carlos Taberner (Italy) Filippo Baldi (Portugal) Pedro Sousa (Egypt) Mohamed Safwat
September 30	Sánchez-Casal Cup; Barcelona, Spain; Challenger 80 – clay – 48S/4Q/16D; Singles – Doubles	(Italy) Simone Bolelli (Spain) David Vega Hernández; 6–4, 7–5	(Spain) Sergio Martos Gornés (India) Ramkumar Ramanathan	(Italy) Alessandro Giannessi (Spain) Jaume Munar	(Spain) Carlos Taberner (Italy) Filippo Baldi (Portugal) Pedro Sousa (Egypt) Mohamed Safwat

=== October ===
Week of	Tournament	Champions	Runners-up	Semifinalists	Quarterfinalists
October 7	Milex Open; Santo Domingo, Dominican Republic; Challenger 125 – clay – 48S/4Q/16D; Singles – Doubles	(Peru) Juan Pablo Varillas; 6–3, 2–6, 6–2	(Argentina) Federico Coria	(Brazil) Thiago Monteiro (Bolivia) Hugo Dellien	(Argentina) Facundo Bagnis (Chile) Alejandro Tabilo (Brazil) Guilherme Clezar (Italy) Alessandro Giannessi
October 7	Milex Open; Santo Domingo, Dominican Republic; Challenger 125 – clay – 48S/4Q/16D; Singles – Doubles	(Uruguay) Ariel Behar (Ecuador) Gonzalo Escobar; 6–7^{(5–7)}, 6–4, [12–10]	(Brazil) Orlando Luz (Venezuela) Luis David Martínez	(Brazil) Thiago Monteiro (Bolivia) Hugo Dellien	(Argentina) Facundo Bagnis (Chile) Alejandro Tabilo (Brazil) Guilherme Clezar (Italy) Alessandro Giannessi
October 7	Internationaux de Tennis de Vendée; Mouilleron-le-Captif, France; Challenger 100 – hard (i) – 48S/4Q/16D; Singles – Doubles	(Sweden) Mikael Ymer; 6–1, 6–4	(France) Mathias Bourgue	(Czech Republic) Jiří Veselý (Italy) Jannik Sinner	(Switzerland) Henri Laaksonen (France) Antoine Hoang (Austria) Dennis Novak (Romania) Marius Copil
October 7	Internationaux de Tennis de Vendée; Mouilleron-le-Captif, France; Challenger 100 – hard (i) – 48S/4Q/16D; Singles – Doubles	(United Kingdom) Jonny O'Mara (United Kingdom) Ken Skupski; 6–1, 6–4	(Netherlands) Sander Arends (Netherlands) David Pel	(Czech Republic) Jiří Veselý (Italy) Jannik Sinner	(Switzerland) Henri Laaksonen (France) Antoine Hoang (Austria) Dennis Novak (Romania) Marius Copil
October 7	Fairfield Challenger; Fairfield, United States; Challenger 100 – hard – 48S/4Q/16D; Singles – Doubles	(Australia) Christopher O'Connell; 6–4, 6–4	(United States) Steve Johnson	(United States) Brandon Nakashima (United States) Kevin King	(Barbados) Darian King (Japan) Taro Daniel (United Kingdom) Jack Draper (Canada) Peter Polansky
October 7	Fairfield Challenger; Fairfield, United States; Challenger 100 – hard – 48S/4Q/16D; Singles – Doubles	(Barbados) Darian King (Canada) Peter Polansky; 6–4, 3–6, [12–10]	(Sweden) André Göransson (Netherlands) Sem Verbeek	(United States) Brandon Nakashima (United States) Kevin King	(Barbados) Darian King (Japan) Taro Daniel (United Kingdom) Jack Draper (Canada) Peter Polansky
October 14	Ningbo Challenger; Ningbo, China; Challenger 125 – hard – 48S/4Q/16D; Singles – Doubles	(Japan) Yasutaka Uchiyama; 6–1, 6–3	(Canada) Steven Diez	(Spain) Alejandro Davidovich Fokina (United States) Bradley Klahn	(India) Prajnesh Gunneswaran (Croatia) Borna Gojo (Portugal) Frederico Ferreira Silva (Japan) Hiroki Moriya
October 14	Ningbo Challenger; Ningbo, China; Challenger 125 – hard – 48S/4Q/16D; Singles – Doubles	(Australia) Andrew Harris (Australia) Marc Polmans; 6–0, 6–1	(Australia) Alex Bolt (Australia) Matt Reid	(Spain) Alejandro Davidovich Fokina (United States) Bradley Klahn	(India) Prajnesh Gunneswaran (Croatia) Borna Gojo (Portugal) Frederico Ferreira Silva (Japan) Hiroki Moriya
October 14	Wolffkran Open; Ismaning, Germany; Challenger 90 – carpet (i) – 48S/4Q/16D; Singles – Doubles	(Slovakia) Lukáš Lacko; 6–3, 6–0	(United States) Maxime Cressy	(Czech Republic) Jiří Veselý (Germany) Julian Lenz	(Spain) Adrián Menéndez Maceiras (Germany) Daniel Masur (Russia) Teymuraz Gabashvili (Germany) Johannes Härteis
October 14	Wolffkran Open; Ismaning, Germany; Challenger 90 – carpet (i) – 48S/4Q/16D; Singles – Doubles	(France) Quentin Halys (France) Tristan Lamasine; 6–3, 7–5	(United States) James Cerretani (United States) Maxime Cressy	(Czech Republic) Jiří Veselý (Germany) Julian Lenz	(Spain) Adrián Menéndez Maceiras (Germany) Daniel Masur (Russia) Teymuraz Gabashvili (Germany) Johannes Härteis
October 14	Las Vegas Challenger; Las Vegas, United States; Challenger 80 – hard – 48S/4Q/16D; Singles – Doubles	(Canada) Vasek Pospisil; 7–5, 6–7^{(11–13)}, 6–3	(Australia) James Duckworth	(United States) Ernesto Escobedo (Australia) Christopher O'Connell	(United States) Steve Johnson (United States) Stefan Kozlov (United States) Marcos Giron (Japan) Taro Daniel
October 14	Las Vegas Challenger; Las Vegas, United States; Challenger 80 – hard – 48S/4Q/16D; Singles – Doubles	(Philippines) Ruben Gonzales (South Africa) Ruan Roelofse; 2–6, 6–3, [10–8]	(United States) Nathan Pasha (United States) Max Schnur	(United States) Ernesto Escobedo (Australia) Christopher O'Connell	(United States) Steve Johnson (United States) Stefan Kozlov (United States) Marcos Giron (Japan) Taro Daniel
October 21	Brest Challenger; Brest, France; Challenger 100 – hard (i) – 48S/4Q/16D; Singles – Doubles	(France) Ugo Humbert; 6–2, 6–3	(Russia) Evgeny Donskoy	(Slovakia) Norbert Gombos (South Africa) Lloyd Harris	(France) Antoine Hoang (Ukraine) Illya Marchenko (France) Corentin Denolly (Spain) Roberto Carballés Baena
October 21	Brest Challenger; Brest, France; Challenger 100 – hard (i) – 48S/4Q/16D; Singles – Doubles	(Ukraine) Denys Molchanov (Belarus) Andrei Vasilevski; 6–3, 6–1	(Italy) Andrea Vavassori (Spain) David Vega Hernández	(Slovakia) Norbert Gombos (South Africa) Lloyd Harris	(France) Antoine Hoang (Ukraine) Illya Marchenko (France) Corentin Denolly (Spain) Roberto Carballés Baena
October 21	Latrobe City Traralgon ATP Challenger; Traralgon, Australia; Challenger 80 – hard – 48S/4Q/16D; Singles – Doubles	(Australia) Marc Polmans; 7–5, 6–3	(Australia) Andrew Harris	(Japan) Hiroki Moriya (Japan) Tatsuma Ito	(Japan) Yasutaka Uchiyama (Chile) Alejandro Tabilo (Australia) James Duckworth (Australia) Max Purcell
October 21	Latrobe City Traralgon ATP Challenger; Traralgon, Australia; Challenger 80 – hard – 48S/4Q/16D; Singles – Doubles	(Australia) Max Purcell (Australia) Luke Saville; 6–7^{(2–7)}, 6–3, [10–4]	(United Kingdom) Brydan Klein (Australia) Scott Puodziunas	(Japan) Hiroki Moriya (Japan) Tatsuma Ito	(Japan) Yasutaka Uchiyama (Chile) Alejandro Tabilo (Australia) James Duckworth (Australia) Max Purcell
October 21	Tennis Challenger Hamburg; Hamburg, Germany; Challenger 80 – hard (i) – 48S/4Q/16D; Singles – Doubles	(Netherlands) Botic van de Zandschulp; 6–3, 5–7, 6–1	(Spain) Bernabé Zapata Miralles	(Italy) Salvatore Caruso (Sweden) Elias Ymer	(Italy) Federico Gaio (Germany) Cedrik-Marcel Stebe (Turkey) Altuğ Çelikbilek (Germany) Daniel Altmaier
October 21	Tennis Challenger Hamburg; Hamburg, Germany; Challenger 80 – hard (i) – 48S/4Q/16D; Singles – Doubles	(United States) James Cerretani (United States) Maxime Cressy; 6–4, 6–4	(United Kingdom) Ken Skupski (Australia) John-Patrick Smith	(Italy) Salvatore Caruso (Sweden) Elias Ymer	(Italy) Federico Gaio (Germany) Cedrik-Marcel Stebe (Turkey) Altuğ Çelikbilek (Germany) Daniel Altmaier
October 21	Lima Challenger; Lima, Peru; Challenger 80 – clay – 48S/4Q/16D; Singles – Doubles	(Brazil) Thiago Monteiro; 6–2, 6–7^{(7–9)}, 6–4	(Argentina) Federico Coria	(Peru) Juan Pablo Varillas (Argentina) Facundo Bagnis	(Brazil) Thiago Seyboth Wild (Argentina) Juan Pablo Ficovich (Colombia) Daniel Elahi Galán (Brazil) João Menezes
October 21	Lima Challenger; Lima, Peru; Challenger 80 – clay – 48S/4Q/16D; Singles – Doubles	(Uruguay) Ariel Behar (Ecuador) Gonzalo Escobar; 6–2, 2–6, [10–3]	(Venezuela) Luis David Martínez (Brazil) Felipe Meligeni Alves	(Peru) Juan Pablo Varillas (Argentina) Facundo Bagnis	(Brazil) Thiago Seyboth Wild (Argentina) Juan Pablo Ficovich (Colombia) Daniel Elahi Galán (Brazil) João Menezes
October 21	Liuzhou Open; Liuzhou, China; Challenger 80 – hard – 48S/4Q/16D; Singles – Doubles	(Spain) Alejandro Davidovich Fokina; 6–3, 5–7, 7–6^{(7–5)}	(Uzbekistan) Denis Istomin	(Serbia) Danilo Petrović (Croatia) Borna Gojo	(Chinese Taipei) Wu Tung-lin (China) Li Zhe (Chinese Taipei) Jason Jung (Japan) Yuta Shimizu
October 21	Liuzhou Open; Liuzhou, China; Challenger 80 – hard – 48S/4Q/16D; Singles – Doubles	(Russia) Mikhail Elgin (Uzbekistan) Denis Istomin; 3–6, 6–4, [10–6]	(South Korea) Nam Ji-sung (South Korea) Song Min-kyu	(Serbia) Danilo Petrović (Croatia) Borna Gojo	(Chinese Taipei) Wu Tung-lin (China) Li Zhe (Chinese Taipei) Jason Jung (Japan) Yuta Shimizu
October 28	Shenzhen Longhua Open; Shenzhen, China; Challenger 110 – hard – 48S/4Q/16D; Singles – Doubles	(China) Zhang Zhizhen; 6–3, 4–6, 6–1	(China) Li Zhe	(Egypt) Mohamed Safwat (Portugal) Frederico Ferreira Silva	(Kazakhstan) Denis Yevseyev (Russia) Roman Safiullin (Japan) Go Soeda (Chinese Taipei) Jason Jung
October 28	Shenzhen Longhua Open; Shenzhen, China; Challenger 110 – hard – 48S/4Q/16D; Singles – Doubles	(Chinese Taipei) Hsieh Cheng-peng (Chinese Taipei) Yang Tsung-hua; 6–2, 7–5	(Russia) Mikhail Elgin (India) Ramkumar Ramanathan	(Egypt) Mohamed Safwat (Portugal) Frederico Ferreira Silva	(Kazakhstan) Denis Yevseyev (Russia) Roman Safiullin (Japan) Go Soeda (Chinese Taipei) Jason Jung
October 28	Charlottesville Men's Pro Challenger; Charlottesville, United States; Challenger 80 – hard (i) – 48S/4Q/16D; Singles – Doubles	(Canada) Vasek Pospisil; 7–6^{(7–2)}, 3–6, 6–2	(Canada) Brayden Schnur	(Kazakhstan) Dmitry Popko (United States) Brandon Nakashima	(Slovenia) Blaž Rola (United States) Marcos Giron (Japan) Taro Daniel (Canada) Filip Peliwo
October 28	Charlottesville Men's Pro Challenger; Charlottesville, United States; Challenger 80 – hard (i) – 48S/4Q/16D; Singles – Doubles	(United States) Mitchell Krueger (Slovenia) Blaž Rola; 6–4, 6–1	(United States) Sekou Bangoura (Slovenia) Blaž Kavčič	(Kazakhstan) Dmitry Popko (United States) Brandon Nakashima	(Slovenia) Blaž Rola (United States) Marcos Giron (Japan) Taro Daniel (Canada) Filip Peliwo
October 28	City of Playford Tennis International II; Playford, Australia; Challenger 80 – hard – 48S/4Q/16D; Singles – Doubles	(Australia) James Duckworth; 7–6^{(7–2)}, 6–4	(Japan) Yasutaka Uchiyama	(Australia) Marc Polmans (Japan) Tatsuma Ito	(Australia) Andrew Harris (Australia) Luke Saville (Australia) Alex Bolt (United Kingdom) Jay Clarke
October 28	City of Playford Tennis International II; Playford, Australia; Challenger 80 – hard – 48S/4Q/16D; Singles – Doubles	(Finland) Harri Heliövaara (Finland) Patrik Niklas-Salminen; 6–4, 6–7^{(4–7)}, [10–7]	(Philippines) Ruben Gonzales (United States) Evan King	(Australia) Marc Polmans (Japan) Tatsuma Ito	(Australia) Andrew Harris (Australia) Luke Saville (Australia) Alex Bolt (United Kingdom) Jay Clarke
October 28	Challenger Eckental; Eckental, Germany; Challenger 80 – carpet (i) – 48S/4Q/16D; Singles – Doubles	(Czech Republic) Jiří Veselý; 6–4, 4–6, 6–3	(Belgium) Steve Darcis	(South Africa) Lloyd Harris (Russia) Evgeny Karlovskiy	(Ukraine) Illya Marchenko (Slovakia) Lukáš Lacko (Germany) Peter Gojowczyk (Netherlands) Botic van de Zandschulp
October 28	Challenger Eckental; Eckental, Germany; Challenger 80 – carpet (i) – 48S/4Q/16D; Singles – Doubles	(United Kingdom) Ken Skupski (Australia) John-Patrick Smith; 7–6^{(7–2)}, 6–4	(Netherlands) Sander Arends (Czech Republic) Roman Jebavý	(South Africa) Lloyd Harris (Russia) Evgeny Karlovskiy	(Ukraine) Illya Marchenko (Slovakia) Lukáš Lacko (Germany) Peter Gojowczyk (Netherlands) Botic van de Zandschulp
October 28	Challenger Ciudad de Guayaquil; Guayaquil, Ecuador; Challenger 80 – clay – 48S/4Q/16D; Singles – Doubles	(Brazil) Thiago Seyboth Wild; 6–4, 6–0	(Bolivia) Hugo Dellien	(Argentina) Federico Coria (Peru) Juan Pablo Varillas	(Argentina) Facundo Bagnis (Germany) Yannick Hanfmann (Argentina) Francisco Cerúndolo (Argentina) Leonardo Mayer
October 28	Challenger Ciudad de Guayaquil; Guayaquil, Ecuador; Challenger 80 – clay – 48S/4Q/16D; Singles – Doubles	(Uruguay) Ariel Behar (Ecuador) Gonzalo Escobar; 7–6^{(7–4)}, 7–6^{(7–5)}	(Brazil) Pedro Sakamoto (Brazil) Thiago Seyboth Wild	(Argentina) Federico Coria (Peru) Juan Pablo Varillas	(Argentina) Facundo Bagnis (Germany) Yannick Hanfmann (Argentina) Francisco Cerúndolo (Argentina) Leonardo Mayer

=== November ===
Week of	Tournament	Champions	Runners-up	Semifinalists	Quarterfinalists
November 4	Slovak Open; Bratislava, Slovakia; Challenger 110 – hard (i) – 48S/4Q/16D; Singles – Doubles	(Austria) Dennis Novak; 6–1, 6–1	(Bosnia and Herzegovina) Damir Džumhur	(Czech Republic) Zdeněk Kolář (Belarus) Egor Gerasimov	(Kazakhstan) Mikhail Kukushkin (South Africa) Lloyd Harris (Italy) Stefano Travaglia (Belarus) Ilya Ivashka
November 4	Slovak Open; Bratislava, Slovakia; Challenger 110 – hard (i) – 48S/4Q/16D; Singles – Doubles	(Denmark) Frederik Nielsen (Germany) Tim Pütz; 4–6, 7–6^{(7–4)}, [11–9]	(Czech Republic) Roman Jebavý (Slovakia) Igor Zelenay	(Czech Republic) Zdeněk Kolář (Belarus) Egor Gerasimov	(Kazakhstan) Mikhail Kukushkin (South Africa) Lloyd Harris (Italy) Stefano Travaglia (Belarus) Ilya Ivashka
November 4	Knoxville Challenger; Knoxville, United States; Challenger 80 – hard (i) – 48S/4Q/16D; Singles – Doubles	(United States) Michael Mmoh; 6–4, 6–4	(Australia) Christopher O'Connell	(United States) Tommy Paul (United Kingdom) Liam Broady	(Slovenia) Blaž Rola (United States) Ernesto Escobedo (United States) Aleksandar Kovacevic (Netherlands) Gijs Brouwer
November 4	Knoxville Challenger; Knoxville, United States; Challenger 80 – hard (i) – 48S/4Q/16D; Singles – Doubles	(Mexico) Hans Hach Verdugo (Spain) Adrián Menéndez Maceiras; 7–6^{(8–6)}, 4–6, [10–5]	(United States) Bradley Klahn (Netherlands) Sem Verbeek	(United States) Tommy Paul (United Kingdom) Liam Broady	(Slovenia) Blaž Rola (United States) Ernesto Escobedo (United States) Aleksandar Kovacevic (Netherlands) Gijs Brouwer
November 4	Kobe Challenger; Kobe, Japan; Challenger 80 – hard (i) – 48S/4Q/16D; Singles – Doubles	(Japan) Yosuke Watanuki; 6–2, 6–4	(Japan) Yūichi Sugita	(Netherlands) Tim van Rijthoven (Japan) Shintaro Imai	(South Korea) Nam Ji-sung (Japan) Go Soeda (Japan) Hiroki Moriya (India) Ramkumar Ramanathan
November 4	Kobe Challenger; Kobe, Japan; Challenger 80 – hard (i) – 48S/4Q/16D; Singles – Doubles	(India) Purav Raja (India) Ramkumar Ramanathan; 7–6^{(8–6)}, 6–3	(Sweden) André Göransson (Indonesia) Christopher Rungkat	(Netherlands) Tim van Rijthoven (Japan) Shintaro Imai	(South Korea) Nam Ji-sung (Japan) Go Soeda (Japan) Hiroki Moriya (India) Ramkumar Ramanathan
November 4	Uruguay Open; Montevideo, Uruguay; Challenger 80 – clay – 48S/4Q/16D; Singles – Doubles	(Spain) Jaume Munar; 7–5, 6–2	(Argentina) Federico Delbonis	(Argentina) Juan Manuel Cerúndolo (Brazil) Thiago Seyboth Wild	(Argentina) Facundo Bagnis (Slovakia) Andrej Martin (Argentina) Andrea Collarini (Bolivia) Hugo Dellien
November 4	Uruguay Open; Montevideo, Uruguay; Challenger 80 – clay – 48S/4Q/16D; Singles – Doubles	(Argentina) Facundo Bagnis (Argentina) Andrés Molteni; 6–4, 5–7, [12–10]	(Brazil) Orlando Luz (Brazil) Rafael Matos	(Argentina) Juan Manuel Cerúndolo (Brazil) Thiago Seyboth Wild	(Argentina) Facundo Bagnis (Slovakia) Andrej Martin (Argentina) Andrea Collarini (Bolivia) Hugo Dellien
November 11	Oracle Challenger Series – Houston; Houston, United States; Challenger 125 – hard – 48S/4Q/16D; Singles – Doubles	(United States) Marcos Giron; 7–5, 6–7^{(5–7)}, 7–6^{(11–9)}	(Croatia) Ivo Karlović	(United States) Mitchell Krueger (Australia) Christopher O'Connell	(United States) Michael Redlicki (Chinese Taipei) Jason Jung (Canada) Alexis Galarneau (United States) Michael Mmoh
November 11	Oracle Challenger Series – Houston; Houston, United States; Challenger 125 – hard – 48S/4Q/16D; Singles – Doubles	(Israel) Jonathan Erlich (Mexico) Santiago González; 6–3, 7–6^{(7–4)}	(Uruguay) Ariel Behar (Ecuador) Gonzalo Escobar	(United States) Mitchell Krueger (Australia) Christopher O'Connell	(United States) Michael Redlicki (Chinese Taipei) Jason Jung (Canada) Alexis Galarneau (United States) Michael Mmoh
November 11	JSM Challenger of Champaign–Urbana; Champaign, United States; Challenger 80 – hard (i) – 48S/4Q/16D; Singles – Doubles	(United States) J. J. Wolf; 6–4, 6–7^{(3–7)}, 7–6^{(8–6)}	(United States) Sebastian Korda	(Slovenia) Blaž Kavčič (United States) Alexander Brown	(United States) Stefan Kozlov (United States) Keegan Smith (United States) Martin Redlicki (Argentina) Juan Pablo Ficovich
November 11	JSM Challenger of Champaign–Urbana; Champaign, United States; Challenger 80 – hard (i) – 48S/4Q/16D; Singles – Doubles	(United States) Christopher Eubanks (United States) Kevin King; 7–5, 6–3	(United Kingdom) Evan Hoyt (United States) Martin Redlicki	(Slovenia) Blaž Kavčič (United States) Alexander Brown	(United States) Stefan Kozlov (United States) Keegan Smith (United States) Martin Redlicki (Argentina) Juan Pablo Ficovich
November 11	Tali Open; Helsinki, Finland; Challenger 80 – hard (i) – 48S/4Q/16D; Singles – Doubles	(Finland) Emil Ruusuvuori; 6–3, 6–7^{(4–7)}, 6–2	(Egypt) Mohamed Safwat	(Belarus) Ilya Ivashka (Spain) Carlos Taberner	(Finland) Harri Heliövaara (Slovakia) Alex Molčan (Ukraine) Sergiy Stakhovsky (Sweden) Elias Ymer
November 11	Tali Open; Helsinki, Finland; Challenger 80 – hard (i) – 48S/4Q/16D; Singles – Doubles	(Denmark) Frederik Nielsen (Germany) Tim Pütz; 7–6^{(7–2)}, 6–0	(Croatia) Tomislav Draganja (Russia) Pavel Kotov	(Belarus) Ilya Ivashka (Spain) Carlos Taberner	(Finland) Harri Heliövaara (Slovakia) Alex Molčan (Ukraine) Sergiy Stakhovsky (Sweden) Elias Ymer
November 11	Sparkassen ATP Challenger; Ortisei, Italy; Challenger 80 – hard (i) – 48S/4Q/16D; Singles – Doubles	(Italy) Jannik Sinner; 6–2, 6–4	(Austria) Sebastian Ofner	(Italy) Luca Vanni (France) Antoine Hoang	(Germany) Peter Gojowczyk (Italy) Lorenzo Musetti (France) Elliot Benchetrit (Italy) Federico Gaio
November 11	Sparkassen ATP Challenger; Ortisei, Italy; Challenger 80 – hard (i) – 48S/4Q/16D; Singles – Doubles	(Serbia) Nikola Ćaćić (Croatia) Antonio Šančić; 6–7^{(5–7)}, 7–6^{(7–3)}, [10–7]	(Netherlands) Sander Arends (Netherlands) David Pel	(Italy) Luca Vanni (France) Antoine Hoang	(Germany) Peter Gojowczyk (Italy) Lorenzo Musetti (France) Elliot Benchetrit (Italy) Federico Gaio
November 11	KPIT MSLTA Challenger; Pune, India; Challenger 80 – hard – 48S/4Q/16D; Singles – Doubles	(Australia) James Duckworth; 4–6, 6–4, 6–4	(United Kingdom) Jay Clarke	(Spain) Roberto Ortega Olmedo (India) Ramkumar Ramanathan	(Netherlands) Tim van Rijthoven (Canada) Steven Diez (India) Sumit Nagal (India) Sasikumar Mukund
November 11	KPIT MSLTA Challenger; Pune, India; Challenger 80 – hard – 48S/4Q/16D; Singles – Doubles	(India) Purav Raja (India) Ramkumar Ramanathan; 7–6^{(7–3)}, 6–3	(India) Arjun Kadhe (India) Saketh Myneni	(Spain) Roberto Ortega Olmedo (India) Ramkumar Ramanathan	(Netherlands) Tim van Rijthoven (Canada) Steven Diez (India) Sumit Nagal (India) Sasikumar Mukund
November 18	Maia Challenger; Maia, Portugal; Challenger 80 – clay (i) – 48S/4Q/16D; Singles – Doubles	(Slovakia) Jozef Kovalík; 6–0, 6–4	(France) Constant Lestienne	(Slovakia) Andrej Martin (Portugal) João Domingues	(Italy) Riccardo Bonadio (Italy) Paolo Lorenzi (Italy) Roberto Marcora (Italy) Andrea Vavassori
November 18	Maia Challenger; Maia, Portugal; Challenger 80 – clay (i) – 48S/4Q/16D; Singles – Doubles	(Germany) Andre Begemann (Germany) Daniel Masur; 7–6^{(7–2)}, 6–4	(Spain) Guillermo García López (Spain) David Vega Hernández	(Slovakia) Andrej Martin (Portugal) João Domingues	(Italy) Riccardo Bonadio (Italy) Paolo Lorenzi (Italy) Roberto Marcora (Italy) Andrea Vavassori

== Statistical information ==
These tables present the number of singles (S) and doubles (D) titles won by each player and each nation during the season. The players/nations are sorted by: 1) total number of titles (a doubles title won by two players representing the same nation counts as only one win for the nation); 2) a singles > doubles hierarchy; 3) alphabetical order (by family names for players).

To avoid confusion and double counting, these tables should be updated only after an event is completed.

=== Titles won by player ===
Total	Player	S	D	S	D
7	Max Purcell (AUS)		● ● ● ● ● ● ●	0	7
7	Luke Saville (AUS)		● ● ● ● ● ● ●	0	7
6	Emil Ruusuvuori (FIN)	● ● ● ●	● ●	4	2
6	Ariel Behar (URU)		● ● ● ● ● ●	0	6
6	Gonzalo Escobar (ECU)		● ● ● ● ● ●	0	6
6	Hsieh Cheng-peng (TPE)		● ● ● ● ● ●	0	6
6	Filip Polášek (SVK)		● ● ● ● ● ●	0	6
6	Andrei Vasilevski (BLR)		● ● ● ● ● ●	0	6
5	Sander Arends (NED)		● ● ● ● ●	0	5
5	Tomislav Brkić (BIH)		● ● ● ● ●	0	5
5	Ante Pavić (CRO)		● ● ● ● ●	0	5
5	Fernando Romboli (BRA)		● ● ● ● ●	0	5
4	Ričardas Berankis (LTU)	● ● ● ●		4	0
4	James Duckworth (AUS)	● ● ● ●		4	0
4	Mikael Ymer (SWE)	● ● ● ●		4	0
4	Gianluca Mager (ITA)	● ● ●	●	3	1
4	Andrej Martin (SVK)	● ● ●	●	3	1
4	Marcos Giron (USA)	● ●	● ●	2	2
4	Marc Polmans (AUS)	● ●	● ●	2	2
4	Romain Arneodo (MON)		● ● ● ●	0	4
4	Andre Begemann (GER)		● ● ● ●	0	4
4	Robert Galloway (USA)		● ● ● ●	0	4
4	Kevin Krawietz (GER)		● ● ● ●	0	4
4	Nathaniel Lammons (USA)		● ● ● ●	0	4
4	Roberto Maytín (VEN)		● ● ● ●	0	4
4	(France) / Hugo Nys (MON)^{1}		● ● ● ●	0	4
4	Gonçalo Oliveira (POR)		● ● ● ●	0	4
4	Philipp Oswald (AUT)		● ● ● ●	0	4
4	Christopher Rungkat (INA)		● ● ● ●	0	4
3	Pablo Andújar (ESP)	● ● ●		3	0
3	Alexander Bublik (KAZ)	● ● ●		3	0
3	Ugo Humbert (FRA)	● ● ●		3	0
3	Thiago Monteiro (BRA)	● ● ●		3	0
3	Tommy Paul (USA)	● ● ●		3	0
3	Jannik Sinner (ITA)	● ● ●		3	0
3	Grégoire Barrère (FRA)	● ●	●	2	1
3	Maxime Cressy (USA)	●	● ●	1	2
3	Peter Polansky (CAN)	●	● ●	1	2
3	Guido Andreozzi (ARG)		● ● ●	0	3
3	Guillermo Durán (ARG)		● ● ●	0	3
3	Jonathan Erlich (ISR)		● ● ●	0	3
3	Santiago González (MEX)		● ● ●	0	3
3	André Göransson (SWE)		● ● ●	0	3
3	Harri Heliövaara (FIN)		● ● ●	0	3
3	Florin Mergea (ROU)		● ● ●	0	3
3	Denys Molchanov (UKR)		● ● ●	0	3
3	Andrés Molteni (ARG)		● ● ●	0	3
3	David Pel (NED)		● ● ●	0	3
3	Tim Pütz (GER)		● ● ●	0	3
3	Ramkumar Ramanathan (IND)		● ● ●	0	3
3	Adil Shamasdin (CAN)		● ● ●	0	3
3	Yang Tsung-hua (TPE)		● ● ●	0	3
3	Igor Zelenay (SVK)		● ● ●	0	3
2	Roberto Carballés Baena (ESP)	● ●		2	0
2	Pablo Cuevas (URU)	● ●		2	0
2	Alejandro Davidovich Fokina (ESP)	● ●		2	0
2	Hugo Dellien (BOL)	● ●		2	0
2	Dan Evans (GBR)	● ●		2	0
2	Norbert Gombos (SVK)	● ●		2	0
2	Yannick Hanfmann (GER)	● ●		2	0
2	Jozef Kovalík (SVK)	● ●		2	0
2	Kwon Soon-woo (KOR)	● ●		2	0
2	Henri Laaksonen (SUI)	● ●		2	0
2	Kamil Majchrzak (POL)	● ●		2	0
2	Corentin Moutet (FRA)	● ●		2	0
2	Dennis Novak (AUT)	● ●		2	0
2	Christopher O'Connell (AUS)	● ●		2	0
2	Danilo Petrović (SRB)	● ●		2	0
2	Vasek Pospisil (CAN)	● ●		2	0
2	Tommy Robredo (ESP)	● ●		2	0
2	Pedro Sousa (POR)	● ●		2	0
2	Yūichi Sugita (JPN)	● ●		2	0
2	Stefano Travaglia (ITA)	● ●		2	0
2	Yasutaka Uchiyama (JPN)	● ●		2	0
2	Juan Pablo Varillas (PER)	● ●		2	0
2	J. J. Wolf (USA)	● ●		2	0
2	Zhang Zhizhen (CHN)	● ●		2	0
2	Dustin Brown (GER)	●	●	1	1
2	Matías Franco Descotte (ARG)	●	●	1	1
2	Marcel Granollers (ESP)	●	●	1	1
2	Lloyd Harris (RSA)	●	●	1	1
2	Marc-Andrea Hüsler (SUI)	●	●	1	1
2	Bradley Klahn (USA)	●	●	1	1
2	Mitchell Krueger (USA)	●	●	1	1
2	Illya Marchenko (UKR)	●	●	1	1
2	Michael Mmoh (USA)	●	●	1	1
2	Sebastian Ofner (AUT)	●	●	1	1
2	Blaž Rola (SLO)	●	●	1	1
2	Dudi Sela (ISR)	●	●	1	1
2	JC Aragone (USA)		● ●	0	2
2	Marcelo Arévalo (ESA)		● ●	0	2
2	Ruben Bemelmans (BEL)		● ●	0	2
2	Simone Bolelli (ITA)		● ●	0	2
2	Nikola Čačić (SRB)		● ●	0	2
2	Scott Clayton (GBR)		● ●	0	2
2	Sadio Doumbia (FRA)		● ●	0	2
2	Andrey Golubev (KAZ)		● ●	0	2
2	Gong Maoxin (CHN)		● ●	0	2
2	Gerard Granollers (ESP)		● ●	0	2
2	Laurynas Grigelis (LTU)		● ●	0	2
2	Quentin Halys (FRA)		● ●	0	2
2	Darian King (BAR)		● ●	0	2
2	Evan King (USA)		● ●	0	2
2	Zdeněk Kolář (CZE)		● ●	0	2
2	Orlando Luz (BRA)		● ●	0	2
2	Luca Margaroli (SUI)		● ●	0	2
2	Fabrice Martin (FRA)		● ●	0	2
2	Daniel Masur (GER)		● ●	0	2
2	Andreas Mies (GER)		● ●	0	2
2	Nam Ji-sung (KOR)		● ●	0	2
2	Aleksandr Nedovyesov (KAZ)		● ●	0	2
2	Fabrício Neis (BRA)		● ●	0	2
2	Frederik Nielsen (DEN)		● ●	0	2
2	Jonny O'Mara (GBR)		● ●	0	2
2	Andrea Pellegrino (ITA)		● ●	0	2
2	Aisam-ul-Haq Qureshi (PAK)		● ●	0	2
2	Purav Raja (IND)		● ●	0	2
2	Fabien Reboul (FRA)		● ●	0	2
2	Martin Redlicki (USA)		● ●	0	2
2	Miguel Ángel Reyes-Varela (MEX)		● ●	0	2
2	Ken Skupski (GBR)		● ●	0	2
2	John-Patrick Smith (AUS)		● ●	0	2
2	Song Min-kyu (KOR)		● ●	0	2
2	David Vega Hernández (ESP)		● ●	0	2
2	Sem Verbeek (NED)		● ●	0	2
2	Tristan-Samuel Weissborn (AUT)		● ●	0	2
2	Jackson Withrow (USA)		● ●	0	2
2	Zhang Ze (CHN)		● ●	0	2
1	Marcos Baghdatis (CYP)	●		1	0
1	Aljaž Bedene (SLO)	●		1	0
1	Matteo Berrettini (ITA)	●		1	0
1	Salvatore Caruso (ITA)	●		1	0
1	Chung Hyeon (KOR)	●		1	0
1	Jay Clarke (GBR)	●		1	0
1	Andrea Collarini (ARG)	●		1	0
1	Federico Coria (ARG)	●		1	0
1	Federico Delbonis (ARG)	●		1	0
1	Steven Diez (CAN)	●		1	0
1	João Domingues (POR)	●		1	0
1	Evgeny Donskoy (RUS)	●		1	0
1	Rogério Dutra Silva (BRA)	●		1	0
1	Kyle Edmund (GBR)	●		1	0
1	Ernesto Escobedo (USA)	●		1	0
1	Taylor Fritz (USA)	●		1	0
1	Federico Gaio (ITA)	●		1	0
1	Egor Gerasimov (BLR)	●		1	0
1	Alessandro Giannessi (ITA)	●		1	0
1	Lorenzo Giustino (ITA)	●		1	0
1	Emilio Gómez (ECU)	●		1	0
1	Tallon Griekspoor (NED)	●		1	0
1	Hubert Hurkacz (POL)	●		1	0
1	Steve Johnson (USA)	●		1	0
1	Jason Jung (TPE)	●		1	0
1	Dominik Koepfer (GER)	●		1	0
1	Filip Krajinović (SRB)	●		1	0
1	Jason Kubler (AUS)	●		1	0
1	Nicola Kuhn (ESP)	●		1	0
1	Lukáš Lacko (SVK)	●		1	0
1	Enrique López Pérez (ESP)	●		1	0
1	Facundo Mena (ARG)	●		1	0
1	João Menezes (BRA)	●		1	0
1	John Millman (AUS)	●		1	0
1	Nikola Milojević (SRB)	●		1	0
1	Mats Moraing (GER)	●		1	0
1	Jaume Munar (ESP)	●		1	0
1	Sumit Nagal (IND)	●		1	0
1	Renzo Olivo (ARG)	●		1	0
1	Lucas Pouille (FRA)	●		1	0
1	Andreas Seppi (ITA)	●		1	0
1	Thiago Seyboth Wild (BRA)	●		1	0
1	Lorenzo Sonego (ITA)	●		1	0
1	Mikael Torpegaard (DEN)	●		1	0
1	Marco Trungelliti (ARG)	●		1	0
1	Jo-Wilfried Tsonga (FRA)	●		1	0
1	Botic van de Zandschulp (NED)	●		1	0
1	Jiří Veselý (CZE)	●		1	0
1	Mario Vilella Martínez (ESP)	●		1	0
1	Yosuke Watanuki (JPN)	●		1	0
1	Franco Agamenone (ARG)		●	0	1
1	Facundo Bagnis (ARG)		●	0	1
1	Sriram Balaji (IND)		●	0	1
1	Sekou Bangoura (USA)		●	0	1
1	Thomaz Bellucci (BRA)		●	0	1
1	James Cerretani (USA)		●	0	1
1	Martín Cuevas (URU)		●	0	1
1	Marcus Daniell (NZL)		●	0	1
1	Thiemo de Bakker (NED)		●	0	1
1	Marcelo Demoliner (BRA)		●	0	1
1	Corentin Denolly (FRA)		●	0	1
1	Matthew Ebden (AUS)		●	0	1
1	Moez Echargui (TUN)		●	0	1
1	Mikhail Elgin (RUS)		●	0	1
1	Christopher Eubanks (USA)		●	0	1
1	Jonáš Forejtek (CZE)		●	0	1
1	Teymuraz Gabashvili (RUS)		●	0	1
1	Gao Xin (CHN)		●	0	1
1	Sander Gillé (BEL)		●	0	1
1	Carlos Gómez-Herrera (ESP)		●	0	1
1	Ruben Gonzales (PHI)		●	0	1
1	Robin Haase (NED)		●	0	1
1	Hans Hach Verdugo (MEX)		●	0	1
1	Andrew Harris (AUS)		●	0	1
1	Diego Hidalgo (ECU)		●	0	1
1	Denis Istomin (UZB)		●	0	1
1	Arjun Kadhe (IND)		●	0	1
1	Kevin King (USA)		●	0	1
1	Tristan Lamasine (FRA)		●	0	1
1	Alex Lawson (USA)		●	0	1
1	Li Zhe (CHN)		●	0	1
1	Robert Lindstedt (SWE)		●	0	1
1	Paolo Lorenzi (ITA)		●	0	1
1	Skander Mansouri (TUN)		●	0	1
1	David Marrero (ESP)		●	0	1
1	Pedro Martínez (ESP)		●	0	1
1	Rafael Matos (BRA)		●	0	1
1	Ben McLachlan (JPN)		●	0	1
1	Jürgen Melzer (AUT)		●	0	1
1	Adrián Menéndez Maceiras (ESP)		●	0	1
1	Lucas Miedler (AUT)		●	0	1
1	Alexandre Müller (FRA)		●	0	1
1	Jamie Murray (GBR)		●	0	1
1	Saketh Myneni (IND)		●	0	1
1	Patrik Niklas-Salminen (FIN)		●	0	1
1	Dennis Novikov (USA)		●	0	1
1	Nathan Pasha (USA)		●	0	1
1	Adam Pavlásek (CZE)		●	0	1
1	Hans Podlipnik Castillo (CHI)		●	0	1
1	Hunter Reese (USA)		●	0	1
1	Matt Reid (AUS)		●	0	1
1	Jurij Rodionov (AUT)		●	0	1
1	Ruan Roelofse (RSA)		●	0	1
1	Ivan Sabanov (CRO)		●	0	1
1	Matej Sabanov (CRO)		●	0	1
1	Antonio Šančić (CRO)		●	0	1
1	Bernardo Saraiva (POR)		●	0	1
1	Divij Sharan (IND)		●	0	1
1	Neal Skupski (GBR)		●	0	1
1	Sun Fajing (CHN)		●	0	1
1	Andrea Vavassori (ITA)		●	0	1
1	Joran Vliegen (BEL)		●	0	1
1	Michael Vrbenský (CZE)		●	0	1
1	Donald Young (USA)		●	0	1

=== Titles won by nation ===
Total	Nation	S	D
34	United States (USA)	14	20
22	Spain (ESP)	14	8
22	Australia (AUS)	10	12
21	Italy (ITA)	15	6
18	France (FRA)	9	9
18	Slovakia (SVK)	8	10
18	Germany (GER)	5	13
16	Brazil (BRA)	6	10
15	Argentina (ARG)	7	8
12	Austria (AUT)	3	9
10	Great Britain (GBR)	4	6
10	Netherlands (NED)	2	8
9	Canada (CAN)	4	5
9	Uruguay (URU)	2	7
8	Finland (FIN)	4	4
8	Sweden (SWE)	4	4
8	Portugal (POR)	3	5
8	Chinese Taipei (TPE)	1	7
8	Ecuador (ECU)	1	7
7	Belarus (BLR)	1	6
7	India (IND)	1	6
7	Croatia (CRO)	0	7
6	Japan (JPN)	5	1
6	Lithuania (LTU)	4	2
6	Serbia (SRB)	4	2
6	Switzerland (SUI)	3	3
6	China (CHN)	2	4
6	Mexico (MEX)	0	6
5	Kazakhstan (KAZ)	3	2
5	South Korea (KOR)	3	2
5	Israel (ISR)	1	4
5	Ukraine (UKR)	1	4
5	Bosnia and Herzegovina (BIH)	0	5
4	Czech Republic (CZE)	1	3
4	Indonesia (INA)	0	4
4	Monaco (MON)	0	4
4	Venezuela (VEN)	0	4
3	Poland (POL)	3	0
3	Slovenia (SLO)	2	1
3	Denmark (DEN)	1	2
3	Russia (RUS)	1	2
3	South Africa (RSA)	1	2
3	Belgium (BEL)	0	3
3	Romania (ROU)	0	3
2	Bolivia (BOL)	2	0
2	Peru (PER)	2	0
2	Barbados (BAR)	0	2
2	El Salvador (ESA)	0	2
2	Pakistan (PAK)	0	2
1	Cyprus (CYP)	1	0
1	Chile (CHI)	0	1
1	New Zealand (NZL)	0	1
1	Philippines (PHI)	0	1
1	Tunisia (TUN)	0	1
1	Uzbekistan (UZB)	0	1

- ^{1} Hugo Nys switched nationalities during the year to represent Monaco. He won three titles under the French flag and one title under the Monegasque flag.

== Point distribution ==
Points are awarded as follows:

Tournament Category	Singles									Doubles				
Tournament Category	W	F	SF	QF	R16	R32	R48	Q	Q1	W	F	SF	QF	R16
Challenger 125	125	75	45	25	10	5	0	0	0	125	75	45	25	0
Challenger 110	110	65	40	20	9	5	0	0	0	110	65	40	20	0
Challenger 100	100	60	35	18	8	5	0	0	0	100	60	35	18	0
Challenger 90	90	55	33	17	8	5	0	0	0	90	55	33	17	0
Challenger 80	80	48	29	15	7	3	0	0	0	80	48	29	15	0
