= 2024 Internazionali di Tennis Città di Perugia – Singles =

Singles
- 2024 Internazionali di Tennis Città di Perugia

Final
- Champion: (Italy) Luciano Darderi
- Runner-up: (India) Sumit Nagal
- Score: 6–1, 6–2

Events
Singles	Doubles
← 2023 ·	Internazionali di Tennis Città di Perugia	· 2025 →

Fábián Marozsán was the defending champion but chose not to defend his title.

Luciano Darderi won the title after defeating Sumit Nagal 6–1, 6–2 in the final.

== Seeds ==
1. (Italy) Luciano Darderi (champion)
2. (Serbia) Laslo Djere (quarterfinals)
3. (Croatia) Borna Ćorić (second round)
4. (Germany) Daniel Altmaier (semifinals)
5. (Italy) Fabio Fognini (quarterfinals)
6. (India) Sumit Nagal (final)
7. (Argentina) Francisco Comesaña (first round)
8. (Italy) Francesco Passaro (quarterfinals)

== Draw ==
=== Key ===
- Q = Qualifier
- WC = Wild card
- LL = Lucky loser
- Alt = Alternate
- ITF = ITF entry
- PR = Protected ranking
- SR = Special ranking
- SE = Special exempt
- JE = Junior exempt
- JR = Junior Accelerator Programme entrant
- CO = College Accelerator Programme entrant
- NG = Next Gen Accelerator Program entrant
- w/o = Walkover
- r = Retired
- d = Defaulted

=== Finals ===
Semifinals
1/WC	(Italy) Luciano Darderi	7^{7}	6
4	(Germany) Daniel Altmaier	6^{4}	3
6	(India) Sumit Nagal	7^{7}	1	6
(Spain) Bernabé Zapata Miralles	6^{2}	6	2

Final
1/WC	(Italy) Luciano Darderi	6	6
6	(India) Sumit Nagal	1	2

=== Top half ===
First round
1/WC	(Italy) L Darderi	6	6
WC	(Italy) F Cinà	3	0
Q	(Italy) G Fonio	3	5
(Italy) A Pellegrino	6	7
(Italy) M Gigante	7	6
Q	(Italy) Samuel Vincent Ruggeri	5	3
(Italy) E Dalla Valle	1	6	1
5/WC	(Italy) F Fognini	6	1	6
4	(Germany) D Altmaier	6	6
(Spain) N Sánchez Izquierdo	2	3
(Italy) S Travaglia	6	6
(Chinese Taipei) C-h Tseng	4	1
Q	(Italy) G Oradini	3	6	3
(Italy) F Agamenone	6	2	6
(Dominican Republic) N Hardt	1	4
8	(Italy) F Passaro	6	6

Second round
1/WC	(Italy) L Darderi	6	6
(Italy) A Pellegrino	3	3
(Italy) M Gigante	4	5
5/WC	(Italy) F Fognini	6	7
4	(Germany) D Altmaier	6	7^{7}
(Italy) S Travaglia	3	6^{4}
(Italy) F Agamenone	1	3
8	(Italy) F Passaro	6	6

Quarterfinals
1/WC	(Italy) L Darderi	6	6
5/WC	(Italy) F Fognini	1	2
4	(Germany) D Altmaier	6	7
8	(Italy) F Passaro	2	5

Semifinals
1/WC	(Italy) L Darderi	7^{7}	6
4	(Germany) D Altmaier	6^{4}	3

=== Bottom half ===
First round
6	(India) S Nagal	7^{7}	6
(Bosnia and Herzegovina) N Fatić	6^{1}	2
Q	(Italy) A Giannessi	6	6
Alt	E Gerasimov	4	2
Alt	(Poland) M Kaśnikowski	6	6
(Italy) F Maestrelli	3	3
(Italy) G Zeppieri	6	5	4
3	(Croatia) B Ćorić	3	7	6
7	(Argentina) F Comesaña	2	1
(Spain) B Zapata Miralles	6	6
LL	(Italy) G Mager	6^{5}	5
Q	(Italy) F Arnaboldi	7^{7}	7
Q	(Italy) R Bonadio	5	5
(Netherlands) J de Jong	7	7
(Bulgaria) D Kuzmanov	4	5
2	(Serbia) L Djere	6	7

Second round
6	(India) S Nagal	0	7	7^{7}
Q	(Italy) A Giannessi	6	5	6^{5}
Alt	(Poland) M Kaśnikowski	7	6
3	(Croatia) B Ćorić	5	4
(Spain) B Zapata Miralles	6	6
Q	(Italy) F Arnaboldi	4	4
(Netherlands) J de Jong	4	5
2	(Serbia) L Djere	6	7

Quarterfinals
6	(India) S Nagal	6	7
Alt	(Poland) M Kaśnikowski	4	5
(Spain) B Zapata Miralles	6	6
2	(Serbia) L Djere	3	3

Semifinals
6	(India) S Nagal	7^{7}	1	6
(Spain) B Zapata Miralles	6^{2}	6	2
