= 2025 Internazionali di Tennis Città di Perugia – Doubles =

Doubles
- 2025 Internazionali di Tennis Città di Perugia

Final
- Champions: (Monaco) Romain Arneodo (France) Manuel Guinard
- Runners-up: (Netherlands) Robin Haase (United States) Vasil Kirkov
- Score: 3–6, 6–3, [10–5]

Events
Singles	Doubles
← 2024 ·	Internazionali di Tennis Città di Perugia	· 2026 →

Guido Andreozzi and Miguel Ángel Reyes-Varela were the defending champions but chose not to defend their title.

Romain Arneodo and Manuel Guinard won the title after defeating Robin Haase and Vasil Kirkov 3–6, 6–3, [10–5] in the final.

== Seeds ==
1. (Monaco) Romain Arneodo / (France) Manuel Guinard (champions)
2. (Netherlands) Robin Haase / (United States) Vasil Kirkov (final)
3. (Spain) Íñigo Cervantes / (Argentina) Guillermo Durán (semifinals)
4. (Italy) Marco Bortolotti / (Colombia) Cristian Rodríguez (first round)

== Draw ==
=== Key ===
- Q = Qualifier
- WC = Wild card
- LL = Lucky loser
- Alt = Alternate
- ITF = ITF entry
- PR = Protected ranking
- SR = Special ranking
- SE = Special exempt
- JE = Junior exempt
- JR = Junior Accelerator Programme entrant
- CO = College Accelerator Programme entrant
- NG = Next Gen Accelerator Program entrant
- w/o = Walkover
- r = Retired
- d = Defaulted

=== Draw ===
First round
1	(Monaco) R Arneodo (France) M Guinard	7^{7}	6
(Spain) O Roca Batalla (Ukraine) V Sachko	6^{5}	3
(Italy) F Maestrelli (Czech Republic) D Svrčina	3	1
(Bosnia and Herzegovina) N Fatić (Italy) Andrea Picchione	6	6
3	(Spain) Í Cervantes (Argentina) G Durán	4	6	[10]
(Italy) A Pellegrino (Italy) G Ricca	6	3	[8]
(France) L Pavlovic (Italy) Augusto Virgili	4	7^{9}	[10]
WC	(Italy) Alessio De Bernardis (Italy) S Travaglia	6	6^{7}	[8]
(Romania) A Jecan (Romania) B Pavel	2	6	[10]
WC	(Italy) Pierluigi Basile (Italy) Lorenzo Carboni	6	3	[5]
(Mexico) R Pacheco Méndez (Australia) B Tomic	4	6	[10]
4	(Italy) M Bortolotti (Colombia) C Rodríguez	6	3	[8]
(Serbia) M Sabanov (Croatia) N Serdarušić	5	6^{6}
(Poland) S Kielan (Poland) F Pieczonka	7	7^{8}
(Italy) F Bondioli (Italy) F Forti	6	6^{4}	[8]
2	(Netherlands) R Haase (United States) V Kirkov	4	7^{7}	[10]

Quarterfinals
1	(Monaco) R Arneodo (France) M Guinard	6	6
(Bosnia and Herzegovina) N Fatić (Italy) A Picchione	0	4
3	(Spain) Í Cervantes (Argentina) G Durán	6	3	[10]
(France) L Pavlovic (Italy) A Virgili	4	6	[5]
(Romania) A Jecan (Romania) B Pavel	5	7^{7}	[10]
(Mexico) R Pacheco Méndez (Australia) B Tomic	7	6^{5}	[4]
(Poland) S Kielan (Poland) F Pieczonka	7^{7}	6^{3}	[7]
2	(Netherlands) R Haase (United States) V Kirkov	6^{5}	7^{7}	[10]

Semifinals
1	(Monaco) R Arneodo (France) M Guinard	6	6
3	(Spain) Í Cervantes (Argentina) G Durán	2	0
(Romania) A Jecan (Romania) B Pavel	4	1
2	(Netherlands) R Haase (United States) V Kirkov	6	6

Final
1	(Monaco) R Arneodo (France) M Guinard	3	6	[10]
2	(Netherlands) R Haase (United States) V Kirkov	6	3	[5]
