= 2022 Internazionali di Tennis Città di Perugia – Doubles =

Doubles
- 2022 Internazionali di Tennis Città di Perugia

Final
- Champions: (France) Sadio Doumbia (France) Fabien Reboul
- Runners-up: (Italy) Marco Bortolotti (Spain) Sergio Martos Gornés
- Score: 6–2, 6–4

Events
Singles	Doubles
← 2021 ·	Internazionali di Tennis Città di Perugia	· 2023 →

Vitaliy Sachko and Dominic Stricker were the defending champions but chose not to defend their title.

Sadio Doumbia and Fabien Reboul won the title after defeating Marco Bortolotti and Sergio Martos Gornés 6–2, 6–4 in the final.

== Seeds ==
1. (Colombia) Nicolás Barrientos / (Mexico) Miguel Ángel Reyes-Varela (semifinals)
2. (Serbia) Ivan Sabanov / (Serbia) Matej Sabanov (semifinals)
3. (United States) Nathaniel Lammons / (France) Albano Olivetti (first round)
4. (France) Sadio Doumbia / (France) Fabien Reboul (champions)

== Draw ==
=== Key ===
- Q = Qualifier
- WC = Wild card
- LL = Lucky loser
- Alt = Alternate
- SE = Special exempt
- PR = Protected ranking
- ITF = ITF entry
- JE = Junior exempt
- w/o = Walkover
- r = Retired
- d = Defaulted
- SR = Special ranking

First round
1	(Colombia) N Barrientos (Mexico) MÁ Reyes-Varela	w/o
(Portugal) G Elias (Peru) JP Varillas
(Italy) L Darderi (Brazil) F Romboli	6	7^{10}
(Spain) R Carballés Baena (Brazil) T Monteiro	1	6^{8}
3	(United States) N Lammons (France) A Olivetti	4	6^{3}
(Ecuador) D Hidalgo (Colombia) C Rodríguez	6	7^{7}
WC	(Spain) D Marrero (United States) Dhruva Mulye	3	2
(Italy) M Bortolotti (Spain) S Martos Gornés	6	6
WC	(Italy) Alessio De Bernardis (Italy) F Passaro	3	2
(Belgium) M Geerts (India) A Kadhe	6	6
(Italy) S Caruso (Italy) G Mager	5	3
4	(France) S Doumbia (France) F Reboul	7	6
(Italy) M Cecchinato (Italy) F Cobolli	4	4
2	(Serbia) I Sabanov (Serbia) M Sabanov	6	6

Quarterfinals
1	(Colombia) N Barrientos (Mexico) MÁ Reyes-Varela	4	6	[10]
(Italy) L Darderi (Brazil) F Romboli	6	2	[8]
(Ecuador) D Hidalgo (Colombia) C Rodríguez	7^{7}	4	[7]
(Italy) M Bortolotti (Spain) S Martos Gornés	6^{5}	6	[10]
(Belgium) M Geerts (India) A Kadhe	4	2
4	(France) S Doumbia (France) F Reboul	6	6
(Italy) A Arnaboldi (Italy) M Arnaldi	1	5
2	(Serbia) I Sabanov (Serbia) M Sabanov	6	7

Semifinals
1	(Colombia) N Barrientos (Mexico) MÁ Reyes-Varela	6^{4}	1
(Italy) M Bortolotti (Spain) S Martos Gornés	7^{7}	6
4	(France) S Doumbia (France) F Reboul	7^{7}	3	[10]
2	(Serbia) I Sabanov (Serbia) M Sabanov	6^{2}	6	[3]

Final
(Italy) M Bortolotti (Spain) S Martos Gornés	2	4
4	(France) S Doumbia (France) F Reboul	6	6
