= 2022 Internazionali di Tennis Città di Perugia – Singles =

Singles
- 2022 Internazionali di Tennis Città di Perugia

Final
- Champion: (Spain) Jaume Munar
- Runner-up: (Argentina) Tomás Martín Etcheverry
- Score: 6–3, 4–6, 6–1

Events
Singles	Doubles
← 2021 ·	Internazionali di Tennis Città di Perugia	· 2023 →

Tomás Martín Etcheverry was the defending champion but lost in the final to Jaume Munar.

Munar won the title after defeating Etcheverry 6–3, 4–6, 6–1 in the final.

== Seeds ==
1. (Spain) Carlos Taberner (first round)
2. (Spain) Jaume Munar (champion)
3. (Argentina) Tomás Martín Etcheverry (final)
4. (Spain) Roberto Carballés Baena (second round, retired)
5. (Brazil) Thiago Monteiro (quarterfinals)
6. (Colombia) Daniel Elahi Galán (first round)
7. (Italy) Gianluca Mager (first round)
8. (Peru) Juan Pablo Varillas (first round)

== Draw ==
=== Key ===
- Q = Qualifier
- WC = Wild card
- LL = Lucky loser
- Alt = Alternate
- SE = Special exempt
- PR = Protected ranking
- ITF = ITF entry
- JE = Junior exempt
- w/o = Walkover
- r = Retired
- d = Defaulted
- SR = Special ranking

=== Finals ===
Semifinals
Q	(Germany) Maximilian Marterer	1	6^{4}
3	(Argentina) Tomás Martín Etcheverry	6	7^{7}
Q	(Italy) Luciano Darderi	5	6	6^{5}
2	(Spain) Jaume Munar	7	3	7^{7}

Final
3	(Argentina) Tomás Martín Etcheverry	3	6	1
2	(Spain) Jaume Munar	6	4	6

=== Top half ===
First round
1	(Spain) C Taberner	6^{4}	3
Q	(Germany) M Marterer	7^{7}	6
(Italy) A Arnaboldi	7	3
LL	(Italy) F Baldi	5	1^{r}
WC	(Italy) M Gigante	3	2
Q	(Colombia) C Rodríguez	6	6
(Italy) G Zeppieri	6^{4}	7	6
6	(Colombia) DE Galán	7^{7}	5	3
3	(Argentina) TM Etcheverry	2	7^{7}	6
(Italy) M Cecchinato	6	6^{4}	3
(Kazakhstan) T Skatov	6^{4}	3
(Italy) F Cobolli	7^{7}	6
Alt	(Bosnia and Herzegovina) N Fatić	5	0^{r}
(Italy) A Giannessi	7	0
Alt	(Croatia) B Ćorić	6	6
8	(Peru) JP Varillas	3	2

Second round
Q	(Germany) M Marterer	6	3	6
(Italy) A Arnaboldi	3	6	3
Q	(Colombia) C Rodríguez	2	5
(Italy) G Zeppieri	6	7
3	(Argentina) TM Etcheverry	6	6^{5}	6
(Italy) F Cobolli	2	7^{7}	3
(Italy) A Giannessi	2	6^{6}
Alt	(Croatia) B Ćorić	6	7^{8}

Quarterfinals
Q	(Germany) M Marterer	6	3	6
(Italy) G Zeppieri	4	6	3
3	(Argentina) TM Etcheverry	6	6
Alt	(Croatia) B Ćorić	4	3

Semifinals
Q	(Germany) M Marterer	1	6^{4}
3	(Argentina) TM Etcheverry	6	7^{7}

=== Bottom half ===
First round
7	(Italy) G Mager	6^{5}	7^{7}	4
(Italy) L Nardi	7^{7}	6^{2}	6
(Portugal) G Elias	3	2
Q	(Italy) L Darderi	6	6
(Sweden) E Ymer	4	6	4
WC	(Italy) Luca Potenza	6	3	6
(Italy) F Agamenone	4	6	4
4	(Spain) R Carballés Baena	6	3	6
5	(Brazil) T Monteiro	6	6
Q	(Italy) Giorgio Tabacco	2	1
(Italy) S Caruso	7^{7}	6
Q	(Morocco) E Benchetrit	6^{3}	3
Q	(Italy) G Oradini	4	6	4
SE	(Italy) F Passaro	6	2	6
WC	(Italy) M Arnaldi	2	5
2	(Spain) J Munar	6	7

Second round
(Italy) L Nardi	7^{7}	4	2
Q	(Italy) L Darderi	6^{4}	6	6
WC	(Italy) L Potenza	6	2
4	(Spain) R Carballés Baena	1	1^{r}
5	(Brazil) T Monteiro	4	6	6
(Italy) S Caruso	6	4	3
SE	(Italy) F Passaro	6^{4}	4
2	(Spain) J Munar	7^{7}	6

Quarterfinals
Q	(Italy) L Darderi	6	6
WC	(Italy) L Potenza	0	1
5	(Brazil) T Monteiro	7^{7}	5	6^{1}
2	(Spain) J Munar	6^{5}	7	7^{7}

Semifinals
Q	(Italy) L Darderi	5	6	6^{5}
2	(Spain) J Munar	7	3	7^{7}
