= 2021 Internazionali di Tennis Città di Perugia – Singles =

Singles
- 2021 Internazionali di Tennis Città di Perugia

Final
- Champion: (Argentina) Tomás Martín Etcheverry
- Runner-up: (Ukraine) Vitaliy Sachko
- Score: 7–5, 6–2

Events
Singles	Doubles
← 2019 ·	Internazionali di Tennis Città di Perugia	· 2022 →

Federico Delbonis was the defending champion but chose not to defend his title.

Tomás Martín Etcheverry won the title after defeating Vitaliy Sachko 7–5, 6–2 in the final.

== Seeds ==
1. (Italy) Salvatore Caruso (semifinals)
2. (Slovakia) Andrej Martin (first round)
3. (Italy) Federico Gaio (first round)
4. (China) Zhang Zhizhen (second round)
5. (Italy) Thomas Fabbiano (first round)
6. (Kazakhstan) Dmitry Popko (first round)
7. (Argentina) Tomás Martín Etcheverry (champion)
8. (Argentina) Renzo Olivo (second round)

== Draw ==
=== Key ===
- Q = Qualifier
- WC = Wild card
- LL = Lucky loser
- Alt = Alternate
- SE = Special exempt
- PR = Protected ranking
- ITF = ITF entry
- JE = Junior exempt
- w/o = Walkover
- r = Retired
- d = Defaulted
- SR = Special ranking

=== Finals ===
Semifinals
1	(Italy) Salvatore Caruso	5	7	2
7	(Argentina) Tomás Martín Etcheverry	7	5	6
(Croatia) Nino Serdarušić	4	5
(Ukraine) Vitaliy Sachko	6	7

Final
7	(Argentina) Tomás Martín Etcheverry	7	6
(Ukraine) Vitaliy Sachko	5	2

=== Top half ===
First round
1	(Italy) S Caruso	7^{7}	6
WC	(Italy) L Vanni	6^{5}	4
(Argentina) A Collarini	6	5	1
WC	(Italy) F Forti	4	7	6
(Italy) F Baldi	3	3
(Portugal) N Borges	6	5^{r}
WC	(Italy) F Cobolli	2	7	7^{7}
6	(Kazakhstan) D Popko	6	5	6^{3}
3	(Italy) F Gaio	6	3	6^{2}
(Bulgaria) D Kuzmanov	2	6	7^{7}
(Argentina) P Cachin	4	6^{5}
Q	(Bosnia and Herzegovina) N Fatić	6	7^{7}
(Germany) Y Maden	6^{3}	1
(Switzerland) D Stricker	7^{7}	6
(Italy) A Arnaboldi	6^{3}	2
7	(Argentina) TM Etcheverry	7^{7}	6

Second round
1	(Italy) S Caruso	6	6
WC	(Italy) F Forti	4	4
(Italy) F Baldi	2	6^{3}
WC	(Italy) F Cobolli	6	7^{7}
(Bulgaria) D Kuzmanov	4	6^{5}
Q	(Bosnia and Herzegovina) N Fatić	6	7^{7}
(Switzerland) D Stricker	5	4
7	(Argentina) TM Etcheverry	7	6

Quarterfinals
1	(Italy) S Caruso	6	3	6
WC	(Italy) F Cobolli	4	6	3
Q	(Bosnia and Herzegovina) N Fatić	3	1
7	(Argentina) TM Etcheverry	6	6

Semifinals
1	(Italy) S Caruso	5	7	2
7	(Argentina) TM Etcheverry	7	5	6

=== Bottom half ===
First round
8	(Argentina) R Olivo	6^{5}	7	6
Q	(Italy) G Zeppieri	7^{7}	5	2
Q	(Kazakhstan) T Skatov	1	7^{7}	6
(Italy) L Giustino	6	6^{5}	0
(Croatia) N Serdarušić	6	6
(Italy) A Pellegrino	3	3
Q	(Italy) F Passaro	6	3	2
4	(China) Zh Zhang	3	6	6
5	(Italy) T Fabbiano	1	6	2
(Denmark) H Rune	6	4	6
(Slovakia) L Klein	6	7^{7}
(Italy) R Bonadio	1	6^{4}
(Italy) GM Moroni	2
(France) E Furness	0^{r}
(Ukraine) V Sachko	6	3	6
2	(Slovakia) A Martin	3	6	2

Second round
8	(Argentina) R Olivo	5	5
Q	(Kazakhstan) T Skatov	7	7
(Croatia) N Serdarušić	7^{8}	6
4	(China) Zh Zhang	6^{6}	4
(Denmark) H Rune	6	6
(Slovakia) L Klein	4	4
(Italy) GM Moroni	5	6	4
(Ukraine) V Sachko	7	4	6

Quarterfinals
Q	(Kazakhstan) T Skatov	7^{8}	4	4
(Croatia) N Serdarušić	6^{6}	6	6
(Denmark) H Rune	3	6^{4}
(Ukraine) V Sachko	6	7^{7}

Semifinals
(Croatia) N Serdarušić	4	5
(Ukraine) V Sachko	6	7
