= 2015 Blu-Express.com Tennis Cup – Doubles =

Doubles
- 2015 Blu-Express.com Tennis Cup

Final
- Champions: (Argentina) Andrea Collarini (Argentina) Andrés Molteni
- Runners-up: (United States) James Cerretani (Romania) Costin Pavăl
- Score: 6–3, 7–5

Events
Singles	Doubles
Blu-Express.com Tennis Cup	· 2016 →

This was the first edition of the tournament.

Andrea Collarini and Andrés Molteni won the tournament, defeating James Cerretani and Costin Pavăl in the final, 6–3, 7–5.

== Seeds ==
1. (Colombia) Nicolás Barrientos / (Peru) Sergio Galdós (quarterfinals)
2. (Chinese Taipei) Lee Hsin-han / (Italy) Alessandro Motti (quarterfinals)
3. (United States) James Cerretani / (Romania) Costin Pavăl
4. (Italy) Flavio Cipolla / (Croatia) Dino Marcan (first round)

== Draw ==
=== Key ===
- Q = Qualifier
- WC = Wild card
- LL = Lucky loser
- Alt = Alternate
- SE = Special exempt
- PR = Protected ranking
- ITF = ITF entry
- JE = Junior exempt
- w/o = Walkover
- r = Retired
- d = Defaulted
- SR = Special ranking

=== Draw ===
First round
1	(Colombia) N Barrientos (Peru) S Galdós	6	6
PR	(Spain) J Checa-Calvo (Spain) Marc Giner	4	4
(Argentina) A Collarini (Argentina) A Molteni	6^{7}	6	[10]
WC	(Italy) S Caruso (Italy) S Travaglia	7^{9}	2	[7]
4	(Italy) F Cipolla (Croatia) D Marcan	1	3
(Spain) P Carreño Busta (Spain) O Roca Batalla	6	6
(Italy) M Cecchinato (Italy) M Viola	3	6	[5]
(Peru) D Beretta (Bolivia) H Dellien	6	2	[10]
WC	(United States) Sam Barnett (United States) J Witten	1	2
(Chinese Taipei) H-y Peng (Chinese Taipei) T-h Yang	6	6
(Argentina) C Berlocq (Portugal) F Gil	1	7^{7}	[8]
3	(United States) J Cerretani (Romania) C Pavăl	6	6^{2}	[10]
WC	(Italy) G Mager (Italy) GM Moroni	2	4
(Romania) Alexandru-Daniel Carpen (Serbia) Ilija Vučić	6	6
(Chile) C Garin (Dominican Republic) J Hernández	2	7	[5]
2	(Chinese Taipei) H-h Lee (Italy) A Motti	6	5	[10]

Quarterfinals
1	(Colombia) N Barrientos (Peru) S Galdós	6	1	[7]
(Argentina) A Collarini (Argentina) A Molteni	3	6	[10]
(Spain) P Carreño Busta (Spain) O Roca Batalla	6	3	[10]
(Peru) D Beretta (Bolivia) H Dellien	0	6	[6]
(Chinese Taipei) H-y Peng (Chinese Taipei) T-h Yang	7	4	[6]
3	(United States) J Cerretani (Romania) C Pavăl	5	6	[10]
(Romania) A-D Carpen (Serbia) I Vučić	4	6	[10]
2	(Chinese Taipei) H-h Lee (Italy) A Motti	6	3	[4]

Semifinals
(Argentina) A Collarini (Argentina) A Molteni	6	6
(Spain) P Carreño Busta (Spain) O Roca Batalla	4	0
3	(United States) J Cerretani (Romania) C Pavăl	6	7
(Romania) A-D Carpen (Serbia) I Vučić	3	5

Final
(Argentina) A Collarini (Argentina) A Molteni	6	7
3	(United States) J Cerretani (Romania) C Pavăl	3	5
