= 2024 Internazionali di Tennis Città di Perugia – Doubles =

Doubles
- 2024 Internazionali di Tennis Città di Perugia

Final
- Champions: (Argentina) Guido Andreozzi (Mexico) Miguel Ángel Reyes-Varela
- Runners-up: (India) Sriram Balaji (Germany) Andre Begemann
- Score: 6–4, 7–5

Events
Singles	Doubles
← 2023 ·	Internazionali di Tennis Città di Perugia	· 2025 →

Boris Arias and Federico Zeballos were the defending champions but lost in the first round to Marcelo Demoliner and Guillermo Durán.

Guido Andreozzi and Miguel Ángel Reyes-Varela won the title after defeating Sriram Balaji and Andre Begemann 6–4, 7–5 in the final.

== Seeds ==
1. (Argentina) Guido Andreozzi / (Mexico) Miguel Ángel Reyes-Varela (champions)
2. (Bolivia) Boris Arias / (Bolivia) Federico Zeballos (first round)
3. (Venezuela) Luis David Martínez / (Colombia) Cristian Rodríguez (quarterfinals)
4. (Brazil) Fernando Romboli / (Brazil) Marcelo Zormann (semifinals, retired)

== Draw ==
=== Key ===
- Q = Qualifier
- WC = Wild card
- LL = Lucky loser
- Alt = Alternate
- SE = Special exempt
- PR = Protected ranking
- ITF = ITF entry
- JE = Junior exempt
- w/o = Walkover
- r = Retired
- d = Defaulted
- SR = Special ranking

=== Draw ===
First round
1	(Argentina) G Andreozzi (Mexico) MÁ Reyes-Varela	6	6
PR	(Dominican Republic) N Hardt (Netherlands) M Vervoort	4	4
(Argentina) F Comesaña (Argentina) M Kestelboim	3	4
(Japan) T Matsui (Japan) K Uesugi	6	6
4	(Brazil) F Romboli (Brazil) M Zormann	4	6	[10]
PR	(Zimbabwe) B Lock (Zimbabwe) CJ Lock	6	3	[7]
(Romania) A Jecan (Austria) D Pichler	6	3	[10]
WC	(Italy) Alessio De Bernardis (Italy) S Travaglia	3	6	[4]
(India) S Balaji (Germany) A Begemann	7^{7}	6
Alt	(Netherlands) J de Jong (Netherlands) Ryan Nijboer	6^{5}	3
(Italy) M Bortolotti (Australia) MC Romios	6	3	[6]
3	(Venezuela) LD Martínez (Colombia) C Rodríguez	4	6	[10]
WC	(Italy) F Cinà (Italy) F Maestrelli	6	6
(Italy) F Agamenone (Argentina) JP Paz	4	3
(Brazil) M Demoliner (Argentina) G Durán	6	7
2	(Bolivia) B Arias (Bolivia) F Zeballos	4	5

Quarterfinals
1	(Argentina) G Andreozzi (Mexico) MÁ Reyes-Varela	6	1	[14]
(Japan) T Matsui (Japan) K Uesugi	1	6	[12]
4	(Brazil) F Romboli (Brazil) M Zormann	6	6
(Romania) A Jecan (Austria) D Pichler	3	4
(India) S Balaji (Germany) A Begemann	7	6
3	(Venezuela) LD Martínez (Colombia) C Rodríguez	5	3
WC	(Italy) F Cinà (Italy) F Maestrelli	6	6
(Brazil) M Demoliner (Argentina) G Durán	2	3

Semifinals
1	(Argentina) G Andreozzi (Mexico) MÁ Reyes-Varela	4
4	(Brazil) F Romboli (Brazil) M Zormann	5^{r}
(India) S Balaji (Germany) A Begemann	6	3	[10]
WC	(Italy) F Cinà (Italy) F Maestrelli	3	6	[6]

Final
1	(Argentina) G Andreozzi (Mexico) MÁ Reyes-Varela	6	7
(India) S Balaji (Germany) A Begemann	4	5
