= 2016 Blu Panorama Airlines Tennis Cup – Singles =

Singles
- 2016 Blu Panorama Airlines Tennis Cup

Final
- Champion: (Argentina) Nicolás Kicker
- Runner-up: (Slovenia) Blaž Rola
- Score: 2–6, 6–3, 6–0

Events
Singles	Doubles
← 2015 ·	Blu Panorama Airlines Tennis Cup	· 2017 →

Pablo Carreño Busta was the defending champion but chose not to participate.

Nicolás Kicker won the title after defeating Blaž Rola 2–6, 6–3, 6–0 in the final.

== Seeds ==
1. (Brazil) Rogério Dutra Silva (quarterfinals)
2. (Spain) Roberto Carballés Baena (quarterfinals)
3. (Italy) Thomas Fabbiano (first round)
4. (Sweden) Elias Ymer (semifinals, retired)
5. (Italy) Marco Cecchinato (quarterfinals)
6. (Colombia) Santiago Giraldo (first round)
7. (Argentina) Guido Andreozzi (quarterfinals)
8. (Argentina) Nicolás Kicker (champion)

== Draw ==
=== Key ===
- Q = Qualifier
- WC = Wild card
- LL = Lucky loser
- Alt = Alternate
- SE = Special exempt
- PR = Protected ranking
- ITF = ITF entry
- JE = Junior exempt
- w/o = Walkover
- r = Retired
- d = Defaulted
- SR = Special ranking

=== Finals ===
Semifinals
(Slovenia) Blaž Rola	4	6	6
Alt	(Argentina) Juan Ignacio Londero	6	3	2
4	(Sweden) Elias Ymer	4	6^{r}
8	(Argentina) Nicolás Kicker	6	5

Final
(Slovenia) Blaž Rola	6	3	0
8	(Argentina) Nicolás Kicker	2	6	6

=== Top half ===
First round
1	(Brazil) R Dutra Silva	6	6
(Serbia) L Đere	4	3
(Italy) F Volandri	6	6^{2}	6
(Italy) A Arnaboldi	4	7^{7}	4
Q	(Germany) Y Maden	6	6
Q	(Colombia) N Barrientos	2	1
(Slovenia) B Rola	6	3	6
6	(Colombia) S Giraldo	3	6	3
3	(Italy) T Fabbiano	2	7^{8}	6^{5}
LL	(Italy) M Bortolotti	6	6^{6}	7^{7}
(Italy) S Caruso	6^{6}	4
Alt	(Argentina) JI Londero	7^{8}	6
Q	(Colombia) DE Galán	6	3	4
WC	(Italy) S Napolitano	4	6	6
(Portugal) FF Silva	2	7^{7}	4
7	(Argentina) G Andreozzi	6	6^{5}	6

Second round
1	(Brazil) R Dutra Silva	6	7^{7}
(Italy) F Volandri	2	6^{1}
Q	(Germany) Y Maden	6	5	6^{4}
(Slovenia) B Rola	2	7	7^{7}
LL	(Italy) M Bortolotti	2	3
Alt	(Argentina) JI Londero	6	6
WC	(Italy) S Napolitano	4	4
7	(Argentina) G Andreozzi	6	6

Quarterfinals
1	(Brazil) R Dutra Silva	6^{4}	2
(Slovenia) B Rola	7^{7}	6
Alt	(Argentina) JI Londero	6	6^{5}	6
7	(Argentina) G Andreozzi	3	7^{7}	4

Semifinals
(Slovenia) B Rola	4	6	6
Alt	(Argentina) JI Londero	6	3	2

=== Bottom half ===
First round
5	(Italy) M Cecchinato	6	4	6
LL	(Brazil) M Zormann	4	6	2
WC	(Italy) L Sonego	4	6	6
WC	(Italy) G Quinzi	6	3	3
(Romania) A Ungur	2	7	4
(Spain) E López-Pérez	6	5	6
(Italy) M Viola	6	5	3
4	(Sweden) E Ymer	2	7	6
8	(Argentina) N Kicker	6	6
(Italy) A Giannessi	2	0
(Chile) G Lama	6	6
WC	(Italy) A Pellegrino	1	2
(Italy) L Vanni	5	6	2
(El Salvador) M Arévalo	7	4	6
Q	(Italy) G Mager	3	1
2	(Spain) R Carballés Baena	6	6

Second round
5	(Italy) M Cecchinato	4	6	7
WC	(Italy) L Sonego	6	2	5
(Spain) E López-Pérez	5	7^{7}	3
4	(Sweden) E Ymer	7	6^{5}	6
8	(Argentina) N Kicker	6	6
(Chile) G Lama	4	3
(El Salvador) M Arévalo	6^{4}	3
2	(Spain) R Carballés Baena	7^{7}	6

Quarterfinals
5	(Italy) M Cecchinato	4	6	4
4	(Sweden) E Ymer	6	2	6
8	(Argentina) N Kicker	4	6	7
2	(Spain) R Carballés Baena	6	2	5

Semifinals
4	(Sweden) E Ymer	4	6^{r}
8	(Argentina) N Kicker	6	5
