= 2019 Internazionali di Tennis Città di Perugia – Doubles =

Doubles
- 2019 Internazionali di Tennis Città di Perugia

Final
- Champions: (Bosnia and Herzegovina) Tomislav Brkić (Croatia) Ante Pavić
- Runners-up: (Brazil) Rogério Dutra Silva (Poland) Szymon Walków
- Score: 6–4, 6–3

Events
| Singles | Doubles |
| ← 2018 · | Internazionali di Tennis Città di Perugia | · 2021 → |

Daniele Bracciali and Matteo Donati were the defending champions but chose not to defend their title.

Tomislav Brkić and Ante Pavić won the title after defeating Rogério Dutra Silva and Szymon Walków 6–4, 6–3 in the final.

== Seeds ==
1. (Monaco) Romain Arneodo / (Belarus) Andrei Vasilevski (first round)
2. (Chile) Hans Podlipnik Castillo / (Austria) Tristan-Samuel Weissborn (first round)
3. (Italy) Andrea Vavassori / (Spain) David Vega Hernández (semifinals)
4. (Bosnia and Herzegovina) Tomislav Brkić / (Croatia) Ante Pavić (champions)

== Draw ==
=== Key ===
- Q = Qualifier
- WC = Wild card
- LL = Lucky loser
- Alt = Alternate
- SE = Special exempt
- PR = Protected ranking
- ITF = ITF entry
- JE = Junior exempt
- w/o = Walkover
- r = Retired
- d = Defaulted
- SR = Special ranking

First round
1 | (Monaco) R Arneodo (Belarus) A Vasilevski | 1 | 4
(Brazil) R Dutra Silva (Poland) S Walków | 6 | 6
WC | (Italy) F Gaio (Italy) A Pellegrino | 6 | 6
(Croatia) V Galović (Italy) S Napolitano | 3 | 1
3 | (Italy) A Vavassori (Spain) D Vega Hernández | 6 | 7^{11}
(Ecuador) E Gómez (Ecuador) R Quiroz | 4 | 6^{9}
(Czech Republic) Z Kolář (Netherlands) M Vervoort | 7^{7} | 6
WC | (Italy) R Brancaccio (Italy) Pietro Rondoni | 6^{5} | 4
WC | (Italy) Alessio De Bernardis (Italy) W Trusendi | 3 | 0
Alt | (Spain) G García López (Italy) J Ocleppo | 6 | 6
ITF | (Italy) M Bortolotti (Australia) S Puodziunas | 3 | 4
4 | (Bosnia and Herzegovina) T Brkić (Croatia) A Pavić | 6 | 6
(Serbia) N Čačić (Switzerland) L Margaroli | 6 | 6
ITF | (Italy) R Bonadio (Russia) R Safiullin | 2 | 1
(Switzerland) M-A Hüsler (Venezuela) LD Martínez | 5 | 6 | [10]
2 | (Chile) H Podlipnik Castillo (Austria) T-S Weissborn | 7 | 3 | [7]

Quarterfinals
(Brazil) R Dutra Silva (Poland) S Walków | 6 | 7
WC | (Italy) F Gaio (Italy) A Pellegrino | 2 | 5
3 | (Italy) A Vavassori (Spain) D Vega Hernández | 6 | 7
(Czech Republic) Z Kolář (Netherlands) M Vervoort | 2 | 5
Alt | (Spain) G García López (Italy) J Ocleppo | 6^{4} | 2
4 | (Bosnia and Herzegovina) T Brkić (Croatia) A Pavić | 7^{7} | 6
(Serbia) N Čačić (Switzerland) L Margaroli | 7 | 4 | [13]
(Switzerland) M-A Hüsler (Venezuela) LD Martínez | 5 | 6 | [15]

Semifinals
(Brazil) R Dutra Silva (Poland) S Walków | 6 | 6
3 | (Italy) A Vavassori (Spain) D Vega Hernández | 3 | 4
4 | (Bosnia and Herzegovina) T Brkić (Croatia) A Pavić | 6 | 6
(Switzerland) M-A Hüsler (Venezuela) LD Martínez | 2 | 1

Final
(Brazil) R Dutra Silva (Poland) S Walków | 4 | 3
4 | (Bosnia and Herzegovina) T Brkić (Croatia) A Pavić | 6 | 6
