= 2022 Internazionali di Tennis Città di Perugia =

- Date: 6–12 June
- Edition: 7th
- Surface: Clay
- Location: Perugia, Italy

Champions

Singles
- (Spain) Jaume Munar

Doubles
- (France) Sadio Doumbia / (France) Fabien Reboul
| ← 2021 · | Internazionali di Tennis Città di Perugia | · 2023 → |

The 2022 Internazionali di Tennis Città di Perugia was a professional tennis tournament played on clay courts. It was the seventh edition of the tournament which was part of the 2022 ATP Challenger Tour. It took place in Perugia, Italy between 6 and 12 June 2022.

== Singles main-draw entrants ==
=== Seeds ===
| Country | Player | Rank^{1} | Seed |
|---|---|---|---|
| ESP | Carlos Taberner | 85 | 1 |
| ESP | Jaume Munar | 87 | 2 |
| ARG | Tomás Martín Etcheverry | 88 | 3 |
| ESP | Roberto Carballés Baena | 89 | 4 |
| BRA | Thiago Monteiro | 100 | 5 |
| COL | Daniel Elahi Galán | 106 | 6 |
| ITA | Gianluca Mager | 118 | 7 |
| PER | Juan Pablo Varillas | 121 | 8 |

- ^{1} Rankings are as of 23 May 2022.

=== Other entrants ===
The following players received wildcards into the singles main draw:

- (Italy) Matteo Arnaldi
- (Italy) Matteo Gigante
- (Italy) Luca Potenza

The following player received entry into the singles main draw as a special exempt:

- (Italy) Francesco Passaro

The following players received entry into the singles main draw as alternates:

- (Croatia) Borna Ćorić
- (Bosnia and Herzegovina) Nerman Fatić

The following players received entry from the qualifying draw:

- (Morocco) Elliot Benchetrit
- (Italy) Luciano Darderi
- (Germany) Maximilian Marterer
- (Italy) Giovanni Oradini
- (Colombia) Cristian Rodríguez
- (Italy) Giorgio Tabacco

The following player received entry as a lucky loser:

- (Italy) Filippo Baldi

== Champions ==
=== Singles ===
- (Spain) Jaume Munar def. (Argentina) Tomás Martín Etcheverry 6–3, 4–6, 6–1.

=== Doubles ===
- (France) Sadio Doumbia / (France) Fabien Reboul def. (Italy) Marco Bortolotti / (Spain) Sergio Martos Gornés 6–2, 6–4.
