= 2026 Internazionali di Tennis Città di Perugia – Singles =

Singles
- 2026 Internazionali di Tennis Città di Perugia

Final
- Champion: (Portugal) Henrique Rocha
- Runner-up: (Spain) Daniel Mérida
- Score: 7–6^{(7–5)}, 6–3

Events
Singles	Doubles
- Internazionali di Tennis Città di Perugia

Andrea Pellegrino was the defending champion but lost in the semifinals to Daniel Mérida.

Henrique Rocha won the title after defeating Mérida 7–6^{(7–5)}, 6–3 in the final.

At 4 hours 27 minutes, the second round match between Timofey Skatov and Tseng Chun-hsin was the longest match in Challenger history.

== Seeds ==
1. (France) Valentin Royer (second round, retired)
2. (United States) Reilly Opelka (withdrew)
3. (Spain) Daniel Mérida (final)
4. (Portugal) Henrique Rocha (champion)
5. (Spain) Pablo Llamas Ruiz (quarterfinals)
6. (Italy) Andrea Pellegrino (semifinals)
7. (Italy) Francesco Maestrelli (withdrew)
8. (Lithuania) Vilius Gaubas (first round)

== Draw ==
Key

- Q = Qualifier
- WC = Wild card
- LL = Lucky loser
- Alt = Alternate
- ITF = ITF entry
- PR = Protected ranking
- SR = Special ranking
- SE = Special exempt
- JE = Junior exempt
- JR = Junior Accelerator Programme entrant
- CO = College Accelerator Programme entrant
- NG = Next Gen Accelerator Program entrant
- w/o = Walkover
- r = Retired
- d = Defaulted

=== Finals ===
Semifinals
(Kazakhstan) Timofey Skatov	4	2
4	(Portugal) Henrique Rocha	6	6
3	(Spain) Daniel Mérida	6	5	6
6	(Italy) Andrea Pellegrino	3	7	3

Final
4	(Portugal) Henrique Rocha	7^{7}	6
3	(Spain) Daniel Mérida	6^{5}	3

=== Top half ===
First round
1	(France) V Royer	6	6
Q	(Spain) N Álvarez Varona	4	3
(Italy) M Cecchinato	6	6
Alt	I Simakin	3	4
(Tunisia) M Echargui	4	6	3
(Chinese Taipei) C-h Tseng	6	1	6
(Kazakhstan) T Skatov	4	6	6
8	(Lithuania) V Gaubas	6	4	2
4	(Portugal) H Rocha	6	7^{9}
Q	(Italy) E Dalla Valle	4	6^{7}
(Peru) G Bueno	4	1
(Serbia) D Lajović	6	6
(Italy) L Nardi	6	7^{7}
Q	(Spain) O Roca Batalla	4	6^{5}
(Switzerland) R Bertola	6	4	6
LL	(Argentina) Lucio Ratti	4	6	2

Second round
1	(France) V Royer	3	0^{r}
(Italy) M Cecchinato	6	3
(Chinese Taipei) C-h Tseng	7^{7}	6^{7}	6^{4}
(Kazakhstan) T Skatov	6^{2}	7^{9}	7^{7}
4	(Portugal) H Rocha	6	7
(Serbia) D Lajović	4	5
(Italy) L Nardi	2	6	3
(Switzerland) R Bertola	6	4	6

Quarterfinals
(Italy) M Cecchinato	4	4
(Kazakhstan) T Skatov	6	6
4	(Portugal) H Rocha	6	4	6
(Switzerland) R Bertola	2	6	2

Semifinals
(Kazakhstan) T Skatov	4	2
4	(Portugal) H Rocha	6	6

=== Bottom half ===
First round
5	(Spain) P Llamas Ruiz	6	3	7^{7}
WC	(Italy) M Ribecai	4	6	6^{2}
SE	(Romania) C Crețu	6^{4}	4
SE	(Italy) J Vasamì	7^{7}	6
(United Kingdom) L Broady	5	6	6
LL	(Spain) D Jordà Sanchis	7	3	3
(Italy) G Cadenasso	2	0^{r}
3	(Spain) D Mérida	6	0
6	(Italy) A Pellegrino	4	7^{7}	6
Q	(Poland) M Kaśnikowski	6	6^{5}	1
(Spain) R Carballés Baena	3	6	6
Q	(Italy) Lorenzo Carboni	6	1	4
WC	(Italy) Pierluigi Basile	7^{7}	4	6
(Italy) S Travaglia	6^{3}	6	3
Q	(Italy) F Forti	6	7^{7}
LL	(Netherlands) J Sels	0	6^{4}

Second round
5	(Spain) P Llamas Ruiz	7^{7}	6
SE	(Italy) J Vasamì	6^{3}	3
(United Kingdom) L Broady	4	2
3	(Spain) D Mérida	6	6
6	(Italy) A Pellegrino	4	7	6
(Spain) R Carballés Baena	6	5	3
WC	(Italy) P Basile	6	6
Q	(Italy) F Forti	1	3

Quarterfinals
5	(Spain) P Llamas Ruiz	1	2
3	(Spain) D Mérida	6	6
6	(Italy) A Pellegrino	6	6
WC	(Italy) P Basile	2	3

Semifinals
3	(Spain) D Mérida	6	5	6
6	(Italy) A Pellegrino	3	7	3
