= 2025 Internazionali di Tennis Città di Perugia – Singles =

Singles
- 2025 Internazionali di Tennis Città di Perugia

Final
- Champion: (Italy) Andrea Pellegrino
- Runner-up: (Bosnia and Herzegovina) Nerman Fatić
- Score: 6–2, 6–4

Events
Singles	Doubles
- Internazionali di Tennis Città di Perugia

Luciano Darderi was the defending champion but chose not to defend his title.

Andrea Pellegrino won the title after defeating Nerman Fatić 6–2, 6–4 in the final.

== Seeds ==
1. (Bolivia) Hugo Dellien (withdrew)
2. (Chinese Taipei) Tseng Chun-hsin (withdrew)
3. (Italy) Luca Nardi (semifinals)
4. (Serbia) Dušan Lajović (second round)
5. (Czech Republic) Dalibor Svrčina (quarterfinals)
6. (Switzerland) Stan Wawrinka (first round)
7. (Italy) Francesco Passaro (quarterfinals)
8. (Japan) Taro Daniel (second round)
9. (Italy) Andrea Pellegrino (champion)

== Draw ==
Key

- Q = Qualifier
- WC = Wild card
- LL = Lucky loser
- Alt = Alternate
- ITF = ITF entry
- PR = Protected ranking
- SR = Special ranking
- SE = Special exempt
- JE = Junior exempt
- JR = Junior Accelerator Programme entrant
- CO = College Accelerator Programme entrant
- NG = Next Gen Accelerator Program entrant
- w/o = Walkover
- r = Retired
- d = Defaulted

=== Finals ===
Semifinals
9	(Italy) Andrea Pellegrino	7^{7}	6
3	(Italy) Luca Nardi	6^{5}	2
Q	(Bosnia and Herzegovina) Nerman Fatić	6	7^{8}
Q	(Italy) Pierluigi Basile	3	6^{6}

Final
9	(Italy) Andrea Pellegrino	6	6
Q	(Bosnia and Herzegovina) Nerman Fatić	2	4

=== Top half ===
First round
9	(Italy) A Pellegrino	4	6	6
Q	(Italy) G Piraino	6	4	4
(Ukraine) V Sachko	6	3	4
Q	(Italy) F Bondioli	4	6	6
(Norway) V Durasovic	3	7^{7}	6
Q	(South Korea) G Campaña Lee	6	6^{1}	4
(Italy) F Maestrelli	3	3
7	(Italy) F Passaro	6	6
3	(Italy) L Nardi	6	6
Alt	(Georgia (country)) S Purtseladze	0	2
(Sweden) E Ymer	7	6
WC	(Italy) G Zeppieri	5	4
WC	(Italy) Lorenzo Carboni	1	3
(France) L Pavlovic	6	6
LL	(Spain) Àlex Martí Pujolràs	2	6	6^{3}
8	(Japan) T Daniel	6	4	7^{7}

Second round
9	(Italy) A Pellegrino	6	6
Q	(Italy) F Bondioli	1	4
(Norway) V Durasovic	4	2
7	(Italy) F Passaro	6	6
3	(Italy) L Nardi	6	6
(Sweden) E Ymer	2	4
(France) L Pavlovic	2	7	7^{8}
8	(Japan) T Daniel	6	5	6^{6}

Quarterfinals
9	(Italy) A Pellegrino	6	7^{7}
7	(Italy) F Passaro	4	6^{4}
3	(Italy) L Nardi	6	7
(France) L Pavlovic	3	5

Semifinals
9	(Italy) A Pellegrino	7^{7}	6
3	(Italy) L Nardi	6^{5}	2

=== Bottom half ===
First round
5	(Czech Republic) D Svrčina	6	4
(Spain) D Rincón	2	1^{r}
Alt	(Italy) S Travaglia	6	6
(Australia) B Tomic	3	1
Q	(Spain) O Roca Batalla	6	6^{5}	6^{1}
Q	(Bosnia and Herzegovina) N Fatić	2	7^{7}	7^{7}
(Japan) R Sakamoto	0	4
4	(Serbia) D Lajović	6	6
6/WC	(Switzerland) S Wawrinka	4	6^{3}
(Moldova) R Albot	6	7^{7}
Q	(Italy) Pierluigi Basile	6	6
(Spain) C Sánchez Jover	3	2
LL	(Italy) M Cecchinato	6^{6}	2
(Mexico) R Pacheco Méndez	7^{8}	6
(Italy) F Arnaboldi	4	6	6
LL	(Italy) Andrea Picchione	6	2	2

Second round
5	(Czech Republic) D Svrčina	6	6
Alt	(Italy) S Travaglia	2	3
Q	(Bosnia and Herzegovina) N Fatić	6	6
4	(Serbia) D Lajović	2	4
(Moldova) R Albot	3	6^{7}
Q	(Italy) P Basile	6	7^{9}
(Mexico) R Pacheco Méndez	2	4
(Italy) F Arnaboldi	6	6

Quarterfinals
5	(Czech Republic) D Svrčina	4	6^{6}
Q	(Bosnia and Herzegovina) N Fatić	6	7^{8}
Q	(Italy) P Basile	6	7
(Italy) F Arnaboldi	4	5

Semifinals
Q	(Bosnia and Herzegovina) N Fatić	6	7^{8}
Q	(Italy) P Basile	3	6^{6}
