= 2017 Internazionali di Tennis Città di Perugia – Singles =

Singles
- 2017 Internazionali di Tennis Città di Perugia

Final
- Champion: (Serbia) Laslo Đere
- Runner-up: (Spain) Daniel Muñoz de la Nava
- Score: 7–6^{(7–2)}, 6–4

Events
Singles	Doubles
- Internazionali di Tennis Città di Perugia

Nicolás Kicker was the defending champion but lost in the second round to Gleb Sakharov.

Laslo Đere won the title after defeating Daniel Muñoz de la Nava 7–6^{(7–2)}, 6–4 in the final.

== Seeds ==
1. (Argentina) Federico Delbonis (first round)
2. (Argentina) Nicolás Kicker (second round)
3. (Colombia) Santiago Giraldo (second round)
4. (Italy) Alessandro Giannessi (second round)
5. (Spain) Marcel Granollers (semifinals)
6. (Italy) Luca Vanni (first round)
7. (Serbia) Laslo Đere (champion)
8. (Austria) Gerald Melzer (semifinals)

== Draw ==
Key

- Q = Qualifier
- WC = Wild card
- LL = Lucky loser
- Alt = Alternate
- ITF = ITF entry
- PR = Protected ranking
- SR = Special ranking
- SE = Special exempt
- JE = Junior exempt
- JR = Junior Accelerator Programme entrant
- CO = College Accelerator Programme entrant
- NG = Next Gen Accelerator Program entrant
- w/o = Walkover
- r = Retired
- d = Defaulted

=== Finals ===
Semifinals
PR	(Spain) Daniel Muñoz de la Nava	6	6^{3}	6
8	(Austria) Gerald Melzer	2	7^{7}	4
7	(Serbia) Laslo Đere	4	7^{8}	6
5/WC	(Spain) Marcel Granollers	6	6^{6}	4

Final
PR	(Spain) Daniel Muñoz de la Nava	6^{2}	4
7	(Serbia) Laslo Đere	7^{7}	6

=== Top half ===
First round
1	(Argentina) F Delbonis	6^{7}	3
(Argentina) G Andreozzi	7^{9}	6
Alt	(France) B Bonzi	6	7^{7}
(Italy) F Gaio	1	6^{4}
PR	(Spain) D Muñoz de la Nava	6	7
WC	(Italy) GM Moroni	3	5
(Italy) S Napolitano	4	6	7^{7}
6/Alt	(Italy) L Vanni	6	4	6^{4}
3	(Colombia) S Giraldo	7^{7}	6
(France) K de Schepper	6^{5}	4
Q	(Ecuador) G Escobar	3	6^{4}
(Greece) S Tsitsipas	6	7^{7}
WC	(Italy) M Donati	4	6	6
(Spain) D Gimeno Traver	6	3	1
WC	(Italy) A Arnaboldi	1	3
8	(Austria) G Melzer	6	6

Second round
(Argentina) G Andreozzi	3	4
Alt	(France) B Bonzi	6	6
PR	(Spain) D Muñoz de la Nava	6	6
(Italy) S Napolitano	4	2
3	(Colombia) S Giraldo	4	5
(Greece) S Tsitsipas	6	7
WC	(Italy) M Donati	3	6^{3}
8	(Austria) G Melzer	6	7^{7}

Quarterfinals
Alt	(France) B Bonzi	5	4
PR	(Spain) D Muñoz de la Nava	7	6
(Greece) S Tsitsipas	4	6^{5}
8	(Austria) G Melzer	6	7^{7}

Semifinals
PR	(Spain) D Muñoz de la Nava	6	6^{3}	6
8	(Austria) G Melzer	2	7^{7}	4

=== Bottom half ===
First round
7	(Serbia) L Đere	6^{3}	6	6
(Lithuania) R Berankis	7^{7}	2	4
Q	(Tunisia) M Echargui	3	4
(Australia) M Polmans	6	6
Q	(Argentina) JP Paz	7	6^{4}	1
Alt	(Italy) S Caruso	5	7^{7}	6
(Italy) S Travaglia	3	6	5
4	(Italy) A Giannessi	6	4	7
5/WC	(Spain) M Granollers	6	7
(Spain) R Ramírez Hidalgo	3	5
(Portugal) P Sousa	6	6
(Belgium) J De Loore	4	3
(Italy) L Giustino	6^{5}	2
(France) G Sakharov	7^{7}	6
Q	(Italy) Gianluca Di Nicola	2	4
2	(Argentina) N Kicker	6	6

Second round
7	(Serbia) L Đere	3	7^{7}	6
(Australia) M Polmans	6	6^{5}	4
Alt	(Italy) S Caruso	6	6
4	(Italy) A Giannessi	3	3
5/WC	(Spain) M Granollers	6	1	6
(Portugal) P Sousa	3	6	4
(France) G Sakharov	6	6
2	(Argentina) N Kicker	3	4

Quarterfinals
7	(Serbia) L Đere	6	7
Alt	(Italy) S Caruso	2	5
5/WC	(Spain) M Granollers	7^{7}	6
(France) G Sakharov	6^{2}	3

Semifinals
7	(Serbia) L Đere	4	7^{8}	6
5/WC	(Spain) M Granollers	6	6^{6}	4
