= 2021 Internazionali di Tennis Città di Perugia =

- Date: 5–11 July
- Edition: 6th
- Surface: Clay
- Location: Perugia, Italy

Champions

Singles
- (Argentina) Tomás Martín Etcheverry

Doubles
- (Ukraine) Vitaliy Sachko / (Switzerland) Dominic Stricker
← 2019 ·	Internazionali di Tennis Città di Perugia	· 2022 →

The 2021 Internazionali di Tennis Città di Perugia was a professional tennis tournament played on clay courts. It was the sixth edition of the tournament which was part of the 2021 ATP Challenger Tour. It took place in Perugia, Italy between 5 and 11 July 2021.

== Singles main-draw entrants ==
=== Seeds ===
Country	Player	Rank^{1}	Seed
ITA	Salvatore Caruso	96	1
SVK	Andrej Martin	111	2
ITA	Federico Gaio	145	3
CHN	Zhang Zhizhen	175	4
ITA	Thomas Fabbiano	183	5
KAZ	Dmitry Popko	187	6
ARG	Tomás Martín Etcheverry	192	7
ARG	Renzo Olivo	193	8

- ^{1} Rankings are as of 28 June 2021.

=== Other entrants ===
The following players received wildcards into the singles main draw:

- (Italy) Flavio Cobolli
- (Italy) Francesco Forti
- (Italy) Luca Vanni

The following players received entry from the qualifying draw:

- (Bosnia and Herzegovina) Nerman Fatić
- (Italy) Francesco Passaro
- (Kazakhstan) Timofey Skatov
- (Italy) Giulio Zeppieri

== Champions ==
=== Singles ===
- (Argentina) Tomás Martín Etcheverry def. (Ukraine) Vitaliy Sachko 7–5, 6–2.

=== Doubles ===
- (Ukraine) Vitaliy Sachko / (Switzerland) Dominic Stricker def. (Argentina) Tomás Martín Etcheverry / (Argentina) Renzo Olivo 6–3, 5–7, [10–8].
