= 2023 Internazionali di Tennis Città di Perugia – Doubles =

Doubles
- 2023 Internazionali di Tennis Città di Perugia

Final
- Champions: (Bolivia) Boris Arias (Bolivia) Federico Zeballos
- Runners-up: (Italy) Luciano Darderi (Argentina) Juan Pablo Paz
- Score: 7–6^{(7–3)}, 7–6^{(8–6)}

Events
Singles	Doubles
← 2022 ·	Internazionali di Tennis Città di Perugia	· 2024 →

Sadio Doumbia and Fabien Reboul were the defending champions but chose not to defend their title.

Boris Arias and Federico Zeballos won the title after defeating Luciano Darderi and Juan Pablo Paz 7–6^{(7–3)}, 7–6^{(8–6)} in the final.

== Seeds ==
1. (Kazakhstan) Andrey Golubev / (Ukraine) Denys Molchanov (semifinals)
2. (Italy) Marco Bortolotti / (Spain) Sergio Martos Gornés (first round)
3. (Bolivia) Boris Arias / (Bolivia) Federico Zeballos (champions)
4. (Brazil) Fernando Romboli / (Brazil) Marcelo Zormann (first round)

== Draw ==
=== Key ===
- Q = Qualifier
- WC = Wild card
- LL = Lucky loser
- Alt = Alternate
- SE = Special exempt
- PR = Protected ranking
- ITF = ITF entry
- JE = Junior exempt
- w/o = Walkover
- r = Retired
- d = Defaulted
- SR = Special ranking

First round
1	(Kazakhstan) A Golubev (Ukraine) D Molchanov	6	6
PR	(Argentina) R Olivo (Netherlands) M Vervoort	3	2
WC	(Spain) D Marrrero (United States) Dhruva Mulye	2	1
(Italy) M Gigante (Italy) F Maestrelli	6	6
3	(Bolivia) B Arias (Bolivia) F Zeballos	6	6
(Italy) F Forti (Italy) G Zeppieri	4	4
(Italy) F Gaio (Italy) A Pellegrino	7	6
WC	(Italy) Alessio De Bernardis (Italy) F Passaro	5	2
(Italy) F Agamenone (Argentina) A Collarini	3	2
Alt	(United Kingdom) B Jones (United Kingdom) J Paris	6	6
(Spain) O Roca Batalla (Argentina) M Trungelliti	4	6	[10]
4	(Brazil) F Romboli (Brazil) M Zormann	6	3	[6]
(Italy) R Brancaccio (Italy) A Giannessi	7^{7}	4	[10]
(Romania) ND Ionel (France) A Müller	6^{4}	6	[6]
(Italy) L Darderi (Argentina) JP Paz	3	7^{7}	[12]
2	(Italy) M Bortolotti (Spain) S Martos Gornés	6	6^{2}	[10]

Quarterfinals
1	(Kazakhstan) A Golubev (Ukraine) D Molchanov	6	6
(Italy) M Gigante (Italy) F Maestrelli	2	3
3	(Bolivia) B Arias (Bolivia) F Zeballos	6	4	[10]
(Italy) F Gaio (Italy) A Pellegrino	1	6	[8]
Alt	(United Kingdom) B Jones (United Kingdom) J Paris	6^{7}	5
(Spain) O Roca Batalla (Argentina) M Trungelliti	7^{9}	7
(Italy) R Brancaccio (Italy) A Giannessi	3	4
(Italy) L Darderi (Argentina) JP Paz	6	6

Semifinals
1	(Kazakhstan) A Golubev (Ukraine) D Molchanov	4	3
3	(Bolivia) B Arias (Bolivia) F Zeballos	6	6
(Spain) O Roca Batalla (Argentina) M Trungelliti	4	7	[5]
(Italy) L Darderi (Argentina) JP Paz	6	5	[10]

Final
3	(Bolivia) B Arias (Bolivia) F Zeballos	7^{7}	7^{8}
(Italy) L Darderi (Argentina) JP Paz	6^{3}	6^{6}
