= 2016 Blu Panorama Airlines Tennis Cup =

- Date: 13–19 June
- Edition: 2nd
- Draw: 32S / 16D
- Prize money: $42,500+H
- Surface: Clay
- Location: Perugia, Italy

Champions

Singles
- (Argentina) Nicolás Kicker

Doubles
- (Brazil) Rogério Dutra Silva / (Argentina) Andrés Molteni
← 2015 ·	Blu Panorama Airlines Tennis Cup	· 2017 →

The 2016 Blu Panorama Airlines Tennis Cup was a professional tennis tournament played on clay courts. It was the second edition of the tournament which was part of the 2016 ATP Challenger Tour. It took place in Perugia, Italy between 13 and 19 June 2016.

== Singles main-draw entrants ==
=== Seeds ===
Country	Player	Rank^{1}	Seed
BRA	Rogério Dutra Silva	83	1
ESP	Roberto Carballés Baena	111	2
ITA	Thomas Fabbiano	112	3
SWE	Elias Ymer	125	4
ITA	Marco Cecchinato	127	5
COL	Santiago Giraldo	128	6
ARG	Guido Andreozzi	154	7
ARG	Nicolás Kicker	163	8

- ^{1} Rankings are as of June 6, 2016.

=== Other entrants ===
The following players received wildcards into the singles main draw:

- (Italy) Stefano Napolitano
- (Italy) Andrea Pellegrino
- (Italy) Gianluigi Quinzi
- (Italy) Lorenzo Sonego

The following player entered the main draw as an alternate:

- (Argentina) Juan Ignacio Londero

The following players received entry from the qualifying draw:

- (Colombia) Nicolás Barrientos
- (Colombia) Daniel Elahi Galán
- (Germany) Yannick Maden
- (Italy) Gianluca Mager

The following players received entry as a lucky losers:

- (Italy) Marco Bortolotti
- (Brazil) Marcelo Zormann

== Champions ==
=== Singles ===
- (Argentina) Nicolás Kicker def. (Slovenia) Blaž Rola, 2–6, 6–3, 6–0

=== Doubles ===
- (Brazil) Rogério Dutra Silva / (Argentina) Andrés Molteni def. (Colombia) Nicolás Barrientos / (Brazil) Fabrício Neis, 7–5, 6–3
