= 2017 Internazionali di Tennis Città di Perugia – Doubles =

Doubles
- 2017 Internazionali di Tennis Città di Perugia

Final
- Champions: (Italy) Salvatore Caruso (France) Jonathan Eysseric
- Runners-up: (Argentina) Nicolás Kicker (Brazil) Fabrício Neis
- Score: 6–3, 6–3

Events
Singles	Doubles
- Internazionali di Tennis Città di Perugia

Rogério Dutra Silva and Andrés Molteni were the defending champions but chose not to defend their title.

Salvatore Caruso and Jonathan Eysseric won the title after defeating Nicolás Kicker and Fabrício Neis 6–3, 6–3 in the final.

== Seeds ==
1. (Croatia) Marin Draganja / (Croatia) Tomislav Draganja (first round)
2. (Monaco) Romain Arneodo / (Italy) Riccardo Ghedin (quarterfinals)
3. (Ecuador) Gonzalo Escobar / (Netherlands) Mark Vervoort (semifinals)
4. (Brazil) Fabiano de Paula / (Croatia) Nino Serdarušić (quarterfinals)

== Draw ==
Key

- Q = Qualifier
- WC = Wild card
- LL = Lucky loser
- Alt = Alternate
- ITF = ITF entry
- PR = Protected ranking
- SR = Special ranking
- SE = Special exempt
- JE = Junior exempt
- JR = Junior Accelerator Programme entrant
- CO = College Accelerator Programme entrant
- NG = Next Gen Accelerator Program entrant
- w/o = Walkover
- r = Retired
- d = Defaulted

First round
1	(Croatia) M Draganja (Croatia) T Draganja	4	5
(France) B Bonzi (France) G Sakharov	6	7
(Italy) M Donati (Italy) S Napolitano	6	6
WC	(Italy) Gianluca Di Nicola (Italy) GM Moroni	3	3
4	(Brazil) F de Paula (Croatia) N Serdarušić	4	6	[12]
(Italy) A Motti (Italy) S Travaglia	6	4	[10]
(Argentina) N Kicker (Brazil) F Neis	6	7^{7}
(Hungary) G Borsos (Italy) L Giustino	3	6^{0}
PR	(Italy) M Berrettini (Italy) F Cipolla	6	3	[10]
(Italy) A Arnaboldi (France) K de Schepper	4	6	[2]
WC	(Lithuania) R Berankis (Bosnia and Herzegovina) T Brkić	4	3
3	(Ecuador) G Escobar (Netherlands) M Vervoort	6	6
(Italy) S Caruso (France) J Eysseric	3	7^{10}	[10]
(Australia) M Polmans (Greece) S Tsitsipas	6	6^{8}	[6]
WC	(Italy) Alessio De Bernardis (Canada) David Volfson	1	3
2	(Monaco) R Arneodo (Italy) R Ghedin	6	6

Quarterfinals
(France) B Bonzi (France) G Sakharov	7	1	[10]
(Italy) M Donati (Italy) S Napolitano	5	6	[5]
4	(Brazil) F de Paula (Croatia) N Serdarušić	3	6^{7}
(Argentina) N Kicker (Brazil) F Neis	6	7^{9}
PR	(Italy) M Berrettini (Italy) F Cipolla	6^{7}	5
3	(Ecuador) G Escobar (Netherlands) M Vervoort	7^{9}	7
(Italy) S Caruso (France) J Eysseric	6	6
2	(Monaco) R Arneodo (Italy) R Ghedin	1	3

Semifinals
(France) B Bonzi (France) G Sakharov	6	6^{6}	[3]
(Argentina) N Kicker (Brazil) F Neis	2	7^{8}	[10]
3	(Ecuador) G Escobar (Netherlands) M Vervoort	6^{1}	4
(Italy) S Caruso (France) J Eysseric	7^{7}	6

Final
(Argentina) N Kicker (Brazil) F Neis	3	3
(Italy) S Caruso (France) J Eysseric	6	6
