= 2015 Blu-Express.com Tennis Cup – Singles =

Singles
- 2015 Blu-Express.com Tennis Cup

Final
- Champion: (Spain) Pablo Carreño Busta
- Runner-up: (Italy) Matteo Viola
- Score: 6–2, 6–2

Events
Singles	Doubles
Blu-Express.com Tennis Cup	· 2016 →

This was the first edition of the tournament.

Pablo Carreño Busta won the tournament, defeating Matteo Viola in the final, 6–2, 6–2.

== Seeds ==
1. (Spain) Pablo Carreño Busta (champion)
2. (Argentina) Carlos Berlocq (first round)
3. (Italy) Marco Cecchinato (semifinals)
4. (United States) Bjorn Fratangelo (second round)
5. (Spain) Roberto Carballés Baena (quarterfinals)
6. (Dominican Republic) José Hernández (quarterfinals)
7. (Spain) Rubén Ramírez Hidalgo (quarterfinals)
8. (Italy) Roberto Marcora (second round)

== Draw ==
=== Key ===
- Q = Qualifier
- WC = Wild card
- LL = Lucky loser
- Alt = Alternate
- SE = Special exempt
- PR = Protected ranking
- ITF = ITF entry
- JE = Junior exempt
- w/o = Walkover
- r = Retired
- d = Defaulted
- SR = Special ranking

=== Finals ===
Semifinals
1	(Spain) Pablo Carreño Busta	6	7^{7}
3	(Italy) Marco Cecchinato	2	6^{5}
(Italy) Filippo Volandri	7	1	4
(Italy) Matteo Viola	5	6	6

Final
1	(Spain) Pablo Carreño Busta	6	6
(Italy) Matteo Viola	2	2

=== Top half ===
First round
1	(Spain) P Carreño Busta	6	6
WC	(Italy) S Caruso	4	3
(Colombia) N Barrientos	4	7	6^{6}
WC	(Italy) G Mager	6	5	7^{8}
Q	(Italy) L Giustino	6	2	1
(Spain) O Roca Batalla	2	6	6
Q	(Argentina) A Collarini	6	3	4
6	(Dominican Republic) J Hernández	4	6	6
3	(Italy) M Cecchinato	6	6
(Germany) N Langer	3	1
(France) Jules Marie	6	0	1
(Italy) G Naso	1	6	6
(Italy) S Travaglia	6	6
(Spain) Marc Giner	3	3
(Bolivia) H Dellien	3	4
7	(Spain) R Ramírez Hidalgo	6	6

Second round
1	(Spain) P Carreño Busta	6	6
WC	(Italy) G Mager	4	4
(Spain) O Roca Batalla	6	2	6^{6}
6	(Dominican Republic) J Hernández	4	6	7^{8}
3	(Italy) M Cecchinato	6	4
(Italy) G Naso	3	1	r
(Italy) S Travaglia	3	6	1
7	(Spain) R Ramírez Hidalgo	6	3	6

Quarterfinals
1	(Spain) P Carreño Busta	7^{7}	7
6	(Dominican Republic) J Hernández	6^{1}	5
3	(Italy) M Cecchinato	6	7^{7}
7	(Spain) R Ramírez Hidalgo	3	6^{3}

Semifinals
1	(Spain) P Carreño Busta	6	7^{7}
3	(Italy) M Cecchinato	2	6^{5}

=== Bottom half ===
First round
8	(Italy) R Marcora	3	6	6
Q	(Italy) A Virgili	6	3	2
(Italy) F Volandri	6	6
Q	(United States) J Witten	4	3
(Chinese Taipei) T-h Yang	6	3	7
(Argentina) A Molteni	3	6	5
(United States) M Krueger	6	4	3
4	(United States) B Fratangelo	3	6	6
5	(Spain) R Carballés Baena	6	6
Alt	(Slovakia) Adrian Sikora	0	3
(Bosnia and Herzegovina) T Brkić	6	6
PR	(Spain) J Checa-Calvo	3	2
WC	(Italy) F Cipolla	5	6	2
(Chile) C Garin	7	2	6
(Italy) M Viola	2	6	6
2	(Argentina) C Berlocq	6	3	2

Second round
8	(Italy) R Marcora	4	4
(Italy) F Volandri	6	6
(Chinese Taipei) T-h Yang	6	5	6
4	(United States) B Fratangelo	4	7	2
5	(Spain) R Carballés Baena	7	6
(Bosnia and Herzegovina) T Brkić	5	4
(Chile) C Garin	6	4	0
(Italy) M Viola	3	6	6

Quarterfinals
(Italy) F Volandri	6	6
(Chinese Taipei) T-h Yang	4	1
5	(Spain) R Carballés Baena	6^{12}	3
(Italy) M Viola	7^{14}	6

Semifinals
(Italy) F Volandri	7	1	4
(Italy) M Viola	5	6	6
