= 2026 Internazionali di Tennis Città di Perugia – Doubles =

Doubles
- 2026 Internazionali di Tennis Città di Perugia

Final
- Champions: (Belgium) Sander Gillé (Netherlands) Sem Verbeek
- Runners-up: (United States) Ryan Seggerman (United States) Theodore Winegar
- Score: 7–6^{(7–3)}, 4–6, [10–6]

Events
Singles	Doubles
- Internazionali di Tennis Città di Perugia

Romain Arneodo and Manuel Guinard were the defending champions but chose not to defend their title.

Sander Gillé and Sem Verbeek won the title after defeating Ryan Seggerman and Theodore Winegar 7–6^{(7–3)}, 4–6, [10–6] in the final.

== Seeds ==
1. (Belgium) Sander Gillé / (Netherlands) Sem Verbeek (champions)
2. (United States) Ryan Seggerman / (United States) Theodore Winegar (final)
3. (United States) Mac Kiger / (United States) Reese Stalder (semifinals)
4. (Colombia) Nicolás Barrientos / (Uruguay) Ariel Behar (first round)

== Draw ==
Key

- Q = Qualifier
- WC = Wild card
- LL = Lucky loser
- Alt = Alternate
- ITF = ITF entry
- PR = Protected ranking
- SR = Special ranking
- SE = Special exempt
- JE = Junior exempt
- JR = Junior Accelerator Programme entrant
- CO = College Accelerator Programme entrant
- NG = Next Gen Accelerator Program entrant
- w/o = Walkover
- r = Retired
- d = Defaulted

First round
1	(Belgium) S Gillé (Netherlands) S Verbeek	6	6
(Peru) G Bueno (Lithuania) V Gaubas	0	2
(India) A Kadhe (Brazil) M Zormann	6	6^{0}	[10]
(Bolivia) B Arias (Denmark) J Ingildsen	2	7^{7}	[7]
4	(Colombia) N Barrientos (Uruguay) A Behar	2	7	[6]
(Czech Republic) F Duda (Serbia) S Latinović	6	5	[10]
(Poland) S Kielan (Australia) M Romios	3	2
(Romania) A Jecan (Romania) B Pavel	6	6
(Thailand) P Isaro (India) N Kaliyanda Poonacha	7	6
WC	(Italy) Alessio De Bernardis (Italy) J Vasamì	5	2
Alt	(Italy) Jacopo Bilardo (Italy) Niccolò Ciavarella	6	1	[6]
3	(United States) M Kiger (United States) R Stalder	4	6	[10]
(Italy) M Cecchinato (Italy) S Travaglia	6^{2}	4
WC	(Italy) F Forti (Italy) G Ricca	7^{7}	6
(Spain) M Mansilla Díez (Spain) B Winter López	2	1
2	(United States) R Seggerman (United States) T Winegar	6	6

Quarterfinals
1	(Belgium) S Gillé (Netherlands) S Verbeek	6	6
(India) A Kadhe (Brazil) M Zormann	4	2
(Czech Republic) F Duda (Serbia) S Latinović	4	7^{7}	[10]
(Romania) A Jecan (Romania) B Pavel	6	6^{5}	[8]
(Thailand) P Isaro (India) N Kaliyanda Poonacha	4	2
3	(United States) M Kiger (United States) R Stalder	6	6
WC	(Italy) F Forti (Italy) G Ricca	4	7^{7}	[5]
2	(United States) R Seggerman (United States) T Winegar	6	6^{4}	[10]

Semifinals
1	(Belgium) S Gillé (Netherlands) S Verbeek	6	7^{7}
(Czech Republic) F Duda (Serbia) S Latinović	4	6^{3}
3	(United States) M Kiger (United States) R Stalder	6^{4}	6^{3}
2	(United States) R Seggerman (United States) T Winegar	7^{7}	7^{7}

Final
1	(Belgium) S Gillé (Netherlands) S Verbeek	7^{7}	4	[10]
2	(United States) R Seggerman (United States) T Winegar	6^{3}	6	[6]
