= 2023 Internazionali di Tennis Città di Perugia =

- Date: 12–18 June
- Edition: 8th
- Surface: Clay
- Location: Perugia, Italy

Champions

Singles
- (Hungary) Fábián Marozsán

Doubles
- (Bolivia) Boris Arias / (Bolivia) Federico Zeballos
- Internazionali di Tennis Città di Perugia

The 2023 Internazionali di Tennis Città di Perugia | G.I.Ma. Tennis Cup was a professional tennis tournament played on clay courts. It was the eighth edition of the tournament which was part of the 2023 ATP Challenger Tour. It took place in Perugia, Italy between 12 and 18 June 2023.

== Singles main-draw entrants ==
=== Seeds ===
Country	Player	Rank^{1}	Seed
ARG	Pedro Cachin	64	1
ESP	Albert Ramos Viñolas	67	2
ESP	Jaume Munar	81	3
AUT	Dominic Thiem	92	4
FRA	Alexandre Müller	101	5
~~ITA~~	~~Matteo Arnaldi~~	~~106~~	~~6~~
HUN	Fábián Marozsán	115	7
ARG	Facundo Bagnis	124	8

- ^{1} Rankings are as of 29 May 2023.

=== Other entrants ===
The following players received wildcards into the singles main draw:

- (Italy) Gianmarco Ferrari
- (Italy) Edoardo Lavagno
- (Austria) Dominic Thiem

The following players received entry from the qualifying draw:

- (Italy) Andrea Arnaboldi
- (Bosnia and Herzegovina) Nerman Fatić
- (Argentina) Renzo Olivo
- (Kazakhstan) Dmitry Popko
- (Spain) Oriol Roca Batalla
- (Italy) Alexander Weis

The following players received entry as lucky losers:

- (Spain) Álvaro López San Martín
- (Italy) Stefano Travaglia

== Champions ==
=== Singles ===
- (Hungary) Fábián Marozsán def. (Italy) Edoardo Lavagno 6–2, 6–3.

=== Doubles ===
- (Bolivia) Boris Arias / (Bolivia) Federico Zeballos def. (Italy) Luciano Darderi / (Argentina) Juan Pablo Paz 7–6^{(7–3)}, 7–6^{(8–6)}.
