= 2023 Internazionali di Tennis Città di Perugia – Singles =

Singles
- 2023 Internazionali di Tennis Città di Perugia

Final
- Champion: (Hungary) Fábián Marozsán
- Runner-up: (Italy) Edoardo Lavagno
- Score: 6–2, 6–3

Events
Singles	Doubles
- Internazionali di Tennis Città di Perugia

Jaume Munar was the defending champion but lost in the quarterfinals to Alexandre Müller.

Fábián Marozsán won the title after defeating Edoardo Lavagno 6–2, 6–3 in the final.

== Seeds ==
1. (Argentina) Pedro Cachin (semifinals)
2. (Spain) Albert Ramos Viñolas (second round)
3. (Spain) Jaume Munar (quarterfinals)
4. (Austria) Dominic Thiem (first round)
5. (France) Alexandre Müller (semifinals)
6. (Italy) Matteo Arnaldi (withdrew)
7. (Hungary) Fábián Marozsán (champion)
8. (Argentina) Facundo Bagnis (first round)

== Draw ==
Key

- Q = Qualifier
- WC = Wild card
- LL = Lucky loser
- Alt = Alternate
- ITF = ITF entry
- PR = Protected ranking
- SR = Special ranking
- SE = Special exempt
- JE = Junior exempt
- JR = Junior Accelerator Programme entrant
- CO = College Accelerator Programme entrant
- NG = Next Gen Accelerator Program entrant
- w/o = Walkover
- r = Retired
- d = Defaulted

=== Finals ===
Semifinals
1	(Argentina) Pedro Cachin	4	3
7	(Hungary) Fábián Marozsán	6	6
5	(France) Alexandre Müller	6	3	2
WC	(Italy) Edoardo Lavagno	4	6	6

Final
7	(Hungary) Fábián Marozsán	6	6
WC	(Italy) Edoardo Lavagno	2	3

=== Top half ===
First round
1	(Argentina) P Cachin	6	6
WC	(Italy) G Ferrari	4	4
Q	(Kazakhstan) D Popko	3	6	3
(Argentina) A Collarini	6	3	6
(Italy) M Gigante	6	1
(Italy) A Giannessi	3	2^{r}
(Italy) G Zeppieri	6^{4}	6	1
Q	(Bosnia and Herzegovina) N Fatić	7^{7}	2	6
4/WC	(Austria) D Thiem	6	6^{6}	1
LL	(Italy) S Travaglia	2	7^{8}	6
Q	(Argentina) R Olivo	4	5
(Italy) F Maestrelli	6	7
(Argentina) M Trungelliti	4	6	6^{6}
LL	(Spain) Á López San Martín	6	4	7^{8}
(Italy) F Agamenone	4	6^{4}
7	(Hungary) F Marozsán	6	7^{7}

Second round
1	(Argentina) P Cachin	6	3
(Argentina) A Collarini	1	1^{r}
(Italy) M Gigante	6	6^{4}	3
Q	(Bosnia and Herzegovina) N Fatić	4	7^{7}	6
LL	(Italy) S Travaglia	3	5
(Italy) F Maestrelli	6	7
LL	(Spain) Á López San Martín	2	3
7	(Hungary) F Marozsán	6	6

Quarterfinals
1	(Argentina) P Cachin	6	3
Q	(Bosnia and Herzegovina) N Fatić	3	0^{r}
(Italy) F Maestrelli	3	4
7	(Hungary) F Marozsán	6	6

Semifinals
1	(Argentina) P Cachin	4	3
7	(Hungary) F Marozsán	6	6

=== Bottom half ===
First round
5	(France) A Müller	6	3	6
(Italy) L Darderi	4	6	1
(Spain) P Martín Tiffon	6	6
(Italy) L Giustino	3	3
(Italy) A Pellegrino	7^{7}	6
(Italy) F Passaro	6^{3}	3
Q	(Italy) A Arnaboldi	0	4
3	(Spain) J Munar	6	6
8	(Argentina) F Bagnis	3	4
Q	(Spain) O Roca Batalla	6	6
WC	(Italy) Edoardo Lavagno	6	7^{7}
Q	(Italy) Alexander Weis	3	6^{4}
(Romania) ND Ionel	2	1
(Italy) R Brancaccio	6	6
(Italy) F Gaio	2	2
2	(Spain) A Ramos Viñolas	6	6

Second round
5	(France) A Müller	6	6
(Spain) P Martín Tiffon	3	1
(Italy) A Pellegrino	5	2
3	(Spain) J Munar	7	6
Q	(Spain) O Roca Batalla	7^{7}	5	5
WC	(Italy) E Lavagno	6^{2}	7	7
(Italy) R Brancaccio	5	7^{7}	6
2	(Spain) A Ramos Viñolas	7	6^{4}	2

Quarterfinals
5	(France) A Müller	5	6	6
3	(Spain) J Munar	7	4	2
WC	(Italy) E Lavagno	6	6
(Italy) R Brancaccio	2	3

Semifinals
5	(France) A Müller	6	3	2
WC	(Italy) E Lavagno	4	6	6
