= 2017 Internazionali di Tennis Città di Perugia =

- Date: 11–16 July
- Edition: 3rd
- Draw: 32S / 16D
- Surface: Clay
- Location: Perugia, Italy

Champions

Singles
- (Serbia) Laslo Đere

Doubles
- (Italy) Salvatore Caruso / (France) Jonathan Eysseric
- Internazionali di Tennis Città di Perugia

The 2017 Internazionali di Tennis Città di Perugia was a professional tennis tournament played on clay courts. It was the third edition of the tournament which was part of the 2017 ATP Challenger Tour. It took place in Perugia, Italy between 11 and 16 July 2017.

== Singles main-draw entrants ==
=== Seeds ===
Country	Player	Rank^{1}	Seed
ARG	Federico Delbonis	88	1
ARG	Nicolás Kicker	94	2
COL	Santiago Giraldo	101	3
ITA	Alessandro Giannessi	103	4
ESP	Marcel Granollers	112	5
ITA	Luca Vanni	121	6
SRB	Laslo Đere	123	7
AUT	Gerald Melzer	144	8

- ^{1} Rankings are as of 3 July 2017.

=== Other entrants ===
The following players received wildcards into the singles main draw:

- (Italy) Andrea Arnaboldi
- (Italy) Matteo Donati
- (Spain) Marcel Granollers
- (Italy) Gian Marco Moroni

The following player received entry into the singles main draw using a protected ranking:

- (Spain) Daniel Muñoz de la Nava

The following players received entry into the singles main draw as alternates:

- (France) Benjamin Bonzi
- (Italy) Salvatore Caruso
- (Italy) Luca Vanni

The following players received entry from the qualifying draw:

- (Italy) Gianluca Di Nicola
- (Tunisia) Moez Echargui
- (Ecuador) Gonzalo Escobar
- (Argentina) Juan Pablo Paz

== Champions ==
=== Singles ===
- (Serbia) Laslo Đere def. (Spain) Daniel Muñoz de la Nava 7–6^{(7–2)}, 6–4.

=== Doubles ===
- (Italy) Salvatore Caruso / (France) Jonathan Eysseric def. (Argentina) Nicolás Kicker / (Brazil) Fabrício Neis 6–3, 6–3.
