= 2015 Blu-Express.com Tennis Cup =

- Date: 15–22 June
- Edition: 1st
- Draw: 32S / 16D
- Prize money: $42,500+H
- Surface: Clay
- Location: Perugia, Italy

Champions

Singles
- (Spain) Pablo Carreño Busta

Doubles
- (Argentina) Andrea Collarini / (Argentina) Andrés Molteni
Blu-Express.com Tennis Cup	· 2016 →

The 2015 Blu-Express.com Tennis Cup was a professional tennis tournament played on clay courts. It was the 1st edition of the tournament which was part of the 2015 ATP Challenger Tour. It took place in Perugia, Italy between 15 and 22 June 2015.

== Singles main-draw entrants ==
=== Seeds ===
Country	Player	Rank^{1}	Seed
ESP	Pablo Carreno-Busta	54	1
ARG	Carlos Berlocq	110	2
ITA	Marco Cecchinato	131	3
USA	Bjorn Fratangelo	144	4
ESP	Roberto Carballés Baena	172	5
DOM	José Hernández-Fernández	191	6
ESP	Rubén Ramírez Hidalgo	194	7
ITA	Roberto Marcora	218	8

- ^{1} Rankings are as of June 8, 2015.

=== Other entrants ===
The following players received wildcards into the singles main draw:

- (Italy) Salvatore Caruso
- (Italy) Flavio Cipolla
- (Italy) Gianluca Mager
- (Italy) Stefano Travaglia

The following players used protected ranking to gain entry into the main draw:

- (Spain) José Checa Calvo

The following players entered the main draw as an alternate:

- (Slovakia) Adrian Sikora

The following players received entry from the qualifying draw:

- (Argentina) Andrea Collarini
- (Italy) Lorenzo Giustino
- (Italy) Adelchi Virgili
- (United States) Jesse Witten

== Doubles main-draw entrants ==
=== Seeds ===
Country	Player	Country	Player	Rank^{1}	Seed
GER	Gero Kretschmer	GER	Alexander Satschko	204	1
ARG	Guido Andreozzi	ARG	Guillermo Durán	233	2
ROU	Costin Pavăl	ROU	Adrian Ungur	272	3
ITA	Lee Hsin-han	ITA	Alessandro Motti	310	4

- ^{1} Rankings as of May 25, 2015.

=== Other entrants ===
The following pairs received wildcards into the doubles main draw:

- (Italy) Gianluigi Quinzi / (Italy) Stefano Travaglia
- (Italy) Alessio di Mauro / (Italy) Nicolò Schilirò
- (Italy) Salvatore Caruso / (Italy) Federico Gaio

The following pairs used protected ranking to gain entry into the doubles main draw:

- (United States) James Cerretani / (Australia) Adam Hubble

== Champions ==
=== Singles ===
- (Spain) Pablo Carreño Busta def. (Italy) Matteo Viola 6–2, 6–2

=== Doubles ===
- (Argentina) Andrea Collarini / (Argentina) Andrés Molteni def. (United States) James Cerretani / (Romania) Costin Pavăl 6–3, 7–5
