= 2019 Internazionali di Tennis Città di Perugia – Singles =

Singles
- 2019 Internazionali di Tennis Città di Perugia

Final
- Champion: (Argentina) Federico Delbonis
- Runner-up: (Spain) Guillermo García López
- Score: 6–0, 1–6, 7–6^{(7–5)}

Events
Singles	Doubles
- Internazionali di Tennis Città di Perugia

Ulises Blanch was the defending champion but chose not to defend his title.

Federico Delbonis won the title after defeating Guillermo García López 6–0, 1–6, 7–6^{(7–5)} in the final.

== Seeds ==
All seeds receive a bye into the second round.

1. (Argentina) Federico Delbonis (champion)
2. (Bosnia and Herzegovina) Damir Džumhur (second round)
3. (Spain) Albert Ramos Viñolas (semifinals)
4. (Italy) Paolo Lorenzi (third round)
5. (Portugal) Pedro Sousa (third round)
6. (Italy) Salvatore Caruso (second round)
7. (Italy) Filippo Baldi (second round, retired)
8. (Italy) Alessandro Giannessi (quarterfinals, retired)
9. (Argentina) Facundo Bagnis (third round, retired)
10. (Spain) Guillermo García López (final)
11. (Italy) Federico Gaio (quarterfinals)
12. (Argentina) Federico Coria (third round)
13. (Italy) Stefano Napolitano (third round)
14. (Slovakia) Filip Horanský (second round)
15. (Ecuador) Emilio Gómez (third round)
16. (Colombia) Daniel Elahi Galán (semifinals)

== Draw ==
Key

- Q = Qualifier
- WC = Wild card
- LL = Lucky loser
- Alt = Alternate
- ITF = ITF entry
- PR = Protected ranking
- SR = Special ranking
- SE = Special exempt
- JE = Junior exempt
- JR = Junior Accelerator Programme entrant
- CO = College Accelerator Programme entrant
- NG = Next Gen Accelerator Program entrant
- w/o = Walkover
- r = Retired
- d = Defaulted

=== Finals ===
Quarterfinals
1	(Argentina) Federico Delbonis	6	6
11	(Italy) Federico Gaio	3	4
16	(Colombia) Daniel Elahi Galán	3	6	6
(Italy) Gian Marco Moroni	6	4	3
8	(Italy) Alessandro Giannessi	2	0^{r}
3	(Spain) Albert Ramos Viñolas	6	3
10	(Spain) Guillermo García López	6	1	7^{7}
(Italy) Gianluigi Quinzi	3	6	6^{2}

Semifinals
1	(Argentina) Federico Delbonis	6	6
16	(Colombia) Daniel Elahi Galán	4	2
3	(Spain) Albert Ramos Viñolas	6	6^{5}	2
10	(Spain) Guillermo García López	4	7^{7}	6

Final
1	(Argentina) Federico Delbonis	6	1	7^{7}
10	(Spain) Guillermo García López	0	6	6^{5}

=== Top half ===
==== Section 1 ====
First round
(Portugal) G Oliveira	6^{2}	6^{1}
WC	(Italy) G Zeppieri	7^{7}	7^{7}
(Switzerland) M-A Hüsler	2	3
WC	(Italy) A Pellegrino	6	6
(France) K de Schepper	5	6	2
(Brazil) T Bellucci	7	3	6
ITF	(Italy) R Brancaccio	6^{6}	3
(Ecuador) R Quiroz	7^{8}	6

Second round
1	(Argentina) F Delbonis	1	6	6
WC	(Italy) G Zeppieri	6	3	3
WC	(Italy) A Pellegrino	3	5
15	(Ecuador) E Gómez	6	7
11	(Italy) F Gaio	6	6
(Brazil) T Bellucci	3	2
(Ecuador) R Quiroz	6	0
7	(Italy) F Baldi	4	0^{r}

Third round
1	(Argentina) F Delbonis	6	6
15	(Ecuador) E Gómez	3	3
11	(Italy) F Gaio	6	6
(Ecuador) R Quiroz	4	3

Quarterfinals
1	(Argentina) F Delbonis	6	6
11	(Italy) F Gaio	3	4

==== Section 2 ====
First round
(France) T Lamasine	7	6^{3}	7^{7}
(Colombia) S Giraldo	5	7^{7}	6^{4}
(Italy) A Arnaboldi	4	6	3
(Serbia) P Krstin	6	3	6
(Croatia) V Galović	4	4
(Brazil) R Dutra Silva	6	6
(Italy) GM Moroni	4	6	6
ITF	(Italy) Pietro Rondoni	6	1	0

Second round
4	(Italy) P Lorenzi	6	7^{9}
(France) T Lamasine	1	6^{7}
(Serbia) P Krstin	1	6^{4}
16	(Colombia) DE Galán	6	7^{7}
12	(Argentina) F Coria	6	4
(Brazil) R Dutra Silva	4	2^{r}
(Italy) GM Moroni	6	6
6	(Italy) S Caruso	1	4

Third round
4	(Italy) P Lorenzi	6^{5}	2
16	(Colombia) DE Galán	7^{7}	6
12	(Argentina) F Coria	5	6	1
(Italy) GM Moroni	7	4	6

Quarterfinals
16	(Colombia) DE Galán	3	6	6
(Italy) GM Moroni	6	4	3

=== Bottom half ===
==== Section 3 ====
First round
(Spain) M Vilella Martínez	6	5	6
(Spain) D Gimeno Traver	3	7	2
(Dominican Republic) J Hernández-Fernández	6	7^{7}
(Egypt) M Safwat	3	6^{5}
ITF	(Spain) O Roca Batalla	7^{7}	6
(Italy) L Vanni	6^{4}	2
ITF	(Italy) R Bonadio	6	6
ITF	(Russia) R Safiullin	3	2

Second round
8	(Italy) A Giannessi	6^{9}	6	6
(Spain) M Vilella Martínez	7^{11}	2	3
(Dominican Republic) J Hernández-Fernández	1	3
9	(Argentina) F Bagnis	6	6
13	(Italy) S Napolitano	6	6
ITF	(Spain) O Roca Batalla	4	0
ITF	(Italy) R Bonadio	5	7^{7}	6^{5}
3	(Spain) A Ramos Viñolas	7	6^{5}	7^{7}

Third round
8	(Italy) A Giannessi	6	6^{3}	0
9	(Argentina) F Bagnis	4	7^{7}	0^{r}
13	(Italy) S Napolitano	6	2	6^{3}
3	(Spain) A Ramos Viñolas	2	6	7^{7}

Quarterfinals
8	(Italy) A Giannessi	2	0^{r}
3	(Spain) A Ramos Viñolas	6	3

==== Section 4 ====
First round
(Czech Republic) Z Kolář	6^{5}	3
WC	(Italy) L Musetti	7^{7}	6
WC	(Bosnia and Herzegovina) A Šetkić	6	6
WC	(Italy) J Ocleppo	4	3
(Italy) G Quinzi	6^{6}	6	6
(Italy) R Marcora	7^{8}	3	3
Q	(Brazil) G Clezar	6	3	6
Q	(Russia) P Kotov	3	6	3

Second round
5	(Portugal) P Sousa	6	7
WC	(Italy) L Musetti	2	5
WC	(Bosnia and Herzegovina) A Šetkić
10	(Spain) G García López	w/o
14	(Slovakia) F Horanský	6	2	2
(Italy) G Quinzi	3	6	6
Q	(Brazil) G Clezar	6	3	6
2	(Bosnia and Herzegovina) D Džumhur	4	6	4

Third round
5	(Portugal) P Sousa	6^{3}	2
10	(Spain) G García López	7^{7}	6
(Italy) G Quinzi	6	4	7^{7}
Q	(Brazil) G Clezar	3	6	6^{3}

Quarterfinals
10	(Spain) G García López	6	1	7^{7}
(Italy) G Quinzi	3	6	6^{2}
