= 2024 Internazionali di Tennis Città di Perugia =

- Date: 10–16 June
- Edition: 9th
- Surface: Clay
- Location: Perugia, Italy

Champions

Singles
- (Italy) Luciano Darderi

Doubles
- (Argentina) Guido Andreozzi / (Mexico) Miguel Ángel Reyes-Varela
- Internazionali di Tennis Città di Perugia

The 2024 Internazionali di Tennis Città di Perugia | G.I.Ma. Tennis Cup was a professional tennis tournament played on clay courts. It was the ninth edition of the tournament which was part of the 2024 ATP Challenger Tour. It took place in Perugia, Italy between 10 and 16 June 2024.

== Singles main-draw entrants ==
=== Seeds ===
Country	Player	Rank^{1}	Seed
ITA	Luciano Darderi	40	1
SRB	Laslo Djere	52	2
CRO	Borna Ćorić	73	3
GER	Daniel Altmaier	83	4
ITA	Fabio Fognini	93	5
IND	Sumit Nagal	95	6
ARG	Francisco Comesaña	99	7
ITA	Francesco Passaro	134	8

- ^{1} Rankings are as of 27 May 2024.

=== Other entrants ===
The following players received wildcards into the singles main draw:

- (Italy) Federico Cinà
- (Italy) Luciano Darderi
- (Italy) Fabio Fognini

The following players received entry into the singles main draw as alternates:

- Egor Gerasimov
- (Poland) Maks Kaśnikowski

The following players received entry from the qualifying draw:

- (Italy) Federico Arnaboldi
- (Italy) Riccardo Bonadio
- (Italy) Giovanni Fonio
- (Italy) Alessandro Giannessi
- (Italy) Giovanni Oradini
- (Italy) Samuel Vincent Ruggeri

The following player received entry as a lucky loser:

- (Italy) Gianluca Mager

== Champions ==
=== Singles ===
- (Italy) Luciano Darderi def. (India) Sumit Nagal 6–1, 6–2.

=== Doubles ===
- (Argentina) Guido Andreozzi / (Mexico) Miguel Ángel Reyes-Varela def. (India) Sriram Balaji / (Germany) Andre Begemann 6–4, 7–5.
