= 2016 Blu Panorama Airlines Tennis Cup – Doubles =

Doubles
- 2016 Blu Panorama Airlines Tennis Cup

Final
- Champions: (Brazil) Rogério Dutra Silva (Argentina) Andrés Molteni
- Runners-up: (Colombia) Nicolás Barrientos (Brazil) Fabrício Neis
- Score: 7–5, 6–3

Events
Singles	Doubles
- Blu Panorama Airlines Tennis Cup

Andrea Collarini and Andrés Molteni were the defending champions, but only Molteni defended his title partnering Rogério Dutra Silva. Molteni successfully defended his title, defeating Nicolás Barrientos and Fabrício Neis 7–5, 6–3 in the final.

== Seeds ==
1. (Brazil) Rogério Dutra Silva / (Argentina) Andrés Molteni (champions)
2. (Colombia) Nicolás Barrientos / (Brazil) Fabrício Neis (final)
3. (Mexico) Miguel Ángel Reyes-Varela / (United States) Max Schnur (semifinals)
4. (Spain) Enrique López-Pérez / (Netherlands) Mark Vervoort (semifinals)

== Draw ==
Key

- Q = Qualifier
- WC = Wild card
- LL = Lucky loser
- Alt = Alternate
- ITF = ITF entry
- PR = Protected ranking
- SR = Special ranking
- SE = Special exempt
- JE = Junior exempt
- JR = Junior Accelerator Programme entrant
- CO = College Accelerator Programme entrant
- NG = Next Gen Accelerator Program entrant
- w/o = Walkover
- r = Retired
- d = Defaulted

First round
1	(Brazil) R Dutra Silva (Argentina) A Molteni	6	6
(Argentina) JI Londero (Portugal) FF Silva	3	3
(Italy) M Cecchinato (Slovenia) B Rola	7	4	[10]
(Italy) A Motti (Italy) M Viola	5	6	[2]
4	(Spain) E López-Pérez (Netherlands) M Vervoort	6	6
(Mexico) L Gómez (Argentina) A Schneiter	2	2
(Colombia) DE Galán (Brazil) O Luz	6	6
WC	(Italy) Manuel Ribeca (Italy) Johannes Wester-Ebbinghaus	0	2
(Turkey) T Altuna (Italy) M Bortolotti	2	2
WC	(Chile) N Jarry (Italy) G Quinzi	6	6
(Serbia) N Čačić (Portugal) G Oliveira	1	5
3	(Mexico) MÁ Reyes-Varela (United States) M Schnur	6	7
WC	(Italy) A Basso (Italy) G Mager	6^{5}	6	[7]
(Italy) S Caruso (Italy) A Giannessi	7^{7}	3	[10]
(Brazil) JP Sorgi (Brazil) M Zormann	6^{4}	3
2	(Colombia) N Barrientos (Brazil) F Neis	7^{7}	6

Quarterfinals
1	(Brazil) R Dutra Silva (Argentina) A Molteni	6	6
(Italy) M Cecchinato (Slovenia) B Rola	0	3
4	(Spain) E López-Pérez (Netherlands) M Vervoort	4	6	[10]
(Colombia) DE Galán (Brazil) O Luz	6	2	[6]
WC	(Chile) N Jarry (Italy) G Quinzi	3	6^{5}
3	(Mexico) MÁ Reyes-Varela (United States) M Schnur	6	7^{7}
(Italy) S Caruso (Italy) A Giannessi	2	6^{2}
2	(Colombia) N Barrientos (Brazil) F Neis	6	7^{7}

Semifinals
1	(Brazil) R Dutra Silva (Argentina) A Molteni	6	6
4	(Spain) E López-Pérez (Netherlands) M Vervoort	4	3
3	(Mexico) MÁ Reyes-Varela (United States) M Schnur	6^{4}	3
2	(Colombia) N Barrientos (Brazil) F Neis	7^{7}	6

Final
1	(Brazil) R Dutra Silva (Argentina) A Molteni	7	6
2	(Colombia) N Barrientos (Brazil) F Neis	5	3
