= 2021 Internazionali di Tennis Città di Perugia – Doubles =

Doubles
- 2021 Internazionali di Tennis Città di Perugia

Final
- Champions: (Ukraine) Vitaliy Sachko (Switzerland) Dominic Stricker
- Runners-up: (Argentina) Tomás Martín Etcheverry (Argentina) Renzo Olivo
- Score: 6–3, 5–7, [10–8]

Events
Singles	Doubles
- Internazionali di Tennis Città di Perugia

Tomislav Brkić and Ante Pavić were the defending champions but chose not to defend their title.

Vitaliy Sachko and Dominic Stricker won the title after defeating Tomás Martín Etcheverry and Renzo Olivo 6–3, 5–7, [10–8] in the final.

== Seeds ==
1. (Italy) Salvatore Caruso / (Italy) Federico Gaio (semifinals)
2. (Philippines) Ruben Gonzales / (United States) Hunter Johnson (first round)
3. (Netherlands) Mark Vervoort / (Bolivia) Federico Zeballos (quarterfinals, withdrew)
4. (Portugal) Nuno Borges / (Portugal) Francisco Cabral (first round, withdrew)

== Draw ==
Key

- Q = Qualifier
- WC = Wild card
- LL = Lucky loser
- Alt = Alternate
- ITF = ITF entry
- PR = Protected ranking
- SR = Special ranking
- SE = Special exempt
- JE = Junior exempt
- JR = Junior Accelerator Programme entrant
- CO = College Accelerator Programme entrant
- NG = Next Gen Accelerator Program entrant
- w/o = Walkover
- r = Retired
- d = Defaulted

First round
(Croatia) Z Babić (Germany) F Fallert	7	1	[10]
(Turkey) T Altuna (Colombia) N Barrientos	5	6	[8]
4	(Portugal) N Borges (Portugal) F Cabral
(Argentina) TM Etcheverry (Argentina) R Olivo	w/o
(France) A Cazaux (France) E Furness
WC	(Netherlands) M Hermans (Netherlands) B Stevens	w/o
(Argentina) A Collarini (Argentina) TA Tirante	3	2
(Bosnia and Herzegovina) N Fatić (Croatia) N Serdarušić	6	6
WC	(Italy) F Cobolli (Italy) F Passaro	1	6	[12]
3	(Netherlands) M Vervoort (Bolivia) F Zeballos	6	1	[14]
(Italy) R Bonadio (Italy) M Bortolotti	4	3
(Ukraine) V Sachko (Switzerland) D Stricker	6	6
WC	(Italy) Lorenzo Claverie (Italy) G Ricca	6	6
2	(Philippines) R Gonzales (United States) H Johnson	3	2

Quarterfinals
1	(Italy) S Caruso (Italy) F Gaio	3	6	[10]
(Croatia) Z Babić (Germany) F Fallert	6	2	[5]
(Argentina) TM Etcheverry (Argentina) R Olivo	6^{6}	6	[10]
WC	(Netherlands) M Hermans (Netherlands) B Stevens	7^{8}	1	[8]
(Bosnia and Herzegovina) N Fatić (Croatia) N Serdarušić	w/o
3	(Netherlands) M Vervoort (Bolivia) F Zeballos
(Ukraine) V Sachko (Switzerland) D Stricker	6	3	[13]
WC	(Italy) L Claverie (Italy) G Ricca	4	6	[11]

Semifinals
1	(Italy) S Caruso (Italy) F Gaio	3	2
(Argentina) TM Etcheverry (Argentina) R Olivo	6	6
(Bosnia and Herzegovina) N Fatić (Croatia) N Serdarušić	4	4
(Ukraine) V Sachko (Switzerland) D Stricker	6	6

Final
(Argentina) TM Etcheverry (Argentina) R Olivo	3	7	[8]
(Ukraine) V Sachko (Switzerland) D Stricker	6	5	[10]
