= 2019 Internazionali di Tennis Città di Perugia =

- Date: 8–14 July
- Edition: 5th
- Draw: 48S / 16D
- Surface: Clay
- Location: Perugia, Italy

Champions

Singles
- (Argentina) Federico Delbonis

Doubles
- (Bosnia and Herzegovina) Tomislav Brkić / (Croatia) Ante Pavić
- Internazionali di Tennis Città di Perugia

The 2019 Internazionali di Tennis Città di Perugia Sidernestor Tennis Cup was a professional tennis tournament played on clay courts. It was the fifth edition of the tournament which was part of the 2019 ATP Challenger Tour. It took place in Perugia, Italy between 8 and 14 July 2019.

== Singles main-draw entrants ==
=== Seeds ===
Country	Player	Rank^{1}	Seed
ARG	Federico Delbonis	75	1
BIH	Damir Džumhur	91	2
ESP	Albert Ramos Viñolas	99	3
ITA	Paolo Lorenzi	106	4
POR	Pedro Sousa	107	5
ITA	Salvatore Caruso	123	6
ITA	Filippo Baldi	149	7
ITA	Alessandro Giannessi	160	8
ARG	Facundo Bagnis	161	9
ESP	Guillermo García López	164	10
ITA	Federico Gaio	174	11
ARG	Federico Coria	176	12
ITA	Stefano Napolitano	177	13
SVK	Filip Horanský	181	14
ECU	Emilio Gómez	184	15
COL	Daniel Elahi Galán	194	16

- ^{1} Rankings are as of 1 July 2019.

=== Other entrants ===
The following players received wildcards into the singles main draw:

- (Italy) Lorenzo Musetti
- (Italy) Julian Ocleppo
- (Italy) Andrea Pellegrino
- (Bosnia and Herzegovina) Aldin Šetkić
- (Italy) Giulio Zeppieri

The following players received entry into the singles main draw using their ITF World Tennis Ranking:

- (Italy) Riccardo Bonadio
- (Italy) Raúl Brancaccio
- (Spain) Oriol Roca Batalla
- (Italy) Pietro Rondoni
- (Russia) Roman Safiullin

The following players received entry from the qualifying draw:

- (Brazil) Guilherme Clezar
- (Russia) Pavel Kotov

== Champions ==
=== Singles ===
- (Argentina) Federico Delbonis def. (Spain) Guillermo García López 6–0, 1–6, 7–6^{(7–5)}.

=== Doubles ===
- (Bosnia and Herzegovina) Tomislav Brkić / (Croatia) Ante Pavić def. (Brazil) Rogério Dutra Silva / (Poland) Szymon Walków 6–4, 6–3.
