= 2025 Internazionali di Tennis Città di Perugia =

- Date: 9–15 June
- Edition: 10th
- Surface: Clay
- Location: Perugia, Italy

Champions

Singles
- (Italy) Andrea Pellegrino

Doubles
- (Monaco) Romain Arneodo / (France) Manuel Guinard
- Internazionali di Tennis Città di Perugia

The 2025 Internazionali di Tennis Città di Perugia | G.I.Ma. Tennis Cup was a professional tennis tournament played on clay courts. It was the tenth edition of the tournament which was part of the 2025 ATP Challenger Tour. It took place in Perugia, Italy between 9 and 15 June 2025.

== Singles main-draw entrants ==
=== Seeds ===
Country	Player	Rank^{1}	Seed
~~BOL~~	~~Hugo Dellien~~	~~90~~	~~1~~
~~TPE~~	~~Tseng Chun-hsin~~	~~94~~	~~2~~
ITA	Luca Nardi	95	3
SRB	Dušan Lajović	125	4
CZE	Dalibor Svrčina	127	5
SUI	Stan Wawrinka	138	6
ITA	Francesco Passaro	139	7
JPN	Taro Daniel	148	8
ITA	Andrea Pellegrino	173	9

- ^{1} Rankings are as of 26 May 2025.

=== Other entrants ===
The following players received wildcards into the singles main draw:

- (Italy) Lorenzo Carboni
- (Switzerland) Stan Wawrinka
- (Italy) Giulio Zeppieri

The following players received entry into the singles main draw as alternates:

- (Georgia (country)) Saba Purtseladze
- (Italy) Stefano Travaglia

The following players received entry from the qualifying draw:

- (Italy) Pierluigi Basile
- (Italy) Federico Bondioli
- (South Korea) Gerard Campaña Lee
- (Bosnia and Herzegovina) Nerman Fatić
- (Italy) Gabriele Piraino
- (Spain) Oriol Roca Batalla

The following players received entry as lucky losers:

- (Italy) Marco Cecchinato
- (Spain) Àlex Martí Pujolràs
- (Italy) Andrea Picchione

== Champions ==
=== Singles ===
- (Italy) Andrea Pellegrino def. (Bosnia and Herzegovina) Nerman Fatić 6–2, 6–4.

=== Doubles ===
- (Monaco) Romain Arneodo / (France) Manuel Guinard def. (Netherlands) Robin Haase / (United States) Vasil Kirkov 3–6, 6–3, [10–5].
