= 2026 Internazionali di Tennis Città di Perugia =

- Date: 1–7 June
- Edition: 11th
- Surface: Clay
- Location: Perugia, Italy

Champions

Singles
- (Portugal) Henrique Rocha

Doubles
- (Belgium) Sander Gillé / (Netherlands) Sem Verbeek
- Internazionali di Tennis Città di Perugia

The 2026 Internazionali di Tennis Città di Perugia was a professional tennis tournament played on clay courts. It was the 11th edition of the tournament which was part of the 2026 ATP Challenger Tour. It took place in Perugia, Italy between 1 and 7 June 2026.

== Singles main-draw entrants ==
=== Seeds ===
Country	Player	Rank^{1}	Seed
FRA	Valentin Royer	74	1
~~USA~~	~~Reilly Opelka~~	~~76~~	~~2~~
ESP	Daniel Mérida	86	3
POR	Henrique Rocha	119	4
ESP	Pablo Llamas Ruiz	122	5
ITA	Andrea Pellegrino	124	6
~~ITA~~	~~Francesco Maestrelli~~	~~128~~	~~7~~
LTU	Vilius Gaubas	133	8

- ^{1} Rankings are as of 25 May 2026.

=== Other entrants ===
The following players received wildcards into the singles main draw:

- (Italy) Pierluigi Basile
- (United States) ~~Reilly Opelka~~
- (Italy) Michele Ribecai

The following players received entry into the singles main draw as special exempts:

- (Romania) Cezar Crețu
- (Italy) Jacopo Vasamì

The following player received entry into the singles main draw as an alternate:

- Ilia Simakin

The following players received entry from the qualifying draw:

- (Spain) Nicolás Álvarez Varona
- (Italy) Lorenzo Carboni
- (Italy) Enrico Dalla Valle
- (Italy) Francesco Forti
- (Poland) Maks Kaśnikowski
- (Spain) Oriol Roca Batalla

The following players received entry as lucky losers:

- (Spain) David Jordà Sanchis
- (Argentina) Lucio Ratti
- (Netherlands) Jelle Sels

== Champions ==
=== Singles ===
- (Portugal) Henrique Rocha def. (Spain) Daniel Mérida 7–6^{(7–5)}, 6–3.

=== Doubles ===
- (Belgium) Sander Gillé / (Netherlands) Sem Verbeek def. (United States) Ryan Seggerman / (United States) Theodore Winegar 7–6^{(7–3)}, 4–6, [10–6].
