= Juan Pablo Paz (tennis) =

Argentine tennis player and content creator

- Country (sports): Argentina
- Born: 4 January 1995 (age 31) Berazategui, Argentina
- Height: 1.73 m (5 ft 8 in)
- Plays: Right-handed (two-handed backhand)
- Prize money: $209,206

Singles
- Career record: 0–0 (at ATP Tour level, Grand Slam level, and in Davis Cup)
- Career titles: 0
- Highest ranking: No. 284 (8 May 2017)
- Current ranking: No. 983 (27 October 2025)

Doubles
- Career record: 1–1 (at ATP Tour level, Grand Slam level, and in Davis Cup)
- Career titles: 0
- Highest ranking: No. 231 (6 May 2024)
- Current ranking: No. 860 (27 October 2025)
- Last updated on: 27 October 2025.

Juan Pablo Paz (Latin American Spanish: [ˈxwam ˈpaβlo ˈpas]; (Note: In isolation, Juan is pronounced [ˈxwan].) born 4 January 1995) is an Argentine tennis player. Paz has a career-high ATP singles ranking of No. 284 achieved on 8 May 2017 and a career-high ATP doubles ranking of No. 231 achieved on 6 May 2024.

Paz made his ATP main draw debut at the 2017 Ecuador Open Quito in the doubles draw partnering Gonzalo Escobar.

== ATP Challenger and ITF Futures/World Tennis Tour finals ==
=== Singles: 26 (8–18) ===
Legend ATP Challengers (0–0) ITF Futures/World Tennis Tour (8–18)	Titles by surface Hard (0–0) Clay (8–18) Grass (0–0)

Result	W–L	Date	Tournament	Tier	Surface	Opponent	Score
Win	1–0	Mar 2014	Argentina F5, Rosario	Futures	Clay	(Argentina) Pedro Cachin	6–3, 6–4
Win	2–0	Mar 2014	Argentina F6, Olavarría	Futures	Clay	(Argentina) Maximiliano Estévez	6–4, 6–1
Loss	2–1	Aug 2014	Argentina F15, La Rioja	Futures	Clay	(Argentina) Nicolás Kicker	6–7^{(4–7)}, 5–7
Win	3–1	Jul 2015	Serbia F4, Belgrade	Futures	Clay	(Chile) Guillermo Rivera Aránguiz	6–2, 7–5
Loss	3–2	Sep 2015	Argentina F13, La Rioja	Futures	Clay	(Argentina) Maximiliano Estévez	1–6, 6–7^{(1–7)}
Loss	3–3	Oct 2015	Argentina F14, San Juan	Futures	Clay	(Italy) Francisco Bahamonde	3–6, 6–7^{(4–7)}
Win	4–3	Nov 2015	Peru F4, Lima	Futures	Clay	(Ecuador) Iván Endara	6–2, 4–1, ret.
Win	5–3	May 2016	Romania F2, Galati	Futures	Clay	(Lithuania) Laurynas Grigelis	6–4, 6–1
Loss	5–4	May 2016	Romania F4, Bacău	Futures	Clay	(Romania) Dragoș Dima	4–6, 6–4, 2–6
Loss	5–5	Jul 2016	Italy F19, Naples	Futures	Clay	(Chile) Cristian Garín	2–6, 0–6
Loss	5–6	May 2018	Bosnia & Herzegovina F2, Brčko	Futures	Clay	(Germany) Elmar Ejupovic	6–7^{(1–7)}, 1–6
Loss	5–7	Jul 2018	Italy F16, Gaeta	Futures	Clay	(Italy) Domenico Cutuli	1–6, 4–6
Loss	5–8	Jul 2018	Morocco F1, Khemisset	Futures	Clay	(Morocco) Lamine Ouahab	6–2, 0–6, 1–6
Win	6–8	Feb 2020	M15 Cairo, Egypt	World Tennis Tour	Clay	(Russia) Evgenii Tiurnev	6–3, 7–6^{(8–6)}
Loss	6–9	Feb 2020	M15 Antalya, Turkey	World Tennis Tour	Clay	(Italy) Riccardo Bonadio	6–3, 4–6, 1–6
Loss	6–10	Jan 2021	M15 Cairo, Egypt	World Tennis Tour	Clay	(Spain) Carlos Sánchez Jover	3–6, 0–6
Loss	6–11	Sep 2021	M15 Ulcinj, Montenegro	World Tennis Tour	Clay	(Hungary) Gergely Madarász	6–4, 1–6, 3–6
Win	7–11	Nov 2021	M15 Antalya, Turkey	World Tennis Tour	Clay	(Russia) Andrey Chepelev	6–2, 1–6, 6–0
Loss	7–12	Dec 2021	M25 Villa Allende, Argentina	World Tennis Tour	Clay	(Argentina) Francisco Comesaña	6–7^{(4–7)}, 6–7^{(5–7)}
Loss	7–13	Jul 2022	M15 Litija, Slovenia	World Tennis Tour	Clay	(Ukraine) Oleksandr Ovcharenko	1–6, 7–6^{(8–6)}, 3–6
Loss	7–14	Aug 2022	M25 Pitești, Romania	World Tennis Tour	Clay	(Romania) Nicholas David Ionel	3–6, 6–3, 4–6
Loss	7–15	Aug 2022	M15 Curtea de Argeș, Romania	World Tennis Tour	Clay	(Argentina) Valerio Aboian	3–6, 3–6
Loss	7–16	Aug 2023	M15 Bucharest, Romania	World Tennis Tour	Clay	(Romania) Bogdan Pavel	5–7, 4–6
Loss	7–17	Sep 2023	M15 Constanta, Romania	World Tennis Tour	Clay	(Romania) Cezar Cretu	6–3, 5–7, 1–6
Loss	7–18	Aug 2024	M15 Kursumlijska Banja, Serbia	World Tennis Tour	Clay	(Italy) Tommaso Compagnucci	1–6, 2–6
Win	8–18	Oct 2024	M15 Tsaghkadzor, Armenia	World Tennis Tour	Clay	(Hungary) Gergely Madarász	6–3, 6–4

=== Doubles: 41 (23–18) ===
Legend ATP Challengers (0–2) ITF Futures/World Tennis Tour (23–16)	Titles by surface Hard (0–0) Clay (23–18) Grass (0–0)

Result	W–L	Date	Tournament	Tier	Surface	Partner	Opponents	Score
Loss	0–1	Oct 2013	Chile F6, Santiago	Futures	Clay	(Colombia) Juan Manuel Benítez	(Chile) Juan Carlos Sáez (Chile) Ricardo Urzúa Rivera	5–7, 2–6
Loss	0–2	Aug 2014	Argentina F15, La Rioja	Futures	Clay	(Argentina) Dante Gennaro	(Argentina) Juan Ignacio Galarza (Argentina) Joaquin-Jesus Monteferrario	3–6, 6–7^{(5–7)}
Win	1–2	Sep 2014	Argentina F18, Buenos Aires	Futures	Clay	(Argentina) Juan Ignacio Galarza	(Argentina) Hernán Casanova (Argentina) Eduardo Agustín Torre	7–6^{(7–4)}, 6–3
Win	2–2	Nov 2014	Chile F8, Temuco	Futures	Clay	(Argentina) Leandro Portmann	(Argentina) Eduardo Agustín Torre (Argentina) Gonzalo Villanueva	7–5, 6–3
Loss	2–3	May 2015	Argentina F5, Córdoba	Futures	Clay	(Argentina) Mauricio Pérez Mota	(Argentina) Nicolás Kicker (Argentina) Matias Zukas	0–6, 3–6
Loss	2–4	Aug 2015	Argentina F10, Misiones	Futures	Clay	(Argentina) Dante Gennaro	(Brazil) Oscar José Gutierrez (Argentina) Gabriel Alejandro Hidalgo	3–6, 4–6
Win	3–4	Mar 2016	Argentina F4, Olavarría	Futures	Clay	(Italy) Franco Agamenone	(Brazil) Oscar José Gutierrez (Argentina) Gabriel Alejandro Hidalgo	2–6, 6–3, [10–7]
Win	4–4	May 2016	Romania F2, Galati	Futures	Clay	(Mexico) Lucas Gómez	(Lithuania) Laurynas Grigelis (Lithuania) Lukas Mugevičius	6–4, 4–6, [11–9]
Win	5–4	Jun 2016	Romania F7, Bucharest	Futures	Clay	(Ukraine) Vladyslav Manafov	(Argentina) Mariano Kestelboim (Romania) Petru-Alexandru Luncanu	4–6, 7–5, [10–4]
Loss	5–5	Jul 2016	Italy F19, Naples	Futures	Clay	(Brazil) Eduardo Dischinger	(Italy) Filippo Baldi (Italy) Andrea Pellegrino	7–5, 5–7, [2–10]
Loss	5–6	Dec 2016	Chile F8, Santiago	Futures	Clay	(Chile) Carlos José Cuevas	(Chile) Nicolás Jarry (Chile) Guillermo Núñez	3–6, 5–7
Loss	5–7	Mar 2017	Italy F5, Santa Margherita di Pula	Futures	Clay	(Romania) Dragoș Dima	(Italy) Andrea Basso (Croatia) Viktor Galović	4–6, 4–6
Loss	5–8	Apr 2017	Italy F6, Santa Margherita di Pula	Futures	Clay	(Argentina) Andrea Collarini	(Poland) Mateusz Kowalczyk (Poland) Grzegorz Panfil	1–6, 6–7^{(5–7)}
Loss	5–9	May 2017	Shymkent, Kazakhstan	Challenger	Clay	(Belgium) Clément Geens	(Chile) Hans Podlipnik Castillo (Belarus) Andrei Vasilevski	4–6, 2–6
Win	6–9	Nov 2017	Argentina F8, Corrientes	Futures	Clay	(Argentina) Tomás Lipovšek Puches	(Argentina) Valentín Flórez (Argentina) Eduardo Agustín Torre	7–5, 2–6, [10–8]
Loss	6–10	Apr 2018	Turkey F13, Antalya	Futures	Clay	(Argentina) Sebastián Báez	(Czech Republic) Vít Kopřiva (Czech Republic) Jaroslav Pospíšil	2–6, 0–6
Win	7–10	Jul 2018	Morocco F1, Khemisset	Futures	Clay	(Argentina) Tomás Lipovšek Puches	(Spain) Fernando Bogajo (Peru) Mauricio Echazú	6–2, 7–5
Win	8–10	Oct 2018	Turkey F30, Antalya	Futures	Clay	(Belgium) Jeroen Vanneste	(Turkey) Cengiz Aksu (Turkey) Mert Naci Türker	7–6^{(7–4)}, 6–2
Win	9–10	Nov 2018	Chile F2, Santiago	Futures	Clay	(Argentina) Santiago Rodríguez Taverna	(Argentina) Tomás Martín Etcheverry (Argentina) Matias Zukas	6–4, 6–4
Win	10–10	Jan 2020	M15 Cairo, Egypt	World Tennis Tour	Clay	(Argentina) Fermín Tenti	(Russia) Alexander Shevchenko (Ukraine) Eric Vanshelboim	6–0, 6–1
Win	11–10	Nov 2020	M15 Cairo, Egypt	World Tennis Tour	Clay	(Argentina) Juan Bautista Otegui	(Switzerland) Johan Nikles (Spain) Carlos Sánchez Jover	6–2, 7–5
Win	12–10	Dec 2020	M15 Cairo, Egypt	World Tennis Tour	Clay	(Argentina) Juan Bautista Otegui	(Lebanon) Hady Habib (Spain) Jose Francisco Vidal Azorín	6–4, 6–4
Win	13–10	Mar 2021	M15 Antalya, Turkey	World Tennis Tour	Clay	(Ukraine) Oleksii Krutykh	(Germany) Peter Heller (Belgium) Jeroen Vanneste	7–5, 4–6, [10–7]
Loss	13–11	Apr 2021	M15 Cairo, Egypt	World Tennis Tour	Clay	(Argentina) Juan Ignacio Galarza	(Kazakhstan) Grigoriy Lomakin (Germany) Kai Wehnelt	4–6, 2–6
Win	14–11	May 2021	M15 Cairo, Egypt	World Tennis Tour	Clay	(Argentina) Juan Ignacio Galarza	(Argentina) Alex Barrena (Argentina) Santiago de la Fuente	6–3, 6–1
Loss	14–12	May 2021	M15 Troisdorf, Germany	World Tennis Tour	Clay	(Argentina) Juan Ignacio Galarza	(France) Dan Added (United Kingdom) Luke Johnson	4–6, 4–6
Win	15–12	May 2021	M15 Bucharest, Romania	World Tennis Tour	Clay	(Argentina) Juan Ignacio Galarza	(Romania) Vlad Andrei Dancu (Romania) Vladimir Filip	6–2, 6–3
Loss	15–13	Jun 2021	M15 Genoa, Italy	World Tennis Tour	Clay	(Argentina) Juan Ignacio Galarza	(Switzerland) Rémy Bertola (Italy) Giorgio Ricca	3–6, 5–7
Win	16–13	Sep 2021	M15 Ulcinj, Montenegro	World Tennis Tour	Clay	(Ukraine) Eric Vanshelboim	(Bulgaria) Gabriel Donev (Bulgaria) Simon Anthony Ivanov	6–3, 6–3
Loss	16–14	Oct 2021	M15 Antalya, Turkey	World Tennis Tour	Clay	(Argentina) Santiago de la Fuente	(Hungary) Gergely Madarász (Hungary) Péter Nagy	2–6, 4–6
Loss	16–15	Oct 2021	M15 Antalya, Turkey	World Tennis Tour	Clay	(Hungary) Péter Nagy	(Germany) Timo Stodder (Switzerland) Damien Wenger	1–6, 2–6
Loss	16–16	Apr 2023	M15 Antalya, Turkey	World Tennis Tour	Clay	(Argentina) Fermin Tenti	(Germany) Peter Heller (Germany) Johannes Härteis	4–6, 6–7^{(7–9)}
Win	17–16	May 2023	M15 Kursumlijska Banja, Serbia	World Tennis Tour	Clay	(Ukraine) Oleksandr Ovcharenko	(Montenegro) Rrezart Cungu (Lebanon) Hady Habib	7–6^{(7–5)}, 6–4
Win	18–16	May 2023	M15 Bucharest, Romania	World Tennis Tour	Clay	(Belgium) Simon Beaupain	(Israel) Lior Goldenberg (Israel) Yshai Oliel	6–4, 6–2
Loss	18–17	Jun 2023	Perugia, Italy	Challenger	Clay	(Italy) Luciano Darderi	(Bolivia) Boris Arias (Bolivia) Federico Zeballos	6–7^{(3–7)}, 6–7^{(6–8)}
Win	19–17	Jul 2023	M25 Bacau, Romania	World Tennis Tour	Clay	(Argentina) Hernan Casanova	(Romania) Marius Copil (Romania) Bogdan Pavel	7–6^{(7–4)}, 6–7^{(4–7)}, [10–8]
Win	20–17	Aug 2023	M25 Bucharest, Romania	World Tennis Tour	Clay	(Romania) Ioan Alexandru Chirita	(Romania) Vlad Cristian Breazu (Romania) Gheorghe Claudiu Schinteie	2–6, 6–3, [10–7]
Win	21–17	Dec 2023	M15 Concepción, Chile	World Tennis Tour	Clay	(Argentina) Gonzalo Villanueva	(Brazil) João Victor Couto Loureiro (Argentina) Lautaro Midón	6–1, 6–3
Win	22–17	Dec 2023	M15 Concepción, Chile	World Tennis Tour	Clay	(Argentina) Gonzalo Villanueva	(Brazil) Luís Britto (Brazil) Paulo Andre Saraiva dos Santos	6–4, 5–7, [10–5]
Win	23–17	Feb 2024	M25 Antalya, Turkey	World Tennis Tour	Clay	(Argentina) Alejo Lorenzo Lingua Lavallén	(Dominican Republic) Nick Hardt (Brazil) Gabriel Roveri Sidney	7–5, 6–4
Loss	23–18	Apr 2024	M15 Antalya, Turkey	World Tennis Tour	Clay	(United Kingdom) Felix Mischker	(Czech Republic) Jiri Barnat (Slovakia) Tomáš Lánik	6–7^{(5–7)}, 2–6
