= Luciano Darderi =

Italian tennis player (born 2002)

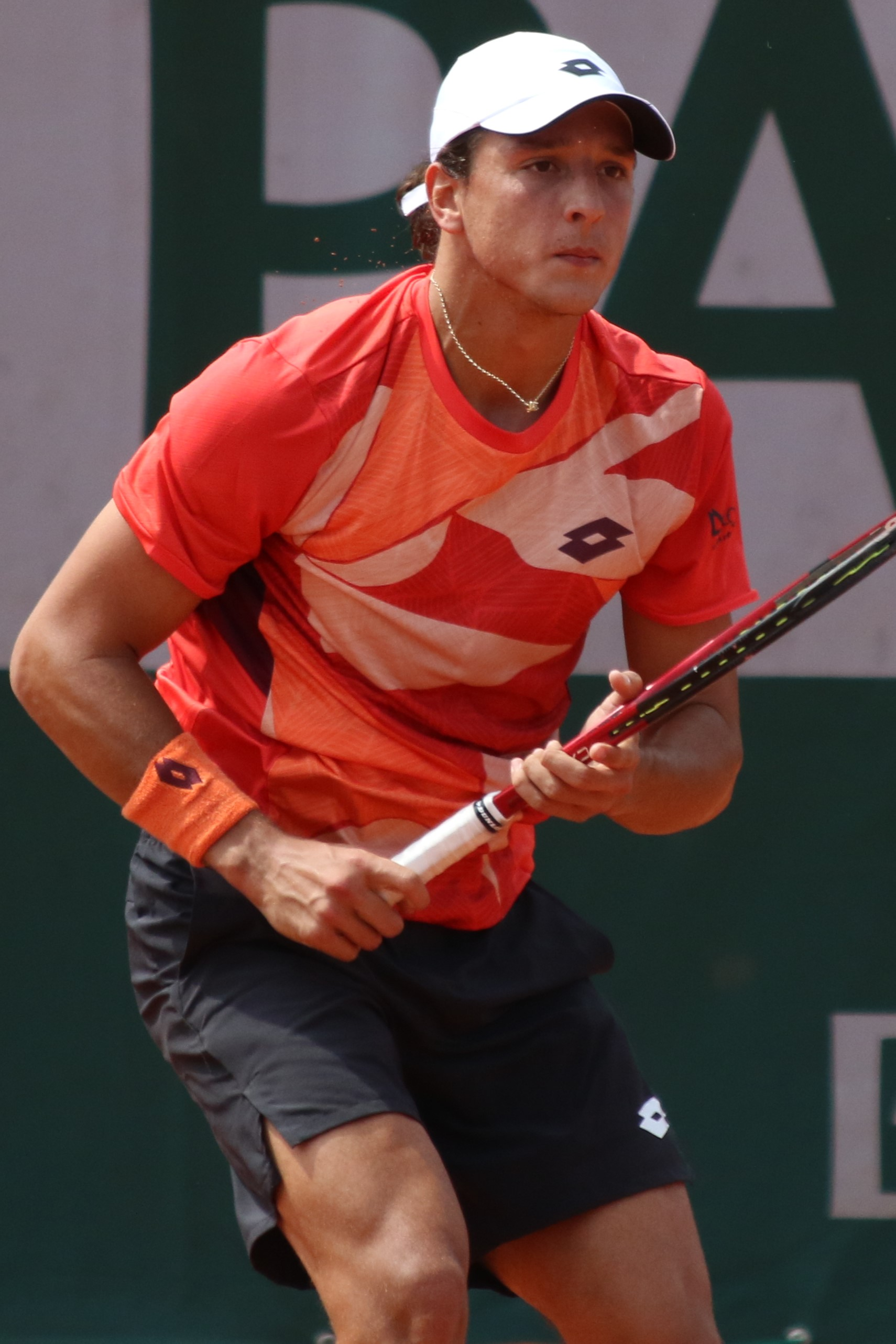
- Darderi at the 2023 French Open
- Country (sports): Italy
- Born: 14 February 2002 (age 24) Villa Gesell, Argentina
- Height: 1.83 m (6 ft 0 in)
- Turned pro: 2023
- Plays: Right-handed (two-handed backhand)
- Coach: Luciano Enrique (Gino) Darderi
- Prize money: US $6,130,515

Singles
- Career record: 72–66
- Career titles: 5
- Highest ranking: No. 16 (18 May 2026)
- Current ranking: No. 21 (9 November 2026)

Grand Slam singles results
- Australian Open: 4R (2026)
- French Open: 2R (2024, 2026)
- Wimbledon: 3R (2025)
- US Open: 4R (2026)

Other tournaments
- Olympic Games: 1R (2024)

Doubles
- Career record: 14–38
- Career titles: 0
- Highest ranking: No. 104 (8 August 2022)
- Current ranking: No. 178 (18 May 2026)

Grand Slam doubles results
- Australian Open: 2R (2025)
- French Open: 1R (2024, 2025)
- Wimbledon: 1R (2024)
- US Open: 1R (2024, 2026)

Other doubles tournaments
- Olympic Games: 1R (2024)
- Last updated on: 18 May 2026.

Luciano Tadeo Darderi (born 14 February 2002) is an Italian professional tennis player born in Argentina. He has a career-high ATP singles ranking of world No. 16 achieved on 18 May 2026 and a career-high doubles ranking of No. 104 reached on 8 August 2022. He is currently the No. 4 singles player from Italy. Darderi has won five ATP Tour singles titles, all of them on clay. He represented Italy at the 2024 Summer Olympics in Paris.

== Career ==
=== 2020: Juniors ===
In February 2020, Darderi won the doubles category at the prestigious Banana Bowl, with local player Gustavo Heide. He had good results in Juniors, maintaining a 62–25 singles win-loss record and reached an ITF junior combined ranking of world No. 8 on 17 February 2020.

=== 2021: First ATP Challenger singles final ===
Darderi won his maiden ATP Challenger title at the 2021 Challenger de Buenos Aires in doubles partnering with Juan Bautista Torres. Darderi reached his first singles ATP Challenger Tour final at the 2021 São Paulo Challenger de Tênis as a qualifier.

=== 2023: ATP debut, Challenger title ===
Darderi made his ATP debut at the 2023 Córdoba Open as a qualifier where he recorded his first ATP win against Hugo Gaston. He entered the main draw of the 2023 Mexican Open as a lucky loser following the withdrawal of top seed Carlos Alcaraz. In August, he won his first Challenger title in Todi. He won his second Challenger title in Lima. As a result he made his top 125 debut on 13 November 2023.

=== 2024: ATP title, ATP 1000 debut, top 50 ===
Ranked No. 136, Darderi qualified for the main draw and recorded his next five ATP wins at the 2024 Córdoba Open. He defeated Tomás Barrios Vera and stunned fourth seed Sebastian Ofner and seventh seed Yannick Hanfmann to reach his first ATP semifinal. Next he defeated defending champion and second seed Sebastián Báez, his first top 30 win, to reach his first ATP career final where he faced fellow qualifier Facundo Bagnis and won the title in straight sets. It was the third time since the inception of the ATP Tour in 1990 that two qualifiers met in an ATP 250 tournament final, after 2015 Sydney and 2018 Kitzbuhel. As a result he moved up 60 positions and reached the top 80 in the rankings on 12 February 2024. He entered the next Golden swing tournament, the 2024 Argentina Open with a special exempt (SE) status. For the next tournament, the 2024 Chile Open, he received a wildcard where he also reached the quarterfinals defeating again two Argentines, Facundo Bagnis and this time qualifier Juan Manuel Cerúndolo.

Darderi made his Masters debut at the 2024 Miami Open where he lost to Denis Shapovalov. Following a second career semifinal showing at the 2024 U.S. Men's Clay Court Championships he reached the top 65 in the singles rankings on 8 April 2024, where he defeated en route local wildcard Denis Kudla and two seeds, second seed Francisco Cerúndolo and seventh seed Marcos Giron.

Following his home tournament in Rome where he reached the third round of a Masters for the first time with wins over Denis Shapovalov and 31st seed Mariano Navone, before losing to fifth seed and eventual champion Alexander Zverev, he also reached the semifinals of the next home tournament in Turin as a wildcard, losing to top seed Lorenzo Musetti. As a result he reached the top 50 at world No. 47 on 20 May 2024. By reaching his second ATP semifinal of the season at the 2024 ATP Lyon Open after a walkover from Arthur Rinderknech, he entered the top 40 in the rankings the following week.

=== 2025: Three more ATP titles, top 30 ===
In April, Darderi won his second ATP Tour title at the Grand Prix Hassan II, defeating Tallon Griekspoor in the final.

In July, he won his third title on the ATP Tour at the Swedish Open, defeating second seed Francisco Cerundolo in the semifinal and Jesper de Jong in the final. The following week, Darderi won his fourth title at the Croatia Open Umag, defeating Carlos Taberner in the final.

=== 2026: Top 10 win, Italian Open semifinal, top 20 ===
Darderi claimed his fifth ATP title in March at the Chile Open, defeating Yannick Hanfmann in straight sets.

Darderi reached the quarterfinals of an ATP Masters 1000 for the first time at his home tournament in Rome, saving four match points against second seed Alexander Zverev, and recording his first Top 10 win. Next he defeated 32nd seed Rafael Jodar in a three-set match over three hours, to reach the semifinals. He became the eighth Italian to reach the last four at the event in the Open Era.

== Early life ==
Luciano Darderi was born in Villa Gesell, Argentina, into a family of Italian descent. He is the son of former tennis player Gino who worked in Italy as a tennis coach and instructor and later became Luciano's coach as well. His paternal grandfather was originally from Fano, in the Marche region of Italy, located about 300 km from Rome, and emigrated to Argentina after World War II at the age of 22. Darderi has dual Argentine and Italian citizenship thanks to the citizenship of his Italian grandfather.

He picked up a racket for the first time at two years old and took his first lessons at five. From the age of 10, Darderi regularly traveled between Argentina and Italy before eventually moving permanently to Italy to pursue his tennis career. He lived for several years in Rome and with the support of the Italian Tennis and Padel Federation, he began training in Arezzo and Rome.

His brother, Vito Antonio, born in 2008, also plays tennis and was the Italian under-12 champion. He has spoken about his strong bond with his family, especially his grandmother, who bought him his first tennis rackets and inspired the only tattoo he has.

Darderi has said that one of his biggest dreams is to win the Italian Open in Rome and represent Italy in the Davis Cup.

=== Singles ===
Tournament	2020	2021	2022	2023	2024	2025	2026	SR	W–L	Win %
Grand Slam tournaments
Australian Open	A	A	A	Q3	Q1	1R	4R	0 / 2	3–2	60%
French Open	A	A	A	Q1	2R	1R	2R	0 / 3	2–3	40%
Wimbledon	NH	A	A	Q1	2R	3R	1R	0 / 3	3–3	50%
US Open	A	A	Q1	A	1R	3R	4R	0 / 3	5–3	63%
Win–loss	0–0	0–0	0–0	0–0	2–3	4–4	7–4	0 / 11	13–11	54%
ATP 1000 tournaments
Indian Wells Open	NH	A	A	A	A	1R	2R	0 / 2	0–2	0%
Miami Open	NH	A	A	A	1R	2R	2R	0 / 3	1–3	25%
Monte-Carlo Masters	NH	A	A	A	A	A	1R	0 / 1	0–1	0%
Madrid Open	NH	A	A	A	2R	2R	3R	0 / 3	3-3	50%
Italian Open	Q1	A	A	A	3R	2R	SF	0 / 3	7–3	70%
Canadian Open	NH	A	A	A	1R	A	QF	0 / 2	3–2	60%
Cincinnati Open	A	A	A	A	2R	2R	2R	0 / 2	1–3	25%
Shanghai Masters	NH			A	1R	3R	2R	0 / 3	1–3	25%
Paris Masters	A	A	A	A	1R	1R	1R	0 / 3	0–3	0%
Win–loss	0–0	0–0	0–0	0–0	4–7	4–7	8–8	0 / 23	16–23	41%

== ATP Tour finals ==
=== Singles: 7 (5 titles, 2 runner-ups) ===
Legend Grand Slam (–) ATP 1000 (–) ATP 500 (–) ATP 250 (5–2)	Finals by surface Hard (–) Clay (5–2) Grass (–)	Finals by setting Outdoor (5–2) Indoor (–)

Result	W–L	Date	Tournament	Tier	Surface	Opponent	Score
Win	1–0	Feb 2024	Córdoba Open, Argentina	ATP 250	Clay	(Argentina) Facundo Bagnis	6–1, 6–4
Win	2–0	Apr 2025	Grand Prix Hassan II, Morocco	ATP 250	Clay	(Netherlands) Tallon Griekspoor	7–6^{(7–3)}, 7–6^{(7–4)}
Win	3–0	Jul 2025	Swedish Open, Sweden	ATP 250	Clay	(Netherlands) Jesper de Jong	6–4, 3–6, 6–3
Win	4–0	Jul 2025	Croatia Open, Croatia	ATP 250	Clay	(Spain) Carlos Taberner	6–3, 6–3
Loss	4–1	Feb 2026	Argentina Open, Argentina	ATP 250	Clay	(Argentina) Francisco Cerúndolo	4–6, 2–6
Win	5–1	Feb 2026	Chile Open, Chile	ATP 250	Clay	(Germany) Yannick Hanfmann	7–6^{(8–6)}, 7–5
Loss	5–2	Jul 2026	Swedish Open, Sweden	ATP 250	Clay	Andrey Rublev	4–6, 3–6

== ATP Challenger Tour finals ==
=== Singles: 7 (4 titles, 3 runner-ups) ===
Finals by surface
Hard (–)
Clay (4–3)

Result	W–L	Date	Tournament	Surface	Opponent	Score
Loss	0–1	Nov 2021	São Paulo Challenger, Brazil	Clay	(Argentina) Juan Pablo Ficovich	3–6, 5–7
Loss	0–2	Apr 2023	Challenger AAT, Argentina	Clay	(Brazil) Thiago Seyboth Wild	3–6, 3–6
Win	1–2	Aug 2023	Internazionali Città di Todi, Italy	Clay	(France) Clément Tabur	6–4, 6–7^{(5–7)}, 6–1
Win	2–2	Nov 2023	Lima Challenger II, Peru	Clay	(Argentina) Mariano Navone	4–6, 6–3, 7–5
Win	3–2	Jun 2024	Internazionali Città di Perugia, Italy	Clay	(India) Sumit Nagal	6–1, 6–2
Loss	3–3	Mar 2025	Napoli Tennis Cup, Italy	Clay	(Czech Republic) Vít Kopřiva	6–3, 3–6, 6–7^{(4–7)}
Win	4–3	Sep 2025	AON Open, Italy	Clay	(Italy) Andrea Pellegrino	6–1, 6–3

=== Doubles: 12 (4 titles, 8 runner-ups) ===
Finals by surface
Hard (–)
Clay (4–8)

Result	W–L	Date	Tournament	Surface	Partner	Opponents	Score
Win	1–0	Oct 2021	Challenger de Buenos Aires, Argentina	Clay	(Argentina) Juan Bautista Torres	(Argentina) Hernán Casanova (Argentina) Santiago Rodríguez Taverna	7–6^{(7–5)}, 7–6^{(12–10)}
Loss	1–1	Nov 2021	Uruguay Open, Uruguay	Clay	(Uruguay) Ignacio Carou	(Brazil) Rafael Matos (Brazil) Felipe Meligeni Alves	4–6, 4–6
Loss	1–2	Nov 2021	Aberto da República, Brazil	Clay	(Argentina) Genaro Alberto Olivieri	(Brazil) Mateus Alves (Brazil) Gustavo Heide	3–6, 3–6
Loss	1–3	Mar 2022	Gran Canaria Challenger, Spain	Clay	(Italy) Matteo Arnaldi	(France) Sadio Doumbia (France) Fabien Reboul	7–5, 4–6, [7–10]
Loss	1–4	Apr 2022	Challenger de Tigre II, Argentina	Clay	(Argentina) Juan Bautista Torres	(Argentina) Guillermo Durán (Brazil) Felipe Meligeni Alves	6–3, 4–6, [3–10]
Win	2–4	May 2022	Internazionali Città di Vicenza, Italy	Clay	(Argentina) Francisco Comesaña	(Italy) Matteo Gigante (Italy) Francesco Passaro	6–3, 7–6^{(7–4)}
Win	3–4	Jun 2022	Emilia-Romagna Open, Italy	Clay	(Brazil) Fernando Romboli	(Ukraine) Denys Molchanov (Slovakia) Igor Zelenay	6–2, 6–3
Win	4–4	Jun 2022	Aspria Tennis Cup, Italy	Clay	(Brazil) Fernando Romboli	(Ecuador) Diego Hidalgo (Colombia) Cristian Rodríguez	6–4, 2–6, [10–5]
Loss	4–5	Jan 2023	Challenger Concepción, Chile	Clay	(Ukraine) Oleg Prihodko	(Argentina) Guido Andreozzi (Argentina) Guillermo Durán	6–7^{(1–7)}, 7–6^{(7–3)}, [7–10]
Loss	4–6	Mar 2023	Viña Challenger, Chile	Clay	(Italy) Andrea Vavassori	(Ecuador) Diego Hidalgo (Colombia) Cristian Rodríguez	4–6, 6–7^{(5–7)}
Loss	4–7	Jun 2023	Internazionali Città di Perugia, Italy	Clay	(Argentina) Juan Pablo Paz	(Bolivia) Boris Arias (Bolivia) Federico Zeballos	6–7^{(3–7)}, 6–7^{(6–8)}
Loss	4–8	Sep 2023	Antofagasta Challenger, Chile	Clay	(Bolivia) Murkel Dellien	(Bolivia) Boris Arias (Bolivia) Federico Zeballos	7–5, 4–6, [8–10]

== ITF World Tennis Tour finals ==
=== Singles: 4 (2 titles, 2 runner-ups) ===
Finals by surface
Hard (2–1)
Clay (0–1)

Result	W–L	Date	Tournament	Surface	Opponent	Score
Win	1–0	Jun 2021	M15 Monastir, Tunisia	Hard	(Argentina) Santiago Rodríguez Taverna	6–3, 7–5
Loss	1–1	Jun 2021	M15 Monastir, Tunisia	Hard	(United States) Omni Kumar	6–7^{(6–8)}, 3–6
Loss	1–2	Jul 2021	M15 Novi Sad, Serbia	Clay	(Austria) Filip Misolic	4–6, 4–6
Win	2–2	Aug 2021	M15 Monastir, Tunisia	Hard	(Portugal) Duarte Vale	6–2, 6–2

== Wins over top-10 players ==
- Darderi has a 1–5 (16.67%) match record against players who were, at the time the match was played, ranked in the top 10.

Season	2026	Total
Wins	1	1

#	Player	Rk	Event	Surface	Rd	Score	Rk	Ref
2026
1.	(Germany) Alexander Zverev	3	Italian Open, Italy	Clay	4R	1–6, 7–6^{(12–10)}, 6–0	20	

- Key: (Rk) first use, opponent rank; (Rd) round; (Rk) 2nd use, player rank; (Ref) reference; (F) final; (SF) semifinal; (QF) quarterfinal; (#R) rounds 4, 3, 2, 1; (RR) round-robin stage; (Q#) qualifying rounds or stages (3), 2, 1.

*As of 12 May 2026
