= Internazionali di Tennis Città di Perugia =

- 2026 Internazionali di Tennis Città di Perugia

ATP Challenger Tour
- Event name: Internazionali di Tennis Città di Perugia | G.I.Ma. Tennis Cup (2023-)
- Location: Perugia, Italy
- Venue: Tennis Club Perugia
- Category: ATP Challenger Tour 125
- Surface: Clay / Outdoors
- Draw: 32S/32Q/16D
- Prize money: €148,625 (2024)
- Website: internazionaliperugia.it

The Internazionali di Tennis Città di Perugia | G.I.Ma. Tennis Cup (formerly known as the Sidernestor Tennis Cup, Blue Panorama Airlines Tennis Cup and Blu-Express.com Tennis Cup) is a tennis tournament held in Perugia, Italy since 2015. The event is part of the ATP Challenger Tour and is played on outdoor clay courts.

== Past finals ==
=== Singles ===
Year	Champion	Runner-up	Score
2026	(Portugal) Henrique Rocha	(Spain) Daniel Mérida	7–6^{(7–5)}, 6–3
2025	(Italy) Andrea Pellegrino	(Bosnia and Herzegovina) Nerman Fatić	6–2, 6–4
2024	(Italy) Luciano Darderi	(India) Sumit Nagal	6–1, 6–2
2023	(Hungary) Fábián Marozsán	(Italy) Edoardo Lavagno	6–2, 6–3
2022	(Spain) Jaume Munar	(Argentina) Tomás Martín Etcheverry	6–3, 4–6, 6–1
2021	(Argentina) Tomás Martín Etcheverry	(Ukraine) Vitaliy Sachko	7–5, 6–2
2020	Not held		
2019	(Argentina) Federico Delbonis	(Spain) Guillermo García López	6–0, 1–6, 7–6^{(7–5)}
2018	(United States) Ulises Blanch	(Italy) Gianluigi Quinzi	7–5, 6–2
2017	(Serbia) Laslo Đere	(Spain) Daniel Muñoz de la Nava	7–6^{(7–2)}, 6–4
2016	(Argentina) Nicolás Kicker	(Slovenia) Blaž Rola	2–6, 6–3, 6–0
2015	(Spain) Pablo Carreño Busta	(Italy) Matteo Viola	6–2, 6–2

=== Doubles ===
Year	Champions	Runners-up	Score
2026	(Belgium) Sander Gillé (Netherlands) Sem Verbeek	(United States) Ryan Seggerman (United States) Theodore Winegar	7–6^{(7–3)}, 4–6, [10–6]
2025	(Monaco) Romain Arneodo (France) Manuel Guinard	(Netherlands) Robin Haase (United States) Vasil Kirkov	3–6, 6–3, [10–5]
2024	(Argentina) Guido Andreozzi (Mexico) Miguel Ángel Reyes-Varela	(India) Sriram Balaji (Germany) Andre Begemann	6–4, 7–5
2023	(Bolivia) Boris Arias (Bolivia) Federico Zeballos	(Italy) Luciano Darderi (Argentina) Juan Pablo Paz	7–6^{(7–3)}, 7–6^{(8–6)}
2022	(France) Sadio Doumbia (France) Fabien Reboul	(Italy) Marco Bortolotti (Spain) Sergio Martos Gornés	6–2, 6–4
2021	(Ukraine) Vitaliy Sachko (Switzerland) Dominic Stricker	(Argentina) Tomás Martín Etcheverry (Argentina) Renzo Olivo	6–3, 5–7, [10–8]
2020	Not held		
2019	(Bosnia and Herzegovina) Tomislav Brkić (Croatia) Ante Pavić	(Brazil) Rogério Dutra Silva (Poland) Szymon Walków	6–4, 6–3
2018	(Italy) Daniele Bracciali (Italy) Matteo Donati	(Bosnia and Herzegovina) Tomislav Brkić (Croatia) Ante Pavić	6–3, 3–6, [10–7]
2017	(Italy) Salvatore Caruso (France) Jonathan Eysseric	(Argentina) Nicolás Kicker (Brazil) Fabrício Neis	6–3, 6–3
2016	(Brazil) Rogério Dutra Silva (Argentina) Andrés Molteni	(Colombia) Nicolás Barrientos (Brazil) Fabrício Neis	7–5, 6–3
2015	(Argentina) Andrea Collarini (Argentina) Andrés Molteni	(United States) James Cerretani (Romania) Costin Pavăl	6–3, 7–5
