= 2019 Fergana Challenger – Men's doubles =

Men's doubles
- 2019 Fergana Challenger

Final
- Champions: (United States) Evan King (United States) Hunter Reese
- Runners-up: (Serbia) Nikola Čačić (Chinese Taipei) Yang Tsung-hua
- Score: 6–3, 5–7, [10–4]

Events
Singles	men	women
Doubles	men	women
← 2018 ·	Fergana Challenger	· 2020 →

Ivan Gakhov and Alexander Pavlioutchenkov were the defending champions but chose to participate with different partners. Gakhov partnered John Paul Fruttero but lost in the quarterfinals to Andrés Artuñedo and Emil Ruusuvuori. Pavlioutchenkov partnered Pavel Kotov but lost in the first round to Arjun Kadhe and Vijay Sundar Prashanth.

Evan King and Hunter Reese won the title after defeating Nikola Čačić and Yang Tsung-hua 6–3, 5–7, [10–4] in the final.

== Seeds ==
1. (United States) Evan King / (United States) Hunter Reese (champions)
2. (Serbia) Nikola Čačić / (Chinese Taipei) Yang Tsung-hua (final)
3. (Kazakhstan) Timur Khabibulin / (Ukraine) Vladyslav Manafov (semifinals)
4. (United States) John Paul Fruttero / (Russia) Ivan Gakhov (quarterfinals)

== Draw ==
=== Key ===
- Q = Qualifier
- WC = Wild card
- LL = Lucky loser
- Alt = Alternate
- SE = Special exempt
- PR = Protected ranking
- ITF = ITF entry
- JE = Junior exempt
- w/o = Walkover
- r = Retired
- d = Defaulted
- SR = Special ranking

First round
1	(United States) E King (United States) H Reese	6	6
WC	(Uzbekistan) Adil Karimov (Uzbekistan) Amal Sultanbekov	2	0
(Chile) MT Barrios Vera (Dominican Republic) R Cid Subervi	4	6	[10]
(Austria) M Neuchrist (France) G Sakharov	6	2	[8]
3	(Kazakhstan) T Khabibulin (Ukraine) V Manafov	6	6
(Russia) T Gabashvili (Bosnia and Herzegovina) A Šetkić	3	4
(Japan) T Matsui (Japan) K Uesugi	6^{5}	5
WC	(Uzbekistan) S Fayziev (Uzbekistan) K Sultanov	7^{7}	7
(Spain) A Artuñedo (Finland) E Ruusuvuori	6	6
Alt	(Turkey) A Çelikbilek (Turkey) C İlkel	1	4
Alt	(Israel) E Leshem (Australia) A Vukic	6^{5}	7^{8}	[5]
4	(United States) JP Fruttero (Russia) I Gakhov	7^{7}	6^{6}	[10]
(India) A Kadhe (India) VS Prashanth	6	7^{7}
(Russia) P Kotov (Russia) A Pavlioutchenkov	2	6^{2}
WC	(Uzbekistan) S Fomin (Kazakhstan) D Yevseyev	3	6^{4}
2	(Serbia) N Čačić (Chinese Taipei) T-h Yang	6	7^{7}

Quarterfinals
1	(United States) E King (United States) H Reese	w/o
(Chile) MT Barrios Vera (Dominican Republic) R Cid Subervi
3	(Kazakhstan) T Khabibulin (Ukraine) V Manafov	6	6^{5}	[10]
WC	(Uzbekistan) S Fayziev (Uzbekistan) K Sultanov	4	7^{7}	[3]
(Spain) A Artuñedo (Finland) E Ruusuvuori	7^{14}	7^{7}
4	(United States) JP Fruttero (Russia) I Gakhov	6^{12}	6^{5}
(India) A Kadhe (India) VS Prashanth	5	3
2	(Serbia) N Čačić (Chinese Taipei) T-h Yang	7	6

Semifinals
1	(United States) E King (United States) H Reese	6	6^{4}	[16]
3	(Kazakhstan) T Khabibulin (Ukraine) V Manafov	4	7^{7}	[14]
(Spain) A Artuñedo (Finland) E Ruusuvuori	5	6^{4}
2	(Serbia) N Čačić (Chinese Taipei) T-h Yang	7	7^{7}

Final
1	(United States) E King (United States) H Reese	6	5	[10]
2	(Serbia) N Čačić (Chinese Taipei) T-h Yang	3	7	[4]
