= 2019 Fergana Challenger =

Tennis tournament

- Date: 3–9 June (women); 17–23 June (men)
- Edition: 20th (men); 9th (women)
- Prize money: $54,160 (men) $25,000 (women)
- Surface: Hard
- Location: Fergana, Uzbekistan

Champions

Men's singles
- (Finland) Emil Ruusuvuori

Women's singles
- (Russia) Kamilla Rakhimova

Men's doubles
- (United States) Evan King / (United States) Hunter Reese

Women's doubles
- (Uzbekistan) Nigina Abduraimova / (Turkey) Berfu Cengiz
- Fergana Challenger

The 2019 Fergana Challenger was a professional tennis tournament played on hard courts. It was the 20th edition of the tournament for men which was part of the 2019 ATP Challenger Tour, and the ninth edition of the event for women on the 2019 ITF Women's World Tennis Tour. It took place in Fergana, Uzbekistan, between 3–9 June (women) and 17–23 June (men).

== Men's singles main draw entrants ==
=== Seeds ===
Country	Player	Rank^{1}	Seed
SRB	Peđa Krstin	209	1
FRA	Gleb Sakharov	264	2
SUI	Marc-Andrea Hüsler	270	3
TUR	Cem İlkel	275	4
IND	Sasikumar Mukund	282	5
CHI	Marcelo Tomás Barrios Vera	284	6
RUS	Pavel Kotov	286	7
TPE	Yang Tsung-hua	296	8
KAZ	Denis Yevseyev	306	9
AUS	Aleksandar Vukic	310	10
USA	Evan King	316	11
DOM	Roberto Cid Subervi	329	12
BIH	Aldin Šetkić	331	13
FRA	Baptiste Crepatte	340	14
CHI	Alejandro Tabilo	341	15
CHN	Wu Di	348	16

- ^{1} Rankings as of 10 June 2019.

=== Other entrants ===
The following players received wildcards into the singles main draw:

- (Uzbekistan) Olimjon Nabiev
- (Uzbekistan) Saida'Lo Saidkarimov
- (Uzbekistan) Shonigmatjon Shofayziyev
- (Uzbekistan) Timur Sottimov
- (Uzbekistan) Ibrokhimjon Urinov

The following players received entry into the singles main draw using their ITF World Tennis Ranking:

- (Uzbekistan) Sanjar Fayziev
- (Russia) Konstantin Kravchuk
- (Egypt) Karim-Mohamed Maamoun
- (Russia) Ivan Nedelko
- (Russia) Alexander Zhurbin

The following players received entry into the singles main draw as alternates:

- (Russia) Anton Chekhov
- (Uzbekistan) Sergey Fomin
- (India) Vijay Sundar Prashanth

The following players received entry from the qualifying draw:

- (Kazakhstan) Timur Khabibulin
- (Russia) Alexey Zakharov

== Women's singles main draw entrants ==
=== Seeds ===
Country	Player	Rank^{1}	Seed
UZB	Sabina Sharipova	169	1
RUS	Sofya Lansere	312	2
TUR	Berfu Cengiz	341	3
UZB	Nigina Abduraimova	351	4
RUS	Ekaterina Yashina	379	5
RUS	Kamilla Rakhimova	422	6
RUS	Polina Monova	427	7
KAZ	Gozal Ainitdinova	481	8

- ^{1} Rankings as of 27 May 2019

=== Other entrants ===
The following players received wildcards into the singles main draw:

- (Kazakhstan) Yekaterina Dmitrichenko
- (Uzbekistan) Milana Maslenkova
- (Uzbekistan) Setora Normurodova
- (Uzbekistan) Sarvinoz Saidhujaeva

The following players received entry into the singles main draw using their ITF World Tennis Ranking:

- (Russia) Daria Kruzhkova
- (Belarus) Sadafmoh Tolibova
- (Russia) Valeriya Yushchenko
- (Ukraine) Marianna Zakarlyuk
- (Russia) Anastasia Zakharova

The following players received entry from the qualifying draw:

- (Australia) Isabella Bozicevic
- (Kazakhstan) Dariya Detkovskaya
- (Uzbekistan) Arina Folts
- (Uzbekistan) Shakhnoza Khatamova
- (Russia) Ksenia Kolesnikova
- (Russia) Margarita Lazareva
- (Russia) Ekaterina Nikiforova
- (Uzbekistan) Sevil Yuldasheva

== Champions ==
=== Men's singles ===
- (Finland) Emil Ruusuvuori def. (Dominican Republic) Roberto Cid Subervi 6–3, 6–2.

=== Women's singles ===
- (Russia) Kamilla Rakhimova def. (Russia) Valeriya Yushchenko, 6–1, 7–5

=== Men's doubles ===
- (United States) Evan King / (United States) Hunter Reese def. (Serbia) Nikola Čačić / (Chinese Taipei) Yang Tsung-hua 6–3, 5–7, [10–4].

=== Women's doubles ===
- (Uzbekistan) Nigina Abduraimova / (Turkey) Berfu Cengiz def. (Australia) Isabella Bozicevic / (Russia) Ksenia Laskutova, 4–6, 6–1, [10–3]
