= 2020 Ann Arbor Challenger =

- Date: 6–12 January 2020
- Edition: 1st
- Category: ATP Challenger Tour
- Draw: 48S / 16D
- Surface: Hard (indoor)
- Location: Ann Arbor, Michigan, United States

Champions

Singles
- (United States) Ulises Blanch

Doubles
- (United States) Robert Galloway / (Mexico) Hans Hach Verdugo
- Ann Arbor Challenger

The 2020 Ann Arbor Challenger was a professional tennis tournament played on indoor hard courts. It was the tournament's first edition, a part of the 2020 ATP Challenger Tour. It took place in Ann Arbor, Michigan, United States between January 6 and 12, 2020.

== Singles main-draw entrants ==
=== Seeds ===
Country	Player	Rank^{1}	Seed
USA	Bjorn Fratangelo	207	1
USA	Noah Rubin	210	2
USA	Sebastian Korda	249	3
DOM	Roberto Cid Subervi	258	4
BEL	Ruben Bemelmans	260	5
ARG	Renzo Olivo	265	6
ECU	Roberto Quiroz	266	7
USA	JC Aragone	275	8
CRO	Nino Serdarušić	278	9
GER	Daniel Altmaier	279	10
JPN	Kaichi Uchida	286	11
USA	Kevin King	298	12
BRA	Pedro Sakamoto	308	13
USA	Michael Redlicki	314	14
USA	Sekou Bangoura	316	15
BRA	Thomaz Bellucci	319	16

- ^{1} Rankings are as of December 30, 2019.

=== Other entrants ===
The following players received wildcards into the singles main draw:

- (United States) Andrew Fenty
- (United States) Aleksandar Kovacevic
- (United States) John McNally
- (Czech Republic) Ondřej Štyler
- (United States) Zachary Svajda

The following players received entry into the singles main draw using protected rankings:

- (Colombia) Nicolás Barrientos
- (United States) Patrick Kypson

The following players received entry from the qualifying draw:

- (Colombia) Alejandro Gómez
- (United States) Strong Kirchheimer

== Champions ==
=== Singles ===
- (United States) Ulises Blanch def. (Dominican Republic) Roberto Cid Subervi 3–6, 6–4, 6–2.

=== Doubles ===
- (United States) Robert Galloway / (Mexico) Hans Hach Verdugo def. (Colombia) Nicolás Barrientos / (Colombia) Alejandro Gómez 4–6, 6–4, [10–8].
