= 2018 Internazionali di Tennis Città di Perugia – Singles =

Singles
- 2018 Internazionali di Tennis Città di Perugia

Final
- Champion: (United States) Ulises Blanch
- Runner-up: (Italy) Gianluigi Quinzi
- Score: 7–5, 6–2

Events
Singles	Doubles
- Internazionali di Tennis Città di Perugia

Laslo Đere was the defending champion but chose not to defend his title.

Ulises Blanch won the title after defeating Gianluigi Quinzi 7–5, 6–2 in the final.

== Seeds ==
1. (Austria) Gerald Melzer (first round)
2. (Spain) Pablo Andújar (first round)
3. (Slovenia) Blaž Kavčič (withdrew)
4. (Spain) Enrique López Pérez (first round)
5. (Serbia) Nikola Milojević (second round, retired)
6. (Italy) Matteo Donati (second round)
7. (Hungary) Attila Balázs (semifinals)
8. (Spain) Carlos Taberner (second round)
9. (France) Kenny de Schepper (second round)

== Draw ==
Key

- Q = Qualifier
- WC = Wild card
- LL = Lucky loser
- Alt = Alternate
- ITF = ITF entry
- PR = Protected ranking
- SR = Special ranking
- SE = Special exempt
- JE = Junior exempt
- JR = Junior Accelerator Programme entrant
- CO = College Accelerator Programme entrant
- NG = Next Gen Accelerator Program entrant
- w/o = Walkover
- r = Retired
- d = Defaulted

=== Finals ===
Semifinals
(Italy) Salvatore Caruso	2	0
(Italy) Gianluigi Quinzi	6	6
LL	(United States) Ulises Blanch	6	6
7	(Hungary) Attila Balázs	4	2

Final
(Italy) Gianluigi Quinzi	5	2
LL	(United States) Ulises Blanch	7	6

=== Top half ===
First round
1	(Austria) G Melzer	1	6	6^{4}
(Bosnia and Herzegovina) T Brkić	6	1	7^{7}
(Argentina) F Argüello	6	4	2
(Italy) A Giannessi	3	6	6
Q	(Croatia) A Pavić	4	7^{10}	3
(Italy) S Caruso	6	6^{8}	6
(Colombia) DE Galán	6^{1}	2
5	(Serbia) N Milojević	7^{7}	6
9	(France) K de Schepper	6	6
(Croatia) N Serdarušić	4	4
(Spain) D Gimeno Traver	7	6
(Dominican Republic) R Cid Subervi	5	3
(Spain) R Ojeda Lara	4	5
(Italy) G Quinzi	6	7
Q	(Ecuador) G Escobar	6^{2}	4
6	(Italy) M Donati	7^{7}	6

Second round
(Bosnia and Herzegovina) T Brkić	1	2
(Italy) A Giannessi	6	6
(Italy) S Caruso	6	2
5	(Serbia) N Milojević	4	1^{r}
9	(France) K de Schepper	4	6	1
(Spain) D Gimeno Traver	6	3	6
(Italy) G Quinzi	6	6
6	(Italy) M Donati	4	4

Quarterfinals
(Italy) A Giannessi	6	4	4
(Italy) S Caruso	4	6	6
(Spain) D Gimeno Traver	1	2
(Italy) G Quinzi	6	6

Semifinals
(Italy) S Caruso	2	0
(Italy) G Quinzi	6	6

=== Bottom half ===
First round
8	(Spain) C Taberner	6	6
WC	(Italy) J Berrettini	2	2
WC	(Spain) N Almagro	4	5
LL	(United States) U Blanch	6	7
Q	(Spain) P Toledo Bagué	7^{7}	3	6
WC	(Italy) E Dalla Valle	6^{5}	6	4
(Spain) B Zapata Miralles	7^{7}	3	6
4	(Spain) E López Pérez	6^{2}	6	4
7	(Hungary) A Balázs	6	3
(France) G Barrère	4	0^{r}
Q	(Colombia) C Rodríguez	2	4
(Slovenia) B Rola	6	6
(France) G Sakharov	4	6	6
(Portugal) J Domingues	6	3	3
(Argentina) M Trungelliti	6	6
2/WC	(Spain) P Andújar	3	2

Second round
8	(Spain) C Taberner	5	4
LL	(United States) U Blanch	7	6
Q	(Spain) P Toledo Bagué	2	0
(Spain) B Zapata Miralles	6	6
7	(Hungary) A Balázs	6	6
(Slovenia) B Rola	1	3
(France) G Sakharov	6	5	4
(Argentina) M Trungelliti	4	7	6

Quarterfinals
LL	(United States) U Blanch	6	6
(Spain) B Zapata Miralles	4	4
7	(Hungary) A Balázs	6	7^{7}
(Argentina) M Trungelliti	2	6^{3}

Semifinals
LL	(United States) U Blanch	6	6
7	(Hungary) A Balázs	4	2
