= 2019 Dutch Open – Singles =

Singles
- 2019 Dutch Open

Final
- Champion: (Germany) Mats Moraing
- Runner-up: (Belgium) Kimmer Coppejans
- Score: 6–2, 3–6, 6–3

Events
Singles	Doubles
- Dutch Open

This was the first edition of the tournament as a Challenger event.

Mats Moraing won the title after defeating Kimmer Coppejans 6–2, 3–6, 6–3 in the final.

== Seeds ==
All seeds receive a bye into the second round.

1. (Spain) Pedro Martínez (quarterfinals)
2. (Belgium) Kimmer Coppejans (final)
3. (Slovenia) Blaž Rola (semifinals)
4. (Netherlands) Tallon Griekspoor (second round)
5. (Germany) Mats Moraing (champion)
6. (France) Elliot Benchetrit (third round)
7. (Egypt) Mohamed Safwat (third round)
8. (Spain) Nicola Kuhn (second round)
9. (Czech Republic) Zdeněk Kolář (quarterfinals)
10. (Spain) Daniel Gimeno Traver (quarterfinals)
11. (Germany) Daniel Masur (quarterfinals)
12. (Brazil) Thomaz Bellucci (second round)
13. (Belarus) Uladzimir Ignatik (third round)
14. (Netherlands) Thiemo de Bakker (second round)
15. (Germany) Tobias Kamke (second round)
16. (France) Johan Tatlot (second round)

== Draw ==
Key

- Q = Qualifier
- WC = Wild card
- LL = Lucky loser
- Alt = Alternate
- ITF = ITF entry
- PR = Protected ranking
- SR = Special ranking
- SE = Special exempt
- JE = Junior exempt
- JR = Junior Accelerator Programme entrant
- CO = College Accelerator Programme entrant
- NG = Next Gen Accelerator Program entrant
- w/o = Walkover
- r = Retired
- d = Defaulted

=== Finals ===
Quarterfinals
1	(Spain) Pedro Martínez	4	2
5	(Germany) Mats Moraing	6	6
Q	(Netherlands) Igor Sijsling	6	7
10	(Spain) Daniel Gimeno Traver	3	5
9	(Czech Republic) Zdeněk Kolář	5	4
3	(Slovenia) Blaž Rola	7	6
11	(Germany) Daniel Masur	6	4	4
2	(Belgium) Kimmer Coppejans	2	6	6

Semifinals
5	(Germany) Mats Moraing	6	6
Q	(Netherlands) Igor Sijsling	4	3
3	(Slovenia) Blaž Rola	4	0
2	(Belgium) Kimmer Coppejans	6	6

Final
5	(Germany) Mats Moraing	6	3	6
2	(Belgium) Kimmer Coppejans	2	6	3

=== Top half ===
==== Section 1 ====
First round
ITF	(France) C Denolly	6^{6}	6	1
ITF	(Egypt) K-M Maamoun	7^{8}	3	6
(Portugal) F Ferreira Silva	5	1
(Brazil) G Clezar	7	6
(Netherlands) J Sels	7^{8}	2	6
ITF	(Netherlands) B van de Zandschulp	6^{6}	6	3
PR	(Georgia (country)) A Metreveli	6	4	6
WC	(Netherlands) N Lootsma	3	6	4

Second round
1	(Spain) P Martínez	7^{7}	1	6
ITF	(Egypt) K-M Maamoun	6^{2}	6	2
(Brazil) G Clezar	6	6
15	(Germany) T Kamke	2	2
12	(Brazil) T Bellucci	1	4
(Netherlands) J Sels	6	6
PR	(Georgia (country)) A Metreveli	3	1
5	(Germany) M Moraing	6	6

Third round
1	(Spain) P Martínez	7^{7}	6
(Brazil) G Clezar	6^{5}	2
(Netherlands) J Sels	6^{6}	2
5	(Germany) M Moraing	7^{8}	6

Quarterfinals
1	(Spain) P Martínez	4	2
5	(Germany) M Moraing	6	6

==== Section 2 ====
First round
WC	(Netherlands) Ryan Nijboer	4	2
(Germany) S Fanselow	6	6
(Germany) J Lenz	4	1
Q	(Netherlands) I Sijsling	6	6
(Finland) E Ruusuvuori	6	6
Q	(Netherlands) S Verbeek	3	4
(Russia) A Avidzba	3	2
ITF	(Belgium) Christopher Heyman	6	6

Second round
4	(Netherlands) T Griekspoor	6	4	3
(Germany) S Fanselow	1	6	6
Q	(Netherlands) I Sijsling	6	7
16	(France) J Tatlot	3	5
10	(Spain) D Gimeno Traver	6	7^{7}
(Finland) E Ruusuvuori	2	6^{4}
ITF	(Belgium) C Heyman	2	1
7	(Egypt) M Safwat	6	6

Third round
(Germany) S Fanselow	5	3
Q	(Netherlands) I Sijsling	7	6
10	(Spain) D Gimeno Traver	6	7^{7}
7	(Egypt) M Safwat	1	6^{2}

Quarterfinals
Q	(Netherlands) I Sijsling	6	7
10	(Spain) D Gimeno Traver	3	5

=== Bottom half ===
==== Section 3 ====
First round
(France) S Robert	7	5	2
(Russia) I Gakhov	5	7	6
(Netherlands) S Griekspoor	6	4	6^{7}
WC	(Netherlands) J de Jong	4	6	7^{9}
ITF	(Netherlands) T van Rijthoven	4	7^{7}	7^{9}
(Ecuador) G Escobar	6	6^{1}	6^{7}
(France) TK Wang	3	2
(Czech Republic) A Pavlásek	6	6

Second round
8	(Spain) N Kuhn	5	6	3
(Russia) I Gakhov	7	4	6
WC	(Netherlands) J de Jong	6^{3}	3
9	(Czech Republic) Z Kolář	7^{7}	6
13	(Belarus) U Ignatik	6	6
ITF	(Netherlands) T van Rijthoven	4	4
(Czech Republic) A Pavlásek	6	3	1
3	(Slovenia) B Rola	4	6	6

Third round
(Russia) I Gakhov	1	6^{5}
9	(Czech Republic) Z Kolář	6	7^{7}
13	(Belarus) U Ignatik	4	6	0
3	(Slovenia) B Rola	6	4	6

Quarterfinals
9	(Czech Republic) Z Kolář	5	4
3	(Slovenia) B Rola	7	6

==== Section 4 ====
First round
WC	(Netherlands) Alec Deckers	3	4
(France) K de Schepper	6	6
WC	(Denmark) H Rune	6	6
(Netherlands) G Brouwer	4	2
(Spain) R Ojeda Lara	2	3
(United Kingdom) J Choinski	6	6
(France) G Blancaneaux	5	1
(Bulgaria) D Kuzmanov	7	6

Second round
6	(France) E Benchetrit	7^{13}	6
(France) K de Schepper	6^{11}	3
WC	(Denmark) H Rune	6	4	1
11	(Germany) D Masur	3	6	6
14	(Netherlands) T de Bakker	2	7	2
(United Kingdom) J Choinski	6	5	6
(Bulgaria) D Kuzmanov	3	6	1
2	(Belgium) K Coppejans	6	1	6

Third round
6	(France) E Benchetrit	2	2
11	(Germany) D Masur	6	6
(United Kingdom) J Choinski	6^{5}	4
2	(Belgium) K Coppejans	7^{7}	6

Quarterfinals
11	(Germany) D Masur	6	4	4
2	(Belgium) K Coppejans	2	6	6
