= 2020 Ann Arbor Challenger – Doubles =

Doubles
- 2020 Ann Arbor Challenger

Final
- Champions: (United States) Robert Galloway (Mexico) Hans Hach Verdugo
- Runners-up: (Colombia) Nicolás Barrientos (Colombia) Alejandro Gómez
- Score: 4–6, 6–4, [10–8]

Events
Singles	Doubles
- Ann Arbor Challenger

This was the first edition of the tournament.

Robert Galloway and Hans Hach Verdugo won the title after defeating Nicolás Barrientos and Alejandro Gómez 4–6, 6–4, [10–8] in the final.

== Seeds ==
1. (United States) Evan King / (United States) Hunter Reese (quarterfinals)
2. (Venezuela) Luis David Martínez / (Brazil) Fernando Romboli (semifinals)
3. (United States) Robert Galloway / (Mexico) Hans Hach Verdugo (champions)
4. (Philippines) Treat Huey / (United States) Nathaniel Lammons (quarterfinals)

== Draw ==
Key

- Q = Qualifier
- WC = Wild card
- LL = Lucky loser
- Alt = Alternate
- ITF = ITF entry
- PR = Protected ranking
- SR = Special ranking
- SE = Special exempt
- JE = Junior exempt
- JR = Junior Accelerator Programme entrant
- CO = College Accelerator Programme entrant
- NG = Next Gen Accelerator Program entrant
- w/o = Walkover
- r = Retired
- d = Defaulted

First round
1	(United States) E King (United States) H Reese	7	6
PR	(United States) C Harrison (United States) S Korda	5	3
PR	(Colombia) N Barrientos (Colombia) A Gómez	6^{1}	7^{7}	[10]
(Ecuador) D Hidalgo (United States) Ma Redlicki	7^{7}	6^{4}	[7]
4	(Philippines) T Huey (United States) N Lammons	6	6
(Belgium) R Bemelmans (Croatia) N Serdarušić	3	3
WC	(United States) Nick Beaty (United States) Connor Johnston	2	5
WC	(United States) A Fenty (Estonia) M Siimar	6	7
(Italy) J Ocleppo (Ecuador) R Quiroz	6^{9}	7^{7}	[10]
(United Kingdom) L Glasspool (United States) A Lawson	7^{11}	6^{4}	[7]
(Brazil) T Bellucci (Brazil) P Sakamoto	7^{7}	4	[7]
3	(United States) R Galloway (Mexico) H Hach Verdugo	6^{5}	6	[10]
WC	(United States) S Kozlov (United States) K Lovett	3	6	[4]
(United States) JC Aragone (United States) S Bangoura	6	2	[10]
(United States) N Pasha (United States) M Schnur	6^{2}	5
2	(Venezuela) LD Martínez (Brazil) F Romboli	7^{7}	7

Quarterfinals
1	(United States) E King (United States) H Reese	4	6	[3]
PR	(Colombia) N Barrientos (Colombia) A Gómez	6	3	[10]
4	(Philippines) T Huey (United States) N Lammons	3	6^{5}
WC	(United States) A Fenty (Estonia) M Siimar	6	7^{7}
(Italy) J Ocleppo (Ecuador) R Quiroz	7^{8}	3	[7]
3	(United States) R Galloway (Mexico) H Hach Verdugo	6^{6}	6	[10]
(United States) JC Aragone (United States) S Bangoura	3	6^{6}
2	(Venezuela) LD Martínez (Brazil) F Romboli	6	7^{8}

Semifinals
PR	(Colombia) N Barrientos (Colombia) A Gómez	4	6	[11]
WC	(United States) A Fenty (Estonia) M Siimar	6	3	[9]
3	(United States) R Galloway (Mexico) H Hach Verdugo	6^{5}	6	[10]
2	(Venezuela) LD Martínez (Brazil) F Romboli	7^{7}	2	[6]

Final
PR	(Colombia) N Barrientos (Colombia) A Gómez	6	4	[8]
3	(United States) R Galloway (Mexico) H Hach Verdugo	4	6	[10]
