= 2020 Morelos Open – Doubles =

Doubles
- 2020 Morelos Open

Final
- Champions: (Australia) Luke Saville (Australia) John-Patrick Smith
- Runners-up: (Spain) Carlos Gómez-Herrera (Japan) Shintaro Mochizuki
- Score: 6–3, 6–7^{(4–7)}, [10–5]

Events
Singles	Doubles
← 2019 ·	Morelos Open	· 2022 →

André Göransson and Marc-Andrea Hüsler were the defending champions but chose not to defend their title.

Luke Saville and John-Patrick Smith won the title after defeating Carlos Gómez-Herrera and Shintaro Mochizuki 6–3, 6–7^{(4–7)}, [10–5] in the final.

== Seeds ==
1. (Australia) Luke Saville / (Australia) John-Patrick Smith (champions)
2. (Venezuela) Luis David Martínez / (Mexico) Miguel Ángel Reyes-Varela (quarterfinals)
3. (United States) Robert Galloway / (Mexico) Hans Hach Verdugo (semifinals)
4. (United States) Nathan Pasha / (United States) Max Schnur (first round)

== Draw ==
Key

- Q = Qualifier
- WC = Wild card
- LL = Lucky loser
- Alt = Alternate
- ITF = ITF entry
- PR = Protected ranking
- SR = Special ranking
- SE = Special exempt
- JE = Junior exempt
- JR = Junior Accelerator Programme entrant
- CO = College Accelerator Programme entrant
- NG = Next Gen Accelerator Program entrant
- w/o = Walkover
- r = Retired
- d = Defaulted

First round
1	(Australia) L Saville (Australia) J-P Smith	6	6
Alt	(Colombia) A González (Brazil) Oscar José Gutierrez	1	4
WC	(Brazil) G Clezar (Mexico) M Sánchez	7	4	[0]
(Australia) H Bourchier (India) R Ramanathan	5	6	[10]
3	(United States) R Galloway (Mexico) H Hach Verdugo	7^{7}	7^{7}
(Philippines) R Gonzales (South Africa) R Roelofse	6^{2}	6^{4}
(Ecuador) D Hidalgo (United States) Ma Redlicki	7^{8}	4	[4]
(United States) JC Aragone (Ecuador) R Quiroz	6^{6}	6	[10]
WC	(Mexico) L Patiño (Argentina) A Velotti	4	2
WC	(Spain) C Gómez-Herrera (Japan) S Mochizuki	6	6
(Canada) P Polansky (Kazakhstan) D Popko	4	6	[10]
4	(United States) N Pasha (United States) M Schnur	6	4	[5]
(Zimbabwe) B Lock (Spain) A Menéndez Maceiras	4	6	[10]
(Austria) S Ofner (Austria) J Rodionov	6	3	[8]
(United States) E King (Zimbabwe) CJ Lock	4	4
2	(Venezuela) LD Martínez (Mexico) MÁ Reyes-Varela	6	6

Quarterfinals
1	(Australia) L Saville (Australia) J-P Smith	6	6
(Australia) H Bourchier (India) R Ramanathan	3	4
3	(United States) R Galloway (Mexico) H Hach Verdugo	4	6	[10]
(United States) JC Aragone (Ecuador) R Quiroz	6	3	[8]
WC	(Spain) C Gómez-Herrera (Japan) S Mochizuki	6	6
(Canada) P Polansky (Kazakhstan) D Popko	2	4
(Zimbabwe) B Lock (Spain) A Menéndez Maceiras	6	5	[10]
2	(Venezuela) LD Martínez (Mexico) MÁ Reyes-Varela	1	7	[3]

Semifinals
1	(Australia) L Saville (Australia) J-P Smith	7	6
3	(United States) R Galloway (Mexico) H Hach Verdugo	5	2
WC	(Spain) C Gómez-Herrera (Japan) S Mochizuki	6	7^{7}
(Zimbabwe) B Lock (Spain) A Menéndez Maceiras	2	6^{5}

Final
1	(Australia) L Saville (Australia) J-P Smith	6	6^{4}	[10]
WC	(Spain) C Gómez-Herrera (Japan) S Mochizuki	3	7^{7}	[5]
