= 2018 Fergana Challenger =

- Date: 18–24 June
- Edition: 19th (men); 8th (women)
- Surface: Hard
- Location: Fergana, Uzbekistan

Champions

Men's singles
- (Serbia) Nikola Milojević

Women's singles
- (Uzbekistan) Nigina Abduraimova

Men's doubles
- (Russia) Ivan Gakhov / (Russia) Alexander Pavlioutchenkov

Women's doubles
- (Russia) Anastasia Frolova / (Russia) Ekaterina Yashina
- Fergana Challenger

The 2018 Fergana Challenger is a professional tennis tournament played on hard courts. It is the 19th edition of the tournament for men which is part of the 2018 ATP Challenger Tour, and the eighth edition of the event for women on the 2018 ITF Women's Circuit. It takes place in Fergana, Uzbekistan between 18–24 June 2018.

== Men's singles main draw entrants ==
=== Seeds ===
Country	Player	Rank^{1}	Seed
SRB	Nikola Milojević	187	1
ESP	Enrique López Pérez	208	2
POR	Gonçalo Oliveira	227	3
KOR	Lee Duck-hee	229	4
RUS	Ivan Nedelko	238	5
BLR	Egor Gerasimov	245	6
DOM	Roberto Cid Subervi	248	7
JPN	Yosuke Watanuki	252	8

- ^{1} Rankings as of 11 June 2018.

=== Other entrants ===
The following players received wildcards into the singles main draw:

- (Uzbekistan) Farrukh Dustov
- (Uzbekistan) Sanjar Fayziev
- (Uzbekistan) Khumoyun Sultanov
- (Kazakhstan) Denis Yevseyev

The following players received entry from the qualifying draw:

- (Russia) Konstantin Kravchuk
- (India) Saketh Myneni
- (Japan) Shuichi Sekiguchi
- (Chinese Taipei) Wu Tung-lin

== Women's singles main draw entrants ==
=== Seeds ===
Country	Player	Rank^{1}	Seed
UZB	Sabina Sharipova	144	1
RUS	Olga Doroshina	270	2
UZB	Nigina Abduraimova	329	3
UKR	Valeriya Strakhova	338	4
SLO	Nastja Kolar	383	5
RUS	Varvara Flink	395	6
IND	Rutuja Bhosale	403	7
RUS	Anna Morgina	408	8

- ^{1} Rankings as of 11 June 2018.

=== Other entrants ===
The following players received wildcards into the singles main draw:

- (Uzbekistan) Nigora Azimjanova
- (Uzbekistan) Nasiba Espolova
- (Uzbekistan) Arina Folts
- (Uzbekistan) Elina Sharipova

The following players received entry from the qualifying draw:

- (Australia) Isabella Bozicevic
- (India) Sai Samhitha Chamarthi
- (Belarus) Ilona Kremen
- (India) Natasha Palha
- (Russia) Kamilla Rakhimova
- (Moldova) Vitalia Stamat
- (Belarus) Sadafmoh Tolibova
- (Uzbekistan) Guzal Yusupova

== Champions ==
=== Men's singles ===
- (Serbia) Nikola Milojević def. (Spain) Enrique López Pérez 6–3, 6–4.

=== Women's singles ===
- (Uzbekistan) Nigina Abduraimova def. (Russia) Anastasia Frolova, 6–3, 2–0 ret.

=== Men's doubles ===
- (Russia) Ivan Gakhov / (Russia) Alexander Pavlioutchenkov def. (India) Saketh Myneni / (India) Vijay Sundar Prashanth 6–4, 6–4.

=== Women's doubles ===
- (Russia) Anastasia Frolova / (Russia) Ekaterina Yashina def. (Russia) Sofya Lansere / (Russia) Kamilla Rakhimova, 6–1, 7–6^{(7–4)}
