= 2019 Fergana Challenger – Men's singles =

Men's singles
- 2019 Fergana Challenger

Final
- Champion: (Finland) Emil Ruusuvuori
- Runner-up: (Dominican Republic) Roberto Cid Subervi
- Score: 6–3, 6–2

Events
Singles	men	women
Doubles	men	women
← 2018 ·	Fergana Challenger	· 2020 →

Nikola Milojević was the defending champion but chose not to defend his title.

Emil Ruusuvuori won the title after defeating Roberto Cid Subervi 6–3, 6–2 in the final.

== Seeds ==
All seeds receive a bye into the second round.

1. (Serbia) Peđa Krstin (second round)
2. (France) Gleb Sakharov (quarterfinals)
3. (Switzerland) Marc-Andrea Hüsler (second round)
4. (Turkey) Cem İlkel (semifinals)
5. (India) Sasikumar Mukund (second round)
6. (Chile) Marcelo Tomás Barrios Vera (third round)
7. (Russia) Pavel Kotov (quarterfinals, retired)
8. (Chinese Taipei) Yang Tsung-hua (third round)
9. (Kazakhstan) Denis Yevseyev (second round)
10. (Australia) Aleksandar Vukic (quarterfinals)
11. (United States) Evan King (quarterfinals)
12. (Dominican Republic) Roberto Cid Subervi (final)
13. (Bosnia and Herzegovina) Aldin Šetkić (third round)
14. (France) Baptiste Crepatte (third round)
15. (Chile) Alejandro Tabilo (second round)
16. (China) Wu Di (third round)

== Draw ==
=== Key ===
- Q = Qualifier
- WC = Wild card
- LL = Lucky loser
- Alt = Alternate
- SE = Special exempt
- PR = Protected ranking
- ITF = ITF entry
- JE = Junior exempt
- w/o = Walkover
- r = Retired
- d = Defaulted
- SR = Special ranking

=== Finals ===
Quarterfinals
(Finland) Emil Ruusuvuori	7	4
7	(Russia) Pavel Kotov	5	0^{r}
(Uzbekistan) Khumoyun Sultanov	7	6
11	(United States) Evan King	5	1
10	(Australia) Aleksandar Vukic	3	4
4	(Turkey) Cem İlkel	6	6
12	(Dominican Republic) Roberto Cid Subervi	6	6
2	(France) Gleb Sakharov	3	3

Semifinals
(Finland) Emil Ruusuvuori	7^{7}	4	7^{7}
(Uzbekistan) Khumoyun Sultanov	6^{2}	6	6^{1}
4	(Turkey) Cem İlkel	6	1	6^{5}
12	(Dominican Republic) Roberto Cid Subervi	2	6	7^{7}

Final
(Finland) Emil Ruusuvuori	6	6
12	(Dominican Republic) Roberto Cid Subervi	3	2

=== Top half ===
==== Section 1 ====
First round
(Finland) E Ruusuvuori	6	6
(Russia) Dimitriy Voronin	1	1
(Israel) E Leshem	6	6
(Kazakhstan) A Golubev	1	4
(Russia) I Gakhov	6	6
WC	(Uzbekistan) Shonigmatjon Shofayziyev	4	2
(Ukraine) V Manafov	6^{2}	2
(India) Sidharth Rawat	7^{7}	6

Second round
1	(Serbia) P Krstin	6	4	0
(Finland) E Ruusuvuori	4	6	6
(Israel) E Leshem	6	6
15	(Chile) A Tabilo	4	4
9	(Kazakhstan) D Yevseyev	4	6^{9}
(Russia) I Gakhov	6	7^{11}
(India) S Rawat	4	3
7	(Russia) P Kotov	6	6

Third round
(Finland) E Ruusuvuori	6	6
(Israel) E Leshem	3	2
(Russia) I Gakhov	4	6	4
7	(Russia) P Kotov	6	4	6

Quarterfinals
(Finland) E Ruusuvuori	7	4
7	(Russia) P Kotov	5	0^{r}

==== Section 2 ====
First round
(Uzbekistan) K Sultanov	6	6
(India) A Kadhe	2	4
WC	(Uzbekistan) Timur Sottimov	2	2
ITF	(Russia) K Kravchuk	6	6
WC	(Uzbekistan) Olimjon Nabiev	4	7^{7}	0
ITF	(Russia) I Nedelko	6	6^{4}	3^{r}
(Japan) Shuichi Sekiguchi	6	6
(Japan) Makoto Ochi	4	4

Second round
3	(Switzerland) M-A Hüsler	3	3
(Uzbekistan) K Sultanov	6	6
ITF	(Russia) K Kravchuk	6	3	4
14	(France) Baptiste Crepatte	4	6	6
11	(United States) E King	6	6
WC	(Uzbekistan) O Nabiev	2	1
(Japan) S Sekiguchi
6	(Chile) MT Barrios Vera	w/o

Third round
(Uzbekistan) K Sultanov	6	3	6
14	(France) B Crepatte	3	6	1
11	(United States) E King	6	7
6	(Chile) MT Barrios Vera	3	5

Quarterfinals
(Uzbekistan) K Sultanov	7	6
11	(United States) E King	5	1

=== Bottom half ===
==== Section 3 ====
First round
WC	(Uzbekistan) Ibrokhimjon Urinov	3	3
(Russia) T Gabashvili	6	6
Alt	(Russia) Anton Chekhov	0	3
ITF	(Uzbekistan) S Fayziev	6	6
ITF	(Egypt) K-M Maamoun	4	1^{r}
WC	(Uzbekistan) Saida'Lo Saidkarimov	6	2
(United States) S Korda	6	6
Q	(Kazakhstan) T Khabibulin	2	2

Second round
8	(Chinese Taipei) T-h Yang	6	6
(Russia) T Gabashvili	2	2
ITF	(Uzbekistan) S Fayziev	4	6	3
10	(Australia) A Vukic	6	3	6
13	(Bosnia and Herzegovina) A Šetkić	6	6
WC	(Uzbekistan) S Saidkarimov	2	3
(United States) S Korda	6^{5}	7^{12}	3
4	(Turkey) C İlkel	7^{7}	6^{10}	6

Third round
8	(Chinese Taipei) T-h Yang	5	2
10	(Australia) A Vukic	7	6
13	(Bosnia and Herzegovina) A Šetkić	6	3	4
4	(Turkey) C İlkel	3	6	6

Quarterfinals
10	(Australia) A Vukic	3	4
4	(Turkey) C İlkel	6	6

==== Section 4 ====
First round
Alt	(India) VS Prashanth	3	4
(Turkey) A Çelikbilek	6	6
(Japan) Renta Tokuda	7	6^{7}	0
(Spain) A Artuñedo	5	7^{9}	6
ITF	(Russia) A Zhurbin	5	6	6
Alt	(Uzbekistan) S Fomin	7	4	2
(Austria) M Neuchrist	7^{7}	6
Q	(Russia) A Zakharov	6^{5}	3

Second round
5	(India) S Mukund	6	6^{2}	2
(Turkey) A Çelikbilek	3	7^{7}	6
(Spain) A Artuñedo	2	4
12	(Dominican Republic) R Cid Subervi	6	6
16	(China) D Wu	6	7^{7}
ITF	(Russia) A Zhurbin	0	6^{4}
(Austria) M Neuchrist	6^{7}	5
2	(France) G Sakharov	7^{9}	7

Third round
(Turkey) A Çelikbilek	5	6	2
12	(Dominican Republic) R Cid Subervi	7	1	6
16	(China) D Wu	3	6^{4}
2	(France) G Sakharov	6	7^{7}

Quarterfinals
12	(Dominican Republic) R Cid Subervi	6	6
2	(France) G Sakharov	3	3
