= 2020 Morelos Open =

- Date: 17–23 February
- Edition: 7th
- Surface: Hard
- Location: Cuernavaca, Mexico

Champions

Singles
- (Austria) Jurij Rodionov

Doubles
- (Australia) Luke Saville / (Australia) John-Patrick Smith
← 2019 ·	Morelos Open	· 2022 →

The 2020 Morelos Open, known as Morelos Open Crédito Real, was a professional tennis tournament played on outdoor hard courts. It was the seventh edition of the tournament which was part of the 2020 ATP Challenger Tour. It took place in Cuernavaca, Mexico between 17–23 February 2020.

== Singles main draw entrants ==
=== Seeds ===
Country	Player	Rank^{1}	Seed
ISR	Dudi Sela	155	1
AUT	Sebastian Ofner	158	2
KAZ	Dmitry Popko	173	3
IND	Ramkumar Ramanathan	180	4
CAN	Peter Polansky	187	5
USA	Christopher Eubanks	207	6
GER	Daniel Altmaier	220	7
ITA	Gian Marco Moroni	229	8
ARG	Juan Pablo Ficovich	230	9
AUT	Jurij Rodionov	232	10
ESP	Adrián Menéndez Maceiras	243	11
USA	JC Aragone	261	12
ECU	Roberto Quiroz	264	13
ESP	Roberto Ortega Olmedo	265	14
GBR	James Ward	267	15
COL	Santiago Giraldo	274	16

- ^{1} Rankings as of 10 February 2020.

=== Other entrants ===
The following players received wildcards into the singles main draw:

- (Brazil) Thomaz Bellucci
- (Mexico) Alex Hernández
- (Japan) Shintaro Mochizuki
- (Mexico) Luis Patiño
- (Mexico) Manuel Sánchez

The following players received entry from the qualifying draw:

- (Peru) Mauricio Echazú
- (South Africa) Ruan Roelofse

== Champions ==
=== Singles ===
- (Austria) Jurij Rodionov def. (Argentina) Juan Pablo Ficovich 4–6, 6–2, 6–3.

=== Doubles ===
- (Australia) Luke Saville / (Australia) John-Patrick Smith def. (Spain) Carlos Gómez-Herrera / (Japan) Shintaro Mochizuki 6–3, 6–7^{(4–7)}, [10–5].
