= 2020 Morelos Open – Singles =

Singles
- 2020 Morelos Open

Final
- Champion: (Austria) Jurij Rodionov
- Runner-up: (Argentina) Juan Pablo Ficovich
- Score: 4–6, 6–2, 6–3

Events
Singles	Doubles
← 2019 ·	Morelos Open	· 2022 →

Matías Franco Descotte was the defending champion but lost in the second round to Jurij Rodionov.

Rodionov won the title after defeating Juan Pablo Ficovich 4–6, 6–2, 6–3 in the final.

== Seeds ==
All seeds receive a bye into the second round.

1. (Israel) Dudi Sela (second round)
2. (Austria) Sebastian Ofner (third round)
3. (Kazakhstan) Dmitry Popko (third round)
4. (India) Ramkumar Ramanathan (second round)
5. (Canada) Peter Polansky (third round)
6. (United States) Christopher Eubanks (third round)
7. (Germany) Daniel Altmaier (quarterfinals)
8. (Italy) Gian Marco Moroni (second round)
9. (Argentina) Juan Pablo Ficovich (final)
10. (Austria) Jurij Rodionov (champion)
11. (Spain) Adrián Menéndez Maceiras (third round)
12. (United States) JC Aragone (second round)
13. (Ecuador) Roberto Quiroz (third round)
14. (Spain) Roberto Ortega Olmedo (quarterfinals)
15. (United Kingdom) James Ward (second round)
16. (Colombia) Santiago Giraldo (third round)

== Draw ==
=== Key ===
- Q = Qualifier
- WC = Wild card
- LL = Lucky loser
- Alt = Alternate
- SE = Special exempt
- PR = Protected ranking
- ITF = ITF entry
- JE = Junior exempt
- w/o = Walkover
- r = Retired
- d = Defaulted
- SR = Special ranking

=== Finals ===
Quarterfinals
(Tunisia) Aziz Dougaz	6	6
(United States) Alexander Sarkissian	2	0
14	(Spain) Roberto Ortega Olmedo	6	5	5
9	(Argentina) Juan Pablo Ficovich	3	7	7
7	(Germany) Daniel Altmaier	6	6^{3}	4
(Brazil) Guilherme Clezar	3	7^{7}	6
10	(Austria) Jurij Rodionov	7	3	7
(Colombia) Alejandro González	5	6	5

Semifinals
(Tunisia) Aziz Dougaz	6^{3}	6	3
9	(Argentina) Juan Pablo Ficovich	7^{7}	4	6
(Brazil) Guilherme Clezar	6	2	4
10	(Austria) Jurij Rodionov	3	6	6

Final
9	(Argentina) Juan Pablo Ficovich	6	2	3
10	(Austria) Jurij Rodionov	4	6	6

=== Top half ===
==== Section 1 ====
First round
(Tunisia) A Dougaz	7^{7}	6
(Sweden) C Lindell	6^{5}	3
Q	(Peru) M Echazú	4	7^{8}	4
WC	(Mexico) M Sánchez	6	6^{6}	6
(Brazil) Oscar José Gutierrez	6	3	2
WC	(Brazil) T Bellucci	4	6	6
(Russia) Ronald Slobodchikov	6^{5}	2
(United States) A Sarkissian	7^{7}	6

Second round
1	(Israel) D Sela	6	4	4
(Tunisia) A Dougaz	2	6	6
WC	(Mexico) M Sánchez	5	4
16	(Colombia) S Giraldo	7	6
11	(Spain) A Menéndez Maceiras	6	4	6
WC	(Brazil) T Bellucci	2	6	3
(United States) A Sarkissian	6	6
8	(Italy) GM Moroni	3	3

Third round
(Tunisia) A Dougaz	7	6
16	(Colombia) S Giraldo	5	4
11	(Spain) A Menéndez Maceiras	2	6	3
(United States) A Sarkissian	6	1	6

Quarterfinals
(Tunisia) A Dougaz	6	6
(United States) A Sarkissian	2	0

==== Section 2 ====
First round
(United States) Ma Redlicki	6	6
(Australia) L Saville	3	3
(Mexico) G López Villaseñor	6	6
WC	(Japan) S Mochizuki	3	3
Q	(South Africa) R Roelofse	6	6
(Australia) H Bourchier	4	4
(Australia) J-P Smith	4	6	5
(United States) E King	6	3	7

Second round
3	(Kazakhstan) D Popko	6	7
(United States) Ma Redlicki	3	5
(Mexico) G López Villaseñor	5	6	4
14	(Spain) R Ortega Olmedo	7	3	6
9	(Argentina) JP Ficovich	4	6	6
Q	(South Africa) R Roelofse	6	3	4
(United States) E King	0	4
6	(United States) C Eubanks	6	6

Third round
3	(Kazakhstan) D Popko	5	6	0
14	(Spain) R Ortega Olmedo	7	1	6
9	(Argentina) JP Ficovich	3	6	7
6	(United States) C Eubanks	6	3	5

Quarterfinals
14	(Spain) R Ortega Olmedo	6	5	5
9	(Argentina) JP Ficovich	3	7	7

=== Bottom half ===
==== Section 3 ====
First round
WC	(Mexico) A Hernández	3	2
(Colombia) C Rodríguez	6	6
(Dominican Republic) J Hernández-Fernández	3	7^{7}	3
(Tunisia) S Mansouri	6	6^{2}	6
(Argentina) A Velotti	3	2
(Zimbabwe) B Lock	6	6
(Ecuador) D Hidalgo	6^{5}	2
(Brazil) G Clezar	7^{7}	6

Second round
7	(Germany) D Altmaier	6	7^{7}
(Colombia) C Rodríguez	4	6^{3}
(Tunisia) S Mansouri	6	3	6
12	(United States) JC Aragone	2	6	4
13	(Ecuador) R Quiroz	6	5	6
(Zimbabwe) B Lock	2	7	1
(Brazil) G Clezar	7^{7}	4	6
4	(India) R Ramanathan	6^{5}	6	4

Third round
7	(Germany) D Altmaier	6
(Tunisia) S Mansouri	5^{r}
13	(Ecuador) R Quiroz	6^{2}	2
(Brazil) G Clezar	7^{7}	6

Quarterfinals
7	(Germany) D Altmaier	6	6^{3}	4
(Brazil) G Clezar	3	7^{7}	6

==== Section 4 ====
First round
(Brazil) P Sakamoto	7^{7}	6
(Spain) C Gómez-Herrera	6^{5}	2
(United States) C Altamirano	3	5
(Argentina) MF Descotte	6	7
WC	(Mexico) L Patiño	6^{5}	4
(Colombia) A González	7^{7}	6
(Peru) J Panta	3	6	3
(United States) K King	6	3	6

Second round
5	(Canada) P Polansky	6	6
(Brazil) P Sakamoto	4	2
(Argentina) MF Descotte	2	5
10	(Austria) J Rodionov	6	7
15	(United Kingdom) J Ward	6	1	6^{3}
(Colombia) A González	3	6	7^{7}
(United States) K King	6^{1}	3
2	(Austria) S Ofner	7^{7}	6

Third round
5	(Canada) P Polansky	6^{3}	4
10	(Austria) J Rodionov	7^{7}	6
(Colombia) A González	6	6^{3}	6
2	(Austria) S Ofner	2	7^{7}	2

Quarterfinals
10	(Austria) J Rodionov	7	3	7
(Colombia) A González	5	6	5
