= 2019 Morelos Open – Singles =

Singles
- 2019 Morelos Open

Final
- Champion: (Argentina) Matías Franco Descotte
- Runner-up: (Ecuador) Gonzalo Escobar
- Score: 6–1, 6–4

Events
Singles	Doubles
- Morelos Open

Dennis Novikov was the defending champion but lost in the third round to Renzo Olivo.

Matías Franco Descotte won the title after defeating Gonzalo Escobar 6–1, 6–4 in the final.

== Seeds ==
All seeds receive a bye into the second round.

1. (Serbia) Peđa Krstin (second round)
2. (Ecuador) Roberto Quiroz (quarterfinals)
3. (United States) Ernesto Escobedo (second round)
4. (Colombia) Daniel Elahi Galán (third round)
5. (United States) Christian Harrison (third round)
6. (Dominican Republic) Roberto Cid Subervi (second round)
7. (Colombia) Santiago Giraldo (third round)
8. (Denmark) Mikael Torpegaard (second round)
9. (United States) Thai-Son Kwiatkowski (second round)
10. (Spain) Roberto Ortega Olmedo (quarterfinals)
11. (United States) Dennis Novikov (third round)
12. (Croatia) Ante Pavić (second round, retired)
13. (United States) Ulises Blanch (second round)
14. (Germany) Sebastian Fanselow (second round)
15. (United States) Evan King (semifinals)
16. (United States) Alexander Sarkissian (second round, retired)

== Draw ==
Key

- Q = Qualifier
- WC = Wild card
- LL = Lucky loser
- Alt = Alternate
- ITF = ITF entry
- PR = Protected ranking
- SR = Special ranking
- SE = Special exempt
- JE = Junior exempt
- JR = Junior Accelerator Programme entrant
- CO = College Accelerator Programme entrant
- NG = Next Gen Accelerator Program entrant
- w/o = Walkover
- r = Retired
- d = Defaulted

=== Finals ===
Quarterfinals
ITF	(Argentina) Matías Franco Descotte	7^{8}	4	6
10	(Spain) Roberto Ortega Olmedo	6^{6}	6	4
15	(United States) Evan King	7^{7}	6^{4}	6
(Argentina) Renzo Olivo	6^{4}	7^{7}	4
(Ecuador) Gonzalo Escobar	6	6
PR	(Argentina) Facundo Mena	4	4
(Canada) Steven Diez	7^{7}	6
2	(Ecuador) Roberto Quiroz	6^{3}	0

Semifinals
ITF	(Argentina) Matías Franco Descotte	7^{7}	3	7
15	(United States) Evan King	6^{5}	6	5
(Ecuador) Gonzalo Escobar	6	6
(Canada) Steven Diez	2	1

Final
ITF	(Argentina) Matías Franco Descotte	6	6
(Ecuador) Gonzalo Escobar	1	4

=== Top half ===
==== Section 1 ====
First round
WC	(Mexico) L Gómez	3	4
(Chile) MT Barrios Vera	6	6
ITF	(Argentina) MF Descotte	6	3	6
ITF	(Argentina) C Ugo Carabelli	4	6	3
(Spain) Carlos Boluda-Purkiss	6	6
(Peru) JP Varillas	3	4
ITF	(Brazil) J Menezes	6	6
(Netherlands) J Sels	3	2

Second round
1	(Serbia) P Krstin	5	4
(Chile) MT Barrios Vera	7	6
ITF	(Argentina) MF Descotte	6	6
14	(Germany) S Fanselow	4	2
10	(Spain) R Ortega Olmedo	6	6
(Spain) C Boluda-Purkiss	4	4
ITF	(Brazil) J Menezes	7	6
8	(Denmark) M Torpegaard	5	1

Third round
(Chile) MT Barrios Vera	5	6	5
ITF	(Argentina) MF Descotte	7	1	7
10	(Spain) R Ortega Olmedo	7^{8}	6
ITF	(Brazil) J Menezes	6^{6}	3

Quarterfinals
ITF	(Argentina) MF Descotte	7^{8}	4	6
10	(Spain) R Ortega Olmedo	6^{6}	6	4

==== Section 2 ====
First round
WC	(Mexico) G López Villaseñor	6	6
PR	(United States) D Nguyen	3	3
(Colombia) A González	6	6
Alt	(Germany) J Härteis	3	1
WC	(Mexico) M Sánchez	6	6
Q	(Argentina) G Villanueva	3	3
(Argentina) R Olivo	6	6
WC	(Mexico) A Hernández	4	1

Second round
3	(United States) E Escobedo	6^{2}	3
WC	(Mexico) G López Villaseñor	7^{7}	6
(Colombia) A González	4	3
15	(United States) E King	6	6
11	(United States) D Novikov	6	6
WC	(Mexico) M Sánchez	3	2
(Argentina) R Olivo	7^{7}	6
6	(Dominican Republic) R Cid Subervi	6^{4}	3

Third round
WC	(Mexico) G López Villaseñor	4	2
15	(United States) E King	6	6
11	(United States) D Novikov	2	4
(Argentina) R Olivo	6	6

Quarterfinals
15	(United States) E King	7^{7}	6^{4}	6
(Argentina) R Olivo	6^{4}	7^{7}	4

=== Bottom half ===
==== Section 3 ====
First round
Q	(France) M Guinard	7^{7}	6
(Argentina) A Collarini	6^{3}	4
(Ecuador) G Escobar	7^{7}	6
(Japan) Renta Tokuda	6^{4}	4
PR	(Argentina) F Mena	6	6
(Switzerland) M-A Hüsler	4	2
(Italy) A Pellegrino	6	1	1
(Ecuador) E Gómez	4	6	6

Second round
5	(United States) C Harrison	4	6	6
Q	(France) M Guinard	6	1	4
(Ecuador) G Escobar	5	6	6
9	(United States) T-S Kwiatkowski	7	4	2
13	(United States) U Blanch	6	5	2
PR	(Argentina) F Mena	3	7	6
(Ecuador) E Gómez	1	6	6^{6}
4	(Colombia) DE Galán	6	2	7^{8}

Third round
5	(United States) C Harrison	6^{5}	3
(Ecuador) G Escobar	7^{7}	6
PR	(Argentina) F Mena	6	6
4	(Colombia) DE Galán	4	4

Quarterfinals
(Ecuador) G Escobar	6	6
PR	(Argentina) F Mena	4	4

==== Section 4 ====
First round
(United States) Mi Redlicki	4	6	7
(France) TK Wang	6	2	5
(Canada) S Diez	7	6
(Dominican Republic) V Estrella Burgos	5	0
(United States) Evan Song	5	3
(United States) S Kozlov	7	6
ITF	(Brazil) J Souza	6	6
WC	(Mexico) L Patiño	4	3

Second round
7	(Colombia) S Giraldo	6	7
(United States) Mi Redlicki	4	5
(Canada) S Diez	6	2
12	(Croatia) A Pavić	4	0^{r}
16	(United States) A Sarkissian	4	0^{r}
(United States) S Kozlov	6	3
ITF	(Brazil) J Souza	4	0
2	(Ecuador) R Quiroz	6	6

Third round
7	(Colombia) S Giraldo	6	1	1
(Canada) S Diez	3	6	6
(United States) S Kozlov	4	6^{5}
2	(Ecuador) R Quiroz	6	7^{7}

Quarterfinals
(Canada) S Diez	7^{7}	6
2	(Ecuador) R Quiroz	6^{3}	0
