= 2020 Ann Arbor Challenger – Singles =

Singles
- 2020 Ann Arbor Challenger

Final
- Champion: (United States) Ulises Blanch
- Runner-up: (Dominican Republic) Roberto Cid Subervi
- Score: 3–6, 6–4, 6–2

Events
Singles	Doubles
- Ann Arbor Challenger

This was the first edition of the tournament.

Ulises Blanch won the title after defeating Roberto Cid Subervi 3–6, 6–4, 6–2 in the final.

== Seeds ==
All seeds receive a bye into the second round.

1. (United States) Bjorn Fratangelo (quarterfinals)
2. (United States) Noah Rubin (second round)
3. (United States) Sebastian Korda (second round)
4. (Dominican Republic) Roberto Cid Subervi (final)
5. (Belgium) Ruben Bemelmans (second round)
6. (Argentina) Renzo Olivo (second round)
7. (Ecuador) Roberto Quiroz (quarterfinals)
8. (United States) JC Aragone (quarterfinals)
9. (Croatia) Nino Serdarušić (third round)
10. (Germany) Daniel Altmaier (semifinals)
11. (Japan) Kaichi Uchida (second round)
12. (United States) Kevin King (second round)
13. (Brazil) Pedro Sakamoto (third round)
14. (United States) Michael Redlicki (second round)
15. (United States) Sekou Bangoura (third round)
16. (Brazil) Thomaz Bellucci (second round)

== Draw ==
Key

- Q = Qualifier
- WC = Wild card
- LL = Lucky loser
- Alt = Alternate
- ITF = ITF entry
- PR = Protected ranking
- SR = Special ranking
- SE = Special exempt
- JE = Junior exempt
- JR = Junior Accelerator Programme entrant
- CO = College Accelerator Programme entrant
- NG = Next Gen Accelerator Program entrant
- w/o = Walkover
- r = Retired
- d = Defaulted

=== Finals ===
Quarterfinals
1	(United States) Bjorn Fratangelo	6^{4}	2
(United States) Stefan Kozlov	7^{7}	6
4	(Dominican Republic) Roberto Cid Subervi	6	6
7	(Ecuador) Roberto Quiroz	4	4
10	(Germany) Daniel Altmaier	7^{7}	7
(Israel) Edan Leshem	6^{4}	5
8	(United States) JC Aragone	5	7	2
(United States) Ulises Blanch	7	5	6

Semifinals
(United States) Stefan Kozlov	6^{1}	7	3
4	(Dominican Republic) Roberto Cid Subervi	7^{7}	5	6
10	(Germany) Daniel Altmaier	3	4
(United States) Ulises Blanch	6	6

Final
4	(Dominican Republic) Roberto Cid Subervi	6	4	2
(United States) Ulises Blanch	3	6	6

=== Top half ===
==== Section 1 ====
First round
(Ecuador) D Hidalgo	6	5	3
(Portugal) G Elias	2	7	6
(United Kingdom) L Glasspool	4	1
WC	(United States) J McNally	6	6
(France) R Roumane	2	2
(United States) B Nakashima	6	6
(United States) S Kozlov	6	6
(France) A Rinderknech	3	4

Second round
1	(United States) B Fratangelo	6	6
(Portugal) G Elias	3	3
WC	(United States) J McNally	6	6
16	(Brazil) T Bellucci	3	4
12	(United States) K King	3	6^{2}
(United States) B Nakashima	6	7^{7}
(United States) S Kozlov	7^{7}	6
6	(Argentina) R Olivo	6^{2}	2

Third round
1	(United States) B Fratangelo	6	6
WC	(United States) J McNally	3	3
(United States) B Nakashima	6	3	2
(United States) S Kozlov	4	6	6

Quarterfinals
1	(United States) B Fratangelo	6^{4}	2
(United States) S Kozlov	7^{7}	6

==== Section 2 ====
First round
(Argentina) A Velotti	6	6
PR	(Colombia) N Barrientos	4	3
Q	(Colombia) A Gómez	3	7^{7}	6^{4}
(United States) Ma Redlicki	6	6^{4}	7^{7}
(Italy) A Bega	1	4
(France) C Hemery	6	6
(Germany) Tobias Simon	6	6
(United States) E King	4	2

Second round
4	(Dominican Republic) R Cid Subervi	6^{4}	6	7^{15}
(Argentina) A Velotti	7^{7}	2	6^{13}
(United States) Ma Redlicki	6^{8}	3
15	(United States) S Bangoura	7^{10}	6
9	(Croatia) N Serdarušić	3
(France) C Hemery	1^{r}
(Germany) T Simon	4	7^{10}	6^{4}
7	(Ecuador) R Quiroz	6	6^{8}	7^{7}

Third round
4	(Dominican Republic) R Cid Subervi	6	6
15	(United States) S Bangoura	4	4
9	(Croatia) N Serdarušić	5	6^{5}
7	(Ecuador) R Quiroz	7	7^{7}

Quarterfinals
4	(Dominican Republic) R Cid Subervi	6	6
7	(Ecuador) R Quiroz	4	4

=== Bottom half ===
==== Section 3 ====
First round
WC	(United States) A Kovacevic	7^{7}	6
(United States) N Chappell	6^{4}	2
(Russia) A Avidzba	6	6
(United States) Evan Song	4	4
(Zimbabwe) B Lock	3	5
(Russia) A Zakharov	6	7
(Israel) E Leshem	6	6
(Italy) J Ocleppo	4	3

Second round
5	(Belgium) R Bemelmans	2	4
WC	(United States) A Kovacevic	6	6
(Russia) A Avidzba	4	7^{8}	3
10	(Germany) D Altmaier	6	6^{6}	6
13	(Brazil) P Sakamoto	6	7^{9}
(Russia) A Zakharov	2	6^{7}
(Israel) E Leshem	7	6
3	(United States) S Korda	5	3

Third round
WC	(United States) A Kovacevic	7	6^{4}	3
10	(Germany) D Altmaier	5	7^{7}	6
13	(Brazil) P Sakamoto	6	3	5
(Israel) E Leshem	4	6	7

Quarterfinals
10	(Germany) D Altmaier	7^{7}	7
(Israel) E Leshem	6^{4}	5

==== Section 4 ====
First round
WC	(Czech Republic) O Štyler	6^{4}	6^{5}
WC	(United States) A Fenty	7^{7}	7^{7}
(Germany) Lucas Gerch	6	6
WC	(United States) Z Svajda	3	3
(Argentina) JM Cerúndolo	6^{4}	7	5
PR	(United States) P Kypson	7^{7}	5	7
Q	(United States) S Kirchheimer	3	6^{6}
(United States) U Blanch	6	7^{8}

Second round
8	(United States) JC Aragone	6	6
WC	(United States) A Fenty	1	4
(Germany) L Gerch	7^{7}	7
11	(Japan) K Uchida	6^{2}	5
14	(United States) Mi Redlicki	6	2	3
PR	(United States) P Kypson	3	6	6
(United States) U Blanch	7	7^{7}
2	(United States) N Rubin	5	6^{4}

Third round
8	(United States) JC Aragone	3	6	6
(Germany) L Gerch	6	4	4
PR	(United States) P Kypson	6^{2}	2
(United States) U Blanch	7^{7}	6

Quarterfinals
8	(United States) JC Aragone	5	7	2
(United States) U Blanch	7	5	6
