= 2019 Morelos Open =

- Date: 18–24 February
- Edition: 6th
- Surface: Hard
- Location: Cuernavaca, Mexico

Champions

Singles
- (Argentina) Matías Franco Descotte

Doubles
- (Sweden) André Göransson / (Switzerland) Marc-Andrea Hüsler
- Morelos Open

The 2019 Morelos Open, known as Morelos Open Crédito Real, was a professional tennis tournament played on outdoor hard courts. It was the sixth edition of the tournament which was part of the 2019 ATP Challenger Tour. It took place in Cuernavaca, Mexico between 18–24 February 2019.

== Singles main draw entrants ==
=== Seeds ===
Country	Player	Rank^{1}	Seed
SRB	Peđa Krstin	174	1
ECU	Roberto Quiroz	182	2
USA	Ernesto Escobedo	206	3
COL	Daniel Elahi Galán	233	4
USA	Christian Harrison	247	5
DOM	Roberto Cid Subervi	249	6
COL	Santiago Giraldo	252	7
DEN	Mikael Torpegaard	262	8
USA	Thai-Son Kwiatkowski	267	9
ESP	Roberto Ortega Olmedo	289	10
USA	Dennis Novikov	293	11
CRO	Ante Pavić	296	12
USA	Ulises Blanch	297	13
GER	Sebastian Fanselow	302	14
USA	Evan King	306	15
USA	Alexander Sarkissian	308	16

- ^{1} Rankings as of 11 February 2019.

=== Other entrants ===
The following players received wildcards into the singles main draw:

- (Mexico) Lucas Gómez
- (Mexico) Alex Hernández
- (Mexico) Gerardo López Villaseñor
- (Mexico) Luis Patiño
- (Mexico) Manuel Sánchez

The following players received entry into the singles main draw using protected rankings:

- (Argentina) Facundo Mena
- (United States) Daniel Nguyen

The following player received entry into the singles main draw as an alternate:

- (Germany) Johannes Härteis

The following players received entry into the singles main draw using their ITF World Tennis Ranking:

- (Argentina) Matías Franco Descotte
- (Brazil) João Menezes
- (Brazil) João Souza
- (Argentina) Camilo Ugo Carabelli

The following players received entry from the qualifying draw:

- (France) Manuel Guinard
- (Argentina) Gonzalo Villanueva

== Champions ==
=== Singles ===
- (Argentina) Matías Franco Descotte def. (Ecuador) Gonzalo Escobar 6–1, 6–4.

=== Doubles ===
- (Sweden) André Göransson / (Switzerland) Marc-Andrea Hüsler def. (Ecuador) Gonzalo Escobar / (Venezuela) Luis David Martínez 6–3, 3–6, [11–9].
