= 2019 Dutch Open – Doubles =

Doubles
- 2019 Dutch Open

Final
- Champions: (Finland) Harri Heliövaara (Finland) Emil Ruusuvuori
- Runners-up: (Netherlands) Jesper de Jong (Netherlands) Ryan Nijboer
- Score: 6–3, 6–4

Events
Singles	Doubles
- Dutch Open

This was the first edition of the tournament as a Challenger event.

Harri Heliövaara and Emil Ruusuvuori won the title after defeating Jesper de Jong and Ryan Nijboer 6–3, 6–4 in the final.

== Seeds ==
1. (Ecuador) Gonzalo Escobar / (Netherlands) Sem Verbeek (first round)
2. (Czech Republic) Zdeněk Kolář / (Netherlands) Mark Vervoort (first round)
3. (India) Vijay Sundar Prashanth / (India) Vishnu Vardhan (semifinals)
4. (Finland) Harri Heliövaara / (Finland) Emil Ruusuvuori (champions)

== Draw ==
Key

- Q = Qualifier
- WC = Wild card
- LL = Lucky loser
- Alt = Alternate
- ITF = ITF entry
- PR = Protected ranking
- SR = Special ranking
- SE = Special exempt
- JE = Junior exempt
- JR = Junior Accelerator Programme entrant
- CO = College Accelerator Programme entrant
- NG = Next Gen Accelerator Program entrant
- w/o = Walkover
- r = Retired
- d = Defaulted

First round
1	(Ecuador) G Escobar (Netherlands) S Verbeek	6^{2}	3
WC	(Netherlands) J de Jong (Netherlands) Ryan Nijboer	7^{7}	6
(Belarus) U Ignatik (Slovenia) B Rola	6	6
(France) G Blancaneaux (Spain) S Martos Gornés	4	4
3	(India) VS Prashanth (India) V Vardhan	6	6
ITF	(France) C Denolly (Australia) S Puodziunas	0	3
(Germany) D Masur (Germany) M Moraing	6	4	[12]
WC	(Netherlands) G Brouwer (Netherlands) J Sels	3	6	[14]
(France) E Benchetrit (France) J Tatlot	7^{7}	2	[10]
PR	(Croatia) T Draganja (Georgia (country)) A Metreveli	6^{4}	6	[6]
ITF	(Egypt) K-M Maamoun (Peru) A Merino	1	2
4	(Finland) H Heliövaara (Finland) E Ruusuvuori	6	6
(Germany) A Begemann (Germany) J Lenz	6^{4}	6	[10]
(United States) H Johnson (United States) Y Johnson	7^{7}	1	[7]
WC	(Netherlands) S Griekspoor (Netherlands) T van Rijthoven	6	6
2	(Czech Republic) Z Kolář (Netherlands) M Vervoort	3	4

Quarterfinals
WC	(Netherlands) J de Jong (Netherlands) R Nijboer	6	6
(Belarus) U Ignatik (Slovenia) B Rola	0	4
3	(India) VS Prashanth (India) V Vardhan	6^{3}	6	[10]
WC	(Netherlands) G Brouwer (Netherlands) J Sels	7^{7}	3	[2]
(France) E Benchetrit (France) J Tatlot	2	4
4	(Finland) H Heliövaara (Finland) E Ruusuvuori	6	6
(Germany) A Begemann (Germany) J Lenz	6	6
WC	(Netherlands) S Griekspoor (Netherlands) T van Rijthoven	3	3

Semifinals
WC	(Netherlands) J de Jong (Netherlands) R Nijboer	7^{7}	6
3	(India) VS Prashanth (India) V Vardhan	6^{4}	4
4	(Finland) H Heliövaara (Finland) E Ruusuvuori	4	6	[13]
(Germany) A Begemann (Germany) J Lenz	6	1	[11]

Final
WC	(Netherlands) J de Jong (Netherlands) R Nijboer	3	4
4	(Finland) H Heliövaara (Finland) E Ruusuvuori	6	6
