= 2018 Internazionali di Tennis Città di Perugia – Doubles =

Doubles
- 2018 Internazionali di Tennis Città di Perugia

Final
- Champions: (Italy) Daniele Bracciali (Italy) Matteo Donati
- Runners-up: (Bosnia and Herzegovina) Tomislav Brkić (Croatia) Ante Pavić
- Score: 6–3, 3–6, [10–7]

Events
Singles	Doubles
- Internazionali di Tennis Città di Perugia

Salvatore Caruso and Jonathan Eysseric were the defending champions but chose not to defend their title.

Daniele Bracciali and Matteo Donati won the title after defeating Tomislav Brkić and Ante Pavić 6–3, 3–6, [10–7] in the final.

== Seeds ==
1. (Uruguay) Ariel Behar / (Spain) David Vega Hernández (quarterfinals, withdrew)
2. (Croatia) Tomislav Draganja / (Croatia) Ivan Sabanov (first round)
3. (Peru) Sergio Galdós / (Bolivia) Federico Zeballos (first round)
4. (Ecuador) Gonzalo Escobar / (Brazil) Fernando Romboli (first round)

== Draw ==
Key

- Q = Qualifier
- WC = Wild card
- LL = Lucky loser
- Alt = Alternate
- ITF = ITF entry
- PR = Protected ranking
- SR = Special ranking
- SE = Special exempt
- JE = Junior exempt
- JR = Junior Accelerator Programme entrant
- CO = College Accelerator Programme entrant
- NG = Next Gen Accelerator Program entrant
- w/o = Walkover
- r = Retired
- d = Defaulted

First round
1	(Uruguay) A Behar (Spain) D Vega Hernández	6	7^{7}
(Mexico) H Hach Verdugo (Kazakhstan) T Khabibulin	4	6^{4}
WC	(Italy) Riccardo Balzerani (Italy) G Fonio	3	3
PR	(Italy) D Bracciali (Italy) M Donati	6	6
4	(Ecuador) G Escobar (Brazil) F Romboli	6	3	[6]
(Serbia) N Čačić (Switzerland) L Margaroli	2	6	[10]
WC	(Italy) Alessio De Bernardis (Croatia) M Delić	2	6^{2}
(Italy) F Gaio (Italy) A Pellegrino	6	7^{7}
(Serbia) N Milojević (Italy) A Motti	5	2
(Bosnia and Herzegovina) T Brkić (Croatia) A Pavić	7	6
(Venezuela) LD Martínez (Spain) R Ojeda Lara	6	6
3	(Peru) S Galdós (Bolivia) F Zeballos	3	4
WC	(Italy) J Berrettini (Italy) E Dalla Valle	4	6	[10]
(Spain) E López Pérez (Argentina) M Trungelliti	6	3	[8]
PR	(Spain) N Almagro (Spain) B Zapata Miralles	7	7
2	(Croatia) T Draganja (Croatia) I Sabanov	5	5

Quarterfinals
1	(Uruguay) A Behar (Spain) D Vega Hernández
PR	(Italy) D Bracciali (Italy) M Donati	w/o
(Serbia) N Čačić (Switzerland) L Margaroli	4	5
(Italy) F Gaio (Italy) A Pellegrino	6	7
(Bosnia and Herzegovina) T Brkić (Croatia) A Pavić	6	6
(Venezuela) LD Martínez (Spain) R Ojeda Lara	3	4
WC	(Italy) J Berrettini (Italy) E Dalla Valle	w/o
PR	(Spain) N Almagro (Spain) B Zapata Miralles

Semifinals
PR	(Italy) D Bracciali (Italy) M Donati	6	6^{3}	[10]
(Italy) F Gaio (Italy) A Pellegrino	2	7^{7}	[3]
(Bosnia and Herzegovina) T Brkić (Croatia) A Pavić	6	7
WC	(Italy) J Berrettini (Italy) E Dalla Valle	1	5

Final
PR	(Italy) D Bracciali (Italy) M Donati	6	3	[10]
(Bosnia and Herzegovina) T Brkić (Croatia) A Pavić	3	6	[7]
