= 2019 Dutch Open (tennis) =

- Date: 15 – 21 July
- Draw: 48S / 4Q / 16D
- Surface: Clay / outdoor
- Location: Amersfoort, Netherlands

Champions

Singles
- (Germany) Mats Moraing

Doubles
- (Finland) Harri Heliövaara / (Finland) Emil Ruusuvuori
← 2008 ·	Dutch Open (tennis)	· 2021 →

The 2019 Dutch Open, also known by its sponsored name Van Mossel Kia Dutch Open, was a professional tennis tournament played on clay courts. It was the first edition of the Challenger tournament which was part of the 2019 ATP Challenger Tour. It took place in Amersfoort, Netherlands between 15 and 21 July 2019.

== Singles main draw entrants ==
=== Seeds ===
Country	Player	Rank^{1}	Seed
ESP	Pedro Martínez	126	1
BEL	Kimmer Coppejans	144	2
SLO	Blaž Rola	163	3
NED	Tallon Griekspoor	198	4
GER	Mats Moraing	206	5
FRA	Elliot Benchetrit	218	6
EGY	Mohamed Safwat	231	7
ESP	Nicola Kuhn	238	8
CZE	Zdeněk Kolář	242	9
ESP	Daniel Gimeno Traver	244	10
GER	Daniel Masur	249	11
BRA	Thomaz Bellucci	258	12
BLR	Uladzimir Ignatik	261	13
NED	Thiemo de Bakker	265	14
GER	Tobias Kamke	266	15
FRA	Johan Tatlot	279	16

- ^{1} Rankings are as of 1 July 2019.

=== Other entrants ===
The following players received wildcards into the singles main draw:

- (Netherlands) Jesper de Jong
- (Netherlands) Alec Deckers
- (Netherlands) Niels Lootsma
- (Netherlands) Ryan Nijboer
- (Denmark) Holger Rune

The following player received entry into the singles main draw using a protected ranking:

- (Georgia (country)) Aleksandre Metreveli

The following players received entry into the singles main draw using their ITF World Tennis Ranking:

- (France) Corentin Denolly
- (Belgium) Christopher Heyman
- (Egypt) Karim-Mohamed Maamoun
- (Netherlands) Botic van de Zandschulp
- (Netherlands) Tim van Rijthoven

The following players received entry from the qualifying draw:

- (Netherlands) Igor Sijsling
- (Netherlands) Sem Verbeek

== Champions ==
=== Singles ===
- (Germany) Mats Moraing def. (Belgium) Kimmer Coppejans 6–2, 3–6, 6–3.

=== Doubles ===
- (Finland) Harri Heliövaara / (Finland) Emil Ruusuvuori def. (Netherlands) Jesper de Jong / (Netherlands) Ryan Nijboer 6–3, 6–4.
