= 2018 Fergana Challenger – Men's singles =

Men's singles
- 2018 Fergana Challenger

Final
- Champion: (Serbia) Nikola Milojević
- Runner-up: (Spain) Enrique López Pérez
- Score: 6–3, 6–4

Events
Singles	men	women
Doubles	men	women
- Fergana Challenger

Ilya Ivashka was the defending champion but chose not to defend his title.

Nikola Milojević won the title after defeating Enrique López Pérez 6–3, 6–4 in the final.

== Seeds ==
1. (Serbia) Nikola Milojević (champion)
2. (Spain) Enrique López Pérez (final)
3. (Portugal) Gonçalo Oliveira (second round)
4. (South Korea) Lee Duck-hee (second round)
5. (Russia) Ivan Nedelko (second round, withdrew)
6. (Belarus) Egor Gerasimov (semifinals)
7. (Dominican Republic) Roberto Cid Subervi (second round)
8. (Japan) Yosuke Watanuki (quarterfinals)

== Draw ==
Key

- Q = Qualifier
- WC = Wild card
- LL = Lucky loser
- Alt = Alternate
- ITF = ITF entry
- PR = Protected ranking
- SR = Special ranking
- SE = Special exempt
- JE = Junior exempt
- JR = Junior Accelerator Programme entrant
- CO = College Accelerator Programme entrant
- NG = Next Gen Accelerator Program entrant
- w/o = Walkover
- r = Retired
- d = Defaulted

=== Finals ===
Semifinals
1	(Serbia) Nikola Milojević	6	5	6
Q	(India) Saketh Myneni	4	7	0
6	(Belarus) Egor Gerasimov	4	4
2	(Spain) Enrique López Pérez	6	6

Final
1	(Serbia) Nikola Milojević	6	6
2	(Spain) Enrique López Pérez	3	4

=== Top half ===
First round
1	(Serbia) N Milojević	7	6^{10}	6
Q	(Russia) K Kravchuk	5	7^{12}	4
(Russia) E Karlovskiy	6	6
(Brazil) J Menezes	2	2
Q	(Chinese Taipei) T-l Wu	7	7^{7}
(Russia) I Gakhov	5	6^{1}
(Kazakhstan) A Nedovyesov	4	6^{4}
8	(Japan) Yo Watanuki	6	7^{7}
3	(Portugal) G Oliveira	5	6	6
(Russia) T Gabashvili	7	3	3
(Turkey) C İlkel	6	6
(Italy) A Bega	2	2
(Belarus) D Zhyrmont	4	0
Q	(India) S Myneni	6	6
(Sweden) M Eriksson	4	3
7	(Dominican Republic) R Cid Subervi	6	6

Second round
1	(Serbia) N Milojević	6	7
(Russia) E Karlovskiy	3	5
Q	(Chinese Taipei) T-l Wu	7^{7}	2	3
8	(Japan) Yo Watanuki	6^{5}	6	6
3	(Portugal) G Oliveira	3	7^{7}	4
(Turkey) C İlkel	6	6^{5}	6
Q	(India) S Myneni	6	6
7	(Dominican Republic) R Cid Subervi	0	4

Quarterfinals
1	(Serbia) N Milojević	6	6^{9}	6
8	(Japan) Yo Watanuki	1	7^{11}	3
(Turkey) C İlkel	1	7^{7}	4
Q	(India) S Myneni	6	6^{5}	6

Semifinals
1	(Serbia) N Milojević	6	5	6
Q	(India) S Myneni	4	7	0

=== Bottom half ===
First round
6	(Belarus) E Gerasimov	6	6
(Lithuania) L Grigelis	2	3
WC	(Uzbekistan) F Dustov	6	4	6
(Belgium) Y Mertens	4	6	3
WC	(Kazakhstan) D Yevseyev	3	3
(Bosnia and Herzegovina) A Šetkić	6	6
(Japan) Y Takahashi	6^{3}	1
4	(South Korea) D-h Lee	7^{7}	6
5	(Russia) I Nedelko	5	6	7^{7}
WC	(Uzbekistan) S Fayziev	7	3	6^{0}
(New Zealand) R Statham	6	6^{5}	2
Q	(Japan) Shuichi Sekiguchi	1	7^{7}	6
(Spain) R Ortega Olmedo	6^{6}	3
WC	(Uzbekistan) K Sultanov	7^{8}	6
(France) D Guez	0	6	2
2	(Spain) E López Pérez	6	2	6

Second round
6	(Belarus) E Gerasimov	6	7^{7}
WC	(Uzbekistan) F Dustov	3	6^{4}
(Bosnia and Herzegovina) A Šetkić	6	6
4	(South Korea) D-h Lee	2	3
5	(Russia) I Nedelko
Q	(Japan) S Sekiguchi	w/o
WC	(Uzbekistan) K Sultanov	5	6^{3}
2	(Spain) E López Pérez	7	7^{7}

Quarterfinals
6	(Belarus) E Gerasimov	6	7^{7}
(Bosnia and Herzegovina) A Šetkić	3	6^{4}
Q	(Japan) S Sekiguchi	2	0^{r}
2	(Spain) E López Pérez	6	4

Semifinals
6	(Belarus) E Gerasimov	4	4
2	(Spain) E López Pérez	6	6
