= 2019 Morelos Open – Doubles =

Doubles
- 2019 Morelos Open

Final
- Champions: (Sweden) André Göransson (Switzerland) Marc-Andrea Hüsler
- Runners-up: (Ecuador) Gonzalo Escobar (Venezuela) Luis David Martínez
- Score: 6–3, 3–6, [11–9]

Events
Singles	Doubles
- Morelos Open

Roberto Maytín and Fernando Romboli were the defending champions but chose not to defend their title.

André Göransson and Marc-Andrea Hüsler won the title after defeating Gonzalo Escobar and Luis David Martínez 6–3, 3–6, [11–9] in the final.

== Seeds ==
1. (United States) Evan King / (United States) Hunter Reese (first round)
2. (Mexico) Hans Hach Verdugo / (Croatia) Ante Pavić (semifinals)
3. (Ecuador) Gonzalo Escobar / (Venezuela) Luis David Martínez (final)
4. (Sweden) André Göransson / (Switzerland) Marc-Andrea Hüsler (champions)

== Draw ==
Key

- Q = Qualifier
- WC = Wild card
- LL = Lucky loser
- Alt = Alternate
- ITF = ITF entry
- PR = Protected ranking
- SR = Special ranking
- SE = Special exempt
- JE = Junior exempt
- JR = Junior Accelerator Programme entrant
- CO = College Accelerator Programme entrant
- NG = Next Gen Accelerator Program entrant
- w/o = Walkover
- r = Retired
- d = Defaulted

First round
1	(United States) E King (United States) H Reese	7^{7}	3	[4]
(Ecuador) E Gómez (Ecuador) R Quiroz	6^{5}	6	[10]
Alt	(Argentina) F Mena (Serbia) Milan Radojković	6^{4}	1
(Peru) S Galdós (Bolivia) F Zeballos	7^{7}	6
4	(Sweden) A Göransson (Switzerland) M-A Hüsler	6	7
(Argentina) A Collarini (Italy) A Pellegrino	4	5
(Colombia) DE Galán (Colombia) S Giraldo	7^{7}	6
ITF	(Brazil) J Menezes (Brazil) J Souza	6^{1}	3
(Canada) S Diez (Spain) R Ortega Olmedo	6	6
ITF	(Argentina) MF Descotte (Argentina) C Ugo Carabelli	4	4
(Dominican Republic) R Cid Subervi (Serbia) P Krstin
3	(Ecuador) G Escobar (Venezuela) LD Martínez	w/o
(United States) C Harrison (United States) D Novikov	7	7
WC	(Mexico) G López Villaseñor (Mexico) M Sánchez	5	5
WC	(Mexico) L Gómez (United States) T-S Kwiatkowski	2	2
2	(Mexico) H Hach Verdugo (Croatia) A Pavić	6	6

Quarterfinals
(Ecuador) E Gómez (Ecuador) R Quiroz	6	6
(Peru) S Galdós (Bolivia) F Zeballos	3	3
4	(Sweden) A Göransson (Switzerland) M-A Hüsler	6	6
(Colombia) DE Galán (Colombia) S Giraldo	2	3
(Canada) S Diez (Spain) R Ortega Olmedo	3	4
3	(Ecuador) G Escobar (Venezuela) LD Martínez	6	6
(United States) C Harrison (United States) D Novikov	3	5
2	(Mexico) H Hach Verdugo (Croatia) A Pavić	6	7

Semifinals
(Ecuador) E Gómez (Ecuador) R Quiroz	6	4	[3]
4	(Sweden) A Göransson (Switzerland) M-A Hüsler	4	6	[10]
3	(Ecuador) G Escobar (Venezuela) LD Martínez	1	6	[10]
2	(Mexico) H Hach Verdugo (Croatia) A Pavić	6	3	[8]

Final
4	(Sweden) A Göransson (Switzerland) M-A Hüsler	6	3	[11]
3	(Ecuador) G Escobar (Venezuela) LD Martínez	3	6	[9]
