= 2018 Fergana Challenger – Men's doubles =

Men's doubles
- 2018 Fergana Challenger

Final
- Champions: (Russia) Ivan Gakhov (Russia) Alexander Pavlioutchenkov
- Runners-up: (India) Saketh Myneni (India) Vijay Sundar Prashanth
- Score: 6–4, 6–4

Events
Singles	men	women
Doubles	men	women
- Fergana Challenger

Sriram Balaji and Vishnu Vardhan were the defending champions but chose not to defend their title.

Ivan Gakhov and Alexander Pavlioutchenkov won the title after defeating Saketh Myneni and Vijay Sundar Prashanth 6–4, 6–4 in the final.

== Seeds ==
1. (Spain) Gerard Granollers / (Spain) Enrique López Pérez (first round)
2. (Kazakhstan) Timur Khabibulin / (Ukraine) Vladyslav Manafov (semifinals)
3. (Portugal) Gonçalo Oliveira / (Spain) Roberto Ortega Olmedo (withdrew)
4. (Russia) Mikhail Elgin / (Russia) Evgeny Tyurnev (first round)

== Draw ==
Key

- Q = Qualifier
- WC = Wild card
- LL = Lucky loser
- Alt = Alternate
- ITF = ITF entry
- PR = Protected ranking
- SR = Special ranking
- SE = Special exempt
- JE = Junior exempt
- JR = Junior Accelerator Programme entrant
- CO = College Accelerator Programme entrant
- NG = Next Gen Accelerator Program entrant
- w/o = Walkover
- r = Retired
- d = Defaulted

First round
1	(Spain) G Granollers (Spain) E López Pérez	5	5
(India) S Myneni (India) VS Prashanth	7	7
(Serbia) N Milojević (Bosnia and Herzegovina) A Šetkić	3	6	[10]
(Turkey) T Altuna (Turkey) A Çelikibilek	6	2	[6]
Alt	(Kazakhstan) Sagadat Ayap (Kazakhstan) G Lomakin	3
(France) D Guez (Japan) Yo Watanuki	2^{r}
(Kazakhstan) A Nedovyesov (Belarus) Y Shyla	6	3	[5]
(Dominican Republic) R Cid Subervi (New Zealand) R Statham	4	6	[10]
(Lithuania) L Grigelis (Russia) I Nedelko	7^{7}	6^{3}	[7]
(India) A Kadhe (United States) A Lawson	6^{4}	7^{7}	[10]
(Russia) I Gakhov (Russia) A Pavlioutchenkov	7	3	[10]
4	(Russia) M Elgin (Russia) E Tyurnev	5	6	[7]
WC	(Uzbekistan) Amal Sultanbekov (Uzbekistan) Azizkhon Turgunov	6	3	[2]
WC	(Uzbekistan) F Dustov (Uzbekistan) Shonigmatjon Shofayziyev	2	6	[10]
WC	(Uzbekistan) S Fayziev (Uzbekistan) K Sultanov	4	4
2	(Kazakhstan) T Khabibulin (Ukraine) V Manafov	6	6

Quarterfinals
(India) S Myneni (India) VS Prashanth	6	6
(Serbia) N Milojević (Bosnia and Herzegovina) A Šetkić	1	3
Alt	(Kazakhstan) S Ayap (Kazakhstan) G Lomakin	5	4
(Dominican Republic) R Cid Subervi (New Zealand) R Statham	7	6
(India) A Kadhe (United States) A Lawson	5	4
(Russia) I Gakhov (Russia) A Pavlioutchenkov	7	6
WC	(Uzbekistan) F Dustov (Uzbekistan) S Shofayziyev	2	0
2	(Kazakhstan) T Khabibulin (Ukraine) V Manafov	6	6

Semifinals
(India) S Myneni (India) VS Prashanth	7^{7}	7^{7}
(Dominican Republic) R Cid Subervi (New Zealand) R Statham	6^{5}	6^{1}
(Russia) I Gakhov (Russia) A Pavlioutchenkov	6	4	[12]
2	(Kazakhstan) T Khabibulin (Ukraine) V Manafov	4	6	[10]

Final
(India) S Myneni (India) VS Prashanth	4	4
(Russia) I Gakhov (Russia) A Pavlioutchenkov	6	6
