= 2018 Internazionali di Tennis Città di Perugia =

- Date: 10–15 July
- Edition: 4th
- Draw: 32S / 16D
- Surface: Clay
- Location: Perugia, Italy

Champions

Singles
- (United States) Ulises Blanch

Doubles
- (Italy) Daniele Bracciali / (Italy) Matteo Donati
- Internazionali di Tennis Città di Perugia

The 2018 Internazionali di Tennis Città di Perugia was a professional tennis tournament played on clay courts. It was the fourth edition of the tournament which was part of the 2018 ATP Challenger Tour. It took place in Perugia, Italy between 10 and 15 July 2018.

== Singles main-draw entrants ==
=== Seeds ===
Country	Player	Rank^{1}	Seed
AUT	Gerald Melzer	106	1
ESP	Pablo Andújar	123	2
~~SLO~~	~~Blaž Kavčič~~	~~157~~	~~3~~
ESP	Enrique López Pérez	159	4
SRB	Nikola Milojević	162	5
ITA	Matteo Donati	176	6
HUN	Attila Balázs	182	7
ESP	Carlos Taberner	185	8
FRA	Kenny de Schepper	187	9

- ^{1} Rankings are as of 2 July 2018.

=== Other entrants ===
The following players received wildcards into the singles main draw:

- (Spain) Nicolás Almagro
- (Spain) Pablo Andújar
- (Italy) Jacopo Berrettini
- (Italy) Enrico Dalla Valle

The following players received entry from the qualifying draw:

- (Ecuador) Gonzalo Escobar
- (Croatia) Ante Pavić
- (Colombia) Cristian Rodríguez
- (Spain) Pol Toledo Bagué

The following player received entry as a lucky loser:

- (United States) Ulises Blanch

== Champions ==
=== Singles ===
- (United States) Ulises Blanch def. (Italy) Gianluigi Quinzi 7–5, 6–2.

=== Doubles ===
- (Italy) Daniele Bracciali / (Italy) Matteo Donati def. (Bosnia and Herzegovina) Tomislav Brkić / (Croatia) Ante Pavić 6–3, 3–6, [10–7].
