= Ann Arbor Challenger =

- 2020 Ann Arbor Challenger

ATP Challenger Tour
- Event name: Ann Arbor Challenger
- Location: Ann Arbor, Michigan, United States
- Venue: University of Michigan Varsity Tennis Center
- Category: ATP Challenger Tour
- Surface: Hard (indoor)
- Draw: 48S/4Q/16D

The Ann Arbor Challenger is a professional tennis tournament played on indoor hard courts. It is currently part of the ATP Challenger Tour. It is held annually in Ann Arbor, Michigan, United States since 2020.

== Past finals ==
=== Singles ===
Year	Champion	Runner-up	Score
2020	(United States) Ulises Blanch	(Dominican Republic) Roberto Cid Subervi	3–6, 6–4, 6–2

=== Doubles ===
Year	Champions	Runners-up	Score
2020	(United States) Robert Galloway (Mexico) Hans Hach Verdugo	(Colombia) Nicolás Barrientos (Colombia) Alejandro Gómez	4–6, 6–4, [10–8]
