= Ulises Blanch =

American tennis player

- Country (sports): United States
- Residence: Orlando, Florida, USA
- Born: March 25, 1998 (age 28) San Juan, Puerto Rico
- Height: 6 ft 2 in (188 cm)
- Turned pro: 2016
- Retired: January 2025 (last match played)
- Plays: Right-handed (two handed-backhand)
- Prize money: US $349,276

Singles
- Career record: 0–1
- Career titles: 0
- Highest ranking: No. 236 (12 October 2020)

Grand Slam singles results
- Australian Open: Q2 (2021)
- French Open: Q3 (2020)
- US Open: 1R (2020)

Doubles
- Career record: 0–0
- Career titles: 0
- Highest ranking: No. 423 (20 May 2019)

Ulises Blanch (born March 25, 1998) is an American former professional tennis player. He has a career high singles ranking of No. 236 achieved on 12 October 2020 and a doubles ranking of No. 423 achieved on 20 May 2019.

== Career ==
=== Juniors ===
As a junior, Blanch reached a career high ranking of World No. 2 achieved on 23 May 2016. His junior highlights include a final appearance at the Trofeo Bonfiglio, a GA event in Milan, Italy as well as winning a few Grade 1 level events in Brazil and Australia.

=== Professional ===
In July 2018, he won the Perugia Challenger tournament in Italy, as a lucky loser, defeating Italian Gianluigi Quinzi in the final 7–5, 6–2.

A year and a half later, he won the 2020 Ann Arbor Challenger in Michigan, USA defeating Roberto Cid Subervi of the Dominican Republic 3–6, 6–4, 6–2 to capture the championship. Ranked No. 419, he was the lowest ranked champion in 2020.

Blanch made his ATP Tour main draw debut at the 2020 US Open where he was granted a direct entry into the singles main draw via wildcard. He was defeated in the first round in a five-set thrilling match despite taking a two sets to love lead, by Chilean player Cristian Garín 6–4, 7–5, 4–6, 4–6, 2–6.

== Personal life ==
Blanch was born in San Juan, Puerto Rico, but his family moved to Seattle when he was just 3 days old. Due to his father's job, Blanch has lived in multiple countries such as China, India, Thailand and Argentina. Ulises has two brothers and one sister Dali, Darwin, and Krystal Blanch. All four of them play tennis and have won numerous tournaments. He is of Spanish descent through his father.

His last match on the tour was in January 2025 and he has stated on his LinkedIn profile that he has retired due to injuries.

== ATP Challenger and ITF Tour finals ==
=== Singles: 7 (4 titles, 3 runner-ups) ===
Legend ATP Challenger Tour (2–0) ITF Futures/WTT (2–3)	Finals by surface Hard (3–1) Clay (1–2)

Result	W–L	Date	Tournament	Tier	Surface	Opponent	Score
Win	1–0	Jul 2018	Internazionali Città di Perugia, Italy	Challenger	Clay	(Italy) Gianluigi Quinzi	7–5, 6–2
Win	2–0	Jan 2020	Ann Arbor Challenger, USA	Challenger	Hard (i)	(Dominican Republic) Roberto Cid Subervi	3–6, 6–4, 6–2

Result	W–L	Date	Tournament	Tier	Surface	Opponent	Score
Win	1–0	Sep 2017	Canada F5, Calgary	Futures	Hard	(Canada) Filip Peliwo	6–4 ret.
Loss	1–1	Feb 2016	USA F37, Pensacola	Futures	Clay	(Ecuador) Emilio Gómez	6–3, 5–7, 1–6
Loss	1–2	Jul 2018	France F11, Montauban	Futures	Clay	(Argentina) Juan Pablo Ficovich	7–6^{(7–5)}, 3–6, 3–6
Loss	1–3	Aug 2019	M25 Memphis, USA	WTT	Hard	(Dominican Republic) Roberto Cid Subervi	6–3, 3–6, 6–7^{(8–10)}
Win	2–3	Feb 2024	M15 Monastir, Tunisia	WTT	Hard	(Croatia) Matej Dodig	0–6, 6–3, 6–4

=== Doubles: 3 (2 titles, 1 runner-up) ===
Legend ITF Futures (2–1)	Finals by surface Hard (0–0) Clay (2–1) Grass (0–0) Carpet (0–0)

Result	W–L	Date	Tournament	Tier	Surface	Partner	Opponents	Score
Loss	0–1	May 2018	Italy F11, Napoli	Futures	Clay	(Argentina) Franco Capalbo	(Argentina) Patricio Heras (Argentina) Franco Agamenone	3–6, 4–6
Win	1–1	Jun 2018	France F10, Toulouse	Futures	Clay	(Argentina) Juan Pablo Ficovich	(France) Matteo Martineau (France) Antoine Cornut-Chauvinc	6–2, 6–2
Win	2–1	Jul 2018	France F11, Montauban	Futures	Clay	(France) Ugo Humbert	(Argentina) Patricio Heras (Argentina) Gonzalo Villanueva	6–3, 3–6, [10–6]
