= Emil Ruusuvuori =

Finnish tennis player (born 1999)

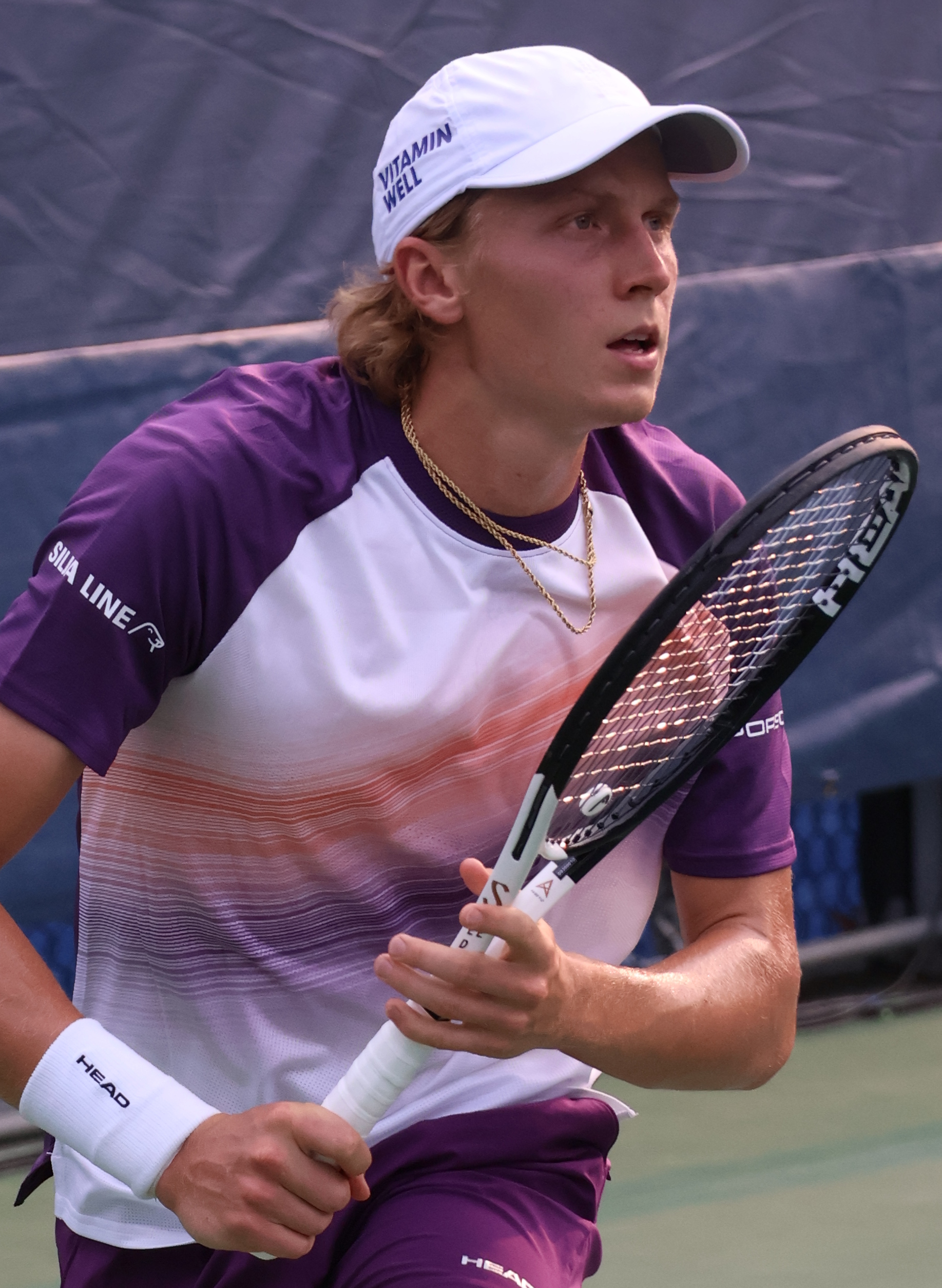
- Ruusuvuori at the 2023 Washington Open
- Full name: Emil Ruusuvuori
- Country (sports): Finland
- Residence: Helsinki, Finland
- Born: 2 April 1999 (age 27) Helsinki, Finland
- Height: 1.88 m (6 ft 2 in)
- Turned pro: 2018
- Plays: Right-handed (two-handed backhand)
- Coach: Federico Ricci (2013-)
- Prize money: US $4,982,765

Singles
- Career record: 112–105 (at ATP Tour level, Grand Slam level, and in Davis Cup)
- Career titles: 0
- Highest ranking: No. 37 (3 April 2023)

Grand Slam singles results
- Australian Open: 2R (2021, 2023, 2024)
- French Open: 2R (2022, 2023)
- Wimbledon: 3R (2024)
- US Open: 2R (2020, 2021)

Doubles
- Career record: 19–25
- Career titles: 0
- Highest ranking: No. 179 (2 May 2022)

Grand Slam doubles results
- Australian Open: 1R (2021, 2023)
- French Open: 2R (2021)
- US Open: 3R (2021)

Grand Slam mixed doubles results
- Wimbledon: 1R (2023)

Emil Ruusuvuori (Finnish pronunciation: [ˈeːmil ˈruːsuˌʋuo̯ri]; born 2 April 1999) is a Finnish inactive professional tennis player. He reached a career high ATP singles ranking of World No. 37 on 3 April 2023. He is currently the No. 2 Finnish singles tennis player. He has a career-high doubles ranking of World No. 179 achieved on 2 May 2022.

As a junior, Ruusuvuori was ranked as high as World No. 4 in the ITF combined junior rankings. In 2017, he reached the singles quarterfinals of the Australian Open boys' singles, the singles semifinals of the US Open boys' singles, and won the ITF Junior Masters.

Ruusuvuori has also represented Finland in the Davis Cup, where he has a win–loss record of 5–5. In September 2019, he defeated reigning world number 5 and 2-time Roland Garros finalist Dominic Thiem in straight sets in a Davis Cup singles rubber.

== Early life ==
Emil Ruusuvuori was born in Töölö, Helsinki, to Jari Laakkonen and Eva Ruusuvuori. He has an older sister, Aino, and a younger brother, Elias. He attended Pohjois-Haaga Coeducational School in Haaga.

He began playing tennis at the age of five. He was coached by Mika Muilu until the age of 11, and trained at the Jarkko Nieminen Tennis Academy until its closure in 2017.

== Junior career ==
=== 2013–2016: Early junior career ===
At the age of 14, nine years after he first began playing tennis, Ruusuvuori entered his first ITF Juniors tournament, the Nokia Junior Cup, in 2013. 2014 offered his first success, reaching two singles finals, two doubles finals, and winning two doubles titles. He saw additional success in 2015, including one final in both singles and doubles as well as another doubles title. Ruusuvuori made his singles breakthrough in 2016, winning four events in total. He continued his doubles success as well, winning three events and reaching the finals of two more.

=== 2017: Junior Grand Slam debut and first ITF Futures title ===
Ruusuvuori started his year in January at the AGL Loy Yang Traralgon Junior International, reaching the semifinals in both the doubles, with partner Michael Vrbenský of the Czech Republic, and singles. He then entered the Australian Open, his debut grand slam event, participating in both the boys' singles and doubles. In singles, he won his first three matches in straight sets before losing to Corentin Moutet in the quarterfinals. Partnering again with Vrbensky, he lost in the first round of the doubles.

February saw Ruusuvuori compete in his first Davis Cup match, losing to Nikoloz Basilashvili of Georgia in straight sets.

In March, he competed in the Croatia F3 Futures event in Umag, losing in the first round of singles qualifying. Ruusuvuori then returned to the junior tour, competing in the 33. Perin Memorial, where he reached the finals in singles, losing to Alen Avidzba of Russia in two sets.

After not seeing competition in April 2017, Ruusuvuori returned in May, participating in the Italy F13 Futures event, where he lost in the third round of singles qualifying. He then competed in the 58th Trofeo Bonfiglio junior event, losing in the first round of both singles and doubles.

In June, he competed further in both Juniors and Futures events. He competed in both the boys' singles and doubles at the French Open. In singles, he lost in the first round, again losing to Moutet. Along with partner Rudolf Molleker of Germany, Ruusuvuori was seeded fifth in doubles. Together they reached the quarterfinals, losing to eventual finalists Vasil Kirkov and Danny Thomas of the United States. He then competed in the Portugal F9 Futures, winning three rounds in singles qualifying before reaching the quarterfinals.

In July, Ruusuvuori competed in two events on the junior tour. Competing at the Nike Junior International in Roehampton, he reached the semifinals in singles and first round in doubles, again partnering Molleker. At Wimbledon, he faced Molleker in the first round of singles, retiring in the second set.

He returned to competition in August at Les Internationaux de Tennis Junior Banque Nationale du Canada, losing to Brian Shi of the United States in the second round.

Competing as an unseeded player at the 2017 US Open in September, Ruusuvuori saw his best singles Grand Slam result of the year, reaching the semifinals. En route, he defeated two seeded players: 13th seed Sebastian Korda of the United States in the second round and 10th seed Sebastián Báez of Argentina in the quarterfinals. In the semifinals, Ruusuvuori lost to eventual champion Wu Yibing of China in three sets, 6–4, 3–6, 6–7^{(4)}, after having two match points. With Simon Carr of Ireland, he reached the second round in doubles.

October saw further Futures competition as well as the final junior competition of the year for Ruusuvuori. At the Sweden F4 Futures, he again reached the singles quarterfinals after passing through qualifying, losing to eventual champion Tallon Griekspoor of the Netherlands. At the ITF Junior Masters, he finished with a 2–1 record in round robin competition, winning matches against Jurij Rodionov of Austria and Marko Miladinović of Serbia while losing to Wu for the second time that year. Reaching the final, he again faced Wu, this time exacting revenge to come out on top in three sets, 3–6, 6–1, 7–6^{(4)}, and claim the title.

In November, Ruusuvuori competed in two Futures events: Estonia F4 in Pärnu and Finland F4 in Helsinki. As a wildcard entry in Pärnu, he defeated third seed Vladimir Ivanov of Estonia en route to his third quarterfinal showing of the year.

On the ITF Pro Circuit, Ruusuvuori won his first Futures championship at the Finland F4 event. Again as a wildcard entry, the competition in Helsinki saw Ruusuvori's best singles result to date. Defeating the 8th, 4th, and 1st seeds en route to the final, Ruusuvuori then defeated 3rd seeded Evgeny Karlovskiy of Russia in three sets, 4–6, 6–0, 6–1, to win his first Futures singles event of his career. In doubles, he and fellow Finnish player Patrik Niklas-Salminen reached the quarterfinals.

Through a successful 2017, Ruusuvuori reached a high Junior ranking of World No. 4 in the ITF combined junior rankings and finished the year ranked No. 665 in the ATP singles rankings. He finished his junior career with a win–loss record of 99–44.

Junior Grand Slam results – Singles: Australian Open: QF (2017)
French Open: 1R (2017)
Wimbledon: 1R (2017)
US Open: SF (2017)

== Professional career ==
=== 2018: First Challenger main draw ===
Ruusuvuori's year began at the Hong Kong F6 Futures, held the first week of January. Seeded 7th in singles, he reached the quarterfinals before losing to 4th seeded Shintaro Imai of Japan in two sets. The next week, Ruusuvuori reached his first Challenger event main draw, coming through qualifying to reach the second round of the Bangkok Challenger.

Ruusuvuori again represented his home country in the Davis Cup in February, going 1–1 in singles to help Finland advance over Tunisia 3–2.

=== 2019: Raise in rankings, Top 125 debut, First top 5 win ===
Ruusuvuori drastically improved his ATP ranking in 2019 as he had risen from 385 at the beginning of the year to 123 at the end. Ruusuvuori also made and won his first challenger final in April 2019 and would go on to win 3 of 4 more challenger finals.

In September 2019, Ruusuvuori stunned World No. 5 and 2-time French Open finalist Dominic Thiem in straight sets in a Davis Cup match against Austria for his first top-10 win.

=== 2020: Top 100 & Grand Slam debut, First ATP Tour semifinal ===
Ranked at No. 100, Ruusuvuori made his Masters debut and reached the second round at the 2020 Western & Southern Open in Cincinnati. He subsequently reached the second round of a Grand Slam for the first time in his career at the 2020 US Open (tennis), where he defeated Aljaž Bedene in the first round, to set up a clash with Casper Ruud in the second round. He exited the tournament after retiring in the third set against Ruud.

Ruusuvuori reached the semifinals in Nur-Sultan, where he lost to Adrian Mannarino.

=== 2021: Top 70 debut, Miami Masters fourth round ===
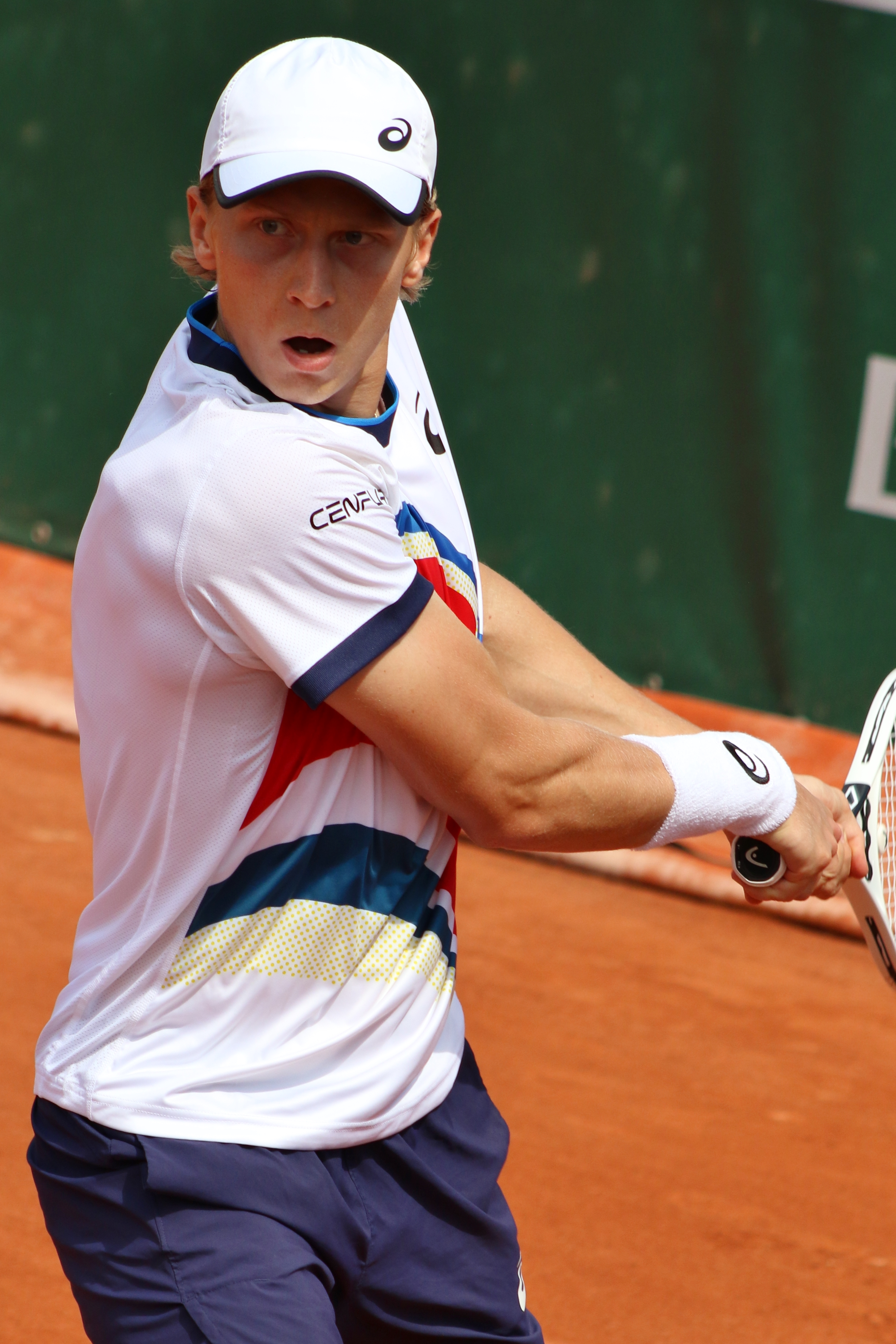
Ruusuvuori at the 2021 French Open

In March, Ruusuvuori defeated wildcard Carlos Alcaraz and then scored a major upset over World No. 7 Alexander Zverev at the Miami Open for a second top-10 victory in his career to reach the third round. He reached the fourth round where he lost to Jannik Sinner, his best career result at a Masters 1000 event.

Ruusuvuori reached the semifinals of the 2021 Atlanta Open, beating Mackenzie McDonald, seventh seed Benoît Paire, and third seed Cameron Norrie before losing to Brandon Nakashima. He played Prajnesh Gunneswaran in the 2021 Citi Open, winning, before bowing out to Sinner in the second round. As a result, he entered the top 70 at a career-high of World No. 69 on 2 August 2021.

At the 2021 Winston-Salem Open, Ruusuvuori reached his third quarterfinal of the year defeating again twelfth seeded Benoît Paire, and his third tour-level semifinal in his career defeating fourteenth seed Richard Gasquet along the way. He lost to Ilya Ivashka.

=== 2022: First ATP Tour final, top 40 debut ===
Ruusuvuori started the year at the Melbourne Summer Set 1. He reached the semifinals where he lost to top seed, world No. 6, and eventual champion, Rafael Nadal, in two close sets. At the Australian Open, he lost in the first round to world No. 9, Félix Auger-Aliassime, in a five-set thriller, despite leading 2 sets to 1, and bageling Auger-Aliassime in the 2nd set.

Seeded sixth at the Maharashtra Open in Pune, Ruusuvuori reached his first career ATP final by defeating Egor Gerasimov, qualifier Vít Kopřiva, fourth seed and defending champion, Jiří Veselý, and Kamil Majchrzak. He lost to João Sousa in the final in three sets. The week of February 14 saw him making his debut at the Qatar ExxonMobil Open in Doha. He beat David Goffin in his first-round match. He was defeated in the second round by sixth seed and world No. 27, Karen Khachanov.

He reached a career-high of No. 63 on 25 April after successful second rounds showings at the 2022 BNP Paribas Open, the 2022 Miami Open, the 2022 Monte-Carlo Masters and a third round at the 2022 Barcelona Open Banc Sabadell. He reached the quarterfinals at the 2022 BMW Open and moved to the top 60 at World No. 59 on 2 May 2022.

At the 2022 Italian Open, he qualified for the main draw as a lucky loser replacing seventh seed Carlos Alcaraz, where he lost to Cristian Garín in the second round, having received a first round bye. Ruusuvuori won his first match at the 2022 French Open over Ugo Humbert in five sets. In the second round, he lost to the 8th seed, Casper Ruud, in straight sets.

He reached the top 50 at world No. 48 in the rankings after the 2022 Queen's Club Championships where he reached the quarterfinals as a qualifier defeating wildcard Jack Draper.

He made his debut at the 2022 Wimbledon Championships and won his first match at this Major defeating Yoshihito Nishioka.

At the 2022 Citi Open in Washington he upset world No. 11 and second seed Hubert Hurkacz in the second round. He lost in the round of 16 to Mikael Ymer. At the 2022 National Bank Open in Montreal, he defeated former world No. 3 Stan Wawrinka in the first round but lost to Hurkacz in the second. In Stockholm he reached the semifinals defeating previous year semifinalist and third seed Frances Tiafoe. He lost to wildcard top seed Stefanos Tsitsipas. He moved 9 positions up to No. 43. At the 2022 Erste Bank Open in Vienna he defeated Metz champion Lorenzo Sonego, moving closer to the top 40 in the rankings at No. 41 on 31 October 2022.

He finished the year ranked No. 40 in the World.

=== 2023: First Masters quarterfinal in Miami ===
Ruusuvuori started his 2023 season at the Maharashtra Open. Seeded 3rd and last year finalist, he lost in the second round to eventual finalist Benjamin Bonzi. At the Adelaide International 2, he was defeated in the first round by qualifier Mikael Ymer. At the Australian Open, he lost in the second round to fifth seed and world No. 6, Andrey Rublev, in four sets.

Representing Finland during the Davis Cup tie against Argentina, Ruusuvuori won both matches that he played beating Pedro Cachin and Facundo Bagnis. In the end, Finland won the tie 3–1 over Argentina to qualify for the Davis Cup Finals. Seeded seventh at the Open Sud de France, he lost his second-round match to eventual finalist Maxime Cressy. In Rotterdam, he was defeated in the first round by top seed, world No. 3, and last year finalist, Stefanos Tsitsipas. At the Qatar ExxonMobil Open, he beat sixth seed and world No. 29, Dan Evans, in the first round. He lost in the second round to Jiří Lehečka. At the Dubai Championships, he fell in the first round to qualifier Christopher O'Connell. Competing at the Indian Wells Masters, he beat 22nd seed and world No. 27, Roberto Bautista Agut, in the second round. He lost in the third round to 12th seed and world No. 14, Alexander Zverev. Seeded eighth at the Arizona Classic, he was defeated in the second round by Quentin Halys. At the Miami Open, he again beat 22nd seed, Roberto Bautista Agut, in the second round to reach back to back Masters third rounds in two weeks and only for a second time at this tournament. He defeated Taro Daniel in the third round to reach the fourth round for the second time at this Masters tournament. He went one step further and defeated 26th seed, Botic van de Zandschulp, in the fourth round, to reach his first Master quarterfinal in his career. He lost his quarterfinal match to 10th seed, world No. 11, 2021 finalist, and eventual finalist, Jannik Sinner. As a result, he moved to a new career high in the top 40 at No. 37 on 3 April 2023.

Ruusuvuori started his clay-court season at the Monte-Carlo Masters. He fell in the final round of qualifying to Jan-Lennard Struff. However, due to Frances Tiafoe withdrawing from the tournament after winning the U.S. Men's Clay Court Championships in Houston, Ruusuvuori earned a lucky loser spot into the main draw. He lost in the first round to Jiří Lehečka. At the Barcelona Open, he upset fifth seed and world No. 12, Frances Tiafoe, in the second round in three sets. He was defeated in the third round by 10th seed Alejandro Davidovich Fokina. At the Madrid Open, he lost in the second round to top seed, world No. 2, defending champion, and eventual champion, Carlos Alcaraz, in three sets. In Rome, he was beaten in the second round by third seed and eventual champion, Daniil Medvedev. At the French Open, he lost in the second round to 28th seed and world No. 29, Grigor Dimitrov, in straight sets.

Ruusuvuori started his grass-court season at the Libéma Open. He beat seventh seed, Ugo Humbert, in the second round. In the quarterfinals, he earned his third Top 10 win by upsetting second seed and world No. 9, Jannik Sinner. He lost in his semifinal match to sixth seed, home crowd favorite and eventual champion, Tallon Griekspoor.

At the 2023 Western & Southern Open he defeated sixth seed Andrey Rublev, his fourth top-10 win, and reached the third round. He skipped the US Open and the Asian swing. In Stockholm he defeated qualifier Benjamin Hassan but lost to third seed Tallon Griekspoor and fell out of the top 60.

=== 2024–2025: ATP final, 100th win, Major third round, early season end, hiatus ===
He reached his second career final in Hong Kong defeating Benjamin Bonzi, second seed Karen Khachanov, Pavel Kotov and Sebastian Ofner. As a result, he returned to the top 50 on 8 January 2024.

At the 2024 Australian Open he recorded his 100th win defeating wildcard Patrick Kypson becoming only the second player from Finland to reach this milestone after Jarkko Nieminen. At the 2024 ABN AMRO Open in Rotterdam, he reached the quarterfinals defeating seventh seed Ugo Humbert and Jan-Lennard Struff.

At the 2024 Wimbledon Championships he reached the third round of a Major for the first time with wins over Mackenzie McDonald and 11th seed Stefanos Tsitsipas. He became the third Finnish player to make the third round at the All England Club, joining Pekka Säilä and Jarkko Nieminen.

He ended his season earlier after pulling out of the 2024 US Open.

== ATP career finals ==
=== Singles: 2 (2 runner-ups) ===
Legend Grand Slam (0-0) ATP Masters 1000 (0-0) ATP 500 Series (0-0) ATP 250 Series (0–2)	Titles by surface Hard (0–2) Clay (0–0) Grass (0–0)	Titles by setting Outdoor (0–2) Indoor (0–0)

Result	W–L	Date	Tournament	Tier	Surface	Opponent	Score
Loss	0–1	Feb 2022	Maharashtra Open, India	250 Series	Hard	(Portugal) João Sousa	6–7^{(9–11)}, 6–4, 1–6
Loss	0–2	Jan 2024	Hong Kong Open, China SAR	250 Series	Hard	Andrey Rublev	4–6, 4–6

=== Doubles: 1 (1 runner-up) ===
Legend Grand Slam (0-0) ATP Masters 1000 (0-0) ATP 500 Series (0-0) ATP 250 Series (0–1)	Titles by surface Hard (0–1) Clay (0–0) Grass (0–0)	Titles by setting Outdoor (0–0) Indoor (0–1)

Result	W–L	Date	Tournament	Tier	Surface	Partner	Opponents	Score
Loss	0–1	Feb 2024	Open 13, France	250 series	Hard (i)	(Finland) Patrik Niklas-Salminen	(Czech Republic) Tomáš Macháč (China) Zhang Zhizhen	3–6, 4–6

== Performance timeline ==
Key
W	F	SF	QF	#R	RR	Q#	P#	DNQ	A	Z#	PO	G	S	B	NMS	NTI	P	NH

(W) winner; (F) finalist; (SF) semifinalist; (QF) quarterfinalist; (#R) rounds 4, 3, 2, 1; (RR) round-robin stage; (Q#) qualification round; (P#) preliminary round; (DNQ) did not qualify; (A) absent; (Z#) Davis/Fed Cup Zonal Group (with number indication) or (PO) play-off; (G) gold, (S) silver or (B) bronze Olympic/Paralympic medal; (NMS) not a Masters tournament; (NTI) not a Tier I tournament; (P) postponed; (NH) not held; (SR) strike rate (events won / competed); (W–L) win–loss record.
To avoid confusion and double counting, these charts are updated at the conclusion of a tournament or when the player's participation has ended.

=== Singles ===
Current through the 2025 European Open.

Tournament	2017	2018	2019	2020	2021	2022	2023	2024	2025	SR	W–L	Win%
Grand Slam tournaments
Australian Open	A	A	A	Q2	2R	1R	2R	2R	A	0 / 4	3–4	43%
French Open	A	A	A	1R	1R	2R	2R	1R	A	0 / 5	2–5	29%
Wimbledon	A	A	A	NH	1R	2R	1R	3R	A	0 / 4	3–4	43%
US Open	A	A	A	2R	2R	1R	A	A	1R	0 / 4	2–4	33%
Win–loss	0–0	0–0	0–0	1–2	2–4	2–4	2–3	3–3	0–1	0 / 17	10–17	37%
ATP Masters 1000
Indian Wells Masters	A	A	A	NH	2R	2R	3R	1R	A	0 / 4	4–4	50%
Miami Open	A	A	A	NH	4R	2R	QF	1R	A	0 / 4	8–4	67%
Monte-Carlo Masters	A	A	A	NH	A	2R	1R	A	A	0 / 2	1–2	33%
Madrid Open	A	A	A	NH	Q1	A	2R	1R	A	0 / 2	1–2	33%
Italian Open	A	A	A	A	A	2R	2R	1R	A	0 / 3	1–3	25%
Canadian Open	A	A	A	NH	1R	2R	1R	A	A	0 / 3	1–3	25%
Cincinnati Masters	A	A	A	2R	Q1	2R	3R	A	A	0 / 3	4–3	57%
Shanghai Masters	A	A	A	NH			A	A	A	0 / 0	0–0	–
Paris Masters	A	A	A	A	A	Q1	Q1	A	A	0 / 0	0–0	–
Win–loss	0–0	0–0	0–0	1–1	4–3	5–6	10–6	0–4	0–0	0 / 21	20–21	49%
National representation
Summer Olympics	NH				A	NH		A	NH	0 / 0	0–0	–
Davis Cup	Z2	Z2	Z1	A	WG I	WG I	SF	RR	WG I	0 / 2	15–8	65%
Career statistics
Tournaments	0	0	0	9	22	28	25	14	2	Career total: 100		
Overall win–loss	0–1	3–3	2–0	6–9	23–22	35–29	26–25	16–13	1–3	0 / 100	112–105	52%
Year-end ranking	670	385	123	86	95	40	69	95	549	$4,336,285		

== ATP Challenger and ITF Tour Finals ==
=== Singles: 12 (10 titles, 2 runner-up) ===
Legend ATP Challenger (4–2) ITF Futures/World Tennis Tour (6–0)	Finals by surface Hard (10–1) Clay (0–1)

Result	W–L	Date	Tournament	Tier	Surface	Opponent	Score
Win	1–0	Nov 2017	Finland F4, Helsinki	Futures	Hard (i)	(Russia) Evgeny Karlovskiy	4–6, 6–0, 6–1
Win	2–0	Jun 2018	Spain F13, Santa Margarida de Montbui	Futures	Hard	(Russia) Alexander Zhurbin	6–3, 6–3
Win	3–0	Sep 2018	Italy F25, Piombino	Futures	Hard	(Germany) Sami Reinwein	6–1, 6–2
Win	4–0	Oct 2018	Sweden F5, Falun	Futures	Hard (i)	(Finland) Patrik Niklas-Salminen	6–4, 6–4
Win	5–0	Mar 2019	M15 Oslo, Norway	World Tennis Tour	Hard (i)	(Netherlands) Mick Veldheer	6–1, 6–4
Win	6–0	Apr 2019	M25 Sunderland, Great Britain	World Tennis Tour	Hard (i)	(Spain) Andrés Artuñedo	6–2, 7–5
Win	1–0	Jun 2019	Fergana, Uzbekistan	Challenger	Hard	(Dominican Republic) Roberto Cid Subervi	6–3, 6–2
Loss	1–1	Aug 2019	Augsburg, Germany	Challenger	Clay	(Germany) Yannick Hanfmann	6–2, 4–6, 5–7
Win	2–1	Sep 2019	Manacor, Spain	Challenger	Hard	(Italy) Matteo Viola	6–0, 6–1
Win	3–1	Sep 2019	Glasgow, United Kingdom	Challenger	Hard (i)	(France) Alexandre Müller	6–3, 6–1
Win	4–1	Nov 2019	Helsinki, Finland	Challenger	Hard (i)	(Egypt) Mohamed Safwat	6–3, 6–7^{(4–7)}, 6–2
Loss	4–2	Jan 2020	Canberra, Australia	Challenger	Hard	(Germany) Philipp Kohlschreiber	6–7^{(5–7)}, 6–4, 3–6

=== Doubles: 6 (6 titles) ===
Legend ATP Challenger (3–0) ITF Futures/World Tennis Tour (4–0)	Finals by surface Hard (3–0) Clay (3–0)

Result	W–L	Date	Tournament	Tier	Surface	Partner	Opponent	Score
Win	1–0	Mar 2018	France F5, Poitiers	Futures	Hard (i)	(Norway) Viktor Durasovic	(Germany) Christian Hirschmueller (Germany) David Novotny	6–4, 7–6^{(7–1)}
Win	2–0	Mar 2018	Portugal F6, Lisbon	Futures	Hard	(Estonia) Kenneth Raisma	(Canada) Steven Diez (Spain) Bruno Mardones	7–6^{(7–2)}, 6–2
Win	3–0	May 2018	Hungary F1, Zalaegerszeg	Futures	Clay	(Estonia) Kenneth Raisma	(Australia) Adam Taylor (Australia) Jason Taylor	6–4, 6–4
Win	4–0	May 2019	Shymkent, Kazakhstan	Challenger	Clay	(Austria) Jurij Rodionov	(Portugal) Gonçalo Oliveira (Belarus) Andrei Vasilevski	6–4, 3–6, [10–8]
Win	5–0	Jul 2019	Amersfoort, Netherlands	Challenger	Clay	(Finland) Harri Heliövaara	(Netherlands) Jesper de Jong (Netherlands) Ryan Nijboer	6–3, 6–4
Win	6–0	Nov 2020	Bratislava, Slovakia	Challenger	Hard (i)	(Finland) Harri Heliövaara	(Slovakia) Lukáš Klein (Slovakia) Alex Molčan	6–4, 6–3

== Wins over top 10 players ==
- He has a 4–14 record against players who were, at the time the match was played, ranked in the top 10.

Season	2019	2020	2021	2022	2023	Total
Wins	1	0	1	0	2	4

#	Player	Rank	Event	Surface	Rd	Score	ERR
2019
1.	(Austria) Dominic Thiem	5	Davis Cup, Espoo, Finland	Hard (i)	Z1	6–3, 6–2	163
2021
2.	(Germany) Alexander Zverev	7	Miami Open, United States	Hard	2R	1–6, 6–3, 6–1	83
2023
3.	(Italy) Jannik Sinner	9	Rosmalen Championships, Netherlands	Grass	QF	6–3, 6–4	42
4.	Andrey Rublev	8	Cincinnati Open, United States	Hard	2R	7–6^{(12–10)}, 5–7, 7–6^{(7–3)}	60
