= Roberto Cid Subervi =

Dominican tennis player

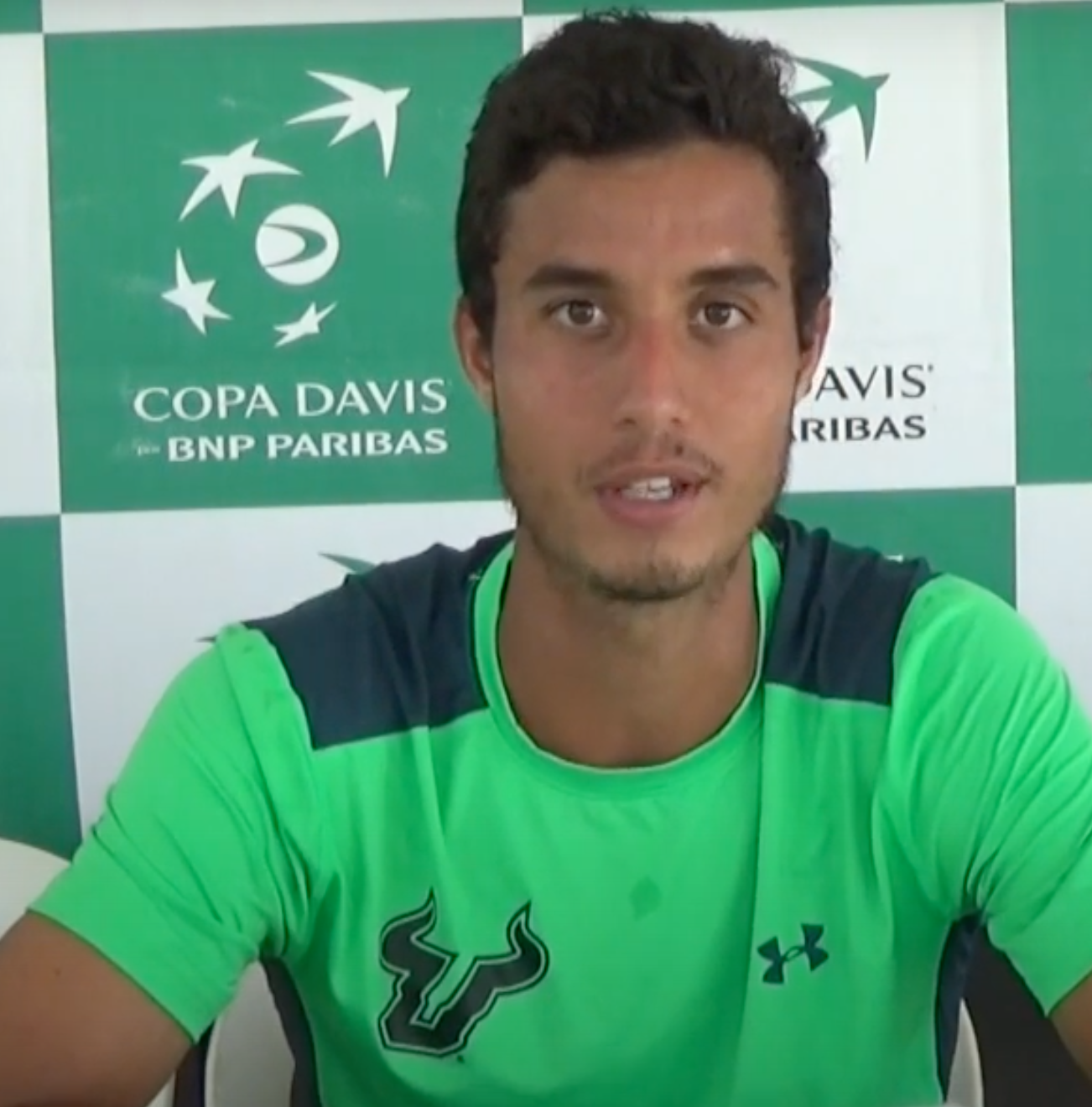
- Country (sports): United States (2010–2012); Dominican Republic (2012– )
- Residence: Tampa, Florida, United States
- Born: 30 August 1993 (age 32) Santo Domingo, Dominican Republic
- Height: 1.93 m (6 ft 4 in)
- Plays: Right-handed (two-handed backhand)
- College: University of South Florida (2013–2016)
- Prize money: $311,084

Singles
- Career record: 8–14 (at ATP Tour level, Grand Slam level, and in Davis Cup)
- Career titles: 0
- Highest ranking: No. 211 (14 September 2020)
- Current ranking: No. 376 (17 November 2025)

Grand Slam singles results
- Australian Open: Q1 (2019, 2021)
- French Open: Q1 (2020, 2021)
- Wimbledon: Q1 (2021)
- US Open: Q1 (2018, 2021)

Doubles
- Career record: 1–3 (at ATP Tour level, Grand Slam level, and in Davis Cup)
- Career titles: 0
- Highest ranking: No. 262 (19 October 2020)
- Current ranking: No. 812 (26 September 2022)

Team competitions
- Davis Cup: 4–11
Medal record
Men's tennis
Representing the Dominican Republic
Pan American Games
Bronze medal – third place	2023 Santiago	Doubles
- Last updated on: 15 December 2025.

Roberto Cid Subervi (Spanish pronunciation: [roˈβeɾto ˈsið suˈβeɾβi]; born 30 August 1993) is a Dominican–American tennis player.

Cid Subervi has a career high ATP singles ranking of 211 achieved on 14 September 2020. He also has a career high ATP doubles ranking of 262, achieved on 19 October 2020. Cid Subervi has won 4 ITF singles titles and 1 ITF doubles title.

Cid Subervi has represented Dominican Republic at Davis Cup, where he has a win–loss record of 4–11.

== College career ==
In 2016, Cid Subervi was ranked no. 2 in the nation in the NCAA Div 1 singles rankings in his last year at University of South Florida. Partnering with Sasha Gozun, he was ranked no. 6 in the nation in the NCAA Div 1 doubles rankings in 2015.

He reached the quarterfinals of the 2016 NCAA Division I Men's Tennis Championships in singles, losing to the eventual champion Mackenzie McDonald from UCLA, and he had wins over Dominik Kopfer from Tulane University, Cameron Norrie from Texas Christian University, and Ryan Shane from University of Virginia. In 2014, he made the quarterfinals of the 2014 NCAA Division I Men's Tennis Championships in singles, defeating No. 1 player in the nation Clay Thompson from UCLA.

== Singles performance timeline ==
Key
W	F	SF	QF	#R	RR	Q#	DNQ	A	NH

(W) winner; (F) finalist; (SF) semifinalist; (QF) quarterfinalist; (#R) rounds 4, 3, 2, 1; (RR) round-robin stage; (Q#) qualification round; (DNQ) did not qualify; (A) absent; (NH) not held; (SR) strike rate (events won / competed); (W–L) win–loss record.
To avoid confusion and double counting, these charts are updated at the conclusion of a tournament or when the player's participation has ended.

Current through the 2022 Davis Cup.

Tournament	2012	2013	2014	2015	2016	2017	2018	2019	2020	2021	2022	…	2025	SR	W–L
Grand Slam tournaments
Australian Open	A	A	A	A	A	A	A	Q1	A	Q1	A			0 / 0	0–0
French Open	A	A	A	A	A	A	A	A	Q1	Q1				0 / 0	0–0
Wimbledon	A	A	A	A	A	A	A	A	NH	Q1				0 / 0	0–0
US Open	A	A	A	A	A	A	Q1	A	A	Q1				0 / 0	0–0
Win–loss	0–0	0–0	0–0	0–0	0–0	0–0	0–0	0–0	0–0	0–0	0–0			0 / 0	0–0
ATP World Tour Masters 1000
Indian Wells Masters	A	A	A	A	A	A	A	A	NH	A				0 / 0	0–0
Miami Open	A	A	A	A	A	A	A	A	NH	Q1				0 / 0	0–0
Monte-Carlo Masters	A	A	A	A	A	A	A	A	NH	A				0 / 0	0–0
Madrid Open	A	A	A	A	A	A	A	A	NH	A				0 / 0	0–0
Italian Open	A	A	A	A	A	A	A	A	A	A				0 / 0	0–0
Canadian Open	A	A	A	A	A	A	A	A	NH	A				0 / 0	0–0
Cincinnati Masters	A	A	A	A	A	A	A	A	A	A				0 / 0	0–0
Shanghai Masters	A	A	A	A	A	A	A	A	NH					0 / 0	0–0
Paris Masters	A	A	A	A	A	A	A	A	A	A				0 / 0	0–0
Win–loss	0–0	0–0	0–0	0–0	0–0	0–0	0–0	0–0	0–0	0–0	0–0			0 / 0	0–0
National representation
Davis Cup	Z2	Z1	A	PO	Z1	Z1	Z1	Z1	QR	Z2				0 / 0	6–12
Career statistics
	2012	2013	2014	2015	2016	2017	2018	2019	2020	2021	2022	…	2025	Career	
Tournaments	0	0	0	0	0	0	0	0	0	0	0			0	
Titles / Finals	0 / 0	0 / 0	0 / 0	0 / 0	0 / 0	0 / 0	0 / 0	0 / 0	0 / 0	0 / 0	0 / 0			0 / 0	
Overall win–loss	1–2	1–1	0–0	0–2	0–1	0–1	1–2	0–1	1–1	1–1	1–1 (Note: Including 1 loss in 2023)		2–1	8–14	
Year-end ranking	1260	2097	1325	978	595	412	251	258	228	295	604		376	36%	

== Challenger and Futures/World Tennis Finals ==
=== Singles: 26 (15–11) ===
Legend (singles) ATP Challenger Tour (0–4) ITF Futures Tour/World Tennis Tour (15–7)	Titles by surface Hard (9–6) Clay (6–5) Grass (0–0) Carpet (0–0)

Result	W–L	Date	Tournament	Tier	Surface	Opponent	Score
Loss	0–1	Jun 2015	Turkey F23, Bursa	Futures	Hard	(France) Yannick Jankovits	5–7, 3–6
Win	1–1	Jun 2016	Colombia F2, Barranquilla	Futures	Clay	(Argentina) Facundo Mena	6–1, 6–2
Loss	1–2	Aug 2016	Germany F10, Wetzlar	Futures	Clay	(Germany) Marvin Netuschil	6–3, 6–7^{(6–8)}, 4–6
Win	2–2	Jan 2017	USA F3, Plantation, Florida	Futures	Clay	(Canada) Félix Auger-Aliassime	6–7^{(4–7)}, 7–6^{(7–3)}, 6–0
Loss	2–3	Sep 2017	Canada F6, Toronto	Futures	Clay	(United States) Kevin King	1–6, 2–6
Win	3–3	Nov 2017	USA F35, Birmingham, Alabama	Futures	Clay	(Italy) Fabrizio Ornago	4–6, 6–3, 6–1
Loss	3–4	Dec 2017	Dominican Republic F1, Santo Domingo Este	Futures	Hard	(Ecuador) Roberto Quiroz	4–6, 4–6
Win	4–4	Dec 2017	Dominican Republic F2, Santo Domingo Este	Futures	Hard	(Dominican Republic) José Hernández-Fernández	6–3, 6–2
Loss	4–5	Apr 2018	San Luis Potosí, Mexico	Challenger	Clay	(El Salvador) Marcelo Arévalo	3–6, 7–6^{(7–3)}, 4–6
Loss	4–6	Jun 2018	Shymkent, Kazakhstan	Challenger	Clay	(Germany) Yannick Hanfmann	6–7^{(3–7)}, 6–4, 2–6
Loss	4–7	Jun 2019	Fergana, Uzbekistan	Challenger	Hard	(Finland) Emil Ruusuvuori	3–6, 2–6
Win	5–7	Aug 2019	M25, Memphis, Tennessee	World Tennis Tour	Hard	(United States) Ulises Blanch	3–6, 6–3, 7–6^{(8–6)}
Win	6–7	Sep 2019	M25, Győr, Hungary	World Tennis Tour	Clay	(Czech Republic) Vít Kopřiva	6–1, 6–0
Win	7–7	Oct 2019	M25, Fayetteville, Arkansas	World Tennis Tour	Hard	(United States) Aleksandar Kovacevic	6–2, 6–2
Loss	7–8	Jan 2020	Ann Arbor, USA	Challenger	Hard (i)	(United States) Ulises Blanch	6–3, 4–6, 2–6
Loss	7–9	Feb 2022	M15, Punta Cana, Dominican Republic	World Tennis Tour	Hard	(Argentina) Francisco Comesaña	6–4, 5–7, 1–6
Win	8–9	Jun 2022	M25, Santo Domingo, Dominican Republic	World Tennis Tour	Hard	(France) Dan Added	6-2, 6-3
Win	9–9	May 2023	M15, Orange Park, Florida	World Tennis Tour	Clay	(Croatia) Matija Pecotić	0–6, 6–3, 6–2
Loss	9–10	May 2023	M15, Huntsville, Alabama	World Tennis Tour	Clay	(China) Fnu Nidunjianzan	5-7, 3-6
Win	10–10	Sep 2023	M15, Monastir, Tunisia	World Tennis Tour	Hard	(Slovakia) Peter Benjamin Privara	6–1, 6–3
Win	11–10	Jan 2024	M25, Welsey Chapel, Florida	World Tennis Tour	Hard	(United States) Nick Chappell	6–3, 6–2
Win	12–10	Sep 2024	M15 Pirot, Serbia	World Tennis Tour	Clay	(Serbia) Stefan Latinovic	6–2, 6–4
Win	13–10	Nov 2024	M15 Santo Domingo, Dominican Republic	World Tennis Tour	Hard	(Canada) Juan Carlos Aguilar	7–5, 6–3
Loss	13–11	Nov 2024	M15 Santo Domingo, Dominican Republic	World Tennis Tour	Hard	(Canada) Juan Carlos Aguilar	4–6, 6–4, 4–6
Win	14–11	Mar 2025	M25 Santo Domingo, Dominican Republic	World Tennis Tour	Hard	(United States) Garrett Johns	6–3, 6–3
Win	15–11	Jun 2024	M25 Santo Domingo, Dominican Republic	World Tennis Tour	Hard	(Canada) Nicolas Arseneault	6–2, 6–2

=== Doubles: 6 (3–3) ===
Legend (doubles) ATP Challenger Tour (1–1) ITF Futures Tour (2–2)	Titles by surface Hard (2–1) Clay (1–2) Grass (0–0) Carpet (0–0)

Result	W–L	Date	Tournament	Tier	Surface	Partner	Opponents	Score
Loss	0–1	Aug 2016	Germany F10, Wetzlar	Futures	Clay	(Japan) Naoki Nakagawa	(Germany) Jannis Kahlke (Germany) Robin Kern	0–6, 2–6
Loss	0–2	Aug 2016	Germany F11, Karlsruhe	Futures	Clay	(Japan) Naoki Nakagawa	(Germany) Johannes Härteis (Germany) Hannes Wagner	3–6, 5–7
Win	1–2	Sep 2017	Canada F5, Calgary	Futures	Hard	(Japan) Kaichi Uchida	(United States) Deiton Baughman (United States) Henry Craig	3–6, 6–3, [10–8]
Loss	1–3	Feb 2020	Drummondville, Canada	Challenger	Hard (i)	(Portugal) Gonçalo Oliveira	(France) Manuel Guinard (France) Arthur Rinderknech	6–7^{(4–7)}, 6–7^{(3–7)}
Win	2–3	Oct 2020	Lisbon, Portugal	Challenger	Clay	(Portugal) Gonçalo Oliveira	(Finland) Harri Heliövaara (Czech Republic) Zdeněk Kolář	7–6^{(7–5)}, 4–6, [10–4]
Win	3–3	Jan 2023	USA M25, Wesley Chapel, Florida	World Tennis Tour	Hard	(United States) Alfredo Perez	(Canada) Roy Stepanov (United States) Sekou Bangoura	6–3, 6–2
