= 2019 Internazionali di Tennis del Friuli Venezia Giulia – Men's doubles =

Men's doubles
- 2019 Internazionali di Tennis del Friuli Venezia Giulia

Final
- Champions: (Bosnia and Herzegovina) Tomislav Brkić (Croatia) Ante Pavić
- Runners-up: (Serbia) Nikola Čačić (Croatia) Antonio Šančić
- Score: 6–2, 6–3

Events
Singles	men	women
Doubles	men	women
← 2018 ·	Internazionali di Tennis del Friuli Venezia Giulia	· 2020 →

Denys Molchanov and Igor Zelenay were the defending champions but chose not to defend their title.

Tomislav Brkić and Ante Pavić won the title after defeating Nikola Čačić and Antonio Šančić 6–2, 6–3 in the final.

== Seeds ==
1. (Spain) Gerard Granollers / (Spain) David Vega Hernández (semifinals)
2. (Serbia) Nikola Čačić / (Croatia) Antonio Šančić (final)
3. (Brazil) Fabrício Neis / (Brazil) Fernando Romboli (quarterfinals)
4. (Bosnia and Herzegovina) Tomislav Brkić / (Croatia) Ante Pavić (champions)

== Draw ==
=== Key ===
- Q = Qualifier
- WC = Wild card
- LL = Lucky loser
- Alt = Alternate
- SE = Special exempt
- PR = Protected ranking
- ITF = ITF entry
- JE = Junior exempt
- w/o = Walkover
- r = Retired
- d = Defaulted
- SR = Special ranking

First round
1	(Spain) G Granollers (Spain) D Vega Hernández	6	6
WC	(Italy) A Basso (Italy) A Virgili	2	4
(Argentina) F Cerúndolo (Argentina) R Olivo
(France) B Bonzi (Venezuela) LD Martínez	w/o
4	(Bosnia and Herzegovina) T Brkić (Croatia) A Pavić	6	6
(United States) H Johnson (United States) Y Johnson	4	4
ITF	(Italy) R Bonadio (Kazakhstan) D Popko	1	6^{10}
ITF	(France) S Doumbia (France) F Reboul	6	7^{12}
WC	(Italy) J Berrettini (Italy) GM Moroni	3	4
3	(Brazil) F Neis (Brazil) F Romboli	6	6
(Sweden) M Eriksson (Brazil) F Meligeni Alves	2	2
WC	(Hungary) A Balázs (Hungary) Z Piros	6	6
(Australia) C O'Connell (Australia) A Vukic	1	4
2	(Serbia) N Čačić (Croatia) A Šančić	6	6

Quarterfinals
1	(Spain) G Granollers (Spain) D Vega Hernández	7	4	[10]
(France) B Bonzi (Venezuela) LD Martínez	5	6	[8]
4	(Bosnia and Herzegovina) T Brkić (Croatia) A Pavić	4	6	[10]
(Croatia) T Draganja (Brazil) O Luz	6	4	[4]
ITF	(France) S Doumbia (France) F Reboul	7^{7}	6
3	(Brazil) F Neis (Brazil) F Romboli	6^{5}	4
WC	(Hungary) A Balázs (Hungary) Z Piros
2	(Serbia) N Čačić (Croatia) A Šančić	w/o

Semifinals
1	(Spain) G Granollers (Spain) D Vega Hernández	6	2	[10]
4	(Bosnia and Herzegovina) T Brkić (Croatia) A Pavić	2	6	[12]
ITF	(France) S Doumbia (France) F Reboul	2	7^{7}	[6]
2	(Serbia) N Čačić (Croatia) A Šančić	6	6^{4}	[10]

Final
4	(Bosnia and Herzegovina) T Brkić (Croatia) A Pavić	6	6
2	(Serbia) N Čačić (Croatia) A Šančić	2	3
