= 2018 Internazionali di Tennis del Friuli Venezia Giulia – Doubles =

Doubles
- 2018 Internazionali di Tennis del Friuli Venezia Giulia

Final
- Champions: (Ukraine) Denys Molchanov (Slovakia) Igor Zelenay
- Runners-up: (Slovakia) Andrej Martin (Spain) Daniel Muñoz de la Nava
- Score: 3–6, 6–3, [11–9]

Events
Singles	Doubles
- Internazionali di Tennis del Friuli Venezia Giulia

Roman Jebavý and Zdeněk Kolář were the defending champions but only Kolář chose to defend his title, partnering Aldin Šetkić. Kolář lost in the first round to Nikola Čačić and Luca Margaroli.

Denys Molchanov and Igor Zelenay won the title after defeating Andrej Martin and Daniel Muñoz de la Nava 3–6, 6–3, [11–9] in the final.

== Seeds ==
1. (Ukraine) Denys Molchanov / (Slovakia) Igor Zelenay (champions)
2. (Croatia) Tomislav Draganja / (Brazil) Fernando Romboli (first round)
3. (Italy) Daniele Bracciali / (Italy) Julian Ocleppo (first round)
4. (Venezuela) Luis David Martínez / (Portugal) Gonçalo Oliveira (semifinals)

== Draw ==
Key

- Q = Qualifier
- WC = Wild card
- LL = Lucky loser
- Alt = Alternate
- ITF = ITF entry
- PR = Protected ranking
- SR = Special ranking
- SE = Special exempt
- JE = Junior exempt
- JR = Junior Accelerator Programme entrant
- CO = College Accelerator Programme entrant
- NG = Next Gen Accelerator Program entrant
- w/o = Walkover
- r = Retired
- d = Defaulted

First round
1	(Ukraine) D Molchanov (Slovakia) I Zelenay	7^{10}	6
(Argentina) P Cachin (Spain) C Gómez-Herrera	6^{8}	1
(Serbia) N Čačić (Switzerland) L Margaroli	7	7^{8}
(Czech Republic) Z Kolář (Bosnia and Herzegovina) A Šetkić	5	6^{6}
3	(Italy) D Bracciali (Italy) J Ocleppo	5	2
(Brazil) G Clezar (Portugal) J Domingues	7	6
WC	(Italy) Riccardo Balzerani (Italy) F Forti	6	1
WC	(Italy) J Berrettini (Italy) E Dalla Valle	4	1^{r}
(Portugal) B Saraiva (Netherlands) S Verbeek	4	7	[8]
(Argentina) F Agamenone (Italy) W Trusendi	6	5	[10]
(Sweden) M Eriksson (Sweden) A Göransson	6^{4}	7	[8]
4	(Venezuela) LD Martínez (Portugal) G Oliveira	7^{7}	5	[10]
(Slovakia) A Martin (Spain) D Muñoz de la Nava	6	6
WC	(Italy) Matteo Marfia (Italy) Luca Serena	4	4
(Lithuania) L Grigelis (Italy) A Motti	6	6
2	(Croatia) T Draganja (Brazil) F Romboli	3	4

Quarterfinals
1	(Ukraine) D Molchanov (Slovakia) I Zelenay	6	6
(Serbia) N Čačić (Switzerland) L Margaroli	1	1
(Brazil) G Clezar (Portugal) J Domingues	4	6	[10]
WC	(Italy) R Balzerani (Italy) F Forti	6	4	[5]
(Argentina) F Agamenone (Italy) W Trusendi	6^{3}	4
4	(Venezuela) LD Martínez (Portugal) G Oliveira	7^{7}	6
(Slovakia) A Martin (Spain) D Muñoz de la Nava	2	6	[10]
(Lithuania) L Grigelis (Italy) A Motti	6	1	[4]

Semifinals
1	(Ukraine) D Molchanov (Slovakia) I Zelenay	w/o
(Brazil) G Clezar (Portugal) J Domingues
4	(Venezuela) LD Martínez (Portugal) G Oliveira	4	5
(Slovakia) A Martin (Spain) D Muñoz de la Nava	6	7

Final
1	(Ukraine) D Molchanov (Slovakia) I Zelenay	3	6	[11]
(Slovakia) A Martin (Spain) D Muñoz de la Nava	6	3	[9]
