= 2026 Internazionali di Tennis del Friuli Venezia Giulia =

- Date: 13–19 July (men); 20–25 July (women)
- Edition: 23rd (men); 11th (women)
- Category: ATP Challenger Tour; ITF Women's World Tennis Tour
- Surface: Clay / Outdoor
- Location: Cordenons, Italy

Champions

Men's singles
- (Spain) Max Alcalá Gurri

Women's singles
- (Serbia) Mia Ristić

Men's doubles
- (Romania) Alexandru Jecan / (Czech Republic) David Poljak

Women's doubles
- (Italy) Gaia Maduzzi / (Italy) Vittoria Paganetti
- Internazionali di Tennis del Friuli Venezia Giulia

The 2026 Serena Wines 1881 Acqua Maniva Tennis Cup was a professional tennis tournament played on outdoor clay courts. It was the 23rd edition of the tournament for men, which was part of the 2026 ATP Challenger Tour, and the 11th edition for women, which was part of the 2026 ITF Women's World Tennis Tour. It took place in Cordenons, Italy, between 13 and 25 July 2026.

== Champions ==
=== Men's singles ===
- (Spain) Max Alcalá Gurri def. (Italy) Federico Bondioli 6–2, 6–0.

=== Women's singles ===
- (Serbia) Mia Ristić def. (Italy) Nuria Brancaccio 6–3, 6–3.

=== Men's doubles ===
- (Romania) Alexandru Jecan / (Czech Republic) David Poljak def. (Republic of Ireland) Charles Barry / (Bulgaria) Anthony Genov 4–6, 7–6^{(7–4)}, [10–3].

=== Women's doubles ===
- (Italy) Gaia Maduzzi / (Italy) Vittoria Paganetti def. (Finland) Laura Hietaranta / (Latvia) Beatrise Zeltiņa 2–6, 6–4, [10–5].

== Men's singles main-draw entrants ==
=== Seeds ===
Country	Player	Rank^{1}	Seed
BOL	Hugo Dellien	162	1
FRA	Harold Mayot	199	2
IND	Sumit Nagal	219	3
ITA	Lorenzo Giustino	226	4
ESP	Max Alcalá Gurri	228	5
ARG	Guido Iván Justo	238	6
ITA	Stefano Napolitano	242	7
BRA	Thiago Seyboth Wild	243	8

- ^{1} Rankings are as of 29 June 2026.

=== Other entrants ===
The following players received wildcards into the singles main draw:

- (Italy) Lorenzo Angelini
- (Italy) Enrico Dalla Valle
- (Italy) Juan Cruz Martin Manzano

The following player received entry into the singles main draw using a protected ranking:

- (Germany) Max Hans Rehberg

The following player received entry into the singles main draw as a special exempt:

- (Bolivia) Hugo Dellien

The following player received entry into the singles main draw as an alternate:

- (Greece) Ioannis Xilas

The following players received entry from the qualifying draw:

- (Hungary) Mátyás Füle
- (Ukraine) Georgii Kravchenko
- (Hungary) Péter Makk
- (North Macedonia) Oleg Prihodko
- (Italy) Giorgio Tabacco
- (Argentina) Gonzalo Villanueva
