= 2026 Internazionali di Tennis del Friuli Venezia Giulia – Men's singles =

Men's singles
- 2026 Internazionali di Tennis del Friuli Venezia Giulia

Final
- Champion: (Spain) Max Alcalá Gurri
- Runner-up: (Italy) Federico Bondioli
- Score: 6–2, 6–0

Events
Singles	men	women
Doubles	men	women
- Internazionali di Tennis del Friuli Venezia Giulia

Dušan Lajović was the defending champion but chose not to defend his title.

Max Alcalá Gurri won the title after defeating Federico Bondioli 6–2, 6–0 in the final.

== Seeds ==
1. (Bolivia) Hugo Dellien (quarterfinals)
2. (France) Harold Mayot (first round)
3. (India) Sumit Nagal (quarterfinals)
4. (Italy) Lorenzo Giustino (first round)
5. (Spain) Max Alcalá Gurri (champion)
6. (Argentina) Guido Iván Justo (second round)
7. (Italy) Stefano Napolitano (quarterfinals)
8. (Brazil) Thiago Seyboth Wild (second round)

== Draw ==
Key

- Q = Qualifier
- WC = Wild card
- LL = Lucky loser
- Alt = Alternate
- ITF = ITF entry
- PR = Protected ranking
- SR = Special ranking
- SE = Special exempt
- JE = Junior exempt
- JR = Junior Accelerator Programme entrant
- CO = College Accelerator Programme entrant
- NG = Next Gen Accelerator Program entrant
- w/o = Walkover
- r = Retired
- d = Defaulted

=== Finals ===
Semifinals
Q	(Hungary) Mátyás Füle	2	4
(Italy) Federico Bondioli	6	6
5	(Spain) Max Alcalá Gurri	4	7	6
Q	(Argentina) Gonzalo Villanueva	6	5	2

Final
(Italy) Federico Bondioli	2	0
5	(Spain) Max Alcalá Gurri	6	6

=== Top half ===
First round
1/SE	(Bolivia) H Dellien	6	6
Alt	(Greece) Ioannis Xilas	2	3
(Bosnia and Herzegovina) A Nedić	3	4
WC	(Italy) E Dalla Valle	6	6
Q	(Hungary) Mátyás Füle	4	6	7
Q	(North Macedonia) O Prihodko	6	2	5
Q	(Hungary) Péter Makk	6	3	5
8	(Brazil) T Seyboth Wild	2	6	7
3	(India) S Nagal	6	6
(Romania) C Crețu	2	4
Q	(Ukraine) G Kravchenko	6^{2}	3
(Argentina) JB Torres	7^{7}	6
(Ecuador) Á Guillén Meza	7^{9}	3	6^{7}
(Italy) F Bondioli	6^{7}	6	7^{9}
PR	(Germany) MH Rehberg	3	4
6	(Argentina) GI Justo	6	6

Second round
1/SE	(Bolivia) H Dellien	5	6	6
WC	(Italy) E Dalla Valle	7	0	1
Q	(Hungary) M Füle	5	6	6
8	(Brazil) T Seyboth Wild	7	4	3
3	(India) S Nagal	7^{7}	6
(Argentina) JB Torres	6^{3}	2
(Italy) F Bondioli	6	7^{7}
6	(Argentina) GI Justo	3	6^{3}

Quarterfinals
1/SE	(Bolivia) H Dellien	6	3	4
Q	(Hungary) M Füle	2	6	6
3	(India) S Nagal	6	5	3
(Italy) F Bondioli	1	7	6

Semifinals
Q	(Hungary) M Füle	2	4
(Italy) F Bondioli	6	6

=== Bottom half ===
First round
5	(Spain) M Alcalá Gurri	6	6
Q	(Italy) Giorgio Tabacco	0	2
(Spain) I Montes de la Torre	3	0
WC	(Italy) Lorenzo Angelini	6	6
(Czech Republic) M Mrva	3	7^{7}	6
(Italy) CA Caniato	6	6^{5}	4
(Uruguay) F Roncadelli	2	6	6
4	(Italy) L Giustino	6	2	1
7	(Italy) S Napolitano	6	4	6
(France) F Balshaw	1	6	1
(Italy) F Agamenone	7^{7}	4	5
(Argentina) A Barrena	6^{4}	6	7
Q	(Argentina) G Villanueva	6	6
(Italy) M Ribecai	1	2
WC	(Italy) Juan Cruz Martin Manzano	6	6
2	(France) H Mayot	4	3

Second round
5	(Spain) M Alcalá Gurri	6	6
WC	(Italy) L Angelini	4	2
(Czech Republic) M Mrva	2	6	6^{7}
(Uruguay) F Roncadelli	6	4	7^{9}
7	(Italy) S Napolitano	6	3	7^{7}
(Argentina) A Barrena	4	6	6^{2}
Q	(Argentina) G Villanueva	6	6
WC	(Italy) JC Martin Manzano	2	0

Quarterfinals
5	(Spain) M Alcalá Gurri	6	6
(Uruguay) F Roncadelli	1	3
7	(Italy) S Napolitano	3	6^{2}
Q	(Argentina) G Villanueva	6	7^{7}

Semifinals
5	(Spain) M Alcalá Gurri	4	7	6
Q	(Argentina) G Villanueva	6	5	2
