= 2019 Internazionali di Tennis del Friuli Venezia Giulia – Men's singles =

Men's singles
- 2019 Internazionali di Tennis del Friuli Venezia Giulia

Final
- Champion: (Australia) Christopher O'Connell
- Runner-up: (Germany) Jeremy Jahn
- Score: 7–5, 6–2

Events
| Singles | men | women |
| Doubles | men | women |
- Internazionali di Tennis del Friuli Venezia Giulia

Paolo Lorenzi was the defending champion but lost in the third round to Markus Eriksson.

Christopher O'Connell won the title after defeating Jeremy Jahn 7–5, 6–2 in the final.

== Seeds ==
All seeds receive a bye into the second round.

1. (Italy) Paolo Lorenzi (third round)
2. (Slovakia) Andrej Martin (third round)
3. (Hungary) Attila Balázs (third round)
4. (Finland) Emil Ruusuvuori (second round)
5. (Chile) Alejandro Tabilo (third round)
6. (Slovenia) Blaž Kavčič (third round)
7. (Australia) Aleksandar Vukic (second round)
8. (Portugal) Gonçalo Oliveira (withdrew)
9. (Kazakhstan) Dmitry Popko (second round)
10. (Croatia) Nino Serdarušić (second round)
11. (Italy) Gian Marco Moroni (quarterfinals)
12. (Argentina) Renzo Olivo (second round)
13. (Slovakia) Alex Molčan (second round)
14. (Sweden) Markus Eriksson (semifinals)
15. (Argentina) Francisco Cerúndolo (quarterfinals)
16. (Chile) Marcelo Tomás Barrios Vera (second round)

== Draw ==
Key

- Q = Qualifier
- WC = Wild card
- LL = Lucky loser
- Alt = Alternate
- ITF = ITF entry
- PR = Protected ranking
- SR = Special ranking
- SE = Special exempt
- JE = Junior exempt
- JR = Junior Accelerator Programme entrant
- CO = College Accelerator Programme entrant
- NG = Next Gen Accelerator Program entrant
- w/o = Walkover
- r = Retired
- d = Defaulted

=== Finals ===
Quarterfinals
14/ITF | (Sweden) Markus Eriksson | 6 | 4 | 6
(Argentina) Andrea Collarini | 3 | 6 | 4
(Germany) Jeremy Jahn | 6 | 4 | 7^{7}
11 | (Italy) Gian Marco Moroni | 2 | 6 | 6^{2}
ITF | (Australia) Christopher O'Connell | 6 | 1 | 6
15/ITF | (Argentina) Francisco Cerúndolo | 1 | 6 | 3
(Hungary) Zsombor Piros | 6 | 6
(Brazil) Thiago Seyboth Wild | 4 | 4

Semifinals
14/ITF | (Sweden) Markus Eriksson | 1 | 1
(Germany) Jeremy Jahn | 6 | 6
ITF | (Australia) Christopher O'Connell | 7^{7} | 6
(Hungary) Zsombor Piros | 6^{3} | 2

Final
(Germany) Jeremy Jahn | 5 | 2
ITF | (Australia) Christopher O'Connell | 7 | 6

=== Top half ===
==== Section 1 ====
First round
Q | (France) F Reboul | 2 | 2
(Brazil) G Clezar | 6 | 6
(Italy) J Berrettini | 4 | 4
WC | (Italy) E Dalla Valle | 6 | 6
WC | (Italy) G Fonio | 4 | 6^{3}
Alt | (Brazil) O Luz | 6 | 7^{7}
WC | (Italy) G Quinzi | 0 | 2
(Argentina) A Collarini | 6 | 6

Second round
1 | (Italy) P Lorenzi | 2 | 7 | 7^{7}
(Brazil) G Clezar | 6 | 5 | 6^{5}
WC | (Italy) E Dalla Valle | 6 | 3 | 6^{8}
14/ITF | (Sweden) M Eriksson | 4 | 6 | 7^{10}
9 | (Kazakhstan) D Popko | 5 | 3
Alt | (Brazil) O Luz | 7 | 6
(Argentina) A Collarini | 6 | 6
7 | (Australia) A Vukic | 4 | 4

Third round
1 | (Italy) P Lorenzi | 4 | 6 | 3
14/ITF | (Sweden) M Eriksson | 6 | 3 | 6
Alt | (Brazil) O Luz | 5 | 4
(Argentina) A Collarini | 7 | 6

Quarterfinals
14/ITF | (Sweden) M Eriksson | 6 | 4 | 6
(Argentina) A Collarini | 3 | 6 | 4

==== Section 2 ====
First round
(Germany) Jeremy Jahn | 6 | 6
ITF | (China) F Sun | 3 | 2
ITF | (Brazil) F Meligeni Alves | 6^{3} | 6 | 2
(Italy) A Basso | 7^{7} | 3 | 6
(Italy) L Musetti | 6 | 6
(France) B Bonzi | 1 | 4
(Italy) A Pellegrino | 6 | 6
(France) S Doumbia | 2 | 4

Second round
4 | (Finland) E Ruusuvuori | 4 | 4
(Germany) J Jahn | 6 | 6
(Italy) A Basso | 7^{7} | 3 | 7^{8}
13 | (Slovakia) A Molčan | 6^{5} | 6 | 6^{6}
11 | (Italy) GM Moroni | 6^{6} | 7^{7} | 4
(Italy) L Musetti | 7^{8} | 6^{5} | 1^{r}
(Italy) A Pellegrino | 3 | 7^{10} | 1
5 | (Chile) A Tabilo | 6 | 6^{8} | 6

Third round
(Germany) J Jahn | 6 | 6
(Italy) A Basso | 2 | 4
11 | (Italy) GM Moroni | 7^{7} | 2 | 6
5 | (Chile) A Tabilo | 6^{1} | 6 | 3

Quarterfinals
(Germany) J Jahn | 6 | 4 | 7^{7}
11 | (Italy) GM Moroni | 2 | 6 | 6^{2}

=== Bottom half ===
==== Section 3 ====
First round
ITF | (Australia) C O'Connell | 1 | 6 | 7
(Chinese Taipei) C-h Tseng | 6 | 4 | 5
(Bosnia and Herzegovina) T Brkić | 6 | 6
(Italy) G Zeppieri | 3 | 3
(Spain) Carlos Boluda-Purkiss | 6^{5} | 2
Q | (Russia) E Tiurnev | 7^{7} | 6
(Italy) R Bonadio | 1 | 6^{9}
WC | (Italy) F Arnaboldi | 6 | 7^{11}

Second round
LL | (Italy) Nicolò Inserra | 2 | 3
ITF | (Australia) C O'Connell | 6 | 6
(Bosnia and Herzegovina) T Brkić | 7^{7} | 5 | 6
12 | (Argentina) R Olivo | 6^{4} | 7 | 3
15/ITF | (Argentina) F Cerúndolo | 5 | 6 | 7^{7}
Q | (Russia) E Tiurnev | 7 | 4 | 6^{5}
WC | (Italy) F Arnaboldi | 1 | 3
3 | (Hungary) A Balázs | 6 | 6

Third round
ITF | (Australia) C O'Connell | 6 | 6
(Bosnia and Herzegovina) T Brkić | 4 | 2
15/ITF | (Argentina) F Cerúndolo | 3 | 6 | 6
3 | (Hungary) A Balázs | 6 | 3 | 2

Quarterfinals
ITF | (Australia) C O'Connell | 6 | 1 | 6
15/ITF | (Argentina) F Cerúndolo | 1 | 6 | 3

==== Section 4 ====
First round
(Italy) F Forti | 6 | 4 | 6
WC | (Italy) Riccardo Balzerani | 4 | 6 | 2
(Spain) G Granollers | 3 | 1
(Hungary) Z Piros | 6 | 6
(Spain) D Gimeno Traver | 6^{5} | 1
(Brazil) T Seyboth Wild | 7^{7} | 6
(Colombia) A González | 6 | 6
(Croatia) A Pavić | 3 | 2

Second round
6 | (Slovenia) B Kavčič | 6 | 7^{7}
(Italy) F Forti | 3 | 6^{2}
(Hungary) Z Piros | 6 | 7
10 | (Croatia) N Serdarušić | 3 | 5
16 | (Chile) MT Barrios Vera | 1 | 7^{7} | 4
(Brazil) T Seyboth Wild | 6 | 6^{5} | 6
(Colombia) A González | 2 | 5
2 | (Slovakia) A Martin | 6 | 7

Third round
6 | (Slovenia) B Kavčič | 6 | 3 | 3
(Hungary) Z Piros | 1 | 6 | 6
(Brazil) T Seyboth Wild | 6 | 6
2 | (Slovakia) A Martin | 2 | 2

Quarterfinals
(Hungary) Z Piros | 6 | 6
(Brazil) T Seyboth Wild | 4 | 4
