= 2016 Internazionali di Tennis del Friuli Venezia Giulia – Singles =

Singles
- 2016 Internazionali di Tennis del Friuli Venezia Giulia

Final
- Champion: (Japan) Taro Daniel
- Runner-up: (Spain) Daniel Gimeno-Traver
- Score: 6–3, 6–4

Events
Singles	Doubles
← 2015 ·	Internazionali di Tennis del Friuli Venezia Giulia	· 2017 →

Filip Krajinović was the defending champion but lost in the quarterfinals to Paolo Lorenzi.

Taro Daniel won the title after defeating Daniel Gimeno-Traver 6–3, 6–4 in the final.

== Seeds ==
1. (Italy) Paolo Lorenzi (semifinals)
2. (Japan) Taro Daniel (champion)
3. (Argentina) Leonardo Mayer (second round)
4. (Spain) Daniel Gimeno-Traver (final)
5. (Slovenia) Grega Žemlja (first round)
6. (Italy) Marco Cecchinato (second round, withdrew)
7. (Sweden) Elias Ymer (quarterfinals)
8. (Serbia) Filip Krajinović (quarterfinals)

== Draw ==
=== Key ===
- Q = Qualifier
- WC = Wild card
- LL = Lucky loser
- Alt = Alternate
- SE = Special exempt
- PR = Protected ranking
- ITF = ITF entry
- JE = Junior exempt
- w/o = Walkover
- r = Retired
- d = Defaulted
- SR = Special ranking

=== Finals ===
Semifinals
1/WC	(Italy) Paolo Lorenzi	3	6	6^{4}
4	(Spain) Daniel Gimeno-Traver	6	3	7^{7}
WC	(Italy) Gianluigi Quinzi	5	3
2	(Japan) Taro Daniel	7	6

Final
4	(Spain) Daniel Gimeno-Traver	3	4
2	(Japan) Taro Daniel	6	6

=== Top half ===
First round
1/WC	(Italy) P Lorenzi	6	3	6
Q	(Italy) W Trusendi	4	6	1
Q	(Croatia) A Šančić	1	6^{4}
(Italy) Edoardo Eremin	6	7^{7}
(Croatia) N Mektić	4	6	6
WC	(Italy) G Mager	6	1	4
(Chile) C Garin	0	6	1
8	(Serbia) F Krajinović	6	3	6
4	(Spain) D Gimeno-Traver	6	2
(Romania) A Ungur	2	1^{r}
Q	(Argentina) A Collarini	6	6
(Bulgaria) D Kuzmanov	1	2
(France) G Sakharov	2	1
Alt	(Czech Republic) J Mertl	6	6
LL	(France) S Doumbia	6	4	2
6	(Italy) M Cecchinato	3	6	6

Second round
1/WC	(Italy) P Lorenzi	4	6	6
(Italy) E Eremin	6	1	1
(Croatia) N Mektić	2	2
8	(Serbia) F Krajinović	6	6
4	(Spain) D Gimeno-Traver	6	6
Q	(Argentina) A Collarini	3	3
Alt	(Czech Republic) J Mertl	w/o
6	(Italy) M Cecchinato

Quarterfinals
1/WC	(Italy) P Lorenzi	6	4	6
8	(Serbia) F Krajinović	2	6	1
4	(Spain) D Gimeno-Traver	6	6
Alt	(Czech Republic) J Mertl	1	4

Semifinals
1/WC	(Italy) P Lorenzi	3	6	6^{4}
4	(Spain) D Gimeno-Traver	6	3	7^{7}

=== Bottom half ===
First round
7	(Sweden) E Ymer	5	6	7^{7}
(Czech Republic) Z Kolář	7	2	6^{5}
(Italy) L Giustino	6	6
(Italy) S Caruso	2	4
WC	(Italy) G Quinzi	6	6
(Spain) Pablo Vivero González	1	1
(Austria) B Trinker	0	3
3	(Argentina) L Mayer	6	6
5	(Slovenia) G Žemlja	2	6	4
Q	(Spain) C Taberner	6	4	6
(Italy) L Sonego	6	6
(Portugal) FF Silva	4	1
(Italy) R Bellotti	1	4
WC	(Italy) M Donati	6	6
PR	(Brazil) F de Paula	7^{10}	3	3
2	(Japan) T Daniel	6^{8}	6	6

Second round
7	(Sweden) E Ymer	6	3	6
(Italy) L Giustino	2	6	1
WC	(Italy) G Quinzi	6	2	6
3	(Argentina) L Mayer	4	6	4
Q	(Spain) C Taberner	2	5
(Italy) L Sonego	6	7
WC	(Italy) M Donati	3	4
2	(Japan) T Daniel	6	6

Quarterfinals
7	(Sweden) E Ymer	6^{5}	6	5
WC	(Italy) G Quinzi	7^{7}	3	7
(Italy) L Sonego
2	(Japan) T Daniel	w/o

Semifinals
WC	(Italy) G Quinzi	5	3
2	(Japan) T Daniel	7	6
