= 2016 Internazionali di Tennis del Friuli Venezia Giulia – Doubles =

Doubles
- 2016 Internazionali di Tennis del Friuli Venezia Giulia

Final
- Champion: (Germany) Andre Begemann (Belarus) Aliaksandr Bury
- Runner-up: (Czech Republic) Roman Jebavý (Czech Republic) Zdeněk Kolář
- Score: 5–7, 6–4, [11–9]

Events
Singles	Doubles
← 2015 ·	Internazionali di Tennis del Friuli Venezia Giulia	· 2017 →

Andrej Martin and Igor Zelenay were the defending champions but only Zelenay returned, partnering Hans Podlipnik. Zelenay lost in the semifinals to Andre Begemann and Aliaksandr Bury.

Begemann and Bury won the title after defeating Roman Jebavý and Zdeněk Kolář 5–7, 6–4, [11–9] in the final.

== Seeds ==
1. (Chile) Hans Podlipnik / (Slovakia) Igor Zelenay (semifinals)
2. (Croatia) Nikola Mektić / (Croatia) Antonio Šančić (first round)
3. (Germany) Andre Begemann / (Belarus) Aliaksandr Bury (champions)
4. (Italy) Riccardo Ghedin / (Italy) Alessandro Motti (quarterfinals)

== Draw ==
=== Key ===
- Q = Qualifier
- WC = Wild card
- LL = Lucky loser
- Alt = Alternate
- SE = Special exempt
- PR = Protected ranking
- ITF = ITF entry
- JE = Junior exempt
- w/o = Walkover
- r = Retired
- d = Defaulted
- SR = Special ranking

First round
1	(Chile) H Podlipnik (Slovakia) I Zelenay	6	6
PR	(Brazil) F de Paula (Austria) B Trinker	4	1
WC	(Italy) Edoardo Eremin (Italy) G Quinzi	4	6	[10]
WC	(Italy) F Baldi (Italy) A Virgili	6	4	[6]
3	(Germany) A Begemann (Belarus) A Bury	6	6
(Argentina) Juan Ignacio Galarza (Argentina) L Mayer	3	4
(Spain) P Martínez (France) G Sakharov	4	6	[3]
(Spain) D Gimeno-Traver (Spain) C Taberner	6	4	[10]
(Czech Republic) R Jebavý (Czech Republic) Z Kolář	6	6
(Czech Republic) J Mertl (Czech Republic) Libor Salaba	3	4
WC	(Italy) G Mager (Italy) L Sonego	7^{7}	4	[5]
4	(Italy) R Ghedin (Italy) A Motti	6^{5}	6	[10]
(Netherlands) M Vervoort (Serbia) Ilija Vučić	6	6^{5}	[10]
(Switzerland) L Margaroli (Austria) L Miedler	4	7^{7}	[3]
(Italy) M Cecchinato (Italy) M Donati	3	7^{8}	[10]
2	(Croatia) N Mektić (Croatia) A Šančić	6	6^{6}	[4]

Quarterfinals
1	(Chile) H Podlipnik (Slovakia) I Zelenay	7^{7}	6
WC	(Italy) E Eremin (Italy) G Quinzi	6^{4}	3
3	(Germany) A Begemann (Belarus) A Bury	6	6
(Spain) D Gimeno-Traver (Spain) C Taberner	1	2
(Czech Republic) R Jebavý (Czech Republic) Z Kolář	7	7
4	(Italy) R Ghedin (Italy) A Motti	5	5
(Netherlands) M Vervoort (Serbia) I Vučić	w/o
(Italy) M Cecchinato (Italy) M Donati

Semifinals
1	(Chile) H Podlipnik (Slovakia) I Zelenay	4	7^{7}	[6]
3	(Germany) A Begemann (Belarus) A Bury	6	6^{4}	[10]
(Czech Republic) R Jebavý (Czech Republic) Z Kolář	6	6
(Netherlands) M Vervoort (Serbia) I Vučić	3	2

Final
3	(Germany) A Begemann (Belarus) A Bury	5	6	[11]
(Czech Republic) R Jebavý (Czech Republic) Z Kolář	7	4	[9]
