= 2018 Internazionali di Tennis del Friuli Venezia Giulia =

Tennis tournament

- Date: 13–19 August
- Edition: 15th
- Category: Challenger Tour
- Surface: Clay / outdoor
- Location: Cordenons, Italy

Champions

Singles
- (Italy) Paolo Lorenzi

Doubles
- (Ukraine) Denys Molchanov / (Slovakia) Igor Zelenay
← 2017 ·	Internazionali di Tennis del Friuli Venezia Giulia	· 2019 →

The 2018 Internazionali di Tennis del Friuli Venezia Giulia was a professional tennis tournament played on clay courts. It was the fifteenth edition of the tournament which was part of the 2018 ATP Challenger Tour. It took place in Cordenons, Italy between 13 and 19 August 2018.

== Singles main-draw entrants ==
=== Seeds ===
Country	Player	Rank^{1}	Seed
ITA	Paolo Lorenzi	97	1
ARG	Facundo Bagnis	151	2
SVK	Andrej Martin	162	3
CRO	Nino Serdarušić	192	4
ESP	Tommy Robredo	208	5
CZE	Zdeněk Kolář	219	6
BRA	Guilherme Clezar	221	7
~~CRO~~	~~Viktor Galović~~	~~230~~	~~8~~

- ^{1} Rankings are as of 6 August 2018.

=== Other entrants ===
The following players received wildcards into the singles main draw:

- (Italy) Riccardo Balzerani
- (Italy) Jacopo Berrettini
- (Italy) Enrico Dalla Valle
- (Italy) Francesco Forti

The following player received entry into the singles main draw as an alternate:

- (Spain) Daniel Muñoz de la Nava

The following players received entry from the qualifying draw:

- (Italy) Riccardo Bonadio
- (France) Enzo Couacaud
- (Brazil) Daniel Dutra da Silva
- (Hungary) Máté Valkusz

The following player received entry as a lucky loser:

- (Sweden) Markus Eriksson

== Champions ==
=== Singles ===
- (Italy) Paolo Lorenzi def. (Hungary) Máté Valkusz 6–3, 3–6, 6–4.

=== Doubles ===
- (Ukraine) Denys Molchanov / (Slovakia) Igor Zelenay def. (Slovakia) Andrej Martin / (Spain) Daniel Muñoz de la Nava 3–6, 6–3, [11–9].
