= 2026 Internazionali di Tennis del Friuli Venezia Giulia – Men's doubles =

Men's doubles
- 2026 Internazionali di Tennis del Friuli Venezia Giulia

Final
- Champions: (Romania) Alexandru Jecan (Czech Republic) David Poljak
- Runners-up: (Republic of Ireland) Charles Barry (Bulgaria) Anthony Genov
- Score: 4–6, 7–6^{(7–4)}, [10–3]

Events
Singles	men	women
Doubles	men	women
- Internazionali di Tennis del Friuli Venezia Giulia

Andrew Paulson and Michael Vrbenský were the defending champions but chose not to defend their title.

Alexandru Jecan and David Poljak won the title after defeating Charles Barry and Anthony Genov 4–6, 7–6^{(7–4)}, [10–3] in the final.

== Seeds ==
1. (Germany) Tim Rühl / (Netherlands) Mick Veldheer (quarterfinals)
2. (India) Arjun Kadhe / (Brazil) Marcelo Zormann (first round)
3. (Romania) Alexandru Jecan / (Czech Republic) David Poljak (champions)
4. (Ukraine) Denys Molchanov / (India) Ramkumar Ramanathan (semifinals)

== Draw ==
Key

- Q = Qualifier
- WC = Wild card
- LL = Lucky loser
- Alt = Alternate
- ITF = ITF entry
- PR = Protected ranking
- SR = Special ranking
- SE = Special exempt
- JE = Junior exempt
- JR = Junior Accelerator Programme entrant
- CO = College Accelerator Programme entrant
- NG = Next Gen Accelerator Program entrant
- w/o = Walkover
- r = Retired
- d = Defaulted

First round
1	(Germany) T Rühl (Netherlands) M Veldheer	6	6
(Spain) M Mansilla Díez (Netherlands) M Vervoort	2	3
WC	(Italy) F Bondioli (Italy) CA Caniato	7	7
Kirill Mishkin; Vitali Shvets	5	5
3	(Romania) A Jecan (Czech Republic) D Poljak	6	4	[11]
(Italy) F Forti (Italy) G Ricca	3	6	[9]
(Italy) A Binda (North Macedonia) O Prihodko	6	3	[10]
WC	(Italy) Lorenzo Angelini (Italy) Gabriele Crivellaro	4	6	[7]
(Bulgaria) R Shandarov (Bulgaria) V Shandarov	4	1
(Australia) Je Delaney (Japan) Yamato Sueoka	6	6
(Ecuador) Á Guillén Meza (Argentina) G Villanueva	3	2
4	(Ukraine) D Molchanov (India) R Ramanathan	6	6
(Spain) M Alcalá Gurri (Uruguay) F Roncadelli	7^{7}	4	[10]
(Italy) F Agamenone (Italy) Lorenzo Lorusso	6^{0}	6	[6]
(Republic of Ireland) C Barry (Bulgaria) A Genov	6^{4}	6	[10]
2	(India) A Kadhe (Brazil) M Zormann	7^{7}	4	[7]

Quarterfinals
1	(Germany) T Rühl (Netherlands) M Veldheer	6^{5}	2
WC	(Italy) F Bondioli (Italy) CA Caniato	7^{7}	6
3	(Romania) A Jecan (Czech Republic) D Poljak	6	6
(Italy) A Binda (North Macedonia) O Prihodko	4	3
(Australia) Je Delaney (Japan) Y Sueoka	3	1
4	(Ukraine) D Molchanov (India) R Ramanathan	6	6
(Spain) M Alcalá Gurri (Uruguay) F Roncadelli
(Republic of Ireland) C Barry (Bulgaria) A Genov	w/o

Semifinals
WC	(Italy) F Bondioli (Italy) CA Caniato
3	(Romania) A Jecan (Czech Republic) D Poljak	w/o
4	(Ukraine) D Molchanov (India) R Ramanathan	2	3
(Republic of Ireland) C Barry (Bulgaria) A Genov	6	6

Final
3	(Romania) A Jecan (Czech Republic) D Poljak	4	7^{7}	[10]
(Republic of Ireland) C Barry (Bulgaria) A Genov	6	6^{4}	[3]
