= 2018 Internazionali di Tennis del Friuli Venezia Giulia – Singles =

Singles
- 2018 Internazionali di Tennis del Friuli Venezia Giulia

Final
- Champion: (Italy) Paolo Lorenzi
- Runner-up: (Hungary) Máté Valkusz
- Score: 6–3, 3–6, 6–4

Events
| Singles | Doubles |
- Internazionali di Tennis del Friuli Venezia Giulia

Elias Ymer was the defending champion but chose not to defend his title.

Paolo Lorenzi won the title after defeating Máté Valkusz 6–3, 3–6, 6–4 in the final.

== Seeds ==
1. (Italy) Paolo Lorenzi (champion)
2. (Argentina) Facundo Bagnis (quarterfinals)
3. (Slovakia) Andrej Martin (second round)
4. (Croatia) Nino Serdarušić (first round)
5. (Spain) Tommy Robredo (quarterfinals)
6. (Czech Republic) Zdeněk Kolář (quarterfinals)
7. (Brazil) Guilherme Clezar (semifinals)
8. (Croatia) Viktor Galović (withdrew)

== Draw ==
Key

- Q = Qualifier
- WC = Wild card
- LL = Lucky loser
- Alt = Alternate
- ITF = ITF entry
- PR = Protected ranking
- SR = Special ranking
- SE = Special exempt
- JE = Junior exempt
- JR = Junior Accelerator Programme entrant
- CO = College Accelerator Programme entrant
- NG = Next Gen Accelerator Program entrant
- w/o = Walkover
- r = Retired
- d = Defaulted

=== Finals ===
Semifinals
1 | (Italy) Paolo Lorenzi | 7^{11} | 7
(Portugal) João Domingues | 6^{9} | 5
Q | (Hungary) Máté Valkusz | 6 | 6
7 | (Brazil) Guilherme Clezar | 2 | 4

Final
1 | (Italy) Paolo Lorenzi | 6 | 3 | 6
Q | (Hungary) Máté Valkusz | 3 | 6 | 4

=== Top half ===
First round
1 | (Italy) P Lorenzi | 7 | 7^{7}
(Canada) S Diez | 5 | 6^{5}
Q | (Italy) R Bonadio | 6 | 2 | 1
(Italy) A Bega | 2 | 6 | 6
WC | (Italy) E Dalla Valle | 6 | 7
(Serbia) M Zekić | 2 | 5
(Italy) L Giustino | 6^{3} | 1
5 | (Spain) T Robredo | 7^{7} | 6
3 | (Slovakia) A Martin | 6^{6} | 7 | 6
(Bosnia and Herzegovina) A Šetkić | 7^{8} | 5 | 3
(Argentina) H Casanova | 0 | 2
(Portugal) J Domingues | 6 | 6
(Italy) A Basso | 7^{7} | 7
Alt | (Spain) D Muñoz de la Nava | 6^{1} | 5
(Italy) G Mager | 4 | 1
Q | (France) E Couacaud | 6 | 6

Second round
1 | (Italy) P Lorenzi | 6 | 6
(Italy) A Bega | 4 | 3
WC | (Italy) E Dalla Valle | 3 | 0^{r}
5 | (Spain) T Robredo | 6 | 0
3 | (Slovakia) A Martin | 4 | 6 | 1
(Portugal) J Domingues | 6 | 3 | 6
(Italy) A Basso | 6 | 6^{6} | 3
Q | (France) E Couacaud | 4 | 7^{8} | 6

Quarterfinals
1 | (Italy) P Lorenzi | 6 | 6
5 | (Spain) T Robredo | 3 | 3
(Portugal) J Domingues | 6 | 6
Q | (France) E Couacaud | 2 | 1

Semifinals
1 | (Italy) P Lorenzi | 7^{11} | 7
(Portugal) J Domingues | 6^{9} | 5

=== Bottom half ===
First round
6 | (Czech Republic) Z Kolář | 6 | 6
(Spain) C Gómez-Herrera | 3 | 4
Q | (Brazil) D Dutra da Silva | 5 | 6 | 0^{r}
WC | (Italy) F Forti | 7 | 1 | 5
(Portugal) G Oliveira | 4 | 4
Q | (Hungary) M Valkusz | 6 | 6
LL | (Sweden) M Eriksson | 6 | 6
4 | (Croatia) N Serdarušić | 3 | 1
7 | (Brazil) G Clezar | 6 | 7
WC | (Italy) Riccardo Balzerani | 2 | 5
(Argentina) P Cachin | 3 | 6 | 6
WC | (Italy) J Berrettini | 6 | 1 | 2
(Italy) A Pellegrino | 6^{7} | 6 | 6
(Lithuania) L Grigelis | 7^{9} | 2 | 4
(Italy) M Viola | 0 | 2
2 | (Argentina) F Bagnis | 6 | 6

Second round
6 | (Czech Republic) Z Kolář | 6 | 6
WC | (Italy) F Forti | 1 | 4
Q | (Hungary) M Valkusz | 6 | 6
LL | (Sweden) M Eriksson | 0 | 1
7 | (Brazil) G Clezar | 6 | 6
(Argentina) P Cachin | 2 | 4
(Italy) A Pellegrino | 5 | 5
2 | (Argentina) F Bagnis | 7 | 7

Quarterfinals
6 | (Czech Republic) Z Kolář | 0 | 0
Q | (Hungary) M Valkusz | 6 | 6
7 | (Brazil) G Clezar | 6 | 4 | 6
2 | (Argentina) F Bagnis | 4 | 6 | 2

Semifinals
Q | (Hungary) M Valkusz | 6 | 6
7 | (Brazil) G Clezar | 2 | 4
