= 2012 Zucchetti Kos Tennis Cup – Singles =

Men's tennis tournament

Singles
- 2012 Zucchetti Kos Tennis Cup

Final
- Champion: (Italy) Paolo Lorenzi
- Runner-up: (Spain) Daniel Gimeno-Traver
- Score: 7–6^{(7–5)}, 6–3

Events
Singles	Doubles
← 2011 ·	Zucchetti Kos Tennis Cup	· 2013 →

Daniel Muñoz-de la Nava was the defending champion, but lost in the second round.
Paolo Lorenzi won the title, defeating Daniel Gimeno-Traver 7–6^{(7–5)}, 6–3 in the final.

== Seeds ==
1. (Slovenia) Blaž Kavčič (quarterfinals)
2. (Spain) Guillermo García-López (first round)
3. (Italy) Filippo Volandri (semifinals, retired because of a right shoulder injury)
4. (Italy) Paolo Lorenzi (champion)
5. (Italy) Simone Bolelli (quarterfinals, retired because of a right shoulder injury)
6. (Romania) Adrian Ungur (first round)
7. (Spain) Daniel Gimeno-Traver (finals)
8. (Brazil) Rogério Dutra da Silva (second round)

== Draw ==
=== Key ===
- Q = Qualifier
- WC = Wild card
- LL = Lucky loser
- Alt = Alternate
- SE = Special exempt
- PR = Protected ranking
- ITF = ITF entry
- JE = Junior exempt
- w/o = Walkover
- r = Retired
- d = Defaulted
- SR = Special ranking

=== Finals ===
Semifinals
7	(Spain) Daniel Gimeno-Traver	6	4
3	(Italy) Filippo Volandri	2	3^{r}
4	(Italy) Paolo Lorenzi	3	6	6
(Romania) Victor Hănescu	6	3	3

Final
7	(Spain) Daniel Gimeno-Traver	6^{5}	3
4	(Italy) Paolo Lorenzi	7^{7}	6

=== Top half ===
First round
1	(Slovenia) B Kavčič	4	6	6
SE	(Serbia) I Bozoljac	6	1	3
(Portugal) J Sousa	5	2
(Russia) A Kuznetsov	7	6
(Bosnia and Herzegovina) D Džumhur	4	6^{2}
WC	(Kazakhstan) E Korolev	6	7^{7}
Q	(Colombia) A González	5	3
7	(Spain) D Gimeno-Traver	7	6
3	(Italy) F Volandri	6	6
(Slovakia) P Červenák	3	2
(Spain) D Muñoz-de la Nava	6^{5}	6	6
(France) K de Schepper	7^{7}	4	3
(Argentina) M Alund	6	1	3
(Spain) I Cervantes	3	6	6
(Spain) A Montañés	6	2	7^{7}
6	(Romania) A Ungur	3	6	6^{3}

Second round
1	(Slovenia) B Kavčič	7	7^{7}
(Russia) A Kuznetsov	5	6^{5}
WC	(Kazakhstan) E Korolev	0	0^{r}
7	(Spain) D Gimeno-Traver	6	3
3	(Italy) F Volandri	6	6
(Spain) D Muñoz-de la Nava	3	3
(Spain) I Cervantes	5	1
(Spain) A Montañés	7	6

Quarterfinals
1	(Slovenia) B Kavčič	7	4	4
7	(Spain) D Gimeno-Traver	5	6	6
3	(Italy) F Volandri	6	6
(Spain) A Montañés	1	4

Semifinals
7	(Spain) D Gimeno-Traver	6	4
3	(Italy) F Volandri	2	3^{r}

=== Bottom half ===
First round
5	(Italy) S Bolelli	7	6
(Netherlands) T Schoorel	5	1
(Italy) A Giannessi	3	1
(Italy) G Naso	6	6
Q	(Belarus) A Bury	4	2
Q	(Italy) M Cecchinato	6	6
WC	(Italy) L Giustino	4	4
4	(Italy) P Lorenzi	6	6
8	(Brazil) R Dutra da Silva	6	6
Q	(Greece) T Angelinos	2	4
(Romania) V Hănescu	7^{7}	6
WC	(Chile) N Massú	6^{3}	4
WC	(Italy) R Bonadio	3	1
(Italy) M Viola	6	6
(Netherlands) T de Bakker	3	6	7^{7}
2	(Spain) G García-López	6	4	6^{2}

Second round
5	(Italy) S Bolelli	7	2	6
(Italy) G Naso	5	6	3
Q	(Italy) M Cecchinato	1	2
4	(Italy) P Lorenzi	6	6
8	(Brazil) R Dutra da Silva	4	6	4
(Romania) V Hănescu	6	4	6
(Italy) M Viola	6	6^{4}	6
(Netherlands) T de Bakker	2	7^{7}	2

Quarterfinals
5	(Italy) S Bolelli	5	0^{r}
4	(Italy) P Lorenzi	7	1
(Romania) V Hănescu	7	6
(Italy) M Viola	5	1

Semifinals
4	(Italy) P Lorenzi	3	6	6
(Romania) V Hănescu	6	3	3
