= 2011 Zucchetti Kos Tennis Cup =

- Date: 15–21 August
- Edition: 8th
- Location: Cordenons, Italy

Champions

Singles
- (Spain) Daniel Muñoz de la Nava

Doubles
- (Austria) Julian Knowle / (Germany) Michael Kohlmann
← 2010 ·	Zucchetti Kos Tennis Cup	· 2012 →

The 2011 Zucchetti Kos Tennis Cup was a professional tennis tournament played on clay courts. It was the eighth edition of the tournament which is part of the Tretorn SERIE+ of the 2011 ATP Challenger Tour. It took place in Cordenons, Italy between 15 and 21 August 2011.

== ATP entrants ==
=== Seeds ===
Country	Player	Rank^{1}	Seed
FRA	Éric Prodon	88	1
GER	Dustin Brown	122	2
CZE	Jaroslav Pospíšil	127	3
FRA	Florent Serra	129	4
ITA	Simone Bolelli	135	5
NED	Jesse Huta Galung	136	6
GER	Björn Phau	137	7
SVK	Martin Kližan	138	8

- ^{1} Rankings are as of August 8, 2011.

=== Other entrants ===
The following players received wildcards into the singles main draw:

- (Italy) Riccardo Bonadio
- (Italy) Alessandro Giannessi
- (Austria) Thomas Muster
- (Italy) Matteo Trevisan

The following players received entry from the qualifying draw:

- (Monaco) Benjamin Balleret
- (Belgium) Niels Desein
- (Brazil) Leonardo Kirche
- (Serbia) Boris Pašanski

== Champions ==
=== Singles ===
(Spain) Daniel Muñoz de la Nava def. (Argentina) Nicolás Pastor 6–4, 2–6, 6–2

=== Doubles ===
(Austria) Julian Knowle / (Germany) Michael Kohlmann def. (Australia) Colin Ebelthite / (Australia) Adam Feeney, 2–6, 7–5, [10–5]
