= 2021 Internazionali di Tennis del Friuli Venezia Giulia =

- Date: 2–8 August
- Edition: 18th
- Category: ATP Challenger Tour
- Surface: Clay / outdoor
- Location: Cordenons, Italy

Champions

Singles
- (Argentina) Francisco Cerúndolo

Doubles
- (Brazil) Orlando Luz / (Brazil) Rafael Matos
← 2020 ·	Internazionali di Tennis del Friuli Venezia Giulia	· 2022 →

The 2021 Internazionali di Tennis del Friuli Venezia Giulia was a professional tennis tournament played on clay courts. It was the 18th edition of the tournament which was part of the 2021 ATP Challenger Tour. It took place in Cordenons, Italy between 2 and 8 August 2021.

== Singles main-draw entrants ==
=== Seeds ===
Country	Player	Rank^{1}	Seed
ITA	Stefano Travaglia	88	1
FRA	Gilles Simon	102	2
ARG	Francisco Cerúndolo	118	3
PER	Juan Pablo Varillas	125	4
BOL	Hugo Dellien	140	5
FRA	Antoine Hoang	145	6
ARG	Juan Manuel Cerúndolo	146	7
ITA	Federico Gaio	149	8

- ^{1} Rankings are as of 26 July 2021.

=== Other entrants ===
The following players received wildcards into the singles main draw:

- (Italy) Filippo Baldi
- (Italy) Riccardo Bonadio
- (Italy) Luca Nardi

The following player received entry into the singles main draw as a special exempt:

- (Argentina) Thiago Agustín Tirante

The following player received entry into the singles main draw as an alternate:

- (Russia) Pavel Kotov

The following players received entry from the qualifying draw:

- (Italy) Francesco Forti
- (Colombia) Alejandro González
- (Argentina) Camilo Ugo Carabelli
- (Italy) Giulio Zeppieri

== Champions ==
=== Singles ===
- (Argentina) Francisco Cerúndolo def. (Argentina) Tomás Martín Etcheverry 6–1, 6–2.

=== Doubles ===
- (Brazil) Orlando Luz / (Brazil) Rafael Matos def. (Peru) Sergio Galdós / (Argentina) Renzo Olivo 6–4, 7–6^{(7–5)}.
