= 2010 Zucchetti Kos Tennis Cup =

- Date: July 26 – August 1
- Edition: 7th
- Location: Cordenons, Italy

Champions

Singles
- (Belgium) Steve Darcis

Doubles
- (Netherlands) Robin Haase / (Netherlands) Rogier Wassen
← 2009 ·	Zucchetti Kos Tennis Cup	· 2011 →

The 2010 Zucchetti Kos Tennis Cup was a professional tennis tournament played on outdoor red clay courts. It was the seventh edition of the tournament which was part of the Tretorn SERIE+ of the 2010 ATP Challenger Tour. It took place in Cordenons, Italy between 26 July and 1 August 2010.

== ATP entrants ==
=== Seeds ===
Nationality	Player	Ranking*	Seeding
ARG	Carlos Berlocq	101	1
POR	Rui Machado	123	2
AUT	Daniel Köllerer	124	3
AUT	Martin Fischer	128	4
FRA	Édouard Roger-Vasselin	129	5
ROU	Adrian Ungur	131	6
ESP	Albert Ramos-Viñolas	140	7
BEL	Steve Darcis	142	8

- Rankings are as of July 19, 2010.

=== Other entrants ===
The following players received wildcards into the singles main draw:

- (Germany) Jeremy Jahn
- (Austria) Daniel Köllerer
- (Belgium) Christophe Rochus
- (Romania) Adrian Ungur

The following players received entry from the qualifying draw:

- (Italy) Massimo Bosa
- (Slovakia) Andrej Martin
- (Italy) Gianluca Naso
- (Netherlands) Thomas Schoorel

== Champions ==
=== Singles ===
(Belgium) Steve Darcis def. (Spain) Daniel Muñoz-de la Nava, 6–2, 6–4

=== Doubles ===
(Netherlands) Robin Haase / (Netherlands) Rogier Wassen def. (United States) James Cerretani / (Canada) Adil Shamasdin, 7–6(14), 7–5
