= 2011 Zucchetti Kos Tennis Cup – Singles =

Singles
- 2011 Zucchetti Kos Tennis Cup

Final
- Champion: (Spain) Daniel Muñoz-de la Nava
- Runner-up: (Argentina) Nicolás Pastor
- Score: 6–4, 2–6, 6–2

Events
Singles	Doubles
← 2010 ·	Zucchetti Kos Tennis Cup	· 2012 →

Steve Darcis was the defending champion but decided not to participate.

Daniel Muñoz-de la Nava won this tournament, beating Nicolás Pastor 6–4, 2–6, 6–2 in the final.

== Seeds ==
1. (France) Éric Prodon (second round)
2. (Germany) Dustin Brown (quarterfinals)
3. (Czech Republic) Jaroslav Pospíšil (first round)
4. (France) Florent Serra (second round)
5. (Italy) Simone Bolelli (quarterfinals)
6. (Netherlands) Jesse Huta Galung (second round)
7. (Germany) Björn Phau (withdrew due to back injury)
8. (Slovakia) Martin Kližan (semifinals)

== Draw ==
=== Key ===
- Q = Qualifier
- WC = Wild card
- LL = Lucky loser
- Alt = Alternate
- SE = Special exempt
- PR = Protected ranking
- ITF = ITF entry
- JE = Junior exempt
- w/o = Walkover
- r = Retired
- d = Defaulted
- SR = Special ranking

=== Finals ===
Semifinals
(Italy) Alessandro Giannessi	6	4	6^{4}
(Spain) Daniel Muñoz-de la Nava	3	6	7^{7}
LL	(Argentina) Nicolás Pastor	6	6
8	(Slovakia) Martin Kližan	1	2

Final
(Spain) Daniel Muñoz-de la Nava	6	2	6
LL	(Argentina) Nicolás Pastor	4	6	2

=== Top half ===
First round
1	(France) É Prodon	7	3	6
(Kazakhstan) Y Schukin	5	6	3
WC	(Italy) M Trevisan	4	4
(Italy) A Giannessi	6	6
Q	(Serbia) B Pašanski	3	3
(Hungary) A Balázs	6	6
(Croatia) K Mesaroš	3	4
6	(Netherlands) J Huta Galung	6	6
4	(France) F Serra	6	6
Q	(Monaco) B Balleret	4	3
(Czech Republic) I Minář	6^{4}	4
(Spain) D Muñoz-de la Nava	7^{7}	6
(Germany) S Greul	6	2	7
(Belarus) U Ignatik	1	6	5
(Romania) A Ungur	7^{8}	3	4
5	(Italy) S Bolelli	6^{6}	6	6

Second round
1	(France) É Prodon	2	3
(Italy) A Giannessi	6	6
(Hungary) A Balázs	6	3	6
6	(Netherlands) J Huta Galung	3	6	4
4	(France) F Serra	4	2
(Spain) D Muñoz-de la Nava	6	6
(Germany) S Greul	4	3
5	(Italy) S Bolelli	6	6

Quarterfinals
(Italy) A Giannessi	6	3	6
(Hungary) A Balázs	3	6	3
(Spain) D Muñoz-de la Nava	7^{10}	6
5	(Italy) S Bolelli	6^{8}	3

Semifinals
(Italy) A Giannessi	6	4	6^{4}
(Spain) D Muñoz-de la Nava	3	6	7^{7}

=== Bottom half ===
First round
LL	(Argentina) Nicolás Pastor	6	7^{7}
WC	(Italy) R Bonadio	3	6^{2}
(Italy) S Galvani	6	6
WC	(Austria) T Muster	0	3
(Spain) R Ramírez Hidalgo	5	6	3
(Italy) A di Mauro	7	2	6
(Romania) V Crivoi	2	7^{13}	6
3	(Czech Republic) J Pospíšil	6	6^{11}	1
8	(Slovakia) M Kližan	6	6
Q	(Brazil) L Kirche	4	4
(Italy) M Viola	0	4
(Italy) M Crugnola	6	6
Q	(Belgium) N Desein	6	2	5
(Czech Republic) J Hájek	4	6	7
(Italy) A Arnaboldi	3	2
2	(Germany) D Brown	6	6

Second round
LL	(Argentina) Nicolás Pastor	6^{6}	6	3
(Italy) S Galvani	7^{8}	4	0^{r}
(Italy) A di Mauro	6	2	6^{4}
(Romania) V Crivoi	4	6	7^{7}
8	(Slovakia) M Kližan	6	6
(Italy) M Crugnola	4	2
(Czech Republic) J Hájek	3	2
2	(Germany) D Brown	6	6

Quarterfinals
LL	(Argentina) Nicolás Pastor	6	6
(Romania) V Crivoi	2	3
8	(Slovakia) M Kližan	3	6	6
2	(Germany) D Brown	6	4	0

Semifinals
LL	(Argentina) Nicolás Pastor	6	6
8	(Slovakia) M Kližan	1	2
