= 2009 Zucchetti Kos Tennis Cup =

- Date: August 10 – August 16
- Edition: 6th
- Location: Cordenons, Italy

Champions

Singles
- (Australia) Peter Luczak

Doubles
- (United States) James Cerretani / (United States) Travis Rettenmaier
← 2008 ·	Zucchetti Kos Tennis Cup	· 2010 →

The 2009 Zucchetti Kos Tennis Cup was a professional tennis tournament played on outdoor red clay courts. It was the sixth edition of the tournament which was part of the Tretorn SERIE+ of the 2009 ATP Challenger Tour. It took place in Cordenons, Italy between 10 and 16 August 2009.

== Singles entrants ==
=== Seeds ===
Nationality	Player	Ranking*	Seeding
BRA	~~Marcos Daniel~~	~~58~~	~~1~~
BEL	Christophe Rochus	61	2
AUT	Daniel Köllerer	78	3
ROU	Victor Crivoi	79	4
BEL	Olivier Rochus	83	5
ESP	Óscar Hernández	87	6
ESP	Alberto Martín	96	7
AUS	Peter Luczak	102	8
ARG	Brian Dabul	104	9

- Rankings are as of August 3, 2009.

=== Other entrants ===
The following players received wildcards into the singles main draw:

- (Italy) Daniele Bracciali
- (Argentina) Gastón Gaudio
- (Germany) Jeremy Jahn

The following players received entry from the qualifying draw:

- (Spain) Pablo Martín-Adalia
- (France) Benoît Paire
- (Italy) Matteo Trevisan
- (Romania) Adrian Ungur
- (South Korea) Daniel Yoo (as a Lucky Loser)

== Champions ==
=== Singles ===
(Australia) Peter Luczak def. (Belgium) Olivier Rochus, 6–3, 3–6, 6–1

=== Doubles ===
(United States) James Cerretani / (United States) Travis Rettenmaier def. (Australia) Peter Luczak / (Italy) Alessandro Motti, 4–6, 6–3, [11–9]
