= 2012 Zucchetti Kos Tennis Cup – Doubles =

Doubles
- 2012 Zucchetti Kos Tennis Cup

Final
- Champions: (Czech Republic) Lukáš Dlouhý (Slovakia) Michal Mertiňák
- Runners-up: (Germany) Philipp Marx (Romania) Florin Mergea
- Score: 5–7, 7–5, [10–7]

Events
Singles	Doubles
← 2011 ·	Zucchetti Kos Tennis Cup	· 2013 →

Julian Knowle and Michael Kohlmann were the defending champions, but decided not to participate.
Lukáš Dlouhý and Michal Mertiňák won the title, defeating Philipp Marx and Florin Mergea 5–7, 7–5, [10–7] in the final.

== Seeds ==
1. (Belgium) Dick Norman / (Germany) Alexander Waske (first round)
2. (United States) Nicholas Monroe / (Germany) Simon Stadler (quarterfinals)
3. (Sweden) Johan Brunström / (Australia) Colin Ebelthite (semifinals)
4. (Czech Republic) Lukáš Dlouhý / (Slovakia) Michal Mertiňák (champions)

== Draw ==
=== Key ===
- Q = Qualifier
- WC = Wild card
- LL = Lucky loser
- Alt = Alternate
- SE = Special exempt
- PR = Protected ranking
- ITF = ITF entry
- JE = Junior exempt
- w/o = Walkover
- r = Retired
- d = Defaulted
- SR = Special ranking

=== Draw ===
First round
1	(Belgium) D Norman (Germany) A Waske	1	6	[8]
(Germany) M Emmrich (Australia) R Junaid	6	3	[10]
(Romania) V Hănescu (Romania) A Ungur	2	6	[10]
(Poland) T Bednarek (France) O Charroin	6	2	[7]
4	(Czech Republic) L Dlouhý (Slovakia) M Mertiňák	6	6
Alt	(Belarus) A Bury (Russia) A Kuznetsov	1	2
WC	(Italy) G Naso (Italy) M Navarra	7	1	[8]
(Italy) S Ianni (India) P Raja	5	6	[10]
WC	(Italy) R Bonadio (Chile) N Massú	3	2
(Germany) A Begemann (Slovakia) I Zelenay	6	6
(Argentina) M Alund (Brazil) R Dutra da Silva	1	1
3	(Sweden) J Brunström (Australia) C Ebelthite	6	6
(Italy) A Giannessi (Portugal) J Sousa	6^{5}	4
(Germany) P Marx (Romania) F Mergea	7^{7}	6
WC	(Italy) Simone Appio (Italy) Mauro Commisso	1	4
2	(United States) N Monroe (Germany) S Stadler	6	6

Quarterfinals
(Germany) M Emmrich (Australia) R Junaid	3	6	[4]
(Romania) V Hănescu (Romania) A Ungur	6	2	[10]
4	(Czech Republic) L Dlouhý (Slovakia) M Mertiňák	6	7^{12}
(Italy) S Ianni (India) P Raja	2	6^{10}
(Germany) A Begemann (Slovakia) I Zelenay	4	7	[9]
3	(Sweden) J Brunström (Australia) C Ebelthite	6	5	[11]
(Germany) P Marx (Romania) F Mergea	6	6^{1}	[10]
2	(United States) N Monroe (Germany) S Stadler	2	7^{7}	[6]

Semifinals
(Romania) V Hănescu (Romania) A Ungur	6	2	[2]
4	(Czech Republic) L Dlouhý (Slovakia) M Mertiňák	3	6	[10]
3	(Sweden) J Brunström (Australia) C Ebelthite	3	2
(Germany) P Marx (Romania) F Mergea	6	6

Final
4	(Czech Republic) L Dlouhý (Slovakia) M Mertiňák	5	7	[10]
(Germany) P Marx (Romania) F Mergea	7	5	[7]
