= 2021 Internazionali di Tennis del Friuli Venezia Giulia – Singles =

Singles
- 2021 Internazionali di Tennis del Friuli Venezia Giulia

Final
- Champion: (Argentina) Francisco Cerúndolo
- Runner-up: (Argentina) Tomás Martín Etcheverry
- Score: 6–1, 6–2

Events
Singles	Doubles
← 2020 ·	Internazionali di Tennis del Friuli Venezia Giulia	· 2022 →

Bernabé Zapata Miralles was the defending champion but chose not to defend his title.

Francisco Cerúndolo won the title after defeating Tomás Martín Etcheverry 6–1, 6–2 in the final.

== Seeds ==
1. (Italy) Stefano Travaglia (quarterfinals)
2. (France) Gilles Simon (first round)
3. (Argentina) Francisco Cerúndolo (champion)
4. (Peru) Juan Pablo Varillas (quarterfinals)
5. (Bolivia) Hugo Dellien (first round)
6. (France) Antoine Hoang (first round)
7. (Argentina) Juan Manuel Cerúndolo (first round)
8. (Italy) Federico Gaio (second round)

== Draw ==
=== Key ===
- Q = Qualifier
- WC = Wild card
- LL = Lucky loser
- Alt = Alternate
- SE = Special exempt
- PR = Protected ranking
- ITF = ITF entry
- JE = Junior exempt
- w/o = Walkover
- r = Retired
- d = Defaulted
- SR = Special ranking

=== Finals ===
Semifinals
(Argentina) Andrea Collarini	2	6	1
3	(Argentina) Francisco Cerúndolo	6	3	6
(Argentina) Tomás Martín Etcheverry	6	1	6
(Switzerland) Marc-Andrea Hüsler	3	6	3

Final
3	(Argentina) Francisco Cerúndolo	6	6
(Argentina) Tomás Martín Etcheverry	1	2

=== Top half ===
First round
1	(Italy) S Travaglia	6	6
Alt	(Russia) P Kotov	1	2
(France) Q Halys	4	6^{5}
SE	(Argentina) TA Tirante	6	7^{7}
WC	(Italy) L Nardi	0	3
Q	(Italy) F Forti	6	6
(Argentina) A Collarini	6	7
6	(France) A Hoang	4	5
3	(Argentina) F Cerúndolo	6	6
Q	(Colombia) A González	4	2
(Italy) L Giustino	6^{2}	6	6
WC	(Italy) F Baldi	7^{7}	4	2
(Italy) A Pellegrino	7	6^{2}	6^{3}
Q	(Italy) G Zeppieri	5	7^{7}	7^{7}
WC	(Italy) R Bonadio	6	3	6
7	(Argentina) JM Cerúndolo	0	6	2

Second round
1	(Italy) S Travaglia	6^{7}	6	6
SE	(Argentina) TA Tirante	7^{9}	3	4
Q	(Italy) F Forti	1	3
(Argentina) A Collarini	6	6
3	(Argentina) F Cerúndolo	6	6
(Italy) L Giustino	3	3
Q	(Italy) G Zeppieri	6	6
WC	(Italy) R Bonadio	3	2

Quarterfinals
1	(Italy) S Travaglia	1	2
(Argentina) A Collarini	6	6
3	(Argentina) F Cerúndolo	6	4	6
Q	(Italy) G Zeppieri	1	6	3

Semifinals
(Argentina) A Collarini	2	6	1
3	(Argentina) F Cerúndolo	6	3	6

=== Bottom half ===
First round
8	(Italy) F Gaio	6	3	6
(Brazil) F Meligeni Alves	3	6	3
(Argentina) TM Etcheverry	5	7^{7}	7
(Argentina) R Olivo	7	6^{3}	5
(Czech Republic) Z Kolář	6	6
(Italy) P Lorenzi	2	0
(Chile) A Tabilo	4	4
4	(Peru) JP Varillas	6	6
5	(Bolivia) H Dellien	6^{4}	0
Q	(Argentina) C Ugo Carabelli	7^{7}	6
(Switzerland) M-A Hüsler	6	6
(Italy) R Marcora	4	4
(Brazil) J Menezes	6	4	1
(Chile) MT Barrios Vera	3	6	6
(Italy) GM Moroni	7^{7}	6
2	(France) G Simon	6^{4}	4

Second round
8	(Italy) F Gaio	4	3
(Argentina) TM Etcheverry	6	6
(Czech Republic) Z Kolář	3	7^{7}	6^{2}
4	(Peru) JP Varillas	6	6^{5}	7^{7}
Q	(Argentina) C Ugo Carabelli	4	3
(Switzerland) M-A Hüsler	6	6
(Chile) MT Barrios Vera	6	7^{7}
(Italy) GM Moroni	4	6^{5}

Quarterfinals
(Argentina) TM Etcheverry	6	2	7
4	(Peru) JP Varillas	2	6	5
(Switzerland) M-A Hüsler	6	6^{0}	6
(Chile) MT Barrios Vera	1	7^{7}	4

Semifinals
(Argentina) TM Etcheverry	6	1	6
(Switzerland) M-A Hüsler	3	6	3
