= 2012 Zucchetti Kos Tennis Cup =

- Date: 13 – 19 August
- Edition: 9th
- Location: Cordenons, Italy

Champions

Singles
- (Italy) Paolo Lorenzi

Doubles
- (Czech Republic) Lukáš Dlouhý / (Slovakia) Michal Mertiňák
← 2011 ·	Zucchetti Kos Tennis Cup	· 2013 →

The 2012 Zucchetti Kos Tennis Cup was a professional tennis tournament played on clay courts. It was the ninth edition of the tournament which was part of the Tretorn SERIE+ of the 2012 ATP Challenger Tour. It took place in Cordenons, Italy between 13 and 19 August 2012.

== Singles main draw entrants ==
=== Seeds ===
Country	Player	Rank^{1}	Seed
SLO	Blaž Kavčič	68	1
ESP	Guillermo García López	71	2
ITA	Filippo Volandri	81	3
ITA	Paolo Lorenzi	94	4
ITA	Simone Bolelli	103	5
ROU	Adrian Ungur	105	6
ESP	Daniel Gimeno Traver	109	4
BRA	Rogério Dutra da Silva	115	5

- ^{1} Rankings are as of August 6, 2012.

=== Other entrants ===
The following players received wildcards into the singles main draw:

- (Italy) Riccardo Bonadio
- (Italy) Lorenzo Giustino
- (Kazakhstan) Evgeny Korolev
- (Chile) Nicolás Massú

The following players was given a special exempt into the singles main draw:

- (Serbia) Ilija Bozoljac

The following players received entry from the qualifying draw:

- (Greece) Theodoros Angelinos
- (Belarus) Aliaksandr Bury
- (Italy) Marco Cecchinato
- (Colombia) Alejandro González

== Champions ==
=== Singles ===
- (Italy) Paolo Lorenzi def. (Spain) Daniel Gimeno Traver, 7–6^{(7–5)}, 6–3

=== Doubles ===
- (Czech Republic) Lukáš Dlouhý / (Slovakia) Michal Mertiňák def. (Germany) Philipp Marx / (Romania) Florin Mergea, 5–7, 7–5, [10–7]
