= 2016 Internazionali di Tennis del Friuli Venezia Giulia =

- Date: 15–21 August
- Edition: 13th
- Category: Challenger Tour
- Surface: Clay / outdoor
- Location: Cordenons, Italy

Champions

Singles
- (Japan) Taro Daniel

Doubles
- (Germany) Andre Begemann / (Belarus) Aliaksandr Bury
← 2015 ·	Internazionali di Tennis del Friuli Venezia Giulia	· 2017 →

The 2016 Internazionali di Tennis del Friuli Venezia Giulia was a professional tennis tournament played on clay courts. It was the thirteenth edition of the tournament which was part of the 2016 ATP Challenger Tour. It took place in Cordenons, Italy between 15 and 21 August 2016.

== Singles main-draw entrants ==
=== Seeds ===
Country	Player	Rank^{1}	Seed
ITA	Paolo Lorenzi	41	1
JPN	Taro Daniel	117	2
ARG	Leonardo Mayer	125	3
ESP	Daniel Gimeno Traver	126	4
SLO	Grega Žemlja	139	5
ITA	Marco Cecchinato	140	6
SWE	Elias Ymer	146	7
SRB	Filip Krajinović	148	8

- ^{1} Rankings are as of August 8, 2016.

=== Other entrants ===
The following players received wildcards into the singles main draw:

- (Italy) Paolo Lorenzi
- (Italy) Gianluca Mager
- (Italy) Gianluigi Quinzi
- (Italy) Matteo Donati

The following player received entry into the singles main draw using a protected ranking:

- (Brazil) Fabiano de Paula

The following player entered as an alternate:

- (Czech Republic) Jan Mertl

The following players received entry from the qualifying draw:

- (Argentina) Andrea Collarini
- (Croatia) Antonio Šančić
- (Spain) Carlos Taberner
- (Italy) Walter Trusendi

The following player received entry as a lucky loser:

- (France) Sadio Doumbia

== Champions ==
=== Singles ===
- (Japan) Taro Daniel def. (Spain) Daniel Gimeno Traver, 6–3, 6–4

=== Doubles ===
- (Germany) Andre Begemann / (Belarus) Aliaksandr Bury def. (Czech Republic) Roman Jebavý / (Czech Republic) Zdeněk Kolář, 5–7, 6–4, [11–9]
