= 2019 Internazionali di Tennis del Friuli Venezia Giulia =

- Date: 5–11 August (women); 12–18 August (men)
- Edition: 16th (men); 4th (women)
- Category: ATP Challenger Tour; ITF Women's World Tennis Tour
- Surface: Clay / outdoor
- Location: Cordenons, Italy

Champions

Men's singles
- (Australia) Christopher O'Connell

Women's singles
- (Netherlands) Arantxa Rus

Men's doubles
- (Bosnia and Herzegovina) Tomislav Brkić / (Croatia) Ante Pavić

Women's doubles
- (Slovenia) Veronika Erjavec / (Slovenia) Nika Radišič
- Internazionali di Tennis del Friuli Venezia Giulia

The 2019 Internazionali di Tennis del Friuli Venezia Giulia was a professional tennis tournament played on clay courts. It was the sixteenth (men) and fourth (women) editions of the tournament which was part of the 2019 ATP Challenger Tour and the 2019 ITF Women's World Tennis Tour. It took place in Cordenons, Italy between 5 and 18 August 2019.

== Men's singles main-draw entrants ==
=== Seeds ===
Country	Player	Rank^{1}	Seed
ITA	Paolo Lorenzi	126	1
SVK	Andrej Martin	136	2
HUN	Attila Balázs	137	3
FIN	Emil Ruusuvuori	237	4
CHI	Alejandro Tabilo	240	5
SLO	Blaž Kavčič	243	6
AUS	Aleksandar Vukic	261	7
~~POR~~	~~Gonçalo Oliveira~~	~~264~~	~~8~~
KAZ	Dmitry Popko	265	9
CRO	Nino Serdarušić	275	10
ITA	Gian Marco Moroni	276	11
ARG	Renzo Olivo	278	12
SVK	Alex Molčan	282	13
SWE	Markus Eriksson	298	14
ARG	Francisco Cerúndolo	299	15
CHI	Marcelo Tomás Barrios Vera	302	16

- ^{1} Rankings are as of 5 August 2019.

=== Other entrants ===
The following players received wildcards into the singles main draw:

- (Italy) Federico Arnaboldi
- (Italy) Riccardo Balzerani
- (Italy) Enrico Dalla Valle
- (Italy) Giovanni Fonio
- (Italy) Gianluigi Quinzi

The following player received entry into the singles main draw as an alternate:

- (Brazil) Orlando Luz

The following players received entry into the singles main draw using their ITF World Tennis Ranking:

- (Argentina) Francisco Cerúndolo
- (Sweden) Markus Eriksson
- (Brazil) Felipe Meligeni Alves
- (Australia) Christopher O'Connell
- (China) Sun Fajing

The following players received entry from the qualifying draw:

- (France) Fabien Reboul
- (Russia) Evgenii Tiurnev

The following player received entry as a lucky loser:

- (Italy) Nicolò Inserra

== Women's singles main-draw entrants ==
=== Seeds ===
Country	Player	Rank^{1}	Seed
NED	Arantxa Rus	120	1
GBR	Francesca Jones	304	2
ITA	Jessica Pieri	329	3
ITA	Martina Caregaro	350	4
ITA	Gaia Sanesi	352	5
ITA	Cristiana Ferrando	357	6
ITA	Stefania Rubini	358	7
ITA	Bianca Turati	364	8

- ^{1} Rankings are as of 29 July 2019.

=== Other entrants ===
The following players received wildcards into the singles main draw:

- (Italy) Corinna Dentoni
- (France) Magalie Girard
- (Italy) Anastasia Piangerelli
- (Italy) Federica Sacco

The following players received entry into the singles main draw using their ITF World Tennis Ranking:

- (Bulgaria) Dia Evtimova
- (Romania) Ioana Gașpar
- (Romania) Ilona Georgiana Ghioroaie
- (Hungary) Vanda Lukács
- (Croatia) Oleksandra Oliynykova

The following players received entry from the qualifying draw:

- (Italy) Federica Arcidiacono
- (Italy) Nuria Brancaccio
- (Italy) Rubina Marta De Ponti
- (Argentina) Melany Krywoj
- (Slovenia) Manca Pislak
- (Slovenia) Nika Radišič

== Champions ==
=== Men's singles ===
- (Australia) Christopher O'Connell def. (Germany) Jeremy Jahn 7–5, 6–2.

=== Women's singles ===
- (Netherlands) Arantxa Rus def. (Slovenia) Nika Radišič, 4–6, 6–4, 6–1

=== Men's doubles ===
- (Bosnia and Herzegovina) Tomislav Brkić / (Croatia) Ante Pavić def. (Serbia) Nikola Čačić / (Croatia) Antonio Šančić 6–2, 6–3.

=== Women's doubles ===
- (Slovenia) Veronika Erjavec / (Slovenia) Nika Radišič def. (Italy) Martina Caregaro / (Switzerland) Lisa Sabino, 6–3, 7–5
