= 2010 Zucchetti Kos Tennis Cup – Singles =

Singles
- 2010 Zucchetti Kos Tennis Cup

Final
- Champion: (Belgium) Steve Darcis
- Runner-up: (Spain) Daniel Muñoz-de la Nava
- Score: 6–2, 6–4

Events
Singles	Doubles
← 2009 ·	Zucchetti Kos Tennis Cup	· 2011 →

Peter Luczak was the defending champion, however he chose to not participate this year.
Steve Darcis won in the final 6–2, 6–4, against Daniel Muñoz-de la Nava.

== Seeds ==
1. (Argentina) Carlos Berlocq (first round)
2. (Portugal) Rui Machado (first round)
3. (Austria) Daniel Köllerer (first round, disqualified)
4. (Austria) Martin Fischer (second round)
5. (France) Édouard Roger-Vasselin (quarterfinals)
6. (Romania) Adrian Ungur (first round)
7. (Spain) Albert Ramos-Viñolas (second round)
8. (Belgium) Steve Darcis (champion)

== Draw ==
=== Key ===
- Q = Qualifier
- WC = Wild card
- LL = Lucky loser
- Alt = Alternate
- SE = Special exempt
- PR = Protected ranking
- ITF = ITF entry
- JE = Junior exempt
- w/o = Walkover
- r = Retired
- d = Defaulted
- SR = Special ranking

=== Finals ===
Semifinals
(Spain) Daniel Muñoz-de la Nava	1	6	6
(France) Vincent Millot	6	1	2
(Netherlands) Robin Haase	4	4
8	(Belgium) Steve Darcis	6	6

Final
(Spain) Daniel Muñoz-de la Nava	2	4
8	(Belgium) Steve Darcis	6	6

=== Top half ===
First round
1	(Argentina) C Berlocq	4	6	6^{6}
(Chile) J Aguilar	6	2	7
Q	(Slovakia) A Martin	6	6^{4}	4
(Czech Republic) L Rosol	4	7	6
(Italy) A di Mauro	5	3
(Argentina) D Junqueira	7	6
(Spain) D Muñoz-de la Nava	6	6
6/WC	(Romania) A Ungur	4	4
4	(Austria) M Fischer	6	2	6
(France) B Paire	3	6	2
Q	(Netherlands) T Schoorel	6	6
(Italy) S Galvani	2	4
(France) V Millot	5	6	6
(Spain) R Bautista-Agut	7	4	1
Q	(Italy) M Bosa	0	1
7	(Spain) A Ramos-Viñolas	6	6

Second round
(Chile) J Aguilar	4	5
(Czech Republic) L Rosol	6	7
(Argentina) D Junqueira	5	4
(Spain) D Muñoz-de la Nava	7	6
4	(Austria) M Fischer	4	3
Q	(Netherlands) T Schoorel	6	6
(France) V Millot	3	6	6
7	(Spain) A Ramos-Viñolas	6	4	1

Quarterfinals
(Czech Republic) L Rosol	1	6^{6}
(Spain) D Muñoz-de la Nava	6	7
Q	(Netherlands) T Schoorel	3	2
(France) V Millot	6	6

Semifinals
(Spain) D Muñoz-de la Nava	1	6	6
(France) V Millot	6	1	2

=== Bottom half ===
First round
5	(France) É Roger-Vasselin	6	6
(Czech Republic) J Pospíšil	3	0
(Austria) A Peya	6	6
(Spain) A Menéndez-Maceiras	2	0
(Germany) M Zverev	6	6
WC	(Germany) J Jahn	0	4
(Netherlands) R Haase	6	6^{3}
3/WC	(Austria) D Köllerer	1	7	d
8	(Belgium) S Darcis	7	6
(Spain) S Gutiérrez-Ferrol	6^{5}	1
WC	(Belgium) C Rochus	6^{4}	4
(Serbia) F Krajinović	7	6
(Czech Republic) D Lojda	3	5
(Argentina) JP Brzezicki	6	7
Q	(Italy) G Naso	4	7	6
2	(Portugal) R Machado	6	6^{2}	2

Second round
5	(France) É Roger-Vasselin	7	6
(Austria) A Peya	6^{3}	1
(Germany) M Zverev	1	2
(Netherlands) R Haase	6	6
8	(Belgium) S Darcis	6	6
(Serbia) F Krajinović	4	3
(Argentina) JP Brzezicki	6	6
Q	(Italy) G Naso	1	4

Quarterfinals
5	(France) É Roger-Vasselin	2	2
(Netherlands) R Haase	6	6
8	(Belgium) S Darcis	6	6
(Argentina) JP Brzezicki	1	4

Semifinals
(Netherlands) R Haase	4	4
8	(Belgium) S Darcis	6	6
