= 2011 Zucchetti Kos Tennis Cup – Doubles =

Doubles
- 2011 Zucchetti Kos Tennis Cup

Final
- Champions: (Austria) Julian Knowle (Germany) Michael Kohlmann
- Runners-up: (Australia) Colin Ebelthite (Australia) Adam Feeney
- Score: 2–6, 7–5, [10–5]

Events
Singles	Doubles
← 2010 ·	Zucchetti Kos Tennis Cup	· 2012 →

Robin Haase and Rogier Wassen were the defending champions, but Haase decided not to participate.
Wassen played alongside Jesse Huta Galung. They were eliminated already in the first round.

Julian Knowle and Michael Kohlmann won the title, defeating Colin Ebelthite and Adam Feeney 2–6, 7–5, [10–5] in the final.

== Seeds ==
1. (Austria) Julian Knowle / (Germany) Michael Kohlmann (champions)
2. (Germany) Dustin Brown / (Croatia) Lovro Zovko (first round)
3. (Sweden) Johan Brunström / (Sweden) Andreas Siljeström (semifinals)
4. (Germany) Frank Moser / (United Kingdom) Ken Skupski (quarterfinals)

== Draw ==
=== Key ===
- Q = Qualifier
- WC = Wild card
- LL = Lucky loser
- Alt = Alternate
- SE = Special exempt
- PR = Protected ranking
- ITF = ITF entry
- JE = Junior exempt
- w/o = Walkover
- r = Retired
- d = Defaulted
- SR = Special ranking

=== Draw ===
First round
1	(Austria) J Knowle (Germany) M Kohlmann	6	6
(France) O Charroin (India) P Raja	3	4
(Netherlands) J Huta Galung (Netherlands) R Wassen	4	2
(Czech Republic) I Minář (Czech Republic) D Škoch	6	6
4	(Germany) F Moser (United Kingdom) K Skupski	6	6
WC	(Czech Republic) J Hájek (Austria) T Muster	1	4
WC	(Italy) M Navarra (Romania) A Ungur	6	6
(Belarus) U Ignatik (Slovakia) M Kližan	2	4
WC	(Italy) Simone Appio (Italy) Mauro Commisso	4	5
(Spain) R Ramírez Hidalgo (Kazakhstan) Y Schukin	6	7
(United Kingdom) J Delgado (United Kingdom) J Marray	2	6^{6}
3	(Sweden) J Brunström (Sweden) A Siljeström	6	7^{8}
(Australia) C Ebelthite (Australia) A Feeney	6	6
(Italy) A di Mauro (Italy) A Motti	3	2
(Czech Republic) J Pospíšil (Slovakia) I Zelenay	6	7^{8}
2	(Germany) D Brown (Croatia) L Zovko	2	6^{6}

Quarterfinals
1	(Austria) J Knowle (Germany) M Kohlmann	w/o
(Czech Republic) I Minář (Czech Republic) D Škoch
4	(Germany) F Moser (United Kingdom) K Skupski	4	7^{7}	[7]
WC	(Italy) M Navarra (Romania) A Ungur	6	6^{5}	[10]
(Spain) R Ramírez Hidalgo (Kazakhstan) Y Schukin	4	3
3	(Sweden) J Brunström (Sweden) A Siljeström	6	6
(Australia) C Ebelthite (Australia) A Feeney	6	4	[10]
(Czech Republic) J Pospíšil (Slovakia) I Zelenay	3	6	[6]

Semifinals
1	(Austria) J Knowle (Germany) M Kohlmann	6	5	[14]
WC	(Italy) M Navarra (Romania) A Ungur	3	7	[12]
3	(Sweden) J Brunström (Sweden) A Siljeström	5	2
(Australia) C Ebelthite (Australia) A Feeney	7	6

Final
1	(Austria) J Knowle (Germany) M Kohlmann	2	7	[10]
(Australia) C Ebelthite (Australia) A Feeney	6	5	[5]
