= 2021 Internazionali di Tennis del Friuli Venezia Giulia – Doubles =

Doubles
- 2021 Internazionali di Tennis del Friuli Venezia Giulia

Final
- Champions: (Brazil) Orlando Luz (Brazil) Rafael Matos
- Runners-up: (Peru) Sergio Galdós (Argentina) Renzo Olivo
- Score: 6–4, 7–6^{(7–5)}

Events
Singles	Doubles
← 2020 ·	Internazionali di Tennis del Friuli Venezia Giulia	· 2022 →

Ariel Behar and Andrey Golubev were the defending champions but chose not to defend their title.

Orlando Luz and Rafael Matos won the title after defeating Sergio Galdós and Renzo Olivo 6–4, 7–6^{(7–5)} in the final.

== Seeds ==
1. (Brazil) Orlando Luz / (Brazil) Rafael Matos (champions)
2. (Czech Republic) Zdeněk Kolář / (Venezuela) Luis David Martínez (semifinals)
3. (United States) Robert Galloway / (United States) Alex Lawson (first round)
4. (United States) Evan King / (United States) Max Schnur (semifinals)

== Draw ==
=== Key ===
- Q = Qualifier
- WC = Wild card
- LL = Lucky loser
- Alt = Alternate
- SE = Special exempt
- PR = Protected ranking
- ITF = ITF entry
- JE = Junior exempt
- w/o = Walkover
- r = Retired
- d = Defaulted
- SR = Special ranking

First round
1	(Brazil) O Luz (Brazil) R Matos	7^{7}	7^{8}
PR	(Italy) A Motti (Italy) J Ocleppo	6^{3}	6^{6}
(Argentina) F Cerúndolo (Argentina) JM Cerúndolo	6	6
WC	(Italy) Luca Serena (Italy) Daniele Valentino	3	1
4	(United States) E King (United States) M Schnur	2	6	[10]
(Italy) F Baldi (Italy) A Pellegrino	6	2	[8]
(Uruguay) M Cuevas (Bolivia) H Dellien	5	5
WC	(Italy) F Forti (Italy) G Zeppieri	7	7
WC	(Italy) Gregorio De Gasper (Italy) Angelo Rossi	2	0
(Peru) S Galdós (Argentina) R Olivo	6	6
(United States) JC Aragone (Colombia) N Barrientos	6	6
3	(United States) R Galloway (United States) A Lawson	4	4
(Brazil) J Menezes (Argentina) TA Tirante
Alt	(Peru) A Merino (Argentina) C Ugo Carabelli	w/o
(France) Q Halys (France) G Simon	6	1	[7]
2	(Czech Republic) Z Kolář (Venezuela) LD Martínez	4	6	[10]

Quarterfinals
1	(Brazil) O Luz (Brazil) R Matos	6	6
(Argentina) F Cerúndolo (Argentina) JM Cerúndolo	1	1
4	(United States) E King (United States) M Schnur	6	6^{4}	[10]
WC	(Italy) F Forti (Italy) G Zeppieri	2	7^{7}	[8]
(Peru) S Galdós (Argentina) R Olivo	7^{7}	6
(United States) JC Aragone (Colombia) N Barrientos	6^{5}	3
Alt	(Peru) A Merino (Argentina) C Ugo Carabelli	0	3
2	(Czech Republic) Z Kolář (Venezuela) LD Martínez	6	6

Semifinals
1	(Brazil) O Luz (Brazil) R Matos	6	7^{7}
4	(United States) E King (United States) M Schnur	4	6^{4}
(Peru) S Galdós (Argentina) R Olivo	6	5	[12]
2	(Czech Republic) Z Kolář (Venezuela) LD Martínez	4	7	[10]

Final
1	(Brazil) O Luz (Brazil) R Matos	6	7^{7}
(Peru) S Galdós (Argentina) R Olivo	4	6^{5}
