= 2017 Internazionali di Tennis del Friuli Venezia Giulia =

- Date: 14–20 August
- Edition: 14th
- Category: Challenger Tour
- Surface: Clay / outdoor
- Location: Cordenons, Italy

Champions

Singles
- (Sweden) Elias Ymer

Doubles
- (Czech Republic) Roman Jebavý / (Czech Republic) Zdeněk Kolář
← 2016 ·	Internazionali di Tennis del Friuli Venezia Giulia	· 2018 →

The 2017 Internazionali di Tennis del Friuli Venezia Giulia was a professional tennis tournament played on clay courts. It was the fourteenth edition of the tournament which was part of the 2017 ATP Challenger Tour. It took place in Cordenons, Italy between 14 and 20 August 2017.

== Singles main-draw entrants ==
=== Seeds ===
Country	Player	Rank^{1}	Seed
SRB	Laslo Đere	104	1
ESP	Guillermo García López	130	2
CZE	Adam Pavlásek	135	3
ESP	Roberto Carballés Baena	137	4
HUN	Attila Balázs	164	5
ITA	Lorenzo Giustino	199	6
ESP	Jaume Munar	200	7
ITA	Andrea Arnaboldi	239	8

- ^{1} Rankings are as of 7 August 2017.

=== Other entrants ===
The following players received wildcards into the singles main draw:

- (Romania) Dragoș Dima
- (Italy) Gianluca Mager
- (Italy) Andrea Pellegrino
- (Italy) Lorenzo Sonego

The following player received entry into the singles main draw using a protected ranking:

- (Spain) Daniel Muñoz de la Nava

The following player received entry into the singles main draw as an alternate:

- (Sweden) Mikael Ymer

The following players received entry from the qualifying draw:

- (Uruguay) Martín Cuevas
- (Italy) Gianluca Di Nicola
- (Sweden) Christian Lindell
- (Italy) Adelchi Virgili

== Champions ==
=== Singles ===
- (Sweden) Elias Ymer def. (Spain) Roberto Carballés Baena 6–2, 6–3.

=== Doubles ===
- (Czech Republic) Roman Jebavý / (Czech Republic) Zdeněk Kolář def. (Netherlands) Matwé Middelkoop / (Slovakia) Igor Zelenay 6–2, 6–3.
