= 2017 Internazionali di Tennis del Friuli Venezia Giulia – Singles =

Singles
- 2017 Internazionali di Tennis del Friuli Venezia Giulia

Final
- Champion: (Sweden) Elias Ymer
- Runner-up: (Spain) Roberto Carballés Baena
- Score: 6–2, 6–3

Events
Singles	Doubles
- Internazionali di Tennis del Friuli Venezia Giulia

Taro Daniel was the defending champion but chose not to defend his title.

Elias Ymer won the title after defeating Roberto Carballés Baena 6–2, 6–3 in the final.

== Seeds ==
1. (Serbia) Laslo Đere (semifinals, retired)
2. (Spain) Guillermo García López (first round)
3. (Czech Republic) Adam Pavlásek (second round)
4. (Spain) Roberto Carballés Baena (final)
5. (Hungary) Attila Balázs (first round)
6. (Italy) Lorenzo Giustino (semifinals)
7. (Spain) Jaume Munar (second round)
8. (Italy) Andrea Arnaboldi (second round)

== Draw ==
Key

- Q = Qualifier
- WC = Wild card
- LL = Lucky loser
- Alt = Alternate
- ITF = ITF entry
- PR = Protected ranking
- SR = Special ranking
- SE = Special exempt
- JE = Junior exempt
- JR = Junior Accelerator Programme entrant
- CO = College Accelerator Programme entrant
- NG = Next Gen Accelerator Program entrant
- w/o = Walkover
- r = Retired
- d = Defaulted

=== Finals ===
Semifinals
1	(Serbia) Laslo Đere	1^{r}
4	(Spain) Roberto Carballés Baena	5
(Sweden) Elias Ymer	6	6
6	(Italy) Lorenzo Giustino	2	1

Final
4	(Spain) Roberto Carballés Baena	2	3
(Sweden) Elias Ymer	6	6

=== Top half ===
First round
1	(Serbia) L Đere	6	4	6
Q	(Uruguay) M Cuevas	4	6	4
(Czech Republic) Z Kolář	3	6	1
(Italy) F Gaio	6	1	6
(Italy) M Viola	1	4
(Spain) E López-Pérez	6	6
WC	(Italy) L Sonego	6	3	6
5	(Hungary) A Balázs	2	6	3
4	(Spain) R Carballés Baena	6	6
Alt	(Sweden) M Ymer	4	1
(Poland) K Majchrzak	6	6
(Argentina) P Cachin	3	4
(Russia) I Gakhov	6^{4}	1
(Portugal) G Oliveira	7^{7}	6
(Czech Republic) Marek Jaloviec	3	2
7	(Spain) J Munar	6	6

Second round
1	(Serbia) L Đere	7	6
(Italy) F Gaio	5	2
(Spain) E López-Pérez	6	6
WC	(Italy) L Sonego	3	4
4	(Spain) R Carballés Baena	6	6
(Poland) K Majchrzak	2	1
(Portugal) G Oliveira	6	6
7	(Spain) J Munar	4	2

Quarterfinals
1	(Serbia) L Đere	6	6^{1}	6
(Spain) E López-Pérez	4	7^{7}	4
4	(Spain) R Carballés Baena	6	6
(Portugal) G Oliveira	3	1

Semifinals
1	(Serbia) L Đere	1^{r}
4	(Spain) R Carballés Baena	5

=== Bottom half ===
First round
8	(Italy) A Arnaboldi	6	6
Q	(Sweden) C Lindell	1	4
Q	(Italy) A Virgili	2	7^{7}	0
(Spain) P Martínez	6	6^{4}	6
(Sweden) E Ymer	6	6
Q	(Italy) Gianluca Di Nicola	2	3
WC	(Italy) G Mager	5	3
3	(Czech Republic) A Pavlásek	7	6
6	(Italy) L Giustino	4	6	6
(Italy) G Quinzi	6	2	1
PR	(Spain) D Muñoz de la Nava	6	6
(Italy) M Donati	3	2
WC	(Romania) D Dima	3	4
WC	(Italy) A Pellegrino	6	6
(Serbia) D Petrović	7^{7}	6
2	(Spain) G García López	6^{3}	2

Second round
8	(Italy) A Arnaboldi	6^{2}	1
(Spain) P Martínez	7^{7}	6
(Sweden) E Ymer	6	6
3	(Czech Republic) A Pavlásek	4	1
6	(Italy) L Giustino	3	6	6
PR	(Spain) D Muñoz de la Nava	6	2	3
WC	(Italy) A Pellegrino	5	6	6
(Serbia) D Petrović	7	4	3

Quarterfinals
(Spain) P Martínez	6^{2}	3
(Sweden) E Ymer	7^{7}	6
6	(Italy) L Giustino	6	6
WC	(Italy) A Pellegrino	3	3

Semifinals
(Sweden) E Ymer	6	6
6	(Italy) L Giustino	2	1
