= 2017 Internazionali di Tennis del Friuli Venezia Giulia – Doubles =

Doubles
- 2017 Internazionali di Tennis del Friuli Venezia Giulia

Final
- Champions: (Czech Republic) Roman Jebavý (Czech Republic) Zdeněk Kolář
- Runners-up: (Netherlands) Matwé Middelkoop (Slovakia) Igor Zelenay
- Score: 6–2, 6–3

Events
Singles	Doubles
- Internazionali di Tennis del Friuli Venezia Giulia

Andre Begemann and Aliaksandr Bury were the defending champions but chose not to defend their title.

Roman Jebavý ang Zdeněk Kolář won the title after defeating Matwé Middelkoop and Igor Zelenay 6–2, 6–3 in the final.

== Seeds ==
1. (Netherlands) Matwé Middelkoop / (Slovakia) Igor Zelenay (final)
2. (Czech Republic) Roman Jebavý / (Czech Republic) Zdeněk Kolář (champions)
3. (Monaco) Romain Arneodo / (France) Hugo Nys (first round)
4. (Croatia) Marin Draganja / (Croatia) Tomislav Draganja (semifinals)

== Draw ==
Key

- Q = Qualifier
- WC = Wild card
- LL = Lucky loser
- Alt = Alternate
- ITF = ITF entry
- PR = Protected ranking
- SR = Special ranking
- SE = Special exempt
- JE = Junior exempt
- JR = Junior Accelerator Programme entrant
- CO = College Accelerator Programme entrant
- NG = Next Gen Accelerator Program entrant
- w/o = Walkover
- r = Retired
- d = Defaulted

First round
1	(Netherlands) M Middelkoop (Slovakia) I Zelenay	6	6
PR	(Serbia) I Bozoljac (Italy) F Cipolla	4	2
(Uruguay) A Behar (Spain) E López-Pérez	5	6	[12]
(Serbia) D Petrović (Serbia) Ilija Vučić	7	4	[10]
3	(Monaco) R Arneodo (France) H Nys	6^{6}	4
(Romania) P Grigoriu (Austria) D Pichler	7^{8}	6
WC	(Italy) G Mager (Italy) A Pellegrino	6^{2}	6	[8]
(Poland) T Bednarek (Portugal) G Oliveira	7^{7}	4	[10]
(Austria) M Neuchrist (Austria) T-S Weissborn	6	6
WC	(Romania) M-I Miron (Italy) Luca Serena	4	4
(Argentina) P Cachin (Poland) K Majchrzak	4	4
4	(Croatia) M Draganja (Croatia) T Draganja	6	6
WC	(Italy) M Donati (Italy) L Sonego	6	7^{7}
(Italy) R Ghedin (Italy) A Motti	4	6^{4}
(Spain) P Martínez (Spain) J Munar	1	2
2	(Czech Republic) R Jebavý (Czech Republic) Z Kolář	6	6

Quarterfinals
1	(Netherlands) M Middelkoop (Slovakia) I Zelenay	6	3	[10]
(Uruguay) A Behar (Spain) E López-Pérez	3	6	[6]
(Romania) P Grigoriu (Austria) D Pichler	3	4
(Poland) T Bednarek (Portugal) G Oliveira	6	6
(Austria) M Neuchrist (Austria) T-S Weissborn	6^{5}	1
4	(Croatia) M Draganja (Croatia) T Draganja	7^{7}	6
WC	(Italy) M Donati (Italy) L Sonego	3	4
2	(Czech Republic) R Jebavý (Czech Republic) Z Kolář	6	6

Semifinals
1	(Netherlands) M Middelkoop (Slovakia) I Zelenay	6	6
(Poland) T Bednarek (Portugal) G Oliveira	4	1
4	(Croatia) M Draganja (Croatia) T Draganja	3	7	[8]
2	(Czech Republic) R Jebavý (Czech Republic) Z Kolář	6	5	[10]

Final
1	(Netherlands) M Middelkoop (Slovakia) I Zelenay	2	3
2	(Czech Republic) R Jebavý (Czech Republic) Z Kolář	6	6
