= Charles Barry (tennis) =

Irish tennis player (born 2001)

- Country (sports): Ireland
- Born: 9 May 2001 (age 25) Limerick, Ireland
- Height: 1.85 m (6 ft 1 in)
- Plays: Left-handed (two-handed backhand)
- College: Tulane; Memphis
- Coach: David O'Hare
- Prize money: US $19,718

Singles
- Career record: 0–0 (at ATP Tour level, Grand Slam level, and in Davis Cup)
- Career titles: 0

Doubles
- Career record: 0–1 (at ATP Tour level, Grand Slam level, and in Davis Cup)
- Career titles: 1 Challenger, 6 ITF
- Highest ranking: No. 210 (31 August 2026)
- Current ranking: No. 210 (31 August 2026)
- Last updated on: 31 August 2026.

Charles Barry (born 9 May 2001) is an Irish tennis player. Barry has a career high ATP doubles ranking of No. 210 achieved on 31 August 2026.

Barry represents Ireland at the Davis Cup, where he has a win/loss record of 1–2.

Barry played college tennis at Tulane before transferring to Memphis.

Teaming up with Anthony Genov, he reached his first ATP Challenger doubles final at the 2026 Internazionali di Tennis del Friuli Venezia Giulia, losing to Alexandru Jecan and David Poljak in a deciding champions tiebreak.

== ATP Challenger and ITF World Tennis Tour finals ==
=== Doubles: 12 (6–6) ===
Legend (singles) ATP Challenger Tour (0–1) ITF World Tennis Tour (6–5)	Finals by surface Hard (3–3) Clay (3–3) Grass (0–0)

Result	W–L	Date	Tournament	Tier	Surface	Partner	Opponents	Score
Loss	0–1	Feb 2025	M15 Huamantla, Mexico	WTT	Hard	(United Kingdom) Aidan McHugh	(United States) Pranav Kumar (United States) Noah Schachter	3–6, 6–7(2–7)
Win	1–1	Feb 2025	M15 Huamantla, Mexico	WTT	Hard	(United Kingdom) Aidan McHugh	(Mexico) Rafael Alonso de Alba Valdés (Mexico) Alejandro Hayen	7–6(8–6), 6–2
Loss	1–2	Mar 2025	M15 Huamantla, Mexico	WTT	Hard	(Spain) Iván Marrero Curbelo	(Mexico) Daniel Moreno (Mexico) Alan Fernando Rubio Fierros	6–7(5–7), 6–7(2–7)
Win	2–2	May 2025	M25 Pensacola, US	WTT	Clay	(Australia) Joshua Charlton	(United States) Garrett Johns (United States) William Woodall	7–6(7–3), 6–7(4–7), [10–8]
Loss	2–3	Jun 2025	M25 Monastir, Tunisia	WTT	Hard	(New Zealand) Ajeet Rai	Sergey Betov; Daniil Ostapenkov	5–7, 4–6
Win	3–3	Aug 2025	M25 Muttenz, Switzerland	WTT	Clay	(Germany) Lucas Gerch	(Switzerland) Adrien Burdet (Switzerland) Jeffrey von der Schulenburg	6–0, 6–4
Win	4–3	Sep 2025	M25 Lausanne, Switzerland	WTT	Clay	(France) Max Westphal	(Chinese Taipei) Jeffrey Hsu (Greece) Dimitris Sakellaridis	6–3, 7–6(7–5)
Loss	4–4	Nov 2025	M25 Valencia, Spain	WTT	Clay	(Spain) Ignasi Forcano	(Spain) Mario Mansilla Díez (Spain) Benjamín Winter López	3–6, 2–6
Loss	4–5	Nov 2025	M25 Antalya, Turkey	WTT	Clay	(Ukraine) Oleksandr Ovcharenko	(Serbia) Marko Maksimović (Serbia) Stefan Popović	6–2, 5–7, [7–10]
Win	5–5	Jan 2026	M25 Hazebrouck, France	WTT	Hard (i)	(Germany) Niklas Schell	(France) Maxence Bertimon; Mikalai Haliak	3–6, 7–6(7–5), [10–2]
Win	6–5	Mar 2026	M25 Ma'anshan, China	WTT	Hard (i)	(United Kingdom) Charles Broom	(Japan) Tomohiro Masabayashi (Japan) Yamato Sueoka	6–4, 6–4
Loss	6–6	Jul 2026	Cordenons, Italy	Challenger	Clay	(Bulgaria) Anthony Genov	(Romania) Alexandru Jecan (Czech Republic) David Poljak	6–4, 6–7(4–7), [3–10]
