= Alexandru Jecan =

Romanian tennis player (born 1988)

- Full name: Mircea-Alexandru Jecan
- Country (sports): Romania
- Born: 2 June 1988 (age 38) Cluj-Napoca, Romania
- Height: 1.80 m (5 ft 11 in)
- Plays: Left-handed (two-handed backhand)
- Prize money: US $190,417

Singles
- Career record: 0–0
- Career titles: 3 ITF
- Highest ranking: No. 450 (10 February 2020)

Doubles
- Career record: 0–4
- Career titles: 3 ATP Challenger, 28 ITF
- Highest ranking: No. 122 (15 June 2026)
- Current ranking: No. 125 (10 August 2026)
- Last updated on: 10 August 2026.

Mircea-Alexandru Jecan (born 2 June 1988) is a Romanian tennis player. He has a career high ATP doubles ranking of world No. 122 achieved on 15 June 2026 and a singles ranking of No. 450 achieved on 10 February 2020.

== Career ==
Jecan won his maiden ATP Challenger doubles title at the 2023 Braga Open with Marco Bortolotti. Teaming up with fellow Romanian Bogdan Pavel he won the 2026 Cattolica Challenger, and playing with David Poljak he claimed the title at the 2026 Internazionali di Tennis del Friuli Venezia Giulia.

== ATP Challenger Tour finals ==
=== Doubles: 12 (3 titles, 9 runner-ups) ===
Legend ATP Challenger Tour (3–9)	Titles by surface Hard (0–2) Clay (3–7)

Result	W–L	Date	Tournament	Tier	Surface	Partner	Opponents	Score
Win	1–0	Sep 2023	Braga, Portugal	Challenger	Clay	(Italy) Marco Bortolotti	(Italy) Stefano Travaglia (Italy) Alexander Weis	7–5, 7–5
Loss	1–1	Oct 2023	Hamburg, Germany	Challenger	Hard (i)	(Netherlands) Mick Veldheer	(Austria) Dennis Novak (Australia) Akira Santillan	4–6, 6–3, [3–10]
Loss	1–2	Jun 2024	Zagreb, Croatia	Challenger	Clay	(Portugal) Henrique Rocha	(France) Jonathan Eysseric (France) Quentin Halys	4–6, 4–6
Loss	1–3	Aug 2024	Como, Italy	Challenger	Clay	Ivan Liutarevich	(Romania) Victor Vlad Cornea (Ukraine) Denys Molchanov	2–6, 3–6
Loss	1–4	Jun 2025	Poznań, Poland	Challenger	Clay	(Romania) Bogdan Pavel	(Spain) Sergio Martos Gornés (India) Vijay Sundar Prashanth	6–2, 5–7, [8–10]
Loss	1–5	Jun 2025	Brașov, România	Challenger	Clay	(Romania) Bogdan Pavel	(Ukraine) Vladyslav Orlov (Argentina) Santiago Rodríguez Taverna	6–4, 6–7^{(5–7)}, [7–10]
Loss	1–6	Aug 2025	Sofia, Bulgaria	Challenger	Clay	(Romania) Bogdan Pavel	(Austria) David Pichler (Croatia) Nino Serdarušić	6–4, 6–7^{(2–7)}, [7–10]
Loss	1–7	Sep 2025	Lisbon, Portugal	Challenger	Clay	(Romania) Bogdan Pavel	(Spain) Pablo Llamas Ruiz (Spain) Sergio Martos Gornés	6–7^{(5–7)}, 4–6
Loss	1–8	Nov 2025	Helsinki, Finland	Challenger	Hard (i)	(Romania) Bogdan Pavel	(Germany) Jakob Schnaitter (Germany) Mark Wallner	2–6, 6–4, [6–10]
Loss	1–9	Jan 2026	Buenos Aires, Argentina	Challenger	Clay	(Romania) Bogdan Pavel	(Argentina) Mariano Kestelboim (Brazil) Marcelo Zormann	2–6, 4–6
Win	2–9	Jun 2026	Cattolica, Italy	Challenger	Clay	(Romania) Bogdan Pavel	(Sweden) Erik Grevelius (Sweden) Adam Heinonen	7–6^{(12–10)}, 6–4
Win	3–9	Jul 2026	Cordenons, Italy	Challenger	Clay	(Czech Republic) David Poljak	(Republic of Ireland) Charles Barry (Bulgaria) Anthony Genov	4–6, 7–6^{(7–4)}, [10–3]
