= David Poljak =

Czech tennis player (born 1996)

- Country (sports): Czech Republic
- Born: 17 May 1996 (age 30) Ostrava, Czech Republic
- Height: 1.88 m (6 ft 2 in)
- Plays: Right-handed (two-handed backhand)
- Coach: Jiří Novák
- Prize money: US $195,833

Singles
- Career record: 0–0 (at ATP Tour level, Grand Slam level, and in Davis Cup)
- Career titles: 6 ITF
- Highest ranking: No. 370 (21 March 2022)
- Current ranking: No. 1,208 (14 September 2026)

Doubles
- Career record: 0–0 (at ATP Tour level, Grand Slam level, and in Davis Cup)
- Career titles: 2 ATP Challenger, 19 ITF
- Highest ranking: No. 124 (14 September 2026)
- Current ranking: No. 124 (14 September 2026)
- Last updated on: 14 September 2026.

David Poljak (born 17 May 1996) is a Czech tennis player. Poljak has a career high ATP singles ranking of No. 370 achieved on 21 March 2022 and a career high ATP doubles ranking of No. 124 achieved on 14 September 2026.

Poljak has singles wins over Denis Istomin, Fabian Marozsan, Thomaz Bellucci, Andrey Golubev, Roman Safiullin, Flavio Cobolli and Illya Marchenko and a win in doubles against Andrea Vavassori and Sem Verbeek.

Poljak has won two ATP Challenger doubles titles at the 2026 Tenerife Challenger II with Filip Duda and at the 2026 Internazionali di Tennis del Friuli Venezia Giulia with Alexandru Jecan.

== ATP Challenger Tour finals ==
Result	W–L	Date	Tournament	Category	Surface	Partner	Opponents	Score
Loss	0–1	Jul 2022	Nur-Sultan, Kazakhstan	Challenger	Hard	(Czech Republic) Andrew Paulson	(South Korea) Nam Ji-sung (South Korea) Song Min-kyu	2–6, 6–3, [6–10]
Loss	0–2	Jun 2025	Troyes, France	Challenger	Clay	(Germany) Tim Rühl	(Spain) Mario Mansilla Díez (Spain) Bruno Pujol Navarro	6^{3}–7, 6^{2}–7
Loss	0–3	Oct 2025	Hersonissos, Greece	Challenger	Hard	(France) Max Westphal	(Spain) Alberto Barroso Campos (Spain) Iñaki Montes de la Torre	5–7, 6^{3}–7
Loss	0–4	Nov 2025	Bergamo, Italy	Challenger	Hard (i)	(Germany) Tim Rühl	(United Kingdom) Joshua Paris (United Kingdom) Marcus Willis	6^{3}–7, 4–6
Win	1–4	Feb 2026	Tenerife, Spain	Challenger	Hard	(Czech Republic) Filip Duda	(Croatia) Luka Mikrut (Portugal) Tiago Pereira	7–6^{0}, 6–3
Loss	1–5	May 2026	Košice, Slovakia	Challenger	Clay	(Slovakia) Lukáš Pokorný	(Slovakia) Miloš Karol (Croatia) Nino Serdarušić	7–5, 6–7^{(4–7)}, [5–10]
Win	2–5	Jul 2026	Cordenons, Italy	Challenger	Clay	(Romania) Alexandru Jecan	(Republic of Ireland) Charles Barry (Bulgaria) Anthony Genov	4–6, 7–6^{(7–4)}, [10–3]
Loss	2–6	Jul 2026	Zug, Switzerland	Challenger	Clay	(Czech Republic) Andrew Paulson	(Netherlands) Thijmen Loof (Japan) Kaito Uesugi	4–6, 2–6
Loss	2–7	Jul 2026	Liberec, Czech Republic	Challenger	Clay	(Austria) Maximilian Neuchrist	(Spain) Iñigo Cervantes (Ukraine) Denys Molchanov	6–7^{(7–9)}, 3–6
Win	3–7	Aug 2026	Sion, Switzerland	Challenger	Clay	(Austria) Maximilian Neuchrist	(Bolivia) Murkel Dellien (Argentina) Facundo Mena	6–4, 6–4
