= Federico Bondioli =

Italian tennis player (born 2005)

- Country (sports): Italy
- Born: 16 May 2005 (age 21) Ravenna, Italy
- Height: 1.85 m (6 ft 1 in)
- Turned pro: 2022
- Plays: Left-handed (two handed backhand)
- Coach: Federico Buffagni
- Prize money: US $183,471

Singles
- Career record: 0–0
- Highest ranking: No. 290 (20 July 2026)
- Current ranking: No. 324 (28 September 2026)

Doubles
- Career record: 1–1
- Highest ranking: No. 189 (19 January 2026)
- Current ranking: No. 288 (20 July 2026)
- Last updated on: 28 September 2026.

Federico Bondioli (born 16 May 2005) is an Italian professional tennis player. He has a career-high ATP singles ranking of world No. 290 achieved on 20 July 2026 and a doubles ranking of No. 189 achieved on 19 January 2026.

== Career ==
=== Juniors ===
From Ravenna, he trained as a member of Sporting Club Sassuolo. He made his junior Grand Slam qualifying debut at the 2022 Wimbledon Championships, before making his debut at the 2023 Australian Open. Bondioli went on to reach the semifinals of the junior doubles at the boys' doubles in Melbourne with partner Matic Križnik. He also reached the final of the junior US Open boys' doubles in 2023, alongside Joel Schwärzler, where they lost to Max Dahlin and Oliver Ojakäär despite twice having a match point.

=== 2022-2024: Professional debut ===
In June 2022, Bondioli won his first ATP point in Frascati.

In September 2023, he also reached the semifinals at the ITF $25,000 event in Santa Margherita di Pula, but until December of that year had mainly concentrated on playing junior level tennis. In July 2024, he won his first singles professional ITF tournament in Serbia defeating Swiss player Carl Emil Overbeck in the final, in three sets.

=== 2025: ATP debut in doubles ===
In May, after winning the pre-qualifying tournament, he and Carlo Alberto Caniato received a wildcard into the doubles main draw of the Italian Open. In the first round, they upset the fifth-seeded team of Simone Bolelli and Andrea Vavassori.

== Performance timelines ==
Key
W	F	SF	QF	#R	RR	Q#	DNQ	A	NH

(W) winner; (F) finalist; (SF) semifinalist; (QF) quarterfinalist; (#R) rounds 4, 3, 2, 1; (RR) round-robin stage; (Q#) qualification round; (DNQ) did not qualify; (A) absent; (NH) not held; (SR) strike rate (events won / competed); (W–L) win–loss record.
To avoid confusion and double counting, these charts are updated at the conclusion of a tournament or when the player's participation has ended.

=== Doubles ===
Current through the 2025 Italian Open.

Tournament	2025	SR	W–L	Win%
ATP Masters 1000
Italian Open	2R	0 / 1	1–1	50%
Win–loss	1–1	0 / 1	1–1	50%

== ATP Challenger Tour finals ==
=== Singles: 1 runner-up ===
Result	W–L	Date	Tournament	Tier	Surface	Opponents	Score
Loss	0–1	Jul 2026	2026 Serena Wines 1881 Cup, Cordenons, Italy	ATP Challenger	Clay	(Spain) Max Alcala Gurri	2–6, 0–6

=== Doubles: 1 title, 1 runner-up ===
Result	W–L	Date	Tournament	Tier	Surface	Partner	Opponents	Score
Win	1–0	May 2025	Vicenza, Italy	Challenger	Hard	(Italy) Stefano Travaglia	(Denmark) August Holmgren (Denmark) Johannes Ingildsen	6–2, 6–1
Loss	1–1	Nov 2025	Alicante, Spain	Challenger	Hard	(Italy) Gianluca Cadenasso	(Sweden) Erik Grevelius (Sweden) Adam Heinonen	3–6, 3–6

== ITF World Tennis Tour finals ==
=== Doubles: 6 (2 titles, 4 runner-ups) ===
Result	W–L	Date	Tournament	Tier	Surface	Partner	Opponents	Score
Loss	0–1	Jan 2024	M15 Sharm El Sheikh, Egypt	WTT	Hard	(Italy) Carlo Alberto Caniato	Erik Arutiunian; Pavel Verbin	6–3, 5–7, [5–10]
Loss	0–2	May 2024	M15 Cervia, Italy	WTT	Clay	(Japan) Rei Sakamoto	(Italy) Jacopo Bilardo (Italy) Gianluca Cadenasso	Walkover
Win	1–2	Feb 2025	M15 Sharm El Sheikh, Egypt	WTT	Hard	(Italy) Carlo Alberto Caniato	(Italy) Gregorio Biondolillo (Italy) Lorenzo Sciahbasi	7–5, 6–2
Win	2-2	Feb 2025	M15 Sharm El Sheikh, Egypt	WTT	Hard	(Italy) Carlo Alberto Caniato	Erik Arutiunian; Daniil Ostapenkov	4–6, 7–6^{(7–1)}, [10–4]
Loss	2-3	Mar 2025	M25 Vale de Lobo, Portugal	WTT	Hard	(Italy) Carlo Alberto Caniato	(Spain) Rafael Izquierdo Luque (Portugal) Francisco Rocha	6–7^{(4–7)}, 3–6,
Loss	2-4	May 2025	M25 Cervia, Italy	WTT	Clay	(Italy) Carlo Alberto Caniato	(Italy) Francesco Forti (Germany) Daniel Masur	7–6^{(7–2)}, 3–6, [7–10]

== Junior Grand Slam finals ==
=== Doubles: 1 (1 runner-up) ===
Result	Year	Tournament	Surface	Partner	Opponents	Score
Loss	2023	US Open	Hard	(Austria) Joel Schwärzler	(Sweden) Max Dahlin (Estonia) Oliver Ojakäär	6–3, 3–6, [9–11]
