= Enrico Dalla Valle =

Italian tennis player

- Country (sports): Italy
- Born: 21 March 1998 (age 28) Ravenna, Italy
- Height: 1.96 m (6 ft 5 in)
- Plays: Right-handed (two-handed backhand)
- Prize money: $229,488

Singles
- Career record: 0–0
- Career titles: 7 ITF
- Highest ranking: No. 242 (24 June 2024)
- Current ranking: No. 441 (8 June 2026)

Doubles
- Career record: 0–0
- Career titles: 8 ITF
- Highest ranking: No. 299 (24 June 2019)
- Last updated on: 2 June 2026.

Enrico Dalla Valle (born 21 March 1998) is an Italian tennis player. He has a career high ATP singles ranking of world No. 242 achieved on 24 June 2024. He also has a career high doubles ranking of No. 299 achieved on 24 June 2019.

== Career ==
Dalla Valle began playing tennis at the age of 6. He won his first four ITF singles titles in a two month period in the middle of the 2019 season. He struggled with injuries for the next few years before winning his fifth singles title in Aprilia in 2022.

== ITF Tour finals ==
=== Singles: 10 (7–3) ===
Legend ITF Futures Tour / World Tennis Tour (7–3)	Finals by Surface Hard (0–1) Clay (7–2)

Result	W–L	Date	Tournament	Tier	Surface	Opponent	Score
Loss	0–1	May 2018	Italy F10, Casale Monferrato	Futures	Clay	(Chile) Bastián Malla	6–4, 4–6, 4–6
Win	1–1	Jun 2019	M15 Alkmaar, Netherlands	World Tennis Tour	Clay	(Netherlands) Niels Lootsma	7–6^{(7–4)}, 6–4
Win	2–1	Jul 2019	M15 Tabarka, Tunisia	World Tennis Tour	Clay	(Argentina) Manuel Peña López	6–4, 6–4
Win	3–1	Jul 2019	M15 Tabarka, Tunisia	World Tennis Tour	Clay	(Argentina) Sebastián Báez	3–6, 6–4, 6–4
Win	4–1	Jul 2019	M25+H Pontedera, Italy	World Tennis Tour	Clay	(Italy) Giulio Zeppieri	7–6^{(7–4)}, 7–5
Win	5–1	Jul 2022	M15 Aprilia, Italy	World Tennis Tour	Clay	(Italy) Niccolò Catini	6–3, 6–3
Loss	5–2	Feb 2023	M25 Monastir, Tunisia	World Tennis Tour	Hard	(Switzerland) Jakub Paul	3–6, 5–7
Win	6–2	Jun 2023	M25 Cattolica, Italy	World Tennis Tour	Clay	(Italy) Samuel Vincent Ruggeri	6–4, 6–2
Win	7–2	Jul 2023	M15 Celje, Slovenia	World Tennis Tour	Clay	(Poland) Paweł Juszczak	6–0, 6–1
Loss	7–3	Oct 2023	M25 Santa Margherita di Pula, Italy	World Tennis Tour	Clay	(Belgium) Gilles-Arnaud Bailly	1–6, 2–6

=== Doubles: 12 (8–4) ===
Legend ITF Futures Tour / World Tennis Tour (8–4)	Finals by Surface Hard (3–2) Clay (5–2)

Result	W–L	Date	Tournament	Tier	Surface	Partner	Opponents	Score
Win	1–0	Oct 2015	Turkey F40, Antalya	Futures	Hard	(Italy) Julian Ocleppo	(Austria) Pascal Brunner (Austria) Lucas Miedler	6–3, 7–5
Loss	1–1	Oct 2015	Egypt F37, Sharm El Sheikh	Futures	Hard	(Italy) Julian Ocleppo	(United Kingdom) Luke Bambridge (United Kingdom) Richard Gabb	6–7^{(3–7)}, 4–6
Win	2–1	Jul 2016	Italy F20, Casinalbo	Futures	Clay	(Italy) Riccardo Balzerani	(Germany) Pirmin Hänle (France) Alexandre Müller	6–3, 6–3
Loss	2–2	Jul 2017	Italy F21, Casinalbo	Futures	Clay	(Italy) Andrea Pellegrino	(Argentina) Federico Coria (Brazil) Bruno Sant'Anna	3–6, 6–4, [8–10]
Loss	2–3	Jul 2017	Italy F22, Gubbio	Futures	Clay	(Italy) Riccardo Balzerani	(Italy) Gianluca Di Nicola (Italy) Giorgio Portaluri	2–6, 2–6
Win	3–3	Jun 2018	Italy F14, Bergamo	Futures	Clay	(Italy) Pietro Rondoni	(Italy) Lorenzo Frigerio (Italy) Jacopo Stefanini	6–0, 6–3
Win	4–3	Sep 2018	Italy F26, Trieste	Futures	Clay	(Brazil) Oscar José Gutierrez	(Serbia) Milan Radojković (Germany) Peter Torebko	3–6, 6–3, [10–4]
Win	5–3	Feb 2019	M15 Sharm El Sheikh, Egypt	World Tennis Tour	Hard	(Italy) Francesco Forti	(Zimbabwe) Benjamin Lock (Zimbabwe) Courtney John Lock	7–6^{(7–5)}, 6–7^{(5–7)}, [10–7]
Win	6–3	Mar 2019	M15 Sharm El Sheikh, Egypt	World Tennis Tour	Hard	(Italy) Francesco Forti	(Germany) Daniel Altmaier (Switzerland) Adrian Bodmer	4–6, 6–1, [10–7]
Win	7–3	Jul 2022	M15 Bergamo, Italy	World Tennis Tour	Clay	(Italy) Julian Ocleppo	(Argentina) Juan Ignacio Galarza (Slovenia) Tomás Lipovšek Puches	6–3, 7–6^{(7–3)}
Win	8–3	Aug 2022	M25 Caslano, Switzerland	World Tennis Tour	Clay	(Italy) Julian Ocleppo	(Germany) Kai Wehnelt (Germany) Patrick Zahraj	6–7^{(12–14)}, 6–2, [10–6]
Loss	8–4	Feb 2023	M25 Monastir, Tunisia	World Tennis Tour	Hard	(Italy) Francesco Forti	(France) Dan Added (France) Luca Sanchez	4–6, 6–7^{(5–7)}
