= Cordenons =

Cordenons Cordenòns (Friulian)
- Comune
- Città di Cordenons
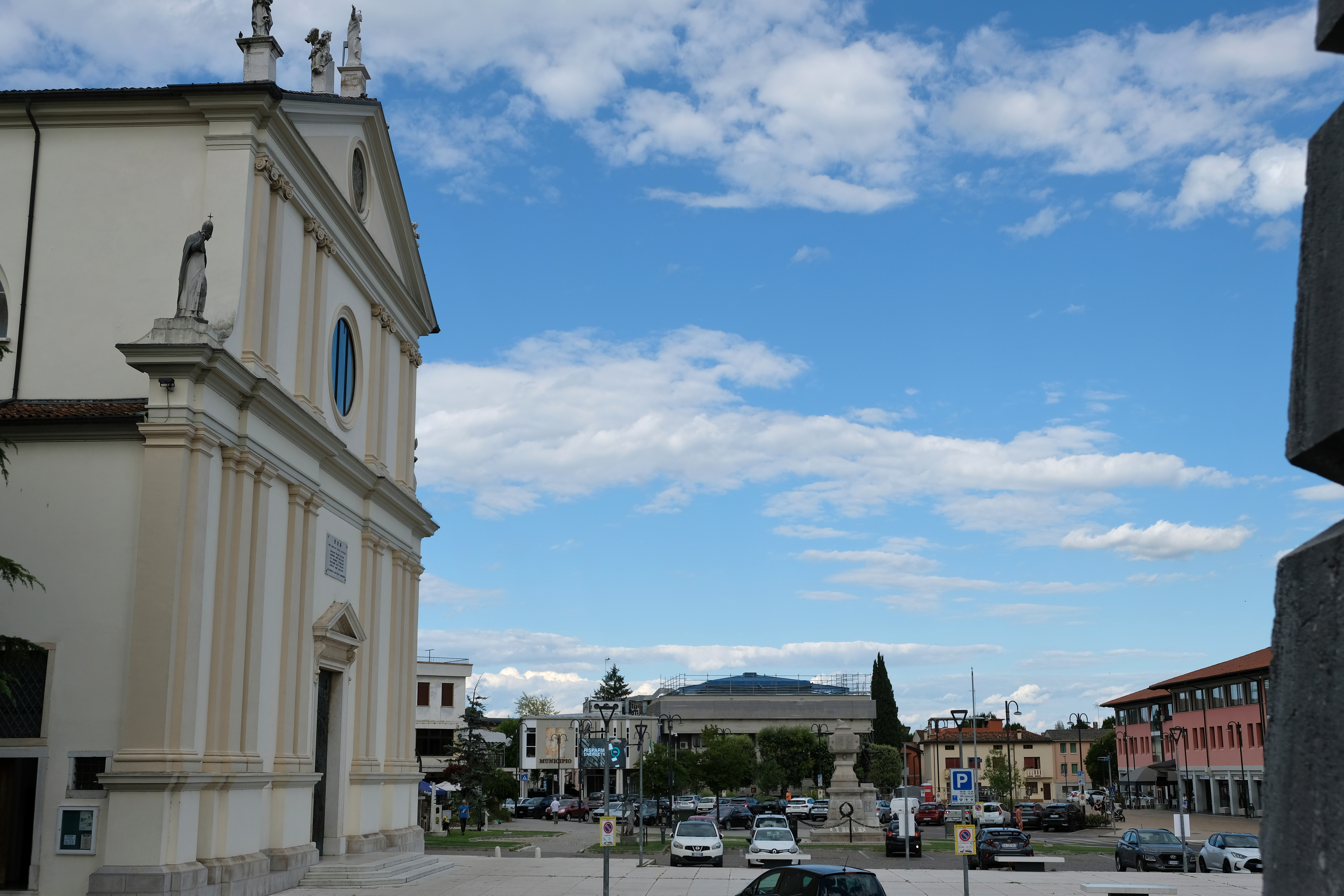
- Duomo and Town hall in Piazza della Vittoria (Victory Square)

- Location within Italy Location within Friuli-Venezia Giulia
- Coordinates: 45°59′N 12°42′E
- Country: Italy
- Region: Friuli-Venezia Giulia
- Province: Pordenone (PN)
- Frazioni: Nogaredo, Pasch, Romans, Sclavons, Villa d'Arco, Tramit

Government
  - Mayor: Mario Ongaro (Lega Nord)

Area
  - Total: 56.8 km^{2} (21.9 sq mi)
- Elevation: 44 m (144 ft)

Population (Sep. 2011)
  - Total: 18,433
  - Density: 325/km^{2} (841/sq mi)
- Demonym: Cordenonesi
- Time zone: UTC+1 (CET)
  - Summer (DST): UTC+2 (CEST)
- Postal code: 33084
- Dialing code: 0434
- Patron saint: St. Mary
- Saint day: October
- Website: http://www.comune.cordenons.pn.it www.comune.cordenons.pn.it

Cordenons (Friulian: Cordenòns) is a comune (municipality) in the Regional decentralization entity of Pordenone in the Italian region of Friuli-Venezia Giulia, located about 90 kilometres (56 mi) northwest of Trieste and about 4 kilometres (2.5 mi) northeast of Pordenone. As of 31 December 2004, it had a population of 17,738 and an area of 56.8 square kilometres (21.9 mi^{2}).

The municipality of Cordenons comprises the frazioni (boroughs) of Nogaredo, Pasch, Romans, Sclavons, and Villa d'Arco, Tramit.

Cordenons borders the following municipalities: Pordenone, San Giorgio della Richinvelda, San Quirino, Vivaro, Zoppola.

== History ==
In 1000 BC the population of the Veneti (from the present Czech Republic) migrated to this territory; they were followed by the Celts (800–700 BC). The unity of these communities (Celts and Veneti) founded the first nucleus of inhabitants of the area. With the coming of Rome the area became a Roman province. When the Postumia road was created, in order to defend trade, several roadblocks were created: Cordenons developed from one of them. In the following centuries the area was subjected to the invasions of the Visigoths (401-408 AD), Huns (452 AD), Longobards (568 AD).

The name appears officially for the first time in a diploma dated 5 May, 897, belonging to Berengario king of Italy. The name stems from Cortes Naonis (Court of the Naonis river). However the name does not reference a precise site instead a larger territory under the government of the Roman empire.

The Hungarian invasions, although disastrous did not signal the end of the village, since in 1029 it became an earldom of the house of Ozi of Bavaria and finally to that of the Habsburgs.

In 1500 AD the area was conquered by the Republic of Venice.

With the Napoleonic events, Cordenons became an autonomous municipality and after the end of the Republic of Venice, became territory of the Austro-Hungarian empire until 1866 when Cordenons was annexed to the Kingdom of Italy.

After the Second World War, Cordenons was invested with the Military Worth Bronze Medal for the support given to the Partisan Resistance.

In the contemporary period Cordenons developed paper, silk and cotton industries (the Mako).

== 21st century ==
Nowadays the industrial development of bigger centres is strangling the industries of Cordenons. Economy relies on agriculture and stock rearing. Cordenons is mainly used as a bedroom community as workers travel to adjacent (and not only) industrial centres: from Pordenone to Udine as well as Treviso and Trieste.

Several cultural activities managed by the municipality, have the scope to give life blood to the town, for example, the Philarmonic of Cordenons. The municipality also hosts the Internazionali di Tennis del Friuli Venezia Giulia tennis tournament.

The geographic texture is very interesting. The main characteristics are the “Magredi” (“poor soil”, arid and without water soil. Stones are the characteristic element of this soil) and the “Risorgive” (the site where the river resurfaces after an under ground path among the stones that constitute the permeable soil).

== Demographic evolution ==
Historical population

Year	Pop.	±%
1861	?	—
1871	4,765	—
1881	4,912	+3.1%
1901	7,148	+45.5%
1911	9,263	+29.6%

Year	Pop.	±%
1921	9,366	+1.1%
1931	9,973	+6.5%
1936	8,506	−14.7%
1951	9,110	+7.1%
1961	9,744	+7.0%

Year	Pop.	±%
1971	12,962	+33.0%
1981	14,613	+12.7%
1991	15,485	+6.0%
2001	16,991	+9.7%

Source: Data from ISTAT

== People ==
- Elio De Anna
- Nelson Debenedet, professional ice hockey player
