= Internazionali di Tennis del Friuli Venezia Giulia =

- 2026 Internazionali di Tennis del Friuli Venezia Giulia

Tournament information
- Event name: Serena Wines 1881 Acqua Maniva Tennis Cup
- Location: Cordenons, Italy
- Venue: Eurosporting
- Surface: Clay / outdoors
- Website: Website
ATP Tour
- Category: ATP Challenger Tour, Tretorn SERIE+
- Draw: 32S / 32Q / 16D
- Prize money: €74,825 (2024), €42,500+H
WTA Tour
- Category: ITF Women's Circuit
- Draw: 32S / 24Q / 16D
- Prize money: $60,000

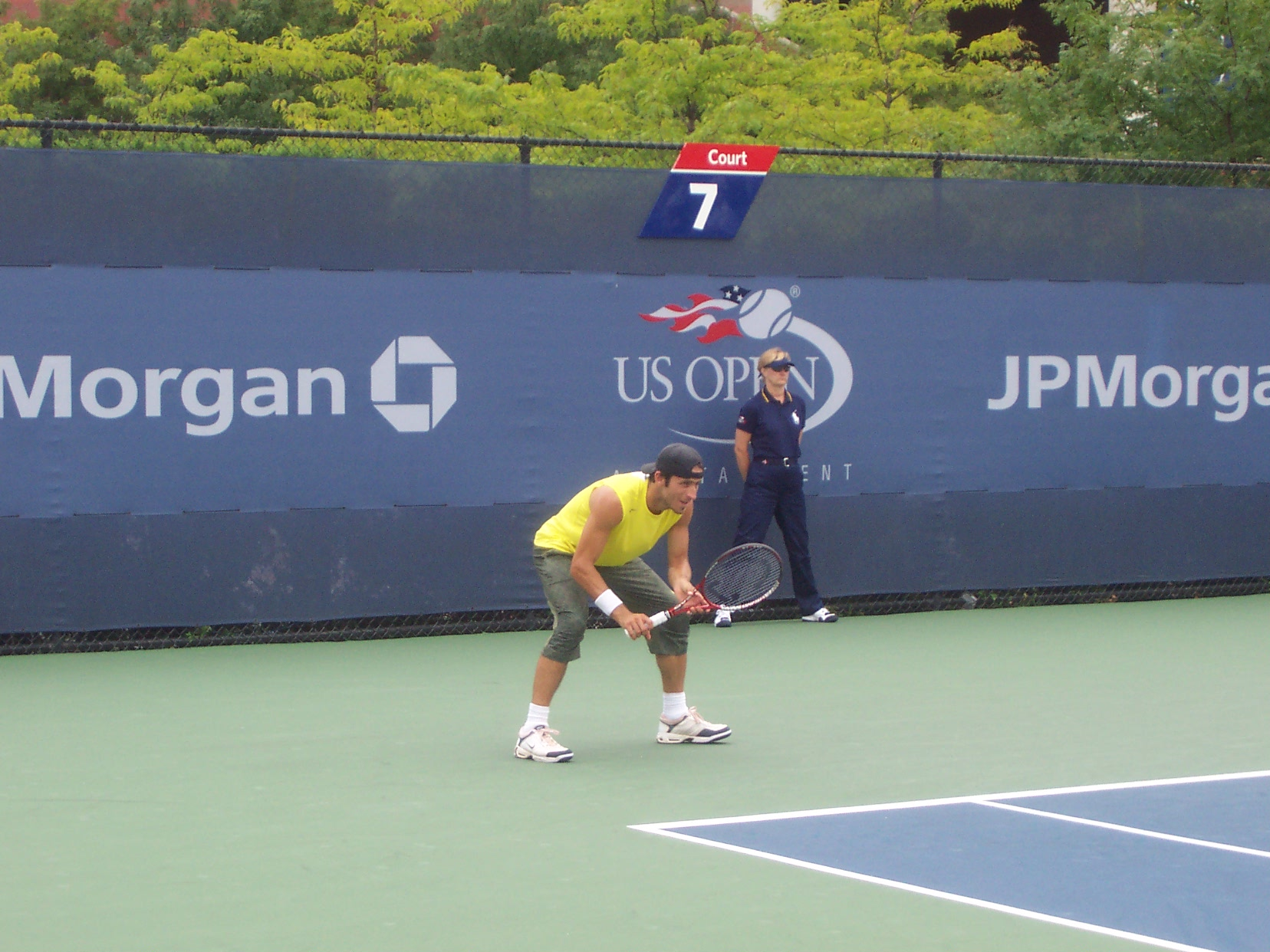
Greek player Konstantinos Economidis titled in Cordenons in the 2006 singles

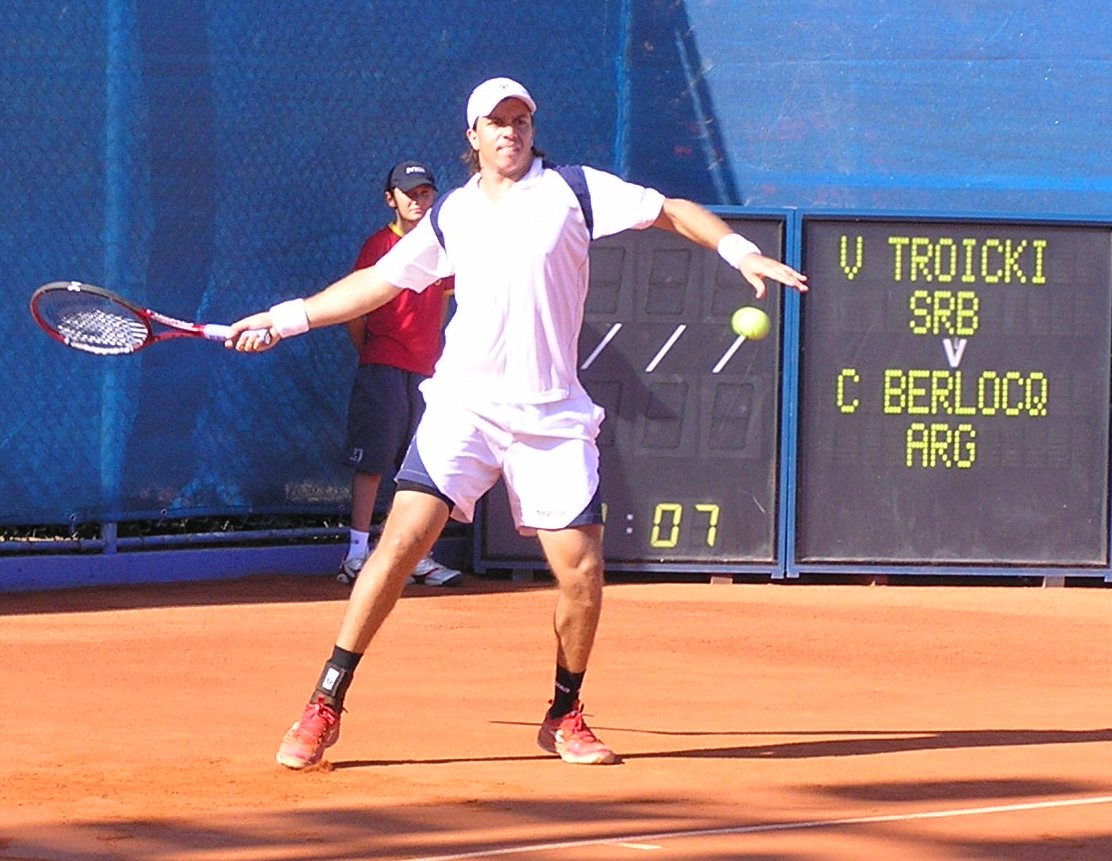
Argentina's Carlos Berlocq won the singles in 2005 over Jérôme Haehnel

The Serena Wines 1881 Acqua Maniva Tennis Cup (formerly Zucchetti Kos/Credit Agricole Friuladria Tennis Cup) Internazionali di Tennis del Friuli Venezia Giulia is a tennis tournament played on outdoor red clay courts since 2004. It is currently part of the ATP Challenger Tour and the ITF Women's Circuit. It is held annually at the Eurosporting Cordenons (at A.S.D. Eurotennis Club).

== Past finals ==
=== Men's singles ===
Year	Champion	Runner-up	Score
2026	(Spain) Max Alcalá Gurri	(Italy) Federico Bondioli	6–2, 6–0
2025	(Serbia) Dušan Lajović	(Austria) Lukas Neumayer	6–2, 7–6^{(7–3)}
2024	(Lithuania) Vilius Gaubas	(Spain) Carlos Taberner	2–6, 6–2, 6–4
2023	(Italy) Matteo Gigante	(Austria) Lukas Neumayer	6–0, 6–2
2022	(China) Zhang Zhizhen	(Italy) Andrea Vavassori	2–6, 7–6^{(7–5)}, 6–3
2021	(Argentina) Francisco Cerúndolo	(Argentina) Tomás Martín Etcheverry	6–1, 6–2
2020	(Spain) Bernabé Zapata Miralles	(Spain) Carlos Alcaraz	6–2, 4–6, 6–2
2019	(Australia) Christopher O'Connell	(Germany) Jeremy Jahn	7–5, 6–2
2018	(Italy) Paolo Lorenzi	(Hungary) Máté Valkusz	6–3, 3–6, 6–4
2017	(Sweden) Elias Ymer	(Spain) Roberto Carballés Baena	6–2, 6–3
2016	(Japan) Taro Daniel	(Spain) Daniel Gimeno Traver	6–3, 6–4
2015	(Serbia) Filip Krajinović	(Romania) Adrian Ungur	5–7, 6–4, 4–1 ret.
2014	(Spain) Albert Montañés	(Italy) Potito Starace	6–2, 6–4
2013	(Spain) Pablo Carreño Busta	(France) Grégoire Burquier	6–4, 6–4
2012	(Italy) Paolo Lorenzi	(Spain) Daniel Gimeno Traver	7–6^{(7–5)}, 6–3
2011	(Spain) Daniel Muñoz de la Nava	(Argentina) Nicolás Pastor	6–4, 2–6, 6–2
2010	(Belgium) Steve Darcis	(Spain) Daniel Muñoz de la Nava	6–2, 6–4
2009	(Australia) Peter Luczak	(Belgium) Olivier Rochus	6–3, 3–6, 6–1
2008	(Italy) Filippo Volandri	(Spain) Óscar Hernández	6–3, 7–5
2007	(Argentina) Máximo González	(Argentina) Mariano Puerta	2–6, 7–5, 7–5
2006	(Greece) Konstantinos Economidis	(France) Mathieu Montcourt	6–3, 6–2
2005	(Argentina) Carlos Berlocq	(France) Jérôme Haehnel	7–6^{(7–4)}, 6–4
2004	(Spain) Daniel Gimeno Traver	(Austria) Daniel Köllerer	4–6, 6–4, 6–3

=== Women's singles ===
Year	Champion	Runner-up	Score
2026	(Serbia) Mia Ristić	(Italy) Nuria Brancaccio	6–3, 6–3
2025	(Italy) Nuria Brancaccio	(Slovenia) Veronika Erjavec	6–2, 6–1
2024	(Netherlands) Anouk Koevermans	(Croatia) Lucija Ćirić Bagarić	7–6^{(7–4)}, 6–2
2023	(Slovenia) Veronika Erjavec	(Romania) Alexandra Ignatik	6–3, 6–4
2022	(Hungary) Panna Udvardy	Elina Avanesyan	6–2, 6–0
2021	(Japan) Mana Kawamura	(Slovenia) Veronika Erjavec	7–6^{(7–5)}, 7–5
2020	(China) Zheng Qinwen	(Austria) Mira Antonitsch	6–1, 6–0
2019	(Netherlands) Arantxa Rus	(Slovenia) Nika Radišić	4–6, 6–4, 6–1
2018	(Italy) Anastasia Grymalska	(Italy) Anastasia Piangerelli	6–1, 6–2
2017	(Italy) Anastasia Grymalska	(Switzerland) Lisa Sabino	6–2, 6–0
2016	(Romania) Laura-Ioana Andrei	(Germany) Laura Schaeder	6–4, 6–2

=== Men's doubles ===
Year	Champions	Runners-up	Score
2026	(Romania) Alexandru Jecan (Czech Republic) David Poljak	(Republic of Ireland) Charles Barry (Bulgaria) Anthony Genov	4–6, 7–6^{(7–4)}, [10–3]
2025	(Czech Republic) Andrew Paulson (Czech Republic) Michael Vrbenský	(Bolivia) Boris Arias (Bolivia) Murkel Dellien	6–4, 6–2
2024	(Italy) Marco Bortolotti (Australia) Matthew Romios	(Czech Republic) Jiří Barnat (Czech Republic) Andrew Paulson	walkover
2023	(Italy) Giovanni Fonio (Italy) Francesco Forti	(India) Niki Kaliyanda Poonacha (Australia) Adam Taylor	5–7, 6–1, [10–7]
2022	(Jamaica) Dustin Brown (Italy) Andrea Vavassori	(Serbia) Ivan Sabanov (Serbia) Matej Sabanov	6–4, 7–5
2021	(Brazil) Orlando Luz (Brazil) Rafael Matos	(Peru) Sergio Galdós (Argentina) Renzo Olivo	6–4, 7–6^{(7–5)}
2020	(Uruguay) Ariel Behar (Kazakhstan) Andrey Golubev	(Argentina) Andrés Molteni (Monaco) Hugo Nys	7–5, 6–4
2019	(Bosnia and Herzegovina) Tomislav Brkić (Croatia) Ante Pavić	(Serbia) Nikola Čačić (Croatia) Antonio Šančić	6–2, 6–3
2018	(Ukraine) Denys Molchanov (Slovakia) Igor Zelenay	(Slovakia) Andrej Martin (Spain) Daniel Muñoz de la Nava	3–6, 6–3, [11–9]
2017	(Czech Republic) Roman Jebavý (Czech Republic) Zdeněk Kolář	(Netherlands) Matwé Middelkoop (Slovakia) Igor Zelenay	6–2, 6–3
2016	(Germany) Andre Begemann (Belarus) Aliaksandr Bury	(Czech Republic) Roman Jebavý (Czech Republic) Zdeněk Kolář	5–7, 6–4, [11–9]
2015	(Slovakia) Andrej Martin (Slovakia) Igor Zelenay	(Croatia) Dino Marcan (Croatia) Antonio Šančić	6–4, 5–7, [10–8]
2014	(Italy) Potito Starace (Romania) Adrian Ungur	(Czech Republic) František Čermák (Czech Republic) Lukáš Dlouhý	6–2, 6–4
2013	(Croatia) Marin Draganja (Croatia) Franko Škugor	(Slovakia) Norbert Gomboš (Czech Republic) Roman Jebavý	6–4, 6–4
2012	(Czech Republic) Lukáš Dlouhý (Slovakia) Michal Mertiňák	(Germany) Philipp Marx (Romania) Florin Mergea	5–7, 7–5, [10–7]
2011	(Austria) Julian Knowle (Germany) Michael Kohlmann	(Australia) Colin Ebelthite (Australia) Adam Feeney	2–6, 7–5, [10–5]
2010	(Netherlands) Robin Haase (Netherlands) Rogier Wassen	(United States) James Cerretani (Canada) Adil Shamasdin	7–6^{(16–14)}, 7–5
2009	(United States) James Cerretani (United States) Travis Rettenmaier	(Australia) Peter Luczak (Italy) Alessandro Motti	4–6, 6–3, 11–9
2008	(Italy) Marco Crugnola (Italy) Alessio di Mauro	(Czech Republic) David Škoch (Slovakia) Igor Zelenay	1–6, 6–4, 10–6
2007	(Italy) Alessandro da Col (Italy) Andrea Stoppini	(Italy) Alberto Brizzi (Italy) Marco Pedrini	6–3, 7–6^{(7–5)}
2006	(Italy) Francesco Aldi (Croatia) Lovro Zovko	(Italy) Marco Crugnola (Italy) Marco Pedrini	6–4, 6–3
2005	play cancelled before the final		
2004	(Italy) Leonardo Azzaro (Hungary) Kornél Bardóczky	(Italy) Andrea Merati (Belgium) Christophe Rochus	6–2, 6–0

=== Women's doubles ===
Year	Champions	Runners-up	Score
2026	(Italy) Gaia Maduzzi (Italy) Vittoria Paganetti	(Finland) Laura Hietaranta (Latvia) Beatrise Zeltiņa	2–6, 6–4, [10–5]
2025	(Chinese Taipei) Liang En-shuo (Thailand) Peangtarn Plipuech	(Czech Republic) Karolína Kubáňová (Czech Republic) Aneta Laboutková	6–4, 6–2
2024	(Spain) Yvonne Cavallé Reimers (Italy) Aurora Zantedeschi	(Italy) Nuria Brancaccio (Spain) Leyre Romero Gormaz	7–5, 2–6, [10–5]
2023	(Italy) Angelica Moratelli (Italy) Camilla Rosatello	(Netherlands) Isabelle Haverlag (Netherlands) Eva Vedder	0–6, 6–2, [10–5]
2022	(Italy) Angelica Moratelli (Netherlands) Eva Vedder	(Colombia) Yuliana Lizarazo (Italy) Aurora Zantedeschi	6–3, 6–2
2021	(Italy) Martina Colmegna (United States) Amy Zhu	(Bosnia and Herzegovina) Nefisa Berberović (Slovenia) Veronika Erjavec	6–4, 6–3
2020	(Italy) Martina Colmegna (Italy) Federica Di Sarra	(Italy) Angelica Moratelli (Slovenia) Nika Radišić	6–2, 7–6^{(9–7)}
2019	(Slovenia) Veronika Erjavec (Slovenia) Nika Radišić	(Italy) Martina Caregaro (Switzerland) Lisa Sabino	6–3, 7–5
2018	(Italy) Lucia Bronzetti (Italy) Anastasia Grymalska	(Italy) Verena Hofer (Italy) Maria Vittoria Viviani	7–5, 7–5
2017	(Italy) Federica Di Sarra (Italy) Michele Alexandra Zmău	(Italy) Lucia Bronzetti (Italy) Ludmilla Samsonova	6–2, 1–6, [10–8]
2016	(Romania) Laura-Ioana Andrei (Ukraine) Anastasia Zarytska	(Switzerland) Nina Stadler (Germany) Caroline Werner	6–0, 7–6^{(7–3)}
