= 2025 Internazionali di Tennis Città di Trieste – Singles =

Singles
- 2025 Internazionali di Tennis Città di Trieste

Final
- Champion: (Croatia) Matej Dodig
- Runner-up: (Argentina) Thiago Agustín Tirante
- Score: 6–3, 6–4

Events
Singles	Doubles
← 2024 ·	Internazionali di Tennis Città di Trieste	· 2026 →

Federico Agustín Gómez was the defending champion but lost in the first round to Lukas Neumayer.

Matej Dodig won the title after defeating Thiago Agustín Tirante 6–3, 6–4 in the final.

== Seeds ==
1. (Chinese Taipei) Tseng Chun-hsin (first round)
2. (Chile) Tomás Barrios Vera (second round)
3. (Czech Republic) Dalibor Svrčina (first round)
4. (United States) Tristan Boyer (first round)
5. (Argentina) Thiago Agustín Tirante (final)
6. (Georgia (country)) Nikoloz Basilashvili (first round)
7. (Italy) Matteo Gigante (first round)
8. (Lithuania) Vilius Gaubas (first round)

== Draw ==
=== Key ===
- Q = Qualifier
- WC = Wild card
- LL = Lucky loser
- Alt = Alternate
- ITF = ITF entry
- PR = Protected ranking
- SR = Special ranking
- SE = Special exempt
- JE = Junior exempt
- JR = Junior Accelerator Programme entrant
- CO = College Accelerator Programme entrant
- NG = Next Gen Accelerator Program entrant
- w/o = Walkover
- r = Retired
- d = Defaulted

=== Finals ===
Semifinals
Q	(India) Sumit Nagal	3	4
Q	(Croatia) Matej Dodig	6	6
(Argentina) Facundo Díaz Acosta	4	4
5	(Argentina) Thiago Agustín Tirante	6	6

Final
Q	(Croatia) Matej Dodig	6	6
5	(Argentina) Thiago Agustín Tirante	3	4

=== Top half ===
First round
1	(Chinese Taipei) C-h Tseng	1	6	6^{5}
Q	(India) S Nagal	6	2	7^{7}
WC	(Italy) M Cecchinato	7^{7}	6
Alt	(Argentina) F Mena	6^{1}	0
(Argentina) JP Ficovich	7^{7}	5	3
WC	(Italy) F Cinà	6^{5}	7	6
Q	(Czech Republic) M Mrva	3	6	6
6	(Georgia (country)) N Basilashvili	6	2	0
3	(Czech Republic) D Svrčina	4	2
Q	(Croatia) M Dodig	6	6
(Austria) J Rodionov	2	6	0
WC	(Italy) G Zeppieri	6	4	0^{r}
(Argentina) FA Gómez	3	0
(Austria) L Neumayer	6	6
Q	(Argentina) A Collarini	7	7^{7}
7	(Italy) M Gigante	5	6^{4}

Second round
Q	(India) S Nagal	6	6
WC	(Italy) M Cecchinato	2	4
WC	(Italy) F Cinà	4	5
Q	(Czech Republic) M Mrva	6	7
Q	(Croatia) M Dodig	6	6
(Austria) J Rodionov	4	3
(Austria) L Neumayer	6	5	6
Q	(Argentina) A Collarini	4	7	4

Quarterfinals
Q	(India) S Nagal	6	3	6
Q	(Czech Republic) M Mrva	1	6	1
Q	(Croatia) M Dodig	7^{7}	6
(Austria) L Neumayer	6^{5}	2

Semifinals
Q	(India) S Nagal	3	4
Q	(Croatia) M Dodig	6	6

=== Bottom half ===
First round
8	(Lithuania) V Gaubas	7^{7}	2	4
(Slovakia) L Klein	6^{4}	6	6
(Argentina) F Díaz Acosta	6	6
(France) K Jacquet	3	0
(Ukraine) V Sachko	4	6	6
(Switzerland) J Kym	6	2	4
SE	(Italy) S Travaglia	7^{7}	6
4	(United States) T Boyer	6^{5}	3
5	(Argentina) TA Tirante	6	6
(Portugal) H Rocha	0	4
(France) U Blanchet	7^{7}	6
Q	(Italy) Andrea Picchione	6^{3}	2
(Argentina) S Rodríguez Taverna	7	6
Q	(Poland) D Michalski	5	2
NG	(France) A Géa	4	7^{7}	2
2	(Chile) T Barrios Vera	6	6^{2}	6

Second round
(Slovakia) L Klein	6^{7}	2
(Argentina) F Díaz Acosta	7^{9}	6
(Ukraine) V Sachko	6	6^{4}	2
SE	(Italy) S Travaglia	3	7^{7}	6
5	(Argentina) TA Tirante	6	6
(France) U Blanchet	1	1
(Argentina) S Rodríguez Taverna	6	6
2	(Chile) T Barrios Vera	3	4

Quarterfinals
(Argentina) F Díaz Acosta	6	6
SE	(Italy) S Travaglia	1	2
5	(Argentina) TA Tirante	6	6
(Argentina) S Rodríguez Taverna	2	2

Semifinals
(Argentina) F Díaz Acosta	4	4
5	(Argentina) TA Tirante	6	6
