= 2025 Internazionali di Tennis Città di Trieste – Doubles =

Doubles
- 2025 Internazionali di Tennis Città di Trieste

Final
- Champions: (Switzerland) Jakub Paul (Czech Republic) Matěj Vocel
- Runners-up: (Netherlands) Robin Haase (Denmark) Johannes Ingildsen
- Score: 7–5, 6–1

Events
Singles	Doubles
- Internazionali di Tennis Città di Trieste

Marco Bortolotti and Matthew Romios were the defending champions but only Romios chose to defend his title, partnering Piotr Matuszewski. They lost in the quarterfinals to Francesco Forti and Filippo Romano.

Jakub Paul and Matěj Vocel won the title after defeating Robin Haase and Johannes Ingildsen 7–5, 6–1 in the final.

== Seeds ==
1. (Poland) Piotr Matuszewski / (Australia) Matthew Romios (quarterfinals)
2. (Switzerland) Jakub Paul / (Czech Republic) Matěj Vocel (champions)
3. (Netherlands) Robin Haase / (Denmark) Johannes Ingildsen (final)
4. (Argentina) Federico Agustín Gómez / (Venezuela) Luis David Martínez (quarterfinals)

== Draw ==
Key

- Q = Qualifier
- WC = Wild card
- LL = Lucky loser
- Alt = Alternate
- ITF = ITF entry
- PR = Protected ranking
- SR = Special ranking
- SE = Special exempt
- JE = Junior exempt
- JR = Junior Accelerator Programme entrant
- CO = College Accelerator Programme entrant
- NG = Next Gen Accelerator Program entrant
- w/o = Walkover
- r = Retired
- d = Defaulted

=== Draw ===
First round
1	(Poland) P Matuszewski (Australia) MC Romios	6	6
WC	(Italy) Alessandro Pecci (Italy) Andrea Picchione	4	3
(Czech Republic) Jiří Barnat (Czech Republic) F Duda	2	1
PR	(Italy) F Forti (Italy) F Romano	6	6
3	(Netherlands) R Haase (Denmark) J Ingildsen	6	6
(Argentina) A Collarini (Bolivia) JC Prado Ángelo	3	2
(Slovakia) L Klein (Ukraine) D Molchanov	6	3	[10]
WC	(Italy) CA Caniato (Italy) Lorenzo Carboni	4	6	[12]
(Slovakia) M Karol (Ukraine) V Sachko	6^{5}	6	[9]
(Austria) D Pichler (Slovakia) L Pokorný	7^{7}	2	[11]
(Serbia) I Sabanov (Serbia) M Sabanov	6^{1}	7^{8}	[5]
4	(Argentina) FA Gómez (Venezuela) LD Martínez	7^{7}	6^{6}	[10]
PR	(Argentina) S Rodríguez Taverna (Netherlands) M Vervoort	1	7	[12]
(Bolivia) B Arias (Israel) R Stepanov	6	5	[10]
(Peru) A Huertas del Pino (Peru) C Huertas del Pino
2	(Switzerland) J Paul (Czech Republic) M Vocel	w/o

Quarterfinals
1	(Poland) P Matuszewski (Australia) MC Romios	6^{5}	3
PR	(Italy) F Forti (Italy) F Romano	7^{7}	6
3	(Netherlands) R Haase (Denmark) J Ingildsen	7	6
WC	(Italy) CA Caniato (Italy) L Carboni	5	0
(Austria) D Pichler (Slovakia) L Pokorný	6	4	[10]
4	(Argentina) FA Gómez (Venezuela) LD Martínez	3	6	[8]
PR	(Argentina) S Rodríguez Taverna (Netherlands) M Vervoort	2	1
2	(Switzerland) J Paul (Czech Republic) M Vocel	6	6

Semifinals
PR	(Italy) F Forti (Italy) F Romano	3	5
3	(Netherlands) R Haase (Denmark) J Ingildsen	6	7
(Austria) D Pichler (Slovakia) L Pokorný	2	6	[2]
2	(Switzerland) J Paul (Czech Republic) M Vocel	6	4	[10]

Final
3	(Netherlands) R Haase (Denmark) J Ingildsen	5	1
2	(Switzerland) J Paul (Czech Republic) M Vocel	7	6
