= 2026 Internazionali di Tennis Città di Trieste – Doubles =

Doubles
- 2026 Internazionali di Tennis Città di Trieste

Final
- Champions: (Croatia) Admir Kalender (Croatia) Nino Serdarušić
- Runners-up: (Netherlands) Jarno Jans (United Kingdom) Mark Whitehouse
- Score: 7–6^{(7–4)}, 6–4

Events
| Singles | Doubles |
- Internazionali di Tennis Città di Trieste

Jakub Paul and Matěj Vocel were the defending champions but chose not to defend their title.

Admir Kalender and Nino Serdarušić won the title after defeating Jarno Jans and Mark Whitehouse 7–6^{(7–4)}, 6–4 in the final.

== Seeds ==
1. (Bolivia) Boris Arias / (Denmark) Johannes Ingildsen (quarterfinals)
2. (Argentina) Federico Agustín Gómez / (Argentina) Mariano Kestelboim (semifinals)
3. (Spain) Mario Mansilla Díez / (Spain) Benjamín Winter López (quarterfinals)
4. (Croatia) Admir Kalender / (Croatia) Nino Serdarušić (champions)

== Draw ==
Key

- Q = Qualifier
- WC = Wild card
- LL = Lucky loser
- Alt = Alternate
- ITF = ITF entry
- PR = Protected ranking
- SR = Special ranking
- SE = Special exempt
- JE = Junior exempt
- JR = Junior Accelerator Programme entrant
- CO = College Accelerator Programme entrant
- NG = Next Gen Accelerator Program entrant
- w/o = Walkover
- r = Retired
- d = Defaulted

First round
1 | (Bolivia) B Arias (Denmark) J Ingildsen | 6 | 6
(Croatia) M Dodig (Peru) A Merino | 4 | 3
Alt | (Italy) F Agamenone (Italy) M Ribecai | 6 | 3 | [7]
(Netherlands) J Jans (United Kingdom) M Whitehouse | 4 | 6 | [10]
3 | (Spain) M Mansilla Díez (Spain) B Winter López | 7^{7} | 6
(Ecuador) Á Guillén Meza (Uruguay) F Roncadelli | 6^{2} | 2
(Czech Republic) A Paulson (Belgium) J Vliegen | 7^{7} | 6
(Italy) A Guerrieri (Italy) G Ricca | 6^{4} | 2
(Uruguay) I Carou (Argentina) G Villanueva | 2 | 2
WC | (Italy) Gabriele Crivellaro (Italy) Matteo Sciahbasi | 6 | 6
(Italy) R Brancaccio (Spain) N Sánchez Izquierdo
(United States) Zachary Fuchs (United States) Wally Thayne | w/o
WC | (Italy) Pietro Pampanin (Italy) Tommaso Pedretti | 0 | 6^{7}
2 | (Argentina) FA Gómez (Argentina) M Kestelboim | 6 | 7^{9}

Quarterfinals
1 | (Bolivia) B Arias (Denmark) J Ingildsen | 6^{6} | 7^{7} | [8]
(Netherlands) J Jans (United Kingdom) M Whitehouse | 7^{8} | 6^{2} | [10]
3 | (Spain) M Mansilla Díez (Spain) B Winter López | 6 | 2 | [7]
(Czech Republic) A Paulson (Belgium) J Vliegen | 3 | 6 | [10]
WC | (Italy) G Crivellaro (Italy) M Sciahbasi | 6^{4} | 1
4 | (Croatia) A Kalender (Croatia) N Serdarušić | 7^{7} | 6
(United States) Z Fuchs (United States) W Thayne | 6 | 3 | [7]
2 | (Argentina) FA Gómez (Argentina) M Kestelboim | 3 | 6 | [10]

Semifinals
(Netherlands) J Jans (United Kingdom) M Whitehouse | 6 | 7^{7}
(Czech Republic) A Paulson (Belgium) J Vliegen | 3 | 6^{5}
4 | (Croatia) A Kalender (Croatia) N Serdarušić | 6 | 7^{7}
2 | (Argentina) FA Gómez (Argentina) M Kestelboim | 4 | 6^{5}

Final
(Netherlands) J Jans (United Kingdom) M Whitehouse | 6^{4} | 4
4 | (Croatia) A Kalender (Croatia) N Serdarušić | 7^{7} | 6
