= 2022 Internazionali di Tennis Città di Trieste – Doubles =

Doubles
- 2022 Internazionali di Tennis Città di Trieste

Final
- Champions: (Ecuador) Diego Hidalgo (Colombia) Cristian Rodríguez
- Runners-up: (Italy) Marco Bortolotti (Spain) Sergio Martos Gornés
- Score: 4–6, 6–3, [10–5]

Events
Singles	Doubles
← 2021 ·	Internazionali di Tennis Città di Trieste	· 2023 →

Orlando Luz and Felipe Meligeni Alves were the defending champions but only Meligeni Alves chose to defend his title, partnering Marcelo Demoliner. Meligeni Alves lost in the quarterfinals to Marco Bortolotti and Sergio Martos Gornés.

Diego Hidalgo and Cristian Rodríguez won the title after defeating Bortolotti and Martos Gornés 4–6, 6–3, [10–5] in the final.

== Seeds ==
1. (Ecuador) Diego Hidalgo / (Colombia) Cristian Rodríguez (champions)
2. (Ukraine) Denys Molchanov / (Slovakia) Igor Zelenay (first round)
3. (Italy) Luciano Darderi / (Brazil) Fernando Romboli (first round)
4. (Monaco) Romain Arneodo / (France) Jonathan Eysseric (first round)

== Draw ==
=== Key ===
- Q = Qualifier
- WC = Wild card
- LL = Lucky loser
- Alt = Alternate
- ITF = ITF entry
- PR = Protected ranking
- SR = Special ranking
- SE = Special exempt
- JE = Junior exempt
- JR = Junior Accelerator Programme entrant
- CO = College Accelerator Programme entrant
- NG = Next Gen Accelerator Program entrant
- w/o = Walkover
- r = Retired
- d = Defaulted

First round
1	(Ecuador) D Hidalgo (Colombia) C Rodríguez	4	7^{11}	[10]
(Ukraine) V Manafov (Ukraine) O Prihodko	6	6^{9}	[6]
(Italy) F Agamenone (Argentina) G Durán	7	6
(Greece) M Kalovelonis (Greece) Pe Tsitsipas	5	3
4	(Monaco) R Arneodo (France) J Eysseric	1	3
(Netherlands) B Stevens (Netherlands) S Verbeek	6	6
(Argentina) A Collarini (Argentina) R Olivo	6	6
WC	(Italy) Luca Castagnola (Italy) Pietro Pampanin	4	4
(Brazil) P Boscardin Dias (Brazil) M Pucinelli de Almeida	7	2	[8]
WC	(Poland) Ł Kubot (Poland) S Walków	5	6	[10]
Alt	(Germany) F Fallert (Germany) H Jebens	7^{7}	6
3	(Italy) L Darderi (Brazil) F Romboli	6^{3}	2
(Italy) M Bortolotti (Spain) S Martos Gornés	6	6
Alt	Andrey Chepelev (Italy) G Oradini	3	3
(Brazil) M Demoliner (Brazil) F Meligeni Alves	6	6^{1}	[11]
2	(Ukraine) D Molchanov (Slovakia) I Zelenay	2	7^{7}	[9]

Quarterfinals
1	(Ecuador) D Hidalgo (Colombia) C Rodríguez	6	6
(Italy) F Agamenone (Argentina) G Durán	3	4
(Netherlands) B Stevens (Netherlands) S Verbeek	4	6^{4}
(Argentina) A Collarini (Argentina) R Olivo	6	7^{7}
WC	(Poland) Ł Kubot (Poland) S Walków	7^{8}	6
Alt	(Germany) F Fallert (Germany) H Jebens	6^{6}	3
(Italy) M Bortolotti (Spain) S Martos Gornés	6	6
(Brazil) M Demoliner (Brazil) F Meligeni Alves	4	4

Semifinals
1	(Ecuador) D Hidalgo (Colombia) C Rodríguez	3	7^{7}	[10]
(Argentina) A Collarini (Argentina) R Olivo	6	6^{5}	[5]
WC	(Poland) Ł Kubot (Poland) S Walków	3	3
(Italy) M Bortolotti (Spain) S Martos Gornés	6	6

Final
1	(Ecuador) D Hidalgo (Colombia) C Rodríguez	4	6	[10]
(Italy) M Bortolotti (Spain) S Martos Gornés	6	3	[5]
