= 2021 Internazionali di Tennis Città di Trieste – Singles =

Singles
- 2021 Internazionali di Tennis Città di Trieste

Final
- Champion: (Argentina) Tomás Martín Etcheverry
- Runner-up: (Argentina) Thiago Agustín Tirante
- Score: 6–1, 6–1

Events
Singles	Doubles
← 2020 ·	Internazionali di Tennis Città di Trieste	· 2022 →

Carlos Alcaraz was the defending champion but chose not to defend his title.

Tomás Martín Etcheverry won the title after defeating Thiago Agustín Tirante 6–1, 6–1 in the final.

== Seeds ==
1. (Bosnia and Herzegovina) Damir Džumhur (semifinals)
2. (France) Antoine Hoang (second round)
3. (Argentina) Tomás Martín Etcheverry (champion)
4. (Serbia) Danilo Petrović (withdrew)
5. (Italy) Alessandro Giannessi (second round)
6. (Argentina) Marco Trungelliti (first round, retired)
7. (Germany) Maximilian Marterer (semifinals)
8. (Italy) Thomas Fabbiano (first round)

== Draw ==
=== Key ===
- Q = Qualifier
- WC = Wild card
- LL = Lucky loser
- Alt = Alternate
- SE = Special exempt
- PR = Protected ranking
- ITF = ITF entry
- JE = Junior exempt
- w/o = Walkover
- r = Retired
- d = Defaulted
- SR = Special ranking

=== Finals ===
Semifinals
1	(Bosnia and Herzegovina) Damir Džumhur	3	3
Q	(Argentina) Thiago Agustín Tirante	6	6
3	(Argentina) Tomás Martín Etcheverry	7	7
Q	(Kazakhstan) Timofey Skatov	5	5

Final
Q	(Argentina) Thiago Agustín Tirante	1	1
3	(Argentina) Tomás Martín Etcheverry	6	6

=== Top half ===
First round
1	(Bosnia and Herzegovina) D Džumhur	6	7
(Argentina) A Collarini	0	5
(Serbia) P Krstin	6	6
Q	(Norway) V Durasovic	3	2
(Italy) G Zeppieri	3	6	6
Q	(Brazil) P Sakamoto	6	3	3
WC	(Italy) L Nardi	3	4
7	(Germany) M Marterer	6	6
Q	(Argentina) TA Tirante	6	6
(Italy) A Pellegrino	3	1
(Croatia) N Serdarušić	3	3
(Italy) R Bonadio	6	6
(Croatia) D Ajduković	7	3	3
PR	(Germany) J Lenz	5	6	6
LL	(Brazil) O Luz	4
6	(Argentina) M Trungelliti	2^{r}

Second round
1	(Bosnia and Herzegovina) D Džumhur	6	6
(Serbia) P Krstin	3	1
(Italy) G Zeppieri	4	6	6^{4}
7	(Germany) M Marterer	6	4	7^{7}
Q	(Argentina) TA Tirante	6	6
(Italy) R Bonadio	4	2
PR	(Germany) J Lenz	5	0
LL	(Brazil) O Luz	7	6

Quarterfinals
1	(Bosnia and Herzegovina) D Džumhur	6	6
7	(Germany) M Marterer	4	4
Q	(Argentina) TA Tirante	7	6
LL	(Brazil) O Luz	5	4

Semifinals
1	(Bosnia and Herzegovina) D Džumhur	3	3
Q	(Argentina) TA Tirante	6	6

=== Bottom half ===
First round
5	(Italy) A Giannessi	4	6	6
(Germany) R Molleker	6	2	1
(Italy) GM Moroni	2	6^{6}
(Ukraine) V Sachko	6	7^{8}
(Italy) A Arnaboldi	6^{3}	1
WC	(Netherlands) R Haase	7^{7}	6
(Argentina) C Ugo Carabelli	3	5
3	(Argentina) TM Etcheverry	6	7
8	(Italy) T Fabbiano	3	4
(Italy) L Giustino	6	6
Q	(Kazakhstan) T Skatov	7	5	6
(Switzerland) D Stricker	5	7	4
WC	(Italy) F Cobolli	7^{8}	6
(Czech Republic) M Vrbenský	6^{6}	3
(Brazil) F Meligeni Alves	7^{7}	6^{3}	1
2	(France) A Hoang	6^{5}	7^{7}	6

Second round
5	(Italy) A Giannessi	7^{10}	4	0
(Ukraine) V Sachko	6^{8}	6	6
WC	(Netherlands) R Haase	6	0	4
3	(Argentina) TM Etcheverry	4	6	6
(Italy) L Giustino	6	2	1
Q	(Kazakhstan) T Skatov	1	6	6
WC	(Italy) F Cobolli	6	6
2	(France) A Hoang	2	1

Quarterfinals
(Ukraine) V Sachko	4	4
3	(Argentina) TM Etcheverry	6	6
Q	(Kazakhstan) T Skatov	6^{5}	6	7^{8}
WC	(Italy) F Cobolli	7^{7}	1	6^{6}

Semifinals
3	(Argentina) TM Etcheverry	7	7
Q	(Kazakhstan) T Skatov	5	5
