= 2022 Internazionali di Tennis Città di Trieste – Singles =

Singles
- 2022 Internazionali di Tennis Città di Trieste

Final
- Champion: (Italy) Francesco Passaro
- Runner-up: (China) Zhang Zhizhen
- Score: 4–6, 6–3, 6–3

Events
Singles	Doubles
← 2021 ·	Internazionali di Tennis Città di Trieste	· 2023 →

Tomás Martín Etcheverry was the defending champion but chose not to defend his title.

Francesco Passaro won the title after defeating Zhang Zhizhen 4–6, 6–3, 6–3 in the final.

== Seeds ==
1. (Slovakia) Norbert Gombos (quarterfinals)
2. (Italy) Franco Agamenone (quarterfinals)
3. (Italy) Gianluca Mager (first round)
4. (Austria) Dennis Novak (first round)
5. (Italy) Marco Cecchinato (second round)
6. (Serbia) Nikola Milojević (first round)
7. (Argentina) Santiago Rodríguez Taverna (second round)
8. (France) Alexandre Müller (semifinals)

== Draw ==
=== Key ===
- Q = Qualifier
- WC = Wild card
- LL = Lucky loser
- Alt = Alternate
- SE = Special exempt
- PR = Protected ranking
- ITF = ITF entry
- JE = Junior exempt
- w/o = Walkover
- r = Retired
- d = Defaulted
- SR = Special ranking

=== Finals ===
Semifinals
(Italy) Francesco Passaro	6	6
SE	(Italy) Francesco Maestrelli	1	2
Q	(China) Zhang Zhizhen	6	6
8	(France) Alexandre Müller	3	2

Final
(Italy) Francesco Passaro	4	6	6
Q	(China) Zhang Zhizhen	6	3	3

=== Top half ===
First round
1	(Slovakia) N Gombos	6	6
(Italy) F Gaio	2	1
(Argentina) A Collarini	4	6	6
Alt	(Italy) L Darderi	6	1	3
(Italy) A Seppi	2	0
WC	(Italy) M Bellucci	6	6
(Italy) F Passaro	7	6
6	(Serbia) N Milojević	5	1
3	(Italy) G Mager	3	0
Alt	(Bosnia and Herzegovina) N Fatić	6	6
Q	(Italy) G Oradini	3	4
(Italy) S Caruso	6	6
SE	(Italy) F Maestrelli	6	6
Q	Andrey Chepelev	2	3
Q	(Latvia) E Gulbis	4	6^{2}
7	(Argentina) S Rodríguez Taverna	6	7^{7}

Second round
1	(Slovakia) N Gombos	6	6
(Argentina) A Collarini	3	2
WC	(Italy) M Bellucci	6^{2}	1
(Italy) F Passaro	7^{7}	6
Alt	(Bosnia and Herzegovina) N Fatić	3	6	3
(Italy) S Caruso	6	2	6
SE	(Italy) F Maestrelli	7	7^{7}
7	(Argentina) S Rodríguez Taverna	5	6^{2}

Quarterfinals
1	(Slovakia) N Gombos	3	6	2
(Italy) F Passaro	6	3	6
(Italy) S Caruso	3	3
SE	(Italy) F Maestrelli	6	6

Semifinals
(Italy) F Passaro	6	6
SE	(Italy) F Maestrelli	1	2

=== Bottom half ===
First round
5/WC	(Italy) M Cecchinato	1	6	7
(Slovakia) A Martin	6	4	5
(Brazil) M Pucinelli de Almeida	3	2
Q	(China) Zh Zhang	6	6
(France) G Blancaneaux	6	7^{7}
(France) G Simon	3	6^{4}
(Brazil) F Meligeni Alves	2	7	6
4	(Austria) D Novak	6	5	4
8	(France) A Müller	5	6	6
(Italy) A Pellegrino	7	3	2
WC	(Italy) M Gigante	6	3	4
Q	(Austria) L Neumayer	1	6	6
Q	(Italy) Samuel Vincent Ruggeri	2	4
(Argentina) R Olivo	6	6
(Italy) A Arnaboldi	4	3^{r}
2	(Italy) F Agamenone	6	2

Second round
5/WC	(Italy) M Cecchinato	3	2
Q	(China) Zh Zhang	6	6
(France) G Blancaneaux	7^{8}	2	6^{3}
(Brazil) F Meligeni Alves	6^{6}	6	7^{7}
8	(France) A Müller	7	6
Q	(Austria) L Neumayer	5	0
(Argentina) R Olivo	6	5	1
2	(Italy) F Agamenone	1	7	6

Quarterfinals
Q	(China) Zh Zhang	2	6	6
(Brazil) F Meligeni Alves	6	3	3
8	(France) A Müller	6	6^{4}	6
2	(Italy) F Agamenone	0	7^{7}	2

Semifinals
Q	(China) Zh Zhang	6	6
8	(France) A Müller	3	2
