= 2026 Internazionali di Tennis Città di Trieste – Singles =

Singles
- 2026 Internazionali di Tennis Città di Trieste

Final
- Champion: (Bolivia) Hugo Dellien
- Runner-up: (Croatia) Matej Dodig
- Score: 5–7, 6–4, 6–2

Events
Singles	Doubles
- Internazionali di Tennis Città di Trieste

Matej Dodig was the defending champion but lost in the final to Hugo Dellien.

Dellien won the title after defeating Dodig 5–7, 6–4, 6–2 in the final.

== Seeds ==
1. (Italy) Andrea Pellegrino (second round)
2. (Bolivia) Hugo Dellien (champion)
3. (Austria) Lukas Neumayer (quarterfinals)
4. (Austria) Joel Schwärzler (first round)
5. (Italy) Francesco Passaro (second round)
6. (Croatia) Matej Dodig (final)
7. (Argentina) Federico Agustín Gómez (second round)
8. (Spain) Nikolás Sánchez Izquierdo (quarterfinals)

== Draw ==
Key

- Q = Qualifier
- WC = Wild card
- LL = Lucky loser
- Alt = Alternate
- ITF = ITF entry
- PR = Protected ranking
- SR = Special ranking
- SE = Special exempt
- JE = Junior exempt
- JR = Junior Accelerator Programme entrant
- CO = College Accelerator Programme entrant
- NG = Next Gen Accelerator Program entrant
- w/o = Walkover
- r = Retired
- d = Defaulted

=== Finals ===
Semifinals
6	(Croatia) Matej Dodig	6	3	6
(Germany) Henri Squire	4	6	3
Q	(Switzerland) Henry Bernet	6	6^{4}	4
2	(Bolivia) Hugo Dellien	4	7^{7}	6

Final
6	(Croatia) Matej Dodig	7	4	2
2	(Bolivia) Hugo Dellien	5	6	6

=== Top half ===
First round
1/WC	(Italy) A Pellegrino	6	6
(Spain) M Alcalá Gurri	3	4
(Italy) R Brancaccio	7^{7}	3	6
(Italy) F Agamenone	6^{3}	6	3
(Uruguay) F Roncadelli	3	3
WC	(Italy) M Ribecai	6	6
(India) S Nagal	2	4
6	(Croatia) M Dodig	6	6
3	(Austria) L Neumayer	6	6
(Bosnia and Herzegovina) A Nedić	4	3
(Argentina) GI Justo	6	6
Q	(Ukraine) G Kravchenko	4	0
(Germany) H Squire	7^{7}	7^{7}
(Ecuador) Á Guillén Meza	6^{5}	6^{5}
Q	(Italy) Pietro Fellin	3	1^{r}
5	(Italy) F Passaro	6	3

Second round
1/WC	(Italy) A Pellegrino	6	4	3
(Italy) R Brancaccio	3	6	6
WC	(Italy) M Ribecai	6	5	4
6	(Croatia) M Dodig	4	7	6
3	(Austria) L Neumayer	6	5	6
(Argentina) GI Justo	4	7	4
(Germany) H Squire	5	6	7
5	(Italy) F Passaro	7	4	5

Quarterfinals
(Italy) R Brancaccio	6^{5}	1
6	(Croatia) M Dodig	7^{7}	6
3	(Austria) L Neumayer	2	3
(Germany) H Squire	6	6

Semifinals
6	(Croatia) M Dodig	6	3	6
(Germany) H Squire	4	6	3

=== Bottom half ===
First round
7	(Argentina) FA Gómez	6	4	6
Q	(Italy) E Dalla Valle	4	6	4
WC	(Italy) Juan Cruz Martin Manzano	7^{12}	4	3
Q	(Switzerland) H Bernet	6^{10}	6	6
NG	(Czech Republic) M Mrva	5	7^{8}	6
Q	(Argentina) G Villanueva	7	6^{6}	4
Alt	(Italy) F Bondioli	3	6	7
4	(Austria) J Schwärzler	6	3	5
8	(Spain) N Sánchez Izquierdo	7^{9}	2	6
CO	(Switzerland) D Dietrich	6^{7}	6	3
Q	(North Macedonia) O Prihodko	4	4
(Argentina) A Barrena	6	6
(Italy) A Guerrieri	6	6
Alt	(Spain) O Roca Batalla	4	4
Alt	(Italy) CA Caniato	3	5
2	(Bolivia) H Dellien	6	7

Second round
7	(Argentina) FA Gómez	3	7^{12}	3
Q	(Switzerland) H Bernet	6	6^{10}	6
NG	(Czech Republic) M Mrva	5	0
Alt	(Italy) F Bondioli	7	6
8	(Spain) N Sánchez Izquierdo	6	6
(Argentina) A Barrena	4	3
(Italy) A Guerrieri	1	2
2	(Bolivia) H Dellien	6	6

Quarterfinals
Q	(Switzerland) H Bernet	2	7^{10}	6
Alt	(Italy) F Bondioli	6	6^{8}	3
8	(Spain) N Sánchez Izquierdo	6	0	5
2	(Bolivia) H Dellien	3	6	7

Semifinals
Q	(Switzerland) H Bernet	6	6^{4}	4
2	(Bolivia) H Dellien	4	7^{7}	6
