= 2021 Internazionali di Tennis Città di Trieste – Doubles =

Doubles
- 2021 Internazionali di Tennis Città di Trieste

Final
- Champions: (Brazil) Orlando Luz (Brazil) Felipe Meligeni Alves
- Runners-up: (France) Antoine Hoang (France) Albano Olivetti
- Score: 7–5, 6–7^{(6–8)}, [10–5]

Events
Singles	Doubles
← 2020 ·	Internazionali di Tennis Città di Trieste	· 2022 →

Ariel Behar and Andrey Golubev were the defending champions but chose not to defend their title.

Orlando Luz and Felipe Meligeni Alves won the title after defeating Antoine Hoang and Albano Olivetti 7–5, 6–7^{(6–8)}, [10–5] in the final.

== Seeds ==
1. (Brazil) Orlando Luz / (Brazil) Felipe Meligeni Alves (champions)
2. (France) Antoine Hoang / (France) Albano Olivetti (final)
3. (France) Dan Added / (Ukraine) Vitaliy Sachko (semifinals)
4. (Uruguay) Martín Cuevas / (Italy) Andrea Pellegrino (quarterfinals)

== Draw ==
=== Key ===
- Q = Qualifier
- WC = Wild card
- LL = Lucky loser
- Alt = Alternate
- SE = Special exempt
- PR = Protected ranking
- ITF = ITF entry
- JE = Junior exempt
- w/o = Walkover
- r = Retired
- d = Defaulted
- SR = Special ranking

First round
1	(Brazil) O Luz (Brazil) F Meligeni Alves	w/o
(Bosnia and Herzegovina) D Džumhur (Bosnia and Herzegovina) N Fatić
(Italy) M Bortolotti (Zimbabwe) B Lock	6^{5}	6	[7]
(Russia) A Dubrivnyy (Kazakhstan) D Yevseyev	7^{7}	2	[10]
(Italy) F Forti (Italy) G Zeppieri	4
WC	(Italy) Pietro Pampanin (Italy) Daniele Valentino	1^{r}
(Italy) R Bonadio (Czech Republic) M Vrbenský	6	6
PR	(Italy) A Motti (Italy) J Ocleppo	1	2
WC	(Italy) Matteo Marfia (Italy) Augusto Virgili	3	2
3	(France) D Added (Ukraine) V Sachko	6	6
WC	(Switzerland) R Bertola (Italy) G Fonio	7	6
(Argentina) A Collarini (Brazil) P Sakamoto	5	3
(Argentina) H Casanova (Argentina) C Ugo Carabelli	3	3
2	(France) A Hoang (France) A Olivetti	6	6

Quarterfinals
1	(Brazil) O Luz (Brazil) F Meligeni Alves	6	7
(Russia) A Dubrivnyy (Kazakhstan) D Yevseyev	4	5
4	(Uruguay) M Cuevas (Italy) A Pellegrino	3	2
(Italy) F Forti (Italy) G Zeppieri	6	6
(Italy) R Bonadio (Czech Republic) M Vrbenský	2	3
3	(France) D Added (Ukraine) V Sachko	6	6
WC	(Switzerland) R Bertola (Italy) G Fonio	6	2	[7]
2	(France) A Hoang (France) A Olivetti	4	6	[10]

Semifinals
1	(Brazil) O Luz (Brazil) F Meligeni Alves	6	3	[10]
(Italy) F Forti (Italy) G Zeppieri	4	6	[3]
3	(France) D Added (Ukraine) V Sachko	6	5	[7]
2	(France) A Hoang (France) A Olivetti	0	7	[10]

Final
1	(Brazil) O Luz (Brazil) F Meligeni Alves	7	6^{6}	[10]
2	(France) A Hoang (France) A Olivetti	5	7^{8}	[5]
