= 2025 Internazionali di Tennis Città di Trieste =

- Date: 7 – 13 July
- Edition: 6th
- Surface: Clay
- Location: Trieste, Italy

Champions

Singles
- (Croatia) Matej Dodig

Doubles
- (Switzerland) Jakub Paul / (Czech Republic) Matěj Vocel
← 2024 ·	Internazionali di Tennis Città di Trieste	· 2026 →

The 2025 Internazionali di Tennis Città di Trieste was a professional tennis tournament played on clay courts. It was the 6th edition of the tournament which was part of the 2025 ATP Challenger Tour. It took place in Trieste, Italy between 7 and 13 July 2025.

== Singles main-draw entrants ==
=== Seeds ===
Country	Player	Rank^{1}	Seed
TPE	Tseng Chun-hsin	96	1
CHI	Tomás Barrios Vera	108	2
CZE	Dalibor Svrčina	114	3
USA	Tristan Boyer	120	4
ARG	Thiago Agustín Tirante	121	5
GEO	Nikoloz Basilashvili	126	6
ITA	Matteo Gigante	133	7
LTU	Vilius Gaubas	140	8

- ^{1} Rankings are as of 30 June 2025.

=== Other entrants ===
The following players received wildcards into the singles main draw:

- (Italy) Marco Cecchinato
- (Italy) Federico Cinà
- (Italy) Giulio Zeppieri

The following player received entry into the singles main draw as a special exempt:

- (Italy) Stefano Travaglia

The following player received entry into the singles main draw through the Next Gen Accelerator programme:

- (France) Arthur Géa

The following player received entry into the singles main draw as an alternate:

- (Argentina) Facundo Mena

The following players received entry from the qualifying draw:

- (Argentina) Andrea Collarini
- (Croatia) Matej Dodig
- (Poland) Daniel Michalski
- (Czech Republic) Maxim Mrva
- (India) Sumit Nagal
- (Italy) Andrea Picchione

== Champions ==
=== Singles ===
- (Croatia) Matej Dodig def. (Argentina) Thiago Agustín Tirante 6–3, 6–4.

=== Doubles ===
- (Switzerland) Jakub Paul / (Czech Republic) Matěj Vocel def. (Netherlands) Robin Haase / (Denmark) Johannes Ingildsen 7–5, 6–1.
