= 2024 Internazionali di Tennis Città di Trieste – Doubles =

Doubles
- 2024 Internazionali di Tennis Città di Trieste

Final
- Champions: (Italy) Marco Bortolotti (Australia) Matthew Romios
- Runners-up: (Brazil) Daniel Dutra da Silva (Zimbabwe) Courtney John Lock
- Score: 6–2, 7–6^{(8–6)}

Events
Singles	Doubles
- Internazionali di Tennis Città di Trieste

Matthew Romios and Jason Taylor were the defending champions but only Romios chose to defend his title, partnering Marco Bortolotti. He successfully defended his title after defeating Daniel Dutra da Silva and Courtney John Lock in the final.

Bortolotti and Romios won the title after defeating Dutra da Silva and Lock 6–2, 7–6^{(8–6)} in the final.

== Seeds ==
1. (Germany) Andre Begemann / (Romania) Victor Vlad Cornea (first round)
2. (Brazil) Orlando Luz / (Brazil) Marcelo Zormann (quarterfinals)
3. (Italy) Marco Bortolotti / (Australia) Matthew Romios (champions)
4. (India) Rithvik Choudary Bollipalli / (India) Niki Kaliyanda Poonacha (semifinals)

== Draw ==
Key

- Q = Qualifier
- WC = Wild card
- LL = Lucky loser
- Alt = Alternate
- ITF = ITF entry
- PR = Protected ranking
- SR = Special ranking
- SE = Special exempt
- JE = Junior exempt
- JR = Junior Accelerator Programme entrant
- CO = College Accelerator Programme entrant
- NG = Next Gen Accelerator Program entrant
- w/o = Walkover
- r = Retired
- d = Defaulted

=== Draw ===
First round
1	(Germany) A Begemann (Romania) V Cornea	6	6^{6}	[9]
(Spain) O Roca Batalla (Spain) N Sánchez Izquierdo	4	7^{8}	[11]
PR	(Australia) B Bayldon (Netherlands) M Hermans	w/o
(Italy) F Maestrelli (Italy) A Pellegrino
3	(Italy) M Bortolotti (Australia) MC Romios	6	7
(Uruguay) I Carou (Brazil) Gabriel Roveri Sidney	3	5
(Argentina) FA Gómez (Greece) Pe Tsitsipas	7^{7}	6^{14}	[10]
WC	(Italy) F Forti (Italy) F Romano	6^{4}	7^{16}	[2]
(Spain) Í Cervantes (Switzerland) L Margaroli	6	6
(South Korea) J-s Nam (Finland) P Niklas-Salminen	4	4
Alt	(Croatia) Z Babić (Croatia) L Mikrut	2	6	[6]
4	(India) RC Bollipalli (India) N Kaliyanda Poonacha	6	3	[10]
PR	(Brazil) D Dutra da Silva (Zimbabwe) CJ Lock	6	6
Alt	Svyatoslav Gulin (Spain) Carlos López Montagud	3	4
(Italy) E Dalla Valle (Italy) Samuel Vincent Ruggeri
2	(Brazil) O Luz (Brazil) M Zormann	w/o

Quarterfinals
(Spain) O Roca Batalla (Spain) N Sánchez Izquierdo
PR	(Australia) B Bayldon (Netherlands) M Hermans	w/o
3	(Italy) M Bortolotti (Australia) MC Romios	6	6
(Argentina) FA Gómez (Greece) Pe Tsitsipas	4	4
(Spain) Í Cervantes (Switzerland) L Margaroli	6	1	[7]
4	(India) RC Bollipalli (India) N Kaliyanda Poonacha	2	6	[10]
PR	(Brazil) D Dutra da Silva (Zimbabwe) CJ Lock	4	6	[10]
2	(Brazil) O Luz (Brazil) M Zormann	6	4	[8]

Semifinals
PR	(Australia) B Bayldon (Netherlands) M Hermans	4	7	[5]
3	(Italy) M Bortolotti (Australia) MC Romios	6	5	[10]
4	(India) RC Bollipalli (India) N Kaliyanda Poonacha	4	6	[5]
PR	(Brazil) D Dutra da Silva (Zimbabwe) CJ Lock	6	3	[10]

Final
3	(Italy) M Bortolotti (Australia) MC Romios	6	7^{8}
PR	(Brazil) D Dutra da Silva (Zimbabwe) CJ Lock	2	6^{6}
