= 2020 Internazionali di Tennis Città di Trieste – Singles =

Singles
- 2020 Internazionali di Tennis Città di Trieste

Final
- Champion: (Spain) Carlos Alcaraz
- Runner-up: (Italy) Riccardo Bonadio
- Score: 6–4, 6–3

Events
Singles	Doubles
Internazionali di Tennis Città di Trieste	· 2021 →

This was the first edition of the tournament.

Carlos Alcaraz won the title after defeating Riccardo Bonadio 6–4, 6–3 in the final.

== Seeds ==
1. (Australia) Alexei Popyrin (second round)
2. (France) Antoine Hoang (first round)
3. (Germany) Yannick Hanfmann (second round)
4. (Italy) Lorenzo Giustino (first round)
5. (Italy) Roberto Marcora (first round)
6. (Italy) Alessandro Giannessi (first round)
7. (Austria) Jurij Rodionov (first round)
8. (Slovakia) Lukáš Lacko (first round)

== Draw ==
=== Key ===
- Q = Qualifier
- WC = Wild card
- LL = Lucky loser
- Alt = Alternate
- SE = Special exempt
- PR = Protected ranking
- ITF = ITF entry
- JE = Junior exempt
- w/o = Walkover
- r = Retired
- d = Defaulted
- SR = Special ranking

=== Finals ===
Semifinals
WC	(Italy) Lorenzo Musetti	5	6	3
Q	(Spain) Carlos Alcaraz	7	2	6
(Spain) Mario Vilella Martínez	6^{5}	2
Q	(Italy) Riccardo Bonadio	7^{7}	6

Final
Q	(Spain) Carlos Alcaraz	6	6
Q	(Italy) Riccardo Bonadio	4	3

=== Top half ===
First round
1	(Australia) A Popyrin	6	7^{7}
(France) Q Halys	4	6^{3}
(Germany) D Altmaier	3	2
WC	(Italy) L Musetti	6	6
WC	(Italy) M Gigante	6	6
(Italy) F Baldi	2	2
(Argentina) JP Ficovich	7	7
8	(Slovakia) L Lacko	5	5
4	(Italy) L Giustino	4	2
(Italy) M Viola	6	6
(France) M Bourgue	3	3
Q	(Spain) C Alcaraz	6	6
(Argentina) F Mena	0	1
(Germany) M Moraing	6	6
Q	(Argentina) TM Etcheverry	6	4	6
6	(Italy) A Giannessi	3	6	1

Second round
1	(Australia) A Popyrin	5	3
WC	(Italy) L Musetti	7	6
WC	(Italy) M Gigante	2	4
(Argentina) JP Ficovich	6	6
(Italy) M Viola	4	2
Q	(Spain) C Alcaraz	6	6
(Germany) M Moraing	3	4
Q	(Argentina) TM Etcheverry	6	6

Quarterfinals
WC	(Italy) L Musetti	6	6
(Argentina) JP Ficovich	1	3
Q	(Spain) C Alcaraz	7^{7}	6
Q	(Argentina) TM Etcheverry	6^{2}	3

Semifinals
WC	(Italy) L Musetti	5	6	3
Q	(Spain) C Alcaraz	7	2	6

=== Bottom half ===
First round
5	(Italy) R Marcora	4	2
LL	(Germany) T Kamke	6	6
(Argentina) M Trungelliti	3	6^{3}
(United Kingdom) L Broady	6	7^{7}
WC	(Italy) G Zeppieri	1	3
(Spain) M Vilella Martínez	6	6
LL	(Croatia) V Galović	2	6	1
3	(Germany) Y Hanfmann	6	3	6
7	(Austria) J Rodionov	6^{3}	4
Q	(Italy) R Bonadio	7^{7}	6
(Dominican Republic) R Cid Subervi	6	2
Q	(France) G Blancaneaux	4	0^{r}
(France) H Gaston	1	2
PR	(Germany) M Marterer	6	6
(Argentina) A Collarini	1	6	6
2	(France) A Hoang	6	2	4

Second round
LL	(Germany) T Kamke	6^{7}	2
(United Kingdom) L Broady	7^{9}	6
(Spain) M Vilella Martínez	4	6	6
3	(Germany) Y Hanfmann	6	3	2
Q	(Italy) R Bonadio	4	6	6
(Dominican Republic) R Cid Subervi	6	3	3
PR	(Germany) M Marterer	7^{11}	7^{8}
(Argentina) A Collarini	6^{9}	6^{6}

Quarterfinals
(United Kingdom) L Broady	7^{11}	4	4
(Spain) M Vilella Martínez	6^{9}	6	6
Q	(Italy) R Bonadio	2	7	6
PR	(Germany) M Marterer	6	5	4

Semifinals
(Spain) M Vilella Martínez	6^{5}	2
Q	(Italy) R Bonadio	7^{7}	6
