= 2022 Internazionali di Tennis Città di Trieste =

- Date: 18 – 24 July
- Edition: 3rd
- Surface: Clay
- Location: Trieste, Italy

Champions

Singles
- (Italy) Francesco Passaro

Doubles
- (Ecuador) Diego Hidalgo / (Colombia) Cristian Rodríguez
← 2021 ·	Internazionali di Tennis Città di Trieste	· 2023 →

The 2022 Internazionali di Tennis Città di Trieste was a professional tennis tournament played on clay courts. It was the 3rd edition of the tournament which was part of the 2022 ATP Challenger Tour. It took place in Trieste, Italy between 18 and 24 July 2022.

== Singles main-draw entrants ==
=== Seeds ===
Country	Player	Rank^{1}	Seed
SVK	Norbert Gombos	112	1
ITA	Franco Agamenone	144	2
ITA	Gianluca Mager	147	3
AUT	Dennis Novak	153	4
ITA	Marco Cecchinato	154	5
SRB	Nikola Milojević	156	6
ARG	Santiago Rodríguez Taverna	161	7
FRA	Alexandre Müller	162	8

- ^{1} Rankings are as of 11 July 2022.

=== Other entrants ===
The following players received wildcards into the singles main draw:

- (Italy) Mattia Bellucci
- (Italy) Marco Cecchinato
- (Italy) Matteo Gigante

The following player received entry into the singles main draw as a special exempt:

- (Italy) Francesco Maestrelli

The following players received entry into the singles main draw as alternates:

- (Italy) Luciano Darderi
- (Bosnia and Herzegovina) Nerman Fatić

The following players received entry from the qualifying draw:

- Andrey Chepelev
- (Latvia) Ernests Gulbis
- (Austria) Lukas Neumayer
- (Italy) Giovanni Oradini
- (Italy) Samuel Vincent Ruggeri
- (China) Zhang Zhizhen

== Champions ==
=== Singles ===
- (Italy) Francesco Passaro def. (China) Zhang Zhizhen 4–6, 6–3, 6–3.

=== Doubles ===
- (Ecuador) Diego Hidalgo / (Colombia) Cristian Rodríguez def. (Italy) Marco Bortolotti / (Spain) Sergio Martos Gornés 4–6, 6–3, [10–5].
