= 2020 Internazionali di Tennis Città di Trieste =

- Date: 24–30 August
- Edition: 1st
- Surface: Clay
- Location: Trieste, Italy

Champions

Singles
- (Spain) Carlos Alcaraz

Doubles
- (Uruguay) Ariel Behar / (Kazakhstan) Andrey Golubev
| Internazionali di Tennis Città di Trieste | · 2021 → |

The 2020 Internazionali di Tennis Città di Trieste was a professional tennis tournament played on clay courts. It was the 1st edition of the tournament which was part of the 2020 ATP Challenger Tour. It took place in Trieste, Italy between 24 and 30 August 2020.

== Singles main-draw entrants ==
=== Seeds ===
| Country | Player | Rank^{1} | Seed |
|---|---|---|---|
| AUS | Alexei Popyrin | 103 | 1 |
| FRA | Antoine Hoang | 136 | 2 |
| GER | Yannick Hanfmann | 143 | 3 |
| ITA | Lorenzo Giustino | 153 | 4 |
| ITA | Roberto Marcora | 158 | 5 |
| ITA | Alessandro Giannessi | 160 | 6 |
| AUT | Jurij Rodionov | 166 | 7 |
| SVK | Lukáš Lacko | 172 | 8 |

- ^{1} Rankings are as of 16 March 2020.

=== Other entrants ===
The following players received wildcards into the singles main draw:

- (Italy) Matteo Gigante
- (Italy) Lorenzo Musetti
- (Italy) Giulio Zeppieri

The following player received entry into the singles main draw using a protected ranking:

- (Germany) Maximilian Marterer

The following players received entry from the qualifying draw:

- (Spain) Carlos Alcaraz
- (France) Geoffrey Blancaneaux
- (Italy) Riccardo Bonadio
- (Argentina) Tomás Martín Etcheverry

The following players received entry as lucky losers:

- (Croatia) Viktor Galović
- (Germany) Tobias Kamke

== Champions ==
=== Singles ===
- (Spain) Carlos Alcaraz def. (Italy) Riccardo Bonadio 6–4, 6–3.

=== Doubles ===
- (Uruguay) Ariel Behar / (Kazakhstan) Andrey Golubev def. (France) Hugo Gaston / (France) Tristan Lamasine 6–4, 6–2.
