= 2020 Internazionali di Tennis Città di Trieste – Doubles =

Doubles
- 2020 Internazionali di Tennis Città di Trieste

Final
- Champions: (Uruguay) Ariel Behar (Kazakhstan) Andrey Golubev
- Runners-up: (France) Hugo Gaston (France) Tristan Lamasine
- Score: 6–4, 6–2

Events
Singles	Doubles
Internazionali di Tennis Città di Trieste	· 2021 →

This was the first edition of the tournament.

Ariel Behar and Andrey Golubev won the title after defeating Hugo Gaston and Tristan Lamasine 6–4, 6–2 in the final.

== Seeds ==
1. (Uruguay) Ariel Behar / (Kazakhstan) Andrey Golubev (champions)
2. (Bosnia and Herzegovina) Tomislav Brkić / (Switzerland) Luca Margaroli (quarterfinals)
3. (Poland) Karol Drzewiecki / (Poland) Szymon Walków (first round)
4. (France) Quentin Halys / (France) Antoine Hoang (first round)

== Draw ==
=== Key ===
- Q = Qualifier
- WC = Wild card
- LL = Lucky loser
- Alt = Alternate
- SE = Special exempt
- PR = Protected ranking
- ITF = ITF entry
- JE = Junior exempt
- w/o = Walkover
- r = Retired
- d = Defaulted
- SR = Special ranking

First round
(Italy) L Giustino (Argentina) M Trungelliti	6	6
WC	(Italy) F Maestrelli (Italy) L Nardi	3	4
4	(France) Q Halys (France) A Hoang	7^{7}	2	[8]
(Germany) Y Hanfmann (Germany) M Marterer	6^{5}	6	[10]
WC	(Italy) A Arnaboldi (Italy) Giacomo Dambrosi
(Italy) M Bortolotti (Croatia) V Galović	w/o
(Argentina) A Collarini (Spain) M Vilella Martínez	6	6
(Dominican Republic) R Cid Subervi (Argentina) F Mena	3	4
(Italy) F Cobolli (Italy) M Gigante	6^{6}	6	[10]
3	(Poland) K Drzewiecki (Poland) S Walków	7^{8}	4	[7]
(France) H Gaston (France) T Lamasine	6	6^{8}	[13]
WC	(Italy) L Musetti (Italy) G Zeppieri	3	7^{10}	[11]
(United Kingdom) L Broady (United Kingdom) L Glasspool	6	6^{5}	[9]
2	(Bosnia and Herzegovina) T Brkić (Switzerland) L Margaroli	3	7^{7}	[11]

Quarterfinals
1	(Uruguay) A Behar (Kazakhstan) A Golubev	6	6
(Italy) L Giustino (Argentina) M Trungelliti	2	0
(Germany) Y Hanfmann (Germany) M Marterer	6	7^{7}
(Italy) M Bortolotti (Croatia) V Galović	3	6^{5}
(Argentina) A Collarini (Spain) M Vilella Martínez	4	6	[10]
(Italy) F Cobolli (Italy) M Gigante	6	3	[12]
(France) H Gaston (France) T Lamasine	7^{7}	5	[11]
2	(Bosnia and Herzegovina) T Brkić (Switzerland) L Margaroli	6^{5}	7	[9]

Semifinals
1	(Uruguay) A Behar (Kazakhstan) A Golubev	7	1	[10]
(Germany) Y Hanfmann (Germany) M Marterer	5	6	[6]
(Italy) F Cobolli (Italy) M Gigante	1	3
(France) H Gaston (France) T Lamasine	6	6

Final
1	(Uruguay) A Behar (Kazakhstan) A Golubev	6	6
(France) H Gaston (France) T Lamasine	4	2
