= 2023 Internazionali di Tennis Città di Trieste =

- Date: 17 – 23 July
- Edition: 4th
- Surface: Clay
- Location: Trieste, Italy

Champions

Singles
- (France) Hugo Gaston

Doubles
- (Australia) Matthew Romios / (Australia) Jason Taylor
- Internazionali di Tennis Città di Trieste

The 2023 Internazionali di Tennis Città di Trieste was a professional tennis tournament played on clay courts. It was the 4th edition of the tournament which was part of the 2023 ATP Challenger Tour. It took place in Trieste, Italy between 17 and 23 July 2023.

== Singles main-draw entrants ==
=== Seeds ===
Country	Player	Rank^{1}	Seed
HUN	Fábián Marozsán	96	1
ESP	Pedro Martínez	122	2
CHI	Tomás Barrios Vera	133	3
FRA	Hugo Gaston	137	4
~~CHI~~	~~Alejandro Tabilo~~	~~145~~	~~5~~
ITA	Francesco Passaro	148	6
ITA	Flavio Cobolli	150	7
CZE	Zdeněk Kolář	173	8

- ^{1} Rankings are as of 3 July 2023.

=== Other entrants ===
The following players received wildcards into the singles main draw:

- (Italy) Enrico Dalla Valle
- (Italy) Gabriele Piraino
- (Italy) Marcello Serafini

The following player received entry into the singles main draw as a special exempt:

- (France) Hugo Gaston

The following players received entry into the singles main draw as alternates:

- (France) Mathias Bourgue
- (Chinese Taipei) Tseng Chun-hsin

The following players received entry from the qualifying draw:

- (Germany) Peter Gojowczyk
- (France) Kyrian Jacquet
- (Italy) Stefano Napolitano
- (Spain) Carlos Sánchez Jover
- (Spain) Carlos Taberner
- (France) Clément Tabur

The following players received entry as lucky losers:

- Andrey Chepelev
- (Argentina) Gonzalo Villanueva

== Champions ==
=== Singles ===
- (France) Hugo Gaston def. (Italy) Francesco Passaro 6–3, 5–7, 6–2.

=== Doubles ===
- (Australia) Matthew Romios / (Australia) Jason Taylor def. (Italy) Marco Bortolotti / (Italy) Andrea Pellegrino 4–6, 7–5, [10–6].
