= 2024 Internazionali di Tennis Città di Trieste =

- Date: 8 – 14 July
- Edition: 5th
- Surface: Clay
- Location: Trieste, Italy

Champions

Singles
- (Argentina) Federico Agustín Gómez

Doubles
- (Italy) Marco Bortolotti / (Australia) Matthew Romios
- Internazionali di Tennis Città di Trieste

The 2024 Internazionali di Tennis Città di Trieste was a professional tennis tournament played on clay courts. It was the 5th edition of the tournament which was part of the 2024 ATP Challenger Tour. It took place in Trieste, Italy between 8 and 14 July 2024.

== Singles main-draw entrants ==
=== Seeds ===
Country	Player	Rank^{1}	Seed
FRA	Richard Gasquet	125	1
ITA	Francesco Passaro	132	2
FRA	Titouan Droguet	140	3
ITA	Andrea Pellegrino	158	4
FRA	Benoît Paire	160	5
TPE	Tseng Chun-hsin	161	6
FRA	Ugo Blanchet	162	7
ESP	Oriol Roca Batalla	165	8

- ^{1} Rankings are as of 1 July 2024.

=== Other entrants ===
The following players received wildcards into the singles main draw:

- (Italy) Federico Arnaboldi
- (Italy) Lorenzo Carboni
- (Italy) Marco Cecchinato

The following players received entry into the singles main draw as alternates:

- (Italy) Giovanni Fonio
- (Argentina) Federico Agustín Gómez
- (Italy) Samuel Vincent Ruggeri

The following players received entry from the qualifying draw:

- (Italy) Jacopo Berrettini
- (Italy) Andrea Guerrieri
- Svyatoslav Gulin
- (Spain) Carlos López Montagud
- (Serbia) Dušan Obradović
- (Italy) Alessandro Pecci

== Champions ==
=== Singles ===
- (Argentina) Federico Agustín Gómez def. (Chile) Tomás Barrios Vera 6–1, 6–2.

=== Doubles ===
- (Italy) Marco Bortolotti / (Australia) Matthew Romios def. (Brazil) Daniel Dutra da Silva / (Zimbabwe) Courtney John Lock 6–2, 7–6^{(8–6)}.
