= 2023 Internazionali di Tennis Città di Trieste – Doubles =

Doubles
- 2023 Internazionali di Tennis Città di Trieste

Final
- Champions: (Australia) Matthew Romios (Australia) Jason Taylor
- Runners-up: (Italy) Marco Bortolotti (Italy) Andrea Pellegrino
- Score: 4–6, 7–5, [10–6]

Events
Singles	Doubles
- Internazionali di Tennis Città di Trieste

Diego Hidalgo and Cristian Rodríguez were the defending champions but chose not to defend their title.

Matthew Romios and Jason Taylor won the title after defeating Marco Bortolotti and Andrea Pellegrino 4–6, 7–5, [10–6] in the final.

== Seeds ==
1. (Argentina) Guido Andreozzi / (Pakistan) Aisam-ul-Haq Qureshi (quarterfinals)
2. (Italy) Marco Bortolotti / (Italy) Andrea Pellegrino (final)
3. (Brazil) Fernando Romboli / (Brazil) Marcelo Zormann (first round)
4. (Australia) Matthew Romios / (Australia) Jason Taylor (champions)

== Draw ==
Key

- Q = Qualifier
- WC = Wild card
- LL = Lucky loser
- Alt = Alternate
- ITF = ITF entry
- PR = Protected ranking
- SR = Special ranking
- SE = Special exempt
- JE = Junior exempt
- JR = Junior Accelerator Programme entrant
- CO = College Accelerator Programme entrant
- NG = Next Gen Accelerator Program entrant
- w/o = Walkover
- r = Retired
- d = Defaulted

First round
1	(Argentina) G Andreozzi (Pakistan) A-u-H Qureshi	5	6	[10]
(Romania) A Jecan (Greece) M Kalovelonis	7	3	[4]
(Israel) R Stepanov (United States) Tennyson Whiting	3	6^{5}
(Italy) L Darderi (Italy) A Giannessi	6	7^{7}
4	(Australia) MC Romios (Australia) J Taylor	6	6
(Spain) P Martínez (Spain) C Taberner	3	4
WC	(Italy) Niccolò Ciavarella (Italy) Leonardo Rossi	3	2
(Australia) M Polmans (Australia) A Santillan	6	6
(United States) Jared Thompkins (United States) Jamie Vance	3	3
Alt	Kirill Kivattsev (Argentina) G Villanueva	6	6
(France) K Jacquet (France) C Tabur	7	7^{7}
3	(Brazil) F Romboli (Brazil) M Zormann	5	6^{4}
WC	(Italy) G Piraino (Italy) Marcello Serafini	6	7
Andrey Chepelev; D Golubev	2	5
(United Kingdom) J MacKinlay (Italy) Davide Pozzi	3	5
2	(Italy) M Bortolotti (Italy) A Pellegrino	6	7

Quarterfinals
1	(Argentina) G Andreozzi (Pakistan) A-u-H Qureshi	1	6	[7]
(Italy) L Darderi (Italy) A Giannessi	6	4	[10]
4	(Australia) MC Romios (Australia) J Taylor	6	6
(Australia) M Polmans (Australia) A Santillan	4	4
Alt	K Kivattsev (Argentina) G Villanueva	6^{10}	3
(France) K Jacquet (France) C Tabur	7^{12}	6
WC	(Italy) G Piraino (Italy) M Serafini	6^{4}	2
2	(Italy) M Bortolotti (Italy) A Pellegrino	7^{7}	6

Semifinals
(Italy) L Darderi (Italy) A Giannessi
4	(Australia) MC Romios (Australia) J Taylor	w/o
(France) K Jacquet (France) C Tabur
2	(Italy) M Bortolotti (Italy) A Pellegrino	w/o

Final
4	(Australia) MC Romios (Australia) J Taylor	4	7	[10]
2	(Italy) M Bortolotti (Italy) A Pellegrino	6	5	[6]
