= 2023 Internazionali di Tennis Città di Trieste – Singles =

Singles
- 2023 Internazionali di Tennis Città di Trieste

Final
- Champion: (France) Hugo Gaston
- Runner-up: (Italy) Francesco Passaro
- Score: 6–3, 5–7, 6–2

Events
Singles	Doubles
- Internazionali di Tennis Città di Trieste

Francesco Passaro was the defending champion but lost in the final to Hugo Gaston.

Gaston won the title after defeating Passaro 6–3, 5–7, 6–2 in the final.

== Seeds ==
1. (Hungary) Fábián Marozsán (semifinals)
2. (Spain) Pedro Martínez (semifinals)
3. (Chile) Tomás Barrios Vera (first round)
4. (France) Hugo Gaston (champion)
5. (Chile) Alejandro Tabilo (withdrew)
6. (Italy) Francesco Passaro (final)
7. (Italy) Flavio Cobolli (second round)
8. (Czech Republic) Zdeněk Kolář (second round)

== Draw ==
Key

- Q = Qualifier
- WC = Wild card
- LL = Lucky loser
- Alt = Alternate
- ITF = ITF entry
- PR = Protected ranking
- SR = Special ranking
- SE = Special exempt
- JE = Junior exempt
- JR = Junior Accelerator Programme entrant
- CO = College Accelerator Programme entrant
- NG = Next Gen Accelerator Program entrant
- w/o = Walkover
- r = Retired
- d = Defaulted

=== Finals ===
Semifinals
1	(Hungary) Fábián Marozsán	6	5	2
6	(Italy) Francesco Passaro	3	7	6
4/SE	(France) Hugo Gaston	6	3	6
2	(Spain) Pedro Martínez	3	6	2

Final
6	(Italy) Francesco Passaro	3	7	2
4/SE	(France) Hugo Gaston	6	5	6

=== Top half ===
First round
1	(Hungary) F Marozsán	6	7^{7}
LL	(Argentina) G Villanueva	2	6^{3}
Q	(France) C Tabur	4	7^{7}	3
(Italy) M Gigante	6	6^{5}	6
Alt	(Chinese Taipei) C-h Tseng	6	6^{3}	6^{7}
WC	(Italy) E Dalla Valle	4	7^{7}	7^{9}
(Italy) A Pellegrino	4	5
7	(Italy) F Cobolli	6	7
3	(Chile) T Barrios Vera	5	2
(Argentina) G Andreozzi	7	6
Alt	(France) M Bourgue	4	2
(Bulgaria) A Andreev	6	6
(Croatia) D Prižmić	6	6
(Australia) M Polmans	4	2
(Italy) L Darderi	4	4
6	(Italy) F Passaro	6	6

Second round
1	(Hungary) F Marozsán	7^{7}	3	7
(Italy) M Gigante	6^{4}	6	5
WC	(Italy) E Dalla Valle	7^{7}	6
7	(Italy) F Cobolli	6^{5}	1
(Argentina) G Andreozzi	6	7^{7}
(Bulgaria) A Andreev	3	6^{5}
(Croatia) D Prižmić	6	4	2
6	(Italy) F Passaro	4	6	6

Quarterfinals
1	(Hungary) F Marozsán	6	6
WC	(Italy) E Dalla Valle	1	4
(Argentina) G Andreozzi	6	1	4
6	(Italy) F Passaro	3	6	6

Semifinals
1	(Hungary) F Marozsán	6	5	2
6	(Italy) F Passaro	3	7	6

=== Bottom half ===
First round
Q	(France) K Jacquet	6	7^{11}
Q	(Spain) C Taberner	3	6^{9}
(Austria) L Neumayer	4	6	4
(Ukraine) V Sachko	6	4	6
(Argentina) RA Burruchaga	6	1	6
LL	Andrey Chepelev	2	6	4
(Italy) S Caruso	1	0
4/SE	(France) H Gaston	6	6
8	(Czech Republic) Z Kolář	7^{7}	2	6
WC	(Italy) G Piraino	6^{5}	6	3
Q	(Italy) S Napolitano	6	6
(Italy) A Giannessi	4	2
Q	(Spain) C Sánchez Jover	5	6	6^{3}
WC	(Italy) Marcello Serafini	7	1	7^{7}
Q	(Germany) P Gojowczyk	1	3
2	(Spain) P Martínez	6	6

Second round
Q	(France) K Jacquet	6	6
(Ukraine) V Sachko	3	4
(Argentina) RA Burruchaga	3	6	0
4/SE	(France) H Gaston	6	4	6
8	(Czech Republic) Z Kolář	6	6^{4}	6^{0}
Q	(Italy) S Napolitano	4	7^{7}	7^{7}
WC	(Italy) M Serafini	3	5
2	(Spain) P Martínez	6	7

Quarterfinals
Q	(France) K Jacquet	6	4	4
4/SE	(France) H Gaston	4	6	6
Q	(Italy) S Napolitano	2	4
2	(Spain) P Martínez	6	6

Semifinals
4/SE	(France) H Gaston	6	3	6
2	(Spain) P Martínez	3	6	2
