= 2021 Internazionali di Tennis Città di Trieste =

- Date: 26 July – 1 August
- Edition: 2nd
- Surface: Clay
- Location: Trieste, Italy

Champions

Singles
- (Argentina) Tomás Martín Etcheverry

Doubles
- (Brazil) Orlando Luz / (Brazil) Felipe Meligeni Alves
← 2020 ·	Internazionali di Tennis Città di Trieste	· 2022 →

The 2021 Internazionali di Tennis Città di Trieste was a professional tennis tournament played on clay courts. It was the 2nd edition of the tournament which was part of the 2021 ATP Challenger Tour. It took place in Trieste, Italy between 26 July and 1 August 2021.

== Singles main-draw entrants ==
=== Seeds ===
Country	Player	Rank^{1}	Seed
BIH	Damir Džumhur	127	1
FRA	Antoine Hoang	143	2
ARG	Tomás Martín Etcheverry	166	3
~~SRB~~	~~Danilo Petrović~~	~~173~~	~~4~~
ITA	Alessandro Giannessi	177	5
ARG	Marco Trungelliti	192	6
GER	Maximilian Marterer	196	7
ITA	Thomas Fabbiano	202	8

- ^{1} Rankings are as of 19 July 2021.

=== Other entrants ===
The following players received wildcards into the singles main draw:

- (Italy) Flavio Cobolli
- (Netherlands) Robin Haase
- (Italy) Luca Nardi

The following player received entry into the singles main draw using a protected ranking:

- (Germany) Julian Lenz

The following players received entry from the qualifying draw:

- (Norway) Viktor Durasovic
- (Brazil) Pedro Sakamoto
- (Kazakhstan) Timofey Skatov
- (Argentina) Thiago Agustín Tirante

The following player received entry as a lucky loser:

- (Brazil) Orlando Luz

== Champions ==
=== Singles ===
- (Argentina) Tomás Martín Etcheverry def. (Argentina) Thiago Agustín Tirante 6–1, 6–1.

=== Doubles ===
- (Brazil) Orlando Luz / (Brazil) Felipe Meligeni Alves def. (France) Antoine Hoang / (France) Albano Olivetti 7–5, 6–7^{(6–8)}, [10–5].
