= 2024 Internazionali di Tennis Città di Trieste – Singles =

Singles
- 2024 Internazionali di Tennis Città di Trieste

Final
- Champion: (Argentina) Federico Agustín Gómez
- Runner-up: (Chile) Tomás Barrios Vera
- Score: 6–1, 6–2

Events
Singles	Doubles
- Internazionali di Tennis Città di Trieste

Hugo Gaston was the defending champion but chose not to defend his title.

Federico Agustín Gómez won the title after defeating Tomás Barrios Vera 6–1, 6–2 in the final.

== Seeds ==
1. (France) Richard Gasquet (first round)
2. (Italy) Francesco Passaro (first round)
3. (France) Titouan Droguet (quarterfinals)
4. (Italy) Andrea Pellegrino (first round, retired)
5. (France) Benoît Paire (first round)
6. (Chinese Taipei) Tseng Chun-hsin (first round, retired)
7. (France) Ugo Blanchet (second round)
8. (Spain) Oriol Roca Batalla (semifinals)

== Draw ==
Key

- Q = Qualifier
- WC = Wild card
- LL = Lucky loser
- Alt = Alternate
- ITF = ITF entry
- PR = Protected ranking
- SR = Special ranking
- SE = Special exempt
- JE = Junior exempt
- JR = Junior Accelerator Programme entrant
- CO = College Accelerator Programme entrant
- NG = Next Gen Accelerator Program entrant
- w/o = Walkover
- r = Retired
- d = Defaulted

=== Finals ===
Semifinals
(Chile) Tomás Barrios Vera	6	6
8	(Spain) Oriol Roca Batalla	4	2
(Portugal) Henrique Rocha	3	4
Alt	(Argentina) Federico Agustín Gómez	6	6

Final
(Chile) Tomás Barrios Vera	1	2
Alt	(Argentina) Federico Agustín Gómez	6	6

=== Top half ===
First round
1	(France) R Gasquet	4	2
Alt	(Italy) Samuel Vincent Ruggeri	6	6
(Bulgaria) A Andreev	4
Q	Svyatoslav Gulin	1^{r}
(Chile) T Barrios Vera	6	7
WC	(Italy) F Arnaboldi	2	5
Q	(Italy) J Berrettini	6	3	1
6	(Chinese Taipei) C-h Tseng	4	6	0^{r}
3	(France) T Droguet	6	7
Alt	(Italy) G Fonio	3	5
Q	(Spain) Carlos López Montagud	3	5
(Italy) S Travaglia	6	7
(Peru) G Bueno	6	6
WC	(Italy) Lorenzo Carboni	1	4
(Spain) N Sánchez Izquierdo	3	2
8	(Spain) O Roca Batalla	6	6

Second round
Alt	(Italy) S Vincent Ruggeri	2	6	4
(Bulgaria) A Andreev	6	4	6
(Chile) T Barrios Vera	6	6
Q	(Italy) J Berrettini	3	0
3	(France) T Droguet	6	5	6
(Italy) S Travaglia	3	7	4
(Peru) G Bueno	1	7^{7}	2
8	(Spain) O Roca Batalla	6	6^{5}	6

Quarterfinals
(Bulgaria) A Andreev	2	0^{r}
(Chile) T Barrios Vera	6	1
3	(France) T Droguet	5	4
8	(Spain) O Roca Batalla	7	6

Semifinals
(Chile) T Barrios Vera	6	6
8	(Spain) O Roca Batalla	4	2

=== Bottom half ===
First round
5	(France) B Paire	2	6	6^{4}
Q	(Italy) Alessandro Pecci	6	4	7^{7}
Q	(Italy) A Guerrieri	5	6	3
(Portugal) H Rocha	7	3	6
(Portugal) J Faria	4	2
Q	(Serbia) Dušan Obradović	6	6
(Italy) F Maestrelli	3	7	0
4	(Italy) A Pellegrino	6	5	0^{r}
7	(France) U Blanchet	6	3	6
(Hungary) Z Piros	3	6	1
A Kachmazov	6^{3}	6^{4}
Alt	(Argentina) FA Gómez	7^{7}	7^{7}
WC	(Italy) M Cecchinato	6^{8}	6^{3}
(Lithuania) V Gaubas	7^{10}	7^{7}
(Italy) E Dalla Valle	6	6
2	(Italy) F Passaro	2	3

Second round
Q	(Italy) A Pecci
(Portugal) H Rocha	w/o
Q	(Serbia) D Obradović	7^{7}	1	0
(Italy) F Maestrelli	6^{4}	6	6
7	(France) U Blanchet	4	2
Alt	(Argentina) FA Gómez	6	6
(Lithuania) V Gaubas	6^{5}	2
(Italy) E Dalla Valle	7^{7}	6

Quarterfinals
(Portugal) H Rocha	6	6
(Italy) F Maestrelli	2	1
Alt	(Argentina) FA Gómez	6	6
(Italy) E Dalla Valle	3	4

Semifinals
(Portugal) H Rocha	3	4
Alt	(Argentina) FA Gómez	6	6
