= 2026 Internazionali di Tennis Città di Trieste =

- Date: 6 – 12 July
- Edition: 7th
- Surface: Clay
- Location: Trieste, Italy

Champions

Singles
- (Bolivia) Hugo Dellien

Doubles
- (Croatia) Admir Kalender / (Croatia) Nino Serdarušić
- Internazionali di Tennis Città di Trieste

The 2026 Internazionali di Tennis Città di Trieste was a professional tennis tournament played on clay courts. It was the 7th edition of the tournament which was part of the 2026 ATP Challenger Tour. It took place in Trieste, Italy between 6 and 12 July 2026.

== Singles main-draw entrants ==
=== Seeds ===
Country	Player	Rank^{1}	Seed
ITA	Andrea Pellegrino	133	1
BOL	Hugo Dellien	162	2
AUT	Lukas Neumayer	167	3
AUT	Joel Schwärzler	177	4
ITA	Francesco Passaro	185	5
CRO	Matej Dodig	208	6
ARG	Federico Agustín Gómez	212	7
ESP	Nikolás Sánchez Izquierdo	214	8

- ^{1} Rankings are as of 29 June 2026.

=== Other entrants ===
The following players received wildcards into the singles main draw:

- (Italy) Juan Cruz Martin Manzano
- (Italy) Andrea Pellegrino
- (Italy) Michele Ribecai

The following player received entry into the singles main draw through the College Accelerator programme:

- (Switzerland) Dylan Dietrich

The following player received entry into the singles main draw through the Next Gen Accelerator programme:

- (Czech Republic) Maxim Mrva

The following players received entry into the singles main draw as alternates:

- (Italy) Federico Bondioli
- (Italy) Carlo Alberto Caniato
- (Spain) Oriol Roca Batalla

The following players received entry from the qualifying draw:

- (Switzerland) Henry Bernet
- (Italy) Enrico Dalla Valle
- (Italy) Pietro Fellin
- (Ukraine) Georgii Kravchenko
- (North Macedonia) Oleg Prihodko
- (Argentina) Gonzalo Villanueva

== Champions ==
=== Singles ===
- (Bolivia) Hugo Dellien def. (Croatia) Matej Dodig 5–7, 6–4, 6–2.

=== Doubles ===
- (Croatia) Admir Kalender / (Croatia) Nino Serdarušić def. (Netherlands) Jarno Jans / (United Kingdom) Mark Whitehouse 7–6^{(7–4)}, 6–4.
