= Thiago Agustín Tirante =

Argentine tennis player (born 2001)

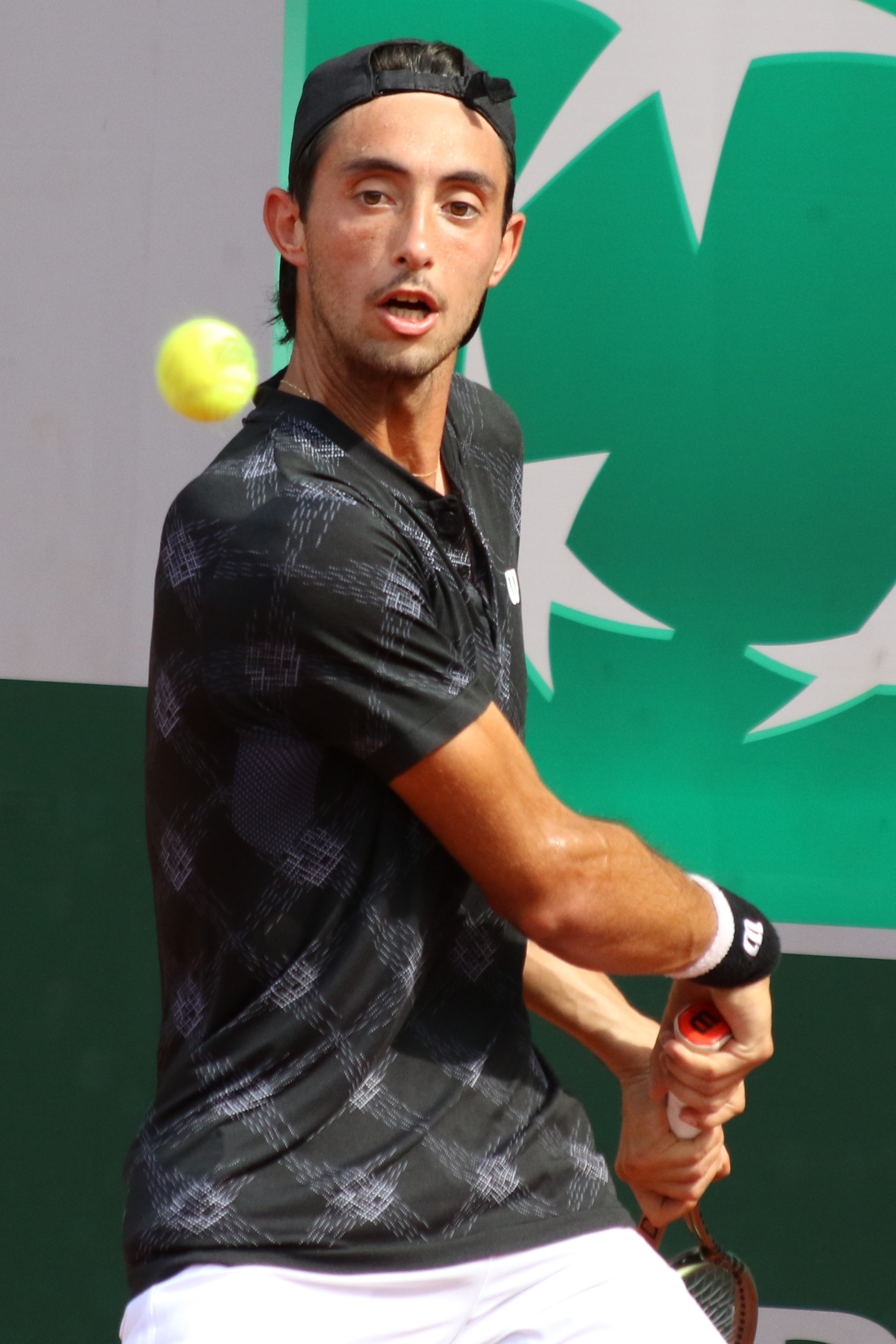
- Tirante at the 2022 French Open
- Country (sports): Argentina
- Born: 10 April 2001 (age 25) La Plata, Argentina
- Height: 1.85 m (6 ft 1 in)
- Turned pro: 2016
- Plays: Right-handed (two-handed backhand)
- Coach: Miguel Pastura (2023–), Javier Nalbandian (Jun 2022–Sep 2024), Dante Gennaro (2024)
- Prize money: US $2,312,952

Singles
- Career record: 29–25
- Career titles: 0
- Highest ranking: No. 42 (24 August 2026)
- Current ranking: No. 51 (9 November 2026)

Grand Slam singles results
- Australian Open: 2R (2026)
- French Open: 3R (2026)
- Wimbledon: 1R (2026)
- US Open: 1R (2026)

Doubles
- Career record: 4–9
- Career titles: 0
- Highest ranking: No. 225 (20 July 2026)
- Current ranking: No. 257 (10 August 2026)

Grand Slam doubles results
- French Open: 2R (2026)
- Wimbledon: 2R (2026)
- Last updated on: 10 August 2026.

Thiago Agustín Tirante (born 10 April 2001) is an Argentine professional tennis player. He has a career-high ATP singles ranking of world No. 42 achieved on 24 August 2026 and a career-high doubles ranking of No. 225 achieved on 20 July 2026.

== Junior career ==
In June 2019, Tirante won the boys' doubles title at the French Open with Brazilian Matheus Pucinelli de Almeida. Later that season, he earned the boys' singles trophy at the prestigious Orange Bowl.

Tirante had good results on the ITF Junior Circuit, maintaining a 130–57 singles win-loss record. He was named the 2019 world junior champion by the ITF and was the second Argentine to finish the season as world No. 1 in the junior rankings, after Axel Geller.

== Professional career ==
=== 2021: ATP debut and maiden ATP Challenger title ===
In March, he made his ATP Tour main draw debut at the 2021 Argentina Open. In September 2021, he won his maiden Challenger title at the 2021 Ambato La Gran Ciudad in Ecuador.

=== 2023–2025: Major and Masters 1000 debuts, first top 10 win and top 100 debut ===
Tirante reached the final of the 2023 Mexico City Open, where he lost to German Dominik Koepfer. In May of that year, he entered the top 150 for the first time, following his second Challenger title at the 2023 Morelos Open, defeating Australian James Duckworth in the final.

Ranked No. 153, he made his slam main draw debut at the 2023 French Open, defeating Swiss Dominic Stricker in the last round of qualifying. Tirante recorded his first Grand Slam win over 25th seed Botic van de Zandschulp. He lost to Zhang Zhizhen in the second round.

In August he played at the 2023 Los Cabos Open, Mexico, and recorded first win at an ATP event over qualifier Gonzalo Lama. He won his third Challenger at the 2023 Open Bogotá over Gustavo Heide and reached a new career-high ranking of No. 111 on 2 October 2023. At the same tournament, he also won the doubles title with countryman Renzo Olivo.

At the 2024 Córdoba Open, Tirante reached the main draw as a lucky loser and recorded his third ATP win over an ATP debutant, wildcard Francisco Comesaña. He played the qualifying at the 2024 Rio Open, but lost to Italian Andrea Pellegrino. Despite the loss, he reached the top 100 on 26 February 2024.

Later that month, Tirante made an appearance at the 2024 Chile Open, where he defeated Brazilian prospect João Fonseca in straight sets. He lost to qualifier Corentin Moutet in the second round.

Tirante won his fourth Challenger at the 2024 Mexico City Open without dropping a set and reached a best singles ranking of world No. 91 on 8 April 2024.

In July, Tirante reached his first ATP Tour semifinal at the 2024 Swedish Open, after a run which included wins over top seed and defending champion, Andrey Rublev, his first top 10 win, and Roberto Carballés Baena in the quarterfinals, before losing to eventual champion Nuno Borges.

Tirante won his first challenger title of 2025 in Córdoba after being granted a late-entry wildcard.

He made his Masters 1000 debut the following week in Miami by qualifying. He also picked up his first win at this level by upsetting Flavio Cobolli, but lost to Denis Shapovalov in the second round. He continued his solid form by reaching the quarterfinals in Morelia, losing to eventual finalist Dmitry Popko.

Tirante reached the quarterfinals in Mauthausen and Oeiras, then reached the semifinals in Poznań, and reached his second challenger final of the year in Trieste, where he lost to Matej Dodig. Combined with semifinal appearances in San Marino and a third challenger final in Cancún, he entered the top 120 in late August.

Tirante won his second Challenger title of the year in Szczecin. This resulted in his debut in the top 100 of the ATP Tour rankings, peaking at world no. 94. Despite this, he ended his year at world no. 102.

=== 2026: Three top 10 wins, Masters 1000 quarterfinal, first ATP Final, top 50 ===
Tirante picked up his first Australian Open win. After reaching the quarterfinals in Manama, Tirante returned to the top 100.

Tirante reached his first ATP 500 quarterfinal at Rio, after 1st seed Francisco Cerúndolo retired in their second round match. He continued his clay-court success by reaching the semifinals at Houston, where he upset top seed and world no. 9 Ben Shelton for his second top 10 win. He continued his clay-court form by reaching the third round at Madrid and the fourth round at Rome, upsetting 18th seed Tommy Paul at Madrid, then 19th seed Cameron Norrie and eventual French Open finalist Flavio Cobolli at Rome. He also reached the third round at a Grand Slam for the first time at the French Open, where he upset Alejandro Davidovich Fokina in the second round. After recording his first ever grass-court win in Eastbourne and making his main-draw debut in Wimbledon, he reached his third quarterfinal of the year in Båstad, but had to withdraw from his match against Alejandro Tabilo.

In Montreal, Tirante reached the fourth round of a Masters 1000 event for the first time in his career, upsetting world no. 8 Taylor Fritz on the way there for his second top 10 win of the season and third top 10 win overall. He also upset former champion Alexei Popyrin, but eventually lost to 19th seed Learner Tien in the fourth round. As a result of this, he reached the world's top 50 for the first time. Tirante then continued his good form in Cincinnati, beating 3rd seed and world no. 5 Novak Djokovic in 3 sets for the biggest win of his career. He then beat Martín Landaluce and 14th seed Jakub Menšík to reach a Masters 1000 quarterfinal for the first time in his career. He lost to 21st seed Arthur Fils in the quarterfinals.

In November, Tirante reached his first ATP Tour-level final at Stockholm, beating Jaume Munar, Alexander Shevchenko and Alejandro Tabilo.

== Coaching ==
Tirante hired Javier Nalbandian to be his coach in June 2022. Dante Gennaro replaced Nalbandian starting in September 2024 and during the 2025 United Cup, where Titante made his debut as the No. 2 Argentine singles player.

== Performance timeline ==
Key
W	F	SF	QF	#R	RR	Q#	DNQ	A	NH

(W) winner; (F) finalist; (SF) semifinalist; (QF) quarterfinalist; (#R) rounds 4, 3, 2, 1; (RR) round-robin stage; (Q#) qualification round; (DNQ) did not qualify; (A) absent; (NH) not held; (SR) strike rate (events won / competed); (W–L) win–loss record.

=== Singles ===
Tournament	2022	2023	2024	2025	2026	SR	W–L	Win %
Grand Slam tournaments
Australian Open	Q2	Q2	Q1	Q3	2R	0 / 0	1–1	50%
French Open	Q2	2R	1R	1R	3R	0 / 4	3–4	33%
Wimbledon	Q2	Q1	Q2	Q1	1R	0 / 1	0–1	0%
US Open	Q1	Q3	Q2	Q2	1R	0 / 1	0–1	0%
Win–loss	0–0	1–1	0–1	0–1	3–4	0 / 7	4–7	36%
ATP Masters 1000
Indian Wells Masters	A	A	A	A	Q2	0 / 0	0–0	–
Miami Open	Q1	A	A	2R	2R	0 / 2	2–2	50%
Monte Carlo Masters	A	A	A	A	A	0 / 0	0–0	–
Madrid Open	A	A	Q2	Q1	3R	0 / 1	2-1	67%
Italian Open	A	A	Q1	Q1	4R	0 / 1	3–1	75%
Canadian Open	A	A	A	A	4R	0 / 1	3–1	75%
Cincinnati Masters	A	A	A	1R	QF	0 / 2	4–2	67%
Shanghai Masters	NH	A	A	A	1R	0 / 1	1–1	50%
Paris Masters	A	A	A	A	2R	0 / 1	0–1	0%
Win–loss	0–0	0–0	0–0	1–2	14–7	0 / 9	15–9	63%

== ATP Tour finals ==
=== Singles: 1 (runner-up) ===
Legend ATP 250 (0–1)	Finals by surface Hard (0–1)	Finals by setting Indoor (0–1)

Result	W–L	Date	Tournament	Tier	Surface	Opponent	Score
Loss	0–1	Nov 2026	Stockholm Open, Sweden	ATP 250	Hard (i)	(United States) Taylor Fritz	2–6, 6–4, 6–7^{(3–7)}

== ATP Challenger Tour finals ==
=== Singles: 13 (6 titles, 7 runner-ups) ===
Legend ATP Challenger Tour (6–7)	Finals by surface Hard (1–2) Clay (5–5)

Result	W–L	Date	Tournament	Tier	Surface	Opponent	Score
Loss	0–1	Nov 2020	Lima Challenger, Peru	Challenger	Clay	(Colombia) Daniel Elahi Galán	1–6, 6–3, 3–6
Loss	0–2	Jul 2021	Internazionali Città di Trieste, Italy	Challenger	Clay	(Argentina) Tomás Martín Etcheverry	1–6, 1–6
Win	1–2	Sep 2021	Ambato La Gran Ciudad, Ecuador	Challenger	Clay	(Peru) Juan Pablo Varillas	7–5, 7–5
Loss	1–3	Aug 2022	Lima Challenger, Peru	Challenger	Clay	(Argentina) Camilo Ugo Carabelli	2–6, 6–7^{(4–7)}
Loss	1–4	Mar 2023	Mexico City Open, Mexico	Challenger	Clay	(Germany) Dominik Koepfer	6–2, 4–6, 2–6
Win	2–4	Apr 2023	Morelos Open, Mexico	Challenger	Hard	(Australia) James Duckworth	7–5, 6–0
Win	3–4	Sep 2023	Open Bogotá, Colombia	Challenger	Clay	(Brazil) Gustavo Heide	walkover
Win	4–4	Apr 2024	Mexico City Open, Mexico	Challenger	Clay	(Canada) Alexis Galarneau	6–1, 6–3
Loss	4–5	Nov 2024	Internacional Masculino de Tênis, Brazil	Challenger	Hard	(Argentina) Francisco Comesaña	5–7, 6–4, 4–6
Win	5–5	Mar 2025	Challenger de Córdoba, Argentina	Challenger	Clay	(Argentina) Juan Pablo Ficovich	6–4, 6–0
Loss	5–6	Jul 2025	Internazionali Città di Trieste, Italy	Challenger	Clay	(Croatia) Matej Dodig	3–6, 4–6
Loss	5–7	Aug 2025	Europcar Cancún Country Open, Mexico	Challenger	Hard	(Czech Republic) Dalibor Svrčina	4–6, 7–5, 4–6
Win	6–7	Sep 2025	Invest In Szczecin Open, Poland	Challenger	Clay	(Spain) Pablo Llamas Ruiz	6–3, 6–2

=== Doubles: 7 (3 titles, 4 runner-ups) ===
Legend ATP Challenger Tour (3–4)	Finals by surface Hard (0–1) Clay (3–3)

Result	W–L	Date	Tournament	Tier	Surface	Partner	Opponents	Score
Loss	0–1	Feb 2020	Punta Open, Uruguay	Challenger	Clay	(Argentina) Juan Manuel Cerúndolo	(Brazil) Orlando Luz (Brazil) Rafael Matos	4–6, 2–6
Loss	0–2	May 2021	Salinas Challenger II, Ecuador	Challenger	Hard	(Ecuador) Antonio Cayetano March	(Colombia) Nicolás Barrientos (Peru) Sergio Galdós	walkover
Win	1–2	Sep 2021	Quito Challenger, Ecuador	Challenger	Clay	(Colombia) Alejandro Gómez	(Spain) Adrián Menéndez Maceiras (Spain) Mario Vilella Martínez	7–5, 6–7^{(5–7)}, [10–8]
Loss	1–3	Sep 2021	Ambato La Gran Ciudad, Ecuador	Challenger	Clay	(Colombia) Alejandro Gómez	(Ecuador) Diego Hidalgo (Colombia) Cristian Rodríguez	3–6, 6–4, [3–10]
Loss	1–4	Jul 2022	Internationaux de Troyes, France	Challenger	Clay	(Argentina) Juan Bautista Torres	(Spain) Íñigo Cervantes (Spain) Oriol Roca Batalla	1–6, 2–6
Win	2–4	Oct 2022	Ambato La Gran Ciudad, Ecuador	Challenger	Clay	(Argentina) Santiago Rodríguez Taverna	(Zimbabwe) Benjamin Lock (Zimbabwe) Courtney John Lock	7–6^{(13–11)}, 6–3
Win	3–4	Sep 2023	Open Bogotá, Colombia	Challenger	Clay	(Argentina) Renzo Olivo	(Brazil) Orlando Luz (Argentina) Guillermo Durán	7–6^{(8–6)}, 6–4

== ITF Tour finals ==
=== Singles: 3 (1 title, 2 runner-ups) ===
Legend ITF WTT (1–2)

Result	W–L	Date	Tournament	Tier	Surface	Opponent	Score
Loss	0–1	Aug 2019	M15 Cancún, Mexico	WTT	Hard	(France) Ronan Joncour	6–3, 5–7, 1–6
Win	1–1	Oct 2020	M15 Monastir, Tunisia	WTT	Hard	(Poland) Wojciech Marek	7–6^{(7–2)}, 6–7^{(4–7)}, 6–3
Loss	1–2	Oct 2020	M15 Monastir, Tunisia	WTT	Hard	(Tunisia) Skander Mansouri	4–6, 6–3, 6–7^{(5–7)}

=== Doubles: 3 (1 title, 2 runner-ups) ===
Legend ITF WTT (1–2)

Result	W–L	Date	Tournament	Tier	Surface	Partner	Opponents	Score
Win	1–0	Aug 2019	M15 Cancún, Mexico	WTT	Hard	(Japan) Shintaro Mochizuki	(United Kingdom) Isaac Stoute (Australia) Brandon Walkin	6–7^{(4–7)}, 7–5, [10–4]
Loss	1–1	Sep 2020	M15 Monastir, Tunisia	WTT	Clay	(Argentina) Matías Franco Descotte	(Greece) Aristotelis Thanos (Greece) Petros Tsitsipas	3–6, 4–6
Loss	1–2	Oct 2020	M15 Monastir, Tunisia	WTT	Hard	(Mexico) Luis Patiño	(Germany) Maik Steiner (Germany) Patrick Zahraj	6–4, 4–6, [8–10]

== Junior Grand Slam finals ==
=== Doubles: 1 (title) ===
Result	Year	Tournament	Surface	Partner	Opponents	Score
Win	2019	French Open	Clay	(Brazil) Matheus Pucinelli de Almeida	(Italy) Flavio Cobolli (Switzerland) Dominic Stricker	7–6^{(7–3)}, 6–4

== Wins over top 10 players ==
- Tirante's has a 4–1 (80.0%) record against players who were, at the time the match was played, ranked in the top 10.

Season	2024	2025	2026	Total
Wins	1	0	3	4

No.	Player	Rk	Tournament	Surface	Rd	Score	Rk
2024
1.	Andrey Rublev	8	Swedish Open, Sweden	Clay	2R	7–6^{(7–5)}, 3–6, 6–4	121
2026
2.	(United States) Ben Shelton	9	U.S. Men's Clay Court Championships, US	Clay	QF	6–7^{(5–7)}, 6–3, 6–4	83
3.	(United States) Taylor Fritz	8	Canadian Open, Canada	Hard	2R	7–5, 6–3	65
4.	(Serbia) Novak Djokovic	5	Cincinnati Open, United States	Hard	2R	2–6, 6–4, 6–4	65

*As of 15 August 2026

== Awards ==
2019

- ITF Junior World Champion

Awards and achievements
Preceded by (Chinese Taipei) Tseng Chun-hsin	ITF Junior World Champion; 2019	Succeeded by (China) Shang Juncheng
