= Admir Kalender =

Croatian tennis player

- Country (sports): Croatia
- Born: 12 January 2001 (age 25) Pula, Croatia
- Height: 1.93 m (6 ft 4 in)
- Plays: Right-handed
- Prize money: US $60,665

Singles
- Career record: 0–0 (at ATP Tour level, Grand Slam level, and in Davis Cup)
- Career titles: 0
- Highest ranking: No. 966 (28 August 2023)

Doubles
- Career record: 3–2 (at ATP Tour level, Grand Slam level, and in Davis Cup)
- Career titles: 0
- Highest ranking: No. 114 (19 October 2026)
- Current ranking: No. 114 (19 October 2026)
- Last updated on: 19 October 2026.

Admir Kalender (born 12 January 2001) is a Croatian tennis player. Kalender has a career-high ATP singles ranking of world No. 966 achieved on 28 August 2023 and a doubles ranking of No. 114 achieved on 19 October 2026.

Kalender made his ATP main draw debut at the 2021 Croatia Open Umag after receiving a wildcard into the doubles main draw.

== ITF World Tennis Tour finals ==
=== Singles: 1 (1 runner-up) ===
Legend ITF WTT (0–1)

Result	W–L	Date	Tournament	Tier	Surface	Opponent	Score
Loss	0–1	Aug 2022	M15 Celje, Slovenia	WTT	Clay	(Croatia) Roko Horvat	3–6, 6–3, 1–6

=== Doubles: 24 (15 titles, 9 runner-ups) ===
Legend ATP Challenger Tour (5–2) ITF WTT (10–7)	Finals by surface Hard (0–3) Clay (15–6)

Result	W–L	Date	Tournament	Tier	Surface	Partner	Opponents	Score
Loss	0–1	Aug 2021	M15 Bad Waltersdorf, Austria	WTT	Clay	(Austria) Lukas Krainer	(Austria) Lukas Neumayer (Austria) Neil Oberleitner	7–5, 3–6, [7–10]
Loss	0–2	Mar 2022	M15 Antalya, Turkey	WTT	Clay	(Turkey) Sarp Ağabigün	(United Kingdom) Felix Gill (Argentina) Román Andrés Burruchaga	4–6, 3–6
Win	1–2	Jul 2022	M15 Metzingen, Germany	WTT	Clay	(Croatia) Antonio Šančić	(Slovakia) Lukáš Pokorný (United States) Alfredo Perez	7–6^{(7–5)}, 6–3
Win	2–2	Jul 2024	M15 Kuršumlijska Banja, Serbia	WTT	Clay	Pavel Verbin	(Serbia) Vuk Rađenović (Greece) Aristotelis Thanos	6–4, 6–4
Loss	2–3	Aug 2024	M15 Kuršumlijska Banja, Serbia	WTT	Clay	Pavel Verbin	Kirill Mishkin; Vitali Shvets	4–6, 6–3, [8–10]
Win	3–3	Aug 2024	M15 Pirot, Serbia	WTT	Clay	(Serbia) Vuk Rađenović	(Serbia) Stefan Latinović (Morocco) Younes Lalami Laaroussi	7–5, 0–6, [10–8]
Loss	3–4	Nov 2024	M25 Monastir, Tunisia	WTT	Hard	(Turkey) Yankı Erel	Marat Sharipov (Slovakia) Lukáš Pokorný	walkover
Loss	3–5	Nov 2024	M15 Monastir, Tunisia	WTT	Hard	(Croatia) Nikola Bašić	(Czech Republic) Matyáš Černý (Czech Republic) Jonáš Kučera	2–6, 6–2, [9–11]
Loss	3–6	Feb 2025	M25 Trento, Italy	WTT	Hard (i)	(Croatia) Nino Serdarušić	(Czech Republic) Jan Jermář (France) Dan Added	4–6, 4–6
Win	4–6	May 2025	M25 Bol, Croatia	WTT	Clay	Pavel Verbin	(Croatia) Matej Dodig (Croatia) Nino Serdarušić	3–6, 6–4, [10–6]
Win	5–6	Jul 2025	M15 Nova Gorica, Slovenia	WTT	Clay	(Croatia) Nino Serdarušić	(Netherlands) Stijn Pel (United States) Oren Vasser	6–1, 6–4
Win	6–6	Aug 2025	M15 Kuršumlijska Banja, Serbia	WTT	Clay	Pavel Verbin	(Serbia) Zoran Ludoški (Serbia) Novak Novaković	6–3, 6–4
Win	7–6	Aug 2025	M25 Maribor, Slovenia	WTT	Clay	Pavel Verbin	(Serbia) Marko Maksimović (Serbia) Dušan Obradović	6–4, 7–5
Win	8–6	Feb 2026	M15 Antalya, Turkey	WTT	Clay	(Serbia) Stefan Popović	(Romania) Daniel Uță (Iran) Ali Yazdani	6–3, 6–4
Win	9–6	Feb 2026	M15 Antalya, Turkey	WTT	Clay	(Serbia) Stefan Popović	(Italy) Gabriele Maria Noce (Italy) Noah Perfetti	6–2, 3–6, [10–8]
Win	10–6	Apr 2026	Shymkent, Kazakhstan	Challenger	Clay	(Croatia) Mili Poljičak	(Norway) Viktor Durasovic (Germany) Kai Wehnelt	6–2, 6–7^{(7–9)}, [10–5]
Loss	10–7	May 2026	M25 Bol, Croatia	World Tennis Tour	Clay	(Serbia) Matej Sabanov	(Australia) Thomas Fancutt (New Zealand) Ajeet Rai	6–7^{(3–7)}, 3–6
Win	11–7	May 2026	M25 Bol, Croatia	World Tennis Tour	Clay	(Croatia) Mili Poljičak	(Greece) Dimitris Sakellaridis (Greece) Michalis Sakellaridis	6–4, 6–3
Win	12–7	Jul 2026	Trieste, Italy	Challenger	Clay	(Croatia) Nino Serdarušić	(Netherlands) Jarno Jans (United Kingdom) Mark Whitehouse	7–6^{(7–4)}, 6–4
Win	13–7	Aug 2026	Hagen, Germany	Challenger	Clay	(Croatia) Nino Serdarušić	(United Kingdom) Finn Bass (Netherlands) Jarno Jans	6–4, 3–6, [13–11]
Win	14–7	Aug 2026	Hamburg, Germany	Challenger	Clay	(Croatia) Nino Serdarušić	(Germany) Niels McDonald (Germany) Jannik Opitz	6–3, 6–4
Win	15–7	Aug 2026	Como, Italy	Challenger	Clay	(Croatia) Nino Serdarušić	(Poland) Karol Drzewiecki (Poland) Piotr Matuszewski	6–3, 6–4
Loss	15–8	Sep 2026	Genoa, Italy	Challenger	Clay	(Croatia) Nino Serdarušić	(Serbia) Stefan Latinović (Croatia) Mili Poljičak	6–7^{(1–7)}, 7–6^{(7–3)}, [6–10]
Loss	15–9	Oct 2026	Braga, Portugal	Challenger	Clay	(Poland) Karol Drzewiecki	(Morocco) Younes Lalami (Spain) Mario Mansilla Díez	3–6, 6–2, [14–16]
