= Matej Dodig =

Croatian tennis player (born 2005)

- Dodig at the 2026 Wimbledon Championships
- Country (sports): Croatia
- Born: 19 July 2005 (age 21) Osijek, Croatia
- Height: 1.88 m (6 ft 2 in)
- Plays: Right-handed (two-handed backhand)
- Coach: Velimir Zovko, Duje Delic, Kruno Zrinski
- Prize money: US $466,100

Singles
- Career record: 2–6 (at ATP Tour level, Grand Slam level, and in Davis Cup)
- Career titles: 0
- Highest ranking: No. 136 (9 November 2026)
- Current ranking: No. 141 (16 November 2026)

Grand Slam singles results
- Australian Open: Q1 (2026)
- French Open: Q2 (2026)
- Wimbledon: Q2 (2026)

Doubles
- Career record: 0–1 (at ATP Tour level, Grand Slam level, and in Davis Cup)
- Career titles: 0
- Highest ranking: No. 356 (21 July 2025)
- Current ranking: No. 556 (9 November 2026)
- Last updated on: 16 November 2026.

Matej Dodig (born 19 July 2005) is a Croatian tennis player. He has a career-high ATP singles ranking of world No. 136 achieved on 9 November 2026 and a doubles ranking of No. 356 achieved on 21 July 2025. He is currently the No. 4 player from Croatia.

== Personal life ==
He is not directly related to fellow Croatian tennis player Ivan Dodig.

== Career ==
=== 2023: Professional debut, first ITF title ===
In March 2023, a week after making his professional debut, Dodig won his first title at the $15k event in Rovinj without dropping a set.

=== 2024: ATP Tour debut and first win, top 300 ===
Dodig made his ATP Tour debut after receiving a wildcard for the main draw of his home tournament, the Croatia Open Umag, and recorded his first ATP win over qualifier Enzo Couacaud.

=== 2025: First Challenger title, top 250 ===
Dodig won his first singles Challenger title in Trieste as a qualifier, not dropping a set en route. As a result, he reached a new career-high ranking of world No. 246 on 14 July 2025, rising more than 120 positions up in the singles rankings. He was granted a wildcard in the main draw of the 2025 Croatia Open Umag – Singles, but lost in the first round to Francesco Passaro, 6–4, 1–6, 2–6.

In the span of May–June 2025, he won two challenger doubles titles with fellow Croat Nino Serdarušić at the Zagreb Open and the Royan Atlantique Open.

== Performance timeline ==
Key
W	F	SF	QF	#R	RR	Q#	DNQ	A	NH

(W) winner; (F) finalist; (SF) semifinalist; (QF) quarterfinalist; (#R) rounds 4, 3, 2, 1; (RR) round-robin stage; (Q#) qualification round; (DNQ) did not qualify; (A) absent; (NH) not held; (SR) strike rate (events won / competed); (W–L) win–loss record.
To avoid confusion and double counting, these charts are updated at the conclusion of a tournament or when the player's participation has ended.

=== Singles ===
Tournament	2026	SR	W–L	Win %
Grand Slam tournaments
Australian Open	Q1	0 / 0	0–0	–
French Open		0 / 0	0–0	–
Wimbledon		0 / 0	0–0	–
US Open		0 / 0	0–0	–
Win–loss	0–0	0 / 0	0–0	–
ATP Masters 1000
Indian Wells Masters		0 / 0	0–0	–
Miami Open		0 / 0	0–0	–
Monte Carlo Masters		0 / 0	0–0	–
Madrid Open		0 / 0	0-0	–
Italian Open		0 / 0	0–0	–
Canadian Open		0 / 0	0–0	–
Cincinnati Masters		0 / 0	0–0	–
Shanghai Masters		0 / 0	0–0	–
Paris Masters		0 / 0	0–0	–
Win–loss	0–0	0 / 0	0–0	–

== ATP Challenger Tour finals ==
=== Singles: 4 (3 titles, 1 runner-up) ===
Legend ATP Challenger Tour (3–1)

Result	W–L	Date	Tournament	Tier	Surface	Opponent	Score
Win	1–0	Jul 2025	Internazionali Città di Trieste, Italy	Challenger	Clay	(Argentina) Thiago Agustín Tirante	6–3, 6–4
Loss	1–1	Jul 2026	Internazionali Città di Trieste, Italy	Challenger	Clay	(Bolivia) Hugo Dellien	7–5, 4–6, 2–6
Win	2–1	Aug 2026	Como Lake Challenger, Italy	Challenger	Clay	(Peru) Juan Pablo Varillas	6–3, 7–6^{(7–5)}
Win	3–1	Oct 2026	Braga Open, Portugal	Challenger	Clay	(Denmark) Elmer Møller	3–6, 6–3, 6–2

=== Doubles: 2 (2 titles) ===
Legend ATP Challenger Tour (2–0)

Result	W–L	Date	Tournament	Tier	Surface	Partner	Opponents	Score
Win	1–0	May 2025	Zagreb Open, Croatia	Challenger	Clay	(Croatia) Nino Serdarušić	(Croatia) Luka Mikrut (Croatia) Mili Poljičak	6–4, 6–4
Win	2–0	Jun 2025	Royan Open, France	Challenger	Clay	(Croatia) Nino Serdarušić	(India) Adil Kalyanpur (India) Parikshit Somani	7–5, 6–7^{(4–7)}, [12–10]

== ITF World Tennis Tour finals ==
=== Singles: 6 (5 titles, 1 runner-ups) ===
Legend ITF WTT (5–1)	Finals by surface Hard (1–1) Clay (4–0)

Result	W–L	Date	Tournament	Tier	Surface	Opponent	Score
Win	1–0	Mar 2023	M15 Rovinj, Croatia	WTT	Clay	(Italy) Federico Arnaboldi	6–0, 6–2
Win	2–0	Aug 2023	M15 Novi Sad, Serbia	WTT	Clay	(Serbia) Stefan Popović	4–6, 6–2, 6–3
Win	3–0	Aug 2023	M15 Kottingbrunn, Austria	WTT	Clay	Marat Sharipov	6–4, 7–5
Loss	3–1	Feb 2024	M15 Monastir, Tunisia	WTT	Hard	(United States) Ulises Blanch	6–0, 3–6, 4–6
Win	4–1	Feb 2024	M15 Monastir, Tunisia	WTT	Hard	(Italy) Federico Cinà	3–6, 6–3, 6–0
Win	5–1	Mar 2024	M15 Rovinj, Croatia	WTT	Clay	(United Kingdom) Jay Clarke	7–6^{(7–4)}, 6–4

=== Doubles: 4 (1 title, 3 runner-ups) ===
Legend ITF WTT (1–3)

Result	W–L	Date	Tournament	Tier	Surface	Partner	Opponents	Score
Win	1–0	Aug 2023	M25 Osijek, Croatia	WTT	Clay	(Croatia) Luka Mikrut	(Croatia) Marino Jakić (Serbia) Stefan Milićević	6–1, 6–2
Loss	1–1	Oct 2023	M25 Pazardzhik, Bulgaria	WTT	Clay	(Ukraine) Eric Vanshelboim	(Bulgaria) Simon Anthony Ivanov (Bulgaria) Gabriel Donev	2–6, 1–6
Loss	1–2	Nov 2023	M25 Monastir, Tunisia	WTT	Hard	(Germany) Sebastian Prechtel	(Italy) Giorgio Ricca (Switzerland) Rémy Bertola	3–6, 0–6
Loss	1–3	May 2025	M25 Bol, Croatia	WTT	Clay	(Croatia) Nino Serdarušić	(Croatia) Admir Kalender; Pavel Verbin	6–3, 4–6, [6–10]
