= Matthew Romios =

Australian tennis player

- Full name: Matthew Christopher Romios
- Country (sports): Australia
- Born: 29 March 1999 (age 27) Melbourne, Australia
- Height: 1.83 m (6 ft 0 in)
- Plays: Right-Handed, Two-Handed Backhand
- Prize money: $ 285,336

Singles
- Career record: 0–0 (at ATP Tour level, Grand Slam level, and in Davis Cup)
- Career titles: 0
- Highest ranking: No. 563 (23 September 2019)

Doubles
- Career record: 10–22 (at ATP Tour level, Grand Slam level, and in Davis Cup)
- Career titles: 13 Challengers, 9 ITF
- Highest ranking: No. 69 (30 June 2025)
- Current ranking: No. 81 (23 February 2026)

Grand Slam doubles results
- Australian Open: 2R (2025)
- French Open: 1R (2025)
- Wimbledon: 2R (2025)
- US Open: 1R (2025)

Grand Slam mixed doubles results
- Australian Open: 2R (2026)
- Last updated on: 27 February 2026.

Matthew Christopher Romios (born 29 March 1999) is an Australian tennis player who specializes in doubles. He has a career high ATP doubles ranking of world No. 69 achieved on 30 June 2025 and career high singles ranking of No. 563 achieved on 23 September 2019. Romios has won 10 ATP Challenger Tour titles.

== Career ==
Romios made his ATP main draw debut at the 2022 Sydney International after receiving a wildcard into the doubles main draw with Moerani Bouzige.

== ATP Tour finals ==
=== Doubles: 1 (runner-up) ===
Legend Grand Slam (–) ATP 1000 (–) ATP 500 (–) ATP 250 (0–1)	Finals by surface Hard (–) Clay (0–1) Grass (–)	Finals by setting Outdoor (0–1) Indoor (–)

Result	W–L	Date	Tournament	Tier	Surface	Partner	Opponents	Score
Loss	0–1	Feb 2026	Chile Open, Chile	ATP 250	Clay	(Uruguay) Ariel Behar	(Brazil) Orlando Luz (Brazil) Rafael Matos	4–6, 3–6

== ATP Challenger and ITF Tour finals ==
=== Singles: 1 (0–1) ===
Legend
ATP Challengers (0–0)
ITF Futures (0–1)

Result	W–L	Date	Tournament	Tier	Surface	Opponent	Score
Loss	0–1	Feb 2019	M25 Albury, Australia	World Tennis Tour	Grass	(United Kingdom) Brydan Klein	1–6, 2–6

=== Doubles: 41 (22–19) ===
Legend
ATP Challengers (13–7)
ITF Futures (9–12)

Result	W–L	Date	Tournament	Tier	Surface	Partner	Opponents	Score
Win	1–0	Mar 2018	F3 Mornington, Australia	Futures	Clay	(Chinese Taipei) Yu Hsiou Hsu	(Australia) Tom Evans / (Australia) Max Purcell	6–3, 6–3
Win	2–0	Jul 2018	Indonesia F1, Jakarta	Futures	Hard	(Australia) Michael Look	(Indonesia) Justin Barki / (Indonesia) Christopher Rungkat	7–6^{(8–6)}, 7–6^{(7–5)}
Win	3–0	May 2019	M15 Cancun, Mexico	World Tennis Tour	Hard	(Australia) Brandon Walkin	(United States) Alexios Halebian / (United States) Paul Osterbaan	6–2, 2–6, [8–10]
Loss	3–1	Sep 2019	M25 Darwin, Australia	World Tennis Tour	Hard	(Australia) Thomas Fancutt	(United Kingdom) Brydan Klein / (Australia) Dayne Kelly	5–7, 5–7
Loss	3–2	Jul 2021	M15 Esch-sur-Alzette, Luxembourg	World Tennis Tour	Clay	(Netherlands) Mick Veldheer	(Italy) Davide Pozzi / (Italy) Alexander Weis	1–6, 6–4, [8–10]
Loss	3–3	Sep 2021	M15 Ulcinj, Montenegro	World Tennis Tour	Clay	(Australia) William Ma	(Italy) Marcello Serafini / (Italy) Samuel Vincent Ruggeri	3–6, 2–6
Win	4–3	Oct 2021	M15 Heraklion, Greece	World Tennis Tour	Hard	(Sweden) Markus Eriksson	(Hungary) Peter Vajta / (Hungary) Zsombor Velcz	3–6, 7–6^{(7–5)}, [10–0]
Win	5–3	Nov 2021	M15 Heraklion, Greece	World Tennis Tour	Hard	(Germany) Kai Lemstra	(Sweden) Filip Bergevi / (Germany) Kai Wehnelt	4–6, 6–3, [12–10]
Loss	5–4	Mar 2022	M25, Canberra, Australia	World Tennis Tour	Clay	(Ukraine) Eric Vanshelboim	(Australia) Dane Sweeny / (Australia) Li Tu	6–7^{(7–5)}, 6–3, [7–10]
Loss	5–5	Mar 2022	M25, Canberra, Australia	World Tennis Tour	Clay	(Ukraine) Eric Vanshelboim	(Australia) Adam Taylor / (Australia) Jason Taylor	6–7^{(8–6)}, 6–3, [12–14]
Loss	5–6	May 2022	M15, Antalya, Turkey	World Tennis Tour	Clay	(Australia) Brandon Walkin	Vladimir Korolev / Maxim Ratniuk	6–7^{(3–7)}, 6–4, [5–10]
Win	6–6	Jun 2022	M25, Kiseljak, Bosnia and Herzegovina	World Tennis Tour	Clay	(Australia) Brandon Walkin	(Italy) Mattia Bellucci / (Switzerland) Rémy Bertola	6–3, 4–6, [10–6]
Loss	6–7	Jun 2022	M15, Bytom, Poland	World Tennis Tour	Clay	(Australia) Brandon Walkin	(Czech Republic) Jakub Menšík / (Poland) Olaf Pieczkowski	6–7^{(3–7)}, 5–7
Loss	6–8	Jul 2022	M15, Caloundra, Australia	World Tennis Tour	Hard	(Australia) Aaron Addison	(Australia) Jeremy Beale / (Australia) Thomas Fancutt	6–7^{(1–7)}, 3–6
Win	7–8	Jul 2022	M15, Caloundra, Australia	World Tennis Tour	Hard	(Australia) Aaron Addison	(Australia) Blake Bayldon / (Australia) Jordan Smith	6–4, 3–6, [10–5]
Loss	7–9	Nov 2022	M25, Traralgon, Australia	World Tennis Tour	Hard	(Australia) Calum Puttergill	(Australia) James Frawley / (Australia) Jeremy Beale	3–6, 2–6
Loss	7–10	Mar 2023	M25 Swan Hill, Australia	World Tennis Tour	Hard	(Australia) Blake Ellis	(Australia) Tristan Schoolkate / (Australia) Luke Saville	3–6, 4–6
Loss	7–11	Mar 2023	M25 Canberra, Australia	World Tennis Tour	Clay	(Australia) Brandon Walkin	(Japan) Taisei Ichikawa / (Japan) Daisuke Sumizawa	6–7^{(6–8)}, 7–5, [3–10]
Win	8–11	Apr 2023	M25 Jakarta, Indonesia	World Tennis Tour	Hard	(Australia) Brandon Walkin	(Chinese Taipei) Ray Ho / (India) Parikshit Somani	7–5, 6–4
Win	9–11	Jun 2023	M25 Kiseljak, Bosnia & Herzegovina	World Tennis Tour	Clay	(Australia) Brandon Walkin	(Serbia) Stefan Latinović / (Serbia) Andrej Radojicic	6–2, 6–3
Loss	9–12	Jun 2023	M15 Sarajevo, Bosnia & Herzegovina	World Tennis Tour	Clay	(Australia) Brandon Walkin	(Argentina) Juan Bautista Otegui / (Argentina) Matias Zukas	6–7^{(0–7)}, 3–6
Win	10–12	Jul 2023	Trieste, Italy	Challenger	Clay	(Australia) Jason Taylor	(Italy) Marco Bortolotti / (Italy) Andrea Pellegrino	4–6, 7–5, [10–6]
Win	11–12	Aug 2023	Zhangjiagang, China	Challenger	Hard	(Chinese Taipei) Ray Ho	(Philippines) Francis Alcantara / (China) Sun Fajing	6–3, 6–4
Loss	11–13	Sep 2023	Guangzhou, China	Challenger	Hard	(Chinese Taipei) Ray Ho	(Switzerland) Antoine Bellier / (Switzerland) Luca Castelnuovo	3–6, 6–7 ^{(5–7)}
Loss	11–14	Oct 2023	Shenzhen, China	Challenger	Hard	(Poland) Piotr Matuszewski	(Austria) Alexander Erler / (Austria) Lucas Miedler	3–6, 4–6
Win	12–14	Mar 2024	New Delhi, India	Challenger	Hard	(Poland) Piotr Matuszewski	(Germany) Jakob Schnaitter / (Germany) Mark Wallner	6–4, 6–4
Loss	12–15	Apr 2024	Cuernavaca, Mexico	Challenger	Hard	(Poland) Piotr Matuszewski	(India) Arjun Kadhe / (India) Jeevan Nedunchezhiyan	6–7^{(5–7)}, 4–6
Win	13–15	Jun 2024	Sassuolo, Italy	Challenger	Clay	(Italy) Marco Bortolotti	(United States) Ryan Seggerman / (United States) Patrik Trhac	7–6^{(9–7)}, 2–6, [11–9]
Win	14–15	Jul 2024	Trieste, Italy	Challenger	Clay	(Italy) Marco Bortolotti	(Brazil) Daniel Dutra da Silva / (Zimbabwe) Courtney John Lock	6–2, 7–6^{(8–6)}
Win	15–15	Aug 2024	Cordenons, Italy	Challenger	Clay	(Italy) Marco Bortolotti	(Czech Republic) Jiří Barnat / (Czech Republic) Andrew Paulson	w/o
Win	16–15	Sep 2024	Shanghai, China	Challenger	Hard	(Colombia) Cristian Rodríguez	(India) Rithvik Choudary Bollipalli / (India) Arjun Kadhe	7–6^{(7–4)}, 1–6, [10–7]
Win	17–15	Jan 2025	Brisbane, Australia	Challenger	Hard	(Northern Mariana Islands) Colin Sinclair	(Australia) Joshua Charlton / (Australia) Patrick Harper	7–6^{(7–2)}, 7–5
Loss	17–16	Feb 2025	Pune, India	Challenger	Hard	(Australia) Blake Bayldon	(India) Jeevan Nedunchezhiyan / (India) N Vijay Sundar Prashanth	6–3, 3–6, [0–10]
Loss	17–17	Feb 2025	Bengaluru, India	Challenger	Hard	(Australia) Blake Bayldon	(India) Anirudh Chandrasekar / (Chinese Taipei) Ray Ho	2–6, 4–6
Loss	17–18	Apr 2025	Busan, South Korea	Challenger	Hard	(Chinese Taipei) Ray Ho	(Japan) Rio Noguchi / (Japan) Yuta Shimizu	6–7^{(7–9)}, 4–6
Win	18–18	Apr 2025	Gwangju, South Korea	Challenger	Hard	(Chinese Taipei) Ray Ho	(United States) Vasil Kirkov / (Netherlands) Bart Stevens	6–3, 7–6^{(8–6)}
Win	19–18	Apr 2025	Guangzhou, China	Challenger	Hard	(Chinese Taipei) Ray Ho	(United States) Vasil Kirkov / (Netherlands) Bart Stevens	6–3, 6–4
Loss	19–19	May 2025	Wuxi, China	Challenger	Hard	(Chinese Taipei) Ray Ho	(United States) Vasil Kirkov / (Netherlands) Bart Stevens	6–3, 5–7, [6–10]
Win	20–19	Jun 2025	Sassuolo, Italy	Challenger	Clay	(United States) Ryan Seggerman	(Austria) Alexander Erler / (Germany) Constantin Frantzen	7–6^{(7–4)}, 3–6, [10–7]
Win	21–19	Jun 2025	Milan, Italy	Challenger	Clay	(United States) Ryan Seggerman	(United States) George Goldhoff / (Chinese Taipei) Ray Ho	3–6, 7–5, [10–8]
Win	22–19	Sep 2025	Guangzhou, China	Challenger	Hard	(United States) Ryan Seggerman	(Japan) Seita Watanabe / (Japan) Kaito Uesugi	6–1, 6–3
