= Riccardo Bonadio =

Italian tennis player

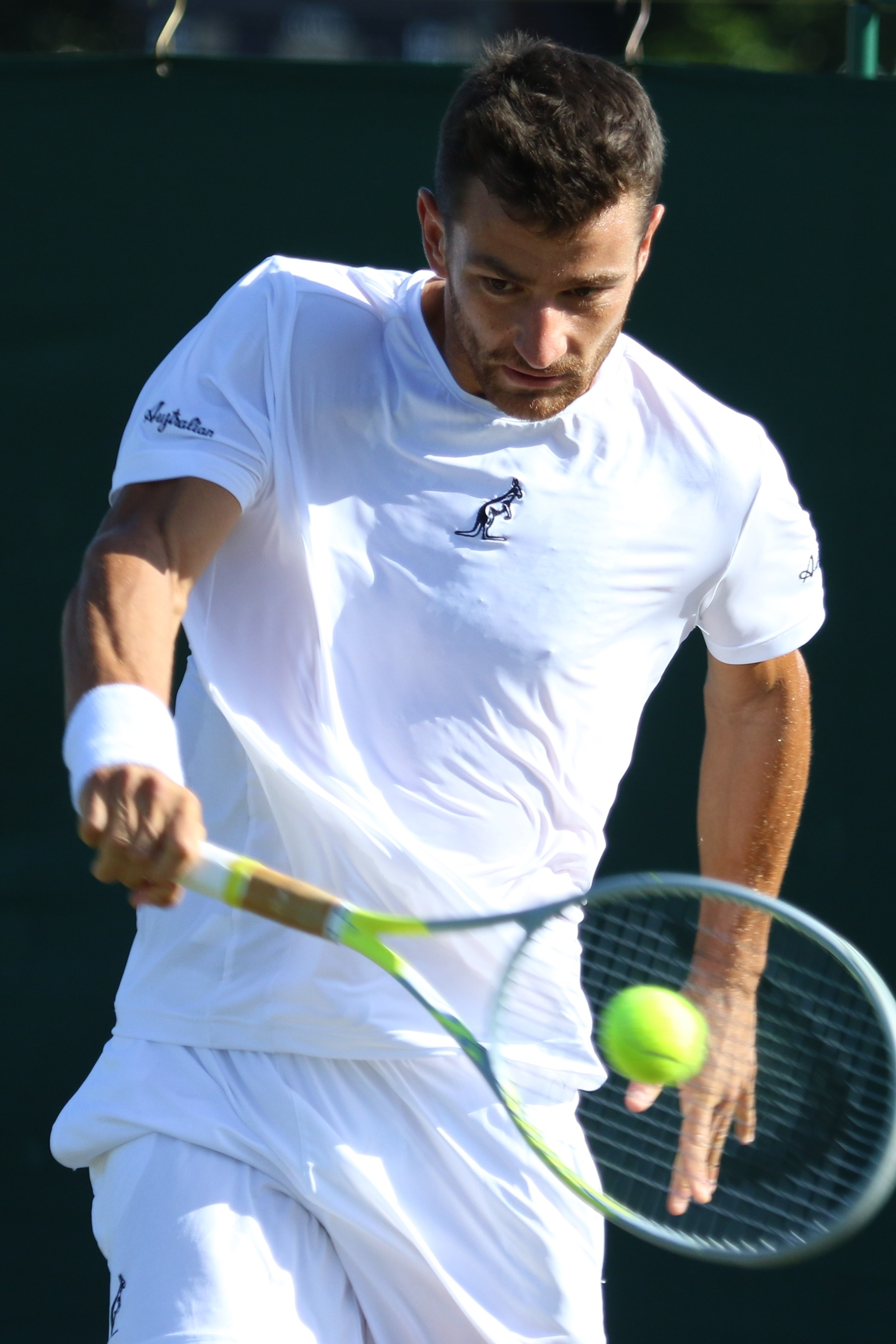
- Bonadio at the 2022 Wimbledon Championships
- Country (sports): Italy
- Residence: Azzano Decimo, Italy
- Born: 13 July 1993 (age 33) San Vito al Tagliamento, Italy
- Height: 1.80 m (5 ft 11 in)
- Retired: August 2024
- Plays: Right-handed (one-handed backhand)
- Coach: Mattia Livraghi, Uros Vico, Marco Cassiani
- Prize money: US $502,185

Singles
- Career record: 1–2
- Career titles: 0
- Highest ranking: No. 164 (22 May 2023)

Grand Slam singles results
- Australian Open: Q2 (2024)
- French Open: Q2 (2023)
- Wimbledon: Q2 (2022)
- US Open: Q3 (2022)

Doubles
- Career record: 0–0
- Career titles: 0
- Highest ranking: No. 278 (21 March 2022)

Riccardo Bonadio (born 13 July 1993) is an Italian former professional tennis player. He has a career high ATP singles ranking of world No. 164 achieved on 22 May 2023 and a career high doubles ranking of world No. 278 achieved on 21 March 2022.

== Career ==
Bonadio won the ATP Challenger doubles title at the 2021 Antalya Challenger III with Giovanni Fonio.

Bonadio made his ATP debut at the 2023 Chile Open in Santiago after qualifying for the main draw. He recorded his first ATP win defeating Daniel Elahi Galán.

He also qualified for the 2023 Grand Prix Hassan II but lost to Christopher O'Connell in the first round.

In August 2024, Bonadio retired from professional tennis, with his final tournament being at the 2024 Internazionali di Tennis del Friuli Venezia Giulia, where he lost to Carlos Taberner in the quarterfinals.

== Challenger and Futures/World Tennis Tour Finals ==
=== Singles: 20 (10–10) ===
Legend (singles) ATP Challenger Tour (0–2) ITF Futures/World Tennis Tour (10–8)	Titles by surface Hard (1–2) Clay (9–8) Grass (0–0) Carpet (0–0)

Result	W–L	Date	Tournament	Tier	Surface	Opponent	Score
Win	1–0	Jul 2015	Romania F9, Curtea de Argeș	Futures	Clay	(Romania) Petru-Alexandru Luncanu	6–3, 4–6, 6–4
Loss	1–1	Aug 2015	Egypt F24, Sharm El Sheikh	Futures	Hard	(Italy) Alessandro Bega	2–6, 5–7
Win	2–1	Aug 2016	Egypt F20, Sharm El Sheikh	Futures	Hard	(Czech Republic) Tomas Papik	6–7^{(2–7)}, 7–5, 6–3
Loss	2–2	Oct 2016	Italy F31, Santa Margherita di Pula	Futures	Clay	(Italy) Walter Trusendi	3–6, 1–6
Win	3–2	May 2017	Ukraine F2, Cherkassy	Futures	Clay	(Spain) Carlos Boluda-Purkiss	6–3, 6–1
Win	4–2	Jul 2017	Italy F22, Gubbio	Futures	Clay	(Italy) Pietro Rondoni	6–3, 7–6^{(7–2)}
Loss	4–3	Nov 2017	Turkey F42, Antalya	Futures	Clay	(Brazil) Thiago Seyboth Wild	4–6, 4–6
Loss	4–4	Nov 2017	Turkey F43, Antalya	Futures	Clay	(France) Laurent Rochette	6–7^{(3–7)}, 0–1 ret.
Loss	4–5	Sep 2018	Turkey F28, Antalya	Futures	Clay	(France) Matthieu Perchicot	2–6, 6–1, 6–7^{(8–10)}
Win	5–5	Sep 2018	Turkey F29, Antalya	Futures	Clay	(Russia) Kirill Kivattsev	6–1, 6–2
Win	6–5	Oct 2018	Turkey F32, Antalya	Futures	Clay	(Italy) Dante Gennaro	6–2, 7–6^{(7–4)}
Loss	6–6	Oct 2018	Turkey F33, Antalya	Futures	Clay	(Spain) Jordi Samper Montaña	6–0, 3–6, 4–6
Win	7–6	Nov 2018	Italy F33, Santa Margherita di Pula	Futures	Clay	(Brazil) Jordan Correia	6–2, 7–5
Win	8–6	Dec 2018	Egypt F30, Cairo	Futures	Clay	(Czech Republic) Vit Kopriva	6–2, 6–0
Win	9–6	Feb 2020	M15 Antalya, Turkey	World Tennis Tour	Clay	(Argentina) Juan Pablo Paz	3–6, 6–4, 6–1
Loss	9–7	Mar 2020	M15 Vale do Lobo, Portugal	World Tennis Tour	Hard	(Spain) Ricardo Ojeda Lara	6–1, 3–6, 4–6
Loss	9–8	Aug 2020	Trieste, Italy	Challenger	Clay	(Spain) Carlos Alcaraz	4–6, 3–6
Win	10–8	Feb 2022	M25 Antalya, Turkey	World Tennis Tour	Clay	(Uruguay) Martín Cuevas	6–3, 3–6, 7–5
Loss	10–9	Mar 2022	M25 Opatija, Croatia	World Tennis Tour	Hard	(Hungary) Máté Valkusz	6–4, 4–6, 2–6
Loss	10–10	Jun 2022	Bratislava, Slovakia	Challenger	Clay	Alexander Shevchenko	3–6, 5–7

=== Doubles ===
Result	Date	Tournament	Tier	Surface	Partner	Opponents	Score
Winner	5 December 2021	Antalya, Turkey	Challenger	Clay	(Italy) Giovanni Fonio	(Chinese Taipei) Hsu Yu-hsiou (Chinese Taipei) Tseng Chun-hsin	3–6, 6–2, [12–10]
