= Federico Agustín Gómez =

Argentine tennis player (born 1996)

- Gómez at the 2026 Wimbledon Championships
- Country (sports): Argentina
- Born: 26 November 1996 (age 29) Merlo, Argentina
- Height: 1.91 m (6 ft 3 in)
- Turned pro: 2014
- Plays: Right-handed (two-handed backhand)
- College: University of Louisville
- Prize money: US $771,859

Singles
- Career record: 3–7
- Career titles: 0
- Highest ranking: No. 133 (3 February 2025)
- Current ranking: No. 169 (31 August 2026)

Grand Slam singles results
- Australian Open: Q1 (2025)
- French Open: 2R (2025)
- Wimbledon: Q2 (2025)
- US Open: 1R (2025)

Doubles
- Career record: 6–2
- Career titles: 0
- Highest ranking: No. 117 (5 May 2025)
- Current ranking: No. 216 (31 August 2026)
- Last updated on: 1 September 2026.

Federico Agustín Gómez (born 26 November 1996) is an Argentine professional tennis player. He has a career-high ATP singles ranking of No. 133 achieved on 3 February 2025 and a best doubles ranking of No. 117, reached on 5 May 2025.

Gómez played college tennis at the University of Louisville.

== Career ==
Gómez won his maiden ATP Challenger doubles title at the 2023 Tallahassee Tennis Challenger with Nicolás Kicker.

Ranked No. 367, he made his ATP main draw debut at the 2024 Córdoba Open as a qualifier, having entered the qualifying competition as an alternate. At the same tournament, he also made his debut as wildcard pair partnering Renzo Olivo and won his first ATP doubles match.

Gómez won his first singles ATP Challenger title in Milan becoming the oldest first-time winner for 2024.

He qualified for the main draw and recorded his first ATP win at the 2024 Chengdu Open over Alexandre Müller.

Ranked No. 140, Gómez made his Grand Slam main draw debut at the 2025 French Open as a lucky loser and recorded his first major win over Aleksandar Kovacevic.

== Performance timeline ==
Key
W	F	SF	QF	#R	RR	Q#	DNQ	A	NH

(W) winner; (F) finalist; (SF) semifinalist; (QF) quarterfinalist; (#R) rounds 4, 3, 2, 1; (RR) round-robin stage; (Q#) qualification round; (DNQ) did not qualify; (A) absent; (NH) not held; (SR) strike rate (events won / competed); (W–L) win–loss record.
To avoid confusion and double counting, these charts are updated at the conclusion of a tournament or when the player's participation has ended.

=== Singles ===
Current through the 2025

Tournament	2024	2025	SR	W–L	Win %
Grand Slam tournaments
Australian Open	A	Q1	0 / 0	0–0	–
French Open	A	2R	0 / 1	1–1	50%
Wimbledon	A	Q1	0 / 0	0–0	–
US Open	Q2	1R	0 / 1	0–1	0%
Win–loss	0–0	1–2	0 / 2	1–2	33%
ATP Masters 1000
Indian Wells Masters	A	Q1	0 / 0	0–0	–
Miami Open	A	Q1	0 / 0	0–0	–
Monte Carlo Masters	A	A	0 / 0	0–0	–
Madrid Open	A	Q1	0 / 0	0-0	–
Italian Open	A	A	0 / 0	0–0	–
Canadian Open	A	A	0 / 0	0–0	–
Cincinnati Masters	A	A	0 / 0	0–0	–
Shanghai Masters	A	A	0 / 0	0–0	–
Paris Masters	A	A	0 / 0	0–0	–
Win–loss	0–0	0–0	0 / 0	0–0	–

== ATP Tour finals ==
=== Doubles: 1 (runner-up) ===
Legend Grand Slam (–) ATP 1000 (–) ATP 500 (–) ATP 250 (0–1)	Finals by surface Hard (–) Clay (0–1) Grass (–)	Finals by setting Outdoor (0–1) Indoor (–)

Result	W–L	Date	Tournament	Tier	Surface	Partner	Opponents	Score
Loss	0–1	Apr 2025	U.S. Men's Clay Court Championships, US	ATP 250	Clay	(Mexico) Santiago González	(Brazil) Fernando Romboli (Australia) John-Patrick Smith	1–6, 4–6

== ATP Challenger Tour finals ==
=== Singles: 5 (4 titles, 1 runner-up) ===
Legend ATP Challenger Tour (4–1)	Finals by surface Hard (1–1) Clay (3–0)

Result	W–L	Date	Tournament	Tier	Surface	Opponent	Score
Win	1–0	Jun 2024	Aspria Tennis Cup, Italy	Challenger	Clay	(Romania) Filip Cristian Jianu	6–3, 6–4
Win	2–0	Jul 2024	Internazionali Città di Trieste, Italy	Challenger	Clay	(Chile) Tomás Barrios Vera	6–1, 6–2
Win	3–0	Oct 2024	Challenger de Guayaquil, Ecuador	Challenger	Clay	(Chile) Tomás Barrios Vera	6–1, 6–4
Win	4–0	Nov 2025	Challenger de Temuco, Chile	Challenger	Hard	(Argentina) Lautaro Midón	6–4, 6–1
Loss	4–1	Feb 2026	Chennai Open Challenger, India	Challenger	Hard	(Portugal) Frederico Ferreira Silva	4–6, 7–6^{(12–10)}, 4–6.

=== Doubles: 12 (8 titles, 4 runner-ups) ===
Legend ATP Challenger Tour (8–4)	Finals by surface Hard (2–1) Clay (6–3)

Result	W–L	Date	Tournament	Tier	Surface	Partner	Opponents	Score
Win	1–0	Apr 2023	Tallahassee Challenger, US	Challenger	Clay (green)	(Argentina) Nicolás Kicker	(United States) William Blumberg (Venezuela) Luis David Martínez	7–6^{(7–2)}, 4–6, [13–11]
Loss	1–1	Apr 2023	Savannah Challenger, US	Challenger	Clay (green)	(Argentina) Nicolás Kicker	(United States) William Blumberg (Venezuela) Luis David Martínez	1–6, 4–6
Win	2–1	Jan 2024	Punta Open, Uruguay	Challenger	Clay	(Bolivia) Murkel Dellien	(Argentina) Guido Andreozzi (Argentina) Guillermo Durán	6–3, 6–2
Win	3–1	May 2024	Tunis Open, Tunisia	Challenger	Clay	(United Kingdom) Marcus Willis	(Czech Republic) Patrik Rikl (Czech Republic) Michael Vrbenský	4–6, 6–1, [10–6]
Loss	3–2	Aug 2024	Cary Tennis Classic, US	Challenger	Hard	(Greece) Petros Tsitsipas	(Australia) John Peers (Australia) John-Patrick Smith	walkover
Win	4–2	Nov 2024	Internacional Masculino de Tênis, Brazil	Challenger	Hard	(Venezuela) Luis David Martínez	(United States) Christian Harrison (United States) Evan King	7–6^{(7–4)}, 7–5
Loss	4–3	Apr 2025	Sarasota Open, US	Challenger	Clay (green)	(Venezuela) Luis David Martínez	(United States) Robert Cash (United States) J.J. Tracy	4–6, 6–7^{(3–7)}
Win	5–3	Apr 2025	Savannah Challenger, US	Challenger	Clay (green)	(Venezuela) Luis David Martínez	(United States) Mac Kiger (United States) Patrick Maloney	3–6, 6–3, [10–5]
Win	6–3	Jun 2025	Modena Challenger, Italy	Challenger	Clay	(Venezuela) Luis David Martínez	(Denmark) Johannes Ingildsen (Slovakia) Miloš Karol	7–5, 7–6^{(7–5)}
Win	7–3	Oct 2025	Cali Open, Colombia	Challenger	Clay	(Venezuela) Luis David Martínez	(Argentina) Guido Iván Justo (Uruguay) Franco Roncadelli	6–4, 6–4
Loss	7–4	Oct 2025	Los Inkas Open, Peru	Challenger	Clay	(Venezuela) Luis David Martínez	(Ecuador) Gonzalo Escobar (Mexico) Miguel Ángel Reyes-Varela	4–6, 4–6
Win	8–4	Mar 2026	Morelos Open, Mexico	Challenger	Hard	(Ecuador) Andrés Andrade	(India) Rithvik Choudary Bollipalli (India) Arjun Kadhe	6–3, 7–6^{(7–4)}

== ITF World Tennis Tour finals ==
=== Singles: 3 (2 titles, 1 runner-up) ===
Legend ITF WTT (2–1)

Result	W–L	Date	Tournament	Tier	Surface	Opponent	Score
Loss	0–1	Oct 2022	M15 Forbach, France	WTT	Carpet (i)	(Germany) Max Hans Rehberg	4–6, 2–6
Win	1–1	Mar 2023	M15 Naples, US	WTT	Clay	(Argentina) Matías Franco Descotte	6–4, 6–0
Win	2–1	May 2024	M25 Carnac, France	WTT	Clay	(France) Maxime Chazal	6–4, 6–0

=== Doubles: 11 (6 titles, 5 runner-ups) ===
Legend ITF WTT (6–5)	Finals by surface Hard (0–3) Clay (6–2)

Result	W–L	Date	Tournament	Tier	Surface	Partner	Opponents	Score
Win	1–0	Nov 2021	M15 Cundinamarca, Colombia	WTT	Clay	(Colombia) Juan Sebastián Osorio	(Chile) Daniel Antonio Núñez (Chile) Sebastián Santibáñez	7–6^{(7–5)}, 7–6^{(9–7)}
Loss	1–1	Dec 2021	M25 Río Cuarto, Argentina	WTT	Clay	(Argentina) Alejo Vilaro	(Argentina) Franco Emanuel Egea (Argentina) Gabriel Alejandro Hidalgo	6–2, 3–6, [7–10]
Loss	1–2	Apr 2022	M15 Monastir, Tunisia	WTT	Hard	Kirill Kivattsev	(France) Martin Breysach (France) Arthur Bouquier	2–6, 3–6
Loss	1–3	Oct 2022	M25 Nevers, France	WTT	Hard (i)	(United Kingdom) Marcus Willis	(France) Sascha Gueymard Wayenburg (France) Antoine Hoang	7–6^{(12–10)}, 6–7^{(5–7)}, [7–10]
Loss	1–4	Nov 2022	M15 Santa Cruz de la Sierra, Bolivia	WTT	Clay	(Peru) Gonzalo Bueno	(Argentina) Ignacio Monzón (Peru) Conner Huertas del Pino	5–7, 7–6^{(7–4)}, [10–12]
Win	2–4	Mar 2023	M15 Naples, US	WTT	Clay	(Argentina) Ignacio Monzón	(Peru) Gonzalo Bueno (Ecuador) Álvaro Guillén Meza	6–3, 6–2
Win	3–4	May 2023	M25 Carnac, France	WTT	Clay	(France) Maxence Brovillé	(France) Matteo Martineau (France) Clément Tabur	7–6^{(7–5)}, 6–2
Win	4–4	Jun 2023	M25 Kursumlijska Banja, Serbia	WTT	Clay	(Argentina) Leonardo Aboian	(Italy) Samuel Vincent Ruggeri (Ukraine) Volodymyr Uzhylovskyi	6–4, 7–5
Win	5–4	Jun 2023	M15 Belgrade, Serbia	WTT	Clay	(Argentina) Leonardo Aboian	(France) Loris Pourroy (Norway) Andreja Petrovic	7–6^{(7–5)}, 7–6^{(7–1)}
Loss	5–5	Jul 2023	M15 Sofia, Bulgaria	WTT	Hard	(Argentina) Leonardo Aboian	(Sweden) Erik Grevelius (Sweden) Adam Heinonen	1–6, 6–4, [7–10]
Win	6–5	May 2024	M25 Carnac, France	WTT	Clay	(Paraguay) Daniel Vallejo	(Germany) Christoph Negritu (Peru) Alexander Merino	6–3, 7–5
