= Internazionali di Tennis Città di Trieste =

- 2025 Internazionali di Tennis Città di Trieste

ATP Challenger Tour
- Event name: Internazionali di Tennis Città di Trieste
- Location: Trieste, Italy
- Venue: Tennis Club Triestino
- Category: ATP Challenger Tour (2026-), Challenger 100 (2022-2025)
- Surface: Clay
- Prize money: €145,250

The Internazionali di Tennis Città di Trieste is a professional tennis tournament played on clay courts. It is currently part of the ATP Challenger Tour. It is held annually in Trieste, Italy since 2020.

== Past finals ==
=== Singles ===
Year	Champion	Runner-up	Score
2026	(Bolivia) Hugo Dellien	(Croatia) Matej Dodig	5–7, 6–4, 6–2
2025	(Croatia) Matej Dodig	(Argentina) Thiago Agustín Tirante	6–3, 6–4
2024	(Argentina) Federico Agustín Gómez	(Chile) Tomás Barrios Vera	6–1, 6–2
2023	(France) Hugo Gaston	(Italy) Francesco Passaro	6–3, 5–7, 6–2
2022	(Italy) Francesco Passaro	(China) Zhang Zhizhen	4–6, 6–3, 6–3
2021	(Argentina) Tomás Martín Etcheverry	(Argentina) Thiago Agustín Tirante	6–1, 6–1
2020	(Spain) Carlos Alcaraz	(Italy) Riccardo Bonadio	6–4, 6–3

=== Doubles ===
Year	Champions	Runners-up	Score
2026	(Croatia) Admir Kalender (Croatia) Nino Serdarušić	(Netherlands) Jarno Jans (United Kingdom) Mark Whitehouse	7–6^{(7–4)}, 6–4
2025	(Switzerland) Jakub Paul (Czech Republic) Matěj Vocel	(Netherlands) Robin Haase (Denmark) Johannes Ingildsen	7–5, 6–1
2024	(Italy) Marco Bortolotti (Australia) Matthew Romios	(Brazil) Daniel Dutra da Silva (Zimbabwe) Courtney John Lock	6–2, 7–6^{(8–6)}
2023	(Australia) Matthew Romios (Australia) Jason Taylor	(Italy) Marco Bortolotti (Italy) Andrea Pellegrino	4–6, 7–5, [10–6]
2022	(Ecuador) Diego Hidalgo (Colombia) Cristian Rodríguez	(Italy) Marco Bortolotti (Spain) Sergio Martos Gornés	4–6, 6–3, [10–5]
2021	(Brazil) Orlando Luz (Brazil) Felipe Meligeni Alves	(France) Antoine Hoang (France) Albano Olivetti	7–5, 6–7^{(6–8)}, [10–5]
2020	(Uruguay) Ariel Behar (Kazakhstan) Andrey Golubev	(France) Hugo Gaston (France) Tristan Lamasine	6–4, 6–2
