= 2023 Internazionali di Tennis del Friuli Venezia Giulia – Men's doubles =

Men's doubles
- 2023 Internazionali di Tennis del Friuli Venezia Giulia

Final
- Champions: (Italy) Giovanni Fonio (Italy) Francesco Forti
- Runners-up: (India) Niki Kaliyanda Poonacha (Australia) Adam Taylor
- Score: 5–7, 6–1, [10–7]

Events
Singles	men	women
Doubles	men	women
← 2022 ·	Internazionali di Tennis del Friuli Venezia Giulia	· 2024 →

Dustin Brown and Andrea Vavassori were the defending champions but chose not to defend their title.

Giovanni Fonio and Francesco Forti won the title after defeating Niki Kaliyanda Poonacha and Adam Taylor 5–7, 6–1, [10–7] in the final.

== Seeds ==
1. (France) Théo Arribagé / (France) Luca Sanchez (semifinals)
2. (India) Rithvik Choudary Bollipalli / (India) Arjun Kadhe (first round)
3. (Poland) Piotr Matuszewski / (Australia) Matthew Romios (quarterfinals)
4. (Italy) Marco Bortolotti / (Italy) Julian Ocleppo (first round)

== Draw ==
=== Key ===
- Q = Qualifier
- WC = Wild card
- LL = Lucky loser
- Alt = Alternate
- SE = Special exempt
- PR = Protected ranking
- ITF = ITF entry
- JE = Junior exempt
- w/o = Walkover
- r = Retired
- d = Defaulted
- SR = Special ranking

First round
1	(France) T Arribagé (France) L Sanchez	6	3	[10]
(Croatia) Z Babić (Bulgaria) A Donski	2	6	[7]
(France) M Chazal (France) M Martineau	4	6	[10]
(Italy) E Dalla Valle (Chinese Taipei) C-h Tseng	6	2	[6]
4	(Italy) M Bortolotti (Italy) J Ocleppo	6	6^{4}	[5]
(Spain) Á López San Martín (Spain) C Sánchez Jover	3	7^{7}	[10]
(India) N Kaliyanda Poonacha (Australia) A Taylor	2	7^{8}	[11]
(Argentina) RA Burruchaga (Argentina) H Casanova	6	6^{6}	[9]
WC	(Italy) F Arnaboldi (Italy) G Ferrari	4	6	[7]
(Italy) G Fonio (Italy) F Forti	6	3	[10]
WC	(Italy) A Arnaboldi (Italy) R Bonadio	6	4	[2]
3	(Poland) P Matuszewski (Australia) MC Romios	2	6	[10]
(Peru) A Merino (Germany) C Negritu	2	4
(Romania) A Jecan (Italy) Samuel Vincent Ruggeri	6	6
(Argentina) FA Gómez (United Kingdom) M Willis	3	6	[10]
2	(India) RC Bollipalli (India) A Kadhe	6	4	[5]

Quarterfinals
1	(France) T Arribagé (France) L Sanchez	6	1	[15]
(France) M Chazal (France) M Martineau	1	6	[13]
(Spain) Á López San Martín (Spain) C Sánchez Jover	3	4
(India) N Kaliyanda Poonacha (Australia) A Taylor	6	6
(Italy) G Fonio (Italy) F Forti	6	2	[11]
3	(Poland) P Matuszewski (Australia) MC Romios	4	6	[9]
(Romania) A Jecan (Italy) S Vincent Ruggeri	6	3	[8]
(Argentina) FA Gómez (United Kingdom) M Willis	2	6	[10]

Semifinals
1	(France) T Arribagé (France) L Sanchez	4	4
(India) N Kaliyanda Poonacha (Australia) A Taylor	6	6
(Italy) G Fonio (Italy) F Forti	3	6	[10]
(Argentina) FA Gómez (United Kingdom) M Willis	6	2	[8]

Final
(India) N Kaliyanda Poonacha (Australia) A Taylor	7	1	[7]
(Italy) G Fonio (Italy) F Forti	5	6	[10]
