= 2024 Internazionali di Tennis del Friuli Venezia Giulia – Men's doubles =

Men's doubles
- 2024 Internazionali di Tennis del Friuli Venezia Giulia

Final
- Champions: (Italy) Marco Bortolotti (Australia) Matthew Romios
- Runners-up: (Czech Republic) Jiří Barnat (Czech Republic) Andrew Paulson
- Score: Walkover

Events
Singles	men	women
Doubles	men	women
← 2023 ·	Internazionali di Tennis del Friuli Venezia Giulia	· 2025 →

Giovanni Fonio and Francesco Forti were the defending champions but chose not to defend their title.

Marco Bortolotti and Matthew Romios won the title after Jiří Barnat and Andrew Paulson withdrew before the final.

== Seeds ==
1. (Romania) Victor Vlad Cornea / (France) Jonathan Eysseric (quarterfinals)
2. (Italy) Marco Bortolotti / (Australia) Matthew Romios (champions)
3. (India) Arjun Kadhe / (India) Ramkumar Ramanathan (semifinals)
4. (United Kingdom) David Stevenson / (United Kingdom) Marcus Willis (quarterfinals, retired)

== Draw ==
=== Key ===
- Q = Qualifier
- WC = Wild card
- LL = Lucky loser
- Alt = Alternate
- SE = Special exempt
- PR = Protected ranking
- ITF = ITF entry
- JE = Junior exempt
- w/o = Walkover
- r = Retired
- d = Defaulted
- SR = Special ranking

=== Draw ===
First round
1	(Romania) V Cornea (France) J Eysseric	7^{7}	6
WC	(Italy) Peter Buldorini (Italy) Alessandro Pecci	6^{2}	4
(Croatia) L Mikrut (Italy) Augusto Virgili	6^{2}	3
(Czech Republic) Jiří Barnat (Czech Republic) A Paulson	7^{7}	6
4	(United Kingdom) D Stevenson (United Kingdom) M Willis	6	6
WC	(Bosnia and Herzegovina) N Fatić (Croatia) N Serdarušić	3	4
(Romania) A Jecan (New Zealand) R Statham	4	6^{3}
(Israel) D Cukierman (Austria) N Oberleitner	6	7^{7}
(Italy) Andrea Picchione (Italy) Giorgi Ricca	6	6
(Uruguay) I Carou (Argentina) G Villanueva	0	4
(Spain) Í Cervantes (Spain) D Rincón	6^{4}	1
3	(India) A Kadhe (India) R Ramanathan	7^{7}	6
(Brazil) L Britto (Israel) R Stepanov	7^{7}	7
(India) S Banthia (Zimbabwe) CJ Lock	6^{5}	5
I Liutarevich (Poland) S Walków	6^{5}	6^{4}
2	(Italy) M Bortolotti (Australia) MC Romios	7^{7}	7^{7}

Quarterfinals
1	(Romania) V Cornea (France) J Eysseric	4	3
(Czech Republic) J Barnat (Czech Republic) A Paulson	6	6
4	(United Kingdom) D Stevenson (United Kingdom) M Willis	4	1^{r}
(Israel) D Cukierman (Austria) N Oberleitner	6	2
(Italy) A Picchione (Italy) G Ricca	4	3
3	(India) A Kadhe (India) R Ramanathan	6	6
(Brazil) L Britto (Israel) R Stepanov	5	3
2	(Italy) M Bortolotti (Australia) MC Romios	7	6

Semifinals
(Czech Republic) J Barnat (Czech Republic) A Paulson	7^{7}	4	[17]
(Israel) D Cukierman (Austria) N Oberleitner	6^{3}	6	[15]
3	(India) A Kadhe (India) R Ramanathan	6^{2}	4
2	(Italy) M Bortolotti (Australia) MC Romios	7^{7}	6

Final
(Czech Republic) J Barnat (Czech Republic) A Paulson
2	(Italy) M Bortolotti (Australia) MC Romios	w/o
