= 2023 Internazionali di Tennis del Friuli Venezia Giulia =

- Date: 31 July – 6 August (women); 7–13 August (men)
- Edition: 20th (men); 8th (women)
- Category: ATP Challenger Tour; ITF Women's World Tennis Tour
- Surface: Clay / Outdoor
- Location: Cordenons, Italy

Champions

Men's singles
- (Italy) Matteo Gigante

Women's singles
- (Slovenia) Veronika Erjavec

Men's doubles
- (Italy) Giovanni Fonio / (Italy) Francesco Forti

Women's doubles
- (Italy) Angelica Moratelli / (Italy) Camilla Rosatello
← 2022 ·	Internazionali di Tennis del Friuli Venezia Giulia	· 2024 →

The 2023 Serena Wines 1881 Tennis Cup Internazionali di Tennis del Friuli Venezia Giulia was a professional tennis tournament played on outdoor clay courts. It was the 20th edition of the tournament which was part of the 2023 ATP Challenger Tour, and the 8th edition of the tournament which was part of the 2023 ITF Women's World Tennis Tour. It took place in Cordenons, Italy between 31 July and 13 August 2023.

== Champions ==
=== Men's singles ===
- (Italy) Matteo Gigante def. (Austria) Lukas Neumayer 6–0, 6–2.

=== Men's doubles ===
- (Italy) Giovanni Fonio / (Italy) Francesco Forti def. (India) Niki Kaliyanda Poonacha / (Australia) Adam Taylor 5–7, 6–1, [10–7].

=== Women's singles ===
- (Slovenia) Veronika Erjavec def. (Romania) Alexandra Ignatik, 6–3, 6–4

=== Women's doubles ===
- (Italy) Angelica Moratelli / (Italy) Camilla Rosatello def. (Netherlands) Isabelle Haverlag / (Netherlands) Eva Vedder, 0–6, 6–2 [10–5].

== Men's singles main-draw entrants ==
=== Seeds ===
Country	Player	Rank^{1}	Seed
AUT	Dennis Novak	166	1
ITA	Francesco Passaro	169	2
ITA	Riccardo Bonadio	195	3
ITA	Matteo Gigante	197	4
ROU	Nicholas David Ionel	203	5
ARG	Andrea Collarini	215	6
ITA	Edoardo Lavagno	232	7
ARG	Román Andrés Burruchaga	239	8

- ^{1} Rankings are as of 31 July 2023.

=== Other entrants ===
The following players received wildcards into the singles main draw:

- (Italy) Federico Arnaboldi
- (Italy) Enrico Dalla Valle
- (Italy) Gianmarco Ferrari

The following player received entry into the singles main draw using a protected ranking:

- (Slovenia) Blaž Rola

The following player received entry into the singles main draw as an alternate:

- (Ukraine) Vladyslav Orlov

The following players received entry from the qualifying draw:

- (Argentina) Federico Agustín Gómez
- (Italy) Federico Iannaccone
- (Argentina) Juan Bautista Otegui
- (Italy) Lorenzo Rottoli
- (Italy) Fausto Tabacco
- (Argentina) Gonzalo Villanueva

== Women's singles main-draw entrants ==
=== Seeds ===
Country	Player	Rank^{1}	Seed
ITA	Nuria Brancaccio	168	1
HUN	Réka Luca Jani	169	2
ESP	Leyre Romero Gormaz	187	3
HUN	Tímea Babos	194	4
SLO	Veronika Erjavec	241	5
SRB	Lola Radivojević	256	6
ROU	Alexandra Ignatik	262	7
BDI	Sada Nahimana	284	8

- ^{1} Rankings are as of 24 July 2023.

=== Other entrants ===
The following players received wildcards into the singles main draw:

- (Italy) Eleonora Alvisi
- (Italy) Diletta Cherubini
- (Italy) Lisa Pigato
- (Hungary) Fanny Stollár

The following players received entry from the qualifying draw:

- (Italy) Federica Di Sarra
- (Algeria) Inès Ibbou
- (United States) Rasheeda McAdoo
- (Italy) Tatiana Pieri
- (Italy) Jennifer Ruggeri
- (Italy) Dalila Spiteri
- (Netherlands) Lexie Stevens
- (Italy) Aurora Zantedeschi
