= 2023 Internazionali di Tennis del Friuli Venezia Giulia – Men's singles =

Men's singles
- 2023 Internazionali di Tennis del Friuli Venezia Giulia

Final
- Champion: (Italy) Matteo Gigante
- Runner-up: (Austria) Lukas Neumayer
- Score: 6–0, 6–2

Events
Singles	men	women
Doubles	men	women
← 2022 ·	Internazionali di Tennis del Friuli Venezia Giulia	· 2024 →

Zhang Zhizhen was the defending champion but chose not to defend his title.

Matteo Gigante won the title after defeating Lukas Neumayer 6–0, 6–2 in the final.

== Seeds ==
1. (Austria) Dennis Novak (first round)
2. (Italy) Francesco Passaro (second round)
3. (Italy) Riccardo Bonadio (semifinals)
4. (Italy) Matteo Gigante (champion)
5. (Romania) Nicholas David Ionel (second round)
6. (Argentina) Andrea Collarini (first round, retired)
7. (Italy) Edoardo Lavagno (second round)
8. (Argentina) Román Andrés Burruchaga (first round)

== Draw ==
=== Key ===
- Q = Qualifier
- WC = Wild card
- LL = Lucky loser
- Alt = Alternate
- SE = Special exempt
- PR = Protected ranking
- ITF = ITF entry
- JE = Junior exempt
- w/o = Walkover
- r = Retired
- d = Defaulted
- SR = Special ranking

=== Finals ===
Semifinals
(Austria) Lukas Neumayer	6	7^{15}
3	(Italy) Riccardo Bonadio	2	6^{13}
4	(Italy) Matteo Gigante	7^{7}	6
WC	(Italy) Enrico Dalla Valle	6^{5}	2

Final
(Austria) Lukas Neumayer	0	2
4	(Italy) Matteo Gigante	6	6

=== Top half ===
First round
1	(Austria) D Novak	2	2
(France) M Martineau	6	6
(France) M Chazal	2	6	6
(Chinese Taipei) C-h Tseng	6	3	4
WC	(Italy) G Ferrari	4	2
(Austria) L Neumayer	6	6
Q	(Italy) L Rottoli	5	6	6
8	(Argentina) RA Burruchaga	7	3	3
3	(Italy) R Bonadio	7	6
(Monaco) V Vacherot	5	4
(Italy) F Forti	2	4
(Italy) F Maestrelli	6	6
Q	(Italy) Fausto Tabacco	1	7	4
(Spain) C Sánchez Jover	6	5	6
(Italy) G Fonio	3	7	5
5	(Romania) ND Ionel	6	5	7

Second round
(France) M Martineau	6	6
(France) M Chazal	1	3
(Austria) L Neumayer	6	6
Q	(Italy) L Rottoli	1	4
3	(Italy) R Bonadio	6	6
(Italy) F Maestrelli	3	4
(Spain) C Sánchez Jover	1	6	6
5	(Romania) ND Ionel	6	0	2

Quarterfinals
(France) M Martineau	6	4	0
(Austria) L Neumayer	1	6	6
3	(Italy) R Bonadio	7	6
(Spain) C Sánchez Jover	5	3

Semifinals
(Austria) L Neumayer	6	7^{15}
3	(Italy) R Bonadio	2	6^{13}

=== Bottom half ===
First round
6	(Argentina) A Collarini	2	0^{r}
Q	(Italy) Federico Iannaccone	6	2
Q	(Argentina) Juan Bautista Otegui	4	4
(Argentina) H Casanova	6	6
(Spain) C Taberner	6	1	4
PR	(Slovenia) B Rola	2	6	6
Alt	(Ukraine) V Orlov	7^{7}	4	4
4	(Italy) M Gigante	6^{5}	6	6
7	(Italy) Edoardo Lavagno	6	4
WC	(Italy) F Arnaboldi	0	1^{r}
Q	(Argentina) FA Gómez	2	6	7^{7}
Q	(Argentina) G Villanueva	6	3	6^{2}
(Spain) A López San Martín	2	4
WC	(Italy) E Dalla Valle	6	6
(Czech Republic) M Vrbenský	2	0
2	(Italy) F Passaro	6	6

Second round
Q	(Italy) F Iannaccone	2	3
(Argentina) H Casanova	6	6
PR	(Slovenia) B Rola	5	2
4	(Italy) M Gigante	7	6
7	(Italy) E Lavagno	6	2	1
Q	(Argentina) FA Gómez	4	6	6
WC	(Italy) E Dalla Valle	6	6^{3}	6
2	(Italy) F Passaro	1	7^{7}	1

Quarterfinals
(Argentina) H Casanova	1	6^{2}
4	(Italy) M Gigante	6	7^{7}
Q	(Argentina) FA Gómez	3	1
WC	(Italy) E Dalla Valle	6	6

Semifinals
4	(Italy) M Gigante	7^{7}	6
WC	(Italy) E Dalla Valle	6^{5}	2
