= 2024 Internazionali di Tennis del Friuli Venezia Giulia – Women's singles =

Women's singles
- 2024 Internazionali di Tennis del Friuli Venezia Giulia

Final
- Champion: (Netherlands) Anouk Koevermans
- Runner-up: (Croatia) Lucija Ćirić Bagarić
- Score: 7–6^{(7–4)}, 6–2

Events
Singles	men	women
Doubles	men	women
← 2023 ·	Internazionali di Tennis del Friuli Venezia Giulia	· 2025 →

Veronika Erjavec was the defending champion, but lost in the semifinals to Lucija Ćirić Bagarić.

Anouk Koevermans won the title, defeating Ćirić Bagarić in the final, 7–6^{(7–4)}, 6–2.

== Seeds ==
1. (Slovenia) Tamara Zidanšek (second round)
2. (Croatia) Lucija Ćirić Bagarić (final)
3. (Spain) Leyre Romero Gormaz (second round)
4. (Slovenia) Veronika Erjavec (semifinals)
5. (Romania) Irina Bara (second round)
6. (Italy) Nuria Brancaccio (quarterfinals)
7. (Czech Republic) Barbora Palicová (quarterfinals, retired)
8. Sofya Lansere (first round)

== Draw ==
=== Key ===
- Q = Qualifier
- WC = Wild card
- LL = Lucky loser
- Alt = Alternate
- ITF = ITF entry
- PR = Protected ranking
- SR = Special ranking
- SE = Special exempt
- JE = Junior exempt
- JR = Junior Accelerator Programme entrant
- CO = College Accelerator Programme entrant
- NG = Next Gen Accelerator Program entrant
- w/o = Walkover
- r = Retired
- d = Defaulted

=== Finals ===
Semifinals
(Netherlands) Anouk Koevermans	6	7
(Netherlands) Eva Vedder	2	5
4	(Slovenia) Veronika Erjavec	6	4	6^{6}
2	(Croatia) Lucija Ćirić Bagarić	0	6	7^{8}

Final
(Netherlands) Anouk Koevermans	7^{7}	6
2	(Croatia) Lucija Ćirić Bagarić	6^{4}	2

=== Top half ===
First round
1	(Slovenia) T Zidanšek	6	6
(Slovenia) N Radišić	1	1
Q	(Romania) A Prisăcariu	1	1
(Netherlands) A Koevermans	6	6
(Ukraine) K Baindl	6	4	7
(Italy) D Spiteri	3	6	5
Q	(Slovakia) E Méri	4	2
5	(Romania) I Bara	6	6
3	(Spain) L Romero Gormaz	6	6
WC	(Italy) F Pace	1	2
(Ukraine) V Strakhova	3	2
(Netherlands) E Vedder	6	6
Q	(Italy) J Pieri	0	2
(Italy) A Zantedeschi	6	6
Q	(Italy) N Fossa Huergo	6	7^{8}
8	S Lansere	4	6^{6}

Second round
1	(Slovenia) T Zidanšek	4	2
(Netherlands) A Koevermans	6	6
(Ukraine) K Baindl	6	6
5	(Romania) I Bara	4	3
3	(Spain) L Romero Gormaz	2	3
(Netherlands) E Vedder	6	6
(Italy) A Zantedeschi	2	6	7^{8}
Q	(Italy) N Fossa Huergo	6	4	6^{6}

Quarterfinals
(Netherlands) A Koevermans	7	6
(Ukraine) K Baindl	5	4
(Netherlands) E Vedder	6	6
(Italy) A Zantedeschi	3	1

Semifinals
(Netherlands) A Koevermans	6	7
(Netherlands) E Vedder	2	5

=== Bottom half ===
First round
6	(Italy) N Brancaccio	6	6^{4}	6
WC	(Italy) F Urgesi	2	7^{7}	1
(Serbia) M Ristić	4	7^{7}	3
WC	(Italy) M Paoletti	6	6^{3}	6
(Switzerland) C Perrin	3	6	6
WC	(Italy) A Abbagnato	6	3	3
Q	(Germany) T Morderger	0	4
4	(Slovenia) V Erjavec	6	6
7	(Czech Republic) B Palicová	6	6
(Sweden) K Rinaldo Persson	4	3
Q	(Italy) S Rocchetti	6	6
D Lodikova	4	0
Q	A Anshba	6	1	6
(France) S Cakarevic	1	6	4
Q	K Zaytseva	4	1
2	(Croatia) L Ćirić Bagarić	6	6

Second round
6	(Italy) N Brancaccio	w/o
WC	(Italy) M Paoletti
(Switzerland) C Perrin	0	0
4	(Slovenia) V Erjavec	6	6
7	(Czech Republic) B Palicová	6	6
Q	(Italy) S Rocchetti	2	2
Q	A Anshba	7	1	2
2	(Croatia) L Ćirić Bagarić	5	6	6

Quarterfinals
6	(Italy) N Brancaccio	1	6^{5}
4	(Slovenia) V Erjavec	6	7^{7}
7	(Czech Republic) B Palicová	1	0^{r}
2	(Croatia) L Ćirić Bagarić	6	3

Semifinals
4	(Slovenia) V Erjavec	6	4	6^{6}
2	(Croatia) L Ćirić Bagarić	0	6	7^{8}
