= 2024 Internazionali di Tennis del Friuli Venezia Giulia – Women's doubles =

Women's doubles
- 2024 Internazionali di Tennis del Friuli Venezia Giulia

Final
- Champions: (Spain) Yvonne Cavallé Reimers (Italy) Aurora Zantedeschi
- Runners-up: (Italy) Nuria Brancaccio (Spain) Leyre Romero Gormaz
- Score: 7–5, 2–6, [10–5]

Events
Singles	men	women
Doubles	men	women
← 2023 ·	Internazionali di Tennis del Friuli Venezia Giulia	· 2025 →

Angelica Moratelli and Camilla Rosatello were the defending champions but chose to compete at the 2024 ITF World Tennis Tour Gran Canaria instead.

Yvonne Cavallé Reimers and Aurora Zantedeschi won the title, defeating Nuria Brancaccio and Leyre Romero Gormaz in the final, 7–5, 2–6, [10–5].

== Seeds ==
1. (United States) Quinn Gleason / (Ukraine) Valeriya Strakhova (quarterfinals)
2. (Switzerland) Conny Perrin / (Netherlands) Eva Vedder (quarterfinals)
3. (Spain) Yvonne Cavallé Reimers / (Italy) Aurora Zantedeschi (champions)
4. (United Kingdom) Alicia Barnett / (India) Prarthana Thombare (first round)

== Draw ==
=== Key ===
- Q = Qualifier
- WC = Wild card
- LL = Lucky loser
- Alt = Alternate
- ITF = ITF entry
- PR = Protected ranking
- SR = Special ranking
- SE = Special exempt
- JE = Junior exempt
- JR = Junior Accelerator Programme entrant
- CO = College Accelerator Programme entrant
- NG = Next Gen Accelerator Program entrant
- w/o = Walkover
- r = Retired
- d = Defaulted

First round
1	(United States) Q Gleason (Ukraine) V Strakhova	6	7^{7}
(Italy) A Abbagnato (Italy) B Ricci	2	6^{4}
(Brazil) G Cé; D Lodikova	1	1
(Romania) I Bara (Slovenia) N Radišić	6	6
3	(Spain) Y Cavallé Reimers (Italy) A Zantedeschi	6	6
WC	(Italy) F Pace (Italy) S Rocchetti	4	2
(Algeria) I Ibbou (Switzerland) N Karamoko	5	6^{4}
A Anshba; S Lansere	7	7^{7}
Alt	(Italy) AM Artimedi (Ukraine) M Kostiuk	3	2
WC	(Italy) E Alvisi (Italy) F Urgesi	6	6
(Italy) N Fossa Huergo; K Zaytseva	6	4	[10]
4	(United Kingdom) A Barnett (India) P Thombare	4	6	[7]
(Italy) N Brancaccio (Spain) L Romero Gormaz	6	6
(Germany) T Morderger (Germany) Y Morderger	2	0
(Slovenia) V Erjavec (Bosnia and Herzegovina) A Wagner	6^{4}	6	[7]
2	(Switzerland) C Perrin (Netherlands) E Vedder	7^{7}	4	[10]

Quarterfinals
1	(United States) Q Gleason (Ukraine) V Strakhova	6	3	[4]
(Romania) I Bara (Slovenia) N Radišić	1	6	[10]
3	(Spain) Y Cavallé Reimers (Italy) A Zantedeschi	6	7
A Anshba; S Lansere	3	5
WC	(Italy) E Alvisi (Italy) F Urgesi	7^{7}	5	[4]
(Italy) N Fossa Huergo; K Zaytseva	6^{5}	7	[10]
(Italy) N Brancaccio (Spain) L Romero Gormaz	7	7^{7}
2	(Switzerland) C Perrin (Netherlands) E Vedder	5	6^{2}

Semifinals
(Romania) I Bara (Slovenia) N Radišić	6	0	[7]
3	(Spain) Y Cavallé Reimers (Italy) A Zantedeschi	4	6	[10]
(Italy) N Fossa Huergo; K Zaytseva	0	6	[7]
(Italy) N Brancaccio (Spain) L Romero Gormaz	6	4	[10]

Final
3	(Spain) Y Cavallé Reimers (Italy) A Zantedeschi	7	2	[10]
(Italy) N Brancaccio (Spain) L Romero Gormaz	5	6	[5]
