= 2022 Internazionali di Tennis del Friuli Venezia Giulia =

Tennis tournament

- Date: 25–31 July 2022 (women); 1–7 August 2022 (men)
- Edition: 19th (men); 7th (women)
- Category: ATP Challenger Tour; ITF Women's World Tennis Tour
- Prize money: €45,730 (men) $60,000 (women)
- Surface: Clay / Outdoor
- Location: Cordenons, Italy

Champions

Men's singles
- (China) Zhang Zhizhen

Women's singles
- (Hungary) Panna Udvardy

Men's doubles
- (Jamaica) Dustin Brown / (Italy) Andrea Vavassori

Women's doubles
- (Italy) Angelica Moratelli / (Netherlands) Eva Vedder
← 2021 ·	Internazionali di Tennis del Friuli Venezia Giulia	· 2023 →

The 2022 Serena Wines 1881 Tennis Cup Internazionali di Tennis del Friuli Venezia Giulia was a professional tennis tournament played on outdoor clay courts. It was the nineteenth edition of the tournament which was part of the 2022 ATP Challenger Tour, and the seventh edition of the tournament which was part of the 2022 ITF Women's World Tennis Tour. It took place in Cordenons, Italy between 25 July and 7 August 2022.

== Champions ==
=== Men's singles ===
- (China) Zhang Zhizhen def. (Italy) Andrea Vavassori 2–6, 7–6^{(7–5)}, 6–3.

=== Men's doubles ===
- (Jamaica) Dustin Brown / (Italy) Andrea Vavassori def. (Serbia) Ivan Sabanov / (Serbia) Matej Sabanov 6–4, 7–5.

=== Women's singles ===
- (Hungary) Panna Udvardy def. Elina Avanesyan, 6–2, 6–0

=== Women's doubles ===
- (Italy) Angelica Moratelli / (Netherlands) Eva Vedder def. (Colombia) Yuliana Lizarazo / (Italy) Aurora Zantedeschi, 6–3, 6–2.

== Men's singles main-draw entrants ==
=== Seeds ===
Country	Player	Rank^{1}	Seed
SRB	Laslo Đere	77	1
ARG	Juan Manuel Cerúndolo	107	2
ARG	Camilo Ugo Carabelli	118	3
	Pavel Kotov	122	4
ITA	Flavio Cobolli	133	5
CZE	Zdeněk Kolář	134	6
FRA	Alexandre Müller	149	7
ITA	Marco Cecchinato	151	8

- ^{1} Rankings are as of 25 July 2022.

=== Other entrants ===
The following players received wildcards into the singles main draw:

- (Italy) Marco Cecchinato
- (Serbia) Laslo Đere
- (Italy) Gianmarco Ferrari

The following players received entry into the singles main draw as special exempts:

- (Italy) Raúl Brancaccio
- (Latvia) Ernests Gulbis

The following players received entry into the singles main draw as alternates:

- (Spain) Nikolás Sánchez Izquierdo
- (Italy) Andrea Vavassori

The following players received entry from the qualifying draw:

- (Italy) Mattia Bellucci
- (Belgium) Kimmer Coppejans
- (Italy) Giacomo Dambrosi
- (Portugal) João Domingues
- (Norway) Viktor Durasovic
- (United States) Nicolas Moreno de Alboran

The following player received entry as a lucky loser:

- Andrey Chepelev

== Women's singles main draw entrants ==
=== Seeds ===
Country	Player	Rank^{1}	Seed
HUN	Panna Udvardy	108	1
	Elina Avanesyan	129	2
AUT	Julia Grabher	145	3
CZE	Linda Fruhvirtová	153	4
ESP	Marina Bassols Ribera	211	5
~~ITA~~	~~Federica Di Sarra~~	~~222~~	~~6~~
GER	Katharina Gerlach	223	7
JPN	Kurumi Nara	237	8

- ^{1} Rankings are as of 18 July 2022.

=== Other entrants ===
The following players received wildcards into the singles main draw:

- (Italy) Matilde Paoletti
- (Italy) Jessica Pieri
- (Italy) Federica Urgesi
- (Italy) Aurora Zantedeschi

The following player received entry into the singles main draw as a special exempt:

- (Italy) Anna Turati

The following players received entry from the qualifying draw:

- (Italy) Federica Arcidiacono
- (Slovakia) Bianca Behúlová
- (Italy) Nuria Brancaccio
- (Slovenia) Veronika Erjavec
- (Italy) Angelica Moratelli
- (Germany) Tayisiya Morderger
- (Argentina) Julia Riera
- (Italy) Bianca Turati

The following players received as lucky losers:

- (Slovakia) Timea Jarušková
- (Italy) Arianna Zucchini
