= 2025 Internazionali di Tennis del Friuli Venezia Giulia – Men's singles =

Men's singles
- 2025 Internazionali di Tennis del Friuli Venezia Giulia

Final
- Champion: (Serbia) Dušan Lajović
- Runner-up: (Austria) Lukas Neumayer
- Score: 6–2, 7–6^{(7–3)}

Events
Singles	men	women
Doubles	men	women
- Internazionali di Tennis del Friuli Venezia Giulia

Vilius Gaubas was the defending champion but chose not to defend his title.

Dušan Lajović won the title after defeating Lukas Neumayer 6–2, 7–6^{(7–3)} in the final.

== Seeds ==
1. (Spain) Carlos Taberner (semifinals)
2. (Serbia) Dušan Lajović (champion)
3. (Hungary) Zsombor Piros (quarterfinals)
4. (Austria) Lukas Neumayer (final)
5. (Argentina) Santiago Rodríguez Taverna (quarterfinals)
6. (Belgium) Kimmer Coppejans (first round)
7. (United Kingdom) Jay Clarke (second round)
8. (Italy) Stefano Travaglia (first round)

== Draw ==
Key

- Q = Qualifier
- WC = Wild card
- LL = Lucky loser
- Alt = Alternate
- ITF = ITF entry
- PR = Protected ranking
- SR = Special ranking
- SE = Special exempt
- JE = Junior exempt
- JR = Junior Accelerator Programme entrant
- CO = College Accelerator Programme entrant
- NG = Next Gen Accelerator Program entrant
- w/o = Walkover
- r = Retired
- d = Defaulted

=== Finals ===
Semifinals
1/WC	(Spain) Carlos Taberner	1	3
4	(Austria) Lukas Neumayer	6	6
PR	(Germany) Cedrik-Marcel Stebe	2	2
2	(Serbia) Dušan Lajović	6	6

Final
4	(Austria) Lukas Neumayer	2	6^{3}
2	(Serbia) Dušan Lajović	6	7^{7}

=== Top half ===
First round
1/WC	(Spain) C Taberner	6	6
NG	(Italy) F Bondioli	3	1
Q	(Spain) M Alcalá Gurri	6	4	6
(Italy) L Giustino	2	6	4
(Peru) G Bueno	7^{7}	4	7
Q	(Netherlands) Ryan Nijboer	6^{4}	6	5
(Argentina) JB Torres	3	1
7	(United Kingdom) J Clarke	6	6
4	(Austria) L Neumayer	6	6
Q	(Argentina) M Kestelboim	3	3
WC	(Italy) G Piraino	6	6
(Netherlands) J Sels	4	2
Q	(Argentina) N Kicker	6	6
Q	(Bolivia) JC Prado Ángelo	3	4
Alt	(Ukraine) O Prihodko	6	1	7
8	(Italy) S Travaglia	3	6	5

Second round
1/WC	(Spain) C Taberner	6	6
Q	(Spain) M Alcalá Gurri	2	3
(Peru) G Bueno	6	7^{7}
7	(United Kingdom) J Clarke	4	6^{0}
4	(Austria) L Neumayer	6	6
WC	(Italy) G Piraino	4	2
Q	(Argentina) N Kicker	6	4	7^{7}
Alt	(Ukraine) O Prihodko	3	6	6^{3}

Quarterfinals
1/WC	(Spain) C Taberner	6	6
(Peru) G Bueno	2	2
4	(Austria) L Neumayer	5	7^{7}	6
Q	(Argentina) N Kicker	7	6^{5}	1

Semifinals
1/WC	(Spain) C Taberner	1	3
4	(Austria) L Neumayer	6	6

=== Bottom half ===
First round
6	(Belgium) K Coppejans	7^{9}	5	4
(Portugal) T Pereira	6^{7}	7	6
(Italy) F Arnaboldi	3	1
PR	(Germany) C-M Stebe	6	6
LL	(Netherlands) Michiel de Krom	2	2
(Monaco) V Vacherot	6	6
Q	(Czech Republic) Z Kolář	5	5
3	(Hungary) Z Piros	7	7
5	(Argentina) S Rodríguez Taverna	7^{7}	6
(Spain) N Sánchez Izquierdo	6^{4}	3
(Spain) C Sánchez Jover	6	7
LL	(Czech Republic) M Vrbenský	4	5
WC	(Italy) CA Caniato	6	6
PR	(Czech Republic) A Paulson	4	1
(Bolivia) M Dellien	1	2
2	(Serbia) D Lajović	6	6

Second round
(Portugal) T Pereira	6^{5}	6	0
PR	(Germany) C-M Stebe	7^{7}	4	6
(Monaco) V Vacherot	6^{4}	4
3	(Hungary) Z Piros	7^{7}	6
5	(Argentina) S Rodríguez Taverna	6	4	6
(Spain) C Sánchez Jover	3	6	4
WC	(Italy) CA Caniato	4	3
2	(Serbia) D Lajović	6	6

Quarterfinals
PR	(Germany) C-M Stebe	6	7^{7}
3	(Hungary) Z Piros	4	6^{2}
5	(Argentina) S Rodríguez Taverna	3	1
2	(Serbia) D Lajović	6	6

Semifinals
PR	(Germany) C-M Stebe	2	2
2	(Serbia) D Lajović	6	6
