= 2025 Internazionali di Tennis del Friuli Venezia Giulia – Men's doubles =

Men's doubles
- 2025 Internazionali di Tennis del Friuli Venezia Giulia

Final
- Champions: (Czech Republic) Andrew Paulson (Czech Republic) Michael Vrbenský
- Runners-up: (Bolivia) Boris Arias (Bolivia) Murkel Dellien
- Score: 6–4, 6–2

Events
Singles	men	women
Doubles	men	women
- Internazionali di Tennis del Friuli Venezia Giulia

Marco Bortolotti and Matthew Romios were the defending champions but chose not to defend their title.

Andrew Paulson and Michael Vrbenský won the title after defeating Boris Arias and Murkel Dellien 6–4, 6–2 in the final.

== Seeds ==
1. (India) Siddhant Banthia / (Bulgaria) Alexander Donski (first round)
2. Ivan Liutarevich / (Italy) Giorgio Ricca (quarterfinals)
3. (Argentina) Mariano Kestelboim / (Bolivia) Federico Zeballos (quarterfinals)
4. (Ukraine) Denys Molchanov / (Portugal) Tiago Pereira (first round)

== Draw ==
Key

- Q = Qualifier
- WC = Wild card
- LL = Lucky loser
- Alt = Alternate
- ITF = ITF entry
- PR = Protected ranking
- SR = Special ranking
- SE = Special exempt
- JE = Junior exempt
- JR = Junior Accelerator Programme entrant
- CO = College Accelerator Programme entrant
- NG = Next Gen Accelerator Program entrant
- w/o = Walkover
- r = Retired
- d = Defaulted

=== Draw ===
First round
1	(India) S Banthia (Bulgaria) A Donski	4	6	[9]
(Czech Republic) Z Kolář (Croatia) N Serdarušić	6	3	[11]
(Romania) A Jecan (Romania) B Pavel	6	6
WC	(Italy) A Guerrieri (Ukraine) Eric Vanshelboim	4	3
3	(Argentina) M Kestelboim (Bolivia) F Zeballos	6	7^{9}
(Brazil) L Britto (Israel) R Stepanov	4	6^{7}
(Bolivia) B Arias (Bolivia) M Dellien	6	6
(Spain) N Sánchez Izquierdo (Netherlands) J Sels	1	3
(Spain) M Mansilla Díez (Spain) B Pujol Navarro	6	6^{4}	[10]
4	(Ukraine) D Molchanov (Portugal) T Pereira	3	7^{7}	[7]
(Czech Republic) A Paulson (Czech Republic) M Vrbenský	7^{7}	6
(Uruguay) I Carou (Argentina) S Rodríguez Taverna	6^{4}	4
WC	(Italy) CA Caniato (Italy) Niccolò Catini	3	4
2	I Liutarevich (Italy) G Ricca	6	6

Quarterfinals
(Czech Republic) Z Kolář (Croatia) N Serdarušić	6	6
(Romania) A Jecan (Romania) B Pavel	4	3
3	(Argentina) M Kestelboim (Bolivia) F Zeballos	6	4	[9]
(Bolivia) B Arias (Bolivia) M Dellien	3	6	[11]
(United Kingdom) J Clarke (United Kingdom) M Whitehouse	4	2
(Spain) M Mansilla Díez (Spain) B Pujol Navarro	6	6
(Czech Republic) A Paulson (Czech Republic) M Vrbenský	7^{7}	6
2	I Liutarevich (Italy) G Ricca	6^{2}	2

Semifinals
(Czech Republic) Z Kolář (Croatia) N Serdarušić	6	2	[9]
(Bolivia) B Arias (Bolivia) M Dellien	4	6	[11]
(Spain) M Mansilla Díez (Spain) B Pujol Navarro	3	4
(Czech Republic) A Paulson (Czech Republic) M Vrbenský	6	6

Final
(Bolivia) B Arias (Bolivia) M Dellien	4	2
(Czech Republic) A Paulson (Czech Republic) M Vrbenský	6	6
