= 2022 Internazionali di Tennis del Friuli Venezia Giulia – Women's singles =

Women's singles
- 2022 Internazionali di Tennis del Friuli Venezia Giulia

Final
- Champion: (Hungary) Panna Udvardy
- Runner-up: Elina Avanesyan
- Score: 6–2, 6–0

Events
Singles	men	women
Doubles	men	women
← 2021 ·	Internazionali di Tennis del Friuli Venezia Giulia	· 2023 →

Mana Kawamura was the defending champion but chose not to participate.

Panna Udvardy won the title, defeating Elina Avanesyan in the final, 6–2, 6–0.

== Seeds ==
1. (Hungary) Panna Udvardy (champion)
2. Elina Avanesyan (final)
3. (Austria) Julia Grabher (semifinals)
4. (Czech Republic) Linda Fruhvirtová (quarterfinals)
5. (Spain) Marina Bassols Ribera (quarterfinals)
6. (Italy) Federica Di Sarra (withdrew)
7. (Germany) Katharina Gerlach (quarterfinals)
8. (Japan) Kurumi Nara (second round)

== Draw ==
=== Key ===
- Q = Qualifier
- WC = Wild card
- LL = Lucky loser
- Alt = Alternate
- SE = Special exempt
- PR = Protected ranking
- ITF = ITF entry
- JE = Junior exempt
- w/o = Walkover
- r = Retired
- d = Defaulted
- SR = Special ranking

=== Finals ===
Semifinals
1	(Hungary) Panna Udvardy	7	6
3	(Austria) Julia Grabher	5	1
Q	(Italy) Angelica Moratelli	3	3
2	Elina Avanesyan	6	6

Final
1	(Hungary) Panna Udvardy	6	6
2	Elina Avanesyan	2	0

=== Top half ===
First round
1	(Hungary) P Udvardy	7	6
WC	(Italy) F Urgesi	5	3
(Germany) L Papadakis	4	3
WC	(Italy) J Pieri	6	6
(Czech Republic) A Sisková	3	2
(Burundi) S Nahimana	6	6
(North Macedonia) L Gjorcheska	2	6	3
7	(Germany) K Gerlach	6	4	6
3	(Austria) J Grabher	4	6	6
(Netherlands) E Vedder	6	2	2
(Italy) C Rosatello	6	6
LL	(Slovakia) T Jarušková	3	0
WC	(Italy) M Paoletti	4	7	6
D Astakhova	6	5	3
Q	(Slovakia) B Behúlová	1	0
5	(Spain) M Bassols Ribera	6	6

Second round
1	(Hungary) P Udvardy	6	6
WC	(Italy) J Pieri	4	0
(Burundi) S Nahimana	6	4	1
7	(Germany) K Gerlach	3	6	6
3	(Austria) J Grabher	6	6
(Italy) C Rosatello	3	3
WC	(Italy) M Paoletti	1	5
5	(Spain) M Bassols Ribera	6	7

Quarterfinals
1	(Hungary) P Udvardy	6	7
7	(Germany) K Gerlach	3	5
3	(Austria) J Grabher	6	4	6
5	(Spain) M Bassols Ribera	0	6	3

Semifinals
1	(Hungary) P Udvardy	7	6
3	(Austria) J Grabher	5	1

=== Bottom half ===
First round
8	(Japan) K Nara	6	6
Q	(Argentina) J Riera	2	2
Q	(Italy) B Turati	4	0
Q	(Italy) A Moratelli	6	6
Q	(Italy) N Brancaccio	6	7
(Croatia) J Fett	0	6^{1}
(Bosnia and Herzegovina) N Berberović	0	6	3
4	(Czech Republic) L Fruhvirtová	6	4	6
LL	(Italy) A Zucchini	6	6
Q	(Italy) F Arcidiacono	2	2
SE	(Italy) A Turati	6	4	5
Q	(Slovenia) V Erjavec	2	6	7
WC	(Italy) A Zantedeschi	3	4
(Spain) I Burillo Escorihuela	6	6
Q	(Germany) T Morderger	2	1
2	E Avanesyan	6	6

Second round
8	(Japan) K Nara	6	3	3
Q	(Italy) A Moratelli	3	6	6
Q	(Italy) N Brancaccio	6	6^{4}	5
4	(Czech Republic) L Fruhvirtová	4	7^{7}	7
LL	(Italy) A Zucchini	6	0	0^{r}
Q	(Slovenia) V Erjavec	1	6	4
(Spain) I Burillo Escorihuela	0	0
2	E Avanesyan	6	6

Quarterfinals
Q	(Italy) A Moratelli	6	6
4	(Czech Republic) L Fruhvirtová	1	0
Q	(Slovenia) V Erjavec	2	4
2	E Avanesyan	6	6

Semifinals
Q	(Italy) A Moratelli	3	3
2	E Avanesyan	6	6
