= 2022 Internazionali di Tennis del Friuli Venezia Giulia – Men's singles =

Men's singles
- 2022 Internazionali di Tennis del Friuli Venezia Giulia

Final
- Champion: (China) Zhang Zhizhen
- Runner-up: (Italy) Andrea Vavassori
- Score: 2–6, 7–6^{(7–5)}, 6–3

Events
| Singles | men | women |
| Doubles | men | women |
| ← 2021 · | Internazionali di Tennis del Friuli Venezia Giulia | · 2023 → |

Francisco Cerúndolo was the defending champion but chose not to defend his title.

Zhang Zhizhen won the title after defeating Andrea Vavassori 2–6, 7–6^{(7–5)}, 6–3 in the final.

== Seeds ==
1. (Serbia) Laslo Đere (second round)
2. (Argentina) Juan Manuel Cerúndolo (first round)
3. (Argentina) Camilo Ugo Carabelli (first round)
4. Pavel Kotov (first round)
5. (Italy) Flavio Cobolli (first round)
6. (Czech Republic) Zdeněk Kolář (first round)
7. (France) Alexandre Müller (semifinals)
8. (Italy) Marco Cecchinato (first round)

== Draw ==
=== Key ===
- Q = Qualifier
- WC = Wild card
- LL = Lucky loser
- Alt = Alternate
- SE = Special exempt
- PR = Protected ranking
- ITF = ITF entry
- JE = Junior exempt
- w/o = Walkover
- r = Retired
- d = Defaulted
- SR = Special ranking

=== Finals ===
Semifinals
7 | (France) Alexandre Müller | 3 | 6 | 3
(China) Zhang Zhizhen | 6 | 4 | 6
Alt | (Italy) Andrea Vavassori | 6^{5} | 6 | 6
Q | (United States) Nicolas Moreno de Alboran | 7^{7} | 1 | 4

Final
(China) Zhang Zhizhen | 2 | 7^{7} | 6
Alt | (Italy) Andrea Vavassori | 6 | 6^{5} | 3

=== Top half ===
First round
1/WC | (Serbia) L Đere | 6 | 6
Q | (Belgium) K Coppejans | 4 | 2
(Italy) A Pellegrino | 6 | 6
Q | (Norway) V Durasovic | 4 | 4
SE | (Latvia) E Gulbis | 7^{7} | 6
Alt | (Spain) N Sánchez Izquierdo | 6^{5} | 4
(Italy) R Bonadio | 4 | 6^{3}
7 | (France) A Müller | 6 | 7^{7}
4 | P Kotov | 2 | 4
(China) Zh Zhang | 6 | 6
SE | (Italy) R Brancaccio | 2 | 6 | 2
(Serbia) N Milojević | 6 | 4 | 6
(Italy) S Travaglia | 6 | 2 | 4
(Croatia) N Serdarušić | 1 | 6 | 6
LL | Andrey Chepelev | 4 | 6 | 6
6 | (Czech Republic) Z Kolář | 6 | 2 | 0

Second round
1/WC | (Serbia) L Đere | 2 | 7 | 1
(Italy) A Pellegrino | 6 | 5 | 6
SE | (Latvia) E Gulbis | 3 | 0^{r}
7 | (France) A Müller | 6 | 2
(China) Zh Zhang | 5 | 6 | 6
(Serbia) N Milojević | 7 | 3 | 3
(Croatia) N Serdarušić | 6 | 3 | 4
LL | A Chepelev | 3 | 6 | 6

Quarterfinals
(Italy) A Pellegrino | 4 | 5
7 | (France) A Müller | 6 | 7
(China) Zh Zhang | 7^{7} | 6
LL | A Chepelev | 6^{5} | 4

Semifinals
7 | (France) A Müller | 3 | 6 | 3
(China) Zh Zhang | 6 | 4 | 6

=== Bottom half ===
First round
8/WC | (Italy) M Cecchinato | 4 | 6 | 4
Q | (Portugal) J Domingues | 6 | 2 | 6
Alt | (Italy) A Vavassori | 6 | 6
(France) G Blancaneaux | 1 | 2
(Italy) L Darderi | 5 | 4
(Bosnia and Herzegovina) D Džumhur | 7 | 6
Q | (Italy) M Bellucci | 6 | 6
3 | (Argentina) C Ugo Carabelli | 2 | 4
5 | (Italy) F Cobolli | 3 | 7 | 3
(Italy) M Arnaldi | 6 | 5 | 6
(Netherlands) J de Jong | 3 | 1
(Argentina) A Collarini | 6 | 6
Q | (United States) N Moreno de Alboran | 6 | 6
Q | (Italy) Giacomo Dambrosi | 3 | 4
WC | (Italy) G Ferrari | 6 | 6^{6} | 6
2 | (Argentina) JM Cerúndolo | 3 | 7^{8} | 4

Second round
Q | (Portugal) J Domingues | 6^{6} | 6^{1}
Alt | (Italy) A Vavassori | 7^{8} | 7^{7}
(Bosnia and Herzegovina) D Džumhur | 2 | 1
Q | (Italy) M Bellucci | 6 | 6
(Italy) M Arnaldi | 6 | 6
(Argentina) A Collarini | 0 | 3
Q | (United States) N Moreno de Alboran | 6 | 6
WC | (Italy) G Ferrari | 1 | 4

Quarterfinals
Alt | (Italy) A Vavassori | 2 | 7^{7} | 4
Q | (Italy) M Bellucci | 6 | 6^{5} | 1^{r}
(Italy) M Arnaldi | 6^{2} | 5
Q | (United States) N Moreno de Alboran | 7^{7} | 7

Semifinals
Alt | (Italy) A Vavassori | 6^{5} | 6 | 6
Q | (United States) N Moreno de Alboran | 7^{7} | 1 | 4
