= 2023 Internazionali di Tennis del Friuli Venezia Giulia – Women's doubles =

Women's doubles
- 2023 Internazionali di Tennis del Friuli Venezia Giulia

Final
- Champions: (Italy) Angelica Moratelli (Italy) Camilla Rosatello
- Runners-up: (Netherlands) Isabelle Haverlag (Netherlands) Eva Vedder
- Score: 0–6, 6–2 [10–5]

Events
| Singles | men | women |
| Doubles | men | women |
| ← 2022 · | Internazionali di Tennis del Friuli Venezia Giulia | · 2024 → |

Angelica Moratelli and Eva Vedder were the defending champions, but this year they competed with different partners. They met in the final, and Moratelli won the title with Camilla Rosatello, defeating Vedder and Isabelle Haverlag 0–6, 6–2 [10–5].

== Seeds ==
1. (Italy) Angelica Moratelli / (Italy) Camilla Rosatello (champions)
2. Amina Anshba / (United Kingdom) Emily Appleton (quarterfinals)
3. (Netherlands) Isabelle Haverlag / (Netherlands) Eva Vedder (final)
4. (Romania) Ilona Georgiana Ghioroaie / (Slovenia) Nika Radišić (first round)

== Draw ==
=== Key ===
- Q = Qualifier
- WC = Wild card
- LL = Lucky loser
- Alt = Alternate
- SE = Special exempt
- PR = Protected ranking
- ITF = ITF entry
- JE = Junior exempt
- w/o = Walkover
- r = Retired
- d = Defaulted
- SR = Special ranking

=== Draw ===
First round
1 | (Italy) A Moratelli (Italy) C Rosatello | 7 | 6
(Slovakia) K Kužmová (Czech Republic) J Štruplová | 5 | 1
WC | (Italy) D Chiesa (Italy) G Pedone | 6 | 6
(Italy) M Colmegna (Italy) L Pigato | 4 | 2
4 | (Romania) IG Ghioroaie (Slovenia) N Radišić | 6 | 0 | [7]
(Croatia) S Njirić (Italy) A Zantedeschi | 3 | 6 | [10]
(France) T Andrianjafitrimo (Netherlands) L Stevens | 6 | 6
WC | (Italy) SM Ricci (Germany) A Schäfer | 1 | 0
(United States) R McAdoo (Italy) D Spiteri | 6 | 4 | [10]
WC | (Italy) E Alvisi (Italy) D Cherubini | 4 | 6 | [7]
Alt | (Slovakia) E Méri (Czech Republic) I Šebestová | 3 | 4
3 | (Netherlands) I Haverlag (Netherlands) E Vedder | 6 | 6
(Spain) L Cortez Llorca (India) V Shinde | 4 | 7 | [3]
(Sweden) K Rinaldo Persson (Belgium) L Salden | 6 | 5 | [10]
(Italy) N Fossa Huergo (Algeria) I Ibbou | 5 | 4
2 | A Anshba (United Kingdom) E Appleton | 7 | 6

Quarterfinals
1 | (Italy) A Moratelli (Italy) C Rosatello | 6 | 6
WC | (Italy) D Chiesa (Italy) G Pedone | 3 | 2
(Croatia) S Njirić (Italy) A Zantedeschi | 6 | 2 | [2]
(France) T Andrianjafitrimo (Netherlands) L Stevens | 4 | 6 | [10]
(United States) R McAdoo (Italy) D Spiteri | 3 | 0
3 | (Netherlands) I Haverlag (Netherlands) E Vedder | 6 | 6
(Sweden) K Rinaldo Persson (Belgium) L Salden | 6 | 2 | [10]
2 | A Anshba (United Kingdom) E Appleton | 3 | 6 | [3]

Semifinals
1 | (Italy) A Moratelli (Italy) C Rosatello | 6 | 6
(France) T Andrianjafitrimo (Netherlands) L Stevens | 2 | 2
3 | (Netherlands) I Haverlag (Netherlands) E Vedder | 6 | 6
(Sweden) K Rinaldo Persson (Belgium) L Salden | 3 | 4

Final
1 | (Italy) A Moratelli (Italy) C Rosatello | 0 | 6 | [10]
3 | (Netherlands) I Haverlag (Netherlands) E Vedder | 6 | 2 | [5]
