= 2023 Internazionali di Tennis del Friuli Venezia Giulia – Women's singles =

Women's singles
- 2023 Internazionali di Tennis del Friuli Venezia Giulia

Final
- Champion: (Slovenia) Veronika Erjavec
- Runner-up: (Romania) Alexandra Cadanțu-Ignatik
- Score: 6–3, 6–4

Events
Singles	men	women
Doubles	men	women
← 2022 ·	Internazionali di Tennis del Friuli Venezia Giulia	· 2024 →

Panna Udvardy was the defending champion but chose not to participate.

Veronika Erjavec won the title, defeating Alexandra Cadanțu-Ignatik in the final, 6–3, 6–4.

== Seeds ==
1. (Italy) Nuria Brancaccio (first round)
2. (Hungary) Réka Luca Jani (second round)
3. (Spain) Leyre Romero Gormaz (first round)
4. (Hungary) Tímea Babos (first round)
5. (Slovenia) Veronika Erjavec (champion)
6. (Serbia) Lola Radivojević (first round)
7. (Romania) Alexandra Cadanțu-Ignatik (final)
8. (Burundi) Sada Nahimana (quarterfinals)

== Draw ==
=== Key ===
- Q = Qualifier
- WC = Wild card
- LL = Lucky loser
- Alt = Alternate
- SE = Special exempt
- PR = Protected ranking
- ITF = ITF entry
- JE = Junior exempt
- w/o = Walkover
- r = Retired
- d = Defaulted
- SR = Special ranking

=== Finals ===
Semifinals
Q	(Italy) Dalila Spiteri	1	6	1
7	(Romania) Alexandra Cadanțu-Ignatik	6	3	6
5	(Slovenia) Veronika Erjavec	6	6
WC	(Hungary) Fanny Stollár	3	2

Final
7	(Romania) Alexandra Cadanțu-Ignatik	3	4
5	(Slovenia) Veronika Erjavec	6	6

=== Top half ===
First round
1	(Italy) N Brancaccio	2	4
WC	(Italy) E Alvisi	6	6
(Italy) M Colmegna	5	3
Q	(Italy) D Spiteri	7	6
(France) T Andrianjafitrimo	3	6	6
(Germany) K Kanev	6	4	0
(Sweden) K Rinaldo Persson	6	6
6	(Serbia) L Radivojević	3	1
4	(Hungary) T Babos	1	6	6^{6}
Q	(Italy) A Zantedeschi	6	2	7^{8}
Q	(Italy) F Di Sarra	0	6	2
(United Kingdom) E Appleton	6	1	6
(Czech Republic) J Štruplová	2	0
Q	(Italy) T Pieri	6	6
Q	(Italy) J Ruggeri	4	0
7	(Romania) A Cadanțu-Ignatik	6	6

Second round
WC	(Italy) E Alvisi	3	1
Q	(Italy) D Spiteri	6	6
(France) T Andrianjafitrimo	2	6	6
(Sweden) K Rinaldo Persson	6	1	4
Q	(Italy) A Zantedeschi	4	4
(United Kingdom) E Appleton	6	6
Q	(Italy) T Pieri	6	2	0
7	(Romania) A Cadanțu-Ignatik	4	6	6

Quarterfinals
Q	(Italy) D Spiteri	6	6
(France) T Andrianjafitrimo	3	2
(United Kingdom) E Appleton	4	1
7	(Romania) A Cadanțu-Ignatik	6	6

Semifinals
Q	(Italy) D Spiteri	1	6	1
7	(Romania) A Cadanțu-Ignatik	6	3	6

=== Bottom half ===
First round
5	(Slovenia) V Erjavec	6	6
(Netherlands) E Vedder	3	0
WC	(Italy) D Cherubini	0	3
Q	(United States) R McAdoo	6	6
(Spain) L Cortez Llorca	3	4
Q	(Algeria) I Ibbou	6	6
(Italy) C Rosatello	2	6	6
3	(Spain) L Romero Gormaz	6	4	2
8	(Burundi) S Nahimana	6	6
WC	(Italy) L Pigato	2	1
Q	(Netherlands) L Stevens	2	1
(Italy) G Pedone	6	6
(Italy) A Turati	6^{5}	4
WC	(Hungary) F Stollár	7^{7}	6
(Italy) A Moratelli	4	2
2	(Hungary) RL Jani	6	6

Second round
5	(Slovenia) V Erjavec	6	6
Q	(United States) R McAdoo	0	2
Q	(Algeria) I Ibbou	4	4
(Italy) C Rosatello	6	6
8	(Burundi) S Nahimana	4	7^{8}	6
(Italy) G Pedone	6	6^{6}	2
WC	(Hungary) F Stollár	6	6
2	(Hungary) RL Jani	4	1

Quarterfinals
5	(Slovenia) V Erjavec	6	6
(Italy) C Rosatello	1	4
8	(Burundi) S Nahimana	2	6	6^{2}
WC	(Hungary) F Stollár	6	3	7^{7}

Semifinals
5	(Slovenia) V Erjavec	6	6
WC	(Hungary) F Stollár	3	2
