= 2022 Internazionali di Tennis del Friuli Venezia Giulia – Women's doubles =

Women's doubles
- 2022 Internazionali di Tennis del Friuli Venezia Giulia

Final
- Champions: (Italy) Angelica Moratelli (Netherlands) Eva Vedder
- Runners-up: (Colombia) Yuliana Lizarazo (Italy) Aurora Zantedeschi
- Score: 6–3, 6–2

Events
Singles	men	women
Doubles	men	women
← 2021 ·	Internazionali di Tennis del Friuli Venezia Giulia	· 2023 →

Martina Colmegna and Amy Zhu were the defending champions but chose not to participate.

Angelica Moratelli and Eva Vedder won the title, defeating Yuliana Lizarazo and Aurora Zantedeschi in the final, 6–3, 6–2.

== Seeds ==
1. (Italy) Angelica Moratelli / (Netherlands) Eva Vedder (champions)
2. (Indonesia) Beatrice Gumulya / (United States) Rasheeda McAdoo (semifinals)
3. / (withdrew)
4. (Germany) Tayisiya Morderger / (Germany) Yana Morderger (semifinals)
5. (Colombia) Yuliana Lizarazo / (Italy) Aurora Zantedeschi (final)

== Draw ==
=== Key ===
- Q = Qualifier
- WC = Wild card
- LL = Lucky loser
- Alt = Alternate
- ITF = ITF entry
- PR = Protected ranking
- SR = Special ranking
- SE = Special exempt
- JE = Junior exempt
- JR = Junior Accelerator Programme entrant
- CO = College Accelerator Programme entrant
- NG = Next Gen Accelerator Program entrant
- w/o = Walkover
- r = Retired
- d = Defaulted

=== Draw ===
First round
WC	(Italy) M Marcon (Italy) SM Ricci	3	2
(Ukraine) M Kostiuk (Austria) K Peckl	6	6
(Chinese Taipei) Y-c Hsieh (China) Jin Lu
(Italy) F Arcidiacono (Germany) K Gerlach	w/o
E Koklina (Georgia (country)) S Shapatava	4^{r}
(Italy) M Di Giuseppe (Italy) F Urgesi	5

Quarterfinals
1	(Italy) A Moratelli (Netherlands) E Vedder	7^{10}	6
(Spain) I Burillo Escorihuela (Germany) L Papadakis	6^{8}	1
4	(Germany) T Morderger (Germany) Y Morderger	6	6
(Ukraine) M Kostiuk (Austria) K Peckl	1	1
(Italy) F Arcidiacono (Germany) K Gerlach	6^{5}	7	[6]
5	(Colombia) Y Lizarazo (Italy) A Zantedeschi	7^{7}	5	[10]
(Italy) M Di Giuseppe (Italy) F Urgesi	3	4
2	(Indonesia) B Gumulya (United States) R McAdoo	6	6

Semifinals
1	(Italy) A Moratelli (Netherlands) E Vedder	1	6	[10]
4	(Germany) T Morderger (Germany) Y Morderger	6	0	[4]
5	(Colombia) Y Lizarazo (Italy) A Zantedeschi	3	7	[10]
2	(Indonesia) B Gumulya (United States) R McAdoo	6	5	[6]

Final
1	(Italy) A Moratelli (Netherlands) E Vedder	6	6
5	(Colombia) Y Lizarazo (Italy) A Zantedeschi	3	2
