= 2024 Internazionali di Tennis del Friuli Venezia Giulia – Men's singles =

Men's singles
- 2024 Internazionali di Tennis del Friuli Venezia Giulia

Final
- Champion: (Lithuania) Vilius Gaubas
- Runner-up: (Spain) Carlos Taberner
- Score: 2–6, 6–2, 6–4

Events
Singles	men	women
Doubles	men	women
- Internazionali di Tennis del Friuli Venezia Giulia

Matteo Gigante was the defending champion but chose not to defend his title.

Vilius Gaubas won the title after defeating Carlos Taberner 2–6, 6–2, 6–4 in the final.

== Seeds ==
1. (Spain) Albert Ramos Viñolas (second round)
2. (United States) Nicolas Moreno de Alboran (first round)
3. (Spain) Daniel Rincón (first round)
4. (Lithuania) Vilius Gaubas (champion)
5. (United Kingdom) Oliver Crawford (first round)
6. (Bosnia and Herzegovina) Nerman Fatić (first round)
7. (Italy) Francesco Maestrelli (first round)
8. (Italy) Federico Arnaboldi (quarterfinals)

== Draw ==
Key

- Q = Qualifier
- WC = Wild card
- LL = Lucky loser
- Alt = Alternate
- ITF = ITF entry
- PR = Protected ranking
- SR = Special ranking
- SE = Special exempt
- JE = Junior exempt
- JR = Junior Accelerator Programme entrant
- CO = College Accelerator Programme entrant
- NG = Next Gen Accelerator Program entrant
- w/o = Walkover
- r = Retired
- d = Defaulted

=== Finals ===
Semifinals
Alt	(Czech Republic) Andrew Paulson	5	0^{r}
4	(Lithuania) Vilius Gaubas	7	0
(Belgium) Alexander Blockx	3	4
(Spain) Carlos Taberner	6	6

Final
4	(Lithuania) Vilius Gaubas	2	6	6
(Spain) Carlos Taberner	6	2	4

=== Top half ===
First round
1	(Spain) A Ramos Viñolas	6	6
(Austria) L Neumayer	4	4
(Argentina) A Collarini	7	6
Q	(Croatia) L Mikrut	5	1
(Slovenia) Filip Jeff Planinšek	6^{10}	6	1
Alt	(Czech Republic) A Paulson	7^{12}	2	6
(Turkey) E Kırkın	1	7	6
5	(United Kingdom) O Crawford	6	5	2
4	(Lithuania) V Gaubas	7	6
(United Kingdom) F Gill	5	3
Q	(Argentina) LE Ambrogi	6^{2}	6	7
(Spain) N Sánchez Izquierdo	7^{7}	3	5
Q	(Italy) Andrea Picchione	5	6	4
(Italy) L Giustino	7	2	6
(Italy) Samuel Vincent Ruggeri	7	7^{7}
7/WC	(Italy) F Maestrelli	5	6^{5}

Second round
1	(Spain) A Ramos Viñolas	6^{5}	1
(Argentina) A Collarini	7^{7}	6
Alt	(Czech Republic) A Paulson	3	6	6
(Turkey) E Kırkın	6	0	4
4	(Lithuania) V Gaubas	6	6
Q	(Argentina) LE Ambrogi	2	4
(Italy) L Giustino	6	6
(Italy) S Vincent Ruggeri	1	1

Quarterfinals
(Argentina) A Collarini	6	4	6^{5}
Alt	(Czech Republic) A Paulson	4	6	7^{7}
4	(Lithuania) V Gaubas	6	6
(Italy) L Giustino	4	4

Semifinals
Alt	(Czech Republic) A Paulson	5	0^{r}
4	(Lithuania) V Gaubas	7	0

=== Bottom half ===
First round
8/WC	(Italy) F Arnaboldi	6	6
(Croatia) M Dodig	4	3
Q	(Netherlands) Ryan Nijboer	3	0
Q	(Italy) Alessandro Pecci	6	6
(Romania) C Crețu	6	6
(Germany) M Möller	4	1
(Belgium) A Blockx	3	6	6
3	(Spain) D Rincón	6	4	4
6	(Bosnia and Herzegovina) N Fatić	5	6	3
(Austria) J Schwärzler	7	2	6
WC	(Italy) R Bonadio	6	6
(Ukraine) V Sachko	4	2
Q	(Croatia) N Serdarušić	4	6	0
(Spain) C Taberner	6	1	6
Alt	(Austria) S Kopp	7^{8}	6
2	(United States) N Moreno de Alboran	6^{6}	2

Second round
8/WC	(Italy) F Arnaboldi	6	6
Q	(Italy) A Pecci	3	1
(Romania) C Crețu	4	4
(Belgium) A Blockx	6	6
(Austria) J Schwärzler	5	3
WC	(Italy) R Bonadio	7	6
(Spain) C Taberner	6	6
Alt	(Austria) S Kopp	4	3

Quarterfinals
8/WC	(Italy) F Arnaboldi	3	2
(Belgium) A Blockx	6	6
WC	(Italy) R Bonadio	4	3
(Spain) C Taberner	6	6

Semifinals
(Belgium) A Blockx	3	4
(Spain) C Taberner	6	6
