= 2022 Internazionali di Tennis del Friuli Venezia Giulia – Men's doubles =

Men's doubles
- 2022 Internazionali di Tennis del Friuli Venezia Giulia

Final
- Champions: (Jamaica) Dustin Brown (Italy) Andrea Vavassori
- Runners-up: (Serbia) Ivan Sabanov (Serbia) Matej Sabanov
- Score: 6–4, 7–5

Events
Singles	men	women
Doubles	men	women
- Internazionali di Tennis del Friuli Venezia Giulia

Orlando Luz and Rafael Matos were the defending champions but chose not to defend their title.

Dustin Brown and Andrea Vavassori won the title after defeating Ivan and Matej Sabanov 6–4, 7–5 in the final.

== Seeds ==
1. (Serbia) Ivan Sabanov / (Serbia) Matej Sabanov (final)
2. (Ukraine) Denys Molchanov / (Slovakia) Igor Zelenay (semifinals)
3. (Jamaica) Dustin Brown / (Italy) Andrea Vavassori (champions)
4. (Italy) Marco Bortolotti / (Spain) Sergio Martos Gornés (semifinals)

== Draw ==
Key

- Q = Qualifier
- WC = Wild card
- LL = Lucky loser
- Alt = Alternate
- ITF = ITF entry
- PR = Protected ranking
- SR = Special ranking
- SE = Special exempt
- JE = Junior exempt
- JR = Junior Accelerator Programme entrant
- CO = College Accelerator Programme entrant
- NG = Next Gen Accelerator Program entrant
- w/o = Walkover
- r = Retired
- d = Defaulted

First round
1	(Serbia) I Sabanov (Serbia) M Sabanov	6	6
Alt	(Italy) Matteo Marfia (Italy) M Viola	1	1
Yan Bondarevskiy; P Kotov	6	3	[8]
WC	(Italy) M Bellucci (Italy) Davide Pozzi	4	6	[10]
4	(Italy) M Bortolotti (Spain) S Martos Gornés	6	6
(Norway) V Durasovic (Ukraine) G Kravchenko	1	1
PR	(Argentina) A Collarini (Italy) E Dalla Valle	2	2
(Germany) F Fallert (Germany) H Jebens	6	6
(Romania) M Copil (Brazil) F Romboli	3	6	[10]
(Romania) VV Cornea (Czech Republic) Z Kolář	6	3	[6]
(Argentina) C Ugo Carabelli (Argentina) Matías Zukas	5	1
3	(Jamaica) D Brown (Italy) A Vavassori	7	6
(Italy) M Arnaldi (Italy) R Bonadio	2	7	[10]
Andrey Chepelev (Romania) A Jecan	6	5	[7]
Alt	(Italy) Riccardo Balzerani (Italy) Samuel Vincent Ruggeri	6^{0}	1
2	(Ukraine) D Molchanov (Slovakia) I Zelenay	7^{7}	6

Quarterfinals
1	(Serbia) I Sabanov (Serbia) M Sabanov	6	7
WC	(Italy) M Bellucci (Italy) D Pozzi	2	5
4	(Italy) M Bortolotti (Spain) S Martos Gornés	6	3	[10]
(Germany) F Fallert (Germany) H Jebens	3	6	[3]
(Romania) M Copil (Brazil) F Romboli	6	6^{3}	[9]
3	(Jamaica) D Brown (Italy) A Vavassori	1	7^{7}	[11]
(Italy) M Arnaldi (Italy) R Bonadio	4	6^{1}
2	(Ukraine) D Molchanov (Slovakia) I Zelenay	6	7^{7}

Semifinals
1	(Serbia) I Sabanov (Serbia) M Sabanov	6	7^{9}
4	(Italy) M Bortolotti (Spain) S Martos Gornés	2	6^{7}
3	(Jamaica) D Brown (Italy) A Vavassori	7^{7}	6^{5}	[10]
2	(Ukraine) D Molchanov (Slovakia) I Zelenay	6^{4}	7^{7}	[3]

Final
1	(Serbia) I Sabanov (Serbia) M Sabanov	4	5
3	(Jamaica) D Brown (Italy) A Vavassori	6	7
