= 2024 Internazionali di Tennis del Friuli Venezia Giulia =

Tennis tournament

- Date: 29 July–4 August 2024 (women); 5–11 August 2024 (men)
- Edition: 21st (men); 9th (women)
- Category: ATP Challenger Tour; ITF Women's World Tennis Tour
- Prize money: €74,825 (men) $60,000 (women)
- Surface: Clay / Outdoor
- Location: Cordenons, Italy

Champions

Men's singles
- (Lithuania) Vilius Gaubas

Women's singles
- (Netherlands) Anouk Koevermans

Men's doubles
- (Italy) Marco Bortolotti / (Australia) Matthew Romios

Women's doubles
- (Spain) Yvonne Cavallé Reimers / (Italy) Aurora Zantedeschi
- Internazionali di Tennis del Friuli Venezia Giulia

The 2024 Serena Wines 1881 Acqua Maniva Tennis Cup Internazionali di Tennis del Friuli Venezia Giulia was a professional tennis tournament played on outdoor clay courts. It was the twenty-first edition of the tournament for men, which was part of the 2024 ATP Challenger Tour, and the ninth edition for women, which was part of the 2024 ITF Women's World Tennis Tour. It took place in Cordenons, Italy, between 29 July and 11 August 2024.

== Champions ==
=== Men's singles ===
- (Lithuania) Vilius Gaubas def. (Spain) Carlos Taberner 2–6, 6–2, 6–4.

=== Women's singles ===
- (Netherlands) Anouk Koevermans def. (Croatia) Lucija Ćirić Bagarić, 7–6^{(7–4)}, 6–2

=== Men's doubles ===
- (Italy) Marco Bortolotti / (Australia) Matthew Romios def. (Czech Republic) Jiří Barnat / (Czech Republic) Andrew Paulson by walkover.

=== Women's doubles ===
- (Spain) Yvonne Cavallé Reimers / (Italy) Aurora Zantedeschi def. (Italy) Nuria Brancaccio / (Spain) Leyre Romero Gormaz, 7–5, 2–6, [10–5]

== Men's singles main-draw entrants ==
=== Seeds ===
Country	Player	Rank^{1}	Seed
ESP	Albert Ramos Viñolas	121	1
USA	Nicolas Moreno de Alboran	142	2
ESP	Daniel Rincón	200	3
LTU	Vilius Gaubas	226	4
GBR	Oliver Crawford	227	5
BIH	Nerman Fatić	243	6
ITA	Francesco Maestrelli	247	7
ITA	Federico Arnaboldi	251	8

- ^{1} Rankings are as of 29 July 2024.

=== Other entrants ===
The following players received wildcards into the singles main draw:

- (Italy) Federico Arnaboldi
- (Italy) Riccardo Bonadio
- (Italy) Francesco Maestrelli

The following players received entry into the singles main draw as alternates:

- (Austria) Sandro Kopp
- (Czech Republic) Andrew Paulson

The following players received entry from the qualifying draw:

- (Argentina) Luciano Emanuel Ambrogi
- (Croatia) Luka Mikrut
- (Netherlands) Ryan Nijboer
- (Italy) Alessandro Pecci
- (Italy) Andrea Picchione
- (Croatia) Nino Serdarušić

== Women's singles main draw entrants ==
=== Seeds ===
Country	Player	Rank	Seed
SLO	Tamara Zidanšek	120	1
CRO	Lucija Ćirić Bagarić	165	2
ESP	Leyre Romero Gormaz	179	3
SLO	Veronika Erjavec	183	4
ROU	Irina Bara	221	5
ITA	Nuria Brancaccio	251	6
CZE	Barbora Palicová	263	7
	Sofya Lansere	266	8

- Rankings are as of 22 July 2024.

=== Other entrants ===
The following players received wildcards into the singles main draw:

- (Italy) Anastasia Abbagnato
- (Italy) Francesca Pace
- (Italy) Matilde Paoletti
- (Italy) Federica Urgesi

The following players received entry from the qualifying draw:

- Amina Anshba
- (Italy) Nicole Fossa Huergo
- (Slovakia) Eszter Méri
- (Germany) Tayisiya Morderger
- (Italy) Jessica Pieri
- (Romania) Andreea Prisăcariu
- (Italy) Sofia Rocchetti
- Ksenia Zaytseva
