= 2025 Internazionali di Tennis del Friuli Venezia Giulia =

- Date: 28 July–3 August (women); 4–10 August (men)
- Edition: 22nd (men); 10th (women)
- Category: ATP Challenger Tour; ITF Women's World Tennis Tour
- Surface: Clay / Outdoor
- Location: Cordenons, Italy

Champions

Men's singles
- (Serbia) Dušan Lajović

Women's singles
- (Italy) Nuria Brancaccio

Men's doubles
- (Czech Republic) Andrew Paulson / (Czech Republic) Michael Vrbenský

Women's doubles
- (Chinese Taipei) Liang En-shuo / (Thailand) Peangtarn Plipuech
- Internazionali di Tennis del Friuli Venezia Giulia

The 2025 Serena Wines 1881 Acqua Maniva Tennis Cup Internazionali di Tennis del Friuli Venezia Giulia was a professional tennis tournament played on outdoor clay courts. It was the 22nd edition of the tournament for men, which was part of the 2025 ATP Challenger Tour, and the 10th edition for women, which was part of the 2025 ITF Women's World Tennis Tour. It took place in Cordenons, Italy, between 28 July and 10 August 2025.

== Champions ==
=== Men's singles ===
- (Serbia) Dušan Lajović def. (Austria) Lukas Neumayer 6–2, 7–6^{(7–3)}.

=== Women's singles ===
- (Italy) Nuria Brancaccio def. (Slovenia) Veronika Erjavec 6–2, 6–1.

=== Men's doubles ===
- (Czech Republic) Andrew Paulson / (Czech Republic) Michael Vrbenský def. (Bolivia) Boris Arias / (Bolivia) Murkel Dellien 6–4, 6–2.

=== Women's doubles ===
- (Chinese Taipei) Liang En-shuo / (Thailand) Peangtarn Plipuech def. (Czech Republic) Karolína Kubáňová / (Czech Republic) Aneta Laboutková 6–4, 6–2.

== Men's singles main-draw entrants ==
=== Seeds ===
Country	Player	Rank^{1}	Seed
ESP	Carlos Taberner	84	1
SRB	Dušan Lajović	145	2
HUN	Zsombor Piros	162	3
AUT	Lukas Neumayer	172	4
ARG	Santiago Rodríguez Taverna	185	5
BEL	Kimmer Coppejans	194	6
GBR	Jay Clarke	199	7
ITA	Stefano Travaglia	228	8

- ^{1} Rankings are as of 28 July 2025.

=== Other entrants ===
The following players received wildcards into the singles main draw:

- (Italy) Carlo Alberto Caniato
- (Italy) Gabriele Piraino
- (Spain) Carlos Taberner

The following players received entry into the singles main draw using protected rankings:

- (Czech Republic) Andrew Paulson
- (Germany) Cedrik-Marcel Stebe

The following player received entry into the singles main draw through the Junior Accelerator programme:

- (Czech Republic) ~~Maxim Mrva~~

The following player received entry into the singles main draw through the Next Gen Accelerator programme:

- (Italy) Federico Bondioli

The following player received entry into the singles main draw as an alternate:

- (Ukraine) Oleg Prihodko

The following players received entry from the qualifying draw:

- (Spain) Max Alcalá Gurri
- (Argentina) Mariano Kestelboim
- (Argentina) Nicolás Kicker
- (Czech Republic) Zdeněk Kolář
- (Netherlands) Ryan Nijboer
- (Bolivia) Juan Carlos Prado Ángelo

The following players received entry as lucky losers:

- (Netherlands) Michiel de Krom
- (Czech Republic) Michael Vrbenský
