= 2026 Challenger Città di Cervia – Singles =

Singles
- 2026 Challenger Città di Cervia

Final
- Champion: (Spain) Max Alcalá Gurri
- Runner-up: (Belgium) Buvaysar Gadamauri
- Score: 2–6, 6–1, 6–1

Events
Singles	Doubles
- Challenger Città di Cervia

This was the first edition of the tournament.

Max Alcalá Gurri won the title after defeating Buvaysar Gadamauri 2–6, 6–1, 6–1 in the final.

== Seeds ==
1. (Italy) Andrea Guerrieri (semifinals)
2. (Argentina) Guido Iván Justo (second round)
3. (United States) Stefan Dostanic (second round)
4. (United States) Mitchell Krueger (first round)
5. (Uruguay) Franco Roncadelli (withdrew)
6. (Belgium) Buvaysar Gadamauri (final)
7. (Italy) Michele Ribecai (second round)
8. (France) Moïse Kouamé (first round)

== Draw ==
Key

- Q = Qualifier
- WC = Wild card
- LL = Lucky loser
- Alt = Alternate
- ITF = ITF entry
- PR = Protected ranking
- SR = Special ranking
- SE = Special exempt
- JE = Junior exempt
- JR = Junior Accelerator Programme entrant
- CO = College Accelerator Programme entrant
- NG = Next Gen Accelerator Program entrant
- w/o = Walkover
- r = Retired
- d = Defaulted

=== Finals ===
Semifinals
1	(Italy) Andrea Guerrieri	5	5
(Spain) Max Alcalá Gurri	7	7
6	(Belgium) Buvaysar Gadamauri	3	6	7^{14}
Q	(Italy) Tommaso Compagnucci	6	4	6^{12}

Final
(Spain) Max Alcalá Gurri	2	6	6
6	(Belgium) Buvaysar Gadamauri	6	1	1

=== Top half ===
First round
1	(Italy) A Guerrieri	6^{5}	6	6
(Ukraine) O Prihodko	7^{7}	3	2
WC	(Italy) L Rottoli	4	3
(Italy) G Piraino	6	6
Q	(Italy) F Arnaboldi	2	4
(Italy) CA Caniato	6	6
JR	(Bulgaria) I Ivanov	5	1
LL	(Italy) Lorenzo Carboni	7	6
3	(United States) S Dostanic	2	7^{7}	6
Q	(Italy) F Forti	6	6^{3}	4
(Austria) S Kopp	1	6^{6}
(Spain) M Alcalá Gurri	6	7^{8}
Q	(Italy) Federico Iannaccone	4	6	4
WC	(Italy) Juan Cruz Martin Manzano	6	2	6
(Greece) Ioannis Xilas	4	1
7	(Italy) M Ribecai	6	6

Second round
1	(Italy) A Guerrieri	6	6
(Italy) G Piraino	1	4
(Italy) CA Caniato	7^{7}	2	6
LL	(Italy) L Carboni	6^{5}	6	4
3	(United States) S Dostanic	2	1
(Spain) M Alcalá Gurri	6	6
WC	(Italy) JC Martin Manzano	5	6	6
7	(Italy) M Ribecai	7	3	4

Quarterfinals
1	(Italy) A Guerrieri	7^{7}	7
(Italy) CA Caniato	6^{3}	5
(Spain) M Alcalá Gurri	6	5	6
WC	(Italy) JC Martin Manzano	0	7	2

Semifinals
1	(Italy) A Guerrieri	5	5
(Spain) M Alcalá Gurri	7	7

=== Bottom half ===
First round
6	(Belgium) B Gadamauri	6	6
(Romania) C Crețu	4	4
(Romania) A Boitan	6	7
(Argentina) S Rodríguez Taverna	4	5
LL	(Bulgaria) P Nesterov	6	6
(Italy) F Bondioli	2	4
NG	(India) M Dhamne	3	6	7^{10}
4	(United States) M Krueger	6	4	6^{8}
8	(France) M Kouamé	3	6^{3}
WC	(Italy) J Vasamì	6	7^{7}
(Italy) F Romano	4	3
Q	(Italy) E Dalla Valle	6	6
Q	(Italy) Tommaso Compagnucci	7	6
(Australia) L Tu	5	4
Q	(Italy) G Oradini	4	4
2	(Argentina) GI Justo	6	6

Second round
6	(Belgium) B Gadamauri	6	6
(Romania) A Boitan	4	4
LL	(Bulgaria) P Nesterov	6	3	6
NG	(India) M Dhamne	0	6	4
WC	(Italy) J Vasamì	2	7^{7}	6^{8}
Q	(Italy) E Dalla Valle	6	6^{4}	7^{10}
Q	(Italy) T Compagnucci	6	6
2	(Argentina) GI Justo	2	4

Quarterfinals
6	(Belgium) B Gadamauri	6	6
LL	(Bulgaria) P Nesterov	4	4
Q	(Italy) E Dalla Valle	6^{5}	4
Q	(Italy) T Compagnucci	7^{7}	6

Semifinals
6	(Belgium) B Gadamauri	3	6	7^{14}
Q	(Italy) T Compagnucci	6	4	6^{12}
