= 2026 Challenger Città di Cervia – Doubles =

Doubles
- 2026 Challenger Città di Cervia

Final
- Champions: (Italy) Francesco Forti (Italy) Filippo Romano
- Runners-up: (Argentina) Santiago Rodríguez Taverna (Spain) David Vega Hernández
- Score: 6–3, 6–4

Events
Singles	Doubles
- Challenger Città di Cervia

This was the first edition of the tournament.

Francesco Forti and Filippo Romano won the title after defeating Santiago Rodríguez Taverna and David Vega Hernández 6–3, 6–4 in the final.

== Seeds ==
1. (Netherlands) Thijmen Loof / (Czech Republic) David Poljak (quarterfinals)
2. (Argentina) Santiago Rodríguez Taverna / (Spain) David Vega Hernández (final)
3. (Venezuela) Juan José Bianchi / (United States) Joshua Sheehy (semifinals)
4. (Netherlands) Mats Hermans / (Italy) Giorgio Ricca (first round)

== Draw ==
Key

- Q = Qualifier
- WC = Wild card
- LL = Lucky loser
- Alt = Alternate
- ITF = ITF entry
- PR = Protected ranking
- SR = Special ranking
- SE = Special exempt
- JE = Junior exempt
- JR = Junior Accelerator Programme entrant
- CO = College Accelerator Programme entrant
- NG = Next Gen Accelerator Program entrant
- w/o = Walkover
- r = Retired
- d = Defaulted

First round
1	(Netherlands) T Loof (Czech Republic) D Poljak	6	6
Alt	(Italy) Lorenzo Bocchi (Italy) Alessio De Bernardis	3	1
Alt	(Italy) L Rottoli (Italy) Samuel Vincent Ruggeri	5	7^{7}	[7]
(Italy) F Forti (Italy) F Romano	7	6^{5}	[10]
4	(Netherlands) M Hermans (Italy) G Ricca	5	6^{4}
(Belgium) B Gadamauri (Australia) L Tu	7	7^{7}
(Bulgaria) A Genov (Bulgaria) P Nesterov	6	6
(Italy) Tommaso Compagnucci (Italy) M Ribecai	0	3
(Romania) C Crețu (Ukraine) V Uzhylovskyi	6	6
(Italy) Federico Iannaccone (Italy) Giorgio Tabacco	3	4
(United Kingdom) S Duncan (Argentina) F Ribero	6^{1}	6^{4}
3	(Venezuela) Juan José Bianchi (United States) J Sheehy	7^{7}	7^{7}
(Italy) Simone Agostini (Italy) Lorenzo Carboni	7	3	[8]
(Spain) M Alcalá Gurri (Greece) Ioannis Xilas	5	6	[10]
(Italy) Juan Cruz Martin Manzano (Italy) J Vasamì
2	(Argentina) S Rodríguez Taverna (Spain) D Vega Hernández	w/o

Quarterfinals
1	(Netherlands) T Loof (Czech Republic) D Poljak	3	4
(Italy) F Forti (Italy) F Romano	6	6
(Belgium) B Gadamauri (Australia) L Tu	6	7^{7}
(Bulgaria) A Genov (Bulgaria) P Nesterov	3	6^{5}
(Romania) C Crețu (Ukraine) V Uzhylovskyi	3	4
3	(Venezuela) JJ Bianchi (United States) J Sheehy	6	6
(Spain) M Alcalá Gurri (Greece) I Xilas	3	6^{3}
2	(Argentina) S Rodríguez Taverna (Spain) D Vega Hernández	6	7^{7}

Semifinals
(Italy) F Forti (Italy) F Romano	w/o
(Belgium) B Gadamauri (Australia) L Tu
3	(Venezuela) JJ Bianchi (United States) J Sheehy	4	5
2	(Argentina) S Rodríguez Taverna (Spain) D Vega Hernández	6	7

Final
(Italy) F Forti (Italy) F Romano	6	6
2	(Argentina) S Rodríguez Taverna (Spain) D Vega Hernández	3	4
