= Doumen =

Doumen may refer to:

- Doumen District, in Zhuhai, Guangdong, China
- François Doumen (born 1940), French racehorse trainer
- Gert Doumen (born 1971), Belgian football goalkeeper

== See also ==
- Domen (disambiguation)
