= 2021 Biella Challenger VII – Singles =

Singles
- 2021 Biella Challenger VII

Final
- Champion: (Denmark) Holger Rune
- Runner-up: (Argentina) Marco Trungelliti
- Score: 6–3, 5–7, 7–6^{(7–5)}

Events
Singles	Doubles
← 2021 ·	Biella Challenger	· 2025 →

Thanasi Kokkinakis was the defending champion but chose not to defend his title.

Holger Rune won the title after defeating Marco Trungelliti 6–3, 5–7, 7–6^{(7–5)} in the final.

== Seeds ==
1. (Peru) Juan Pablo Varillas (second round)
2. (Serbia) Nikola Milojević (second round)
3. (Germany) Daniel Altmaier (first round)
4. (Serbia) Danilo Petrović (first round, retired)
5. (Portugal) Frederico Ferreira Silva (second round)
6. (Poland) Kacper Żuk (quarterfinals)
7. (Slovakia) Martin Kližan (second round)
8. (Italy) Lorenzo Giustino (second round)

== Draw ==
Key

- Q = Qualifier
- WC = Wild card
- LL = Lucky loser
- Alt = Alternate
- ITF = ITF entry
- PR = Protected ranking
- SR = Special ranking
- SE = Special exempt
- JE = Junior exempt
- JR = Junior Accelerator Programme entrant
- CO = College Accelerator Programme entrant
- NG = Next Gen Accelerator Program entrant
- w/o = Walkover
- r = Retired
- d = Defaulted

=== Finals ===
Semifinals
(Brazil) Felipe Meligeni Alves	3	6	3
(Argentina) Marco Trungelliti	6	3	6
SE	(Denmark) Holger Rune	7	2	6
(Argentina) Tomás Martín Etcheverry	5	6	2

Final
(Argentina) Marco Trungelliti	3	7	6^{5}
SE	(Denmark) Holger Rune	6	5	7^{7}

=== Top half ===
First round
1	(Peru) JP Varillas	6	6
(Czech Republic) Z Kolář	3	1
(Argentina) R Olivo	6	6
(Brazil) J Menezes	4	3
(Italy) R Marcora	3	1
(Brazil) F Meligeni Alves	6	6
(Argentina) A Collarini	5	6	4
7	(Slovakia) M Kližan	7	2	6
4	(Serbia) D Petrović	1	0^{r}
Q	(Italy) J Berrettini	6	2
(India) R Ramanathan	6	6
(Slovenia) B Kavčič	1	1
(Argentina) M Trungelliti	6	6
Q	(France) H Grenier	0	2
WC	(Italy) L Nardi	6	4	1^{r}
8	(Italy) L Giustino	2	6	4

Second round
1	(Peru) JP Varillas	3	6^{1}
(Argentina) R Olivo	6	7^{7}
(Brazil) F Meligeni Alves	6	6
7	(Slovakia) M Kližan	2	4
Q	(Italy) J Berrettini	5	6	6
(India) R Ramanathan	7	1	4
(Argentina) M Trungelliti	6	6
8	(Italy) L Giustino	4	2

Quarterfinals
(Argentina) R Olivo	3	3
(Brazil) F Meligeni Alves	6	6
Q	(Italy) J Berrettini	5	3
(Argentina) M Trungelliti	7	6

Semifinals
(Brazil) F Meligeni Alves	3	6	3
(Argentina) M Trungelliti	6	3	6

=== Bottom half ===
First round
5	(Portugal) F Ferreira Silva	6	7
(Canada) S Diez	3	5
(France) A Müller	6	6
WC	(Italy) S Napolitano	4	1
SE	(Portugal) G Elias	1	6	6
WC	(Italy) F Cobolli	6	3	4
SE	(Denmark) H Rune	6	6^{4}	7^{7}
3	(Germany) D Altmaier	2	7^{7}	6^{5}
6	(Poland) K Żuk	6	6
Q	(Italy) R Brancaccio	4	2
(Italy) A Pellegrino	3	7	6
Q	(Argentina) C Ugo Carabelli	6	5	1
(France) M Janvier	6	3	0
(Argentina) TM Etcheverry	4	6	6
(Slovakia) L Lacko	2	3
2	(Serbia) N Milojević	6	6

Second round
5	(Portugal) F Ferreira Silva	6	6^{3}	2
(France) A Müller	3	7^{7}	6
SE	(Portugal) G Elias	3	6^{3}
SE	(Denmark) H Rune	6	7^{7}
6	(Poland) K Żuk	7	7
(Italy) A Pellegrino	5	5
(Argentina) TM Etcheverry	7	6
2	(Serbia) N Milojević	5	3

Quarterfinals
(France) A Müller	4	4
SE	(Denmark) H Rune	6	6
6	(Poland) K Żuk	4	3
(Argentina) TM Etcheverry	6	6

Semifinals
SE	(Denmark) H Rune	7	2	6
(Argentina) TM Etcheverry	5	6	2
