= 2021 Biella Challenger VII =

- Date: 31 May – 6 June 2021
- Edition: 16th
- Surface: Clay
- Location: Biella, Italy

Champions

Singles
- (Denmark) Holger Rune

Doubles
- (Argentina) Tomás Martín Etcheverry / (Argentina) Renzo Olivo
← 2021 ·	Biella Challenger	· 2025 →

The 2021 Biella Challenger VII was a professional tennis tournament played on outdoor red clay courts. It was part of the 2021 ATP Challenger Tour. It took in Biella, Italy between 31 May and 6 June 2021.

== Singles main-draw entrants ==
=== Seeds ===
Country	Player	Rank^{1}	Seed
PER	Juan Pablo Varillas	130	1
SRB	Nikola Milojević	140	2
GER	Daniel Altmaier	145	3
SRB	Danilo Petrović	165	4
POR	Frederico Ferreira Silva	168	5
POL	Kacper Żuk	173	6
SVK	Martin Kližan	176	7
ITA	Lorenzo Giustino	178	8

- Rankings are as of 24 May 2021.

=== Other entrants ===
The following players received wildcards into the singles main draw:

- (Italy) Flavio Cobolli
- (Italy) Stefano Napolitano
- (Italy) Luca Nardi

The following players received entry into the singles main draw as special exempts:

- (Portugal) Gastão Elias
- (Denmark) Holger Rune

The following players received entry from the qualifying draw:

- (Italy) Jacopo Berrettini
- (Italy) Raúl Brancaccio
- (France) Hugo Grenier
- (Argentina) Camilo Ugo Carabelli

== Champions ==
=== Singles ===
- (Denmark) Holger Rune def. (Argentina) Marco Trungelliti 6–3, 5–7, 7–6^{(7–5)}.

=== Doubles ===
- (Argentina) Tomás Martín Etcheverry / (Argentina) Renzo Olivo def. (Venezuela) Luis David Martínez / (Spain) David Vega Hernández 3–6, 6–3, [10–8].
