= 2021 Biella Challenger VII – Doubles =

Doubles
- 2021 Biella Challenger VII

Final
- Champions: (Argentina) Tomás Martín Etcheverry (Argentina) Renzo Olivo
- Runners-up: (Venezuela) Luis David Martínez (Spain) David Vega Hernández
- Score: 3–6, 6–3, [10–8]

Events
| Singles | Doubles |
| ← 2021 · | Biella Challenger | · 2025 → |

Evan King and Julian Lenz were the defending champions but only King chose to defend his title, partnering Jan Zieliński. King lost in the first round to Franco Agamenone and Omar Giacalone.

Tomás Martín Etcheverry and Renzo Olivo won the title after defeating Luis David Martínez and David Vega Hernández 3–6, 6–3, [10–8] in the final.

== Seeds ==
1. (Brazil) Rafael Matos / (Brazil) Felipe Meligeni Alves (first round, withdrew)
2. (Venezuela) Luis David Martínez / (Spain) David Vega Hernández (final)
3. (India) Sriram Balaji / (India) Ramkumar Ramanathan (semifinals)
4. (United States) James Cerretani / (Czech Republic) Zdeněk Kolář (first round)

== Draw ==
=== Key ===
- Q = Qualifier
- WC = Wild card
- LL = Lucky loser
- Alt = Alternate
- ITF = ITF entry
- PR = Protected ranking
- SR = Special ranking
- SE = Special exempt
- JE = Junior exempt
- JR = Junior Accelerator Programme entrant
- CO = College Accelerator Programme entrant
- NG = Next Gen Accelerator Program entrant
- w/o = Walkover
- r = Retired
- d = Defaulted

First round
1 | (Brazil) R Matos (Brazil) F Meligeni Alves
(Portugal) F Ferreira Silva (Poland) K Żuk | w/o
(Argentina) A Collarini (Peru) S Galdós | 6^{6} | 4
(France) H Grenier (France) A Müller | 7^{8} | 6
4 | (United States) J Cerretani (Czech Republic) Z Kolář | 3 | 5
(Argentina) TM Etcheverry (Argentina) R Olivo | 6 | 7
(Italy) F Baldi (Italy) R Marcora | 0 | 5
(Canada) S Diez (Argentina) M Trungelliti | 6 | 7
WC | (Italy) J Berrettini (Italy) F Cobolli | 6 | 7
(Tunisia) A Dougaz (Argentina) C Ugo Carabelli | 4 | 5
WC | (Italy) M Bortolotti (Italy) L Vanni | 1 | 6^{7}
3 | (India) S Balaji (India) R Ramanathan | 6 | 7^{9}
(United States) E King (Poland) J Zieliński | 6 | 4 | [7]
WC | (Italy) F Agamenone (Italy) Omar Giacalone | 3 | 6 | [10]
(France) G Blancaneaux (France) M Janvier | 4 | 6^{4}
2 | (Venezuela) LD Martínez (Spain) D Vega Hernández | 6 | 7^{7}

Quarterfinals
(Portugal) F Ferreira Silva (Poland) K Żuk | 6 | 6
(France) H Grenier (France) A Müller | 2 | 3
(Argentina) TM Etcheverry (Argentina) R Olivo | 6 | 6
(Canada) S Diez (Argentina) M Trungelliti | 2 | 4
WC | (Italy) J Berrettini (Italy) F Cobolli | 6^{9} | 5
3 | (India) S Balaji (India) R Ramanathan | 7^{11} | 7
WC | (Italy) F Agamenone (Italy) O Giacalone
2 | (Venezuela) LD Martínez (Spain) D Vega Hernández | w/o

Semifinals
(Portugal) F Ferreira Silva (Poland) K Żuk | 1 | 3
(Argentina) TM Etcheverry (Argentina) R Olivo | 6 | 6
3 | (India) S Balaji (India) R Ramanathan | 2 | 4
2 | (Venezuela) LD Martínez (Spain) D Vega Hernández | 6 | 6

Final
(Argentina) TM Etcheverry (Argentina) R Olivo | 3 | 6 | [10]
2 | (Venezuela) LD Martínez (Spain) D Vega Hernández | 6 | 3 | [8]
