= 2026 Shymkent Challenger II – Doubles =

Doubles
- 2026 Shymkent Challenger II

Final
- Champions: (Croatia) Admir Kalender (Croatia) Mili Poljičak
- Runners-up: (Norway) Viktor Durasovic (Germany) Kai Wehnelt
- Score: 6–2, 6–7^{(7–9)}, [10–5]

Events
| Singles | Doubles |
- Shymkent Challenger

Max Hans Rehberg and Max Wiskandt were the defending champions but chose not to defend their title.

Admir Kalender and Mili Poljičak won the title after defeating Viktor Durasovic and Kai Wehnelt 6–2, 6–7^{(7–9)}, [10–5] in the final.

== Seeds ==
1. Sergey Betov / (India) Jeevan Nedunchezhiyan (semifinals)
2. (Croatia) Admir Kalender / (Croatia) Mili Poljičak (champions)
3. (Uzbekistan) Sergey Fomin / (Ukraine) Vladyslav Orlov (quarterfinals)
4. Petr Bar Biryukov / (Kazakhstan) Grigoriy Lomakin (quarterfinals)

== Draw ==
Key

- Q = Qualifier
- WC = Wild card
- LL = Lucky loser
- Alt = Alternate
- ITF = ITF entry
- PR = Protected ranking
- SR = Special ranking
- SE = Special exempt
- JE = Junior exempt
- JR = Junior Accelerator Programme entrant
- CO = College Accelerator Programme entrant
- NG = Next Gen Accelerator Program entrant
- w/o = Walkover
- r = Retired
- d = Defaulted

First round
Anton Chekhov (Uzbekistan) Maxim Shin | 6 | 6
WC | (Kazakhstan) Timur Saulenko (Kazakhstan) Arseniy Trebukhin | 4 | 2
4 | P Bar Biryukov (Kazakhstan) G Lomakin | 3 | 6 | [10]
(Japan) Tomohiro Masabayashi (Japan) N Tajima | 6 | 4 | [5]
Denis Klok (Ukraine) O Prihodko | 4 | 6 | [7]
(Norway) V Durasovic (Germany) K Wehnelt | 6 | 4 | [10]
(South Korea) G Campaña Lee (Japan) Yuki Mochizuki | 3 | 0
(Belgium) B Gadamauri (Netherlands) J Sels | 6 | 6
(Italy) A Binda; Svyatoslav Gulin | 0 | 3
3 | (Uzbekistan) S Fomin (Ukraine) V Orlov | 6 | 6
(Japan) Sora Fukuda (Japan) Leo Vithoontien | 3 | 6 | [10]
Kirill Mishkin; Vitali Shvets | 6 | 3 | [4]
(Moldova) R Albot (Kazakhstan) D Yevseyev | 5 | 3
2 | (Croatia) A Kalender (Croatia) M Poljičak | 7 | 6

Quarterfinals
1 | S Betov (India) J Nedunchezhiyan | 7^{7} | 6
A Chekhov (Uzbekistan) M Shin | 6^{2} | 2
4 | P Bar Biryukov (Kazakhstan) G Lomakin | 3 | 5
(Norway) V Durasovic (Germany) K Wehnelt | 6 | 7
(Belgium) B Gadamauri (Netherlands) J Sels | 6 | 6
3 | (Uzbekistan) S Fomin (Ukraine) V Orlov | 3 | 0
(Japan) S Fukuda (Japan) L Vithoontien | 7^{7} | 4 | [8]
2 | (Croatia) A Kalender (Croatia) M Poljičak | 6^{3} | 6 | [10]

Semifinals
1 | S Betov (India) J Nedunchezhiyan | 6 | 4 | [6]
(Norway) V Durasovic (Germany) K Wehnelt | 3 | 6 | [10]
(Belgium) B Gadamauri (Netherlands) J Sels | 5 | 5
2 | (Croatia) A Kalender (Croatia) M Poljičak | 7 | 7

Final
(Norway) V Durasovic (Germany) K Wehnelt | 2 | 7^{9} | [5]
2 | (Croatia) A Kalender (Croatia) M Poljičak | 6 | 6^{7} | [10]
