= 2026 Challenger Città di Cervia =

- Date: 18 – 23 May
- Edition: 1st
- Surface: Clay
- Location: Cervia, Italy

Champions

Singles
- (Spain) Max Alcalá Gurri

Doubles
- (Italy) Francesco Forti / (Italy) Filippo Romano
- Challenger Città di Cervia

The 2026 CAME Cup Città di Cervia was a professional tennis tournament played on clay courts. It was the first edition of the tournament which was part of the 2026 ATP Challenger Tour. It took place in Cervia, Italy between 18 and 23 May 2026.

== Singles main-draw entrants ==
=== Seeds ===
Country	Player	Rank^{1}	Seed
ITA	Andrea Guerrieri	248	1
ARG	Guido Iván Justo	263	2
USA	Stefan Dostanic	266	3
USA	Mitchell Krueger	270	4
~~URU~~	~~Franco Roncadelli~~	~~274~~	~~5~~
BEL	Buvaysar Gadamauri	280	6
ITA	Michele Ribecai	282	7
FRA	Moïse Kouamé	313	8

- ^{1} Rankings are as of 4 May 2026.

=== Other entrants ===
The following players received wildcards into the singles main draw:

- (Italy) Juan Cruz Martin Manzano
- (Italy) Lorenzo Rottoli
- (Italy) Jacopo Vasamì

The following player received entry into the singles main draw through the Junior Accelerator programme:

- (Bulgaria) Ivan Ivanov

The following player received entry into the singles main draw through the Next Gen Accelerator programme:

- (India) Manas Dhamne

The following players received entry from the qualifying draw:

- (Italy) Federico Arnaboldi
- (Italy) Tommaso Compagnucci
- (Italy) Enrico Dalla Valle
- (Italy) Francesco Forti
- (Italy) Federico Iannaccone
- (Italy) Giovanni Oradini

The following players received entry as lucky losers:

- (Italy) Lorenzo Carboni
- (Bulgaria) Petr Nesterov
- (Italy) ~~Luca Potenza~~

== Champions ==
=== Singles ===
- (Spain) Max Alcalá Gurri def. (Belgium) Buvaysar Gadamauri 2–6, 6–1, 6–1.

=== Doubles ===
- (Italy) Francesco Forti / (Italy) Filippo Romano def. (Argentina) Santiago Rodríguez Taverna / (Spain) David Vega Hernández 6–3, 6–4.
