= Domen =

Domen may refer to:

== Places ==
- Domën, a village in Kryevidh commune, Tirana county, Albania
- Dömen, Bozdoğan, a village in Bozdoğan district, Aydın province, Turkey
- Domen, Norway, a mountain in Vardø municipality, Finnmark county
- Domen Butte, a butte in the Borg Massif of Queen Maud Land, Antarctica
- Hen Domen, the site of a medieval timber motte-and-bailey castle in Powys, Wales
- Y Domen Fawr, a scheduled monument in Blaenau Gwent, Wales

== People ==
- Domen Črnigoj (born 1995), Slovenian professional football player
- Domen Lorbek (born 1985), Slovenian professional basketball player
- Domen Pociecha (born 1985), Slovenian luger
- Domen Prevc (born 1999), Slovenian ski jumper

== Other ==
- Domen, the clay masks of Jōmon Japan
- DoMEn, the company that owns the .me tlD.
