= 2025 Città di Biella – Singles =

Singles
- 2025 Città di Biella

Final
- Champion: (Italy) Stefano Napolitano
- Runner-up: (Switzerland) Kilian Feldbausch
- Score: 7–5, 6–3

Events
Singles	Doubles
- Città di Biella

Holger Rune was the defending champion but chose not to defend his title.

Stefano Napolitano won the title after defeating Kilian Feldbausch 7–5, 6–3 in the final.

== Seeds ==
1. (Italy) Stefano Travaglia (first round, withdrew)
2. (Czech Republic) Zdeněk Kolář (quarterfinals)
3. (Italy) Marco Cecchinato (second round)
4. (Switzerland) Alexander Ritschard (second round)
5. (Germany) Marko Topo (quarterfinals)
6. (Spain) Alejandro Moro Cañas (second round)
7. (Ukraine) Oleg Prihodko (second round, retired)
8. (Netherlands) Jelle Sels (quarterfinals)

== Draw ==
Key

- Q = Qualifier
- WC = Wild card
- LL = Lucky loser
- Alt = Alternate
- ITF = ITF entry
- PR = Protected ranking
- SR = Special ranking
- SE = Special exempt
- JE = Junior exempt
- JR = Junior Accelerator Programme entrant
- CO = College Accelerator Programme entrant
- NG = Next Gen Accelerator Program entrant
- w/o = Walkover
- r = Retired
- d = Defaulted

=== Finals ===
Semifinals
WC	(Italy) Stefano Napolitano	6	6
WC	(Italy) Gianluca Cadenasso	3	3
(Switzerland) Kilian Feldbausch	6	3	6
(Croatia) Luka Mikrut	3	6	4

Final
WC	(Italy) Stefano Napolitano	7	6
(Switzerland) Kilian Feldbausch	5	3

=== Top half ===
First round
1	(Italy) S Travaglia
(Italy) F Arnaboldi	w/o
WC	(Italy) S Napolitano	6	6
(Italy) E Dalla Valle	1	4
(Italy) Gabriele Pennaforti	5	6	3
Q	(Spain) P Martín Tiffon	7	4	6
LL	(Italy) Federico Iannaccone	0	0
6	(Spain) A Moro Cañas	6	6
4	(Switzerland) A Ritschard	6	4
(Germany) T Gentzsch	2	4^{r}
Q	(Italy) G Oradini	3	3
WC	(Italy) G Cadenasso	6	6
(Austria) D Novak	4	6	7
(Austria) S Kopp	6	3	5
(Ukraine) Eric Vanshelboim	3	5
8	(Netherlands) J Sels	6	7

Second round
(Italy) F Arnaboldi	2	0
WC	(Italy) S Napolitano	6	6
Q	(Spain) P Martín Tiffon	7^{8}	6
6	(Spain) A Moro Cañas	6^{6}	2
4	(Switzerland) A Ritschard	2	6	4
WC	(Italy) G Cadenasso	6	2	6
(Austria) D Novak	3	7^{7}	4
8	(Netherlands) J Sels	6	6^{5}	6

Quarterfinals
WC	(Italy) S Napolitano	6	6
Q	(Spain) P Martín Tiffon	1	2
WC	(Italy) G Cadenasso	6	6
8	(Netherlands) J Sels	4	0

Semifinals
WC	(Italy) S Napolitano	6	6
WC	(Italy) G Cadenasso	3	3

=== Bottom half ===
First round
5	(Germany) M Topo	6	6
(Italy) R Brancaccio	3	4
(Italy) G Piraino	3	4
(Latvia) R Strombachs	6	6
(Switzerland) K Feldbausch	7	6
Alt	(Italy) Alexander Weis	5	3
Q	(Belgium) B Gadamauri	1	6	6^{4}
3	(Italy) M Cecchinato	6	4	7^{7}
7	(Ukraine) O Prihodko	6	6
Q	(France) M Chazal	4	2
(Croatia) L Mikrut	6	6
Q	(Italy) Lorenzo Carboni	1	4
WC	(Italy) F Romano	6^{4}	4
(Italy) G Fonio	7^{7}	6
Q	(Serbia) Stefan Popović	5	1
2	(Czech Republic) Z Kolář	7	6

Second round
5	(Germany) M Topo	7	0	6
(Latvia) R Strombachs	5	6	3
(Switzerland) K Feldbausch	3	6	6
3	(Italy) M Cecchinato	6	1	4
7	(Ukraine) O Prihodko	4	0^{r}
(Croatia) L Mikrut	6	0
(Italy) G Fonio	6	6^{2}	1
2	(Czech Republic) Z Kolář	4	7^{7}	6

Quarterfinals
5	(Germany) M Topo	2	3
(Switzerland) K Feldbausch	6	6
(Croatia) L Mikrut	6	6
2	(Czech Republic) Z Kolář	2	1

Semifinals
(Switzerland) K Feldbausch	6	3	6
(Croatia) L Mikrut	3	6	4
