= Jaak Broekx =

Belgian centenarian

Henricus Petrus Jacobus Broekx
- Born: 6 August 1914
- Died: 31 October 2023 (aged 109)
- Occupation: Centenarian

Henricus Petrus Jacobus (Jaak) Broekx (6 August 1914 – 31 October 2023) was a Belgian centenarian. From 9 September 2021 until his death on 31 October 2023, he was the oldest living man in Belgium. He was nine months away from being a supercentenarian.

== Life ==
Jaak Broekx was born on 6 August 1914, the eldest of eight children in the city of Bree. Broekx never married and continued to live at the address of his parental home for 106 years. After this he moved to a nursing home. Shortly after his 107th birthday, he became the oldest man in Belgium. Broekx died two years later, at the age of 109. He was the oldest person in Flanders and 2nd oldest Belgian after Fernande Courtoy from Hainaut.
