= 2026 Shymkent Challenger II – Singles =

Singles
- 2026 Shymkent Challenger II

Final
- Champion: (Belgium) Buvaysar Gadamauri
- Runner-up: (India) Manas Dhamne
- Score: 7–6^{(8–6)}, 6–4

Events
| Singles | Doubles |
- Shymkent Challenger

Sergey Fomin was the defending champion but lost in the second round to Max Hans Rehberg.

Buvaysar Gadamauri won the title after defeating Manas Dhamne 7–6^{(8–6)}, 6–4 in the final.

== Seeds ==
1. (Lithuania) Edas Butvilas (semifinals)
2. Ivan Gakhov (first round)
3. (Bosnia and Herzegovina) Andrej Nedić (quarterfinals)
4. (Bulgaria) Dimitar Kuzmanov (second round)
5. (Croatia) Mili Poljičak (quarterfinals)
6. (France) Antoine Ghibaudo (semifinals)
7. (France) Sean Cuenin (first round)
8. Petr Bar Biryukov (second round)

== Draw ==
Key

- Q = Qualifier
- WC = Wild card
- LL = Lucky loser
- Alt = Alternate
- ITF = ITF entry
- PR = Protected ranking
- SR = Special ranking
- SE = Special exempt
- JE = Junior exempt
- JR = Junior Accelerator Programme entrant
- CO = College Accelerator Programme entrant
- NG = Next Gen Accelerator Program entrant
- w/o = Walkover
- r = Retired
- d = Defaulted

=== Finals ===
Semifinals
1 | (Lithuania) Edas Butvilas | 4 | 6 | 3
(Belgium) Buvaysar Gadamauri | 6 | 3 | 6
6 | (France) Antoine Ghibaudo | 4 | 3
(India) Manas Dhamne | 6 | 6

Final
(Belgium) Buvaysar Gadamauri | 7^{8} | 6
(India) Manas Dhamne | 6^{6} | 4

=== Top half ===
First round
1 | (Lithuania) E Butvilas | 6 | 6
WC | (Kazakhstan) Z Nurlanuly | 0 | 3
(Moldova) R Albot | 6 | 1 | 5
Q | (South Korea) G Campaña Lee | 2 | 6 | 7
(Uzbekistan) S Fomin | 6 | 7^{7}
(Netherlands) J Sels | 3 | 6^{5}
Q | (Germany) MH Rehberg | 7^{9} | 6
7 | (France) Sean Cuenin | 6^{7} | 2
4 | (Bulgaria) D Kuzmanov | 2 | 6 | 6
(United States) Dali Blanch | 6 | 3 | 1
(Belgium) B Gadamauri | 6 | 6
(Norway) V Durasovic | 3 | 2
WC | (Kazakhstan) A Omarkhanov | 3 | 2
(Kazakhstan) D Yevseyev | 6 | 6
Q | (Ukraine) V Orlov | 2 | 6 | 4
5 | (Croatia) M Poljičak | 6 | 2 | 6

Second round
1 | (Lithuania) E Butvilas | 7 | 6
Q | (South Korea) G Campaña Lee | 5 | 1
(Uzbekistan) S Fomin | 2 | 0
Q | (Germany) MH Rehberg | 6 | 6
4 | (Bulgaria) D Kuzmanov | 4 | 2
(Belgium) B Gadamauri | 6 | 6
(Kazakhstan) D Yevseyev | 5 | 1
5 | (Croatia) M Poljičak | 7 | 6

Quarterfinals
1 | (Lithuania) E Butvilas | 7 | 2 | 6
Q | (Germany) MH Rehberg | 5 | 6 | 3
(Belgium) B Gadamauri | 6 | 6
5 | (Croatia) M Poljičak | 0 | 1

Semifinals
1 | (Lithuania) E Butvilas | 4 | 6 | 3
(Belgium) B Gadamauri | 6 | 3 | 6

=== Bottom half ===
First round
6 | (France) A Ghibaudo | 6 | 7
Q | (Ukraine) O Krutykh | 2 | 5
(Italy) S Pieri | 6 | 6
Alt | (Germany) M Wiskandt | 4 | 1
Alt | (Poland) T Berkieta | 3 | 4
(France) Mathys Erhard | 6 | 6
Q | Svyatoslav Gulin | 0 | 0^{r}
3 | (Bosnia and Herzegovina) A Nedić | 6 | 2
8 | P Bar Biryukov | 7 | 7^{7}
Q | (Japan) Sora Fukuda | 5 | 6^{3}
(Ukraine) O Prihodko | 4 | 6^{8}
(Italy) A Binda | 6 | 7^{10}
(India) M Dhamne | 7 | 4 | 7^{10}
WC | (Uzbekistan) Nikita Belozertsev | 5 | 6 | 6^{8}
PR | (Netherlands) G Brouwer | 7^{7} | 3 | 6
2 | I Gakhov | 6^{4} | 6 | 1

Second round
6 | (France) A Ghibaudo | 5 | 6 | 6
(Italy) S Pieri | 7 | 2 | 3
(France) M Erhard | 4 | 6 | 2
3 | (Bosnia and Herzegovina) A Nedić | 6 | 2 | 6
8 | P Bar Biryukov | 7^{7} | 0 | 1
(Italy) A Binda | 6^{3} | 6 | 6
(India) M Dhamne | 6 | 6
PR | (Netherlands) G Brouwer | 1 | 1

Quarterfinals
6 | (France) A Ghibaudo | 3 | 6 | 6
3 | (Bosnia and Herzegovina) A Nedić | 6 | 4 | 0
(Italy) A Binda | 4 | 2
(India) M Dhamne | 6 | 6

Semifinals
6 | (France) A Ghibaudo | 4 | 3
(India) M Dhamne | 6 | 6
