= 2025 Città di Biella – Doubles =

Doubles
- 2025 Città di Biella

Final
- Champions: (Italy) Gianluca Cadenasso (Italy) Filippo Romano
- Runners-up: (Belgium) Buvaysar Gadamauri (Netherlands) Jelle Sels
- Score: 6–3, 7–5

Events
Singles	Doubles
- Città di Biella

Tomás Martín Etcheverry and Renzo Olivo were the defending champions but chose not to defend their title.

Gianluca Cadenasso and Filippo Romano won the title after defeating Buvaysar Gadamauri and Jelle Sels 6–3, 7–5 in the final.

== Seeds ==
1. (Argentina) Guido Andreozzi / Daniil Golubev (quarterfinals)
2. (Italy) Gianluca Cadenasso / (Italy) Filippo Romano (champions)
3. (India) Adil Kalyanpur / (India) Parikshit Somani (semifinals)
4. (Croatia) Admir Kalender / Pavel Verbin (first round)

== Draw ==
Key

- Q = Qualifier
- WC = Wild card
- LL = Lucky loser
- Alt = Alternate
- ITF = ITF entry
- PR = Protected ranking
- SR = Special ranking
- SE = Special exempt
- JE = Junior exempt
- JR = Junior Accelerator Programme entrant
- CO = College Accelerator Programme entrant
- NG = Next Gen Accelerator Program entrant
- w/o = Walkover
- r = Retired
- d = Defaulted

=== Draw ===
First round
1	(Argentina) G Andreozzi; D Golubev	w/o
WC	(Italy) G Fonio (Italy) S Napolitano
(Belgium) B Gadamauri (Netherlands) J Sels	6	6
(Italy) F Arnaboldi (Italy) Federico Iannaccone	3	3
3	(India) A Kalyanpur (India) Parikshit Somani	6	7
WC	(Italy) Andrea Cardella (Italy) Mattia Rossi	3	5
(United States) Zachary Fuchs (United States) Wally Thayne	2	6	[10]
(Italy) Massimo Giunta (Italy) Gabriele Maria Noce	6	2	[5]
(Austria) S Kopp (Italy) Alexander Weis	6^{1}	7^{9}	[10]
4	(Croatia) A Kalender; Pavel Verbin	7^{7}	6^{7}	[5]
(Italy) Simone Agostini (Italy) Lorenzo Carboni	4	2
(Italy) E Dalla Valle (Italy) G Oradini	6	6

Quarterfinals
1	(Argentina) G Andreozzi; D Golubev	5	6^{2}
(Belgium) B Gadamauri (Netherlands) J Sels	7	7^{7}
3	(India) A Kalyanpur (India) P Somani	7^{8}	4
(Serbia) Stefan Popović (Ukraine) V Uzhylovskyi	6^{6}	0^{r}
(United States) Z Fuchs (United States) W Thayne	5	4
(Austria) S Kopp (Italy) A Weis	7	6
(Italy) E Dalla Valle (Italy) G Oradini	3	6^{4}
2	(Italy) G Cadenasso (Italy) F Romano	6	7^{7}

Semifinals
(Belgium) B Gadamauri (Netherlands) J Sels	6	6
3	(India) A Kalyanpur (India) P Somani	4	4
(Austria) S Kopp (Italy) A Weis	1	2
2	(Italy) G Cadenasso (Italy) F Romano	6	6

Final
(Belgium) B Gadamauri (Netherlands) J Sels	3	5
2	(Italy) G Cadenasso (Italy) F Romano	6	7
