= Jōmon period =

Japanese prehistorical period

In Japanese history, the Jōmon period (Japanese: 縄文 時代, Hepburn: Jōmon jidai) is the time between c. 14,000 and 300 BC, during which Japan was inhabited by the Jōmon people, a diverse hunter-gatherer and early agriculturalist population united by a common culture, which reached a considerable degree of sedentism and cultural complexity. Their ancestors migrated from Northeast Asia, the Korean Peninsula, China, and Southeast Asia. Their civilization is divided into six distinct phases. They eventually admixed with the Japonic-speaking Yayoi people.

The Jōmon period was rich in tools and jewelry made from bone, stone, shell and antler; pottery figurines and vessels; and lacquerware. Jōmon pottery is noted for being decorated by having cords pressed into the wet outside of the pottery. Similar cultures developed in pre-Columbian cultures of the North American Pacific Northwest and especially the Valdivia culture in Ecuador because in these settings cultural complexity developed within a primarily hunting-gathering context with limited use of horticulture.

== Chronology ==
The approximately 14,000-year Jōmon period is conventionally divided into several phases, progressively shorter: Incipient (13,750–8,500 BC), Initial (8,500–5,000 BC), Early (5,000–3,520 BC), Middle (3,520–2,470 BC), Late (2,470–1,250 BC), and Final (1,250–500 BC). The fact that this entire period is given the same name by archaeologists should not be taken to mean that there was not considerable regional and temporal diversity. The time between the earliest Jōmon pottery and that of the more well-known Middle Jōmon period is about twice as long as the span separating the building of the Great Pyramid of Giza from the 21st century. Dating of the Jōmon sub-phases is based primarily upon ceramic typology, and to a lesser extent radiocarbon dating.

Recent findings have refined the final phase of the Jōmon period to 300 BC. The Yayoi period started between 500 and 300 BC according to radio-carbon evidence, while Yayoi styled pottery was found in a Jōmon site in northern Kyushu in 800 BC.

The Japanese archipelago can be divided into 3 regions for which the chronology of the Jōmon period or its subsequent period are applied differently: Honshu and Kyushu, Okinawa and the Ryukyu Isles, and Hokkaido and Northern Tohōku. In Okinawa and the Ryukyu Isles, the Jōmon period does not apply as the Jōmon people were mostly absent from these places. Instead, common chronology for the area uses the Shellmidden Period, or the Sakishima Prehistoric Period specifically for the island. As for Hokkaido and Northern Tohoku, the Jōmon people were replaced not by the Yayoi people like in most of Japan, such as central and southern Honshu, but by the related people of the Zoku-Jomon which ushered in the Zoku-Jōmon Period unique to the North.

== Origin and ethnogenesis ==
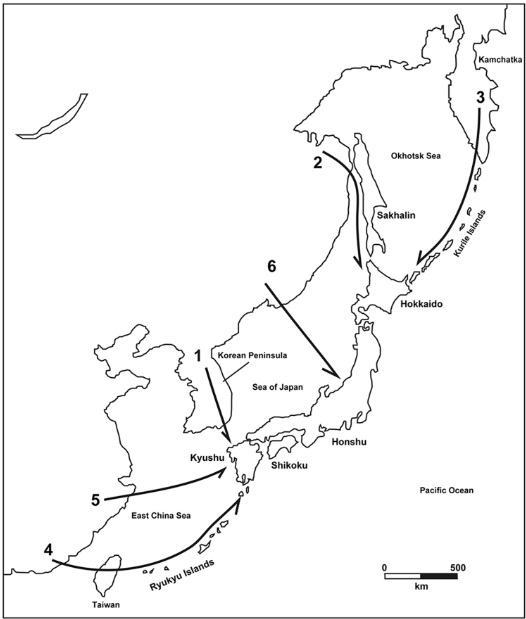
Probable migratory routes of Jōmon peoples from neighboring regions to the Japanese Archipelago.

The relationship of Jōmon people to the modern Japanese (Yamato people), Ryukyuans, and Ainu is not clear. Morphological studies of dental variation and genetic studies suggest that the Jōmon people were rather diverse, and mitochondrial DNA studies indicate the Jōmon people were closely related to modern-day East Asians. Like the Yayoi rice-agriculturalists, the Jōmon people likely came to Japan over different routes at different times and contributed to the genome of contemporary Japanese people. But overall, the ancestors of the Jōmon are believed to have come from Southeast Asia. There is also evidence of a single-wave migration by the Jōmon population to Japan, with regional differences being explained by genetic drift.

The modern-day Japanese population carries approximately 30% paternal ancestry from the Jōmon. This is far higher than the maternal Jōmon contribution of around 15%, and autosomal contribution of 10% to the Japanese population. This imbalanced inheritance has been referred to as the "admixture paradox", and is thought to hold clues as to how the admixture between the Jōmon and Yayoi cultures took place. According to Mitsuru Sakiya the Jōmon people are an admixture of several Paleolithic populations. He suggests that Y-chromosome haplogroups C1a1 and D-M55 are two of the Jōmon lineages. Recent studies suggest that D-M55 became dominant during the late Jōmon period, shortly before the arrival of the Yayoi, suggesting a population boom and bust. The maternal haplogroups M7a, N9b, and G1b have been identified from ancient Jōmon specimens.

The Jōmon period population of Hokkaido consisted of two distinctive populations which later merged to form the proto-Ainu in northern Hokkaido. The Ainu language can be connected to an "Okhotsk component" which spread southwards. They further concluded that the "dual structure theory" regarding the population history of Japan must be revised and that the Jōmon people had more diversity than originally suggested.

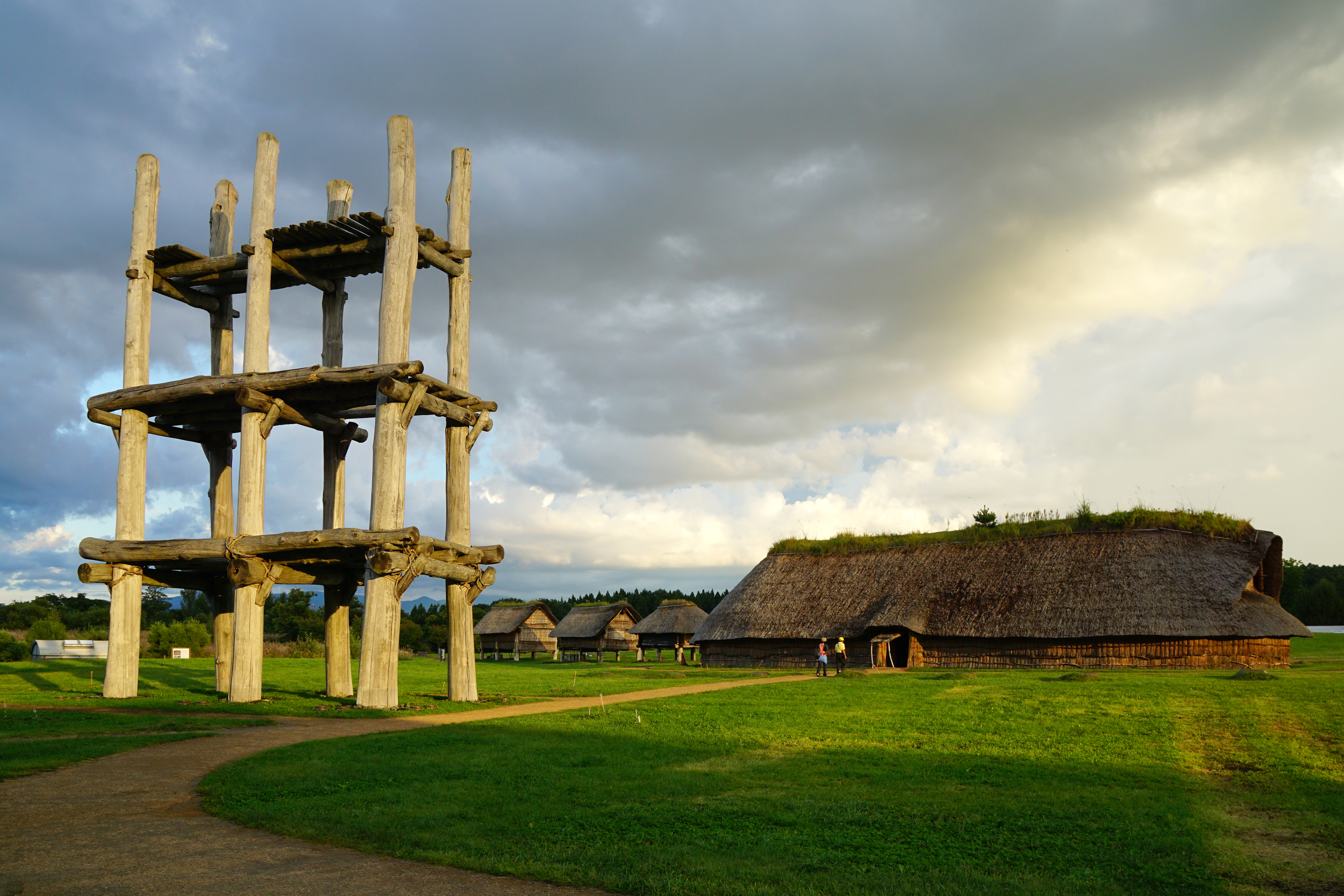
Reconstruction of the Sannai-Maruyama Site in the Aomori Prefecture. It shares cultural similarities with settlements of Northeast Asia and the Korean Peninsula, as well as with later Japanese culture.

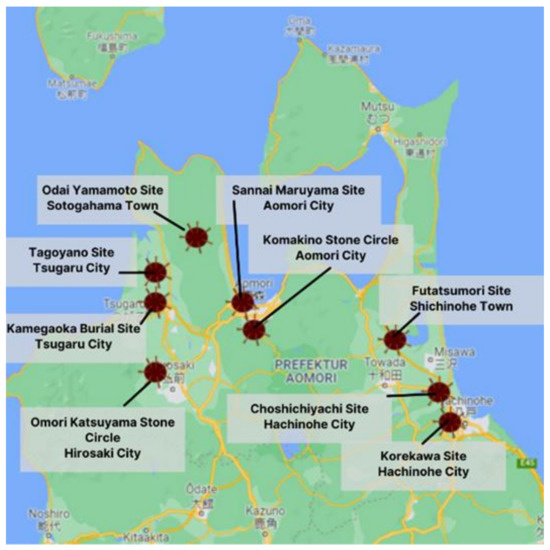
Jomon archaeological sites in Aomori Prefecture

A 2015 study found specific gene alleles, related to facial structure and features among some Ainu individuals, which largely descended from local Hokkaido Jōmon groups. These alleles are typically associated with Europeans but absent from other East Asians (including Japanese people), which suggests geneflow from a currently unidentified source population into the Jōmon period population of Hokkaido. Although these specific alleles can explain the unusual physical appearance of certain Ainu individuals, compared to other Northeast Asians, the exact origin of these alleles remains unknown. Matsumura et al. (2019), however, states that these phenotypes were shared by prehistoric populations from China and Southeast Asia. Other studies suggest relative phenotypic homogeneity among different Jōmon specimens in Japan.

Full genome analyses in 2020 and 2021 revealed further information regarding the origin of the Jōmon peoples. The genetic results suggest early admixture between different groups in Japan already during the Paleolithic, followed by constant geneflow from coastal East Asian groups, resulting in a heterogeneous population which then homogenized until the arrival of the Yayoi people. Geneflow from Northeast Asia during the Jōmon period is associated with the C1a1 and C2 lineages whilst geneflow from the Tibetan Plateau and Southern China is associated with the D1a2a (previously D1b) and D1a1 (previously D1a) lineages. Geneflow from ancient Siberia into the northern Jōmon people of Hokkaido was also detected, with later geneflow from Hokkaido into parts of northern Honshu (Tohoku). The lineages K and F are suggested to have been presented during the early Jōmon period but got replaced by C and D. The analysis of a Jōmon sample (Ikawazu shell-mound, Tahara, Japan) and an ancient sample from the Tibetan Plateau (Chokhopani, China) found only partially shared ancestry, pointing towards a "positive genetic bottleneck" regarding the spread of haplogroup D from ancient "East Asian Highlanders" (related to modern day Tujia people, Yao people, and Tibetans, as well as Tripuri people). The genetic evidence suggests that an East Asian source population, near the Himalayan mountain range, contributed ancestry to the Jōmon period population of Japan, and less to ancient Southeast Asians. This points to an inland migration through southern or central China towards Japan during the Paleolithic. Another ancestry component seem to have arrived from Siberia into Hokkaido. Archeological and biological evidence link the southern Jōmon culture of Kyushu, Shikoku and parts of Honshu to cultures of southern China and Northeast India. A common culture, known as the "broadleafed evergreen forest culture", ranged from southwestern Japan through southern China towards Northeast India and southern Tibet, and was characterized by the cultivation of Azuki beans.

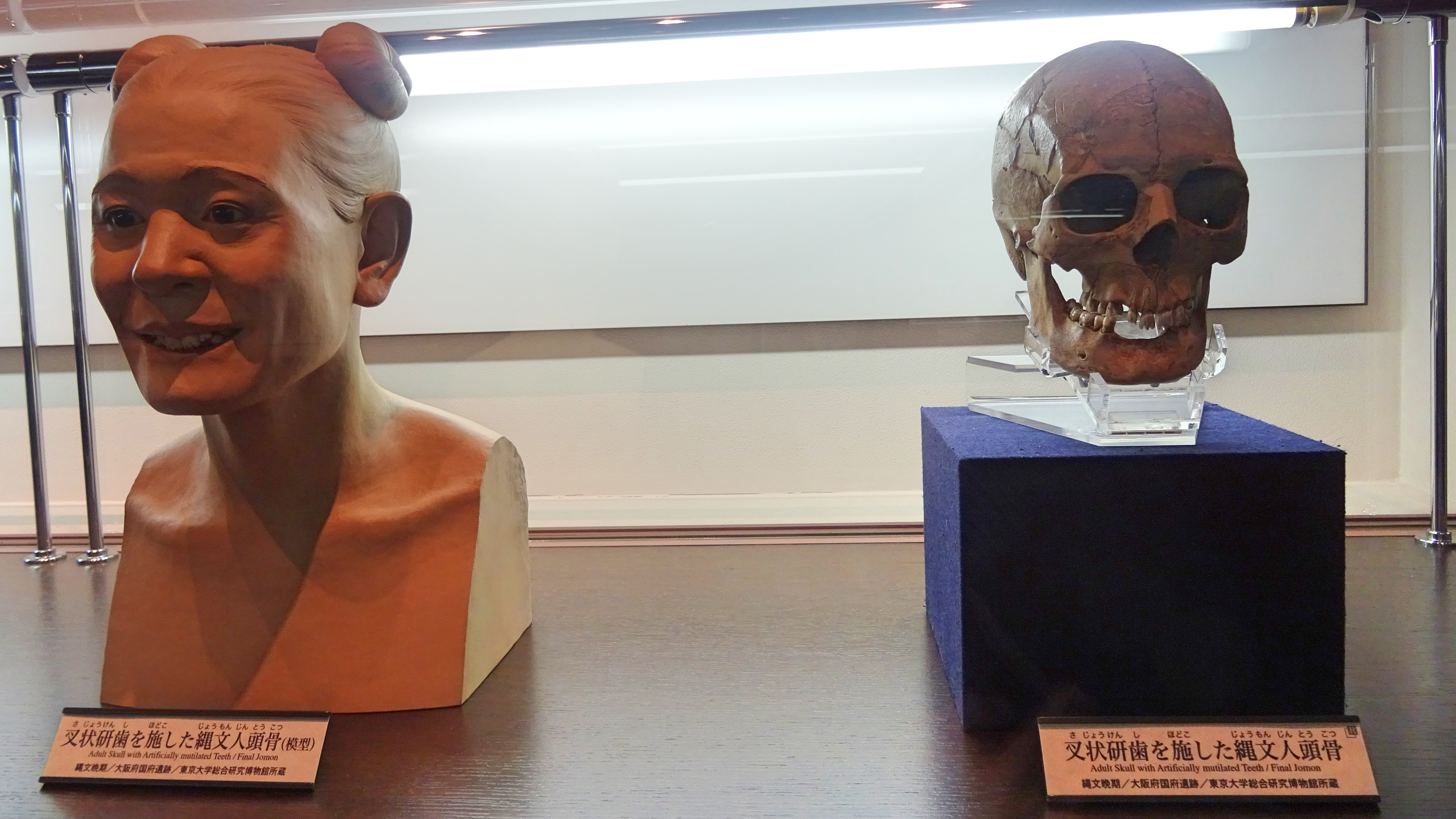
Forensic reconstruction from a local Niigata Jōmon sample

Some linguists suggest that the Japonic languages were already present within the Japanese archipelago and coastal Korea, before the Yayoi period, and can be linked to one of the Jōmon populations of southwestern Japan, rather than the later Yayoi or Kofun period rice-agriculturalists. Japonic-speakers then expanded during the Yayoi period, assimilating the newcomers, adopting rice-agriculture, and fusing mainland Asian technologies with local traditions.

Linguistics research based on specific Austronesian vocabulary loaned into the core vocabulary of (Insular) Japanese indicates Austronesian peoples were in the Japanese archipelago during the Jōmon period. These Austronesian-speakers arrived in Japan during the Jōmon period and prior to the arrival of Yayoi period migrants, associated with the spread of Japonic languages. These Austronesian-speakers were subsequently assimilated into the Japanese ethnicity. Evidence for non-Ainuic, non-Austronesian, and non-Korean loanwords are found among Insular Japonic languages, and probably derived from unknown and extinct Jōmon languages.

Other studies suggest that the Jōmon form a clade with Ancient Northern and Southern East Asians. They diverged from Ancient East Asians around the same time as the Longlin specimen from Guangxi, China although other studies show an earlier divergence date for the latter. The Jōmon likewise diverged from Ancient East Asians much later than the basal Xingyi_EN lineage. According to Wang et al. (2025), the ancestors of Ancient East Asians were a mixture of Tianyuan-related and Xingyi_EN-related lineages. The Jōmon also exhibit a high degree of genetic homogeneity,which is attributed to "strong bottleneck and small effective population size". Additional admixture between the Jōmon and coastal East Asians is also present although there is no evidence of Austronesian-related input, for instance, in the Jōmon, including Ryukyuan Jōmon.

== Incipient and Initial Jōmon (13,750–5,000 BC) ==
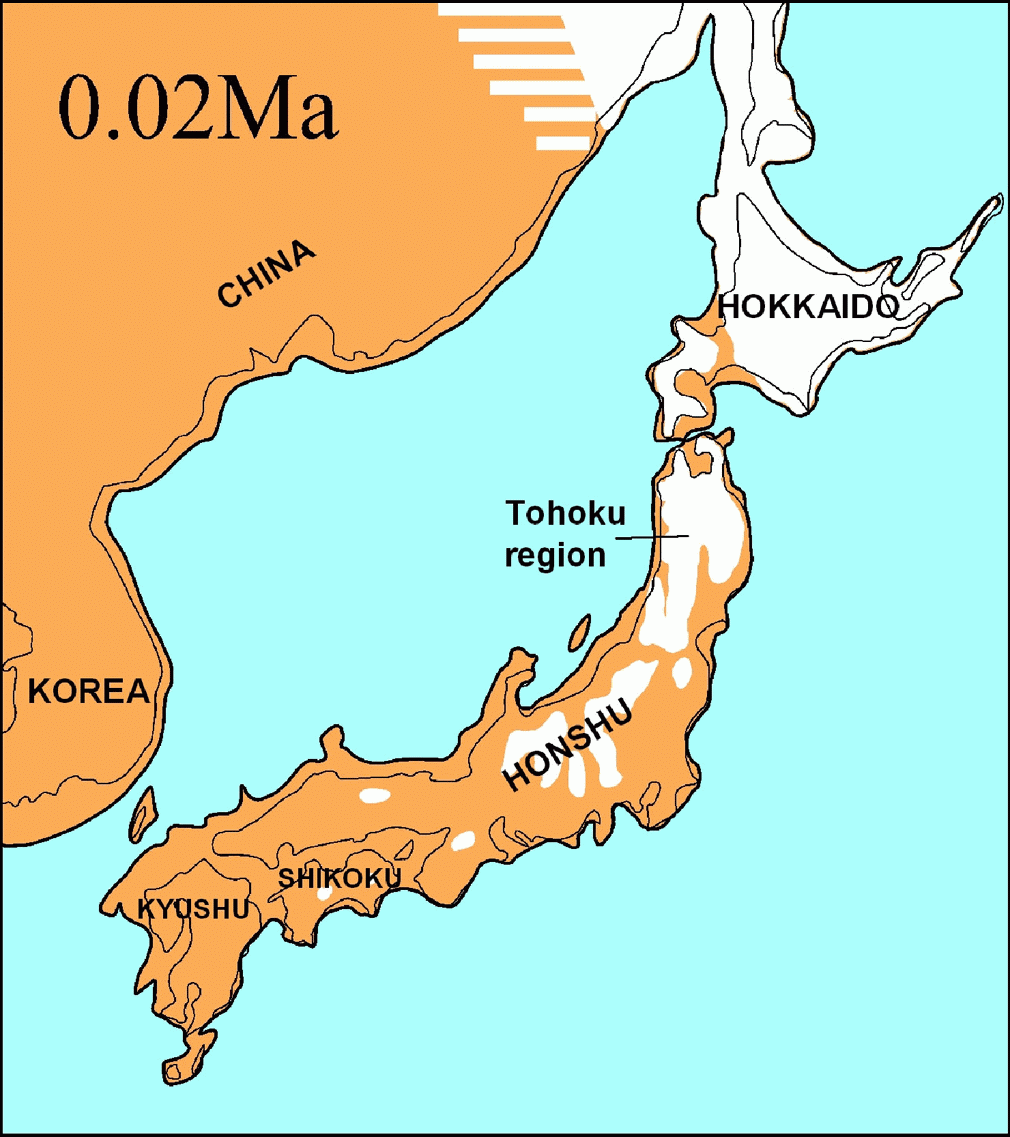
The Japanese archipelago, during the last glaciation in around 20,000 BC. Orange colored areas are regions above sea level, white areas are unvegetated, blue areas are ocean.

The earliest "Incipient Jōmon" phase began while Japan was still linked to continental Asia as a narrow peninsula. As the glaciers melted following the end of the last glacial period (approximately 12,000 BC), sea levels rose, separating the Japanese archipelago from the Asian mainland; the closest point (in Kyushu) about 190 km (120 mi) from the Korean Peninsula is near enough to be intermittently influenced by continental developments, but far enough removed for the peoples of the Japanese islands to develop independently. The main connection between the Japanese archipelago and Mainland Asia was through the Korean Peninsula to Kyushu and Honshu. In addition, Luzon, Taiwan, Ryukyu, and Kyushu constitute a continuous chain of islands, connecting the Jōmon with Southeast Asia, while Honshu, Hokkaido and Sakhalin connected the Jōmon with Siberia.

Within the archipelago, the vegetation was transformed by the end of the Ice Age. In southwestern Honshu, Shikoku, and Kyushu, broadleaf evergreen trees dominated the forests, whereas broadleaf deciduous trees and conifers were common in northeastern Honshu and southern Hokkaido. Many native tree species, such as beeches, buckeyes, chestnuts, and oaks produced edible nuts and acorns. These provided substantial sources of food for both humans and other animals. These nuts were preserved in winter, especially in the eastern part of Japan, and were stored in underground pits. The acorns of Quercus crispula and other species contain astringent tannins and cannot be eaten raw. It is believed the Jōmon cultures utilized cold-water leaching, similar to later populations in the region as well as other acorn-consuming prehistoric societies in Korea, China, and the Americas.

In the northeast, the plentiful marine life carried south by the Oyashio Current, especially salmon, was another major food source. Settlements along both the Sea of Japan and the Pacific Ocean subsisted on immense amounts of shellfish, leaving distinctive middens (mounds of discarded shells and other refuse) that are now prized sources of information for archaeologists. Other food sources meriting special mention include Sika deer, wild boar (with possible wild-pig management), wild plants such as yam-like tubers, and freshwater fish. Supported by the highly productive deciduous forests and an abundance of seafood, the population was concentrated in Honshu and Kyushu, but Jōmon sites range from Hokkaido to the Ryukyu Islands.

== Early Jōmon (5000–3520 BC) ==
The Early Jōmon period saw an explosion in population, as indicated by the number of larger aggregated villages from this period. This period occurred during the Holocene climatic optimum, when the local climate became warmer and more humid.

=== Early agriculture ===
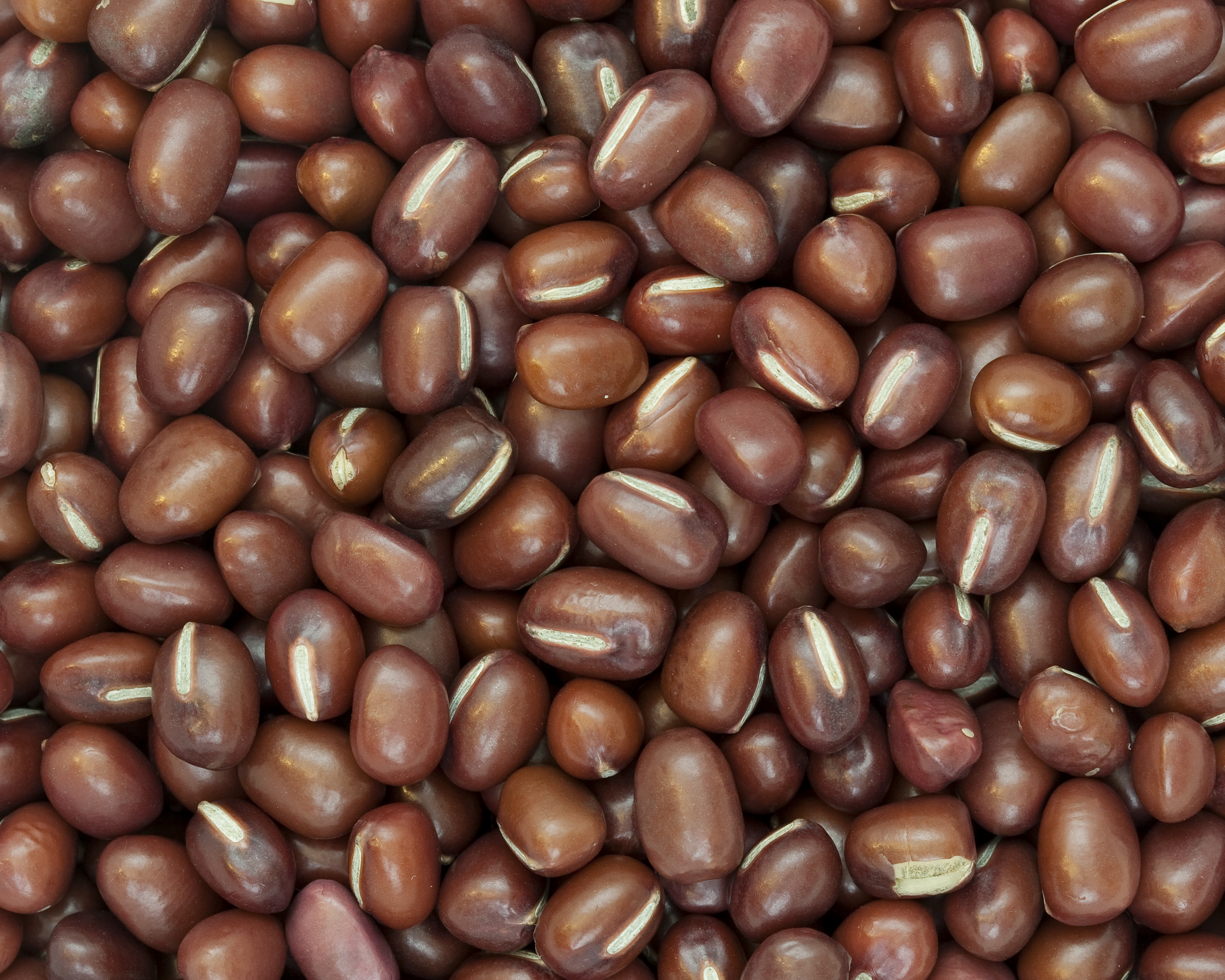
Azuki bean cultivation was common in southern Jōmon period Japan and also in southern China and Bhutan.

The degree to which horticulture or small-scale agriculture was practiced by Jōmon people is debated. Currently, there is no scientific consensus to support a conceptualization of Jōmon period culture as only hunter-gatherer. There is evidence to suggest that arboriculture was practiced in the form of tending groves of lacquer (Toxicodendron verniciflua) and chestnut (Castanea crenata and Aesculus turbinata) producing trees, as well as soybean, bottle gourd, hemp, Perilla, adzuki, among others. These characteristics place them somewhere in between hunting-gathering and agriculture.

An apparently domesticated variety of peach appeared very early at Jōmon sites in 6700–6400 BP (4700–4400 BC). This was already similar to modern cultivated forms. This domesticated type of peach was apparently brought into Japan from China. Although the domestication of wild peaches started in China long before this period, a variety closest to our modern peaches is currently attested in China itself only at a later date of 5300–4300 BP.

Evidence of plant domestication by the Jōmon people came from a genomic study of the adzuki bean. All present-day adzuki cultivars descended from the wild adzuki in eastern Japan, at about 3000–5000 BP. Mutations conferring key domestication syndromes also had a single origin in Japan. These mutations originated and continued to increase in frequency since about 10,000 BP, suggesting that domestication syndromes were being selected much earlier than clear archaeological traces of large-scale cultivation.

== Middle Jōmon (3520–2470 BC) ==
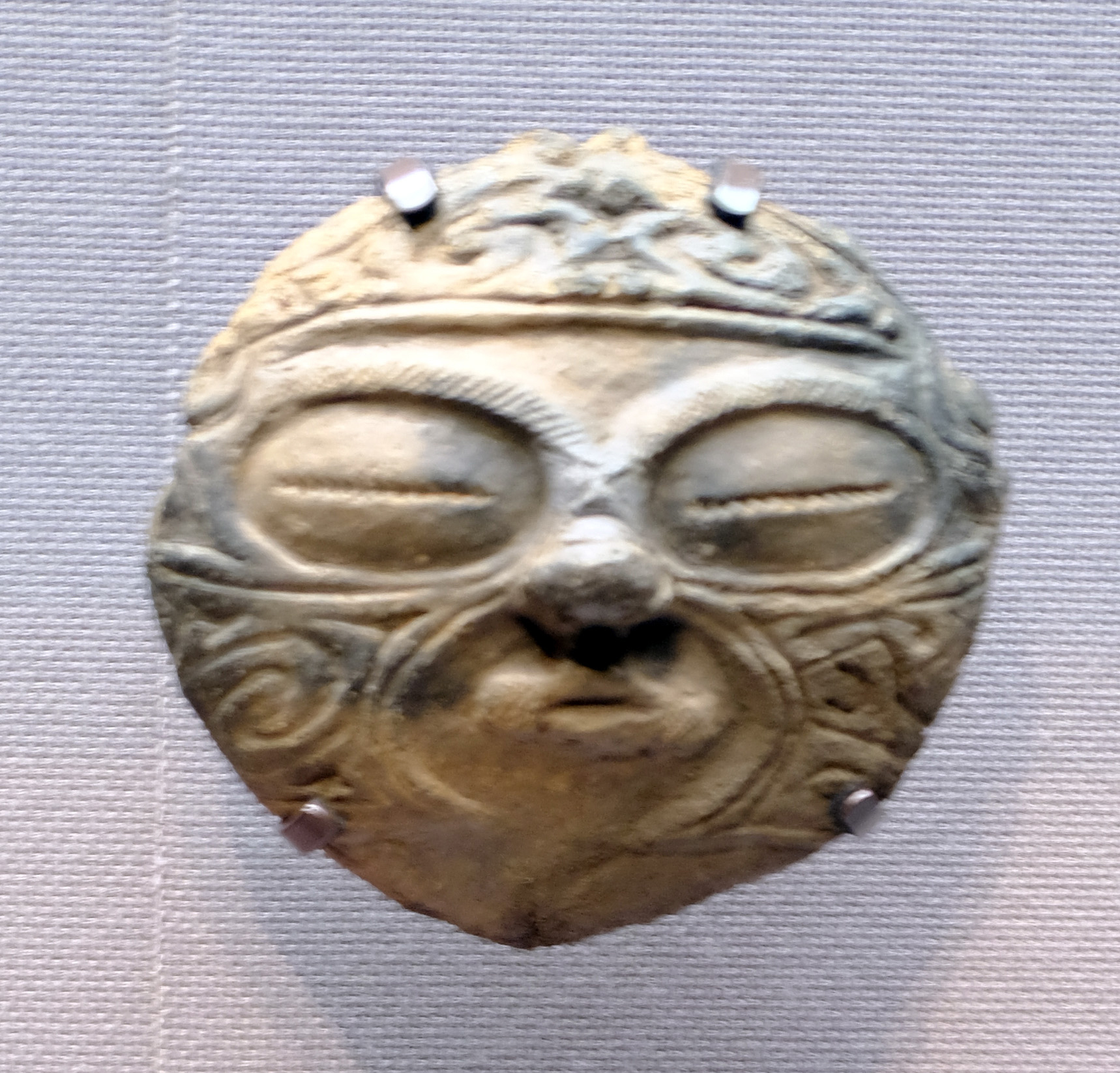
Jōmon domen clay mask, bearing similarities to clay masks found in the Amur region

Highly ornate pottery dogū figurines and vessels, such as the so-called "flame style" vessels, and lacquered wood objects remain from that time. Although the ornamentation of pottery increased over time, the ceramic fabric always remained quite coarse. During this time magatama curved stone beads make a transition from being a common jewelry item found in homes into serving as a grave goods. This is a period where there are large burial mounds and monuments.

This period saw a rise in complexity in the design of pit-houses, the most commonly used method of housing at the time, with some even having paved stone floors. A study in 2015 found that this form of dwelling continued up until the Satsumon culture. Using archaeological data on pollen count, this phase is the warmest of all the phases. By the end of this phase the warm climate starts to enter a cooling trend.

== Late and Final Jōmon (2470–500 BC) ==
After 1500 BC, the climate cooled entering a stage of neoglaciation, and populations seem to have contracted dramatically. Comparatively few archaeological sites can be found after 1500 BCE.

The Japanese chestnut, Castanea crenata, becomes essential, not only as a nut bearing tree, but also because it was extremely durable in wet conditions and became the most used timber for building houses during the Late Jōmon phase.

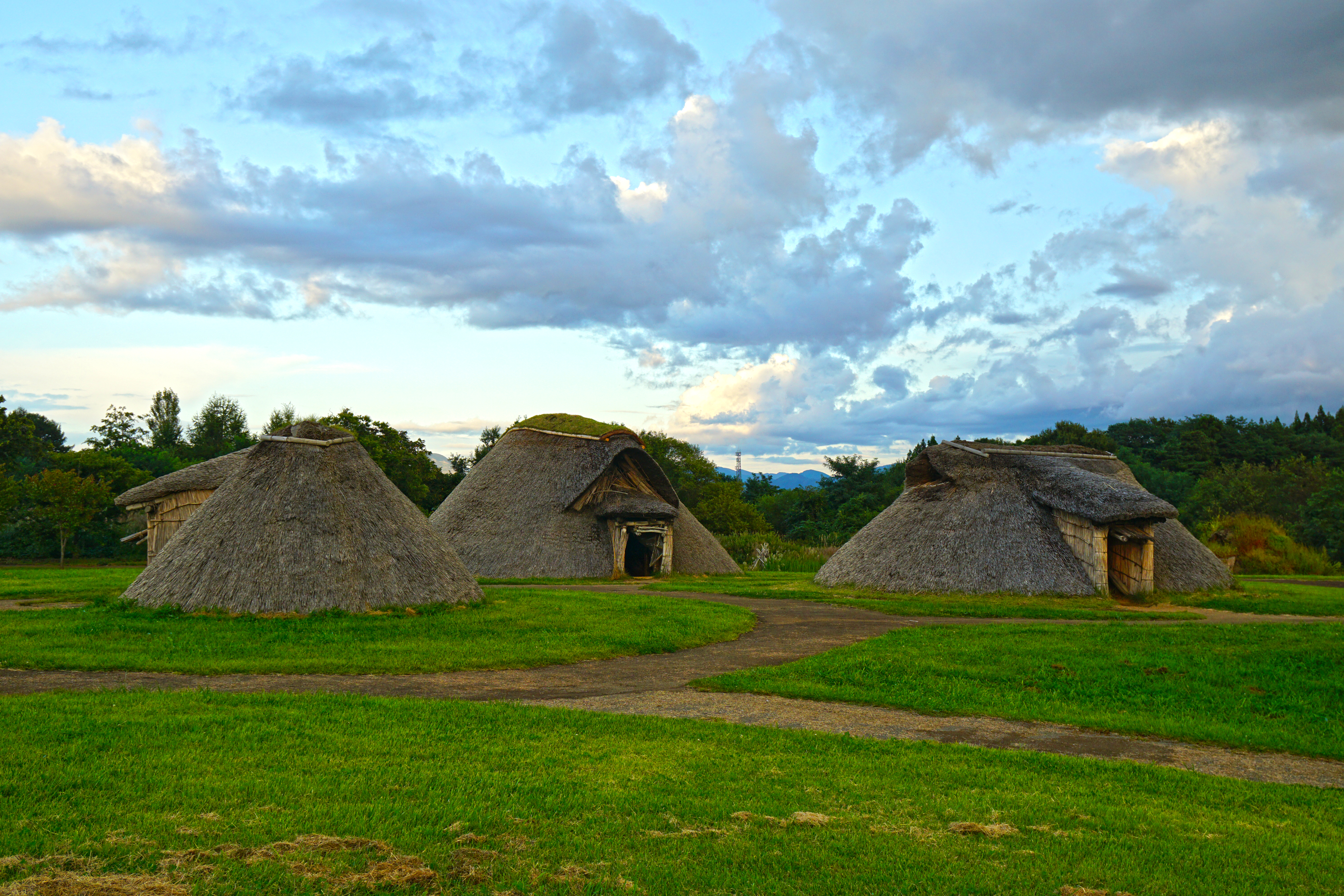
Reconstruction of Jōmon period houses in the Aomori Prefecture

During the Final Jōmon period, a slow shift was taking place in western Japan: steadily increasing contact with the Korean Peninsula eventually led to the establishment of Korean-type settlements in western Kyushu, beginning around 900 BC. The settlers brought with them new technologies such as wet rice farming and bronze and iron metallurgy, as well as new pottery styles similar to those of the Mumun pottery period. The settlements of these new arrivals seem to have coexisted with those of the Jōmon and Yayoi for around a thousand years.

Outside Hokkaido, the Final Jōmon is succeeded by a new farming culture, the Yayoi (c. 300 BC– AD 300), named after an archaeological site near Tokyo. Within Hokkaido, the Jōmon is succeeded by the Okhotsk culture and Zoku-Jōmon (post-Jōmon) or Epi-Jōmon culture, which later replaced or merged with the Satsumon culture around the 7th century.

=== Population decline ===
At the end of the Jōmon period the local population declined sharply. Scientists suggest that this was possibly caused by food shortages and other environmental problems. They concluded that not all Jōmon groups suffered under these circumstances but the overall population declined. Examining the remains of the people who lived throughout the Jōmon period, there is evidence that these deaths were not inflicted by warfare or violence on a large enough scale to cause these deaths.

== Pottery ==
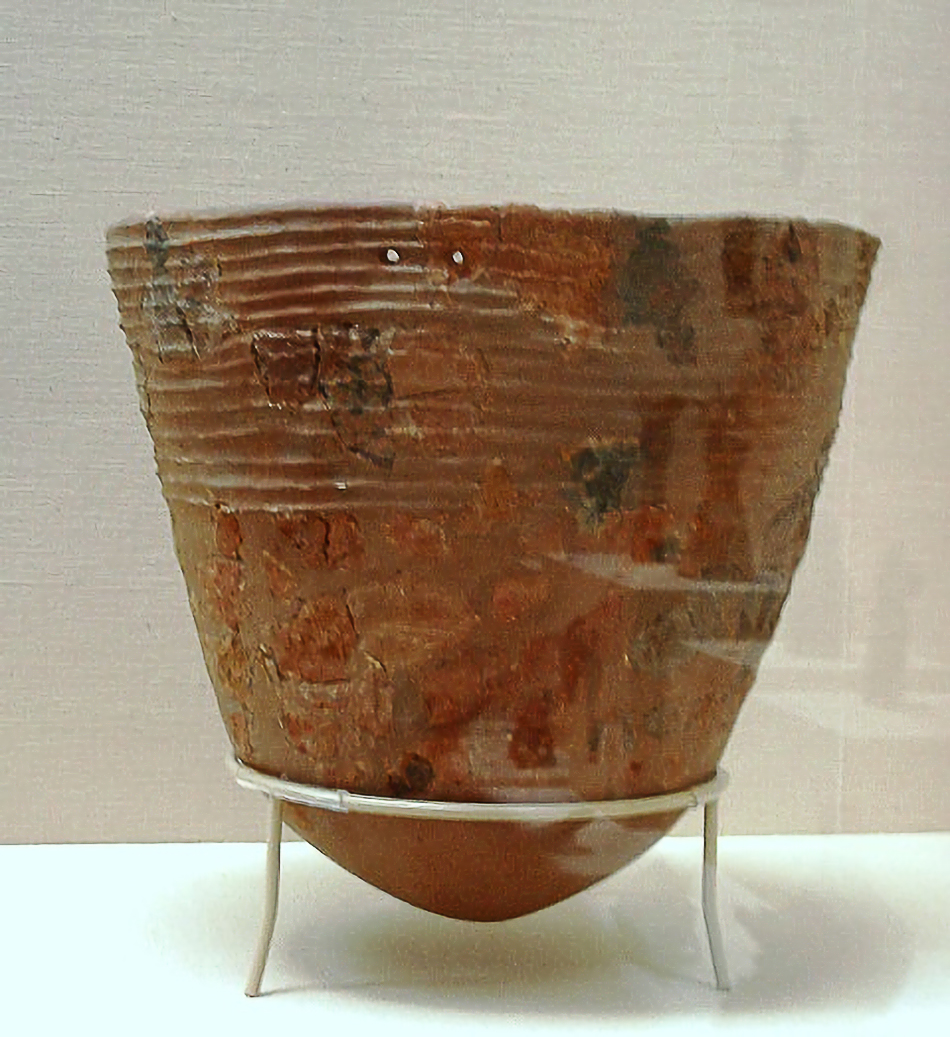
Incipient Jōmon pottery (14th–8th millennium BCE) Tokyo National Museum, Japan

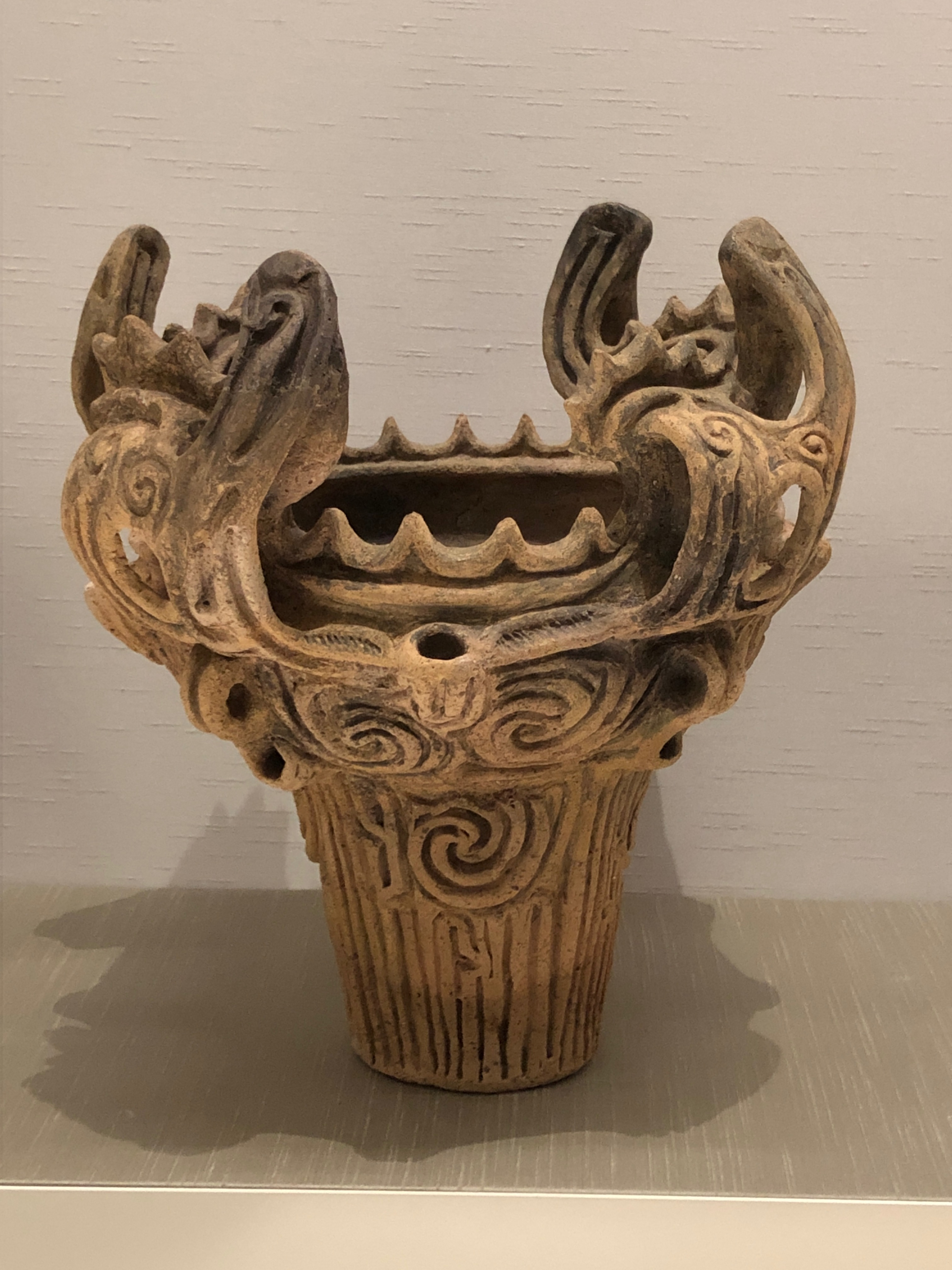
Jomon flame-style pottery, 3,000 BCE, excavated at the Iwanohara site, Niigata Prefecture

The earliest pottery in Japan was made at or before the start of the Incipient Jōmon period, as Jōmon period hunter-gatherers crafted the world’s oldest known ceramics around 14,500 BCE. Small fragments, dated to 14,500 BCE, were found at the Odai Yamamoto I site in 1998. Pottery of roughly the same age was subsequently found at other sites such as in Kamikuroiwa and the Fukui cave.

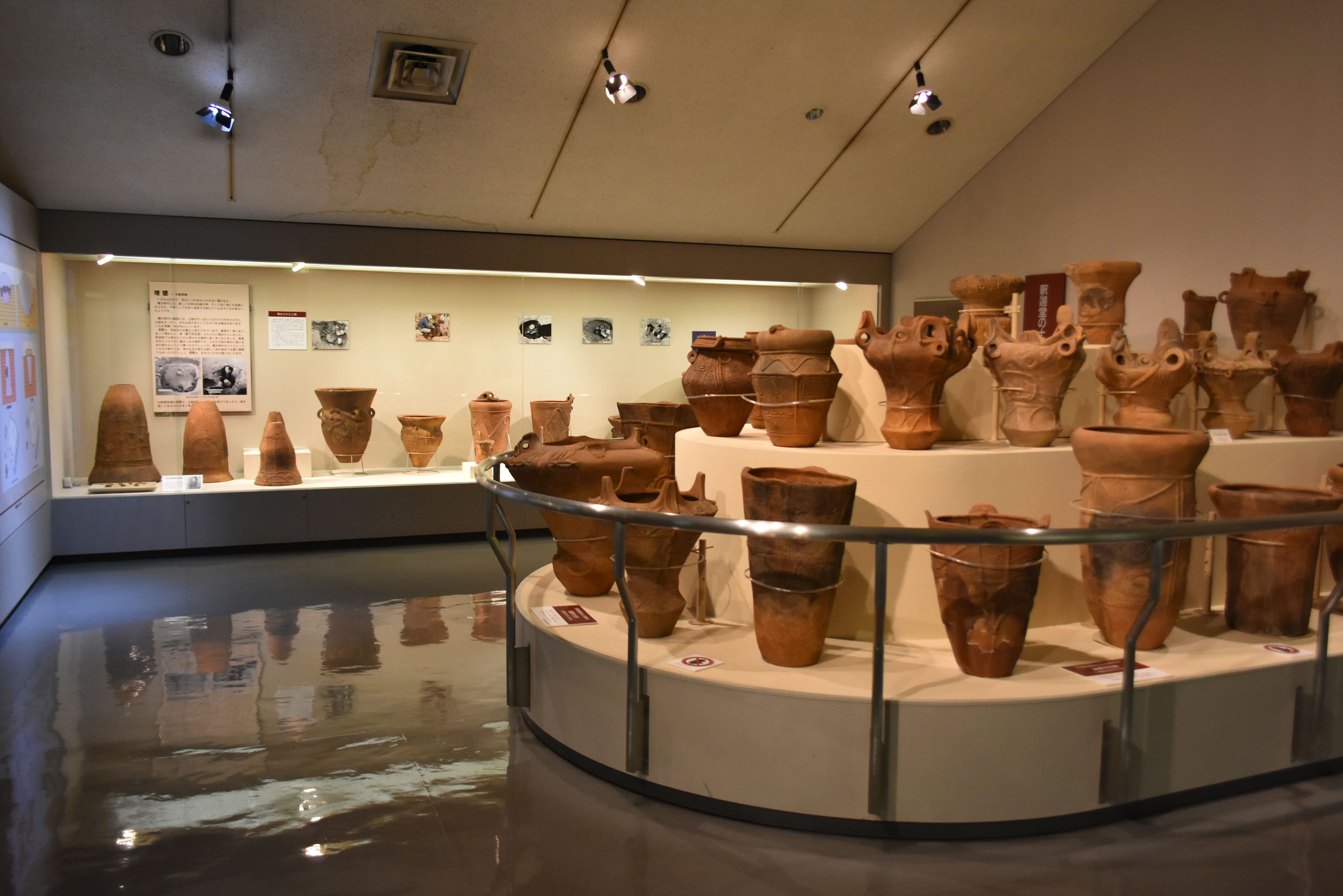
Jōmon pottery in the Yamanashi museum

The name "cord-marked" was first applied by the American zoologist and orientalist Edward S. Morse, who discovered sherds of pottery in 1877 and subsequently translated "straw-rope pattern" into Japanese as Jōmon. The pottery style characteristic of the first phases of Jōmon culture was decorated by impressing cords into the surface of wet clay and is generally accepted to be among the oldest in the world. It has now been found in a large number of sites. The pottery of the period has been classified by archaeologists into some 70 styles, with many more local varieties of style. The antiquity of Jōmon pottery was first identified after World War II, through radiocarbon dating methods. (Note: Radiocarbon measures of carbonized material from pottery artifacts (uncalibrated): Fukui Cave 12 500 ± 350 BP and 12 500 ± 500 BP Kamaki & Serizawa (1967), Kamikuroiwa rockshelter 12 165 ± 350 BP in Shikoku.) The earliest vessels were mostly smallish round-bottomed bowls 10–50 cm (3.9–20 in) high that are assumed to have been used for boiling food and, perhaps, storing it beforehand. They belonged to hunter-gatherers and the size of the vessels may have been limited by a need for portability. As later bowls increase in size, this is taken to be a sign of an increasingly settled pattern of living. These types continued to develop, with increasingly elaborate patterns of decoration, undulating rims, and flat bottoms so that they could stand on a flat surface.

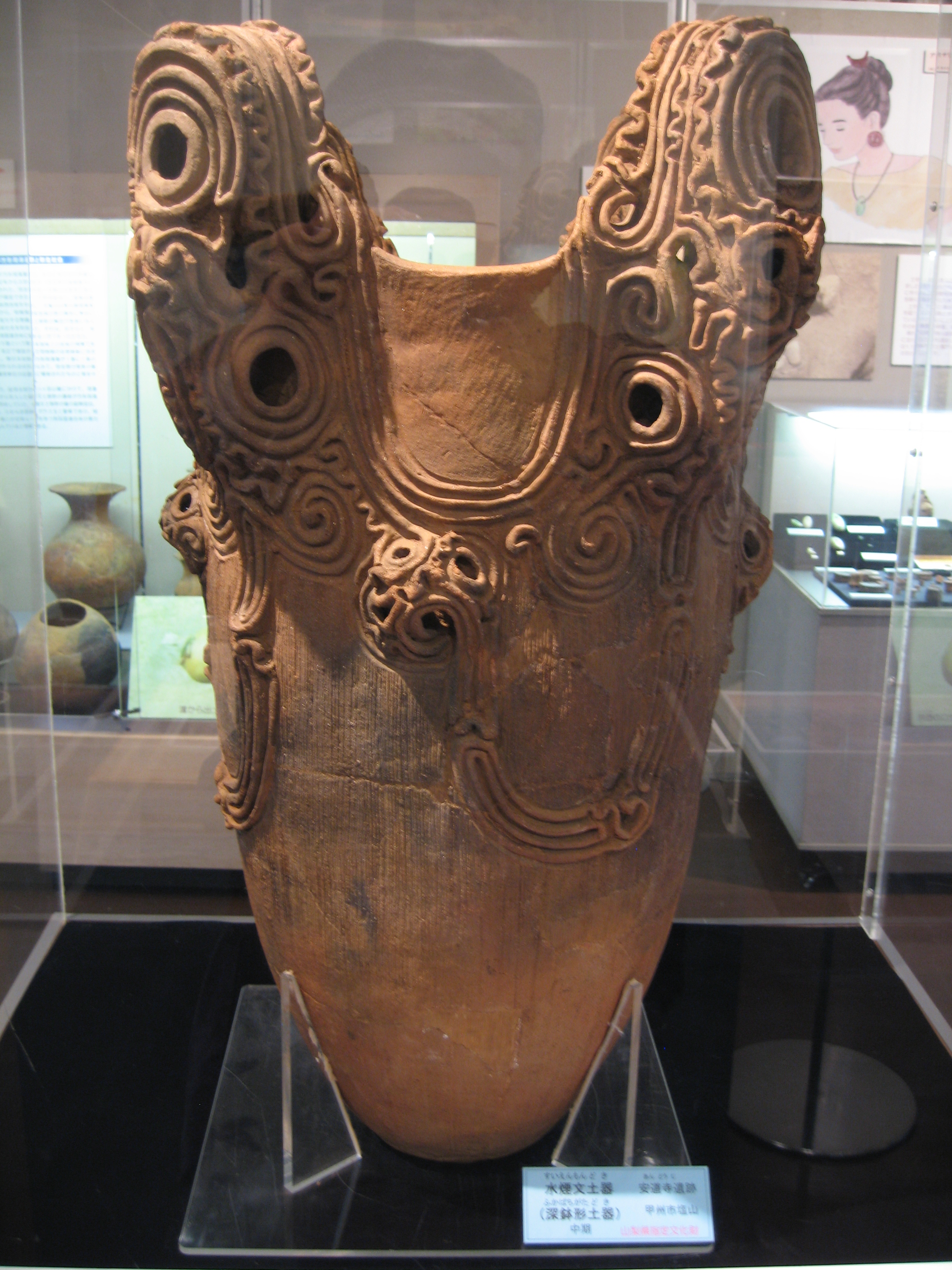
Spray style Jōmon pottery

The manufacture of pottery typically implies some form of sedentary life because pottery is heavy, bulky, and fragile and thus unsuitable for fully nomadic people. It seems that food sources were so abundant in the natural environment of the Japanese islands that they could support fairly large, semi-sedentary populations. The Jōmon people used chipped stone tools, ground stone tools, traps, and bows. They made tools and jewelry from bone, stone, shell and antler; and were evidently skillful coastal and deep-water fishers.

=== Chronological ceramic typology ===
Incipient Jōmon (14,000–7500 BCE)

- Linear applique
- Nail impression
- Cord impression
- Muroya lower

Initial Jōmon (7500–4000 BCE)

- Botasawa
- Igusa
- Inaridai
- Mito
- Nojima
- Lower Tado
- Upper Tado
- Shiboguchi
- Kayama
- Ugashima

Early Jōmon (5000–3520 BCE)

- Goryogadai
- Jūsanbodai
- Kita-Shirakawa
- Moroiso
- Okitsu
- Ukishima

Middle Jōmon (3520–2470 BCE)

- Kasori E
- Katsusaka
- Otamadai

Late Jōmon (2470–1250 BCE)

- Horinouchi
- Kasori B

Final Jōmon (1250–500 BCE)

- Angyo
- Fusenmon
- Hokurikubanki
- Kamegaoka
- Maeura
- Nagatake
- Nishihonmaken
- Nusamai
- Shimono

== Transoceanic similarities ==
Jōmon society is often compared to pre-Columbian cultures of the North American Pacific Northwest and especially to the Valdivia culture in Ecuador, including ceramics, because in these settings cultural complexity developed within a primarily hunting-gathering context with limited use of horticulture. Whether these similarities developed independently or were the result of Jōmon seafarers getting lost is debated issue.

== Foundation narratives ==
The origin narratives of Japanese civilization extend back to periods now regarded as part of the Jōmon period, but they show little or no relation to the current archaeological understanding of Jōmon culture. The traditional founding date of the Japanese nation by Emperor Jimmu is February 11, 660 BCE. That version of Japanese history, however, comes from the country's first written records, the Kojiki and the Nihon Shoki, dating from the 6th to the 8th centuries, after Japan had adopted Chinese characters (Go-on/Kan-on).

Some elements of modern Japanese culture may date from the period and reflect the influences of a mingled migration from the northern Asian continent and the southern Pacific areas and the local Jōmon peoples. Among those elements are the precursors to Shinto, architectural styles, and technological developments such as lacquerware, laminated bows called yumi, and metalworking.

== Cultural revival ==
Modern public perception of Jōmon has gradually changed from primitive and obsolete to captivating:

- In the early 21st century, Jōmon cord marking style was revived and used on clothing, accessories, and tattoos. Archaeologist Jun Takayama has theorized that the patterns on Dogū depicted tattoos.
- In the 1970s, a movement started to reproduce the ancient techniques of Jōmon-style ceramics. Contemporary Jōmon pottery is based on Jōmon-style ceramics and earthenware that has been replicated with ancient techniques, such as a bonfire.
- The motifs of Jōmon artifacts are used as inspiration for vessels and origami, cookies, candies, notebooks, and neckties.
- In 2018, a Jōmon exhibition at the Tokyo National Museum saw 350,000 visitors, 3.5 times more than expected.
- Jōmon-style pit houses have been recreated in places such as the Jōmon Village Historic Garden.
- Magazines such as Jōmonzine cover the prehistoric period.

== See also ==
- Comb Ceramic
- Genetic and anthropometric studies on Japanese people
- History of Japan
- Jade
- Unofficial nengō system (私年号)
- Japanese Paleolithic
- Ko-Shintō
- Prehistoric Asia
- Proto-Japonic language
- Shellmidden Period
