= 2026 Shymkent Challenger II =

- Date: 27 April – 3 May
- Edition: 8th
- Surface: Clay
- Location: Shymkent, Kazakhstan

Champions

Singles
- (Belgium) Buvaysar Gadamauri

Doubles
- (Croatia) Admir Kalender / (Croatia) Mili Poljičak
- Shymkent Challenger

The 2026 Shymkent Challenger II was a professional tennis tournament played on clay courts. It was the eighth edition of the tournament which was part of the 2026 ATP Challenger Tour. It took place in Shymkent, Kazakhstan between 27 April and 3 May 2026.

== Singles main-draw entrants ==
=== Seeds ===
Country	Player	Rank^{1}	Seed
LTU	Edas Butvilas	261	1
	Ivan Gakhov	263	2
BIH	Andrej Nedić	285	3
BUL	Dimitar Kuzmanov	310	4
CRO	Mili Poljičak	313	5
FRA	Antoine Ghibaudo	325	6
FRA	Sean Cuenin	341	7
	Petr Bar Biryukov	343	8

- ^{1} Rankings are as of 20 April 2026.

=== Other entrants ===
The following players received wildcards into the singles main draw:

- (Uzbekistan) Nikita Belozertsev
- (Kazakhstan) Zangar Nurlanuly
- (Kazakhstan) Amir Omarkhanov

The following player received entry into the singles main draw using a protected ranking:

- (Netherlands) Gijs Brouwer

The following players received entry into the singles main draw as alternates:

- (Poland) Tomasz Berkieta
- (Germany) Max Wiskandt

The following players received entry from the qualifying draw:

- (South Korea) Gerard Campaña Lee
- (Japan) Sora Fukuda
- Svyatoslav Gulin
- (Ukraine) Oleksii Krutykh
- (Ukraine) Vladyslav Orlov
- (Germany) Max Hans Rehberg

== Champions ==
=== Singles ===
- (Belgium) Buvaysar Gadamauri def. (India) Manas Dhamne 7–6^{(8–6)}, 6–4.

=== Doubles ===
- (Croatia) Admir Kalender / (Croatia) Mili Poljičak def. (Norway) Viktor Durasovic / (Germany) Kai Wehnelt 6–2, 6–7^{(7–9)}, [10–5].
