= Challenger Città di Cervia =

- 2026 Challenger Città di Cervia

ATP Challenger Tour
- Event name: CAME Cup Città di Cervia
- Location: Cervia, Italy
- Category: ATP Challenger Tour
- Surface: Clay

The Challenger Città di Cervia, known as the CAME Cup Città di Cervia (for sponsorship reasons), is a professional tennis tournament played on clay courts. It is currently part of the ATP Challenger Tour. It was first held in Cervia, Italy in 2026.

== Past finals ==
=== Singles ===
Year	Champion	Runner-up	Score
2026	(Spain) Max Alcalá Gurri	(Belgium) Buvaysar Gadamauri	2–6, 6–1, 6–1

=== Doubles ===
Year	Champions	Runners-up	Score
2026	(Italy) Francesco Forti (Italy) Filippo Romano	(Argentina) Santiago Rodríguez Taverna (Spain) David Vega Hernández	6–3, 6–4
