= Domen (clay mask) =

Type of Japanese archaeological artefact

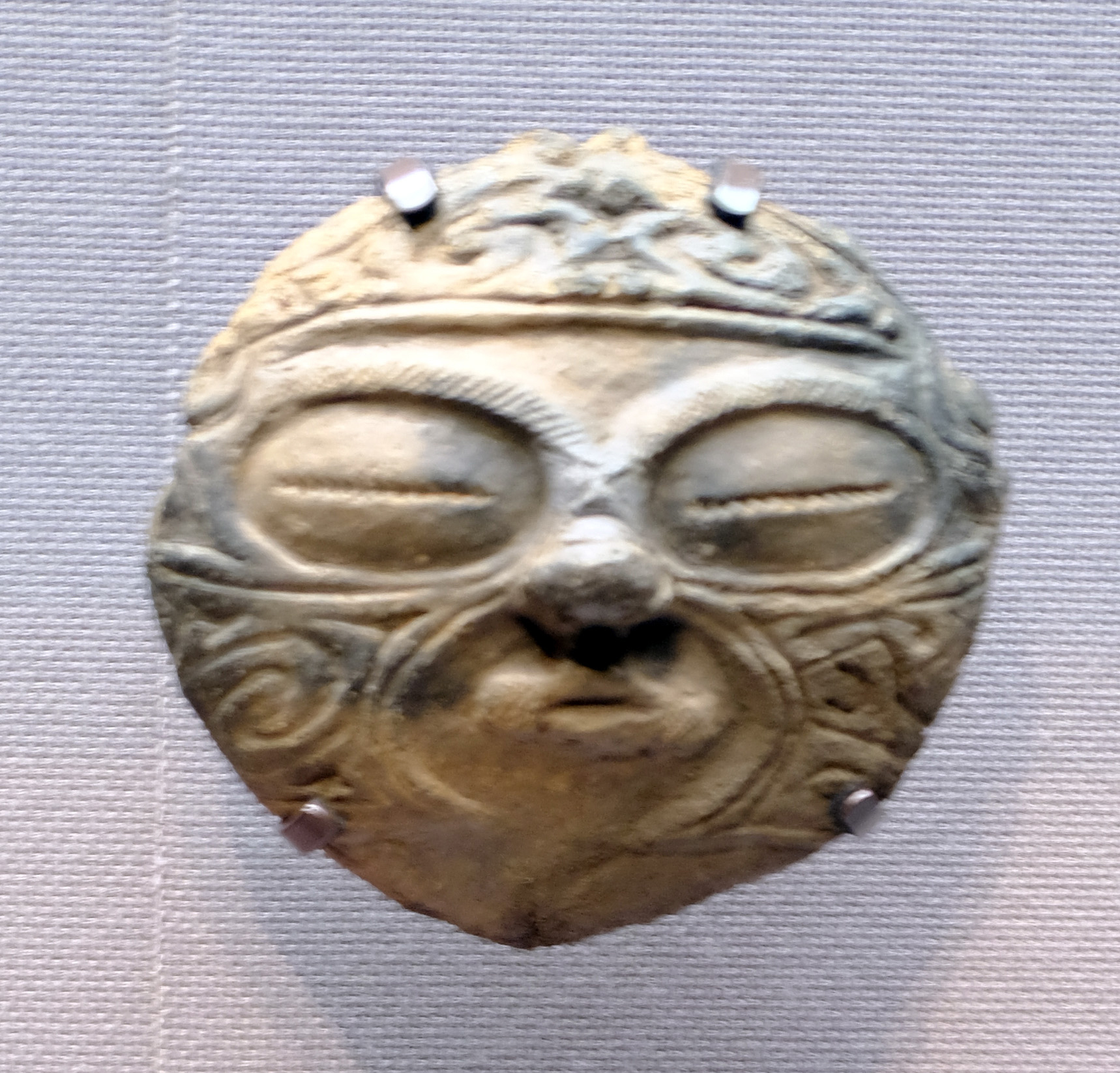
Final Jōmon domen (ICP) from Kamegaoka in Tsugaru, Aomori Prefecture (10.3 by 11.3 centimetres (4.1 in × 4.4 in)) (Tokyo National Museum)

Domen (土面) or "clay masks" are one of the ceramic artefact types of Jōmon Japan, alongside doban, dogū, and Jōmon pots.

== Overview ==
Some 140 masks are known from the Jōmon period, including c. 120 of clay, ten of shell, and a handful in stone. Mainly Late and Final Jōmon, they are particularly numerous in Tōhoku, including from funerary contexts. Some masks have holes for string for wearing; other smaller examples may have been placed on the forehead, hung on the chest, or carried in the hands. Some masks may have been partly of clay, fitted with sections of wood, bark, or leather. Styles include "goggle-eyed" (遮光器型土面), "tear-shedding" (涙を流す土面), and "crooked-nosed" (鼻曲がり土面) masks.

== Important Cultural Properties ==
Three domen have been designated Important Cultural Properties:

- Domen from Chitose, Hokkaido (Hokkaido Archaeological Operations Center)
- Domen from Kamegaoka in Tsugaru, Aomori Prefecture (Tokyo National Museum)
- Domen from Kitaakita, Akita Prefecture (The University Museum, The University of Tokyo)

== Gallery ==
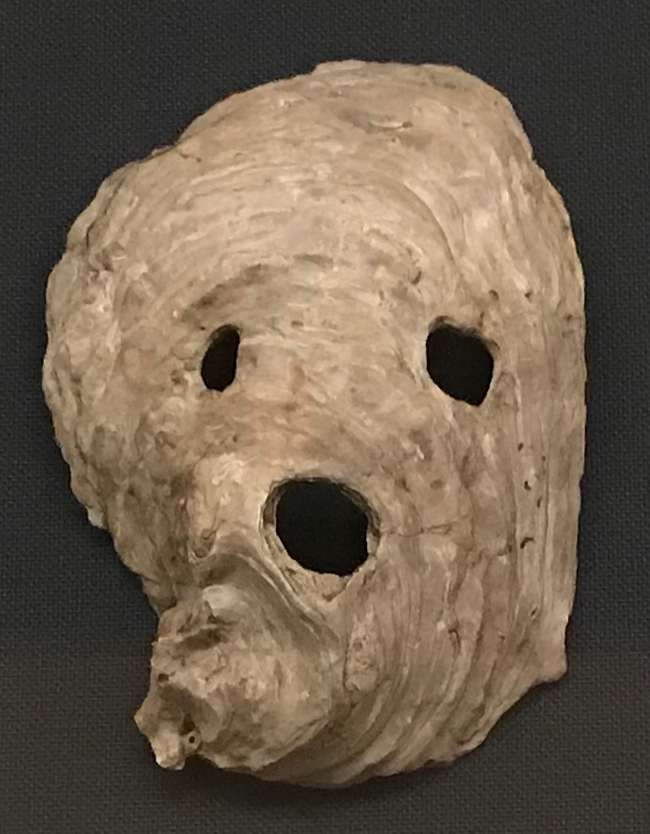
Kaimen (shell mask) from Adaka-Kurobashi Shell Mound (Kumamoto Prefecture

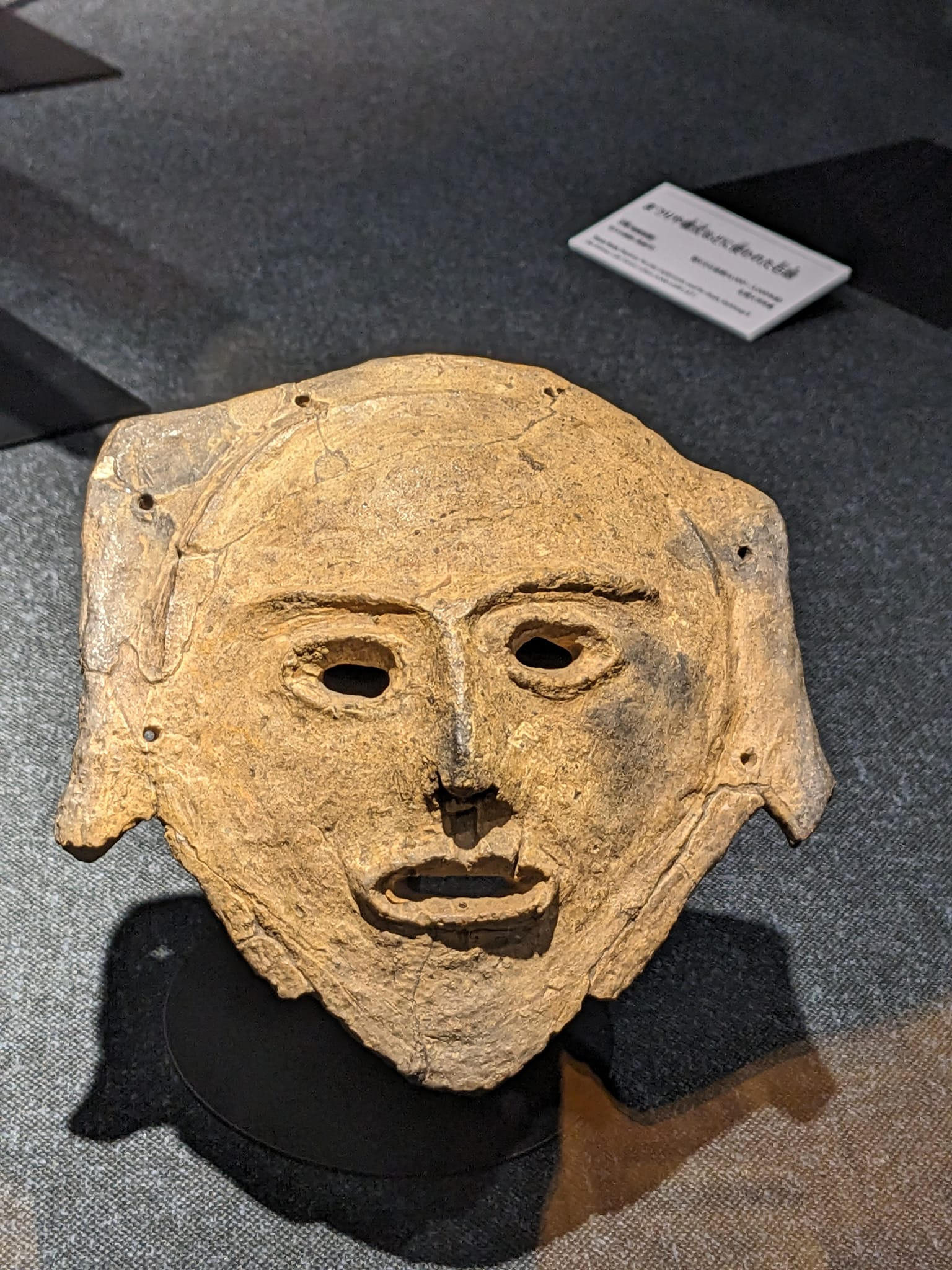
Domen (ICP) from Chitose, Hokkaido (replica)

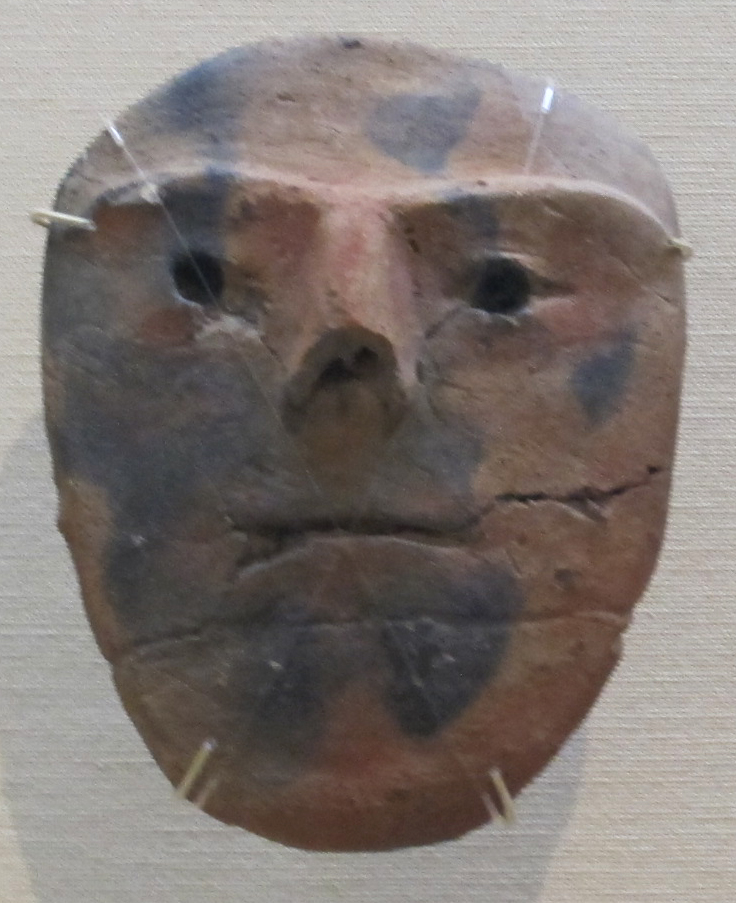
Domen (Tokyo National Museum)

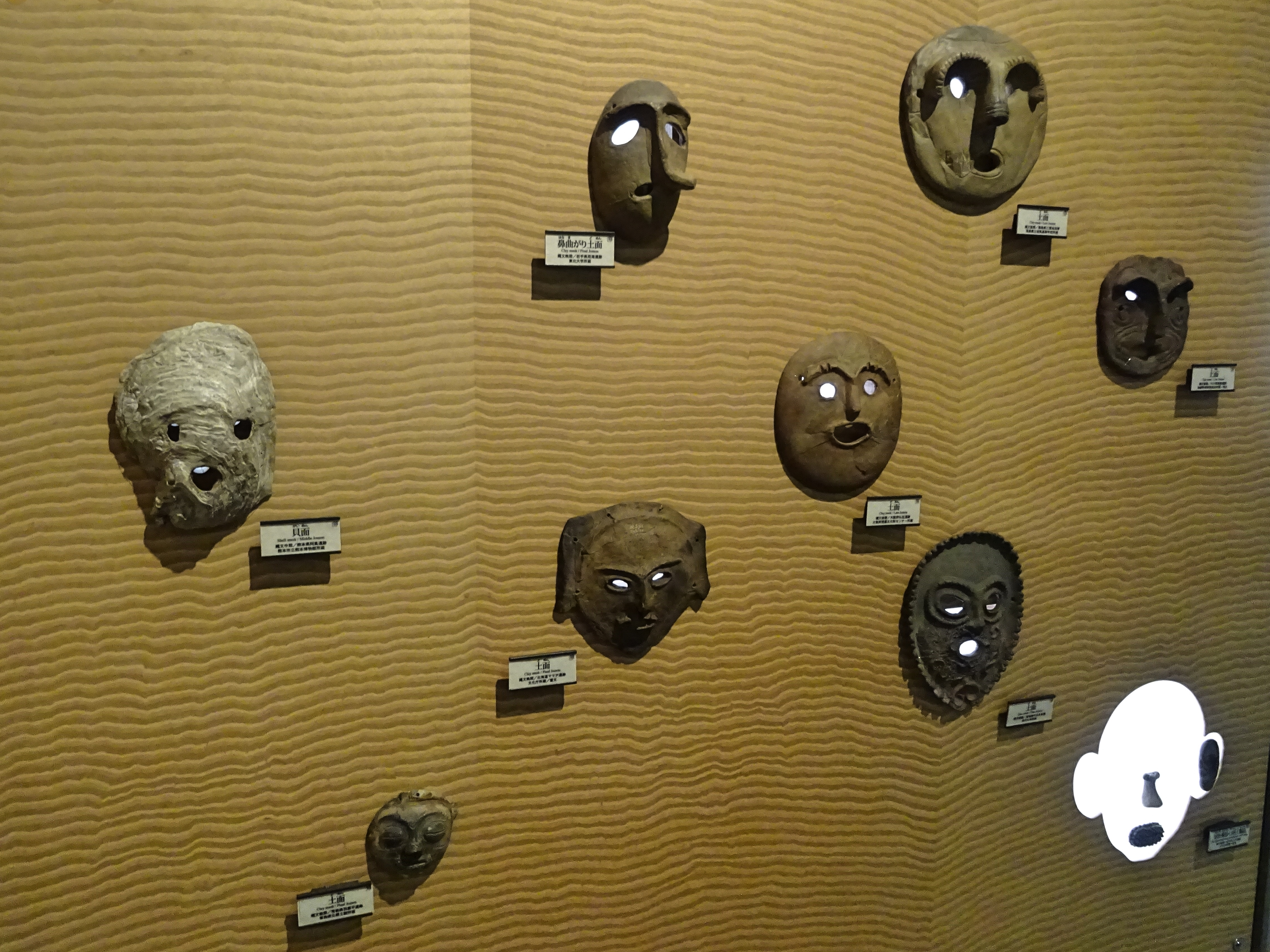
Shell mask and clay masks (Niigata Prefectural Museum of History)

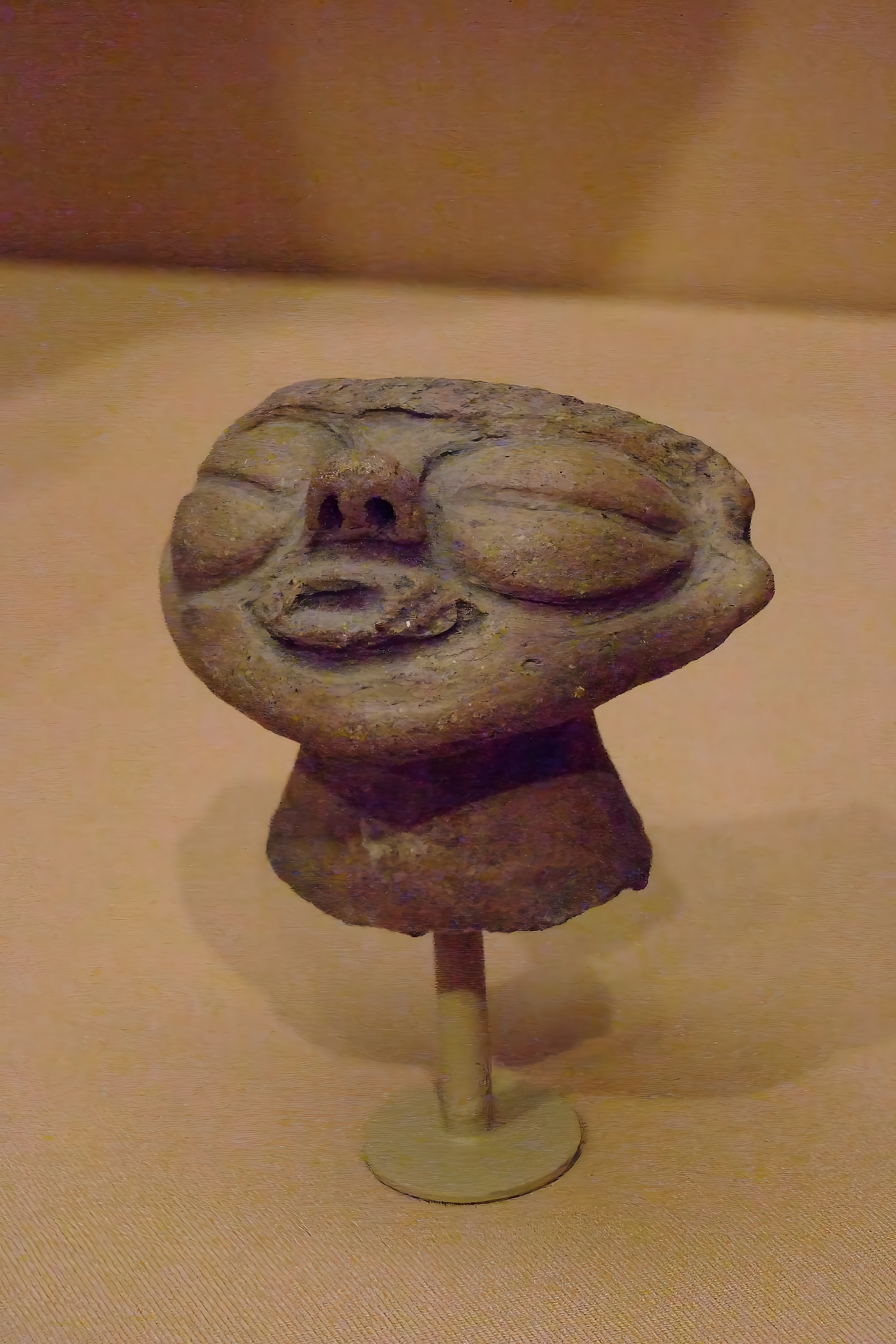
Clay head (Asian Art Museum, San Francisco)

== See also ==
- Jōmon period sites
- Masked Goddess
- Gangū
