= Bree, Belgium =

Bree: Brée (French)
- City and municipality
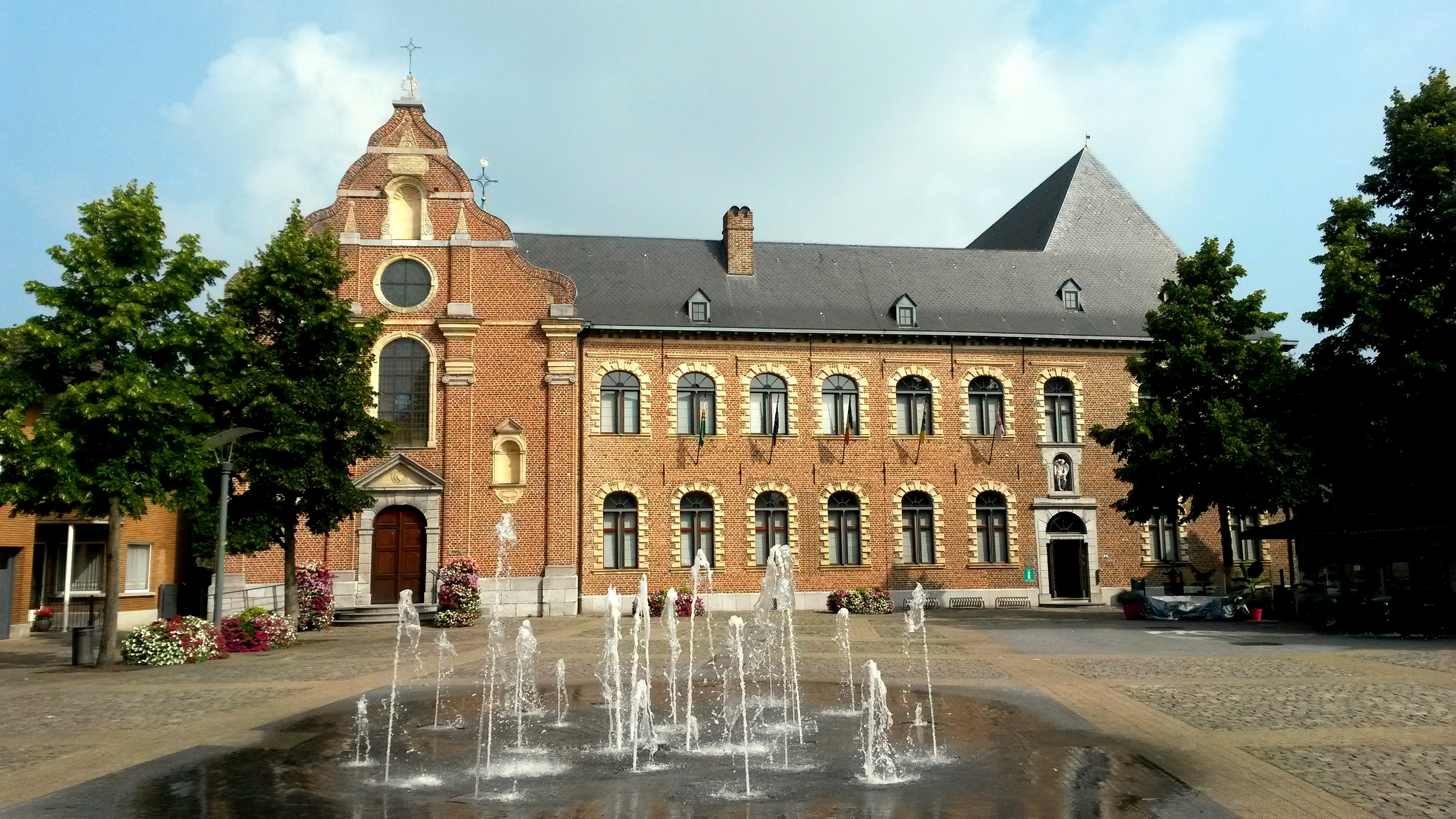

- Flag Coat of arms

- Location of Bree in Limburg
- Interactive map of Bree
- Location in Belgium
- Coordinates: 51°08′N 05°36′E
- Country: Belgium
- Community: Flemish Community
- Region: Flemish Region
- Province: Limburg
- Arrondissement: Maaseik

Government
  - Mayor: Sietse Wils (Verjonging)
  - Governing parties: Verjonging, N-VA

Area
  - Total: 64.98 km^{2} (25.09 sq mi)

Population (2022-01-01)
  - Total: 16,324
  - Density: 251.2/km^{2} (650.6/sq mi)
- Demonym: Breeë(r)naar
- Postal codes: 3960
- NIS code: 72004
- Area codes: 089
- Website: www.bree.be

Bree (Dutch pronunciation: [ˈbreː]; French: Brée, French pronunciation: [bʁe]) is a municipality and city in the Flemish province of Limburg, Belgium. In December 2021, Bree had a total population of 16,097. The total area is 64.96 km^{2} (25.08 sq mi) which gives it a population density of 246 inhabitants per square kilometre (640/sq mi). The mayor of Bree is Sietse Wils.

== Toponymy ==
In Latin sources from the 15th to the 17th century, Bree was frequently referred to as Breda.

== Culture ==
=== Cultural center ===
- De Zeepziederij, the cultural center of Bree. This center was known till 2019 as the cultural center of De Breughel.

=== Musea ===
- Stadsmuseum Bree, located in the old town hall
- Rijtuigmuseum Bree
- De Gulden Tas, the smallest coffee roastery in Belgium, founded in 1995

=== Events ===
- The yearly Sint-Niklaasmarkt on 5 December, organized from the start of the 17th century
- The yearly Goat market which takes place on the first Monday after the first week of October. Many years ago the best goats were sold here, now it is a folklore-event

== Climate ==
Climate in this area has mild differences between highs and lows, and there is adequate rainfall year-round. The Köppen Climate Classification subtype for this climate is "Cfb" (Marine West Coast Climate/Oceanic climate).

== Demographics ==
Bree had a population of 16,097 (7,991 men and 8,106 women) as of 6 December 2021, 9% of the population has a foreign nationality.

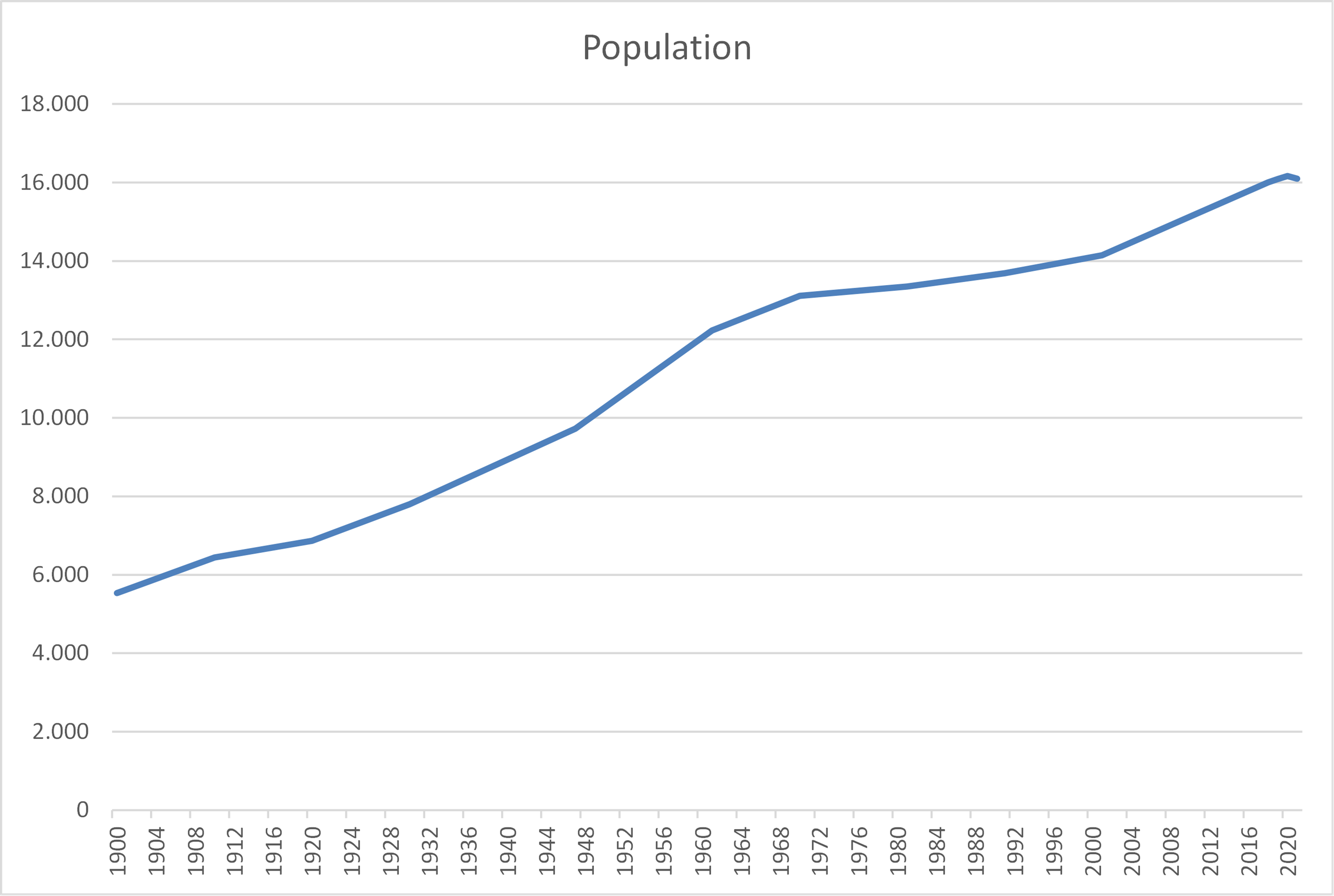

=== Income ===
The average income in Bree is €18,659 per year as of 2019.

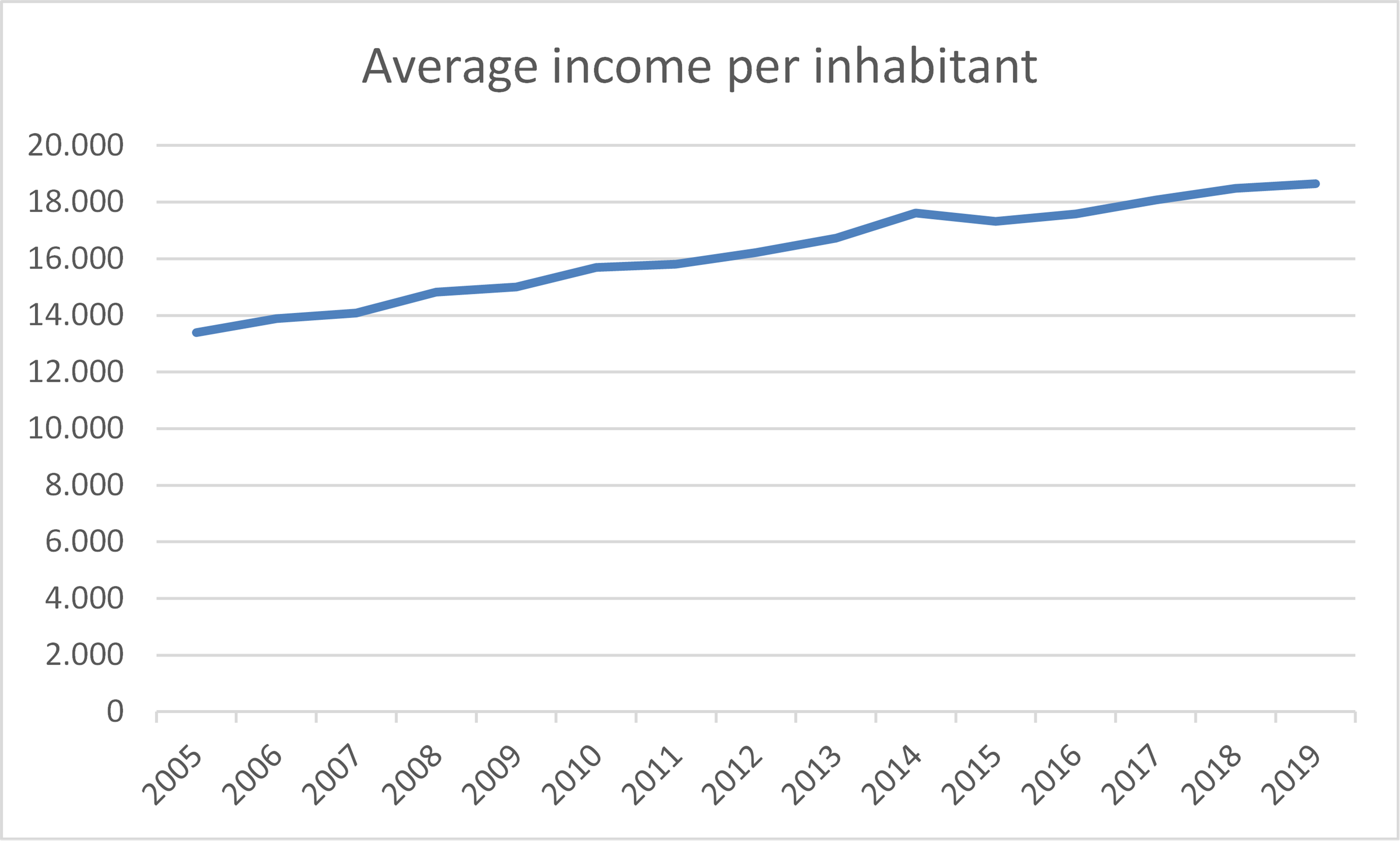

Climate data for Bree
Month	Jan	Feb	Mar	Apr	May	Jun	Jul	Aug	Sep	Oct	Nov	Dec	Year
Mean daily maximum °C (°F)	4 (40)	5 (41)	10 (50)	14 (58)	19 (66)	22 (71)	23 (74)	23 (74)	20 (68)	15 (59)	9 (49)	6 (42)	14 (58)
Mean daily minimum °C (°F)	−1 (31)	−2 (29)	1 (34)	3 (38)	7 (45)	10 (50)	12 (54)	12 (54)	10 (50)	6 (43)	3 (38)	1 (34)	6 (42)
Average precipitation cm (inches)	13 (5)	6.1 (2.4)	5.6 (2.2)	5.1 (2)	5.8 (2.3)	7.4 (2.9)	7.6 (3)	14 (5.5)	7.9 (3.1)	10 (4)	7.9 (3.1)	8.9 (3.5)	99 (38.9)
Source: Weatherbase

== Notable inhabitants ==
- Sky Remans, Olympic snowboarder in 2026
- Jaak Broekx, oldest man in Belgium from 2021 to 2023
- Kim Clijsters, tennis player, former WTA number 1
- Lei Clijsters, football player, father of Kim
- Thibaut Courtois, football player for Real Madrid and the Belgium national football team
- Gert Doumen, former football player
- Stefan Everts, motocross racer, 10-time Motocross World Champion
- Johnny Galecki, American actor, born in Bree; raised in the United States
- Bas Leinders, racing driver, tested for the Minardi Formula 1 team in 2004, born in Bree
- Max Verstappen, four time Formula One World Champion driver for Red Bull Racing
- Douwe Dedecker, racing driver

== Twin towns – sister cities ==
Bree is twinned with:

- Geldern, Germany
- Salomó, Spain
- Volpago, Italy

In addition, Bree established economic cooperation with Yangzhou, China.

== See also ==
- Bree vs Breda – Overview of primary sources in which Bree is referred to as Breda
