= Gert Doumen =

Belgian footballer

Personal information
- Date of birth: 24 June 1971 (age 55)
- Place of birth: Bree, Belgium
- Height: 1.84 m (6 ft 1/2 in)
- Position: Goalkeeper

Youth career
- –1991: Genk

Senior career*
Years	Team	Apps	(Gls)
1991–2000	Genk	49	(0)
2000–2001	Mouscron	3	(0)
2001–2002	RWDM	15	(0)
2002–2004	Patro Eisden		
2004–2006	Heusden-Zolder		
2006–2007	OH Leuven		
2007	Patro Eisden		
- * Club domestic league appearances and goals as of 27 June 2012

Gert Doumen (born 24 June 1971 in Bree) is a retired Belgian football goalkeeper who played several seasons at the highest level of professional football with Genk, RWDM, Mouscron and Heusden-Zolder.

Doumen started his career with Genk, where he was promoted from the youth ranks to the first team squad in 1991. For several seasons, he was often the second goalkeeper behind Ronny Gaspercic and István Brockhauser, although he collected over 49 games with Genk. As such he was part of the team that played at the highest level of Belgian football between 1991-1994 and 1996-2000, including the promotion from the second division in 1996 and the first division title in 1999. Thereafter, he moved on to first division teams Mouscron and RWDM, staying one season each time, before trying his luck in the lower leagues with Patro Eisden. He was called back into the first league by newly promoted Heusden-Zolder and stayed with the team when they relegated until the team went bankrupt and folded the season thereafter in 2006. In November 2006, he was signed by OH Leuven as a spare keeper after severe injuries to first keepers Mike Van Hamel and Thierry Berghmans and played a few matches before being released after their recovery in February 2007. Thereafter he had a short spell back at Patro Eisden, where he stopped his playing career and started coaching the goalkeepers of the youth squad.
