= Manas Dhamne =

Indian tennis player

- Country (sports): India
- Born: 29 December 2007 (age 18) Satara, India
- Height: 1.83 m (6 ft 0 in)
- Turned pro: 2023
- Plays: Right-handed (two-handed backhand)
- Coach: Riccardo Piatti
- Prize money: US $92,629

Singles
- Career record: 0–1 (at ATP Tour level, Grand Slam level, and in Davis Cup)
- Career titles: 0
- Highest ranking: No. 362 (3 August 2026)
- Current ranking: No. 362 (3 August 2026)

Grand Slam singles results
- Australian Open Junior: 2R (2023)
- French Open Junior: 1R (2025)
- Wimbledon Junior: 2R (2023)

Doubles
- Career record: 0–0 (at ATP Tour level, Grand Slam level, and in Davis Cup)
- Career titles: 0
- Highest ranking: No. 1,429 (31 March 2025)
- Current ranking: No. 1,610 (3 August 2026)
- Last updated on: 3 August 2026.

Manas Dhamne (born 29 December 2007) is an Indian professional tennis player. He has a career-high ATP singles ranking of No. 362 achieved on 3 August 2026 and a doubles ranking of No. 1,429 reached on 31 March 2025.

== Personal life ==
Dhamne is from Pune in Maharashtra. He was previously coached in Pune by coach Ravindra Pandey at RPTA. He left India to train with Riccardo Piatti at the Piatti Tennis Center in Bordighera, Italy. In October 2022 he became the youngest Indian to win a junior title at the ITF Asian B1 championships.

== Junior career ==
Despite his early focus on Professional Tour, Dhamne had good results on the ITF junior circuit, maintaining a 57–37 singles win-loss record and reached an ITF junior combined ranking of No. 43 on 2 January 2023.

== Professional career ==
=== 2023: ATP debut ===
In January 2023, Dhamne made his ATP Tour debut at the 2023 Tata Open Maharashtra as a wildcard. In doing so, he became the first player born in 2007 to play a main draw match on the tour. He lost to American Michael Mmoh in the first round in straight sets. Playing in the Boys' singles at the 2023 Australian Open Dhamne was the youngest player to win a first round match when he defeated Jeremy Zhang in straight sets.

=== 2025: Masters qualifying debut ===
Dhamne received a wildcard for the qualifying draw of the Masters 1000 2025 Mutua Madrid Open, marking his debut at this level. At 17 years old, ranked No. 775 and the fifth-highest-ranked player under 18, he lost to Italy's Luca Nardi in the first round in straight sets, 4–6, 4–6, in a match lasting 1 hour and 15 minutes.

He practiced with 2014 US Open finalist Kei Nishikori.

=== 2026: First Challenger Final ===
Dhamne reached the final of the Shymkent Challenger II. As a result, he reached top 400 at No. 384 on 4 May 2026.

== Performance timeline ==
Key
W	F	SF	QF	#R	RR	Q#	DNQ	A	NH

(W) winner; (F) finalist; (SF) semifinalist; (QF) quarterfinalist; (#R) rounds 4, 3, 2, 1; (RR) round-robin stage; (Q#) qualification round; (DNQ) did not qualify; (A) absent; (NH) not held; (SR) strike rate (events won / competed); (W–L) win–loss record.
To avoid confusion and double counting, these charts are updated at the conclusion of a tournament or when the player's participation has ended.

=== Singles ===
Current through the 2026 Madrid Open.

Tournament	2025	2026	SR	W–L	Win%
Grand Slam tournaments
Australian Open	A	A	0 / 0	0–0	–
French Open	A		0 / 0	0–0	–
Wimbledon	A		0 / 0	0–0	–
US Open	A		0 / 0	0–0	–
Win–loss	0–0	0–0	0 / 0	0–0	–
Career statistics
Tournaments	1	0	1		
Overall win–loss	0–1	0–0	0 / 1	0–1	0%
Year-end ranking	588	–			

== ATP Challenger Tour finals ==
=== Singles: 1 (runner-up) ===
Result	W–L	Date	Tournament	Surface	Opponent	Score
Loss	0–1	Apr 2026	Shymkent Challenger II, Kazakhstan	Clay	(Belgium) Buvaysar Gadamauri	6–7^{(6–8)}, 4–6

== ITF World Tennis Tour finals ==
=== Singles: 4 (3 titles, 1 runner-up) ===
Finals by surface
Hard (3–1)
Clay (–)

Result	W–L	Date	Tournament	Surface	Opponent	Score
Win	1–0	Feb 2025	M15 Monastir, Tunisia	Hard	(Italy) Lorenzo Carboni	2–6, 6–0, 6–2
Win	2–0	Sep 2025	M15 Monastir, Tunisia	Hard	(France) César Bouchelaghem	6–2, 6–0
Loss	2–1	Dec 2025	M15 Monastir, Tunisia	Hard	(Bulgaria) Pyotr Nesterov	1–6, 4–6
Win	3–1	Feb 2026	M15 Zahra, Kuwait	Hard	(Monaco) Rocco Piatti	7–5, 6–3

== See also ==
- Tennis in India
