= 2025 Città di Biella =

- Date: 8 – 14 September
- Edition: 17th
- Surface: Clay
- Location: Biella, Italy

Champions

Singles
- (Italy) Stefano Napolitano

Doubles
- (Italy) Gianluca Cadenasso / (Italy) Filippo Romano
- Città di Biella

The 2025 Città di Biella was a professional tennis tournament played on outdoor red clay courts. It was part of the 2025 ATP Challenger Tour. It took in Biella, Italy between 8 and 14 September 2025.

== Singles main-draw entrants ==
=== Seeds ===
Country	Player	Rank^{1}	Seed
~~ITA~~	~~Stefano Travaglia~~	~~208~~	~~1~~
CZE	Zdeněk Kolář	278	2
ITA	Marco Cecchinato	279	3
SUI	Alexander Ritschard	284	4
GER	Marko Topo	285	5
ESP	Alejandro Moro Cañas	300	6
UKR	Oleg Prihodko	309	7
NED	Jelle Sels	332	8

- Rankings are as of 25 August 2025.

=== Other entrants ===
The following players received wildcards into the singles main draw:

- (Italy) Gianluca Cadenasso
- (Italy) Stefano Napolitano
- (Italy) Filippo Romano

The following player received entry into the singles main draw as an alternate:

- (Italy) Alexander Weis

The following players received entry from the qualifying draw:

- (Italy) Lorenzo Carboni
- (France) Maxime Chazal
- (Belgium) Buvaysar Gadamauri
- (Spain) Pol Martín Tiffon
- (Italy) Giovanni Oradini
- (Serbia) Stefan Popović

The following player received entry as a lucky loser:

- (Italy) Federico Iannaccone

== Champions ==
=== Singles ===
- (Italy) Stefano Napolitano def. (Switzerland) Kilian Feldbausch 7–5, 6–3.

=== Doubles ===
- (Italy) Gianluca Cadenasso / (Italy) Filippo Romano def. (Belgium) Buvaysar Gadamauri / (Netherlands) Jelle Sels 6–3, 7–5.
