= Buvaysar Gadamauri =

Belgian tennis player (born 2000)

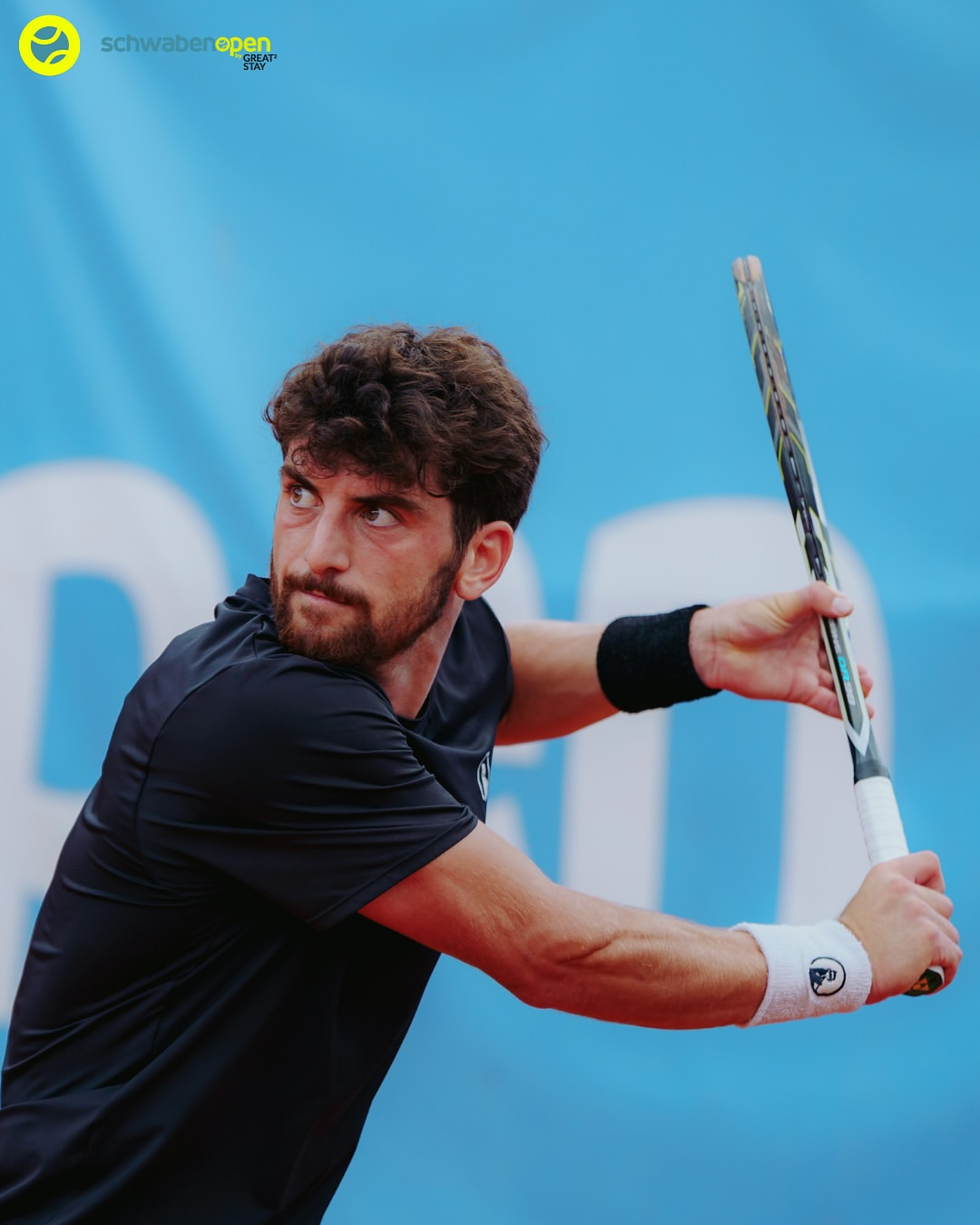
- Gadamauri at the 2025 Augsburg Challenger
- Country (sports): Belgium
- Born: 10 July 2000 (age 26) Bree, Belgium
- Height: 1.83 m (6 ft 0 in)
- Plays: Right-handed (one-handed backhand)
- Prize money: US $125,607

Singles
- Career record: 0–0
- Career titles: 1 Challenger, 1 ITF
- Highest ranking: No. 251 (20 July 2026)
- Current ranking: No. 251 (20 July 2026)

Doubles
- Career record: 0–0
- Career titles: 8 ITF
- Highest ranking: No. 270 (25 May 2026)
- Current ranking: No. 304 (20 July 2026)
- Last updated on: 20 July 2026.

Buvaysar Gadamauri (born 10 July 2000) is a Belgian professional tennis player. He has a career-high ATP singles ranking of No. 251 achieved on 20 July 2026 and a doubles ranking of No. 270 reached on 25 May 2026.

== Career ==
In September 2025, Gadamauri reached his first ATP Challenger final in doubles with Jelle Sels – in Biella, Italy. The pair lost to second seeds and home favourites Gianluca Cadenasso and Filippo Romano in the final.

In May 2026, Gadamauri won his maiden Challenger singles title in Shymkent, Kazakhstan, defeating Manas Dhamne in the final. As a result, he made his debut in the top 300 in the ATP singles rankings on 4 May 2026.

== ATP Challenger Tour finals ==
=== Singles: 2 (1 title, 1 runner-up) ===
Result	W–L	Date	Tournament	Surface	Opponent	Score
Win	1–0	Apr 2026	Shymkent Challenger II, Kazakhstan	Clay	(India) Manas Dhamne	7–6^{(8–6)}, 6–4
Loss	1–1	May 2026	Challenger Città di Cervia, Italy	Clay	(Spain) Max Alcalá Gurri	6–2, 1–6, 1–6

=== Doubles: 2 (2 runner-ups) ===
Result	W–L	Date	Tournament	Surface	Partner	Opponents	Score
Loss	0–1	Sep 2025	Challenger Città di Biella, Italy	Clay	(Netherlands) Jelle Sels	(Italy) Gianluca Cadenasso (Italy) Filippo Romano	3–6, 5–7
Loss	0–2	Apr 2026	Wuning Challenger, China	Hard	(United Kingdom) Giles Hussey	(Australia) Joshua Charlton (United Kingdom) Ben Jones	4–6, 2–6
