= 2016 Thindown Challenger Biella – Singles =

Singles
- 2016 Thindown Challenger Biella

Final
- Champion: (Italy) Federico Gaio
- Runner-up: (Brazil) Thomaz Bellucci
- Score: 7–6^{(7–5)}, 6–2

Events
Singles	Doubles
← 2015 ·	Thindown Challenger Biella	· 2017 →

Andrej Martin was the defending champion but lost in the quarterfinals to João Souza.

Federico Gaio won the title after defeating Thomaz Bellucci 7–6^{(7–5)}, 6–2 in the final.

== Seeds ==
1. (Italy) Paolo Lorenzi (second round)
2. (Brazil) Thomaz Bellucci (final)
3. (Serbia) Dušan Lajović (quarterfinals)
4. (Argentina) Carlos Berlocq (second round)
5. (Russia) Karen Khachanov (second round)
6. (Slovakia) Andrej Martin (quarterfinals)
7. (Argentina) Marco Trungelliti (second round)
8. (Germany) Daniel Brands (first round)

== Draw ==
=== Key ===
- Q = Qualifier
- WC = Wild card
- LL = Lucky loser
- Alt = Alternate
- SE = Special exempt
- PR = Protected ranking
- ITF = ITF entry
- JE = Junior exempt
- w/o = Walkover
- r = Retired
- d = Defaulted
- SR = Special ranking

=== Finals ===
Semifinals
(Brazil) João Souza	6	6^{7}	4
(Italy) Federico Gaio	2	7^{9}	6
WC	(Italy) Stefano Napolitano	6	3	3
2	(Brazil) Thomaz Bellucci	3	6	6

Final
(Italy) Federico Gaio	7^{7}	6
2	(Brazil) Thomaz Bellucci	6^{5}	2

=== Top half ===
First round
1/WC	(Italy) P Lorenzi	6	3	6
(Italy) F Volandri	0	6	1
(Brazil) J Souza	7	6^{5}	6
WC	(Italy) G Mager	5	7^{7}	4
(Austria) M Linzer	6	3	2
Q	(Croatia) V Galović	4	6	6
(Sweden) C Lindell	3	3
6	(Slovakia) A Martin	6	6
4	(Argentina) C Berlocq	7	6
Q	(Argentina) A Collarini	5	3
(Argentina) N Kicker	6^{6}	6	6^{5}
(Spain) E López-Pérez	7^{8}	4	7^{7}
(Chile) G Lama	5	0^{r}
(Italy) F Gaio	7	4
Q	(Italy) Francisco Bahamonde	6^{0}	3
7	(Argentina) M Trungelliti	7^{7}	6

Second round
1/WC	(Italy) P Lorenzi	4	5
(Brazil) J Souza	6	7
Q	(Croatia) V Galović	6	1	4
6	(Slovakia) A Martin	3	6	6
4	(Argentina) C Berlocq	4	6	6^{5}
(Spain) E López-Pérez	6	3	7^{7}
(Italy) F Gaio	6	7^{7}
7	(Argentina) M Trungelliti	4	6^{5}

Quarterfinals
(Brazil) J Souza	7^{7}	6
6	(Slovakia) A Martin	6^{3}	1
(Spain) E López-Pérez	7	6^{6}	3
(Italy) F Gaio	5	7^{8}	6

Semifinals
(Brazil) J Souza	6	6^{7}	4
(Italy) F Gaio	2	7^{9}	6

=== Bottom half ===
First round
5	(Russia) K Khachanov	3	6	6
(Italy) A Arnaboldi	6	3	1
WC	(Italy) S Napolitano	6	6
(Sweden) E Ymer	4	4
(Italy) M Donati	6	6
(Chile) H Podlipnik-Castillo	3	4
(Russia) A Rublev	4	6^{7}
3	(Serbia) D Lajović	6	7^{9}
8	(Germany) D Brands	1	7^{11}	1
SE	(Russia) A Karatsev	6	6^{9}	6
(Italy) A Giannessi	3	1
(Argentina) G Andreozzi	6	6
WC	(Italy) G Quinzi	3	6	1
Q	(Bosnia and Herzegovina) T Brkić	6	2	6
(Italy) S Caruso	2^{r}
2	(Brazil) T Bellucci	3

Second round
5	(Russia) K Khachanov	5	6	2
WC	(Italy) S Napolitano	7	3	6
(Italy) M Donati	6	5	3
3	(Serbia) D Lajović	4	7	6
SE	(Russia) A Karatsev	2	2
(Argentina) G Andreozzi	6	6
Q	(Bosnia and Herzegovina) T Brkić	3	6	0
2	(Brazil) T Bellucci	6	4	6

Quarterfinals
WC	(Italy) S Napolitano	1	6	6
3	(Serbia) D Lajović	6	3	3
(Argentina) G Andreozzi	7^{8}	3	3
2	(Brazil) T Bellucci	6^{6}	6	6

Semifinals
WC	(Italy) S Napolitano	6	3	3
2	(Brazil) T Bellucci	3	6	6
