= 2021 Biella Challenger V – Singles =

Singles
- 2021 Biella Challenger V

Final
- Champion: (Peru) Juan Pablo Varillas
- Runner-up: (Argentina) Guido Andreozzi
- Score: 6–3, 6–1

Events
Singles	Doubles
← 2020 ·	Biella Challenger	· 2021 →

Facundo Bagnis was the defending champion but chose not to defend his title.

Juan Pablo Varillas won the title after defeating Guido Andreozzi 6–3, 6–1 in the final.

== Seeds ==
1. (Portugal) Pedro Sousa (first round)
2. (Bolivia) Hugo Dellien (second round)
3. (United States) Mackenzie McDonald (second round)
4. (Germany) Cedrik-Marcel Stebe (first round)
5. (Italy) Federico Gaio (quarterfinals)
6. (France) Hugo Gaston (first round)
7. (Peru) Juan Pablo Varillas (champion)
8. (Japan) Go Soeda (first round)

== Draw ==
Key

- Q = Qualifier
- WC = Wild card
- LL = Lucky loser
- Alt = Alternate
- ITF = ITF entry
- PR = Protected ranking
- SR = Special ranking
- SE = Special exempt
- JE = Junior exempt
- JR = Junior Accelerator Programme entrant
- CO = College Accelerator Programme entrant
- NG = Next Gen Accelerator Program entrant
- w/o = Walkover
- r = Retired
- d = Defaulted

=== Finals ===
Semifinals
7	(Peru) Juan Pablo Varillas	6	2	6
(France) Alexandre Müller	2	6	2
Q	(Argentina) Guido Andreozzi	7	6
Alt	(Argentina) Andrea Collarini	5	2

Final
7	(Peru) Juan Pablo Varillas	6	6
Q	(Argentina) Guido Andreozzi	3	1

=== Top half ===
First round
1	(Portugal) P Sousa	6^{3}	4
(Brazil) J Menezes	7^{7}	6
WC	(Serbia) H Međedović	7	7^{7}
(Belgium) R Bemelmans	5	6^{4}
LL	(Bulgaria) D Kuzmanov	6	1	6
(Italy) L Giustino	3	6	3
(Italy) A Giannessi	4	5
7	(Peru) JP Varillas	6	7
3	(United States) M McDonald	3	6	6
(Argentina) JM Cerúndolo	6	4	3
WC	(Italy) L Vanni	6^{7}	0
(Argentina) L Mayer	7^{9}	6
(China) Zh Zhang	4	6	6
Q	(Brazil) F Meligeni Alves	6	4	4
(France) A Müller	1	6	6
6	(France) H Gaston	6	3	3

Second round
(Brazil) J Menezes	7	2	6
WC	(Serbia) H Međedović	5	6	4
LL	(Bulgaria) D Kuzmanov	1	7	6^{0}
7	(Peru) JP Varillas	6	5	7^{7}
3	(United States) M McDonald	7^{7}	2	4
(Argentina) L Mayer	6^{0}	6	6
(China) Zh Zhang	3	7^{7}	5
(France) A Müller	6	6^{4}	7

Quarterfinals
(Brazil) J Menezes	4	3
7	(Peru) JP Varillas	6	6
(Argentina) L Mayer	3	4
(France) A Müller	6	6

Semifinals
7	(Peru) JP Varillas	6	2	6
(France) A Müller	2	6	2

=== Bottom half ===
First round
8	(Japan) G Soeda	2	1
Q	(Germany) M Marterer	6	6
Alt	(United Kingdom) J Clarke	7	6
Q	(Croatia) V Galović	5	2
Q	(Argentina) G Andreozzi	6	7
(Belgium) K Coppejans	2	5
LL	(Chile) MT Barrios Vera	6	6
4	(Germany) C-M Stebe	2	4
5	(Italy) F Gaio	6^{3}	7^{7}	6
(Italy) P Lorenzi	7^{7}	6^{4}	2
(Slovakia) F Horanský	2	4
(Portugal) J Domingues	6	6
Alt	(Argentina) A Collarini	6	6
(Australia) A Bolt	2	2
WC	(Italy) S Napolitano	0	7	1
2	(Bolivia) H Dellien	6	5	6

Second round
Q	(Germany) M Marterer	3	3
Alt	(United Kingdom) J Clarke	6	6
Q	(Argentina) G Andreozzi	3	6	6
LL	(Chile) MT Barrios Vera	6	3	3
5	(Italy) F Gaio	6	6
(Portugal) J Domingues	4	3
Alt	(Argentina) A Collarini	6	7
2	(Bolivia) H Dellien	1	5

Quarterfinals
Alt	(United Kingdom) J Clarke	6	3	5
Q	(Argentina) G Andreozzi	3	6	7
5	(Italy) F Gaio	6	4	1
Alt	(Argentina) A Collarini	4	6	6

Semifinals
Q	(Argentina) G Andreozzi	7	6
Alt	(Argentina) A Collarini	5	2
