= 2016 Thindown Challenger Biella =

- Date: 25–31 July 2016
- Edition: 9th
- Location: Biella, Italy

Champions

Singles
- (Italy) Federico Gaio

Doubles
- (Germany) Andre Begemann / (India) Leander Paes
← 2015 ·	Thindown Challenger Biella	· 2017 →

The 2016 Thindown Challenger Biella is a professional tennis tournament played on outdoor red clay courts. It is part of the 2016 ATP Challenger Tour. It took place in Biella, Italy between 25 and 31 July 2016.

== Entrants ==
=== Seeds ===
Country	Player	Rank^{1}	Seed
ITA	Paolo Lorenzi	48	1
BRA	Thomaz Bellucci	49	2
SRB	Dušan Lajović	83	3
ARG	Carlos Berlocq	87	4
RUS	Karen Khachanov	104	5
SVK	Andrej Martin	124	6
ARG	Marco Trungelliti	130	7
GER	Daniel Brands	135	8

- Rankings are as of July 18, 2016.

=== Other entrants ===
The following players received wildcards into the singles main draw:

- (Italy) Paolo Lorenzi
- (Italy) Gianluca Mager
- (Italy) Stefano Napolitano
- (Italy) Gianluigi Quinzi

The following player received entry into the singles main draw as a special exempt:

- (Russia) Aslan Karatsev

The following players received entry from the qualifying draw:

- (Bosnia and Herzegovina) Tomislav Brkić
- (Argentina) Andrea Collarini
- (Croatia) Viktor Galović
- (Italy) Francisco Bahamonde

== Champions ==
=== Singles ===
- (Italy) Federico Gaio def. (Brazil) Thomaz Bellucci 7–6^{(7–5)}, 6–2.

=== Doubles ===
- (Germany) Andre Begemann / (India) Leander Paes def. (Slovakia) Andrej Martin / (Chile) Hans Podlipnik 6–4, 6–4.
