= 2019 Thindown Challenger Biella – Singles =

Singles
- 2019 Thindown Challenger Biella

Final
- Champion: (Italy) Gianluca Mager
- Runner-up: (Italy) Paolo Lorenzi
- Score: 6–0, 6–7^{(4–7)}, 7–5

Events
Singles	Doubles
← 2018 ·	Thindown Challenger Biella	· 2020 →

Federico Delbonis was the defending champion but chose not to defend his title.

Gianluca Mager won the title after defeating Paolo Lorenzi 6–0, 6–7^{(4–7)}, 7–5 in the final.

== Seeds ==
All seeds receive a bye into the second round.

1. (Spain) Alejandro Davidovich Fokina (semifinals)
2. (Spain) Jaume Munar (semifinals)
3. (Slovakia) Andrej Martin (third round)
4. (Italy) Paolo Lorenzi (final)
5. (Japan) Taro Daniel (quarterfinals)
6. (Italy) Lorenzo Giustino (second round)
7. (Italy) Alessandro Giannessi (quarterfinals)
8. (Italy) Gianluca Mager (champion)
9. (Italy) Filippo Baldi (second round)
10. (Italy) Federico Gaio (third round)
11. (Spain) Mario Vilella Martínez (third round)
12. (Argentina) Marco Trungelliti (third round)
13. (Spain) Tommy Robredo (quarterfinals)
14. (Italy) Stefano Napolitano (third round)
15. (France) Elliot Benchetrit (third round)
16. (Argentina) Carlos Berlocq (third round)

== Draw ==
=== Key ===
- Q = Qualifier
- WC = Wild card
- LL = Lucky loser
- Alt = Alternate
- SE = Special exempt
- PR = Protected ranking
- ITF = ITF entry
- JE = Junior exempt
- w/o = Walkover
- r = Retired
- d = Defaulted
- SR = Special ranking

=== Finals ===
Quarterfinals
1	(Spain) Alejandro Davidovich Fokina	6	6
7	(Italy) Alessandro Giannessi	2	1
4	(Italy) Paolo Lorenzi	5	6	6
(Argentina) Andrea Collarini	7	4	1
8	(Italy) Gianluca Mager	6	6^{4}	6
13	(Spain) Tommy Robredo	1	7^{7}	1
5	(Japan) Taro Daniel	6^{5}	2
2	(Spain) Jaume Munar	7^{7}	6

Semifinals
1	(Spain) Alejandro Davidovich Fokina	3	6	5
4	(Italy) Paolo Lorenzi	6	4	7
8	(Italy) Gianluca Mager	6	6
2	(Spain) Jaume Munar	4	2

Final
4	(Italy) Paolo Lorenzi	0	7^{7}	5
8	(Italy) Gianluca Mager	6	6^{4}	7

=== Top half ===
==== Section 1 ====
First round
(Germany) Jeremy Jahn	6	6
(Italy) E Dalla Valle	3	4
(France) M Chazal	6	6
(Japan) Y Shimizu	3	3
(Sweden) C Lindell	1	6^{8}
(Argentina) H Casanova	6	7^{10}
WC	(Italy) Giacomo Dambrosi	0	5
WC	(Italy) Pietro Rondoni	6	5^{r}

Second round
1	(Spain) A Davidovich Fokina	7	7
(Germany) J Jahn	5	5
(France) M Chazal	3	6	4
15	(France) E Benchetrit	6	3	6
12	(Argentina) M Trungelliti	5	6	6
(Argentina) H Casanova	7	3	4
WC	(Italy) G Dambrosi	4	4
7	(Italy) A Giannessi	6	6

Third round
1	(Spain) A Davidovich Fokina	6	6
15	(France) E Benchetrit	2	2
12	(Argentina) M Trungelliti	6^{4}	1
7	(Italy) A Giannessi	7^{7}	6

Quarterfinals
1	(Spain) A Davidovich Fokina	6	6
7	(Italy) A Giannessi	2	1

==== Section 2 ====
First round
(Spain) Carlos Boluda-Purkiss	5	0^{r}
(Italy) A Arnaboldi	7	2
(Argentina) P Cachin	6	3	2
(Italy) R Bonadio	4	6	6
(Italy) R Brancaccio	6	6
Q	(Brazil) F Romboli	3	2
(Brazil) T Bellucci	3	3
(Argentina) A Collarini	6	6

Second round
4	(Italy) P Lorenzi	6	7
(Italy) A Arnaboldi	3	5
(Italy) R Bonadio	1	1
16	(Argentina) C Berlocq	6	6
11	(Spain) M Vilella Martínez	6	6
(Italy) R Brancaccio	1	4
(Argentina) A Collarini	7^{7}	5	6
6	(Italy) L Giustino	6^{5}	7	3

Third round
4	(Italy) P Lorenzi	6	6
16	(Argentina) C Berlocq	4	3
11	(Spain) M Vilella Martínez	7^{7}	4	2
(Argentina) A Collarini	6^{4}	6	6

Quarterfinals
4	(Italy) P Lorenzi	5	6	6
(Argentina) A Collarini	7	4	1

=== Bottom half ===
==== Section 3 ====
First round
(Spain) O Roca Batalla	6	6
WC	(Italy) M Arnaldi	3	0
(Germany) Peter Heller	7^{7}	6
(Brazil) Jordan Correia	6^{4}	2
(Italy) G Quinzi	2	6	3
Q	(Brazil) Oscar José Gutierrez	6	1	6
WC	(Italy) Gabriele Felline	1	0
(Spain) Eduard Esteve Lobato	6	6

Second round
8	(Italy) G Mager	6	6
(Spain) O Roca Batalla	4	3
(Germany) P Heller	3	6	7
9	(Italy) F Baldi	6	4	5
13	(Spain) T Robredo	6	6
Q	(Brazil) OJ Gutierrez	0	1
(Spain) E Esteve Lobato	6^{4}	3
3	(Slovakia) A Martin	7^{7}	6

Third round
8	(Italy) G Mager	6	7^{7}
(Germany) P Heller	4	6^{3}
13	(Spain) T Robredo	7^{7}	3	6
3	(Slovakia) A Martin	6^{1}	6	3

Quarterfinals
8	(Italy) G Mager	6	6^{4}	6
13	(Spain) T Robredo	1	7^{7}	1

==== Section 4 ====
First round
PR	(Spain) D Muñoz de la Nava	5	6	7^{8}
(Switzerland) S Ehrat	7	4	6^{6}
(Spain) D Gimeno Traver	3	5
(Croatia) V Galović	6	7
(Sweden) M Eriksson	6	7^{7}
WC	(Italy) F Arnaboldi	4	6^{3}
(Italy) GM Moroni	6	4
(Italy) A Pellegrino	1	1^{r}

Second round
5	(Japan) T Daniel	6	6
PR	(Spain) D Muñoz de la Nava	3	4
(Croatia) V Galović	4	4
10	(Italy) F Gaio	6	6
14	(Italy) S Napolitano	6	6
(Sweden) M Eriksson	4	4
(Italy) GM Moroni	5	2
2	(Spain) J Munar	7	6

Third round
5	(Japan) T Daniel	7^{7}	3	6
10	(Italy) F Gaio	6^{4}	6	3
14	(Italy) S Napolitano	4	2
2	(Spain) J Munar	6	6

Quarterfinals
5	(Japan) T Daniel	6^{5}	2
2	(Spain) J Munar	7^{7}	6
