= 2014 Challenger Pulcra Lachiter Biella – Singles =

Singles
- 2014 Challenger Pulcra Lachiter Biella

Final
- Champion: (Italy) Matteo Viola
- Runner-up: (Italy) Filippo Volandri
- Score: 7–5, 6–1

Events
Singles	Doubles
← 2013 ·	Challenger Pulcra Lachiter Biella	· 2015 →

Björn Phau was the defending champion from the last tournament in 2010, but chose not to compete this year.

Matteo Viola won the title, defeating Filippo Volandri 7–5, 6–1 in the final.

== Seeds ==
1. (France) Benoît Paire (withdrew due to left knee injury)
2. (Italy) Filippo Volandri (final)
3. (Italy) Marco Cecchinato (semifinals)
4. (Italy) Andrea Arnaboldi (quarterfinals)
5. (Italy) Matteo Viola (champion)
6. (Australia) Jason Kubler (quarterfinals)
7. (Switzerland) Henri Laaksonen (quarterfinals)
8. (Austria) Dennis Novak (second round)

== Draw ==
=== Key ===
- Q = Qualifier
- WC = Wild card
- LL = Lucky loser
- Alt = Alternate
- SE = Special exempt
- PR = Protected ranking
- ITF = ITF entry
- JE = Junior exempt
- w/o = Walkover
- r = Retired
- d = Defaulted
- SR = Special ranking

=== Finals ===
Semifinals
LL	(Monaco) Benjamin Balleret	7^{9}	6^{1}	3
5	(Italy) Matteo Viola	6^{7}	7^{7}	6
3	(Italy) Marco Cecchinato	3	1
2	(Italy) Filippo Volandri	6	6

Final
5	(Italy) Matteo Viola	7	6
2	(Italy) Filippo Volandri	5	1

=== Top half ===
First round
LL	(Monaco) B Balleret	5	7^{7}	6
Q	(Croatia) V Galović	7	6^{4}	3
(Russia) A Zaitcev	6	6
(Portugal) P Sousa	3	4
(France) M Teixeira	6	2	6
(Argentina) P Cachin	1	6	2
(Italy) A Giannessi	6^{4}	6	2
7/Alt	(Switzerland) H Laaksonen	7^{7}	4	6
4	(Italy) A Arnaboldi	6	6^{4}	6
WC	(Italy) S Napolitano	2	7^{7}	4
Q	(Italy) L Sonego	6	6
WC	(Italy) Erik Crepaldi	2	3
(France) Julien Obry	6	3	6
(Serbia) N Čačić	4	6	2
WC	(Italy) M Bortolotti	4	1
5	(Italy) M Viola	6	6

Second round
LL	(Monaco) B Balleret	6	6
(Russia) A Zaitcev	2	0
(France) M Teixeira	4	7	2
7/Alt	(Switzerland) H Laaksonen	6	5	6
4	(Italy) A Arnaboldi	7^{7}	6
Q	(Italy) L Sonego	6^{5}	4
(France) J Obry	3	2
5	(Italy) M Viola	6	6

Quarterfinals
LL	(Monaco) B Balleret	7^{7}	6
7/Alt	(Switzerland) H Laaksonen	6^{2}	3
4	(Italy) A Arnaboldi	6	4	2
5	(Italy) M Viola	2	6	6

Semifinals
LL	(Monaco) B Balleret	7^{9}	6^{1}	3
5	(Italy) M Viola	6^{7}	7^{7}	6

=== Bottom half ===
First round
8	(Austria) D Novak	6	6
WC	(Italy) Pietro Licciardi	3	4
PR	(Switzerland) S Ehrat	3	4
(Czech Republic) J Hájek	6	6
(Italy) M Trevisan	6	4	0^{r}
(Belgium) Y Reuter	1	6	3
Q	(Serbia) N Ćirić	6^{1}	0^{r}
3	(Italy) M Cecchinato	7^{7}	2
6	(Australia) J Kubler	7^{7}	6
(Italy) M Donati	6^{3}	3
Q	(France) M Chazal	6^{3}	7^{7}	7
(Italy) W Trusendi	7^{7}	6^{5}	5
(Czech Republic) M Michalička	6	3	6
(Italy) G Naso	4	6	2
(Italy) F Gaio	3	3
2	(Italy) F Volandri	6	6

Second round
8	(Austria) D Novak	3	1
(Czech Republic) J Hájek	6	6
(Belgium) Y Reuter	6^{5}	1
3	(Italy) M Cecchinato	7^{7}	6
6	(Australia) J Kubler	6	6
Q	(France) M Chazal	4	4
(Czech Republic) M Michalička	4	6	2
2	(Italy) F Volandri	6	1	6

Quarterfinals
(Czech Republic) J Hájek	1	3
3	(Italy) M Cecchinato	6	6
6	(Australia) J Kubler	2	1
2	(Italy) F Volandri	6	6

Semifinals
3	(Italy) M Cecchinato	3	1
2	(Italy) F Volandri	6	6
