= 2015 Challenger Pulcra Lachiter Biella – Doubles =

Doubles
- 2015 Challenger Pulcra Lachiter Biella

Final
- Champion: (Slovakia) Andrej Martin (Chile) Hans Podlipnik-Castillo
- Runner-up: (Romania) Alexandru-Daniel Carpen (Croatia) Dino Marcan
- Score: 7–5, 1–6, [10–8]

Events
Singles	Doubles
← 2014 ·	Challenger Pulcra Lachiter Biella	· 2016 →

Italians Marco Cecchinato and Matteo Viola were the defending champions, but they did not participate this year.

Andrej Martin and Hans Podlipnik-Castillo won the tournament, defeating Alexandru-Daniel Carpen and Dino Marcan in the final, 7–5, 1–6, [10–8].

== Seeds ==
1. (Mexico) César Ramírez / (Mexico) Miguel Ángel Reyes-Varela (quarterfinals)
2. (United States) James Cerretani / (Romania) Costin Pavăl (semifinals)
3. (Slovakia) Andrej Martin / (Chile) Hans Podlipnik-Castillo (champions)
4. (Romania) Alexandru-Daniel Carpen / (Croatia) Dino Marcan (final)

== Draw ==
=== Key ===
- Q = Qualifier
- WC = Wild card
- LL = Lucky loser
- Alt = Alternate
- SE = Special exempt
- PR = Protected ranking
- ITF = ITF entry
- JE = Junior exempt
- w/o = Walkover
- r = Retired
- d = Defaulted
- SR = Special ranking

First round
1	(Mexico) C Ramírez (Mexico) MÁ Reyes-Varela	6	6
(Netherlands) S Fransen (Argentina) N Kicker	3	3
(Serbia) I Bozoljac (Italy) S Napolitano	6	6
PR	(Brazil) F Neis (Portugal) P Sousa	4	4
3	(Slovakia) A Martin (Chile) H Podlipnik-Castillo	6	6
WC	(Italy) S Caruso (Italy) L Sonego	2	4
(Italy) A Giannessi (Italy) A Motti	4	7	[8]
WC	(Italy) M Bortolotti (Italy) G Quinzi	6	5	[10]
(Bolivia) H Dellien (Dominican Republic) J Hernández	6	6
(Poland) G Panfil (Chile) J Peralta	1	4
(Italy) R Bellotti (Austria) D Novak	4	1
4	(Romania) Alexandru-Daniel Carpen (Croatia) D Marcan	6	6
(Bosnia and Herzegovina) T Brkić (Argentina) F Coria	3	4
(Italy) G Naso (Italy) Matteo Volante	6	6
WC	(Croatia) V Galović (Italy) Filippo Leonardi	1	4
2	(United States) J Cerretani (Romania) C Pavăl	6	6

Quarterfinals
1	(Mexico) C Ramírez (Mexico) MÁ Reyes-Varela	5	2
(Serbia) I Bozoljac (Italy) S Napolitano	7	6
3	(Slovakia) A Martin (Chile) H Podlipnik-Castillo	6	6
WC	(Italy) M Bortolotti (Italy) G Quinzi	0	3
(Bolivia) H Dellien (Dominican Republic) J Hernández	5	7	[11]
4	(Romania) A-D Carpen (Croatia) D Marcan	7	5	[13]
(Italy) G Naso (Italy) M Volante	2	2
2	(United States) J Cerretani (Romania) C Pavăl	6	6

Semifinals
(Serbia) I Bozoljac (Italy) S Napolitano	6^{3}	6^{4}
3	(Slovakia) A Martin (Chile) H Podlipnik-Castillo	7^{7}	7^{7}
4	(Romania) A-D Carpen (Croatia) D Marcan	7	4	[12]
2	(United States) J Cerretani (Romania) C Pavăl	5	6	[10]

Final
3	(Slovakia) A Martin (Chile) H Podlipnik-Castillo	7	1	[10]
4	(Romania) A-D Carpen (Croatia) D Marcan	5	6	[8]
