= 2021 Biella Challenger V – Doubles =

Doubles
- 2021 Biella Challenger V

Final
- Champions: (Sweden) André Göransson (United States) Nathaniel Lammons
- Runners-up: (Brazil) Rafael Matos (Brazil) Felipe Meligeni Alves
- Score: 7–6^{(7–3)}, 6–3

Events
| Singles | Doubles |
| ← 2020 · | Biella Challenger | · 2021 → |

Lloyd Glasspool and Matt Reid were the defending champions but chose not to defend their title.

André Göransson and Nathaniel Lammons won the title after defeating Rafael Matos and Felipe Meligeni Alves 7–6^{(7–3)}, 6–3 in the final.

== Seeds ==
1. (Sweden) André Göransson / (United States) Nathaniel Lammons (champions)
2. (Brazil) Rafael Matos / (Brazil) Felipe Meligeni Alves (final)
3. (Spain) Sergio Martos Gornés / (New Zealand) Artem Sitak (semifinals)
4. (France) Sadio Doumbia / (France) Fabien Reboul (semifinals)

== Draw ==
=== Key ===
- Q = Qualifier
- WC = Wild card
- LL = Lucky loser
- Alt = Alternate
- SE = Special exempt
- PR = Protected ranking
- ITF = ITF entry
- JE = Junior exempt
- w/o = Walkover
- r = Retired
- d = Defaulted
- SR = Special ranking

First round
1 | (Sweden) A Göransson (United States) N Lammons | 6 | 6
(Japan) T Ito (Japan) G Soeda | 1 | 0
WC | (Italy) Pietro Buscaglione (Italy) Pietro Rondoni | 2 | 2
(India) S Balaji (India) J Nedunchezhiyan | 6 | 6
4 | (France) S Doumbia (France) F Reboul | 7^{7} | 6^{3} | [10]
WC | (Italy) M Bortolotti (Colombia) C Rodríguez | 6^{5} | 7^{7} | [2]
(Belgium) R Bemelmans (France) A Müller | 2 | 2
(Belgium) K Coppejans (Brazil) J Menezes | 6 | 6
(Switzerland) L Margaroli (Canada) A Shamasdin | 4 | 6 | [10]
(Bolivia) H Dellien (Bolivia) F Zeballos | 6 | 4 | [7]
(Argentina) L Mayer (Peru) JP Varillas | 3 | 6^{4}
3 | (Spain) S Martos Gornés (New Zealand) A Sitak | 6 | 7^{7}
(Argentina) G Andreozzi (Argentina) G Durán | 6^{5} | 6 | [3]
(Portugal) J Domingues (Portugal) P Sousa | 7^{7} | 3 | [10]
WC | (Russia) T Gabashvili (Italy) L Vanni | 4 | 1
2 | (Brazil) R Matos (Brazil) F Meligeni Alves | 6 | 6

Quarterfinals
1 | (Sweden) A Göransson (United States) N Lammons | 6 | 3 | [10]
(India) S Balaji (India) J Nedunchezhiyan | 4 | 6 | [8]
4 | (France) S Doumbia (France) F Reboul | 6 | 6
(Belgium) K Coppejans (Brazil) J Menezes | 4 | 1
(Switzerland) L Margaroli (Canada) A Shamasdin | 1 | 6^{4}
3 | (Spain) S Martos Gornés (New Zealand) A Sitak | 6 | 7^{7}
(Portugal) J Domingues (Portugal) P Sousa | 5 | 3
2 | (Brazil) R Matos (Brazil) F Meligeni Alves | 7 | 6

Semifinals
1 | (Sweden) A Göransson (United States) N Lammons | 7^{10} | 6
4 | (France) S Doumbia (France) F Reboul | 6^{8} | 3
3 | (Spain) S Martos Gornés (New Zealand) A Sitak | 2 | 2
2 | (Brazil) R Matos (Brazil) F Meligeni Alves | 6 | 6

Final
1 | (Sweden) A Göransson (United States) N Lammons | 7^{7} | 6
2 | (Brazil) R Matos (Brazil) F Meligeni Alves | 6^{3} | 3
