= 2016 Thindown Challenger Biella – Doubles =

Doubles
- 2016 Thindown Challenger Biella

Final
- Champions: (Germany) Andre Begemann (India) Leander Paes
- Runners-up: (Slovakia) Andrej Martin (Chile) Hans Podlipnik
- Score: 6–4, 6–4

Events
Singles	Doubles
← 2015 ·	Thindown Challenger Biella	· 2017 →

Andrej Martin and Hans Podlipnik were the defending champions but lost in the final to Andre Begemann and Leander Paes by a score of 6–4, 6–4.

== Seeds ==
1. (Slovakia) Andrej Martin / (Chile) Hans Podlipnik (final)
2. (United States) James Cerretani / (Austria) Philipp Oswald (semifinals)
3. (Germany) Andre Begemann / (India) Leander Paes (champions)
4. (Italy) Andrea Arnaboldi / (Croatia) Antonio Šančić (quarterfinals)

== Draw ==
=== Key ===
- Q = Qualifier
- WC = Wild card
- LL = Lucky loser
- Alt = Alternate
- SE = Special exempt
- PR = Protected ranking
- ITF = ITF entry
- JE = Junior exempt
- w/o = Walkover
- r = Retired
- d = Defaulted
- SR = Special ranking

First round
1	(Slovakia) A Martin (Chile) H Podlipnik	6	4	[10]
WC	(Italy) G Mager (Italy) L Sonego	4	6	[8]
(Argentina) N Kicker (Argentina) JP Paz	2	6	[6]
(Italy) R Ghedin (Italy) A Motti	6	4	[10]
4	(Italy) A Arnaboldi (Croatia) A Šančić	6	6
(Italy) M Donati (Italy) S Napolitano	3	4
(Russia) K Khachanov (Russia) A Rublev	6	6
WC	(Bosnia and Herzegovina) T Brkić (Croatia) V Galović	3	4
(Brazil) F Neis (Brazil) J Souza	6	7^{7}
(Argentina) A Collarini (Serbia) D Petrović	4	6^{5}
(Austria) M Linzer (Spain) E López-Pérez	1	4
3	(Germany) A Begemann (India) L Paes	6	6
(Argentina) G Andreozzi (Peru) S Galdós	7	3	[12]
WC	(Italy) Francisco Bahamonde (Italy) A Pellegrino	5	6	[10]
(Croatia) I Sabanov (Croatia) M Sabanov	2	2
2	(United States) J Cerretani (Austria) P Oswald	6	6

Quarterfinals
1	(Slovakia) A Martin (Chile) H Podlipnik	6	4	[10]
(Italy) R Ghedin (Italy) A Motti	2	6	[4]
4	(Italy) A Arnaboldi (Croatia) A Šančić	3	6^{5}
(Russia) K Khachanov (Russia) A Rublev	6	7^{7}
(Brazil) F Neis (Brazil) J Souza	4	7	[8]
3	(Germany) A Begemann (India) L Paes	6	5	[10]
(Argentina) G Andreozzi (Peru) S Galdós	4	4
2	(United States) J Cerretani (Austria) P Oswald	6	6

Semifinals
1	(Slovakia) A Martin (Chile) H Podlipnik	6	1	[10]
(Russia) K Khachanov (Russia) A Rublev	3	6	[6]
3	(Germany) A Begemann (India) L Paes	6	6
2	(United States) J Cerretani (Austria) P Oswald	3	4

Final
1	(Slovakia) A Martin (Chile) H Podlipnik	4	4
3	(Germany) A Begemann (India) L Paes	6	6
