= 2017 Thindown Challenger Biella – Singles =

Singles
- 2017 Thindown Challenger Biella

Final
- Champion: (Serbia) Filip Krajinović
- Runner-up: (Italy) Salvatore Caruso
- Score: 6–3, 6–2

Events
Singles	Doubles
← 2016 ·	Thindown Challenger Biella	· 2018 →

Federico Gaio was the defending champion but lost in the second round to João Souza.

Filip Krajinović won the title after defeating Salvatore Caruso 6–3, 6–2 in the final.

== Seeds ==
1. (Italy) Marco Cecchinato (quarterfinals)
2. (Spain) Guillermo García López (second round)
3. (Argentina) Leonardo Mayer (withdrew)
4. (Argentina) Guido Andreozzi (first round, retired)
5. (Serbia) Filip Krajinović (champion)
6. (Brazil) João Souza (semifinals)
7. (Italy) Stefano Travaglia (quarterfinals)
8. (Spain) Roberto Carballés Baena (second round)

== Draw ==
=== Key ===
- Q = Qualifier
- WC = Wild card
- LL = Lucky loser
- Alt = Alternate
- SE = Special exempt
- PR = Protected ranking
- ITF = ITF entry
- JE = Junior exempt
- w/o = Walkover
- r = Retired
- d = Defaulted
- SR = Special ranking

=== Finals ===
Semifinals
5	(Serbia) Filip Krajinović	6	7^{9}
6	(Brazil) João Souza	4	6^{7}
Q	(Italy) Andrea Arnaboldi	6	5	5
(Italy) Salvatore Caruso	3	7	7

Final
5	(Serbia) Filip Krajinović	6	6
(Italy) Salvatore Caruso	3	2

=== Top half ===
First round
1	(Italy) M Cecchinato	7	6
Q	(Italy) R Marcora	5	4
WC	(Italy) Pietro Rondoni	6	2	6
Q	(Russia) I Gakhov	4	6	3
(Spain) R Ramírez Hidalgo	2	2
WC	(Italy) M Donati	6	6
(Spain) D Gimeno Traver	1	4
5	(Serbia) F Krajinović	6	6
LL	(Bosnia and Herzegovina) T Brkić	6	1	6
(France) M Janvier	4	6	3
Alt	(Croatia) V Galović	6^{3}	1
LL	(Sweden) M Ymer	7^{7}	6
(Italy) F Gaio	4	6	6
(France) C Hemery	6	2	4
(Hungary) A Balázs	4	4
6	(Brazil) J Souza	6	6

Second round
1	(Italy) M Cecchinato	7	6
WC	(Italy) P Rondoni	5	3
WC	(Italy) M Donati	2	6^{1}
5	(Serbia) F Krajinović	6	7^{7}
LL	(Bosnia and Herzegovina) T Brkić	6^{5}	2
LL	(Sweden) M Ymer	7^{7}	6
(Italy) F Gaio	6	6^{9}	4
6	(Brazil) J Souza	2	7^{11}	6

Quarterfinals
1	(Italy) M Cecchinato	4	2
5	(Serbia) F Krajinović	6	6
LL	(Sweden) M Ymer	0	2
6	(Brazil) J Souza	6	6

Semifinals
5	(Serbia) F Krajinović	6	7^{9}
6	(Brazil) J Souza	4	6^{7}

=== Bottom half ===
First round
7	(Italy) S Travaglia	7^{7}	2	7
WC	(Italy) A Pellegrino	6^{5}	6	5
(France) C Lestienne	7	4	6
(Italy) L Giustino	5	6	4
SE	(Italy) M Viola	4	3
Q	(Italy) G Mager	6	6
Q	(Italy) A Arnaboldi	6^{3}	7^{7}	4
4	(Argentina) G Andreozzi	7^{7}	6^{3}	3^{r}
8	(Spain) R Carballés Baena	6	4	6
(Italy) S Napolitano	2	6	4
(Argentina) F Coria	6	6
(France) S Robert	3	4
(Italy) S Caruso	7	6
(Belgium) Y Reuter	5	3
WC	(Italy) L Sonego	3	6	4
2	(Spain) G García López	6	2	6

Second round
7	(Italy) S Travaglia	7	6
(France) C Lestienne	5	4
Q	(Italy) G Mager	4	4
Q	(Italy) A Arnaboldi	6	6
8	(Spain) R Carballés Baena	5	2
(Argentina) F Coria	7	6
(Italy) S Caruso	1	6	6
2	(Spain) G García López	6	4	2

Quarterfinals
7	(Italy) S Travaglia	6	6^{5}	6^{3}
Q	(Italy) A Arnaboldi	4	7^{7}	7^{7}
(Argentina) F Coria	3	7^{7}	3
(Italy) S Caruso	6	6^{3}	6

Semifinals
Q	(Italy) A Arnaboldi	6	5	5
(Italy) S Caruso	3	7	7
