= 2020 Thindown Challenger Biella – Singles =

Singles
- 2020 Thindown Challenger Biella

Final
- Champion: (Argentina) Facundo Bagnis
- Runner-up: (Slovenia) Blaž Kavčič
- Score: 6–7^{(4–7)}, 6–4, 0–0 ret.

Events
| Singles | Doubles |
| ← 2019 · | Thindown Challenger Biella | · 2021 → |

Gianluca Mager was the defending champion but chose not to defend his title.

Facundo Bagnis won the title after Blaž Kavčič retired before the start of the third set, with the first two sets split at 6–7^{(4–7)}, 6–4.

== Seeds ==
1. (Brazil) Thiago Seyboth Wild (first round)
2. (Australia) Christopher O'Connell (semifinals)
3. (India) Sumit Nagal (first round)
4. (Argentina) Facundo Bagnis (champion)
5. (Italy) Paolo Lorenzi (first round)
6. (Italy) Federico Gaio (first round)
7. (India) Prajnesh Gunneswaran (first round)
8. (Peru) Juan Pablo Varillas (first round)

== Draw ==
=== Key ===
- Q = Qualifier
- WC = Wild card
- LL = Lucky loser
- Alt = Alternate
- SE = Special exempt
- PR = Protected ranking
- ITF = ITF entry
- JE = Junior exempt
- w/o = Walkover
- r = Retired
- d = Defaulted
- SR = Special ranking

=== Finals ===
Semifinals
(Slovenia) Blaž Rola | 7 | 4 | 1
PR | (Slovenia) Blaž Kavčič | 5 | 6 | 6
4 | (Argentina) Facundo Bagnis | 6 | 6
2 | (Australia) Christopher O'Connell | 4 | 4

Final
PR | (Slovenia) Blaž Kavčič | 7^{7} | 4 | 0^{r}
4 | (Argentina) Facundo Bagnis | 6^{4} | 6 | 0

=== Top half ===
First round
1 | (Brazil) T Seyboth Wild | 6^{6} | 6^{3}
(Slovenia) B Rola | 7^{8} | 7^{7}
(Argentina) A Collarini | 6 | 4 | 6
Q | (Italy) A Arnaboldi | 2 | 6 | 2
WC | (Switzerland) R Bertola | 7 | 7
(Spain) T Robredo | 5 | 5
(Italy) M Viola | 4 | 7^{7} | 6
6 | (Italy) F Gaio | 6 | 6^{5} | 2
3 | (India) S Nagal | 6^{4} | 4
PR | (Slovenia) B Kavčič | 7^{7} | 6
(Australia) A Harris | 1 | 2
Q | (Chinese Taipei) C-h Tseng | 6 | 6
(Italy) GM Moroni | 5 | 6 | 3
Q | (Italy) A Pellegrino | 7 | 3 | 6
(United States) M Cressy | 7^{7} | 6
7 | (India) P Gunneswaran | 6^{5} | 4

Second round
(Slovenia) B Rola | 6 | 6
(Argentina) A Collarini | 0 | 3
WC | (Switzerland) R Bertola | 1 | 5
(Italy) M Viola | 6 | 7
PR | (Slovenia) B Kavčič | 3 | 6 | 6
Q | (Chinese Taipei) C-h Tseng | 6 | 3 | 3
Q | (Italy) A Pellegrino | 7^{7} | 6^{8} | 0
(United States) M Cressy | 6^{3} | 7^{10} | 6

Quarterfinals
(Slovenia) B Rola | 6 | 7
(Italy) M Viola | 2 | 5
PR | (Slovenia) B Kavčič | 6 | 6
(United States) M Cressy | 4 | 4

Semifinals
(Slovenia) B Rola | 7 | 4 | 1
PR | (Slovenia) B Kavčič | 5 | 6 | 6

=== Bottom half ===
First round
8 | (Peru) JP Varillas | 6 | 6^{8} | 6^{2}
(Spain) C Alcaraz | 2 | 7^{10} | 7^{7}
(Slovakia) L Lacko | 2 | 2
(Slovakia) F Horanský | 6 | 6
WC | (Italy) Gabriele Felline | 0 | 1
Q | (France) A Müller | 6 | 6
(Dominican Republic) R Cid Subervi | 5 | 1
4 | (Argentina) F Bagnis | 7 | 6
5 | (Italy) P Lorenzi | 4 | 3
WC | (Italy) S Napolitano | 6 | 6
(Uzbekistan) D Istomin | 7^{7} | 6
(Ukraine) I Marchenko | 6^{0} | 2
(Spain) G García López | 3 | 2
(Argentina) JP Ficovich | 6 | 6
(India) R Ramanathan | 4 | 2
2 | (Australia) C O'Connell | 6 | 6

Second round
(Spain) C Alcaraz | 3 | 4
(Slovakia) F Horanský | 6 | 6
Q | (France) A Müller | 3 | 4
4 | (Argentina) F Bagnis | 6 | 6
WC | (Italy) S Napolitano | 3 | 4
(Uzbekistan) D Istomin | 6 | 6
(Argentina) JP Ficovich | 7 | 4 | 1
2 | (Australia) C O'Connell | 5 | 6 | 6

Quarterfinals
(Slovakia) F Horanský | 5 | 1
4 | (Argentina) F Bagnis | 7 | 6
(Uzbekistan) D Istomin | 3 | 3
2 | (Australia) C O'Connell | 6 | 6

Semifinals
4 | (Argentina) F Bagnis | 6 | 6
2 | (Australia) C O'Connell | 4 | 4
