= 2018 Thindown Challenger Biella =

- Date: 17–23 September 2018
- Edition: 11th
- Surface: Clay
- Location: Biella, Italy

Champions

Singles
- (Argentina) Federico Delbonis

Doubles
- (Brazil) Fabrício Neis / (Spain) David Vega Hernández
← 2017 ·	Thindown Challenger Biella	· 2019 →

The 2018 Thindown Challenger Biella was a professional tennis tournament played on outdoor red clay courts. It was part of the 2018 ATP Challenger Tour. It took place in Biella, Italy between 17 and 23 September 2018.

== Singles main-draw entrants ==
=== Seeds ===
Country	Player	Rank^{1}	Seed
ESP	Roberto Carballés Baena	94	1
ARG	Federico Delbonis	100	2
ITA	Paolo Lorenzi	113	3
BRA	Thiago Monteiro	117	4
ARG	Marco Trungelliti	134	5
ITA	Stefano Travaglia	147	6
POR	Gastão Elias	154	7
ESP	Daniel Gimeno Traver	158	8

- Rankings are as of 10 September 2018.

=== Other entrants ===
The following players received wildcards into the singles main draw:

- (Italy) Enrico Dalla Valle
- (Italy) Paolo Lorenzi
- (Italy) Andrea Pellegrino
- (Italy) Pietro Rondoni

The following players received entry into the singles main draw as special exempts:

- (Argentina) Facundo Argüello
- (Spain) Alejandro Davidovich Fokina

The following player received entry into the singles main draw as an alternate:

- (Brazil) Thiago Monteiro

The following players received entry from the qualifying draw:

- (Chile) Marcelo Tomás Barrios Vera
- (France) Mathias Bourgue
- (France) Alexandre Müller
- (Czech Republic) Jan Šátral

The following players received entry as lucky losers:

- (Brazil) Oscar José Gutierrez
- (Peru) Juan Pablo Varillas

== Champions ==
=== Singles ===
- (Argentina) Federico Delbonis def. (Italy) Stefano Napolitano 6–4, 6–3.

=== Doubles ===
- (Brazil) Fabrício Neis / (Spain) David Vega Hernández def. (Australia) Rameez Junaid / (India) Purav Raja 6–4, 6–4.
