= 2017 Thindown Challenger Biella – Doubles =

Doubles
- 2017 Thindown Challenger Biella

Final
- Champions: (Hungary) Attila Balázs (Brazil) Fabiano de Paula
- Runners-up: (Sweden) Johan Brunström (Croatia) Dino Marcan
- Score: 5–7, 6–4, [10–4]

Events
Singles	Doubles
← 2016 ·	Thindown Challenger Biella	· 2018 →

This was a doubles tennis event in a professional tennis tournament held in Biella, Italy, in the summer of 2017.

Andre Begemann and Leander Paes were the defending champions but chose not to defend their title.

Attila Balázs and Fabiano de Paula won the title after defeating Johan Brunström and Dino Marcan 5–7, 6–4, [10–4] in the final.

== Seeds ==
1. (Sweden) Johan Brunström / (Croatia) Dino Marcan (final)
2. (Netherlands) Sander Arends / (Croatia) Antonio Šančić (quarterfinals)
3. (Belgium) Sander Gillé / (Belgium) Joran Vliegen (quarterfinals)
4. (Croatia) Marin Draganja / (Croatia) Tomislav Draganja (first round)

== Draw ==
=== Key ===
- Q = Qualifier
- WC = Wild card
- LL = Lucky loser
- Alt = Alternate
- SE = Special exempt
- PR = Protected ranking
- ITF = ITF entry
- JE = Junior exempt
- w/o = Walkover
- r = Retired
- d = Defaulted
- SR = Special ranking

First round
1	(Sweden) J Brunström (Croatia) D Marcan	6	7
(Italy) S Caruso (Croatia) V Galović	2	5
(Monaco) R Arneodo (Italy) R Ghedin	6	6
(Spain) R Carballés Baena (Argentina) F Coria	2	4
4	(Croatia) M Draganja (Croatia) T Draganja	6	4	[7]
WC	(Italy) J Ocleppo (Italy) A Vavassori	3	6	[10]
(Italy) M Cecchinato (Spain) R Ramírez Hidalgo	7^{11}	6
(France) C Hemery (France) S Robert	6^{9}	4
WC	(Italy) M Donati (Italy) S Napolitano	4	6	[10]
(Argentina) G Andreozzi (Brazil) J Souza	6	4	[8]
(Italy) A Arnaboldi (Uruguay) A Behar	3	3
3	(Belgium) S Gillé (Belgium) J Vliegen	6	6
(Hungary) A Balázs (Brazil) F de Paula	6	6
WC	(Italy) F Gaio (Italy) A Pellegrino	3	2
(Italy) A Motti (Italy) S Travaglia	3	3
2	(Netherlands) S Arends (Croatia) A Šančić	6	6

Quarterfinals
1	(Sweden) J Brunström (Croatia) D Marcan	6	6
(Monaco) R Arneodo (Italy) R Ghedin	4	4
WC	(Italy) J Ocleppo (Italy) A Vavassori	6	1	[18]
(Italy) M Cecchinato (Spain) R Ramírez Hidalgo	4	6	[16]
WC	(Italy) M Donati (Italy) S Napolitano	7^{8}	7^{7}
3	(Belgium) S Gillé (Belgium) J Vliegen	6^{6}	6^{5}
(Hungary) A Balázs (Brazil) F de Paula	6	6
2	(Netherlands) S Arends (Croatia) A Šančić	1	3

Semifinals
1	(Sweden) J Brunström (Croatia) D Marcan	6	7
WC	(Italy) J Ocleppo (Italy) A Vavassori	4	5
WC	(Italy) M Donati (Italy) S Napolitano	4	3
(Hungary) A Balázs (Brazil) F de Paula	6	6

Final
1	(Sweden) J Brunström (Croatia) D Marcan	7	4	[4]
(Hungary) A Balázs (Brazil) F de Paula	5	6	[10]
