= 2021 Biella Challenger VI – Doubles =

Doubles
- 2021 Biella Challenger VI

Final
- Champions: (United States) Evan King (Germany) Julian Lenz
- Runners-up: (Poland) Karol Drzewiecki (Spain) Sergio Martos Gornés
- Score: 3–6, 6–3, [11–9]

Events
Singles	Doubles
← 2021 ·	Biella Challenger	· 2021 →

André Göransson and Nathaniel Lammons were the defending champions but chose not to defend their title.

Evan King and Julian Lenz won the title after defeating Karol Drzewiecki and Sergio Martos Gornés 3–6, 6–3, [11–9] in the final.

== Seeds ==
1. (United States) Evan King / (Germany) Julian Lenz (champions)
2. (Poland) Karol Drzewiecki / (Spain) Sergio Martos Gornés (final)
3. (Brazil) Felipe Meligeni Alves / (Brazil) João Menezes (quarterfinals, withdrew)
4. (Peru) Sergio Galdós / (Bolivia) Federico Zeballos (first round)

== Draw ==
=== Key ===
- Q = Qualifier
- WC = Wild card
- LL = Lucky loser
- Alt = Alternate
- SE = Special exempt
- PR = Protected ranking
- ITF = ITF entry
- JE = Junior exempt
- w/o = Walkover
- r = Retired
- d = Defaulted
- SR = Special ranking

First round
1	(United States) E King (Germany) J Lenz	6^{4}	6	[10]
(Morocco) E Benchetrit (United Kingdom) J Clarke	7^{7}	4	[7]
(Australia) A Bolt (Australia) A Santillan	1	1
WC	(Italy) M Bortolotti (Colombia) C Rodríguez	6	6
4	(Peru) S Galdós (Bolivia) F Zeballos	6	1	[9]
(Croatia) B Gojo (China) Zh Zhang	4	6	[11]
WC	(Italy) F Cobolli (Italy) F Passaro	6	6
WC	(Croatia) V Galović (Croatia) N Serdarušić	4	3
(Dominican Republic) R Cid Subervi (United States) T-S Kwiatkowski	2	6	[5]
(United States) B Fratangelo (United States) M Krueger	6	4	[10]
(France) G Blancaneaux (France) E Couacaud	7^{7}	3	[5]
3	(Brazil) F Meligeni Alves (Brazil) J Menezes	6^{4}	6	[10]
(Argentina) A Collarini (Argentina) TM Etcheverry	2	6^{5}
Alt	(United States) J Cerretani (Romania) VV Cornea	6	7^{7}
(Argentina) F Mena (Kazakhstan) D Popko	3	6	[4]
2	(Poland) K Drzewiecki (Spain) S Martos Gornés	6	4	[10]

Quarterfinals
1	(United States) E King (Germany) J Lenz	6	3	[10]
WC	(Italy) M Bortolotti (Colombia) C Rodríguez	4	6	[8]
(Croatia) B Gojo (China) Zh Zhang	6^{5}	6	[1]
WC	(Italy) F Cobolli (Italy) F Passaro	7^{7}	4	[10]
(United States) B Fratangelo (United States) M Krueger	w/o
3	(Brazil) F Meligeni Alves (Brazil) J Menezes
Alt	(United States) J Cerretani (Romania) VV Cornea	6	3	[4]
2	(Poland) K Drzewiecki (Spain) S Martos Gornés	3	6	[10]

Semifinals
1	(United States) E King (Germany) J Lenz	7	7^{8}
WC	(Italy) F Cobolli (Italy) F Passaro	5	6^{6}
(United States) B Fratangelo (United States) M Krueger	2	4
2	(Poland) K Drzewiecki (Spain) S Martos Gornés	6	6

Final
1	(United States) E King (Germany) J Lenz	3	6	[11]
2	(Poland) K Drzewiecki (Spain) S Martos Gornés	6	3	[9]
