= 2018 Thindown Challenger Biella – Singles =

Singles
- 2018 Thindown Challenger Biella

Final
- Champion: (Argentina) Federico Delbonis
- Runner-up: (Italy) Stefano Napolitano
- Score: 6–4, 6–3

Events
Singles	Doubles
← 2017 ·	Thindown Challenger Biella	· 2019 →

Filip Krajinović was the defending champion but chose not to defend his title.

Federico Delbonis won the title after defeating Stefano Napolitano 6–4, 6–3 in the final.

== Seeds ==
1. (Spain) Roberto Carballés Baena (quarterfinals)
2. (Argentina) Federico Delbonis (champion)
3. (Italy) Paolo Lorenzi (quarterfinals)
4. (Brazil) Thiago Monteiro (semifinals)
5. (Argentina) Marco Trungelliti (quarterfinals)
6. (Italy) Stefano Travaglia (semifinals)
7. (Portugal) Gastão Elias (first round)
8. (Spain) Daniel Gimeno Traver (first round)

== Draw ==
=== Key ===
- Q = Qualifier
- WC = Wild card
- LL = Lucky loser
- Alt = Alternate
- SE = Special exempt
- PR = Protected ranking
- ITF = ITF entry
- JE = Junior exempt
- w/o = Walkover
- r = Retired
- d = Defaulted
- SR = Special ranking

=== Finals ===
Semifinals
(Italy) Stefano Napolitano	6	5	6
6	(Italy) Stefano Travaglia	3	7	2
4/Alt	(Brazil) Thiago Monteiro	2	3
2	(Argentina) Federico Delbonis	6	6

Final
(Italy) Stefano Napolitano	4	3
2	(Argentina) Federico Delbonis	6	6

=== Top half ===
First round
1	(Spain) R Carballés Baena	6	6
(Italy) L Giustino	3	4
Q	(Chile) MT Barrios Vera	6	5	7
(Spain) B Zapata Miralles	2	7	5
(Croatia) V Galović	2	6	4
WC	(Italy) E Dalla Valle	6	4	6
(Italy) S Napolitano	7^{7}	6
8	(Spain) D Gimeno Traver	6^{3}	3
3/WC	(Italy) P Lorenzi	6	6
Q	(France) M Bourgue	2	4
WC	(Italy) Pietro Rondoni	6	2	0
(Spain) R Ojeda Lara	3	6	6
(Italy) M Donati	6	6
LL	(Brazil) Oscar José Gutierrez	3	3
LL	(Peru) JP Varillas	1	4
6	(Italy) S Travaglia	6	6

Second round
1	(Spain) R Carballés Baena	6	6
Q	(Chile) MT Barrios Vera	4	2
WC	(Italy) E Dalla Valle	2	2
(Italy) S Napolitano	6	6
3/WC	(Italy) P Lorenzi	6	6
(Spain) R Ojeda Lara	2	1
(Italy) M Donati	1	3^{r}
6	(Italy) S Travaglia	6	1

Quarterfinals
1	(Spain) R Carballés Baena	3	6	1
(Italy) S Napolitano	6	3	6
3/WC	(Italy) P Lorenzi	2	5
6	(Italy) S Travaglia	6	7

Semifinals
(Italy) S Napolitano	6	5	6
6	(Italy) S Travaglia	3	7	2

=== Bottom half ===
First round
5	(Argentina) M Trungelliti	4	6	6
SE	(Spain) A Davidovich Fokina	6	3	4
(Lithuania) L Grigelis	4	6^{3}
(Spain) T Robredo	6	7^{7}
(Spain) O Roca Batalla	7^{7}	2	3
(Italy) A Arnaboldi	6^{3}	6	6
WC	(Italy) A Pellegrino	7^{7}	1	2
4/Alt	(Brazil) T Monteiro	6^{4}	6	6
7	(Portugal) G Elias	5	0
SE	(Argentina) F Argüello	7	6
(Argentina) P Cachin	3	7^{8}	4
(Italy) F Baldi	6	6^{6}	6
Q	(France) A Müller	2	2
(Italy) S Caruso	6	6
Q	(Czech Republic) J Šátral	6	3	1
2	(Argentina) F Delbonis	3	6	6

Second round
5	(Argentina) M Trungelliti	7	7
(Spain) T Robredo	5	5
(Italy) A Arnaboldi	3	1
4/Alt	(Brazil) T Monteiro	6	6
SE	(Argentina) F Argüello	6	6
(Italy) F Baldi	4	2
(Italy) S Caruso	3	5
2	(Argentina) F Delbonis	6	7

Quarterfinals
5	(Argentina) M Trungelliti	1	2
4/Alt	(Brazil) T Monteiro	6	6
SE	(Argentina) F Argüello	2	4
2	(Argentina) F Delbonis	6	6

Semifinals
4/Alt	(Brazil) T Monteiro	2	3
2	(Argentina) F Delbonis	6	6
