= 2021 Biella Challenger VI =

- Date: 17–23 May 2021
- Edition: 15th
- Surface: Clay
- Location: Biella, Italy

Champions

Singles
- (Australia) Thanasi Kokkinakis

Doubles
- (United States) Evan King / (Germany) Julian Lenz
← 2021 ·	Biella Challenger	· 2021 →

The 2021 Biella Challenger VI was a professional tennis tournament played on outdoor red clay courts. It was part of the 2021 ATP Challenger Tour. It took in Biella, Italy between 17 and 23 May 2021.

== Singles main-draw entrants ==
=== Seeds ===
Country	Player	Rank^{1}	Seed
ITA	Paolo Lorenzi	167	1
CHN	Zhang Zhizhen	183	2
FRA	Enzo Couacaud	188	3
FRA	Alexandre Müller	189	4
KAZ	Dmitry Popko	193	5
AUS	Alex Bolt	194	6
BRA	João Menezes	196	7
USA	Bjorn Fratangelo	198	8

- Rankings are as of 10 May 2021.

=== Other entrants ===
The following players received wildcards into the singles main draw:

- (Italy) Flavio Cobolli
- (Italy) Paolo Lorenzi
- (Italy) Stefano Napolitano

The following players received entry from the qualifying draw:

- (Italy) Riccardo Bonadio
- (Argentina) Tomás Martín Etcheverry
- (Italy) Omar Giacalone
- (Netherlands) Tim van Rijthoven

== Champions ==
=== Singles ===
- (Australia) Thanasi Kokkinakis def. (France) Enzo Couacaud 6–3, 6–4.

=== Doubles ===
- (United States) Evan King / (Germany) Julian Lenz def. (Poland) Karol Drzewiecki / (Spain) Sergio Martos Gornés 3–6, 6–3, [11–9].
