= 2020 Thindown Challenger Biella =

- Date: 28 September – 4 October 2020
- Edition: 13th
- Surface: Clay
- Location: Biella, Italy

Champions

Singles
- (Argentina) Facundo Bagnis

Doubles
- (Finland) Harri Heliövaara / (Poland) Szymon Walków
← 2019 ·	Thindown Challenger Biella	· 2021 →

The 2020 Thindown Challenger Biella was a professional tennis tournament played on outdoor red clay courts. It was part of the 2020 ATP Challenger Tour. It took place in Biella, Italy between 28 September and 4 October 2020.

== Singles main-draw entrants ==
=== Seeds ===
Country	Player	Rank^{1}	Seed
BRA	Thiago Seyboth Wild	107	1
AUS	Christopher O'Connell	112	2
IND	Sumit Nagal	127	3
ARG	Facundo Bagnis	129	4
ITA	Paolo Lorenzi	130	5
ITA	Federico Gaio	132	6
IND	Prajnesh Gunneswaran	141	7
PER	Juan Pablo Varillas	142	8

- Rankings are as of 21 September 2020.

=== Other entrants ===
The following players received wildcards into the singles main draw:

- (Switzerland) Rémy Bertola
- (Italy) Gabriele Felline
- (Italy) Stefano Napolitano

The following player received entry into the singles main draw using a protected ranking:

- (Slovenia) Blaž Kavčič

The following players received entry from the qualifying draw:

- (Italy) Andrea Arnaboldi
- (France) Alexandre Müller
- (Italy) Andrea Pellegrino
- (Chinese Taipei) Tseng Chun-hsin

== Champions ==
=== Singles ===
- (Argentina) Facundo Bagnis def. (Slovenia) Blaž Kavčič 6–7^{(4–7)}, 6–4, 0–0 ret.

=== Doubles ===
- (Finland) Harri Heliövaara / (Poland) Szymon Walków def. (United Kingdom) Lloyd Glasspool / (United States) Alex Lawson 7–5, 6–3.
