= 2020 Thindown Challenger Biella – Doubles =

Doubles
- 2020 Thindown Challenger Biella

Final
- Champions: (Finland) Harri Heliövaara (Poland) Szymon Walków
- Runners-up: (United Kingdom) Lloyd Glasspool (United States) Alex Lawson
- Score: 7–5, 6–3

Events
Singles	Doubles
← 2019 ·	Thindown Challenger Biella	· 2021 →

Tomislav Brkić and Ante Pavić were the defending champions but chose not to defend their title.

Harri Heliövaara and Szymon Walków won the title after defeating Lloyd Glasspool and Alex Lawson 7–5, 6–3 in the final.

== Seeds ==
1. (Kazakhstan) Andrey Golubev / (Italy) Andrea Vavassori (quarterfinals)
2. (Monaco) Romain Arneodo / (Spain) David Vega Hernández (quarterfinals)
3. (India) Sriram Balaji / (Switzerland) Luca Margaroli (semifinals)
4. (Spain) Sergio Martos Gornés / (India) Ramkumar Ramanathan (quarterfinals)

== Draw ==
=== Key ===
- Q = Qualifier
- WC = Wild card
- LL = Lucky loser
- Alt = Alternate
- SE = Special exempt
- PR = Protected ranking
- ITF = ITF entry
- JE = Junior exempt
- w/o = Walkover
- r = Retired
- d = Defaulted
- SR = Special ranking

First round
1	(Kazakhstan) A Golubev (Italy) A Vavassori	6	3	[10]
(Colombia) N Barrientos (Slovenia) B Rola	3	6	[5]
(Italy) F Gaio (Italy) P Lorenzi	3	4
WC	(United States) B Fratangelo (Australia) A Harris	6	6
4	(Spain) S Martos Gornés (India) R Ramanathan	6	6
(Italy) GM Moroni (Italy) A Pellegrino	2	1
(Finland) H Heliövaara (Poland) S Walków	6	6
WC	(Italy) Pietro Buscaglione (Italy) Cesare Carpano	0	0
(Dominican Republic) R Cid Subervi (Argentina) A Collarini	4	1
(Peru) A Merino (Peru) JP Varillas	6	6
(Argentina) F Bagnis (Peru) S Galdós	6	5	[6]
3	(India) S Balaji (Switzerland) L Margaroli	3	7	[10]
(United Kingdom) L Glasspool (United States) A Lawson	6	6
(Russia) T Gabashvili (Uzbekistan) D Istomin	1	4
WC	(Italy) A Arnaboldi (Italy) F Baldi	4	5
2	(Monaco) R Arneodo (Spain) D Vega Hernández	6	7

Quarterfinals
1	(Kazakhstan) A Golubev (Italy) A Vavassori	6	6^{3}	[6]
WC	(United States) B Fratangelo (Australia) A Harris	1	7^{7}	[10]
4	(Spain) S Martos Gornés (India) R Ramanathan	6^{3}	4
(Finland) H Heliövaara (Poland) S Walków	7^{7}	6
(Peru) A Merino (Peru) JP Varillas	4	3
3	(India) S Balaji (Switzerland) L Margaroli	6	6
(United Kingdom) L Glasspool (United States) A Lawson	7^{7}	4	[10]
2	(Monaco) R Arneodo (Spain) D Vega Hernández	6^{3}	6	[3]

Semifinals
WC	(United States) B Fratangelo (Australia) A Harris	3	5
(Finland) H Heliövaara (Poland) S Walków	6	7
3	(India) S Balaji (Switzerland) L Margaroli	5	5
(United Kingdom) L Glasspool (United States) A Lawson	7	7

Final
(Finland) H Heliövaara (Poland) S Walków	7	6
(United Kingdom) L Glasspool (United States) A Lawson	5	3
