= 2018 Thindown Challenger Biella – Doubles =

Doubles
- 2018 Thindown Challenger Biella

Final
- Champions: (Brazil) Fabrício Neis (Spain) David Vega Hernández
- Runners-up: (Australia) Rameez Junaid (India) Purav Raja
- Score: 6–4, 6–4

Events
Singles	Doubles
← 2017 ·	Thindown Challenger Biella	· 2019 →

Attila Balázs and Fabiano de Paula were the defending champions and chose not to defend their title.

Fabrício Neis and David Vega Hernández won the title after defeating Rameez Junaid and Purav Raja 6–4, 6–4 in the final.

== Seeds ==
1. (Uruguay) Ariel Behar / (Brazil) Fernando Romboli (semifinals)
2. (Philippines) Ruben Gonzales / (United States) Nathaniel Lammons (quarterfinals)
3. (Brazil) Fabrício Neis / (Spain) David Vega Hernández (champions)
4. (Australia) Rameez Junaid / (India) Purav Raja (final)

== Draw ==
=== Key ===
- Q = Qualifier
- WC = Wild card
- LL = Lucky loser
- Alt = Alternate
- SE = Special exempt
- PR = Protected ranking
- ITF = ITF entry
- JE = Junior exempt
- w/o = Walkover
- r = Retired
- d = Defaulted
- SR = Special ranking

First round
1	(Uruguay) A Behar (Brazil) F Romboli	6	3	[10]
(Croatia) I Sabanov (Croatia) M Sabanov	3	6	[8]
WC	(Italy) G Fonio (Italy) J Sinner	6^{6}	2
(Italy) A Pellegrino (Italy) A Vavassori	7^{8}	6
3	(Brazil) F Neis (Spain) D Vega Hernández	6	3	[10]
(Italy) M Donati (Italy) S Napolitano	3	6	[7]
WC	(Italy) E Dalla Valle (Italy) S Travaglia	6	3	[5]
(Argentina) F Argüello (Argentina) G Durán	4	6	[10]
(Serbia) N Čačić (Lithuania) L Grigelis	4	6^{2}
(Italy) A Motti (Italy) J Ocleppo	6	7^{7}
Alt	(Brazil) Oscar José Gutierrez (Peru) JP Varillas	6^{4}	1
4	(Australia) R Junaid (India) P Raja	7^{7}	6
(Argentina) P Cachin (Argentina) M Trungelliti	6	6
WC	(Italy) Edoardo Ceretti (Italy) Sebastiano Mahora Zorzi	0	1
(Italy) F Baldi (Italy) S Caruso	6^{2}	6	[8]
2	(Philippines) R Gonzales (United States) N Lammons	7^{7}	2	[10]

Quarterfinals
1	(Uruguay) A Behar (Brazil) F Romboli	6	6
(Italy) A Pellegrino (Italy) A Vavassori	4	4
3	(Brazil) F Neis (Spain) D Vega Hernández	3	6	[10]
(Argentina) F Argüello (Argentina) G Durán	6	2	[6]
(Italy) A Motti (Italy) J Ocleppo	6	2	[6]
4	(Australia) R Junaid (India) P Raja	2	6	[10]
(Argentina) P Cachin (Argentina) M Trungelliti	7^{7}	3	[10]
2	(Philippines) R Gonzales (United States) N Lammons	6^{3}	6	[7]

Semifinals
1	(Uruguay) A Behar (Brazil) F Romboli	4	1
3	(Brazil) F Neis (Spain) D Vega Hernández	6	6
4	(Australia) R Junaid (India) P Raja	7	6
(Argentina) P Cachin (Argentina) M Trungelliti	5	4

Final
3	(Brazil) F Neis (Spain) D Vega Hernández	6	6
4	(Australia) R Junaid (India) P Raja	4	4
