= 2014 Challenger Pulcra Lachiter Biella – Doubles =

Doubles
- 2014 Challenger Pulcra Lachiter Biella

Final
- Champion: (Italy) Marco Cecchinato (Italy) Matteo Viola
- Runner-up: (Germany) Frank Moser (Germany) Alexander Satschko
- Score: 7–5, 6–0

Events
Singles	Doubles
← 2013 ·	Challenger Pulcra Lachiter Biella	· 2015 →

James Cerretani and Adil Shamasdin were the defending champions, but chose not to compete this year.

Marco Cecchinato and Matteo Viola won the title, defeating Frank Moser and Alexander Satschko 7–5, 6–0 in the final.

== Seeds ==
1. (Germany) Frank Moser / (Germany) Alexander Satschko (final)
2. (Philippines) Ruben Gonzales / (United Kingdom) Sean Thornley (quarterfinals)
3. (Italy) Andrea Arnaboldi / (Italy) Alessandro Giannessi (first round)
4. (Italy) Walter Trusendi / (Italy) Matteo Volante (quarterfinals)

== Draw ==
=== Key ===
- Q = Qualifier
- WC = Wild card
- LL = Lucky loser
- Alt = Alternate
- SE = Special exempt
- PR = Protected ranking
- ITF = ITF entry
- JE = Junior exempt
- w/o = Walkover
- r = Retired
- d = Defaulted
- SR = Special ranking

First round
1	(Germany) F Moser (Germany) A Satschko	3	6	[10]
WC	(Italy) M Bortolotti (Italy) Alessandro Colella	6	3	[5]
WC	(Italy) Enrico Becuzzi (Italy) Augusto Virgili	w/o
(Monaco) B Balleret (France) B Paire
4	(Italy) W Trusendi (Italy) Matteo Volante	6	6^{7}	[3]
(France) Julien Obry (France) M Teixeira	1	7^{9}	[10]
(Czech Republic) M Michalička (Belgium) Y Reuter	3	6^{4}
(Italy) Lorenzo Frigerio (Italy) M Trevisan	6	7^{7}
(Italy) M Donati (Italy) S Napolitano	7	6
(Serbia) N Čačić (Serbia) N Ćirić	5	4
WC	(Czech Republic) J Hájek (Czech Republic) Jan Mašík	4	6^{5}
3	(Italy) A Arnaboldi (Italy) A Giannessi	6	7^{7}
(Italy) M Cecchinato (Italy) M Viola	6	6
(Italy) Pietro Licciardi (Italy) Pietro Rondoni	1	2
(Italy) Erik Crepaldi (Italy) G Naso	2	2
2	(Philippines) R Gonzales (United Kingdom) S Thornley	6	6

Quarterfinals
1	(Germany) F Moser (Germany) A Satschko	6	6
WC	(Italy) E Becuzzi (Italy) A Virgili	2	4
(France) J Obry (France) M Teixeira	0	1
(Italy) L Frigerio (Italy) M Trevisan	6	6
(Italy) M Donati (Italy) S Napolitano	7	2	[10]
3	(Italy) A Arnaboldi (Italy) A Giannessi	5	6	[5]
(Italy) M Cecchinato (Italy) M Viola	5	6	[10]
2	(Philippines) R Gonzales (United Kingdom) S Thornley	7	3	[6]

Semifinals
1	(Germany) F Moser (Germany) A Satschko	6	6
(Italy) L Frigerio (Italy) M Trevisan	1	1
(Italy) M Donati (Italy) S Napolitano	3	6	[7]
(Italy) M Cecchinato (Italy) M Viola	6	4	[10]

Final
1	(Germany) F Moser (Germany) A Satschko	5	0
(Italy) M Cecchinato (Italy) M Viola	7	6
