= 2019 Thindown Challenger Biella – Doubles =

Doubles
- 2019 Thindown Challenger Biella

Final
- Champions: (Bosnia and Herzegovina) Tomislav Brkić (Croatia) Ante Pavić
- Runners-up: (Uruguay) Ariel Behar (Kazakhstan) Andrey Golubev
- Score: 7–6^{(7–2)}, 6–4

Events
Singles	Doubles
← 2018 ·	Thindown Challenger Biella	· 2020 →

Fabrício Neis and David Vega Hernández were the defending champions but only Vega Hernández chose to defend his title, partnering Fernando Romboli. Vega Hernández lost in the quarterfinals to Eduard Esteve Lobato and Oriol Roca Batalla.

Tomislav Brkić and Ante Pavić won the title after defeating Ariel Behar and Andrey Golubev 7–6^{(7–2)}, 6–4 in the final.

== Seeds ==
1. (Brazil) Fernando Romboli / (Spain) David Vega Hernández (quarterfinals)
2. (Bosnia and Herzegovina) Tomislav Brkić / (Croatia) Ante Pavić (champions)
3. (Switzerland) Luca Margaroli / (Canada) Adil Shamasdin (quarterfinals)
4. (Germany) Andre Begemann / (Romania) Florin Mergea (first round)

== Draw ==
=== Key ===
- Q = Qualifier
- WC = Wild card
- LL = Lucky loser
- Alt = Alternate
- SE = Special exempt
- PR = Protected ranking
- ITF = ITF entry
- JE = Junior exempt
- w/o = Walkover
- r = Retired
- d = Defaulted
- SR = Special ranking

First round
1	(Brazil) F Romboli (Spain) D Vega Hernández	6	6
(Italy) F Gaio (Italy) A Pellegrino	3	4
(Spain) Eduard Esteve Lobato (Spain) O Roca Batalla	6^{3}	6	[10]
WC	(Italy) A Arnaboldi (Italy) F Arnaboldi	7^{7}	1	[3]
4	(Germany) A Begemann (Romania) F Mergea	4	2
(Uruguay) A Behar (Kazakhstan) A Golubev	6	6
PR	(Spain) D Gimeno Traver (Spain) D Muñoz de la Nava	3	2
(Argentina) C Berlocq (Argentina) P Cachin	6	6
(Italy) R Brancaccio (Italy) E Dalla Valle	3	6	[7]
3	(Switzerland) L Margaroli (Canada) A Shamasdin	6	3	[10]
(France) M Chazal (Croatia) V Galović	2	7^{7}	[5]
(Italy) GM Moroni (Spain) M Vilella Martínez	6	6^{3}	[10]
(Switzerland) S Ehrat (Sweden) M Eriksson	2	4
2	(Bosnia and Herzegovina) T Brkić (Croatia) A Pavić	6	6

Quarterfinals
1	(Brazil) F Romboli (Spain) D Vega Hernández	3	6^{4}
(Spain) E Esteve Lobato (Spain) O Roca Batalla	6	7^{7}
(Uruguay) A Behar (Kazakhstan) A Golubev	6	6
WC	(Italy) M Arnaldi (Italy) Gabriele Felline	1	1
(Argentina) C Berlocq (Argentina) P Cachin	4	7^{7}	[10]
3	(Switzerland) L Margaroli (Canada) A Shamasdin	6	6^{2}	[8]
(Italy) GM Moroni (Spain) M Vilella Martínez	3	1
2	(Bosnia and Herzegovina) T Brkić (Croatia) A Pavić	6	6

Semifinals
(Spain) E Esteve Lobato (Spain) O Roca Batalla	3	3
(Uruguay) A Behar (Kazakhstan) A Golubev	6	6
(Argentina) C Berlocq (Argentina) P Cachin	2	1
2	(Bosnia and Herzegovina) T Brkić (Croatia) A Pavić	6	6

Final
(Uruguay) A Behar (Kazakhstan) A Golubev	6^{2}	4
2	(Bosnia and Herzegovina) T Brkić (Croatia) A Pavić	7^{7}	6
