= 2014 Challenger Pulcra Lachiter Biella =

- Date: 8–14 September 2014
- Edition: 7th
- Location: Biella, Italy

Champions

Singles
- (Italy) Matteo Viola

Doubles
- (Italy) Marco Cecchinato / (Italy) Matteo Viola
← 2010 ·	Challenger Pulcra Lachiter Biella	· 2015 →

The 2014 Challenger Pulcra Lachiter Biella was a professional tennis tournament played on outdoor red clay courts. It was part of the 2014 ATP Challenger Tour. It took place in Biella, Italy between 8–14 September 2014. It returned for the first time since 2010.

== Entrants ==
=== Seeds ===
Country	Player	Rank^{1}	Seed
FRA	Benoît Paire	98	1
ITA	Filippo Volandri	148	2
ITA	Marco Cecchinato	160	3
ITA	Andrea Arnaboldi	172	4
ITA	Matteo Viola	193	5
AUS	Jason Kubler	197	6
SUI	Henri Laaksonen	280	7
AUT	Dennis Novak	281	8

- Rankings are as of September 1, 2014.

=== Other entrants ===
The following players received wildcards into the singles main draw:

- (Italy) Marco Bortolotti
- (Italy) Erik Crepaldi
- (Italy) Pietro Licciardi
- (Italy) Stefano Napolitano

The following player entered as an alternate:

- (Switzerland) Henri Laaksonen

The following player entered using a protected ranking:

- (Switzerland) Sandro Ehrat

The following players received entry from the qualifying draw:

- (France) Maxime Chazal
- (Serbia) Nikola Ćirić
- (Croatia) Viktor Galović
- (Italy) Lorenzo Sonego

== Champions ==
=== Singles ===
- (Italy) Matteo Viola def. (Italy) Filippo Volandri, 7–5, 6–1

=== Doubles ===
- (Italy) Marco Cecchinato / (Italy) Matteo Viola def. (Germany) Frank Moser / (Germany) Alexander Satschko, 7–5, 6–0
