= 2021 Biella Challenger V =

- Date: 3–9 May 2021
- Edition: 14th
- Surface: Clay
- Location: Biella, Italy

Champions

Singles
- (Peru) Juan Pablo Varillas

Doubles
- (Sweden) André Göransson / (United States) Nathaniel Lammons
← 2020 ·	Biella Challenger	· 2021 →

The 2021 Biella Challenger V was a professional tennis tournament played on outdoor red clay courts. It was part of the 2021 ATP Challenger Tour. It took place in Biella, Italy between 3 and 9 May 2021.

== Singles main-draw entrants ==
=== Seeds ===
Country	Player	Rank^{1}	Seed
POR	Pedro Sousa	113	1
BOL	Hugo Dellien	125	2
USA	Mackenzie McDonald	127	3
GER	Cedrik-Marcel Stebe	134	4
ITA	Federico Gaio	138	5
FRA	Hugo Gaston	147	6
PER	Juan Pablo Varillas	150	7
JPN	Go Soeda	154	8

- Rankings are as of 26 April 2021.

=== Other entrants ===
The following players received wildcards into the singles main draw:

- (Serbia) Hamad Međedović
- (Italy) Stefano Napolitano
- (Italy) Luca Vanni

The following player received entry into the singles main draw using a protected ranking:

- ~~(Australia) Thanasi Kokkinakis~~

The following players received entry into the singles main draw as alternates:

- (United Kingdom) Jay Clarke
- (Argentina) Andrea Collarini
- ~~(Australia) Aleksandar Vukic~~

The following players received entry from the qualifying draw:

- (Argentina) Guido Andreozzi
- (Croatia) Viktor Galović
- (Germany) Maximilian Marterer
- (Brazil) Felipe Meligeni Alves

The following players received entry as lucky losers:

- (Chile) Marcelo Tomás Barrios Vera
- (Bulgaria) Dimitar Kuzmanov

== Champions ==
=== Singles ===
- (Peru) Juan Pablo Varillas def. (Argentina) Guido Andreozzi 6–3, 6–1.

=== Doubles ===
- (Sweden) André Göransson / (United States) Nathaniel Lammons def. (Brazil) Rafael Matos / (Brazil) Felipe Meligeni Alves 7–6^{(7–3)}, 6–3.
