= 2017 Thindown Challenger Biella =

- Date: 31 July – 6 August 2017
- Edition: 10th
- Location: Biella, Italy

Champions

Singles
- (Serbia) Filip Krajinović

Doubles
- (Hungary) Attila Balázs / (Brazil) Fabiano de Paula
← 2016 ·	Thindown Challenger Biella	· 2018 →

The 2017 Thindown Challenger Biella was a professional tennis tournament played on outdoor red clay courts. It was part of the 2017 ATP Challenger Tour. It took place in Biella, Italy between 31 July – 6 August 2017.

== Singles main-draw entrants ==
=== Seeds ===
Country	Player	Rank^{1}	Seed
ITA	Marco Cecchinato	104	1
ESP	Guillermo García López	131	2
~~ARG~~	~~Leonardo Mayer~~	~~138~~	~~3~~
ARG	Guido Andreozzi	139	4
SRB	Filip Krajinović	141	5
BRA	João Souza	145	6
ITA	Stefano Travaglia	146	7
ESP	Roberto Carballés Baena	158	8

- Rankings are as of July 24, 2017.

=== Other entrants ===
The following players received wildcards into the singles main draw:

- (Italy) Matteo Donati
- (Italy) Andrea Pellegrino
- (Italy) Pietro Rondoni
- (Italy) Lorenzo Sonego

The following player received entry into the singles main draw as a special exempt:

- (Italy) Matteo Viola

The following player received entry into the singles main draw as an alternate:

- (Croatia) Viktor Galović

The following players received entry from the qualifying draw:

- (Italy) Andrea Arnaboldi
- (Russia) Ivan Gakhov
- (Italy) Gianluca Mager
- (Italy) Roberto Marcora

The following players received entry as lucky losers:

- (Bosnia and Herzegovina) Tomislav Brkić
- (Sweden) Mikael Ymer

== Champions ==
=== Singles ===
- (Serbia) Filip Krajinović def. (Italy) Salvatore Caruso 6–3, 6–2.

=== Doubles ===
- (Hungary) Attila Balázs / (Brazil) Fabiano de Paula def. (Sweden) Johan Brunström / (Croatia) Dino Marcan 5–7, 6–4, [10–4].
