= 2021 Biella Challenger VI – Singles =

Singles
- 2021 Biella Challenger VI

Final
- Champion: (Australia) Thanasi Kokkinakis
- Runner-up: (France) Enzo Couacaud
- Score: 6–3, 6–4

Events
| Singles | Doubles |
- Biella Challenger

Juan Pablo Varillas was the defending champion but chose not to defend his title.

Thanasi Kokkinakis won the title after defeating Enzo Couacaud 6–3, 6–4 in the final.

== Seeds ==
1. (Italy) Paolo Lorenzi (first round)
2. (China) Zhang Zhizhen (semifinals)
3. (France) Enzo Couacaud (final)
4. (France) Alexandre Müller (quarterfinals)
5. (Kazakhstan) Dmitry Popko (first round)
6. (Australia) Alex Bolt (first round)
7. (Brazil) João Menezes (first round)
8. (United States) Bjorn Fratangelo (quarterfinals)

== Draw ==
Key

- Q = Qualifier
- WC = Wild card
- LL = Lucky loser
- Alt = Alternate
- ITF = ITF entry
- PR = Protected ranking
- SR = Special ranking
- SE = Special exempt
- JE = Junior exempt
- JR = Junior Accelerator Programme entrant
- CO = College Accelerator Programme entrant
- NG = Next Gen Accelerator Program entrant
- w/o = Walkover
- r = Retired
- d = Defaulted

=== Finals ===
Semifinals
Q | (Argentina) Tomás Martín Etcheverry | 1 | 7 | 4
3 | (France) Enzo Couacaud | 6 | 5 | 6
(Australia) Thanasi Kokkinakis | 6 | 4 | 6
2 | (China) Zhang Zhizhen | 2 | 6 | 3

Final
3 | (France) Enzo Couacaud | 3 | 4
(Australia) Thanasi Kokkinakis | 6 | 6

=== Top half ===
First round
1/WC | (Italy) P Lorenzi | 0 | 6^{5}
Q | (Argentina) TM Etcheverry | 6 | 7^{7}
(Brazil) F Meligeni Alves | 6 | 6
(United Kingdom) J Clarke | 3 | 3
(France) T Lamasine | 5 | 6 | 1
(Bulgaria) D Kuzmanov | 7 | 4 | 6
(Argentina) F Mena | 6 | 6
7 | (Brazil) J Menezes | 3 | 4
3 | (France) E Couacaud | 6 | 6
(Germany) T Kamke | 4 | 2
Q | (Netherlands) T van Rijthoven | 6 | 6
Q | (Italy) Omar Giacalone | 2 | 2
(Argentina) A Collarini | 6 | 6
(Romania) M Copil | 2 | 1
(Turkey) C İlkel | 2 | 4
8 | (United States) B Fratangelo | 6 | 6

Second round
Q | (Argentina) TM Etcheverry | 4 | 7^{7} | 4
(Brazil) F Meligeni Alves | 6 | 6^{0} | 0^{r}
(Bulgaria) D Kuzmanov | 2 | 7^{8} | 1
(Argentina) F Mena | 6 | 6^{6} | 6
3 | (France) E Couacaud | 7^{7} | 5 | 6
Q | (Netherlands) T van Rijthoven | 6^{4} | 7 | 2
(Argentina) A Collarini | 6 | 6^{2} | 0^{r}
8 | (United States) B Fratangelo | 1 | 7^{7} | 3

Quarterfinals
Q | (Argentina) TM Etcheverry | 6 | 6
(Argentina) F Mena | 3 | 2
3 | (France) E Couacaud | 6 | 6^{5} | 6
8 | (United States) B Fratangelo | 1 | 7^{7} | 3

Semifinals
Q | (Argentina) TM Etcheverry | 1 | 7 | 4
3 | (France) E Couacaud | 6 | 5 | 6

=== Bottom half ===
First round
6 | (Australia) A Bolt | 7^{9} | 1 | 3
WC | (Italy) S Napolitano | 6^{7} | 6 | 6
(Uzbekistan) D Istomin | 6 | 2 | 3
(Australia) T Kokkinakis | 3 | 6 | 6
(Dominican Republic) R Cid Subervi | 5 | 3
Q | (Italy) R Bonadio | 7 | 6
(Italy) M Viola | 6 | 3 | 1
4 | (France) A Müller | 4 | 6 | 6
5 | (Kazakhstan) D Popko | 2 | 6 | 6^{2}
(United States) T-S Kwiatkowski | 6 | 1 | 7^{7}
(Morocco) E Benchetrit | 4 | 4
(United States) U Blanch | 6 | 6
(United States) M Krueger | 4 | 3
WC | (Italy) F Cobolli | 6 | 6
(Croatia) B Gojo | 3 | 6 | 2
2 | (China) Zh Zhang | 6 | 4 | 6

Second round
WC | (Italy) S Napolitano | 3 | 4
(Australia) T Kokkinakis | 6 | 6
Q | (Italy) R Bonadio | 0 | 6^{4}
4 | (France) A Müller | 6 | 7^{7}
(United States) T-S Kwiatkowski | 6 | 7^{7}
(United States) U Blanch | 4 | 6^{3}
WC | (Italy) F Cobolli | 6 | 4 | 2
2 | (China) Zh Zhang | 4 | 6 | 6

Quarterfinals
(Australia) T Kokkinakis | 6 | 7^{7}
4 | (France) A Müller | 4 | 6^{1}
(United States) T-S Kwiatkowski | 4 | 6^{5}
2 | (China) Zh Zhang | 6 | 7^{7}

Semifinals
(Australia) T Kokkinakis | 6 | 4 | 6
2 | (China) Zh Zhang | 2 | 6 | 3
