= Julian Lenz =

German tennis player

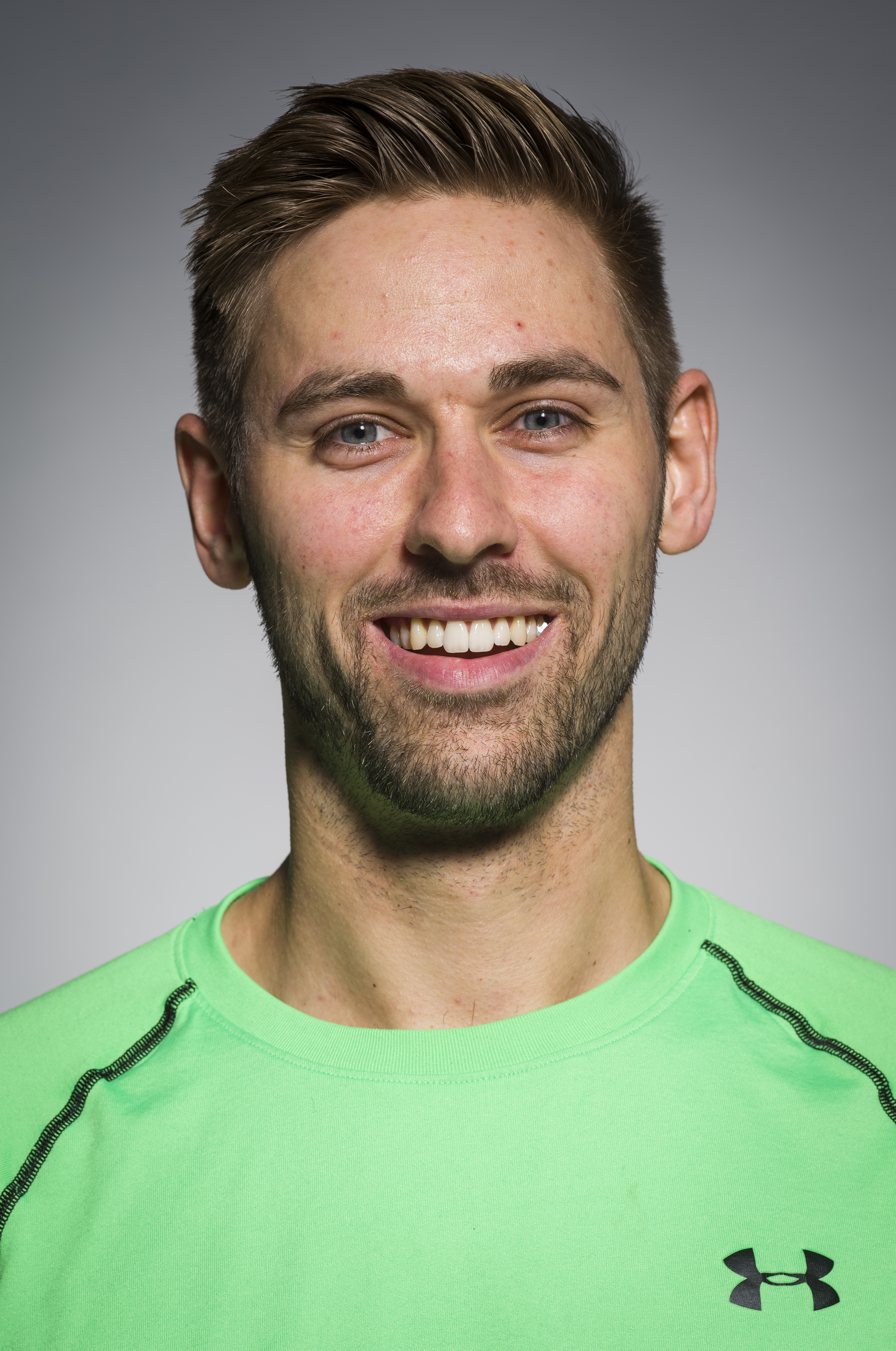
- Lenz in 2018
- Country (sports): Germany
- Residence: Grünberg, Hesse Germany
- Born: 17 February 1993 (age 33) Giessen, Germany
- Height: 1.88 m (6 ft 2 in)
- Plays: Right-handed (two handed-backhand)
- Prize money: $219,927

Singles
- Career record: 0–2 (at ATP Tour level)
- Career titles: 0
- Highest ranking: No. 227 (6 January 2020)

Grand Slam singles results
- Australian Open: Q2 (2021)
- French Open: Q1 (2020)

Doubles
- Career record: 1–1 (at ATP Tour level)
- Career titles: 0
- Highest ranking: No. 162 (21 June 2021)

Julian Lenz (born 17 February 1993 in Giessen) is a German tennis player. He has an ATP career high singles ranking of world No. 227 achieved in January 2020. In doubles, he reached his career-high ranking of No. 162 in June 2021.

== Career ==
Lenz won the 2011 US Open boys' doubles title, partnering Robin Kern.

He played college tennis for the Baylor University.

He made his ATP Tour main draw debut by qualifying for both singles and doubles at the 2019 Hamburg European Open. In singles, he lost to world No. 10 Fabio Fognini in the first round. In doubles, he and partner Daniel Masur upset compatriots Alexander and Mischa Zverev after saving two match points in the opening round.

== Junior Grand Slam finals ==
=== Doubles: 1 (1 title) ===
| Result | Year | Championship | Surface | Partner | Opponents | Score |
|---|---|---|---|---|---|---|
| Win | 2011 | US Open | Hard | (Germany) Robin Kern | (Moldova) Maxim Dubarenco (Ukraine) Vladyslav Manafov | 7–5, 6–4 |

== ATP Challenger and ITF Futures/World Tennis Tour finals ==
=== Singles: 8 (3–5) ===
| Legend ATP Challengers (0–0) ITF Futures/World Tennis Tour (3–5) | Finals by surface Hard (0–1) Clay (3–4) Grass (0–0) Carpet (0–0) |

| Result | W–L | Date | Tournament | Tier | Surface | Opponent | Score |
|---|---|---|---|---|---|---|---|
| Loss | 0–1 | Aug 2013 | Germany F12, Wetzlar | Futures | Clay | (Germany) Bastian Knittel | 2–6, 6–3, 3–6 |
| Loss | 0–2 | Aug 2014 | Germany F10, Wetzlar | Futures | Clay | (Kazakhstan) Evgeny Korolev | 0–6, 6–0, 3–6 |
| Loss | 0–3 | Jan 2015 | USA F1, Plantation | Futures | Clay | (Sweden) Christian Lindell | 5–7, 0–6 |
| Loss | 0–4 | Jul 2016 | Germany F8, Kassel | Futures | Clay | (Germany) Yannick Hanfmann | 6–7^{(5–7)}, 1–6 |
| Win | 1–4 | May 2017 | Czech Republic F1, Prague | Futures | Clay | (Slovakia) Juraj Masár | 6–2, 6–3 |
| Win | 2–4 | May 2017 | Czech Republic F2, Most | Futures | Clay | (Czech Republic) Jan Mertl | 4–6, 6–2, 6–2 |
| Loss | 2–5 | Jan 2019 | M25 Hong Kong, China | World Tour | Hard | (France) Evan Furness | 6–5, ret. |
| Win | 3–5 | Jun 2019 | M25 Karlsruhe, Germany | World Tour | Clay | (Italy) Andrea Pellegrino | 6–3, 6–7^{(3–7)}, 6–3 |

=== Doubles: 15 (6–9) ===
| Legend ATP Challengers (2–4) ITF Futures/World Tennis Tour (4–5) | Finals by surface Hard (2–5) Clay (4–4) Grass (0–0) Carpet (0–0) |

| Result | W–L | Date | Tournament | Tier | Surface | Partner | Opponents | Score |
|---|---|---|---|---|---|---|---|---|
| Loss | 0–1 | Aug 2013 | Germany F12, Wetzlar | Futures | Clay | (Germany) Lars Pörschke | (Netherlands) Wesley Koolhof (Netherlands) Rogier Wassen | 6–3, 0–6, [7–10] |
| Loss | 0–2 | Aug 2014 | Germany F10, Wetzlar | Futures | Clay | (Germany) Lars Pörschke | (Netherlands) David Pel (Netherlands) Dennis van Scheppingen | 6–7^{(2–7)}, 6–7^{(5–7)} |
| Loss | 0–3 | Nov 2015 | USA F34, Waco | Futures | Hard (i) | (United States) William Little | (United States) Sekou Bangoura (United States) Matt Seeberger | 6–1, 3–6, [6–10] |
| Win | 1–3 | Jul 2016 | Germany F6, Saarlouis | Futures | Clay | (Germany) Sebastian Fanselow | (Uruguay) Marcel Felder (Argentina) Manuel Peña López | 7–6^{(7–4)}, 6–3 |
| Loss | 1–4 | Dec 2016 | USA F39, Waco | Futures | Hard (i) | (Colombia) Juan Manuel Benítez | (United Kingdom) Farris Fathi Gosea (Mexico) Hans Hach Verdugo | 5–7, 3–6 |
| Win | 2–4 | Nov 2017 | USA F36, Niceville | Futures | Clay | (Colombia) Juan Manuel Benítez | (Bolivia) Boris Arias (United States) Nick Chappell | 7–5, 4–6, [10–7] |
| Win | 3–4 | Dec 2017 | USA F39, Waco | Futures | Hard (i) | (Venezuela) Roberto Maytín | (United States) Nathaniel Lammons (United States) Alex Lawson | 7–6^{(7–5)}, 1–6, [14–12] |
| Win | 4–4 | Mar 2019 | M25 Trento, Italy | World Tour | Hard (i) | (Austria) Alexander Erler | (United States) Felix Corwin (United States) Danny Thomas | 6–3, 6–4 |
| Loss | 4–5 | Mar 2019 | M25+H Kazan, Russia | World Tour | Hard (i) | (Germany) Jeremy Jahn | (Russia) Konstantin Kravchuk (Russia) Alexander Pavlioutchenkov | Walkover |
| Loss | 4–6 | Feb 2020 | Koblenz, Germany | Challenger | Hard | (Germany) Yannick Maden | (Netherlands) Sander Arends (Netherlands) David Pel | 6–7^{(4–7)}, 6–7^{(3–7)} |
| Win | 5–6 | May 2021 | Biella, Italy | Challenger | Clay | (United States) Evan King | (Poland) Karol Drzewiecki (Spain) Sergio Martos Gornés | 3–6, 6–3, [11–9] |
| Loss | 5–7 | May 2021 | Oeiras, Portugal | Challenger | Clay | (Ecuador) Roberto Quiroz | (Netherlands) Jesper de Jong (Netherlands) Tim Van Rijthoven | 1–6, 6–7^{(3–7)} |
| Win | 6–7 | Oct 2021 | Lima, Peru | Challenger | Clay | (Austria) Gerald Melzer | (Colombia) Nicolás Barrientos (Brazil) Fernando Romboli | 7–6^{(7–4)}, 7–6^{(7–3)} |
| Loss | 6–8 | Sep 2022 | Como, Italy | Challenger | Clay | (Jamaica) Dustin Brown | (Austria) Alexander Erler (Austria) Lucas Miedler | 1–6, 6–7^{(3–7)} |
| Loss | 6–9 | Oct 2022 | Hamburg, Germany | Challenger | Hard (i) | (Jamaica) Dustin Brown | (Philippines) Treat Huey (United States) Max Schnur | 6–7^{(6–8)}, 4–6 |
