= 2015 Challenger Pulcra Lachiter Biella – Singles =

Singles
- 2015 Challenger Pulcra Lachiter Biella

Final
- Champion: (Slovakia) Andrej Martin
- Runner-up: (Argentina) Nicolás Kicker
- Score: 6–4, 6–2

Events
Singles	Doubles
- Challenger Pulcra Lachiter Biella

Matteo Viola was the defending champion but he did not participate this year.

Andrej Martin won the tournament, defeating Nicolás Kicker in the final, 6–4, 6–2.

== Seeds ==
1. (Georgia (country)) Nikoloz Basilashvili (first round)
2. (Brazil) André Ghem (first round)
3. (Netherlands) Thiemo de Bakker (second round)
4. (Chile) Hans Podlipnik-Castillo (quarterfinals)
5. (Argentina) Nicolás Kicker (final)
6. (Slovakia) Andrej Martin (champions)
7. (Dominican Republic) José Hernández (second round)
8. (Slovakia) Jozef Kovalík (first round)

== Draw ==
Key

- Q = Qualifier
- WC = Wild card
- LL = Lucky loser
- Alt = Alternate
- ITF = ITF entry
- PR = Protected ranking
- SR = Special ranking
- SE = Special exempt
- JE = Junior exempt
- JR = Junior Accelerator Programme entrant
- CO = College Accelerator Programme entrant
- NG = Next Gen Accelerator Program entrant
- w/o = Walkover
- r = Retired
- d = Defaulted

=== Finals ===
Semifinals
(Italy) Gianluca Naso	6^{2}	6^{7}
5	(Argentina) Nicolás Kicker	7^{7}	7^{9}
WC	(Italy) Salvatore Caruso	3	1
6	(Slovakia) Andrej Martin	6	6

Final
5	(Argentina) Nicolás Kicker	4	2
6	(Slovakia) Andrej Martin	6	6

=== Top half ===
First round
1/SE	(Georgia (country)) N Basilashvili	6	4	6^{4}
PR	(Portugal) P Sousa	3	6	7^{7}
(Italy) G Naso	6	1
(Spain) O Roca Batalla	4	0^{r}
(Morocco) L Ouahab	6	6
(Spain) R Ramírez Hidalgo	4	4
(Italy) R Marcora	3	3
7	(Dominican Republic) J Hernández	6	6
4	(Chile) H Podlipnik-Castillo	7	7
Q	(Chile) Bastián Malla	5	6^{2}
(Belgium) G Gigounon	5	2
LL	(Argentina) A Velotti	7	6
(Poland) G Panfil	0^{r}
(Spain) J Samper-Montaña	3
Q	(Brazil) J Menezes	3	7	3
5	(Argentina) N Kicker	6	5	6

Second round
PR	(Portugal) P Sousa	6^{2}	3
(Italy) G Naso	7^{7}	6
(Morocco) L Ouahab	2	6	6
7	(Dominican Republic) J Hernández	6	3	2
4	(Chile) H Podlipnik-Castillo	6	6
LL	(Argentina) A Velotti	0	3
(Spain) J Samper-Montaña	6	4	4
5	(Argentina) N Kicker	2	6	6

Quarterfinals
(Italy) G Naso	6	6
(Morocco) L Ouahab	2	0
4	(Chile) H Podlipnik-Castillo	3	6	2
5	(Argentina) N Kicker	6	2	6

Semifinals
(Italy) G Naso	6^{2}	6^{7}
5	(Argentina) N Kicker	7^{7}	7^{9}

=== Bottom half ===
First round
8	(Slovakia) J Kovalík	4	4
WC	(Italy) S Caruso	6	6
Q	(Italy) M Bortolotti	6	6^{7}	0
(Italy) R Bellotti	4	7^{9}	6
WC	(Italy) G Quinzi	6	1	4
(Bosnia and Herzegovina) T Brkić	2	6	6
Q	(Brazil) F Neis	1	0
3/SE	(Netherlands) T de Bakker	6	6
6	(Slovakia) A Martin	4	6	7^{8}
(Serbia) P Krstin	6	4	6^{6}
WC	(Italy) S Napolitano	4	2
(Austria) D Novak	6	6
(Hungary) M Fucsovics	6^{1}	4
WC	(Italy) A Giannessi	7^{7}	6
(Italy) T Fabbiano	4	6	6
2	(Brazil) A Ghem	6	3	2

Second round
WC	(Italy) S Caruso	7^{7}	6
(Italy) R Bellotti	6^{5}	3
(Bosnia and Herzegovina) T Brkić	3	6	7^{7}
3/SE	(Netherlands) T de Bakker	6	2	6^{4}
6	(Slovakia) A Martin	5	6	6
(Austria) D Novak	7	4	2
WC	(Italy) A Giannessi	4	4
(Italy) T Fabbiano	6	6

Quarterfinals
WC	(Italy) S Caruso	6	6
(Bosnia and Herzegovina) T Brkić	2	2
6	(Slovakia) A Martin	4	6	7^{7}
(Italy) T Fabbiano	6	3	6^{4}

Semifinals
WC	(Italy) S Caruso	3	1
6	(Slovakia) A Martin	6	6
