= 2015 Challenger Pulcra Lachiter Biella =

- Date: 27 July – 2 August 2015
- Edition: 8th
- Location: Biella, Italy

Champions

Singles
- (Slovakia) Andrej Martin

Doubles
- (Slovakia) Andrej Martin / (Chile) Hans Podlipnik Castillo
- Challenger Pulcra Lachiter Biella

The 2015 Challenger Pulcra Lachiter Biella was a professional tennis tournament played on outdoor red clay courts. It was part of the 2015 ATP Challenger Tour. It took place in Biella, Italy between 27 July – 2 August 2015.

== Entrants ==
=== Seeds ===
Country	Player	Rank^{1}	Seed
GEO	Nikoloz Basilashvili	118	1
BRA	André Ghem	128	2
NED	Thiemo de Bakker	137	3
CHI	Hans Podlipnik Castillo	164	4
ARG	Nicolás Kicker	174	5
SVK	Andrej Martin	178	6
DOM	José Hernández	182	7
SVK	Jozef Kovalík	186	8

- Rankings are as of July 20, 2015.

=== Other entrants ===
The following players received wildcards into the singles main draw:

- (Italy) Salvatore Caruso
- (Italy) Alessandro Giannessi
- (Italy) Stefano Napolitano
- (Italy) Gianluigi Quinzi

The following players received entry as special exemptions:

- (Netherlands) Thiemo de Bakker
- (Georgia (country)) Nikoloz Basilashvili

The following player entered with a protected ranking:

- (Portugal) Pedro Sousa

The following players received entry from the qualifying draw:

- (Italy) Marco Bortolotti
- (Chile) Bastián Malla
- (Brazil) João Menezes
- (Brazil) Fabrício Neis

The following player entered as a lucky loser:

- (Argentina) Agustín Velotti

== Champions ==
=== Singles ===
- (Slovakia) Andrej Martin def. (Argentina) Nicolás Kicker 6–4, 6–2

=== Doubles ===
- (Slovakia) Andrej Martin / (Chile) Hans Podlipnik Castillo def. (Romania) Alexandru-Daniel Carpen / (Croatia) Dino Marcan 7–5, 1–6, [10–8]
