= 2019 Thindown Challenger Biella =

- Date: 16–22 September 2019
- Edition: 12th
- Surface: Clay
- Location: Biella, Italy

Champions

Singles
- (Italy) Gianluca Mager

Doubles
- (Bosnia and Herzegovina) Tomislav Brkić / (Croatia) Ante Pavić
- Thindown Challenger Biella

The 2019 Thindown Challenger Biella was a professional tennis tournament played on outdoor red clay courts. It was part of the 2019 ATP Challenger Tour. It took place in Biella, Italy between 16 and 22 September 2019.

== Singles main-draw entrants ==
=== Seeds ===
Country	Player	Rank^{1}	Seed
ESP	Alejandro Davidovich Fokina	109	1
ESP	Jaume Munar	112	2
SVK	Andrej Martin	114	3
ITA	Paolo Lorenzi	121	4
JPN	Taro Daniel	137	5
ITA	Lorenzo Giustino	138	6
ITA	Alessandro Giannessi	140	7
ITA	Gianluca Mager	142	8
ITA	Filippo Baldi	148	9
ITA	Federico Gaio	154	10
ESP	Mario Vilella Martínez	190	11
ARG	Marco Trungelliti	196	12
ESP	Tommy Robredo	201	13
ITA	Stefano Napolitano	203	14
FRA	Elliot Benchetrit	211	15
ARG	Carlos Berlocq	228	16

- Rankings are as of 9 September 2019.

=== Other entrants ===
The following players received wildcards into the singles main draw:

- (Italy) Federico Arnaboldi
- (Italy) Matteo Arnaldi
- (Italy) Giacomo Dambrosi
- (Italy) Gabriele Felline
- (Italy) Pietro Rondoni

The following player received entry into the singles main draw using a protected ranking:

- (Spain) Daniel Muñoz de la Nava

The following players received entry from the qualifying draw:

- (Brazil) Oscar José Gutierrez
- (Brazil) Fernando Romboli

== Champions ==
=== Singles ===
- (Italy) Gianluca Mager def. (Italy) Paolo Lorenzi 6–0, 6–7^{(4–7)}, 7–5.

=== Doubles ===
- (Bosnia and Herzegovina) Tomislav Brkić / (Croatia) Ante Pavić def. (Uruguay) Ariel Behar / (Kazakhstan) Andrey Golubev 7–6^{(7–2)}, 6–4.
