= Andrej Martin =

Slovak tennis player

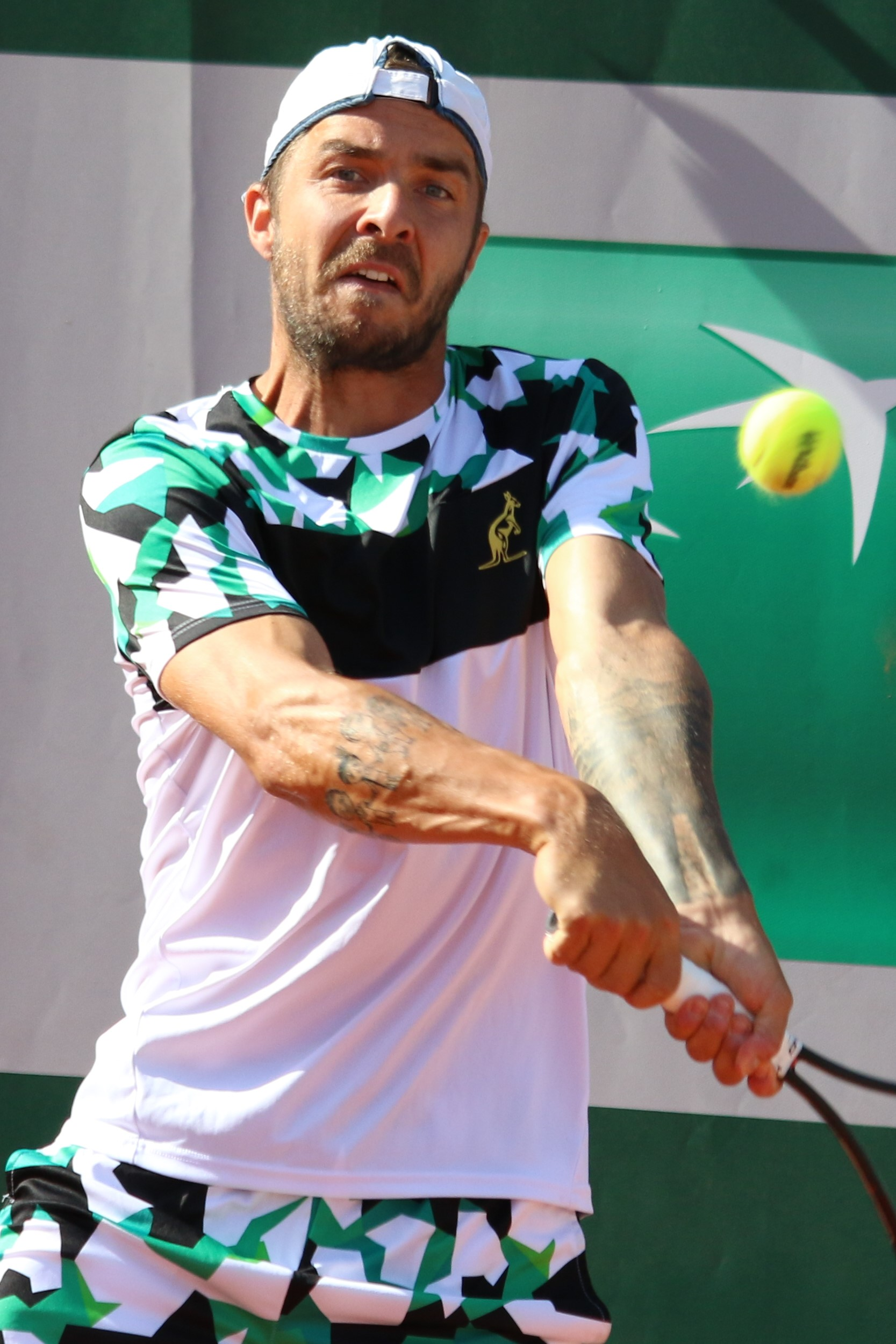
- Martin at the 2022 French Open
- Country (sports): Slovakia
- Born: 20 September 1989 (age 37) Bratislava, Czechoslovakia
- Height: 1.83 m (6 ft 0 in)
- Turned pro: 2007
- Plays: Right-handed (two-handed backhand)
- Prize money: US $1,676,721

Singles
- Career record: 27–38
- Career titles: 0
- Highest ranking: No. 93 (10 February 2020)
- Current ranking: No. 379 (14 September 2026)

Grand Slam singles results
- Australian Open: 1R (2021)
- French Open: 3R (2016)
- Wimbledon: Q2 (2010, 2021, 2022)
- US Open: 1R (2013, 2020)

Other tournaments
- Olympic Games: 3R (2016)

Doubles
- Career record: 11–14
- Career titles: 0
- Highest ranking: No. 69 (11 July 2016)
- Current ranking: No. 867 (14 September 2026)

Grand Slam doubles results
- Australian Open: 1R (2021)
- Wimbledon: 2R (2016)

Team competitions
- Davis Cup: 8–11
Medal record
Men's tennis
Representing Slovakia
European Youth Olympic Festival
| Bronze medal – third place | 2005 Lignano Sabbiadoro | Mixed doubles |
- Last updated on: 18 September 2026.

Andrej Martin (Slovak pronunciation: [ˈandrej ˈmartin]; born 20 September 1989, in Bratislava) is a Slovak professional tennis player. He achieved his career-high ATP singles ranking of world No. 93 on 10 February 2020 and a doubles ranking of world No. 69 on 11 July 2016.

== Career ==
=== 2016: Best season: French Open third round, Maiden ATP singles final, top 100 ===
He was a lucky loser at the French Open and defeated Daniel Muñoz de la Nava in the first round of the main draw and 29th seed Lucas Pouille in the second, before losing to 8th-seed Milos Raonic in the third round.

In July 2016, Martin reached first ATP final, in Umag, defeated Martin Kližan, João Sousa, Carlos Berlocq and Sergiy Stakhovsky en route. In the final he lost to Italian No. 1 Fabio Fognini.

Later in the year, Martin participated in the 2016 Summer Olympics. After comfortably defeating Denis Kudla in the first round, Martin got a walkover into the 3rd round when opponent Philipp Kohlschreiber withdrew with an injury. However, Martin was then beaten by the 4th-seeded Kei Nishikori, 2–6, 2–6.

He achieved a career-high ATP singles ranking of world No. 98 in July 2016 following his runs to the third round of the French Open and the final in Umag.

=== 2020: Career-high singles ranking ===
He reached a career-high ranking of No. 93 on 10 February 2020 after a semifinal showing at the 2020 Córdoba Open defeating Corentin Moutet in the quarterfinals before losing to eventual champion Cristian Garín.

He entered directly into the main draw of the US Open but lost in the first round to 21st seed Alex de Minaur.

=== 2021: Australian Open debut, ATP semifinal & loss to World No. 1 ===
He made his main draw debut at the 2021 Australian Open where he lost to Thiago Monteiro.

At the 2021 Belgrade Open after qualifying for the main draw, he defeated Christopher O'Connell, third seed Nikoloz Basilashvili, fifth seed Dušan Lajović but lost to top seed and World No. 1 and eventual champion Novak Djokovic in the semifinals.

=== 2022–24: Maiden doubles final, suspension, comeback ===
Martin reached his maiden doubles final at the 2022 Córdoba Open partnering Sam Weissborn.

In 2023, he was banned from professional tennis for 14 months till 5 June 2024 by the International Tennis Integrity Agency after testing positive for Ostarine. Martin explained that he had mistakenly drunk from a floorball teammate's water bottle; the teammate admitted to adding the prohibited drug to his own bottle.

== Grand Slam performance timelines ==
Key
| W | F | SF | QF | #R | RR | Q# | P# | DNQ | A | Z# | PO | G | S | B | NMS | NTI | P | NH |

(W) winner; (F) finalist; (SF) semifinalist; (QF) quarterfinalist; (#R) rounds 4, 3, 2, 1; (RR) round-robin stage; (Q#) qualification round; (P#) preliminary round; (DNQ) did not qualify; (A) absent; (Z#) Davis/Fed Cup Zonal Group (with number indication) or (PO) play-off; (G) gold, (S) silver or (B) bronze Olympic/Paralympic medal; (NMS) not a Masters tournament; (NTI) not a Tier I tournament; (P) postponed; (NH) not held; (SR) strike rate (events won / competed); (W–L) win–loss record.
To avoid confusion and double counting, these charts are updated at the conclusion of a tournament or when the player's participation has ended.

=== Singles ===
Key
| W | F | SF | QF | #R | RR | Q# | P# | DNQ | A | Z# | PO | G | S | B | NMS | NTI | P | NH |

(W) winner; (F) finalist; (SF) semifinalist; (QF) quarterfinalist; (#R) rounds 4, 3, 2, 1; (RR) round-robin stage; (Q#) qualification round; (P#) preliminary round; (DNQ) did not qualify; (A) absent; (Z#) Davis/Fed Cup Zonal Group (with number indication) or (PO) play-off; (G) gold, (S) silver or (B) bronze Olympic/Paralympic medal; (NMS) not a Masters tournament; (NTI) not a Tier I tournament; (P) postponed; (NH) not held; (SR) strike rate (events won / competed); (W–L) win–loss record.
To avoid confusion and double counting, these charts are updated at the conclusion of a tournament or when the player's participation has ended.

| Tournament | 2010 | 2011 | 2012 | 2013 | 2014 | 2015 | 2016 | 2017 | 2018 | 2019 | 2020 | 2021 | 2022 | SR | W–L | Win % |
|---|---|---|---|---|---|---|---|---|---|---|---|---|---|---|---|---|
| Australian Open | A | Q3 | A | Q1 | Q3 | Q1 | A | Q1 | A | Q1 | Q2 | 1R | Q1 | 0 / 1 | 0–1 | 0% |
| French Open | A | Q1 | A | Q1 | Q2 | Q1 | 3R | Q1 | Q2 | Q1 | 2R | 1R | Q1 | 0 / 3 | 3–3 | 50% |
| Wimbledon | Q2 | Q1 | A | A | Q1 | Q1 | Q1 | Q1 | Q1 | Q1 | NH | Q2 | Q2 | 0 / 0 | 0–0 | – |
| US Open | A | A | A | 1R | Q2 | A | A | A | A | A | 1R | A | A | 0 / 2 | 0–2 | 0% |
| Win–loss | 0–0 | 0–0 | 0–0 | 0–1 | 0–0 | 0–0 | 2–1 | 0–0 | 0–0 | 0–0 | 1–2 | 0–2 | 0–0 | 0 / 6 | 3–6 | 33% |

== ATP career finals ==
=== Singles: 1 (1 runner-up) ===
| Legend Grand Slam ATP Masters 1000 ATP 500 Series ATP 250 Series (0–1) | Finals by surface Hard (0–0) Clay (0–1) Grass (0–0) Carpet (0–0) | Finals by setting Outdoor (0–1) Indoor (0–0) |

| Result | Date | Tournament | Tier | Surface | Opponent | Score |
|---|---|---|---|---|---|---|
| Loss | Jul 2016 | Croatia Open, Croatia | 250 Series | Clay | (Italy) Fabio Fognini | 4–6, 1–6 |

=== Doubles: 1 (1 runner-up) ===
| Legend Grand Slam ATP Masters 1000 ATP 500 Series ATP 250 Series (0–1) | Titles by surface Hard (0–0) Clay (0–1) Grass (0–0) Carpet (0–0) |

| Result | W–L | Date | Tournament | Tier | Surface | Partner | Opponents | Score |
|---|---|---|---|---|---|---|---|---|
| Loss | 0–1 | Feb 2022 | Córdoba Open, Argentina | 250 Series | Clay | (Austria) Tristan-Samuel Weissborn | (Mexico) Santiago González (Argentina) Andrés Molteni | 5–7, 3–6 |

== ATP Challenger and ITF Tour finals ==
=== Singles: 40 (26 titles, 14 runner-ups) ===
| Legend (singles) ATP Challenger Tour (12–10) ITF Futures Tour (14–4) | Titles by surface Hard (5–1) Clay (21–13) |

| Result | W–L | Date | Tournament | Tier | Surface | Opponent | Score |
|---|---|---|---|---|---|---|---|
| Loss | 0–1 | Jun 2008 | Czech Rep. F4, Karlovy Vary | Futures | Clay | (Czech Republic) Michal Tabara | 4–6, 2–6 |
| Loss | 0–2 | Aug 2008 | Slovak Rep. F2, Piešťany | Futures | Clay | (Czech Republic) Dušan Lojda | 1–6, 3–6 |
| Win | 1–2 | May 2009 | Slovenia F1, Domžale | Futures | Clay | (Czech Republic) Dušan Lojda | 6–3, 5–7, 7–6^{(7–5)} |
| Loss | 1–3 | Jul 2009 | Austria F4, Vandans | Futures | Clay | (Austria) Johannes Ager | 2–6, 0–6 |
| Win | 2–3 | Jul 2009 | Austria F6, Kramsach | Futures | Clay | (Slovenia) Janez Semrajc | 4–6, 6–3, 6–4 |
| Win | 3–3 | Jan 2010 | Israel F1, Eilat | Futures | Hard | (United States) Todd Paul | 6–2, 6–2 |
| Win | 4–3 | Feb 2010 | Israel F2, Eilat | Futures | Hard | (China) Zhang Ze | 6–1, 6–1 |
| Win | 5–3 | Mar 2010 | Great Britain F4, Bath | Futures | Hard (i) | (Netherlands) Igor Sijsling | 2–6, 6–2, 7–6^{(7–4)} |
| Win | 6–3 | Aug 2010 | Samarkand, Uzbekistan | Challenger | Clay | (Slovakia) Marek Semjan | 6–4, 7–5 |
| Win | 7–3 | Mar 2012 | Portugal F2, Faro | Futures | Hard | (United Kingdom) Daniel Smethurst | 6–2, 6–2 |
| Loss | 7–4 | Mar 2012 | Croatia F3, Umag | Futures | Clay | (Italy) Marco Cecchinato | 3–6, 4–6 |
| Win | 8–4 | May 2012 | Czech Republic F3, Jablonec nad Nisou | Futures | Clay | (Czech Republic) Jaroslav Pospíšil | 6–4, 6–2 |
| Win | 9–4 | Aug 2012 | Slovakia F1, Piešťany | Futures | Clay | (Slovakia) Miloslav Mečíř | 1–6, 7–6^{(7–5)}, 6–1 |
| Win | 10–4 | Oct 2012 | Croatia F10, Solin | Futures | Clay | (Czech Republic) Jaroslav Pospíšil | 6–2, 6–2 |
| Win | 11–4 | Oct 2012 | Croatia F11, Dubrovnik | Futures | Clay | (Czech Republic) Dušan Lojda | 7–5, 3–6, 6–1 |
| Loss | 11–5 | Jan 2013 | Nouméa, New Caledonia | Challenger | Hard | (France) Adrian Mannarino | 4–6, 3–6 |
| Win | 12–5 | Apr 2013 | Mexico City, Mexico | Challenger | Hard | (France) Adrian Mannarino | 4–6, 6–4, 6–1 |
| Loss | 12–6 | Jun 2013 | Milan, Italy | Challenger | Clay | (Italy) Filippo Volandri | 3–6, 2–6 |
| Win | 13–6 | Jul 2013 | San Benedetto, Italy | Challenger | Clay | (Portugal) João Sousa | 6–4, 6–3 |
| Win | 14–6 | Aug 2014 | Liberec, Czech Republic | Challenger | Clay | (Argentina) Horacio Zeballos | 1–6, 6–1, 6–4 |
| Win | 15–6 | Jul 2015 | Padova, Italy | Challenger | Clay | (Spain) Albert Montañés | 0–6, 6–4, 7–6^{(8–6)} |
| Win | 16–6 | Aug 2015 | Biella, Italy | Challenger | Clay | (Argentina) Nicolás Kicker | 6–4, 6–2 |
| Loss | 16–7 | Aug 2015 | Liberec, Czech Republic | Challenger | Clay | (Germany) Tobias Kamke | 6–7^{(6–8)}, 4–6 |
| Loss | 16–8 | Nov 2015 | Lima, Peru | Challenger | Clay | (Portugal) Gastão Elias | 2–6, 6–7^{(4–7)} |
| Win | 17–8 | Apr 2017 | San Luis Potosí, Mexico | Challenger | Clay | (Spain) Adrián Menéndez Maceiras | 7–5, 6–4 |
| Win | 18–8 | Jul 2017 | Prague, Czech Republic | Challenger | Clay | (Germany) Yannick Maden | 7–6^{(7–3)}, 6–3 |
| Win | 19–8 | Aug 2018 | Liberec, Czech Republic | Challenger | Clay | (Portugal) Pedro Sousa | 6–1, 6–2 |
| Win | 20–8 | Apr 2019 | Nanchang, China, P.R. | Challenger | Clay (i) | (Australia) Jordan Thompson | 6–4, 1–6, 6–3 |
| Win | 21–8 | May 2019 | Shymkent, Kazakhstan | Challenger | Clay | (Kazakhstan) Dmitry Popko | 5–7, 6–4, 6–4 |
| Win | 22–8 | Jun 2019 | Shymkent, Kazakhstan | Challenger | Clay | (Italy) Stefano Travaglia | 6–4, 6–4 |
| Loss | 22–9 | Aug 2019 | L'Aquila, Italy | Challenger | Clay | (Argentina) Andrea Collarini | 3–6, 1–6 |
| Loss | 22–10 | Sep 2019 | Como, Italy | Challenger | Clay | (Argentina) Facundo Mena | 6–2, 4–6, 1–6 |
| Loss | 22–11 | Nov 2020 | Guayaquil, Ecuador | Challenger | Clay | (Argentina) Francisco Cerúndolo | 4–6, 6–3, 2–6 |
| Loss | 22–12 | May 2022 | Heilbronn, Germany | Challenger | Clay | (Germany) Daniel Altmaier | 6–3, 1–6, 4–6 |
| Win | 23–12 | Jun 2024 | M15 Bergamo, Italy | World Tennis Tour | Clay | (Italy) Gianluca Cadenasso | 6–3, 6–3 |
| Win | 24–12 | Jul 2024 | M15 Slovenska Bistrica, Slovenia | World Tennis Tour | Clay | (United States) Felix Corwin | 5–7, 6–4, 6–2 |
| Win | 25–12 | Sep 2024 | M15 Vienna, Austria | WTT | Clay | (Slovakia) Milos Karol | 6–2, 6–1 |
| Loss | 25–13 | Feb 2025 | Kigali, Rwanda | Challenger | Clay | (France) Valentin Royer | 1–6, 2–6 |
| Loss | 25–14 | Nov 2025 | Maia Open, Portugal | Challenger | Clay (i) | (Denmark) Elmer Møller | 4–6, 1–6 |
| Win | 26–14 | Aug 2026 | M15 Vienna, Austria | WTT | Clay | (Italy) Manuel Plunger | 6–0, 6–1 |

=== Doubles: 39 (23 titles, 16 runner-ups) ===
| Legend (doubles) ATP Challenger Tour (15–11) ITF Futures Tour (8–5) | Titles by surface Hard (6–1) Clay (15–14) Grass (0–0) Carpet (2–1) |

| Result | W–L | Date | Tournament | Tier | Surface | Partner | Opponents | Score |
|---|---|---|---|---|---|---|---|---|
| Loss | 0–1 | Aug 2007 | Slovak Rep. F1, Žilina | Futures | Clay | (Slovakia) Adrian Sikora | (Czech Republic) Jakub Čech (Czech Republic) Filip Zeman | 7–6^{(7–3)}, 6–7^{(4–7)}, 3–6 |
| Loss | 0–2 | Nov 2007 | Iran F4, Kish Island | Futures | Clay | (Slovakia) Marek Semjan | (Hungary) Attila Balázs (Hungary) György Balázs | 3–6, 6–7^{(6–8)} |
| Loss | 0–3 | Jun 2008 | Czech Rep. F4, Karlovy Vary | Futures | Clay | (Slovakia) Miloslav Mečíř | (Hungary) Kornél Bardóczky (Czech Republic) Martin Vacek | w/o |
| Win | 1–3 | Jan 2009 | Austria F1, Bergheim | Futures | Carpet (i) | (Slovenia) Aljaž Bedene | (Austria) Gerald Melzer (Austria) Nicolas Reissig | 6–3, 6–2 |
| Win | 2–3 | Oct 2009 | Egypt F14, Cairo | Futures | Clay | (Czech Republic) Jaroslav Pospíšil | (Germany) Alexander Flock (Germany) Gero Kretschmer | 3–6, 6–2, [10–6] |
| Win | 3–3 | Nov 2009 | Czech Rep. F5, Opava | Futures | Carpet (i) | (Czech Republic) Roman Jebavý | (Czech Republic) Jaroslav Pospíšil (Czech Republic) Pavel Šnobel | 7–6^{(7–2)}, 6–4 |
| Win | 4–3 | Jan 2010 | Israel F1, Eilat | Futures | Hard | (Slovakia) Miloslav Mečíř | (China) Wu Di (China) Zhang Ze | 6–2, 6–3 |
| Loss | 4–4 | Feb 2010 | Israel F2, Eilat | Futures | Hard | (Slovakia) Miloslav Mečíř | (United States) Cory Parr (United States) Todd Paul | 6–3, 3–6, [5–10] |
| Win | 5–4 | Mar 2010 | Great Britain F3, Tipton | Futures | Hard (i) | (Slovakia) Kamil Čapkovič | (France) Olivier Charroin (France) Ludovic Walter | 6–0, 6–2 |
| Win | 6–4 | Mar 2010 | Great Britain F4, Bath | Futures | Hard (i) | (Slovakia) Kamil Čapkovič | (United Kingdom) Tim Bradshaw (Australia) John Millman | 7–6^{(7–1)}, 6–3 |
| Win | 7–4 | Mar 2012 | Portugal F2, Faro | Futures | Hard | (Slovakia) Adrian Sikora | (Bolivia) Hugo Dellien (Bolivia) Federico Zeballos | 6–1, 6–2 |
| Win | 8–4 | Mar 2012 | Croatia F3, Umag | Futures | Clay | (Czech Republic) Roman Jebavý | (Croatia) Marin Draganja (Croatia) Dino Marcan | 6–3, 7–5 |
| Loss | 8–5 | Oct 2012 | Croatia F10, Solin | Futures | Clay | (Czech Republic) Jaroslav Pospíšil | (Croatia) Mate Delić (Croatia) Tomislav Draganja | 3–6, 6–4, [9–11] |
| Win | 9–5 | Feb 2013 | Bergamo, Italy | Challenger | Hard (i) | (Slovakia) Karol Beck | (Italy) Claudio Grassi (Israel) Amir Weintraub | 6–3, 3–6, [10–8] |
| Win | 10–5 | Feb 2014 | Morelos, Mexico | Challenger | Hard | (Austria) Gerald Melzer | (Mexico) Alejandro Moreno Figueroa (Mexico) Miguel Ángel Reyes-Varela | 6–2, 6–4 |
| Win | 11–5 | Jun 2014 | Vicenza, Italy | Challenger | Clay | (Slovakia) Igor Zelenay | (Poland) Mateusz Kowalczyk (Poland) Błażej Koniusz | 6–1, 7–5 |
| Win | 12–5 | May 2015 | Ostrava, Czech Republic | Challenger | Clay | (Chile) Hans Podlipnik Castillo | (Czech Republic) Roman Jebavý (Czech Republic) Jan Šátral | 4–6, 7–5, [10–1] |
| Win | 13–5 | Jul 2015 | Biella, Italy | Challenger | Clay | (Chile) Hans Podlipnik Castillo | (Romania) Alexandru-Daniel Carpen (Croatia) Dino Marcan | 7–5, 1–6, [10–8] |
| Win | 14–5 | Aug 2015 | Liberec, Czech Republic | Challenger | Clay | (Chile) Hans Podlipnik Castillo | (Netherlands) Wesley Koolhof (Netherlands) Matwé Middelkoop | 7–5, 6–7^{(3–7)}, [10–5] |
| Win | 15–5 | Aug 2015 | Cordenons, Italy | Challenger | Clay | (Slovakia) Igor Zelenay | (Croatia) Dino Marcan (Croatia) Antonio Šančić | 6–4, 5–7, [10–8] |
| Loss | 15–6 | Sep 2015 | St Remy, France | Challenger | Clay | (Slovakia) Igor Zelenay | (United Kingdom) Ken Skupski (United Kingdom) Neal Skupski | 4–6, 1–6 |
| Loss | 15–7 | Oct 2015 | Santiago, Chile | Challenger | Clay | (Chile) Hans Podlipnik Castillo | (Argentina) Guillermo Durán (Argentina) Máximo González | 6–7^{(2–7)}, 5–7 |
| Win | 16–7 | Oct 2015 | Lima, Peru | Challenger | Clay | (Chile) Hans Podlipnik Castillo | (Brazil) Rogério Dutra Silva (Brazil) João Souza | 6–3, 6–4 |
| Win | 17–7 | Nov 2015 | Montevideo, Uruguay | Challenger | Clay | (Chile) Hans Podlipnik Castillo | (Brazil) Marcelo Demoliner (Portugal) Gastão Elias | 6–4, 3–6, [10–6] |
| Win | 18–7 | Apr 2016 | Turin, Italy | Challenger | Clay | (Chile) Hans Podlipnik Castillo | (Australia) Rameez Junaid (Poland) Mateusz Kowalczyk | 4–6, 7–6^{(7–3)}, [12–10] |
| Loss | 18–8 | Jun 2016 | Fürth, Germany | Challenger | Clay | (Austria) Tristan-Samuel Weissborn | (Argentina) Facundo Argüello (Venezuela) Roberto Maytín | 3–6, 4–6 |
| Loss | 18–9 | Jun 2016 | Poprad-Tatry, Slovakia | Challenger | Clay | (Czech Republic) Lukáš Dlouhý | (Uruguay) Ariel Behar (Kazakhstan) Andrey Golubev | 2–6, 7–5, [5–10] |
| Loss | 18–10 | Jul 2016 | Biella, Italy | Challenger | Clay | (Chile) Hans Podlipnik Castillo | (Germany) Andre Begemann (India) Leander Paes | 4–6, 4–6 |
| Win | 19–10 | Sep 2016 | Como, Italy | Challenger | Clay | (Czech Republic) Roman Jebavý | (Germany) Nils Langer (Austria) Gerald Melzer | 3–6, 6–1, [10–5] |
| Loss | 19–11 | Oct 2016 | Mohammedia, Morocco | Challenger | Clay | (Czech Republic) Roman Jebavý | (Croatia) Dino Marcan (Croatia) Antonio Šančić | 6–7^{(3–7)}, 4–6 |
| Win | 20–11 | Oct 2016 | Casablanca, Morocco | Challenger | Clay | (Czech Republic) Roman Jebavý | (Croatia) Dino Marcan (Croatia) Antonio Šančić | 6–4, 6–2 |
| Loss | 20–12 | Sep 2016 | Eckental, Germany | Challenger | Carpet (i) | (Czech Republic) Roman Jebavý | (Germany) Kevin Krawietz (France) Albano Olivetti | 7–6^{(10–8)}, 4–6, [7–10] |
| Loss | 20–13 | Aug 2018 | Cordenons, Italy | Challenger | Clay | (Spain) Daniel Muñoz de la Nava | (Ukraine) Denys Molchanov (Slovakia) Igor Zelenay | 6–3, 3–6, [9–11] |
| Win | 21–13 | Sep 2018 | Banja Luka, Bosnia and Herzegovina | Challenger | Clay | (Chile) Hans Podlipnik Castillo | (Lithuania) Laurynas Grigelis (Italy) Alessandro Motti | 7–5, 4–6, [10–7] |
| Win | 22–13 | Jun 2019 | Almaty, Kazakhstan | Challenger | Clay | (Chile) Hans Podlipnik Castillo | (Portugal) Gonçalo Oliveira (Belarus) Andrei Vasilevski | 7–6^{(7–4)}, 3–6, [10–8] |
| Win | 23–13 | Oct 2021 | Lošinj, Croatia | Challenger | Clay | (Austria) Tristan-Samuel Weissborn | (Romania) Victor Vlad Cornea (Turkey) Ergi Kırkın | 6–1, 7–6^{(7–5)} |
| Loss | 23–14 | Dec 2021 | Maia, Portugal | Challenger | Clay | (Portugal) Gonçalo Oliveira | (Portugal) Nuno Borges (Portugal) Francisco Cabral | 3-6, 4-6 |
| Loss | 23–15 | Jan 2022 | Santa Cruz de la Sierra, Bolivia | Challenger | Clay | (Austria) Tristan-Samuel Weissborn | (Ecuador) Diego Hidalgo (Colombia) Cristian Rodríguez | 6–4, 3–6, [8–10] |
| Loss | 23–16 | May 2022 | Prostějov, Czech Republic | Challenger | Clay | (Czech Republic) Roman Jebavý | (India) Yuki Bhambri (India) Saketh Myneni | 3-6, 5-7 |

== Top-10 wins per season ==
| # | Player | Rank | Event | Surface | Rd | Score |
|---|---|---|---|---|---|---|
2018
| 1. | (Spain) Pablo Carreño Busta | 10 | Quito, Ecuador | Clay | 2R | 6–4, 6–2 |
