= Challenger Pulcra Lachiter Biella =

Tennis tournament in Italy

Challenger Città di Biella
- 2025 Città di Biella

ATP Challenger Tour
- Event name: Città di Biella
- Location: Biella, Italy
- Venue: Tennis Lab Biella (2021-), Circolo di Tennis I Faggi di Biella
- Category: ATP Challenger Tour
- Surface: Clay
- Draw: 32S/32Q/16D
- Prize money: €54,000+H

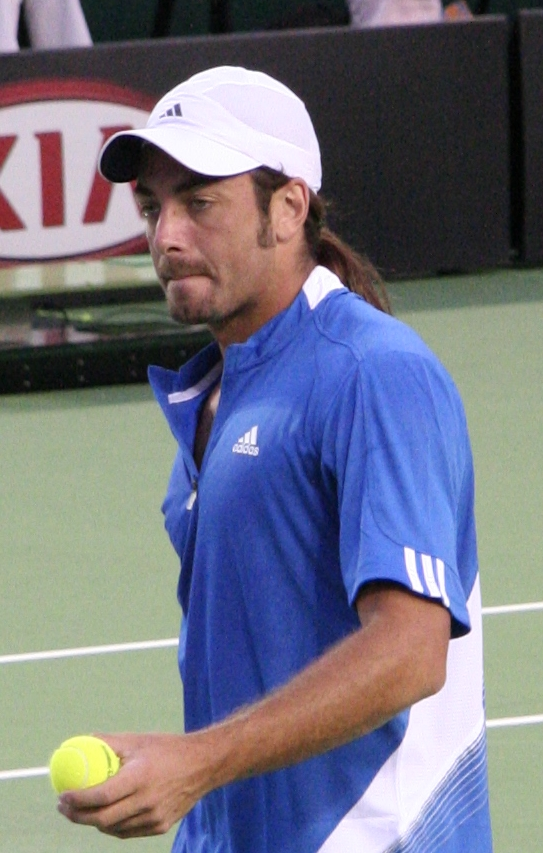
The Olympic champion Chilean Nicolás Massú is also amongst the event's champions, having taken the singles title in 1999

The Città di Biella (formerly known as Challenger Thindown, Pulcra Lachiter Biella and Canella) is a professional tennis tournament played on outdoor red clay courts. It is currently part of the Association of Tennis Professionals (ATP) Challenger Tour. It is held annually in Biella, Italy, since 1998. After a 3 year hiatus, it came back in 2025 as the Challenger Città di Biella.

== Past finals ==
=== Singles ===
Year	Champion	Runner-up	Score
2026	(Italy) Carlo Alberto Caniato	(Spain) Alejandro Moro Cañas	7–6^{(7–1)}, 6–4
2025	(Italy) Stefano Napolitano	(Switzerland) Kilian Feldbausch	7–5, 6–3
2022–24	Not held		
2021 (3)	(Denmark) Holger Rune	(Argentina) Marco Trungelliti	6–3, 5–7, 7–6^{(7–5)}
2021 (2)	(Australia) Thanasi Kokkinakis	(France) Enzo Couacaud	6–3, 6–4
2021 (1)	(Peru) Juan Pablo Varillas	(Argentina) Guido Andreozzi	6–3, 6–1
2020	(Argentina) Facundo Bagnis	(Slovenia) Blaž Kavčič	6–7^{(4–7)}, 6–4, 0–0 ret.
2019	(Italy) Gianluca Mager	(Italy) Paolo Lorenzi	6–0, 6–7^{(4–7)}, 7–5
2018	(Argentina) Federico Delbonis	(Italy) Stefano Napolitano	6–4, 6–3
2017	(Serbia) Filip Krajinović	(Italy) Salvatore Caruso	6–3, 6–2
2016	(Italy) Federico Gaio	(Brazil) Thomaz Bellucci	7–6^{(7–5)}, 6–2
2015	(Slovakia) Andrej Martin	(Argentina) Nicolás Kicker	6–2, 6–2
2014	(Italy) Matteo Viola	(Italy) Filippo Volandri	7–5, 6–1
2011–13	Not held		
2010	(Germany) Björn Phau	(Italy) Simone Bolelli	6–4, 6–2
2007–09	Not held		
2006	(Italy) Simone Bolelli	(Czech Republic) Ivo Minář	7–5, 3–6, 7–6
2005	(Georgia (country)) Irakli Labadze	(Argentina) Carlos Berlocq	7–6, 6–0
2004	Not held		
2003	(Italy) Filippo Volandri	(Argentina) José Acasuso	2–6, 7–6, 6–4
2002	(Slovakia) Dominik Hrbatý	(Argentina) José Acasuso	6–4, 6–7, 6–4
2001	(Romania) Adrian Voinea	(Belgium) Christophe Rochus	3–6, 6–3, 6–4
2000	(Italy) Filippo Volandri	(Argentina) Hernán Gumy	6–3, 6–2
1999	(Chile) Nicolás Massú	(Uzbekistan) Oleg Ogorodov	7–6, 5–7, 6–4
1998	(Australia) Andrew Ilie	(France) Jean-Baptiste Perlant	6–7, 6–4, 6–4

=== Doubles ===
Year	Champions	Runners-up	Score
2026	(Italy) Francesco Forti (Italy) Filippo Romano	(Italy) Franco Agamenone (Argentina) Máximo Zeitune	4–6, 7–5, [10–8]
2025	(Italy) Gianluca Cadenasso (Italy) Filippo Romano	(Belgium) Buvaysar Gadamauri (Netherlands) Jelle Sels	6–3, 7–5
2022–24	Not held		
2021 (3)	(Argentina) Tomás Martín Etcheverry (Argentina) Renzo Olivo	(Venezuela) Luis David Martínez (Spain) David Vega Hernández	3–6, 6–3, [10–8]
2021 (2)	(United States) Evan King (Germany) Julian Lenz	(Poland) Karol Drzewiecki (Spain) Sergio Martos Gornés	3–6, 6–3, [11–9]
2021 (1)	(Sweden) André Göransson (United States) Nathaniel Lammons	(Brazil) Rafael Matos (Brazil) Felipe Meligeni Alves	7–6^{(7–3)}, 6–3
2020	(Finland) Harri Heliövaara (Poland) Szymon Walków	(United Kingdom) Lloyd Glasspool (United States) Alex Lawson	7–5, 6–3
2019	(Bosnia and Herzegovina) Tomislav Brkić (Croatia) Ante Pavić	(Uruguay) Ariel Behar (Kazakhstan) Andrey Golubev	7–6^{(7–2)}, 6–4
2018	(Brazil) Fabrício Neis (Spain) David Vega Hernández	(Australia) Rameez Junaid (India) Purav Raja	6–4, 6–4
2017	(Hungary) Attila Balázs (Brazil) Fabiano de Paula	(Sweden) Johan Brunström (Croatia) Dino Marcan	5–7, 6–4, [10–4]
2016	(Germany) Andre Begemann (India) Leander Paes	(Slovakia) Andrej Martin (Chile) Hans Podlipnik	6–4, 6–4
2015	(Slovakia) Andrej Martin (Chile) Hans Podlipnik	(Romania) Alexandru-Daniel Carpen (Croatia) Dino Marcan	7–5, 1–6, [10–8]
2014	(Italy) Marco Cecchinato (Italy) Matteo Viola	(Germany) Frank Moser (Germany) Alexander Satschko	7–5, 6–0
2011–13	Not held		
2010	(United States) James Cerretani (Canada) Adil Shamasdin	(Jamaica) Dustin Brown (Italy) Alessandro Motti	6–3, 2–6, [11–9]
2007–09	Not held		
2006	(Argentina) Lucas Arnold Ker (Argentina) Agustín Calleri	(Argentina) Juan Martín del Potro (Argentina) Martín Vassallo Argüello	7–6, 6–2
2005	(Romania) Gabriel Trifu (Belgium) Tom Vanhoudt	(Argentina) Carlos Berlocq (Brazil) Ricardo Mello	6–4, 4–6, 6–4
2004	Not held		
2003	(Italy) Stefano Galvani (Argentina) Martín Vassallo Argüello	(Australia) Jordan Kerr (Belgium) Tom Vanhoudt	3–6, 7–6, 6–3
2002	(Italy) Giorgio Galimberti (Slovakia) Dominik Hrbatý	(Australia) Ashley Fisher (Australia) Nathan Healey	3–6, 6–3, 7–5
2001	(Italy) Enzo Artoni (Argentina) Andrés Schneiter	(Italy) Massimo Bertolini (Italy) Cristian Brandi	7–6, 4–6, 6–1
