= 2018 ITF Men's Circuit (July–September) =

The 2018 ITF Men's Circuit is the 2018 edition of the second-tier tour for men's professional tennis. It is organised by the International Tennis Federation and is a tier below the ATP Tour. The ITF Men's Circuit includes tournaments with prize money ranging from $15,000 up to $25,000.

== Key ==
$25,000 tournaments
$15,000 tournaments

== Month ==
=== July ===
Week of	Tournament	Winner	Runners-up	Semifinalists	Quarterfinalists
July 2	Canada F5 Futures; Saskatoon, Canada; Hard $25,000; Singles and doubles draws	(United States) Tom Fawcett; 6–2, 7–5	(United States) William Griffith	(United States) Evan Song (Australia) Jacob Grills	(Austria) Lucas Miedler (Canada) Alexis Galarneau (Switzerland) Marc-Andrea Hüsler (Canada) David Volfson
July 2	Canada F5 Futures; Saskatoon, Canada; Hard $25,000; Singles and doubles draws	(Switzerland) Marc-Andrea Hüsler (Netherlands) Sem Verbeek; 6–3, 6–3	(Canada) Alexis Galarneau (Canada) Benjamin Sigouin	(United States) Evan Song (Australia) Jacob Grills	(Austria) Lucas Miedler (Canada) Alexis Galarneau (Switzerland) Marc-Andrea Hüsler (Canada) David Volfson
July 2	China F9 Futures; Shenzhen, China; Hard $25,000; Singles and doubles draws	(China) Bai Yan; 6–7^{(6–8)}, 6–4, 6–4	(South Korea) Son Ji-hoon	(South Korea) Hong Seong-chan (South Korea) Song Min-kyu	(China) Zheng Weiqiang (China) Wu Hao (China) Hua Runhao (Japan) Shuichi Sekiguchi
July 2	China F9 Futures; Shenzhen, China; Hard $25,000; Singles and doubles draws	(South Korea) Nam Ji-sung (South Korea) Song Min-kyu; 3–6, 6–4, [10–4]	(China) Gao Xin (China) Wang Aoran	(South Korea) Hong Seong-chan (South Korea) Song Min-kyu	(China) Zheng Weiqiang (China) Wu Hao (China) Hua Runhao (Japan) Shuichi Sekiguchi
July 2	France F12 Futures; Bourg-en-Bresse, France; Clay $25,000; Singles and doubles draws	(France) Ugo Humbert; 6–3, 6–3	(France) Antoine Cornut-Chauvinc	(Switzerland) Yann Marti (France) Tak Khunn Wang	(Argentina) Tomás Lipovšek Puches (France) Fabien Reboul (France) Maxime Chazal (Argentina) Hernán Casanova
July 2	France F12 Futures; Bourg-en-Bresse, France; Clay $25,000; Singles and doubles draws	(France) Dan Added (France) Ugo Humbert; 2–6, 6–1, [10–5]	(France) Jérôme Inzerillo (France) Alexis Musialek	(Switzerland) Yann Marti (France) Tak Khunn Wang	(Argentina) Tomás Lipovšek Puches (France) Fabien Reboul (France) Maxime Chazal (Argentina) Hernán Casanova
July 2	Hong Kong F2 Futures; Hong Kong; Hard $25,000; Singles and doubles draws	(Australia) Maverick Banes; 7–5, 6–2	(Japan) Shintaro Imai	(United States) Nicholas Hu (Japan) Ryota Tanuma	(Japan) Yuta Shimizu (Australia) Aaron Addison (Japan) Issei Okamura (Hong Kong) Anthony Jackie Tang
July 2	Hong Kong F2 Futures; Hong Kong; Hard $25,000; Singles and doubles draws	(Japan) Yuta Shimizu (Japan) Kaito Uesugi; 7–5, 6–0	(Thailand) Congsup Congcar (Japan) Issei Okamura	(United States) Nicholas Hu (Japan) Ryota Tanuma	(Japan) Yuta Shimizu (Australia) Aaron Addison (Japan) Issei Okamura (Hong Kong) Anthony Jackie Tang
July 2	Spain F17 Futures; Bakio, Spain; Hard $25,000; Singles and doubles draws	(Spain) Roberto Ortega Olmedo; 6–2, 3–0, ret.	(France) Hugo Grenier	(Spain) Sergio Gutiérrez Ferrol (Kazakhstan) Denis Yevseyev	(Turkey) Altuğ Çelikbilek (Spain) Alejandro Davidovich Fokina (Spain) Alberto Barroso Campos (Hungary) Zsombor Piros
July 2	Spain F17 Futures; Bakio, Spain; Hard $25,000; Singles and doubles draws	(Ukraine) Marat Deviatiarov (United Kingdom) Evan Hoyt; 6–7^{(7–4)}, 7–5, [10–5]	(Belarus) Sergey Betov (Russia) Ivan Gakhov	(Spain) Sergio Gutiérrez Ferrol (Kazakhstan) Denis Yevseyev	(Turkey) Altuğ Çelikbilek (Spain) Alejandro Davidovich Fokina (Spain) Alberto Barroso Campos (Hungary) Zsombor Piros
July 2	USA F19 Futures; Wichita, United States; Hard $25,000; Singles and doubles draws	(Russia) Evgeny Karlovskiy; 6–4, 6–4	(Australia) Aleksandar Vukic	(United Kingdom) Ryan Peniston (Australia) Andrew Harris	(Slovenia) Matic Špec (United States) Reese Stalder (United States) Martin Redlicki (United States) Brandon Holt
July 2	USA F19 Futures; Wichita, United States; Hard $25,000; Singles and doubles draws	(France) Maxime Cressy (United States) Brandon Holt; 3–6, 6–2, [10–6]	(United States) Hunter Johnson (United States) Yates Johnson	(United Kingdom) Ryan Peniston (Australia) Andrew Harris	(Slovenia) Matic Špec (United States) Reese Stalder (United States) Martin Redlicki (United States) Brandon Holt
July 2	Austria F1 Futures; Telfs, Austria; Clay $15,000; Singles and doubles draws	(Spain) Mario Vilella Martínez; 6–4, 6–4	(Austria) Matthias Haim	(Russia) Bogdan Bobrov (Brazil) Bruno Sant'Anna	(Italy) Giorgio Portaluri (Netherlands) Mick Veldheer (Argentina) Manuel Peña López (Italy) Riccardo Bellotti
July 2	Austria F1 Futures; Telfs, Austria; Clay $15,000; Singles and doubles draws	(Italy) Marco Bortolotti (Spain) Mario Vilella Martínez; 6–1, 3–6, [10–4]	(Austria) Alexander Erler (Russia) Kirill Kivattsev	(Russia) Bogdan Bobrov (Brazil) Bruno Sant'Anna	(Italy) Giorgio Portaluri (Netherlands) Mick Veldheer (Argentina) Manuel Peña López (Italy) Riccardo Bellotti
July 2	Belgium F3 Futures; Lasne, Belgium; Clay $15,000; Singles and doubles draws	(Belgium) Omar Salman; 7–6^{(7–2)}, 6–1	(Belgium) Germain Gigounon	(Belgium) Michael Geerts (Sweden) Dragoș Nicolae Mădăraș	(Belgium) Christopher Heyman (Croatia) Franjo Raspudić (Belgium) Jonas Merckx (Belgium) Yannick Vandenbulcke
July 2	Belgium F3 Futures; Lasne, Belgium; Clay $15,000; Singles and doubles draws	(Belgium) Germain Gigounon (Belgium) Jeroen Vanneste; 6–3, 6–1	(Brazil) Eduardo Dischinger (Chile) Juan Carlos Sáez	(Belgium) Michael Geerts (Sweden) Dragoș Nicolae Mădăraș	(Belgium) Christopher Heyman (Croatia) Franjo Raspudić (Belgium) Jonas Merckx (Belgium) Yannick Vandenbulcke
July 2	Czech Republic F5 Futures; Ústí nad Orlicí, Czech Republic; Clay $15,000; Singles and doubles draws	(Czech Republic) David Poljak; 6–4, 6–4	(Czech Republic) Vít Kopřiva	(Czech Republic) Marek Jaloviec (Czech Republic) Patrik Rikl	(Russia) Aleksandr Vasilenko (Brazil) Oscar José Gutierrez (Czech Republic) Jan Mertl (Czech Republic) Tomáš Macháč
July 2	Czech Republic F5 Futures; Ústí nad Orlicí, Czech Republic; Clay $15,000; Singles and doubles draws	(Slovakia) Filip Polášek (Czech Republic) Patrik Rikl; 7–6^{(7–2)}, 7–6^{(7–5)}	(Czech Republic) Antonín Bolardt (Czech Republic) Tomáš Macháč	(Czech Republic) Marek Jaloviec (Czech Republic) Patrik Rikl	(Russia) Aleksandr Vasilenko (Brazil) Oscar José Gutierrez (Czech Republic) Jan Mertl (Czech Republic) Tomáš Macháč
July 2	Germany F6 Futures; Saarlouis, Germany; Clay $15,000; Singles and doubles draws	(Russia) Philipp Davydenko; 6–4, 7–6^{(7–4)}	(Germany) Louis Wessels	(Hungary) Péter Nagy (Germany) Christoph Negritu	(Romania) Vasile Antonescu (Russia) Shalva Dzhanashiya (Germany) Paul Wörner (France) Jonathan Kanar
July 2	Germany F6 Futures; Saarlouis, Germany; Clay $15,000; Singles and doubles draws	(Argentina) Santiago Besada (Argentina) Juan Ignacio Galarza; 6–4, 4–6, [10–8]	(Spain) Marco Neubau (Germany) Robert Strombachs	(Hungary) Péter Nagy (Germany) Christoph Negritu	(Romania) Vasile Antonescu (Russia) Shalva Dzhanashiya (Germany) Paul Wörner (France) Jonathan Kanar
July 2	Italy F17 Futures; Albinea, Italy; Clay $15,000; Singles and doubles draws	(Italy) Pietro Rondoni; 2–6, 6–1, 6–4	(Italy) Davide Galoppini	(Romania) Alexandru Jecan (Mexico) Lucas Gómez	(Italy) Giovanni Fonio (Italy) Andres Gabriel Ciurletti (Italy) Riccardo Bonadio (Italy) Fabrizio Ornago
July 2	Italy F17 Futures; Albinea, Italy; Clay $15,000; Singles and doubles draws	(Italy) Omar Giacalone (Italy) Pietro Rondoni; 6–3, 6–3	(Italy) Fabrizio Ornago (Argentina) Matías Zukas	(Romania) Alexandru Jecan (Mexico) Lucas Gómez	(Italy) Giovanni Fonio (Italy) Andres Gabriel Ciurletti (Italy) Riccardo Bonadio (Italy) Fabrizio Ornago
July 2	Malaysia F1 Futures; Kuala Lumpur, Malaysia; Hard $15,000; Singles and doubles draws	(South Korea) Kim Cheong-eui; 6–3, 7–5	(Spain) David Pérez Sanz	(Réunion) Quentin Robert (Italy) Marco Brugnerotto	(United States) Connor Farren (Cyprus) Michail Pervolarakis (Japan) Soichiro Moritani (India) Siddharth Vishwakarma
July 2	Malaysia F1 Futures; Kuala Lumpur, Malaysia; Hard $15,000; Singles and doubles draws	(Japan) Soichiro Moritani (Chinese Taipei) Yu Cheng-yu; 6–2, 6–3	(Australia) Michael Look (Australia) Lucas Vuradin	(Réunion) Quentin Robert (Italy) Marco Brugnerotto	(United States) Connor Farren (Cyprus) Michail Pervolarakis (Japan) Soichiro Moritani (India) Siddharth Vishwakarma
July 2	Netherlands F2 Futures; The Hague, Netherlands; Clay $15,000; Singles and doubles draws	(Netherlands) Jelle Sels; 6–2, 6–3	(Russia) Alexander Zhurbin	(Finland) Harri Heliövaara (Finland) Patrik Niklas-Salminen	(Russia) Denis Klok (Netherlands) Botic van de Zandschulp (Netherlands) Ryan Nijboer (Netherlands) Bart van den Berg
July 2	Netherlands F2 Futures; The Hague, Netherlands; Clay $15,000; Singles and doubles draws	(Netherlands) Botic van de Zandschulp (Netherlands) Tim van Terheijden; 3–6, 6–3, [11–9]	(Netherlands) Gijs Brouwer (Netherlands) Jelle Sels	(Finland) Harri Heliövaara (Finland) Patrik Niklas-Salminen	(Russia) Denis Klok (Netherlands) Botic van de Zandschulp (Netherlands) Ryan Nijboer (Netherlands) Bart van den Berg
July 2	Portugal F11 Futures; Castelo Branco, Portugal; Hard $15,000; Singles and doubles draws	(United Kingdom) Mark Whitehouse; 6–4, 6–4	(Portugal) Nuno Borges	(Spain) Pablo Vivero González (Portugal) Fred Gil	(France) Maxime Tchoutakian (Spain) Iván Marrero Curbelo (France) Romain Bauvy (Guatemala) Wilfredo González
July 2	Portugal F11 Futures; Castelo Branco, Portugal; Hard $15,000; Singles and doubles draws	(Portugal) Nuno Borges (Portugal) Francisco Cabral; 1–6, 7–6^{(7–4)}, [10–8]	(France) Maxime Tchoutakian (France) Hugo Voljacques	(Spain) Pablo Vivero González (Portugal) Fred Gil	(France) Maxime Tchoutakian (Spain) Iván Marrero Curbelo (France) Romain Bauvy (Guatemala) Wilfredo González
July 9	China F10 Futures; Shenzhen, China; Hard $25,000; Singles and doubles draws	(China) Te Rigele; 4–6, 6–4, 6–3	(China) Wu Yibing	(Australia) Blake Ellis (China) Bai Yan	(South Korea) Nam Ji-sung (Chinese Taipei) Wu Tung-lin (China) Zeng Shihong (China) Zhao Lingxi
July 9	China F10 Futures; Shenzhen, China; Hard $25,000; Singles and doubles draws	(South Korea) Nam Ji-sung (South Korea) Song Min-kyu; 7–6^{(7–3)}, 6–2	(Chinese Taipei) Chen Ti (New Zealand) Rubin Statham	(Australia) Blake Ellis (China) Bai Yan	(South Korea) Nam Ji-sung (Chinese Taipei) Wu Tung-lin (China) Zeng Shihong (China) Zhao Lingxi
July 9	France F13 Futures; Ajaccio, France; Hard $25,000+H; Singles and doubles draws	(Russia) Aslan Karatsev; 7–6^{(8–6)}, 4–6, 6–3	(France) Rémi Boutillier	(Japan) Sora Fukuda (France) Arthur Rinderknech	(France) Laurent Rochette (Belgium) Yannick Mertens (France) Hugo Pontico (France) Valentin Vacherot
July 9	France F13 Futures; Ajaccio, France; Hard $25,000+H; Singles and doubles draws	(France) Mick Lescure (Belgium) Yannick Mertens; 7–5, 7–6^{(8–6)}	(Ukraine) Marat Deviatiarov (Zimbabwe) Benjamin Lock	(Japan) Sora Fukuda (France) Arthur Rinderknech	(France) Laurent Rochette (Belgium) Yannick Mertens (France) Hugo Pontico (France) Valentin Vacherot
July 9	Italy F18 Futures; Casinalbo, Italy; Clay $25,000; Singles and doubles draws	(Netherlands) Jelle Sels; 6–0, 6–3	(China) Zhang Zhizhen	(Germany) Sebastian Fanselow (Argentina) Genaro Alberto Olivieri	(France) Maxime Chazal (Argentina) Matías Zukas (Italy) Davide Galoppini (Argentina) Camilo Ugo Carabelli
July 9	Italy F18 Futures; Casinalbo, Italy; Clay $25,000; Singles and doubles draws	(Argentina) Genaro Alberto Olivieri (Argentina) Camilo Ugo Carabelli; 6–4, 3–6, [12–10]	(Russia) Ivan Gakhov (Argentina) Matías Zukas	(Germany) Sebastian Fanselow (Argentina) Genaro Alberto Olivieri	(France) Maxime Chazal (Argentina) Matías Zukas (Italy) Davide Galoppini (Argentina) Camilo Ugo Carabelli
July 9	Spain F18 Futures; Getxo, Spain; Clay $25,000; Singles and doubles draws	(Argentina) Pedro Cachin; 6–3, 7–5	(Spain) Carlos Boluda-Purkiss	(Spain) Jaume Pla Malfeito (Spain) Javier Barranco Cosano	(France) Matthieu Perchicot (Switzerland) Vullnet Tashi (Spain) Alberto Romero de Ávila Senise (Spain) Andrés Fernández Cánovas
July 9	Spain F18 Futures; Getxo, Spain; Clay $25,000; Singles and doubles draws	(Guatemala) Christopher Díaz Figueroa (Guatemala) Wilfredo González; 7–5, 3–6, [10–8]	(Spain) Javier Barranco Cosano (Italy) Raúl Brancaccio	(Spain) Jaume Pla Malfeito (Spain) Javier Barranco Cosano	(France) Matthieu Perchicot (Switzerland) Vullnet Tashi (Spain) Alberto Romero de Ávila Senise (Spain) Andrés Fernández Cánovas
July 9	Austria F2 Futures; Kramsach, Austria; Clay $15,000; Singles and doubles draws	(Bosnia and Herzegovina) Nerman Fatić; 1–6, 6–3, 6–1	(Germany) Johannes Härteis	(Germany) Peter Heller (Brazil) Eduardo Dischinger	(Germany) Lukas Ollert (Romania) Călin Manda (Bulgaria) Alexandar Lazarov (North Macedonia) Tomislav Jotovski
July 9	Austria F2 Futures; Kramsach, Austria; Clay $15,000; Singles and doubles draws	(Germany) Johannes Härteis (Germany) Peter Heller; 6–3, 6–4	(Czech Republic) Filip Duda (Turkey) Ergi Kırkın	(Germany) Peter Heller (Brazil) Eduardo Dischinger	(Germany) Lukas Ollert (Romania) Călin Manda (Bulgaria) Alexandar Lazarov (North Macedonia) Tomislav Jotovski
July 9	Czech Republic F6 Futures; Brno, Czech Republic; Clay $15,000; Singles and doubles draws	(Czech Republic) Jan Mertl; 6–3, 6–4	(Czech Republic) Tomáš Jiroušek	(Czech Republic) Patrik Rikl (Russia) Aleksandr Vasilenko	(Czech Republic) Marek Jaloviec (Czech Republic) Tadeáš Paroulek (Japan) Rio Noguchi (Czech Republic) Dominik Kellovský
July 9	Czech Republic F6 Futures; Brno, Czech Republic; Clay $15,000; Singles and doubles draws	(Czech Republic) Petr Nouza (Czech Republic) David Škoch; 6–3, 2–6, [14–12]	(Slovakia) Filip Polášek (Czech Republic) Patrik Rikl	(Czech Republic) Patrik Rikl (Russia) Aleksandr Vasilenko	(Czech Republic) Marek Jaloviec (Czech Republic) Tadeáš Paroulek (Japan) Rio Noguchi (Czech Republic) Dominik Kellovský
July 9	Georgia F1 Futures; Telavi, Georgia; Clay $15,000; Singles and doubles draws	(Argentina) Nicolás Alberto Arreche; 7–5, 7–5	(Georgia (country)) Aleksandre Metreveli	(Georgia (country)) Aleksandre Bakshi (Russia) Alexey Zakharov	(Ukraine) Vladyslav Orlov (Belarus) Mikalai Haliak (Georgia (country)) George Tsivadze (United States) Maksim Tikhomirov
July 9	Georgia F1 Futures; Telavi, Georgia; Clay $15,000; Singles and doubles draws	(Georgia (country)) Aleksandre Bakshi (Georgia (country)) George Tsivadze; 7–6^{(7–4)}, 6–3	(Kazakhstan) Roman Khassanov (Ukraine) Vladyslav Orlov	(Georgia (country)) Aleksandre Bakshi (Russia) Alexey Zakharov	(Ukraine) Vladyslav Orlov (Belarus) Mikalai Haliak (Georgia (country)) George Tsivadze (United States) Maksim Tikhomirov
July 9	Germany F7 Futures; Bad Schussenried, Germany; Clay $15,000; Singles and doubles draws	(Austria) Matthias Haim; 6–3, 6–4	(Spain) Mario Vilella Martínez	(Belgium) Jonas Merckx (Argentina) Matías Franco Descotte	(Germany) Christoph Negritu (Benin) Alexis Klégou (Germany) Niklas Schell (Argentina) Juan Ignacio Galarza
July 9	Germany F7 Futures; Bad Schussenried, Germany; Clay $15,000; Singles and doubles draws	(Colombia) José Daniel Bendeck (Colombia) Eduardo Struvay; 6–2, 6–2	(Germany) Kai Lemstra (Germany) Christoph Negritu	(Belgium) Jonas Merckx (Argentina) Matías Franco Descotte	(Germany) Christoph Negritu (Benin) Alexis Klégou (Germany) Niklas Schell (Argentina) Juan Ignacio Galarza
July 9	Malaysia F2 Futures; Kuala Lumpur, Malaysia; Hard $15,000; Singles and doubles draws	(Japan) Ryota Tanuma; 6–1, 6–1	(France) Gabriel Petit	(Japan) Soichiro Moritani (South Korea) Kim Cheong-eui	(Spain) David Pérez Sanz (Thailand) Pruchya Isaro (Spain) Marc Fornell Mestres (Cyprus) Michail Pervolarakis
July 9	Malaysia F2 Futures; Kuala Lumpur, Malaysia; Hard $15,000; Singles and doubles draws	(United States) John Paul Fruttero (Spain) David Pérez Sanz; 6–4, 6–4	(South Korea) Kim Cheong-eui (South Korea) Noh Sang-woo	(Japan) Soichiro Moritani (South Korea) Kim Cheong-eui	(Spain) David Pérez Sanz (Thailand) Pruchya Isaro (Spain) Marc Fornell Mestres (Cyprus) Michail Pervolarakis
July 9	Netherlands F3 Futures; Amstelveen, Netherlands; Clay $15,000; Singles and doubles draws	(Netherlands) Tim van Rijthoven; 6–2, 6–4	(Netherlands) Sidané Pontjodikromo	(Peru) Arklon Huertas del Pino (Brazil) Orlando Luz	(United States) Sekou Bangoura (Russia) Alexander Zhurbin (Netherlands) Niels Lootsma (Finland) Emil Ruusuvuori
July 9	Netherlands F3 Futures; Amstelveen, Netherlands; Clay $15,000; Singles and doubles draws	(Netherlands) Michiel de Krom (Netherlands) Ryan Nijboer; 6–7^{(0–7)}, 6–3, [10–5]	(Romania) Vasile Antonescu (United States) Sekou Bangoura	(Peru) Arklon Huertas del Pino (Brazil) Orlando Luz	(United States) Sekou Bangoura (Russia) Alexander Zhurbin (Netherlands) Niels Lootsma (Finland) Emil Ruusuvuori
July 16	China F11 Futures; Kunshan, China; Hard $25,000; Singles and doubles draws	(China) Bai Yan; 6–3, 6–3	(China) Cui Jie	(China) Wang Huixin (China) Hua Runhao	(China) Wang Aoran (United States) Mitchell Thomas McDaniels (China) Zhao Lingxi (India) Aryan Goveas
July 16	China F11 Futures; Kunshan, China; Hard $25,000; Singles and doubles draws	(China) Hua Runhao (China) Zeng Shihong; 6–3, 6–3	(China) Wu Hao (China) Zou Weibowen	(China) Wang Huixin (China) Hua Runhao	(China) Wang Aoran (United States) Mitchell Thomas McDaniels (China) Zhao Lingxi (India) Aryan Goveas
July 16	Chinese Taipei F1 Futures; Taipei, Taiwan; Hard $25,000; Singles and doubles draws	(Chinese Taipei) Hsu Yu-hsiou; 6–2, 6–3	(United States) Michael Zhu	(Bulgaria) Vasko Mladenov (Chinese Taipei) Chen Ti	(Hong Kong) Wong Chun-hun (United States) Nicholas Hu (Australia) Blake Ellis (Japan) Yuta Kawahashi
July 16	Chinese Taipei F1 Futures; Taipei, Taiwan; Hard $25,000; Singles and doubles draws	(Hong Kong) Wong Chun-hun (Hong Kong) Yeung Pak-long; 7–6^{(7–5)}, 6–2	(Chinese Taipei) Yu Cheng-yu (United States) Michael Zhu	(Bulgaria) Vasko Mladenov (Chinese Taipei) Chen Ti	(Hong Kong) Wong Chun-hun (United States) Nicholas Hu (Australia) Blake Ellis (Japan) Yuta Kawahashi
July 16	Germany F8 Futures; Kassel, Germany; Clay $25,000+H; Singles and doubles draws	(Brazil) Orlando Luz; 6–4, 4–6, 6–3	(Brazil) João Souza	(Germany) Julian Lenz (Argentina) Manuel Peña López	(Italy) Marco Bortolotti (Brazil) Bruno Sant'Anna (Brazil) Felipe Meligeni Alves (Belgium) Christopher Heyman
July 16	Germany F8 Futures; Kassel, Germany; Clay $25,000+H; Singles and doubles draws	(Brazil) João Souza (Spain) David Vega Hernández; 6–1, 6–4	(Brazil) Orlando Luz (Brazil) Marcelo Zormann	(Germany) Julian Lenz (Argentina) Manuel Peña López	(Italy) Marco Bortolotti (Brazil) Bruno Sant'Anna (Brazil) Felipe Meligeni Alves (Belgium) Christopher Heyman
July 16	Spain F19 Futures; Gandia, Spain; Clay $25,000; Singles and doubles draws	(Spain) Marc Giner; 7–5, 6–2	(Spain) Álvaro López San Martín	(Spain) Carlos López Montagud (Italy) Raúl Brancaccio	(Spain) Pol Martín Tiffon (Poland) Maciej Rajski (Brazil) Jordan Correia (Ecuador) Diego Hidalgo
July 16	Spain F19 Futures; Gandia, Spain; Clay $25,000; Singles and doubles draws	(Spain) Javier Barranco Cosano (Italy) Raúl Brancaccio; 4–6, 6–2, [10–5]	(Bolivia) Boris Arias (Ecuador) Diego Hidalgo	(Spain) Carlos López Montagud (Italy) Raúl Brancaccio	(Spain) Pol Martín Tiffon (Poland) Maciej Rajski (Brazil) Jordan Correia (Ecuador) Diego Hidalgo
July 16	USA F19B Futures; Iowa City, United States; Hard $25,000; Singles and doubles draws	(United Kingdom) Lloyd Glasspool; 7–6^{(7–2)}, 7–6^{(7–1)}	(Russia) Evgeny Karlovskiy	(United States) Collin Altamirano (United States) Alexander Brown	(France) Sébastien Boltz (Syria) Kareem Al Allaf (United States) Nick Chappell (United Kingdom) Tom Farquharson
July 16	USA F19B Futures; Iowa City, United States; Hard $25,000; Singles and doubles draws	(United States) Alec Adamson (United States) Nick Chappell; 2–6, 6–2, [10–6]	(United States) Felix Corwin (Slovenia) Matic Špec	(United States) Collin Altamirano (United States) Alexander Brown	(France) Sébastien Boltz (Syria) Kareem Al Allaf (United States) Nick Chappell (United Kingdom) Tom Farquharson
July 16	Austria F3 Futures; Wels, Austria; Clay $15,000; Singles and doubles draws	(Czech Republic) Michael Vrbenský; 7–5, 4–6, 6–3	(Bosnia and Herzegovina) Nerman Fatić	(Russia) Alexander Shevchenko (Bulgaria) Alexandar Lazov	(Russia) Ivan Davydov (Germany) Johannes Härteis (Czech Republic) Michal Konečný (Peru) Jorge Panta
July 16	Austria F3 Futures; Wels, Austria; Clay $15,000; Singles and doubles draws	(Czech Republic) Filip Duda (Czech Republic) Michael Vrbenský; 7–5, 7–6^{(7–5)}	(Czech Republic) Petr Nouza (Czech Republic) David Škoch	(Russia) Alexander Shevchenko (Bulgaria) Alexandar Lazov	(Russia) Ivan Davydov (Germany) Johannes Härteis (Czech Republic) Michal Konečný (Peru) Jorge Panta
July 16	Belgium F4 Futures; Knokke, Belgium; Clay $15,000; Singles and doubles draws	(France) Samuel Brosset; 6–4, 7–5	(Belgium) Jonas Merckx	(Argentina) Franco Emanuel Egea (United States) Jeremy Sonkin	(Netherlands) Stephan Gerritsen (France) Maxence Bertimon (France) Jaimee Floyd Angele (Belgium) Michael Geerts
July 16	Belgium F4 Futures; Knokke, Belgium; Clay $15,000; Singles and doubles draws	(Netherlands) Maikel Borg (Netherlands) Stephan Gerritsen; 6–3, 6–4	(Belgium) Michael Geerts (Belgium) Jonas Merckx	(Argentina) Franco Emanuel Egea (United States) Jeremy Sonkin	(Netherlands) Stephan Gerritsen (France) Maxence Bertimon (France) Jaimee Floyd Angele (Belgium) Michael Geerts
July 16	Estonia F1 Futures; Pärnu, Estonia; Clay $15,000; Singles and doubles draws	(Sweden) Dragoș Nicolae Mădăraș; 6–2, 6–3	(Russia) Markos Kalovelonis	(Finland) Patrik Niklas-Salminen (Brazil) João Lucas Reis da Silva	(Finland) Emil Ruusuvuori (Russia) Denis Klok (Latvia) Mārtiņš Podžus (Estonia) Mattias Siimar
July 16	Estonia F1 Futures; Pärnu, Estonia; Clay $15,000; Singles and doubles draws	(Netherlands) Marc Dijkhuizen (Netherlands) Bart Stevens; 6–4, 6–2	(Russia) Markos Kalovelonis (Russia) Denis Klok	(Finland) Patrik Niklas-Salminen (Brazil) João Lucas Reis da Silva	(Finland) Emil Ruusuvuori (Russia) Denis Klok (Latvia) Mārtiņš Podžus (Estonia) Mattias Siimar
July 16	France F14 Futures; Uriage, France; Clay $15,000; Singles and doubles draws	(Belgium) Jeroen Vanneste; 3–6, 6–2, 6–4	(France) Maxime Mora	(Colombia) Eduardo Struvay (France) Constantin Bittoun Kouzmine	(France) Maxime Hamou (France) Hugo Voljacques (Switzerland) Johan Nikles (France) Nathan Seateun
July 16	France F14 Futures; Uriage, France; Clay $15,000; Singles and doubles draws	(France) Maxime Tchoutakian (France) Hugo Voljacques; 7–6^{(7–3)}, 2–6, [10–4]	(France) Titouan Droguet (France) Clément Tabur	(Colombia) Eduardo Struvay (France) Constantin Bittoun Kouzmine	(France) Maxime Hamou (France) Hugo Voljacques (Switzerland) Johan Nikles (France) Nathan Seateun
July 16	Georgia F2 Futures; Telavi, Georgia; Clay $15,000; Singles and doubles draws	(Russia) Artem Dubrivnyy; 6–2, 2–6, 6–2	(Iran) Shahin Khaledan	(Ukraine) Oleg Prihodko (Turkey) Koray Kırcı	(Russia) Ronald Slobodchikov (Romania) Vasile-Alexandru Ghilea (Russia) Maxim Ratniuk (Russia) Kristian Lozan
July 16	Georgia F2 Futures; Telavi, Georgia; Clay $15,000; Singles and doubles draws	(Lithuania) Tadas Babelis (Russia) Ronald Slobodchikov; 7–6^{(7–5)}, 7–6^{(7–5)}	(Argentina) Nicolás Alberto Arreche (Argentina) Franco Feitt	(Ukraine) Oleg Prihodko (Turkey) Koray Kırcı	(Russia) Ronald Slobodchikov (Romania) Vasile-Alexandru Ghilea (Russia) Maxim Ratniuk (Russia) Kristian Lozan
July 16	Italy F19 Futures; Gubbio, Italy; Clay $15,000; Singles and doubles draws	(Argentina) Camilo Ugo Carabelli; 6–7^{(1–7)}, 6–1, 6–2	(Argentina) Genaro Alberto Olivieri	(Italy) Lorenzo Frigerio (Argentina) Matías Zukas	(Italy) Alexander Weis (Italy) Walter Trusendi (Argentina) Tomás Martín Etcheverry (Italy) Alessandro Ceppellini
July 16	Italy F19 Futures; Gubbio, Italy; Clay $15,000; Singles and doubles draws	(Italy) Francesco Forti (Italy) Mattia Frinzi; 6–3, 6–2	(Italy) Lorenzo Frigerio (Ukraine) Daniil Zarichanskyy	(Italy) Lorenzo Frigerio (Argentina) Matías Zukas	(Italy) Alexander Weis (Italy) Walter Trusendi (Argentina) Tomás Martín Etcheverry (Italy) Alessandro Ceppellini
July 16	Malaysia F3 Futures; Kuala Lumpur, Malaysia; Hard $15,000; Singles and doubles draws	(Poland) Maciej Smoła; 6–3, 3–6, 6–3	(Cyprus) Michail Pervolarakis	(South Korea) Kim Cheong-eui (France) Gabriel Petit	(United Kingdom) Isaac Stoute (Australia) Lucas Vuradin (Italy) Marco Brugnerotto (Australia) Michael Look
July 16	Malaysia F3 Futures; Kuala Lumpur, Malaysia; Hard $15,000; Singles and doubles draws	(South Korea) Kim Cheong-eui (South Korea) Noh Sang-woo; 6–1, 3–6, [10–5]	(Philippines) Francis Alcantara (United States) John Paul Fruttero	(South Korea) Kim Cheong-eui (France) Gabriel Petit	(United Kingdom) Isaac Stoute (Australia) Lucas Vuradin (Italy) Marco Brugnerotto (Australia) Michael Look
July 16	Morocco F1 Futures; Khemisset, Morocco; Clay $15,000; Singles and doubles draws	(Morocco) Lamine Ouahab; 2–6, 6–0, 6–1	(Argentina) Juan Pablo Paz	(Argentina) Tomás Lipovšek Puches (France) Arthur Rinderknech	(Spain) Nikolás Sánchez Izquierdo (Switzerland) Mirko Martinez (France) Quentin Folliot (United Kingdom) Imran Aswat
July 16	Morocco F1 Futures; Khemisset, Morocco; Clay $15,000; Singles and doubles draws	(Argentina) Tomás Lipovšek Puches (Argentina) Juan Pablo Paz; 6–2, 7–5	(Spain) Fernando Bogajo (Peru) Mauricio Echazú	(Argentina) Tomás Lipovšek Puches (France) Arthur Rinderknech	(Spain) Nikolás Sánchez Izquierdo (Switzerland) Mirko Martinez (France) Quentin Folliot (United Kingdom) Imran Aswat
July 23	Chinese Taipei F2 Futures; Taipei, Taiwan; Hard $25,000; Singles and doubles draws	(Chinese Taipei) Tseng Chun-hsin; 6–1, 6–7^{(5–7)}, 7–6^{(7–1)}	(Chinese Taipei) Chen Ti	(Chinese Taipei) Lin Wei-de (Chinese Taipei) Hsu Yu-hsiou	(Chinese Taipei) Peng Hsien-yin (Italy) Francesco Vilardo (Hong Kong) Wong Hong-kit (Zimbabwe) Benjamin Lock
July 23	Chinese Taipei F2 Futures; Taipei, Taiwan; Hard $25,000; Singles and doubles draws	(Chinese Taipei) Hsu Yu-hsiou (United States) Nicholas Hu; 7–5, 7–6^{(7–5)}	(Hong Kong) Wong Chun-hun (Hong Kong) Yeung Pak-long	(Chinese Taipei) Lin Wei-de (Chinese Taipei) Hsu Yu-hsiou	(Chinese Taipei) Peng Hsien-yin (Italy) Francesco Vilardo (Hong Kong) Wong Hong-kit (Zimbabwe) Benjamin Lock
July 23	Ecuador F1 Futures; Manta, Ecuador; Hard $25,000; Singles and doubles draws	(Ecuador) Emilio Gómez; 6–2, 7–5	(United States) Jordi Arconada	(Bolivia) Juan Carlos Aguilar (Argentina) Mateo Nicolás Martínez	(Ecuador) Antonio Cayetano March (Portugal) Bernardo Saraiva (Spain) José Francisco Vidal Azorín (Argentina) Facundo Juárez
July 23	Ecuador F1 Futures; Manta, Ecuador; Hard $25,000; Singles and doubles draws	(United States) Jordi Arconada (Ecuador) Emilio Gómez; 7–5, 6–3	(Brazil) Oscar José Gutierrez (Portugal) Bernardo Saraiva	(Bolivia) Juan Carlos Aguilar (Argentina) Mateo Nicolás Martínez	(Ecuador) Antonio Cayetano March (Portugal) Bernardo Saraiva (Spain) José Francisco Vidal Azorín (Argentina) Facundo Juárez
July 23	France F15 Futures; Troyes, France; Clay $25,000; Singles and doubles draws	(Brazil) Bruno Sant'Anna; 6–2, 6–4	(France) Fabien Reboul	(France) Dan Added (France) Constantin Bittoun Kouzmine	(France) Antoine Cornut-Chauvinc (France) Lény Mitjana (France) Joffrey de Schepper (France) Florent Diep
July 23	France F15 Futures; Troyes, France; Clay $25,000; Singles and doubles draws	(Germany) David Klier (Brazil) Bruno Sant'Anna; 6–2, 6–2	(France) Dan Added (France) Hugo Voljacques	(France) Dan Added (France) Constantin Bittoun Kouzmine	(France) Antoine Cornut-Chauvinc (France) Lény Mitjana (France) Joffrey de Schepper (France) Florent Diep
July 23	Italy F20 Futures; Pontedera, Italy; Clay $25,000+H; Singles and doubles draws	(Italy) Riccardo Balzerani; Walkover	(Argentina) Camilo Ugo Carabelli	(Brazil) José Pereira (Argentina) Genaro Alberto Olivieri	(Brazil) Daniel Dutra da Silva (Bosnia and Herzegovina) Nerman Fatić (Italy) Lorenzo Frigerio (Sweden) Christian Lindell
July 23	Italy F20 Futures; Pontedera, Italy; Clay $25,000+H; Singles and doubles draws	(Argentina) Genaro Alberto Olivieri (Argentina) Camilo Ugo Carabelli; 7–6^{(7–2)}, 6–7^{(7–9)}, [10–3]	(Argentina) Tomás Martín Etcheverry (Argentina) Matías Zukas	(Brazil) José Pereira (Argentina) Genaro Alberto Olivieri	(Brazil) Daniel Dutra da Silva (Bosnia and Herzegovina) Nerman Fatić (Italy) Lorenzo Frigerio (Sweden) Christian Lindell
July 23	Portugal F12 Futures; Porto, Portugal; Clay $25,000; Singles and doubles draws	(Hungary) Máté Valkusz; 6–3, 6–2	(Portugal) Nuno Borges	(Brazil) Orlando Luz (Brazil) Wilson Leite	(France) Samuel Bensoussan (Portugal) Tiago Cação (Germany) Tobias Simon (France) Maxime Chazal
July 23	Portugal F12 Futures; Porto, Portugal; Clay $25,000; Singles and doubles draws	(Brazil) Orlando Luz (Brazil) Felipe Meligeni Alves; 7–5, 3–6, [10–6]	(Portugal) Fred Gil (Austria) David Pichler	(Brazil) Orlando Luz (Brazil) Wilson Leite	(France) Samuel Bensoussan (Portugal) Tiago Cação (Germany) Tobias Simon (France) Maxime Chazal
July 23	Spain F20 Futures; Dénia, Spain; Clay $25,000; Singles and doubles draws	(Spain) Javier Barranco Cosano; 3–6, 6–3, 7–5	(Spain) Jaume Pla Malfeito	(Spain) Pol Toledo Bagué (Spain) Carlos López Montagud	(Spain) Alberto Romero de Ávila Senise (United Kingdom) Billy Harris (Russia) Mikhail Korovin (Poland) Maciej Rajski
July 23	Spain F20 Futures; Dénia, Spain; Clay $25,000; Singles and doubles draws	(Spain) Alberto Barroso Campos (Spain) Eduard Esteve Lobato; 7–6^{(7–5)}, 7–6^{(9–7)}	(Spain) Carlos Sánchez Jover (Spain) Pedro Vives Marcos	(Spain) Pol Toledo Bagué (Spain) Carlos López Montagud	(Spain) Alberto Romero de Ávila Senise (United Kingdom) Billy Harris (Russia) Mikhail Korovin (Poland) Maciej Rajski
July 23	USA F20 Futures; Champaign, United States; Hard $25,000; Singles and doubles draws	(Tunisia) Aziz Dougaz; 7–6^{(7–3)}, 6–4	(Cyprus) Petros Chrysochos	(United States) Alec Adamson (United States) Sebastian Korda	(United Kingdom) Tom Farquharson (Argentina) Santiago Rodríguez Taverna (United States) John McNally (United States) Ezekiel Clark
July 23	USA F20 Futures; Champaign, United States; Hard $25,000; Singles and doubles draws	(France) Maxime Cressy (United States) Martin Joyce; 6–3, 6–2	(United States) Charlie Emhardt (United States) Alfredo Perez	(United States) Alec Adamson (United States) Sebastian Korda	(United Kingdom) Tom Farquharson (Argentina) Santiago Rodríguez Taverna (United States) John McNally (United States) Ezekiel Clark
July 23	Austria F4 Futures; Sankt Pölten, Austria; Clay $15,000; Singles and doubles draws	(Germany) Peter Heller; 7–5, 6–2	(Austria) Thomas Statzberger	(Japan) Yuta Shimizu (Austria) Matthias Haim	(Czech Republic) Filip Duda (Romania) Bogdan Borza (Austria) Alexander Erler (Italy) Stefano Battaglino
July 23	Austria F4 Futures; Sankt Pölten, Austria; Clay $15,000; Singles and doubles draws	(Austria) Matthias Haim (Romania) Călin Manda; 6–4, 3–6, [10–8]	(Germany) Peter Heller (Austria) Thomas Statzberger	(Japan) Yuta Shimizu (Austria) Matthias Haim	(Czech Republic) Filip Duda (Romania) Bogdan Borza (Austria) Alexander Erler (Italy) Stefano Battaglino
July 23	Belgium F5 Futures; Duinbergen, Belgium; Clay $15,000; Singles and doubles draws	(Belgium) Jeroen Vanneste; 7–6^{(7–2)}, 6–3	(Belgium) Zizou Bergs	(Belgium) Jonas Merckx (Italy) Luca Prevosto	(Romania) Teodor Giușcă (Netherlands) Stephan Gerritsen (Belgium) Maxime Pauwels (Chile) Juan Carlos Sáez
July 23	Belgium F5 Futures; Duinbergen, Belgium; Clay $15,000; Singles and doubles draws	(Netherlands) Maikel Borg (Netherlands) Stephan Gerritsen; 5–7, 6–1, [10–8]	(Romania) Alexandru Vasile Manole (Romania) Dan Alexandru Tomescu	(Belgium) Jonas Merckx (Italy) Luca Prevosto	(Romania) Teodor Giușcă (Netherlands) Stephan Gerritsen (Belgium) Maxime Pauwels (Chile) Juan Carlos Sáez
July 23	Georgia F3 Futures; Telavi, Georgia; Clay $15,000; Singles and doubles draws	(Bulgaria) Alexandar Lazarov; 6–3, 6–2	(United States) Maksim Tikhomirov	(Ukraine) Vadim Alekseenko (Romania) Gabi Adrian Boitan	(Russia) Kristian Lozan (Romania) Vasile-Alexandru Ghilea (Georgia (country)) George Tsivadze (Kazakhstan) Roman Khassanov
July 23	Georgia F3 Futures; Telavi, Georgia; Clay $15,000; Singles and doubles draws	(Kazakhstan) Grigoriy Lomakin (Georgia (country)) George Tsivadze; 6–7^{(8–10)}, 7–6^{(7–5)}, [10–8]	(Ukraine) Vladyslav Orlov (Ukraine) Oleg Prihodko	(Ukraine) Vadim Alekseenko (Romania) Gabi Adrian Boitan	(Russia) Kristian Lozan (Romania) Vasile-Alexandru Ghilea (Georgia (country)) George Tsivadze (Kazakhstan) Roman Khassanov
July 23	Germany F9 Futures; Wetzlar, Germany; Clay $15,000; Singles and doubles draws	(Germany) Dominik Böhler; Walkover	(Germany) Christoph Negritu	(Germany) Mats Rosenkranz (France) Manuel Guinard	(Australia) Cameron Green (Switzerland) Raphael Baltensperger (Germany) Henri Squire (Switzerland) Louroi Martinez
July 23	Germany F9 Futures; Wetzlar, Germany; Clay $15,000; Singles and doubles draws	(France) Manuel Guinard (France) François Musitelli; 6–1, 6–3	(Spain) Marco Neubau (Germany) Kai Wehnelt	(Germany) Mats Rosenkranz (France) Manuel Guinard	(Australia) Cameron Green (Switzerland) Raphael Baltensperger (Germany) Henri Squire (Switzerland) Louroi Martinez
July 23	Indonesia F1 Futures; Jakarta, Indonesia; Hard $15,000; Singles and doubles draws	(Réunion) Quentin Robert; 5–7, 7–5, 6–3	(Australia) Michael Look	(Australia) Jeremy Beale (Japan) Kaito Uesugi	(South Korea) Kim Cheong-eui (India) Aryan Goveas (United Kingdom) Isaac Stoute (Lebanon) Hady Habib
July 23	Indonesia F1 Futures; Jakarta, Indonesia; Hard $15,000; Singles and doubles draws	(Australia) Michael Look (Australia) Matthew Romios; 7–6^{(8–6)}, 7–6^{(7–5)}	(Indonesia) Justin Barki (Indonesia) Christopher Rungkat	(Australia) Jeremy Beale (Japan) Kaito Uesugi	(South Korea) Kim Cheong-eui (India) Aryan Goveas (United Kingdom) Isaac Stoute (Lebanon) Hady Habib
July 23	Lithuania F1 Futures; Vilnius, Lithuania; Clay $15,000; Singles and doubles draws	(United Kingdom) Paul Jubb; 6–4, 6–2	(Russia) Denis Klok	(Latvia) Mārtiņš Podžus (Italy) Julian Ocleppo	(Sweden) Christoffer Solberg (United Kingdom) Samm Butler (Lithuania) Robertas Vrzesinski (Netherlands) Bart Stevens
July 23	Lithuania F1 Futures; Vilnius, Lithuania; Clay $15,000; Singles and doubles draws	(Brazil) Matheus Pucinelli de Almeida (Brazil) João Lucas Reis da Silva; 6–2, 6–2	(Netherlands) Marc Dijkhuizen (Netherlands) Bart Stevens	(Latvia) Mārtiņš Podžus (Italy) Julian Ocleppo	(Sweden) Christoffer Solberg (United Kingdom) Samm Butler (Lithuania) Robertas Vrzesinski (Netherlands) Bart Stevens
July 23	Morocco F2 Futures; Meknes, Morocco; Clay $15,000; Singles and doubles draws	(France) Arthur Rinderknech; 4–6, 7–5, 6–3	(Morocco) Lamine Ouahab	(Argentina) Franco Emanuel Egea (Peru) Mauricio Echazú	(Russia) Alexander Zhurbin (Croatia) Neven Krivokuća (Tunisia) Aziz Ouakaa (Argentina) Federico Moreno
July 23	Morocco F2 Futures; Meknes, Morocco; Clay $15,000; Singles and doubles draws	(Argentina) Franco Emanuel Egea (Argentina) Federico Moreno; 6–3, 6–3	(Argentina) Ignacio Monzón (Argentina) Juan Bautista Otegui	(Argentina) Franco Emanuel Egea (Peru) Mauricio Echazú	(Russia) Alexander Zhurbin (Croatia) Neven Krivokuća (Tunisia) Aziz Ouakaa (Argentina) Federico Moreno
July 23	Slovakia F1 Futures; Trnava, Slovakia; Clay $15,000; Singles and doubles draws	(Slovakia) Alex Molčan; 7–6^{(7–5)}, 6–3	(Czech Republic) Tomáš Jiroušek	(Japan) Rio Noguchi (Ukraine) Danylo Kalenichenko	(Slovakia) Ivan Košec (Slovakia) Martin Fekiač (Czech Republic) Petr Michnev (Czech Republic) Tadeáš Paroulek
July 23	Slovakia F1 Futures; Trnava, Slovakia; Clay $15,000; Singles and doubles draws	(Czech Republic) Petr Michnev (Czech Republic) Tadeáš Paroulek; 7–6^{(7–1)}, 6–7^{(8–10)}, [10–7]	(United States) Matthew Kandath (Hungary) Fábián Marozsán	(Japan) Rio Noguchi (Ukraine) Danylo Kalenichenko	(Slovakia) Ivan Košec (Slovakia) Martin Fekiač (Czech Republic) Petr Michnev (Czech Republic) Tadeáš Paroulek
July 30	Ecuador F2 Futures; Portoviejo, Ecuador; Clay $25,000; Singles and doubles draws	(Ecuador) Emilio Gómez; 4–6, 7–5, 6–4	(Brazil) Oscar José Gutierrez	(Portugal) Bernardo Saraiva (United States) Jordi Arconada	(Argentina) Facundo Juárez (Argentina) Mateo Nicolás Martínez (Spain) José Francisco Vidal Azorin (Ecuador) Antonio Cayetano March
July 30	Ecuador F2 Futures; Portoviejo, Ecuador; Clay $25,000; Singles and doubles draws	(United States) Jordi Arconada (Ecuador) Emilio Gómez; 6–4, 6–3	(Colombia) Juan Sebastián Gómez (Brazil) Diego Matos	(Portugal) Bernardo Saraiva (United States) Jordi Arconada	(Argentina) Facundo Juárez (Argentina) Mateo Nicolás Martínez (Spain) José Francisco Vidal Azorin (Ecuador) Antonio Cayetano March
July 30	Germany F10 Futures; Essen, Germany; Clay $25,000; Singles and doubles draws	(Germany) Louis Wessels; 7–6^{(8–6)}, 6–4	(Belgium) Jeroen Vanneste	(Germany) Peter Torebko (France) Manuel Guinard	(France) Axel Michon (Netherlands) Botic van de Zandschulp (France) Maxime Tchoutakian (France) Evan Furness
July 30	Germany F10 Futures; Essen, Germany; Clay $25,000; Singles and doubles draws	(Germany) Louis Wessels (Germany) Matthias Wunner; 6–2, 6–2	(Germany) Lukas Rüpke (Germany) Tom Schönenberg	(Germany) Peter Torebko (France) Manuel Guinard	(France) Axel Michon (Netherlands) Botic van de Zandschulp (France) Maxime Tchoutakian (France) Evan Furness
July 30	Ireland F1 Futures; Dublin, Ireland; Carpet $25,000; Singles and doubles draws	(Republic of Ireland) Peter Bothwell; 5–7, 6–3, 6–3	(United Kingdom) Ryan James Storrie	(United Kingdom) Joshua Paris (Germany) Stefan Seifert	(United States) Conor Berg (France) Hugo Voljacques (Romania) George Botezan (United Kingdom) Jonathan Binding
July 30	Ireland F1 Futures; Dublin, Ireland; Carpet $25,000; Singles and doubles draws	(United Kingdom) Luke Johnson (France) Hugo Voljacques; 7–6^{(8–6)}, 6–4	(United Kingdom) Ben Jones (United Kingdom) Joshua Paris	(United Kingdom) Joshua Paris (Germany) Stefan Seifert	(United States) Conor Berg (France) Hugo Voljacques (Romania) George Botezan (United Kingdom) Jonathan Binding
July 30	Italy F21 Futures; Bolzano, Italy; Clay $25,000; Singles and doubles draws	(Brazil) João Souza; 7–6^{(7–3)}, 6–4	(Argentina) Tomás Martín Etcheverry	(Argentina) Gonzalo Villanueva (Germany) Tobias Simon	(Italy) Lorenzo Frigerio (Ecuador) Gonzalo Escobar (Brazil) João Pedro Sorgi (Italy) Riccardo Balzerani
July 30	Italy F21 Futures; Bolzano, Italy; Clay $25,000; Singles and doubles draws	(Argentina) Hernán Casanova (Ecuador) Gonzalo Escobar; 7–5, 6–2	(Brazil) Wilson Leite (Brazil) Bruno Sant'Anna	(Argentina) Gonzalo Villanueva (Germany) Tobias Simon	(Italy) Lorenzo Frigerio (Ecuador) Gonzalo Escobar (Brazil) João Pedro Sorgi (Italy) Riccardo Balzerani
July 30	USA F21 Futures; Decatur, United States; Hard $25,000; Singles and doubles draws	(Peru) Nicolás Álvarez; 6–4, 3–6, 6–3	(United States) Sebastian Korda	(Argentina) Axel Geller (United States) Jacob Dunbar	(United Kingdom) Finn Bass (United States) Alexios Halebian (United States) Grey Hamilton (United States) Aron Hiltzik
July 30	USA F21 Futures; Decatur, United States; Hard $25,000; Singles and doubles draws	(France) Maxime Cressy (United States) Martin Joyce; 4–6, 6–2, [10–2]	(United States) Nicolas Meister (United States) Keegan Smith	(Argentina) Axel Geller (United States) Jacob Dunbar	(United Kingdom) Finn Bass (United States) Alexios Halebian (United States) Grey Hamilton (United States) Aron Hiltzik
July 30	Austria F5 Futures; Vogau, Austria; Clay $15,000; Singles and doubles draws	(Argentina) Matías Zukas; 6–3, 6–3	(Japan) Takuto Niki	(Austria) Jonas Trinker (Japan) Yuta Shimizu	(Slovenia) Mike Urbanija (North Macedonia) Tomislav Jotovski (Czech Republic) Yvo Panák (Bulgaria) Alexandar Lazarov
July 30	Austria F5 Futures; Vogau, Austria; Clay $15,000; Singles and doubles draws	(Argentina) Alejo Vilaro (Argentina) Matías Zukas; 6–3, 3–6, [10–4]	(Japan) Takuto Niki (Japan) Yuta Shimizu	(Austria) Jonas Trinker (Japan) Yuta Shimizu	(Slovenia) Mike Urbanija (North Macedonia) Tomislav Jotovski (Czech Republic) Yvo Panák (Bulgaria) Alexandar Lazarov
July 30	Belgium F6 Futures; Brussels, Belgium; Clay $15,000; Singles and doubles draws	(France) Jules Marie; 7–5, 7–6^{(7–3)}	(France) Maxime Chazal	(Northern Mariana Islands) Colin Sinclair (Italy) Stefano Baldoni	(Belgium) Loïc Cloes (Luxembourg) Alex Knaff (Germany) Dominik Böhler (Peru) Arklon Huertas del Pino
July 30	Belgium F6 Futures; Brussels, Belgium; Clay $15,000; Singles and doubles draws	(Peru) Alexander Merino (Germany) Christoph Negritu; 7–6^{(7–2)}, 6–4	(France) Joffrey de Schepper (Benin) Alexis Klégou	(Northern Mariana Islands) Colin Sinclair (Italy) Stefano Baldoni	(Belgium) Loïc Cloes (Luxembourg) Alex Knaff (Germany) Dominik Böhler (Peru) Arklon Huertas del Pino
July 30	Finland F1 Futures; Kaarina, Finland; Clay $15,000; Singles and doubles draws	(Sweden) Gustav Hansson; 7–6^{(7–5)}, 6–0	(Finland) Patrik Niklas-Salminen	(France) Laurent Rochette (Estonia) Vladimir Ivanov	(United Kingdom) George Loffhagen (Italy) Ettore Capello (Brazil) Eduardo Dischinger (Estonia) Mattias Siimar
July 30	Finland F1 Futures; Kaarina, Finland; Clay $15,000; Singles and doubles draws	(Netherlands) Marc Dijkhuizen (Netherlands) Bart Stevens; 6–2, 3–6, [10–2]	(Brazil) Eduardo Dischinger (Netherlands) Mats Hermans	(France) Laurent Rochette (Estonia) Vladimir Ivanov	(United Kingdom) George Loffhagen (Italy) Ettore Capello (Brazil) Eduardo Dischinger (Estonia) Mattias Siimar
July 30	Indonesia F2 Futures; Jakarta, Indonesia; Hard $15,000; Singles and doubles draws	(Australia) Jeremy Beale; 6–2, 6–2	(Japan) Kaito Uesugi	(United States) Christian Langmo (Australia) Edward Bourchier	(South Korea) Kim Cheong-eui (Lebanon) Hady Habib (India) Aryan Goveas (France) Gabriel Petit
July 30	Indonesia F2 Futures; Jakarta, Indonesia; Hard $15,000; Singles and doubles draws	(Japan) Sho Shimabukuro (Japan) Kaito Uesugi; 6–3, 7–6^{(7–4)}	(South Korea) Kim Cheong-eui (Indonesia) David Agung Susanto	(United States) Christian Langmo (Australia) Edward Bourchier	(South Korea) Kim Cheong-eui (Lebanon) Hady Habib (India) Aryan Goveas (France) Gabriel Petit
July 30	Latvia F1 Futures; Riga, Lithuania; Clay $15,000; Singles and doubles draws	(Russia) Ronald Slobodichkov; 6–2, 6–0	(Russia) Denis Klok	(Argentina) Guido Iván Justo (Brazil) Fernando Yamacita	(Latvia) Roberts Grīnvalds (Russia) Bogdan Bobrov (Russia) Matvey Minin (Lithuania) Robertas Vrzesinski
July 30	Latvia F1 Futures; Riga, Lithuania; Clay $15,000; Singles and doubles draws	(Lithuania) Tadas Babelis (Lithuania) Kasparas Žemaitėlis; 6–4, 3–6, [10–1]	(Latvia) Roberts Grīnvalds (Latvia) Rūdolfs Mednis	(Argentina) Guido Iván Justo (Brazil) Fernando Yamacita	(Latvia) Roberts Grīnvalds (Russia) Bogdan Bobrov (Russia) Matvey Minin (Lithuania) Robertas Vrzesinski
July 30	Morocco F3 Futures; Tangier, Morocco; Clay $15,000; Singles and doubles draws	(Morocco) Lamine Ouahab; 6–4, 6–2	(Argentina) Franco Capalbo	(Peru) Mauricio Echazú (Argentina) Franco Emanuel Egea	(Italy) Alessandro Ingarao (United States) Justin Butsch (Switzerland) Adam Moundir (France) Matthieu Perchicot
July 30	Morocco F3 Futures; Tangier, Morocco; Clay $15,000; Singles and doubles draws	(Argentina) Manuel Barros (Argentina) Tomás Lipovšek Puches; 6–3, 6–1	(Switzerland) Adam Moundir (Morocco) Lamine Ouahab	(Peru) Mauricio Echazú (Argentina) Franco Emanuel Egea	(Italy) Alessandro Ingarao (United States) Justin Butsch (Switzerland) Adam Moundir (France) Matthieu Perchicot
July 30	Portugal F13 Futures; Caldas da Rainha, Portugal; Clay $15,000; Singles and doubles draws	(Portugal) Nuno Borges; 6–0, 6–2	(Portugal) Daniel Batista	(Portugal) Guilherme Osório (Italy) Julian Ocleppo	(Spain) Hugo Largo (Chile) Michel Vernier (France) François-Arthur Vibert (France) Samuel Bensoussan
July 30	Portugal F13 Futures; Caldas da Rainha, Portugal; Clay $15,000; Singles and doubles draws	(Portugal) Tiago Cação (Portugal) Guilherme Osório; 6–3, 6–4	(France) Samuel Bensoussan (France) Jérôme Inzerillo	(Portugal) Guilherme Osório (Italy) Julian Ocleppo	(Spain) Hugo Largo (Chile) Michel Vernier (France) François-Arthur Vibert (France) Samuel Bensoussan
July 30	Russia F4 Futures; Kazan, Russia; Clay $15,000; Singles and doubles draws	(Russia) Richard Muzaev; 7–5, 1–6, 6–3	(Russia) Anton Zaitcev	(Russia) Kristian Lozan (Russia) Mikhail Fufygin	(Russia) Alexander Igoshin (Russia) Maxim Ratniuk (Kazakhstan) Roman Khassanov (Russia) Dimitriy Voronin
July 30	Russia F4 Futures; Kazan, Russia; Clay $15,000; Singles and doubles draws	(Russia) Alexander Boborykin (Russia) Timur Kiyamov; 6–7^{(5–7)}, 6–1, [10–5]	(Russia) Mikhail Fufygin (Russia) Denis Matsukevich	(Russia) Kristian Lozan (Russia) Mikhail Fufygin	(Russia) Alexander Igoshin (Russia) Maxim Ratniuk (Kazakhstan) Roman Khassanov (Russia) Dimitriy Voronin
July 30	Slovakia F2 Futures; Piešťany, Slovakia; Clay $15,000; Singles and doubles draws	(Slovakia) Alex Molčan; 6–3, 6–2	(United Kingdom) Ewan Moore	(United Kingdom) Paul Jubb (Ukraine) Danylo Kalenichenko	(Czech Republic) Petr Hájek (Russia) Alexander Shevchenko (Italy) Antonio Massara (Czech Republic) Tadeáš Paroulek
July 30	Slovakia F2 Futures; Piešťany, Slovakia; Clay $15,000; Singles and doubles draws	(Czech Republic) Petr Hájek (Slovakia) Marek Semjan; 6–4, 6–4	(Czech Republic) Petr Nouza (Czech Republic) David Škoch	(United Kingdom) Paul Jubb (Ukraine) Danylo Kalenichenko	(Czech Republic) Petr Hájek (Russia) Alexander Shevchenko (Italy) Antonio Massara (Czech Republic) Tadeáš Paroulek
July 30	Spain F21 Futures; Xàtiva, Spain; Clay $15,000; Singles and doubles draws	(Spain) Oriol Roca Batalla; 6–2, 7–6^{(7–2)}	(Spain) Eduard Esteve Lobato	(Spain) Jaume Pla Malfeito (Spain) Marc Giner	(Russia) Andrey Chepelev (Spain) Imanol López Morillo (Argentina) Nicolás Alberto Arreche (Russia) Mikhail Korovin
July 30	Spain F21 Futures; Xàtiva, Spain; Clay $15,000; Singles and doubles draws	(Spain) Sergio Barranco (Spain) Oriol Roca Batalla; 6–3, 0–6, [11–9]	(Spain) Marc Giner (Spain) Jaume Pla Malfeito	(Spain) Jaume Pla Malfeito (Spain) Marc Giner	(Russia) Andrey Chepelev (Spain) Imanol López Morillo (Argentina) Nicolás Alberto Arreche (Russia) Mikhail Korovin

=== August ===
Week of	Tournament	Winner	Runners-up	Semifinalists	Quarterfinalists
August 6	Indonesia F3 Futures; Jakarta, Indonesia; Hard $25,000; Singles and doubles draws	(India) Niki Kaliyanda Poonacha; 6–3, 6–1	(Australia) Michael Look	(Australia) Daniel Nolan (Australia) Jeremy Beale	(India) Nitin Kumar Sinha (Indonesia) David Agung Susanto (India) Karunuday Singh (New Zealand) Ajeet Rai
August 6	Indonesia F3 Futures; Jakarta, Indonesia; Hard $25,000; Singles and doubles draws	(Indonesia) Justin Barki (Indonesia) Christopher Rungkat; 6–3, 6–2	(Philippines) Francis Alcantara (Japan) Kaito Uesugi	(Australia) Daniel Nolan (Australia) Jeremy Beale	(India) Nitin Kumar Sinha (Indonesia) David Agung Susanto (India) Karunuday Singh (New Zealand) Ajeet Rai
August 6	Italy F22 Futures; Cornaiano, Italy; Clay $25,000+H; Singles and doubles draws	(Italy) Pietro Rondoni; 6–3, 3–6, 6–0	(France) Fabien Reboul	(Argentina) Juan Pablo Ficovich (Brazil) João Souza	(Argentina) Gonzalo Villanueva (Brazil) João Pedro Sorgi (Italy) Davide Galoppini (Germany) Elmar Ejupovic
August 6	Italy F22 Futures; Cornaiano, Italy; Clay $25,000+H; Singles and doubles draws	(Italy) Marco Bortolotti (Italy) Alexander Weis; 6–2, 4–6, [10–8]	(Italy) Andrea Guerrieri (Italy) Corrado Summaria	(Argentina) Juan Pablo Ficovich (Brazil) João Souza	(Argentina) Gonzalo Villanueva (Brazil) João Pedro Sorgi (Italy) Davide Galoppini (Germany) Elmar Ejupovic
August 6	USA F22 Futures; Edwardsville, United States; Hard $25,000; Singles and doubles draws	(Argentina) Axel Geller; 6–2, 4–6, 7–6^{(7–0)}	(United States) Sebastian Korda	(Peru) Nicolás Álvarez (France) Maxime Cressy	(United States) Ryan Shane (United States) Paul Oosterbaan (France) Sébastien Boltz (United States) Alfredo Perez
August 6	USA F22 Futures; Edwardsville, United States; Hard $25,000; Singles and doubles draws	(Peru) Nicolás Álvarez (Italy) Liam Caruana; 6–7^{(6–8)}, 7–6^{(7–3)}, [10–7]	(United States) Nicolas Meister (United States) Evan Zhu	(Peru) Nicolás Álvarez (France) Maxime Cressy	(United States) Ryan Shane (United States) Paul Oosterbaan (France) Sébastien Boltz (United States) Alfredo Perez
August 6	Austria F6 Futures; Innsbruck, Austria; Clay $15,000; Singles and doubles draws	(Italy) Alessandro Petrone; 2–6, 6–1, 6–4	(Japan) Yuta Shimizu	(Argentina) Mariano Kestelboim (Austria) Alexander Erler	(Austria) Gabriel Schmidt (Netherlands) Mick Veldheer (Italy) Omar Giacalone (Austria) Jonas Trinker
August 6	Austria F6 Futures; Innsbruck, Austria; Clay $15,000; Singles and doubles draws	(Austria) Jakob Aichhorn (Austria) Alexander Erler; 6–1, 1–6, [11–9]	(Argentina) Mariano Kestelboim (Argentina) Alejo Vilaro	(Argentina) Mariano Kestelboim (Austria) Alexander Erler	(Austria) Gabriel Schmidt (Netherlands) Mick Veldheer (Italy) Omar Giacalone (Austria) Jonas Trinker
August 6	Belarus F1 Futures; Minsk, Belarus; Hard $15,000; Singles and doubles draws	(Uzbekistan) Jurabek Karimov; 6–4, 6–4	(United Kingdom) Jonathan Gray	(Israel) Igor Smilansky (Belarus) Sergey Betov	(Belarus) Ivan Liutarevich (Georgia (country)) George Tsivadze (Turkey) Anıl Yüksel (Kazakhstan) Roman Khassanov
August 6	Belarus F1 Futures; Minsk, Belarus; Hard $15,000; Singles and doubles draws	(Israel) Igor Smilansky (Brazil) Fernando Yamacita; 6–3, 6–0	(Belarus) Sergey Betov (Belarus) Ivan Liutarevich	(Israel) Igor Smilansky (Belarus) Sergey Betov	(Belarus) Ivan Liutarevich (Georgia (country)) George Tsivadze (Turkey) Anıl Yüksel (Kazakhstan) Roman Khassanov
August 6	Belgium F7 Futures; Eupen, Belgium; Clay $15,000; Singles and doubles draws	(Argentina) Tomás Martín Etcheverry; 6–3, 6–3	(Belgium) Jeroen Vanneste	(Belgium) Arnaud Bovy (Netherlands) Sidané Pontjodikromo	(France) Constantin Bittoun Kouzmine (France) Benjamin Pietri (Argentina) Matías Zukas (Italy) Stefano Baldoni
August 6	Belgium F7 Futures; Eupen, Belgium; Clay $15,000; Singles and doubles draws	(Netherlands) Maikel Borg (Netherlands) Stephan Gerritsen; 6–2, 4–6, [10–6]	(Netherlands) Glenn Smits (Netherlands) Boy Vergeer	(Belgium) Arnaud Bovy (Netherlands) Sidané Pontjodikromo	(France) Constantin Bittoun Kouzmine (France) Benjamin Pietri (Argentina) Matías Zukas (Italy) Stefano Baldoni
August 6	Finland F2 Futures; Hyvinkää, Finland; Clay $15,000; Singles and doubles draws	(Sweden) Gustav Hansson; 6–2, 6–3	(France) Laurent Rochette	(Finland) Patrik Niklas-Salminen (Czech Republic) Michal Konečný	(Sweden) Karl Friberg (United Kingdom) George Loffhagen (Sweden) Jonathan Mridha (Germany) Lukas Ollert
August 6	Finland F2 Futures; Hyvinkää, Finland; Clay $15,000; Singles and doubles draws	(Finland) Patrick Kaukovalta (Finland) Eero Vasa; 6–4, 6–3	(Finland) Sami Huurinainen (Finland) Masi Sarpola	(Finland) Patrik Niklas-Salminen (Czech Republic) Michal Konečný	(Sweden) Karl Friberg (United Kingdom) George Loffhagen (Sweden) Jonathan Mridha (Germany) Lukas Ollert
August 6	Germany F11 Futures; Trier, Germany; Clay $15,000; Singles and doubles draws	(Germany) Jan Choinski; 6–4, 3–6, 6–3	(Germany) Benjamin Hassan	(Germany) Christoph Negritu (France) Evan Furness	(Germany) Constantin Schmitz (Germany) Mats Rosenkranz (Germany) Paul Wörner (Germany) Kevin Kaczynski
August 6	Germany F11 Futures; Trier, Germany; Clay $15,000; Singles and doubles draws	(Germany) Benjamin Hassan (Germany) Constantin Schmitz; 7–6^{(7–3)}, 4–6, [12–10]	(Peru) Alexander Merino (Germany) Christoph Negritu	(Germany) Christoph Negritu (France) Evan Furness	(Germany) Constantin Schmitz (Germany) Mats Rosenkranz (Germany) Paul Wörner (Germany) Kevin Kaczynski
August 6	Morocco F4 Futures; Casablanca, Morocco; Clay $15,000; Singles and doubles draws	(France) Matthieu Perchicot; 7–6^{(7–1)}, 6–3	(Argentina) Juan Bautista Otegui	(Morocco) Anas Fattar (Argentina) Franco Emanuel Egea	(France) Alexis Musialek (Italy) Andrea Bessire (Peru) Mauricio Echazú (Argentina) Ignacio Monzón
August 6	Morocco F4 Futures; Casablanca, Morocco; Clay $15,000; Singles and doubles draws	(Argentina) Franco Emanuel Egea (Argentina) Federico Moreno; 6–4, 6–4	(France) Alexis Musialek (France) Louis Tessa	(Morocco) Anas Fattar (Argentina) Franco Emanuel Egea	(France) Alexis Musialek (Italy) Andrea Bessire (Peru) Mauricio Echazú (Argentina) Ignacio Monzón
August 6	Poland F6 Futures; Koszalin, Poland; Clay $15,000; Singles and doubles draws	(Poland) Szymon Walków; 4–6, 7–5, 6–1	(Poland) Maciej Rajski	(Poland) Jan Zieliński (Argentina) Matías Franco Descotte	(Poland) Paweł Ciaś (Ukraine) Vladyslav Orlov (United States) Tyler Mercier (Poland) Kacper Żuk
August 6	Poland F6 Futures; Koszalin, Poland; Clay $15,000; Singles and doubles draws	(Poland) Jan Zieliński (Poland) Kacper Żuk; 6–2, 6–2	(Poland) Paweł Ciaś (Poland) Michał Dembek	(Poland) Jan Zieliński (Argentina) Matías Franco Descotte	(Poland) Paweł Ciaś (Ukraine) Vladyslav Orlov (United States) Tyler Mercier (Poland) Kacper Żuk
August 6	Portugal F14 Futures; Sintra, Portugal; Hard $15,000; Singles and doubles draws	(Portugal) Frederico Ferreira Silva; 6–3, 6–1	(Portugal) Tiago Cação	(Portugal) Fred Gil (Portugal) João Monteiro	(France) Yannick Jankovits (India) Terence Das (Portugal) Gonçalo Falcão (Brazil) Pedro Gabriel Rodrigues
August 6	Portugal F14 Futures; Sintra, Portugal; Hard $15,000; Singles and doubles draws	(Portugal) Tiago Cação (Portugal) Guilherme Osório; 4–6, 6–4, [10–6]	(Portugal) Gonçalo Falcão (Brazil) Diego Matos	(Portugal) Fred Gil (Portugal) João Monteiro	(France) Yannick Jankovits (India) Terence Das (Portugal) Gonçalo Falcão (Brazil) Pedro Gabriel Rodrigues
August 6	Romania F8 Futures; Bucharest, Romania; Clay $15,000; Singles and doubles draws	(Romania) Dragoș Dima; 6–2, 7–5	(Romania) Bogdan Ionuț Apostol	(Italy) Roberto Marcora (France) Maxime Tchoutakian	(Romania) Andrei Ștefan Apostol (Romania) Petru-Alexandru Luncanu (Romania) Gabi Adrian Boitan (Spain) Miguel Semmler
August 6	Romania F8 Futures; Bucharest, Romania; Clay $15,000; Singles and doubles draws	(Romania) Victor Vlad Cornea (Romania) Petru-Alexandru Luncanu; 6–2, 6–2	(Romania) Alexandru Vasile Manole (Romania) Dan Alexandru Tomescu	(Italy) Roberto Marcora (France) Maxime Tchoutakian	(Romania) Andrei Ștefan Apostol (Romania) Petru-Alexandru Luncanu (Romania) Gabi Adrian Boitan (Spain) Miguel Semmler
August 6	Russia F5 Futures; Kazan, Russia; Clay $15,000; Singles and doubles draws	(Russia) Alexander Zhurbin; 6–2, 6–2	(Russia) Kristian Lozan	(Russia) Alexey Zakharov (Belarus) Mikalai Haliak	(Russia) Maxim Ratniuk (Russia) Alexander Igoshin (Russia) Mikhail Fufygin (Russia) Evgenii Tiurnev
August 6	Russia F5 Futures; Kazan, Russia; Clay $15,000; Singles and doubles draws	(Russia) Sergey Bolotov (Russia) Ivan Mikhaylyuk; 6–2, 6–4	(Kazakhstan) Sagadat Ayap (Ukraine) Oleg Khotkov	(Russia) Alexey Zakharov (Belarus) Mikalai Haliak	(Russia) Maxim Ratniuk (Russia) Alexander Igoshin (Russia) Mikhail Fufygin (Russia) Evgenii Tiurnev
August 6	Serbia F1 Futures; Novi Sad, Serbia; Clay $15,000; Singles and doubles draws	(Serbia) Miljan Zekić; 6–2, 6–4	(Italy) Simone Roncalli	(France) Florent Diep (Turkey) Ergi Kırkın	(Serbia) Marko Miladinović (France) Nicolas Rosenzweig (North Macedonia) Tomislav Jotovski (Hungary) Péter Nagy
August 6	Serbia F1 Futures; Novi Sad, Serbia; Clay $15,000; Singles and doubles draws	(Serbia) Dejan Katić (Serbia) Goran Marković; Walkover	(France) Florent Diep (Hungary) Péter Nagy	(France) Florent Diep (Turkey) Ergi Kırkın	(Serbia) Marko Miladinović (France) Nicolas Rosenzweig (North Macedonia) Tomislav Jotovski (Hungary) Péter Nagy
August 6	Slovakia F3 Futures; Bratislava, Slovakia; Clay $15,000; Singles and doubles draws	(Slovakia) Alex Molčan; 6–4, 6–3	(Czech Republic) Petr Nouza	(United Kingdom) Jack Draper (United Kingdom) Paul Jubb	(Slovakia) Michal Selecký (Ukraine) Danylo Kalenichenko (Japan) Rio Noguchi (United Kingdom) Samm Butler
August 6	Slovakia F3 Futures; Bratislava, Slovakia; Clay $15,000; Singles and doubles draws	(Ukraine) Danylo Kalenichenko (Slovakia) Filip Polášek; 6–3, 6–2	(Czech Republic) Petr Michnev (Czech Republic) Antonín Štěpánek	(United Kingdom) Jack Draper (United Kingdom) Paul Jubb	(Slovakia) Michal Selecký (Ukraine) Danylo Kalenichenko (Japan) Rio Noguchi (United Kingdom) Samm Butler
August 6	Spain F22 Futures; Pozoblanco, Spain; Hard $15,000; Singles and doubles draws	(France) Mick Lescure; 7–6^{(8–6)}, 6–2	(Spain) David Pérez Sanz	(Spain) Oriol Roca Batalla (Spain) Andrés Artuñedo	(United States) Samuel Shropshire (United Kingdom) Evan Hoyt (Bolivia) Federico Zeballos (Ecuador) Diego Hidalgo
August 6	Spain F22 Futures; Pozoblanco, Spain; Hard $15,000; Singles and doubles draws	(Spain) Andrés Artuñedo (France) Mick Lescure; 6–7^{(3–7)}, 6–4, [10–6]	(United Kingdom) Evan Hoyt (Serbia) Darko Jandrić	(Spain) Oriol Roca Batalla (Spain) Andrés Artuñedo	(United States) Samuel Shropshire (United Kingdom) Evan Hoyt (Bolivia) Federico Zeballos (Ecuador) Diego Hidalgo
August 13	Poland F7 Futures; Bydgoszcz, Poland; Clay $25,000; Singles and doubles draws	(Germany) Jeremy Jahn; 6–3, 6–4	(Brazil) Pedro Sakamoto	(Brazil) Thiago Seyboth Wild (Slovakia) Lukáš Klein	(Belgium) Christopher Heyman (Sweden) Christian Lindell (Poland) Paweł Ciaś (Brazil) João Pedro Sorgi
August 13	Poland F7 Futures; Bydgoszcz, Poland; Clay $25,000; Singles and doubles draws	(Poland) Karol Drzewiecki (Poland) Mateusz Kowalczyk; 7–6^{(7–3)}, 6–4	(Poland) Michał Mikuła (Poland) Yann Wójcik	(Brazil) Thiago Seyboth Wild (Slovakia) Lukáš Klein	(Belgium) Christopher Heyman (Sweden) Christian Lindell (Poland) Paweł Ciaś (Brazil) João Pedro Sorgi
August 13	Romania F9 Futures; Pitești, Romania; Clay $25,000; Singles and doubles draws	(Argentina) Federico Coria; 7–5, 6–2	(Colombia) Cristian Rodríguez	(Bulgaria) Alexandar Lazarov (France) Samuel Bensoussan	(Romania) Dragoș Dima (Romania) Călin Manda (Romania) Alexandru Vasile Manole (Brazil) Wilson Leite
August 13	Romania F9 Futures; Pitești, Romania; Clay $25,000; Singles and doubles draws	(Romania) Bogdan Ionuț Apostol (Romania) Luca George Tatomir; 2–6, 6–3, [10–8]	(Romania) Andrei Ștefan Apostol (Romania) Nicolae Frunză	(Bulgaria) Alexandar Lazarov (France) Samuel Bensoussan	(Romania) Dragoș Dima (Romania) Călin Manda (Romania) Alexandru Vasile Manole (Brazil) Wilson Leite
August 13	USA F23 Futures; Boston, United States; Hard $25,000; Singles and doubles draws	(United States) Sekou Bangoura; 7–5, 6–2	(France) Antoine Hoang	(Colombia) Alejandro Gómez (Australia) Andrew Harris	(Peru) Nicolás Álvarez (United States) Evan Zhu (United States) Strong Kirchheimer (United States) Vasil Kirkov
August 13	USA F23 Futures; Boston, United States; Hard $25,000; Singles and doubles draws	(United States) Martin Redlicki (United States) Evan Zhu; 7–5, 6–7^{(13–15)}, [10–1]	(United States) Felix Corwin (United States) Paul Oosterbaan	(Colombia) Alejandro Gómez (Australia) Andrew Harris	(Peru) Nicolás Álvarez (United States) Evan Zhu (United States) Strong Kirchheimer (United States) Vasil Kirkov
August 13	Belarus F2 Futures; Minsk, Belarus; Hard $15,000; Singles and doubles draws	(Belarus) Sergey Betov; 7–5, 1–6, 6–0	(Czech Republic) David Poljak	(Belarus) Ivan Liutarevich (Turkey) Anıl Yüksel	(Israel) Yannai Barkai (Belarus) Aliaksandr Bulitski (Italy) Giorgio Ricca (Czech Republic) Marek Gengel
August 13	Belarus F2 Futures; Minsk, Belarus; Hard $15,000; Singles and doubles draws	(United States) Conor Berg (United Kingdom) Scott Duncan; 7–6^{(7–1)}, 6–4	(Czech Republic) Marek Gengel (Czech Republic) David Poljak	(Belarus) Ivan Liutarevich (Turkey) Anıl Yüksel	(Israel) Yannai Barkai (Belarus) Aliaksandr Bulitski (Italy) Giorgio Ricca (Czech Republic) Marek Gengel
August 13	Belgium F8 Futures; Koksijde, Belgium; Clay $15,000; Singles and doubles draws	(Belgium) Romain Barbosa; 4–6, 6–4, 7–6^{(8–6)}	(Argentina) Matías Zukas	(Belgium) Martin van der Meerschen (Belgium) Benjamin D'Hoe	(Belgium) Simon Beaupain (Belgium) Germain Gigounon (France) Evan Furness (Belgium) Michael Geerts
August 13	Belgium F8 Futures; Koksijde, Belgium; Clay $15,000; Singles and doubles draws	(Belgium) Michael Geerts (Argentina) Matías Zukas; 6–1, 6–1	(Belgium) Niels Desein (Belgium) Germain Gigounon	(Belgium) Martin van der Meerschen (Belgium) Benjamin D'Hoe	(Belgium) Simon Beaupain (Belgium) Germain Gigounon (France) Evan Furness (Belgium) Michael Geerts
August 13	China F12 Futures; Anning, China; Clay $15,000; Singles and doubles draws	(New Zealand) Rhett Purcell; 7–6^{(7–4)}, 6–2	(China) Zheng Weiqiang	(Australia) Jeremy Beale (China) Wang Aoran	(India) Anirudh Chandrasekar (Chinese Taipei) Meng Cing-yang (Japan) Yuichiro Inui (Japan) Naoki Takeda
August 13	China F12 Futures; Anning, China; Clay $15,000; Singles and doubles draws	(China) Wang Aoran (China) Wu Hao; 7–6^{(7–4)}, 3–6, [12–10]	(Australia) Jeremy Beale (New Zealand) Rhett Purcell	(Australia) Jeremy Beale (China) Wang Aoran	(India) Anirudh Chandrasekar (Chinese Taipei) Meng Cing-yang (Japan) Yuichiro Inui (Japan) Naoki Takeda
August 13	Finland F3 Futures; Helsinki, Finland; Clay $15,000; Singles and doubles draws	(Sweden) Karl Friberg; 6–4, 6–1	(Finland) Otto Virtanen	(Italy) Lorenzo Bocchi (France) Alexis Gautier	(Estonia) Karl Kiur Saar (Republic of Ireland) Simon Carr (Germany) Patrick Mayer (Finland) Patrik Niklas-Salminen
August 13	Finland F3 Futures; Helsinki, Finland; Clay $15,000; Singles and doubles draws	(Finland) Patrik Niklas-Salminen (Finland) Otto Virtanen; 6–3, 6–3	(Finland) Hermanni Tiainen (Finland) Ilari Vesanen	(Italy) Lorenzo Bocchi (France) Alexis Gautier	(Estonia) Karl Kiur Saar (Republic of Ireland) Simon Carr (Germany) Patrick Mayer (Finland) Patrik Niklas-Salminen
August 13	Germany F12 Futures; Karlsruhe, Germany; Clay $15,000; Singles and doubles draws	(Russia) Ivan Gakhov; 7–6^{(7–4)}, 6–3	(Germany) Paul Wörner	(Austria) Thomas Statzberger (France) Dan Added	(Germany) Tim Heger (Argentina) Alejo Vilaro (Germany) Dominik Böhler (Georgia (country)) Aleksandre Metreveli
August 13	Germany F12 Futures; Karlsruhe, Germany; Clay $15,000; Singles and doubles draws	(France) Hugo Voljacques (Germany) Kai Wehnelt; 7–5, 7–5	(Argentina) Tomás Martín Etcheverry (Argentina) Alejo Vilaro	(Austria) Thomas Statzberger (France) Dan Added	(Germany) Tim Heger (Argentina) Alejo Vilaro (Germany) Dominik Böhler (Georgia (country)) Aleksandre Metreveli
August 13	Italy F23 Futures; Santa Cristina Gherdëina, Italy; Clay $15,000; Singles and doubles draws	(Germany) Peter Heller; 6–1, 6–3	(Italy) Jannik Sinner	(Italy) Alexander Weis (Italy) Alessandro Ceppellini	(France) Maxime Mora (Italy) Corrado Summaria (Italy) Joy Vigani (Italy) Mattia Bellucci
August 13	Italy F23 Futures; Santa Cristina Gherdëina, Italy; Clay $15,000; Singles and doubles draws	(Italy) Giacomo Dambrosi (Italy) Jannik Sinner; 6–2, 7–6^{(7–4)}	(France) Maxime Mora (Italy) Nicolò Turchetti	(Italy) Alexander Weis (Italy) Alessandro Ceppellini	(France) Maxime Mora (Italy) Corrado Summaria (Italy) Joy Vigani (Italy) Mattia Bellucci
August 13	Korea F4 Futures; Gimcheon, South Korea; Hard $15,000; Singles and doubles draws	(South Korea) Oh Seong-gook; 3–6, 6–3, 6–4	(South Korea) Kim Jae-hwan	(Japan) Ryota Tanuma (South Korea) Park Ui-sung	(South Korea) Park Min-jong (South Korea) Moon Ju-hae (United States) Mousheg Hovhannisyan (South Korea) Lee Tae-woo
August 13	Korea F4 Futures; Gimcheon, South Korea; Hard $15,000; Singles and doubles draws	(South Korea) Lee Tae-woo (South Korea) Daniel Yoo; 1–6, 6–1, [10–6]	(South Korea) Choi Jae-won (South Korea) Moon Ju-hae	(Japan) Ryota Tanuma (South Korea) Park Ui-sung	(South Korea) Park Min-jong (South Korea) Moon Ju-hae (United States) Mousheg Hovhannisyan (South Korea) Lee Tae-woo
August 13	Netherlands F4 Futures; Oldenzaal, Netherlands; Clay $15,000; Singles and doubles draws	(Bulgaria) Alexandar Lazov; 3–3, ret.	(Netherlands) Niels Lootsma	(Japan) Kazuki Nishiwaki (Argentina) Mariano Kestelboim	(Netherlands) Jesper de Jong (Netherlands) Max Houkes (France) Titouan Droguet (Colombia) Felipe Mantilla
August 13	Netherlands F4 Futures; Oldenzaal, Netherlands; Clay $15,000; Singles and doubles draws	(Netherlands) Niels Lootsma (Netherlands) Glenn Smits; 3–6, 7–5, [10–6]	(Japan) Takuto Niki (Japan) Kazuki Nishiwaki	(Japan) Kazuki Nishiwaki (Argentina) Mariano Kestelboim	(Netherlands) Jesper de Jong (Netherlands) Max Houkes (France) Titouan Droguet (Colombia) Felipe Mantilla
August 13	Portugal F15 Futures; Sintra, Portugal; Hard $15,000; Singles and doubles draws	(Egypt) Youssef Hossam; 4–6, 7–6^{(7–5)}, 7–5	(Portugal) Frederico Ferreira Silva	(United Kingdom) Aidan McHugh (Japan) Sora Fukuda	(United Kingdom) Evan Hoyt (Spain) Pedro Vives Marcos (Spain) Pablo Vivero González (France) Jonathan Kanar
August 13	Portugal F15 Futures; Sintra, Portugal; Hard $15,000; Singles and doubles draws	(United Kingdom) Jonathan Binding (Portugal) Francisco Dias; 7–6^{(7–3)}, 3–6, [10–4]	(Portugal) Gonçalo Falcão (Brazil) Diego Matos	(United Kingdom) Aidan McHugh (Japan) Sora Fukuda	(United Kingdom) Evan Hoyt (Spain) Pedro Vives Marcos (Spain) Pablo Vivero González (France) Jonathan Kanar
August 13	Russia F6 Futures; Moscow, Russia; Clay $15,000; Singles and doubles draws	(Russia) Andrey Chepelev; 6–2, 6–4	(Russia) Konstantin Kravchuk	(Russia) Richard Muzaev (Russia) Dimitriy Voronin	(Russia) Maxim Ratniuk (Belarus) Mikalai Haliak (Russia) Anton Zaitcev (Russia) Mikhail Fufygin
August 13	Russia F6 Futures; Moscow, Russia; Clay $15,000; Singles and doubles draws	(Russia) Ivan Denisov (Russia) Mikhail Sokolovskiy; 6–2, 5–7, [11–9]	(Russia) Shalva Dzhanashiya (Russia) Alexander Zhurbin	(Russia) Richard Muzaev (Russia) Dimitriy Voronin	(Russia) Maxim Ratniuk (Belarus) Mikalai Haliak (Russia) Anton Zaitcev (Russia) Mikhail Fufygin
August 13	Serbia F2 Futures; Novi Sad, Serbia; Clay $15,000; Singles and doubles draws	(France) Arthur Rinderknech; 6–2, 6–4	(Turkey) Ergi Kırkın	(Hungary) Péter Nagy (Croatia) Duje Ajduković	(United Kingdom) Barnaby Smith (United States) Maksim Tikhomirov (Italy) Simone Roncalli (Serbia) Marko Miladinović
August 13	Serbia F2 Futures; Novi Sad, Serbia; Clay $15,000; Singles and doubles draws	(Tunisia) Moez Echargui (Hungary) Péter Nagy; 5–7, 6–4, [10–6]	(Bulgaria) Gabriel Donev (Bulgaria) Plamen Milushev	(Hungary) Péter Nagy (Croatia) Duje Ajduković	(United Kingdom) Barnaby Smith (United States) Maksim Tikhomirov (Italy) Simone Roncalli (Serbia) Marko Miladinović
August 13	Spain F23 Futures; Vigo, Spain; Clay $15,000; Singles and doubles draws	(Spain) Eduard Esteve Lobato; 6–4, 5–7, 6–0	(Spain) Álvaro López San Martín	(Peru) Mauricio Echazú (Spain) Jaume Pla Malfeito	(Norway) Viktor Durasovic (Bolivia) Federico Zeballos (Switzerland) Antoine Bellier (Spain) Alberto Romero de Ávila Senise
August 13	Spain F23 Futures; Vigo, Spain; Clay $15,000; Singles and doubles draws	(Bolivia) Boris Arias (Bolivia) Federico Zeballos; 6–2, 6–3	(Spain) Sergio Martos Gornés (Spain) Jaume Pla Malfeito	(Peru) Mauricio Echazú (Spain) Jaume Pla Malfeito	(Norway) Viktor Durasovic (Bolivia) Federico Zeballos (Switzerland) Antoine Bellier (Spain) Alberto Romero de Ávila Senise
August 20	Hungary F6 Futures; Győr, Hungary; Clay $25,000; Singles and doubles draws	(France) Sadio Doumbia; 6–3, 7–6^{(7–2)}	(Czech Republic) Tadeáš Paroulek	(Colombia) Cristian Rodríguez (Czech Republic) Pavel Nejedlý	(Bosnia and Herzegovina) Aldin Šetkić (Hungary) Gábor Borsos (Ukraine) Danylo Kalenichenko (Czech Republic) Vít Kopřiva
August 20	Hungary F6 Futures; Győr, Hungary; Clay $25,000; Singles and doubles draws	(Ukraine) Danylo Kalenichenko (Slovakia) Filip Polášek; 6–4, 3–6, [19–17]	(France) Sadio Doumbia (France) Fabien Reboul	(Colombia) Cristian Rodríguez (Czech Republic) Pavel Nejedlý	(Bosnia and Herzegovina) Aldin Šetkić (Hungary) Gábor Borsos (Ukraine) Danylo Kalenichenko (Czech Republic) Vít Kopřiva
August 20	Poland F8 Futures; Poznań, Poland; Clay $25,000; Singles and doubles draws	(Bulgaria) Dimitar Kuzmanov; 6–4, 6–1	(Netherlands) Gijs Brouwer	(Ukraine) Artem Smirnov (Brazil) João Pedro Sorgi	(Poland) Paweł Ciaś (Belgium) Germain Gigounon (Netherlands) Jelle Sels (Czech Republic) Petr Nouza
August 20	Poland F8 Futures; Poznań, Poland; Clay $25,000; Singles and doubles draws	(Poland) Tomasz Bednarek (Poland) Szymon Walków; 6–4, 6–3	(Poland) Karol Drzewiecki (Poland) Mateusz Kowalczyk	(Ukraine) Artem Smirnov (Brazil) João Pedro Sorgi	(Poland) Paweł Ciaś (Belgium) Germain Gigounon (Netherlands) Jelle Sels (Czech Republic) Petr Nouza
August 20	Spain F24 Futures; Santander, Spain; Clay $25,000; Singles and doubles draws	(Spain) Javier Barranco Cosano; 6–3, 4–6, 6–4	(Russia) Ivan Gakhov	(Spain) Miguel Semmler (Spain) Oriol Roca Batalla	(Argentina) Pedro Cachin (Ecuador) Diego Hidalgo (Spain) Carlos Boluda-Purkiss (Italy) Raúl Brancaccio
August 20	Spain F24 Futures; Santander, Spain; Clay $25,000; Singles and doubles draws	(Russia) Ivan Gakhov (Spain) Jaume Pla Malfeito; 6–4, 6–4	(United Kingdom) Ryan Peniston (United Kingdom) Andrew Watson	(Spain) Miguel Semmler (Spain) Oriol Roca Batalla	(Argentina) Pedro Cachin (Ecuador) Diego Hidalgo (Spain) Carlos Boluda-Purkiss (Italy) Raúl Brancaccio
August 20	Switzerland F3 Futures; Sion, Switzerland; Clay $25,000; Singles and doubles draws	(Italy) Jacopo Berrettini; 7–5, 6–4	(Switzerland) Johan Nikles	(Russia) Alen Avidzba (Canada) Steven Diez	(Argentina) Juan Pablo Ficovich (Switzerland) Luca Stäheli (Switzerland) Jakub Paul (Switzerland) Sandro Ehrat
August 20	Switzerland F3 Futures; Sion, Switzerland; Clay $25,000; Singles and doubles draws	(Switzerland) Marc-Andrea Hüsler (Switzerland) Jakub Paul; 6–3, 6–4	(Argentina) Juan Pablo Ficovich (Argentina) Tomás Lipovšek Puches	(Russia) Alen Avidzba (Canada) Steven Diez	(Argentina) Juan Pablo Ficovich (Switzerland) Luca Stäheli (Switzerland) Jakub Paul (Switzerland) Sandro Ehrat
August 20	Belarus F3 Futures; Minsk, Belarus; Hard $15,000; Singles and doubles draws	(Italy) Francesco Vilardo; 6–1, 6–3	(Czech Republic) Marek Gengel	(Israel) Igor Smilansky (Czech Republic) David Poljak	(Russia) Yan Bondarevskiy (United Kingdom) Joshua Paris (Turkey) Sarp Ağabigün (Italy) Giorgio Ricca
August 20	Belarus F3 Futures; Minsk, Belarus; Hard $15,000; Singles and doubles draws	(Kazakhstan) Grigoriy Lomakin (Georgia (country)) George Tsivadze; 7–5, 7–6^{(7–4)}	(Czech Republic) Marek Gengel (Czech Republic) David Poljak	(Israel) Igor Smilansky (Czech Republic) David Poljak	(Russia) Yan Bondarevskiy (United Kingdom) Joshua Paris (Turkey) Sarp Ağabigün (Italy) Giorgio Ricca
August 20	Belgium F9 Futures; Huy, Belgium; Clay $15,000; Singles and doubles draws	(Germany) Jan Choinski; 3–6, 7–6^{(7–0)}, 6–3	(Northern Mariana Islands) Colin Sinclair	(France) Samuel Brosset (Argentina) Juan Bautista Otegui	(France) Dan Added (France) Maxime Mora (Belgium) Benjamin D'Hoe (Belgium) Louis Herman
August 20	Belgium F9 Futures; Huy, Belgium; Clay $15,000; Singles and doubles draws	(France) Dan Added (Belgium) Romain Barbosa; 6–4, 7–5	(United States) Luke Jacob Gamble (Northern Mariana Islands) Colin Sinclair	(France) Samuel Brosset (Argentina) Juan Bautista Otegui	(France) Dan Added (France) Maxime Mora (Belgium) Benjamin D'Hoe (Belgium) Louis Herman
August 20	China F13 Futures; Anning, China; Clay $15,000; Singles and doubles draws	(China) Bai Yan; 6–1, 6–0	(China) Wang Huixin	(Switzerland) Luca Castelnuovo (China) Wu Hao	(China) Wang Ruixuan (Chinese Taipei) Meng Cing-yang (Japan) Kazuma Kawachi (China) Liu Hanyi
August 20	China F13 Futures; Anning, China; Clay $15,000; Singles and doubles draws	(New Zealand) Rhett Purcell (New Zealand) Olly Sadler; 6–3, 6–2	(India) Anirudh Chandrasekar (India) Vignesh Peranamallur	(Switzerland) Luca Castelnuovo (China) Wu Hao	(China) Wang Ruixuan (Chinese Taipei) Meng Cing-yang (Japan) Kazuma Kawachi (China) Liu Hanyi
August 20	Germany F13 Futures; Überlingen, Germany; Clay $15,000; Singles and doubles draws	(Germany) Peter Heller; 6–3, 6–3	(Germany) Peter Torebko	(Italy) Fabrizio Ornago (Argentina) Facundo Mena	(Germany) Benjamin Hassan (Austria) Matthias Haim (Germany) Louis Wessels (Germany) Christoph Negritu
August 20	Germany F13 Futures; Überlingen, Germany; Clay $15,000; Singles and doubles draws	(Peru) Alexander Merino (Germany) Christoph Negritu; 6–3, 6–4	(Germany) Johannes Härteis (Germany) Peter Heller	(Italy) Fabrizio Ornago (Argentina) Facundo Mena	(Germany) Benjamin Hassan (Austria) Matthias Haim (Germany) Louis Wessels (Germany) Christoph Negritu
August 20	Italy F24 Futures; Cuneo, Italy; Clay $15,000; Singles and doubles draws	(Argentina) Tomás Martín Etcheverry; 6–4, 6–2	(Italy) Davide Galoppini	(Italy) Riccardo Bonadio (Italy) Alessandro Petrone	(Italy) Andrea Basso (Italy) Walter Trusendi (Switzerland) Rémy Bertola (Italy) Luca Giacomini
August 20	Italy F24 Futures; Cuneo, Italy; Clay $15,000; Singles and doubles draws	(Italy) Marco Bortolotti (Italy) Walter Trusendi; 6–3, 6–0	(Argentina) Tomás Martín Etcheverry (Italy) Corrado Summaria	(Italy) Riccardo Bonadio (Italy) Alessandro Petrone	(Italy) Andrea Basso (Italy) Walter Trusendi (Switzerland) Rémy Bertola (Italy) Luca Giacomini
August 20	Korea F5 Futures; Gimcheon, South Korea; Hard $15,000; Singles and doubles draws	(South Korea) Nam Ji-sung; 6–4, 6–1	(Japan) Makoto Ochi	(South Korea) Kim Cheong-eui (South Korea) Chung Hong	(South Korea) Kim Jae-hwan (South Korea) Son Ji-hoon (South Korea) Oh Chan-yeong (South Korea) Na Jung-woong
August 20	Korea F5 Futures; Gimcheon, South Korea; Hard $15,000; Singles and doubles draws	(South Korea) Chung Hong (South Korea) Noh Sang-woo; 7–6^{(7–4)}, 4–6, [10–8]	(South Korea) Nam Ji-sung (South Korea) Son Ji-hoon	(South Korea) Kim Cheong-eui (South Korea) Chung Hong	(South Korea) Kim Jae-hwan (South Korea) Son Ji-hoon (South Korea) Oh Chan-yeong (South Korea) Na Jung-woong
August 20	Netherlands F5 Futures; Rotterdam, Netherlands; Clay $15,000; Singles and doubles draws	(France) Manuel Guinard; 6–4, 7–6^{(7–3)}	(Slovenia) Nik Razboršek	(Netherlands) Botic van de Zandschulp (Bulgaria) Alexandar Lazov	(Argentina) Mariano Kestelboim (Germany) George von Massow (Slovenia) Tom Kočevar-Dešman (Austria) Philipp Schroll
August 20	Netherlands F5 Futures; Rotterdam, Netherlands; Clay $15,000; Singles and doubles draws	(Netherlands) Glenn Smits (Netherlands) Botic van de Zandschulp; 7–5, 7–5	(Argentina) Mariano Kestelboim (Colombia) Felipe Mantilla	(Netherlands) Botic van de Zandschulp (Bulgaria) Alexandar Lazov	(Argentina) Mariano Kestelboim (Germany) George von Massow (Slovenia) Tom Kočevar-Dešman (Austria) Philipp Schroll
August 20	Portugal F16 Futures; Sintra, Portugal; Hard $15,000; Singles and doubles draws	(Portugal) Fred Gil; 6–3, 3–6, 6–0	(Portugal) Tiago Cação	(Netherlands) Sem Verbeek (Spain) Nicolás Álvarez Varona	(United Kingdom) Evan Hoyt (United Kingdom) Jonathan Binding (France) Antoine Cornut-Chauvinc (United States) Samuel Shropshire
August 20	Portugal F16 Futures; Sintra, Portugal; Hard $15,000; Singles and doubles draws	(Portugal) Bernardo Saraiva (Netherlands) Sem Verbeek; 6–3, 6–0	(Portugal) Gonçalo Falcão (Brazil) Diego Matos	(Netherlands) Sem Verbeek (Spain) Nicolás Álvarez Varona	(United Kingdom) Evan Hoyt (United Kingdom) Jonathan Binding (France) Antoine Cornut-Chauvinc (United States) Samuel Shropshire
August 20	Romania F10 Futures; Curtea de Argeș, Romania; Clay $15,000; Singles and doubles draws	(Italy) Claudio Fortuna; 6–4, 3–6, 7–5	(Romania) Vasile-Alexandru Ghilea	(Romania) Alexandru Jecan (Italy) Nicolò Turchetti	(Ukraine) Oleg Prihodko (Russia) Mikhail Korovin (Bulgaria) Alexandar Lazarov (Tunisia) Aziz Dougaz
August 20	Romania F10 Futures; Curtea de Argeș, Romania; Clay $15,000; Singles and doubles draws	(Romania) Vasile Antonescu (Romania) Alexandru Jecan; 6–1, 6–3	(Romania) Nicolae Frunză (Romania) Nicholas David Ionel	(Romania) Alexandru Jecan (Italy) Nicolò Turchetti	(Ukraine) Oleg Prihodko (Russia) Mikhail Korovin (Bulgaria) Alexandar Lazarov (Tunisia) Aziz Dougaz
August 20	Russia F7 Futures; Moscow, Russia; Clay $15,000; Singles and doubles draws	(Russia) Alexander Zhurbin; 6–3, 7–5	(Russia) Konstantin Kravchuk	(Russia) Shalva Dzhanashiya (Russia) Victor Baluda	(Russia) Maxim Ratniuk (Russia) Yan Sabanin (Russia) Markos Kalovelonis (Russia) Andrey Chepelev
August 20	Russia F7 Futures; Moscow, Russia; Clay $15,000; Singles and doubles draws	(Russia) Mikhail Fufygin (Estonia) Vladimir Ivanov; 6–1, 7–6^{(11–9)}	(Russia) Victor Baluda (Russia) Alexander Pavlioutchenkov	(Russia) Shalva Dzhanashiya (Russia) Victor Baluda	(Russia) Maxim Ratniuk (Russia) Yan Sabanin (Russia) Markos Kalovelonis (Russia) Andrey Chepelev
August 20	Serbia F3 Futures; Novi Sad, Serbia; Clay $15,000; Singles and doubles draws	(Serbia) Marko Miladinović; 6–3, 6–4	(Tunisia) Moez Echargui	(France) Yanais Laurent (Latvia) Mārtiņš Podžus	(Serbia) Dejan Katić (Bulgaria) Gabriel Donev (Serbia) Milan Drinić (Croatia) Duje Ajduković
August 20	Serbia F3 Futures; Novi Sad, Serbia; Clay $15,000; Singles and doubles draws	(Brazil) Caio Silva (Brazil) Thales Turini; 6–1, 2–6, [11–9]	(Tunisia) Moez Echargui (France) Yanais Laurent	(France) Yanais Laurent (Latvia) Mārtiņš Podžus	(Serbia) Dejan Katić (Bulgaria) Gabriel Donev (Serbia) Milan Drinić (Croatia) Duje Ajduković
August 20	Thailand F1 Futures; Nonthaburi, Thailand; Hard $15,000; Singles and doubles draws	(United States) Ronnie Schneider; 6–4, 6–4	(Australia) Dayne Kelly	(Australia) Thomas Fancutt (Czech Republic) Patrik Rikl	(Australia) Bradley Mousley (Japan) Ryota Tanuma (Thailand) Jirat Navasirisomboon (Thailand) Pruchya Isaro
August 20	Thailand F1 Futures; Nonthaburi, Thailand; Hard $15,000; Singles and doubles draws	(United States) Ronnie Schneider (India) Karunuday Singh; 5–7, 6–1, [10–5]	(Australia) Thomas Fancutt (Thailand) Chanchai Sookton-Eng	(Australia) Thomas Fancutt (Czech Republic) Patrik Rikl	(Australia) Bradley Mousley (Japan) Ryota Tanuma (Thailand) Jirat Navasirisomboon (Thailand) Pruchya Isaro
August 27	Hungary F7 Futures; Székesfehérvár, Hungary; Clay $25,000; Singles and doubles draws	(Hungary) Máté Valkusz; 3–6, 6–3, 6–3	(Egypt) Karim-Mohamed Maamoun	(France) Sadio Doumbia (Netherlands) Jelle Sels	(Brazil) Bruno Sant'Anna (Austria) Alexander Erler (Hungary) Gábor Borsos (Slovakia) Lukáš Klein
August 27	Hungary F7 Futures; Székesfehérvár, Hungary; Clay $25,000; Singles and doubles draws	(Netherlands) Gijs Brouwer (Netherlands) Jelle Sels; 6–7^{(4–7)}, 6–3, [10–5]	(Hungary) Levente Gödry (Hungary) Péter Nagy	(France) Sadio Doumbia (Netherlands) Jelle Sels	(Brazil) Bruno Sant'Anna (Austria) Alexander Erler (Hungary) Gábor Borsos (Slovakia) Lukáš Klein
August 27	Spain F25 Futures; San Sebastián, Spain; Clay $25,000; Singles and doubles draws	(Spain) Javier Barranco Cosano; 6–1, 6–1	(Italy) Raúl Brancaccio	(Spain) Oriol Roca Batalla (Peru) Mauricio Echazú	(Israel) Yshai Oliel (Brazil) Orlando Luz (Belgium) Omar Salman (Colombia) Eduardo Struvay
August 27	Spain F25 Futures; San Sebastián, Spain; Clay $25,000; Singles and doubles draws	(Spain) Oriol Roca Batalla (Spain) Eduard Esteve Lobato; 6–3, 6–3	(Ecuador) Diego Hidalgo (Brazil) João Pedro Sorgi	(Spain) Oriol Roca Batalla (Peru) Mauricio Echazú	(Israel) Yshai Oliel (Brazil) Orlando Luz (Belgium) Omar Salman (Colombia) Eduardo Struvay
August 27	Switzerland F4 Futures; Neuchâtel, Switzerland; Clay $25,000; Singles and doubles draws	(Germany) Peter Heller; 4–6, 6–3, 6–4	(France) Matteo Martineau	(Germany) Elmar Ejupovic (Germany) Pascal Meis	(Mexico) Lucas Gómez (Argentina) Tomás Lipovšek Puches (Sweden) Christian Lindell (Argentina) Juan Pablo Ficovich
August 27	Switzerland F4 Futures; Neuchâtel, Switzerland; Clay $25,000; Singles and doubles draws	(Brazil) Eduardo Dischinger (Brazil) Diego Matos; 6–3, 6–7^{(6–8)}, [10–7]	(Netherlands) Marc Dijkhuizen (Netherlands) Bart Stevens	(Germany) Elmar Ejupovic (Germany) Pascal Meis	(Mexico) Lucas Gómez (Argentina) Tomás Lipovšek Puches (Sweden) Christian Lindell (Argentina) Juan Pablo Ficovich
August 27	Tunisia F29 Futures; La Marsa, Tunisia; Clay $25,000; Singles and doubles draws	(Italy) Fabrizio Ornago; 4–6, 6–2, 6–0	(Tunisia) Moez Echargui	(Czech Republic) Jiří Vencl (Czech Republic) Michal Konečný	(France) Nicolas Rosenzweig (Tunisia) Aziz Dougaz (Italy) Davide Galoppini (Poland) Maciej Smoła
August 27	Tunisia F29 Futures; La Marsa, Tunisia; Clay $25,000; Singles and doubles draws	(Ukraine) Vladyslav Orlov (Poland) Maciej Smoła; 0–6, 6–2, [10–6]	(Colombia) Juan Manuel Benítez Chavarriaga (United States) Preston Brown	(Czech Republic) Jiří Vencl (Czech Republic) Michal Konečný	(France) Nicolas Rosenzweig (Tunisia) Aziz Dougaz (Italy) Davide Galoppini (Poland) Maciej Smoła
August 27	Belgium F10 Futures; Damme, Belgium; Clay $15,000; Singles and doubles draws	(Belgium) Michael Geerts; 6–3, 6–3	(Northern Mariana Islands) Colin Sinclair	(Belgium) Maxime Pauwels (Spain) Nikolás Sánchez Izquierdo	(Belgium) Jonas Merckx (Germany) Mats Rosenkranz (Argentina) Juan Bautista Otegui (Belgium) Benjamin D'Hoe
August 27	Belgium F10 Futures; Damme, Belgium; Clay $15,000; Singles and doubles draws	(France) Corentin Denolly (France) François-Arthur Vibert; 6–4, 2–6, [11–9]	(Germany) Valentin Günther (Germany) Mats Rosenkranz	(Belgium) Maxime Pauwels (Spain) Nikolás Sánchez Izquierdo	(Belgium) Jonas Merckx (Germany) Mats Rosenkranz (Argentina) Juan Bautista Otegui (Belgium) Benjamin D'Hoe
August 27	China F14 Futures; Anning, China; Clay $15,000; Singles and doubles draws	(Switzerland) Luca Castelnuovo; 6–1, 7–6^{(7–4)}	(Australia) Jeremy Beale	(Chinese Taipei) Tan Li-wie (India) Ranjeet Virali-Murugesan	(China) Zhou Shenghao (China) Wu Hao (China) Zheng Weiqiang (China) Wang Ruixuan
August 27	China F14 Futures; Anning, China; Clay $15,000; Singles and doubles draws	(Australia) Jeremy Beale (Switzerland) Luca Castelnuovo; 6–3, 3–6, [10–3]	(India) Anirudh Chandrasekar (India) Vignesh Peranamallur	(Chinese Taipei) Tan Li-wie (India) Ranjeet Virali-Murugesan	(China) Zhou Shenghao (China) Wu Hao (China) Zheng Weiqiang (China) Wang Ruixuan
August 27	Italy F25 Futures; Piombino, Italy; Hard $15,000; Singles and doubles draws	(Finland) Emil Ruusuvuori; 6–1, 6–2	(Germany) Sami Reinwein	(Italy) Francesco Vilardo (Sweden) Fred Simonsson	(Italy) Luca Giacomini (France) Jaimee Floyd Angele (France) Laurent Lokoli (Germany) Robin Kern
August 27	Italy F25 Futures; Piombino, Italy; Hard $15,000; Singles and doubles draws	(Germany) Robin Kern (Germany) Sami Reinwein; 4–6, 6–4, [10–6]	(United Kingdom) Luke Johnson (Sweden) Fred Simonsson	(Italy) Francesco Vilardo (Sweden) Fred Simonsson	(Italy) Luca Giacomini (France) Jaimee Floyd Angele (France) Laurent Lokoli (Germany) Robin Kern
August 27	Korea F6 Futures; Anseong, South Korea; Clay (indoor) $15,000; Singles and doubles draws	(South Korea) Song Min-kyu; 4–6, 7–6^{(8–6)}, 6–2	(South Korea) Shin San-hui	(Monaco) Lucas Catarina (South Korea) Oh Seong-gook	(South Korea) Jeong Yeong-seok (South Korea) Lee Tae-woo (South Korea) Kim Young-seok (South Korea) Na Jung-woong
August 27	Korea F6 Futures; Anseong, South Korea; Clay (indoor) $15,000; Singles and doubles draws	(South Korea) Lee Jea-moon (South Korea) Song Min-kyu; 6–2, 6–1	(South Korea) Chung Hong (South Korea) Noh Sang-woo	(Monaco) Lucas Catarina (South Korea) Oh Seong-gook	(South Korea) Jeong Yeong-seok (South Korea) Lee Tae-woo (South Korea) Kim Young-seok (South Korea) Na Jung-woong
August 27	Netherlands F6 Futures; Haren, Netherlands; Clay $15,000; Singles and doubles draws	(Slovenia) Nik Razboršek; 7–6^{(10–8)}, 6–4	(Slovenia) Tom Kočevar-Dešman	(France) Matthieu Perchicot (Netherlands) Colin van Beem	(Netherlands) Botic van de Zandschulp (United States) Justin Butsch (Colombia) Felipe Mantilla (Netherlands) Stephan Gerritsen
August 27	Netherlands F6 Futures; Haren, Netherlands; Clay $15,000; Singles and doubles draws	(Poland) Yann Wójcik (Poland) Kacper Żuk; 4–6, 6–4, [10–3]	(Netherlands) Maikel Borg (Netherlands) Stephan Gerritsen	(France) Matthieu Perchicot (Netherlands) Colin van Beem	(Netherlands) Botic van de Zandschulp (United States) Justin Butsch (Colombia) Felipe Mantilla (Netherlands) Stephan Gerritsen
August 27	Romania F11 Futures; Chitila, Romania; Clay $15,000; Singles and doubles draws	(Italy) Nicolò Turchetti; 3–6, 6–2, 6–4	(Romania) Vlad Andrei Dancu	(Spain) Imanol López Morillo (Sweden) Dragoș Nicolae Mădăraș	(Romania) Nicolae Frunză (Romania) Vladislav Melnic (Ukraine) Oleg Prihodko (Romania) Bogdan Borza
August 27	Romania F11 Futures; Chitila, Romania; Clay $15,000; Singles and doubles draws	(Romania) Vasile Antonescu (Romania) Alexandru Jecan; 4–6, 6–3, [10–8]	(Romania) Andrei Ștefan Apostol (Romania) Nicolae Frunză	(Spain) Imanol López Morillo (Sweden) Dragoș Nicolae Mădăraș	(Romania) Nicolae Frunză (Romania) Vladislav Melnic (Ukraine) Oleg Prihodko (Romania) Bogdan Borza
August 27	Russia F8 Futures; Moscow, Russia; Clay $15,000; Singles and doubles draws	(Russia) Evgenii Tiurnev; 6–1, 6–1	(Russia) Konstantin Kravchuk	(Russia) Timur Kiyamov (Russia) Savriyan Danilov	(Estonia) Vladimir Ivanov (Russia) Yan Sabanin (Russia) Alexander Boborykin (Russia) Bogdan Bobrov
August 27	Russia F8 Futures; Moscow, Russia; Clay $15,000; Singles and doubles draws	(Russia) Konstantin Kravchuk (Russia) Alexander Pavlioutchenkov; 6–2, 4–6, [10–6]	(Russia) Bogdan Bobrov (Russia) Maxim Ratniuk	(Russia) Timur Kiyamov (Russia) Savriyan Danilov	(Estonia) Vladimir Ivanov (Russia) Yan Sabanin (Russia) Alexander Boborykin (Russia) Bogdan Bobrov
August 27	Serbia F4 Futures; Subotica, Serbia; Clay $15,000; Singles and doubles draws	(Latvia) Mārtiņš Podžus; 6–2, 7–6^{(8–6)}	(Serbia) Marko Miladinović	(North Macedonia) Gorazd Srbljak (Czech Republic) Tadeáš Paroulek	(Croatia) Duje Ajduković (Croatia) Alen Rogić Hadžalić (Czech Republic) Jaroslav Pospíšil (Croatia) Ivan Sabanov
August 27	Serbia F4 Futures; Subotica, Serbia; Clay $15,000; Singles and doubles draws	(Croatia) Ivan Sabanov (Croatia) Matej Sabanov; 6–2, 6–1	(Czech Republic) Vít Kopřiva (Czech Republic) Jaroslav Pospíšil	(North Macedonia) Gorazd Srbljak (Czech Republic) Tadeáš Paroulek	(Croatia) Duje Ajduković (Croatia) Alen Rogić Hadžalić (Czech Republic) Jaroslav Pospíšil (Croatia) Ivan Sabanov
August 27	Thailand F2 Futures; Nonthaburi, Thailand; Hard $15,000; Singles and doubles draws	(Czech Republic) Patrik Rikl; 6–2, 6–4	(Uzbekistan) Sanjar Fayziev	(United States) Ronnie Schneider (Australia) Dayne Kelly	(Australia) Thomas Fancutt (Thailand) Wishaya Trongcharoenchaikul (Japan) Takashi Saito (Japan) Ryota Tanuma
August 27	Thailand F2 Futures; Nonthaburi, Thailand; Hard $15,000; Singles and doubles draws	(United States) Adam El Mihdawy (United States) Tyler Mercier; 4–6, 7–6^{(7–3)}, [10–5]	(Thailand) Nuttanon Kadchapanan (Thailand) Palaphoom Kovapitukted	(United States) Ronnie Schneider (Australia) Dayne Kelly	(Australia) Thomas Fancutt (Thailand) Wishaya Trongcharoenchaikul (Japan) Takashi Saito (Japan) Ryota Tanuma
August 27	Ukraine F4 Futures; Bucha, Ukraine; Clay $15,000; Singles and doubles draws	(Italy) Alessandro Petrone; 6–4, 6–3	(Ukraine) Oleksii Krutykh	(Ukraine) Dmytro Kamynin (Ukraine) Artem Smirnov	(Ukraine) Nikita Mashtakov (Ukraine) Oleg Dolgosheyev (Italy) Lorenzo Bocchi (Ukraine) Ivan Sergeyev
August 27	Ukraine F4 Futures; Bucha, Ukraine; Clay $15,000; Singles and doubles draws	(Ukraine) Oleg Dolgosheyev (Ukraine) Dmytro Kamynin; 6–0, 6–2	(Ukraine) Vladyslav Gorodynskyi (Ukraine) Vsevolod Oliynyk	(Ukraine) Dmytro Kamynin (Ukraine) Artem Smirnov	(Ukraine) Nikita Mashtakov (Ukraine) Oleg Dolgosheyev (Italy) Lorenzo Bocchi (Ukraine) Ivan Sergeyev

=== September ===
Week of	Tournament	Winner	Runners-up	Semifinalists	Quarterfinalists
September 3	Canada F6 Futures; Niagara, Canada; Hard (indoor) $25,000; Singles and doubles draws	(United States) Alafia Ayeni; 6–3, 6–3	(United States) Felix Corwin	(Colombia) Alejandro Gómez (United States) Harrison Adams	(Canada) Pavel Krainik (United States) Nick Chappell (United States) Roy Smith (Japan) Hiroyasu Ehara
September 3	Canada F6 Futures; Niagara, Canada; Hard (indoor) $25,000; Singles and doubles draws	(United States) Charlie Emhardt (United States) Samuel Shropshire; 7–5, 1–6, [10–3]	(United States) Harrison Adams (United States) Junior Alexander Ore	(Colombia) Alejandro Gómez (United States) Harrison Adams	(Canada) Pavel Krainik (United States) Nick Chappell (United States) Roy Smith (Japan) Hiroyasu Ehara
September 3	France F16 Futures; Bagnères-de-Bigorre, France; Hard $25,000+H; Singles and doubles draws	(France) Albano Olivetti; 7–6^{(7–2)}, 7–6^{(7–3)}	(France) Corentin Denolly	(France) Sadio Doumbia (France) Fabien Reboul	(Belgium) Yannick Mertens (France) Lény Mitjana (Germany) Lukas Ollert (Colombia) Eduardo Struvay
September 3	France F16 Futures; Bagnères-de-Bigorre, France; Hard $25,000+H; Singles and doubles draws	(Belgium) Niels Desein (Belgium) Yannick Mertens; 6–7^{(7–9)}, 7–5, [10–5]	(France) Dan Added (France) Albano Olivetti	(France) Sadio Doumbia (France) Fabien Reboul	(Belgium) Yannick Mertens (France) Lény Mitjana (Germany) Lukas Ollert (Colombia) Eduardo Struvay
September 3	Italy F26 Futures; Trieste, Italy; Clay $25,000; Singles and doubles draws	(Netherlands) Gijs Brouwer; 6–4, 6–4	(Netherlands) Jelle Sels	(Brazil) Oscar José Gutierrez (Germany) Peter Torebko	(Sweden) Jonathan Mridha (Egypt) Karim-Mohamed Maamoun (Croatia) Franjo Raspudić (Italy) Davide Galoppini
September 3	Italy F26 Futures; Trieste, Italy; Clay $25,000; Singles and doubles draws	(Italy) Enrico Dalla Valle (Brazil) Oscar José Gutierrez; 3–6, 6–3, [10–4]	(Serbia) Milan Radojković (Germany) Peter Torebko	(Brazil) Oscar José Gutierrez (Germany) Peter Torebko	(Sweden) Jonathan Mridha (Egypt) Karim-Mohamed Maamoun (Croatia) Franjo Raspudić (Italy) Davide Galoppini
September 3	Spain F26 Futures; Oviedo, Spain; Clay $25,000; Singles and doubles draws	(Spain) Eduard Esteve Lobato; 6–3, 1–0 ret.	(Belgium) Germain Gigounon	(Belgium) Omar Salman (Spain) Miguel Semmler	(Brazil) Felipe Meligeni Alves (Brazil) João Pedro Sorgi (Brazil) Orlando Luz (Spain) Benjamín Winter López
September 3	Spain F26 Futures; Oviedo, Spain; Clay $25,000; Singles and doubles draws	(Brazil) Orlando Luz (Brazil) Felipe Meligeni Alves; 5–7, 6–4, [11–9]	(Brazil) Diego Matos (Brazil) João Pedro Sorgi	(Belgium) Omar Salman (Spain) Miguel Semmler	(Brazil) Felipe Meligeni Alves (Brazil) João Pedro Sorgi (Brazil) Orlando Luz (Spain) Benjamín Winter López
September 3	Switzerland F5 Futures; Schlieren, Switzerland; Clay $25,000; Singles and doubles draws	(Germany) Louis Wessels; 6–3, 6–4	(Switzerland) Sandro Ehrat	(Finland) Harri Heliövaara (Finland) Patrik Niklas-Salminen	(United States) Alexander Ritschard (Germany) Marvin Netuschil (Brazil) Bruno Sant'Anna (France) Samuel Bensoussan
September 3	Switzerland F5 Futures; Schlieren, Switzerland; Clay $25,000; Singles and doubles draws	(Finland) Harri Heliövaara (Finland) Patrik Niklas-Salminen; 6–3, 6–1	(Czech Republic) Petr Nouza (Czech Republic) David Škoch	(Finland) Harri Heliövaara (Finland) Patrik Niklas-Salminen	(United States) Alexander Ritschard (Germany) Marvin Netuschil (Brazil) Bruno Sant'Anna (France) Samuel Bensoussan
September 3	Argentina F4 Futures; Rosario, Argentina; Clay $15,000; Singles and doubles draws	(Argentina) Matías Zukas; 7–6^{(7–3)}, 6–3	(Argentina) Santiago Rodríguez Taverna	(Argentina) Juan Ignacio Galarza (Argentina) Valentín Florez	(Argentina) Gonzalo Villanueva (Brazil) Rafael Matos (Argentina) Genaro Alberto Olivieri (Argentina) Gerónimo Espín Busleiman
September 3	Argentina F4 Futures; Rosario, Argentina; Clay $15,000; Singles and doubles draws	(Argentina) Franco Agamenone (Argentina) Matías Zukas; 6–3, 7–6^{(7–5)}	(Argentina) Maximiliano Estévez (Brazil) Rafael Matos	(Argentina) Juan Ignacio Galarza (Argentina) Valentín Florez	(Argentina) Gonzalo Villanueva (Brazil) Rafael Matos (Argentina) Genaro Alberto Olivieri (Argentina) Gerónimo Espín Busleiman
September 3	Romania F12 Futures; Brașov, Romania; Clay $15,000; Singles and doubles draws	(Romania) Vasile-Alexandru Ghilea; 6–3, 2–6, 6–2	(Italy) Claudio Fortuna	(Romania) Dan Alexandru Tomescu (Ukraine) Oleg Prihodko	(Romania) Nicolae Frunză (Belgium) Maxime Pauwels (Russia) Mikhail Korovin (Romania) Vasile Antonescu
September 3	Romania F12 Futures; Brașov, Romania; Clay $15,000; Singles and doubles draws	(Argentina) Franco Emanuel Egea (Argentina) Gabriel Alejandro Hidalgo; 7–5, 6–4	(Romania) Petru-Alexandru Luncanu (Romania) Călin Manda	(Romania) Dan Alexandru Tomescu (Ukraine) Oleg Prihodko	(Romania) Nicolae Frunză (Belgium) Maxime Pauwels (Russia) Mikhail Korovin (Romania) Vasile Antonescu
September 3	Serbia F5 Futures; Zlatibor, Serbia; Clay $15,000; Singles and doubles draws	(Serbia) Dejan Katić; 6–4, 7–5	(United States) Justin Butsch	(Russia) Denis Klok (Iran) Shahin Khaledan	(Hungary) Fábián Marozsán (Serbia) Pavle Daljev (Hungary) Marcell Bartakovics (North Macedonia) Shendrit Deari
September 3	Serbia F5 Futures; Zlatibor, Serbia; Clay $15,000; Singles and doubles draws	(Brazil) Caio Silva (Brazil) Thales Turini; 6–4, 6–2	(Slovakia) Martin Fekiač (Hungary) Fábián Marozsán	(Russia) Denis Klok (Iran) Shahin Khaledan	(Hungary) Fábián Marozsán (Serbia) Pavle Daljev (Hungary) Marcell Bartakovics (North Macedonia) Shendrit Deari
September 3	Thailand F3 Futures; Nonthaburi, Thailand; Hard $15,000; Singles and doubles draws	(Thailand) Wishaya Trongcharoenchaikul; 6–2, 4–6, 7–6^{(8–6)}	(Thailand) Pruchya Isaro	(United States) Adam El Mihdawy (Japan) Soichiro Moritani	(India) Karunuday Singh (Australia) Thomas Fancutt (Japan) Kento Takeuchi (Japan) Takashi Saito
September 3	Thailand F3 Futures; Nonthaburi, Thailand; Hard $15,000; Singles and doubles draws	(Thailand) Pruchya Isaro (Canada) Kelsey Stevenson; 6–3, 4–6, [10–7]	(Chinese Taipei) Lin Wei-de (Thailand) Wishaya Trongcharoenchaikul	(United States) Adam El Mihdawy (Japan) Soichiro Moritani	(India) Karunuday Singh (Australia) Thomas Fancutt (Japan) Kento Takeuchi (Japan) Takashi Saito
September 3	Tunisia F30 Futures; Monastir, Tunisia; Hard $15,000; Singles and doubles draws	(Colombia) Juan Manuel Benítez Chavarriaga; 6–1, 6–4	(Belgium) Benjamin D'Hoe	(France) Hugo Pontico (Spain) Jorge Blanco Guadalupe	(Germany) Christoph Negritu (Tunisia) Aziz Ouakaa (United Kingdom) Luke Johnson (Italy) Georg Winkler
September 3	Tunisia F30 Futures; Monastir, Tunisia; Hard $15,000; Singles and doubles draws	(Peru) Alexander Merino (Germany) Christoph Negritu; 6–3, 6–1	(Spain) Jorge Blanco Guadalupe (Italy) Joy Vigani	(France) Hugo Pontico (Spain) Jorge Blanco Guadalupe	(Germany) Christoph Negritu (Tunisia) Aziz Ouakaa (United Kingdom) Luke Johnson (Italy) Georg Winkler
September 10	Canada F7 Futures; Toronto, Canada; Hard $25,000; Singles and doubles draws	(United States) Nick Chappell; 6–2, 6–0	(United Kingdom) Lloyd Glasspool	(United States) Harrison Adams (Greece) Michail Pervolarakis	(United States) Felix Corwin (United Kingdom) Jack Findel-Hawkins (Japan) Takuto Niki (Canada) Liam Draxl
September 10	Canada F7 Futures; Toronto, Canada; Hard $25,000; Singles and doubles draws	(Italy) Francesco Ferrari (Greece) Michail Pervolarakis; 6–3, 6–3	(United States) Felix Corwin (Japan) Takuto Niki	(United States) Harrison Adams (Greece) Michail Pervolarakis	(United States) Felix Corwin (United Kingdom) Jack Findel-Hawkins (Japan) Takuto Niki (Canada) Liam Draxl
September 10	France F17 Futures; Mulhouse, France; Hard (indoor) $25,000+H; Singles and doubles draws	(Spain) Andrés Artuñedo; 7–6^{(8–6)}, 7–5	(France) Grégoire Jacq	(Belgium) Christopher Heyman (Sweden) Linus Frost	(Réunion) Quentin Robert (Colombia) Eduardo Struvay (France) Lucas Poullain (France) Dan Added
September 10	France F17 Futures; Mulhouse, France; Hard (indoor) $25,000+H; Singles and doubles draws	(Sweden) Linus Frost (Sweden) Christian Samuelsson; 6–2, 6–1	(Spain) Andrés Artuñedo (Colombia) José Daniel Bendeck	(Belgium) Christopher Heyman (Sweden) Linus Frost	(Réunion) Quentin Robert (Colombia) Eduardo Struvay (France) Lucas Poullain (France) Dan Added
September 10	Italy F27 Futures; Pula, Italy; Clay $25,000; Singles and doubles draws	(Germany) Louis Wessels; 6–3, 5–7, 6–1	(Italy) Marco Bortolotti	(France) Samuel Bensoussan (Italy) Riccardo Bonadio	(Brazil) Oscar José Gutierrez (Italy) Antonio Massara (Italy) Alessandro Ingarao (Italy) Walter Trusendi
September 10	Italy F27 Futures; Pula, Italy; Clay $25,000; Singles and doubles draws	(Switzerland) Rémy Bertola (Italy) Alessandro Ceppellini; 6–2, 6–4	(Italy) Alessandro Petrone (Italy) Nicolò Turchetti	(France) Samuel Bensoussan (Italy) Riccardo Bonadio	(Brazil) Oscar José Gutierrez (Italy) Antonio Massara (Italy) Alessandro Ingarao (Italy) Walter Trusendi
September 10	Spain F27 Futures; Seville, Spain; Clay $25,000+H; Singles and doubles draws	(Spain) Carlos Boluda-Purkiss; 6–1, 6–1	(Belgium) Omar Salman	(France) Geoffrey Blancaneaux (Spain) Eduard Esteve Lobato	(Spain) Pol Toledo Bagué (Brazil) Orlando Luz (Russia) Alexander Zhurbin (Spain) Marc Fornell Mestres
September 10	Spain F27 Futures; Seville, Spain; Clay $25,000+H; Singles and doubles draws	(Guatemala) Christopher Díaz Figueroa (Guatemala) Wilfredo González; 4–6, 7–6^{(7–4)}, [10–5]	(Brazil) Orlando Luz (Brazil) Felipe Meligeni Alves	(France) Geoffrey Blancaneaux (Spain) Eduard Esteve Lobato	(Spain) Pol Toledo Bagué (Brazil) Orlando Luz (Russia) Alexander Zhurbin (Spain) Marc Fornell Mestres
September 10	Argentina F5 Futures; Villa del Dique, Argentina; Clay $15,000; Singles and doubles draws	(Argentina) Camilo Ugo Carabelli; 6–2, 7–6^{(7–1)}	(Peru) Nicolás Álvarez	(Argentina) Genaro Alberto Olivieri (Argentina) Gonzalo Villanueva	(Argentina) Francisco Cerúndolo (Argentina) Santiago Rodríguez Taverna (Brazil) Rafael Matos (Argentina) Maximiliano Estévez
September 10	Argentina F5 Futures; Villa del Dique, Argentina; Clay $15,000; Singles and doubles draws	(Argentina) Franco Agamenone (Argentina) Alejo Vilaro; 2–6, 6–4, [10–7]	(Argentina) Maximiliano Estévez (Argentina) Facundo Juárez	(Argentina) Genaro Alberto Olivieri (Argentina) Gonzalo Villanueva	(Argentina) Francisco Cerúndolo (Argentina) Santiago Rodríguez Taverna (Brazil) Rafael Matos (Argentina) Maximiliano Estévez
September 10	Bolivia F1 Futures; Santa Cruz, Bolivia; Clay $15,000; Singles and doubles draws	(Bolivia) Federico Zeballos; 6–3, 7–6^{(7–4)}	(Argentina) Matías Zukas	(Argentina) Luciano Doria (Brazil) José Pereira	(Argentina) Matías Franco Descotte (Argentina) Ignacio Carou (Bolivia) Raúl García (Bolivia) Juan Carlos Aguilar
September 10	Bolivia F1 Futures; Santa Cruz, Bolivia; Clay $15,000; Singles and doubles draws	(Bolivia) Federico Zeballos (Argentina) Matías Zukas; 6–7^{(6–8)}, 6–1, [10–5]	(Bolivia) Juan Carlos Aguilar (Argentina) Franco Capalbo	(Argentina) Luciano Doria (Brazil) José Pereira	(Argentina) Matías Franco Descotte (Argentina) Ignacio Carou (Bolivia) Raúl García (Bolivia) Juan Carlos Aguilar
September 10	Egypt F18 Futures; Cairo, Egypt; Clay $15,000; Singles and doubles draws	(Austria) Alexander Erler; 6–2, 7–5	(Italy) Simone Roncalli	(Brazil) Jordan Correia (Morocco) Anas Fattar	(Italy) Stefano Baldoni (Japan) Rimpei Kawakami (Croatia) Neven Krivokuća (Italy) Dante Gennaro
September 10	Egypt F18 Futures; Cairo, Egypt; Clay $15,000; Singles and doubles draws	(Austria) Alexander Erler (Russia) Markos Kalovelonis; 6–4, 7–6^{(7–3)}	(India) Anirudh Chandrasekar (India) Aryan Goveas	(Brazil) Jordan Correia (Morocco) Anas Fattar	(Italy) Stefano Baldoni (Japan) Rimpei Kawakami (Croatia) Neven Krivokuća (Italy) Dante Gennaro
September 10	Great Britain F4 Futures; Nottingham, United Kingdom; Hard $15,000; Singles and doubles draws	(United Kingdom) Jack Draper; 3–6, 7–6^{(7–3)}, 6–0	(United Kingdom) Andrew Watson	(United Kingdom) Ryan Peniston (Germany) Constantin Schmitz	(United Kingdom) Billy Harris (Germany) Frederik Press (United Kingdom) Imran Aswat (Germany) Lukas Ollert
September 10	Great Britain F4 Futures; Nottingham, United Kingdom; Hard $15,000; Singles and doubles draws	(United Kingdom) Jonathan Binding (United Kingdom) Scott Duncan; 6–2, 7–6^{(8–6)}	(Estonia) Daniil Glinka (Estonia) Karl Kiur Saar	(United Kingdom) Ryan Peniston (Germany) Constantin Schmitz	(United Kingdom) Billy Harris (Germany) Frederik Press (United Kingdom) Imran Aswat (Germany) Lukas Ollert
September 10	Kazakhstan F6 Futures; Almaty, Kazakhstan; Clay $15,000; Singles and doubles draws	(Russia) Denis Klok; 6–3, 4–6, 7–5	(Netherlands) Colin van Beem	(Russia) Andrey Chepelev (Kazakhstan) Roman Khassanov	(Russia) Matvey Minin (Kazakhstan) Timur Maulenov (Kazakhstan) Sagadat Ayap (Belarus) Mikalai Haliak
September 10	Kazakhstan F6 Futures; Almaty, Kazakhstan; Clay $15,000; Singles and doubles draws	(Kazakhstan) Sagadat Ayap (Kazakhstan) Grigoriy Lomakin; 6–3, 6–4	(Italy) Andrea Bessire (Italy) Francesco Bessire	(Russia) Andrey Chepelev (Kazakhstan) Roman Khassanov	(Russia) Matvey Minin (Kazakhstan) Timur Maulenov (Kazakhstan) Sagadat Ayap (Belarus) Mikalai Haliak
September 10	Romania F13 Futures; Iași, Romania; Clay $15,000; Singles and doubles draws	(Germany) Lucas Gerch; 6–4, 6–2	(Russia) Kirill Kivattsev	(Belgium) Maxime Pauwels (Argentina) Juan Bautista Otegui	(Ukraine) Oleksii Krutykh (Romania) Vasile Antonescu (Argentina) Gabriel Alejandro Hidalgo (Romania) Călin Manda
September 10	Romania F13 Futures; Iași, Romania; Clay $15,000; Singles and doubles draws	(Argentina) Franco Emanuel Egea (Argentina) Gabriel Alejandro Hidalgo; 6–2, 6–2	(Romania) Vasile Antonescu (Romania) Petru-Alexandru Luncanu	(Belgium) Maxime Pauwels (Argentina) Juan Bautista Otegui	(Ukraine) Oleksii Krutykh (Romania) Vasile Antonescu (Argentina) Gabriel Alejandro Hidalgo (Romania) Călin Manda
September 10	Tunisia F31 Futures; Monastir, Tunisia; Hard $15,000; Singles and doubles draws	(France) Gabriel Petit; 7–6^{(7–5)}, 7–6^{(7–4)}	(Northern Mariana Islands) Colin Sinclair	(Benin) Alexis Klégou (United Kingdom) Luke Johnson	(Italy) Moritz Trocker (Italy) Andrea Borroni (New Zealand) Macsen Sisam (Colombia) Juan Manuel Benítez Chavarriaga
September 10	Tunisia F31 Futures; Monastir, Tunisia; Hard $15,000; Singles and doubles draws	(United Kingdom) Luke Johnson (Germany) Christian Seraphim; 4–6, 6–2, [10–8]	(Colombia) Juan Manuel Benítez Chavarriaga (Spain) Jorge Blanco Guadalupe	(Benin) Alexis Klégou (United Kingdom) Luke Johnson	(Italy) Moritz Trocker (Italy) Andrea Borroni (New Zealand) Macsen Sisam (Colombia) Juan Manuel Benítez Chavarriaga
September 10	USA F24 Futures; Claremont, United States; Hard $15,000; Singles and doubles draws	(United States) Brandon Holt; 3–6, 6–3, 6–2	(United States) Martin Redlicki	(United States) Samuel Shropshire (Czech Republic) Matěj Vocel	(United States) Nicolas Moreno de Alboran (Israel) Daniel Cukierman (Brazil) Igor Gimenez (United States) Henry Craig
September 10	USA F24 Futures; Claremont, United States; Hard $15,000; Singles and doubles draws	(United States) Robert Kelly (United States) Korey Lovett; 7–6^{(7–3)}, 6–4	(United States) Paul Oosterbaan (United States) Samuel Shropshire	(United States) Samuel Shropshire (Czech Republic) Matěj Vocel	(United States) Nicolas Moreno de Alboran (Israel) Daniel Cukierman (Brazil) Igor Gimenez (United States) Henry Craig
September 17	Australia F5 Futures; Cairns, Australia; Hard $25,000; Singles and doubles draws	(Australia) Jacob Grills; 6–1, 6–7^{(2–7)}, 7–5	(United Kingdom) Brydan Klein	(Australia) Jeremy Beale (Australia) Jayden Court	(United Kingdom) Evan Hoyt (Japan) Issei Okamura (United States) Dusty Boyer (United Kingdom) Ryan James Storrie
September 17	Australia F5 Futures; Cairns, Australia; Hard $25,000; Singles and doubles draws	(United States) Dusty Boyer (United Kingdom) Evan Hoyt; 6–2, 7–5	(Australia) Jacob Grills (Australia) Calum Puttergill	(Australia) Jeremy Beale (Australia) Jayden Court	(United Kingdom) Evan Hoyt (Japan) Issei Okamura (United States) Dusty Boyer (United Kingdom) Ryan James Storrie
September 17	Italy F28 Futures; Pula, Italy; Clay $25,000; Singles and doubles draws	(Serbia) Miljan Zekić; 6–3, 6–3	(Italy) Alessandro Petrone	(United Kingdom) Billy Harris (Argentina) Mateo Nicolás Martínez	(Italy) Walter Trusendi (Austria) Gibril Diarra (Germany) Adrian Obert (Italy) Marco Bortolotti
September 17	Italy F28 Futures; Pula, Italy; Clay $25,000; Singles and doubles draws	(Italy) Marco Bortolotti (Italy) Walter Trusendi; 7–5, 6–2	(Austria) Gibril Diarra (Austria) Peter Goldsteiner	(United Kingdom) Billy Harris (Argentina) Mateo Nicolás Martínez	(Italy) Walter Trusendi (Austria) Gibril Diarra (Germany) Adrian Obert (Italy) Marco Bortolotti
September 17	Spain F28 Futures; Madrid, Spain; Clay (indoor) $25,000; Singles and doubles draws	(Italy) Raúl Brancaccio; 6–3, 3–6, 6–1	(Chile) Gonzalo Lama	(Spain) Daniel Muñoz de la Nava (Morocco) Lamine Ouahab	(Spain) Marc Fornell Mestres (Vietnam) Lý Hoàng Nam (Spain) Marc Giner (United States) Ulises Blanch
September 17	Spain F28 Futures; Madrid, Spain; Clay (indoor) $25,000; Singles and doubles draws	(Guatemala) Christopher Díaz Figueroa (Guatemala) Wilfredo González; 3–6, 6–3, [10–6]	(Italy) Raúl Brancaccio (Spain) Sergio Martos Gornés	(Spain) Daniel Muñoz de la Nava (Morocco) Lamine Ouahab	(Spain) Marc Fornell Mestres (Vietnam) Lý Hoàng Nam (Spain) Marc Giner (United States) Ulises Blanch
September 17	Argentina F6 Futures; Buenos Aires, Argentina; Clay $15,000; Singles and doubles draws	(Argentina) Gonzalo Villanueva; 6–0, 6–3	(Argentina) Francisco Cerúndolo	(Argentina) Sebastián Báez (Argentina) Maximiliano Estévez	(Argentina) Juan Ignacio Galarza (Argentina) Franco Agamenone (Argentina) Camilo Ugo Carabelli (Argentina) Genaro Alberto Olivieri
September 17	Argentina F6 Futures; Buenos Aires, Argentina; Clay $15,000; Singles and doubles draws	(Argentina) Juan Ignacio Galarza (Argentina) Mariano Kestelboim; 7–6^{(7–5)}, 6–2	(Argentina) Franco Agamenone (Argentina) Maximiliano Estévez	(Argentina) Sebastián Báez (Argentina) Maximiliano Estévez	(Argentina) Juan Ignacio Galarza (Argentina) Franco Agamenone (Argentina) Camilo Ugo Carabelli (Argentina) Genaro Alberto Olivieri
September 17	Bolivia F2 Futures; Santa Cruz, Bolivia; Clay $15,000; Singles and doubles draws	(Argentina) Matías Franco Descotte; 6–3, 1–6, 6–4	(Bolivia) Federico Zeballos	(Argentina) Fermín Tenti (Argentina) Matías Zukas	(Brazil) Matheus Pucinelli de Almeida (Brazil) José Pereira (Brazil) André Miele (Argentina) Luciano Doria
September 17	Bolivia F2 Futures; Santa Cruz, Bolivia; Clay $15,000; Singles and doubles draws	(Bolivia) Juan Carlos Aguilar (Argentina) Franco Capalbo; 6–3, 6–3	(Bolivia) Federico Zeballos (Argentina) Matías Zukas	(Argentina) Fermín Tenti (Argentina) Matías Zukas	(Brazil) Matheus Pucinelli de Almeida (Brazil) José Pereira (Brazil) André Miele (Argentina) Luciano Doria
September 17	Egypt F19 Futures; Cairo, Egypt; Clay $15,000; Singles and doubles draws	(Austria) Alexander Erler; 6–3, 6–1	(Brazil) Jordan Correia	(Czech Republic) Petr Hájek (Italy) Luca Prevosto	(Czech Republic) Filip Duda (Japan) Rimpei Kawakami (Italy) Simone Roncalli (Italy) Stefano Baldoni
September 17	Egypt F19 Futures; Cairo, Egypt; Clay $15,000; Singles and doubles draws	(Russia) Alexander Ovcharov (India) Jayesh Pungliya; 6–3, 2–6, [10–8]	(Czech Republic) Petr Hájek (Czech Republic) Ondřej Krstev	(Czech Republic) Petr Hájek (Italy) Luca Prevosto	(Czech Republic) Filip Duda (Japan) Rimpei Kawakami (Italy) Simone Roncalli (Italy) Stefano Baldoni
September 17	France F18 Futures; Plaisir, France; Hard (indoor) $15,000+H; Singles and doubles draws	(Belgium) Yannick Mertens; 7–6^{(8–6)}, 6–2	(France) Antoine Cornut-Chauvinc	(France) Manuel Guinard (France) Antoine Escoffier	(Netherlands) Botic van de Zandschulp (France) Jurgen Briand (France) Grégoire Jacq (Russia) Alen Avidzba
September 17	France F18 Futures; Plaisir, France; Hard (indoor) $15,000+H; Singles and doubles draws	(Netherlands) Glenn Smits (Netherlands) Botic van de Zandschulp; 6–7^{(6–8)}, 6–4, [10–6]	(Belgium) Yannick Mertens (France) Hugo Voljacques	(France) Manuel Guinard (France) Antoine Escoffier	(Netherlands) Botic van de Zandschulp (France) Jurgen Briand (France) Grégoire Jacq (Russia) Alen Avidzba
September 17	Great Britain F5 Futures; Roehampton, United Kingdom; Hard $15,000; Singles and doubles draws	(United Kingdom) Jack Draper; 6–3, 6–2	(Sweden) Filip Bergevi	(United Kingdom) Mark Whitehouse (Switzerland) Antoine Bellier	(United Kingdom) Finn Bass (France) Alexis Gautier (United Kingdom) Andrew Watson (United Kingdom) Joshua Paris
September 17	Great Britain F5 Futures; Roehampton, United Kingdom; Hard $15,000; Singles and doubles draws	(Switzerland) Antoine Bellier (France) Baptiste Crepatte; 7–6^{(7–5)}, 6–7^{(2–7)}, [10–5]	(United Kingdom) James Story (United Kingdom) Connor Thomson	(United Kingdom) Mark Whitehouse (Switzerland) Antoine Bellier	(United Kingdom) Finn Bass (France) Alexis Gautier (United Kingdom) Andrew Watson (United Kingdom) Joshua Paris
September 17	Kazakhstan F7 Futures; Shymkent, Kazakhstan; Clay $15,000; Singles and doubles draws	(Russia) Andrey Chepelev; 6–4, 6–3	(Netherlands) Colin van Beem	(Estonia) Vladimir Ivanov (Russia) Shalva Dzhanashiya	(Russia) Denis Klok (Russia) Mikhail Fufygin (Russia) Bogdan Bobrov (Belarus) Mikalai Haliak
September 17	Kazakhstan F7 Futures; Shymkent, Kazakhstan; Clay $15,000; Singles and doubles draws	(Russia) Mikhail Fufygin (Estonia) Vladimir Ivanov; 6–3, 6–3	(Russia) Yan Bondarevskiy (Russia) Matvey Minin	(Estonia) Vladimir Ivanov (Russia) Shalva Dzhanashiya	(Russia) Denis Klok (Russia) Mikhail Fufygin (Russia) Bogdan Bobrov (Belarus) Mikalai Haliak
September 17	Portugal F17 Futures; Setúbal, Portugal; Hard $15,000; Singles and doubles draws	(Portugal) Fred Gil; 3–6, 6–4, 7–5	(Portugal) João Monteiro	(France) Maxime Tchoutakian (Portugal) Tiago Cação	(Spain) Rafael Izquierdo Luque (Portugal) Francisco Cabral (Germany) Niklas Schell (Brazil) Eduardo Dischinger
September 17	Portugal F17 Futures; Setúbal, Portugal; Hard $15,000; Singles and doubles draws	(Portugal) Fred Gil (Portugal) João Monteiro; 3–6, 6–3, [10–3]	(Germany) Patrick Mayer (Germany) Niklas Schell	(France) Maxime Tchoutakian (Portugal) Tiago Cação	(Spain) Rafael Izquierdo Luque (Portugal) Francisco Cabral (Germany) Niklas Schell (Brazil) Eduardo Dischinger
September 17	Tunisia F32 Futures; Monastir, Tunisia; Hard $15,000; Singles and doubles draws	(Germany) Christoph Negritu; 6–3, 4–6, 6–2	(Russia) Dimitriy Voronin	(Tunisia) Moez Echargui (Germany) Kai Wehnelt	(Russia) Petr Arkhipov (Italy) Luca Potenza (Benin) Alexis Klégou (Bulgaria) Vasko Mladenov
September 17	Tunisia F32 Futures; Monastir, Tunisia; Hard $15,000; Singles and doubles draws	(Tunisia) Anis Ghorbel (Bulgaria) Vasko Mladenov; 6–3, 6–3	(Peru) Alexander Merino (Germany) Christoph Negritu	(Tunisia) Moez Echargui (Germany) Kai Wehnelt	(Russia) Petr Arkhipov (Italy) Luca Potenza (Benin) Alexis Klégou (Bulgaria) Vasko Mladenov
September 17	Turkey F28 Futures; Antalya, Turkey; Clay $15,000; Singles and doubles draws	(France) Matthieu Perchicot; 6–2, 1–6, 7–6^{(10–8)}	(Italy) Riccardo Bonadio	(Spain) Jordi Samper Montaña (Germany) Paul Wörner	(Spain) Nikolás Sánchez Izquierdo (Germany) Jim Walder (Italy) Claudio Fortuna (Italy) Lorenzo Bocchi
September 17	Turkey F28 Futures; Antalya, Turkey; Clay $15,000; Singles and doubles draws	(Ukraine) Vadim Alekseenko (Iran) Shahin Khaledan; 6–3, 6–1	(Russia) Kirill Kivattsev (Russia) Dmitry Myagkov	(Spain) Jordi Samper Montaña (Germany) Paul Wörner	(Spain) Nikolás Sánchez Izquierdo (Germany) Jim Walder (Italy) Claudio Fortuna (Italy) Lorenzo Bocchi
September 17	USA F25 Futures; Laguna Niguel, United States; Hard $15,000; Singles and doubles draws	(United States) Brandon Nakashima; 6–4, 6–4	(France) Maxime Cressy	(Argentina) Alan Kohen (United States) Henry Craig	(United States) Michael Zhu (United States) Emilio Nava (United States) Martin Redlicki (Brazil) Alessandro-Damiano Ventre
September 17	USA F25 Futures; Laguna Niguel, United States; Hard $15,000; Singles and doubles draws	(United States) Nicolas Meister (United States) Martin Redlicki; 6–4, 3–6, [10–6]	(United States) Hunter Johnson (United States) Yates Johnson	(Argentina) Alan Kohen (United States) Henry Craig	(United States) Michael Zhu (United States) Emilio Nava (United States) Martin Redlicki (Brazil) Alessandro-Damiano Ventre
September 24	Australia F6 Futures; Darwin, Australia; Hard $25,000; Singles and doubles draws	(Japan) Yuta Shimizu; 7–6^{(8–6)}, 3–6, 6–4	(United Kingdom) Evan Hoyt	(Australia) Jacob Grills (Australia) Michael Look	(Australia) Lucas Vuradin (United Kingdom) Brydan Klein (Australia) Thomas Fancutt (Australia) Jeremy Beale
September 24	Australia F6 Futures; Darwin, Australia; Hard $25,000; Singles and doubles draws	(Australia) Jeremy Beale (Australia) Thomas Fancutt; 7–6^{(7–4)}, 6–3	(United Kingdom) Brydan Klein (Australia) Scott Puodziunas	(Australia) Jacob Grills (Australia) Michael Look	(Australia) Lucas Vuradin (United Kingdom) Brydan Klein (Australia) Thomas Fancutt (Australia) Jeremy Beale
September 24	Italy F29 Futures; Pula, Italy; Clay $25,000; Singles and doubles draws	(Switzerland) Sandro Ehrat; 7–5, 6–4	(Italy) Giovanni Fonio	(Italy) Davide Galoppini (Argentina) Mateo Nicolás Martínez	(Serbia) Miljan Zekić (Germany) Peter Torebko (Poland) Maciej Rajski (Peru) Juan Pablo Varillas
September 24	Italy F29 Futures; Pula, Italy; Clay $25,000; Singles and doubles draws	(Switzerland) Sandro Ehrat (Germany) Florian Fallert; 7–6^{(7–3)}, 6–3	(Italy) Davide Galoppini (Brazil) Bruno Sant'Anna	(Italy) Davide Galoppini (Argentina) Mateo Nicolás Martínez	(Serbia) Miljan Zekić (Germany) Peter Torebko (Poland) Maciej Rajski (Peru) Juan Pablo Varillas
September 24	Lebanon F1 Futures; Jounieh, Lebanon; Clay $25,000; Singles and doubles draws	(Spain) Jordi Samper Montaña; 6–3, 6–4	(France) Alexandre Müller	(France) Fabien Reboul (Spain) Guillermo Olaso	(France) Maxime Mora (Lebanon) Hady Habib (Italy) Nicolò Turchetti (Italy) Edoardo Eremin
September 24	Lebanon F1 Futures; Jounieh, Lebanon; Clay $25,000; Singles and doubles draws	(Brazil) Wilson Leite (Italy) Nicolò Turchetti; 6–3, 7–5	(Venezuela) Brandon Pérez (Switzerland) Vullnet Tashi	(France) Fabien Reboul (Spain) Guillermo Olaso	(France) Maxime Mora (Lebanon) Hady Habib (Italy) Nicolò Turchetti (Italy) Edoardo Eremin
September 24	Portugal F18 Futures; Oliveira de Azeméis, Portugal; Hard $25,000+H; Singles and doubles draws	(France) Gleb Sakharov; 7–6^{(9–7)}, 6–4	(Belgium) Yannick Mertens	(United Kingdom) Lloyd Glasspool (Portugal) Tiago Cação	(Belgium) Niels Desein (Portugal) Fred Gil (Portugal) João Monteiro (Czech Republic) Marek Gengel
September 24	Portugal F18 Futures; Oliveira de Azeméis, Portugal; Hard $25,000+H; Singles and doubles draws	(Portugal) Fred Gil (Guatemala) Wilfredo González; 5–7, 6–4, [10–5]	(Australia) Adam Taylor (Australia) Jason Taylor	(United Kingdom) Lloyd Glasspool (Portugal) Tiago Cação	(Belgium) Niels Desein (Portugal) Fred Gil (Portugal) João Monteiro (Czech Republic) Marek Gengel
September 24	Spain F29 Futures; Sabadell, Spain; Clay $25,000; Singles and doubles draws	(Spain) Álvaro López San Martín; 7–6^{(7–2)}, 6–3	(Chile) Gonzalo Lama	(Belgium) Omar Salman (France) Rayane Roumane	(Spain) Miguel Semmler (Spain) Javier Barranco Cosano (Spain) Eduard Esteve Lobato (Argentina) Franco Emanuel Egea
September 24	Spain F29 Futures; Sabadell, Spain; Clay $25,000; Singles and doubles draws	(Spain) Álvaro López San Martín (Spain) Sergio Martos Gornés; 6–2, 6–1	(Spain) Marc Giner (Spain) Jaume Pla Malfeito	(Belgium) Omar Salman (France) Rayane Roumane	(Spain) Miguel Semmler (Spain) Javier Barranco Cosano (Spain) Eduard Esteve Lobato (Argentina) Franco Emanuel Egea
September 24	Sweden F4 Futures; Stockholm, Sweden; Hard (indoor) $25,000; Singles and doubles draws	(Sweden) Markus Eriksson; 6–4, 6–2	(Belgium) Christopher Heyman	(Latvia) Mārtiņš Podžus (France) Yanais Laurent	(Germany) Johannes Härteis (United Kingdom) George Loffhagen (Czech Republic) Michal Konečný (Germany) Dominik Böhler
September 24	Sweden F4 Futures; Stockholm, Sweden; Hard (indoor) $25,000; Singles and doubles draws	(Sweden) Markus Eriksson (Sweden) Fred Simonsson; 2–6, 6–4, [10–8]	(Switzerland) Antoine Bellier (Germany) Johannes Härteis	(Latvia) Mārtiņš Podžus (France) Yanais Laurent	(Germany) Johannes Härteis (United Kingdom) George Loffhagen (Czech Republic) Michal Konečný (Germany) Dominik Böhler
September 24	Bolivia F3 Futures; La Paz, Bolivia; Clay $15,000; Singles and doubles draws	(Bolivia) Federico Zeballos; 6–2, 6–1	(Bolivia) Alejandro Mendoza	(Argentina) Maximiliano Estévez (Colombia) Andrés Urrea	(Argentina) Matías Zukas (Ukraine) Daniil Zarichanskyy (Argentina) Ignacio Monzón (Argentina) Fermín Tenti
September 24	Bolivia F3 Futures; La Paz, Bolivia; Clay $15,000; Singles and doubles draws	(Bolivia) Federico Zeballos (Argentina) Matías Zukas; 6–1, 6–1	(Argentina) Ignacio Monzón (Argentina) Fermín Tenti	(Argentina) Maximiliano Estévez (Colombia) Andrés Urrea	(Argentina) Matías Zukas (Ukraine) Daniil Zarichanskyy (Argentina) Ignacio Monzón (Argentina) Fermín Tenti
September 24	Egypt F20 Futures; Cairo, Egypt; Clay $15,000; Singles and doubles draws	(Austria) Alexander Erler; 6–4, 6–1	(Italy) Dante Gennaro	(Brazil) Jordan Correia (Italy) Simone Roncalli	(Italy) Luca Prevosto (Czech Republic) Petr Hájek (Italy) Alessandro Ceppellini (Belgium) Clément Geens
September 24	Egypt F20 Futures; Cairo, Egypt; Clay $15,000; Singles and doubles draws	(Italy) Dante Gennaro (Egypt) Sherif Sabry; 7–6^{(7–3)}, 6–4	(India) Tejas Chaukulkar (India) Vasisht Cheruku	(Brazil) Jordan Correia (Italy) Simone Roncalli	(Italy) Luca Prevosto (Czech Republic) Petr Hájek (Italy) Alessandro Ceppellini (Belgium) Clément Geens
September 24	France F19 Futures; Sarreguemines, France; Carpet (indoor) $15,000+H; Singles and doubles draws	(Germany) Elmar Ejupovic; 6–4, 7–5	(France) Albano Olivetti	(France) Hugo Schott (France) Ronan Joncour	(France) Paul Cayre (Belgium) Michael Geerts (Germany) Sami Reinwein (France) Hugo Voljacques
September 24	France F19 Futures; Sarreguemines, France; Carpet (indoor) $15,000+H; Singles and doubles draws	(France) Dan Added (France) Albano Olivetti; 7–6^{(7–5)}, 6–3	(Germany) Elmar Ejupovic (Belgium) Michael Geerts	(France) Hugo Schott (France) Ronan Joncour	(France) Paul Cayre (Belgium) Michael Geerts (Germany) Sami Reinwein (France) Hugo Voljacques
September 24	Great Britain F6 Futures; Barnstaple, United Kingdom; Hard (indoor) $15,000; Singles and doubles draws	(United Kingdom) Mark Whitehouse; 6–4, 3–6, 7–6^{(7–2)}	(United Kingdom) Aidan McHugh	(France) Manuel Guinard (United Kingdom) George Houghton	(United Kingdom) Ryan Peniston (United Kingdom) Neil Pauffley (United Kingdom) Michael Shaw (Italy) Francesco Vilardo
September 24	Great Britain F6 Futures; Barnstaple, United Kingdom; Hard (indoor) $15,000; Singles and doubles draws	(United Kingdom) Aidan McHugh (United Kingdom) James Story; 6–4, 6–1	(United Kingdom) Elliott Farmer (Australia) Cameron Green	(France) Manuel Guinard (United Kingdom) George Houghton	(United Kingdom) Ryan Peniston (United Kingdom) Neil Pauffley (United Kingdom) Michael Shaw (Italy) Francesco Vilardo
September 24	Kazakhstan F8 Futures; Shymkent, Kazakhstan; Clay $15,000; Singles and doubles draws	(Uzbekistan) Sanjar Fayziev; 6–2, 6–3	(Russia) Alexander Igoshin	(Russia) Andrey Chepelev (New Zealand) Rubin Statham	(Russia) Shalva Dzhanashiya (Italy) Francesco Bessire (Russia) Bogdan Bobrov (Kazakhstan) Sagadat Ayap
September 24	Kazakhstan F8 Futures; Shymkent, Kazakhstan; Clay $15,000; Singles and doubles draws	(Kazakhstan) Grigoriy Lomakin (Georgia (country)) George Tsivadze; 7–6^{(7–3)}, 6–3	(Belarus) Aliaksandr Bury (Belarus) Maksim Zubkou	(Russia) Andrey Chepelev (New Zealand) Rubin Statham	(Russia) Shalva Dzhanashiya (Italy) Francesco Bessire (Russia) Bogdan Bobrov (Kazakhstan) Sagadat Ayap
September 24	Peru F1 Futures; Trujillo, Peru; Clay $15,000; Singles and doubles draws	(Argentina) Gonzalo Villanueva; 6–0, 6–3	(Peru) Arklon Huertas del Pino	(Ecuador) Diego Hidalgo (Peru) Conner Huertas del Pino	(Peru) Duilio Beretta (Argentina) Nicolás Alberto Arreche (Brazil) Nicolas Santos (Argentina) Mariano Kestelboim
September 24	Peru F1 Futures; Trujillo, Peru; Clay $15,000; Singles and doubles draws	(Peru) Arklon Huertas del Pino (Peru) Conner Huertas del Pino; 6–4, 4–6, [10–4]	(Ecuador) Diego Hidalgo (Argentina) Mariano Kestelboim	(Ecuador) Diego Hidalgo (Peru) Conner Huertas del Pino	(Peru) Duilio Beretta (Argentina) Nicolás Alberto Arreche (Brazil) Nicolas Santos (Argentina) Mariano Kestelboim
September 24	Thailand F4 Futures; Hua Hin, Thailand; Hard $15,000; Singles and doubles draws	(Japan) Shintaro Imai; 6–2, 4–6, 6–3	(Japan) Kento Takeuchi	(India) Karunuday Singh (Germany) Pascal Meis	(Chinese Taipei) Huang Tsung-hao (Japan) Ryota Tanuma (India) Sidharth Rawat (Japan) Soichiro Moritani
September 24	Thailand F4 Futures; Hua Hin, Thailand; Hard $15,000; Singles and doubles draws	(Philippines) Francis Alcantara (India) Karunuday Singh; 6–3, 7–5	(Thailand) Nuttanon Kadchapanan (Thailand) Palaphoom Kovapitukted	(India) Karunuday Singh (Germany) Pascal Meis	(Chinese Taipei) Huang Tsung-hao (Japan) Ryota Tanuma (India) Sidharth Rawat (Japan) Soichiro Moritani
September 24	Tunisia F33 Futures; Monastir, Tunisia; Hard $15,000; Singles and doubles draws	(Germany) Robert Strombachs; 6–4, 7–6^{(7–5)}	(Russia) Dimitriy Voronin	(United States) Errol Smith (Germany) Kai Wehnelt	(Italy) Fausto Tabacco (Switzerland) Patrik Hartmeier (France) Florent Diep (Turkey) Altuğ Çelikbilek
September 24	Tunisia F33 Futures; Monastir, Tunisia; Hard $15,000; Singles and doubles draws	(Belarus) Ivan Liutarevich (Tunisia) Skander Mansouri; 6–3, 6–1	(Turkey) Altuğ Çelikbilek (France) Florent Diep	(United States) Errol Smith (Germany) Kai Wehnelt	(Italy) Fausto Tabacco (Switzerland) Patrik Hartmeier (France) Florent Diep (Turkey) Altuğ Çelikbilek
September 24	Turkey F29 Futures; Antalya, Turkey; Clay $15,000; Singles and doubles draws	(Italy) Riccardo Bonadio; 6–1, 6–2	(Russia) Kirill Kivattsev	(Germany) Sebastian Prechtel (Spain) Nikolás Sánchez Izquierdo	(Czech Republic) Tadeáš Paroulek (Germany) Jordi Walder (Austria) Moritz Thiem (Italy) Claudio Fortuna
September 24	Turkey F29 Futures; Antalya, Turkey; Clay $15,000; Singles and doubles draws	(Hungary) Péter Nagy (Belgium) Jeroen Vanneste; 6–4, 6–3	(Italy) Erik Crepaldi (Turkey) Koray Kırcı	(Germany) Sebastian Prechtel (Spain) Nikolás Sánchez Izquierdo	(Czech Republic) Tadeáš Paroulek (Germany) Jordi Walder (Austria) Moritz Thiem (Italy) Claudio Fortuna
September 24	USA F26 Futures; Fountain Valley, United States; Hard $15,000; Singles and doubles draws	(Japan) Takuto Niki; 6–3, 3–6, 6–3	(United States) Michael Shabaz	(France) Maxime Cressy (United States) Strong Kirchheimer	(United States) Alexios Halebian (Mexico) Lucas Gómez (Argentina) Alan Kohen (United States) Paul Oosterbaan
September 24	USA F26 Futures; Fountain Valley, United States; Hard $15,000; Singles and doubles draws	(Moldova) Alexander Cozbinov (France) Maxime Cressy; 6–2, 6–2	(United States) Alec Adamson (United States) Conor Berg	(France) Maxime Cressy (United States) Strong Kirchheimer	(United States) Alexios Halebian (Mexico) Lucas Gómez (Argentina) Alan Kohen (United States) Paul Oosterbaan
