= 2022 Shymkent Challenger – Singles =

Singles
- 2022 Shymkent Challenger

Final
- Champion: (United States) Emilio Nava
- Runner-up: (Germany) Sebastian Fanselow
- Score: 6–4, 7–6^{(7–3)}

Events
Singles	Doubles
← 2019 ·	Shymkent Challenger	· 2022 →

Andrej Martin was the defending champion but chose not to defend his title.

Emilio Nava won the title after defeating Sebastian Fanselow 6–4, 7–6^{(7–3)} in the final.

== Seeds ==
1. (United States) Tennys Sandgren (first round)
2. (Turkey) Altuğ Çelikbilek (first round)
3. Alexander Shevchenko (second round)
4. (Ukraine) Illya Marchenko (second round)
5. (Spain) Nicolás Álvarez Varona (second round)
6. (Japan) Kaichi Uchida (first round)
7. Evgeny Karlovskiy (quarterfinals)
8. (Romania) Filip Jianu (first round)

== Draw ==
=== Key ===
- Q = Qualifier
- WC = Wild card
- LL = Lucky loser
- Alt = Alternate
- SE = Special exempt
- PR = Protected ranking
- ITF = ITF entry
- JE = Junior exempt
- w/o = Walkover
- r = Retired
- d = Defaulted
- SR = Special ranking

=== Finals ===
Semifinals
Alt	(United States) Emilio Nava	6	6
(United States) Ulises Blanch	3	2
(Turkey) Ergi Kırkın	6^{4}	4
Q	(Germany) Sebastian Fanselow	7^{7}	6

Final
Alt	(United States) Emilio Nava	6	7^{7}
Q	(Germany) Sebastian Fanselow	4	6^{3}

=== Top half ===
First round
1	(United States) T Sandgren	3	4
Alt	(United States) Em Nava	6	6
Q	(United States) E Zhu	6	3	6
(Uzbekistan) D Istomin	1	6	1
(Norway) V Durasovic	6	6
WC	(Kazakhstan) B Zhukayev	4	2
(Denmark) M Torpegaard	6	4	6
6	(Japan) K Uchida	3	6	3
3	A Shevchenko	6	6
Q	(Ukraine) Eric Vanshelboim	1	1
Q	Yan Bondarevskiy	6	6^{5}	5
Q	(Bulgaria) A Lazarov	4	7^{7}	7
(United States) U Blanch	7	7^{7}
(Israel) Y Oliel	5	6^{5}
WC	(Georgia (country)) A Metreveli	3	1
5	(Spain) N Álvarez Varona	6	6

Second round
Alt	(United States) Em Nava	6	6
Q	(United States) E Zhu	4	4
(Norway) V Durasovic	6	7^{7}
(Denmark) M Torpegaard	4	6^{2}
3	A Shevchenko	6	4	6^{3}
Q	(Bulgaria) A Lazarov	3	6	7^{7}
(United States) U Blanch	7	6^{2}	7^{7}
5	(Spain) N Álvarez Varona	5	7^{7}	6^{3}

Quarterfinals
Alt	(United States) Em Nava	6	6
(Norway) V Durasovic	1	2
Q	(Bulgaria) A Lazarov	2^{r}
(United States) U Blanch	4

Semifinals
Alt	(United States) Em Nava	6	6
(United States) U Blanch	3	2

=== Bottom half ===
First round
7	E Karlovskiy	6	3	6
PR	(Italy) M Donati	3	6	3
(Kazakhstan) D Yevseyev	7	6
Q	(India) M Sasikumar	5	2
(Netherlands) R Haase	7	4	6^{2}
(Turkey) E Kırkın	5	6	7^{7}
Alt	(Brazil) G Décamps	3	1
4	(Ukraine) I Marchenko	6	6
8	(Romania) FC Jianu	3	5
Q	(Germany) S Fanselow	6	7
(Switzerland) A Bellier	6	6^{6}	7^{8}
Alt	E Tiurnev	3	7^{8}	6^{6}
(Romania) ND Ionel	6	6
WC	(Kazakhstan) G Lomakin	0	2
(Sweden) DN Mădăraș	6	4	6
2	(Turkey) A Çelikbilek	3	6	4

Second round
7	E Karlovskiy	3	6	6
(Kazakhstan) D Yevseyev	6	3	2
(Turkey) E Kırkın	5	6	6
4	(Ukraine) I Marchenko	7	1	3
Q	(Germany) S Fanselow	3	6	6
(Switzerland) A Bellier	6	1	2
(Romania) ND Ionel	4	3
(Sweden) DN Mădăraș	6	6

Quarterfinals
7	E Karlovskiy	3	6	3
(Turkey) E Kırkın	6	4	6
Q	(Germany) S Fanselow	6	7^{7}
(Sweden) DN Mădăraș	4	6^{5}

Semifinals
(Turkey) E Kırkın	6^{4}	4
Q	(Germany) S Fanselow	7^{7}	6
