= 2017 Shymkent Challenger – Doubles =

Doubles
- 2017 Shymkent Challenger

Final
- Champions: (Chile) Hans Podlipnik-Castillo (Belarus) Andrei Vasilevski
- Runners-up: (Belgium) Clément Geens (Argentina) Juan Pablo Paz
- Score: 6–4, 6–2

Events
Singles	Doubles
Shymkent Challenger	· 2018 →

This was the first edition of the tournament.

Hans Podlipnik-Castillo and Andrei Vasilevski won the title after defeating Clément Geens and Juan Pablo Paz 6–4, 6–2 in the final.

== Seeds ==
1. (Chile) Hans Podlipnik-Castillo / (Belarus) Andrei Vasilevski (champions)
2. (Russia) Mikhail Elgin / (Russia) Alexander Kudryavtsev (semifinals)
3. (Russia) Konstantin Kravchuk / (Ukraine) Denys Molchanov (semifinals)
4. (Belarus) Sergey Betov / (Belarus) Yaraslav Shyla (first round)

== Draw ==
=== Key ===
- Q = Qualifier
- WC = Wild card
- LL = Lucky loser
- Alt = Alternate
- SE = Special exempt
- PR = Protected ranking
- ITF = ITF entry
- JE = Junior exempt
- w/o = Walkover
- r = Retired
- d = Defaulted
- SR = Special ranking

First round
1	(Chile) H Podlipnik-Castillo (Belarus) A Vasilevski	6	6
(Russia) I Gakhov (Russia) A Vatutin	1	2
(Kazakhstan) A Golubev (Kazakhstan) A Nedovyesov	6	6
WC	(Kazakhstan) Sagadat Ayap (Kazakhstan) G Lomakin	1	2
3	(Russia) K Kravchuk (Ukraine) D Molchanov	6	7^{10}
(Uzbekistan) S Fayziev (Kazakhstan) T Khabibulin	2	6^{8}
PR	(Spain) J Martí (Spain) P Martínez	0	2
(Germany) Y Hanfmann (Germany) K Krawietz	6	6
(Italy) R Ghedin (Russia) D Matsukevich	6^{3}	7	[10]
(Serbia) N Milojević (Serbia) D Petrović	7^{7}	5	[6]
(Belgium) Clément Geens (Argentina) JP Paz	6	7
4	(Belarus) S Betov (Belarus) Y Shyla	4	5
WC	(Kazakhstan) A Kedryuk (Kazakhstan) D Yevseyev	7	6
WC	(Kazakhstan) R Khassanov (Uzbekistan) Shonigmatjon Shofayziyev	5	3
(Ukraine) V Manafov (Japan) T Matsui	6	5	[3]
2	(Russia) M Elgin (Russia) A Kudryavtsev	3	7	[10]

Quarterfinals
1	(Chile) H Podlipnik-Castillo (Belarus) A Vasilevski	6	7^{11}
(Kazakhstan) A Golubev (Kazakhstan) A Nedovyesov	2	6^{9}
3	(Russia) K Kravchuk (Ukraine) D Molchanov	5	6	[10]
(Germany) Y Hanfmann (Germany) K Krawietz	7	1	[5]
(Italy) R Ghedin (Russia) D Matsukevich	3	4
(Belgium) C Geens (Argentina) JP Paz	6	6
WC	(Kazakhstan) A Kedryuk (Kazakhstan) D Yevseyev	2	4
2	(Russia) M Elgin (Russia) A Kudryavtsev	6	6

Semifinals
1	(Chile) H Podlipnik-Castillo (Belarus) A Vasilevski	7^{7}	4	[10]
3	(Russia) K Kravchuk (Ukraine) D Molchanov	6^{3}	6	[8]
(Belgium) C Geens (Argentina) JP Paz	6	6
2	(Russia) M Elgin (Russia) A Kudryavtsev	3	0

Final
1	(Chile) H Podlipnik-Castillo (Belarus) A Vasilevski	6	6
(Belgium) C Geens (Argentina) JP Paz	4	2
