= 2017 Shymkent Challenger – Singles =

Singles
- 2017 Shymkent Challenger

Final
- Champion: (Lithuania) Ričardas Berankis
- Runner-up: (Germany) Yannick Hanfmann
- Score: 6–3, 6–2

Events
Singles	Doubles
Shymkent Challenger	· 2018 →

This was the first edition of the tournament.

Ričardas Berankis won the title after defeating Yannick Hanfmann 6–3, 6–2 in the final.

== Seeds ==
1. (Russia) Konstantin Kravchuk (first round)
2. (Serbia) Nikola Milojević (second round)
3. (Germany) Yannick Hanfmann (final)
4. (Kazakhstan) Aleksandr Nedovyesov (semifinals)
5. (Lithuania) Ričardas Berankis (champion)
6. (Lithuania) Laurynas Grigelis (first round)
7. (Australia) Christopher O'Connell (second round)
8. (Russia) Alexander Kudryavtsev (first round)

== Draw ==
=== Key ===
- Q = Qualifier
- WC = Wild card
- LL = Lucky loser
- Alt = Alternate
- SE = Special exempt
- PR = Protected ranking
- ITF = ITF entry
- JE = Junior exempt
- w/o = Walkover
- r = Retired
- d = Defaulted
- SR = Special ranking

=== Finals ===
Semifinals
5	(Lithuania) Ričardas Berankis	6	2	6
4	(Kazakhstan) Aleksandr Nedovyesov	2	6	2
3	(Germany) Yannick Hanfmann	6	6
(Spain) Carlos Taberner	4	4

Final
5	(Lithuania) Ričardas Berankis	6	6
3	(Germany) Yannick Hanfmann	3	2

=== Top half ===
First round
1	(Russia) K Kravchuk	3	3
(Belgium) Clément Geens	6	6
(Spain) Marc Giner	6	6
WC	(Estonia) K Raisma	3	4
WC	(Kazakhstan) R Khassanov	7	7
(Argentina) JP Paz	5	5
(Russia) A Vatutin	6	3	1
5	(Lithuania) R Berankis	2	6	6
4	(Kazakhstan) A Nedovyesov	6	6
(Republic of Ireland) S Barry	4	1
(Czech Republic) Marek Jaloviec	6^{5}	5
(Russia) A Karatsev	7^{7}	4^{r}
WC	(Slovakia) A Molčan	7	6
Q	(Russia) E Karlovskiy	5	2
Q	(Russia) E Tyurnev	6	6
6	(Lithuania) L Grigelis	4	4

Second round
(Belgium) C Geens	6	6
(Spain) M Giner	3	2
WC	(Kazakhstan) R Khassanov	2	6^{3}
5	(Lithuania) R Berankis	6	7^{7}
4	(Kazakhstan) A Nedovyesov	6	6
(Czech Republic) M Jaloviec	3	3
WC	(Slovakia) A Molčan	1	4
Q	(Russia) E Tyurnev	6	6

Quarterfinals
(Belgium) C Geens	1	2
5	(Lithuania) R Berankis	6	6
4	(Kazakhstan) A Nedovyesov	7	6
Q	(Russia) E Tyurnev	5	3

Semifinals
5	(Lithuania) R Berankis	6	2	6
4	(Kazakhstan) A Nedovyesov	2	6	2

=== Bottom half ===
First round
8	(Russia) A Kudryavtsev	6	0	1
(Russia) I Nedelko	4	6	6
(Serbia) D Petrović	7	6
(Germany) K Krawietz	5	1
Q	(Poland) A Kapaś	6	3	1
Q	(Russia) Ilya Vasilyev	3	6	6
(Ukraine) V Manafov	4	5
3	(Germany) Y Hanfmann	6	7
7	(Australia) C O'Connell	6	7^{8}
(Spain) P Martínez	3	6^{6}
WC	(Kazakhstan) A Golubev	6	6
(France) S Doumbia	4	3
(Spain) C Taberner	6	6
(Russia) I Gakhov	3	4
PR	(Spain) J Martí	3	3
2	(Serbia) N Milojević	6	6

Second round
(Russia) I Nedelko	6^{4}	4
(Serbia) D Petrović	7^{7}	6
Q	(Russia) I Vasilyev	3	2
3	(Germany) Y Hanfmann	6	6
7	(Australia) C O'Connell	4	2
WC	(Kazakhstan) A Golubev	6	6
(Spain) C Taberner	7	7^{7}
2	(Serbia) N Milojević	5	6^{0}

Quarterfinals
(Serbia) D Petrović	4	4
3	(Germany) Y Hanfmann	6	6
WC	(Kazakhstan) A Golubev	1	1
(Spain) C Taberner	6	6

Semifinals
3	(Germany) Y Hanfmann	6	6
(Spain) C Taberner	4	4
