= 2022 Shymkent Challenger II – Singles =

Singles
- 2022 Shymkent Challenger II

Final
- Champion: (Uzbekistan) Sergey Fomin
- Runner-up: (Netherlands) Robin Haase
- Score: 7–6^{(7–4)}, 6–3

Events
Singles	Doubles
- Shymkent Challenger

Emilio Nava was the defending champion but lost in the semifinals to Sergey Fomin.

Fomin won the title after defeating Robin Haase 7–6^{(7–4)}, 6–3 in the final.

== Seeds ==
1. Alexander Shevchenko (second round)
2. (Ukraine) Illya Marchenko (quarterfinals)
3. (Spain) Nicolás Álvarez Varona (second round)
4. (Japan) Kaichi Uchida (quarterfinals)
5. Evgeny Karlovskiy (quarterfinals)
6. (Romania) Filip Jianu (second round)
7. (Uzbekistan) Denis Istomin (first round)
8. (Switzerland) Antoine Bellier (first round)

== Draw ==
Key

- Q = Qualifier
- WC = Wild card
- LL = Lucky loser
- Alt = Alternate
- ITF = ITF entry
- PR = Protected ranking
- SR = Special ranking
- SE = Special exempt
- JE = Junior exempt
- JR = Junior Accelerator Programme entrant
- CO = College Accelerator Programme entrant
- NG = Next Gen Accelerator Program entrant
- w/o = Walkover
- r = Retired
- d = Defaulted

=== Finals ===
Semifinals
(United States) Emilio Nava	4	7	6^{5}
Q	(Uzbekistan) Sergey Fomin	6	5	7^{7}
(Netherlands) Robin Haase	7	6
Q	(United States) Evan Zhu	5	4

Final
Q	(Uzbekistan) Sergey Fomin	7^{7}	6
(Netherlands) Robin Haase	6^{4}	3

=== Top half ===
First round
1	A Shevchenko	6	6
(Italy) Edoardo Lavagno	4	2
(United States) Em Nava	6	6
(Israel) Y Oliel	4	2
(Norway) V Durasovic	3	6	3
Q	I Gakhov	6	3	6
Q	(India) A Kadhe	4	6	1
5	E Karlovskiy	6	4	6
4	(Japan) K Uchida	7	7^{7}
Q	(Ukraine) Eric Vanshelboim	5	6^{3}
(United States) U Blanch	3	2
(Kazakhstan) D Yevseyev	6	6
Q	(Uzbekistan) S Fomin	6	7^{7}
Alt	A Kachmazov	1	6^{3}
Alt	(Germany) S Fanselow	6	6
7	(Uzbekistan) D Istomin	1	4

Second round
1	A Shevchenko	3	4
(United States) Em Nava	6	6
Q	I Gakhov	6^{5}	5
5	E Karlovskiy	7^{7}	7
4	(Japan) K Uchida	7^{7}	3	6
(Kazakhstan) D Yevseyev	6^{5}	6	4
Q	(Uzbekistan) S Fomin	6	6
Alt	(Germany) S Fanselow	3	3

Quarterfinals
(United States) Em Nava	7	6
5	E Karlovskiy	5	3
4	(Japan) K Uchida	7	3	4
Q	(Uzbekistan) S Fomin	5	6	6

Semifinals
(United States) Em Nava	4	7	6^{5}
Q	(Uzbekistan) S Fomin	6	5	7^{7}

=== Bottom half ===
First round
6	(Romania) FC Jianu	6	6
WC	(Kazakhstan) Dostanbek Tashbulatov	2	2
(Netherlands) R Haase	7^{7}	3
E Tiurnev	6^{3}	1^{r}
(Romania) ND Ionel	6	0	6
(Turkey) E Kırkın	2	6	4
(Sweden) DN Mădăraș	4	0
3	(Spain) N Álvarez Varona	6	6
8	(Switzerland) A Bellier	3	4
Q	(United States) E Zhu	6	6
Q	(India) M Sasikumar	1	6^{11}
WC	(Kazakhstan) B Zhukayev	6	7^{13}
(Denmark) M Torpegaard	2	4
(Brazil) G Décamps	6	6
WC	(Georgia (country)) S Purtseladze	4	2
2	(Ukraine) I Marchenko	6	6

Second round
6	(Romania) FC Jianu	3	6	3
(Netherlands) R Haase	6	3	6
(Romania) ND Ionel	6	4	6
3	(Spain) N Álvarez Varona	2	6	2
Q	(United States) E Zhu	6	6
WC	(Kazakhstan) B Zhukayev	2	3
(Brazil) G Décamps	1	1
2	(Ukraine) I Marchenko	6	6

Quarterfinals
(Netherlands) R Haase	3	7	6
(Romania) ND Ionel	6	5	2
Q	(United States) E Zhu	6	7^{7}
2	(Ukraine) I Marchenko	3	6^{2}

Semifinals
(Netherlands) R Haase	7	6
Q	(United States) E Zhu	5	4
