= 2017 Shymkent Challenger =

- Date: 22–27 May
- Edition: 1st
- Surface: Clay
- Location: Shymkent, Kazakhstan

Champions

Singles
- (Lithuania) Ričardas Berankis

Doubles
- (Chile) Hans Podlipnik Castillo / (Belarus) Andrei Vasilevski
Shymkent Challenger	· 2018 →

The 2017 Shymkent Challenger was a professional tennis tournament played on clay courts. It was the first edition of the tournament which was part of the 2017 ATP Challenger Tour. It took place in Shymkent, Kazakhstan between 22 and 27 May 2017.

== Singles main-draw entrants ==
=== Seeds ===
Country	Player	Rank^{1}	Seed
RUS	Konstantin Kravchuk	129	1
SRB	Nikola Milojević	193	2
GER	Yannick Hanfmann	219	3
KAZ	Aleksandr Nedovyesov	236	4
LTU	Ričardas Berankis	243	5
LTU	Laurynas Grigelis	245	6
AUS	Christopher O'Connell	251	7
RUS	Alexander Kudryavtsev	263	8

- ^{1} Rankings are as of 15 May 2017.

=== Other entrants ===
The following players received wildcards into the singles main draw:

- (Kazakhstan) Andrey Golubev
- (Kazakhstan) Roman Khassanov
- (Slovakia) Alex Molčan
- (Estonia) Kenneth Raisma

The following player received entry into the singles main draw using a protected ranking:

- (Spain) Javier Martí

The following players received entry from the qualifying draw:

- (Poland) Andriej Kapaś
- (Russia) Evgeny Karlovskiy
- (Russia) Evgenii Tiurnev
- (Russia) Ilya Vasilyev

== Champions ==
=== Singles ===
- (Lithuania) Ričardas Berankis def. (Germany) Yannick Hanfmann 6–3, 6–2.

=== Doubles ===
- (Chile) Hans Podlipnik Castillo / (Belarus) Andrei Vasilevski def. (Belgium) Clément Geens / (Argentina) Juan Pablo Paz 6–4, 6–2.
