= 2022 Shymkent Challenger – Doubles =

Doubles
- 2022 Shymkent Challenger

Final
- Champions: (Switzerland) Antoine Bellier (Brazil) Gabriel Décamps
- Runners-up: (Germany) Sebastian Fanselow (Japan) Kaichi Uchida
- Score: 7–6^{(7–3)}, 6–3

Events
Singles	Doubles
← 2019 ·	Shymkent Challenger	· 2022 →

Nikola Ćaćić and Yang Tsung-hua were the defending champions but chose not to defend their title.

Antoine Bellier and Gabriel Décamps won the title after defeating Sebastian Fanselow and Kaichi Uchida 7–6^{(7–3)}, 6–3 in the final.

== Seeds ==
1. (Netherlands) Robin Haase / (Greece) Petros Tsitsipas (first round)
2. (India) Arjun Kadhe / (Ukraine) Vladyslav Manafov (quarterfinals)
3. (Uzbekistan) Sanjar Fayziev / (Greece) Markos Kalovelonis (quarterfinals)
4. Yan Bondarevskiy / (Kazakhstan) Grigoriy Lomakin (quarterfinals)

== Draw ==
=== Key ===
- Q = Qualifier
- WC = Wild card
- LL = Lucky loser
- Alt = Alternate
- ITF = ITF entry
- PR = Protected ranking
- SR = Special ranking
- SE = Special exempt
- JE = Junior exempt
- JR = Junior Accelerator Programme entrant
- CO = College Accelerator Programme entrant
- NG = Next Gen Accelerator Program entrant
- w/o = Walkover
- r = Retired
- d = Defaulted

First round
1	(Netherlands) R Haase (Greece) Pe Tsitsipas	4	6	[6]
Alt	(Romania) ND Ionel (Ukraine) Eric Vanshelboim	6	3	[10]
(Germany) S Fanselow (Japan) K Uchida	6	6
(Spain) N Álvarez Varona (Romania) FC Jianu	4	3
4	Yan Bondarevskiy (Kazakhstan) G Lomakin	6	3	[10]
B Bobrov (Uzbekistan) D Istomin	2	6	[5]
(Norway) V Durasovic; I Gakhov	6	7^{8}
(Turkey) E Kırkın (Israel) Y Oliel	1	6^{6}
(Switzerland) A Bellier (Brazil) G Décamps	6	3	[10]
(United States) U Blanch (United States) Em Nava	2	6	[5]
E Karlovskiy; E Tiurnev	4	6	[8]
3	(Uzbekistan) S Fayziev (Greece) M Kalovelonis	6	2	[10]
WC	(Kazakhstan) Timur Maulenov (Kazakhstan) Dostanbek Tashbulatov	4	1
A Shevchenko (Kazakhstan) D Yevseyev	6	6
WC	A Kachmazov (Kazakhstan) B Zhukayev	1	2
2	(India) A Kadhe (Ukraine) V Manafov	6	6

Quarterfinals
Alt	(Romania) ND Ionel (Ukraine) E Vanshelboim	6^{2}	6^{11}
(Germany) S Fanselow (Japan) K Uchida	7^{7}	7^{13}
4	Y Bondarevskiy (Kazakhstan) G Lomakin	4	3
(Norway) V Durasovic; I Gakhov	6	6
(Switzerland) A Bellier (Brazil) G Décamps	6	6
3	(Uzbekistan) S Fayziev (Greece) M Kalovelonis	2	3
A Shevchenko (Kazakhstan) D Yevseyev	6	3	[11]
2	(India) A Kadhe (Ukraine) V Manafov	4	6	[9]

Semifinals
(Germany) S Fanselow (Japan) K Uchida	3	6	[10]
(Norway) V Durasovic; I Gakhov	6	3	[7]
(Switzerland) A Bellier (Brazil) G Décamps	7	6^{5}	[10]
A Shevchenko (Kazakhstan) D Yevseyev	5	7^{7}	[6]

Final
(Germany) S Fanselow (Japan) K Uchida	6^{3}	3
(Switzerland) A Bellier (Brazil) G Décamps	7^{7}	6
