= 2022 Shymkent Challenger =

- Date: 9–14 May
- Edition: 5th
- Surface: Clay
- Location: Shymkent, Kazakhstan

Champions

Singles
- (United States) Emilio Nava

Doubles
- (Switzerland) Antoine Bellier / (Brazil) Gabriel Décamps
← 2019 ·	Shymkent Challenger	· 2022 →

The 2022 Shymkent Challenger was a professional tennis tournament played on clay courts. It was the fifth edition of the tournament which was part of the 2022 ATP Challenger Tour. It took place in Shymkent, Kazakhstan between 9 and 14 May 2022.

== Singles main-draw entrants ==
=== Seeds ===
Country	Player	Rank^{1}	Seed
USA	Tennys Sandgren	179	1
TUR	Altuğ Çelikbilek	184	2
	Alexander Shevchenko	248	3
UKR	Illya Marchenko	251	4
ESP	Nicolás Álvarez Varona	278	5
JPN	Kaichi Uchida	282	6
	Evgeny Karlovskiy	286	7
ROU	Filip Jianu	298	8

- ^{1} Rankings are as of 2 May 2022.

=== Other entrants ===
The following players received wildcards into the singles main draw:

- (Kazakhstan) Grigoriy Lomakin
- (Georgia (country)) Aleksandre Metreveli
- (Kazakhstan) Beibit Zhukayev

The following players received entry into the singles main draw using protected rankings:

- (Belgium) ~~Joris De Loore~~
- (Italy) Matteo Donati

The following players received entry into the singles main draw as alternates:

- (Brazil) Gabriel Décamps
- (United States) Emilio Nava
- Evgenii Tiurnev

The following players received entry from the qualifying draw:

- Yan Bondarevskiy
- (Germany) Sebastian Fanselow
- (Bulgaria) Alexandar Lazarov
- (India) Mukund Sasikumar
- (Ukraine) Eric Vanshelboim
- (United States) Evan Zhu

== Champions ==
=== Singles ===
- (United States) Emilio Nava def. (Germany) Sebastian Fanselow 6–4, 7–6^{(7–3)}.

=== Doubles ===
- (Switzerland) Antoine Bellier / (Brazil) Gabriel Décamps def. (Germany) Sebastian Fanselow / (Japan) Kaichi Uchida 7–6^{(7–3)}, 6–3.
