= 2019 Shymkent Challenger – Doubles =

Doubles
- 2019 Shymkent Challenger

Final
- Champions: (Austria) Jurij Rodionov (Finland) Emil Ruusuvuori
- Runners-up: (Portugal) Gonçalo Oliveira (Belarus) Andrei Vasilevski
- Score: 6–4, 3–6, [10–8]

Events
Singles	Doubles
- Shymkent Challenger

Lorenzo Giustino and Gonçalo Oliveira were the defending champions but only Oliveira chose to defend his title, partnering Andrei Vasilevski. Oliveira lost in the final to Jurij Rodionov and Emil Ruusuvuori.

Rodionov and Ruusuvuori won the title after defeating Oliveira and Vasilevski 6–4, 3–6, [10–8] in the final.

== Seeds ==
1. (Portugal) Gonçalo Oliveira / (Belarus) Andrei Vasilevski (final)
2. (Kazakhstan) Timur Khabibulin / (Ukraine) Vladyslav Manafov (semifinals)
3. (Russia) Ivan Gakhov / (Russia) Alexander Pavlioutchenkov (quarterfinals)
4. (India) Arjun Kadhe / (Kazakhstan) Denis Yevseyev (semifinals)

== Draw ==
Key

- Q = Qualifier
- WC = Wild card
- LL = Lucky loser
- Alt = Alternate
- ITF = ITF entry
- PR = Protected ranking
- SR = Special ranking
- SE = Special exempt
- JE = Junior exempt
- JR = Junior Accelerator Programme entrant
- CO = College Accelerator Programme entrant
- NG = Next Gen Accelerator Program entrant
- w/o = Walkover
- r = Retired
- d = Defaulted

First round
1	(Portugal) G Oliveira (Belarus) A Vasilevski	6	6
ITF	(Egypt) K-M Maamoun (Russia) A Zhurbin	4	4
WC	(Russia) T Gabashvili (Kazakhstan) G Lomakin	7	3	[12]
(Belarus) U Ignatik (Russia) R Safiullin	5	6	[10]
4	(India) A Kadhe (Kazakhstan) D Yevseyev	7	6
(Norway) V Durasovic (Russia) P Kotov	5	1
WC	(Kazakhstan) Sagadat Ayap (Kazakhstan) D Popko	4	4
WC	(Kazakhstan) A Golubev (Kazakhstan) A Nedovyesov	6	6
(Chile) MT Barrios Vera (Dominican Republic) R Cid Subervi	3	1
(Austria) J Rodionov (Finland) E Ruusuvuori	6	6
ITF	(Netherlands) G Brouwer (Russia) K Kravchuk	4	4
3	(Russia) I Gakhov (Russia) A Pavlioutchenkov	6	6
(Australia) Jacob Grills (Australia) A Vukic	7^{7}	6
(United Kingdom) J Clarke (Austria) G Melzer	6^{5}	4
(Uzbekistan) S Fayziev (Uzbekistan) K Sultanov	5	3
2	(Kazakhstan) T Khabibulin (Ukraine) V Manafov	7	6

Quarterfinals
1	(Portugal) G Oliveira (Belarus) A Vasilevski	6	6
WC	(Russia) T Gabashvili (Kazakhstan) G Lomakin	1	3
4	(India) A Kadhe (Kazakhstan) D Yevseyev	4	6	[10]
WC	(Kazakhstan) A Golubev (Kazakhstan) A Nedovyesov	6	3	[7]
(Austria) J Rodionov (Finland) E Ruusuvuori	6	7^{7}
3	(Russia) I Gakhov (Russia) A Pavlioutchenkov	4	6^{3}
(Australia) J Grills (Australia) A Vukic	5	4
2	(Kazakhstan) T Khabibulin (Ukraine) V Manafov	7	6

Semifinals
1	(Portugal) G Oliveira (Belarus) A Vasilevski	6	6
4	(India) A Kadhe (Kazakhstan) D Yevseyev	4	4
(Austria) J Rodionov (Finland) E Ruusuvuori	6^{3}	7	[12]
2	(Kazakhstan) T Khabibulin (Ukraine) V Manafov	7^{7}	5	[10]

Final
1	(Portugal) G Oliveira (Belarus) A Vasilevski	4	6	[8]
(Austria) J Rodionov (Finland) E Ruusuvuori	6	3	[10]
