= 2019 Shymkent Challenger II – Singles =

Singles
- 2019 Shymkent Challenger II

Final
- Champion: (Slovakia) Andrej Martin
- Runner-up: (Italy) Stefano Travaglia
- Score: 6–4, 6–4

Events
Singles	Doubles
- Shymkent Challenger

Andrej Martin was the defending champion and successfully defended his title, defeating Stefano Travaglia 6–4, 6–4 in the final.

== Seeds ==
All seeds receive a bye into the second round.

1. (Tunisia) Malek Jaziri (third round)
2. (Italy) Stefano Travaglia (final)
3. (Slovakia) Andrej Martin (champion)
4. (Italy) Lorenzo Giustino (quarterfinals)
5. (Germany) Yannick Hanfmann (withdrew)
6. (Australia) Marc Polmans (third round)
7. (Kazakhstan) Aleksandr Nedovyesov (quarterfinals)
8. (Serbia) Peđa Krstin (third round)
9. (Russia) Evgeny Karlovskiy (withdrew)
10. (Australia) Akira Santillan (second round)
11. (Argentina) Federico Coria (semifinals)
12. (Canada) Steven Diez (third round)
13. (Japan) Kaichi Uchida (third round)
14. (Portugal) Gonçalo Oliveira (third round)
15. (Spain) Daniel Gimeno Traver (quarterfinals)
16. (Australia) Max Purcell (second round)

== Draw ==
Key

- Q = Qualifier
- WC = Wild card
- LL = Lucky loser
- Alt = Alternate
- ITF = ITF entry
- PR = Protected ranking
- SR = Special ranking
- SE = Special exempt
- JE = Junior exempt
- JR = Junior Accelerator Programme entrant
- CO = College Accelerator Programme entrant
- NG = Next Gen Accelerator Program entrant
- w/o = Walkover
- r = Retired
- d = Defaulted

=== Finals ===
Quarterfinals
15	(Spain) Daniel Gimeno Traver	7^{7}	3	1
Q	(Chile) Alejandro Tabilo	6^{4}	6	6
3	(Slovakia) Andrej Martin	6	6
7	(Kazakhstan) Aleksandr Nedovyesov	2	3
11	(Argentina) Federico Coria	6^{5}	6	6
4	(Italy) Lorenzo Giustino	7^{7}	3	1
(Spain) Nicola Kuhn	2	2
2	(Italy) Stefano Travaglia	6	6

Semifinals
Q	(Chile) Alejandro Tabilo	7	6^{4}	2
3	(Slovakia) Andrej Martin	5	7^{7}	6
11	(Argentina) Federico Coria	2	6^{2}
2	(Italy) Stefano Travaglia	6	7^{7}

Final
3	(Slovakia) Andrej Martin	6	6
2	(Italy) Stefano Travaglia	4	4

=== Top half ===
==== Section 1 ====
First round
(Argentina) A Collarini	6	6
WC	(Kazakhstan) T Skatov	3	4
ITF	(Uzbekistan) S Fayziev	2	2
(United States) E King	6	6
(Russia) P Kotov	4	2^{r}
Q	(Chile) A Tabilo	6	4
ITF	(Tunisia) S Mansouri	4	2
Q	(United States) S Korda	6	6

Second round
1	(Tunisia) M Jaziri	6	6
(Argentina) A Collarini	4	3
(United States) E King	6	1	5
15	(Spain) D Gimeno Traver	3	6	7
LL	(Bulgaria) A Lazarov	2	3
Q	(Chile) A Tabilo	6	6
Q	(United States) S Korda	6	3	2
6	(Australia) M Polmans	1	6	6

Third round
1	(Tunisia) M Jaziri	1	5
15	(Spain) D Gimeno Traver	6	7
Q	(Chile) A Tabilo	6	6
6	(Australia) M Polmans	3	0

Quarterfinals
15	(Spain) D Gimeno Traver	7^{7}	3	1
Q	(Chile) A Tabilo	6^{4}	6	6

==== Section 2 ====
First round
(Kazakhstan) D Yevseyev	1	1
(Chinese Taipei) T-l Wu	6	6
ITF	(Russia) K Kravchuk	3	6	1
(Croatia) N Serdarušić	6	1	6
Alt	(China) D Wu	2	3
WC	(Kazakhstan) A Golubev	6	6
WC	(Turkey) E Kırkın	6	2	5
(France) G Sakharov	2	6	7

Second round
3	(Slovakia) A Martin	7	6
(Chinese Taipei) T-l Wu	5	1
(Croatia) N Serdarušić	6^{3}	6	6
16	(Australia) M Purcell	7^{7}	4	4
12	(Canada) S Diez	6	1	6
WC	(Kazakhstan) A Golubev	3	6	3
(France) G Sakharov	7	1	6^{6}
7	(Kazakhstan) A Nedovyesov	5	6	7^{8}

Third round
3	(Slovakia) A Martin	6	6
(Croatia) N Serdarušić	3	4
12	(Canada) S Diez	6	3	3
7	(Kazakhstan) A Nedovyesov	1	6	6

Quarterfinals
3	(Slovakia) A Martin	6	6
7	(Kazakhstan) A Nedovyesov	2	3

=== Bottom half ===
==== Section 3 ====
First round
(Australia) A Vukic	6	6
WC	(Kazakhstan) Dostanbek Tashbulatov	3	1
(Spain) M Vilella Martínez	6	2	5
(Bosnia and Herzegovina) T Brkić	1	6	7
WC	(Uzbekistan) S Fomin	2	6	6^{2}
(France) A Müller	6	2	7^{7}
Alt	(Croatia) A Pavić	4	6	5
ITF	(France) Baptiste Crepatte	6	0	7

Second round
8	(Serbia) P Krstin	6	6
(Australia) A Vukic	3	4
(Bosnia and Herzegovina) T Brkić	3	7^{7}	1
11	(Argentina) F Coria	6	6^{4}	6
13	(Japan) K Uchida	6	7
(France) A Müller	4	5
ITF	(France) B Crepatte	2	2
4	(Italy) L Giustino	6	6

Third round
8	(Serbia) P Krstin	4	1
11	(Argentina) F Coria	6	6
13	(Japan) K Uchida	3	2
4	(Italy) L Giustino	6	6

Quarterfinals
11	(Argentina) F Coria	6^{5}	6	6
4	(Italy) L Giustino	7^{7}	3	1

==== Section 4 ====
First round
(Chinese Taipei) T-h Yang	4	0
ITF	(Italy) R Bonadio	6	6
(Russia) R Safiullin	6	2	2
(Spain) N Kuhn	3	6	6
(Dominican Republic) R Cid Subervi	6	4	4
(Chile) MT Barrios Vera	4	6	6
(Switzerland) M-A Hüsler	6	6
LL	(Kazakhstan) G Lomakin	2	4

Second round
Alt	(Ukraine) V Manafov	4	4
ITF	(Italy) R Bonadio	6	6
(Spain) N Kuhn	1	7	6
10	(Australia) A Santillan	6	5	3
14	(Portugal) G Oliveira	6	7
(Chile) MT Barrios Vera	3	5
(Switzerland) M-A Hüsler	6^{2}	4
2	(Italy) S Travaglia	7^{7}	6

Third round
ITF	(Italy) R Bonadio	6	4	4
(Spain) N Kuhn	4	6	6
14	(Portugal) G Oliveira	3	3
2	(Italy) S Travaglia	6	6

Quarterfinals
(Spain) N Kuhn	2	2
2	(Italy) S Travaglia	6	6
