= 2019 Shymkent Challenger – Singles =

Singles
- 2019 Shymkent Challenger

Final
- Champion: (Slovakia) Andrej Martin
- Runner-up: (Kazakhstan) Dmitry Popko
- Score: 5–7, 6–4, 6–4

Events
Singles	Doubles
- Shymkent Challenger

Yannick Hanfmann was the defending champion but chose not to defend his title.

Andrej Martin won the title after defeating Dmitry Popko 5–7, 6–4, 6–4 in the final.

== Seeds ==
All seeds receive a bye into the second round.

1. (Belarus) Egor Gerasimov (semifinals)
2. (United Kingdom) Jay Clarke (quarterfinals)
3. (Austria) Jurij Rodionov (third round)
4. (Slovakia) Andrej Martin (champion)
5. (Kazakhstan) Aleksandr Nedovyesov (semifinals, retired)
6. (Belarus) Uladzimir Ignatik (second round)
7. (Portugal) Gonçalo Oliveira (second round)
8. (Austria) Gerald Melzer (third round)
9. (Russia) Roman Safiullin (second round)
10. (Dominican Republic) Roberto Cid Subervi (quarterfinals)
11. (Russia) Pavel Kotov (third round)
12. (Chile) Marcelo Tomás Barrios Vera (quarterfinals)
13. (Kazakhstan) Denis Yevseyev (second round)
14. (Australia) Aleksandar Vukic (third round)
15. (Brazil) Thiago Seyboth Wild (second round)
16. (Norway) Viktor Durasovic (second round)

== Draw ==
Key

- Q = Qualifier
- WC = Wild card
- LL = Lucky loser
- Alt = Alternate
- ITF = ITF entry
- PR = Protected ranking
- SR = Special ranking
- SE = Special exempt
- JE = Junior exempt
- JR = Junior Accelerator Programme entrant
- CO = College Accelerator Programme entrant
- NG = Next Gen Accelerator Program entrant
- w/o = Walkover
- r = Retired
- d = Defaulted

=== Finals ===
Quarterfinals
1	(Belarus) Egor Gerasimov	7	4	6
10	(Dominican Republic) Roberto Cid Subervi	5	6	1
4	(Slovakia) Andrej Martin	6	4	6
12	(Chile) Marcelo Tomás Barrios Vera	3	6	3
ITF	(Uzbekistan) Sanjar Fayziev	4	0
WC	(Kazakhstan) Dmitry Popko	6	6
5	(Kazakhstan) Aleksandr Nedovyesov	2	7	6
2	(United Kingdom) Jay Clarke	6	5	1

Semifinals
1	(Belarus) Egor Gerasimov	4	0
4	(Slovakia) Andrej Martin	6	6
WC	(Kazakhstan) Dmitry Popko	2	6	3
5	(Kazakhstan) Aleksandr Nedovyesov	6	1	2^{r}

Final
4	(Slovakia) Andrej Martin	5	6	6
WC	(Kazakhstan) Dmitry Popko	7	4	4

=== Top half ===
==== Section 1 ====
First round
(Uzbekistan) K Sultanov	7	4	2
(Hungary) Z Piros	5	6	6
ITF	(Russia) K Kravchuk	6	6^{3}	7^{7}
Q	(Kazakhstan) T Khabibulin	2	7^{7}	6^{5}
ITF	(Egypt) K-M Maamoun	6	6^{4}	6
(Uzbekistan) S Fomin	1	7^{7}	0
(Russia) S Danilov	4	0
(Russia) I Gakhov	6	6

Second round
1	(Belarus) E Gerasimov	6^{4}	6	6
(Hungary) Z Piros	7^{7}	4	2
ITF	(Russia) K Kravchuk	1^{r}
14	(Australia) A Vukic	2
10	(Dominican Republic) R Cid Subervi	1	6	6
ITF	(Egypt) K-M Maamoun	6	3	2
(Russia) I Gakhov	5	6	6
7	(Portugal) G Oliveira	7	3	4

Third round
1	(Belarus) E Gerasimov	6	6^{3}	6
14	(Australia) A Vukic	4	7^{7}	4
10	(Dominican Republic) R Cid Subervi	7^{7}	7^{7}
(Russia) I Gakhov	6^{5}	6^{5}

Quarterfinals
1	(Belarus) E Gerasimov	7	4	6
10	(Dominican Republic) R Cid Subervi	5	6	1

==== Section 2 ====
First round
(Germany) J Lenz	3	4
(Australia) Jacob Grills	6	6
ITF	(Russia) A Zhurbin	6	6
(Russia) E Tiurnev	1	2
(Australia) H Bourchier	2	6	7
(France) A Escoffier	6	2	5
WC	(Kazakhstan) G Lomakin	5	6^{2}
(Israel) E Leshem	7	7^{7}

Second round
4	(Slovakia) A Martin	6	6
(Australia) J Grills	0	2
ITF	(Russia) A Zhurbin	7	6
13	(Kazakhstan) D Yevseyev	5	0
12	(Chile) MT Barrios Vera	3	6	7^{7}
(Australia) H Bourchier	6	3	6^{4}
(Israel) E Leshem	2	1
8	(Austria) G Melzer	6	6

Third round
4	(Slovakia) A Martin	4	6	6
ITF	(Russia) A Zhurbin	6	3	3
12	(Chile) MT Barrios Vera	6	6
8	(Austria) G Melzer	4	1

Quarterfinals
4	(Slovakia) A Martin	6	4	6
12	(Chile) MT Barrios Vera	3	6	3

=== Bottom half ===
==== Section 3 ====
First round
(Ukraine) I Marchenko	6	6
WC	(Kazakhstan) Dostanbek Tashbulatov	2	3
(India) A Kadhe	7	5	4
ITF	(Uzbekistan) S Fayziev	5	7	6
WC	(Kazakhstan) D Popko	6	6
(Finland) E Ruusuvuori	1	3
Alt	(Russia) Anton Chekhov	1	1
WC	(Kazakhstan) A Golubev	6	6

Second round
6	(Belarus) U Ignatik	6	3	4
(Ukraine) I Marchenko	3	6	6
ITF	(Uzbekistan) S Fayziev	6	7
9	(Russia) R Safiullin	1	5
15	(Brazil) T Seyboth Wild	2	4
WC	(Kazakhstan) D Popko	6	6
WC	(Kazakhstan) A Golubev	4	3
3	(Austria) J Rodionov	6	6

Third round
(Ukraine) I Marchenko	2	6	4
ITF	(Uzbekistan) S Fayziev	6	3	6
WC	(Kazakhstan) D Popko	6^{6}	6	6
3	(Austria) J Rodionov	7^{8}	0	4

Quarterfinals
ITF	(Uzbekistan) S Fayziev	4	0
WC	(Kazakhstan) D Popko	6	6

==== Section 4 ====
First round
Alt	(Kazakhstan) T Skatov	6	6
(Israel) B Patael	1	4
WC	(Russia) Dimitriy Voronin	7	4	5
(Russia) T Gabashvili	5	6	2^{r}
(Germany) Tobias Simon	3	6	7
ITF	(Netherlands) G Brouwer	6	4	5
(Spain) R Ojeda Lara	7	6
Q	(Ukraine) V Manafov	5	2

Second round
5	(Kazakhstan) A Nedovyesov	6	6
Alt	(Kazakhstan) T Skatov	3	3
WC	(Russia) D Voronin	2	2
11	(Russia) P Kotov	6	6
16	(Norway) V Durasovic	6^{2}	5
(Germany) T Simon	7^{7}	7
(Spain) R Ojeda Lara	0^{r}
2	(United Kingdom) J Clarke	5

Third round
5	(Kazakhstan) A Nedovyesov	6	5	7
11	(Russia) P Kotov	4	7	5
(Germany) T Simon	2	7	6^{7}
2	(United Kingdom) J Clarke	6	5	7^{9}

Quarterfinals
5	(Kazakhstan) A Nedovyesov	2	7	6
2	(United Kingdom) J Clarke	6	5	1
