= 2026 Shymkent Challenger – Doubles =

Doubles
- 2026 Shymkent Challenger

Final
- Champions: (Germany) Max Hans Rehberg (Germany) Max Wiskandt
- Runners-up: (United States) Dali Blanch; Svyatoslav Gulin
- Score: 6–1, 5–7, [10–6]

Events
Singles	Doubles
- Shymkent Challenger

Sanjar Fayziev and Markos Kalovelonis were the defending champions but chose not to defend their title.

Max Hans Rehberg and Max Wiskandt won the title after defeating Dali Blanch and Svyatoslav Gulin 6–1, 5–7, [10–6] in the final.

== Seeds ==
1. Sergey Betov / Daniil Ostapenkov (first round)
2. (Croatia) Admir Kalender / (Croatia) Mili Poljičak (first round)
3. (Uzbekistan) Sergey Fomin / (Ukraine) Vladyslav Orlov (first round)
4. Petr Bar Biryukov / (Kazakhstan) Grigoriy Lomakin (first round)

== Draw ==
Key

- Q = Qualifier
- WC = Wild card
- LL = Lucky loser
- Alt = Alternate
- ITF = ITF entry
- PR = Protected ranking
- SR = Special ranking
- SE = Special exempt
- JE = Junior exempt
- JR = Junior Accelerator Programme entrant
- CO = College Accelerator Programme entrant
- NG = Next Gen Accelerator Program entrant
- w/o = Walkover
- r = Retired
- d = Defaulted

First round
1	S Betov; D Ostapenkov	4	6^{4}
(Moldova) R Albot (Kazakhstan) D Yevseyev	6	7^{7}
PR	(Netherlands) G Brouwer (India) J Nedunchezhiyan	1	4
(Turkey) E Kırkın (Bosnia and Herzegovina) A Nedić	6	6
3	(Uzbekistan) S Fomin (Ukraine) V Orlov	1	4
WC	(Uzbekistan) Nikita Belozertsev (Ukraine) O Krutykh	6	6
(United States) Dali Blanch; Svyatoslav Gulin	7^{7}	6
WC	(Kazakhstan) A Omarkhanov (Kazakhstan) Damir Zhalgasbay	6^{5}	3
Alt	Denis Klok (Ukraine) O Prihodko	5	6^{8}
(France) Sean Cuenin (France) Mathys Erhard	7	7^{10}
(Belgium) B Gadamauri (Netherlands) J Sels	6	7
4	P Bar Biryukov (Kazakhstan) G Lomakin	2	5
(Japan) Tomohiro Masabayashi (Japan) N Tajima	6^{9}	6	[10]
(Norway) V Durasovic (Germany) K Wehnelt	7^{11}	3	[7]
(Germany) MH Rehberg (Germany) M Wiskandt	6	6
2	(Croatia) A Kalender (Croatia) M Poljičak	2	4

Quarterfinals
(Moldova) R Albot (Kazakhstan) D Yevseyev	6	2	[10]
(Turkey) E Kırkın (Bosnia and Herzegovina) A Nedić	4	6	[8]
WC	(Uzbekistan) N Belozertsev (Ukraine) O Krutykh	1	3
(United States) Dal Blanch; S Gulin	6	6
(France) S Cuenin (France) M Erhard	3	4
(Belgium) B Gadamauri (Netherlands) J Sels	6	6
(Japan) T Masabayashi (Japan) N Tajima	4	2
(Germany) MH Rehberg (Germany) M Wiskandt	6	6

Semifinals
(Moldova) R Albot (Kazakhstan) D Yevseyev	4	2
(United States) Dal Blanch; S Gulin	6	6
(Belgium) B Gadamauri (Netherlands) J Sels	4	4
(Germany) MH Rehberg (Germany) M Wiskandt	6	6

Final
(United States) Dal Blanch; S Gulin	1	7	[6]
(Germany) MH Rehberg (Germany) M Wiskandt	6	5	[10]
