= 2018 Shymkent Challenger – Doubles =

Doubles
- 2018 Shymkent Challenger

Final
- Champions: (Italy) Lorenzo Giustino (Portugal) Gonçalo Oliveira
- Runners-up: (Austria) Lucas Miedler (Austria) Sebastian Ofner
- Score: 6–2, 7–6^{(7–4)}

Events
Singles	Doubles
- Shymkent Challenger

Doubles matches were held in 2018 at the 2018 Shymkent Challenger clay court tennis tournament held June 4 to 9 in Shymkent, Kazakhstan.

Hans Podlipnik-Castillo and Andrei Vasilevski were the defending champions but chose not to defend their title.

Lorenzo Giustino and Gonçalo Oliveira won the title after defeating Lucas Miedler and Sebastian Ofner 6–2, 7–6^{(7–4)} in the final.

== Seeds ==
1. (Germany) Kevin Krawietz / (Germany) Andreas Mies (quarterfinals)
2. (Japan) Toshihide Matsui / (Japan) Yasutaka Uchiyama (quarterfinals)
3. (Spain) Gerard Granollers / (Spain) Enrique López Pérez (quarterfinals)
4. (Russia) Mikhail Elgin / (Russia) Ivan Gakhov (first round)

== Draw ==
Key

- Q = Qualifier
- WC = Wild card
- LL = Lucky loser
- Alt = Alternate
- ITF = ITF entry
- PR = Protected ranking
- SR = Special ranking
- SE = Special exempt
- JE = Junior exempt
- JR = Junior Accelerator Programme entrant
- CO = College Accelerator Programme entrant
- NG = Next Gen Accelerator Program entrant
- w/o = Walkover
- r = Retired
- d = Defaulted

First round
1	(Germany) K Krawietz (Germany) A Mies	7^{11}	6
WC	(Kazakhstan) R Khassanov (Kazakhstan) G Lomakin	6^{9}	1
(Serbia) N Čačić (Croatia) N Serdarušić	4	4
(Italy) L Giustino (Portugal) G Oliveira	6	6
3	(Spain) G Granollers (Spain) E López Pérez	7^{7}	6
(Egypt) M Safwat (Bosnia and Herzegovina) A Šetkić	6^{2}	1
(Lithuania) L Grigelis (Belarus) U Ignatik	6	6
WC	(Kazakhstan) T Khabibulin (Kazakhstan) A Nedovyesov	3	4
(Brazil) G Clezar (United States) A Lawson	6	4	[10]
(United States) R Galloway (United States) N Lammons	3	6	[8]
(Austria) L Miedler (Austria) S Ofner	7	2	[11]
4	(Russia) M Elgin (Russia) I Gakhov	5	6	[9]
(Chinese Taipei) T Chen (New Zealand) R Statham	1	4
WC	(India) A Kadhe (Kazakhstan) D Yevseyev	6	6
(Croatia) A Pavić (Brazil) F Romboli	3	4
2	(Japan) T Matsui (Japan) Y Uchiyama	6	6

Quarterfinals
1	(Germany) K Krawietz (Germany) A Mies	4	6^{5}
(Italy) L Giustino (Portugal) G Oliveira	6	7^{7}
3	(Spain) G Granollers (Spain) E López Pérez	3	4
(Lithuania) L Grigelis (Belarus) U Ignatik	6	6
(Brazil) G Clezar (United States) A Lawson	4	5
(Austria) L Miedler (Austria) S Ofner	6	7
WC	(India) A Kadhe (Kazakhstan) D Yevseyev	7	6
2	(Japan) T Matsui (Japan) Y Uchiyama	5	3

Semifinals
(Italy) L Giustino (Portugal) G Oliveira	6	6
(Lithuania) L Grigelis (Belarus) U Ignatik	3	2
(Austria) L Miedler (Austria) S Ofner	6	6
WC	(India) A Kadhe (Kazakhstan) D Yevseyev	2	4

Final
(Italy) L Giustino (Portugal) G Oliveira	6	7^{7}
(Austria) L Miedler (Austria) S Ofner	2	6^{4}
