= 2018 Shymkent Challenger =

- Date: 4–9 June
- Edition: 2nd
- Surface: Clay
- Location: Shymkent, Kazakhstan

Champions

Singles
- (Germany) Yannick Hanfmann

Doubles
- (Italy) Lorenzo Giustino / (Portugal) Gonçalo Oliveira
- Shymkent Challenger

The 2018 Shymkent Challenger was a professional tennis tournament played on clay courts. It was the second edition of the tournament which was part of the 2018 ATP Challenger Tour. It took place in Shymkent, Kazakhstan between 4 and 9 June 2018.

== Singles main-draw entrants ==
=== Seeds ===
| Country | Player | Rank^{1} | Seed |
|---|---|---|---|
| GER | Yannick Hanfmann | 138 | 1 |
| BOL | Hugo Dellien | 145 | 2 |
| AUT | Sebastian Ofner | 147 | 3 |
| EGY | Mohamed Safwat | 182 | 4 |
| ESP | Ricardo Ojeda Lara | 187 | 5 |
| CRO | Nino Serdarušić | 201 | 6 |
| BLR | Uladzimir Ignatik | 202 | 7 |
| ESP | Enrique López Pérez | 208 | 8 |

- ^{1} Rankings are as of 28 May 2018.

=== Other entrants ===
The following players received wildcards into the singles main draw:

- (Russia) Alen Avidzba
- (Kazakhstan) Roman Khassanov
- (Kazakhstan) Grigoriy Lomakin
- (Kazakhstan) Denis Yevseyev

The following players received entry from the qualifying draw:

- (Germany) Kevin Krawietz
- (Germany) Daniel Masur
- (Austria) Jurij Rodionov
- (Chinese Taipei) Wu Tung-lin

== Champions ==
=== Singles ===
- (Germany) Yannick Hanfmann def. (Dominican Republic) Roberto Cid Subervi 7–6^{(7–3)}, 4–6, 6–2.

=== Doubles ===
- (Italy) Lorenzo Giustino / (Portugal) Gonçalo Oliveira def. (Austria) Lucas Miedler / (Austria) Sebastian Ofner 6–2, 7–6^{(7–4)}.
