= 2026 Shymkent Challenger – Singles =

Singles
- 2026 Shymkent Challenger

Final
- Champion: (Uzbekistan) Sergey Fomin
- Runner-up: (Kazakhstan) Timofey Skatov
- Score: 6–3, 7–5

Events
Singles	Doubles
- Shymkent Challenger

Sergey Fomin was the defending champion and successfully defended his title after defeating Timofey Skatov 6–3, 7–5 in the final.

== Seeds ==
1. (Kazakhstan) Timofey Skatov (final)
2. (Belgium) Gilles-Arnaud Bailly (second round)
3. Ivan Gakhov (second round, retired)
4. (Bosnia and Herzegovina) Andrej Nedić (semifinals)
5. (Austria) Sandro Kopp (second round)
6. (France) Antoine Ghibaudo (semifinals)
7. (France) Sean Cuenin (first round)
8. Petr Bar Biryukov (second round)

== Draw ==
Key

- Q = Qualifier
- WC = Wild card
- LL = Lucky loser
- Alt = Alternate
- ITF = ITF entry
- PR = Protected ranking
- SR = Special ranking
- SE = Special exempt
- JE = Junior exempt
- JR = Junior Accelerator Programme entrant
- CO = College Accelerator Programme entrant
- NG = Next Gen Accelerator Program entrant
- w/o = Walkover
- r = Retired
- d = Defaulted

=== Finals ===
Semifinals
1	(Kazakhstan) Timofey Skatov	6	6
6	(France) Antoine Ghibaudo	2	2
4	(Bosnia and Herzegovina) Andrej Nedić	6	1	4
(Uzbekistan) Sergey Fomin	4	6	6

Final
1	(Kazakhstan) Timofey Skatov	3	5
(Uzbekistan) Sergey Fomin	6	7

=== Top half ===
First round
1	(Kazakhstan) T Skatov	6	6
(Ukraine) O Prihodko	4	4
Alt	Svyatoslav Gulin	6	5	6
PR	(Germany) MH Rehberg	4	7	3
Q	D Ostapenkov	6	5	7^{8}
(Italy) S Pieri	4	7	6^{6}
(Belgium) B Gadamauri	7^{8}	7^{7}
7	(France) Sean Cuenin	6^{6}	6^{2}
3	I Gakhov	6	7
WC	(Kazakhstan) Z Nurlanuly	3	5
(Poland) T Berkieta	6	3	2
(Netherlands) J Sels	4	6	6
(Moldova) R Albot	6	6
WC	(Kazakhstan) A Omarkhanov	1	4
Q	(Croatia) M Poljičak	3	4
6	(France) A Ghibaudo	6	6

Second round
1	(Kazakhstan) T Skatov	6	3	6
Alt	S Gulin	2	6	4
Q	D Ostapenkov	6	4	6
(Belgium) B Gadamauri	2	6	4
3	I Gakhov	5	2^{r}
(Netherlands) J Sels	7	4
(Moldova) R Albot	3	3
6	(France) A Ghibaudo	6	6

Quarterfinals
1	(Kazakhstan) T Skatov	6^{4}	7^{7}	6
Q	D Ostapenkov	7^{7}	6^{5}	4
(Netherlands) J Sels	4	3
6	(France) A Ghibaudo	6	6

Semifinals
1	(Kazakhstan) T Skatov	6	6
6	(France) A Ghibaudo	2	2

=== Bottom half ===
First round
8	P Bar Biryukov	3	6	6
PR	(Netherlands) G Brouwer	6	1	3
(United States) Dali Blanch	7^{7}	6
(Kazakhstan) D Yevseyev	6^{2}	1
Q	Bekkhan Atlangeriev	6	6^{5}	6
(Norway) V Durasovic	4	7^{7}	4
Q	(Ukraine) O Krutykh	6	2	4
4	(Bosnia and Herzegovina) A Nedić	1	6	6
5	(Austria) S Kopp	6	6
WC	(Kazakhstan) Damir Zhalgasbay	4	1
(Uzbekistan) S Fomin	6	3	6
Q	(Ukraine) V Orlov	3	6	3
(Germany) M Wiskandt	6	7^{7}
(France) Mathys Erhard	1	6^{2}
Q	(Turkey) E Kırkın	3	2
2	(Belgium) GA Bailly	6	6

Second round
8	P Bar Biryukov	7^{7}	4	1
(United States) Dal Blanch	6^{2}	6	6
Q	B Atlangeriev	6	1	0
4	(Bosnia and Herzegovina) A Nedić	4	6	6
5	(Austria) S Kopp	7^{7}	6^{3}	4
(Uzbekistan) S Fomin	6^{5}	7^{7}	6
(Germany) M Wiskandt	7	6
2	(Belgium) GA Bailly	5	3

Quarterfinals
(United States) Dal Blanch	2	2
4	(Bosnia and Herzegovina) A Nedić	6	6
(Uzbekistan) S Fomin	1	6	6
(Germany) M Wiskandt	6	3	3

Semifinals
4	(Bosnia and Herzegovina) A Nedić	6	1	4
(Uzbekistan) S Fomin	4	6	6
