= 2018 Shymkent Challenger – Singles =

Singles
- 2018 Shymkent Challenger

Final
- Champion: (Germany) Yannick Hanfmann
- Runner-up: (Dominican Republic) Roberto Cid Subervi
- Score: 7–6^{(7–3)}, 4–6, 6–2

Events
Singles	Doubles
- Shymkent Challenger

Singles matches were held in 2018 at the 2018 Shymkent Challenger clay court tennis tournament held June 4 to 9 in Shymkent, Kazakhstan.

Ričardas Berankis was the defending champion but chose not to defend his title.

Yannick Hanfmann won the title after defeating Roberto Cid Subervi 7–6^{(7–3)}, 4–6, 6–2 in the final.

== Seeds ==
1. (Germany) Yannick Hanfmann (champion)
2. (Bolivia) Hugo Dellien (semifinals)
3. (Austria) Sebastian Ofner (quarterfinals)
4. (Egypt) Mohamed Safwat (second round)
5. (Croatia) Nino Serdarušić (second round)
6. (Belarus) Uladzimir Ignatik (first round)
7. (Spain) Enrique López Pérez (first round)
8. (Portugal) Gonçalo Oliveira (first round)

== Draw ==
Key

- Q = Qualifier
- WC = Wild card
- LL = Lucky loser
- Alt = Alternate
- ITF = ITF entry
- PR = Protected ranking
- SR = Special ranking
- SE = Special exempt
- JE = Junior exempt
- JR = Junior Accelerator Programme entrant
- CO = College Accelerator Programme entrant
- NG = Next Gen Accelerator Program entrant
- w/o = Walkover
- r = Retired
- d = Defaulted

=== Finals ===
Semifinals
1	(Germany) Yannick Hanfmann	6	6
(Italy) Lorenzo Giustino	1	0
(Dominican Republic) Roberto Cid Subervi	6^{4}	6	6
2	(Bolivia) Hugo Dellien	7^{7}	4	1

Final
1	(Germany) Yannick Hanfmann	7^{7}	4	6
(Dominican Republic) Roberto Cid Subervi	6^{3}	6	2

=== Top half ===
First round
1	(Germany) Y Hanfmann	6	6
WC	(Russia) A Avidzba	4	2
Q	(Chinese Taipei) T-l Wu	7	6
(Brazil) G Clezar	5	4
Q	(Austria) J Rodionov	6	6
(Serbia) P Krstin	3	2
(Lithuania) L Grigelis	6	7
7	(Spain) E López Pérez	3	5
4	(Egypt) M Safwat	7	7
(Spain) C Gómez-Herrera	5	5
(Serbia) D Petrović	2^{r}
(Italy) L Giustino	3
(Spain) D Muñoz de la Nava	6	6
WC	(Kazakhstan) G Lomakin	1	4
Q	(Germany) K Krawietz	6	6
8	(Portugal) G Oliveira	1	1

Second round
1	(Germany) Y Hanfmann	6	6
Q	(Chinese Taipei) T-l Wu	1	0
Q	(Austria) J Rodionov	6	3	7^{7}
(Lithuania) L Grigelis	4	6	6^{4}
4	(Egypt) M Safwat	4	7^{10}	4
(Italy) L Giustino	6	6^{8}	6
(Spain) D Muñoz de la Nava	4	4
Q	(Germany) K Krawietz	6	6

Quarterfinals
1	(Germany) Y Hanfmann	7	7
Q	(Austria) J Rodionov	5	5
(Italy) L Giustino	7	4	6
Q	(Germany) K Krawietz	5	6	3

Semifinals
1	(Germany) Y Hanfmann	6	6
(Italy) L Giustino	1	0

=== Bottom half ===
First round
5	(Croatia) N Serdarušić	7	6
WC	(Kazakhstan) R Khassanov	5	2
(Dominican Republic) R Cid Subervi	1	6	6
(Chinese Taipei) T-h Yang	6	0	1
(Russia) I Nedelko	7	6
WC	(Kazakhstan) D Yevseyev	5	3
(Belgium) A De Greef	6^{1}	1^{r}
3	(Austria) S Ofner	7^{7}	5
6	(Belarus) U Ignatik	4	7^{7}	4
Q	(Germany) D Masur	6	6^{4}	6
(Argentina) H Casanova	0	1
(Kazakhstan) A Nedovyesov	6	6
(Croatia) A Pavić	6	6
(Bosnia and Herzegovina) A Šetkić	2	4
(Spain) R Ortega Olmedo	6	6^{5}	0
2	(Bolivia) H Dellien	3	7^{7}	6

Second round
5	(Croatia) N Serdarušić	2	4
(Dominican Republic) R Cid Subervi	6	6
(Russia) I Nedelko	6	6^{2}	2^{r}
3	(Austria) S Ofner	1	7^{7}	4
Q	(Germany) D Masur	5	2
(Kazakhstan) A Nedovyesov	7	6
(Croatia) A Pavić	2	4
2	(Bolivia) H Dellien	6	6

Quarterfinals
(Dominican Republic) R Cid Subervi	6	6
3	(Austria) S Ofner	2	1
(Kazakhstan) A Nedovyesov	6	1	0
2	(Bolivia) H Dellien	3	6	6

Semifinals
(Dominican Republic) R Cid Subervi	6^{4}	6	6
2	(Bolivia) H Dellien	7^{7}	4	1
