= 2019 Shymkent Challenger II =

- Date: 10–16 June
- Edition: 4th
- Surface: Clay
- Location: Shymkent, Kazakhstan

Champions

Singles
- (Slovakia) Andrej Martin

Doubles
- (Serbia) Nikola Čačić / (Chinese Taipei) Yang Tsung-hua
- Shymkent Challenger

The 2019 Shymkent Challenger II was a professional tennis tournament played on clay courts. It was the fourth edition of the tournament which was part of the 2019 ATP Challenger Tour. It took place in Shymkent, Kazakhstan between 10 and 16 June 2019.

== Singles main-draw entrants ==
=== Seeds ===
Country	Player	Rank^{1}	Seed
TUN	Malek Jaziri	92	1
ITA	Stefano Travaglia	119	2
SVK	Andrej Martin	154	3
ITA	Lorenzo Giustino	159	4
~~GER~~	~~Yannick Hanfmann~~	~~180~~	~~5~~
AUS	Marc Polmans	185	6
KAZ	Aleksandr Nedovyesov	189	7
SRB	Peđa Krstin	206	8
~~RUS~~	~~Evgeny Karlovskiy~~	~~214~~	~~9~~
AUS	Akira Santillan	228	10
ARG	Federico Coria	234	11
CAN	Steven Diez	240	12
JPN	Kaichi Uchida	241	13
POR	Gonçalo Oliveira	254	14
ESP	Daniel Gimeno Traver	258	15
AUS	Max Purcell	259	16

- ^{1} Rankings are as of 27 May 2019.

=== Other entrants ===
The following players received wildcards into the singles main draw:

- (Uzbekistan) Sergey Fomin
- (Kazakhstan) Andrey Golubev
- (Turkey) Ergi Kırkın
- (Kazakhstan) Timofei Skatov
- (Kazakhstan) Dostanbek Tashbulatov

The following players received entry into the singles main draw as alternates:

- (Ecuador) ~~Gonzalo Escobar~~
- (Ukraine) Vladyslav Manafov
- (Croatia) Ante Pavić
- (China) Wu Di

The following players received entry into the singles main draw using their ITF World Tennis Ranking:

- (Italy) Riccardo Bonadio
- (France) Baptiste Crepatte
- (Uzbekistan) Sanjar Fayziev
- (Russia) Konstantin Kravchuk
- (Tunisia) Skander Mansouri

The following players received entry from the qualifying draw:

- (United States) Sebastian Korda
- (Chile) Alejandro Tabilo

The following players received entry as lucky losers:

- (Bulgaria) Alexandar Lazarov
- (Kazakhstan) Grigoriy Lomakin

== Champions ==
=== Singles ===
- (Slovakia) Andrej Martin def. (Italy) Stefano Travaglia 6–4, 6–4.

=== Doubles ===
- (Serbia) Nikola Čačić / (Chinese Taipei) Yang Tsung-hua def. (Sweden) André Göransson / (Switzerland) Marc-Andrea Hüsler 6–4, 6–4.
