= 2022 Shymkent Challenger II – Doubles =

Doubles
- 2022 Shymkent Challenger II

Final
- Champions: (Uzbekistan) Sanjar Fayziev (Greece) Markos Kalovelonis
- Runners-up: (Denmark) Mikael Torpegaard (Japan) Kaichi Uchida
- Score: 6–7^{(3–7)}, 6–4, [10–4]

Events
Singles	Doubles
- Shymkent Challenger

Antoine Bellier and Gabriel Décamps were the defending champions but chose not to compete.

Sanjar Fayziev and Markos Kalovelonis won the title after defeating Mikael Torpegaard and Kaichi Uchida 6–7^{(3–7)}, 6–4, [10–4] in the final.

== Seeds ==
1. (India) Arjun Kadhe / (Ukraine) Vladyslav Manafov (quarterfinals)
2. (Uzbekistan) Sanjar Fayziev / (Greece) Markos Kalovelonis (champions)
3. Yan Bondarevskiy / (Kazakhstan) Grigoriy Lomakin (semifinals)
4. Evgeny Karlovskiy / Evgenii Tiurnev (quarterfinals)

== Draw ==
Key

- Q = Qualifier
- WC = Wild card
- LL = Lucky loser
- Alt = Alternate
- ITF = ITF entry
- PR = Protected ranking
- SR = Special ranking
- SE = Special exempt
- JE = Junior exempt
- JR = Junior Accelerator Programme entrant
- CO = College Accelerator Programme entrant
- NG = Next Gen Accelerator Program entrant
- w/o = Walkover
- r = Retired
- d = Defaulted

First round
1	(India) A Kadhe (Ukraine) V Manafov	7	7^{7}
B Bobrov; A Shevchenko	5	6^{3}
(Uzbekistan) D Istomin (Kazakhstan) D Yevseyev	6^{4}	3
(Denmark) M Torpegaard (Japan) K Uchida	7^{7}	6
3	Yan Bondarevskiy (Kazakhstan) G Lomakin	6	6
(Norway) V Durasovic; I Gakhov	4	3
WC	(Ukraine) Mykhailo Mossur (Kazakhstan) Nikita Sidorov	1	2
A Kachmazov (Kazakhstan) B Zhukayev	6	6
Martin Borisiouk (Georgia (country)) S Purtseladze	6	3	[4]
4	E Karlovskiy; E Tiurnev	4	6	[10]
WC	(Kazakhstan) Timur Maulenov (Kazakhstan) Dostanbek Tashbulatov	2	6	[6]
(Uzbekistan) S Fomin (Greece) Pe Tsitsipas	6	3	[10]
(Romania) Bogdan Ionuț Apostol (Sweden) DN Mădăraș
2	(Uzbekistan) S Fayziev (Greece) M Kalovelonis	w/o

Quarterfinals
1	(India) A Kadhe (Ukraine) V Manafov	4	7^{7}	[6]
(Denmark) M Torpegaard (Japan) K Uchida	6	6^{5}	[10]
3	Y Bondarevskiy (Kazakhstan) G Lomakin	w/o
(Romania) ND Ionel (Romania) FC Jianu
A Kachmazov (Kazakhstan) B Zhukayev	6	7
4	E Karlovskiy; E Tiurnev	3	5
(Uzbekistan) S Fomin (Greece) Pe Tsitsipas	4	2
2	(Uzbekistan) S Fayziev (Greece) M Kalovelonis	6	6

Semifinals
(Denmark) M Torpegaard (Japan) K Uchida	6	6
3	Y Bondarevskiy (Kazakhstan) G Lomakin	4	1
A Kachmazov (Kazakhstan) B Zhukayev	7	6^{5}	[5]
2	(Uzbekistan) S Fayziev (Greece) M Kalovelonis	5	7^{7}	[10]

Final
(Denmark) M Torpegaard (Japan) K Uchida	7^{7}	4	[4]
2	(Uzbekistan) S Fayziev (Greece) M Kalovelonis	6^{3}	6	[10]
