= 2026 Shymkent Challenger =

- Date: 20–25 April
- Edition: 7th
- Surface: Clay
- Location: Shymkent, Kazakhstan

Champions

Singles
- (Uzbekistan) Sergey Fomin

Doubles
- (Germany) Max Hans Rehberg / (Germany) Max Wiskandt
- Shymkent Challenger

The 2026 Shymkent Challenger was a professional tennis tournament played on clay courts. It was the seventh edition of the tournament which was part of the 2026 ATP Challenger Tour. It took place in Shymkent, Kazakhstan between 20 and 25 April 2026.

== Singles main-draw entrants ==
=== Seeds ===
Country	Player	Rank^{1}	Seed
KAZ	Timofey Skatov	195	1
BEL	Gilles-Arnaud Bailly	206	2
	Ivan Gakhov	268	3
BIH	Andrej Nedić	288	4
AUT	Sandro Kopp	313	5
FRA	Antoine Ghibaudo	322	6
FRA	Sean Cuenin	337	7
	Petr Bar Biryukov	344	8

- ^{1} Rankings are as of 13 April 2026.

=== Other entrants ===
The following players received wildcards into the singles main draw:

- (Kazakhstan) Zangar Nurlanuly
- (Kazakhstan) Amir Omarkhanov
- (Kazakhstan) Damir Zhalgasbay

The following players received entry into the singles main draw using protected rankings:

- (Netherlands) Gijs Brouwer
- (Germany) Max Hans Rehberg

The following player received entry into the singles main draw as an alternate:

- Svyatoslav Gulin

The following players received entry from the qualifying draw:

- Bekkhan Atlangeriev
- (Turkey) Ergi Kırkın
- (Ukraine) Oleksii Krutykh
- (Ukraine) Vladyslav Orlov
- Daniil Ostapenkov
- (Croatia) Mili Poljičak

== Champions ==
=== Singles ===
- (Uzbekistan) Sergey Fomin def. (Kazakhstan) Timofey Skatov 6–3, 7–5.

=== Doubles ===
- (Germany) Max Hans Rehberg / (Germany) Max Wiskandt def. (United States) Dali Blanch / Svyatoslav Gulin 6–1, 5–7, [10–6].
