= 2019 Shymkent Challenger =

- Date: 6–12 May
- Edition: 3rd
- Surface: Clay
- Location: Shymkent, Kazakhstan

Champions

Singles
- (Slovakia) Andrej Martin

Doubles
- (Austria) Jurij Rodionov / (Finland) Emil Ruusuvuori
- Shymkent Challenger

The 2019 Shymkent Challenger was a professional tennis tournament played on clay courts. It was the third edition of the tournament which was part of the 2019 ATP Challenger Tour. It took place in Shymkent, Kazakhstan between 6 and 12 May 2019.

== Singles main-draw entrants ==
=== Seeds ===
Country	Player	Rank^{1}	Seed
BLR	Egor Gerasimov	133	1
GBR	Jay Clarke	159	2
AUT	Jurij Rodionov	190	3
SVK	Andrej Martin	199	4
KAZ	Aleksandr Nedovyesov	210	5
BLR	Uladzimir Ignatik	243	6
POR	Gonçalo Oliveira	259	7
AUT	Gerald Melzer	288	8
RUS	Roman Safiullin	294	9
DOM	Roberto Cid Subervi	297	10
RUS	Pavel Kotov	300	11
CHI	Marcelo Tomás Barrios Vera	301	12
KAZ	Denis Yevseyev	315	13
AUS	Aleksandar Vukic	354	14
BRA	Thiago Seyboth Wild	362	15
NOR	Viktor Durasovic	365	16

- ^{1} Rankings are as of 29 April 2019.

=== Other entrants ===
The following players received wildcards into the singles main draw:

- (Kazakhstan) Andrey Golubev
- (Kazakhstan) Grigoriy Lomakin
- (Kazakhstan) Dmitry Popko
- (Kazakhstan) Dostanbek Tashbulatov
- (Russia) Dimitriy Voronin

The following players received entry into the singles main draw as alternates:

- (Russia) Anton Chekhov
- (Kazakhstan) Timofei Skatov

The following players received entry into the singles main draw using their ITF World Tennis Ranking:

- (Netherlands) Gijs Brouwer
- (Uzbekistan) Sanjar Fayziev
- (Russia) Konstantin Kravchuk
- (Egypt) Karim-Mohamed Maamoun
- (Russia) Alexander Zhurbin

The following players received entry from the qualifying draw:

- (Kazakhstan) Timur Khabibulin
- (Ukraine) Vladyslav Manafov

== Champions ==
=== Singles ===
- (Slovakia) Andrej Martin def. (Kazakhstan) Dmitry Popko 5–7, 6–4, 6–4.

=== Doubles ===
- (Austria) Jurij Rodionov / (Finland) Emil Ruusuvuori def. (Portugal) Gonçalo Oliveira / (Belarus) Andrei Vasilevski 6–4, 3–6, [10–8].
