= 2022 Shymkent Challenger II =

- Date: 16–21 May
- Edition: 6th
- Surface: Clay
- Location: Shymkent, Kazakhstan

Champions

Singles
- (Uzbekistan) Sergey Fomin

Doubles
- (Uzbekistan) Sanjar Fayziev / (Greece) Markos Kalovelonis
- Shymkent Challenger

The 2022 Shymkent Challenger II was a professional tennis tournament played on clay courts. It was the sixth edition of the tournament which was part of the 2022 ATP Challenger Tour. It took place in Shymkent, Kazakhstan between 16 and 21 May 2022.

== Singles main-draw entrants ==
=== Seeds ===
Country	Player	Rank^{1}	Seed
	Alexander Shevchenko	238	1
UKR	Illya Marchenko	254	2
ESP	Nicolás Álvarez Varona	276	3
JPN	Kaichi Uchida	285	4
	Evgeny Karlovskiy	286	5
ROU	Filip Jianu	295	6
UZB	Denis Istomin	299	7
SUI	Antoine Bellier	311	8

- ^{1} Rankings are as of 9 May 2022.

=== Other entrants ===
The following players received wildcards into the singles main draw:

- (Georgia (country)) Saba Purtseladze
- (Kazakhstan) Dostanbek Tashbulatov
- (Kazakhstan) Beibit Zhukayev

The following players received entry into the singles main draw as alternates:

- (Germany) Sebastian Fanselow
- Alibek Kachmazov

The following players received entry from the qualifying draw:

- (Uzbekistan) Sergey Fomin
- Ivan Gakhov
- (India) Arjun Kadhe
- (India) Mukund Sasikumar
- (Ukraine) Eric Vanshelboim
- (United States) Evan Zhu

== Champions ==
=== Singles ===
- (Uzbekistan) Sergey Fomin def. (Netherlands) Robin Haase 7–6^{(7–4)}, 6–3.

=== Doubles ===
- (Uzbekistan) Sanjar Fayziev / (Greece) Markos Kalovelonis def. (Denmark) Mikael Torpegaard / (Japan) Kaichi Uchida 6–7^{(3–7)}, 6–4, [10–4].
