= 2019 Shymkent Challenger II – Doubles =

Doubles
- 2019 Shymkent Challenger II

Final
- Champions: (Serbia) Nikola Čačić (Chinese Taipei) Yang Tsung-hua
- Runners-up: (Sweden) André Göransson (Switzerland) Marc-Andrea Hüsler
- Score: 6–4, 6–4

Events
Singles	Doubles
- Shymkent Challenger

Jurij Rodionov and Emil Ruusuvuori were the defending champions but chose not to defend their title.

Nikola Čačić and Yang Tsung-hua won the title after defeating André Göransson and Marc-Andrea Hüsler 6–4, 6–4 in the final.

== Seeds ==
1. (Portugal) Gonçalo Oliveira / (Belarus) Andrei Vasilevski (quarterfinals)
2. (Bosnia and Herzegovina) Tomislav Brkić / (Croatia) Ante Pavić (first round)
3. (Uruguay) Ariel Behar / (Ecuador) Gonzalo Escobar (quarterfinals)
4. (United States) Evan King / (United States) Hunter Reese (quarterfinals)

== Draw ==
Key

- Q = Qualifier
- WC = Wild card
- LL = Lucky loser
- Alt = Alternate
- ITF = ITF entry
- PR = Protected ranking
- SR = Special ranking
- SE = Special exempt
- JE = Junior exempt
- JR = Junior Accelerator Programme entrant
- CO = College Accelerator Programme entrant
- NG = Next Gen Accelerator Program entrant
- w/o = Walkover
- r = Retired
- d = Defaulted

First round
1	(Portugal) G Oliveira (Belarus) A Vasilevski	7^{7}	7
ITF	(Philippines) F Alcantara (Kazakhstan) G Lomakin	6^{5}	5
(Sweden) A Göransson (Switzerland) M-A Hüsler	6	6
(Canada) S Diez (Serbia) P Krstin	1	1
4	(United States) E King (United States) H Reese	6	0
(Tunisia) M Jaziri (Tunisia) S Mansouri	3	0^{r}
WC	(Russia) K Kravchuk (Kazakhstan) T Skatov	2	1
(Slovakia) A Martin (Chile) H Podlipnik Castillo	6	6
WC	(Kazakhstan) A Golubev (Kazakhstan) A Nedovyesov	3	5
(Serbia) N Čačić (Chinese Taipei) T-h Yang	6	7
ITF	(Uzbekistan) S Fayziev (Chile) A Tabilo	6	2	[8]
3	(Uruguay) A Behar (Ecuador) G Escobar	4	6	[10]
(Australia) M Purcell (Australia) A Santillan	6	6
WC	(Uzbekistan) S Fomin (Kazakhstan) D Yevseyev	1	3
(Kazakhstan) T Khabibulin (Ukraine) V Manafov	7^{8}	2	[10]
2	(Bosnia and Herzegovina) T Brkić (Croatia) A Pavić	6^{6}	6	[6]

Quarterfinals
1	(Portugal) G Oliveira (Belarus) A Vasilevski	5	3
(Sweden) A Göransson (Switzerland) M-A Hüsler	7	6
4	(United States) E King (United States) H Reese	6	4	[6]
(Slovakia) A Martin (Chile) H Podlipnik Castillo	4	6	[10]
(Serbia) N Čačić (Chinese Taipei) T-h Yang	4	7	[11]
3	(Uruguay) A Behar (Ecuador) G Escobar	6	5	[9]
(Australia) M Purcell (Australia) A Santillan	6	6
(Kazakhstan) T Khabibulin (Ukraine) V Manafov	4	4

Semifinals
(Sweden) A Göransson (Switzerland) M-A Hüsler	6	7
(Slovakia) A Martin (Chile) H Podlipnik Castillo	3	5
(Serbia) N Čačić (Chinese Taipei) T-h Yang	4	6	[10]
(Australia) M Purcell (Australia) A Santillan	6	3	[4]

Final
(Sweden) A Göransson (Switzerland) M-A Hüsler	4	4
(Serbia) N Čačić (Chinese Taipei) T-h Yang	6	6
