= Dmitry Popko =

Kazakhstani tennis player

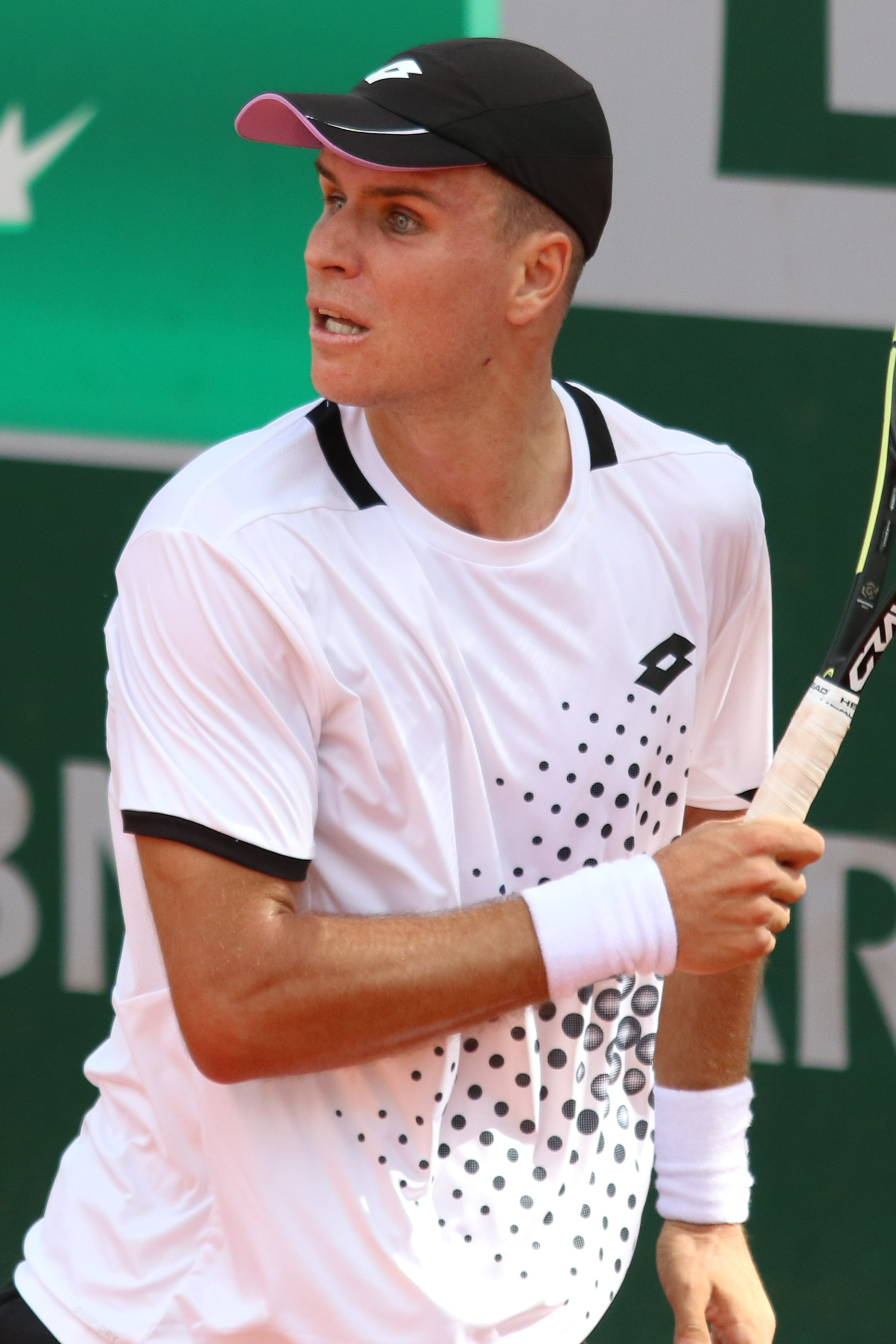
- Popko at the 2022 French Open
- Country (sports): Kazakhstan (2011–present); Russia (2010–2011)
- Residence: Astana, Kazakhstan
- Born: 24 October 1996 (age 30) Saint Petersburg, Russia
- Height: 1.91 m (6 ft 3 in)
- Turned pro: 2011
- Plays: Right-handed (two-handed backhand)
- Coach: Ilya Drozdov
- Prize money: US $1,020,217

Singles
- Career record: 4–9
- Career titles: 0
- Highest ranking: No. 155 (21 April 2025)
- Current ranking: No. 495 (9 November 2026)

Grand Slam singles results
- Australian Open: Q3 (2020, 2022)
- French Open: Q3 (2020)
- Wimbledon: Q1 (2016, 2021, 2025)
- US Open: Q2 (2016, 2022, 2025)

Doubles
- Career record: 0–2
- Career titles: 0
- Highest ranking: No. 304 (1 May 2017)
- Last updated on: 9 November 2026.

Dmitry Yevgenyevich Popko (Дмитрий Евгеньевич Попко; born 24 October 1996) is a Russian-born Kazakhstani tennis player who competes on the ATP Challenger tour. He has a career high ATP singles ranking of World No. 155 achieved on 21 April 2025 and a doubles ranking of No. 304 achieved on 1 May 2017. He is the current No. 4 Kazakh player.

Popko represents Kazakhstan at the Davis Cup where he has a win-loss record of 4–6.

== Career ==
Popko defeated Chinese tennis player Zhang Ze in his first Davis Cup tie in April 2017.

Popko participated in qualifying for all four of the Grand Slams.

== Performance timeline ==
Key
W	F	SF	QF	#R	RR	Q#	DNQ	A	NH

(W) winner; (F) finalist; (SF) semifinalist; (QF) quarterfinalist; (#R) rounds 4, 3, 2, 1; (RR) round-robin stage; (Q#) qualification round; (DNQ) did not qualify; (A) absent; (NH) not held; (SR) strike rate (events won / competed); (W–L) win–loss record.
To avoid confusion and double counting, these charts are updated at the conclusion of a tournament or when the player's participation has ended.

=== Singles ===
Tournament	2016	2017	2018	2019	2020	2021	2022	2023	2024	2025	2026	SR	W–L	Win %
Grand Slam tournaments
Australian Open	Q1	Q1	Q2	A	Q3	A	Q3	A	A	Q1	Q1	0 / 0	0–0	–
French Open	Q1	Q2	A	A	Q3	Q2	Q1	A	Q1	Q2		0 / 0	0–0	–
Wimbledon	Q1	A	A	A	NH	Q1	A	A	A	Q1		0 / 0	0–0	–
US Open	Q2	Q1	A	A	A	Q1	Q2	A	Q1	Q2		0 / 0	0–0	–
Win–loss	0–0	0–0	0–0	0–0	0–0	0–0	0–0	0–0	0–0	0–0	0–0	0 / 0	0–0	–
ATP Masters 1000
Indian Wells Masters	A	A	A	A	NH	A	Q1	A	A	A		0 / 0	0–0	–
Miami Open	A	A	A	A	NH	Q1	Q2	A	A	A		0 / 0	0–0	–
Monte Carlo Masters	A	A	A	A	NH	A	A	A	A	A		0 / 0	0–0	–
Madrid Open	A	A	A	A	NH	A	A	A	A	A		0 / 0	0-0	–
Italian Open	A	A	A	A	A	A	A	A	A	A		0 / 0	0–0	–
Canadian Open	A	A	A	A	NH	A	A	A	A	A		0 / 0	0–0	–
Cincinnati Masters	A	A	A	A	A	A	A	A	A	A		0 / 0	0–0	–
Shanghai Masters	A	A	A	A	NH			A	A	A		0 / 0	0–0	–
Paris Masters	A	A	A	A	A	A	A	A	A	A		0 / 0	0–0	–
Win–loss	0–0	0–0	0–0	0–0	0–0	0–0	0–0	0–0	0–0	0–0	0–0	0 / 0	0–0	–

== ATP Challenger Tour finals ==
=== Singles: 6 (2 titles, 5 runner-ups) ===
Legend ATP Challenger Tour (2–5)

Result	W–L	Date	Tournament	Surface	Opponent	Score
Loss	0–1	May 2019	Shymkent, Kazakhstan	Clay	(Slovakia) Andrej Martin	7–5, 4–6, 4–6
Loss	0–2	Aug 2021	Prague, Czech Republic	Clay	(Czech Republic) Dalibor Svrčina	0–6, 5–7
Win	1–2	Oct 2021	Lisbon, Portugal	Clay	(Italy) Andrea Pellegrino	6–2, 6–4
Loss	1–3	Jan 2024	Buenos Aires, Argentina	Clay	(Peru) Gonzalo Bueno	4–6, 6–2, 6–7^{(4–7)}
Loss	1–4	Jul 2024	Brașov, Romania	Clay	(Bolivia) Murkel Dellien	3–6, 5–7
Win	2–4	Mar 2025	Morelia, Mexico	Hard	(Australia) James Duckworth	1–6, 6–2, 6–4
Loss	2–5	Mar 2025	Morelos, Mexico	Hard	(Switzerland) Marc-Andrea Huesler	4–6, 6–3, 4–6

=== Doubles: 3 (1 title, 2 runner-ups) ===
Legend ATP Challenger Tour (1–2)

Result	W–L	Date	Tournament	Surface	Partner	Opponents	Score
Loss	0–1	May 2016	Karshi, Uzbekistan	Hard	(Georgia (country)) Aleksandre Metreveli	(Spain) Enrique López Pérez (India) Jeevan Nedunchezhiyan	1–6, 4–6
Loss	0–2	Jun 2016	Moscow, Russia	Clay	(Georgia (country)) Aleksandre Metreveli	(Argentina) Facundo Argüello (Venezuela) Roberto Maytín	2–6, 5–7
Win	1–2	Jul 2022	Málaga, Spain	Hard	(Turkey) Altuğ Çelikbilek	(Israel) Daniel Cukierman (Ecuador) Emilio Gómez	6–7^{(4–7)}, 6–4, [10–6]

== ITF Futures/World Tennis Tour finals ==
=== Singles: 39 (28 titles, 11 runner-ups) ===
Legend ITF Futures/WTT (28–11)	Finals by surface Hard (6–3) Clay (22–8)

Result	W–L	Date	Tournament	Tier	Surface	Opponent	Score
Loss	0–1	Nov 2014	Turkey F39, Antalya	Futures	Hard	(Turkey) Cem İlkel	3–6, 1–6
Loss	0–2	May 2015	Romania F1, Galați	Futures	Clay	(Bulgaria) Alexandar Lazov	6–4, 5–7, 4–6
Loss	0–3	May 2015	Romania F2, Galați	Futures	Clay	(Belarus) Maxim Dubarenco	6–7^{(5–7)}, 3–6
Win	1–3	May 2015	Romania F3, Bucharest	Futures	Clay	(Romania) Victor Crivoi	6–4, 7–6^{(7–1)}
Win	2–3	Jun 2015	Serbia F1, Belgrade	Futures	Clay	(Slovakia) Adrian Partl	6–3, 6–4
Loss	2–4	Jul 2015	Austria F2, Seefeld	Futures	Clay	(Italy) Andrea Basso	2–6, 6–4, 4–6
Win	3–4	Aug 2015	Austria F8, Vogau	Futures	Clay	(Austria) Sebastian Ofner	6–0, 6–2
Win	4–4	Oct 2015	Kazakhstan F6, Shymkent	Futures	Clay	(Georgia (country)) Aleksandre Metreveli	6–4, 2–0 ret.
Loss	4–5	Nov 2015	Tunisia F29, El Kantaoui	Futures	Hard	(Spain) David Pérez Sanz	6–3, 6–7^{(4–7)}, 3–6
Win	5–5	Apr 2016	Kazakhstan F4, Shymkent	Futures	Clay	(Ukraine) Artem Smirnov	6–3, 4–6, 6–3
Win	6–5	Nov 2016	Turkey F45, Antalya	Futures	Hard	(Turkey) Altuğ Çelikbilek	6–2, 7–5
Win	7–5	Nov 2016	Turkey F46, Antalya	Futures	Hard	(Russia) Victor Baluda	Walkover
Win	8–5	Dec 2016	Thailand F6, Hua Hin	Futures	Hard	(France) Fabien Reboul	6–4, 6–2
Win	9–5	Mar 2017	Turkey F8, Antalya	Futures	Hard	(Turkey) Anıl Yüksel	6–1, 6–2
Win	10–5	Mar 2017	USA F10, Bakersfield	Futures	Hard	(Belgium) Kimmer Coppejans	6–3, 7–6^{(8–6)}
Loss	10–6	Apr 2017	Uzbekistan F1, Bukhara	Futures	Hard	(Belarus) Egor Gerasimov	1–6, 5–7
Win	11–6	Oct 2017	Turkey F38, Antalya	Futures	Clay	(Bulgaria) Dimitar Kuzmanov	7–5, 3–6, 6–3
Win	12–6	Feb 2019	M25, Weston, United States	World Tennis Tour	Clay	(Chile) Alejandro Tabilo	6–2, 6–3
Win	13–6	Feb 2019	M15, Antalya, Turkey	World Tennis Tour	Clay	(United States) Sebastian Korda	6–4, 3–6, 6–3
Win	14–6	Mar 2019	M15, Antalya, Turkey	World Tennis Tour	Clay	(United States) Sebastian Korda	5–7, 7–5, 7–5
Loss	14–7	Mar 2019	M15, Antalya, Turkey	World Tennis Tour	Clay	(Russia) Ivan Nedelko	4–6, 7–5, 2–6
Win	15–7	Mar 2019	M15, Antalya, Turkey	World Tennis Tour	Clay	(Italy) Pietro Rondoni	5–7, 6–4, 6–1
Win	16–7	Apr 2019	M15, Sunrise, United States	World Tennis Tour	Clay	(United States) Sebastian Korda	6–3, 3–6, 6–4
Win	17–7	Apr 2019	M15, Orange Park, United States	World Tennis Tour	Clay	(Argentina) Agustín Velotti	6–0, 5–7, 6–3
Win	18–7	May 2019	M25, Vero Beach, United States	World Tennis Tour	Clay	(United States) Sekou Bangoura	6–1, 7–6^{(7–1)}
Win	19–7	May 2023	M25, Pensacola, United States	World Tennis Tour	Clay	(United States) Aidan Kim	6–1, 6–4
Win	20–7	Dec 2023	M15, Antalya, Turkey	World Tennis Tour	Clay	(Uzbekistan) Sergey Fomin	6–4, 3–6, 6–2
Win	21–7	Dec 2023	M15, Antalya, Turkey	World Tennis Tour	Clay	(Spain) Max Alcalá Gurri	6–4, 7–5
Win	22–7	Feb 2024	M15, Sunrise, United States	World Tennis Tour	Clay	(United States) Alex Rybakov	7–5, 6–2
Win	23–7	Feb 2024	M15, Palm Coast, United States	World Tennis Tour	Clay	(Ecuador) Andres Andrade	7–5, 1–6, 7–5
Win	24–7	Feb 2024	M15, Naples, United States	World Tennis Tour	Clay	(Ecuador) Andres Andrade	3–6, 7–6^{(7–4)}, 6–4
NP	24–7	Feb 2024	M25, Tucumán, Argentina	World Tennis Tour	Clay	(Brazil) Pedro Sakamoto	not played (due to heavy rain)
Loss	24–8	Mar 2024	M25, Recife, Brazil	World Tennis Tour	Clay	(Argentina) Juan Pablo Ficovich	4–6, 7–6^{(7–4)}, 3–6
Win	25–8	Mar 2024	M25, Feira de Santana, Brazil	World Tennis Tour	Hard	(United States) Harrison Adams	6–4, 6–4
Loss	25–9	Aug 2026	M15, Kuršumlijska Banja, Serbia	World Tennis Tour	Clay	(Serbia) Branko Djurić	2–6, 7–6^{(7–4)}, 3–6
Loss	25–10	Sep 2026	M15, Kuršumlijska Banja, Serbia	World Tennis Tour	Clay	(Serbia) Branko Djurić	7–6^{(7–3)}, 2–6, 4–6
Win	26–10	Sep 2026	M15, Tsaghkadzor, Armenia	World Tennis Tour	Clay	(Argentina) Ignacio Monzon	6–3, 6–4
Win	27–10	Sep 2026	M15, Tsaghkadzor, Armenia	World Tennis Tour	Clay	Dmitry Bessonov	6–3, 6–2
Win	28–10	Sep 2026	M15, Telavi, Georgia	World Tennis Tour	Clay	(Italy) Michele Mecarelli	6–0, 6–1
Loss	28–11	Oct 2026	M15, Telavi, Georgia	World Tennis Tour	Clay	(Netherlands) Stijn Paardekooper	4–6, 3–6

=== Doubles: 10 (6 titles, 4 runner-ups) ===
Legend ITF Futures/WTT (6–4)	Finals by surface Hard (1–2) Clay (5–2)

Result	W–L	Date	Tournament	Tier	Surface	Partner	Opponents	Score
Win	1–0	Jun 2014	Hungary F2, Siófok	Futures	Clay	(Russia) Kirill Dmitriev	(Sweden) Isak Arvidsson (Sweden) Robin Olin	6–2, 4–6, [15–13]
Loss	1–1	Aug 2014	Austria F6, Wels	Futures	Clay	(Russia) Kirill Dmitriev	(Austria) Pascal Brunner (Austria) Dennis Novak	4–6, 3–6
Loss	1–2	Aug 2014	Austria F8, Vogau	Futures	Clay	(Austria) Tristan-Samuel Weissborn	(Austria) Pascal Brunner (Austria) Thomas Statzberger	6–2, 1–6, [10–12]
Loss	1–3	Apr 2015	Qatar F3, Doha	Futures	Hard	(Russia) Kirill Dmitriev	(United Kingdom) Scott Clayton (United Kingdom) James Marsalek	3–6, 2–6
Win	2–3	Jun 2015	Serbia F1, Belgrade	Futures	Clay	(Russia) Kirill Dmitriev	(Serbia) Denis Bejtulahi (Hungary) Viktor Filipenkó	6–2, 3–6, [10–6]
Win	3–5	Nov 2016	Turkey F44, Antalya	Futures	Hard	(Russia) Bogdan Bobrov	(Russia) Maxim Ratniuk (Ukraine) Volodymyr Uzhylovskyi	6–7^{(4–7)}, 6–0, [10–7]
Loss	3–6	Nov 2016	Turkey F45, Antalya	Futures	Hard	(Ukraine) Volodymyr Uzhylovskyi	(Russia) Victor Baluda (Russia) Alexander Pavlioutchenkov	3–6, 6–7^{(2–7)}
Win	4–6	Oct 2017	Turkey F38, Antalya	Futures	Clay	(Serbia) Nikola Ćaćić	(Germany) Peter Torebko (Belgium) Jeroen Vanneste	6–1, 6–4
Win	5–6	Feb 2019	M15 Antalya, Turkey	World Tennis Tour	Clay	(Italy) Riccardo Bellotti	(Argentina) Hernan Casanova (Argentina) Tomas Lipovsek Puches	6–4, 7–6^{(7–3)}
Win	7–6	Mar 2024	M25 Recife, Brazil	World Tennis Tour	Clay	(Brazil) Daniel Dutra da Silva	(Brazil) Luís Britto (Brazil) Paulo André Saraiva dos Santos	6–3, 6–4
