= Sebastian Fanselow =

German tennis player

- Country (sports): Germany
- Born: 30 December 1991 (age 34) Saarlouis, Germany
- Retired: 2026
- Plays: Right-handed
- Prize money: $229,729

Singles
- Career record: 0–1 (at ATP Tour level, Grand Slam level, and in Davis Cup)
- Career titles: 12 ITF
- Highest ranking: No. 273 (8 August 2022)
- Current ranking: No. 1,101 (10 November 2025)

Doubles
- Career record: 0–0 (at ATP Tour level, Grand Slam level, and in Davis Cup)
- Career titles: 5 ITF
- Highest ranking: No. 358 (15 August 2022)
- Current ranking: No. 1,924 (10 November 2025)
- Last updated on: 10 November 2025.

Sebastian Fanselow (born 30 December 1991) is a German former tennis player. He has a career high ATP singles ranking of world No. 273 achieved on 8 August 2022, and a doubles ranking of No. 358 achieved on 15 August 2022.

== Career ==
=== 2024: ATP debut ===
He made his ATP main draw debut at the 2024 Lyon Open after entering the singles main draw as a lucky loser, losing to Yoshihito Nishioka in the first round.

== ATP Challenger finals ==
=== Singles: 1 (1 runner-up) ===
Result	W–L	Date	Tournament	Surface	Opponent	Score
Loss	0–1	May 2022	Shymkent, Kazakhstan	Clay	(United States) Emilio Nava	4–6, 6–7^{(3–7)}

=== Doubles 1 (1 runner-up) ===
Result	W–L	Date	Tournament	Surface	Partner	Opponents	Score
Loss	0–1	May 2022	Shymkent, Kazakhstan	Clay	(Japan) Kaichi Uchida	(Switzerland) Antoine Bellier (Brazil) Gabriel Décamps	6–7^{(3–7)}, 3–6
