= Gabriel Décamps =

Brazilian tennis player

- Country (sports): Brazil
- Born: 7 August 1999 (age 27) São Paulo, Brazil
- Height: 1.93 m (6 ft 4 in)
- Plays: Right-handed (two-handed backhand)
- College: UCF
- Coach: Bruce Gorregues
- Prize money: US $59,843

Singles
- Career record: 0–0
- Career titles: 0
- Highest ranking: No. 262 (19 September 2022)

Doubles
- Career record: 0–0
- Career titles: 0; 1 Challenger
- Highest ranking: No. 406 (6 March 2023)

Gabriel Décamps (born 7 August 1999) is a Brazilian tennis player. Décamps has a career-high ATP singles ranking of world No. 262 achieved on 19 September 2022 and a doubles ranking of No. 406 achieved on 6 March 2023.

Décamps played college tennis at Central Florida.

In April 2023, he announced his temporary withdrawal of professional tennis due mental health issues. In September of that year, he returned to tennis activities.

== ATP Challenger Tour finals ==
=== Doubles: 2 (1 title, 1 runner-up) ===
Legend ATP Challenger Tour (1–1)

Result	W–L	Date	Tournament	Tier	Surface	Partner	Opponents	Score
Win	1–0	May 2022	Shymkent Challenger, Kazakhstan	Challenger	Clay	(Switzerland) Antoine Bellier	(Germany) Sebastian Fanselow (Japan) Kaichi Uchida	7–6^{(7–3)}, 6–3
Loss	1–1	Feb 2023	Coosa Valley Open, USA	Challenger	Hard (i)	(United States) Alex Rybakov	(United Kingdom) Luke Johnson (Netherlands) Sem Verbeek	2–6, 2–6

== ITF World Tennis Tour finals ==
=== Singles: 5 (2 titles, 3 runner-ups) ===
Legend ITF WTT (2–3)	Finals by surface Hard (2–3) Clay (0–0)

Result	W–L	Date	Tournament	Tier	Surface	Opponent	Score
Loss	0–1	Sep 2021	M15 Monastir, Tunisia	WTT	Hard	(Australia) Li Tu	2–6, 1–6
Win	1–1	Oct 2021	M15 Sharm El Sheikh, Egypt	WTT	Hard	(Czech Republic) Petr Hájek	7–5, 6–7^{(4–7)}, 6–0
Loss	1–2	Nov 2021	M15 Monastir, Tunisia	WTT	Hard	(Netherlands) Guy den Ouden	3–6, 4–6
Loss	1–3	Aug 2023	M15 Budapest, Hungary	WTT	Hard	(United Kingdom) Giles Hussey	6–2, 3–6, 3–6
Win	2–3	Feb 2024	M15 Nakhon Si Thammarat, Thailand	WTT	Hard	(China) Cui Jie	6–2, 6–4

=== Doubles: 3 (1 title, 2 runner-ups) ===
Legend ITF WTT (1–2)

Result	W–L	Date	Tournament	Tier	Surface	Partner	Opponents	Score
Loss	0–1	Sep 2021	M15 Monastir, Tunisia	WTT	Hard	(Germany) Robert Strombachs	(Italy) Mattia Bellucci (New Zealand) Ajeet Rai	6–7^{(1–7)}, 7–6^{(7–5)}, [4–10]
Loss	0–2	Oct 2021	M15 Sharm El Sheikh, Egypt	WTT	Hard	(Czech Republic) Petr Hájek	(Romania) Cezar Crețu (Ukraine) Volodymyr Uzhylovskyi	6–7^{(1–7)}, 1–6
Win	1–2	Mar 2024	M25 Quinta do Lago, Portugal	WTT	Hard	(Finland) Eero Vasa	(Portugal) Tiago Pereira (Bulgaria) Alexander Donski	6–2, 6–7^{(3–7)}, [10–7]
