= Kaichi Uchida =

Japanese tennis player (born 1994)

Kaichi Uchida 内田 海智
- Uchida at the 2026 Wimbledon Championships
- Country (sports): Japan
- Residence: Osaka, Japan
- Born: 23 August 1994 (age 32) Katano, Osaka, Japan
- Height: 1.80 m (5 ft 11 in)
- Turned pro: 2012
- Plays: Right-handed (two handed-backhand)
- Coach: Norberto Valsecchi
- Prize money: US $719,702

Singles
- Career record: 3–3
- Career titles: 0
- Highest ranking: No. 147 (8 May 2023)
- Current ranking: No. 386 (5 October 2026)

Grand Slam singles results
- Australian Open: Q1 (2023)
- French Open: Q1 (2019, 2023, 2026)
- Wimbledon: Q2 (2023)
- US Open: Q2 (2022)

Doubles
- Career record: 1–2
- Career titles: 0
- Highest ranking: No. 156 (16 June 2025)
- Current ranking: No. 384 (5 October 2026)
- Last updated on: 17 October 2026.

Kaichi Uchida (内田 海智, Uchida Kaichi; born 23 August 1994) is a Japanese professional tennis player. Uchida has a career high ATP singles ranking of world No. 147 achieved on 8 May 2023 and a career high ATP doubles ranking of No. 156 achieved on 16 June 2025.

== Career ==
=== 2021: Maiden Challenger title ===
He won his first career ATP Challenger Tour singles title in December 2021 in Rio de Janeiro, Brazil where he defeated Nicolás Álvarez Varona of Spain.

=== 2022: ATP debut and first win ===
He made his ATP debut at the 2022 Los Cabos Open as a qualifier.

Having received a wildcard, he recorded his first ATP main-draw match win at the Korea Open defeating wildcard Hong Seong-chan.

=== 2023: Top 150 debut ===
Uchida reached the top 150 on 24 April 2023.

== National Representation ==
=== Davis Cup ===
In March 2021, Uchida made his debut in the Davis Cup where he represented team Japan on grass courts against team Pakistan. He won the only match that he played, in singles, against Aisam Qureshi in straight sets 6–4, 7–6^{(7–4)}. He was meant to play an additional singles match but it became a dead rubber as the match's result wouldn't have changed the outcome of the tie.

== ATP Challenger Tour finals ==
=== Singles: 3 (2 titles, 1 runner-up) ===
Legend ATP Challenger Tour (2–1)

Result	W–L	Date	Tournament	Tier	Surface	Opponent	Score
Win	1–0	Dec 2021	Rio de Janeiro, Brazil	Challenger	Hard	(Spain) Nicolás Álvarez Varona	3–6, 6–3, 7–6^{(7–3)}
Win	2–0	Jun 2022	Oeiras III, Portugal	Challenger	Clay	(Belgium) Kimmer Coppejans	6–2, 6–4
Loss	2–1	Nov 2025	Yokahoma Keio Challenger, Japan	Challenger	Hard	(Japan) Rei Sakamoto	6–4, 6–7^{(4–7)}, 4–6

=== Doubles: 11 (4 titles, 7 runner-ups) ===
Legend ATP Challenger Tour (4–7)	Finals by surface Hard (2–5) Clay (2–2)

Result	W–L	Date	Tournament	Tier	Surface	Partner	Opponents	Score
Loss	0–1	May 2022	Shymkent, Kazakhstan	Challenger	Clay	(Germany) Sebastian Fanselow	(Switzerland) Antoine Bellier (Brazil) Gabriel Décamps	6–7^{(3–7)}, 3–6
Loss	0–2	May 2022	Shymkent II, Kazakhstan	Challenger	Clay	(Denmark) Mikael Torpegaard	(Uzbekistan) Sanjar Fayziev (Greece) Markos Kalovelonis	7–6^{(7–3)}, 4–6, [4–10]
Loss	0–3	Jun 2022	Orlando, USA	Challenger	Hard	(Tunisia) Malek Jaziri	(South Korea) Chung Yun-seong (Greece) Michail Pervolarakis	7–6^{(7–5)}, 6–7^{(3–7)}, [14–16]
Win	1–3	Oct 2022	Seoul, South Korea	Challenger	Hard	(Chinese Taipei) Wu Tung-lin	(South Korea) Chung Yun-seong (United States) Aleksandar Kovacevic	6–7^{(2–7)}, 7–5, [11–9]
Win	2–3	Apr 2024	Porto Alegre, Brazil	Challenger	Clay	(Dominican Republic) Roberto Cid Subervi	(Australia) Patrick Harper (United Kingdom) David Stevenson	5–7, 7–6^{(7–1)}, [10–6]
Loss	2–4	Jul 2024	Winnipeg, Canada	Challenger	Hard	(Japan) Yuta Shimizu	(United States) Christian Harrison (United States) Cannon Kingsley	1–6, 4–6
Win	3–4	Aug 2024	Zhangjiagang, China	Challenger	Hard	(Japan) Takeru Yuzuki	(Philippines) Francis Alcantara (Thailand) Pruchya Isaro	6–1, 7–5
Loss	3–5	Nov 2024	Kobe, Japan	Challenger	Hard (i)	(Japan) Takeru Yuzuki	(United States) Vasil Kirkov (Netherlands) Bart Stevens	6–7^{(7–9)}, 5–7
Loss	3–6	Jan 2025	Oeiras, Portugal	Challenger	Hard (i)	(Kazakhstan) Denis Yevseyev	(United States) George Goldhoff (United States) Trey Hilderbrand	5–7, 6–2, [5–10]
Win	4−6	Jun 2025	Lyon, France	Challenger	Clay	(Chinese Taipei) Hsu Yu-hsiou	(France) Luca Sanchez (Japan) Seita Watanabe	1–6, 6–3, [12–10]
Loss	4–7	Oct 2026	Ningbo, China	Challenger	Hard	(Chinese Taipei) Hsieh Cheng-peng	(Japan) Akira Santillan (China) Zheng Baoluo	3–6, 5–7

== ITF Futures/World Tennis Tour finals ==
=== Singles: 23 (13 titles, 10 runner-ups) ===
Legend ITF Futures/WTT (13–10)	Finals by surface Hard (7–6) Clay (6–4) Grass (0–0) Carpet (0–0)

Result	W–L	Date	Tournament	Tier	Surface	Opponent	Score
Win	1–0	Aug 2014	Korea F12, Ansung	Futures	Clay	(South Korea) Hong Chung	6–4, 7–5
Win	2–0	Jun 2015	USA F17, Buffalo	Futures	Clay	(Argentina) Maximiliano Estévez	6–4, 6–1
Loss	2–1	May 2016	Sweden F1, Karlskrona	Futures	Clay	(Sweden) Carl Söderlund	1–6, 2–6
Loss	2–2	May 2016	Sweden F2, Båstad	Futures	Clay	(Belgium) Julien Cagnina	4–6, 6–3, 2–6
Win	3–2	Jun 2016	USA F20, Rochester	Futures	Clay	(Colombia) Juan Manuel Benítez Chavarriaga	6–4, 6–4
Loss	3–3	Jul 2016	USA F22, Pittsburgh	Futures	Clay	(New Zealand) Rubin Statham	3–6, 6–2, 2–6
Loss	3–4	May 2017	USA F16, Tampa	Futures	Clay	(Argentina) Facundo Mena	4–6, 7–6^{(7–4)}, 0–6
Win	4–4	Jul 2017	USA F22, Pittsburgh	Futures	Clay	(United States) Nathan Pasha	3–6, 7–6^{(7–5)}, 6–4
Win	5–4	Sep 2017	Canada F7, Toronto	Futures	Hard	(United States) Dennis Nevolo	7–6^{(8–6)}, 3–6, 6–1
Loss	5–5	Dec 2017	USA F40, Tallahassee	Futures	Hard	(United States) Ryan Shane	6–7^{(3–7)}, 1–6
Loss	5–6	Dec 2020	M15 Monastir, Tunisia	WTT	Hard	(Tunisia) Skander Mansouri	4–6, 6–7^{(3–7)}
Win	6–6	Jan 2021	M15 Monastir, Tunisia	WTT	Hard	(Austria) Alexander Erler	6–4, 6–2
Win	7–6	Mar 2021	M25 Vale do Lobo, Portugal	WTT	Hard	(Germany) Sebastian Fanselow	5–7, 7–6^{(7–3)}, 7–6^{(7–5)}
Win	8–6	Oct 2021	M25 Loulé, Portugal	WTT	Hard	(Germany) Lucas Gerch	6–4, 6–4
Win	9–6	Apr 2024	M15 Quillota, Chile	WTT	Clay	(Chile) Ignacio António Becerra Otarola	6–3, 6–4
Win	10–6	May 2024	M25 Trelew, Argentina	WTT	Hard	(Chile) Matías Soto	4–6, 6–1, 6–0
Win	11–6	May 2024	M15 Karuizawa, Japan	WTT	Clay	(Japan) Sora Fukuda	6–7^{(4–7)}, 7–5, 6–2
Win	12–6	Jun 2024	M25 Changwon, South Korea	WTT	Hard	(Japan) Masamichi Imamura	6–2, 5–7, 6–3
Loss	12–7	Jul 2025	M15 Nakhon Pathom, Thailand	WTT	Hard	(South Korea) Kwon Soon-woo	2–6, 2–6
Loss	12–8	Aug 2025	M25 Sapporo, Japan	WTT	Hard	(United Kingdom) Charles Broom	6–7^{(4–7)}, 5–7
Loss	12–9	Sep 2025	M25 Sapporo, Japan	WTT	Hard	(Japan) Renta Tokuda	3–6, 6–1, 4–6
Win	13–9	Sep 2025	M25 Takasaki, Japan	WTT	Hard	(Japan) Hikaru Shiraishi	6–4, 6–3
Loss	13–10	Oct 2025	M25 Perth, Australia	WTT	Hard	(Australia) Marc Polmans	6–3, 4–6, 6–7^{(6–8)}

=== Doubles: 20 (13 titles, 7 runner-ups) ===
Legend ITF Futures/WTT (13–7)	Finals by surface Hard (11–5) Clay (2–2) Grass (0–0) Carpet (0–0)

Result	W–L	Date	Tournament	Tier	Surface	Partner	Opponents	Score
Win	1–0	Sep 2013	Mexico F15, Quintana Roo	Futures	Hard	(Mexico) César Ramírez	(Puerto Rico) Alex Llompart (New Zealand) Finn Tearney	7–6^{(7–5)}, 6–4
Loss	1–1	Jul 2014	Korea F8, Gimcheon	Futures	Hard	(Japan) Yusuke Watanuki	(South Korea) Kim Yu-Seob (South Korea) Lim Hyung-Chan	4–6, 2–6
Win	2–1	Aug 2014	Korea F10, Chuncheon	Futures	Hard	(Japan) Yusuke Watanuki	(South Korea) Kim Jae Hwan (South Korea) Lee Jea Moon	6–3, 6–2
Win	3–1	Oct 2014	Turkey F35, Antalya	Futures	Hard	(Japan) Takashi Saito	(Turkey) Tuna Altuna (Bulgaria) Dimitar Kuzmanov	7–5, 6–3
Loss	3–2	Nov 2014	Thailand F10, Bangkok	Futures	Hard	(Australia) Jacob Grills	(Thailand) Pruchya Isaro (Thailand) Nuttanon Kadchapanan	2–6, 1–6
Win	4–2	Sep 2015	Canada F10, Toronto	Futures	Hard	(Serbia) Marko Tepavac	(United States) Nathan Pasha (United States) Raymond Sarmiento	2–6, 6–4, [10–8]
Loss	4–3	Sep 2015	Canada F11, Markham	Futures	Hard	(Serbia) Marko Tepavac	(United States) Nathan Pasha (United States) Raymond Sarmiento	6–7^{(4–7)}, 2–6
Win	5–3	Nov 2015	Colombia F9, Valledupar	Futures	Hard	(Mexico) Daniel Garza	(Mexico) Manuel Sánchez (Bolivia) Federico Zeballos	7–6^{(7–3)}, 5–7, [10–8]
Loss	5–4	Dec 2015	Qatar F4, Doha	Futures	Hard	(United Kingdom) Luke Bambridge	(Belgium) Laurens Verboven (Belgium) Joris De Loore	4–6, 6–3, [7–10]
Win	6–4	Jan 2016	USA F4, Sunrise	Futures	Clay	(Sweden) Isak Arvidsson	(Hungary) Péter Nagy (Canada) Denis Shapovalov	6–4, 6–4
Loss	6–5	Jan 2016	USA F5, Weston	Futures	Clay	(Sweden) Isak Arvidsson	(United States) Junior Alexander Ore (United States) Hunter Reese	6–7^{(4–7)}, 6–3, [8–10]
Win	7–5	Mar 2016	Canada F1, Gatineau	Futures	Hard	(United States) Stefan Kozlov	(Slovakia) Adrian Sikora (Germany) Sebastian Fanselow	7–6^{(7–5)}, 6–3
Win	8–5	Jun 2016	USA F19, Buffalo	Futures	Clay	(Mexico) Hans Hach	(United Kingdom) Farris Fathi Gosea (United States) Tim Kopinski	6–2, 6–3
Loss	8–6	Jun 2016	USA F20, Rochester	Futures	Clay	(South Africa) Damon Gooch	(Mexico) Hans Hach (Australia) Gavin Van Peperzeel	6–7^{(5–7)}, 2–6
Win	9–6	May 2017	China F7, Wuhan	Futures	Hard	(Japan) Shintaro Imai	(China) Xin Gao (China) Zhe Li	4–6, 6–4, [10–8]
Win	10–6	Jun 2017	China F9, Lu'an	Futures	Hard	(Australia) Harry Bourchier	(Chinese Taipei) Lo Chien Hsun (China) Sheng Hau Zhou	6–3, 7–5
Win	11–6	Sep 2017	Canada F5, Calgary	Futures	Hard	(Dominican Republic) Roberto Cid Subervi	(United States) Henry Craig (United States) Deiton Baughman	3–6, 6–3, [10–8]
Win	12–6	Mar 2025	M25 Lu'an, China	WTT	Hard	(Japan) Taisei Ichikawa	(Chinese Taipei) Hsieh Cheng-peng (China) Tang Sheng	4–6, 6–3, [10–8]
Win	13–6	Mar 2025	M25 Shenzhen, China	WTT	Hard	(Japan) Taisei Ichikawa	(Switzerland) Luca Castelnuovo (Australia) Akira Santillan	6–4, 6–7^{(5–7)}, [10–7]
Loss	13–7	May 2025	M25 Tbilisi, Georgia	WTT	Hard	(New Zealand) Ajeet Rai	(Georgia (country)) Aleksandre Bakshi (Slovakia) Lukáš Pokorný	2–6, 4–6
