= Yannick Hanfmann =

German tennis player (born 1991)

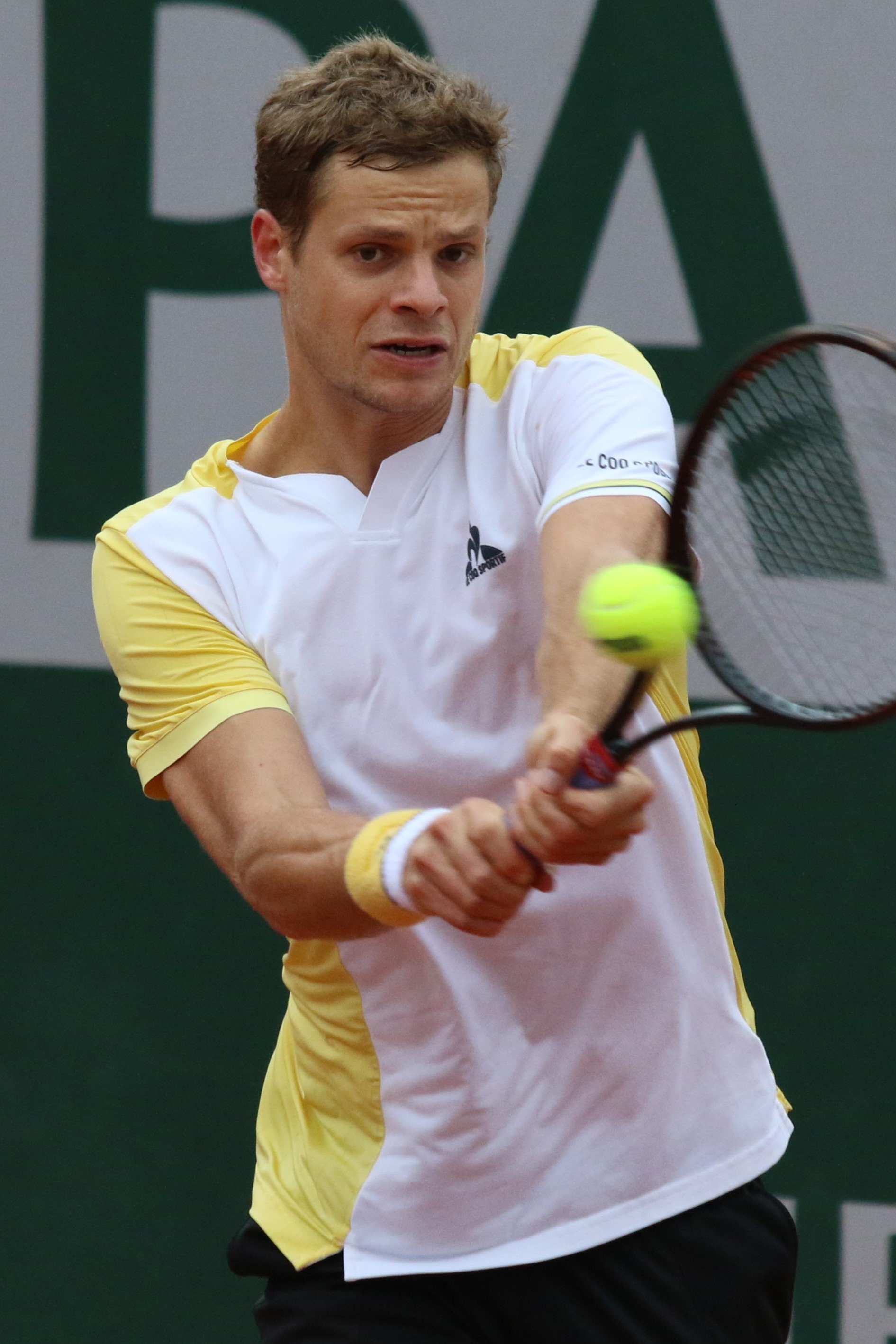
- Hanfmann at the 2023 French Open
- Country (sports): Germany
- Residence: Antwerp, Belgium
- Born: 13 November 1991 (age 34) Karlsruhe, Germany
- Height: 1.93 m (6 ft 4 in)
- Turned pro: 2015
- Plays: Right-handed (two-handed backhand)
- College: University of Southern California
- Coach: Petar Popović
- Prize money: US $4,813,002

Singles
- Career record: 109–108
- Career titles: 0
- Highest ranking: No. 45 (3 July 2023)
- Current ranking: No. 67 (9 November 2026)

Grand Slam singles results
- Australian Open: 2R (2022, 2026)
- French Open: 2R (2023)
- Wimbledon: 2R (2026)
- US Open: 1R (2018, 2021, 2023, 2026)

Doubles
- Career record: 18–20
- Career titles: 1
- Highest ranking: No. 81 (15 July 2024)
- Current ranking: No. 280 (31 August 2026)

Grand Slam doubles results
- Australian Open: SF (2024)
- French Open: 2R (2024)
- Wimbledon: 1R (2023, 2026)

Team competitions
- Davis Cup: SF (2024, 2025)
- Last updated on: 31 August 2026.

Yannick Hanfmann (born 13 November 1991) is a German professional tennis player. He has a career-high ATP singles ranking of world No. 45 achieved on 3 July 2023 and a best doubles ranking of No. 81, reached on 15 July 2024. He is currently the No. 2 German singles player. Hanfmann won the ATP Tour doubles title at the 2026 Stuttgart Open, with compatriot Jan-Lennard Struff.

Hanfmann played college tennis at the University of Southern California.

== Career ==
=== 2016–2017: First ATP final ===
Hanfmann made his ATP main-draw debut at the 2017 BMW Open after defeating Arthur De Greef and Uladzimir Ignatik in the qualifying rounds. Ranked world No. 273, he upset both Gerald Melzer and Thomaz Bellucci to reach the quarterfinals, where he lost to second seed Roberto Bautista Agut.

At the 2017 Swiss Open Gstaad, Hanfmann made a sensational run to the final after defeating Facundo Bagnis, third seed and defending champion Feliciano López, eighth seed João Sousa and sixth seed Robin Haase, again as a qualifier. In his semifinal victory over Haase he saved four match points. He lost to Fabio Fognini in the final.

=== 2018–2019: Major debut at US & French Open, top 100 ===
He reached the top 100 at world No. 99 on 16 July 2018, following his Challenger title in Braunschweig, Germany.

=== 2020–2021: ATP final, top-10 win, Australian, Wimbledon & Masters debuts ===
Hanfmann reached his second career ATP Tour final at the 2020 Generali Open Kitzbühel in Austria, but lost in straight sets to Serbian Miomir Kecmanović.

He recorded his maiden top-10 win against Gaël Monfils in the first round of the 2020 Hamburg European Open in Germany.

He made his debut at the 2021 Australian Open and at a Masters 1000 level at the Miami Open where he defeated Steve Johnson.

=== 2022: First major win, fourth ATP semifinal, out of top 100 ===
At the 2022 Australian Open, he won his first match at a Grand Slam event defeating wildcard Thanasi Kokkinakis.

He skipped the clay season in Europe and was unable to qualify for the French Open and Wimbledon and as a result his ranking dropped to No. 152 on 18 July 2022.

Following Wimbledon he reached the round of 16 at the Swiss Open as a qualifier. At Kitzbühel, he reached his fourth ATP semifinal overall and second at this tournament defeating Dominic Thiem for one of the biggest wins in his career.

=== 2023: Tenth clay court & first Masters quarterfinals, top 50 ===
At the Chile Open, he reached his ninth quarterfinal on clay and of his career as a qualifier defeating two Spaniards, defending champion Pedro Martínez and Roberto Carballés Baena.

At the 2023 U.S. Men's Clay Court Championships, he reached his tenth clay-court quarterfinal as a qualifier defeating Yosuke Watanuki and second seed Tommy Paul, his biggest win in three years. Next he reached his fifth ATP semifinal defeating Tomáš Macháč. He lost to Tomás Martín Etcheverry in straight sets. As a result, he rose close to 25 positions into the top 110, on 10 April 2023.

At the Madrid Open, on his main draw debut as a qualifier, he reached the third round on a Masters level for the first time in his career and in only his second Masters participation, defeating Juan Pablo Varillas and 15th seed Lorenzo Musetti.

Ranked No. 101 at the Italian Open on his debut at the tournament, also as a qualifier, he reached the third round defeating Nicolas Jarry and ninth seed Taylor Fritz for his first top-10 win of the season and only second in his career. Next, he defeated Marco Cecchinato to reach his first Masters fourth round and sixth seed Andrey Rublev, his third career top-10 win, to reach his first Masters quarterfinal. He lost to world No. 3, Daniil Medvedev, in straight sets. As a result, he moved close to 40 positions up to a new career-high singles ranking of world No. 64, on 22 May 2023. As the second qualifying seed, he entered the main draw of the 2023 French Open as a lucky loser and defeated Thiago Monteiro in the first round in five sets for his first win at this major.

At his home tournament, the Halle Open, he reached the second round as a wildcard defeating compatriot Louis Wessels. As a result, he moved into the top 50 in the rankings at world No. 48, on 26 June 2023. At the next grass court tournament, the Mallorca Championships, he reached the semifinals defeating the top seed Stefanos Tsitsipas and retiring wildcard Feliciano López. He lost his semifinal match to Adrian Mannarino. Hanfmann improved his career-high ranking to No. 45 on 3 July 2023.

=== 2024: Grand Slam semifinal in doubles ===
With his compatriot Dominik Koepfer Hanfmann reached the semifinals of the 2024 Australian Open as an unseeded pair, in only his second participation in the doubles competition at this Major, and third overall at Grand Slams.

He lost to eventual semifinalist Novak Djokovic at the 2024 Geneva Open.

=== 2025–2026: Masters third round, doubles title, 100th win ===
At the 2025 Rolex Shanghai Masters Hanfmann reached the third round as a qualifier before falling again to eventual semifinalist Novak Djokovic.

At the 2026 Chile Open Hanfmann reached his third career final, and first in six years, defeating top seed Francisco Cerúndolo. He lost to Luciano Darderi in the final. As a result he returned to the top 65 on 2 March 2026 in the ATP singles rankings.

Hanfmann recorded his 100th career win at the 2026 Halle Open upsetting world No. 25 João Fonseca.

== Personal life ==
Hanfmann is hearing-impaired, having been so since birth.

== Performance timelines ==
Key
W	F	SF	QF	#R	RR	Q#	P#	DNQ	A	Z#	PO	G	S	B	NMS	NTI	P	NH

(W) winner; (F) finalist; (SF) semifinalist; (QF) quarterfinalist; (#R) rounds 4, 3, 2, 1; (RR) round-robin stage; (Q#) qualification round; (P#) preliminary round; (DNQ) did not qualify; (A) absent; (Z#) Davis/Fed Cup Zonal Group (with number indication) or (PO) play-off; (G) gold, (S) silver or (B) bronze Olympic/Paralympic medal; (NMS) not a Masters tournament; (NTI) not a Tier I tournament; (P) postponed; (NH) not held; (SR) strike rate (events won / competed); (W–L) win–loss record.
To avoid confusion and double counting, these charts are updated at the conclusion of a tournament or when the player's participation has ended.

=== Singles ===
Current through the 2026 Stockholm Open.

Tournament	2015	2016	2017	2018	2019	2020	2021	2022	2023	2024	2025	2026	SR	W–L	Win %
Grand Slam tournaments
Australian Open	A	A	A	Q2	A	Q2	1R	2R	1R	1R	1R	2R	0 / 6	2–6	25%
French Open	A	A	A	Q2	1R	A	1R	Q1	2R	1R	1R	1R	0 / 6	1–6	14%
Wimbledon	A	A	Q2	Q1	Q3	NH	1R	Q2	1R	1R	Q2	2R	0 / 4	1–4	20%
US Open	A	A	Q2	1R	Q1	A	1R	Q1	1R	Q1	Q1	1R	0 / 4	0–4	0%
Win–loss	0–0	0–0	0–0	0–1	0–1	0–0	0–4	1–1	1–4	0–3	0–2	2–4	0 / 20	4–20	17%
National representation
Davis Cup	A	A	PO	A	A	A	A	A	G1	SF	SF	Q1	0 / 1	6–1	86%
ATP 1000 tournaments
Indian Wells Open	Q2	A	A	Q1	A	NH	A	A	A	2R	A	A	0 / 1	1–1	50%
Miami Open	A	A	A	Q1	A	NH	2R	A	Q1	3R	Q1	1R	0 / 3	3–3	50%
Monte-Carlo Masters	A	A	A	A	A	NH	Q2	A	A	1R	Q1	A	0 / 1	0–1	0%
Madrid Open	A	A	A	A	A	NH	A	A	3R	1R	Q1	2R	0 / 3	3–3	50%
Italian Open	A	A	A	A	A	A	A	A	QF	2R	Q2	2R	0 / 3	6–3	67%
Canadian Open	A	A	A	A	A	NH	A	A	A	A	A	3R	0 / 1	2–1	67%
Cincinnati Open	A	A	A	A	A	A	A	A	1R	A	A	2R	0 / 2	1–2	33%
Shanghai Masters	A	A	A	A	A	NH			2R	Q1	3R	2R	0 / 3	4–3	57%
Paris Masters	A	A	A	A	A	Q2	A	A	Q1	A	Q2	Q2	0 / 0	0–0	–
Win–loss	0–0	0–0	0–0	0–0	0–0	0–0	1–1	0–0	7–4	4–5	2–1	6–6	0 / 17	20–17	54%
Career statistics
	2015	2016	2017	2018	2019	2020	2021	2022	2023	2024	2025	2026	Career		
Tournaments	0	0	4	6	2	3	13	7	22	21	13	23	Career total: 114		
Titles	0	0	0	0	0	0	0	0	0	0	0	0	Career total: 0		
Finals	0	0	1	0	0	1	0	0	0	0	0	1	Career total: 3		
Hard win–loss	0–0	0–0	0–0	0–2	0–0	0–0	2–6	1–2	3–9	9–6	8–6	6–9	0 / 40	29–40	42%
Clay win–loss	0–0	0–0	6–4	1–4	0–2	7–3	6–3	6–5	16–10	10–12	4–5	14–9	0 / 58	70–57	55%
Grass win–loss	0–0	0–0	1–1	0–0	0–0	0–0	1–3	0–0	4–3	1–3	0–2	4–4	0 / 16	11–16	41%
Overall win–loss	0–0	0–0	7–5	1–6	0–2	7–3	9–12	7–7	23–22	20–21	12–13	24–22	0 / 114	110–113	49%
Year-end ranking	660	315	119	152	172	99	126	128	51	96	104				

=== Doubles ===
Current through the 2026 Cincinnati Open.

Tournament	2018	2019	2020	2021	2022	2023	2024	2025	2026	SR	W–L
Grand Slam tournaments
Australian Open	A	A	A	2R	A	A	SF	A	A	0 / 2	5–2
French Open	A	A	A	A	A	A	2R	A	A	0 / 1	1–0
Wimbledon	A	A	NH	A	A	1R	A	A	1R	0 / 2	0–1
US Open	A	A	A	A	A	A	A	A		0 / 0	0–0
Win–loss	0–0	0–0	0–0	1–1	0–0	0–1	5–1	0–0	0–0	0 / 5	6–3
ATP 1000 tournaments
Canadian Open	A	A	NH	A	A	A	A	A	1R	0 / 1	0–1
Cincinnati Open	A	A	A	A	A	A	A	A	1R	0 / 1	0–1
Career statistics
Tournaments	1	0	1	5	2	2	8	1	5	25	
Titles	0	0	0	0	0	0	0	0	1	1	
Finals	0	0	0	0	0	0	0	0	1	1	
Overall win–loss	0–1	0–0	0–1	5–3	1–2	0–2	9–7	0–1	3–3	18–20	
Year-end ranking	251	–	886	289	563	880	85	–		47%	

== ATP Tour finals ==
=== Singles: 3 (3 runner-ups) ===
Legend Grand Slam (–) ATP 1000 (–) ATP 500 (–) ATP 250 (0–3)	Finals by surface Hard (–) Clay (0–3) Grass (–)	Finals by setting Outdoor (0–3) Indoor (–)

Result	W–L	Date	Tournament	Tier	Surface	Opponent	Score
Loss	0–1	Jul 2017	Swiss Open Gstaad, Switzerland	ATP 250	Clay	(Italy) Fabio Fognini	4–6, 5–7
Loss	0–2	Sep 2020	Austrian Open Kitzbühel, Austria	ATP 250	Clay	(Serbia) Miomir Kecmanović	4–6, 4–6
Loss	0–3	Feb 2026	Chile Open, Chile	ATP 250	Clay	(Italy) Luciano Darderi	6–7^{(6–8)}, 5–7

=== Doubles: 1 (title) ===
Legend Grand Slam (–) ATP 1000 (–) ATP 500 (–) ATP 250 (1–0)	Finals by surface Hard (–) Clay (–) Grass (1–0)	Finals by setting Outdoor (1–0) Indoor (–)

Result	W–L	Date	Tournament	Tier	Surface	Partner	Opponents	Score
Win	1–0	Jun 2026	Stuttgart Open, Germany	ATP 250	Grass	(Germany) Jan-Lennard Struff	(Estonia) Daniil Glinka (Greece) Stefanos Sakellaridis	7–6^{(7–2)}, 3–6, [11–9]

== ATP Challenger finals ==
=== Singles: 10 (7 titles, 3 runner-ups) ===
Finals by surface
Hard (0–1)
Clay (6–2)
Carpet (1–0)

Result	W–L	Date	Tournament	Surface	Opponent	Score
Loss	0–1	May 2017	Shymkent, Kazakhstan	Clay	(Lithuania) Ričardas Berankis	3–6, 2–6
Win	1–1	Oct 2017	Ismaning, Germany	Carpet (i)	(Italy) Lorenzo Sonego	6–4, 3–6, 7–5
Win	2–1	Jun 2018	Shymkent, Kazakhstan	Clay	(Dominican Republic) Roberto Cid Subervi	7–6^{(7–3)}, 4–6, 6–2
Win	3–1	Jul 2018	Braunschweig, Germany	Clay	(Slovakia) Jozef Kovalík	6–2, 3–6, 6–3
Win	4–1	Jul 2019	Ludwigshafen, Germany	Clay	(Slovakia) Filip Horanský	6–3, 6–1
Win	5–1	Aug 2019	Augsburg, Germany	Clay	(Finland) Emil Ruusuvuori	2–6, 6–4, 7–5
Loss	5–2	Feb 2020	Burnie, Australia	Hard	(Japan) Taro Daniel	2–6, 2–6
Win	6–2	Aug 2020	Todi, Italy	Clay	(Spain) Bernabé Zapata Miralles	6–3, 6–3
Loss	6–3	Oct 2022	Rio de Janeiro, Brazil	Clay	(Italy) Marco Cecchinato	6–4, 4–6, 3–6
Win	7–3	Aug 2025	Hagen, Germany	Clay	(Netherlands) Guy den Ouden	3–6, 6–2, 6–2

=== Doubles: 2 (2 titles) ===
Finals by surface
Hard (–)
Clay (2–0)

Result	W–L	Date	Tournament	Surface	Partner	Opponents	Score
Win	1–0	Apr 2018	Panama City, Panama	Clay	(Germany) Kevin Krawietz	(United States) Nathan Pasha (Ecuador) Roberto Quiroz	7–6^{(7–4)}, 6–4
Win	2–0	Apr 2018	Mexico City, Mexico	Clay	(Germany) Kevin Krawietz	(United Kingdom) Luke Bambridge (United Kingdom) Jonny O'Mara	6–2, 7–6^{(7–3)}

== ITF Tour finals ==
=== Singles: 8 (5 titles, 3 runner-ups) ===
Finals by surface
Hard (1–0)
Clay (4–3)

Result	W–L	Date	Tournament	Surface	Opponent	Score
Win	1–0	Aug 2014	Germany F12, Karlsruhe	Clay	(Germany) Jan Choinski	7–5, 6–1
Win	2–0	Aug 2015	Germany F11, Friedberg	Clay	(Australia) Gavin van Peperzeel	6–2, 6–2
Win	3–0	Jan 2016	US F2, Long Beach	Hard	(United States) Michael Mmoh	6–4, 6–0
Loss	3–1	Jul 2016	Austria F1, Telfs	Clay	(Portugal) Gonçalo Oliveira	6–7^{(4–7)}, 6–3, 1–6
Win	4–1	Jul 2016	Austria F2, Kramsach	Clay	(Greece) Stefanos Tsitsipas	6–4, 6–4
Win	5–1	Jul 2016	Germany F8, Kassel	Clay	(Germany) Julian Lenz	7–6^{(7–5)}, 6–1
Loss	5–2	Aug 2016	Italy F24, Cornaiano	Clay	(Germany) Jeremy Jahn	3–6, 2–6
Loss	5–3	Aug 2016	Germany F11, Karlsruhe	Clay	(Spain) Marc Giner	6–2, 1–6, 3–6

=== Doubles: 3 (2 titles, 1 runner-up) ===
Finals by surface
Hard (2–1)
Clay (–)

Result	W–L	Date	Tournament	Surface	Partner	Opponents	Score
Win	1–0	Jun 2013	Mexico F12, Quintana Roo	Hard	(Germany) Jonas Lütjen	(Mexico) Alejandro Figueroa (Brazil) José Pereira	6–7^{(2–7)}, 7–6^{(7–3)}, [10–8]
Loss	1–1	Sep 2015	France F18, Mulhouse	Hard (i)	(Germany) Moritz Baumann	(Netherlands) Sander Arends (Poland) Adam Majchrowicz	walkover
Win	2–1	Jan 2017	US F1, Los Angeles	Hard	(Ecuador) Roberto Quiroz	(United Kingdom) Luke Bambridge (United Kingdom) Joe Salisbury	3–6, 6–4, [10–8]

== Wins over top 10 players ==
- Hanfmann has a 5–21 record against players who were, at the time the match was played, ranked in the top 10.

Season	2020	2021	2022	2023	2024	2025	2026	Total
Wins	1	0	0	3	0	0	1	5

#	Player	Rk	Event	Surface	Rd	Score	Rk
2020
1.	(France) Gaël Monfils	9	Hamburg Open, Germany	Clay	1R	6–4, 6–3	103
2023
2.	(United States) Taylor Fritz	9	Italian Open, Italy	Clay	2R	6–4, 6–1	101
3.	Andrey Rublev	6	Italian Open, Italy	Clay	4R	7–6^{(7–5)}, 4–6, 6–3	101
4.	(Greece) Stefanos Tsitsipas	5	Mallorca Championships, Spain	Grass	2R	6–4, 3–6, 6–2	48
2026
5.	(Italy) Flavio Cobolli	9	Canadian Open, Canada	Hard	2R	7–6^{(7–5)}, 7–6^{(7–2)}	57

*As of 24 November 2025

== National representation ==
=== Davis Cup: 7 (6–1) ===
Group membership Finals (2–0) Qualifying round / Play-offs (3–1) World Group I (1–0)	Matches by type Singles (6–1) Doubles (0–0)	Matches by venue Germany (1–0) Away (3–1) Neutral (2–0)

Date	Venue	Surface	Rd	Opponent nation	Score	Match	Opponent player	W/L	Rubber score
2017
Sep 2017	Oeiras	Clay	PO	Portugal	3–2	Singles 5	João Domingues	Loss	3–6, 6–7^{(8–10)}
2023
Sep 2023	Mostar	Clay	WG1	(Bosnia and Herzegovina) Bosnia & Herzeg.	4–0	Singles 2	Damir Džumhur	Win	6–2, 6–1
2024
Sep 2024	Zhuhai	Hard (i)	RR	Slovakia	3–0	Singles 2	Jozef Kovalík	Win	3–6, 6–3, 7–6^{(7–3)}
Sep 2024	Zhuhai	Hard (i)	RR	Chile	3–0	Singles 2	Alejandro Tabilo	Win	7–5, 6–4
2025
Feb 2025	Vilnius	Hard (i)	Q1	Israel	3–1	Singles 2	Daniel Cukierman	Win	6–4, 6–4
Sep 2025	Tokyo	Hard (i)	Q2	Japan	4–0	Singles 2	Shintaro Mochizuki	Win	6–3, 6–3
2026
Feb 2026	Düsseldorf	Hard (i)	Q1	Peru	4–0	Singles 1	Gonzalo Bueno	Win	6–4, 6–4
