= Roman Khassanov =

Kazakhstani tennis player

Roman Khassanov Роман Хасанов
- Full name: Roman Rashitovich Khassanov
- Country (sports): Kazakhstan
- Residence: Nur-Sultan, Kazakhstan
- Born: 7 September 1996 (age 29) Shymkent, Kazakhstan
- Height: 1.91 m (6 ft 3 in)
- Plays: Right-handed (two-handed backhand)
- Prize money: $36,940

Singles
- Career record: 0–1 (at ATP Tour level, Grand Slam level, and in Davis Cup)
- Career titles: 0
- Highest ranking: No. 671 (7 May 2018)

Doubles
- Career record: 0–0 (at ATP Tour level, Grand Slam level, and in Davis Cup)
- Career titles: 0
- Highest ranking: No. 686 (22 May 2017)

Team competitions
- Davis Cup: 0–1

Roman Rashitovich Khassanov (Russian: Роман Рашитович Хасанов; born 7 September 1996) is a Kazakhstani tennis player.

Khassanov has a career high ATP singles ranking of 671 achieved on 7 May 2018. He also has a career high ATP doubles ranking of 686 achieved on 22 May 2017.

Khassanov represents Kazakhstan at the Davis Cup, where he has a W/L record of 0–1.

== Future and Challenger finals ==
=== Singles: 1 (1–0) ===
Legend
Challengers 0 (0–0)
Futures 1 (1–0)

Outcome	No.	Date	Tournament	Surface	Opponent	Score
Winner	1.	September 2, 2017	Kyiv, Ukraine F4	Clay	(Ukraine) Artem Smirnov	6–4, 6–2

=== Doubles 5 (1–4) ===
Legend
Challengers 0 (0–0)
Futures 5 (1–4)

Outcome	No.	Date	Tournament	Surface	Partner	Opponents	Score
Runner-up	1.	May 28, 2016	Andijan, Uzbekistan F3	Hard	(Russia) Vitaly Kozyukov	(India) Sriram Balaji (Russia) Markos Kalovelonis	3–6, 4–6
Runner-up	2.	September 24, 2016	Shymkent, Kazakhstan F5	Clay	(Uzbekistan) Jurabek Karimov	(Russia) Mikhail Fufygin (Estonia) Vladimir Ivanov	5–7, 2–6
Runner-up	3.	October 8, 2016	Shymkent, Kazakhstan F7	Clay	(Russia) Ivan Davydov	(Russia) Alexander Pavlioutchenkov (Georgia (country)) George Tsivadze	1–6, 4–6
Runner-up	4.	April 29, 2017	Shymkent, Kazakhstan F5	Clay	(Russia) Ivan Gakhov	(Russia) Alexander Pavlioutchenkov (Serbia) Danilo Petrović	7–6^{(7–4)}, 0–6, [5–10]
Winner	5.	April 28, 2018	Shymkent, Kazakhstan F5	Clay	(Russia) Ivan Gakhov	(Ukraine) Oleksandr Bielinskyi (Russia) Yan Sabanin	5–7, 6–2, [11–9]
Runner-up	6.	July 15, 2018	(Georgia (country)) Telavi, Georgia F1	Clay	(Ukraine) Vladyslav Orlov	(Georgia (country)) Aleksandre Bakshi (Georgia (country)) George Tsivadze	6–7^{(4–7)}, 3–6

== Davis Cup ==
=== Participations: (0–1) ===
Group membership World Group (0–1) WG Play-off (0–0) Group I (0–0) Group II (0–0) Group III (0–0) Group IV (0–0)	Matches by surface Hard (0–1) Clay (0–0) Grass (0–0) Carpet (0–0)	Matches by type Singles (0–1) Doubles (0–0)

- ▲ ▼ indicates the outcome of the Davis Cup match followed by the score, date, place of event, the zonal classification and its phase, and the court surface.

Rubber outcome	No.	Rubber	Match type (partner if any)	Opponent nation	Opponent player(s)	Score
▲4–1; 2–4 February 2018; National Tennis Centre, Astana, Kazakhstan; World Group First round; Hard (indoor) surface
Defeat	1	IV	Singles (dead rubber)	Switzerland	Marc-Andrea Hüsler	3–6, 1–6
