= Shymkent Challenger =

- 2026 Shymkent Challenger II

Tournament information
- Event name: Shymkent Challenger
- Location: Shymkent, Kazakhstan
- Venue: National Tennis Center Beeline Arena
- Category: ATP Challenger Tour
- Surface: Clay
- Draw: 32S/24Q/16D

The Shymkent Challenger is a professional tennis tournament played on clay courts. It is currently part of the Association of Tennis Professionals (ATP) Challenger Tour. It is held in Shymkent, Kazakhstan since 2017 until 2019, and in 2022 and after a three year hiatus it came back in 2026.

Andrej Martin and Sergey Fomin won the singles tournament two times.

== Past finals ==
=== Singles ===
Year	Champion	Runner-up	Score
2026 (2)	(Belgium) Buvaysar Gadamauri	(India) Manas Dhamne	7–6^{(8–6)}, 6–4
2026 (1)	(Uzbekistan) Sergey Fomin (2)	(Kazakhstan) Timofey Skatov	6–3, 7–5
2023–2025	Not held		
2022 (2)	(Uzbekistan) Sergey Fomin (1)	(Netherlands) Robin Haase	7–6^{(7–4)}, 6–3
2022 (1)	(United States) Emilio Nava	(Germany) Sebastian Fanselow	6–4, 7–6^{(7–3)}
2020–2021	Not held		
2019 (2)	(Slovakia) Andrej Martin (2)	(Italy) Stefano Travaglia	6–4, 6–4
2019 (1)	(Slovakia) Andrej Martin (1)	(Kazakhstan) Dmitry Popko	5–7, 6–4, 6–4
2018	(Germany) Yannick Hanfmann	(Dominican Republic) Roberto Cid Subervi	7–6^{(7–3)}, 4–6, 6–2
2017	(Lithuania) Ričardas Berankis	(Germany) Yannick Hanfmann	6–3, 6–2

=== Doubles ===
Year	Champions	Runners-up	Score
2026 (2)	(Croatia) Admir Kalender (Croatia) Mili Poljičak	(Norway) Viktor Durasovic (Germany) Kai Wehnelt	6–2, 6–7^{(7–9)}, [10–5]
2026 (1)	(Germany) Max Hans Rehberg (Germany) Max Wiskandt	(United States) Dali Blanch; Svyatoslav Gulin	6–1, 5–7, [10–6]
2023–2025	Not held		
2022 (2)	(Uzbekistan) Sanjar Fayziev (Greece) Markos Kalovelonis	(Denmark) Mikael Torpegaard (Japan) Kaichi Uchida	6–7^{(3–7)}, 6–4, [10–4]
2022 (1)	(Switzerland) Antoine Bellier (Brazil) Gabriel Décamps	(Germany) Sebastian Fanselow (Japan) Kaichi Uchida	7–6^{(7–3)}, 6–3
2020–2021	Not held		
2019 (2)	(Serbia) Nikola Čačić (Chinese Taipei) Yang Tsung-hua	(Sweden) André Göransson (Switzerland) Marc-Andrea Hüsler	6–4, 6–4
2019 (1)	(Austria) Jurij Rodionov (Finland) Emil Ruusuvuori	(Portugal) Gonçalo Oliveira (Belarus) Andrei Vasilevski	6–4, 3–6, [10–8]
2018	(Italy) Lorenzo Giustino (Portugal) Gonçalo Oliveira	(Austria) Lucas Miedler (Austria) Sebastian Ofner	6–2, 7–6^{(7–4)}
2017	(Chile) Hans Podlipnik Castillo (Belarus) Andrei Vasilevski	(Belgium) Clément Geens (Argentina) Juan Pablo Paz	6–4, 6–2
