= 2019 Kiskút Open =

- Date: 14–20 October 2019
- Edition: 1st
- Category: ITF Women's World Tennis Tour
- Prize money: $60,000
- Surface: Clay / Indoor
- Location: Székesfehérvár, Hungary

Champions

Singles
- (Romania) Nicoleta Dascălu

Doubles
- (Romania) Irina Bara / (Belgium) Maryna Zanevska
Kiskút Open	· 2020 →

The 2019 Kiskút Open was a professional tennis tournament played on indoor clay courts. It was the inaugural edition of the tournament and part of the 2019 ITF Women's World Tennis Tour. It took place in Székesfehérvár, Hungary, from 14–20 October 2019.

== Singles main-draw entrants ==
=== Seeds ===
Country	Player	Rank^{1}	Seed
MNE	Danka Kovinić	104	1
ROU	Irina-Camelia Begu	115	2
UKR	Katarina Zavatska	117	3
POL	Katarzyna Kawa	128	4
BUL	Viktoriya Tomova	143	5
PAR	Verónica Cepede Royg	144	6
SVK	Kristína Kučová	145	7
SVK	Rebecca Šramková	173	8

- ^{1} Rankings were as of 7 October 2019.

=== Other entrants ===
The following players received wildcards into the singles main draw:

- (Hungary) Gréta Arn
- (Hungary) Dorka Drahota-Szabó
- (Hungary) Dalma Gálfi
- (Hungary) Adrienn Nagy

The following player received entry using a protected ranking:

- (Sweden) Susanne Celik

The following players received entry from the qualifying draw:

- (Croatia) Lea Bošković
- (Romania) Nicoleta Dascălu
- (Spain) Georgina García Pérez
- (Romania) Ilona Georgiana Ghioroaie
- (Slovenia) Nina Potočnik
- (Chile) Daniela Seguel
- (Switzerland) Simona Waltert
- (Belgium) Maryna Zanevska

== Champions ==
=== Singles ===
- (Romania) Nicoleta Dascălu def. (Romania) Irina Bara, 7–5, 6–2

=== Doubles ===
- (Romania) Irina Bara / (Belgium) Maryna Zanevska def. (Uzbekistan) Akgul Amanmuradova / (Romania) Elena Bogdan, 3–6, 6–2, [10–8]
