= 2023 Kiskút Open – Doubles =

Doubles
- 2023 Kiskút Open

Final
- Champions: Bogdan Bobrov (Uzbekistan) Sergey Fomin
- Runners-up: (Turkey) Sarp Ağabigün (Turkey) Ergi Kırkın
- Score: 6–2, 5–7, [11–9]

Events
| Singles | Doubles |
| Kiskút Open | · 2024 → |

This was the first edition of the tournament.

Bogdan Bobrov and Sergey Fomin won the title after defeating Sarp Ağabigün and Ergi Kırkın 6–2, 5–7, [11–9] in the final.

== Seeds ==
1. (Pakistan) Aisam-ul-Haq Qureshi / (India) Ramkumar Ramanathan (quarterfinals)
2. (Ukraine) Vladyslav Manafov / (Ukraine) Oleg Prihodko (quarterfinals)
3. (India) Purav Raja / (India) Divij Sharan (semifinals)
4. (Sweden) Filip Bergevi / (Greece) Petros Tsitsipas (quarterfinals)

== Draw ==
=== Key ===
- Q = Qualifier
- WC = Wild card
- LL = Lucky loser
- Alt = Alternate
- ITF = ITF entry
- PR = Protected ranking
- SR = Special ranking
- SE = Special exempt
- JE = Junior exempt
- JR = Junior Accelerator Programme entrant
- CO = College Accelerator Programme entrant
- NG = Next Gen Accelerator Program entrant
- w/o = Walkover
- r = Retired
- d = Defaulted

First round
(Turkey) S Ağabigün (Turkey) E Kırkın | 6 | 6
(Belgium) K Coppejans (Spain) N Sánchez Izquierdo | 2 | 2
4 | (Sweden) F Bergevi (Greece) Pe Tsitsipas | 4 | 6 | [10]
WC | (Hungary) Matyas Füle (Hungary) G Madarász | 6 | 3 | [8]
(Canada) S Diez (Czech Republic) M Vrbenský | 3 | 4
(France) M Guinard (Croatia) N Serdarušić | 6 | 6
WC | (Hungary) Attila Boros (Hungary) Botond Kisantal | 3 | 6 | [8]
Alt | (Japan) Rimpei Kawakami (Bosnia and Herzegovina) A Šetkić | 6 | 3 | [10]
(Uzbekistan) S Fayziev; I Gakhov | 3 | 6^{5}
B Bobrov (Uzbekistan) S Fomin | 6 | 7^{7}

Quarterfinals
1 | (Pakistan) A-u-H Qureshi (India) R Ramanathan | 6^{4} | 3
(Turkey) S Ağabigün (Turkey) E Kırkın | 7^{7} | 6
4 | (Sweden) F Bergevi (Greece) Pe Tsitsipas | 5 | 6^{1}
(France) M Guinard (Croatia) N Serdarušić | 7 | 7^{7}
Alt | (Japan) R Kawakami (Bosnia and Herzegovina) A Šetkić | 6 | 3 | [8]
3 | (India) P Raja (India) D Sharan | 3 | 6 | [10]
B Bobrov (Uzbekistan) S Fomin | 6 | 6
2 | (Ukraine) V Manafov (Ukraine) O Prihodko | 4 | 4

Semifinals
(Turkey) S Ağabigün (Turkey) E Kırkın | 6 | 2 | [10]
(France) M Guinard (Croatia) N Serdarušić | 1 | 6 | [4]
3 | (India) P Raja (India) D Sharan | 6^{3} | 3
B Bobrov (Uzbekistan) S Fomin | 7^{7} | 6

Final
(Turkey) S Ağabigün (Turkey) E Kırkın | 2 | 7 | [9]
B Bobrov (Uzbekistan) S Fomin | 6 | 5 | [11]
