= 2019 Kiskút Open II =

- Date: 21–27 October 2019
- Edition: 1st
- Category: ITF Women's World Tennis Tour
- Prize money: $100,000
- Surface: Clay / Indoor
- Location: Székesfehérvár, Hungary

Champions

Singles
- (Montenegro) Danka Kovinić

Doubles
- (Spain) Georgina García Pérez / (Hungary) Fanny Stollár
Kiskút Open	· 2020 →

The 2019 Kiskút Open II was a professional tennis tournament played on indoor clay courts. It was the first edition of the tournament which was part of the 2019 ITF Women's World Tennis Tour. It took place in Székesfehérvár, Hungary between 21 and 27 October 2019.

== Singles main-draw entrants ==
=== Seeds ===
Country	Player	Rank^{1}	Seed
ESP	Paula Badosa	95	1
ESP	Aliona Bolsova	104	2
MNE	Danka Kovinić	105	3
ROU	Irina-Camelia Begu	115	4
UKR	Katarina Zavatska	116	5
ROU	Patricia Maria Țig	117	6
ITA	Jasmine Paolini	119	7
GER	Tamara Korpatsch	124	8

- ^{1} Rankings are as of 14 October 2019.

=== Other entrants ===
The following players received wildcards into the singles main draw:

- (Hungary) Anna Bondár
- (Hungary) Dalma Gálfi
- (Hungary) Réka Luca Jani
- (Hungary) Fanny Stollár

The following player received entry using a protected ranking:

- (Sweden) Susanne Celik

The following player received entry as a special exempt:

- (Romania) Irina Bara

The following players received entry from the qualifying draw:

- (Hungary) Gréta Arn
- (Belgium) Marie Benoît
- (Romania) Miriam Bulgaru
- (Romania) Alexandra Cadanțu
- (Poland) Maja Chwalińska
- (Hungary) Dorka Drahota-Szabó
- (Romania) Ilona Georgiana Ghioroaie
- (Russia) Victoria Kan

== Champions ==
=== Singles ===
- (Montenegro) Danka Kovinić def. (Romania) Irina-Camelia Begu, 6–4, 3–6, 6–3

=== Doubles ===
- (Spain) Georgina García Pérez / (Hungary) Fanny Stollár def. (Slovenia) Nina Potočnik / (Slovenia) Nika Radišič, 6–1, 7–6^{(7–4)}
