= 2023 Kiskút Open =

- Date: 13–19 March
- Edition: 1st
- Surface: Clay (indoor)
- Location: Székesfehérvár, Hungary

Champions

Singles
- (Serbia) Hamad Međedović

Doubles
- Bogdan Bobrov / (Uzbekistan) Sergey Fomin
- Kiskút Open

The 2023 Kiskút Open was a professional tennis tournament played on indoor clay courts. It was the first edition of the tournament which was part of the 2023 ATP Challenger Tour. It took place in Székesfehérvár, Hungary between 13 and 19 March 2023.

== Singles main draw entrants ==
=== Seeds ===
Country	Player	Rank^{1}	Seed
HUN	Fábián Marozsán	163	1
ITA	Flavio Cobolli	165	2
FRA	Manuel Guinard	177	3
HUN	Zsombor Piros	179	4
BUL	Adrian Andreev	204	5
BIH	Damir Džumhur	208	6
~~SRB~~	~~Miljan Zekić~~	~~215~~	~~7~~
SRB	Hamad Međedović	217	8
FRA	Evan Furness	223	9

- ^{1} Rankings are as of 6 March 2023.

=== Other entrants ===
The following players received wildcards into the singles main draw:

- (Hungary) Péter Fajta
- (Hungary) Matyas Füle
- (Hungary) Gergely Madarász

The following player received entry into the singles main draw as an alternate:

- (Italy) Salvatore Caruso

The following players received entry from the qualifying draw:

- (Bosnia and Herzegovina) Mirza Bašić
- (Morocco) Elliot Benchetrit
- (Lebanon) Benjamin Hassan
- (Austria) Gerald Melzer
- (Italy) Julian Ocleppo
- (Ukraine) Oleg Prihodko

== Champions ==
=== Singles ===
- (Serbia) Hamad Međedović def. (Croatia) Nino Serdarušić 6–4, 6–3.

=== Doubles ===
- Bogdan Bobrov / (Uzbekistan) Sergey Fomin def. (Turkey) Sarp Ağabigün / (Turkey) Ergi Kırkın 6–2, 5–7, [11–9].
