= 2023 ITF Men's World Tennis Tour =

Entry-level tennis series

Details
- Duration: 3 January – December 2023
- Edition: 26th
- Categories: M25 tournaments M15 tournaments

Achievements (singles)
- Most titles: (Sweden) Dragoș Nicolae Mădăraș (10)
- Most finals: (Sweden) Dragoș Nicolae Mădăraș (14)

The 2023 International Tennis Federation (ITF) Men's World Tennis Tour is an entry-level tour for Men's professional tennis. It is organized by the International Tennis Federation and is a tier below the ATP Challenger Tour. The Men's Tour includes tournaments with prize money of either $US15,000 or $25,000. The results of ITF tournaments are incorporated into the ATP ranking, which enables professionals to progress to the ATP Challenger Tour and ATP Tour, and ultimately the Grand Slams. It offers approximately 570 tournaments across 68 countries.

Tournaments include reserved main draw places for Top 100-ranked ITF World Tennis Tour Juniors.

Since 2022, following the Russian invasion of Ukraine the ITF announced that players from Belarus and Russia could still play on the tour but would not be allowed to play under the flag of Belarus or Russia.

== Cancelled/postponed tournaments ==
The following tournaments were formally announced by the ITF before being subsequently cancelled or postponed due to the Gaza war, Turkey–Syria earthquakes or other reasons.

| Week of | Tournament | Status |
|---|---|---|
| February 13 | Antalya, Turkey; M25 – Clay | Cancelled due to 2023 Turkey–Syria earthquakes |
| April 17 | Orange Park, United States; M15 – Clay | Cancelled |
| April 17 | Shymkent, Kazakhstan; M15 – Clay | Cancelled |
| April 24 | Shymkent, Kazakhstan; M15 – Clay | Cancelled |
| June 5 | Harmon, Guam; M15 – Clay | Cancelled |
| June 12 | Bad Waltersdorf, Austria; M15 – Clay | Cancelled |
| July 24 | Castelo Branco, Portugal; M25 – Hard | Moved to July 17 |
| July 24 | Pärnu, Estonia; M15 – Clay | Cancelled |
| August 14 | Vigevano, Italy; M15 – Clay | Cancelled |
| August 14 | Craiova, Romania; M15 – Clay | Cancelled |
| August 28 | Padua, Italy; M15 – Clay | Cancelled |
| September 4 | Salerno, Italy; M15 – Clay | Cancelled |
| September 18 | Lubbock, United States; M15 – Hard | Cancelled |
| September 25 | Prostějov, Czech Republic; M25 – Clay | Cancelled |
| October 9 | Meitar, Israel; M25 – Hard | Cancelled due to Gaza war |
| October 16 | Jerusalem, Israel; M25 – Hard | Cancelled due to Gaza war |
| October 23 | Matte Asher, Israel; M15 – Hard | Cancelled due to Gaza war |
| November 27 | Ramat Gan, Israel; M25 – Hard | Cancelled due to Gaza war |
| December 4 | Ramat Gan, Israel; M15 – Hard | Cancelled due to Gaza war |

== Participating host nations ==
- Argentina (ARG)
- Australia (AUS)
- Austria (AUT)
- Belgium (BEL)
- Bolivia (BOL)
- Bosnia and Herzegovina (BIH)
- Brazil (BRA)
- Bulgaria (BUL)
- Canada (CAN)
- Chile (CHI)
- China (CHN)
- Chinese Taipei (TPE)
- Colombia (COL)
- Congo (COG)
- Croatia (CRO)
- Cyprus (CYP)
- Czech Republic (CZE)
- Denmark (DEN)
- Dominican Republic (DOM)
- Ecuador (ECU)
- Egypt (EGY)
- Estonia (EST)
- Ethiopia (ETH)
- Finland (FIN)
- France (FRA)
- Georgia (GEO)
- Germany (GER)
- Great Britain (GBR)
- Greece (GRE)
- Guam (GUM)
- Hong Kong (HKG)
- Hungary (HUN)
- India (IND)
- Indonesia (INA)
- Iran (IRN)
- Israel (ISR)
- Italy (ITA)
- Japan (JPN)
- Kazakhstan (KAZ)
- Kuwait (KUW)
- Lithuania (LTU)
- Luxembourg (LUX)
- Malaysia (MAS)
- Mexico (MEX)
- Morocco (MAR)
- Netherlands (NED)
- New Zealand (NZL)
- North Macedonia (MKD)
- Peru (PER)
- Poland (POL)
- Portugal (POR)
- Qatar (QAT)
- Romania (ROU)
- Rwanda (RWA)
- Serbia (SRB)
- Singapore (SIN)
- Slovakia (SVK)
- Slovenia (SLO)
- South Korea (KOR)
- Spain (ESP)
- Sweden (SWE)
- Switzerland (SUI)
- Thailand (THA)
- Trinidad and Tobago (TRI)
- Tunisia (TUN)
- Turkey (TUR)
- Uruguay (URU)
- United States (USA)

== Ranking points distribution ==
| Category | W | F | SF | QF | R16 | R32 | Q | Q2 | Q1 |
↓ ATP Ranking Points ↓
| M25+H (S) / M25 (S) | 25 | 16 | 8 | 3 | 1 | – | – | – | – |
| M25+H (D) / M25 (D) | 25 | 16 | 8 | 3 | – | – | – | – | – |
| M15+H (S) / M15 (S) | 15 | 8 | 4 | 2 | 1 | – | – | – | – |
| M15+H (D) / M15 (D) | 15 | 8 | 4 | 2 | – | – | – | – | – |
↓ ITF World Tennis Ranking Points ↓
| M25+H (S) | – | – | – | – | – | – | 4 | 1 | – |
| M25 (S) | – | – | – | – | – | – | 3 | 1 | – |
| M15+H (S) | – | – | – | – | – | – | 3 | 1 | – |
| M15 (S) | – | – | – | – | – | – | 2 | 1 | – |

- "+H" indicates that hospitality is provided.

== Prize money distribution ==
| Category | W | F | SF | QF | R16 | R32 |
| M25+H (S) / M25 (S) | $3,600 | $2,120 | $1,255 | $730 | $430 | $260 |
| M25+H (D) / M25 (D) | $1,550 | $900 | $540 | $320 | $180 | – |
| M15+H (S) / M15 (S) | $2,160 | $1,272 | $753 | $438 | $258 | $156 |
| M15+H (D) / M15 (D) | $930 | $540 | $324 | $192 | $108 | – |

- Doubles prize money per team

== Statistics ==
These tables present the number of singles (S) and doubles (D) titles won by each player and each nation during the season. The players/nations are sorted by:

1. Total number of titles (a doubles title won by two players representing the same nation counts as only one win for the nation)
2. A singles > doubles hierarchy
3. Alphabetical order (by family names for players).

To avoid confusion and double counting, these tables should be updated only after all events of the week are completed.

=== Titles won by player ===
2023 Titles won by player

| Total | Player | M25 | | M15 | | Total | |
| Total | Player | S | D | S | D | S | D |
|---|---|---|---|---|---|---|---|
| 11 | Jakob Schnaitter (GER) | | 3 | 1 | 7 | 1 | 10 |
| 10 | Dragoș Nicolae Mădăraș (SWE) | 3 | | 7 | | 10 | 0 |
| 10 | Gonzalo Oliveira (POR) | 7 | 1 | 2 | | 9 | 1 |
| 10 | Henrique Rocha (POR) | 6 | 4 | | | 6 | 4 |
| 10 | Kai Wehnelt (GER) | | 5 | 1 | 4 | 1 | 9 |
| 9 | Jakub Paul (SUI) | 1 | 4 | 1 | 3 | 2 | 7 |
| 9 | Ryan Seggerman (USA) | 1 | 3 | | 5 | 1 | 8 |
| 8 | Ray Ho (TPE) | | 3 | | 5 | 0 | 8 |
| 8 | Patrik Trhac (USA) | | 3 | | 5 | 0 | 8 |
| 8 | Christoph Negritu (GER) | | | | 8 | 0 | 8 |
| 7 | Garrett Johns (USA) | | 4 | 3 | | 3 | 4 |
| 7 | Sander Jong (NED) | | 2 | 2 | 3 | 2 | 5 |
| 7 | Damien Wenger (SUI) | 1 | 5 | | 1 | 1 | 6 |
| 7 | Jiří Barnat (CZE) | | 3 | 1 | 3 | 1 | 6 |
| 7 | Sidané Pontjodikromo (NED) | | 3 | 1 | 3 | 1 | 6 |
| 7 | Mark Wallner (GER) | | 6 | | 1 | 0 | 7 |
| 7 | Giorgio Ricca (ITA) | | 3 | | 4 | 0 | 7 |
| 7 | Niklas Schell (GER) | | 2 | | 5 | 0 | 7 |
| 6 | Clément Tabur (FRA) | 6 | | | | 6 | 0 |
| 6 | Guy den Ouden (NED) | 2 | 1 | 3 | | 5 | 1 |
| 6 | Marat Sharipov | | | 5 | 1 | 5 | 1 |
| 6 | Alberto Barroso Campos (ESP) | 1 | 2 | 3 | | 4 | 2 |
| 6 | Luke Saville (AUS) | 1 | 3 | 2 | | 3 | 3 |
| 6 | Samuel Vincent Ruggeri (ITA) | 1 | 2 | 2 | 1 | 3 | 3 |
| 6 | August Holmgren (DEN) | 2 | 4 | | | 2 | 4 |
| 6 | Francesco Forti (ITA) | 2 | 3 | | 1 | 2 | 4 |
| 6 | Jay Clarke (GBR) | 2 | 1 | | 3 | 2 | 4 |
| 6 | Neil Oberleitner (AUT) | 1 | 2 | 1 | 2 | 2 | 4 |
| 6 | Sascha Gueymard Wayenburg (FRA) | | 3 | 2 | 1 | 2 | 4 |
| 6 | Dan Alexandru Tomescu (ROU) | | 2 | 2 | 2 | 2 | 4 |
| 6 | Ezekiel Clark (USA) | | 1 | 2 | 3 | 2 | 4 |
| 6 | Ryan Nijboer (NED) | | | 2 | 4 | 2 | 4 |
| 6 | Thomas Fancutt (AUS) | 1 | 5 | | | 1 | 5 |
| 6 | Corentin Denolly (FRA) | 1 | 3 | | 2 | 1 | 5 |
| 6 | Luka Mikrut (CRO) | 1 | 2 | | 3 | 1 | 5 |
| 6 | Viacheslav Bielinskyi (UKR) | | 1 | 1 | 4 | 1 | 5 |
| 6 | Egor Agafonov | | | 1 | 5 | 1 | 5 |
| 6 | Johannes Ingildsen (DEN) | | 4 | | 2 | 0 | 6 |
| 6 | George Goldhoff (USA) | | 3 | | 3 | 0 | 6 |
| 6 | Juan Carlos Aguilar (CAN) | | 2 | | 4 | 0 | 6 |
| 6 | S D Prajwal Dev (IND) | | 1 | | 5 | 0 | 6 |
| 6 | Juan Pablo Paz (ARG) | | 1 | | 5 | 0 | 6 |
| 6 | Andrea Picchione (ITA) | | 1 | | 5 | 0 | 6 |
| 5 | Jules Marie (FRA) | 4 | | 1 | | 5 | 0 |
| 5 | Hady Habib (LIB) | 2 | | 3 | | 5 | 0 |
| 5 | Learner Tien (USA) | 1 | 1 | 2 | 1 | 3 | 2 |
| 5 | Radu Mihai Papoe (ROU) | | 1 | 3 | 1 | 3 | 2 |
| 5 | Sun Fajing (CHN) | 3 | 3 | | | 2 | 3 |
| 5 | Daniel Masur (GER) | 1 | 3 | 1 | | 2 | 3 |
| 5 | Julian Ocleppo (ITA) | 1 | 3 | 1 | | 2 | 3 |
| 5 | Svyatoslav Gulin | 1 | | 1 | 3 | 2 | 3 |
| 5 | Skander Mansouri (TUN) | | 1 | 2 | 2 | 2 | 3 |
| 5 | Jakub Nicod (CZE) | | | 2 | 3 | 2 | 3 |
| 5 | Alex Knaff (LUX) | 1 | 3 | | 1 | 1 | 4 |
| 5 | Valerio Aboian (ARG) | | 2 | 1 | 2 | 1 | 4 |
| 5 | Federico Agustín Gómez (ARG) | | 2 | 1 | 2 | 1 | 4 |
| 5 | Peter Heller (GER) | | 2 | 1 | 2 | 1 | 4 |
| 5 | Kris van Wyk (RSA) | | 2 | 1 | 2 | 1 | 4 |
| 5 | Grigoriy Lomakin (KAZ) | | | 1 | 4 | 1 | 4 |
| 5 | Marcus Willis (GBR) | | 5 | | | 0 | 5 |
| 5 | Simon Freund (SWE) | | 4 | | 1 | 0 | 5 |
| 5 | Francis Alcantara (PHI) | | 3 | | 2 | 0 | 5 |
| 5 | Antoine Hoang (FRA) | | 3 | | 2 | 0 | 5 |
| 5 | Arklon Huertas del Pino (PER) | | 3 | | 2 | 0 | 5 |
| 5 | Mac Kiger (USA) | | 2 | | 3 | 0 | 5 |
| 5 | Ryuki Matsuda (JPN) | | 2 | | 3 | 0 | 5 |
| 5 | Aziz Ouakaa (TUN) | | 2 | | 3 | 0 | 5 |
| 5 | Christopher Rungkat (INA) | | 2 | | 3 | 0 | 5 |
| 5 | Leonardo Aboian (ARG) | | 1 | | 4 | 0 | 5 |
| 5 | Nitin Kumar Sinha (IND) | | 1 | | 4 | 0 | 5 |
| 5 | Finn Reynolds (NZL) | | | | 5 | 0 | 5 |
| 5 | Wang Aoran (CHN) | | | | 5 | 0 | 5 |
| 4 | Martin Krumich (CZE) | 4 | | | | 4 | 0 |
| 4 | Nikolás Sánchez Izquierdo (ESP) | 4 | | | | 4 | 0 |
| 4 | Valentin Royer (FRA) | 2 | | 2 | | 4 | 0 |
| 4 | Cezar Crețu (ROU) | 1 | | 3 | | 4 | 0 |
| 4 | Alexis Gautier (FRA) | 1 | | 3 | | 4 | 0 |
| 4 | Gabi Adrian Boitan (ROU) | | | 4 | | 4 | 0 |
| 4 | Omni Kumar (USA) | | | 4 | | 4 | 0 |
| 4 | Mohamed Safwat (EGY) | | | 4 | | 4 | 0 |
| 4 | Ramkumar Ramanathan (IND) | 3 | 1 | | | 3 | 1 |
| 4 | Vilius Gaubas (LTU) | 2 | 1 | 1 | | 3 | 1 |
| 4 | Arthur Géa (FRA) | 1 | 1 | 2 | | 3 | 1 |
| 4 | Álvaro Guillén Meza (ECU) | 1 | | 2 | 1 | 3 | 1 |
| 4 | Ergi Kırkın (TUR) | 1 | | 2 | 1 | 3 | 1 |
| 4 | Elmer Møller (DEN) | 1 | | 2 | 1 | 3 | 1 |
| 4 | Matej Dodig (CRO) | | 1 | 3 | | 3 | 1 |
| 4 | Bruno Kuzuhara (USA) | | | 3 | 1 | 3 | 1 |
| 4 | Vadym Ursu (UKR) | | | 3 | 1 | 3 | 1 |
| 4 | Max Houkes (NED) | 2 | 2 | | | 2 | '2 |
| 4 | Hsu Yu-hsiou (TPE) | 2 | 2 | | | 2 | '2 |
| 4 | Nathan Ponwith (USA) | 2 | | | 2 | 2 | 2 |
| 4 | Fausto Tabacco (ITA) | 1 | 2 | 1 | | 2 | 2 |
| 4 | Tristan Lamasine (FRA) | 1 | 1 | 1 | 1 | 2 | 2 |
| 4 | Bogdan Bobrov | 1 | | 1 | 2 | 2 | 2 |
| 4 | Saba Purtseladze (GEO) | 1 | | 1 | 2 | 2 | 2 |
| 4 | Thiemo de Bakker (NED) | | 1 | 2 | 1 | 2 | 2 |
| 4 | Giles Hussey (GBR) | | 1 | 2 | 1 | 2 | 2 |
| 4 | Li Zhe (CHN) | | 1 | 2 | 1 | 2 | 2 |
| 4 | Denis Klok | | | 2 | 2 | 2 | 2 |
| 4 | Rémy Bertola (SUI) | 1 | 3 | | | 1 | 3 |
| 4 | Cui Jie (CHN) | 1 | 3 | | | 1 | 3 |
| 4 | Ajeet Rai (NZL) | 1 | 3 | | | 1 | 3 |
| 4 | Tristan Schoolkate (AUS) | 1 | 3 | | | 1 | 3 |
| 4 | Lorenzo Joaquín Rodríguez (ARG) | 1 | 1 | | 2 | 1 | 3 |
| 4 | Alexander Zgirovsky | 1 | 1 | | 2 | 1 | 3 |
| 4 | Ozan Baris (USA) | | 3 | 1 | | 1 | 3 |
| 4 | Yeongseok Jeong (KOR) | | 2 | 1 | 1 | 1 | 3 |
| 4 | Simon Beaupain (BEL) | | 1 | 1 | 2 | 1 | 3 |
| 4 | Andrey Chepelev | | 1 | 1 | 2 | 1 | 3 |
| 4 | Luca Castelnuovo (SUI) | | | 1 | 3 | 1 | 3 |
| 4 | David Pérez Sanz (ESP) | | | 1 | 3 | 1 | 3 |
| 4 | Gonzalo Villanueva (ARG) | | | 1 | 3 | 1 | 3 |
| 4 | Huang Tsung-hao (TPE) | | 4 | | | 0 | 4 |
| 4 | Eric Vanshelboim (UKR) | | 4 | | | 0 | 4 |
| 4 | Emile Hudd (GBR) | | 3 | | 1 | 0 | 4 |
| 4 | Grégoire Jacq (FRA) | | 3 | | 1 | 0 | 4 |
| 4 | Johannus Monday (GBR) | | 3 | | 1 | 0 | 4 |
| 4 | Daniel Pátý (CZE) | | 3 | | 1 | 0 | 4 |
| 4 | Benjamin Winter López (ESP) | | 3 | | 1 | 0 | 4 |
| 4 | Sai Karteek Reddy Ganta (IND) | | 2 | | 2 | 0 | 4 |
| 4 | Johannes Härteis (GER) | | 2 | | 2 | 0 | 4 |
| 4 | Ben Jones (GBR) | | 2 | | 2 | 0 | 4 |
| 4 | Vasil Kirkov (USA) | | 2 | | 2 | 0 | 4 |
| 4 | Jesse Timmermans (NED) | | 2 | | 2 | 0 | 4 |
| 4 | Oscar Weightman (GBR) | | 2 | | 2 | 0 | 4 |
| 4 | Aleksandr Lobanov | | 1 | | 3 | 0 | 4 |
| 4 | Ignacio Monzón (ARG) | | 1 | | 3 | 0 | 4 |
| 4 | Fernando Yamacita (BRA) | | 1 | | 3 | 0 | 4 |
| 4 | Brian Bozemoj (NED) | | | | 4 | 0 | 4 |
| 4 | Quentin Folliot (FRA) | | | | 4 | 0 | 4 |
| 4 | Juan Manuel La Serna (ARG) | | | | 4 | 0 | 4 |
| 4 | Elio José Ribeiro Lago (ITA) | | | | 4 | 0 | 4 |
| 3 | Duje Ajduković (CRO) | 3 | | | | 3 | 0 |
| 3 | Clément Chidekh (FRA) | 3 | | | | 3 | 0 |
| 3 | George Loffhagen (GBR) | 3 | | | | 3 | 0 |
| 3 | Daniel Michalski (POL) | 3 | | | | 3 | 0 |
| 3 | Andrew Paulson (CZE) | 3 | | | | 3 | 0 |
| 3 | Yankı Erel (TUR) | 2 | | 1 | | 3 | 0 |
| 3 | Marvin Möller (GER) | 2 | | 1 | | 3 | 0 |
| 3 | Yan Bai (CHN) | 1 | | 2 | | 3 | 0 |
| 3 | Lucas Gerch (GER) | 1 | | 2 | | 3 | 0 |
| 3 | Martyn Pawelski (POL) | 1 | | 2 | | 3 | 0 |
| 3 | Dmitry Popko (KAZ) | 1 | | 2 | | 3 | 0 |
| 3 | Lorenzo Rottoli (ITA) | 1 | | 2 | | 3 | 0 |
| 3 | Arthur Weber (FRA) | 1 | | 2 | | 3 | 0 |
| 3 | Alex Barrena (ARG) | | | 3 | | 3 | 0 |
| 3 | Lucas Catarina (MON) | | | 3 | | 3 | 0 |
| 3 | Péter Fajta (HUN) | | | 3 | | 3 | 0 |
| 3 | Filip Cristian Jianu (ROU) | | | 3 | | 3 | 0 |
| 3 | Javier Barranco Cosano (ESP) | 2 | 1 | | | 2 | 1 |
| 3 | Martin Damm (USA) | 2 | 1 | | | 2 | 1 |
| 3 | Arthur Fery (GBR) | 2 | 1 | | | 2 | 1 |
| 3 | Kalin Ivanovski (MKD) | 2 | 1 | | | 2 | 1 |
| 3 | Alibek Kachmazov | 2 | 1 | | | 2 | 1 |
| 3 | Daniel Rincón (ESP) | 2 | | | 1 | 2 | 1 |
| 3 | Mátyás Füle (HUN) | 1 | | 1 | 1 | 2 | 1 |
| 3 | Roberto Cid Subervi (DOM) | | 1 | 2 | | 2 | 1 |
| 3 | Luciano Emanuel Ambrogi (ARG) | | | 2 | 1 | 2 | 1 |
| 3 | Florent Bax (FRA) | | | 2 | 1 | 2 | 1 |
| 3 | Liam Draxl (CAN) | | | 2 | 1 | 2 | 1 |
| 3 | Darian King (BAR) | | | 2 | 1 | 2 | 1 |
| 3 | Gilbert Klier Júnior (BRA) | | | 2 | 1 | 2 | 1 |
| 3 | Yanaki Milev (BUL) | | | 2 | 1 | 2 | 1 |
| 3 | Hazem Naw (SYR) | | | 2 | 1 | 2 | 1 |
| 3 | Petr Nesterov (BUL) | | | 2 | 1 | 2 | 1 |
| 3 | Luka Pavlovic (FRA) | | | 2 | 1 | 2 | 1 |
| 3 | Alejo Sánchez Quílez (ESP) | | | 2 | 1 | 2 | 1 |
| 3 | Hikaru Shiraishi (JPN) | | | 2 | 1 | 2 | 1 |
| 3 | Evgenii Tiurnev | | | 2 | 1 | 2 | 1 |
| 3 | Dan Added (FRA) | 1 | 2 | | | 1 | 2 |
| 3 | Charles Broom (GBR) | 1 | 2 | | | 1 | 2 |
| 3 | Daniel Little (GBR) | 1 | 2 | | | 1 | 2 |
| 3 | Imanol López Morillo (ESP) | 1 | 2 | | | 1 | 2 |
| 3 | Hiroki Moriya (JPN) | 1 | 2 | | | 1 | 2 |
| 3 | Patrik Rikl (CZE) | 1 | 2 | | | 1 | 2 |
| 3 | Timo Stodder (GER) | 1 | 2 | | | 1 | 2 |
| 3 | Sandro Kopp (AUT) | 1 | 1 | | 1 | 1 | 2 |
| 3 | Khumoyun Sultanov (UZB) | 1 | 1 | | 1 | 1 | 2 |
| 3 | Justin Barki (INA) | 1 | | | 2 | 1 | 2 |
| 3 | Jeremy Jahn (GER) | | 2 | 1 | | 1 | 2 |
| 3 | Iñaki Montes de la Torre (ESP) | | 2 | 1 | | 1 | 2 |
| 3 | Mili Poljičak (CRO) | | 2 | 1 | | 1 | 2 |
| 3 | Maxence Beaugé (FRA) | | 1 | 1 | 1 | 1 | 2 |
| 3 | Lorenzo Claverie (ITA) | | 1 | 1 | 1 | 1 | 2 |
| 3 | Evgeny Philippov | | 1 | 1 | 1 | 1 | 2 |
| 3 | Eduardo Ribeiro (BRA) | | 1 | 1 | 1 | 1 | 2 |
| 3 | Gabriel Debru (FRA) | | | 1 | 2 | 1 | 2 |
| 3 | Viktor Jović (SRB) | | | 1 | 2 | 1 | 2 |
| 3 | Alejandro Manzanera Pertusa (ESP) | | | 1 | 2 | 1 | 2 |
| 3 | Adrian Oetzbach (GER) | | | 1 | 2 | 1 | 2 |
| 3 | Daniel Cukierman (ISR) | | 3 | | | 0 | 3 |
| 3 | Scott Duncan (GBR) | | 3 | | | 0 | 3 |
| 3 | Jaime Faria (POR) | | 3 | | | 0 | 3 |
| 3 | Patrick Harper (AUS) | | 3 | | | 0 | 3 |
| 3 | Conner Huertas del Pino (PER) | | 3 | | | 0 | 3 |
| 3 | Piotr Matuszewski (POL) | | 3 | | | 0 | 3 |
| 3 | Vladyslav Orlov (UKR) | | 3 | | | 0 | 3 |
| 3 | Stuart Parker (GBR) | | 3 | | | 0 | 3 |
| 3 | David Pichler (AUT) | | 3 | | | 0 | 3 |
| 3 | David Poljak (CZE) | | 3 | | | 0 | 3 |
| 3 | Christian Sigsgaard (DEN) | | 3 | | | 0 | 3 |
| 3 | Takeru Yuzuki (JPN) | | 3 | | | 0 | 3 |
| 3 | Nathan Anthony Barki (INA) | | 2 | | 1 | 0 | 3 |
| 3 | Dax Donders (NED) | | 2 | | 1 | 0 | 3 |
| 3 | Filip Duda (CZE) | | 2 | | 1 | 0 | 3 |
| 3 | Sergey Fomin (UZB) | | 2 | | 1 | 0 | 3 |
| 3 | George Houghton (GBR) | | 2 | | 1 | 0 | 3 |
| 3 | Mariano Kestelboim (ARG) | | 2 | | 1 | 0 | 3 |
| 3 | Jody Maginley (ATG) | | 2 | | 1 | 0 | 3 |
| 3 | Filippo Romano (ITA) | | 2 | | 1 | 0 | 3 |
| 3 | Matěj Vocel (CZE) | | 2 | | 1 | 0 | 3 |
| 3 | Brandon Walkin (AUS) | | 2 | | 1 | 0 | 3 |
| 3 | Seita Watanabe (JPN) | | 2 | | 1 | 0 | 3 |
| 3 | Edward Winter (AUS) | | 2 | | 1 | 0 | 3 |
| 3 | Siddhant Banthia (IND) | | 1 | | 2 | 0 | 3 |
| 3 | Arthur Bouquier (FRA) | | 1 | | 2 | 0 | 3 |
| 3 | James Davis (GBR) | | 1 | | 2 | 0 | 3 |
| 3 | Tomas Farjat (ARG) | | 1 | | 2 | 0 | 3 |
| 3 | Millen Hurrion (GBR) | | 1 | | 2 | 0 | 3 |
| 3 | Dominik Kellovský (CZE) | | 1 | | 2 | 0 | 3 |
| 3 | Aliaksandr Liaonenka | | 1 | | 2 | 0 | 3 |
| 3 | Jorge Martínez Martínez (ESP) | | 1 | | 2 | 0 | 3 |
| 3 | Bryce Nakashima (USA) | | 1 | | 2 | 0 | 3 |
| 3 | Gabriele Maria Noce (ITA) | | 1 | | 2 | 0 | 3 |
| 3 | Oleksandr Ovcharenko (UKR) | | 1 | | 2 | 0 | 3 |
| 3 | Kody Pearson (AUS) | | 1 | | 2 | 0 | 3 |
| 3 | Lukáš Pokorný (SVK) | | 1 | | 2 | 0 | 3 |
| 3 | Gabriel Roveri Sidney (BRA) | | 1 | | 2 | 0 | 3 |
| 3 | Leonid Sheyngezikht (BUL) | | 1 | | 2 | 0 | 3 |
| 3 | Yannik Steinegger (SUI) | | 1 | | 2 | 0 | 3 |
| 3 | Ryotaro Taguchi (JPN) | | 1 | | 2 | 0 | 3 |
| 3 | Vishnu Vardhan (IND) | | 1 | | 2 | 0 | 3 |
| 3 | Alec Beckley (RSA) | | | | 3 | 0 | 3 |
| 3 | Illya Beloborodko (UKR) | | | | 3 | 0 | 3 |
| 3 | Robin Catry (FRA) | | | | 3 | 0 | 3 |
| 3 | Mateo del Pino (ARG) | | | | 3 | 0 | 3 |
| 3 | Alexander Donski (BUL) | | | | 3 | 0 | 3 |
| 3 | Gao Xin (CHN) | | | | 3 | 0 | 3 |
| 3 | Igor Gimenez (BRA) | | | | 3 | 0 | 3 |
| 3 | Kai Lemstra (GER) | | | | 3 | 0 | 3 |
| 3 | Colin Markes (USA) | | | | 3 | 0 | 3 |
| 3 | Alexander Merino (PER) | | | | 3 | 0 | 3 |
| 3 | Andrew Rogers (USA) | | | | 3 | 0 | 3 |
| 3 | Franco Roncadelli (URU) | | | | 3 | 0 | 3 |
| 3 | Joel Schwärzler (AUT) | | | | 3 | 0 | 3 |
| 3 | Volodymyr Uzhylovskyi (UKR) | | | | 3 | 0 | 3 |
| 2 | Alexander Blockx (BEL) | 2 | | | | 2 | 0 |
| 2 | Alex Bolt (AUS) | 2 | | | | 2 | 0 |
| 2 | Leo Borg (SWE) | 2 | | | | 2 | 0 |
| 2 | Ignacio Buse (PER) | 2 | | | | 2 | 0 |
| 2 | Tibo Colson (BEL) | 2 | | | | 2 | 0 |
| 2 | Oliver Crawford (USA) | 2 | | | | 2 | 0 |
| 2 | Evgeny Donskoy | 2 | | | | 2 | 0 |
| 2 | Felix Gill (GBR) | 2 | | | | 2 | 0 |
| 2 | Li Hanwen (CHN) | 2 | | | | 2 | 0 |
| 2 | Aidan McHugh (GBR) | 2 | | | | 2 | 0 |
| 2 | Blake Mott (AUS) | 2 | | | | 2 | 0 |
| 2 | Naoki Nakagawa (JPN) | 2 | | | | 2 | 0 |
| 2 | Lukas Neumayer (AUT) | 2 | | | | 2 | 0 |
| 2 | Lucas Poullain (FRA) | 2 | | | | 2 | 0 |
| 2 | Henri Squire (GER) | 2 | | | | 2 | 0 |
| 2 | Juan Bautista Torres (ARG) | 2 | | | | 2 | 0 |
| 2 | Valentin Vacherot (MON) | 2 | | | | 2 | 0 |
| 2 | Gilles-Arnaud Bailly (BEL) | 1 | | 1 | | 2 | 0 |
| 2 | Elliot Benchetrit (MAR) | 1 | | 1 | | 2 | 0 |
| 2 | Enrico Dalla Valle (ITA) | 1 | | 1 | | 2 | 0 |
| 2 | Karl Friberg (SWE) | 1 | | 1 | | 2 | 0 |
| 2 | Omar Jasika (AUS) | 1 | | 1 | | 2 | 0 |
| 2 | Dayne Kelly (AUS) | 1 | | 1 | | 2 | 0 |
| 2 | Orel Kimhi (ISR) | 1 | | 1 | | 2 | 0 |
| 2 | Carlos López Montagud (ESP) | 1 | | 1 | | 2 | 0 |
| 2 | Pol Martín Tiffon (ESP) | 1 | | 1 | | 2 | 0 |
| 2 | Stefano Napolitano (ITA) | 1 | | 1 | | 2 | 0 |
| 2 | Yshai Oliel (ISR) | 1 | | 1 | | 2 | 0 |
| 2 | San-hui Shin (KOR) | 1 | | 1 | | 2 | 0 |
| 2 | Robert Strombachs (LAT) | 1 | | 1 | | 2 | 0 |
| 2 | Marko Topo (GER) | 1 | | 1 | | 2 | 0 |
| 2 | Adam Walton (AUS) | 1 | | 1 | | 2 | 0 |
| 2 | Coleman Wong (HKG) | 1 | | 1 | | 2 | 0 |
| 2 | Lorenzo Bocchi (ITA) | | | 2 | | 2 | 0 |
| 2 | Gonzalo Bueno (PER) | | | 2 | | 2 | 0 |
| 2 | Matthew Dellavedova (AUS) | | | 2 | | 2 | 0 |
| 2 | Moez Echargui (TUN) | | | 2 | | 2 | 0 |
| 2 | Andre Ilagan (USA) | | | 2 | | 2 | 0 |
| 2 | Nicholas David Ionel (ROU) | | | 2 | | 2 | 0 |
| 2 | Maximus Jones (THA) | | | 2 | | 2 | 0 |
| 2 | Maks Kaśnikowski (POL) | | | 2 | | 2 | 0 |
| 2 | Nicola Kuhn (GER) | | | 2 | | 2 | 0 |
| 2 | Benjamin Hannestad (DEN) | | | 2 | | 2 | 0 |
| 2 | Andrej Nedić (BIH) | | | 2 | | 2 | 0 |
| 2 | Juan Carlos Prado Ángelo (BOL) | | | 2 | | 2 | 0 |
| 2 | Oliver Tarvet (GBR) | | | 2 | | 2 | 0 |
| 2 | Marco Trungelliti (ARG) | | | 2 | | 2 | 0 |
| 2 | Luca Wiedenmann (GER) | | | 2 | | 2 | 0 |
| 2 | Robin Bertrand (FRA) | 1 | 1 | | | 1 | 1 |
| 2 | Jesper de Jong (NED) | 1 | 1 | | | 1 | 1 |
| 2 | Daniel Dutra da Silva (BRA) | 1 | 1 | | | 1 | 1 |
| 2 | John Echeverría (ESP) | 1 | 1 | | | 1 | 1 |
| 2 | Sebastian Fanselow (GER) | 1 | 1 | | | 1 | 1 |
| 2 | Jacob Fearnley (GBR) | 1 | 1 | | | 1 | 1 |
| 2 | Mikalai Haliak | 1 | 1 | | | 1 | 1 |
| 2 | Shintaro Imai (JPN) | 1 | 1 | | | 1 | 1 |
| 2 | Matteo Martineau (FRA) | 1 | 1 | | | 1 | 1 |
| 2 | Giovanni Oradini (ITA) | 1 | 1 | | | 1 | 1 |
| 2 | Park Ui-sung (KOR) | 1 | 1 | | | 1 | 1 |
| 2 | Oriol Roca Batalla (ESP) | 1 | 1 | | | 1 | 1 |
| 2 | Pedro Ródenas (ESP) | 1 | 1 | | | 1 | 1 |
| 2 | Chris Rodesch (LUX) | 1 | 1 | | | 1 | 1 |
| 2 | Shuichi Sekiguchi (JPN) | 1 | 1 | | | 1 | 1 |
| 2 | Michael Vrbenský (CZE) | 1 | 1 | | | 1 | 1 |
| 2 | Harry Wendelken (GBR) | 1 | 1 | | | 1 | 1 |
| 2 | Tim Handel (GER) | 1 | 1 | | | 1 | 1 |
| 2 | Mats Rosenkranz (GER) | 1 | 1 | | | 1 | 1 |
| 2 | Maxence Brovillé (FRA) | | 1 | 1 | | 1 | 1 |
| 2 | Tauheed Browning (USA) | | 1 | 1 | | 1 | 1 |
| 2 | Franco Emanuel Egea (ARG) | | 1 | 1 | | 1 | 1 |
| 2 | Álvaro López San Martín (ESP) | | 1 | 1 | | 1 | 1 |
| 2 | Facundo Mena (ARG) | | 1 | 1 | | 1 | 1 |
| 2 | Lautaro Midón (ARG) | | 1 | 1 | | 1 | 1 |
| 2 | Marcello Serafini (ITA) | | 1 | 1 | | 1 | 1 |
| 2 | Joshua Sheehy (USA) | | 1 | 1 | | 1 | 1 |
| 2 | Colin Sinclair (NMI) | | 1 | 1 | | 1 | 1 |
| 2 | Marlon Vankan (GER) | | 1 | 1 | | 1 | 1 |
| 2 | Bor Artnak (SLO) | | | 1 | 1 | 1 | 1 |
| 2 | Mika Brunold (SUI) | | | 1 | 1 | 1 | 1 |
| 2 | Yassine Dlimi (MAR) | | | 1 | 1 | 1 | 1 |
| 2 | Sora Fukuda (JPN) | | | 1 | 1 | 1 | 1 |
| 2 | Shinji Hazawa (JPN) | | | 1 | 1 | 1 | 1 |
| 2 | Philip Henning (RSA) | | | 1 | 1 | 1 | 1 |
| 2 | Patrick Kaukovalta (FIN) | | | 1 | 1 | 1 | 1 |
| 2 | Àlex Martí Pujolràs (ESP) | | | 1 | 1 | 1 | 1 |
| 2 | Andres Marti (USA) | | | 1 | 1 | 1 | 1 |
| 2 | Stefan Popović (SRB) | | | 1 | 1 | 1 | 1 |
| 2 | Arthur Reymond (FRA) | | | 1 | 1 | 1 | 1 |
| 2 | Erik Arutiunian | | 2 | | | 0 | 2 |
| 2 | Jeremy Beale (AUS) | | 2 | | | 0 | 2 |
| 2 | Dali Blanch (USA) | | 2 | | | 0 | 2 |
| 2 | Chung Yun-seong (KOR) | | 2 | | | 0 | 2 |
| 2 | Murkel Dellien (BOL) | | 2 | | | 0 | 2 |
| 2 | Trey Hilderbrand (USA) | | 2 | | | 0 | 2 |
| 2 | Edan Leshem (ISR) | | 2 | | | 0 | 2 |
| 2 | Daniil Ostapenkov | | 2 | | | 0 | 2 |
| 2 | Alfredo Perez (USA) | | 2 | | | 0 | 2 |
| 2 | Luca Potenza (ITA) | | 2 | | | 0 | 2 |
| 2 | Dominik Reček (CZE) | | 2 | | | 0 | 2 |
| 2 | Matthew Romios (AUS) | | 2 | | | 0 | 2 |
| 2 | Noah Schachter (USA) | | 2 | | | 0 | 2 |
| 2 | Daniel Siniakov (CZE) | | 2 | | | 0 | 2 |
| 2 | Ilya Snițari (MDA) | | 2 | | | 0 | 2 |
| 2 | Giorgio Tabacco (ITA) | | 2 | | | 0 | 2 |
| 2 | Mick Veldheer (NED) | | 2 | | | 0 | 2 |
| 2 | Wang Xiaofei (CHN) | | 2 | | | 0 | 2 |
| 2 | Alexander Weis (ITA) | | 2 | | | 0 | 2 |
| 2 | Mark Whitehouse (GBR) | | 2 | | | 0 | 2 |
| 2 | Andrés Andrade (ECU) | | 1 | | 1 | 0 | 2 |
| 2 | Zvonimir Babić (CRO) | | 1 | | 1 | 0 | 2 |
| 2 | Peter Bertran (DOM) | | 1 | | 1 | 0 | 2 |
| 2 | Ivan Denisov | | 1 | | 1 | 0 | 2 |
| 2 | Gabriel Donev (BUL) | | 1 | | 1 | 0 | 2 |
| 2 | Anthony Genov (BUL) | | 1 | | 1 | 0 | 2 |
| 2 | Juan Sebastián Gómez (COL) | | 1 | | 1 | 0 | 2 |
| 2 | Taisei Ichikawa (JPN) | | 1 | | 1 | 0 | 2 |
| 2 | Pruchya Isaro (THA) | | 1 | | 1 | 0 | 2 |
| 2 | Simon Anthony Ivanov (BUL) | | 1 | | 1 | 0 | 2 |
| 2 | Sho Katayama (JPN) | | 1 | | 1 | 0 | 2 |
| 2 | Joshua Lapadat (CAN) | | 1 | | 1 | 0 | 2 |
| 2 | Louroi Martinez (SUI) | | 1 | | 1 | 0 | 2 |
| 2 | Shunsuke Nakagawa (JPN) | | 1 | | 1 | 0 | 2 |
| 2 | Alexey Nesterov | | 1 | | 1 | 0 | 2 |
| 2 | Juan Bautista Otegui (ARG) | | 1 | | 1 | 0 | 2 |
| 2 | Gabriele Piraino (ITA) | | 1 | | 1 | 0 | 2 |
| 2 | Oleg Prihodko (UKR) | | 1 | | 1 | 0 | 2 |
| 2 | Benjamin Sigouin (CAN) | | 1 | | 1 | 0 | 2 |
| 2 | Parikshit Somani (IND) | | 1 | | 1 | 0 | 2 |
| 2 | Roy Stepanov (ISR) | | 1 | | 1 | 0 | 2 |
| 2 | David Stevenson (GBR) | | 1 | | 1 | 0 | 2 |
| 2 | Fermín Tenti (ARG) | | 1 | | 1 | 0 | 2 |
| 2 | Wishaya Trongcharoenchaikul (THA) | | 1 | | 1 | 0 | 2 |
| 2 | Joe Tyler (GBR) | | 1 | | 1 | 0 | 2 |
| 2 | Eero Vasa (FIN) | | 1 | | 1 | 0 | 2 |
| 2 | Augusto Virgili (ITA) | | 1 | | 1 | 0 | 2 |
| 2 | Niels Visker (NED) | | 1 | | 1 | 0 | 2 |
| 2 | Tyler Zink (USA) | | 1 | | 1 | 0 | 2 |
| 2 | Aleksandre Bakshi (GEO) | | | | 2 | 0 | 2 |
| 2 | Blake Bayldon (AUS) | | | | 2 | 0 | 2 |
| 2 | Constantin Bittoun Kouzmine (FRA) | | | | 2 | 0 | 2 |
| 2 | Jurriaan Bol (NED) | | | | 2 | 0 | 2 |
| 2 | Gabriele Bosio (ITA) | | | | 2 | 0 | 2 |
| 2 | Florian Broska (GER) | | | | 2 | 0 | 2 |
| 2 | Ignacio Carou (URU) | | | | 2 | 0 | 2 |
| 2 | Niccolo Catini (ITA) | | | | 2 | 0 | 2 |
| 2 | Keshav Chopra (USA) | | | | 2 | 0 | 2 |
| 2 | Stylianos Christodoulou (CYP) | | | | 2 | 0 | 2 |
| 2 | Marcus Daniell (NZL) | | | | 2 | 0 | 2 |
| 2 | Daniel de Jonge (NED) | | | | 2 | 0 | 2 |
| 2 | Michiel de Krom (NED) | | | | 2 | 0 | 2 |
| 2 | Matteo De Vincentis (ITA) | | | | 2 | 0 | 2 |
| 2 | Guy den Heijer (NED) | | | | 2 | 0 | 2 |
| 2 | Buvaysar Gadamauri (BEL) | | | | 2 | 0 | 2 |
| 2 | Luca Giacomini (ITA) | | | | 2 | 0 | 2 |
| 2 | William Grant (USA) | | | | 2 | 0 | 2 |
| 2 | Jan Hrazdil (CZE) | | | | 2 | 0 | 2 |
| 2 | Tomáš Lánik (SVK) | | | | 2 | 0 | 2 |
| 2 | Noah Lopez (SUI) | | | | 2 | 0 | 2 |
| 2 | João Victor Couto Loureiro (BRA) | | | | 2 | 0 | 2 |
| 2 | James MacKinlay (GBR) | | | | 2 | 0 | 2 |
| 2 | Tao Mu (CHN) | | | | 2 | 0 | 2 |
| 2 | Axel Nefve (USA) | | | | 2 | 0 | 2 |
| 2 | Eleftherios Neos (CYP) | | | | 2 | 0 | 2 |
| 2 | Ștefan Paloși (ROU) | | | | 2 | 0 | 2 |
| 2 | Tiago Pereira (POR) | | | | 2 | 0 | 2 |
| 2 | Samuel Puškár (SVK) | | | | 2 | 0 | 2 |
| 2 | Lawrence Sciglitano (AUS) | | | | 2 | 0 | 2 |
| 2 | Luigi Sorrentino (ITA) | | | | 2 | 0 | 2 |
| 2 | Thantub Suksumrarn (THA) | | | | 2 | 0 | 2 |
| 2 | Sun Qian (CHN) | | | | 2 | 0 | 2 |
| 2 | Fons van Sambeek (NED) | | | | 2 | 0 | 2 |
| 2 | Paul Wörner (GER) | | | | 2 | 0 | 2 |
| 2 | Patrick Zahraj (GER) | | | | 2 | 0 | 2 |
| 1 | Mateus Alves (BRA) | 1 | | | | 1 | 0 |
| 1 | Térence Atmane (FRA) | 1 | | | | 1 | 0 |
| 1 | Pierre-Yves Bailly (BEL) | 1 | | | | 1 | 0 |
| 1 | Blaise Bicknell (JAM) | 1 | | | | 1 | 0 |
| 1 | Ugo Blanchet (FRA) | 1 | | | | 1 | 0 |
| 1 | Justin Boulais (CAN) | 1 | | | | 1 | 0 |
| 1 | Mathias Bourgue (FRA) | 1 | | | | 1 | 0 |
| 1 | Gerard Campaña Lee (KOR) | 1 | | | | 1 | 0 |
| 1 | Salvatore Caruso (ITA) | 1 | | | | 1 | 0 |
| 1 | Francisco Comesaña (ARG) | 1 | | | | 1 | 0 |
| 1 | Marius Copil (ROU) | 1 | | | | 1 | 0 |
| 1 | Miguel Damas (ESP) | 1 | | | | 1 | 0 |
| 1 | Gabriel Diallo (CAN) | 1 | | | | 1 | 0 |
| 1 | Titouan Droguet (FRA) | 1 | | | | 1 | 0 |
| 1 | Yurii Dzhavakian (UKR) | 1 | | | | 1 | 0 |
| 1 | Ernesto Escobedo (MEX) | 1 | | | | 1 | 0 |
| 1 | Michael Geerts (BEL) | 1 | | | | 1 | 0 |
| 1 | Prajnesh Gunneswaran (IND) | 1 | | | | 1 | 0 |
| 1 | Cash Hanzlik (USA) | 1 | | | | 1 | 0 |
| 1 | Gustavo Heide (BRA) | 1 | | | | 1 | 0 |
| 1 | Calvin Hemery (FRA) | 1 | | | | 1 | 0 |
| 1 | Maxime Janvier (FRA) | 1 | | | | 1 | 0 |
| 1 | David Jordà Sanchis (ESP) | 1 | | | | 1 | 0 |
| 1 | Jason Jung (TPE) | 1 | | | | 1 | 0 |
| 1 | Mitchell Krueger (USA) | 1 | | | | 1 | 0 |
| 1 | Jérôme Kym (SUI) | 1 | | | | 1 | 0 |
| 1 | Pablo Llamas Ruiz (ESP) | 1 | | | | 1 | 0 |
| 1 | Juan Ignacio Londero (ARG) | 1 | | | | 1 | 0 |
| 1 | Karim-Mohamed Maamoun (EGY) | 1 | | | | 1 | 0 |
| 1 | Jakub Menšík (CZE) | 1 | | | | 1 | 0 |
| 1 | Rudolf Molleker (GER) | 1 | | | | 1 | 0 |
| 1 | Makoto Ochi (JPN) | 1 | | | | 1 | 0 |
| 1 | Tom Paris (FRA) | 1 | | | | 1 | 0 |
| 1 | Sergi Pérez Contri (ESP) | 1 | | | | 1 | 0 |
| 1 | Jack Pinnington Jones (GBR) | 1 | | | | 1 | 0 |
| 1 | Marc Polmans (AUS) | 1 | | | | 1 | 0 |
| 1 | Ethan Quinn (USA) | 1 | | | | 1 | 0 |
| 1 | Pedro Sakamoto (BRA) | 1 | | | | 1 | 0 |
| 1 | Toby Samuel (GBR) | 1 | | | | 1 | 0 |
| 1 | Yuta Shimizu (JPN) | 1 | | | | 1 | 0 |
| 1 | Dane Sweeny (AUS) | 1 | | | | 1 | 0 |
| 1 | Te Rigele (CHN) | 1 | | | | 1 | 0 |
| 1 | Renta Tokuda (JPN) | 1 | | | | 1 | 0 |
| 1 | Quinn Vandecasteele (USA) | 1 | | | | 1 | 0 |
| 1 | Nikolay Vylegzhanin | 1 | | | | 1 | 0 |
| 1 | Louis Wessels (GER) | 1 | | | | 1 | 0 |
| 1 | Kacper Żuk (POL) | 1 | | | | 1 | 0 |
| 1 | Seydina André (SEN) | | | 1 | | 1 | 0 |
| 1 | Alexandre Aubriot (FRA) | | | 1 | | 1 | 0 |
| 1 | Jacob Brumm (USA) | | | 1 | | 1 | 0 |
| 1 | Edas Butvilas (LTU) | | | 1 | | 1 | 0 |
| 1 | Luca Castagnola (ITA) | | | 1 | | 1 | 0 |
| 1 | Eliakim Coulibaly (CIV) | | | 1 | | 1 | 0 |
| 1 | Alexandr Cozbinov (MDA) | | | 1 | | 1 | 0 |
| 1 | Sean Cuenin (FRA) | | | 1 | | 1 | 0 |
| 1 | Vlad Andrei Dancu (ROU) | | | 1 | | 1 | 0 |
| 1 | Alec Deckers (NED) | | | 1 | | 1 | 0 |
| 1 | Branko Đurić (SRB) | | | 1 | | 1 | 0 |
| 1 | Stefan Dostanic (USA) | | | 1 | | 1 | 0 |
| 1 | Aziz Dougaz (TUN) | | | 1 | | 1 | 0 |
| 1 | Elmar Ejupovic (GER) | | | 1 | | 1 | 0 |
| 1 | Kilian Feldbausch (SUI) | | | 1 | | 1 | 0 |
| 1 | Muhammad Rifqi Fitriadi (INA) | | | 1 | | 1 | 0 |
| 1 | Jonáš Forejtek (CZE) | | | 1 | | 1 | 0 |
| 1 | Daniil Glinka (EST) | | | 1 | | 1 | 0 |
| 1 | Mario González Fernández (ESP) | | | 1 | | 1 | 0 |
| 1 | Alastair Gray (GBR) | | | 1 | | 1 | 0 |
| 1 | Federico Iannaccone (ITA) | | | 1 | | 1 | 0 |
| 1 | Jeremy Jin (AUS) | | | 1 | | 1 | 0 |
| 1 | Paul Jubb (GBR) | | | 1 | | 1 | 0 |
| 1 | Guido Iván Justo (ARG) | | | 1 | | 1 | 0 |
| 1 | Paweł Juszczak (POL) | | | 1 | | 1 | 0 |
| 1 | Yuta Kawahashi (JPN) | | | 1 | | 1 | 0 |
| 1 | Thai-Son Kwiatkowski (USA) | | | 1 | | 1 | 0 |
| 1 | Giuseppe La Vela (ITA) | | | 1 | | 1 | 0 |
| 1 | Lewie Lane (GER) | | | 1 | | 1 | 0 |
| 1 | Edoardo Lavagno (ITA) | | | 1 | | 1 | 0 |
| 1 | Lee Jea-moon (KOR) | | | 1 | | 1 | 0 |
| 1 | Mitsuki Wei Kang Leong (MAS) | | | 1 | | 1 | 0 |
| 1 | Orlando Luz (BRA) | | | 1 | | 1 | 0 |
| 1 | Lilian Marmousez (FRA) | | | 1 | | 1 | 0 |
| 1 | Dan Martin (CAN) | | | 1 | | 1 | 0 |
| 1 | Alex Michelsen (USA) | | | 1 | | 1 | 0 |
| 1 | Filippo Moroni (ITA) | | | 1 | | 1 | 0 |
| 1 | Fnu Nidunjianzan (CHN) | | | 1 | | 1 | 0 |
| 1 | Dušan Obradović (SRB) | | | 1 | | 1 | 0 |
| 1 | Genaro Alberto Olivieri (ARG) | | | 1 | | 1 | 0 |
| 1 | Gauthier Onclin (BEL) | | | 1 | | 1 | 0 |
| 1 | Rodrigo Pacheco Méndez (MEX) | | | 1 | | 1 | 0 |
| 1 | Bogdan Pavel (ROU) | | | 1 | | 1 | 0 |
| 1 | Gabriele Pennaforti (ITA) | | | 1 | | 1 | 0 |
| 1 | Olaf Pieczkowski (POL) | | | 1 | | 1 | 0 |
| 1 | Sebastian Prechtel (GER) | | | 1 | | 1 | 0 |
| 1 | Dino Prižmić (CRO) | | | 1 | | 1 | 0 |
| 1 | Iliyan Radulov (BUL) | | | 1 | | 1 | 0 |
| 1 | Amaury Raynel (FRA) | | | 1 | | 1 | 0 |
| 1 | Maxence Rivet (FRA) | | | 1 | | 1 | 0 |
| 1 | Blaž Rola (SLO) | | | 1 | | 1 | 0 |
| 1 | Fabien Salle (FRA) | | | 1 | | 1 | 0 |
| 1 | Karue Sell (BRA) | | | 1 | | 1 | 0 |
| 1 | Digvijay Pratap Singh (IND) | | | 1 | | 1 | 0 |
| 1 | Kristjan Tamm (EST) | | | 1 | | 1 | 0 |
| 1 | Bernard Tomic (AUS) | | | 1 | | 1 | 0 |
| 1 | JJ Tracy (USA) | | | 1 | | 1 | 0 |
| 1 | Li Tu (AUS) | | | 1 | | 1 | 0 |
| 1 | Duarte Vale (POR) | | | 1 | | 1 | 0 |
| 1 | Iiro Vasa (FIN) | | | 1 | | 1 | 0 |
| 1 | Alexey Zakharov | | | 1 | | 1 | 0 |
| 1 | Aaron Addison (AUS) | | 1 | | | 0 | 1 |
| 1 | Petr Bar Biryukov | | 1 | | | 0 | 1 |
| 1 | Niccolò Baroni (ITA) | | 1 | | | 0 | 1 |
| 1 | Nikola Bašić (CRO) | | 1 | | | 0 | 1 |
| 1 | Finn Bass (GBR) | | 1 | | | 0 | 1 |
| 1 | Filip Bergevi (SWE) | | 1 | | | 0 | 1 |
| 1 | Patrick Brady (GBR) | | 1 | | | 0 | 1 |
| 1 | Luís Britto (BRA) | | 1 | | | 0 | 1 |
| 1 | Tim Büttner (GER) | | 1 | | | 0 | 1 |
| 1 | Nicholas Bybel (USA) | | 1 | | | 0 | 1 |
| 1 | Vasilios Caripi (RSA) | | 1 | | | 0 | 1 |
| 1 | Hernán Casanova (ARG) | | 1 | | | 0 | 1 |
| 1 | Robert Cash (USA) | | 1 | | | 0 | 1 |
| 1 | Matyáš Černý (CZE) | | 1 | | | 0 | 1 |
| 1 | Íñigo Cervantes (ESP) | | 1 | | | 0 | 1 |
| 1 | Choe Jae-sung (KOR) | | 1 | | | 0 | 1 |
| 1 | Chung Hong (KOR) | | 1 | | | 0 | 1 |
| 1 | Federico Cinà (ITA) | | 1 | | | 0 | 1 |
| 1 | Ethan Cook (AUS) | | 1 | | | 0 | 1 |
| 1 | Kenny de Schepper (FRA) | | 1 | | | 0 | 1 |
| 1 | Blake Ellis (AUS) | | 1 | | | 0 | 1 |
| 1 | Amr Elsayed (EGY) | | 1 | | | 0 | 1 |
| 1 | Mathys Erhard (FRA) | | 1 | | | 0 | 1 |
| 1 | Gianmarco Ferrari (ITA) | | 1 | | | 0 | 1 |
| 1 | Egor Gerasimov | | 1 | | | 0 | 1 |
| 1 | Yanis Ghazouani Durand (FRA) | | 1 | | | 0 | 1 |
| 1 | Tom Hands (GBR) | | 1 | | | 0 | 1 |
| 1 | Mats Hermans (NED) | | 1 | | | 0 | 1 |
| 1 | Gabriel Alejandro Hidalgo (ARG) | | 1 | | | 0 | 1 |
| 1 | Guy Orly Iradukunda (BDI) | | 1 | | | 0 | 1 |
| 1 | Markos Kalovelonis (GRE) | | 1 | | | 0 | 1 |
| 1 | Jan Kupčič (SLO) | | 1 | | | 0 | 1 |
| 1 | Christian Langmo (USA) | | 1 | | | 0 | 1 |
| 1 | Liu Shaoyun (CHN) | | 1 | | | 0 | 1 |
| 1 | Thijmen Loof (NED) | | 1 | | | 0 | 1 |
| 1 | Álex Martínez (ESP) | | 1 | | | 0 | 1 |
| 1 | Loann Massard (FRA) | | 1 | | | 0 | 1 |
| 1 | J. Mercer (USA) | | 1 | | | 0 | 1 |
| 1 | Shunsuke Mitsui (JPN) | | 1 | | | 0 | 1 |
| 1 | Mukund Sasikumar (IND) | | 1 | | | 0 | 1 |
| 1 | Nikolay Nedelchev (BUL) | | 1 | | | 0 | 1 |
| 1 | Kosuke Ogura (JPN) | | 1 | | | 0 | 1 |
| 1 | Nicolás Parizzia (SUI) | | 1 | | | 0 | 1 |
| 1 | Brandon Pérez (VEN) | | 1 | | | 0 | 1 |
| 1 | Antonio Prat (ESP) | | 1 | | | 0 | 1 |
| 1 | Calum Puttergill (AUS) | | 1 | | | 0 | 1 |
| 1 | Purav Raja (IND) | | 1 | | | 0 | 1 |
| 1 | Francisco Rocha (POR) | | 1 | | | 0 | 1 |
| 1 | Luca Sanchez (FRA) | | 1 | | | 0 | 1 |
| 1 | João Eduardo Schiessl (BRA) | | 1 | | | 0 | 1 |
| 1 | Ilia Simakin | | 1 | | | 0 | 1 |
| 1 | Fred Simonsson (SWE) | | 1 | | | 0 | 1 |
| 1 | Josip Šimundža (CRO) | | 1 | | | 0 | 1 |
| 1 | Son Ji-hoon (KOR) | | 1 | | | 0 | 1 |
| 1 | Daisuke Sumizawa (JPN) | | 1 | | | 0 | 1 |
| 1 | Zaharije-Zak Talic (AUS) | | 1 | | | 0 | 1 |
| 1 | Adam Taylor (AUS) | | 1 | | | 0 | 1 |
| 1 | Jason Taylor (AUS) | | 1 | | | 0 | 1 |
| 1 | Connor Thomson (GBR) | | 1 | | | 0 | 1 |
| 1 | Stefano Travaglia (ITA) | | 1 | | | 0 | 1 |
| 1 | Andrés Urrea (COL) | | 1 | | | 0 | 1 |
| 1 | Jack Vance (USA) | | 1 | | | 0 | 1 |
| 1 | Pedro Vives Marcos (ESP) | | 1 | | | 0 | 1 |
| 1 | Émilien Voisin (FRA) | | 1 | | | 0 | 1 |
| 1 | Olle Wallin (SWE) | | 1 | | | 0 | 1 |
| 1 | Deney Wassermann (NED) | | 1 | | | 0 | 1 |
| 1 | Miko Wassermann (NED) | | 1 | | | 0 | 1 |
| 1 | Max Westphal (FRA) | | 1 | | | 0 | 1 |
| 1 | Tennyson Whiting (USA) | | 1 | | | 0 | 1 |
| 1 | Henrik Wiersholm (USA) | | 1 | | | 0 | 1 |
| 1 | Cooper Williams (USA) | | 1 | | | 0 | 1 |
| 1 | Theodore Winegar (USA) | | 1 | | | 0 | 1 |
| 1 | Xiao Linang (CHN) | | 1 | | | 0 | 1 |
| 1 | Zheng Zhan (CHN) | | 1 | | | 0 | 1 |
| 1 | Evan Zhu (USA) | | 1 | | | 0 | 1 |
| 1 | Wissam Abderrahman (TUN) | | | | 1 | 0 | 1 |
| 1 | Cengiz Aksu (TUR) | | | | 1 | 0 | 1 |
| 1 | Taym Al Azmeh (GER) | | | | 1 | 0 | 1 |
| 1 | Max Alcalá Gurri (ESP) | | | | 1 | 0 | 1 |
| 1 | Jack Anthrop (USA) | | | | 1 | 0 | 1 |
| 1 | Miguel Avendaño Cadena (ESP) | | | | 1 | 0 | 1 |
| 1 | Andrea Bacaloni (ITA) | | | | 1 | 0 | 1 |
| 1 | Blu Baker (GBR) | | | | 1 | 0 | 1 |
| 1 | Sekou Bangoura (USA) | | | | 1 | 0 | 1 |
| 1 | Isaac Becroft (NZL) | | | | 1 | 0 | 1 |
| 1 | Mehdi Benchakroun (MAR) | | | | 1 | 0 | 1 |
| 1 | Jacopo Bilardo (ITA) | | | | 1 | 0 | 1 |
| 1 | Rithvik Choudary Bollipalli (IND) | | | | 1 | 0 | 1 |
| 1 | Federico Bondioli (ITA) | | | | 1 | 0 | 1 |
| 1 | Lucas Bouquet (FRA) | | | | 1 | 0 | 1 |
| 1 | Aleksandr Braynin (UKR) | | | | 1 | 0 | 1 |
| 1 | Nicolás Bruna (CHI) | | | | 1 | 0 | 1 |
| 1 | Lorenzo Carboni (ITA) | | | | 1 | 0 | 1 |
| 1 | Nick Chappell (USA) | | | | 1 | 0 | 1 |
| 1 | Yuttana Charoenphon (THA) | | | | 1 | 0 | 1 |
| 1 | Anton Chekhov | | | | 1 | 0 | 1 |
| 1 | Ioan Alexandru Chirița (ROU) | | | | 1 | 0 | 1 |
| 1 | Fábio Coelho (POR) | | | | 1 | 0 | 1 |
| 1 | Tommaso Compagnucci (ITA) | | | | 1 | 0 | 1 |
| 1 | Alessandro Cortegiani (ITA) | | | | 1 | 0 | 1 |
| 1 | Felix Corwin (USA) | | | | 1 | 0 | 1 |
| 1 | Max Dahlin (SWE) | | | | 1 | 0 | 1 |
| 1 | Maikel De Boes (BEL) | | | | 1 | 0 | 1 |
| 1 | Thomas Deschamps (FRA) | | | | 1 | 0 | 1 |
| 1 | Ángel Díaz Jalil (ECU) | | | | 1 | 0 | 1 |
| 1 | Matic Dimic (SLO) | | | | 1 | 0 | 1 |
| 1 | Sebastian Dominko (SLO) | | | | 1 | 0 | 1 |
| 1 | Matthew William Donald (CZE) | | | | 1 | 0 | 1 |
| 1 | Dong Bohua (CHN) | | | | 1 | 0 | 1 |
| 1 | Andrei Duarte (COL) | | | | 1 | 0 | 1 |
| 1 | Vlad Andrei Dumitru (ROU) | | | | 1 | 0 | 1 |
| 1 | Menelaos Efstathiou (CYP) | | | | 1 | 0 | 1 |
| 1 | Nino Ehrenschneider (GER) | | | | 1 | 0 | 1 |
| 1 | Akram El Sallaly (EGY) | | | | 1 | 0 | 1 |
| 1 | Ishaque Eqbal (IND) | | | | 1 | 0 | 1 |
| 1 | Lorenzo Esquici (BRA) | | | | 1 | 0 | 1 |
| 1 | Ryan Fishback (USA) | | | | 1 | 0 | 1 |
| 1 | Filiberto Fumagalli (ITA) | | | | 1 | 0 | 1 |
| 1 | Teymuraz Gabashvili | | | | 1 | 0 | 1 |
| 1 | Lorenzo Gagliardo (ARG) | | | | 1 | 0 | 1 |
| 1 | Piotr Galus (POL) | | | | 1 | 0 | 1 |
| 1 | Axel Garcian (FRA) | | | | 1 | 0 | 1 |
| 1 | Joshua Goodger (GBR) | | | | 1 | 0 | 1 |
| 1 | Erik Grevelius (SWE) | | | | 1 | 0 | 1 |
| 1 | Samir Hamza Reguig (ALG) | | | | 1 | 0 | 1 |
| 1 | Han Seong-yong (KOR) | | | | 1 | 0 | 1 |
| 1 | Adam Heinonen (SWE) | | | | 1 | 0 | 1 |
| 1 | Carles Hernández (ESP) | | | | 1 | 0 | 1 |
| 1 | Matthew Howse (GBR) | | | | 1 | 0 | 1 |
| 1 | Dario Huber (SUI) | | | | 1 | 0 | 1 |
| 1 | Nikita Ianin | | | | 1 | 0 | 1 |
| 1 | Paul Inchauspe (FRA) | | | | 1 | 0 | 1 |
| 1 | Kokoro Isomura (JPN) | | | | 1 | 0 | 1 |
| 1 | Vladislav Ivanov | | | | 1 | 0 | 1 |
| 1 | Jarno Jans (NED) | | | | 1 | 0 | 1 |
| 1 | Jiří Jeníček (CZE) | | | | 1 | 0 | 1 |
| 1 | Kristijan Juhas (SRB) | | | | 1 | 0 | 1 |
| 1 | Jacob Kahoun (GER) | | | | 1 | 0 | 1 |
| 1 | Niki Kaliyanda Poonacha (IND) | | | | 1 | 0 | 1 |
| 1 | Miloš Karol (SVK) | | | | 1 | 0 | 1 |
| 1 | Szymon Kielan (POL) | | | | 1 | 0 | 1 |
| 1 | Kirill Kivattsev | | | | 1 | 0 | 1 |
| 1 | Georgii Kravchenko (UKR) | | | | 1 | 0 | 1 |
| 1 | Sergis Kyratzis (CYP) | | | | 1 | 0 | 1 |
| 1 | Luis Llorens Saracho (ESP) | | | | 1 | 0 | 1 |
| 1 | Lorenzo Lorusso (ITA) | | | | 1 | 0 | 1 |
| 1 | Gergely Madarász (HUN) | | | | 1 | 0 | 1 |
| 1 | Patrick Maloney (USA) | | | | 1 | 0 | 1 |
| 1 | Călin Manda (ROU) | | | | 1 | 0 | 1 |
| 1 | Nathan Mao (USA) | | | | 1 | 0 | 1 |
| 1 | Mihai Răzvan Marinescu (ROU) | | | | 1 | 0 | 1 |
| 1 | Samuel Martínez Arjona (ESP) | | | | 1 | 0 | 1 |
| 1 | Marcus McDaniel (USA) | | | | 1 | 0 | 1 |
| 1 | Aleksandre Metreveli (GEO) | | | | 1 | 0 | 1 |
| 1 | Gabriele Moghini (SUI) | | | | 1 | 0 | 1 |
| 1 | Adam Moundir (MAR) | | | | 1 | 0 | 1 |
| 1 | François Musitelli (FRA) | | | | 1 | 0 | 1 |
| 1 | Adam Nagoudi (TUN) | | | | 1 | 0 | 1 |
| 1 | Eduardo Nava (USA) | | | | 1 | 0 | 1 |
| 1 | Ivan Nedelko | | | | 1 | 0 | 1 |
| 1 | Osgar O'Hoisin (IRL) | | | | 1 | 0 | 1 |
| 1 | Christian Oliveira (BRA) | | | | 1 | 0 | 1 |
| 1 | Stijn Paardekooper (NED) | | | | 1 | 0 | 1 |
| 1 | Jorge Panta (PER) | | | | 1 | 0 | 1 |
| 1 | Thomas Pavlekovich Smith (AUS) | | | | 1 | 0 | 1 |
| 1 | Stijn Pel (NED) | | | | 1 | 0 | 1 |
| 1 | Samuele Pieri (ITA) | | | | 1 | 0 | 1 |
| 1 | Joel Pierleoni (GBR) | | | | 1 | 0 | 1 |
| 1 | Jorge Plans (ESP) | | | | 1 | 0 | 1 |
| 1 | Peter Benjamín Privara (SVK) | | | | 1 | 0 | 1 |
| 1 | Faisal Qamar (IND) | | | | 1 | 0 | 1 |
| 1 | Maciej Rajski (POL) | | | | 1 | 0 | 1 |
| 1 | Stefano Reitano (ITA) | | | | 1 | 0 | 1 |
| 1 | Giacomo Revelli (GBR) | | | | 1 | 0 | 1 |
| 1 | Franco Ribero (ARG) | | | | 1 | 0 | 1 |
| 1 | Johan Alexander Rodríguez (COL) | | | | 1 | 0 | 1 |
| 1 | Leonardo Rossi (ITA) | | | | 1 | 0 | 1 |
| 1 | Alan Fernando Rubio Fierros (MEX) | | | | 1 | 0 | 1 |
| 1 | Tim Rühl (GER) | | | | 1 | 0 | 1 |
| 1 | Václav Šafránek (CZE) | | | | 1 | 0 | 1 |
| 1 | Keisuke Saitoh (JPN) | | | | 1 | 0 | 1 |
| 1 | Dimitris Sakellaridis (GRE) | | | | 1 | 0 | 1 |
| 1 | Stefanos Sakellaridis (GRE) | | | | 1 | 0 | 1 |
| 1 | Dylan Salton (RSA) | | | | 1 | 0 | 1 |
| 1 | Kasidit Samrej (THA) | | | | 1 | 0 | 1 |
| 1 | Paulo André Saraiva dos Santos (BRA) | | | | 1 | 0 | 1 |
| 1 | Gökberk Sarıtaş (TUR) | | | | 1 | 0 | 1 |
| 1 | Nathan Seateun (FRA) | | | | 1 | 0 | 1 |
| 1 | Maxim Shin (UZB) | | | | 1 | 0 | 1 |
| 1 | Shin Woo-bin (KOR) | | | | 1 | 0 | 1 |
| 1 | Igor Sijsling (NED) | | | | 1 | 0 | 1 |
| 1 | Adit Sinha (USA) | | | | 1 | 0 | 1 |
| 1 | Alexandros Skorilas (GRE) | | | | 1 | 0 | 1 |
| 1 | Keegan Smith (USA) | | | | 1 | 0 | 1 |
| 1 | Matías Soto (CHI) | | | | 1 | 0 | 1 |
| 1 | John Sperle (GER) | | | | 1 | 0 | 1 |
| 1 | Luca Stäheli (SUI) | | | | 1 | 0 | 1 |
| 1 | Hamish Stewart (GBR) | | | | 1 | 0 | 1 |
| 1 | Yamato Sueoka (JPN) | | | | 1 | 0 | 1 |
| 1 | Matthew Summers (GBR) | | | | 1 | 0 | 1 |
| 1 | Jasza Szajrych (POL) | | | | 1 | 0 | 1 |
| 1 | Naoki Tajima (JPN) | | | | 1 | 0 | 1 |
| 1 | Mariano Tammaro (ITA) | | | | 1 | 0 | 1 |
| 1 | Sheng Tang (CHN) | | | | 1 | 0 | 1 |
| 1 | Nicolas Tourte (FRA) | | | | 1 | 0 | 1 |
| 1 | Matthias Ujvary (AUT) | | | | 1 | 0 | 1 |
| 1 | Daniel Vallejo (PAR) | | | | 1 | 0 | 1 |
| 1 | Cyril Vandermeersch (FRA) | | | | 1 | 0 | 1 |
| 1 | Lorenzo Vatteroni (ITA) | | | | 1 | 0 | 1 |
| 1 | Bautista Vilicich (ARG) | | | | 1 | 0 | 1 |
| 1 | Semen Voronin | | | | 1 | 0 | 1 |
| 1 | James Watt (NZL) | | | | 1 | 0 | 1 |
| 1 | Yann Wójcik (POL) | | | | 1 | 0 | 1 |
| 1 | Nicolas Zanellato (BRA) | | | | 1 | 0 | 1 |
| 1 | Zhao Zhao (CHN) | | | | 1 | 0 | 1 |
| 1 | Zheng Baoluo (CHN) | | | | 1 | 0 | 1 |
| 1 | Matías Zukas (ARG) | | | | 1 | 0 | 1 |

=== Titles won by nation ===
2023 Titles won by nation

| Total | Nation | M25 | | M15 | | Total | |
| Total | Nation | S | D | S | D | S | D |
|---|---|---|---|---|---|---|---|
| 101 | France (FRA) | 32 | 20 | 27 | 22 | 59 | 42 |
| 98 | United States (USA) | 12 | 29 | 25 | 32 | 37 | 61 |
| 89 | Germany (GER) | 13 | 21 | 19 | 36 | 32 | 57 |
| 76 | Italy (ITA) | 10 | 19 | 18 | 29 | 28 | 48 |
| 65 | Great Britain (GBR) | 17 | 25 | 6 | 17 | 23 | 42 |
| 58 | Argentina (ARG) | 5 | 13 | 15 | 25 | 20 | 38 |
| 55 | Spain (ESP) | 19 | 11 | 13 | 12 | 32 | 23 |
| 51 | Australia (AUS) | 12 | 22 | 10 | 7 | 22 | 29 |
| 47 | Netherlands (NED) | 5 | 12 | 11 | 19 | 16 | 32 |
| 37 | Czech Republic (CZE) | 10 | 13 | 4 | 10 | 14 | 23 |
| 35 | Japan (JPN) | 8 | 13 | 5 | 9 | 13 | 22 |
| 34 | Switzerland (SUI) | 4 | 12 | 4 | 14 | 8 | 26 |
| 33 | China (CHN) | 7 | 9 | 5 | 12 | 12 | 21 |
| 29 | Romania (ROU) | 2 | 2 | 19 | 6 | 21 | 8 |
| 27 | Ukraine (UKR) | 1 | 10 | 4 | 12 | 5 | 22 |
| 24 | Portugal (POR) | 13 | 5 | 3 | 3 | 16 | 8 |
| 24 | Sweden (SWE) | 6 | 7 | 8 | 3 | 14 | 10 |
| 23 | Brazil (BRA) | 4 | 4 | 5 | 10 | 9 | 14 |
| 22 | India (IND) | 4 | 6 | 1 | 11 | 5 | 17 |
| 18 | Poland (POL) | 5 | 3 | 6 | 4 | 11 | 7 |
| 18 | Croatia (CRO) | 4 | 6 | 5 | 3 | 9 | 9 |
| 17 | Denmark (DEN) | 3 | 8 | 4 | 2 | 7 | 10 |
| 17 | Bulgaria (BUL) | | 3 | 5 | 9 | 5 | 12 |
| 16 | Belgium (BEL) | 7 | 1 | 3 | 5 | 10 | 6 |
| 16 | Canada (CAN) | 2 | 4 | 3 | 7 | 5 | 11 |
| 15 | Austria (AUT) | 4 | 5 | 1 | 5 | 5 | 10 |
| 15 | Chinese Taipei (TPE) | 3 | 7 | | 5 | 3 | 12 |
| 14 | Tunisia (TUN) | | 3 | 5 | 6 | 5 | 9 |
| 13 | South Korea (KOR) | 3 | 5 | 3 | 2 | 6 | 7 |
| 13 | Peru (PER) | 2 | 3 | 2 | 6 | 4 | 9 |
| 11 | South Africa (RSA) | | 3 | 2 | 6 | 2 | 9 |
| 10 | New Zealand (NZL) | 1 | 3 | | 6 | 1 | 9 |
| 9 | Indonesia (INA) | 1 | 2 | 1 | 5 | 2 | 7 |
| 9 | Thailand (THA) | | 2 | 2 | 5 | 2 | 7 |
| 8 | Turkey (TUR) | 3 | | 3 | 2 | 6 | 2 |
| 8 | Israel (ISR) | 2 | 4 | 2 | | 4 | 4 |
| 8 | Kazakhstan (KAZ) | 1 | | 3 | 4 | 4 | 4 |
| 7 | Egypt (EGY) | 1 | 1 | 4 | 1 | 5 | 2 |
| 7 | Serbia (SRB) | | | 4 | 3 | 4 | 3 |
| 7 | Ecuador (ECU) | 1 | 1 | 2 | 3 | 3 | 4 |
| 7 | Georgia (GEO) | 1 | | 1 | 5 | 2 | 5 |
| 7 | Uzbekistan (UZB) | 1 | 3 | | 3 | 1 | 6 |
| 7 | Slovakia (SVK) | | 1 | | 6 | 0 | 7 |
| 6 | Hungary (HUN) | 1 | | 4 | 1 | 5 | 1 |
| 6 | Luxembourg (LUX) | 2 | 3 | | 1 | 2 | 4 |
| 5 | Lebanon (LIB) | 2 | | 3 | | 5 | 0 |
| 5 | Monaco (MON) | 2 | | 3 | | 5 | 0 |
| 5 | Lithuania (LTU) | 2 | 1 | 2 | | 4 | 1 |
| 5 | Morocco (MAR) | 1 | | 2 | 2 | 3 | 2 |
| 5 | Dominican Republic (DOM) | | 2 | 2 | 1 | 2 | 3 |
| 5 | Finland (FIN) | | 1 | 2 | 2 | 2 | 3 |
| 5 | Slovenia (SLO) | | 1 | 2 | 2 | 2 | 3 |
| 5 | Philippines (PHI) | | 3 | | 2 | 0 | 5 |
| 5 | Uruguay (URU) | | | | 5 | 0 | 5 |
| 4 | Bolivia (BOL) | | 2 | 2 | | 2 | 2 |
| 4 | Greece (GRE) | | 1 | | 3 | 0 | 4 |
| 3 | North Macedonia (MKD) | 2 | 1 | | | 2 | 1 |
| 3 | Mexico (MEX) | 1 | | 1 | 1 | 2 | 1 |
| 3 | Barbados (BAR) | | | 2 | 1 | 2 | 1 |
| 3 | Syria (SYR) | | | 2 | 1 | 2 | 1 |
| 3 | Moldova (MDA) | | 2 | 1 | | 1 | 2 |
| 3 | Antigua and Barbuda (ATG) | | 2 | | 1 | 0 | 3 |
| 3 | Colombia (COL) | | 1 | | 2 | 0 | 3 |
| 3 | Cyprus (CYP) | | | | 3 | 0 | 3 |
| 2 | Hong Kong (HKG) | 1 | | 1 | | 2 | 0 |
| 2 | Bosnia and Herzegovina (BIH) | | | 2 | | 2 | 0 |
| 2 | Estonia (EST) | | | 2 | | 2 | 0 |
| 2 | Northern Mariana Islands (NMI) | | 1 | 1 | | 1 | 1 |
| 2 | Chile (CHI) | | | | 2 | 0 | 2 |
| 1 | Jamaica (JAM) | 1 | | | | 1 | 0 |
| 1 | Latvia (LAT) | 1 | | | | 1 | 0 |
| 1 | Ivory Coast (CIV) | | | 1 | | 1 | 0 |
| 1 | Malaysia (MAS) | | | 1 | | 1 | 0 |
| 1 | Senegal (SEN) | | | 1 | | 1 | 0 |
| 1 | Burundi (BDI) | | 1 | | | 0 | 1 |
| 1 | Venezuela (VEN) | | 1 | | | 0 | 1 |
| 1 | Algeria (ALG) | | | | 1 | 0 | 1 |
| 1 | Ireland (IRL) | | | | 1 | 0 | 1 |
| 1 | Paraguay (PAR) | | | | 1 | 0 | 1 |

== See also ==
- 2023 ATP Tour
- 2023 ATP Challenger Tour
- 2023 WTA Tour
- 2023 ITF Women's World Tennis Tour
