= 2023 GB Pro-Series Sunderland =

Tennis tournament

- Date: 23–30 January 2023
- Edition: 34th
- Category: 2023 ITF Men's World Tennis Tour; ITF Women's World Tennis Tour
- Prize money: $25,000 (men) $60,000 (women)
- Surface: Hard / Indoor
- Location: Sunderland, United Kingdom

Champions

Men's singles
- (France) Clément Chidekh

Women's singles
- (Belgium) Greet Minnen

Men's doubles
- (Israel) Edan Leshem / (Israel) Daniel Cukierman

Women's doubles
- (United Kingdom) Freya Christie / (United Kingdom) Ali Collins
← 2022 ·	GB Pro-Series Sunderland	· 2024 →

The 2023 GB Pro-Series Sunderland is a professional tennis tournament played on indoor hard courts. It was part of the 2023 ITF Women's World Tennis Tour as a W60 tournament, and part of the 2023 ITF Men's World Tennis Tour as a M25 tournament. It took place in Sunderland, United Kingdom between 23 and 30 January 2023.

== Champions ==
=== Men's singles ===
- (France) Clément Chidekh def. (United Kingdom) Anton Matusevich walkover.

=== Men's doubles ===
- (Israel) Edan Leshem / (Israel) Daniel Cukierman def. (United Kingdom) Anton Matusevich / (United Kingdom) Joshua Paris 6–3, 7–6^{(7–5)}.

=== Women's singles ===
- (Belgium) Greet Minnen def. (Germany) Mona Barthel 6–2, 1–6, 6–0.

=== Women's doubles ===
- (United Kingdom) Freya Christie / (United Kingdom) Ali Collins def. (Belgium) Magali Kempen / (United Kingdom) Eden Silva 6–3, 7–6^{(7–5)}.

== Women's singles main draw entrants ==
=== Seeds ===
Country	Player	Rank^{1}	Seed
ESP	Marina Bassols Ribera	122	1
FRA	Harmony Tan	142	2
GRE	Despina Papamichail	157	3
GBR	Yuriko Miyazaki	178	~~4~~
ESP	Jéssica Bouzas Maneiro	183	5
AUT	Sinja Kraus	192	6
CZE	Barbora Palicová	205	7
GBR	Sonay Kartal	206	8

- ^{1} Rankings are as of 16 January 2023.

=== Other entrants ===
The following players received wildcards into the singles main draw:

- (United Kingdom) Freya Christie
- (United Kingdom) Sonay Kartal
- (United Kingdom) Eliz Maloney

The following player received entry into the singles main draw using a special ranking:

- (Netherlands) Bibiane Schoofs

The following players received entry from the qualifying draw:

- (United Kingdom) Jasmine Conway
- (United Kingdom) Danielle Daley
- (United Kingdom) Katy Dunne
- (Germany) Kathleen Kanev
- (Estonia) Elena Malõgina
- (Sweden) Kajsa Rinaldo Persson
- (Bulgaria) Isabella Shinikova
- (Slovakia) Katarína Strešnáková

The following player received entry into the singles main draw as a lucky loser:

- (Netherlands) Jasmijn Gimbrère
