= 2019 Kiskút Open – Doubles =

Doubles
- 2019 Kiskút Open

Final
- Champions: (Romania) Irina Bara (Belgium) Maryna Zanevska
- Runners-up: (Uzbekistan) Akgul Amanmuradova (Romania) Elena Bogdan
- Score: 3–6, 6–2, [10–8]

Events
| Singles | Doubles |
| Kiskút Open | · 2020 → |

This was the first edition of the tournament.

Irina Bara and Maryna Zanevska won the title, defeating Akgul Amanmuradova and Elena Bogdan in the final, 3–6, 6–2, [10–8].

== Seeds ==
1. (Spain) Georgina García Pérez / (Hungary) Fanny Stollár (first round, retired)
2. (Russia) Amina Anshba / (Czech Republic) Anastasia Dețiuc (semifinals)
3. (Romania) Nicoleta Dascălu / (Montenegro) Danka Kovinić (semifinals)
4. (Uzbekistan) Akgul Amanmuradova / (Romania) Elena Bogdan (final)

== Draw ==
=== Key ===
- Q = Qualifier
- WC = Wild card
- LL = Lucky loser
- Alt = Alternate
- SE = Special exempt
- PR = Protected ranking
- ITF = ITF entry
- JE = Junior exempt
- w/o = Walkover
- r = Retired
- d = Defaulted
- SR = Special ranking

=== Draw ===
First round
1 | (Spain) G García Pérez (Hungary) F Stollár | 3 | 0^{r}
(Romania) I Bara (Belgium) M Zanevska | 6 | 1
(Hungary) RL Jani (Argentina) P Ormaechea | 5 | 6 | [10]
(Poland) M Chwalińska (Hungary) A Nagy | 7 | 3 | [7]
3 | (Romania) N Dascălu (Montenegro) D Kovinić | w/o
(Slovakia) V Juhászová (Austria) M Klaffner
(Hungary) A Bondár (Slovakia) R Šramková | 0 | 6 | [10]
(Brazil) G Cé (Switzerland) S Waltert | 6 | 4 | [8]
(Ukraine) M Chernyshova (Slovakia) C Škamlová | w/o
WC | (Hungary) Á Bukta (Brazil) T Pereira
WC | (Hungary) B Békefi (Hungary) D Drahota-Szabó | 3 | 4
4 | (Uzbekistan) A Amanmuradova (Romania) E Bogdan | 6 | 6
(Romania) M Bulgaru (Romania) IG Ghioroaie | 6 | 6
(Czech Republic) J Marková (Chile) D Seguel | 4 | 2
(Slovenia) N Potočnik (Slovenia) N Radišič | 4 | 3
2 | (Russia) A Anshba (Czech Republic) A Dețiuc | 6 | 6

Quarterfinals
(Romania) I Bara (Belgium) M Zanevska | 6 | 6
(Hungary) RL Jani (Argentina) P Ormaechea | 2 | 3
3 | (Romania) N Dascălu (Montenegro) D Kovinić | 6 | 6
(Hungary) A Bondár (Slovakia) R Šramková | 4 | 2
(Ukraine) M Chernyshova (Slovakia) C Škamlová | 2 | 6^{4}
4 | (Uzbekistan) A Amanmuradova (Romania) E Bogdan | 6 | 7^{7}
(Romania) M Bulgaru (Romania) IG Ghioroaie | 2 | 3
2 | (Russia) A Anshba (Czech Republic) A Dețiuc | 6 | 6

Semifinals
(Romania) I Bara (Belgium) M Zanevska | 7^{7} | 6
3 | (Romania) N Dascălu (Montenegro) D Kovinić | 6^{3} | 1
4 | (Uzbekistan) A Amanmuradova (Romania) E Bogdan | 2 | 6 | [10]
2 | (Russia) A Anshba (Czech Republic) A Dețiuc | 6 | 4 | [4]

Final
(Romania) I Bara (Belgium) M Zanevska | 3 | 6 | [10]
4 | (Uzbekistan) A Amanmuradova (Romania) E Bogdan | 6 | 2 | [8]
