= 2023 GB Pro-Series Sunderland – Women's singles =

Women's singles
- 2023 GB Pro-Series Sunderland

Final
- Champion: (Belgium) Greet Minnen
- Runner-up: (Germany) Mona Barthel
- Score: 6–2, 1–6, 6–0

Events
Singles	men	women
Doubles	men	women
← 2022 ·	GB Pro-Series Sunderland	· 2024 →

Viktoriya Tomova was the defending champion, but chose not to participate.

Greet Minnen won the title, defeating Mona Barthel in the final, 6–2, 1–6, 6–0.

== Seeds ==
1. (Spain) Marina Bassols Ribera (first round)
2. (France) Harmony Tan (second round)
3. (Greece) Despina Papamichail (second round)
4. (United Kingdom) Yuriko Miyazaki (second round)
5. (Spain) Jéssica Bouzas Maneiro (quarterfinals)
6. (Austria) Sinja Kraus (first round)
7. (Czech Republic) Barbora Palicová (second round)
8. (United Kingdom) Sonay Kartal (quarterfinals)

== Draw ==
=== Key ===
- Q = Qualifier
- WC = Wild card
- LL = Lucky loser
- Alt = Alternate
- SE = Special exempt
- PR = Protected ranking
- ITF = ITF entry
- JE = Junior exempt
- w/o = Walkover
- r = Retired
- d = Defaulted
- SR = Special ranking

=== Finals ===
Semifinals
(Germany) Mona Barthel	6	6
(Belgium) Magali Kempen	3	3
(Netherlands) Lesley Pattinama Kerkhove	6^{6}	4
(Belgium) Greet Minnen	7^{8}	6

Final
(Germany) Mona Barthel	2	6	0
(Belgium) Greet Minnen	6	1	6

=== Top half ===
First round
1	(Spain) M Bassols Ribera	7^{7}	3	3
Q	(Estonia) E Malõgina	6^{5}	6	6
WC	(United Kingdom) F Christie	3	5
(Germany) M Barthel	6	7
Q	(United Kingdom) D Daley	1	5
Q	(Bulgaria) I Shinikova	6	7
(Hungary) N Szabanin	4	6	3
8/WC	(United Kingdom) S Kartal	6	4	6
3	(Greece) D Papamichail	6	7^{7}
(Germany) L Papadakis	4	6^{2}
(United Kingdom) M Lumsden	3	6	1
(Belgium) M Kempen	6	3	6
Q	(Sweden) K Rinaldo Persson	6	3	6
(Chinese Taipei) J Garland	2	6	3
WC	(United Kingdom) E Maloney	3	4
5	(Spain) J Bouzas Maneiro	6	6

Second round
Q	(Estonia) E Malõgina	6	2	5
(Germany) M Barthel	4	6	7
Q	(Bulgaria) I Shinikova	3	2
8/WC	(United Kingdom) S Kartal	6	6
3	(Greece) D Papamichail	4	0
(Belgium) M Kempen	6	6
Q	(Sweden) K Rinaldo Persson	3	4
5	(Spain) J Bouzas Maneiro	6	6

Quarterfinals
(Germany) M Barthel	6	6
8/WC	(United Kingdom) S Kartal	1	2
(Belgium) M Kempen	2	6	7
5	(Spain) J Bouzas Maneiro	6	3	5

Semifinals
(Germany) M Barthel	6	6
(Belgium) M Kempen	3	3

=== Bottom half ===
First round
6	(Austria) S Kraus	4	2
(United Kingdom) E Silva	6	6
LL	(Netherlands) J Gimbrère	1^{r}
Q	(United Kingdom) K Dunne	2
Q	(Germany) K Kanev	2	7^{7}	1
(Netherlands) L Pattinama Kerkhove	6	6^{4}	6
(Turkey) P Özgen	2	3
4	(United Kingdom) Y Miyazaki	6	6
7	(Czech Republic) B Palicová	2	6	6
Q	(United Kingdom) J Conway	6	4	3
(Italy) A Moratelli	6	1
Q	(Slovakia) K Strešnáková	1	0^{r}
SR	(Netherlands) B Schoofs	6	2	4
(Belgium) G Minnen	4	6	6
(Liechtenstein) K von Deichmann	1	6	3
2	(France) H Tan	6	3	6

Second round
(United Kingdom) E Silva	3	6	3
LL	(Netherlands) J Gimbrère	6	0	6
(Netherlands) L Pattinama Kerkhove	5	6	6
4	(United Kingdom) Y Miyazaki	7	2	2
7	(Czech Republic) B Palicová	4	6^{3}
(Italy) A Moratelli	6	7^{7}
(Belgium) G Minnen	3	6	6
2	(France) H Tan	6	3	2

Quarterfinals
LL	(Netherlands) J Gimbrère	7	5	4
(Netherlands) L Pattinama Kerkhove	5	7	6
(Italy) A Moratelli	4	0
(Belgium) G Minnen	6	6

Semifinals
(Netherlands) L Pattinama Kerkhove	6^{6}	4
(Belgium) G Minnen	7^{8}	6
