= 2023 GB Pro-Series Sunderland – Women's doubles =

Women's doubles
- 2023 GB Pro-Series Sunderland

Final
- Champions: (United Kingdom) Freya Christie (United Kingdom) Ali Collins
- Runners-up: (Belgium) Magali Kempen (United Kingdom) Eden Silva
- Score: 6–3, 7–6^{(7–5)}

Events
Singles	men	women
Doubles	men	women
← 2022 ·	GB Pro-Series Sunderland	· 2024 →

Alicia Barnett and Olivia Nicholls were the defending champions but chose not to participate.

Freya Christie and Ali Collins won the title, defeating Magali Kempen and Eden Silva in the final, 6–3, 7–6^{(7–5)}.

== Seeds ==
1. (United Kingdom) Freya Christie / (United Kingdom) Ali Collins (champions)
2. (United Kingdom) Maia Lumsden / (Estonia) Elena Malõgina (quarterfinals)
3. (United Kingdom) Emily Appleton / (United Kingdom) Yuriko Miyazaki (first round)
4. (Spain) Marina Bassols Ribera / (Greece) Despina Papamichail (first round, withdrew)

== Draw ==
=== Key ===
- Q = Qualifier
- WC = Wild card
- LL = Lucky loser
- Alt = Alternate
- SE = Special exempt
- PR = Protected ranking
- ITF = ITF entry
- JE = Junior exempt
- w/o = Walkover
- r = Retired
- d = Defaulted
- SR = Special ranking

First round
(Chinese Taipei) J Garland (Bulgaria) I Shinikova	6	6
(United Kingdom) T Prisadnikova (United Kingdom) F Simpson	0	3
3	(United Kingdom) E Appleton (United Kingdom) Y Miyazaki	3	4
(Lithuania) A Lukošiūtė (United Kingdom) E Maloney	6	6
(Italy) A Moratelli (Hungary) N Szabanin	2	3
(United Kingdom) L John-Baptiste (Slovakia) K Strešnáková	6	6
(United Kingdom) S Anane (United Kingdom) J Matthews	0	2
(United Kingdom) A Amos (United Kingdom) E Wilson	6	6
(Belgium) M Kempen (United Kingdom) E Silva	w/o
4	(Spain) M Bassols Ribera (Greece) D Papamichail
(Germany) L Papadakis (Netherlands) L Pattinama Kerkhove	3	5
(Netherlands) J Gimbrère (Netherlands) B Schoofs	6	7
(Spain) L Cortez Llorca (Germany) K Kanev	1	4
2	(United Kingdom) M Lumsden (Estonia) E Malõgina	6	6

Quarterfinals
1	(United Kingdom) F Christie (United Kingdom) A Collins	6	6
(Chinese Taipei) J Garland (Bulgaria) I Shinikova	1	1
(Lithuania) A Lukošiūtė (United Kingdom) E Maloney	w/o
(United Kingdom) L John-Baptiste (Slovakia) K Strešnáková
(United Kingdom) A Amos (United Kingdom) E Wilson	3	2
(Belgium) M Kempen (United Kingdom) E Silva	6	6
(Netherlands) J Gimbrère (Netherlands) B Schoofs	6	6
2	(United Kingdom) M Lumsden (Estonia) E Malõgina	2	4

Semifinals
1	(United Kingdom) F Christie (United Kingdom) A Collins	7^{9}	6
(Lithuania) A Lukošiūtė (United Kingdom) E Maloney	6^{7}	2
(Belgium) M Kempen (United Kingdom) E Silva	2	7^{7}	[10]
(Netherlands) J Gimbrère (Netherlands) B Schoofs	6	6^{1}	[6]

Final
1	(United Kingdom) F Christie (United Kingdom) A Collins	6	7^{7}
(Belgium) M Kempen (United Kingdom) E Silva	3	6^{5}
