= 2019 Kiskút Open II – Singles =

Singles
- 2019 Kiskút Open II

Final
- Champion: (Montenegro) Danka Kovinić
- Runner-up: (Romania) Irina-Camelia Begu
- Score: 6–4, 3–6, 6–3

Events
Singles	Doubles
Kiskút Open	· 2020 →

This was the first edition of the tournament.

Danka Kovinić won the title, defeating Irina-Camelia Begu in the final, 6–4, 3–6, 6–3.

== Seeds ==
1. (Spain) Paula Badosa (first round)
2. (Spain) Aliona Bolsova (second round)
3. (Montenegro) Danka Kovinić (champion)
4. (Romania) Irina-Camelia Begu (final)
5. (Ukraine) Katarina Zavatska (semifinals, retired)
6. (Romania) Patricia Maria Țig (first round)
7. (Italy) Jasmine Paolini (quarterfinals)
8. (Germany) Tamara Korpatsch (quarterfinals)

== Draw ==
=== Key ===
- Q = Qualifier
- WC = Wild card
- LL = Lucky loser
- Alt = Alternate
- SE = Special exempt
- PR = Protected ranking
- ITF = ITF entry
- JE = Junior exempt
- w/o = Walkover
- r = Retired
- d = Defaulted
- SR = Special ranking

=== Finals ===
Semifinals
5	(Ukraine) Katarina Zavatska	0	1^{r}
3	(Montenegro) Danka Kovinić	6	4
4	(Romania) Irina-Camelia Begu	6	6
(Paraguay) Verónica Cepede Royg	3	1

Final
3	(Montenegro) Danka Kovinić	6	3	6
4	(Romania) Irina-Camelia Begu	4	6	3

=== Top half ===
First round
1	(Spain) P Badosa	6	0	1
Q	(Russia) V Kan	4	6	6
Q	(Romania) M Bulgaru	4	6	3
(Slovenia) K Juvan	6	4	6
Q	(Poland) M Chwalińska	1	1
SE	(Romania) I Bara	6	6
WC	(Hungary) F Stollár	4	2
5	(Ukraine) K Zavatska	6	6
3	(Montenegro) D Kovinić	6	6
(Slovakia) R Šramková	3	0
(Slovakia) K Kučová	5	5
(Bulgaria) V Tomova	7	7
Q	(Hungary) D Drahota-Szabó	4	6^{7}
Q	(Belgium) M Benoît	6	7^{9}
WC	(Hungary) A Bondár	2	4
8	(Germany) T Korpatsch	6	6

Second round
Q	(Russia) V Kan	1	2
(Slovenia) K Juvan	6	6
SE	(Romania) I Bara	0	0^{r}
5	(Ukraine) K Zavatska	6	1
3	(Montenegro) D Kovinić	6	2	6
(Bulgaria) V Tomova	4	6	3
Q	(Belgium) M Benoît	1	3
8	(Germany) T Korpatsch	6	6

Quarterfinals
(Slovenia) K Juvan	1	4
5	(Ukraine) K Zavatska	6	6
3	(Montenegro) D Kovinić	7^{7}	6
8	(Germany) T Korpatsch	6^{5}	1

Semifinals
5	(Ukraine) K Zavatska	0	1^{r}
3	(Montenegro) D Kovinić	6	4

=== Bottom half ===
First round
7	(Italy) J Paolini	6	7
(Bulgaria) I Shinikova	2	5
PR	(Sweden) S Celik	4	1
Q	(Romania) IG Ghioroaie	6	6
Q	(Romania) A Cadanțu	6	0
Q	(Hungary) G Arn	0	0^{r}
(Austria) B Haas	6^{2}	0^{r}
4	(Romania) I-C Begu	7^{7}	1
6	(Romania) PM Țig	4	1
(Italy) M Trevisan	6	6
WC	(Hungary) D Gálfi	3	6	4
(Slovakia) J Čepelová	6	3	6
WC	(Hungary) RL Jani	4	2
(Paraguay) V Cepede Royg	6	6
(Poland) K Kawa	5	6	3
2	(Spain) A Bolsova	7	2	6

Second round
7	(Italy) J Paolini	3	7^{7}	6
Q	(Romania) IG Ghioroaie	6	6^{4}	3
Q	(Romania) A Cadanțu	3	3
4	(Romania) I-C Begu	6	6
(Italy) M Trevisan	6^{4}	6	6
(Slovakia) J Čepelová	7^{7}	3	4
(Paraguay) V Cepede Royg	4	6	7^{7}
2	(Spain) A Bolsova	6	3	6^{4}

Quarterfinals
7	(Italy) J Paolini	6^{7}	2
4	(Romania) I-C Begu	7^{9}	6
(Italy) M Trevisan	3	0
(Paraguay) V Cepede Royg	6	6

Semifinals
4	(Romania) I-C Begu	6	6
(Paraguay) V Cepede Royg	3	1
