= GB Pro-Series Sunderland =

- 2023 GB Pro-Series Sunderland

ITF Women's Tour
- Event name: GB Pro-Series Sunderland
- Location: Sunderland, United Kingdom
- Category: ITF Women's World Tennis Tour
- Surface: Hard / indoors
- Draw: 32S/32Q/16D
- Prize money: $60,000 / $25,000

The GB Pro-Series Sunderland are tournaments for professional female tennis players played on indoor hardcourts. The events are classified as $60,000 and $25,000 ITF Women's World Tennis Tour tournaments and have been held in Sunderland, United Kingdom, since 1996.

== Past finals ==
=== Singles ===
Year	Champion	Runner-up	Score
2025	(Czech Republic) Nikola Bartůňková	(United Kingdom) Amelia Rajecki	6–4, 3–6, 6–3
2024 (1)	(Switzerland) Valentina Ryser	(Czech Republic) Nikola Bartůňková	6–3, 7–6^{(8–6)}
2023 (2)	(Switzerland) Valentina Ryser	(Estonia) Elena Malõgina	6–4, 7–5
2023 (1)	(Belgium) Greet Minnen	(Germany) Mona Barthel	6–2, 1–6, 6–0
2021–22	Not held		
2020	(Bulgaria) Viktoriya Tomova	(United Kingdom) Emma Raducanu	4–6, 6–4, 6–3
2019	(Romania) Laura Ioana Paar	(United Kingdom) Harriet Dart	7–5, 4–6, 6–2
2018	not held		
2017	(United Kingdom) Maia Lumsden	(United Kingdom) Freya Christie	6–4, 6–0
2016	(Liechtenstein) Kathinka von Deichmann	(France) Manon Arcangioli	6–3, 7–6^{(7–2)}
2015	(Republic of Ireland) Amy Bowtell	(Russia) Marta Sirotkina	6–4, 6–3
2014	(Belgium) An-Sophie Mestach	(Switzerland) Viktorija Golubic	6–1, 6–4
2013	(Germany) Anna-Lena Friedsam	(Belgium) Alison Van Uytvanck	6–2, 7–6^{(7–4)}
2012	(Germany) Sarah Gronert	(Germany) Annika Beck	3–6, 6–2, 6–3
2011	(Belgium) Alison Van Uytvanck	(United Kingdom) Tara Moore	6–4, 6–1
2010	(United Kingdom) Anna Fitzpatrick	(United Kingdom) Samantha Murray	6–2, 3–6, 7–5
2009	(Hungary) Tímea Babos	(Croatia) Matea Mezak	7–6^{(7–2)}, 6–4
2008 (2)	(United Kingdom) Laura Robson	(United Kingdom) Samantha Vickers	6–3, 6–2
2008 (1)	(Russia) Elena Kulikova	(Sweden) Johanna Larsson	6–2, 7–6^{(8–6)}
2007 (3)	(Belarus) Iryna Kuryanovich	(Australia) Christina Wheeler	6–1, 6–0
2007 (2)	(Switzerland) Gaëlle Widmer	(United Kingdom) Anna Fitzpatrick	6–4, 6–1
2007 (1)	(United Kingdom) Karen Lamb	(Spain) Carla Suárez Navarro	6–4, 6–2
2006 (3)	(Germany) Martina Pavelec	(Finland) Piia Suomalainen	6–2, 6–4
2006 (2)	(Switzerland) Gaëlle Widmer	(United Kingdom) Naomi Cavaday	6–1, 3–6, 6–1
2006 (1)	(Netherlands) Elise Tamaëla	(United Kingdom) Anne Keothavong	7–6^{(8–6)}, 6–3
2005 (3)	(Estonia) Margit Rüütel	(Finland) Piia Suomalainen	7–5, 6–0
2005 (2)	(Germany) Kristina Barrois	(Estonia) Anett Kaasik	7–6^{(7–2)}, 6–3
2005 (1)	(Sweden) Sofia Arvidsson	(Russia) Irina Bulykina	6–1, 6–1
2004 (2)	(Netherlands) Tessy van de Ven	(Estonia) Margit Rüütel	4–6, 6–0, 6–3
2004 (1)	(Estonia) Kaia Kanepi	(Russia) Anna Chakvetadze	7–6^{(7–5)}, 6–0
2003	(Austria) Yvonne Meusburger	(Sweden) Hanna Nooni	4–6, 6–3, 6–1
2002	no information		
2001	(Sweden) Sofia Arvidsson	(France) Olivia Sanchez	6–3, 2–6, 6–0
2000	(United Kingdom) Hannah Collin	(France) Olivia Sanchez	6–3, 6–3
1999	(India) Manisha Malhotra	(United Kingdom) Nicola Payne	2–6, 6–1, 6–0
1998	(Germany) Mia Buric	(Russia) Julia Lutrova	6–2, 7–6
1997 (2)	(South Africa) Mareze Joubert	(Russia) Natalia Egorova	6–3, 1–6, 7–5
1997 (1)	(United Kingdom) Lorna Woodroffe	(Italy) Alessia Lombardi	6–4, 2–6, 6–4
1996	(Romania) Raluca Sandu	(United Kingdom) Samantha Smith	4–6, 7–5, 6–4

=== Doubles ===
Year	Champions	Runners-up	Score
2025	(United Kingdom) Amelia Rajecki (United States) Anna Rogers	(South Korea) Park So-hyun (Hong Kong) Cody Wong	2–6, 6–3, [10–8]
2024 (1)	(Finland) Laura Hietaranta (United Kingdom) Ella McDonald	(France) Julie Belgraver (Slovakia) Katarína Strešnáková	6–4, 6–1
2023 (2)	(United Kingdom) Freya Christie (Estonia) Elena Malõgina	(Georgia (country)) Mariam Bolkvadze (United Kingdom) Samantha Murray Sharan	6–0, 4–6, [10–4]
2023 (1)	(United Kingdom) Freya Christie (United Kingdom) Ali Collins	(Belgium) Magali Kempen (United Kingdom) Eden Silva	6–3, 7–6^{(7–5)}
2021–22	Not held		
2020	(United Kingdom) Alicia Barnett (United Kingdom) Olivia Nicholls	(Spain) Celia Cerviño Ruiz (Spain) María Gutiérrez Carrasco	6–4, 7–6^{(8–6)}
2019	(Poland) Maja Chwalińska (Norway) Ulrikke Eikeri	(United States) Emina Bektas (United Kingdom) Tara Moore	6–4, 3–6, [11–9]
2018	not held		
2017	(Greece) Eleni Kordolaimi (United Kingdom) Maia Lumsden	(United Kingdom) Alicia Barnett (United Kingdom) Sarah Beth Grey	2–6, 6–2, [11–9]
2016	(United Kingdom) Emily Arbuthnott (Denmark) Emilie Francati	(France) Manon Arcangioli (United Kingdom) Harriet Dart	6–3, 4–6, [10–5]
2015	(United Kingdom) Jocelyn Rae (United Kingdom) Anna Smith	(Poland) Justyna Jegiołka (Sweden) Cornelia Lister	6–3, 6–1
2014	(United Kingdom) Jocelyn Rae (United Kingdom) Anna Smith	(Hungary) Ágnes Bukta (Bulgaria) Viktoriya Tomova	6–1, 6–1
2013	(Sweden) Hilda Melander (Sweden) Sandra Roma	(Republic of Ireland) Amy Bowtell (United Kingdom) Lucy Brown	6–0, 6–3
2012	(Poland) Justyna Jegiołka (Latvia) Diāna Marcinkēviča	(Italy) Martina Caciotti (Italy) Anastasia Grymalska	6–4, 2–6, [10–6]
2011	(Netherlands) Eva Wacanno (United States) Caitlin Whoriskey	(Czech Republic) Martina Borecká (Czech Republic) Petra Krejsová	6–2, 4–6, [10–8]
2010	(United Kingdom) Amanda Elliott (United Kingdom) Anna Fitzpatrick	(United Kingdom) Tara Moore (United Kingdom) Francesca Stephenson	6–2, 6–3
2009	(United Kingdom) Jennifer Ren (United Kingdom) Jessica Ren	(Netherlands) Daniëlle Harmsen (Netherlands) Josanne van Bennekom	3–6, 6–4, [10–8]
2008 (2)	(Netherlands) Daniëlle Harmsen (Netherlands) Kim Kilsdonk	(United Kingdom) Katharina Brown (United Kingdom) Tara Moore	6–7^{(4–7)}, 6–4, [10–4]
2008 (1)	(Sweden) Johanna Larsson (United Kingdom) Anna Smith	(Slovakia) Martina Babáková (Czech Republic) Iveta Gerlová	6–1, 3–6, [10–3]
2007 (3)	(United Kingdom) Katharina Brown (United Kingdom) Elizabeth Thomas	(Netherlands) Daniëlle Harmsen (Netherlands) Renée Reinhard	6–3, 6–1
2007 (2)	(United Kingdom) Anna Hawkins (United Kingdom) Jane O'Donoghue	(Germany) Ria Dörnemann (United Kingdom) Emily Webley-Smith	6–4, 6–7^{(5–7)}, 6–3
2007 (1)	(United Kingdom) Danielle Brown (United Kingdom) Elizabeth Thomas	(Romania) Raluca Ciulei (United States) Katie Ruckert	6–4, 3–6, 6–3
2006 (3)	(Finland) Piia Suomalainen (Finland) Katariina Tuohimaa	(Germany) Laura Haberkorn (Germany) Martina Pavelec	6–3, 6–4
2006 (2)	(Germany) Carmen Klaschka (Germany) Korina Perkovic	(Sweden) Nadja Roma (Finland) Piia Suomalainen	6–2, 6–3
2006 (1)	(Netherlands) Kim Kilsdonk (Netherlands) Elise Tamaëla	(South Africa) Surina De Beer (Japan) Ayami Takase	7–5, 6–4
2005 (3)	(United Kingdom) Sarah Coles (Czech Republic) Kateřina Vaňková	(United Kingdom) Melissa Berry (United Kingdom) Lindsay Cunningham	2–6, 6–1, 6–4
2005 (2)	(Austria) Verena Amesbauer (Czech Republic) Veronika Chvojková	(South Africa) Lizaan du Plessis (United Kingdom) Rebecca Llewellyn	6–3, 6–4
2005 (1)	(Sweden) Sofia Arvidsson (Germany) Martina Müller	(Serbia and Montenegro) Katarina Mišić (Serbia and Montenegro) Dragana Zarić	6–2, 6–3
2004 (2)	(United Kingdom) Elena Baltacha (United Kingdom) Jane O'Donoghue	(Slovakia) Eva Fislová (Slovakia) Stanislava Hrozenská	6–1, 4–6, 6–2
2004 (1)	(Republic of Ireland) Claire Curran (Netherlands) Kim Kilsdonk	(United Kingdom) Helen Crook (Germany) Martina Müller	6–4, 3–6, 6–3
2003	(Republic of Ireland) Claire Curran (Sweden) Helena Ejeson	(Netherlands) Kim Kilsdonk (Australia) Nicole Kriz	6–2, 6–1
2002	no information		
2001	(Republic of Ireland) Yvonne Doyle (Republic of Ireland) Karen Nugent	(United Kingdom) Cristelle Grier (United Kingdom) Anna Hawkins	4–6, 6–2, 6–1
2000	(Germany) Susi Bensch (United Kingdom) Nicola Payne	(France) Elsa Morel (Switzerland) Petra Spaar	6–4, 6–4
1999	(United Kingdom) Claire Carter (Denmark) Rikke Faurfelt	(United Kingdom) Julie Hanger (United Kingdom) Jheni Osman	7–6, 6–3
1998	(United Kingdom) Lizzy Jelfs (South Africa) Mareze Joubert	(United Kingdom) Helen Crook (United Kingdom) Victoria Davies	6–1, 6–1
1997 (2)	(United Kingdom) Helen Crook (South Africa) Mareze Joubert	(United Kingdom) Victoria Davies (Israel) Limor Gabai	6–2, 6–4
1997 (1)	(United Kingdom) Shirli-Ann Siddall (United Kingdom) Amanda Wainwright	(United Kingdom) Megan Miller (United Kingdom) Rachel Viollet	6–3, 6–3
1996	(United Kingdom) Julie Pullin (United Kingdom) Lorna Woodroffe	(Australia) Melissa Beadman (Estonia) Helen Laupa	6–4, 7–5
