= 2023 Kiskút Open – Singles =

Singles
- 2023 Kiskút Open

Final
- Champion: (Serbia) Hamad Međedović
- Runner-up: (Croatia) Nino Serdarušić
- Score: 6–4, 6–3

Events
Singles	Doubles
Kiskút Open	· 2024 →

This was the first edition of the tournament.

Hamad Međedović won the title after defeating Nino Serdarušić 6–4, 6–3 in the final.

== Seeds ==
1. (Hungary) Fábián Marozsán (semifinals)
2. (Italy) Flavio Cobolli (quarterfinals)
3. (France) Manuel Guinard (second round)
4. (Hungary) Zsombor Piros (quarterfinals)
5. (Bulgaria) Adrian Andreev (quarterfinals, retired)
6. (Bosnia and Herzegovina) Damir Džumhur (quarterfinals)
7. (Serbia) Miljan Zekić (withdrew)
8. (Serbia) Hamad Međedović (champion)
9. (France) Evan Furness (semifinals)

== Draw ==
=== Key ===
- Q = Qualifier
- WC = Wild card
- LL = Lucky loser
- Alt = Alternate
- SE = Special exempt
- PR = Protected ranking
- ITF = ITF entry
- JE = Junior exempt
- w/o = Walkover
- r = Retired
- d = Defaulted
- SR = Special ranking

=== Finals ===
Semifinals
1	(Hungary) Fábián Marozsán	3	7^{7}	6^{4}
(Croatia) Nino Serdarušić	6	6^{5}	7^{7}
8	(Serbia) Hamad Međedović	6	6
9	(France) Evan Furness	1	2

Final
(Croatia) Nino Serdarušić	4	3
8	(Serbia) Hamad Međedović	6	6

=== Top half ===
First round
1	(Hungary) F Marozsán	6	4
(Croatia) M Poljičak	1	2^{r}
Alt	(Italy) S Caruso	3	1
A Vatutin	6	6
Q	(Bosnia and Herzegovina) M Bašić	6	3
WC	(Hungary) Péter Fajta	4	0^{r}
Q	(Austria) G Melzer	7^{7}	3	6^{2}
5	(Bulgaria) A Andreev	6^{4}	6	7^{7}
3	(France) M Guinard	2	6	6
(Romania) FC Jianu	6	2	1
(Hungary) M Valkusz	6	3	1^{r}
(Croatia) N Serdarušić	4	6	4
WC	(Hungary) Matyas Füle	2	1
Q	(Ukraine) O Prihodko	6	6
(France) T Droguet	6	1	2
6	(Bosnia and Herzegovina) D Džumhur	4	6	6

Second round
1	(Hungary) F Marozsán	6	6
A Vatutin	2	2
Q	(Bosnia and Herzegovina) M Bašić	2	6^{4}
5	(Bulgaria) A Andreev	6	7^{7}
3	(France) M Guinard	6	2	4
(Croatia) N Serdarušić	4	6	6
Q	(Ukraine) O Prihodko	3	6	3
6	(Bosnia and Herzegovina) D Džumhur	6	1	6

Quarterfinals
1	(Hungary) F Marozsán	6	3
5	(Bulgaria) A Andreev	1	1^{r}
(Croatia) N Serdarušić	6	6
6	(Bosnia and Herzegovina) D Džumhur	4	3

Semifinals
1	(Hungary) F Marozsán	3	7^{7}	6^{4}
(Croatia) N Serdarušić	6	6^{5}	7^{7}

=== Bottom half ===
First round
8	(Serbia) H Međedović	6^{4}	6	6
I Gakhov	7^{7}	4	4
(Romania) ND Ionel	6	6
WC	(Hungary) G Madarász	1	0
Q	(Italy) J Ocleppo	6^{4}	3
(Poland) D Michalski	7^{7}	6
(Belgium) K Coppejans	7^{7}	1	3
4	(Hungary) Z Piros	6^{5}	6	6
9	(France) E Furness	6	0
Q	(Morocco) E Benchetrit	3	0^{r}
(Canada) S Diez	6	7
(Portugal) J Domingues	4	5
(Spain) N Sánchez Izquierdo	4	7^{7}	4
(Italy) A Giannessi	6	6^{3}	6
Q	(Lebanon) B Hassan	7	2	4
2	(Italy) F Cobolli	5	6	6

Second round
8	(Serbia) H Međedović	6	2	7^{7}
(Romania) ND Ionel	4	6	6^{1}
(Poland) D Michalski	1^{r}
4	(Hungary) Z Piros	4
9	(France) E Furness	6	5	6
(Canada) S Diez	3	7	4
(Italy) A Giannessi	4	0
2	(Italy) F Cobolli	6	6

Quarterfinals
8	(Serbia) H Međedović	7	5	6
4	(Hungary) Z Piros	5	7	4
9	(France) E Furness	7	6
2	(Italy) F Cobolli	5	2

Semifinals
8	(Serbia) H Međedović	6	6
9	(France) E Furness	1	2
