= 2019 Kiskút Open – Singles =

Singles
- 2019 Kiskút Open

Final
- Champion: (Romania) Nicoleta Dascălu
- Runner-up: (Romania) Irina Bara
- Score: 7–5, 6–2

Events
Singles	Doubles
Kiskút Open	· 2020 →

This was the first edition of the tournament.

Nicoleta Dascălu won the title, defeating Irina Bara in an all-Romanian final, 7–5, 6–2.

== Seeds ==
1. (Montenegro) Danka Kovinić (quarterfinals)
2. (Romania) Irina-Camelia Begu (semifinals)
3. (Ukraine) Katarina Zavatska (first round)
4. (Poland) Katarzyna Kawa (quarterfinals)
5. (Bulgaria) Viktoriya Tomova (second round)
6. (Paraguay) Verónica Cepede Royg (quarterfinals)
7. (Slovakia) Kristína Kučová (first round)
8. (Slovakia) Rebecca Šramková (quarterfinals)

== Draw ==
=== Key ===
- Q = Qualifier
- WC = Wild card
- LL = Lucky loser
- Alt = Alternate
- SE = Special exempt
- PR = Protected ranking
- ITF = ITF entry
- JE = Junior exempt
- w/o = Walkover
- r = Retired
- d = Defaulted
- SR = Special ranking

=== Finals ===
Semifinals
(Romania) Irina Bara	6	6
(Turkey) Çağla Büyükakçay	4	3
Q	(Romania) Nicoleta Dascălu	6	6
2	(Romania) Irina-Camelia Begu	4	0

Final
(Romania) Irina Bara	5	2
Q	(Romania) Nicoleta Dascălu	7	6

=== Top half ===
First round
1	(Montenegro) D Kovinić	6	6
(Hungary) F Stollár	3	1
WC	(Hungary) A Nagy	4	4
Q	(Slovenia) N Potočnik	6	6
(Romania) I Bara	6	6
(Poland) M Chwalińska	4	4
Q	(Romania) IG Ghioroaie	6^{5}	4
5	(Bulgaria) V Tomova	7^{7}	6
3	(Ukraine) K Zavatska	2	2
(Turkey) Ç Büyükakçay	6	6
Q	(Belgium) M Zanevska	7^{7}	6
Q	(Croatia) L Bošković	6^{1}	3
Q	(Chile) D Seguel	6	0	4
WC	(Hungary) D Drahota-Szabó	4	6	6
(Brazil) G Cé	1	0
6	(Paraguay) V Cepede Royg	6	6

Second round
1	(Montenegro) D Kovinić	6	6
Q	(Slovenia) N Potočnik	2	3
(Romania) I Bara	7	2	6
5	(Bulgaria) V Tomova	5	6	3
(Turkey) Ç Büyükakçay	5	6	7
Q	(Belgium) M Zanevska	7	2	5
WC	(Hungary) D Drahota-Szabó	6	3	2
6	(Paraguay) V Cepede Royg	4	6	6

Quarterfinals
1	(Montenegro) D Kovinić	3	3
(Romania) I Bara	6	6
(Turkey) Ç Büyükakçay	5	6	6
6	(Paraguay) V Cepede Royg	7	1	3

Semifinals
(Romania) I Bara	6	6
(Turkey) Ç Büyükakçay	4	3

=== Bottom half ===
First round
7	(Slovakia) K Kučová	1	2
Q	(Romania) N Dascălu	6	6
(Hungary) A Bondár	3	4
Q	(Spain) G García Pérez	6	6
Q	(Switzerland) S Waltert	6	6
(Italy) M Di Giuseppe	4	0
WC	(Hungary) G Arn	7^{7}	2	1
4	(Poland) K Kawa	6^{5}	6	6
8	(Slovakia) R Šramková	7^{7}	3	6
(Hungary) RL Jani	6^{5}	6	3
PR	(Sweden) S Celik	2	1
WC	(Hungary) D Gálfi	6	6
(Argentina) P Ormaechea	7	7
(France) H Tan	5	5
(Poland) M Fręch	1	1
2	(Romania) I-C Begu	6	6

Second round
Q	(Romania) N Dascălu	7^{8}	7^{7}
Q	(Spain) G García Pérez	6^{6}	6^{2}
Q	(Switzerland) S Waltert	6^{5}	3
4	(Poland) K Kawa	7^{7}	6
8	(Slovakia) R Šramková	6	6
WC	(Hungary) D Gálfi	4	3
(Argentina) P Ormaechea	2	4
2	(Romania) I-C Begu	6	6

Quarterfinals
Q	(Romania) N Dascălu	6	6
4	(Poland) K Kawa	3	3
8	(Slovakia) R Šramková	1	3
2	(Romania) I-C Begu	6	6

Semifinals
Q	(Romania) N Dascălu	6	6
2	(Romania) I-C Begu	4	0
