= 2019 Kiskút Open II – Doubles =

Doubles
- 2019 Kiskút Open II

Final
- Champions: (Spain) Georgina García Pérez (Hungary) Fanny Stollár
- Runners-up: (Slovenia) Nina Potočnik (Slovenia) Nika Radišič
- Score: 6–1, 7–6^{(7–4)}

Events
Singles	Doubles
Kiskút Open	· 2020 →

This was the first edition of the tournament.

Georgina García Pérez and Fanny Stollár won the title, defeating Nina Potočnik and Nika Radišič in the final, 6–1, 7–6^{(7–4)}.

== Seeds ==
1. (Japan) Makoto Ninomiya / (Czech Republic) Renata Voráčová (quarterfinals)
2. (Spain) Georgina García Pérez / (Hungary) Fanny Stollár (champions)
3. (Romania) Irina Bara / (Hungary) Réka Luca Jani (quarterfinals, withdrew)
4. (Italy) Giorgia Marchetti / (Bulgaria) Isabella Shinikova (first round)

== Draw ==
=== Key ===
- Q = Qualifier
- WC = Wild card
- LL = Lucky loser
- Alt = Alternate
- SE = Special exempt
- PR = Protected ranking
- ITF = ITF entry
- JE = Junior exempt
- w/o = Walkover
- r = Retired
- d = Defaulted
- SR = Special ranking

=== Draw ===
First round
1	(Japan) M Ninomiya (Czech Republic) R Voráčová	6	4	[10]
(Romania) M Bulgaru (Romania) I Fetecău	4	6	[6]
(Hungary) A Bondár (Hungary) D Gálfi	6	7
(Russia) A Fomina (Slovakia) V Juhászová	1	5
3	(Romania) I Bara (Hungary) RL Jani	6	6
(Uzbekistan) A Amanmuradova (Romania) E Bogdan	2	3
(Poland) M Chwalińska (Italy) E Cocciaretto	4	4
(Slovenia) N Potočnik (Slovenia) N Radišič	6	6
(Belgium) M Benoît (Romania) A Cadanțu	3	7^{7}	[6]
(Russia) A Anshba (Czech Republic) A Dețiuc	6	6^{4}	[10]
(Ukraine) M Chernyshova (Slovakia) C Škamlová	6	6
4	(Italy) G Marchetti (Bulgaria) I Shinikova	2	1
WC	(Hungary) B Békefi (Hungary) D Drahota-Szabó	2	1
(Austria) B Haas (Slovakia) R Šramková	6	6
WC	(Hungary) G Arn (Hungary) A Nagy	3	2
2	(Spain) G García Pérez (Hungary) F Stollár	6	6

Quarterfinals
1	(Japan) M Ninomiya (Czech Republic) R Voráčová	6	4	[3]
(Hungary) A Bondár (Hungary) D Gálfi	4	6	[10]
3	(Romania) I Bara (Hungary) RL Jani
(Slovenia) N Potočnik (Slovenia) N Radišič	w/o
(Russia) A Anshba (Czech Republic) A Dețiuc	7	6^{6}	[5]
(Ukraine) M Chernyshova (Slovakia) C Škamlová	5	7^{8}	[10]
(Austria) B Haas (Slovakia) R Šramková
2	(Spain) G García Pérez (Hungary) F Stollár	w/o

Semifinals
(Hungary) A Bondár (Hungary) D Gálfi	4	3
(Slovenia) N Potočnik (Slovenia) N Radišič	6	6
(Ukraine) M Chernyshova (Slovakia) C Škamlová	2	1
2	(Spain) G García Pérez (Hungary) F Stollár	6	6

Final
(Slovenia) N Potočnik (Slovenia) N Radišič	1	6^{4}
2	(Spain) G García Pérez (Hungary) F Stollár	6	7^{7}
