= Kiskút Open =

Tournament information
- Event name: Kiskút Open
- Location: Székesfehérvár, Hungary
- Venue: Kiskút Tenisz Klub
- Category: ITF Women's Circuit / ATP Challenger Tour (2023-)
- Surface: Clay indoor
- Draw: 32S/32Q/16D
- Prize money: $100,000 / $60,000 / $15,000
- Website: www.hungarianprocircuit.com

The Kiskút Open, known as the Székesfehérvár Open are a series of back-to-back tournaments for female tennis players played on indoor clay courts. The events are classified as $100k, $60k and $15k ITF Women's Circuit tournaments and have been held in Székesfehérvár, Hungary, since 2017.

Starting in 2023, a men's tournament was held as part of the ATP Challenger Tour until 2024.

== Past finals ==
=== Women's singles ===
Year	Champion	Runner-up	Score
2025	(Austria) Sinja Kraus	(Hungary) Amarissa Tóth	2–6, 7–5, 6–3
2020–24	Not held		
2019 (2)	(Montenegro) Danka Kovinić	(Romania) Irina-Camelia Begu	6–4, 3–6, 6–3
2019 (1)	(Romania) Nicoleta Dascălu	(Romania) Irina Bara	7–5, 6–2
2018	(Romania) Ioana Gașpar	(Hungary) Vanda Lukács	7–5, 6–3
2017	(Hungary) Panna Udvardy	(Hungary) Réka Luca Jani	7–5, 6–3

=== Women's doubles ===
Year	Champions	Runners-up	Score
2025	(Romania) Irina Bara (Georgia (country)) Ekaterine Gorgodze	(Hungary) Luca Udvardy (Hungary) Panna Udvardy	6–7^{(7–9)}, 6–3, [10–3]
2020–24	Not held		
2019 (2)	(Spain) Georgina García Pérez (Hungary) Fanny Stollár	(Slovenia) Nina Potočnik (Slovenia) Nika Radišič	6–1, 7–6^{(7–4)}
2019 (1)	(Romania) Irina Bara (Belgium) Maryna Zanevska	(Uzbekistan) Akgul Amanmuradova (Romania) Elena Bogdan	3–6, 6–2, [10–8]
2018	(Russia) Victoria Kan (Slovakia) Ingrid Vojčináková	(Serbia) Tamara Čurović (Slovakia) Draginja Vuković	7–5, 6–3
2017	(Romania) Laura Ioana Paar (Romania) Elena Bogdan	(Hungary) Panna Udvardy (Hungary) Réka Luca Jani	1–6, 6–2, [10–7]

=== Men's singles ===
Year	Champion	Runner-up	Score
2024	(Chinese Taipei) Tseng Chun-hsin	(France) Titouan Droguet	4–1 ret.
2023	(Serbia) Hamad Međedović	(Croatia) Nino Serdarušić	6–4, 6–3

=== Men's doubles ===
Year	Champions	Runners-up	Score
2024	(France) Titouan Droguet (France) Matteo Martineau	(Sweden) André Göransson (Ukraine) Denys Molchanov	4–6, 7–5, [10–8]
2023	Bogdan Bobrov (Uzbekistan) Sergey Fomin	(Turkey) Sarp Ağabigün (Turkey) Ergi Kırkın	6–2, 5–7, [11–9]
