= Sergey Fomin (tennis) =

Uzbekistani tennis player (born 2001)

- Country (sports): Uzbekistan
- Born: 1 February 2001 (age 25) Tashkent, Uzbekistan
- Height: 1.83 m (6 ft 0 in)
- Plays: Right-handed (two-handed backhand)
- Coach: Denis Istomin
- Prize money: US $178,210

Singles
- Career record: 2–8 (at ATP Tour level, Grand Slam level, and in Davis Cup)
- Career titles: 2 Challenger, 7 ITF
- Highest ranking: No. 287 (14 September 2026)
- Current ranking: No. 333 (9 November 2026)

Doubles
- Career record: 2–4 (at ATP Tour level, Grand Slam level, and in Davis Cup)
- Career titles: 1 Challenger, 11 ITF
- Highest ranking: No. 313 (17 July 2023)
- Current ranking: No. 683 (9 November 2026)
Medal record
Men's Tennis
Representing Uzbekistan
World University Games
Bronze medal – third place	2021 Chengdu	Singles
- Last updated on: 9 November 2026.

Sergey Fomin (born 1 February 2001) is an Uzbek tennis player. Fomin has a career high ATP singles ranking of world No. 287 achieved on 14 September 2026 and a career high ATP doubles ranking of No. 313 achieved on 17 July 2023. Fomin is currently the No. 1 Uzbek player.

Fomin represents Uzbekistan at the Davis Cup, making his first appearance in a tie against Turkey in March 2022.

== Career ==
He won his first ATP Challenger title at the 2022 Shymkent Challenger II, defeating Robin Haase in the final.

Four years later, Fomin claimed his second title at this level by overcoming Timofey Skatov in the final at the 2026 Shymkent Challenger I and defended his 2022 title. As a result he reached the top 300 in the ATP singles rankings on 4 May 2026.

== ATP Challenger Tour finals ==
=== Singles: 2 (2 titles) ===
Finals by surface
Clay (2–0)

Result	W–L	Date	Tournament	Surface	Opponent	Score
Win	1–0	May 2022	Shymkent, Kazakhstan	Clay	(Netherlands) Robin Haase	7–6^{(7–4)}, 6–3
Win	2–0	Apr 2026	Shymkent, Kazakhstan (2)	Clay	(Kazakhstan) Timofey Skatov	6–3, 7–5

=== Doubles: (1 title, 2 runner-ups) ===
Finals by surface
Hard (0–1)
Clay (1–1)

Result	W–L	Date	Tournament	Surface	Partner	Opponent	Score
Loss	0–1	May 2019	Samarkand, Uzbekistan	Clay	(Russia) Teymuraz Gabashvili	(Portugal) Gonçalo Oliveira (Belarus) Andrei Vasilevski	6–3, 3–6, [4–10]
Loss	0–2	Oct 2022	Alicante, Spain	Hard	(Uzbekistan) Sanjar Fayziev	(Netherlands) Robin Haase (France) Albano Olivetti	6–7^{(5–7)}, 5–7
Win	1–2	Mar 2023	Székesfehérvár, Hungary	Clay (i)	Bogdan Bobrov	(Turkey) Sarp Ağabigün (Turkey) Ergi Kırkın	6–2, 5–7, [11–9]

== ITF World Tennis Tour finals ==
=== Singles: 11 (7 titles, 4 runner-ups) ===
Finals by surface
Hard (4–1)
Clay (3–3)

Result	W–L	Date	Tournament	Surface	Opponent	Score
Win	1–0	Sep 2019	M15 Shymkent, Kazakhstan	Clay	(Russia) Alexey Zakharov	2–6, 6–2, 6–4
Win	2–0	Jan 2020	M15 Kazan, Russia	Hard (i)	(Russia) Evgenii Tiurnev	6–4, 3–6, 6–3
Win	3–0	Jul 2022	M25 Nur-Sultan, Kazakhstan	Hard	(Kazakhstan) Beibit Zhukayev	6–4, 2–6, 6–4
Loss	3–1	Dec 2023	M15 Antalya, Turkey	Clay	(Kazakhstan) Dmitry Popko	4–6, 6–3, 2–6
Win	4–1	Apr 2024	M15 Shymkent, Kazakhstan	Clay	Bekhan Atlangeriev	7–6^{(7–4)}, 6–2
Loss	4–2	Jul 2024	M15 Ust-Kamenogorsk, Kazakhstan	Hard	Martin Borisiouk	2–6, 1–6
Win	5–2	Mar 2025	M15 Antalya, Turkey	Clay	(Romania) Gabriel Ghețu	6–7^{(8–10)}, 6–4, 6–1
Loss	5–3	Mar 2025	M25 Antalya, Turkey	Clay	(Ukraine) Oleksii Krutykh	6–7^{(4–7)}, 6–3, 5–7
Loss	5–4	Apr 2025	M15 Shymkent, Kazakhstan	Clay	(France) Sean Cuenin	4–6, 6–1, 1–6
Win	6–4	Oct 2025	M25 Qiandaohu, China	Hard	Mikalai Haliak	6–2, 6–1
Win	7–4	Oct 2025	M25 Manama, Bahrain	Hard	(Poland) Olaf Pieczkowski	1–6, 6–4, 6–3

=== Doubles: (11 titles, 12 runner-ups) ===
Finals by surface
Hard (4–6)
Clay (7–6)

Result	W–L	Date	Tournament	Surface	Partner	Opponent	Score
Loss	0–1	Jul 2019	M25 Nonthaburi, Thailand	Hard	(Uzbekistan) Sanjar Fayziev	(Chinese Taipei) Hsu Yu-hsiou (Japan) Yuta Shimizu	3–6, 3–6
Loss	0–2	Aug 2019	M15 Moscow, Russia	Clay	(Greece) Markos Kalovelonis	(Russia) Alen Avidzba (Russia) Ivan Davydov	6–3, 1–6, [7–10]
Loss	0–3	Aug 2019	M25 Irpin, Ukraine	Clay	(Uzbekistan) Jurabek Karimov	(Ukraine) Vladyslav Manafov (Kazakhstan) Denis Yevseyev	6–7^{(5–7)}, 7–5, [6–10]
Loss	0–4	Jan 2020	M15 Kazan, Russia	Hard (i)	(Uzbekistan) Jurabek Karimov	(Russia) Alexander Igoshin (Russia) Evgenii Tiurnev	6–7^{(6–8)}, 4–6
Win	1–4	Nov 2020	M15 Antalya, Turkey	Clay	(Uzbekistan) Sanjar Fayziev	(Turkey) Umut Akkoyun (Turkey) Mert Naci Türker	7–6^{(7–4)}, 3–6, [10–7]
Win	2–4	Dec 2020	M15 Antalya, Turkey	Clay	(Uzbekistan) Sanjar Fayziev	(Turkey) Cengiz Aksu (Turkey) Yankı Erel	6–3, 6–4
Loss	2–5	Feb 2022	M25 Sharm El Sheikh, Egypt	Hard	(Uzbekistan) Sanjar Fayziev	(Czech Republic) Marek Gengel (Czech Republic) Lukáš Rosol	4–6, 3–6
Loss	2–6	Mar 2022	M15 Sharm El Sheikh, Egypt	Hard	(South Korea) Park Ui-sung	(Czech Republic) Jiří Barnat (Czech Republic) Filip Duda	3–6, 2–6
Win	3–6	Apr 2022	M15 Shymkent, Kazakhstan	Clay	(Ukraine) Eric Vanshelboim	Erik Arutiunian (Georgia (country)) Saba Purtseladze	6–3, 6–4
Win	4–6	Apr 2023	M25 Sharm El Sheikh, Egypt	Hard	Alibek Kachmazov	(Moldova) Alexander Cozbinov (Denmark) August Holmgren	6–2, 6–3
Win	5–6	May 2023	M25 Bodrum, Turkey	Clay	Evgeny Philippov	Egor Agafonov (France) Lilian Marmousez	6–4, 7–6^{(7–5)}
Win	6–6	Oct 2023	M15 Sharm El Sheikh, Egypt	Hard	(Georgia (country)) Saba Purtseladze	(United Kingdom) Adam Jones (United Kingdom) Henry Searle	6–3, 6–4
Loss	6–7	Apr 2024	M15 Antalya, Turkey	Clay	Pavel Verbin	(Germany) John Sperle (Germany) Marlon Vankan	6–7^{(5–7)}, 1–6
Loss	6–8	Feb 2025	M25 Vila Real de Santo António, Portugal	Hard	Ivan Gakhov	(Serbia) Stefan Latinović (Croatia) Mili Poljičak	4–6, 6–4, [6–10]
Loss	6–9	Mar 2025	M15 Antalya, Turkey	Clay	(Germany) John Sperle	(Morocco) Younes Lalami Laaroussi (Ukraine) Nikita Mashtakov	6–7^{(2–7)}, 5–7
Win	7–9	Mar 2025	M15 Antalya, Turkey	Clay	Daniil Golubev	(Belgium) Emilien Demanet (Belgium) Jack Logé	4–6, 7–6^{(7–5)}, [10–6]
Loss	7–10	Mar 2025	M25 Antalya, Turkey	Clay	Pavel Verbin	(Turkey) Gökberk Sarıtaş (Turkey) Mert Naci Türker	6–7^{(4–7)}, 6–2, [8–10]
Win	8–10	Apr 2025	M15 Shymkent, Kazakhstan	Clay	Pavel Verbin	(Germany) Adrian Oetzbach (Belgium) Martin van der Meerschen	6–3, 6–3
Loss	8–11	Apr 2025	M15 Shymkent, Kazakhstan	Clay	Pavel Verbin	(Austria) Gregor Ramskogler (Germany) Kai Wehnelt	7–5, 4–6, [3–10]
Win	9–11	May 2025	M15 Tashkent, Uzbekistan	Clay	(Ukraine) Vladyslav Orlov	(India) Ishaque Eqbal (India) Nitin Kumar Sinha	6–2, 6–4
Win	10–11	Oct 2025	M25 Qiandaohu, China	Hard	(Spain) Ignasi Forcano	(China) Fnu Nidunjianzan (China) Sun Fajing	6–2, 6–4
Loss	10–12	Nov 2025	M15 Manama, Bahrain	Hard	Daniil Golubev	(Spain) Iván Marrero Curbelo (Latvia) Kārlis Ozoliņš	7–6^{(12–10)}, 2–6, [8–10]
Win	11–12	Mar 2026	M15 Ma'anshan, China	Hard	(Uzbekistan) Maxim Shin	(China) Chen Xianfeng (China) Wang Aoran	5–7, 6–4, [10–5]
