= Bogdan Bobrov =

Russian tennis player

- Country (sports): Russia
- Born: 16 September 1997 (age 28) Penza, Russia
- Height: 1.85 m (6 ft 1 in)
- Plays: Right-handed (one-handed backhand)
- Prize money: $146,945

Singles
- Career record: 0–0
- Career titles: 0
- Highest ranking: No. 361 (11 December 2023)
- Current ranking: No. 383 (13 October 2024)

Doubles
- Career record: 0–0
- Career titles: 0
- Highest ranking: No. 329 (12 June 2023)
- Current ranking: No. 418 (13 October 2024)
- Last updated on: 13 October 2024.

Bogdan Bobrov (born 16 September 1997) is a Russian tennis player.

Bobrov has a career-high ATP singles ranking of 361 achieved on 11 December 2023. He also has a career-high doubles ranking of 329 achieved on 12 June 2023.

Bobrov has won 1 ATP Challenger doubles title at the 2023 Kiskút Open with Sergey Fomin.

== Challenger and World Tennis Tour Finals ==
=== Singles: 17 (8–9) ===
Legend ATP Challenger Tour (0–0) ITF World Tennis Tour (8–9)	Finals by surface Hard (5–8) Clay (3–1) Grass (0–0)

Result	W–L	Date	Tournament	Tier	Surface	Opponent	Score
Loss	0–1	Jul 2019	M15 Pärnu, Estonia	World Tour	Clay	(Estonia) Jürgen Zopp	4–6, 3–6
Win	1–1	Sep 2019	M15 Tabarka, Tunisia	World Tour	Clay	(France) Thomas Laurent	6–4, 6–4
Win	2–1	Oct 2019	M15 Tabarka, Tunisia	World Tour	Clay	(Argentina) Fermin Tenti	3–6, 6–3, 6–2
Loss	2–2	Oct 2019	M15 Doha, Qatar	World Tour	Hard	(Germany) Tobias Simon	3–6, 5–7
Loss	2–3	Nov 2019	M15 Heraklion, Greece	World Tour	Hard	(Netherlands) Mick Veldheer	6–7^{(3–7)}, 6–7^{(4–7)}
Win	3–3	Sep 2020	M15 Novomoskovsk, Russia	World Tour	Clay	(Ukraine) Oleksii Krutykh	6–3, 6–3
Loss	3–4	Nov 2020	M15 Bratislava, Slovakia	World Tour	Hard (i)	(Belgium) Zizou Bergs	4–6, 2–6
Win	4–4	Oct 2021	M15 Kazan, Russia	World Tour	Hard (i)	(Russia) Alibek Kachmazov	7–5, 6–4
Loss	4–5	Oct 2021	M25 Nur-Sultan, Kazakhstan	World Tour	Hard (i)	(Russia) Alibek Kachmazov	2–6, 6–4, 4–6
Win	5–5	Jan 2023	M15 Monastir, Tunisia	World Tour	Hard	(Monaco) Lucas Catarina	6–4, 7–5
Loss	5–6	Jan 2023	M15 Monastir, Tunisia	World Tour	Hard	(Netherlands) Guy den Ouden	5–7, 2–6
Loss	5–7	Jan 2023	M25 Doha, Qatar	World Tour	Hard	(Morocco) Elliot Benchetrit	4–6, 3–6
Loss	5–8	Apr 2023	M15 Monastir, Tunisia	World Tour	Hard	(United States) Omni Kumar	6–7^{(4–7)}, 6–2, 1–6
Win	6–8	Oct 2023	M15 Davangere, India	World Tour	Hard	(United States) Nick Chappell	6–3, 7–6^{(7–4)}
Win	7–8	Dec 2023	M25 Monastir, Tunisia	World Tour	Hard	(France) Alexis Gautier	2–6, 6–4, 7–5
Win	8–8	Jan 2024	M25 Bhopal, India	World Tour	Hard	(United Kingdom) Oliver Crawford	W/O
Loss	8–9	Nov 2024	M25 Kalaburagi, India	World Tour	Hard	(Uzbekistan) Khumoyun Sultanov	2–6, 1–6
