= 2017 Almaty Challenger – Doubles =

Doubles
- 2017 Almaty Challenger

Final
- Champions: (Kazakhstan) Timur Khabibulin (Kazakhstan) Aleksandr Nedovyesov
- Runners-up: (Russia) Ivan Gakhov (Croatia) Nino Serdarušić
- Score: 1–6, 6–3, [10–3]

Events
Singles	Doubles
Almaty Challenger	· 2018 →

This was the first edition of the tournament.

Timur Khabibulin and Aleksandr Nedovyesov won the title after defeating Ivan Gakhov and Nino Serdarušić 1–6, 6–3, [10–3] in the final.

== Seeds ==
1. (Czech Republic) Zdeněk Kolář / (Ukraine) Denys Molchanov (first round)
2. (Belarus) Aliaksandr Bury / (Switzerland) Luca Margaroli (first round)
3. (Ukraine) Vladyslav Manafov / (Russia) Alexander Pavlioutchenkov (first round)
4. (Russia) Ivan Gakhov / (Croatia) Nino Serdarušić (final)

== Draw ==
=== Key ===
- Q = Qualifier
- WC = Wild card
- LL = Lucky loser
- Alt = Alternate
- SE = Special exempt
- PR = Protected ranking
- ITF = ITF entry
- JE = Junior exempt
- w/o = Walkover
- r = Retired
- d = Defaulted
- SR = Special ranking

First round
1	(Czech Republic) Z Kolář (Ukraine) D Molchanov	6	4	[8]
(Russia) M Elgin (Belarus) U Ignatik	2	6	[10]
WC	(Kazakhstan) Sagadat Ayap (Kazakhstan) Timur Maulenov	3	1
(Bulgaria) A Lazov (Ukraine) V Uzhylovskyi	6	6
4	(Russia) I Gakhov (Croatia) N Serdarušić	2	6	[13]
(Belgium) K Coppejans (Belgium) Clément Geens	6	4	[11]
(Spain) E López-Pérez (Argentina) M Trungelliti	6	6
WC	(Kazakhstan) G Lomakin (Kazakhstan) Sultan Narbekov	0	1
(Hungary) G Borsos (Egypt) M Safwat	2	1
(Kazakhstan) T Khabibulin (Kazakhstan) A Nedovyesov	6	6
(Monaco) R Arneodo (Belgium) A De Greef	6	6
3	(Ukraine) V Manafov (Russia) A Pavlioutchenkov	4	2
(Uzbekistan) S Fayziev (Russia) I Nedelko	1	5
(Belarus) S Betov (Kazakhstan) D Popko	6	7
Alt	(Bosnia and Herzegovina) T Brkić (Serbia) Milan Radojković	2	6	[10]
2	(Belarus) A Bury (Switzerland) L Margaroli	6	3	[2]

Quarterfinals
(Russia) M Elgin (Belarus) U Ignatik	5	6^{4}
(Bulgaria) A Lazov (Ukraine) V Uzhylovskyi	7	7^{7}
4	(Russia) I Gakhov (Croatia) N Serdarušić	6	3	[10]
(Spain) E López-Pérez (Argentina) M Trungelliti	4	6	[2]
(Kazakhstan) T Khabibulin (Kazakhstan) A Nedovyesov	6	7^{7}
(Monaco) R Arneodo (Belgium) A De Greef	3	6^{5}
(Belarus) S Betov (Kazakhstan) D Popko	6	6
Alt	(Bosnia and Herzegovina) T Brkić (Serbia) M Radojković	4	3

Semifinals
(Bulgaria) A Lazov (Ukraine) V Uzhylovskyi	4	2
4	(Russia) I Gakhov (Croatia) N Serdarušić	6	6
(Kazakhstan) T Khabibulin (Kazakhstan) A Nedovyesov	6	6
(Belarus) S Betov (Kazakhstan) D Popko	4	3

Final
4	(Russia) I Gakhov (Croatia) N Serdarušić	6	3	[3]
(Kazakhstan) T Khabibulin (Kazakhstan) A Nedovyesov	1	6	[10]
