= 2019 Almaty Challenger – Singles =

Singles
- 2019 Almaty Challenger

Final
- Champion: (Italy) Lorenzo Giustino
- Runner-up: (Argentina) Federico Coria
- Score: 6–4, 6–4

Events
Singles	Doubles
- Almaty Challenger

Denis Istomin was the defending champion but lost in the third round to Federico Coria.

Lorenzo Giustino won the title after defeating Coria 6–4, 6–4 in the final.

== Seeds ==
All seeds receive a bye into the second round.

1. (Tunisia) Malek Jaziri (second round)
2. (Uzbekistan) Denis Istomin (third round)
3. (Serbia) Nikola Milojević (quarterfinals)
4. (Slovakia) Andrej Martin (quarterfinals)
5. (Italy) Lorenzo Giustino (champion)
6. (Germany) Yannick Hanfmann (semifinals)
7. (Australia) Marc Polmans (second round)
8. (Kazakhstan) Aleksandr Nedovyesov (quarterfinals)
9. (Serbia) Peđa Krstin (second round)
10. (Colombia) Santiago Giraldo (third round)
11. (Russia) Evgeny Karlovskiy (third round)
12. (Australia) Akira Santillan (second round)
13. (Argentina) Federico Coria (final)
14. (Canada) Steven Diez (second round)
15. (Portugal) Gonçalo Oliveira (third round)
16. (Spain) Daniel Gimeno Traver (third round)

== Draw ==
Key

- Q = Qualifier
- WC = Wild card
- LL = Lucky loser
- Alt = Alternate
- ITF = ITF entry
- PR = Protected ranking
- SR = Special ranking
- SE = Special exempt
- JE = Junior exempt
- JR = Junior Accelerator Programme entrant
- CO = College Accelerator Programme entrant
- NG = Next Gen Accelerator Program entrant
- w/o = Walkover
- r = Retired
- d = Defaulted

=== Finals ===
Quarterfinals
ITF	(Chile) Alejandro Tabilo	3	6	3
5	(Italy) Lorenzo Giustino	6	1	6
3	(Serbia) Nikola Milojević	4	3
(Spain) Mario Vilella Martínez	6	6
6	(Germany) Yannick Hanfmann	6	4	7
4	(Slovakia) Andrej Martin	2	6	5
8	(Kazakhstan) Aleksandr Nedovyesov	6^{4}	4
13	(Argentina) Federico Coria	7^{7}	6

Semifinals
5	(Italy) Lorenzo Giustino	7	4	6
(Spain) Mario Vilella Martínez	5	6	2
6	(Germany) Yannick Hanfmann	5	4
13	(Argentina) Federico Coria	7	6

Final
5	(Italy) Lorenzo Giustino	6	6
13	(Argentina) Federico Coria	4	4

=== Top half ===
==== Section 1 ====
First round
(Spain) N Kuhn	6	2	6
WC	(Kazakhstan) A Golubev	3	6	2
ITF	(Chile) A Tabilo	6	6
(Bosnia and Herzegovina) T Brkić	1	3
(Chinese Taipei) T-l Wu	6	6
(France) G Sakharov	3	4
(Croatia) N Serdarušić	6	6
ITF	(Italy) R Bonadio	3	4

Second round
1	(Tunisia) M Jaziri	6^{6}	6^{2}
(Spain) N Kuhn	7^{8}	7^{7}
ITF	(Chile) A Tabilo	6	6
14	(Canada) S Diez	3	1
10	(Colombia) S Giraldo	2	6	6
(Chinese Taipei) T-l Wu	6	3	2
(Croatia) N Serdarušić	6	3	2
5	(Italy) L Giustino	3	6	6

Third round
(Spain) N Kuhn	0	6^{0}
ITF	(Chile) A Tabilo	6	7^{7}
10	(Colombia) S Giraldo	1	3
5	(Italy) L Giustino	6	6

Quarterfinals
ITF	(Chile) A Tabilo	3	6	3
5	(Italy) L Giustino	6	1	6

==== Section 2 ====
First round
(United States) E King	6	5	6
(France) A Müller	4	7	2
(Chile) MT Barrios Vera	6	6
ITF	(Russia) K Kravchuk	4	2
(Kazakhstan) D Yevseyev	3	6	4
(Switzerland) M-A Hüsler	6	4	6
(Spain) M Vilella Martínez	6	6
(Ecuador) G Escobar	0	4

Second round
3	(Serbia) N Milojević	6	7
(United States) E King	2	5
(Chile) MT Barrios Vera	6^{7}	1
16	(Spain) D Gimeno Traver	7^{9}	6
12	(Australia) A Santillan	6	3	6^{5}
(Switzerland) M-A Hüsler	3	6	7^{7}
(Spain) M Vilella Martínez	6	7^{8}
7	(Australia) M Polmans	2	6^{6}

Third round
3	(Serbia) N Milojević	6	3	6
16	(Spain) D Gimeno Traver	1	6	3
(Switzerland) M-A Hüsler	4	1
(Spain) M Vilella Martínez	6	6

Quarterfinals
3	(Serbia) N Milojević	4	3
(Spain) M Vilella Martínez	6	6

=== Bottom half ===
==== Section 3 ====
First round
(Russia) R Safiullin	6	2	6
(Australia) M Purcell	3	6	0
WC	(United States) S Korda	6	6^{0}	0
(Russia) P Kotov	4	7^{7}	6
Q	(Ukraine) V Manafov	7^{7}	7^{7}
WC	(Uzbekistan) K Sultanov	6^{2}	6^{3}
(Australia) A Vukic	4	6	3
Alt	(China) D Wu	6	2	6

Second round
6	(Germany) Y Hanfmann	7	6
(Russia) R Safiullin	5	3
(Russia) P Kotov	6	6
9	(Serbia) P Krstin	3	4
15	(Portugal) G Oliveira	6	7
Q	(Ukraine) V Manafov	4	5
Alt	(China) D Wu	0	4
4	(Slovakia) A Martin	6	6

Third round
6	(Germany) Y Hanfmann	6	6
(Russia) P Kotov	2	4
15	(Portugal) G Oliveira	2	1
4	(Slovakia) A Martin	6	6

Quarterfinals
6	(Germany) Y Hanfmann	6	4	7
4	(Slovakia) A Martin	2	6	5

==== Section 4 ====
First round
(Argentina) A Collarini	6	6
WC	(Kazakhstan) T Skatov	3	2
ITF	(Tunisia) S Mansouri	3	4
(Croatia) A Pavić	6	6
Q	(Russia) I Gakhov	7	6
(Dominican Republic) R Cid Subervi	5	1
WC	(Bulgaria) A Lazarov	5	5
ITF	(Russia) A Zhurbin	7	7

Second round
8	(Kazakhstan) A Nedovyesov	6	6
(Argentina) A Collarini	3	1
(Croatia) A Pavić	3	6^{4}
11	(Russia) E Karlovskiy	6	7^{7}
13	(Argentina) F Coria	6	5	6
Q	(Russia) I Gakhov	4	7	4
ITF	(Russia) A Zhurbin	1	4
2	(Uzbekistan) D Istomin	6	6

Third round
8	(Kazakhstan) A Nedovyesov	6	6
11	(Russia) E Karlovskiy	2	3
13	(Argentina) F Coria	6	7
2	(Uzbekistan) D Istomin	2	5

Quarterfinals
8	(Kazakhstan) A Nedovyesov	6^{4}	4
13	(Argentina) F Coria	7^{7}	6
