= 2021 Almaty Challenger – Doubles =

Doubles
- 2021 Almaty Challenger

Final
- Champions: (Netherlands) Jesper de Jong (Ukraine) Vitaliy Sachko
- Runners-up: (Ukraine) Vladyslav Manafov (Russia) Evgenii Tiurnev
- Score: 7–6^{(7–4)}, 6–1

Events
Singles	Doubles
← 2019 ·	Almaty Challenger	· 2021 →

Andrej Martin and Hans Podlipnik Castillo were the defending champions but chose not to defend their title.

Jesper de Jong and Vitaliy Sachko won the title after defeating Vladyslav Manafov and Evgenii Tiurnev 7–6^{(7–4)}, 6–1 in the final.

== Seeds ==
1. (Brazil) Felipe Meligeni Alves / (Brazil) João Menezes (first round)
2. (Canada) Brayden Schnur / (Chinese Taipei) Yang Tsung-hua (first round)
3. (Netherlands) Jesper de Jong / (Ukraine) Vitaliy Sachko (champions)
4. (Uzbekistan) Denis Istomin / (Kazakhstan) Denis Yevseyev (first round)

== Draw ==
=== Key ===
- Q = Qualifier
- WC = Wild card
- LL = Lucky loser
- Alt = Alternate
- SE = Special exempt
- PR = Protected ranking
- ITF = ITF entry
- JE = Junior exempt
- w/o = Walkover
- r = Retired
- d = Defaulted
- SR = Special ranking

First round
1	(Brazil) F Meligeni Alves (Brazil) J Menezes	3	0
(Bosnia and Herzegovina) M Bašić (Croatia) N Serdarušić	6	6
(Belgium) Z Bergs (Belgium) K Coppejans	6	6
WC	(Kazakhstan) Dostanbek Tashbulatov (Kazakhstan) B Zhukayev	3	2
4	(Uzbekistan) D Istomin (Kazakhstan) D Yevseyev	3	2
(Ukraine) V Manafov (Russia) E Tiurnev	6	6
WC	(Russia) Yan Bondarevskiy (Kazakhstan) G Lomakin	6	6^{5}	[10]
(Bulgaria) D Kuzmanov (Italy) GM Moroni	4	7^{7}	[12]
WC	(Spain) C Gimeno Valero (Kazakhstan) T Skatov	7	2	[6]
(Spain) A Menéndez Maceiras (Spain) R Ortega Olmedo	5	6	[10]
(Russia) T Gabashvili (Italy) L Giustino	3	4
3	(Netherlands) J de Jong (Ukraine) V Sachko	6	6
(Chinese Taipei) C-h Tseng (Chinese Taipei) T-l Wu	4	6	[8]
(Chile) MT Barrios Vera (Italy) R Bonadio	6	2	[10]
(Kazakhstan) D Popko (Egypt) M Safwat	7^{7}	6
2	(Canada) B Schnur (Chinese Taipei) T-h Yang	6^{4}	3

Quarterfinals
(Bosnia and Herzegovina) M Bašić (Croatia) N Serdarušić	6	7^{7}
(Belgium) Z Bergs (Belgium) K Coppejans	3	6^{3}
(Ukraine) V Manafov (Russia) E Tiurnev	7^{7}	6
(Bulgaria) D Kuzmanov (Italy) GM Moroni	6^{3}	2
(Spain) A Menéndez Maceiras (Spain) R Ortega Olmedo	1	2
3	(Netherlands) J de Jong (Ukraine) V Sachko	6	6
(Chile) MT Barrios Vera (Italy) R Bonadio	7^{7}	5	[10]
(Kazakhstan) D Popko (Egypt) M Safwat	6^{4}	7	[8]

Semifinals
(Bosnia and Herzegovina) M Bašić (Croatia) N Serdarušić	6	3	[9]
(Ukraine) V Manafov (Russia) E Tiurnev	4	6	[11]
3	(Netherlands) J de Jong (Ukraine) V Sachko	6	6
(Chile) MT Barrios Vera (Italy) R Bonadio	2	0

Final
(Ukraine) V Manafov (Russia) E Tiurnev	6^{4}	1
3	(Netherlands) J de Jong (Ukraine) V Sachko	7^{7}	6
