= 2018 Almaty Challenger =

- Date: 11–16 June
- Edition: 2nd
- Surface: Clay
- Location: Almaty, Kazakhstan

Champions

Singles
- (Austria) Jurij Rodionov

Doubles
- (Germany) Kevin Krawietz / (Germany) Andreas Mies
← 2017 ·	Almaty Challenger	· 2018 →

The 2018 Almaty Challenger was a professional tennis tournament played on clay courts. It was the second edition of the tournament which was part of the 2018 ATP Challenger Tour. It took place in Almaty, Kazakhstan between 11 and 16 June 2018.

== Singles main-draw entrants ==
=== Seeds ===
Country	Player	Rank^{1}	Seed
FRA	Calvin Hemery	130	1
GER	Yannick Hanfmann	138	2
BOL	Hugo Dellien	145	3
AUT	Sebastian Ofner	147	4
EGY	Mohamed Safwat	182	5
SRB	Nikola Milojević	191	6
CRO	Nino Serdarušić	201	7
BLR	Uladzimir Ignatik	202	8

- ^{1} Rankings are as of 28 May 2018.

=== Other entrants ===
The following players received wildcards into the singles main draw:

- (Russia) Alen Avidzba
- (Kazakhstan) Timur Khabibulin
- (Kazakhstan) Timofei Skatov
- (Kazakhstan) Denis Yevseyev

The following player received entry into the singles main draw as a special exempt:

- (Dominican Republic) Roberto Cid Subervi

The following players received entry from the qualifying draw:

- (Spain) Gerard Granollers
- (Germany) Daniel Masur
- (Austria) Jurij Rodionov
- (New Zealand) Rubin Statham

The following player received entry as a lucky loser:

- (Japan) Yusuke Takahashi

== Champions ==
=== Singles ===
- (Austria) Jurij Rodionov def. (Serbia) Peđa Krstin 7–5, 6–2.

=== Doubles ===
- (Germany) Kevin Krawietz / (Germany) Andreas Mies def. (Lithuania) Laurynas Grigelis / (Ukraine) Vladyslav Manafov 6–2, 7–6^{(7–2)}.
