= 2017 Almaty Challenger – Singles =

Singles
- 2017 Almaty Challenger

Final
- Champion: (Serbia) Filip Krajinović
- Runner-up: (Serbia) Laslo Djere
- Score: 6–0, 6–3

Details
- Draw: 32
- Seeds: 8

Events
Singles	Doubles
Almaty Challenger	· 2018 →

This was the first edition of the tournament.

Filip Krajinović won the title after defeating Laslo Djere 6–0, 6–3 in the final.

== Seeds ==
1. (Serbia) Laslo Djere (final)
2. (Serbia) Filip Krajinović (champion)
3. (Spain) Guillermo García López (quarterfinals)
4. (Slovakia) Martin Kližan (first round)
5. (Belgium) Arthur De Greef (quarterfinals)
6. (Hungary) Attila Balázs (first round)
7. (Belarus) Uladzimir Ignatik (second round)
8. (Czech Republic) Adam Pavlásek (second round)

== Draw ==
=== Key ===
- Q = Qualifier
- WC = Wild card
- LL = Lucky loser
- Alt = Alternate
- SE = Special exempt
- PR = Protected ranking
- ITF = ITF entry
- JE = Junior exempt
- w/o = Walkover
- r = Retired
- d = Defaulted
- SR = Special ranking

=== Finals ===
Semifinals
1	(Serbia) Laslo Djere	6	1	6
(Russia) Ivan Gakhov	4	6	2
(Argentina) Marco Trungelliti	3	4
2	(Serbia) Filip Krajinović	6	6

Final
1	(Serbia) Laslo Djere	0	3
2	(Serbia) Filip Krajinović	6	6

=== Top half ===
First round
1	(Serbia) L Djere	6	7
(Serbia) M Zekić	1	5
WC	(Kazakhstan) R Khassanov	4	2
(Czech Republic) Z Kolář	6	6
Q	(Russia) E Karlovskiy	6	3	4
WC	(Kazakhstan) T Khabibulin	0	6	6
(Bosnia and Herzegovina) T Brkić	4	3
5	(Belgium) A De Greef	6	6
3	(Spain) G García López	6	6
WC	(Kazakhstan) D Yevseyev	2	1
(Belgium) K Coppejans	6	4	4
(Kazakhstan) A Nedovyesov	1	6	6
(Russia) I Gakhov	7	2	6
Q	(Estonia) V Ivanov	5	6	4
Q	(Bulgaria) A Lazov	3	5
8	(Czech Republic) A Pavlásek	6	7

Second round
1	(Serbia) L Djere	6	6
(Czech Republic) Z Kolář	2	0
WC	(Kazakhstan) T Khabibulin	1	3
5	(Belgium) A De Greef	6	6
3	(Spain) G García López	6	6
(Kazakhstan) A Nedovyesov	2	1
(Russia) I Gakhov	6	6
8	(Czech Republic) A Pavlásek	1	2

Quarterfinals
1	(Serbia) L Djere	6	6
5	(Belgium) A De Greef	3	3
3	(Spain) G García López	4	1
(Russia) I Gakhov	6	6

Semifinals
1	(Serbia) L Djere	6	1	6
(Russia) I Gakhov	4	6	2

=== Bottom half ===
First round
7	(Belarus) U Ignatik	5	6	7
(Egypt) M Safwat	7	4	5
(Argentina) M Trungelliti	6	6
(Spain) E López-Pérez	1	4
(Poland) K Majchrzak	6	6
(Croatia) N Serdarušić	2	2
(Russia) I Nedelko	6	5	6
4	(Slovakia) M Kližan	3	7	1
6	(Hungary) A Balázs	3	1
(Kazakhstan) D Popko	6	6
(Italy) F Gaio	6	6
(Czech Republic) V Šafránek	4	2
Q	(Ukraine) D Molchanov	2	1
WC	(Slovakia) A Molčan	6	6
(Uzbekistan) S Fayziev	2	2
2	(Serbia) F Krajinović	6	6

Second round
7	(Belarus) U Ignatik	4	1
(Argentina) M Trungelliti	6	6
(Poland) K Majchrzak	5	6	3
(Russia) I Nedelko	7	1	6
(Kazakhstan) D Popko	3	6	3
(Italy) F Gaio	6	3	6
WC	(Slovakia) A Molčan	4	0
2	(Serbia) F Krajinović	6	6

Quarterfinals
(Argentina) M Trungelliti	6	6
(Russia) I Nedelko	3	4
(Italy) F Gaio	0	0
2	(Serbia) F Krajinović	6	6

Semifinals
(Argentina) M Trungelliti	3	4
2	(Serbia) F Krajinović	6	6
