= 2021 Almaty Challenger II – Singles =

Singles
- 2021 Almaty Challenger II

Final
- Champion: (Netherlands) Jesper de Jong
- Runner-up: (Chile) Marcelo Tomás Barrios Vera
- Score: 6–1, 6–2

Events
| Singles | Doubles |
| ← 2021 · | Almaty Challenger | · 2022 → |

Zizou Bergs was the defending champion but lost in the second round to Pavel Kotov.

Jesper de Jong won the title after defeating Marcelo Tomás Barrios Vera 6–1, 6–2 in the final.

== Seeds ==
1. (Slovakia) Andrej Martin (semifinals)
2. (Egypt) Mohamed Safwat (second round)
3. (Belgium) Kimmer Coppejans (first round)
4. (Italy) Lorenzo Giustino (first round)
5. (Kazakhstan) Dmitry Popko (second round)
6. (Uzbekistan) Denis Istomin (first round)
7. (Brazil) João Menezes (second round)
8. (Canada) Brayden Schnur (quarterfinals)

== Draw ==
=== Key ===
- Q = Qualifier
- WC = Wild card
- LL = Lucky loser
- Alt = Alternate
- SE = Special exempt
- PR = Protected ranking
- ITF = ITF entry
- JE = Junior exempt
- w/o = Walkover
- r = Retired
- d = Defaulted
- SR = Special ranking

=== Finals ===
Semifinals
1 | (Slovakia) Andrej Martin | 3 | 0
(Chile) Marcelo Tomás Barrios Vera | 6 | 6
Q | (Netherlands) Jesper de Jong | 6 | 7^{7}
(Bosnia and Herzegovina) Mirza Bašić | 4 | 6^{3}

Final
(Chile) Marcelo Tomás Barrios Vera | 1 | 2
Q | (Netherlands) Jesper de Jong | 6 | 6

=== Top half ===
First round
1 | (Slovakia) A Martin | 6 | 7^{13}
Q | (Ukraine) V Sachko | 4 | 6^{11}
(Russia) E Tiurnev | 7^{12} | 3 | 5
WC | (Kazakhstan) D Yevseyev | 6^{10} | 6 | 7
(Chinese Taipei) C-h Tseng | 5 | 6 | 2
(Spain) C Gimeno Valero | 7 | 4 | 6
(Spain) A Menéndez Maceiras | 5 | 3
8 | (Canada) B Schnur | 7 | 6
4 | (Italy) L Giustino | 6^{3} | 4
(Russia) P Kotov | 7^{7} | 6
(Belgium) Z Bergs | 6 | 5 | 6
Q | (Turkey) E Kırkın | 4 | 7 | 2
(Chile) MT Barrios Vera | 7^{7} | 6
Q | (Ukraine) V Orlov | 6^{3} | 2
(Croatia) N Serdarušić | 4 | 3
5 | (Kazakhstan) D Popko | 6 | 6

Second round
1 | (Slovakia) A Martin | 6 | 6
WC | (Kazakhstan) D Yevseyev | 4 | 2
(Spain) C Gimeno Valero | 4 | 6^{6}
8 | (Canada) B Schnur | 6 | 7^{8}
(Russia) P Kotov | 6 | 4 | 6
(Belgium) Z Bergs | 3 | 6 | 2
(Chile) MT Barrios Vera | 6 | 6
5 | (Kazakhstan) D Popko | 4 | 1

Quarterfinals
1 | (Slovakia) A Martin | 7^{9} | 7
8 | (Canada) B Schnur | 6^{7} | 5
(Russia) P Kotov | 3 | 6 | 4
(Chile) MT Barrios Vera | 6 | 2 | 6

Semifinals
1 | (Slovakia) A Martin | 3 | 0
(Chile) MT Barrios Vera | 6 | 6

=== Bottom half ===
First round
6 | (Uzbekistan) D Istomin | 3 | 1
(Italy) R Bonadio | 6 | 6
(Chinese Taipei) T-l Wu | 4 | 5
LL | (Romania) FC Jianu | 6 | 7
(Serbia) P Krstin | 0^{r}
(Russia) T Gabashvili | 3
Q | (Netherlands) J de Jong | 6 | 6
3 | (Belgium) K Coppejans | 4 | 2
7 | (Brazil) J Menezes | 6 | 6
WC | (Kazakhstan) Dostanbek Tashbulatov | 2 | 0
(Bosnia and Herzegovina) M Bašić | 6 | 6
SE | (Kazakhstan) T Skatov | 3 | 1
(Italy) GM Moroni | 4 | 6 | 4
(Bulgaria) D Kuzmanov | 6 | 3 | 1^{r}
WC | (Kazakhstan) B Zhukayev | 4 | 4
2 | (Egypt) M Safwat | 6 | 6

Second round
(Italy) R Bonadio | 6 | 7^{7}
LL | (Romania) FC Jianu | 1 | 6^{2}
(Russia) T Gabashvili | 3 | 2
Q | (Netherlands) J de Jong | 6 | 6
7 | (Brazil) J Menezes | 6 | 2 | 5
(Bosnia and Herzegovina) M Bašić | 4 | 6 | 7
(Italy) GM Moroni | 4 | 6 | 6
2 | (Egypt) M Safwat | 6 | 3 | 3

Quarterfinals
(Italy) R Bonadio | 6^{6} | 2
Q | (Netherlands) J de Jong | 7^{8} | 6
(Bosnia and Herzegovina) M Bašić | 6 | 7
(Italy) GM Moroni | 3 | 5

Semifinals
Q | (Netherlands) J de Jong | 6 | 7^{7}
(Bosnia and Herzegovina) M Bašić | 4 | 6^{3}
