= 2018 Almaty Challenger – Doubles =

Doubles
- 2018 Almaty Challenger

Final
- Champions: (Germany) Kevin Krawietz (Germany) Andreas Mies
- Runners-up: (Lithuania) Laurynas Grigelis (Ukraine) Vladyslav Manafov
- Score: 6–2, 7–6^{(7–2)}

Events
Singles	Doubles
- Almaty Challenger

Timur Khabibulin and Aleksandr Nedovyesov were the defending champions but lost in the quarterfinals to Nikola Čačić and Nino Serdarušić.

Kevin Krawietz and Andreas Mies won the title after defeating Laurynas Grigelis and Vladyslav Manafov 6–2, 7–6^{(7–2)} in the final.

== Seeds ==
1. (Germany) Kevin Krawietz / (Germany) Andreas Mies (champions)
2. (Japan) Toshihide Matsui / (Japan) Yasutaka Uchiyama (first round)
3. (Spain) Gerard Granollers / (Spain) Enrique López Pérez (semifinals)
4. (United States) Robert Galloway / (United States) Nathaniel Lammons (quarterfinals)

== Draw ==
Key

- Q = Qualifier
- WC = Wild card
- LL = Lucky loser
- Alt = Alternate
- ITF = ITF entry
- PR = Protected ranking
- SR = Special ranking
- SE = Special exempt
- JE = Junior exempt
- JR = Junior Accelerator Programme entrant
- CO = College Accelerator Programme entrant
- NG = Next Gen Accelerator Program entrant
- w/o = Walkover
- r = Retired
- d = Defaulted

First round
1	(Germany) K Krawietz (Germany) A Mies	6	2	[10]
(Argentina) H Casanova (United States) A Lawson	4	6	[5]
WC	(Kazakhstan) T Skatov (Kazakhstan) Dostanbek Tashbulatov	0	3
WC	(India) A Kadhe (Kazakhstan) D Yevseyev	6	6
3	(Spain) G Granollers (Spain) E López Pérez	6	6
(Austria) S Ofner (Bosnia and Herzegovina) A Šetkić	1	2
(Croatia) A Pavić (Brazil) F Romboli	6^{4}	3
(Portugal) G Oliveira (Spain) R Ortega Olmedo	7^{7}	6
(Chinese Taipei) T Chen (New Zealand) R Statham	1	5
(Lithuania) L Grigelis (Ukraine) V Manafov	6	7
(Serbia) P Krstin (Serbia) N Milojević	6^{4}	6^{2}
4	(United States) R Galloway (United States) N Lammons	7^{7}	7^{7}
WC	(Kazakhstan) T Khabibulin (Kazakhstan) A Nedovyesov	5	6	[10]
(Russia) M Elgin (Russia) E Tyurnev	7	3	[7]
(Serbia) N Čačić (Croatia) N Serdarušić	7^{7}	6
2	(Japan) T Matsui (Japan) Y Uchiyama	6^{3}	2

Quarterfinals
1	(Germany) K Krawietz (Germany) A Mies	7^{7}	4	[10]
WC	(India) A Kadhe (Kazakhstan) D Yevseyev	6^{5}	6	[5]
3	(Spain) G Granollers (Spain) E López Pérez	6^{0}	6	[10]
(Portugal) G Oliveira (Spain) R Ortega Olmedo	7^{7}	3	[7]
(Lithuania) L Grigelis (Ukraine) V Manafov	6	6
4	(United States) R Galloway (United States) N Lammons	4	3
WC	(Kazakhstan) T Khabibulin (Kazakhstan) A Nedovyesov	6^{3}	3
(Serbia) N Čačić (Croatia) N Serdarušić	7^{7}	6

Semifinals
1	(Germany) K Krawietz (Germany) A Mies	6	6
3	(Spain) G Granollers (Spain) E López Pérez	1	4
(Lithuania) L Grigelis (Ukraine) V Manafov	6	6
(Serbia) N Čačić (Croatia) N Serdarušić	3	2

Final
1	(Germany) K Krawietz (Germany) A Mies	6	7^{7}
(Lithuania) L Grigelis (Ukraine) V Manafov	2	6^{2}
