= 2021 Almaty Challenger – Singles =

Singles
- 2021 Almaty Challenger

Final
- Champion: (Belgium) Zizou Bergs
- Runner-up: (Kazakhstan) Timofey Skatov
- Score: 4–6, 6–3, 6–2

Events
| Singles | Doubles |
| ← 2019 · | Almaty Challenger | · 2021 → |

Lorenzo Giustino was the defending champion but lost in the first round to Timofey Skatov.

Zizou Bergs won the title after defeating Skatov 4–6, 6–3, 6–2 in the final.

== Seeds ==
1. (Slovakia) Andrej Martin (quarterfinals)
2. (Egypt) Mohamed Safwat (first round)
3. (Belgium) Kimmer Coppejans (quarterfinals)
4. (France) Enzo Couacaud (second round)
5. (Italy) Lorenzo Giustino (first round)
6. (Kazakhstan) Dmitry Popko (semifinals, retired)
7. (Uzbekistan) Denis Istomin (second round)
8. (Brazil) João Menezes (second round)

== Draw ==
=== Key ===
- Q = Qualifier
- WC = Wild card
- LL = Lucky loser
- Alt = Alternate
- SE = Special exempt
- PR = Protected ranking
- ITF = ITF entry
- JE = Junior exempt
- w/o = Walkover
- r = Retired
- d = Defaulted
- SR = Special ranking

=== Finals ===
Semifinals
6 | (Kazakhstan) Dmitry Popko | 7 | 3 | 1^{r}
(Belgium) Zizou Bergs | 5 | 6 | 5
(Chinese Taipei) Tseng Chun-hsin | 2 | 3
WC | (Kazakhstan) Timofey Skatov | 6 | 6

Final
(Belgium) Zizou Bergs | 4 | 6 | 6
WC | (Kazakhstan) Timofey Skatov | 6 | 3 | 2

=== Top half ===
First round
1 | (Slovakia) A Martin | 6 | 6
WC | (Kazakhstan) B Zhukayev | 2 | 1
(Canada) B Schnur | 6 | 6
(Chinese Taipei) T-l Wu | 4 | 4
(Russia) T Gabashvili | 1 | 3
Q | (Romania) FC Jianu | 6 | 6
Q | (Ukraine) V Orlov | 2 | 3
6 | (Kazakhstan) D Popko | 6 | 6
3 | (Belgium) K Coppejans | 6 | 6
Alt | (Spain) R Ortega Olmedo | 1 | 2
(Croatia) N Serdarušić | 5 | 1
(Italy) GM Moroni | 7 | 6
(Belgium) Z Bergs | 2 | 7^{11} | 6
(Chile) MT Barrios Vera | 6 | 6^{9} | 3
(Russia) E Tiurnev | 3 | 1
8 | (Brazil) J Menezes | 6 | 6

Second round
1 | (Slovakia) A Martin | 6 | 6
(Canada) B Schnur | 2 | 2
Q | (Romania) FC Jianu | 5 | 3
6 | (Kazakhstan) D Popko | 7 | 6
3 | (Belgium) K Coppejans | 2 | 6 | 6
(Italy) GM Moroni | 6 | 3 | 1
(Belgium) Z Bergs | 6 | 6
8 | (Brazil) J Menezes | 3 | 4

Quarterfinals
1 | (Slovakia) A Martin | 5 | 3
6 | (Kazakhstan) D Popko | 7 | 6
3 | (Belgium) K Coppejans | 3 | 6 | 4
(Belgium) Z Bergs | 6 | 2 | 6

Semifinals
6 | (Kazakhstan) D Popko | 7 | 3 | 1^{r}
(Belgium) Z Bergs | 5 | 6 | 5

=== Bottom half ===
First round
7 | (Uzbekistan) D Istomin | 3 | 6 | 6
(Bosnia and Herzegovina) M Bašić | 6 | 4 | 2
(Chinese Taipei) C-h Tseng | 6 | 6
(Brazil) F Meligeni Alves | 2 | 1
(Bulgaria) D Kuzmanov | 6 | 6
(Spain) A Menéndez Maceiras | 2 | 4
Q | (Ukraine) V Sachko | 7^{7} | 5 | 2
4 | (France) E Couacaud | 6^{2} | 7 | 6
5 | (Italy) L Giustino | 4 | 6 | 2
WC | (Kazakhstan) T Skatov | 6 | 3 | 6
WC | (Kazakhstan) D Yevseyev | 6 | 4 | 7
(Italy) R Bonadio | 4 | 6 | 5
Q | (France) E Furness | 1 | 6 | 6
(Spain) C Gimeno Valero | 6 | 2 | 3
(Serbia) P Krstin | 6 | 6
2 | (Egypt) M Safwat | 4 | 0

Second round
7 | (Uzbekistan) D Istomin | 6^{7} | 4
(Chinese Taipei) C-h Tseng | 7^{9} | 6
(Bulgaria) D Kuzmanov | 7 | 6
4 | (France) E Couacaud | 5 | 0
WC | (Kazakhstan) T Skatov | 1 | 6 | 6
WC | (Kazakhstan) D Yevseyev | 6 | 1 | 4
Q | (France) E Furness | 6 | 6
(Serbia) P Krstin | 3 | 1

Quarterfinals
(Chinese Taipei) C-h Tseng | 7^{7} | 6
(Bulgaria) D Kuzmanov | 6^{1} | 3
WC | (Kazakhstan) T Skatov | 4 | 7^{10} | 6
Q | (France) E Furness | 6 | 6^{8} | 4

Semifinals
(Chinese Taipei) C-h Tseng | 2 | 3
WC | (Kazakhstan) T Skatov | 6 | 6
