= 2019 Almaty Challenger – Doubles =

Doubles
- 2019 Almaty Challenger

Final
- Champions: (Slovakia) Andrej Martin (Chile) Hans Podlipnik Castillo
- Runners-up: (Portugal) Gonçalo Oliveira (Belarus) Andrei Vasilevski
- Score: 7–6^{(7–4)}, 3–6, [10–8]

Events
Singles	Doubles
- Almaty Challenger

Zdeněk Kolář and Lukáš Rosol were the defending champions but chose not to defend their title.

Andrej Martin and Hans Podlipnik Castillo won the title after defeating Gonçalo Oliveira and Andrei Vasilevski 7–6^{(7–4)}, 3–6, [10–8] in the final.

== Seeds ==
1. (Portugal) Gonçalo Oliveira / (Belarus) Andrei Vasilevski (final)
2. (Bosnia and Herzegovina) Tomislav Brkić / (Croatia) Ante Pavić (quarterfinals)
3. (Uruguay) Ariel Behar / (Ecuador) Gonzalo Escobar (semifinals)
4. (Slovakia) Andrej Martin / (Chile) Hans Podlipnik Castillo (champions)

== Draw ==
Key

- Q = Qualifier
- WC = Wild card
- LL = Lucky loser
- Alt = Alternate
- ITF = ITF entry
- PR = Protected ranking
- SR = Special ranking
- SE = Special exempt
- JE = Junior exempt
- JR = Junior Accelerator Programme entrant
- CO = College Accelerator Programme entrant
- NG = Next Gen Accelerator Program entrant
- w/o = Walkover
- r = Retired
- d = Defaulted

First round
1	(Portugal) G Oliveira (Belarus) A Vasilevski	6	6
WC	(Kazakhstan) T Skatov (Spain) M Vilella Martínez	2	2
ITF	(Italy) R Bonadio (Tunisia) S Mansouri	6	6
(Sweden) A Göransson (Switzerland) M-A Hüsler	4	2
3	(Uruguay) A Behar (Ecuador) G Escobar	6	6
(Australia) M Purcell (Australia) A Santillan	4	2
ITF	(Philippines) F Alcantara (Kazakhstan) G Lomakin	4	6^{1}
(Russia) E Karlovskiy (Russia) A Pavlioutchenkov	6	7^{7}
(Russia) I Gakhov (United States) E King	3	6	[5]
(Kazakhstan) T Khabibulin (Ukraine) V Manafov	6	2	[10]
(Canada) S Diez (Serbia) N Milojević	3	6^{6}
4	(Slovakia) A Martin (Chile) H Podlipnik Castillo	6	7^{8}
(Italy) L Giustino (France) G Sakharov	4	6	[10]
WC	(Russia) R Safiullin (Kazakhstan) D Yevseyev	6	2	[5]
WC	(Kazakhstan) A Golubev (Kazakhstan) A Nedovyesov	4	6	[10]
2	(Bosnia and Herzegovina) T Brkić (Croatia) A Pavić	6	3	[12]

Quarterfinals
1	(Portugal) G Oliveira (Belarus) A Vasilevski	6	6
ITF	(Italy) R Bonadio (Tunisia) S Mansouri	1	4
3	(Uruguay) A Behar (Ecuador) G Escobar	6	6
(Russia) E Karlovskiy (Russia) A Pavlioutchenkov	4	4
(Kazakhstan) T Khabibulin (Ukraine) V Manafov	7	5	[10]
4	(Slovakia) A Martin (Chile) H Podlipnik Castillo	5	7	[12]
(Italy) L Giustino (France) G Sakharov	6	3	[10]
2	(Bosnia and Herzegovina) T Brkić (Croatia) A Pavić	3	6	[7]

Semifinals
1	(Portugal) G Oliveira (Belarus) A Vasilevski	6	6
3	(Uruguay) A Behar (Ecuador) G Escobar	4	0
4	(Slovakia) A Martin (Chile) H Podlipnik Castillo	7^{9}	7
(Italy) L Giustino (France) G Sakharov	6^{7}	5

Final
1	(Portugal) G Oliveira (Belarus) A Vasilevski	6^{4}	6	[8]
4	(Slovakia) A Martin (Chile) H Podlipnik Castillo	7^{7}	3	[10]
