= 2021 Almaty Challenger II – Doubles =

Doubles
- 2021 Almaty Challenger II

Final
- Champions: (Ukraine) Vladyslav Manafov (Ukraine) Vitaliy Sachko
- Runners-up: (France) Corentin Denolly (Spain) Adrián Menéndez Maceiras
- Score: 6–1, 6–4

Events
Singles	Doubles
← 2021 ·	Almaty Challenger	· 2022 →

Jesper de Jong and Vitaliy Sachko were the defending champions but only Sachko chose to defend his title, partnering Vladyslav Manafov.

Sachko successfully defended his title after defeating Corentin Denolly and Adrián Menéndez Maceiras 6–1, 6–4 in the final.

== Seeds ==
1. (Russia) Teymuraz Gabashvili / (Russia) Pavel Kotov (semifinals)
2. (Canada) Brayden Schnur / (Chinese Taipei) Yang Tsung-hua (first round)
3. (France) Corentin Denolly / (Spain) Adrián Menéndez Maceiras (final)
4. (Uzbekistan) Denis Istomin / (Kazakhstan) Denis Yevseyev (semifinals, withdrew)

== Draw ==
=== Key ===
- Q = Qualifier
- WC = Wild card
- LL = Lucky loser
- Alt = Alternate
- SE = Special exempt
- PR = Protected ranking
- ITF = ITF entry
- JE = Junior exempt
- w/o = Walkover
- r = Retired
- d = Defaulted
- SR = Special ranking

First round
WC	(Kazakhstan) Dostanbek Tashbulatov (Kazakhstan) B Zhukayev	w/o
(Kazakhstan) D Popko (Russia) E Tiurnev
3	(France) C Denolly (Spain) A Menéndez Maceiras	6^{5}	6	[10]
(Ukraine) V Orlov (Uzbekistan) K Sultanov	7^{7}	3	[4]
WC	(Kazakhstan) Yerassyl Murat (Kazakhstan) Danil Ozernoy	3	6^{5}
WC	(Slovakia) Patrik Fabian (Slovakia) A Martin	6	7^{7}
(Russia) I Gakhov (Kazakhstan) T Skatov
(Russia) Yan Bondarevskiy (Kazakhstan) G Lomakin	w/o
(France) E Furness (Turkey) E Kırkın
4	(Uzbekistan) D Istomin (Kazakhstan) D Yevseyev	w/o
(Ukraine) V Manafov (Ukraine) V Sachko	w/o
(Bosnia and Herzegovina) M Bašić (Croatia) N Serdarušić
(Chinese Taipei) C-h Tseng (Chinese Taipei) T-l Wu	6	2	[12]
2	(Canada) B Schnur (Chinese Taipei) T-h Yang	2	6	[10]

Quarterfinals
1	(Russia) T Gabashvili (Russia) P Kotov	w/o
WC	(Kazakhstan) D Tashbulatov (Kazakhstan) B Zhukayev
3	(France) C Denolly (Spain) A Menéndez Maceiras	1	6	[10]
WC	(Slovakia) P Fabian (Slovakia) A Martin	6	3	[3]
(Russia) Y Bondarevskiy (Kazakhstan) G Lomakin
4	(Uzbekistan) D Istomin (Kazakhstan) D Yevseyev	w/o
(Ukraine) V Manafov (Ukraine) V Sachko	6	3	[10]
(Chinese Taipei) C-h Tseng (Chinese Taipei) T-l Wu	3	6	[8]

Semifinals
1	(Russia) T Gabashvili (Russia) P Kotov	3	4
3	(France) C Denolly (Spain) A Menéndez Maceiras	6	6
4	(Uzbekistan) D Istomin (Kazakhstan) D Yevseyev
(Ukraine) V Manafov (Ukraine) V Sachko	w/o

Final
3	(France) C Denolly (Spain) A Menéndez Maceiras	1	4
(Ukraine) V Manafov (Ukraine) V Sachko	6	6
