= 2018 Almaty Challenger – Singles =

Singles
- 2018 Almaty Challenger

Final
- Champion: (Austria) Jurij Rodionov
- Runner-up: (Serbia) Peđa Krstin
- Score: 7–5, 6–2

Events
Singles	Doubles
- Almaty Challenger

Filip Krajinović was the defending champion but chose not to defend his title.

Jurij Rodionov won the title after defeating Peđa Krstin 7–5, 6–2 in the final.

== Seeds ==
1. (France) Calvin Hemery (first round, retired)
2. (Germany) Yannick Hanfmann (semifinals)
3. (Bolivia) Hugo Dellien (first round)
4. (Austria) Sebastian Ofner (first round)
5. (Egypt) Mohamed Safwat (first round)
6. (Serbia) Nikola Milojević (second round)
7. (Croatia) Nino Serdarušić (second round)
8. (Belarus) Uladzimir Ignatik (second round)

== Draw ==
Key

- Q = Qualifier
- WC = Wild card
- LL = Lucky loser
- Alt = Alternate
- ITF = ITF entry
- PR = Protected ranking
- SR = Special ranking
- SE = Special exempt
- JE = Junior exempt
- JR = Junior Accelerator Programme entrant
- CO = College Accelerator Programme entrant
- NG = Next Gen Accelerator Program entrant
- w/o = Walkover
- r = Retired
- d = Defaulted

=== Finals ===
Semifinals
(Serbia) Peđa Krstin	6	6
(Spain) Enrique López Pérez	1	3
Q	(Austria) Jurij Rodionov	6	7
2	(Germany) Yannick Hanfmann	4	5

Final
(Serbia) Peđa Krstin	5	2
Q	(Austria) Jurij Rodionov	7	6

=== Top half ===
First round
1	(France) C Hemery	2^{r}
LL	(Japan) Y Takahashi	3
(South Korea) D-h Lee	5	5
SE	(Dominican Republic) R Cid Subervi	7	7
(Croatia) A Pavić	6	6
(Russia) I Nedelko	1	3
(Serbia) P Krstin	6	6
5	(Egypt) M Safwat	4	2
4	(Austria) S Ofner	3	2
Q	(New Zealand) R Statham	6	6
WC	(Kazakhstan) T Skatov	0	1
(Chinese Taipei) T-h Yang	6	6
(Japan) Y Uchiyama	7	3	2
(Spain) E López Pérez	5	6	6
(India) S Nagal	7^{7}	4	1
8	(Belarus) U Ignatik	6^{3}	6	6

Second round
LL	(Japan) Y Takahashi	1	0
SE	(Dominican Republic) R Cid Subervi	6	6
(Croatia) A Pavić	4	2
(Serbia) P Krstin	6	6
Q	(New Zealand) R Statham	3	7^{7}	6^{4}
(Chinese Taipei) T-h Yang	6	6^{5}	7^{7}
(Spain) E López Pérez	6	6
8	(Belarus) U Ignatik	3	0

Quarterfinals
SE	(Dominican Republic) R Cid Subervi	2	7	3
(Serbia) P Krstin	6	5	6
(Chinese Taipei) T-h Yang	5	3
(Spain) E López Pérez	7	6

Semifinals
(Serbia) P Krstin	6	6
(Spain) E López Pérez	1	3

=== Bottom half ===
First round
7	(Croatia) N Serdarušić	6	7^{7}
Q	(Spain) G Granollers	3	6^{4}
WC	(Kazakhstan) T Khabibulin	4	6	2
(Kazakhstan) A Nedovyesov	6	3	6
Q	(Austria) J Rodionov	3	6	6
(Spain) Carlos Boluda-Purkiss	6	3	2
WC	(Russia) A Avidzba	6	6
3	(Bolivia) H Dellien	4	4
6	(Serbia) N Milojević	6	6
(Argentina) H Casanova	2	3
(Portugal) G Oliveira	6	3	1
(Brazil) G Clezar	3	6	6
WC	(Kazakhstan) D Yevseyev	4	6^{5}
(Spain) D Muñoz de la Nava	6	7^{7}
Q	(Germany) D Masur	6^{3}	1
2	(Germany) Y Hanfmann	7^{7}	6

Second round
7	(Croatia) N Serdarušić	7	4	4
(Kazakhstan) A Nedovyesov	5	6	6
Q	(Austria) J Rodionov	6	7
WC	(Russia) A Avidzba	3	5
6	(Serbia) N Milojević	2	6	1
(Brazil) G Clezar	6	3	6
(Spain) D Muñoz de la Nava	1	3
2	(Germany) Y Hanfmann	6	6

Quarterfinals
(Kazakhstan) A Nedovyesov	6	5	6^{4}
Q	(Austria) J Rodionov	3	7	7^{7}
(Brazil) G Clezar	3	2
2	(Germany) Y Hanfmann	6	6

Semifinals
Q	(Austria) J Rodionov	6	7
2	(Germany) Y Hanfmann	4	5
