= 2021 Almaty Challenger =

- Date: 7 – 13 June
- Edition: 5th
- Draw: 32S / 16D
- Surface: Clay
- Location: Almaty, Kazakhstan

Champions

Singles
- (Belgium) Zizou Bergs

Doubles
- (Netherlands) Jesper de Jong / (Ukraine) Vitaliy Sachko
← 2019 ·	Almaty Challenger	· 2021 →

The 2021 Almaty Challenger was a professional tennis tournament played on clay courts. It was the fifth edition of the tournament which was part of the 2021 ATP Challenger Tour. It took place in Almaty, Kazakhstan between 7 and 13 June 2021.

== Singles main draw entrants ==
=== Seeds ===
Country	Player	Rank^{1}	Seed
SVK	Andrej Martin	108	1
EGY	Mohamed Safwat	162	2
BEL	Kimmer Coppejans	174	3
FRA	Enzo Couacaud	177	4
ITA	Lorenzo Giustino	178	5
KAZ	Dmitry Popko	195	6
UZB	Denis Istomin	204	7
BRA	João Menezes	211	8

- ^{1} Rankings are as of 31 May 2021.

=== Other entrants ===
The following players received entry into the singles main draw as wildcards:

- (Kazakhstan) Timofey Skatov
- (Kazakhstan) Denis Yevseyev
- (Kazakhstan) Beibit Zhukayev

The following player received entry into the singles main draw as an alternate:

- (Spain) Roberto Ortega Olmedo

The following players received entry from the qualifying draw:

- (France) Evan Furness
- (Romania) Filip Jianu
- (Ukraine) Vladyslav Orlov
- (Ukraine) Vitaliy Sachko

== Champions ==
=== Singles ===
- (Belgium) Zizou Bergs def. (Kazakhstan) Timofey Skatov 4–6, 6–3, 6–2.

=== Doubles ===
- (Netherlands) Jesper de Jong / (Ukraine) Vitaliy Sachko def. (Ukraine) Vladyslav Manafov / (Russia) Evgenii Tiurnev 7–6^{(7–4)}, 6–1.
