= 2021 Almaty Challenger II =

- Date: 14 – 20 June
- Edition: 6th
- Draw: 32S / 16D
- Surface: Clay
- Location: Almaty, Kazakhstan

Champions

Singles
- (Netherlands) Jesper de Jong

Doubles
- (Ukraine) Vladyslav Manafov / (Ukraine) Vitaliy Sachko
← 2021 ·	Almaty Challenger	· 2022 →

The 2021 Almaty Challenger II was a professional tennis tournament played on clay courts. It was the sixth edition of the tournament which was part of the 2021 ATP Challenger Tour. It took place in Almaty, Kazakhstan between 14 and 20 June 2021.

== Singles main draw entrants ==
=== Seeds ===
Country	Player	Rank^{1}	Seed
SVK	Andrej Martin	108	1
EGY	Mohamed Safwat	162	2
BEL	Kimmer Coppejans	174	3
ITA	Lorenzo Giustino	178	4
KAZ	Dmitry Popko	195	5
UZB	Denis Istomin	204	6
BRA	João Menezes	211	7
CAN	Brayden Schnur	225	8

- ^{1} Rankings are as of 31 May 2021.

=== Other entrants ===
The following players received entry into the singles main draw as wildcards:

- (Kazakhstan) Dostanbek Tashbulatov
- (Kazakhstan) Denis Yevseyev
- (Kazakhstan) Beibit Zhukayev

The following player received entry into the singles main draw as a special exempt:

- (Kazakhstan) Timofey Skatov

The following players received entry from the qualifying draw:

- (Netherlands) Jesper de Jong
- (Turkey) Ergi Kırkın
- (Ukraine) Vladyslav Orlov
- (Ukraine) Vitaliy Sachko

The following player received entry as a lucky loser:

- (Romania) Filip Jianu

== Champions ==
=== Singles ===
- (Netherlands) Jesper de Jong def. (Chile) Marcelo Tomás Barrios Vera 6–1, 6–2.

=== Doubles ===
- (Ukraine) Vladyslav Manafov / (Ukraine) Vitaliy Sachko def. (France) Corentin Denolly / (Spain) Adrián Menéndez Maceiras 6–1, 6–4.
