= 2018 Almaty Challenger 2 – Doubles =

Doubles
- 2018 Almaty Challenger 2

Final
- Champions: (Czech Republic) Zdeněk Kolář (Czech Republic) Lukáš Rosol
- Runners-up: (Russia) Evgeny Karlovskiy (Kazakhstan) Timur Khabibulin
- Score: 6–3, 6–1

Events
Singles	Doubles
- Almaty Challenger

Kevin Krawietz and Andreas Mies were the defending champions but chose not to defend their title.

Zdeněk Kolář and Lukáš Rosol won the title after defeating Evgeny Karlovskiy and Timur Khabibulin 6–3, 6–1 in the final.

== Seeds ==
1. (Russia) Mikhail Elgin / (Portugal) Gonçalo Oliveira (first round)
2. (Ukraine) Vladyslav Manafov / (Belarus) Andrei Vasilevski (first round)
3. (Austria) Tristan-Samuel Weissborn / (Switzerland) Luca Margaroli (semifinals)
4. (Belarus) Aliaksandr Bury / (Belarus) Yaraslav Shyla (first round)

== Draw ==
Key

- Q = Qualifier
- WC = Wild card
- LL = Lucky loser
- Alt = Alternate
- ITF = ITF entry
- PR = Protected ranking
- SR = Special ranking
- SE = Special exempt
- JE = Junior exempt
- JR = Junior Accelerator Programme entrant
- CO = College Accelerator Programme entrant
- NG = Next Gen Accelerator Program entrant
- w/o = Walkover
- r = Retired
- d = Defaulted

First round
1	(Russia) M Elgin (Portugal) G Oliveira	5	7	[4]
(Czech Republic) Z Kolář (Czech Republic) L Rosol	7	5	[10]
(Serbia) N Milojević (Egypt) M Safwat	6^{4}	6	[11]
(Bosnia and Herzegovina) M Bašić (Serbia) D Petrović	7^{7}	1	[9]
3	(Switzerland) L Margaroli (Austria) T-S Weissborn	6	6
WC	(Russia) K Kravchuk (Kazakhstan) G Lomakin	4	2
(Belarus) U Ignatik (Poland) K Majchrzak	7	4	[8]
WC	(Kazakhstan) A Nedovyesov (Kazakhstan) D Yevseyev	5	6	[10]
(Russia) A Pavlioutchenkov (Chinese Taipei) T-h Yang	6	6
(France) Q Halys (France) T Lamasine	4	3
(Spain) E López Pérez (New Zealand) R Statham	6	6
4	(Belarus) A Bury (Belarus) Y Shyla	3	4
WC	(Russia) A Avidzba (France) A Escoffier	6^{6}	2
(Russia) E Karlovskiy (Kazakhstan) T Khabibulin	7^{8}	6
(Kazakhstan) A Bublik (Serbia) M Kecmanović	6	6
2	(Ukraine) V Manafov (Belarus) A Vasilevski	2	4

Quarterfinals
(Czech Republic) Z Kolář (Czech Republic) L Rosol	6	6
(Serbia) N Milojević (Egypt) M Safwat	3	2
3	(Switzerland) L Margaroli (Austria) T-S Weissborn	6	6
WC	(Kazakhstan) A Nedovyesov (Kazakhstan) D Yevseyev	3	4
(Russia) A Pavlioutchenkov (Chinese Taipei) T-h Yang	7^{7}	6
(Spain) E López Pérez (New Zealand) R Statham	6^{2}	4
(Russia) E Karlovskiy (Kazakhstan) T Khabibulin	5	7	[10]
(Kazakhstan) A Bublik (Serbia) M Kecmanović	7	5	[5]

Semifinals
(Czech Republic) Z Kolář (Czech Republic) L Rosol	7	5	[10]
3	(Switzerland) L Margaroli (Austria) T-S Weissborn	5	7	[6]
(Russia) A Pavlioutchenkov (Chinese Taipei) T-h Yang	6	3	[10]
(Russia) E Karlovskiy (Kazakhstan) T Khabibulin	2	6	[12]

Final
(Czech Republic) Z Kolář (Czech Republic) L Rosol	6	6
(Russia) E Karlovskiy (Kazakhstan) T Khabibulin	3	1
