= 2018 Almaty Challenger 2 =

- Date: 1–6 October
- Edition: 3rd
- Draw: 32S / 16D
- Surface: Hard
- Location: Almaty, Kazakhstan

Champions

Singles
- (Uzbekistan) Denis Istomin

Doubles
- (Czech Republic) Zdeněk Kolář / (Czech Republic) Lukáš Rosol
← 2018 ·	Almaty Challenger	· 2019 →

The 2018 Almaty Challenger 2 was a professional tennis tournament played on hard courts. It was the third edition of the tournament which was part of the 2018 ATP Challenger Tour. It took place in Almaty, Kazakhstan between 1 and 6 October 2018.

== Singles main draw entrants ==
=== Seeds ===
Country	Player	Rank^{1}	Seed
UZB	Denis Istomin	64	1
~~FRA~~	~~Pierre-Hugues Herbert~~	~~67~~	~~2~~
BIH	Mirza Bašić	79	3
FRA	Quentin Halys	146	4
CAN	Félix Auger-Aliassime	147	5
ESP	Enrique López Pérez	163	6
SRB	Miomir Kecmanović	168	7
CZE	Lukáš Rosol	177	8

- ^{1} Rankings are as of 24 September 2018.

=== Other entrants ===
The following players received entry into the singles main draw as wildcards:

- (Kazakhstan) Sagadat Ayap
- (Kazakhstan) Dostanbek Tashbulatov
- (Kazakhstan) Denis Yevseyev

The following players received entry from the qualifying draw:

- (France) Antoine Escoffier
- (Russia) Teymuraz Gabashvili
- (Ukraine) Illya Marchenko
- (Uzbekistan) Khumoyun Sultanov

The following players received entry as lucky losers:

- (Russia) Artem Dubrivnyy
- (New Zealand) Rubin Statham

== Champions ==
=== Singles ===
- (Uzbekistan) Denis Istomin def. (Serbia) Nikola Milojević 6–7^{(4–7)}, 7–6^{(7–5)}, 6–2.

=== Doubles ===
- (Czech Republic) Zdeněk Kolář / (Czech Republic) Lukáš Rosol def. (Russia) Evgeny Karlovskiy / (Kazakhstan) Timur Khabibulin 6–3, 6–1.
