= 2019 Almaty Challenger =

- Date: 3–9 June
- Edition: 4th
- Draw: 48S / 16D
- Surface: Hard
- Location: Almaty, Kazakhstan

Champions

Singles
- (Italy) Lorenzo Giustino

Doubles
- (Slovakia) Andrej Martin / (Chile) Hans Podlipnik Castillo
- Almaty Challenger

The 2019 Almaty Challenger was a professional tennis tournament played on hard courts. It was the fourth edition of the tournament which was part of the 2019 ATP Challenger Tour. It took place in Almaty, Kazakhstan between 3 and 9 June 2019.

== Singles main draw entrants ==
=== Seeds ===
| Country | Player | Rank^{1} | Seed |
|---|---|---|---|
| TUN | Malek Jaziri | 92 | 1 |
| UZB | Denis Istomin | 97 | 2 |
| SRB | Nikola Milojević | 153 | 3 |
| SVK | Andrej Martin | 154 | 4 |
| ITA | Lorenzo Giustino | 159 | 5 |
| GER | Yannick Hanfmann | 180 | 6 |
| AUS | Marc Polmans | 185 | 7 |
| KAZ | Aleksandr Nedovyesov | 189 | 8 |
| SRB | Peđa Krstin | 206 | 9 |
| COL | Santiago Giraldo | 211 | 10 |
| RUS | Evgeny Karlovskiy | 214 | 11 |
| AUS | Akira Santillan | 228 | 12 |
| ARG | Federico Coria | 234 | 13 |
| CAN | Steven Diez | 240 | 14 |
| POR | Gonçalo Oliveira | 254 | 15 |
| ESP | Daniel Gimeno Traver | 258 | 16 |

- ^{1} Rankings are as of 27 May 2019.

=== Other entrants ===
The following players received entry into the singles main draw as wildcards:

- (Kazakhstan) Andrey Golubev
- (United States) Sebastian Korda
- (Bulgaria) Alexandar Lazarov
- (Kazakhstan) Timofei Skatov
- (Uzbekistan) Khumoyun Sultanov

The following player received entry into the singles main draw as an alternate:

- (China) Wu Di

The following players received entry into the singles main draw using their ITF World Tennis Rankings:

- (Italy) Riccardo Bonadio
- (Russia) Konstantin Kravchuk
- (Tunisia) Skander Mansouri
- (Chile) Alejandro Tabilo
- (Russia) Alexander Zhurbin

The following players received entry from the qualifying draw:

- (Russia) Ivan Gakhov
- (Ukraine) Vladyslav Manafov

== Champions ==
=== Singles ===
- (Italy) Lorenzo Giustino def. (Argentina) Federico Coria 6–4, 6–4.

=== Doubles ===
- (Slovakia) Andrej Martin / (Chile) Hans Podlipnik Castillo def. (Portugal) Gonçalo Oliveira / (Belarus) Andrei Vasilevski 7–6^{(7–4)}, 3–6, [10–8].
