= 2022 Parma Challenger – Doubles =

Doubles
- 2022 Parma Challenger

Final
- Champions: (Bosnia and Herzegovina) Tomislav Brkić (Serbia) Nikola Ćaćić
- Runners-up: (Venezuela) Luis David Martínez (Slovakia) Igor Zelenay
- Score: 6–2, 6–2

Events
Singles	Doubles
- Parma Challenger

This was the first edition of the tournament.

Tomislav Brkić and Nikola Ćaćić won the title after defeating Luis David Martínez and Igor Zelenay 6–2, 6–2 in the final.

== Seeds ==
1. (Bosnia and Herzegovina) Tomislav Brkić / (Serbia) Nikola Ćaćić (champions)
2. (United Kingdom) Jonny O'Mara / (Austria) Philipp Oswald (semifinals)
3. (Austria) Alexander Erler / (Austria) Lucas Miedler (quarterfinals)
4. (Monaco) Romain Arneodo / (Austria) Tristan-Samuel Weissborn (first round)

== Draw ==
Key

- Q = Qualifier
- WC = Wild card
- LL = Lucky loser
- Alt = Alternate
- ITF = ITF entry
- PR = Protected ranking
- SR = Special ranking
- SE = Special exempt
- JE = Junior exempt
- JR = Junior Accelerator Programme entrant
- CO = College Accelerator Programme entrant
- NG = Next Gen Accelerator Program entrant
- w/o = Walkover
- r = Retired
- d = Defaulted

First round
1	(Bosnia and Herzegovina) T Brkić (Serbia) N Ćaćić	6	6
WC	(Italy) Alessio De Bernardis (Italy) S Travaglia	4	4
(Romania) VV Cornea (Czech Republic) Z Kolář	4	6	[11]
(Italy) M Bortolotti (Spain) S Martos Gornés	6	3	[9]
3	(Austria) A Erler (Austria) L Miedler	7	4	[10]
(Italy) F Cobolli (Italy) A Vavassori	5	6	[7]
(Italy) Davide Pozzi (Italy) Alexander Weis	6^{4}	1
(India) S Balaji (India) J Nedunchezhiyan	7^{7}	6
(Czech Republic) V Kopřiva (Czech Republic) J Pospíšil	7	6
(Croatia) Z Babić (Sweden) F Bergevi	5	2
(Venezuela) LD Martínez (Slovakia) I Zelenay	6	6
4	(Monaco) R Arneodo (Austria) T-S Weissborn	3	4
(Australia) J Taylor (Australia) B Walkin	6	7^{7}
(Italy) F Passaro (Italy) A Pellegrino	4	6^{5}
WC	(Italy) F Arnaboldi (Italy) G Ferrari	2	3
2	(United Kingdom) J O'Mara (Austria) P Oswald	6	6

Quarterfinals
1	(Bosnia and Herzegovina) T Brkić (Serbia) N Ćaćić	6^{2}	7	[10]
(Romania) VV Cornea (Czech Republic) Z Kolář	7^{7}	5	[7]
3	(Austria) A Erler (Austria) L Miedler	6	5	[4]
(India) S Balaji (India) J Nedunchezhiyan	2	7	[10]
(Czech Republic) V Kopřiva (Czech Republic) J Pospíšil
(Venezuela) LD Martínez (Slovakia) I Zelenay	w/o
(Australia) J Taylor (Australia) B Walkin	3	4
2	(United Kingdom) J O'Mara (Austria) P Oswald	6	6

Semifinals
1	(Bosnia and Herzegovina) T Brkić (Serbia) N Ćaćić	6	6
(India) S Balaji (India) J Nedunchezhiyan	3	4
(Venezuela) LD Martínez (Slovakia) I Zelenay	5	6	[10]
2	(United Kingdom) J O'Mara (Austria) P Oswald	7	3	[8]

Final
1	(Bosnia and Herzegovina) T Brkić (Serbia) N Ćaćić	6	6
(Venezuela) LD Martínez (Slovakia) I Zelenay	2	2
