= 2018 Almaty Challenger 2 – Singles =

Singles
- 2018 Almaty Challenger 2

Final
- Champion: (Uzbekistan) Denis Istomin
- Runner-up: (Serbia) Nikola Milojević
- Score: 6–7^{(4–7)}, 7–6^{(7–5)}, 6–2

Events
Singles	Doubles
- Almaty Challenger

Jurij Rodionov was the defending champion but chose not to defend his title.

Denis Istomin won the title after defeating Nikola Milojević 6–7^{(4–7)}, 7–6^{(7–5)}, 6–2 in the final.

== Seeds ==
1. (Uzbekistan) Denis Istomin (champion)
2. (France) Pierre-Hugues Herbert (withdrew)
3. (Bosnia and Herzegovina) Mirza Bašić (semifinals)
4. (France) Quentin Halys (first round)
5. (Canada) Félix Auger-Aliassime (first round)
6. (Spain) Enrique López Pérez (first round)
7. (Serbia) Miomir Kecmanović (quarterfinals)
8. (Czech Republic) Lukáš Rosol (semifinals)

== Draw ==
Key

- Q = Qualifier
- WC = Wild card
- LL = Lucky loser
- Alt = Alternate
- ITF = ITF entry
- PR = Protected ranking
- SR = Special ranking
- SE = Special exempt
- JE = Junior exempt
- JR = Junior Accelerator Programme entrant
- CO = College Accelerator Programme entrant
- NG = Next Gen Accelerator Program entrant
- w/o = Walkover
- r = Retired
- d = Defaulted

=== Finals ===
Semifinals
1	(Uzbekistan) Denis Istomin	3	6	6
8	(Czech Republic) Lukáš Rosol	6	3	4
3	(Bosnia and Herzegovina) Mirza Bašić	6	6^{3}	3
(Serbia) Nikola Milojević	3	7^{7}	6

Final
1	(Uzbekistan) Denis Istomin	6^{4}	7^{7}	6
(Serbia) Nikola Milojević	7^{7}	6^{5}	2

=== Top half ===
First round
1	(Uzbekistan) D Istomin	6	7
(Portugal) F Ferreira Silva	3	5
(Egypt) M Safwat	6	4	7^{7}
Q	(Uzbekistan) K Sultanov	2	6	6^{4}
(Kazakhstan) A Bublik	3	3
(Poland) K Majchrzak	6	6
(Russia) R Safiullin	3	6	2
7	(Serbia) M Kecmanović	6	3	6
4	(France) Q Halys	2	4
(Germany) T Kamke	6	6
(Russia) I Nedelko	4	6	4
WC	(Kazakhstan) D Yevseyev	6	4	6
(Chinese Taipei) T-h Yang	7^{7}	6
Q	(Russia) T Gabashvili	6^{5}	4
(Russia) E Karlovskiy	6	3	4
8	(Czech Republic) L Rosol	2	6	6

Second round
1	(Uzbekistan) D Istomin	6	6
(Egypt) M Safwat	2	1
(Poland) K Majchrzak	6^{5}	6	6^{1}
7	(Serbia) M Kecmanović	7^{7}	4	7^{7}
(Germany) T Kamke	2	6	6
WC	(Kazakhstan) D Yevseyev	6	2	0
(Chinese Taipei) T-h Yang	6^{2}	6	2
8	(Czech Republic) L Rosol	7^{7}	3	6

Quarterfinals
1	(Uzbekistan) D Istomin	6	6
7	(Serbia) M Kecmanović	3	4
(Germany) T Kamke	1	4
8	(Czech Republic) L Rosol	6	6

Semifinals
1	(Uzbekistan) D Istomin	3	6	6
8	(Czech Republic) L Rosol	6	3	4

=== Bottom half ===
First round
6	(Spain) E López Pérez	6	3	4
Q	(Ukraine) I Marchenko	3	6	6
WC	(Kazakhstan) Sagadat Ayap	3	3
(Czech Republic) Z Kolář	6	6
(Portugal) G Oliveira	6	7^{7}
LL	(New Zealand) R Statham	1	6^{4}
(Serbia) D Petrović	3	3
3	(Bosnia and Herzegovina) M Bašić	6	6
5	(Canada) F Auger-Aliassime	4	6	5
(Serbia) N Milojević	6	1	7
(Kazakhstan) A Nedovyesov	6	6
WC	(Kazakhstan) Dostanbek Tashbulatov	3	1
LL	(Russia) A Dubrivnyy	7^{7}	6
(Belarus) U Ignatik	6^{5}	4
(Netherlands) S Griekspoor	7	4	6
Q	(France) A Escoffier	5	6	3

Second round
Q	(Ukraine) I Marchenko	3	6	6
(Czech Republic) Z Kolář	6	4	4
(Portugal) G Oliveira	6^{4}	7	4
3	(Bosnia and Herzegovina) M Bašić	7^{7}	5	6
(Serbia) N Milojević	6	3	6
(Kazakhstan) A Nedovyesov	3	6	1
LL	(Russia) A Dubrivnyy	1	5
(Netherlands) S Griekspoor	6	7

Quarterfinals
Q	(Ukraine) I Marchenko	5	2^{r}
3	(Bosnia and Herzegovina) M Bašić	7	4
(Serbia) N Milojević	7	6
(Netherlands) S Griekspoor	5	2

Semifinals
3	(Bosnia and Herzegovina) M Bašić	6	6^{3}	3
(Serbia) N Milojević	3	7^{7}	6
