= 2017 Almaty Challenger =

- Date: 2 October – 7 October
- Edition: 1st
- Surface: Clay
- Location: Almaty, Kazakhstan

Champions

Singles
- (Serbia) Filip Krajinović

Doubles
- (Kazakhstan) Timur Khabibulin / (Kazakhstan) Aleksandr Nedovyesov
Almaty Challenger	· 2018 →

The 2017 Almaty Challenger was a professional tennis tournament played on clay courts. It was the first edition of the tournament which was part of the 2017 ATP Challenger Tour. It took place in Almaty, Kazakhstan between 2 October and 7 October 2017.

== Singles main-draw entrants ==
=== Seeds ===
Country	Player	Rank^{1}	Seed
SRB	Laslo Đere	96	1
SRB	Filip Krajinović	105	2
ESP	Guillermo García López	108	3
SVK	Martin Kližan	142	4
BEL	Arthur De Greef	148	5
HUN	Attila Balázs	171	6
BLR	Uladzimir Ignatik	179	7
CZE	Adam Pavlásek	187	8

- ^{1} Rankings are as of September 25, 2017.

=== Other entrants ===
The following players received wildcards into the singles main draw:

- (Kazakhstan) Timur Khabibulin
- (Kazakhstan) Roman Khassanov
- (Slovakia) Alex Molčan
- (Kazakhstan) Denis Yevseyev

The following players received entry from the qualifying draw:

- (Estonia) Vladimir Ivanov
- (Russia) Evgeny Karlovskiy
- (Bulgaria) Alexandar Lazov
- (Ukraine) Denys Molchanov

== Champions ==
=== Singles ===
- (Serbia) Filip Krajinović def. (Serbia) Laslo Đere 6–0, 6–3.

=== Doubles ===
- (Kazakhstan) Timur Khabibulin / (Kazakhstan) Aleksandr Nedovyesov def. (Russia) Ivan Gakhov / (Croatia) Nino Serdarušić 1–6, 6–3, [10–3].
