= 2022 Parma Challenger – Singles =

Singles
- 2022 Parma Challenger

Final
- Champion: (Kazakhstan) Timofey Skatov
- Runner-up: (Slovakia) Jozef Kovalík
- Score: 7–5, 6–7^{(2–7)}, 6–4

Events
Singles	Doubles
Parma Challenger	· 2023 →

This was the first edition of the tournament.

Timofey Skatov won the title after defeating Jozef Kovalík 7–5, 6–7^{(2–7)}, 6–4 in the final.

== Seeds ==
1. (Spain) Roberto Carballés Baena (quarterfinals)
2. (Serbia) Dušan Lajović (quarterfinals)
3. (Argentina) Tomás Martín Etcheverry (first round)
4. (Spain) Pablo Andújar (withdrew)
5. (Italy) Francesco Passaro (first round)
6. (Spain) Carlos Taberner (second round)
7. (Italy) Andrea Pellegrino (first round)
8. (Italy) Marco Cecchinato (first round)

== Draw ==
=== Key ===
- Q = Qualifier
- WC = Wild card
- LL = Lucky loser
- Alt = Alternate
- ITF = ITF entry
- PR = Protected ranking
- SR = Special ranking
- SE = Special exempt
- JE = Junior exempt
- JR = Junior Accelerator Programme entrant
- CO = College Accelerator Programme entrant
- NG = Next Gen Accelerator Program entrant
- w/o = Walkover
- r = Retired
- d = Defaulted

=== Finals ===
Semifinals
(Czech Republic) Vít Kopřiva	3	5
(Slovakia) Jozef Kovalík	6	7
Alt	(Kazakhstan) Timofey Skatov	7^{7}	6
(Italy) Gianluca Mager	6^{5}	2

Final
(Slovakia) Jozef Kovalík	5	7^{7}	4
Alt	(Kazakhstan) Timofey Skatov	7	6^{2}	6

=== Top half ===
First round
1	(Spain) R Carballés Baena	7^{7}	4	6
WC	(Italy) G Ferrari	6^{3}	6	2
(Italy) G Zeppieri	4	4
(Serbia) M Zekić	6	6
(Czech Republic) V Kopřiva	7^{9}	6
Q	(Spain) O Roca Batalla	6^{7}	1
(Czech Republic) Z Kolář	6	6
5	(Italy) F Passaro	4	2
3	(Argentina) TM Etcheverry	3	6	4
(Italy) A Vavassori	6	2	6
(Italy) S Travaglia	1	6	6
Q	(Ukraine) O Ovcharenko	6	1	3
(Italy) F Cobolli	6	7
Q	(Italy) Fausto Tabacco	4	5
(Slovakia) J Kovalík	6	6
7	(Italy) A Pellegrino	1	3

Second round
1	(Spain) R Carballés Baena	6	6
(Serbia) M Zekić	3	2
(Czech Republic) V Kopřiva	6	2	6
(Czech Republic) Z Kolář	3	6	3
(Italy) A Vavassori	6	4	6
(Italy) S Travaglia	2	6	1
(Italy) F Cobolli	7	3	2
(Slovakia) J Kovalík	5	6	6

Quarterfinals
1	(Spain) R Carballés Baena	5	0
(Czech Republic) V Kopřiva	7	6
(Italy) A Vavassori	3	6^{5}
(Slovakia) J Kovalík	6	7^{7}

Semifinals
(Czech Republic) V Kopřiva	3	5
(Slovakia) J Kovalík	6	7

=== Bottom half ===
First round
6	(Spain) C Taberner	6	6
Q	(Italy) F Forti	4	0
Q	(Italy) S Napolitano	5	3
Alt	(Kazakhstan) T Skatov	7	6
(Italy) R Bonadio	6^{5}	4
Q	(Hungary) M Valkusz	7^{7}	6
WC	(Italy) GM Moroni	6	3	6
LL	(Germany) Lucas Gerch	3	6	1
8	(Italy) M Cecchinato	7	4	3
(Italy) G Mager	5	6	6
(Italy) F Agamenone	6	3	4
WC	(Italy) F Arnaboldi	4	6	6
(Spain) N Sánchez Izquierdo	6	6
Alt	(Romania) ND Ionel	3	1
SE	(France) L Van Assche	2	6^{4}
2	(Serbia) D Lajović	6	7^{7}

Second round
6	(Spain) C Taberner	7^{7}	2	2
Alt	(Kazakhstan) T Skatov	6^{2}	6	6
Q	(Hungary) M Valkusz	6	4	7
WC	(Italy) GM Moroni	3	6	5
(Italy) G Mager	6	6
WC	(Italy) F Arnaboldi	2	3
(Spain) N Sánchez Izquierdo	1	3
2	(Serbia) D Lajović	6	6

Quarterfinals
Alt	(Kazakhstan) T Skatov	1	7	4
Q	(Hungary) M Valkusz	6	5	0^{r}
(Italy) G Mager	7^{7}	6
2	(Serbia) D Lajović	6^{3}	3

Semifinals
Alt	(Kazakhstan) T Skatov	7^{7}	6
(Italy) G Mager	6^{5}	2
