= 2022 Parma Challenger =

- Date: 3 – 9 October
- Edition: 1st
- Surface: Clay
- Location: Parma, Italy

Champions

Singles
- (Kazakhstan) Timofey Skatov

Doubles
- (Bosnia and Herzegovina) Tomislav Brkić / (Serbia) Nikola Ćaćić
Parma Challenger	· 2023 →

The 2022 Parma Challenger was a professional tennis tournament played on clay courts. It was the first edition of the tournament which was part of the 2022 ATP Challenger Tour. It took place in Parma, Italy between 3 and 9 October 2022.

== Singles main-draw entrants ==
=== Seeds ===
Country	Player	Rank^{1}	Seed
ESP	Roberto Carballés Baena	73	1
SRB	Dušan Lajović	86	2
ARG	Tomás Martín Etcheverry	87	3
~~ESP~~	~~Pablo Andújar~~	~~115~~	~~4~~
ITA	Francesco Passaro	122	5
ESP	Carlos Taberner	129	6
ITA	Andrea Pellegrino	136	7
ITA	Marco Cecchinato	137	8

- ^{1} Rankings are as of 26 September 2022.

=== Other entrants ===
The following players received wildcards into the singles main draw:

- (Italy) Federico Arnaboldi
- (Italy) Gianmarco Ferrari
- (Italy) Gian Marco Moroni

The following player received entry into the singles main draw as a special exempt:

- (France) Luca Van Assche

The following players received entry into the singles main draw as alternates:

- (Romania) Nicholas David Ionel
- (Kazakhstan) Timofey Skatov

The following players received entry from the qualifying draw:

- (Italy) Francesco Forti
- (Italy) Stefano Napolitano
- (Ukraine) Oleksandr Ovcharenko
- (Spain) Oriol Roca Batalla
- (Italy) Fausto Tabacco
- (Hungary) Máté Valkusz

The following player received entry as a lucky loser:

- (Germany) Lucas Gerch

== Champions ==
=== Singles ===
- (Kazakhstan) Timofey Skatov def. (Slovakia) Jozef Kovalík 7–5, 6–7^{(2–7)}, 6–4.

=== Doubles ===
- (Bosnia and Herzegovina) Tomislav Brkić / (Serbia) Nikola Ćaćić def. (Venezuela) Luis David Martínez / (Slovakia) Igor Zelenay 6–2, 6–2.
