= Parma Challenger =

ATP Challenger Tour
- Event name: Parma Challenger
- Location: Parma, Italy
- Category: ATP Challenger Tour
- Surface: Clay

The Parma Challenger is a professional tennis tournament played on clay courts. It is part of the Association of Tennis Professionals (ATP) Challenger Tour. It is held in Parma, Italy.

== Past finals ==
=== Singles ===
Year	Champion	Runner-up	Score
2022	(Kazakhstan) Timofey Skatov	(Slovakia) Jozef Kovalík	7–5, 6–7^{(2–7)}, 6–4

=== Doubles ===
Year	Champions	Runners-up	Score
2022	(Bosnia and Herzegovina) Tomislav Brkić (Serbia) Nikola Ćaćić	(Venezuela) Luis David Martínez (Slovakia) Igor Zelenay	6–2, 6–2

== See also ==
- Emilia-Romagna Open
- Internazionali di Tennis Città di Parma
