= Peđa Krstin =

Serbian tennis player

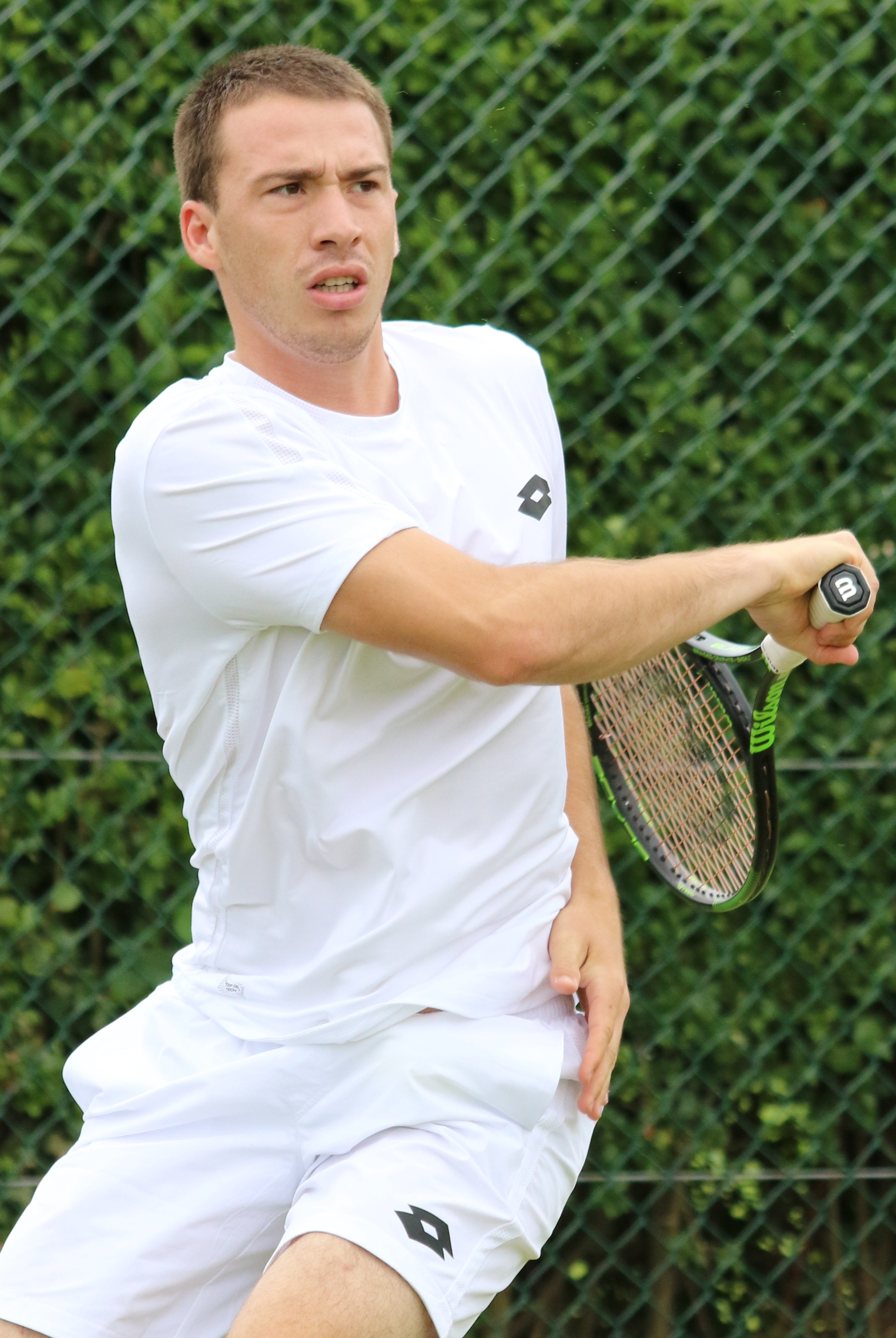
- Krstin at the 2016 Wimbledon Championships – Men's singles qualifying
- Country (sports): Serbia
- Residence: Pontiac, Michigan, Mokrin, Serbia
- Born: 3 September 1994 (age 31) Mokrin, Serbia, FR Yugoslavia
- Height: 1.83 m (6 ft 0 in)
- Turned pro: 2012
- Plays: Right-handed (two-handed backhand)
- Prize money: US $476,330

Singles
- Career record: 3–4
- Career titles: 0; 1 Challenger, 14 Futures
- Highest ranking: No. 159 (9 May 2016)

Grand Slam singles results
- Australian Open: Q3 (2020)
- French Open: Q2 (2016, 2018, 2019)
- Wimbledon: Q1 (2016, 2019)
- US Open: Q3 (2016)

Doubles
- Career record: 0–0
- Career titles: 0; 0 Challenger, 1 Futures
- Highest ranking: No. 554 (10 October 2015)

Team competitions
- Davis Cup: 2–0 (Sin. 2–0, Dbs. 0–0)
- Last updated on: 28 February 2025.

Peđa Krstin (Serbian Cyrillic: Пеђа Крстин; born 3 September 1994) is a Serbian professional tennis player and coach. Krstin has a career high ATP singles ranking of No. 159, which he achieved on 9 May 2016. He also achieved a career high ATP doubles ranking of No. 554 on 17 October 2015. He has won one Challenger and 14 Futures singles titles in his career.

He is currently a tennis Pro at Wessen Indoor Tennis Club in Pontiac, Michigan

== Career ==
Krstin made his ATP main draw debut at 2014 PBZ Zagreb Indoors after defeating Marcos Baghdatis, Gianluigi Quinzi and Martin Fischer in the qualifying rounds before losing to compatriot Dušan Lajović in the first round of the main draw.

Krstin was a fifth player on a Serbian Davis Cup team in the first round tie against Croatia in the 2015 Davis Cup, but didn't play in any match. He finally played his first match for the Davis Cup team against United States in the first round of 2018 Davis Cup, defeating world No. 50 Steve Johnson in two sets in a dead rubber.

He received a wildcard for 2021 Serbia Open and won his first round match against Korean Kwon Soon-woo, who was ranked No. 89, almost 200 places higher than Krstin was at that moment. This was his first ATP tour-level victory in four main-draw appearances.

== Grand Slam singles performance timeline ==
Key
W	F	SF	QF	#R	RR	Q#	DNQ	A	NH

(W) winner; (F) finalist; (SF) semifinalist; (QF) quarterfinalist; (#R) rounds 4, 3, 2, 1; (RR) round-robin stage; (Q#) qualification round; (DNQ) did not qualify; (A) absent; (NH) not held; (SR) strike rate (events won / competed); (W–L) win–loss record.
To avoid confusion and double counting, these charts are updated at the conclusion of a tournament or when the player's participation has ended.

Tournament	2014	2015	2016	2017	2018	2019	2020	2021	2022	2023	SR	W–L	Win %
Australian Open	A	Q1	Q1	Q2	Q2	Q2	Q3	A	A	A	0 / 0	0–0	–
French Open	A	A	Q2	A	Q2	Q2	A	A	A	A	0 / 0	0–0	–
Wimbledon	A	A	Q1	A	A	Q1	NH	A	A	A	0 / 0	0–0	–
US Open	Q1	A	Q3	A	Q1	Q1	A	A	A	A	0 / 0	0–0	–
Win–loss	0–0	0–0	0–0	0–0	0–0	0–0	0–0	0–0	0–0	0–0	0 / 0	0–0	–

== ATP Challenger Tour and ITF Futures finals ==
=== Singles: 27 (15 titles, 12 runner-ups) ===
Legend (singles) ATP Challenger Tour (1–4) ITF Futures Tour (14–8)	Titles by surface Hard (8–4) Clay (7–8)

Result	W–L	Date	Tournament	Tier	Surface	Opponent	Score
Win	1–0	May 2013	Kazakhstan F3, Shymkent	Futures	Clay	(Belarus) Sergey Betov	6–2, 6–1
Loss	1–1	Jun 2013	Bosnia and Herzegovina F1, Prijedor	Futures	Clay	(Bosnia and Herzegovina) Aldin Šetkić	6–7 ^{(4–6)}, 0–6
Loss	1–2	Jul 2013	Serbia F4, Belgrade	Futures	Clay	(France) Maxime Chazal	4–6, 3–6
Win	2–2	Aug 2013	Serbia F10, Novi Sad	Futures	Clay	(France) Martin Vaïsse	3–6, 6–4, 6–3
Loss	2–3	Sep 2013	Serbia F11, Zlatibor	Futures	Clay	(Serbia) Laslo Đere	6–7 ^{(0–6)}, 3–6
Loss	2–4	Dec 2013	Egypt F35, Sharm El Sheikh	Futures	Clay	(Egypt) Mohamed Safwat	4–6, 6–7 ^{(1–6)}
Win	3–4	Mar 2014	Iran F2, Kish Island	Futures	Clay	(Romania) Victor Crivoi	6–4, 6–1
Win	4–4	Apr 2014	Algeria F1, Oran	Futures	Clay	(France) Jordan Ubiergo	7–6 ^{(7–5)}, 6–1
Win	5–4	Apr 2014	Algeria F2, Algiers	Futures	Clay	(Italy) Matteo Marrai	6–7 ^{(8–10)}, 6–2, 6–2
Win	6–4	Jun 2014	Serbia F3, Šabac	Futures	Clay	(Chile) Nicolás Jarry	5–7, 6–4, 7–6 ^{(7–5)}
Win	7–4	Oct 2014	Turkey F35, Antalya	Futures	Hard	(Russia) Kirill Dmitriev	6–4, 7–5
Win	8–4	Apr 2015	Greece F2, Heraklion	Futures	Hard	(Serbia) Nikola Milojević	6–4, 7–6 ^{(7–3)}
Win	9–4	Jun 2015	Lebanon F1, Jounieh	Futures	Hard	(Slovakia) Adrian Sikora	6–2, 6–3
Loss	9–5	Sep 2015	Turkey F35, Antalya	Futures	Hard	(Japan) Hiroyasu Ehara	1–6, 0–4 Ret.
Win	10–5	Nov 2015	Venezuela F1, Maracaibo	Futures	Hard	(Venezuela) Luis David Martínez	6–2, 6–1
Win	11–5	Nov 2015	Venezuela F2, Maracay	Futures	Hard	(Argentina) Agustín Velotti	6–3, 6–3
Loss	11–6	Nov 2015	Venezuela F3, Margarita Island	Futures	Hard	(Barbados) Darian King	3–6, 0–1 Ret.
Loss	11–7	Mar 2016	Puebla, Mexico	Challenger	Hard	(Colombia) Eduardo Struvay	6–4, 4–6, 4–6
Win	12–7	Mar 2016	San Luis Potosí, Mexico	Challenger	Clay	(El Salvador) Marcelo Arévalo	6–4, 6–2
Loss	12–8	Apr 2017	Panama City, Panama	Challenger	Clay	(Brazil) Rogério Dutra Silva	2–6, 4–6
Win	13–8	May 2017	Nigeria F2, Abuja	Futures	Hard	(France) Calvin Hemery	6–2, 6–4
Loss	13–9	Jun 2017	Hungary F5, Budapest	Futures	Clay	(Portugal) Gonçalo Oliveira	2–6, 2–6
Loss	13–10	Oct 2017	Portugal F20, Oliveira de Azeméis	Futures	Hard	(Belgium) Yannick Mertens	6–3, 6–7 ^{(5–7)}, 2–6
Win	14–10	Oct 2017	Nigeria F4, Lagos	Futures	Hard	(Netherlands) Stephan Fransen	6–2, 6–3
Win	15–10	Oct 2017	Nigeria F5, Lagos	Futures	Hard	(France) Johan Tatlot	6–2, 4–6, 6–3
Loss	15–11	Jun 2018	Almaty, Kazakhstan	Challenger	Clay	(Austria) Jurij Rodionov	5–7, 2–6
Loss	15–12	Aug 2019	Meerbusch, Germany	Challenger	Clay	(Portugal) Pedro Sousa	6–7^{(4–7)}, 6–4, 3–6

=== Doubles: 3 (1 title, 2 runner-ups) ===
Legend (doubles) ATP Challenger Tour (0–1) ITF Futures (1–1)	Titles by surface Hard (0–0) Clay (1–2)

Result	Date	Tournament	Tier	Surface	Partner	Opponents	Score
Loss	Aug 2012	Serbia F10, Zlatibor	Futures	Clay	(Serbia) Miki Janković	(Serbia) Danilo Petrović (Serbia) Miljan Zekić	2–6, 6–4, [7–10]
Win	Nov 2013	Egypt F34, Sharm El Sheikh	Futures	Clay	(North Macedonia) Tomislav Jotovski	(France) Melik Feler (Burundi) Hassan Ndayishimiye	6–2, 6–3
Loss	May 2015	Samarkand, Uzbekistan	Challenger	Clay	(Serbia) Laslo Đere	(Belarus) Sergey Betov (Russia) Mikhail Elgin	4–6, 3–6
