= Timur Khabibulin =

Uzbekistani–Kazakhstani tennis player

- Country (sports): Kazakhstan (present); Uzbekistan
- Residence: Almaty, Kazakhstan
- Born: 2 August 1995 (age 31) Tashkent, Uzbekistan
- Height: 1.85 m (6 ft 1 in)
- Plays: Right-handed (two-handed backhand)
- Prize money: $ 79,935

Singles
- Career record: 0–0
- Career titles: 0; 0 Challenger, 0 Futures
- Highest ranking: No. 753 (9 May 2016)

Doubles
- Career record: 2–2
- Career titles: 0; 3 Challenger, 8 Futures
- Highest ranking: No. 154 (10 October 2018)
- Last updated on: 1 November 2023.

Timur Khabibulin (Tatar: Тимур Хәбибуллин, romanized: Timur Xäbibullin, born 2 August 1995) is an Uzbekistani–Kazakhstani former tennis player of Tatar descent. He is currently competing in padel.

Khabibulin had a career high ATP singles ranking of 753 achieved on 9 May 2016. He also had a career high doubles ranking of 154 achieved on 10 October 2018. Khabibulin won 3 ATP Challenger doubles titles.

Khabibulin was banned from professional tennis for life and fined $60,000 by the International Tennis Integrity Agency for 21 match fixing charges between 2014 and 2019.

== Tour titles ==
Legend
Grand Slam (0)
ATP Masters Series (0)
ATP Tour (0)
Challengers (3)

=== Doubles ===
Result	Date	Category	Tournament	Surface	Partner	Opponents	Score
Winner	25 November 2016	Challenger	Astana, Kazakhstan	Hard	(Kazakhstan) Aleksandr Nedovyesov	(Russia) Mikhail Elgin (Uzbekistan) Denis Istomin	7–6^{(9–7)}, 6–2
Winner	7 October 2017	Challenger	Almaty, Kazakhstan	Clay	(Kazakhstan) Aleksandr Nedovyesov	(Russia) Ivan Gakhov (Croatia) Nino Serdarušić	1–6, 6–3, [10–3]
Winner	11 May 2018	Challenger	Qarshi, Uzbekistan	Hard	(Ukraine) Vladyslav Manafov	(Uzbekistan) Sanjar Fayziev (Uzbekistan) Jurabek Karimov	6–2, 6–1
Loss	16 September 2018	Challenger	Istanbul, Turkey	Hard	(Ukraine) Vladyslav Manafov	(Australia) Rameez Junaid (India) Purav Raja	6–7^{(4–7)}, 6–4, [7–10]
Loss	6 October 2018	Challenger	Almaty, Kazakhstan	Hard	(Russia) Evgeny Karlovskiy	(Czech Republic) Zdeněk Kolář (Czech Republic) Lukáš Rosol	3–6, 1–6
