= Almaty Challenger =

- 2021 Almaty Challenger

Defunct tennis tournament
- Event name: Almaty Challenger
- Location: Almaty, Kazakhstan
- Venue: Gorky Tennis Park
- Category: ATP Challenger Tour
- Surface: Clay
- Draw: 32S/32Q/16D
- Prize money: $50,000 + H

The Almaty Challenger was a professional tennis tournament played on clay courts. It was part of the Association of Tennis Professionals (ATP) Challenger Tour. It was held annually in Almaty, Kazakhstan from 2017 until 2021.

== Past finals ==
=== Singles ===
Year	Champion	Runner-up	Score
2021 (2)	(Netherlands) Jesper de Jong	(Chile) Marcelo Tomás Barrios Vera	6–1, 6–2
2021 (1)	(Belgium) Zizou Bergs	(Kazakhstan) Timofey Skatov	4–6, 6–3, 6–2
2020	Not held		
2019	(Italy) Lorenzo Giustino	(Argentina) Federico Coria	6–4, 6–4
2018 (2)	(Uzbekistan) Denis Istomin	(Serbia) Nikola Milojević	6–7^{(4–7)}, 7–6^{(7–5)}, 6–2
2018 (1)	(Austria) Jurij Rodionov	(Serbia) Peđa Krstin	7–5, 6–2
2017	(Serbia) Filip Krajinović	(Serbia) Laslo Djere	6–0, 6–3

=== Doubles ===
Year	Champions	Runners-up	Score
2021 (2)	(Ukraine) Vladyslav Manafov (Ukraine) Vitaliy Sachko	(France) Corentin Denolly (Spain) Adrián Menéndez Maceiras	6–1, 6–4
2021 (1)	(Netherlands) Jesper de Jong (Ukraine) Vitaliy Sachko	(Ukraine) Vladyslav Manafov (Russia) Evgenii Tiurnev	7–6^{(7–4)}, 6–1
2020	Not held		
2019	(Slovakia) Andrej Martin (Chile) Hans Podlipnik Castillo	(Portugal) Gonçalo Oliveira (Belarus) Andrei Vasilevski	7–6^{(7–4)}, 3–6, [10–8]
2018 (2)	(Czech Republic) Zdeněk Kolář (Czech Republic) Lukáš Rosol	(Russia) Evgeny Karlovskiy (Kazakhstan) Timur Khabibulin	6–3, 6–1
2018 (1)	(Germany) Kevin Krawietz (Germany) Andreas Mies	(Lithuania) Laurynas Grigelis (Ukraine) Vladyslav Manafov	6–2, 7–6^{(7–2)}
2017	(Kazakhstan) Timur Khabibulin (Kazakhstan) Aleksandr Nedovyesov	(Russia) Ivan Gakhov (Croatia) Nino Serdarušić	1–6, 6–3, [10–3]

== See also ==
- 2021 ATP Challenger Tour
- Almaty Cup
