= Vladyslav Manafov =

Ukrainian tennis player

Vladyslav Manafov Владислав Манафов
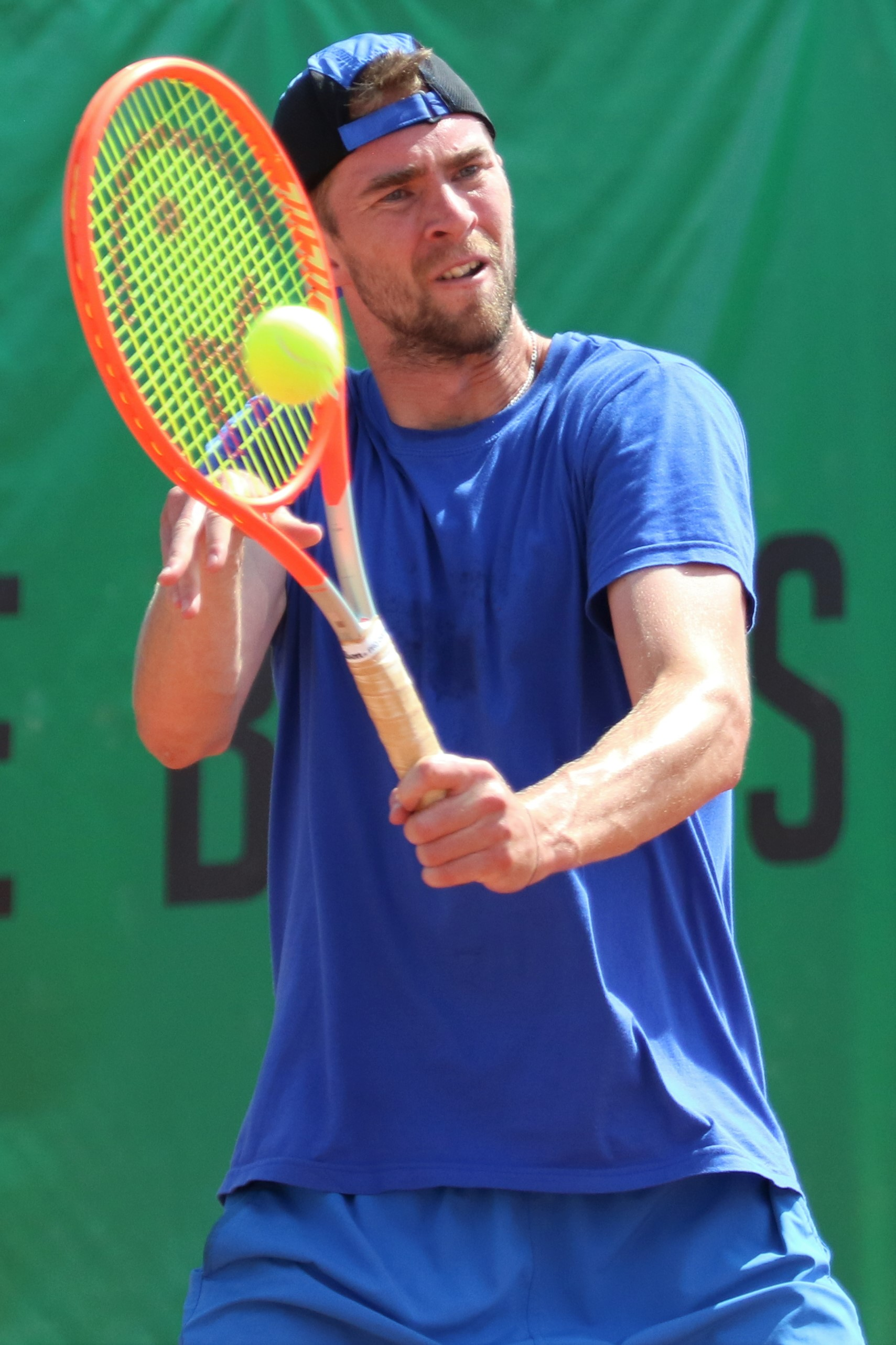
- Manafov at the 2022 Internationaux de Tennis de Blois
- Full name: Vladyslav Serhiyovych Manafov
- Country (sports): Ukraine
- Residence: Kyiv, Ukraine
- Born: 22 April 1993 (age 33) Kyiv, Ukraine
- Retired: June 2024 (last match played)
- Plays: Left-handed (two handed-backhand)
- Prize money: $227,016

Singles
- Career record: 1–2 (at ATP Tour level, Grand Slam level, and in Davis Cup)
- Career titles: 0
- Highest ranking: No. 327 (20 February 2017)

Doubles
- Career record: 2–0 (at ATP Tour level, Grand Slam level, and in Davis Cup)
- Career titles: 0
- Highest ranking: No. 93 (7 August 2023)

Vladyslav Serhiyovych Manafov (Ukrainian: Владислав Сергійович Манафов; born 22 April 1993 in Kyiv) is a Ukrainian inactive tennis player. Manafov has a career high ATP singles ranking of World No. 327 achieved on 20 February 2017. He also has a career high ATP doubles ranking of World No. 93 achieved on 7 August 2023.

== Career ==
Manafov has an ITF junior career high ranking of No. 16 achieved in February 2011 and reached the final of the 2011 US Open boys' doubles event with Maxim Dubarenco, losing to Robin Kern and Julian Lenz in the final, 5–7, 4–6.

Playing for Ukraine in Davis Cup, Manafov has a W/L record of 1–2.

== ATP Challenger and ITF Futures finals ==
=== Singles: 18 (8–10) ===
Legend ATP Challenger (0–0) ITF Futures (8–10)	Finals by surface Hard (4–5) Clay (3–5) Grass (0–0) Carpet (1–0)

Result	W–L	Date	Tournament	Tier	Surface	Opponent	Score
Win	1-0	Jul 2013	Egypt F16, Sharm El Sheikh	Futures	Clay	(Egypt) Ramy Kamal Aita	6–4, 6–4
Win	2-0	May 2014	Ukraine F4, Rivne	Futures	Clay	(Ukraine) Dmytro Badanov	6–2, 4–6, 7–5
Win	3-0	Jun 2014	Ukraine F7, Petrovske	Futures	Hard	(Spain) Jaime Pulgar-Garcia	6–4, 6–7^{(6–8)}, 6–4
Loss	3-1	Jun 2014	Ukraine F8, Petrovske	Futures	Hard	(Ukraine) Denys Molchanov	1–6, 0–2 ret.
Win	4-1	Mar 2015	Greece F1, Heraklion	Futures	Hard	(Czech Republic) Václav Šafránek	6–1, 4–6, 7–5
Loss	4-2	May 2015	Ukraine F1, Cherkasy	Futures	Clay	(Ukraine) Volodymyr Uzhylovskyi	6–4, 1–6, 4–6
Win	5-2	Jun 2015	Russia F3, Kazan	Futures	Clay	(Russia) Evgeny Elistratov	6–1, 6–2
Loss	5-3	Jul 2015	Romania F8, Pitești	Futures	Clay	(Italy) Claudio Fortuna	2–6, 4–6
Loss	5-4	Apr 2016	Greece F3, Heraklion	Futures	Hard	(Australia) Bradley Mousley	4–6, 3–6
Loss	5-5	May 2016	Ukraine F1, Cherkasy	Futures	Clay	(Belgium) Sander Gillé	4–6, 6–3, 4–6
Loss	5-6	May 2016	Ukraine F2, Cherkasy	Futures	Clay	(Poland) Kamil Majchrzak	2–6, 4–6
Win	6-6	Nov 2016	Egypt F33, Sharm El Sheikh	Futures	Hard	(Italy) Joy Vigani	6–2, 6–2
Win	7-6	Nov 2016	Egypt F34, Sharm El Sheikh	Futures	Hard	(France) Leny Mitjana	7–6^{(7–5)}, 1–1 ret.
Loss	7-7	Jan 2017	Kazakhstan F1, Aktobe	Futures	Hard	(Czech Republic) Václav Šafránek	6–7^{(5–7)} 6–7^{(2–7)}
Loss	7-8	Feb 2018	Egypt F3, Sharm El Sheikh	Futures	Hard	(Spain) Pedro Martínez	6–3, 3–6, 2–6
Win	8-8	Nov 2018	Estonia F2, Tartu	Futures	Carpet	(Latvia) Mārtiņš Podžus	7–5, 6–3
Loss	8-9	Nov 2018	Estonia F3, Pärnu	Futures	Hard	(Russia) Evgenii Tiurnev	6–4, 4–6, 3–6
Loss	8-10	Apr 2019	M25 Shymkent, Kazakhstan	World Tennis Tour	Clay	(Russia) Roman Safiullin	5–7, 3–6

=== Doubles: 106 (63–43) ===
Legend ATP Challenger (8–7) ITF Futures (55–36)	Finals by surface Hard (42–16) Clay (21–27) Grass (0–0) Carpet (0–0)

Result	W–L	Date	Tournament	Tier	Surface	Partner	Opponents	Score
Loss	0–1	Oct 2011	Turkey F28, Adana	Futures	Hard	(Poland) Maciej Smola	(Austria) Michael Linzer (Austria) Marco Mirnegg	4–6, 3–6
Win	1–1	Mar 2012	Ukraine F2, Cherkasy	Futures	Hard	(Ukraine) Volodymyr Uzhylovskyi	(Ukraine) Vladyslav Klymenko (Ukraine) Artem Smirnov	5–7, 6–4, [10–8]
Win	2–1	Mar 2012	Ukraine F3, Cherkasy	Futures	Hard	(Ukraine) Volodymyr Uzhylovskyi	(Ukraine) Denys Pume (Belarus) Yaraslav Shyla	6–4, 6–4
Win	3–1	Apr 2012	Uzbekistan F1, Namangan	Futures	Hard	(Belarus) Yaraslav Shyla	(Russia) Fedor Chervyakov (Kyrgyzstan) Daniiar Duldaev	6–3, 4–6, [10–4]
Loss	3–2	Apr 2012	Uzbekistan F2, Andijan	Futures	Hard	(Belarus) Yaraslav Shyla	(Belarus) Uladzimir Ignatik (Latvia) Deniss Pavlovs	4–6, 2–6
Loss	3–3	Jul 2012	Armenia F1, Yerevan	Futures	Clay	(Germany) Patrick Elias	(Moldova) Andrei Ciumac (Ukraine) Oleksandr Nedovyesov	3–6, 1–6
Loss	3–4	Jul 2012	Armenia F2, Yerevan	Futures	Clay	(Germany) Patrick Elias	(Moldova) Andrei Ciumac (Ukraine) Oleksandr Nedovyesov	4–6, 2–6
Win	4–4	Aug 2012	Turkey F30, İzmir	Futures	Clay	(Russia) Vitali Reshetnikov	(Sweden) Johan Backstrom (Sweden) Nima Madani	7–5, 6–1
Loss	4–5	Aug 2012	Turkey F31, İzmir	Futures	Clay	(Russia) Vitali Reshetnikov	(Italy) Alessandro Bega (Italy) Riccardo Sinicropi	4–6, 5–7
Win	5–5	Aug 2012	Turkey F32, İzmir	Futures	Clay	(Greece) Alexandros Jakupovic	(Italy) Alessandro Bega (Italy) Riccardo Sinicropi	6–4, 6–7^{(4–7)}, [12–10]
Win	6–5	Sep 2012	Georgia F1, Tbilisi	Futures	Clay	(Belarus) Yaraslav Shyla	(Estonia) Vladimir Ivanov (Russia) Ilia Shatskiy	6–1, 7–6^{(7–3)}
Win	7–5	Sep 2012	Georgia F2, Tbilisi	Futures	Clay	(Belarus) Yaraslav Shyla	(Georgia (country)) David Kvernadze (Georgia (country)) Nodar Itonishvili	6–2, 6–4
Loss	7–6	Nov 2012	Turkey F42, Antalya	Futures	Hard	(Moldova) Maxim Dubarenco	(Ukraine) Volodymyr Uzhylovskyi (Ukraine) Artem Smirnov	1–6, 6–7^{(3–7)}
Win	8–6	Feb 2013	Ukraine F1, Cherkasy	Futures	Hard	(Moldova) Maxim Dubarenco	(Ukraine) Volodymyr Uzhylovskyi (Ukraine) Artem Smirnov	6–3, 6–4
Win	9–6	Mar 2013	Ukraine F2, Cherkasy	Futures	Hard	(Moldova) Maxim Dubarenco	(Belgium) Joris de Loore (Belgium) Jeroen Vanneste	6–1, 6–4
Win	10–6	Mar 2013	Ukraine F3, Cherkasy	Futures	Hard	(Moldova) Maxim Dubarenco	(Ukraine) Volodymyr Uzhylovskyi (Ukraine) Artem Smirnov	6–3, 6–4
Loss	10–7	Jun 2013	Turkey F23, Manisa	Futures	Clay	(Switzerland) Luca Margaroli	(Ukraine) Gleb Alekseenko (Russia) Mikhail Biryukov	6–2, 6–7^{(4–7)}, [7–10]
Loss	10–8	Jul 2013	Egypt F17, Sharm El Sheikh	Futures	Clay	(Russia) Ilia Shatskiy	(Ukraine) Dmytro Kovalyov (Ukraine) Denys Mylokostov	6–7^{(3–7)}, 6–3, [3–10]
Loss	10–9	Oct 2013	Armenia F1, Yerevan	Futures	Clay	(Ukraine) Marat Deviatiarov	(Austria) Michael Linzer (Belgium) Yannik Reuter	6–7^{(6–8)}, 3–6
Loss	10–10	Dec 2013	Cyprus F3, Larnaca	Futures	Hard	(Bulgaria) Alexandar Lazov	(Romania) Alexandru-Daniel Carpen (Poland) Grzegorz Panfil	6–2, 1–6, [8–10]
Win	11–10	Mar 2014	Ukraine F1, Cherkasy	Futures	Hard	(Croatia) Filip Veger	(Latvia) Jānis Podžus (Latvia) Mārtiņš Podžus	6–2, 7–5
Loss	11–11	Mar 2014	Ukraine F2, Cherkasy	Futures	Hard	(Croatia) Filip Veger	(Ukraine) Volodymyr Uzhylovskyi (Ukraine) Artem Smirnov	4–6, 3–6
Win	12–11	Mar 2014	Ukraine F3, Cherkasy	Futures	Hard	(Croatia) Filip Veger	(Ukraine) Marat Deviatiarov (Germany) Pirmin Haenle	6–2, 6–3
Loss	12–12	Jun 2014	Ukraine F6, Rivne	Futures	Clay	(Russia) Ivan Nedelko	(Ukraine) Vadim Alekseenko (Ukraine) Stanislav Poplavskyy	1–6, 6–0, [3–10]
Win	13–12	Jun 2014	Ukraine F7, Petrovske	Futures	Hard	(Ukraine) Volodymyr Uzhylovskyi	(Ukraine) Marat Deviatiarov (Spain) Jaime Pulgar-Garcia	7–5, 6–2
Win	14–12	Jun 2014	Ukraine F8, Petrovske	Futures	Hard	(Ukraine) Volodymyr Uzhylovskyi	(France) Sebastien Boltz (France) Maxime Tchoutakian	7–5, 6–4
Win	15–12	Apr 2015	Greece F3, Heraklion	Futures	Hard	(Russia) Maxim Dubarenco	(Switzerland) Antoine Bellier (France) Hugo Grenier	6–1, 6–0
Loss	15–13	May 2015	Ukraine F2, Cherkasy	Futures	Clay	(Ukraine) Volodymyr Uzhylovskyi	(Ukraine) Marat Deviatiarov (France) Maxime Janvier	2–6, 2–6
Loss	15–14	Jun 2015	Russia F3, Kazan	Futures	Clay	(Netherlands) Mark Vervoort	(Russia) Mikhail Fufygin (Russia) Andrei Levine	6–7^{(3–7)}, 3–6
Win	16–14	Jun 2015	Russia F4, Kazan	Futures	Clay	(Russia) Maxim Dubarenco	(Ukraine) Volodymyr Uzhylovskyi (Russia) Daniil Medvedev	6–3, 4–6, [10–6]
Loss	16–15	Jul 2015	Romania F7, Focșani	Futures	Clay	(Russia) Maxim Dubarenco	(Italy) Claudio Fortuna (Lithuania) Laurynas Grigelis	2–6, 1–6
Loss	16–16	Aug 2015	Russia F5, Moscow	Futures	Clay	(Netherlands) Mark Vervoort	(Estonia) Vladimir Ivanov (Belarus) Andrei Vasilevski	2–6, 4–6
Win	17–16	Aug 2015	Russia F6, Moscow	Futures	Clay	(Russia) Anton Zaitcev	(Ukraine) Gleb Alekseenko (Russia) Alexander Perfilov	6–2, 6–4
Loss	17–17	Aug 2015	Germany F12, Karlsruhe	Futures	Clay	(Chile) Laslo Urrutia Fuentes	(Germany) Johannes Härteis (Germany) Hannes Wagner	6–7^{(5–7)}, 6–3, [5–10]
Win	18–17	Sep 2015	Egypt F30, Cairo	Futures	Clay	(France) Tak Khunn Wang	(Switzerland) Peter Lang (Austria) Robin Peham	6–1, 6–3
Loss	18–18	Oct 2015	Ukraine F5, Cherkasy	Futures	Clay	(Ukraine) Volodymyr Uzhylovskyi	(Ukraine) Marat Deviatiarov (Czech Republic) Libor Salaba	6–1, 4–6, [7–10]
Loss	18–19	Nov 2015	Egypt F39, Sharm El Sheikh	Futures	Hard	(Georgia (country)) George Tsivadze	(Czech Republic) Tomas Papik (Argentina) Santiago Fa Rodríguez Taverna	2–6, 5–7
Loss	18–20	Nov 2015	Egypt F40, Sharm El Sheikh	Futures	Hard	(Czech Republic) Libor Salaba	(Czech Republic) Marek Jaloviec (Czech Republic) Václav Šafránek	4–6, 6–3, [6–10]
Win	19–20	Nov 2015	Egypt F41, Sharm El Sheikh	Futures	Hard	(Georgia (country)) George Tsivadze	(Poland) Karol Drzewiecki (Poland) Maciej Smola	6–2, 6–3
Win	20–20	Apr 2016	Greece F4, Heraklion	Futures	Hard	(Australia) Bradley Mousley	(United Kingdom) Edward Corrie (United Kingdom) Lloyd Glasspool	6–2, 6–3
Loss	20–21	Apr 2016	Greece F5, Heraklion	Futures	Hard	(Australia) Bradley Mousley	(Poland) Karol Drzewiecki (Brazil) Bruno Sant'Anna	6–7^{(3–7)}, 6–2, [7–10]
Loss	20–22	May 2016	Ukraine F1, Cherkasy	Futures	Clay	(Switzerland) Antoine Bellier	(Belgium) Sander Gillé (Belgium) Joran Vliegen	3–6, 6–4, [9–11]
Win	21–22	Jun 2016	Romania F7, Bucharest	Futures	Clay	(Argentina) Juan Pablo Paz	(Argentina) Mariano Kestelboim (Romania) Petru-Alexandru Luncanu	4–6, 7–5, [10–4]
Loss	21–23	Jul 2016	Romania F10, Cluj-Napoca	Futures	Clay	(France) Ronan Joncour	(Romania) Victor-Mugurel Anagnastopol (Romania) Victor Vlad Cornea	4–6, 2–6
Win	22–23	Aug 2016	Romania F11, Pitești	Futures	Clay	(Romania) Patrick Grigoriu	(Romania) Vasile Antonescu (Romania) Alexandru Jecan	4–6, 7–5, [10–8]
Loss	22–24	Aug 2016	Romania F12, Iași	Futures	Clay	(Romania) Petru-Alexandru Luncanu	(Romania) Victor-Mugurel Anagnastopol (Romania) Victor Vlad Cornea	1–6, 6–3, [6–10]
Win	23–24	Oct 2016	Ukraine F6, Kyiv	Futures	Hard	(Lithuania) Lukas Mugevičius	(Ukraine) Marat Deviatiarov (Italy) Francesco Vilardo	6–2, 6–2
Win	24–24	Oct 2016	Egypt F30, Sharm El Sheikh	Futures	Hard	(Egypt) Karim-Mohamed Maamoun	(France) Benjamin Bonzi (United Kingdom) Jonathan Gray	6–4, 6–2
Win	25–24	Nov 2016	Egypt F31, Sharm El Sheikh	Futures	Hard	(Egypt) Karim-Mohamed Maamoun	(Ukraine) Yurii Dzhavakian (Kazakhstan) Denis Yevseyev	6–2, 6–3
Win	26–24	Nov 2016	Egypt F32, Sharm El Sheikh	Futures	Hard	(Ukraine) Daniil Zarichanskiy	(India) Shahbaaz Khan (Georgia (country)) George Tsivadze	6–4, 7–6^{(8–6)}
Win	27–24	Jan 2017	Kazakhstan F1, Aktobe	Futures	Hard	(Russia) Alexander Pavlioutchenkov	(Uzbekistan) Sanjar Fayziev (Kazakhstan) Timur Khabibulin	6–3, 7–6^{(9–7)}
Loss	27–25	Feb 2017	Kazakhstan F2, Aktobe	Futures	Hard	(Russia) Alexander Pavlioutchenkov	(Netherlands) Niels Lootsma (Netherlands) Botic van de Zandschulp	4–6, 4–6
Loss	27–26	Apr 2017	Egyt F12, Sharm El Sheikh	Futures	Hard	(Ukraine) Daniil Zarichanskiy	(Canada) Filip Peliwo (Bosnia and Herzegovina) Aldin Šetkić	6–4, 3–6, [12–14]
Loss	27–27	Apr 2017	Uzbekistan F1, Bukhara	Futures	Hard	(Belarus) Sergey Betov	(India) Sriram Balaji (India) Vishnu Vardhan	4–6, 5–7
Loss	27–28	Jun 2017	Uzbekistan F3, Andijan	Futures	Hard	(Russia) Denis Matsukevich	(India) Sriram Balaji (India) Vishnu Vardhan	3–6, 2–6
Win	28–28	Jun 2017	Uzbekistan F4, Namangan	Futures	Hard	(Russia) Denis Matsukevich	(Uzbekistan) Sanjar Fayziev (Kazakhstan) Timur Khabibulin	6–4, 6–7^{(7–9)}, [10–8]
Win	29–28	Aug 2017	Turkey F28, Erzurum	Futures	Hard	(Ukraine) Marat Deviatiarov	(Israel) Alon Elia (Israel) Igor Smilansky	5–7, 6–1, [10–5]
Win	30–28	Aug 2017	Belarus F1, Minsk	Futures	Hard	(Belarus) Yaraslav Shyla	(United Kingdom) Jonathan Gray (Croatia) Fran Zvonimir Zgombic	6–2, 7–5
Win	31–28	Aug 2017	Belarus F3, Minsk	Futures	Hard	(Belarus) Yaraslav Shyla	(Belarus) Ivan Liutarevich (Ukraine) Vadym Ursu	6–3, 2–6, [10–4]
Loss	31–29	Sep 2017	Ukraine F4, Kyiv	Futures	Clay	(Ukraine) Denys Molchanov	(Ukraine) Volodymyr Uzhylovskyi (Ukraine) Artem Smirnov	5–7, 2–6
Win	32–29	Sep 2017	Ukraine F5, Kremenchuk	Futures	Clay	(Ukraine) Denys Molchanov	(Ukraine) Dmytro Kamynin (Ukraine) Daniil Zarichanskiy	5–7, 6–4, [10–8]
Loss	32–30	Oct 2017	Kazakhstan F7, Shymkent	Futures	Clay	(Hungary) Gábor Borsos	(Spain) Enrique López Pérez (Argentina) Marco Trungelliti	2–6, 3–6
Win	33–30	Nov 2017	Egypt F32, Sharm El Sheikh	Futures	Hard	(Hungary) Gábor Borsos	(Ukraine) Olexiy Kolisnyk (Ukraine) Oleg Prihodko	7–6^{(7–2)}, 7–5
Win	34–30	Nov 2017	Egypt F33, Sharm El Sheikh	Futures	Hard	(Poland) Adrian Andrzejczuk	(Turkey) Tuna Altuna (Turkey) Cem İlkel	6–1, 6–0
Win	35–30	Nov 2017	Egypt F34, Sharm El Sheikh	Futures	Hard	(Spain) Roberto Ortega Olmedo	(Turkey) Tuna Altuna (Turkey) Cem İlkel	6–3, 6–4
Win	36–30	Nov 2017	Egypt F35, Sharm El Sheikh	Futures	Hard	(Spain) David Pérez Sanz	(Turkey) Tuna Altuna (Turkey) Cem İlkel	6–2, 6–3
Win	37–30	Feb 2018	Kazakhstan F2, Sharm El Sheikh	Futures	Hard	(Ukraine) Denys Molchanov	(Estonia) Vladimir Ivanov (Russia) Evgenii Tiurnev	7–6^{(7–4)}, 3–6, [10–6]
Win	38–30	Mar 2018	Egypt F10, Sharm El Sheikh	Futures	Hard	(Austria) Lucas Miedler	(Czech Republic) Petr Hájek (Brazil) Igor Marcondes	6–0, 6–2
Loss	38–31	Apr 2018	Egypt F12, Sharm El Sheikh	Futures	Hard	(Ukraine) Marat Deviatiarov	(Russia) Teymuraz Gabashvili (Austria) Lucas Miedler	4–6, 0–6
Win	39–31	May 2018	Karshi, Kazakhstan	Challenger	Hard	(Kazakhstan) Timur Khabibulin	(Uzbekistan) Sanjar Fayziev (Uzbekistan) Jurabek Karimov	6–2, 6–2
Loss	39–32	Jun 2018	Almaty, Kazakhstan	Challenger	Clay	(Lithuania) Laurynas Grigelis	(Germany) Kevin Krawietz (Germany) Andreas Mies	2–6, 6–7^{(2–7)}
Loss	39–33	Sep 2018	Istanbul, Turkey	Challenger	Hard	(Kazakhstan) Timur Khabibulin	(Australia) Rameez Junaid (India) Purav Raja	6–7^{(4–7)}, 6–4, [7–10]
Win	40–33	Dec 2018	Egypt F31, Sharm El Sheikh	Futures	Clay	(Lebanon) Giovani Samaha	(Switzerland) Louroi Martinez (Brazil) Damien Wenger	6–3, 6–4
Win	41–33	Feb 2019	M15 Sharm El Sheikh, Egypt	World Tennis Tour	Clay	(Belgium) Michael Geerts	(Zimbabwe) Benjamin Lock (Zimbabwe) Courtney John Lock	6–3, 7–6^{(12–10)}
Win	42–33	Apr 2019	M25 Shymkent, Kazakhstan	World Tennis Tour	Clay	(Uzbekistan) Sanjar Fayziev	(Russia) Yan Bondarevskiy (Belarus) Ivan Liutarevich	6–2, 6–1
Win	43–33	Apr 2019	M25 Andijan, Uzbekistan	World Tennis Tour	Hard	(Kazakhstan) Timur Khabibulin	(Belarus) Markos Kalovelonis (Kazakhstan) Grigoriy Lomakin	7–5, 6–1
Win	44–33	Aug 2019	M25+H Bydgoszcz, Poland	World Tennis Tour	Clay	(Austria) David Pichler	(Australia) Adam Taylor (Australia) Jason Taylor	6–3, 6–4
Win	45–33	Sep 2019	M25 Irpin, Ukraine	World Tennis Tour	Clay	(Kazakhstan) Denis Yevseyev	(Uzbekistan) Sergey Fomin (Uzbekistan) Jurabek Karimov	7–6^{(7–5)}, 5–7, [10–6]
Loss	45–34	Sep 2019	M15 Shymkent, Kazakhstan	World Tennis Tour	Clay	(Kazakhstan) Timur Khabibulin	(Russia) Alexander Igoshin (Russia) Alexey Zakharov	4–6, 2–6
Loss	45–35	Sep 2019	M15 Shymkent, Kazakhstan	World Tennis Tour	Clay	(Kazakhstan) Timur Khabibulin	(Russia) Vladimir Korolev (Russia) Andrey Uvarov	6–3, 6–7^{(7–9)}, [3–10]
Win	46–35	Sep 2019	M25 Almaty, Kazakhstan	World Tennis Tour	Hard	(Belarus) Ivan Liutarevich	(Kazakhstan) Grigoriy Lomakin (Georgia (country)) George Tsivadze	7–5, 6–2
Win	47–35	Nov 2019	M15 Sharm El Sheikh, Egypt	World Tennis Tour	Hard	(Lithuania) Laurynas Grigelis	(Czech Republic) Marek Gengel (Czech Republic) Tomas Papik	6–2, 7–5
Win	48–35	Feb 2020	M25 Aktobe, Kazakhstan	World Tennis Tour	Hard	(Belarus) Ivan Liutarevich	(Estonia) Vladimir Ivanov (Russia) Maxim Ratniuk	7–5, 7–6^{(7–5)}
Win	49–35	Mar 2020	M15 Sharm El Sheikh, Egypt	World Tennis Tour	Hard	(Austria) David Pichler	(Ukraine) Oleg Khotkov (Ukraine) Volodymyr Uzhylovskyi	6–1, 3–6, [10–7]
Win	50–35	Oct 2020	M15 Sharm El Sheikh, Egypt	World Tennis Tour	Hard	(Ukraine) Vitaliy Sachko	(Ukraine) Yurii Dzhavakian (Latvia) Mārtiņš Podžus	6–3, 6–3
Win	51–35	Oct 2020	M15 Sharm El Sheikh, Egypt	World Tennis Tour	Hard	(India) Arjun Kadhe	(Russia) Ivan Gakhov (Ukraine) Georgii Kravchenko	6–3, 6–4
Win	52–35	Nov 2020	M15 Sharm El Sheikh, Egypt	World Tennis Tour	Hard	(India) Arjun Kadhe	(Ukraine) Vladyslav Orlov (Italy) Francesco Vilardo	6–1, 6–3
Win	53–35	Nov 2020	M15 Sharm El Sheikh, Egypt	World Tennis Tour	Hard	(Belarus) Yaraslav Shyla	(Belgium) Arnaud Bovy (Belgium) Gauthier Onclin	4–6, 6–4, [10–7]
Loss	53–36	Apr 2021	M15 Aktobe, Kazakhstan	World Tennis Tour	Clay	(Belarus) Ivan Liutarevich	(Belarus) Yaraslav Shyla (Russia) Aleksei Khomich	5–7, 6–3, [6–10]
Loss	53–37	Apr 2021	M15 Shymkent, Kazakhstan	World Tennis Tour	Clay	(Belarus) Ivan Liutarevich	(Russia) Ivan Gakhov (Russia) Ivan Denisov	6–3, 5–7, [5–10]
Loss	53–38	Jun 2021	Almaty, Kazakhstan	Challenger	Clay	(Russia) Evgenii Tiurnev	(Netherlands) Jesper de Jong (Ukraine) Vitaliy Sachko	6–7^{(4–7)}, 1–6
Win	54–38	Jun 2021	Almaty II, Kazakhstan	Challenger	Clay	(Ukraine) Vitaliy Sachko	(France) Corentin Denolly (Spain) Adrián Menéndez Maceiras	6–1, 6–4
Loss	54–39	Jul 2021	M25 Nur-Sultan, Kazakhstan	World Tennis Tour	Hard	(Ukraine) Oleksii Krutykh	(Uzbekistan) Sanjar Fayziev (Greece) Markos Kalovelonis	6–7^{(1–7)}, 3–6
Loss	54–40	Aug 2021	Warsaw, Poland	Challenger	Clay	(Poland) Piotr Matuszewski	(Mexico) Hans Hach (Mexico) Miguel Ángel Reyes-Varela	4–6, 4–6
Win	55–40	Sep 2021	M15 Chornomorsk, Ukraine	World Tennis Tour	Clay	(Kazakhstan) Grigoriy Lomakin	(Russia) Yan Bondarevskiy (Ukraine) Oleg Prihodko	7–6^{(7–5)}, 4–6, [10–8]
Win	56–40	Feb 2022	M25 Nur-Sultan, Kazakhstan	World Tennis Tour	Hard	Ivan Liutarevich	Petr Bar Biryukov; Evgeny Karlovskiy	6–3, 6–7^{(1–7)}, [11–9]
Win	57–40	Mar 2022	M25 Nur-Sultan, Kazakhstan	World Tennis Tour	Hard	Ivan Liutarevich	(Kazakhstan) Timur Khabibulin (Kazakhstan) Beibit Zhukayev	6–4, 6–0
Loss	57–41	June 2022	Bratislava, Slovakia	Challenger	Clay	(Ukraine) Oleg Prihodko	(India) Sriram Balaji (India) Jeevan Nedunchezhiyan	6–7^{(6–8)}, 4–6
Win	58–41	Jul 2022	San Benedetto del Tronto, Italy	Challenger	Clay	(Ukraine) Oleg Prihodko	(Hungary) Fábián Marozsán (Czech Republic) Lukáš Rosol	4–6, 6–3, [12–10]
Win	59–41	Aug 2022	Banja Luka, Bosnia and Herzegovina	Challenger	Clay	(Ukraine) Oleg Prihodko	(Germany) Fabian Fallert (Germany) Hendrik Jebens	6–3, 6–4
Loss	59–42	Sep 2022	Lisbon, Portugal	Challenger	Clay	(Ukraine) Oleg Prihodko	(Czech Republic) Zdeněk Kolář (Portugal) Gonçalo Oliveira	1–6, 6–7^{(4–7)}
Win	60–42	Feb 2023	Vilnius, Lithuania	Challenger	Hard (i)	Ivan Liutarevich	(India) Arjun Kadhe (Germany) Daniel Masur	6–0, 6–2
Win	61–42	Feb 2023	Cherbourg, France	Challenger	Hard (i)	Ivan Liutarevich	(Poland) Karol Drzewiecki (Poland) Kacper Żuk	7–6^{(12–10)}, 7–6^{(9–7)}
Loss	61–43	Feb 2023	Rovereto, Italy	Challenger	Hard (i)	(Ukraine) Oleg Prihodko	(Romania) Victor Vlad Cornea (Croatia) Franko Škugor	7–6^{(7–3)}, 2–6, [4–10]
Win	62–43	Apr 2023	Madrid, Spain	Challenger	Clay	Ivan Liutarevich	(Finland) Patrik Niklas-Salminen (Netherlands) Bart Stevens	6–4, 6–4
Win	63–43	May 2024	Vicenza, Italy	Challenger	Clay	(Finland) Patrik Niklas-Salminen	(Germany) Andre Begemann (India) Niki Kaliyanda Poonacha	6–3, 6–4

== Junior Grand Slam finals ==
=== Doubles: 1 (1 runner-up) ===
Outcome	Year	Tournament	Surface	Partner	Opponents	Score
Loss	2011	US Open	Hard	(Moldova) Maxim Dubarenco	(Germany) Robin Kern (Germany) Julian Lenz	5–7, 4–6
