= Timofey Skatov =

Kazakhstani tennis player

Timofey Skatov Тимофей Скатов
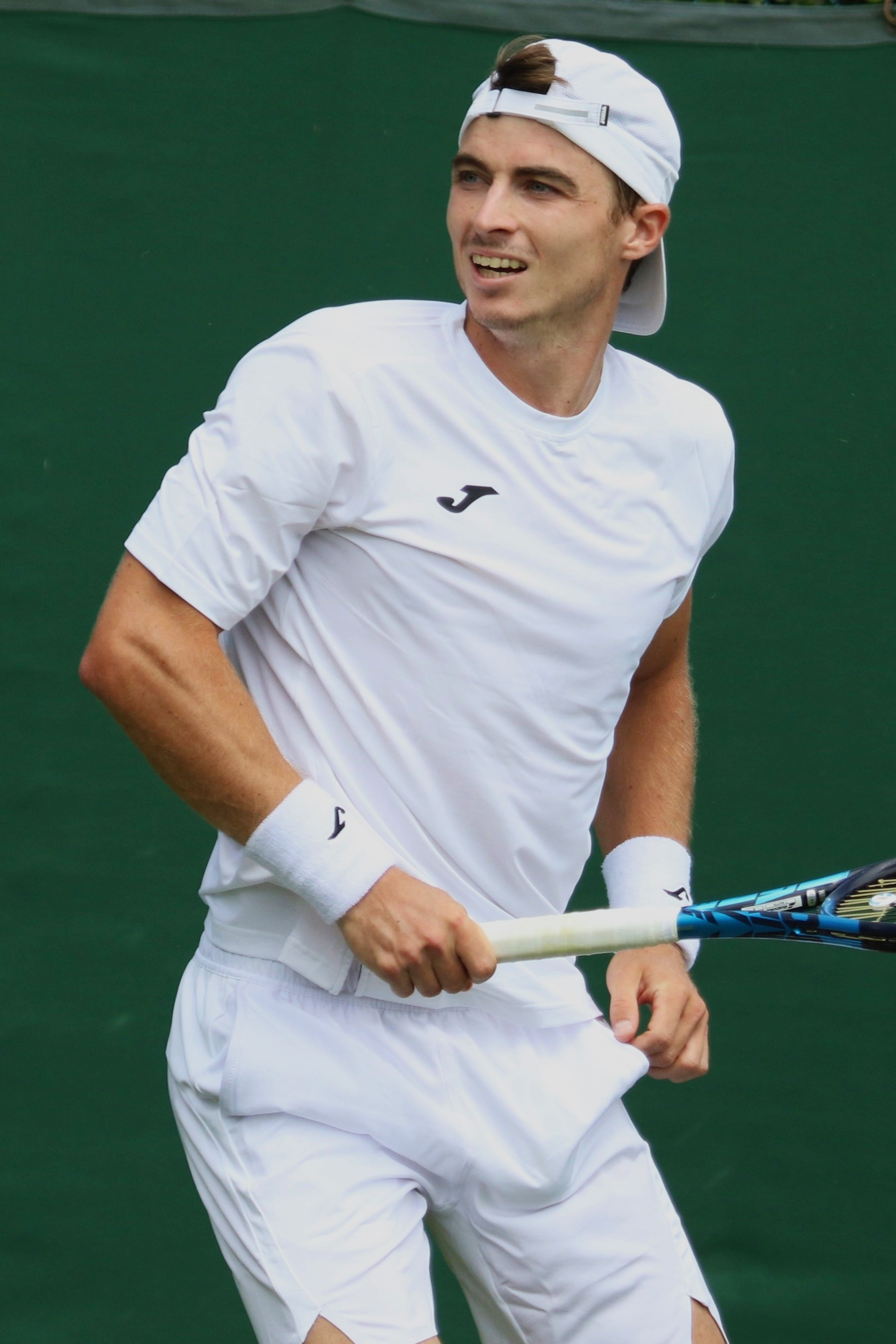
- Skatov at the 2023 Wimbledon Championships
- Full name: Timofey Dmitriyevich Skatov
- Country (sports): Russia (2015–18); Kazakhstan (2018–)
- Residence: Valencia, Spain
- Born: 21 January 2001 (age 25) Petropavl, Kazakhstan
- Height: 1.75 m (5 ft 9 in)
- Turned pro: 2019
- Plays: Right-handed (two-handed backhand)
- Coach: Johan Örtegren
- Prize money: US $1,024,548

Singles
- Career record: 9–14
- Career titles: 0
- Highest ranking: No. 123 (11 September 2023)
- Current ranking: No. 175 (8 June 2026)

Grand Slam singles results
- Australian Open: 1R (2022)
- French Open: 1R (2023)
- Wimbledon: Q3 (2024, 2026)
- US Open: 1R (2023, 2024)

Doubles
- Career record: 2–4
- Career titles: 0
- Highest ranking: No. 627 (17 July 2023)
- Last updated on: 15 June 2026.

Timofey Dmitriyevich Skatov (Russian: Тимофей Дмитриевич Скатов; born 21 January 2001) is a Kazakh tennis player. He has a career-high ATP singles ranking of World No. 123, achieved on 11 September 2023 and No. 627 in doubles, achieved on 17 July 2023. Skatov had a career-high ITF junior combined ranking of No. 1 achieved on 1 January 2018. He is the current No. 3 Kazakhstani player.

== Professional career ==
=== 2020–21: ATP debut & first win, First Challenger final, Top 250 ===
Skatov made his ATP debut at the 2020 Astana Open in Nur-Sultan as a wildcard where he lost to Emil Ruusuvuori.

In June 2021, he reached his first Challenger final as a wildcard in Almaty where he lost to Zizou Bergs.

He won his first ATP match also as a wildcard at the 2021 Astana Open in Kazakhstan defeating Andreas Seppi.

=== 2022: Major and top 150 debuts, Maiden Challenger title ===
Skatov made his first Grand Slam main draw appearance after successfully making it all the way through in the 2022 Australian Open qualifications, defeating Hugo Grenier, Dane Sweeny, and Gastão Elias. He lost in the first round to Slovak qualifier Norbert Gombos.

He won his second Challenger title as an alternate at the 2022 Parma Challenger. As a result, he moved 57 positions up and reached a new career-high just outside the top 150 at No. 152 on 10 October 2022.

=== 2023–24: Third Challenger final, Top 125 debut ===
He reached the top 125 on 13 February 2023 after making the Concepción final in January, losing against Federico Coria.

He made his 2023 French Open main draw debut after defeating Gabriel Diallo, Otto Virtanen and Felipe Meligeni Alves, where he lost against Grigor Dimitrov in the first round. He also made his debut at the 2023 US Open defeating twelfth seed James Duckworth in the last round of the qualifying competition. He lost to another Australian Alex de Minaur in the first round in four sets.

In May 2024, he won his second Challenger title at the 2024 Schwaben Open with a win over Elmer Møller and returned to the top 200 in the rankings at No. 199 on 27 May 2024. Ranked No. 189, he qualified for the main draw of the 2024 US Open for a second consecutive year, but lost to Hubert Hurkacz in the first round.

== Personal life ==
Skatov was born in Petropavl, Kazakhstan to Russian parents, and moved to Tula, Russia at the age of 1. He represented Russia internationally from 2015 to 2018. In May 2018, Skatov switched nationalities to represent his birth country. He lives in Valencia and has been training at the Lozano Altur Tennis Academy in Valencia since 2017.

== Performance timeline ==
Key
W	F	SF	QF	#R	RR	Q#	DNQ	A	NH

(W) winner; (F) finalist; (SF) semifinalist; (QF) quarterfinalist; (#R) rounds 4, 3, 2, 1; (RR) round-robin stage; (Q#) qualification round; (DNQ) did not qualify; (A) absent; (NH) not held; (SR) strike rate (events won / competed); (W–L) win–loss record.
To avoid confusion and double counting, these charts are updated at the conclusion of a tournament or when the player's participation has ended.

Current through the 2025 Wimbledon Championships

Tournament	2022	2023	2024	2025	2026	SR	W–L	Win %
Grand Slam
Australian Open	1R	Q2	Q1	Q1	A	0 / 1	0–1	0%
French Open	Q2	1R	A	Q2		0 / 1	0–1	0%
Wimbledon	A	Q1	Q3	Q2		0 / 0	0–0	–
US Open	A	1R	1R	A		0 / 2	0–2	0%
Win–loss	0–1	0–2	0–1	0–0		0 / 4	0–4	0%
Year-end ranking	146	222	192	241		$997,286		

== ATP Challenger Tour finals ==
=== Singles: 9 (3 titles, 6 runner-ups) ===
Legend ATP Challenger Tour (3–6)

Result	W–L	Date	Tournament	Tier	Surface	Opponent	Score
Loss	0–1	Jun 2021	Almaty, Kazakhstan	Challenger	Clay	(Belgium) Zizou Bergs	6–4, 3–6, 2–6
Win	1–1	Oct 2022	Parma, Italy	Challenger	Clay	(Slovakia) Jozef Kovalík	7–5, 6–7^{(2–7)}, 6–4
Loss	1–2	Jan 2023	Concepción, Chile	Challenger	Clay	(Argentina) Federico Coria	4–6, 3–6
Win	2–2	May 2024	Augsburg, Germany	Challenger	Clay	(Denmark) Elmer Møller	3–6, 7–5, 6–3
Loss	2–3	Jul 2024	Troyes, France	Challenger	Clay	(France) Gabriel Debru	3–6, 7–6^{(7–1)}, 5–7
Loss	2–4	Aug 2025	Bonn, Germany	Challenger	Clay	(Austria) Jurij Rodionov	6–3, 2–6, 4–6
Win	3–4	Aug 2025	Todi, Italy	Challenger	Clay	(Italy) Stefano Travaglia	7–6^{(7–4)}, 0–6, 6–2
Loss	3–5	Jan 2026	Bengaluru, India	Challenger	Hard	(Spain) Pedro Martínez	6–7^{(5–7)}, 3–6
Loss	3–6	Apr 2026	Shymkent, Kazakhstan	Challenger	Clay	(Uzbekistan) Sergey Fomin	3–6, 5–7

== ITF World Tennis Tour finals ==
=== Singles: 5 (3 titles, 2 runner-ups) ===
Legend ITF WTT (3–2)

Result	W–L	Date	Tournament	Tier	Surface	Opponent	Score
Loss	0–1	Jul 2019	M25 Dénia, Spain	WTT	Clay	(Spain) Carlos Alcaraz	4–6, 3–6
Loss	0–2	Sep 2019	M15 Melilla, Spain	WTT	Clay	(Spain) Ricardo Ojeda Lara	5–7, 4–6
Win	1–2	Jan 2020	M15 Antalya, Turkey	WTT	Clay	(Serbia) Miljan Zekić	6–3, 4–6, 6–3
Win	2–2	Sep 2020	M15 Bucharest, Romania	WTT	Clay	(Italy) Franco Agamenone	6–4, 6–4
Win	3–2	Sep 2020	M15 Melilla, Spain	WTT	Clay	(Denmark) Holger Rune	3–6, 6–0, 6–1
