= 2018 ITF Men's Circuit (January–March) =

The 2018 ITF Men's Circuit is the 2018 edition of the second-tier tour for men's professional tennis. It is organised by the International Tennis Federation and is a tier below the ATP Tour. The ITF Men's Circuit includes tournaments with prize money ranging from $15,000 up to $25,000.

== Key ==
$25,000 tournaments
$15,000 tournaments

== Month ==
=== January ===
Week of	Tournament	Winner	Runners-up	Semifinalists	Quarterfinalists
January 1	USA F1 Futures; Los Angeles, United States; Hard $25,000; Singles and doubles draws	(Brazil) Karue Sell; 6–7^{(5–7)}, 6–2, 6–2	(United States) Christopher Eubanks	(Japan) Kaichi Uchida (Czech Republic) Jan Šátral	(United States) Alexander Sarkissian (France) Florian Lakat (United States) Alex Rybakov (United States) Alexander Lebedev
January 1	USA F1 Futures; Los Angeles, United States; Hard $25,000; Singles and doubles draws	(United States) Martin Redlicki (Brazil) Karue Sell; 6–4, 6–3	(United Kingdom) Luke Bambridge (Mexico) Hans Hach Verdugo	(Japan) Kaichi Uchida (Czech Republic) Jan Šátral	(United States) Alexander Sarkissian (France) Florian Lakat (United States) Alex Rybakov (United States) Alexander Lebedev
January 1	Hong Kong F6 Futures; Hong Kong; Hard $15,000; Singles and doubles draws	(Italy) Matteo Viola; 3–6, 6–2, 7–6^{(7–5)}	(Finland) Harri Heliövaara	(Japan) Shintaro Imai (Vietnam) Lý Hoàng Nam	(Japan) Takuto Niki (Finland) Emil Ruusuvuori (France) Fabien Reboul (United States) Jack Murray
January 1	Hong Kong F6 Futures; Hong Kong; Hard $15,000; Singles and doubles draws	(Japan) Yuto Sakai (Japan) Yunosuke Tanaka; 2–6, 6–3, [10–4]	(Japan) Shintaro Imai (Japan) Takuto Niki	(Japan) Shintaro Imai (Vietnam) Lý Hoàng Nam	(Japan) Takuto Niki (Finland) Emil Ruusuvuori (France) Fabien Reboul (United States) Jack Murray
January 8	USA F2 Futures; Long Beach, United States; Hard $25,000; Singles and doubles draws	(United States) Collin Altamirano; 6–1, 7–5	(Ecuador) Emilio Gómez	(United States) JC Aragone (Japan) Kaichi Uchida	(United States) Austin Krajicek (Czech Republic) Jan Šátral (Israel) Daniel Cukierman (United States) Alex Rybakov
January 8	USA F2 Futures; Long Beach, United States; Hard $25,000; Singles and doubles draws	(United Kingdom) Luke Bambridge (Mexico) Hans Hach Verdugo; 6–3, 6–2	(United States) Collin Altamirano (United States) Alexander Lebedev	(United States) JC Aragone (Japan) Kaichi Uchida	(United States) Austin Krajicek (Czech Republic) Jan Šátral (Israel) Daniel Cukierman (United States) Alex Rybakov
January 8	China F1 Futures; Anning, China; Clay $15,000; Singles and doubles draws	(Japan) Yuta Shimizu; 6–7^{(7–9)}, 6–1, 6–2	(China) Wang Huixin	(France) Florent Diep (Japan) Shinji Hazawa	(China) Bai Yan (Chinese Taipei) Lee Kuan-yi (Japan) Ryota Tanuma (Latvia) Mārtiņš Podžus
January 8	China F1 Futures; Anning, China; Clay $15,000; Singles and doubles draws	(China) Te Rigele (China) Wang Aoran; 7–5, 7–6^{(7–3)}	(Japan) Shinji Hazawa (Japan) Yuta Shimizu	(France) Florent Diep (Japan) Shinji Hazawa	(China) Bai Yan (Chinese Taipei) Lee Kuan-yi (Japan) Ryota Tanuma (Latvia) Mārtiņš Podžus
January 8	France F1 Futures; Bagnoles-de-l'Orne, France; Clay (indoor) $15,000+H; Singles and doubles draws	(France) Grégoire Barrère; 6–4, 7–5	(Netherlands) Boy Westerhof	(France) Laurent Rochette (France) Grégoire Jacq	(France) Constant Lestienne (France) Alexis Musialek (Belgium) Niels Desein (Russia) Alen Avidzba
January 8	France F1 Futures; Bagnoles-de-l'Orne, France; Clay (indoor) $15,000+H; Singles and doubles draws	(Belgium) Niels Desein (Netherlands) Boy Westerhof; 4–6, 6–3, [10–8]	(Monaco) Romain Arneodo (France) Grégoire Jacq	(France) Laurent Rochette (France) Grégoire Jacq	(France) Constant Lestienne (France) Alexis Musialek (Belgium) Niels Desein (Russia) Alen Avidzba
January 8	Germany F1 Futures; Schwieberdingen, Germany; Carpet (indoor) $15,000; Singles and doubles draws	(Germany) Daniel Masur; 6–2, 7–5	(Germany) Kevin Krawietz	(Germany) Tobias Simon (Belgium) Maxime Authom	(Slovakia) Patrik Néma (Germany) Christoph Negritu (Switzerland) Adrian Bodmer (Germany) Elmar Ejupovic
January 8	Germany F1 Futures; Schwieberdingen, Germany; Carpet (indoor) $15,000; Singles and doubles draws	(Germany) Kevin Krawietz (Germany) Daniel Masur; 4–6, 6–2, [10–2]	(France) Sébastien Boltz (Germany) Kai Wehnelt	(Germany) Tobias Simon (Belgium) Maxime Authom	(Slovakia) Patrik Néma (Germany) Christoph Negritu (Switzerland) Adrian Bodmer (Germany) Elmar Ejupovic
January 8	Tunisia F1 Futures; Hammamet, Tunisia; Clay $15,000; Singles and doubles draws	(Spain) Sergio Gutiérrez Ferrol; 4–6, 6–3, 4–0 ret.	(Germany) Jeremy Jahn	(Spain) Jordi Samper Montaña (North Macedonia) Tomislav Jotovski	(Serbia) Miljan Zekić (Spain) Javier Barranco Cosano (Spain) Sergi Pérez Contri (Hungary) Péter Nagy
January 8	Tunisia F1 Futures; Hammamet, Tunisia; Clay $15,000; Singles and doubles draws	(Italy) Marco Bortolotti (Italy) Julian Ocleppo; 1–0 ret.	(Japan) Shunsuke Wakita (Serbia) Miljan Zekić	(Spain) Jordi Samper Montaña (North Macedonia) Tomislav Jotovski	(Serbia) Miljan Zekić (Spain) Javier Barranco Cosano (Spain) Sergi Pérez Contri (Hungary) Péter Nagy
January 8	Turkey F1 Futures; Antalya, Turkey; Hard $15,000; Singles and doubles draws	(Italy) Gianluigi Quinzi; 3–6, 6–3, 6–3	(Germany) Marc Sieber	(United Kingdom) Ryan James Storrie (Turkey) Altuğ Çelikbilek	(Belgium) Kimmer Coppejans (United Kingdom) Jonathan Gray (Croatia) Mate Delić (Romania) Nicolae Frunză
January 8	Turkey F1 Futures; Antalya, Turkey; Hard $15,000; Singles and doubles draws	(Turkey) Altuğ Çelikbilek (Germany) Jakob Sude; 7–6^{(7–4)}, 2–6, [10–4]	(Czech Republic) Michal Konečný (Czech Republic) Patrik Rikl	(United Kingdom) Ryan James Storrie (Turkey) Altuğ Çelikbilek	(Belgium) Kimmer Coppejans (United Kingdom) Jonathan Gray (Croatia) Mate Delić (Romania) Nicolae Frunză
January 8	USA F3 Futures; Naples, United States; Clay $15,000; Singles and doubles draws	(Spain) Javier Martí; 6–4, 6–0	(Germany) Louis Wessels	(United States) Strong Kirchheimer (Portugal) Fred Gil	(United States) Jesse Witten (Venezuela) Ricardo Rodríguez (Spain) Miguel Semmler (United States) Raleigh Smith
January 8	USA F3 Futures; Naples, United States; Clay $15,000; Singles and doubles draws	(United States) Trent Bryde (Germany) Louis Wessels; 6–1, 1–6, [11–9]	(Portugal) Fred Gil (Spain) Jaume Pla Malfeito	(United States) Strong Kirchheimer (Portugal) Fred Gil	(United States) Jesse Witten (Venezuela) Ricardo Rodríguez (Spain) Miguel Semmler (United States) Raleigh Smith
January 15	China F2 Futures; Anning, China; Clay $15,000; Singles and doubles draws	(Chinese Taipei) Yang Tsung-hua; 6–3, 3–6, 7–6^{(7–4)}	(Canada) Steven Diez	(Chinese Taipei) Lee Kuan-yi (India) Arjun Kadhe	(Serbia) Goran Marković (China) Bai Yan (India) Nitin Kumar Sinha (Russia) Ivan Nedelko
January 15	China F2 Futures; Anning, China; Clay $15,000; Singles and doubles draws	(China) Wang Ruikai (China) Wang Ruixuan; 6–3, 2–6, [10–4]	(China) Cui Jie (China) Wang Huixin	(Chinese Taipei) Lee Kuan-yi (India) Arjun Kadhe	(Serbia) Goran Marković (China) Bai Yan (India) Nitin Kumar Sinha (Russia) Ivan Nedelko
January 15	Egypt F1 Futures; Sharm El Sheikh, Egypt; Hard $15,000; Singles and doubles draws	(Russia) Aslan Karatsev; 6–1, 6–2	(Belgium) Yannick Mertens	(Belgium) Romain Barbosa (Japan) Hiroki Moriya	(Czech Republic) David Poljak (Belgium) Omar Salman (Italy) Roberto Marcora (Ukraine) Artem Smirnov
January 15	Egypt F1 Futures; Sharm El Sheikh, Egypt; Hard $15,000; Singles and doubles draws	(Netherlands) Thiemo de Bakker (Belgium) Yannick Mertens; 7–5, 6–2	(Italy) Roberto Marcora (Ukraine) Artem Smirnov	(Belgium) Romain Barbosa (Japan) Hiroki Moriya	(Czech Republic) David Poljak (Belgium) Omar Salman (Italy) Roberto Marcora (Ukraine) Artem Smirnov
January 15	France F2 Futures; Bressuire, France; Hard (indoor) $15,000+H; Singles and doubles draws	(France) Grégoire Barrère; 6–3, 6–7^{(6–8)}, 7–6^{(7–5)}	(France) Albano Olivetti	(France) Matteo Martineau (France) Rémi Boutillier	(France) Hugo Voljacques (France) Sadio Doumbia (France) Fabien Reboul (France) Ugo Humbert
January 15	France F2 Futures; Bressuire, France; Hard (indoor) $15,000+H; Singles and doubles draws	(France) Sadio Doumbia (France) Fabien Reboul; 6–3, 7–5	(France) Sébastien Boltz (Italy) Erik Crepaldi	(France) Matteo Martineau (France) Rémi Boutillier	(France) Hugo Voljacques (France) Sadio Doumbia (France) Fabien Reboul (France) Ugo Humbert
January 15	Spain F1 Futures; Manacor, Spain; Clay $15,000; Singles and doubles draws	(Russia) Evgenii Tiurnev; 6–4, 6–0	(Spain) Daniel Muñoz de la Nava	(South Korea) Chung Yun-seong (Spain) Daniel Gimeno Traver	(Spain) Pablo Irigaray Guarne (Belgium) Germain Gigounon (Italy) Claudio Fortuna (Spain) Bernabé Zapata Miralles
January 15	Spain F1 Futures; Manacor, Spain; Clay $15,000; Singles and doubles draws	(Belgium) Germain Gigounon (Belgium) Jeroen Vanneste; 6–1, 6–1	(Ukraine) Vladyslav Orlov (Switzerland) Alexander Ritschard	(South Korea) Chung Yun-seong (Spain) Daniel Gimeno Traver	(Spain) Pablo Irigaray Guarne (Belgium) Germain Gigounon (Italy) Claudio Fortuna (Spain) Bernabé Zapata Miralles
January 15	Tunisia F2 Futures; Hammamet, Tunisia; Clay $15,000; Singles and doubles draws	(Spain) Jordi Samper Montaña; 3–6, 6–2, 6–3	(Spain) Sergio Gutiérrez Ferrol	(Italy) Edoardo Eremin (Hungary) Péter Nagy	(Germany) Jeremy Jahn (Italy) Walter Trusendi (Italy) Nicolò Turchetti (Spain) Alberto Romero de Ávila Senise
January 15	Tunisia F2 Futures; Hammamet, Tunisia; Clay $15,000; Singles and doubles draws	(Italy) Cristian Carli (Italy) Nicolò Turchetti; 6–0, 6–2	(Russia) Yan Bondarevskiy (Spain) Sergio Gutiérrez Ferrol	(Italy) Edoardo Eremin (Hungary) Péter Nagy	(Germany) Jeremy Jahn (Italy) Walter Trusendi (Italy) Nicolò Turchetti (Spain) Alberto Romero de Ávila Senise
January 15	Turkey F2 Futures; Antalya, Turkey; Hard $15,000; Singles and doubles draws	(Belgium) Zizou Bergs; 6–3, 6–4	(Bulgaria) Dimitar Kuzmanov	(Italy) Gianluca Mager (Germany) Marc Sieber	(Belgium) Kimmer Coppejans (France) Antoine Escoffier (Serbia) Milan Drinić (Italy) Gianluigi Quinzi
January 15	Turkey F2 Futures; Antalya, Turkey; Hard $15,000; Singles and doubles draws	(Russia) Mikhail Fufygin (Russia) Alexander Pavlioutchenkov; 6–7^{(4–7)}, 6–3, [10–7]	(France) Antoine Escoffier (Croatia) Fran Zvonimir Zgombić	(Italy) Gianluca Mager (Germany) Marc Sieber	(Belgium) Kimmer Coppejans (France) Antoine Escoffier (Serbia) Milan Drinić (Italy) Gianluigi Quinzi
January 15	USA F4 Futures; Sunrise, United States; Clay $15,000; Singles and doubles draws	(Belgium) Julien Cagnina; 6–7^{(5–7)}, 6–3, 6–3	(Japan) Naoki Nakagawa	(Chile) Marcelo Tomás Barrios Vera (Brazil) Pedro Sakamoto	(France) Maxime Chazal (Ecuador) Gonzalo Escobar (Dominican Republic) Roberto Cid Subervi (Portugal) Fred Gil
January 15	USA F4 Futures; Sunrise, United States; Clay $15,000; Singles and doubles draws	(Belgium) Julien Cagnina (France) Maxime Chazal; 1–6, 7–5, [10–4]	(Colombia) Juan Manuel Benítez Chavarriaga (United States) Junior Alexander Ore	(Chile) Marcelo Tomás Barrios Vera (Brazil) Pedro Sakamoto	(France) Maxime Chazal (Ecuador) Gonzalo Escobar (Dominican Republic) Roberto Cid Subervi (Portugal) Fred Gil
January 22	Germany F2 Futures; Nußloch, Germany; Carpet (indoor) $25,000; Singles and doubles draws	(France) Sadio Doumbia; 7–6^{(7–3)}, 7–5	(Belgium) Christopher Heyman	(Germany) Jan Choinski (Germany) Robin Kern	(Netherlands) Botic van de Zandschulp (Germany) Daniel Masur (Germany) Dominik Böhler (Argentina) Pedro Cachin
January 22	Germany F2 Futures; Nußloch, Germany; Carpet (indoor) $25,000; Singles and doubles draws	(Germany) Kevin Krawietz (South Africa) Ruan Roelofse; 6–3, 6–3	(Argentina) Pedro Cachin (Germany) Daniel Masur	(Germany) Jan Choinski (Germany) Robin Kern	(Netherlands) Botic van de Zandschulp (Germany) Daniel Masur (Germany) Dominik Böhler (Argentina) Pedro Cachin
January 22	China F3 Futures; Anning, China; Clay $15,000; Singles and doubles draws	(Chinese Taipei) Yang Tsung-hua; 6–4, 6–7^{(5–7)}, 6–1	(Chinese Taipei) Lee Kuan-yi	(India) Manish Sureshkumar (Russia) Ivan Nedelko	(India) Nitin Kumar Sinha (India) Arjun Kadhe (France) Florent Diep (Japan) Issei Okamura
January 22	China F3 Futures; Anning, China; Clay $15,000; Singles and doubles draws	(India) Arjun Kadhe (India) Lakshit Sood; 6–3, 7–6^{(7–4)}	(France) Florent Diep (Serbia) Goran Marković	(India) Manish Sureshkumar (Russia) Ivan Nedelko	(India) Nitin Kumar Sinha (India) Arjun Kadhe (France) Florent Diep (Japan) Issei Okamura
January 22	Egypt F2 Futures; Sharm El Sheikh, Egypt; Hard $15,000; Singles and doubles draws	(Russia) Aslan Karatsev; 6–3, 6–2	(Ukraine) Artem Smirnov	(Netherlands) Thiemo de Bakker (France) Enzo Couacaud	(Egypt) Karim-Mohamed Maamoun (Belgium) Romain Barbosa (Italy) Roberto Marcora (Egypt) Youssef Hossam
January 22	Egypt F2 Futures; Sharm El Sheikh, Egypt; Hard $15,000; Singles and doubles draws	(Netherlands) Thiemo de Bakker (Netherlands) Michiel de Krom; 6–3, 6–4	(Tunisia) Moez Echargui (Tunisia) Anis Ghorbel	(Netherlands) Thiemo de Bakker (France) Enzo Couacaud	(Egypt) Karim-Mohamed Maamoun (Belgium) Romain Barbosa (Italy) Roberto Marcora (Egypt) Youssef Hossam
January 22	France F3 Futures; Veigy-Foncenex, France; Carpet (indoor) $15,000; Singles and doubles draws	(Italy) Alessandro Bega; 4–6, 6–4, 7–6^{(9–7)}	(Netherlands) Antal van der Duim	(France) Albano Olivetti (France) Hugo Grenier	(Italy) Matteo Viola (France) Baptiste Crepatte (France) Axel Michon (Belgium) Clément Geens
January 22	France F3 Futures; Veigy-Foncenex, France; Carpet (indoor) $15,000; Singles and doubles draws	(France) Dan Added (France) Albano Olivetti; 2–6, 7–6^{(7–4)}, [10–8]	(Netherlands) Antal van der Duim (Netherlands) Tim van Terheijden	(France) Albano Olivetti (France) Hugo Grenier	(Italy) Matteo Viola (France) Baptiste Crepatte (France) Axel Michon (Belgium) Clément Geens
January 22	Spain F2 Futures; Manacor, Spain; Clay $15,000; Singles and doubles draws	(Spain) Daniel Muñoz de la Nava; 6–4, 5–7, 6–3	(Italy) Lorenzo Giustino	(South Korea) Chung Yun-seong (Russia) Ivan Gakhov	(Portugal) João Monteiro (Italy) Jacopo Stefanini (France) Alexis Musialek (Spain) Daniel Gimeno Traver
January 22	Spain F2 Futures; Manacor, Spain; Clay $15,000; Singles and doubles draws	(Italy) Lorenzo Giustino (Spain) David Vega Hernández; 7–5, 7–5	(Italy) Pietro Rondoni (Italy) Jacopo Stefanini	(South Korea) Chung Yun-seong (Russia) Ivan Gakhov	(Portugal) João Monteiro (Italy) Jacopo Stefanini (France) Alexis Musialek (Spain) Daniel Gimeno Traver
January 22	Tunisia F3 Futures; Hammamet, Tunisia; Clay $15,000; Singles and doubles draws	(Spain) Sergio Gutiérrez Ferrol; 6–4, 2–6, 6–2	(Spain) Jordi Samper Montaña	(Spain) Oriol Roca Batalla (Montenegro) Ljubomir Čelebić	(Italy) Nicolò Turchetti (Morocco) Lamine Ouahab (Spain) Pol Toledo Bagué (Romania) Dragoș Dima
January 22	Tunisia F3 Futures; Hammamet, Tunisia; Clay $15,000; Singles and doubles draws	(Italy) Cristian Carli (Italy) Nicolò Turchetti; 5–7, 6–2, [10–7]	(Bosnia and Herzegovina) Darko Bojanović (Italy) Giuseppe Tresca	(Spain) Oriol Roca Batalla (Montenegro) Ljubomir Čelebić	(Italy) Nicolò Turchetti (Morocco) Lamine Ouahab (Spain) Pol Toledo Bagué (Romania) Dragoș Dima
January 22	Turkey F3 Futures; Antalya, Turkey; Hard $15,000; Singles and doubles draws	(Bulgaria) Dimitar Kuzmanov; 6–3, 6–4	(Croatia) Mate Delić	(Czech Republic) Václav Šafránek (South Korea) Kim Cheong-eui	(Turkey) Altuğ Çelikbilek (Germany) Marc Sieber (Russia) Maxim Ratniuk (France) Tak Khunn Wang
January 22	Turkey F3 Futures; Antalya, Turkey; Hard $15,000; Singles and doubles draws	(Russia) Timur Kiyamov (Russia) Alexander Pavlioutchenkov; 6–2, 6–1	(Zimbabwe) Benjamin Lock (Slovenia) Nik Razboršek	(Czech Republic) Václav Šafránek (South Korea) Kim Cheong-eui	(Turkey) Altuğ Çelikbilek (Germany) Marc Sieber (Russia) Maxim Ratniuk (France) Tak Khunn Wang
January 22	USA F5 Futures; Weston, United States; Clay $15,000; Singles and doubles draws	(Chile) Marcelo Tomás Barrios Vera; 6–2, 6–0	(Portugal) Fred Gil	(Ecuador) Emilio Gómez (Dominican Republic) Roberto Cid Subervi	(Spain) Javier Martí (Ecuador) Gonzalo Escobar (Brazil) Pedro Sakamoto (Spain) Jaume Pla Malfeito
January 22	USA F5 Futures; Weston, United States; Clay $15,000; Singles and doubles draws	(France) Maxime Chazal (Portugal) Fred Gil; 6–4, 6–3	(Colombia) José Daniel Bendeck (Colombia) Alejandro Gómez	(Ecuador) Emilio Gómez (Dominican Republic) Roberto Cid Subervi	(Spain) Javier Martí (Ecuador) Gonzalo Escobar (Brazil) Pedro Sakamoto (Spain) Jaume Pla Malfeito
January 29	Egypt F3 Futures; Sharm El Sheikh, Egypt; Hard $15,000; Singles and doubles draws	(Spain) Pedro Martínez; 3–6, 6–3, 6–2	(Ukraine) Vladyslav Manafov	(Japan) Hiroyasu Ehara (Czech Republic) Marek Gengel	(France) Johan Tatlot (Austria) Alexander Erler (Spain) Pablo Vivero González (Czech Republic) David Poljak
January 29	Egypt F3 Futures; Sharm El Sheikh, Egypt; Hard $15,000; Singles and doubles draws	(Spain) Pedro Martínez (Belgium) Omar Salman; 6–4, 6–7^{(5–7)}, [10–5]	(France) Maxence Brovillé (France) Johan Tatlot	(Japan) Hiroyasu Ehara (Czech Republic) Marek Gengel	(France) Johan Tatlot (Austria) Alexander Erler (Spain) Pablo Vivero González (Czech Republic) David Poljak
January 29	Germany F3 Futures; Kaarst, Germany; Carpet (indoor) $15,000; Singles and doubles draws	(Netherlands) Igor Sijsling; 6–2, 7–6^{(7–2)}	(Germany) Marvin Möller	(Netherlands) Botic van de Zandschulp (France) Sébastien Boltz	(France) Mick Lescure (Netherlands) Boy Westerhof (Germany) Peter Torebko (Germany) Robin Kern
January 29	Germany F3 Futures; Kaarst, Germany; Carpet (indoor) $15,000; Singles and doubles draws	(France) Rémi Boutillier (France) Hugo Voljacques; 6–1, 6–2	(Germany) Kai Lemstra (Germany) Christoph Negritu	(Netherlands) Botic van de Zandschulp (France) Sébastien Boltz	(France) Mick Lescure (Netherlands) Boy Westerhof (Germany) Peter Torebko (Germany) Robin Kern
January 29	Great Britain F1 Futures; Glasgow, Great Britain; Hard (indoor) $15,000; Singles and doubles draws	(Netherlands) Scott Griekspoor; 6–1, 7–6^{(7–5)}	(Belgium) Yannick Mertens	(Belgium) Zizou Bergs (Italy) Matteo Viola	(Austria) Maximilian Neuchrist (United Kingdom) Lloyd Glasspool (United Kingdom) Neil Pauffley (United Kingdom) Marcus Willis
January 29	Great Britain F1 Futures; Glasgow, Great Britain; Hard (indoor) $15,000; Singles and doubles draws	(Austria) Matthias Haim (Germany) Jakob Sude; 6–3, 6–7^{(5–7)}, [10–6]	(United Kingdom) Neil Pauffley (United Kingdom) Marcus Willis	(Belgium) Zizou Bergs (Italy) Matteo Viola	(Austria) Maximilian Neuchrist (United Kingdom) Lloyd Glasspool (United Kingdom) Neil Pauffley (United Kingdom) Marcus Willis
January 29	Spain F3 Futures; Peguera, Spain; Clay $15,000; Singles and doubles draws	(Spain) Daniel Gimeno Traver; 3–6, 6–2, 6–1	(Spain) Javier Barranco Cosano	(Italy) Lorenzo Giustino (Germany) Pascal Meis	(Spain) Pol Toledo Bagué (Spain) Eduard Esteve Lobato (Italy) Raúl Brancaccio (Spain) Albert Alcaraz Ivorra
January 29	Spain F3 Futures; Peguera, Spain; Clay $15,000; Singles and doubles draws	(South Korea) Chung Yun-seong (Japan) Rio Noguchi; 2–6, 7–6^{(8–6)}, [10–8]	(Brazil) Bruno Sant'Anna (Spain) David Vega Hernández	(Italy) Lorenzo Giustino (Germany) Pascal Meis	(Spain) Pol Toledo Bagué (Spain) Eduard Esteve Lobato (Italy) Raúl Brancaccio (Spain) Albert Alcaraz Ivorra
January 29	Tunisia F4 Futures; Djerba, Tunisia; Hard $15,000; Singles and doubles draws	(France) Laurent Lokoli; 6–2, 6–1	(France) Geoffrey Blancaneaux	(France) Jonathan Kanar (Czech Republic) Michal Konečný	(France) Lény Mitjana (Belgium) Clément Geens (Spain) Mario Vilella Martínez (Spain) Roberto Ortega Olmedo
January 29	Tunisia F4 Futures; Djerba, Tunisia; Hard $15,000; Singles and doubles draws	(France) Jonathan Kanar (France) Laurent Lokoli; 7–5, 6–0	(Brazil) Eduardo Russi Assumpção (Spain) Mario Vilella Martínez	(France) Jonathan Kanar (Czech Republic) Michal Konečný	(France) Lény Mitjana (Belgium) Clément Geens (Spain) Mario Vilella Martínez (Spain) Roberto Ortega Olmedo
January 29	Turkey F4 Futures; Antalya, Turkey; Clay $15,000; Singles and doubles draws	(Spain) Enrique López Pérez; 6–2, 6–3	(Romania) Dragoș Dima	(Italy) Flavio Cipolla (Russia) Ivan Nedelko	(Czech Republic) Pavel Nejedlý (Croatia) Nino Serdarušić (South Korea) Son Ji-hoon (Ukraine) Nikita Mashtakov
January 29	Turkey F4 Futures; Antalya, Turkey; Clay $15,000; Singles and doubles draws	(Austria) Pascal Brunner (Croatia) Nino Serdarušić; 6–3, 6–2	(Italy) Flavio Cipolla (Spain) Enrique López Pérez	(Italy) Flavio Cipolla (Russia) Ivan Nedelko	(Czech Republic) Pavel Nejedlý (Croatia) Nino Serdarušić (South Korea) Son Ji-hoon (Ukraine) Nikita Mashtakov
January 29	USA F6 Futures; Palm Coast, United States; Clay $15,000; Singles and doubles draws	(Netherlands) Tim van Rijthoven; 6–4, 6–4	(France) Maxime Chazal	(Portugal) Fred Gil (United States) Strong Kirchheimer	(Colombia) Alejandro Gómez (Spain) Jaume Pla Malfeito (France) Florian Lakat (United States) Junior Alexander Ore
January 29	USA F6 Futures; Palm Coast, United States; Clay $15,000; Singles and doubles draws	(Sweden) Filip Bergevi (France) Florian Lakat; 6–4, 6–1	(France) Maxime Chazal (Portugal) Fred Gil	(Portugal) Fred Gil (United States) Strong Kirchheimer	(Colombia) Alejandro Gómez (Spain) Jaume Pla Malfeito (France) Florian Lakat (United States) Junior Alexander Ore

=== February ===
Week of	Tournament	Winner	Runners-up	Semifinalists	Quarterfinalists
February 5	Switzerland F1 Futures; Oberentfelden, Switzerland; Carpet (indoor) $25,000; Singles and doubles draws	(Germany) Tobias Simon; 6–4, 7–5	(Switzerland) Jakub Paul	(France) Grégoire Jacq (France) Maxime Tchoutakian	(Germany) Valentin Günther (Germany) Julian Lenz (Switzerland) Marc-Andrea Hüsler (Germany) Sami Reinwein
February 5	Switzerland F1 Futures; Oberentfelden, Switzerland; Carpet (indoor) $25,000; Singles and doubles draws	(Switzerland) Marc-Andrea Hüsler (Switzerland) Jakub Paul; 4–6, 7–6^{(9–7)}, [10–8]	(Czech Republic) Jan Mertl (Czech Republic) Michael Vrbenský	(France) Grégoire Jacq (France) Maxime Tchoutakian	(Germany) Valentin Günther (Germany) Julian Lenz (Switzerland) Marc-Andrea Hüsler (Germany) Sami Reinwein
February 5	Egypt F4 Futures; Sharm El Sheikh, Egypt; Hard $15,000; Singles and doubles draws	(Italy) Gianluigi Quinzi; 6–2, 6–4	(Czech Republic) Jaroslav Pospíšil	(Spain) Pedro Martínez (Czech Republic) David Poljak	(Belgium) Romain Barbosa (United States) Maksim Tikhomirov (Germany) Christian Hirschmüller (Russia) Ronald Slobodchikov
February 5	Egypt F4 Futures; Sharm El Sheikh, Egypt; Hard $15,000; Singles and doubles draws	(Italy) Julian Ocleppo (Italy) Andrea Vavassori; 7–5, 6–4	(Czech Republic) Marek Gengel (Czech Republic) David Poljak	(Spain) Pedro Martínez (Czech Republic) David Poljak	(Belgium) Romain Barbosa (United States) Maksim Tikhomirov (Germany) Christian Hirschmüller (Russia) Ronald Slobodchikov
February 5	Great Britain F2 Futures; Loughborough, Great Britain; Hard (indoor) $15,000; Singles and doubles draws	(Finland) Harri Heliövaara; 7–6^{(7–2)}, 6–4	(Belgium) Maxime Authom	(France) Corentin Denolly (Austria) Maximilian Neuchrist	(Austria) Matthias Haim (France) Grégoire Barrère (Denmark) Frederik Nielsen (United States) Ronnie Schneider
February 5	Great Britain F2 Futures; Loughborough, Great Britain; Hard (indoor) $15,000; Singles and doubles draws	(Finland) Harri Heliövaara (Denmark) Frederik Nielsen; 6–4, 6–1	(United Kingdom) Jack Findel-Hawkins (United Kingdom) Luke Johnson	(France) Corentin Denolly (Austria) Maximilian Neuchrist	(Austria) Matthias Haim (France) Grégoire Barrère (Denmark) Frederik Nielsen (United States) Ronnie Schneider
February 5	Spain F4 Futures; Peguera, Spain; Clay $15,000; Singles and doubles draws	(Spain) Sergio Gutiérrez Ferrol; 6–4, 6–3	(Spain) Daniel Gimeno Traver	(Netherlands) Guy den Heijer (Italy) Gian Marco Moroni	(Russia) Ivan Gakhov (Israel) Yshai Oliel (Spain) Marc Giner (Italy) Edoardo Eremin
February 5	Spain F4 Futures; Peguera, Spain; Clay $15,000; Singles and doubles draws	(Spain) Sergio Martos Gornés (Netherlands) Mark Vervoort; 7–5, 3–6, [10–5]	(Spain) Pablo Schelcher Muro (Spain) Pedro Vives Marcos	(Netherlands) Guy den Heijer (Italy) Gian Marco Moroni	(Russia) Ivan Gakhov (Israel) Yshai Oliel (Spain) Marc Giner (Italy) Edoardo Eremin
February 5	Tunisia F5 Futures; Djerba, Tunisia; Hard $15,000; Singles and doubles draws	(Spain) Carlos Boluda-Purkiss; 3–6, 7–6^{(7–1)}, 7–5	(Italy) Roberto Marcora	(France) David Guez (France) Laurent Lokoli	(Italy) Filippo Leonardi (Argentina) Mariano Kestelboim (Czech Republic) Michal Konečný (Belgium) Clément Geens
February 5	Tunisia F5 Futures; Djerba, Tunisia; Hard $15,000; Singles and doubles draws	(Brazil) Caio Silva (Brazil) Thales Turini; 6–4, 2–6, [10–6]	(United States) Mousheg Hovhannisyan (Czech Republic) Michal Konečný	(France) David Guez (France) Laurent Lokoli	(Italy) Filippo Leonardi (Argentina) Mariano Kestelboim (Czech Republic) Michal Konečný (Belgium) Clément Geens
February 5	Turkey F5 Futures; Antalya, Turkey; Clay $15,000; Singles and doubles draws	(Spain) Enrique López Pérez; 6–3, 6–3	(Croatia) Nino Serdarušić	(Italy) Flavio Cipolla (Italy) Alessandro Petrone	(Russia) Mikhail Korovin (Austria) Pascal Brunner (United States) Collin Altamirano (Italy) Fabrizio Ornago
February 5	Turkey F5 Futures; Antalya, Turkey; Clay $15,000; Singles and doubles draws	(Italy) Flavio Cipolla (Spain) Enrique López Pérez; 7–5, 6–2	(Romania) Vasile Antonescu (Romania) Patrick Grigoriu	(Italy) Flavio Cipolla (Italy) Alessandro Petrone	(Russia) Mikhail Korovin (Austria) Pascal Brunner (United States) Collin Altamirano (Italy) Fabrizio Ornago
February 12	Great Britain F3 Futures; Shrewsbury, Great Britain; Hard (indoor) $25,000; Singles and doubles draws	(France) Fabien Reboul; 6–4, 3–6, 7–6^{(7–3)}	(Austria) Maximilian Neuchrist	(United Kingdom) Jack Findel-Hawkins (United States) Ronnie Schneider	(Estonia) Kenneth Raisma (United Kingdom) Evan Hoyt (United Kingdom) Edward Corrie (France) Evan Furness
February 12	Great Britain F3 Futures; Shrewsbury, Great Britain; Hard (indoor) $25,000; Singles and doubles draws	(United Kingdom) Scott Clayton (United Kingdom) Marcus Willis; 6–2, 7–5	(Finland) Harri Heliövaara (Denmark) Frederik Nielsen	(United Kingdom) Jack Findel-Hawkins (United States) Ronnie Schneider	(Estonia) Kenneth Raisma (United Kingdom) Evan Hoyt (United Kingdom) Edward Corrie (France) Evan Furness
February 12	Kazakhstan F1 Futures; Aktobe, Kazakhstan; Hard (indoor) $25,000; Singles and doubles draws	(Russia) Mikhail Fufygin; 4–6, 6–3, 6–4	(Ukraine) Denys Molchanov	(Kazakhstan) Aleksandr Nedovyesov (Germany) Lukas Ollert	(Russia) Roman Safiullin (Kazakhstan) Denis Yevseyev (Kazakhstan) Timur Khabibulin (Uzbekistan) Sergey Fomin
February 12	Kazakhstan F1 Futures; Aktobe, Kazakhstan; Hard (indoor) $25,000; Singles and doubles draws	(Kazakhstan) Timur Khabibulin (Kazakhstan) Aleksandr Nedovyesov; 6–2, 0–0 ret.	(Russia) Alexander Pavlioutchenkov (Russia) Vladimir Polyakov	(Kazakhstan) Aleksandr Nedovyesov (Germany) Lukas Ollert	(Russia) Roman Safiullin (Kazakhstan) Denis Yevseyev (Kazakhstan) Timur Khabibulin (Uzbekistan) Sergey Fomin
February 12	Switzerland F2 Futures; Bellevue, Switzerland; Carpet (indoor) $25,000; Singles and doubles draws	(France) Ugo Humbert; 6–7^{(2–7)}, 7–6^{(7–5)}, 6–3	(Belgium) Niels Desein	(France) Albano Olivetti (France) Hugo Voljacques	(Germany) Julian Lenz (Slovakia) Lukáš Klein (Switzerland) Marc-Andrea Hüsler (Switzerland) Antoine Bellier
February 12	Switzerland F2 Futures; Bellevue, Switzerland; Carpet (indoor) $25,000; Singles and doubles draws	(Belgium) Niels Desein (France) Albano Olivetti; 6–3, 6–1	(United States) Charles Emhardt (United States) Josh Hagar	(France) Albano Olivetti (France) Hugo Voljacques	(Germany) Julian Lenz (Slovakia) Lukáš Klein (Switzerland) Marc-Andrea Hüsler (Switzerland) Antoine Bellier
February 12	Egypt F5 Futures; Sharm El Sheikh, Egypt; Hard $15,000; Singles and doubles draws	(France) Tom Jomby; 6–2, 6–4	(Hungary) Zsombor Piros	(Belgium) Germain Gigounon (France) Jaimee Floyd Angele	(Italy) Andrea Vavassori (Norway) Viktor Durasovic (China) Zhang Zhizhen (United States) Daniel Nguyen
February 12	Egypt F5 Futures; Sharm El Sheikh, Egypt; Hard $15,000; Singles and doubles draws	(France) Tom Jomby (France) Alexis Musialek; 7–6^{(7–2)}, 6–4	(Belgium) Germain Gigounon (Belgium) Jeroen Vanneste	(Belgium) Germain Gigounon (France) Jaimee Floyd Angele	(Italy) Andrea Vavassori (Norway) Viktor Durasovic (China) Zhang Zhizhen (United States) Daniel Nguyen
February 12	Spain F5 Futures; Murcia, Spain; Clay $15,000; Singles and doubles draws	(Serbia) Miljan Zekić; 6–4, 3–6, 6–3	(Spain) Daniel Gimeno Traver	(Spain) Eduard Esteve Lobato (Spain) Sergio Gutiérrez Ferrol	(Italy) Raúl Brancaccio (Spain) David Vega Hernández (Russia) Ivan Gakhov (Spain) Carlos Alcaraz
February 12	Spain F5 Futures; Murcia, Spain; Clay $15,000; Singles and doubles draws	(Brazil) Eduardo Russi Assumpção (Spain) Mario Vilella Martínez; 3–6, 6–3, [10–8]	(Italy) Dante Gennaro (Brazil) Bruno Sant'Anna	(Spain) Eduard Esteve Lobato (Spain) Sergio Gutiérrez Ferrol	(Italy) Raúl Brancaccio (Spain) David Vega Hernández (Russia) Ivan Gakhov (Spain) Carlos Alcaraz
February 12	Tunisia F6 Futures; Djerba, Tunisia; Hard $15,000; Singles and doubles draws	(France) Elliot Benchetrit; 6–3, 6–2	(France) Matteo Martineau	(Tunisia) Anis Ghorbel (France) Johan Tatlot	(Czech Republic) Michal Konečný (Tunisia) Moez Echargui (Italy) Claudio Fortuna (Italy) Federico Iannaccone
February 12	Tunisia F6 Futures; Djerba, Tunisia; Hard $15,000; Singles and doubles draws	(Russia) Alen Avidzba (France) Matteo Martineau; 7–6^{(9–7)}, 6–7^{(5–7)}, [11–9]	(Poland) Michał Dembek (Ukraine) Danylo Kalenichenko	(Tunisia) Anis Ghorbel (France) Johan Tatlot	(Czech Republic) Michal Konečný (Tunisia) Moez Echargui (Italy) Claudio Fortuna (Italy) Federico Iannaccone
February 12	Turkey F6 Futures; Antalya, Turkey; Hard $15,000; Singles and doubles draws	(Bulgaria) Alexandar Lazov; 7–6^{(7–4)}, 6–3	(Hungary) Attila Balázs	(Spain) Jordi Samper Montaña (Turkey) Altuğ Çelikbilek	(Russia) Artur Shakhnubaryan (Belgium) Yannik Reuter (France) Damien Bayard (Brazil) João Pedro Sorgi
February 12	Turkey F6 Futures; Antalya, Turkey; Hard $15,000; Singles and doubles draws	(Turkey) Cengiz Aksu (Turkey) Altuğ Çelikbilek; 6–3, 3–6, [10–3]	(Italy) Omar Giacalone (Italy) Pietro Rondoni	(Spain) Jordi Samper Montaña (Turkey) Altuğ Çelikbilek	(Russia) Artur Shakhnubaryan (Belgium) Yannik Reuter (France) Damien Bayard (Brazil) João Pedro Sorgi
February 19	Kazakhstan F2 Futures; Shymkent, Kazakhstan; Hard (indoor) $25,000; Singles and doubles draws	(Serbia) Nikola Milojević; 6–2, 5–7, 7–6^{(8–6)}	(Uzbekistan) Sanjar Fayziev	(Ukraine) Vladyslav Manafov (Russia) Evgenii Tiurnev	(Russia) Alexander Igoshin (Belarus) Dzmitry Zhyrmont (Russia) Roman Safiullin (Ukraine) Denys Molchanov
February 19	Kazakhstan F2 Futures; Shymkent, Kazakhstan; Hard (indoor) $25,000; Singles and doubles draws	(Ukraine) Vladyslav Manafov (Ukraine) Denys Molchanov; 7–6^{(7–4)}, 3–6, [10–6]	(Estonia) Vladimir Ivanov (Russia) Evgenii Tiurnev	(Ukraine) Vladyslav Manafov (Russia) Evgenii Tiurnev	(Russia) Alexander Igoshin (Belarus) Dzmitry Zhyrmont (Russia) Roman Safiullin (Ukraine) Denys Molchanov
February 19	Egypt F6 Futures; Sharm El Sheikh, Egypt; Hard $15,000; Singles and doubles draws	(Austria) Lucas Miedler; 6–3, 0–6, 6–2	(South Africa) Lloyd Harris	(Belgium) Germain Gigounon (France) Tom Jomby	(Egypt) Karim-Mohamed Maamoun (Netherlands) Jelle Sels (Germany) Frederik Press (Netherlands) Gijs Brouwer
February 19	Egypt F6 Futures; Sharm El Sheikh, Egypt; Hard $15,000; Singles and doubles draws	(Guatemala) Christopher Díaz Figueroa (Guatemala) Wilfredo González; 6–4, 6–4	(Netherlands) Gijs Brouwer (Netherlands) Jelle Sels	(Belgium) Germain Gigounon (France) Tom Jomby	(Egypt) Karim-Mohamed Maamoun (Netherlands) Jelle Sels (Germany) Frederik Press (Netherlands) Gijs Brouwer
February 19	Portugal F1 Futures; Vale do Lobo, Portugal; Hard $15,000; Singles and doubles draws	(Portugal) Frederico Ferreira Silva; 6–2, 6–7^{(3–7)}, 7–5	(Portugal) Tiago Cação	(Belgium) Yannick Mertens (Spain) Sergio Gutiérrez Ferrol	(Brazil) Igor Marcondes (Israel) Ben Patael (Portugal) Fred Gil (France) Manuel Guinard
February 19	Portugal F1 Futures; Vale do Lobo, Portugal; Hard $15,000; Singles and doubles draws	(United States) John Paul Fruttero (Portugal) Fred Gil; 6–1, 6–0	(Portugal) Francisco Cabral (Portugal) Francisco Dias	(Belgium) Yannick Mertens (Spain) Sergio Gutiérrez Ferrol	(Brazil) Igor Marcondes (Israel) Ben Patael (Portugal) Fred Gil (France) Manuel Guinard
February 19	Tunisia F7 Futures; Djerba, Tunisia; Hard $15,000; Singles and doubles draws	(France) Johan Tatlot; 6–1, 6–0	(Russia) Aleksandr Vasilenko	(Germany) Kevin Krawietz (France) Matteo Martineau	(Monaco) Lucas Catarina (Italy) Gianluca Mager (Belgium) Omar Salman (Argentina) Mariano Kestelboim
February 19	Tunisia F7 Futures; Djerba, Tunisia; Hard $15,000; Singles and doubles draws	(France) Sébastien Boltz (France) Matteo Martineau; 6–2, 6–2	(United Kingdom) Jonathan Binding (United Kingdom) Scott Duncan	(Germany) Kevin Krawietz (France) Matteo Martineau	(Monaco) Lucas Catarina (Italy) Gianluca Mager (Belgium) Omar Salman (Argentina) Mariano Kestelboim
February 19	Turkey F7 Futures; Antalya, Turkey; Hard $15,000; Singles and doubles draws	(Hungary) Attila Balázs; 6–1, 6–3	(Bulgaria) Dimitar Kuzmanov	(Brazil) João Pedro Sorgi (Chinese Taipei) Tseng Chun-hsin	(Finland) Emil Ruusuvuori (Netherlands) Scott Griekspoor (United States) Collin Altamirano (Turkey) Altuğ Çelikbilek
February 19	Turkey F7 Futures; Antalya, Turkey; Hard $15,000; Singles and doubles draws	Doubles competition cancelled due to bad weather		(Brazil) João Pedro Sorgi (Chinese Taipei) Tseng Chun-hsin	(Finland) Emil Ruusuvuori (Netherlands) Scott Griekspoor (United States) Collin Altamirano (Turkey) Altuğ Çelikbilek
February 26	Australia F1 Futures; Renmark, Australia; Grass $25,000; Singles and doubles draws	(Australia) Marc Polmans; 6–1, 6–4	(Australia) Luke Saville	(Australia) Harry Bourchier (Australia) Benjamin Mitchell	(Australia) Omar Jasika (United States) Nicholas Hu (Australia) Dayne Kelly (Australia) Moerani Bouzige
February 26	Australia F1 Futures; Renmark, Australia; Grass $25,000; Singles and doubles draws	(Australia) Jeremy Beale (Australia) Thomas Fancutt; 6–3, 6–7^{(5–7)}, [10–7]	(Australia) Dayne Kelly (Australia) Gavin van Peperzeel	(Australia) Harry Bourchier (Australia) Benjamin Mitchell	(Australia) Omar Jasika (United States) Nicholas Hu (Australia) Dayne Kelly (Australia) Moerani Bouzige
February 26	Canada F1 Futures; Gatineau, Canada; Hard (indoor) $25,000; Singles and doubles draws	(France) Ugo Humbert; 6–4, 6–0	(United States) Strong Kirchheimer	(Germany) Dominik Köpfer (France) Florian Lakat	(Canada) Samuel Monette (Colombia) Alejandro González (Canada) Frank Dancevic (United States) Danny Thomas
February 26	Canada F1 Futures; Gatineau, Canada; Hard (indoor) $25,000; Singles and doubles draws	(France) Florian Lakat (United States) Ronnie Schneider; 2–6, 7–6^{(8–6)}, [10–7]	(United States) JC Aragone (United States) Deiton Baughman	(Germany) Dominik Köpfer (France) Florian Lakat	(Canada) Samuel Monette (Colombia) Alejandro González (Canada) Frank Dancevic (United States) Danny Thomas
February 26	Italy F1 Futures; Trento, Italy; Hard (indoor) $25,000; Singles and doubles draws	(Lithuania) Laurynas Grigelis; 6–4, 6–4	(Austria) Maximilian Neuchrist	(Italy) Luca Vanni (France) Rémi Boutillier	(Germany) Jeremy Jahn (United Kingdom) Lloyd Glasspool (France) Grégoire Barrère (Belgium) Romain Barbosa
February 26	Italy F1 Futures; Trento, Italy; Hard (indoor) $25,000; Singles and doubles draws	(France) Sadio Doumbia (Austria) Maximilian Neuchrist; 7–5, 2–6, [10–6]	(Belgium) Romain Barbosa (France) Rémi Boutillier	(Italy) Luca Vanni (France) Rémi Boutillier	(Germany) Jeremy Jahn (United Kingdom) Lloyd Glasspool (France) Grégoire Barrère (Belgium) Romain Barbosa
February 26	Egypt F7 Futures; Sharm El Sheikh, Egypt; Hard $15,000; Singles and doubles draws	(South Africa) Lloyd Harris; 6–4, 4–6, 6–4	(Bosnia and Herzegovina) Aldin Šetkić	(Sweden) Markus Eriksson (Colombia) Eduardo Struvay	(Germany) Rudolf Molleker (Austria) Peter Goldsteiner (Belgium) Clément Geens (Netherlands) Gijs Brouwer
February 26	Egypt F7 Futures; Sharm El Sheikh, Egypt; Hard $15,000; Singles and doubles draws	(Guatemala) Christopher Díaz Figueroa (Guatemala) Wilfredo González; 6–4, 1–6, [10–8]	(Belgium) Clément Geens (Austria) Lucas Miedler	(Sweden) Markus Eriksson (Colombia) Eduardo Struvay	(Germany) Rudolf Molleker (Austria) Peter Goldsteiner (Belgium) Clément Geens (Netherlands) Gijs Brouwer
February 26	Greece F1 Futures; Heraklion, Greece; Hard $15,000; Singles and doubles draws	(Serbia) Danilo Petrović; 7–6^{(11–9)}, 6–2	(France) Yannick Jankovits	(Netherlands) Antal van der Duim (Montenegro) Ljubomir Čelebić	(Italy) Giovanni Fonio (Belgium) Maxime Authom (United Kingdom) Luke Johnson (Hungary) Gábor Borsos
February 26	Greece F1 Futures; Heraklion, Greece; Hard $15,000; Singles and doubles draws	(Hungary) Gábor Borsos (Serbia) Danilo Petrović; 5–7, 6–4, [10–6]	(Switzerland) Adrian Bodmer (Germany) Jakob Sude	(Netherlands) Antal van der Duim (Montenegro) Ljubomir Čelebić	(Italy) Giovanni Fonio (Belgium) Maxime Authom (United Kingdom) Luke Johnson (Hungary) Gábor Borsos
February 26	India F1 Futures; Bhubaneswar, India; Hard $15,000; Singles and doubles draws	(India) Arjun Kadhe; 6–3, 6–2	(India) Vijay Sundar Prashanth	(Czech Republic) Patrik Rikl (India) Sidharth Rawat	(India) Dhruv Sunish (India) Vijayant Malik (India) Vinayak Sharma Kaza (India) Aryan Goveas
February 26	India F1 Futures; Bhubaneswar, India; Hard $15,000; Singles and doubles draws	(India) Sidharth Rawat (India) Manish Sureshkumar; 6–3, 6–2	(India) Arjun Kadhe (India) Vijay Sundar Prashanth	(Czech Republic) Patrik Rikl (India) Sidharth Rawat	(India) Dhruv Sunish (India) Vijayant Malik (India) Vinayak Sharma Kaza (India) Aryan Goveas
February 26	Portugal F2 Futures; Faro, Portugal; Hard $15,000; Singles and doubles draws	(France) Evan Furness; 6–1, 6–1	(France) David Guez	(Spain) Roberto Ortega Olmedo (France) Manuel Guinard	(France) Hugo Gaston (Spain) David Vega Hernández (Republic of Ireland) Peter Bothwell (Russia) Yan Bondarevskiy
February 26	Portugal F2 Futures; Faro, Portugal; Hard $15,000; Singles and doubles draws	Doubles competition cancelled due to bad weather		(Spain) Roberto Ortega Olmedo (France) Manuel Guinard	(France) Hugo Gaston (Spain) David Vega Hernández (Republic of Ireland) Peter Bothwell (Russia) Yan Bondarevskiy
February 26	Qatar F1 Futures; Doha, Qatar; Hard $15,000; Singles and doubles draws	(Netherlands) Scott Griekspoor; 6–4, 6–3	(China) Sun Fajing	(United Kingdom) Jay Clarke (Italy) Omar Giacalone	(Kazakhstan) Denis Yevseyev (Hungary) Zsombor Piros (Italy) Pietro Rondoni (Belgium) Jonas Merckx
February 26	Qatar F1 Futures; Doha, Qatar; Hard $15,000; Singles and doubles draws	(Belgium) Jonas Merckx (Sweden) Fred Simonsson; 6–7^{(3–7)}, 6–3, [10–4]	(Belgium) Zizou Bergs (Netherlands) Scott Griekspoor	(United Kingdom) Jay Clarke (Italy) Omar Giacalone	(Kazakhstan) Denis Yevseyev (Hungary) Zsombor Piros (Italy) Pietro Rondoni (Belgium) Jonas Merckx
February 26	Russia F1 Futures; Moscow, Russia; Hard (indoor) $15,000; Singles and doubles draws	(Russia) Artem Dubrivnyy; 6–2, 6–2	(Russia) Anton Zaitcev	(Russia) Denis Matsukevich (Russia) Alexander Igoshin	(Russia) Dmitry Mnushkin (Russia) Matvey Khomentovskiy (Belarus) Sergey Betov (Russia) Philipp Davydenko
February 26	Russia F1 Futures; Moscow, Russia; Hard (indoor) $15,000; Singles and doubles draws	(Belarus) Sergey Betov (Belarus) Ivan Liutarevich; 6–2, 6–4	(Russia) Mikhail Fufygin (Estonia) Vladimir Ivanov	(Russia) Denis Matsukevich (Russia) Alexander Igoshin	(Russia) Dmitry Mnushkin (Russia) Matvey Khomentovskiy (Belarus) Sergey Betov (Russia) Philipp Davydenko
February 26	Tunisia F8 Futures; Djerba, Tunisia; Hard $15,000; Singles and doubles draws	(Tunisia) Moez Echargui; 7–6^{(7–5)}, 2–6, 6–1	(France) Alexandre Müller	(France) Tak Khunn Wang (Czech Republic) Jan Mertl	(Brazil) Eduardo Dischinger (Argentina) Mariano Kestelboim (Belgium) Omar Salman (Monaco) Lucas Catarina
February 26	Tunisia F8 Futures; Djerba, Tunisia; Hard $15,000; Singles and doubles draws	(Argentina) Mariano Kestelboim (Germany) Kevin Krawietz; 4–6, 6–3, [10–7]	(Brazil) Eduardo Dischinger (Japan) Ken Onishi	(France) Tak Khunn Wang (Czech Republic) Jan Mertl	(Brazil) Eduardo Dischinger (Argentina) Mariano Kestelboim (Belgium) Omar Salman (Monaco) Lucas Catarina
February 26	Turkey F8 Futures; Antalya, Turkey; Hard $15,000; Singles and doubles draws	(Bulgaria) Dimitar Kuzmanov; 6–3, 6–0	(Italy) Flavio Cipolla	(Germany) Peter Torebko (Spain) Oriol Roca Batalla	(Turkey) Anıl Yüksel (Serbia) Marko Miladinović (Serbia) Nikola Ćaćić (Turkey) Altuğ Çelikbilek
February 26	Turkey F8 Futures; Antalya, Turkey; Hard $15,000; Singles and doubles draws	(Serbia) Nikola Ćaćić (Poland) Maciej Smoła; 6–3, 6–4	(Netherlands) Michiel de Krom (Netherlands) Ryan Nijboer	(Germany) Peter Torebko (Spain) Oriol Roca Batalla	(Turkey) Anıl Yüksel (Serbia) Marko Miladinović (Serbia) Nikola Ćaćić (Turkey) Altuğ Çelikbilek

=== March ===
Week of	Tournament	Winner	Runners-up	Semifinalists	Quarterfinalists
March 5	Australia F2 Futures; Mildura, Australia; Grass $25,000; Singles and doubles draws	(Australia) Marc Polmans; 7–6^{(7–4)}, 6–3	(Australia) Thomas Fancutt	(Australia) Luke Saville (Australia) Dayne Kelly	(Australia) Matthew Barton (Australia) Bradley Mousley (Australia) Benjamin Mitchell (Australia) Harry Bourchier
March 5	Australia F2 Futures; Mildura, Australia; Grass $25,000; Singles and doubles draws	(Australia) Jeremy Beale (Australia) Thomas Fancutt; 6–4, 6–4	(Australia) Edward Bourchier (Australia) Harry Bourchier	(Australia) Luke Saville (Australia) Dayne Kelly	(Australia) Matthew Barton (Australia) Bradley Mousley (Australia) Benjamin Mitchell (Australia) Harry Bourchier
March 5	Canada F2 Futures; Sherbrooke, Canada; Hard (indoor) $25,000; Singles and doubles draws	(Germany) Dominik Köpfer; 6–7^{(3–7)}, 7–5, 6–2	(United States) Michael Redlicki	(United States) JC Aragone (Canada) Brayden Schnur	(Belgium) Joris De Loore (France) Ugo Humbert (United States) Christopher Eubanks (Canada) Filip Peliwo
March 5	Canada F2 Futures; Sherbrooke, Canada; Hard (indoor) $25,000; Singles and doubles draws	(United Kingdom) Luke Bambridge (United Kingdom) Joe Salisbury; 6–3, 7–5	(Switzerland) Adrien Bossel (Belgium) Joris De Loore	(United States) JC Aragone (Canada) Brayden Schnur	(Belgium) Joris De Loore (France) Ugo Humbert (United States) Christopher Eubanks (Canada) Filip Peliwo
March 5	Italy F2 Futures; Pula, Italy; Clay $25,000; Singles and doubles draws	(Netherlands) Thiemo de Bakker; 6–2, 5–7, 6–1	(Hungary) Attila Balázs	(India) Sumit Nagal (Italy) Lorenzo Giustino	(Italy) Walter Trusendi (United Kingdom) Billy Harris (Brazil) Wilson Leite (Argentina) Marco Trungelliti
March 5	Italy F2 Futures; Pula, Italy; Clay $25,000; Singles and doubles draws	(Italy) Gianluca Di Nicola (Italy) Walter Trusendi; 7–5, 6–3	(United Kingdom) Billy Harris (Poland) Maciej Rajski	(India) Sumit Nagal (Italy) Lorenzo Giustino	(Italy) Walter Trusendi (United Kingdom) Billy Harris (Brazil) Wilson Leite (Argentina) Marco Trungelliti
March 5	Croatia F1 Futures; Rovinj, Croatia; Clay $15,000; Singles and doubles draws	(Croatia) Nino Serdarušić; 6–7^{(4–7)}, 6–2, 6–4	(Spain) Javier Barranco Cosano	(Croatia) Mate Delić (Ecuador) Gonzalo Escobar	(North Macedonia) Tomislav Jotovski (Spain) Marc Giner (Romania) Dragoș Dima (Italy) Matteo Viola
March 5	Croatia F1 Futures; Rovinj, Croatia; Clay $15,000; Singles and doubles draws	(Croatia) Ivan Sabanov (Croatia) Matej Sabanov; 6–4, 6–3	(Spain) Javier Barranco Cosano (Italy) Marco Bortolotti	(Croatia) Mate Delić (Ecuador) Gonzalo Escobar	(North Macedonia) Tomislav Jotovski (Spain) Marc Giner (Romania) Dragoș Dima (Italy) Matteo Viola
March 5	Egypt F8 Futures; Sharm El Sheikh, Egypt; Hard $15,000; Singles and doubles draws	(Austria) Lucas Miedler; 6–3, 6–4	(Egypt) Karim-Mohamed Maamoun	(Serbia) Dejan Katić (South Africa) Lloyd Harris	(Bosnia and Herzegovina) Aldin Šetkić (Spain) Guillermo Olaso (Netherlands) Jelle Sels (Slovakia) Lukáš Klein
March 5	Egypt F8 Futures; Sharm El Sheikh, Egypt; Hard $15,000; Singles and doubles draws	(Guatemala) Christopher Díaz Figueroa (Guatemala) Wilfredo González; 6–4, 4–6, [12–10]	(United States) Robert Galloway (Zimbabwe) Benjamin Lock	(Serbia) Dejan Katić (South Africa) Lloyd Harris	(Bosnia and Herzegovina) Aldin Šetkić (Spain) Guillermo Olaso (Netherlands) Jelle Sels (Slovakia) Lukáš Klein
March 5	France F4 Futures; Toulouse, France; Hard (indoor) $15,000; Singles and doubles draws	(Netherlands) Igor Sijsling; 6–3, ret.	(Netherlands) Botic van de Zandschulp	(France) Grégoire Barrère (France) David Guez	(France) Jaimee Floyd Angele (Belgium) Romain Barbosa (France) Rémi Boutillier (France) Laurent Rochette
March 5	France F4 Futures; Toulouse, France; Hard (indoor) $15,000; Singles and doubles draws	(France) Dan Added (France) Albano Olivetti; 6–3, 7–5	(Netherlands) Igor Sijsling (Netherlands) Botic van de Zandschulp	(France) Grégoire Barrère (France) David Guez	(France) Jaimee Floyd Angele (Belgium) Romain Barbosa (France) Rémi Boutillier (France) Laurent Rochette
March 5	Greece F2 Futures; Heraklion, Greece; Hard $15,000; Singles and doubles draws	(Belgium) Maxime Authom; 6–7^{(8–10)}, 6–3, 6–2	(Serbia) Danilo Petrović	(Germany) Jakob Sude (United Kingdom) Neil Pauffley	(Russia) Markos Kalovelonis (Italy) Riccardo Balzerani (Spain) Andrés Artuñedo (France) Yannick Jankovits
March 5	Greece F2 Futures; Heraklion, Greece; Hard $15,000; Singles and doubles draws	(Italy) Andrea Guerrieri (Italy) Alessandro Motti; 7–5, 6–3	(United Kingdom) Jonathan Gray (United Kingdom) Luke Johnson	(Germany) Jakob Sude (United Kingdom) Neil Pauffley	(Russia) Markos Kalovelonis (Italy) Riccardo Balzerani (Spain) Andrés Artuñedo (France) Yannick Jankovits
March 5	India F2 Futures; Kolkata, India; Hard $15,000; Singles and doubles draws	(Spain) Carlos Boluda-Purkiss; 6–0, 6–4	(India) Arjun Kadhe	(India) Karunuday Singh (India) Saketh Myneni	(Chinese Taipei) Lo Chien-hsun (India) Suraj Prabodh (Vietnam) Lý Hoàng Nam (India) Sasikumar Mukund
March 5	India F2 Futures; Kolkata, India; Hard $15,000; Singles and doubles draws	(India) Arjun Kadhe (India) Vijay Sundar Prashanth; 6–2, 5–7, [10–5]	(Spain) Carlos Boluda-Purkiss (Vietnam) Lý Hoàng Nam	(India) Karunuday Singh (India) Saketh Myneni	(Chinese Taipei) Lo Chien-hsun (India) Suraj Prabodh (Vietnam) Lý Hoàng Nam (India) Sasikumar Mukund
March 5	Israel F1 Futures; Ramat Gan, Israel; Hard $15,000; Singles and doubles draws	(Czech Republic) David Poljak; 7–5, 6–4	(Italy) Alessandro Bega	(Belgium) Yannick Mertens (Belgium) Yannick Vandenbulcke	(Italy) Gianluca Mager (Netherlands) Boy Westerhof (Israel) Yannai Barkai (France) Alexis Musialek
March 5	Israel F1 Futures; Ramat Gan, Israel; Hard $15,000; Singles and doubles draws	(Israel) Bar Tzuf Botzer (France) Alexis Musialek; 6–4, 6–4	(Israel) Yannai Barkai (Israel) Alon Elia	(Belgium) Yannick Mertens (Belgium) Yannick Vandenbulcke	(Italy) Gianluca Mager (Netherlands) Boy Westerhof (Israel) Yannai Barkai (France) Alexis Musialek
March 5	Japan F1 Futures; Nishitama, Japan; Hard $15,000; Singles and doubles draws	(United States) Daniel Nguyen; 5–7, 7–6^{(7–4)}, 6–4	(Thailand) Wishaya Trongcharoenchaikul	(Japan) Takashi Saito (Japan) Takuto Niki	(Japan) Yuki Mochizuki (Japan) Yuta Shimizu (Japan) Naoki Nakagawa (Japan) Soichiro Moritani
March 5	Japan F1 Futures; Nishitama, Japan; Hard $15,000; Singles and doubles draws	(Japan) Shintaro Imai (Japan) Takuto Niki; 6–1, 6–4	(Japan) Sho Katayama (Japan) Soichiro Moritani	(Japan) Takashi Saito (Japan) Takuto Niki	(Japan) Yuki Mochizuki (Japan) Yuta Shimizu (Japan) Naoki Nakagawa (Japan) Soichiro Moritani
March 5	Portugal F3 Futures; Loulé, Portugal; Hard $15,000; Singles and doubles draws	(Portugal) Frederico Ferreira Silva; 5–7, 6–1, 3–1 ret.	(Spain) David Vega Hernández	(Spain) Alejandro Davidovich Fokina (Spain) Pablo Vivero González	(Canada) Steven Diez (Portugal) Fred Gil (Spain) Miguel Semmler (Brazil) Carlos Eduardo Severino
March 5	Portugal F3 Futures; Loulé, Portugal; Hard $15,000; Singles and doubles draws	(Spain) Roberto Ortega Olmedo (Spain) David Vega Hernández; 4–6, 6–4, [10–3]	(Austria) Maximilian Neuchrist (Austria) David Pichler	(Spain) Alejandro Davidovich Fokina (Spain) Pablo Vivero González	(Canada) Steven Diez (Portugal) Fred Gil (Spain) Miguel Semmler (Brazil) Carlos Eduardo Severino
March 5	Qatar F2 Futures; Doha, Qatar; Hard $15,000; Singles and doubles draws	(Germany) Benjamin Hassan; 3–6, 7–6^{(7–1)}, 6–4	(United Kingdom) Jay Clarke	(Germany) Tobias Simon (Turkey) Marsel İlhan	(Sweden) Fred Simonsson (Belgium) Jonas Merckx (Netherlands) Scott Griekspoor (China) Sun Fajing
March 5	Qatar F2 Futures; Doha, Qatar; Hard $15,000; Singles and doubles draws	(Belgium) Zizou Bergs (Sweden) Fred Simonsson; 6–4, 3–6, [10–6]	(Czech Republic) Marek Gengel (Czech Republic) Matěj Vocel	(Germany) Tobias Simon (Turkey) Marsel İlhan	(Sweden) Fred Simonsson (Belgium) Jonas Merckx (Netherlands) Scott Griekspoor (China) Sun Fajing
March 5	Russia F2 Futures; Almetyevsk, Russia; Hard (indoor) $15,000; Singles and doubles draws	(Belarus) Dzmitry Zhyrmont; 6–1, 3–0, ret.	(Russia) Evgenii Tiurnev	(Belarus) Yaraslav Shyla (Russia) Shalva Dzhanashiya	(Ukraine) Vadym Ursu (Russia) Mikhail Fufygin (Russia) Alexander Boborykin (Russia) Dimitriy Voronin
March 5	Russia F2 Futures; Almetyevsk, Russia; Hard (indoor) $15,000; Singles and doubles draws	(Russia) Alexander Pavlioutchenkov (Russia) Evgenii Tiurnev; 6–4, 7–5	(Belarus) Aliaksandr Liaonenka (Belarus) Yaraslav Shyla	(Belarus) Yaraslav Shyla (Russia) Shalva Dzhanashiya	(Ukraine) Vadym Ursu (Russia) Mikhail Fufygin (Russia) Alexander Boborykin (Russia) Dimitriy Voronin
March 5	Tunisia F9 Futures; Djerba, Tunisia; Hard $15,000; Singles and doubles draws	(Germany) Kevin Krawietz; 6–2, 6–1	(France) Gianni Mina	(France) Jonathan Kanar (United States) Mitchell Thomas McDaniels	(Lithuania) Laurynas Grigelis (Czech Republic) Michael Vrbenský (Czech Republic) Filip Duda (France) François-Arthur Vibert
March 5	Tunisia F9 Futures; Djerba, Tunisia; Hard $15,000; Singles and doubles draws	(Germany) Kevin Krawietz (Russia) Aleksandr Vasilenko; 6–7^{(3–7)}, 6–3, [10–8]	(France) Florent Diep (France) Jonathan Kanar	(France) Jonathan Kanar (United States) Mitchell Thomas McDaniels	(Lithuania) Laurynas Grigelis (Czech Republic) Michael Vrbenský (Czech Republic) Filip Duda (France) François-Arthur Vibert
March 5	Turkey F9 Futures; Antalya, Turkey; Clay $15,000; Singles and doubles draws	(Peru) Juan Pablo Varillas; 6–4, 6–4	(Austria) Dennis Novak	(Argentina) Camilo Ugo Carabelli (Germany) Peter Torebko	(Czech Republic) Adam Pavlásek (France) Alexandre Müller (Russia) Ivan Nedelko (Ukraine) Oleg Prihodko
March 5	Turkey F9 Futures; Antalya, Turkey; Clay $15,000; Singles and doubles draws	(Mexico) Luis Patiño (Ukraine) Oleg Prihodko; 3–6, 6–3, [10–8]	(Brazil) Oscar José Gutierrez (Brazil) Nicolas Santos	(Argentina) Camilo Ugo Carabelli (Germany) Peter Torebko	(Czech Republic) Adam Pavlásek (France) Alexandre Müller (Russia) Ivan Nedelko (Ukraine) Oleg Prihodko
March 12	Italy F3 Futures; Pula, Italy; Clay $25,000; Singles and doubles draws	(Bolivia) Hugo Dellien; 6–4, 7–6^{(7–3)}	(Uruguay) Martín Cuevas	(Hungary) Attila Balázs (Italy) Andrea Basso	(Slovakia) Filip Horanský (Italy) Edoardo Eremin (Turkey) Ergi Kırkın (Italy) Lorenzo Giustino
March 12	Italy F3 Futures; Pula, Italy; Clay $25,000; Singles and doubles draws	(Uruguay) Martín Cuevas (Bolivia) Hugo Dellien; 7–6^{(7–1)}, 7–5	(Italy) Gianluca Di Nicola (Italy) Walter Trusendi	(Hungary) Attila Balázs (Italy) Andrea Basso	(Slovakia) Filip Horanský (Italy) Edoardo Eremin (Turkey) Ergi Kırkın (Italy) Lorenzo Giustino
March 12	Spain F6 Futures; Xàbia, Spain; Clay $25,000; Singles and doubles draws	(Belgium) Germain Gigounon; 6–4, 6–3	(Argentina) Marco Trungelliti	(Spain) Sergio Gutiérrez Ferrol (Belgium) Kimmer Coppejans	(Brazil) João Menezes (Spain) Marc Giner (Australia) Alexei Popyrin (Spain) Pedro Martínez
March 12	Spain F6 Futures; Xàbia, Spain; Clay $25,000; Singles and doubles draws	(Belgium) Germain Gigounon (Spain) Pedro Martínez; 7–6^{(7–4)}, 7–6^{(7–1)}	(Belgium) Kimmer Coppejans (Russia) Ivan Gakhov	(Spain) Sergio Gutiérrez Ferrol (Belgium) Kimmer Coppejans	(Brazil) João Menezes (Spain) Marc Giner (Australia) Alexei Popyrin (Spain) Pedro Martínez
March 12	USA F7 Futures; Bakersfield, United States; Hard $25,000; Singles and doubles draws	(France) Mathias Bourgue; 6–2, 6–3	(Germany) Jan Choinski	(Sweden) Mikael Ymer (Croatia) Borna Gojo	(France) Laurent Lokoli (United States) Henry Craig (United States) Ulises Blanch (United Kingdom) Lloyd Glasspool
March 12	USA F7 Futures; Bakersfield, United States; Hard $25,000; Singles and doubles draws	(Portugal) Bernardo Saraiva (Netherlands) Sem Verbeek; 7–6^{(7–2)}, 6–3	(Bolivia) Boris Arias (Bolivia) Federico Zeballos	(Sweden) Mikael Ymer (Croatia) Borna Gojo	(France) Laurent Lokoli (United States) Henry Craig (United States) Ulises Blanch (United Kingdom) Lloyd Glasspool
March 12	Croatia F2 Futures; Poreč, Croatia; Clay $15,000; Singles and doubles draws	(Hungary) Máté Valkusz; 6–0, 6–3	(Romania) Dragoș Dima	(Spain) David Pérez Sanz (Germany) Jeremy Jahn	(Slovenia) Nik Razboršek (Croatia) Matej Sabanov (Croatia) Franjo Raspudić (Italy) Matteo Viola
March 12	Croatia F2 Futures; Poreč, Croatia; Clay $15,000; Singles and doubles draws	(Ecuador) Gonzalo Escobar (Brazil) Bruno Sant'Anna; 6–4, 5–7, [11–9]	(Croatia) Ivan Sabanov (Croatia) Matej Sabanov	(Spain) David Pérez Sanz (Germany) Jeremy Jahn	(Slovenia) Nik Razboršek (Croatia) Matej Sabanov (Croatia) Franjo Raspudić (Italy) Matteo Viola
March 12	Egypt F9 Futures; Sharm El Sheikh, Egypt; Hard $15,000; Singles and doubles draws	(Slovakia) Lukáš Klein; 2–6, 6–3, 6–3	(Slovakia) Patrik Néma	(Zimbabwe) Benjamin Lock (Russia) Anton Zaitcev	(United Kingdom) Aidan McHugh (Russia) Kirill Kivattsev (United States) Hady Habib (Egypt) Youssef Hossam
March 12	Egypt F9 Futures; Sharm El Sheikh, Egypt; Hard $15,000; Singles and doubles draws	(Guatemala) Wilfredo González (Zimbabwe) Benjamin Lock; 6–3, 6–4	(Austria) Alexander Erler (Czech Republic) Jaroslav Pospíšil	(Zimbabwe) Benjamin Lock (Russia) Anton Zaitcev	(United Kingdom) Aidan McHugh (Russia) Kirill Kivattsev (United States) Hady Habib (Egypt) Youssef Hossam
March 12	France F5 Futures; Poitiers, France; Hard (indoor) $15,000; Singles and doubles draws	(France) Antoine Hoang; 3–6, 6–1, 6–4	(Netherlands) Igor Sijsling	(France) Tristan Lamasine (France) Tak Khunn Wang	(France) Gabriel Petit (Netherlands) Botic van de Zandschulp (France) Hugo Voljacques (France) Maxence Beaugé
March 12	France F5 Futures; Poitiers, France; Hard (indoor) $15,000; Singles and doubles draws	(Norway) Viktor Durasovic (Finland) Emil Ruusuvuori; 6–4, 7–6^{(7–1)}	(Germany) Christian Hirschmüller (Germany) David Novotny	(France) Tristan Lamasine (France) Tak Khunn Wang	(France) Gabriel Petit (Netherlands) Botic van de Zandschulp (France) Hugo Voljacques (France) Maxence Beaugé
March 12	Greece F3 Futures; Heraklion, Greece; Hard $15,000; Singles and doubles draws	(Serbia) Marko Tepavac; 6–3, 7–5	(Chile) Marcelo Tomás Barrios Vera	(Italy) Luca Giacomini (Croatia) Fran Zvonimir Zgombić	(Italy) Filippo Baldi (Italy) Erik Crepaldi (Switzerland) Adrian Bodmer (United Kingdom) Neil Pauffley
March 12	Greece F3 Futures; Heraklion, Greece; Hard $15,000; Singles and doubles draws	(Switzerland) Adrian Bodmer (Germany) Jakob Sude; 6–4, 6–3	(Italy) Filippo Baldi (Italy) Julian Ocleppo	(Italy) Luca Giacomini (Croatia) Fran Zvonimir Zgombić	(Italy) Filippo Baldi (Italy) Erik Crepaldi (Switzerland) Adrian Bodmer (United Kingdom) Neil Pauffley
March 12	India F3 Futures; Chandigarh, India; Hard $15,000; Singles and doubles draws	(India) Prajnesh Gunneswaran; 6–3, 6–4	(Vietnam) Lý Hoàng Nam	(Argentina) Manuel Peña López (Spain) Carlos Boluda-Purkiss	(India) Dalwinder Singh (India) Sidharth Rawat (India) Karunuday Singh (India) Arjun Kadhe
March 12	India F3 Futures; Chandigarh, India; Hard $15,000; Singles and doubles draws	(India) Arjun Kadhe (India) Vijay Sundar Prashanth; 6–3, 6–1	(India) Mohit Mayur Jayaprakash (India) Vinayak Sharma Kaza	(Argentina) Manuel Peña López (Spain) Carlos Boluda-Purkiss	(India) Dalwinder Singh (India) Sidharth Rawat (India) Karunuday Singh (India) Arjun Kadhe
March 12	Israel F2 Futures; Ramat HaSharon, Israel; Hard $15,000; Singles and doubles draws	(Finland) Harri Heliövaara; 6–1, 6–3	(Israel) Yshai Oliel	(Argentina) Matías Franco Descotte (France) Alexis Musialek	(Italy) Roberto Marcora (Ukraine) Danylo Kalenichenko (France) Antoine Cornut-Chauvinc (Israel) Ben Patael
March 12	Israel F2 Futures; Ramat HaSharon, Israel; Hard $15,000; Singles and doubles draws	(Finland) Harri Heliövaara (Finland) Patrik Niklas-Salminen; 6–3, 6–2	(Ukraine) Marat Deviatiarov (Ukraine) Volodymyr Uzhylovskyi	(Argentina) Matías Franco Descotte (France) Alexis Musialek	(Italy) Roberto Marcora (Ukraine) Danylo Kalenichenko (France) Antoine Cornut-Chauvinc (Israel) Ben Patael
March 12	Japan F2 Futures; Nishitōkyō, Japan; Hard $15,000; Singles and doubles draws	(United States) Daniel Nguyen; 6–7^{(5–7)}, 7–6^{(7–3)}, 7–6^{(7–5)}	(Chinese Taipei) Wu Tung-lin	(Japan) Kaichi Uchida (Japan) Shintaro Imai	(South Korea) Hong Seong-chan (Japan) Kaito Uesugi (Japan) Soichiro Moritani (Japan) Naoki Nakagawa
March 12	Japan F2 Futures; Nishitōkyō, Japan; Hard $15,000; Singles and doubles draws	(Japan) Shintaro Imai (Japan) Takuto Niki; 7–5, 6–3	(South Korea) Lee Tae-woo (South Korea) Lim Yong-kyu	(Japan) Kaichi Uchida (Japan) Shintaro Imai	(South Korea) Hong Seong-chan (Japan) Kaito Uesugi (Japan) Soichiro Moritani (Japan) Naoki Nakagawa
March 12	Portugal F4 Futures; Quinta do Lago, Portugal; Hard $15,000; Singles and doubles draws	(Spain) Alejandro Davidovich Fokina; 7–5, 4–6, 6–1	(Spain) Roberto Ortega Olmedo	(Austria) Maximilian Neuchrist (Republic of Ireland) Peter Bothwell	(Chinese Taipei) Yang Tsung-hua (Switzerland) Marc-Andrea Hüsler (United States) Dusty Boyer (France) Gianni Mina
March 12	Portugal F4 Futures; Quinta do Lago, Portugal; Hard $15,000; Singles and doubles draws	(Republic of Ireland) Peter Bothwell (United Kingdom) Jack Findel-Hawkins; 7–6^{(7–5)}, 7–6^{(7–3)}	(Portugal) Francisco Cabral (Portugal) Tiago Cação	(Austria) Maximilian Neuchrist (Republic of Ireland) Peter Bothwell	(Chinese Taipei) Yang Tsung-hua (Switzerland) Marc-Andrea Hüsler (United States) Dusty Boyer (France) Gianni Mina
March 12	Qatar F3 Futures; Doha, Qatar; Hard $15,000; Singles and doubles draws	(United Kingdom) Jay Clarke; 6–1, 7–5	(Italy) Pietro Rondoni	(Italy) Omar Giacalone (Germany) Daniel Altmaier	(Czech Republic) Jan Mertl (Belgium) Zizou Bergs (United States) Adam El Mihdawy (China) Sun Fajing
March 12	Qatar F3 Futures; Doha, Qatar; Hard $15,000; Singles and doubles draws	(China) Sun Fajing (Hong Kong) Wong Chun-hun; 6–3, 6–3	(Czech Republic) Marek Gengel (Czech Republic) Matěj Vocel	(Italy) Omar Giacalone (Germany) Daniel Altmaier	(Czech Republic) Jan Mertl (Belgium) Zizou Bergs (United States) Adam El Mihdawy (China) Sun Fajing
March 12	Russia F3 Futures; Kazan, Russia; Hard (indoor) $15,000; Singles and doubles draws	(Russia) Roman Safiullin; 6–2, 6–1	(Uzbekistan) Jurabek Karimov	(Russia) Pavel Kotov (Belarus) Sergey Betov	(Russia) Teymuraz Gabashvili (Russia) Timofey Skatov (Russia) Maxim Ratniuk (Russia) Alexey Zakharov
March 12	Russia F3 Futures; Kazan, Russia; Hard (indoor) $15,000; Singles and doubles draws	(Russia) Alexander Pavlioutchenkov (Russia) Evgenii Tiurnev; 6–4, 3–6, [10–6]	(Russia) Teymuraz Gabashvili (Russia) Roman Safiullin	(Russia) Pavel Kotov (Belarus) Sergey Betov	(Russia) Teymuraz Gabashvili (Russia) Timofey Skatov (Russia) Maxim Ratniuk (Russia) Alexey Zakharov
March 12	Tunisia F10 Futures; Hammamet, Tunisia; Clay $15,000; Singles and doubles draws	(Spain) Oriol Roca Batalla; 6–1, 3–6, 7–6^{(9–7)}	(Argentina) Patricio Heras	(Argentina) Hernán Casanova (France) Elliot Benchetrit	(Argentina) Mariano Kestelboim (France) Florent Diep (Spain) Eduard Esteve Lobato (Argentina) Eduardo Agustín Torre
March 12	Tunisia F10 Futures; Hammamet, Tunisia; Clay $15,000; Singles and doubles draws	(Peru) Alexander Merino (Germany) Christoph Negritu; 6–3, 3–6, [10–5]	(Argentina) Hernán Casanova (Argentina) Eduardo Agustín Torre	(Argentina) Hernán Casanova (France) Elliot Benchetrit	(Argentina) Mariano Kestelboim (France) Florent Diep (Spain) Eduard Esteve Lobato (Argentina) Eduardo Agustín Torre
March 12	Turkey F10 Futures; Antalya, Turkey; Clay $15,000; Singles and doubles draws	(Russia) Ivan Nedelko; 6–2, 7–6^{(7–3)}	(Peru) Juan Pablo Varillas	(Austria) Dennis Novak (Brazil) Oscar José Gutierrez	(Germany) Marvin Netuschil (Mexico) Luis Patiño (Russia) Mikhail Korovin (Brazil) Rafael Matos
March 12	Turkey F10 Futures; Antalya, Turkey; Clay $15,000; Singles and doubles draws	(Italy) Antonio Massara (Colombia) Cristian Rodríguez; 6–3, 7–6^{(7–3)}	(Brazil) Rafael Matos (Brazil) Marcelo Zormann	(Austria) Dennis Novak (Brazil) Oscar José Gutierrez	(Germany) Marvin Netuschil (Mexico) Luis Patiño (Russia) Mikhail Korovin (Brazil) Rafael Matos
March 19	Australia F3 Futures; Mornington, Australia; Clay $25,000; Singles and doubles draws	(Australia) Marc Polmans; 7–6^{(7–5)}, 6–2	(Australia) Max Purcell	(Australia) Matthew Romios (Australia) Jeremy Beale	(Australia) Lucas Vuradin (Australia) Aaron Addison (Australia) Blake Ellis (Australia) Thomas Fancutt
March 19	Australia F3 Futures; Mornington, Australia; Clay $25,000; Singles and doubles draws	(Chinese Taipei) Hsu Yu-hsiou (Australia) Matthew Romios; 6–3, 6–3	(Australia) Tom Evans (Australia) Max Purcell	(Australia) Matthew Romios (Australia) Jeremy Beale	(Australia) Lucas Vuradin (Australia) Aaron Addison (Australia) Blake Ellis (Australia) Thomas Fancutt
March 19	Italy F4 Futures; Pula, Italy; Clay $25,000; Singles and doubles draws	(Hungary) Attila Balázs; 6–2, 7–5	(Bosnia and Herzegovina) Tomislav Brkić	(Argentina) Gerónimo Espín Busleiman (Bolivia) Hugo Dellien	(Austria) Lenny Hampel (Uruguay) Martín Cuevas (Italy) Edoardo Eremin (Slovakia) Filip Horanský
March 19	Italy F4 Futures; Pula, Italy; Clay $25,000; Singles and doubles draws	(Bosnia and Herzegovina) Tomislav Brkić (Serbia) Milan Radojković; 6–3, 4–6, [10–7]	(Argentina) Franco Capalbo (Argentina) Gerónimo Espín Busleiman	(Argentina) Gerónimo Espín Busleiman (Bolivia) Hugo Dellien	(Austria) Lenny Hampel (Uruguay) Martín Cuevas (Italy) Edoardo Eremin (Slovakia) Filip Horanský
March 19	Portugal F5 Futures; Vilamoura, Portugal; Hard $25,000; Singles and doubles draws	(South Africa) Lloyd Harris; 4–6, 6–1, 6–0	(Spain) Roberto Ortega Olmedo	(Portugal) João Monteiro (Egypt) Youssef Hossam	(Portugal) Tiago Cação (Belgium) Romain Barbosa (Spain) Pablo Vivero González (Czech Republic) Robin Staněk
March 19	Portugal F5 Futures; Vilamoura, Portugal; Hard $25,000; Singles and doubles draws	(Portugal) Francisco Cabral (Portugal) Tiago Cação; 6–3, 6–2	(Portugal) Fred Gil (South Africa) Lloyd Harris	(Portugal) João Monteiro (Egypt) Youssef Hossam	(Portugal) Tiago Cação (Belgium) Romain Barbosa (Spain) Pablo Vivero González (Czech Republic) Robin Staněk
March 19	USA F8 Futures; Calabasas, United States; Hard $25,000; Singles and doubles draws	(United States) JC Aragone; 6–2, 6–4	(United States) Marcos Giron	(United States) Tom Fawcett (United States) Collin Altamirano	(France) Mathias Bourgue (France) Corentin Denolly (United States) Deiton Baughman (France) Laurent Lokoli
March 19	USA F8 Futures; Calabasas, United States; Hard $25,000; Singles and doubles draws	(Sweden) André Göransson (France) Florian Lakat; 6–2, 7–6^{(7–3)}	(Portugal) Bernardo Saraiva (Netherlands) Sem Verbeek	(United States) Tom Fawcett (United States) Collin Altamirano	(France) Mathias Bourgue (France) Corentin Denolly (United States) Deiton Baughman (France) Laurent Lokoli
March 19	Bahrain F1 Futures; Manama, Bahrain; Hard $15,000; Singles and doubles draws	(Netherlands) Jelle Sels; 6–7^{(6–8)}, 6–1, 6–3	(Switzerland) Riccardo Maiga	(Czech Republic) Patrik Rikl (Czech Republic) Dominik Kellovský	(United Kingdom) Thomas Colautti (Germany) Lukas Ollert (Ukraine) Vladyslav Orlov (United States) Robert Galloway
March 19	Bahrain F1 Futures; Manama, Bahrain; Hard $15,000; Singles and doubles draws	(Czech Republic) Marek Gengel (Czech Republic) Dominik Kellovský; 6–3, 3–6, [10–6]	(United States) Robert Galloway (United States) Anderson Reed	(Czech Republic) Patrik Rikl (Czech Republic) Dominik Kellovský	(United Kingdom) Thomas Colautti (Germany) Lukas Ollert (Ukraine) Vladyslav Orlov (United States) Robert Galloway
March 19	Croatia F3 Futures; Opatija, Croatia; Clay $15,000; Singles and doubles draws	(France) Geoffrey Blancaneaux; 6–2, 3–6, 6–2	(Croatia) Nino Serdarušić	(Italy) Matteo Viola (Hungary) Péter Nagy	(Croatia) Deni Žmak (Montenegro) Ljubomir Čelebić (Croatia) Mate Delić (Romania) Dragoș Dima
March 19	Croatia F3 Futures; Opatija, Croatia; Clay $15,000; Singles and doubles draws	(Argentina) Tomás Lipovšek Puches (Brazil) Bruno Sant'Anna; 6–4, 6–1	(Montenegro) Ljubomir Čelebić (Hungary) Péter Nagy	(Italy) Matteo Viola (Hungary) Péter Nagy	(Croatia) Deni Žmak (Montenegro) Ljubomir Čelebić (Croatia) Mate Delić (Romania) Dragoș Dima
March 19	Egypt F10 Futures; Sharm El Sheikh, Egypt; Hard $15,000; Singles and doubles draws	(Russia) Roman Safiullin; 6–1, 6–1	(Czech Republic) Jaroslav Pospíšil	(Zimbabwe) Benjamin Lock (Austria) Lucas Miedler	(United Kingdom) Aidan McHugh (Italy) Alessandro Bega (Russia) Anton Zaitcev (Ukraine) Vladyslav Manafov
March 19	Egypt F10 Futures; Sharm El Sheikh, Egypt; Hard $15,000; Singles and doubles draws	(Ukraine) Vladyslav Manafov (Austria) Lucas Miedler; 6–0, 6–2	(Czech Republic) Petr Hájek (Brazil) Igor Marcondes	(Zimbabwe) Benjamin Lock (Austria) Lucas Miedler	(United Kingdom) Aidan McHugh (Italy) Alessandro Bega (Russia) Anton Zaitcev (Ukraine) Vladyslav Manafov
March 19	France F6 Futures; Villers-lès-Nancy, France; Hard (indoor) $15,000; Singles and doubles draws	(Germany) Elmar Ejupovic; 7–5, 6–4	(France) Jules Marie	(France) Dan Added (Russia) Pavel Kotov	(France) Evan Furness (France) Damien Bayard (France) Pierre Faivre (France) Kyrian Jacquet
March 19	France F6 Futures; Villers-lès-Nancy, France; Hard (indoor) $15,000; Singles and doubles draws	(Switzerland) Marc-Andrea Hüsler (France) Hugo Voljacques; 7–6^{(7–4)}, 7–6^{(7–3)}	(France) Dan Added (France) Maxime Tchoutakian	(France) Dan Added (Russia) Pavel Kotov	(France) Evan Furness (France) Damien Bayard (France) Pierre Faivre (France) Kyrian Jacquet
March 19	Greece F4 Futures; Heraklion, Greece; Hard $15,000; Singles and doubles draws	(Germany) Stefan Seifert; 6–7^{(4–7)}, 6–2, 6–2	(Chile) Marcelo Tomás Barrios Vera	(Germany) Rudolf Molleker (France) Baptiste Crepatte	(Slovakia) Patrik Néma (Germany) Jakob Sude (United Kingdom) Jonathan Gray (Russia) Markos Kalovelonis
March 19	Greece F4 Futures; Heraklion, Greece; Hard $15,000; Singles and doubles draws	(United States) Hunter Johnson (United States) Yates Johnson; 6–3, 6–3	(Argentina) Franco Emanuel Egea (Argentina) Mateo Nicolás Martínez	(Germany) Rudolf Molleker (France) Baptiste Crepatte	(Slovakia) Patrik Néma (Germany) Jakob Sude (United Kingdom) Jonathan Gray (Russia) Markos Kalovelonis
March 19	India F4 Futures; Trivandrum, India; Clay $15,000; Singles and doubles draws	(India) Vijay Sundar Prashanth; 6–3, 6–3	(India) Arjun Kadhe	(Spain) Carlos Boluda-Purkiss (Brazil) Thales Turini	(Germany) Sami Reinwein (India) Suraj Prabodh (India) Manish Sureshkumar (India) Abhinav Sanjeev Shanmugam
March 19	India F4 Futures; Trivandrum, India; Clay $15,000; Singles and doubles draws	(India) Arjun Kadhe (India) Vijay Sundar Prashanth; 6–7^{(5–7)}, 6–4, [10–7]	(Brazil) Caio Silva (Brazil) Thales Turini	(Spain) Carlos Boluda-Purkiss (Brazil) Thales Turini	(Germany) Sami Reinwein (India) Suraj Prabodh (India) Manish Sureshkumar (India) Abhinav Sanjeev Shanmugam
March 19	Israel F3 Futures; Tel Aviv, Israel; Hard $15,000; Singles and doubles draws	(Italy) Roberto Marcora; 6–3, 2–6, 6–4	(Belgium) Yannick Vandenbulcke	(Finland) Harri Heliövaara (Czech Republic) David Poljak	(Ukraine) Danylo Kalenichenko (Finland) Patrik Niklas-Salminen (United States) Peter Kobelt (Belgium) Maxime Pauwels
March 19	Israel F3 Futures; Tel Aviv, Israel; Hard $15,000; Singles and doubles draws	(Ukraine) Danylo Kalenichenko (Ukraine) Volodymyr Uzhylovskyi; 7–5, 6–3	(Finland) Harri Heliövaara (Finland) Patrik Niklas-Salminen	(Finland) Harri Heliövaara (Czech Republic) David Poljak	(Ukraine) Danylo Kalenichenko (Finland) Patrik Niklas-Salminen (United States) Peter Kobelt (Belgium) Maxime Pauwels
March 19	Japan F3 Futures; Kōfu, Japan; Hard $15,000; Singles and doubles draws	(South Korea) Hong Seong-chan; 7–6^{(7–2)}, 6–1	(Japan) Makoto Ochi	(Japan) Tatsuma Ito (Japan) Kaito Uesugi	(Japan) Ryota Tanuma (South Korea) Song Min-kyu (Japan) Sho Katayama (Chinese Taipei) Wu Tung-lin
March 19	Japan F3 Futures; Kōfu, Japan; Hard $15,000; Singles and doubles draws	(Japan) Hiroyasu Ehara (Japan) Sho Katayama; 7–5, 7–6^{(7–5)}	(South Korea) Seol Jae-min (South Korea) Song Min-kyu	(Japan) Tatsuma Ito (Japan) Kaito Uesugi	(Japan) Ryota Tanuma (South Korea) Song Min-kyu (Japan) Sho Katayama (Chinese Taipei) Wu Tung-lin
March 19	Spain F7 Futures; Reus, Spain; Clay $15,000; Singles and doubles draws	(Italy) Gian Marco Moroni; 6–3, 6–1	(Spain) Pol Toledo Bagué	(Spain) Jordi Samper Montaña (Brazil) João Menezes	(Czech Republic) Lukáš Rosol (Italy) Raúl Brancaccio (Spain) Javier Barranco Cosano (Spain) Eduard Esteve Lobato
March 19	Spain F7 Futures; Reus, Spain; Clay $15,000; Singles and doubles draws	(Spain) Jaume Pla Malfeito (Russia) Alexander Zhurbin; 4–6, 7–6^{(7–5)}, [13–11]	(Spain) Javier Barranco Cosano (Italy) Raúl Brancaccio	(Spain) Jordi Samper Montaña (Brazil) João Menezes	(Czech Republic) Lukáš Rosol (Italy) Raúl Brancaccio (Spain) Javier Barranco Cosano (Spain) Eduard Esteve Lobato
March 19	Tunisia F11 Futures; Hammamet, Tunisia; Clay $15,000; Singles and doubles draws	(Spain) Oriol Roca Batalla; 7–5, 6–1	(Chile) Juan Carlos Sáez	(Serbia) Miljan Zekić (Argentina) Eduardo Agustín Torre	(France) Samuel Bensoussan (Monaco) Lucas Catarina (Croatia) Duje Kekez (France) Florent Diep
March 19	Tunisia F11 Futures; Hammamet, Tunisia; Clay $15,000; Singles and doubles draws	(Ecuador) Diego Hidalgo (Argentina) Mariano Kestelboim; 6–3, 6–7^{(2–7)}, [10–5]	(North Macedonia) Tomislav Jotovski (Croatia) Duje Kekez	(Serbia) Miljan Zekić (Argentina) Eduardo Agustín Torre	(France) Samuel Bensoussan (Monaco) Lucas Catarina (Croatia) Duje Kekez (France) Florent Diep
March 19	Turkey F11 Futures; Antalya, Turkey; Clay $15,000; Singles and doubles draws	(Russia) Ivan Nedelko; 6–4, 6–1	(Argentina) Genaro Alberto Olivieri	(Germany) Peter Heller (Mexico) Luis Patiño	(Bulgaria) Gabriel Donev (Bulgaria) Alexandar Lazov (Argentina) Juan Pablo Paz (Brazil) Rafael Matos
March 19	Turkey F11 Futures; Antalya, Turkey; Clay $15,000; Singles and doubles draws	(Turkey) Altuğ Çelikbilek (Turkey) Cem İlkel; 1–6, 6–4, [10–8]	(Brazil) Rafael Matos (Brazil) Marcelo Zormann	(Germany) Peter Heller (Mexico) Luis Patiño	(Bulgaria) Gabriel Donev (Bulgaria) Alexandar Lazov (Argentina) Juan Pablo Paz (Brazil) Rafael Matos
March 26	Australia F4 Futures; Mornington, Australia; Clay $25,000; Singles and doubles draws	(Australia) Max Purcell; 7–5, 6–4	(Australia) Marc Polmans	(Australia) Andrew Harris (Australia) Matthew Barton	(Australia) Matthew Dellavedova (Australia) James Frawley (Australia) Blake Ellis (Australia) Andrew Whittington
March 26	Australia F4 Futures; Mornington, Australia; Clay $25,000; Singles and doubles draws	(Australia) Adam Taylor (Australia) Jason Taylor; 7–6^{(7–4)}, 6–0	(Australia) Blake Ellis (Australia) Michael Look	(Australia) Andrew Harris (Australia) Matthew Barton	(Australia) Matthew Dellavedova (Australia) James Frawley (Australia) Blake Ellis (Australia) Andrew Whittington
March 26	Italy F5 Futures; Pula, Italy; Clay $25,000; Singles and doubles draws	(Italy) Lorenzo Giustino; 7–5, 7–5	(Uruguay) Martín Cuevas	(Serbia) Miljan Zekić (Bolivia) Hugo Dellien	(Romania) Bogdan Ionuț Apostol (Croatia) Nino Serdarušić (Austria) Lenny Hampel (Slovakia) Filip Horanský
March 26	Italy F5 Futures; Pula, Italy; Clay $25,000; Singles and doubles draws	(Switzerland) Adrian Bodmer (Netherlands) Mark Vervoort; 7–6^{(7–3)}, 4–6, [12–10]	(Belgium) Maxime Authom (Netherlands) Tallon Griekspoor	(Serbia) Miljan Zekić (Bolivia) Hugo Dellien	(Romania) Bogdan Ionuț Apostol (Croatia) Nino Serdarušić (Austria) Lenny Hampel (Slovakia) Filip Horanský
March 26	Portugal F6 Futures; Lisbon, Portugal; Hard $25,000; Singles and doubles draws	(South Africa) Lloyd Harris; 7–6^{(7–2)}, 7–6^{(7–3)}	(Portugal) Frederico Ferreira Silva	(Czech Republic) Robin Staněk (Spain) Andrés Artuñedo	(Portugal) João Monteiro (Egypt) Karim-Mohamed Maamoun (Spain) Roberto Ortega Olmedo (Belgium) Christopher Heyman
March 26	Portugal F6 Futures; Lisbon, Portugal; Hard $25,000; Singles and doubles draws	(Estonia) Kenneth Raisma (Finland) Emil Ruusuvuori; 7–6^{(7–2)}, 6–2	(Canada) Steven Diez (Spain) Bruno Mardones	(Czech Republic) Robin Staněk (Spain) Andrés Artuñedo	(Portugal) João Monteiro (Egypt) Karim-Mohamed Maamoun (Spain) Roberto Ortega Olmedo (Belgium) Christopher Heyman
March 26	Egypt F11 Futures; Sharm El Sheikh, Egypt; Hard $15,000; Singles and doubles draws	(Austria) Lucas Miedler; 6–3, 7–5	(Russia) Teymuraz Gabashvili	(Italy) Francesco Forti (Austria) Matthias Haim	(Ukraine) Vladyslav Manafov (Russia) Roman Safiullin (United Kingdom) Finn Bass (Czech Republic) Petr Hájek
March 26	Egypt F11 Futures; Sharm El Sheikh, Egypt; Hard $15,000; Singles and doubles draws	(United States) Peter Kobelt (Austria) Lucas Miedler; 7–6^{(7–5)}, 6–4	(Brazil) Igor Marcondes (Ukraine) Vladyslav Orlov	(Italy) Francesco Forti (Austria) Matthias Haim	(Ukraine) Vladyslav Manafov (Russia) Roman Safiullin (United Kingdom) Finn Bass (Czech Republic) Petr Hájek
March 26	Greece F5 Futures; Heraklion, Greece; Hard $15,000; Singles and doubles draws	(France) Yannick Jankovits; 6–4, 6–3	(Chile) Marcelo Tomás Barrios Vera	(Czech Republic) Petr Michnev (Belarus) Yaraslav Shyla	(France) Baptiste Crepatte (Ukraine) Nikita Mashtakov (Germany) Rudolf Molleker (United Kingdom) Jonathan Gray
March 26	Greece F5 Futures; Heraklion, Greece; Hard $15,000; Singles and doubles draws	(Russia) Markos Kalovelonis (Belarus) Yaraslav Shyla; 6–4, 7–6^{(7–5)}	(Italy) Erik Crepaldi (Czech Republic) Petr Michnev	(Czech Republic) Petr Michnev (Belarus) Yaraslav Shyla	(France) Baptiste Crepatte (Ukraine) Nikita Mashtakov (Germany) Rudolf Molleker (United Kingdom) Jonathan Gray
March 26	Japan F4 Futures; Tsukuba, Japan; Hard $15,000; Singles and doubles draws	(Japan) Yosuke Watanuki; 7–5, 6–1	(Japan) Renta Tokuda	(Chinese Taipei) Lee Kuan-yi (Japan) Ryota Tanuma	(Japan) Shintaro Imai (Australia) Jacob Grills (Japan) Sho Katayama (Japan) Hiroyasu Ehara
March 26	Japan F4 Futures; Tsukuba, Japan; Hard $15,000; Singles and doubles draws	(Japan) Hiroyasu Ehara (Japan) Shinji Hazawa; 6–4, 6–0	(Japan) Soichiro Moritani (Japan) Kento Takeuchi	(Chinese Taipei) Lee Kuan-yi (Japan) Ryota Tanuma	(Japan) Shintaro Imai (Australia) Jacob Grills (Japan) Sho Katayama (Japan) Hiroyasu Ehara
March 26	Tunisia F12 Futures; Hammamet, Tunisia; Clay $15,000; Singles and doubles draws	(Argentina) Patricio Heras; 6–2, 6–2	(Argentina) Hernán Casanova	(Argentina) Mariano Kestelboim (Brazil) Orlando Luz	(Argentina) Tomás Lipovšek Puches (Belgium) Clément Geens (Italy) Simone Roncalli (France) Florent Diep
March 26	Tunisia F12 Futures; Hammamet, Tunisia; Clay $15,000; Singles and doubles draws	(Argentina) Hernán Casanova (Argentina) Tomás Lipovšek Puches; 1–6, 6–4, [10–2]	(Argentina) Mariano Kestelboim (Chile) Juan Carlos Sáez	(Argentina) Mariano Kestelboim (Brazil) Orlando Luz	(Argentina) Tomás Lipovšek Puches (Belgium) Clément Geens (Italy) Simone Roncalli (France) Florent Diep
March 26	Turkey F12 Futures; Antalya, Turkey; Clay $15,000; Singles and doubles draws	(Turkey) Cem İlkel; 2–6, 6–2, 6–2	(Serbia) Marko Miladinović	(Turkey) Marsel İlhan (Bulgaria) Dimitar Kuzmanov	(Argentina) Genaro Alberto Olivieri (Germany) Peter Heller (Turkey) Sarp Ağabigün (Argentina) Francisco Cerúndolo
March 26	Turkey F12 Futures; Antalya, Turkey; Clay $15,000; Singles and doubles draws	(Turkey) Cem İlkel (Turkey) Anıl Yüksel; 4–6, 6–2, [10–7]	(Ukraine) Olexiy Kolisnyk (Ukraine) Oleg Prihodko	(Turkey) Marsel İlhan (Bulgaria) Dimitar Kuzmanov	(Argentina) Genaro Alberto Olivieri (Germany) Peter Heller (Turkey) Sarp Ağabigün (Argentina) Francisco Cerúndolo
