= 2021 Bucharest Challenger =

Tennis tournament

- Date: 20–26 September
- Edition: 1st
- Surface: Clay
- Location: Bucharest, Romania

Champions

Singles
- (Czech Republic) Jiří Lehečka

Doubles
- (Philippines) Ruben Gonzales / (United States) Hunter Johnson
Bucharest Challenger	· 2022 →

The 2021 Bucharest Challenger was a professional tennis tournament played on clay courts. It was the 1st edition of the tournament which was part of the 2021 ATP Challenger Tour. It took place in Bucharest, Romania between 20 and 26 September 2021.

== Singles main-draw entrants ==
=== Seeds ===
Country	Player	Rank^{1}	Seed
ITA	Stefano Travaglia	99	1
MDA	Radu Albot	105	2
AUS	Thanasi Kokkinakis	180	3
CZE	Zdeněk Kolář	185	4
IND	Sumit Nagal	186	5
GER	Maximilian Marterer	197	6
CZE	Vít Kopřiva	198	7
CZE	Jiří Lehečka	201	8

- ^{1} Rankings are as of 13 September 2021.

=== Other entrants ===
The following players received wildcards into the singles main draw:

- (Romania) Nicolae Frunză
- (Romania) David Ionel
- (Romania) Ștefan Paloși

The following players received entry into the singles main draw as alternates:

- (Romania) Filip Jianu
- (Russia) Alexey Vatutin

The following players received entry from the qualifying draw:

- (Italy) Matteo Arnaldi
- (Russia) Ivan Gakhov
- (France) Calvin Hemery
- (Sweden) Dragoș Nicolae Mădăraș

== Champions ==
=== Singles ===
- (Czech Republic) Jiří Lehečka def. (Slovakia) Filip Horanský 6–3, 6–2.

=== Doubles ===
- (Philippines) Ruben Gonzales / (United States) Hunter Johnson def. (Germany) Maximilian Marterer / (Czech Republic) Lukáš Rosol 1–6, 6–2, [10–3].
