= 2021 Bucharest Challenger – Doubles =

Doubles
- 2021 Bucharest Challenger

Final
- Champions: (Philippines) Ruben Gonzales (United States) Hunter Johnson
- Runners-up: (Germany) Maximilian Marterer (Czech Republic) Lukáš Rosol
- Score: 1–6, 6–2, [10–3]

Events
Singles	Doubles
- Bucharest Challenger

This was the first edition of the tournament.

Ruben Gonzales and Hunter Johnson won the title after defeating Maximilian Marterer and Lukáš Rosol 1–6, 6–2, [10–3] in the final.

== Seeds ==
1. (United States) James Cerretani / (Switzerland) Luca Margaroli (semifinals)
2. (Austria) Alexander Erler / (Austria) Lucas Miedler (quarterfinals)
3. (Philippines) Ruben Gonzales / (United States) Hunter Johnson (champions)
4. (Ukraine) Vitaliy Sachko / (Croatia) Nino Serdarušić (withdrew)

== Draw ==
Key

- Q = Qualifier
- WC = Wild card
- LL = Lucky loser
- Alt = Alternate
- ITF = ITF entry
- PR = Protected ranking
- SR = Special ranking
- SE = Special exempt
- JE = Junior exempt
- JR = Junior Accelerator Programme entrant
- CO = College Accelerator Programme entrant
- NG = Next Gen Accelerator Program entrant
- w/o = Walkover
- r = Retired
- d = Defaulted

First round
1	(United States) J Cerretani (Switzerland) L Margaroli	7	6
(Russia) T Gabashvili (Netherlands) G Smits	5	2
(Italy) F Cobolli (Italy) J Ocleppo	7^{9}	6
WC	(Romania) M Copil (Romania) A Ungur	6^{7}	1
Alt	(Belarus) U Ignatik (Sweden) DN Mădăraș	5	7	[10]
(Czech Republic) V Kopřiva (Czech Republic) J Lehečka	7	5	[4]
(Germany) M Marterer (Czech Republic) L Rosol	6	6
Alt	(France) G Blancaneaux (Ukraine) V Orlov	3	3
(Moldova) R Albot (Moldova) A Cozbinov	7^{7}	4	[10]
(United Kingdom) J Clarke (Netherlands) J Sels	6^{4}	6	[4]
WC	(Romania) ND Ionel (Romania) FC Jianu	1	5
3	(Philippines) R Gonzales (United States) H Johnson	6	7
PR	(Italy) A Motti (Russia) A Vatutin	6	6^{3}	[3]
WC	(Romania) A Jecan (Romania) Dan Alexandru Tomescu	4	7^{7}	[10]
(Italy) R Bonadio (Italy) S Travaglia	3	3
2	(Austria) A Erler (Austria) L Miedler	6	6

Quarterfinals
1	(United States) J Cerretani (Switzerland) L Margaroli	6	7^{10}
(Italy) F Cobolli (Italy) J Ocleppo	4	6^{8}
Alt	(Belarus) U Ignatik (Sweden) DN Mădăraș	6^{4}	3
(Germany) M Marterer (Czech Republic) L Rosol	7^{7}	6
(Moldova) R Albot (Moldova) A Cozbinov	3	7^{7}	[6]
3	(Philippines) R Gonzales (United States) H Johnson	6	6^{2}	[10]
WC	(Romania) A Jecan (Romania) DA Tomescu	0	6	[11]
2	(Austria) A Erler (Austria) L Miedler	6	4	[9]

Semifinals
1	(United States) J Cerretani (Switzerland) L Margaroli	3	6	[3]
(Germany) M Marterer (Czech Republic) L Rosol	6	3	[10]
3	(Philippines) R Gonzales (United States) H Johnson	6	7^{7}
WC	(Romania) A Jecan (Romania) DA Tomescu	4	6^{4}

Final
(Germany) M Marterer (Czech Republic) L Rosol	6	2	[3]
3	(Philippines) R Gonzales (United States) H Johnson	1	6	[10]
