= 2021 Bucharest Challenger – Singles =

Singles
- 2021 Bucharest Challenger

Final
- Champion: (Czech Republic) Jiří Lehečka
- Runner-up: (Slovakia) Filip Horanský
- Score: 6–3, 6–2

Events
Singles	Doubles
Bucharest Challenger	· 2022 →

This was the first edition of the tournament.

Jiří Lehečka won the title after defeating Filip Horanský 6–3, 6–2 in the final.

== Seeds ==
1. (Italy) Stefano Travaglia (semifinals)
2. (Moldova) Radu Albot (second round)
3. (Australia) Thanasi Kokkinakis (quarterfinals)
4. (Czech Republic) Zdeněk Kolář (first round)
5. (India) Sumit Nagal (first round)
6. (Germany) Maximilian Marterer (second round)
7. (Czech Republic) Vít Kopřiva (second round)
8. (Czech Republic) Jiří Lehečka (champion)

== Draw ==
=== Key ===
- Q = Qualifier
- WC = Wild card
- LL = Lucky loser
- Alt = Alternate
- SE = Special exempt
- PR = Protected ranking
- ITF = ITF entry
- JE = Junior exempt
- w/o = Walkover
- r = Retired
- d = Defaulted
- SR = Special ranking

=== Finals ===
Semifinals
1	(Italy) Stefano Travaglia	3	6^{3}
8	(Czech Republic) Jiří Lehečka	6	7^{7}
(Slovakia) Filip Horanský	6	4	6
(Italy) Lorenzo Giustino	3	6	2

Final
8	(Czech Republic) Jiří Lehečka	6	6
(Slovakia) Filip Horanský	3	2

=== Top half ===
First round
1	(Italy) S Travaglia	6	6
(Czech Republic) L Rosol	4	3
(Italy) F Cobolli	7	6^{6}	6
Q	(Russia) I Gakhov	5	7^{8}	1
(Ukraine) V Sachko	6	6
(Austria) A Erler	2	2
(Austria) L Miedler	3	1
6	(Germany) M Marterer	6	6
4	(Czech Republic) Z Kolář	5	4
(Russia) T Gabashvili	7	6
WC	(Romania) ND Ionel	7^{7}	6
WC	(Romania) Ștefan Paloși	6^{5}	1
Q	(Sweden) DN Mădăraș	6	6
Alt	(Romania) FC Jianu	4	3
Alt	(Russia) A Vatutin	3	1
8	(Czech Republic) J Lehečka	6	6

Second round
1	(Italy) S Travaglia	2	6	6
(Italy) F Cobolli	6	4	2
(Ukraine) V Sachko	6	2	7^{7}
6	(Germany) M Marterer	3	6	6^{0}
(Russia) T Gabashvili	3	3
WC	(Romania) ND Ionel	6	6
Q	(Sweden) DN Mădăraș	1	2
8	(Czech Republic) J Lehečka	6	6

Quarterfinals
1	(Italy) S Travaglia	6	6
(Ukraine) V Sachko	3	4
WC	(Romania) ND Ionel	4	4
8	(Czech Republic) J Lehečka	6	6

Semifinals
1	(Italy) S Travaglia	3	6^{3}
8	(Czech Republic) J Lehečka	6	7^{7}

=== Bottom half ===
First round
7	(Czech Republic) V Kopřiva	6	6
(Romania) M Copil	4	4
WC	(Romania) N Frunză	6^{3}	4
(Slovakia) F Horanský	7^{7}	6
Q	(France) C Hemery	6	6
(Netherlands) J Sels	4	4
(Croatia) D Ajduković	1	1^{r}
3	(Australia) T Kokkinakis	6	3
5	(India) S Nagal	6	5	5
(Italy) L Giustino	3	7	7
(France) G Blancaneaux	4	5
Q	(Italy) M Arnaldi	6	7
(Italy) R Bonadio	6^{5}	7^{7}	6
(United Kingdom) J Clarke	7^{7}	6^{4}	2
(Croatia) N Serdarušić	2	5
2	(Moldova) R Albot	6	7

Second round
7	(Czech Republic) V Kopřiva	3	4
(Slovakia) F Horanský	6	6
Q	(France) C Hemery	6	6^{4}	6^{4}
3	(Australia) T Kokkinakis	2	7^{7}	7^{7}
(Italy) L Giustino	2	7	6
Q	(Italy) M Arnaldi	6	5	4
(Italy) R Bonadio	6	6
2	(Moldova) R Albot	3	3

Quarterfinals
(Slovakia) F Horanský	7^{7}	4	6
3	(Australia) T Kokkinakis	6^{5}	6	2
(Italy) L Giustino	6	6
(Italy) R Bonadio	2	3

Semifinals
(Slovakia) F Horanský	6	4	6
(Italy) L Giustino	3	6	2
