= Yates Johnson =

American tennis player

- Country (sports): United States
- Residence: New Braunfels, Texas, U.S.
- Born: 2 June 1994 (age 32) Taos, New Mexico, U.S.
- Height: 1.80 m (5 ft 11 in)
- Plays: Right-handed (two-handed backhand)
- Prize money: $33,618

Singles
- Career record: 0–0 (at ATP Tour level, Grand Slam level, and in Davis Cup)
- Career titles: 0; 0 Challenger, 0 Futures

Doubles
- Career record: 0–1 (at ATP Tour level, Grand Slam level, and in Davis Cup)
- Career titles: 0; 0 Challenger, 12 Futures
- Highest ranking: No. 249 (24 February 2020)

Yates Johnson (born 2 June 1994) is an American tennis player and major league pickleball player.

Johnson has a career high ATP doubles ranking of World No. 249 achieved on 24 February 2020.

Johnson made his ATP main draw debut at the 2021 Delray Beach Open on hard course in Florida, where he was granted entry into the main doubles draw partnering his twin brother Hunter Johnson. They were defeated in the first round by another American duo Christian Harrison and Ryan Harrison in straight sets 2–6, 2–6.

Johnson has reached 20 career doubles finals, with a record of 12 wins and 8 losses all coming at the ITF Futures level. He has yet to reach a final in singles at any level.

== ATP Challenger and ITF Futures finals ==
=== Doubles: 20 (12–8) ===
| Legend ATP Challenger (0–0) ITF Futures (12–8) | Finals by surface Hard (6–5) Clay (6–3) Grass (0–0) Carpet (0–0) |

| Result | W–L | Date | Tournament | Tier | Surface | Partner | Opponents | Score |
|---|---|---|---|---|---|---|---|---|
| Win | 1–0 | Jul 2015 | Belgium F4, De Haan | Futures | Clay | (United States) Hunter Johnson | (Monaco) Romain Arneodo (Republic of Ireland) Sam Barry | 6–4, 4–6, [10–3] |
| Loss | 1–1 | Jul 2016 | Belgium F5, Middelkerke | Futures | Hard | (United States) Hunter Johnson | (Belgium) Ruben Bemelmans (Belgium) Yannick Mertens | 1–6, 1–6 |
| Loss | 1–2 | Jul 2016 | Belgium F6, Knokke | Futures | Clay | (United States) Hunter Johnson | (Belgium) Joran Vliegen (Belgium) Sander Gillé | 4–6, 4–6 |
| Win | 2–2 | Oct 2016 | USA F30, Fountain Valley | Futures | Hard | (United States) Hunter Johnson | (Austria) Sebastian Bader (Germany) S Fanselow | 6–4, 7–5 |
| Win | 3–2 | Nov 2016 | USA F35, Birmingham | Futures | Clay | (United States) Hunter Johnson | (United States) Austin Smith (United States) Alex Lawson | 6–2, 6–4 |
| Loss | 3–3 | Oct 2017 | Italy F32, Santa Margherita Di Pula | Futures | Clay | (United States) Hunter Johnson | (Italy) Walter Trusendi (Italy) Andrea Vavassori | 6–7^{(3–7)}, 3–6 |
| Win | 4–3 | Oct 2017 | USA F34, Harlingen | Futures | Hard | (United States) Hunter Johnson | (United States) Harrison Adams (United States) Shane Vinsant | 7–6^{(7–2)}, 6–3 |
| Win | 5–3 | Nov 2017 | USA F37, Pensacola | Futures | Clay | (United States) Hunter Johnson | (United States) Harrison Adams (United States) Junior Alexander Ore | 6–3, 6–3 |
| Win | 6–3 | Mar 2018 | Greece F4, Heraklion | Futures | Hard | (United States) Hunter Johnson | (Argentina) F Emanuel Egea (Argentina) M Nicolas Martinez | 6–3, 6–3 |
| Win | 7–3 | May 2018 | Mexico F3, Córdoba | Futures | Hard | (United States) Hunter Johnson | (Australia) Edward Bourchier (Peru) Alexander Merino | 6–3, 6–3 |
| Loss | 7–4 | Jul 2018 | USA F19, Wichita | Futures | Hard | (United States) Hunter Johnson | (United States) Brandon Holt (France) Maxime Cressy | 6–3, 2–6, [6–10] |
| Loss | 7–5 | Sep 2018 | USA F25, Laguna Niguel | Futures | Hard | (United States) Hunter Johnson | (United States) Nicolas Meister (United States) Martin Redlicki | 4–6, 6–3, [6–10] |
| Win | 8–5 | Apr 2019 | M25 Sunderland, United Kingdom | World Tennis Tour | Hard | (United States) Hunter Johnson | (United Kingdom) Scott Duncan (Republic of Ireland) Peter Bothwell | 6–4, 6–3 |
| Win | 9–5 | Apr 2019 | M25 Santa Margherita Di Pula, Italy | World Tennis Tour | Clay | (United States) Hunter Johnson | (Romania) M-A Jecan (Romania) Victor Vlad Cornea | 6–3, 6–7^{(2–7)}, [10–5] |
| Win | 10–5 | Jul 2019 | M25 Lasne, Belgium | World Tennis Tour | Clay | (United States) Hunter Johnson | (Peru) Sergio Galdós (Argentina) Facundo Mena | 6–3, 7–6^{(7–5)} |
| Loss | 10–6 | Aug 2019 | M25 Schlieren, Switzerland | World Tennis Tour | Clay | (United States) Hunter Johnson | (Czech Republic) David Škoch (Czech Republic) Petr Nouza | 5–7, 3–6 |
| Loss | 10–7 | Oct 2019 | M25 Norman, United States | World Tennis Tour | Hard | (United States) Hunter Johnson | (United Kingdom) Lloyd Glasspool (United States) Sekou Bangoura | 6–7^{(9–11)}, 2–6 |
| Win | 11–7 | Oct 2019 | M25 Fort Worth, United States | World Tennis Tour | Hard | (United States) Hunter Johnson | (United States) Charlie Emhardt (United States) Alfredo Perez | 6–2, 6–4 |
| Win | 12–7 | Feb 2021 | M25 Naples, United States | World Tennis Tour | Clay | (United States) Hunter Johnson | (Colombia) Alejandro Gomez (United States) Junior Alexander Ore | 6–1, 1–6, [12–10] |
| Loss | 12–8 | Apr 2021 | M25 Reus, Spain | World Tennis Tour | Clay | (United States) Hunter Johnson | (France) Arthur Fils (France) Giovanni Mpetshi Perricard | 4–6, 5–7 |
