= Junior Alexander Ore =

American tennis player

- Full name: Israel Alexander Ore
- Country (sports): United States
- Born: September 8, 1992 (age 33) Gaithersburg, Maryland, U.S.
- Height: 1.78 m (5 ft 10 in)
- Plays: Left-handed (one handed-backhand)
- College: Texas A&M University
- Coach: Rich Reyes
- Prize money: $43,448

Singles
- Career record: 0–0 (at ATP Tour level, Grand Slam level, and in Davis Cup)
- Career titles: 0; 0 Challenger, 0 Futures
- Highest ranking: No. 737 (23 July 2018)

Doubles
- Career record: 0–1 (at ATP Tour level, Grand Slam level, and in Davis Cup)
- Career titles: 0; 0 Challenger, 20 Futures
- Highest ranking: No. 269 (16 March 2020)

Junior Alexander Ore (born Israel Alexander Ore; September 8, 1992) is an American tennis player. He has a career high ATP singles ranking of World No. 737 achieved on 23 July 2018 and a career high ATP doubles ranking of World No. 269 achieved on 16 March 2020. Ore has reached 32 career doubles finals, with a record of 20 wins and 12 losses all coming at the ITF level. On the junior tour, Ore had a career high junior ranking of 19, achieved in February 2010.

== Professional career ==
Ore made his ATP Tour main draw debut at the 2008 Washington Open on hard courts in the US, where he was given a wild card entry into the doubles main draw alongside compatriot Denis Kudla. They were defeated handily in the first round by Argentine duo Lucas Arnold Ker and Eduardo Schwank in straight sets 1–6, 1–6.

== ATP Challenger and ITF Futures finals ==
=== Doubles: 32 (20–12) ===
Legend ATP Challenger (0–0) ITF Futures (20–12)	Finals by surface Hard (8–4) Clay (12–8) Grass (0–0) Carpet (0–0)

Result	W–L	Date	Tournament	Tier	Surface	Partner	Opponents	Score
Loss	0–1	May 2010	USA F11, Orange Park	Futures	Clay	(United States) Mitchell Frank	(United States) Andrea Collarini (United States) Denis Kudla	6–7^{(6–8)}, 3–6
Win	1–1	May 2010	USA F12, Tampa	Futures	Clay	(United States) Denis Kudla	(Brazil) Clayton Almeida (United States) Blake Strode	4–6, 6–3, [10–8]
Win	2–1	Sep 2014	USA F25, Costa Mesa	Futures	Hard	(United States) Hunter Nicholas	(United States) Mackenzie McDonald (United States) Martin Redlicki	4–6, 6–4, [10–8]
Loss	2–2	Sep 2014	USA F26, Irvine	Futures	Hard	(Australia) Carsten Ball	(Australia) Greg Jones (United States) Gregory Ouellette	2–6, 6–4, [5–10]
Loss	2–3	Sep 2015	USA F26, Claremont	Futures	Hard	(United States) Hunter Nicholas	(United States) Jean-Yves Aubone (United States) Gonzales Austin	5–7, 6–3, [6–10]
Loss	2–4	Oct 2015	USA F28, Laguna Niguel	Futures	Hard	(United States) Will Spencer	(United States) Brandon Holt (United States) Riley Smith	4–6, 3–6
Win	3–4	Jan 2016	USA F5, Weston	Futures	Clay	(United States) Hunter Reese	(Japan) Kaichi Uchida (Sweden) Isak Arvidsson	7–6^{(7–4)}, 3–6, [10–8]
Loss	3–5	Feb 2016	USA F7, Plantation	Futures	Clay	(South Africa) Damon Gooch	(Argentina) Patricio Heras (Brazil) Caio Zampieri	6–7^{(4–7)}, 1–6
Win	4–5	Jul 2017	Egypt F18, Sharm El Sheikh	Futures	Hard	(Egypt) Youssef Hossam	(Ukraine) Marat Deviatiarov (Egypt) Issam Haitham Taweel	6–2, 6–3
Win	5–5	Jul 2017	Egypt F21, Sharm El Sheikh	Futures	Hard	(United States) Michael Zhu	(United Kingdom) Julian Cash (United States) Tyler Mercier	6–2, 6–3
Loss	5–6	Sep 2017	Canada F6, Toronto	Futures	Clay	(United States) Harrison Adams	(United States) Deiton Baughman (United States) Dennis Nevolo	5–7, 2–6
Loss	5–7	Nov 2017	USA F37, Pensacola	Futures	Clay	(United States) Harrison Adams	(United States) Hunter Johnson (United States) Yates Johnson	3–6, 3–6
Win	6–7	Dec 2017	Peru F2, Lima	Futures	Clay	(Peru) Jorge Brian Panta	(Bolivia) Boris Arias (Bolivia) Federico Zeballos	6–1, 7–5
Loss	6–8	Jan 2018	USA F4, Sunrise	Futures	Clay	(Colombia) J M Benitez Chavarriaga	(France) Maxime Chazal (Belgium) Julien Cagnina	6–1, 5–7, [4–10]
Win	7–8	Apr 2018	USA F12, Vero Beach	Futures	Clay	(United States) Miles Seemann	(United States) Harrison Adams (United States) Nick Chappell	4–6, 7–6^{(10–8)}, [10–6]
Win	8–8	May 2018	Mexico F2, Mexico City	Futures	Hard	(Peru) Jorge Brian Panta	(United States) Miles Seemann (United States) Harrison Adams	6–3, 6–7^{(1–7)}, [10–6]
Win	9–8	Jul 2018	USA F18, Pittsburgh	Futures	Clay	(Argentina) Mateo Nicolas Martinez	(Colombia) Alejandro Gómez (Ecuador) Emilio Gómez	7–5, 6–2
Loss	9–9	Sep 2018	Canada F6, Niagara	Futures	Hard	(United States) Harrison Adams	(United States) Charlie Emhardt (United States) S Shropshire	5–7, 6–1, [3–10]
Win	10–9	Oct 2018	Peru F3, Lima	Futures	Clay	(Peru) Jorge Brian Panta	(Argentina) M Pena Lopez (Argentina) G A Olivieri	6–3, 6–3
Win	11–9	Jan 2019	M25 Palm Coast, United States	World Tennis Tour	Clay	(Colombia) Alejandro Gómez	(Peru) Nicolas Alvarez (Mexico) Luis Patina	7–6^{(7–2)}, 6–3
Win	12–9	Mar 2019	M15 Cancún, Mexico	World Tennis Tour	Hard	(United States) Harrison Adams	(Brazil) J L Reis daSilva (Brazil) F Yamacita	6–4, 6–4
Loss	12–10	Apr 2019	M15 Orange Park, United States	World Tennis Tour	Clay	(United States) Harrison Adams	(Argentina) Agustín Velotti (Argentina) J I Galarza	6–7^{(6–8)}, 7–6^{(7–3)}, [5–10]
Win	13–10	May 2019	M25 Pensacola, United States	World Tennis Tour	Clay	(Colombia) Alejandro Gómez	(United States) Ian Dempster (United States) Korey Lovett	4–6, 7–6^{(7–4)}, [10–6]
Win	14–10	Jun 2019	M25 Montauban, France	World Tennis Tour	Clay	(Colombia) Alejandro Gómez	(France) Dan Added (Brazil) Thiago Seyboth Wild	6–2, 6–2
Win	15–10	Jul 2019	M25 Bakio, Spain	World Tennis Tour	Hard	(Colombia) Alejandro Gómez	(United States) Alafia Ayeni (Spain) C S Jover	1–6, 6–2, [11–9]
Win	16–10	Jul 2019	M25 Getxo, Spain	World Tennis Tour	Clay	(Colombia) Alejandro Gómez	(Spain) S M Gornes (Spain) J P Malfeito	6–2, 6–7^{(5–7)}, [10–6]
Loss	16–11	Jul 2019	M25 Gandia, Spain	World Tennis Tour	Clay	(Colombia) Alejandro Gómez	(France) Hugo Gaston (France) Jonathan Eysseric	4–6, 6–1, [4–10]
Win	17–11	Sep 2019	M25 Madrid, Spain	World Tennis Tour	Clay	(Colombia) Alejandro Gómez	(Bolivia) Boris Arias (Argentina) M P Lopez	6–0, 6–4
Win	18–11	Nov 2019	M25 Malibu, United States	World Tennis Tour	Hard	(Colombia) Alejandro Gómez	(United States) Austin Rapp (United States) Martin Redlicki	6–3, 6–7^{(14–16)}, [10–7]
Win	19–11	Mar 2020	M25 Las Vegas, United States	World Tennis Tour	Hard	(Colombia) Nicolás Barrientos	(United States) Nick Chappell (United States) Reese Stalder	7–6^{(7–1)}, 6–3
Loss	19–12	Feb 2021	M25 Naples, United States	World Tennis Tour	Clay	(Colombia) Alejandro Gómez	(United States) Hunter Johnson (United States) Yates Johnson	1–6, 6–1, [10–12]
Win	20–12	Feb 2021	M25 Naples, United States	World Tennis Tour	Clay	(Colombia) Alejandro Gómez	(Ecuador) Diego Hidalgo (Colombia) Cristian Rodríguez	6–4, 7–6^{(9–7)}
