= Bucharest Challenger =

- 2021 Bucharest Challenger

ATP Challenger Tour
- Event name: Bucharest Challenger
- Location: Bucharest, Romania
- Category: ATP Challenger Tour
- Surface: Clay
- Draw: 32S/32Q/16D

The Bucharest Challenger is a professional tennis tournament played on clay courts. It is currently part of the ATP Challenger Tour. It is held annually in Bucharest, Romania since 2021.

== Past finals ==
=== Singles ===
Year	Champion	Runner-up	Score
2021	(Czech Republic) Jiří Lehečka	(Slovakia) Filip Horanský	6–3, 6–2

=== Doubles ===
Year	Champions	Runners-up	Score
2021	(Philippines) Ruben Gonzales (United States) Hunter Johnson	(Germany) Maximilian Marterer (Czech Republic) Lukáš Rosol	1–6, 6–2, [10–3]
