= Filip Horanský =

Slovak tennis player

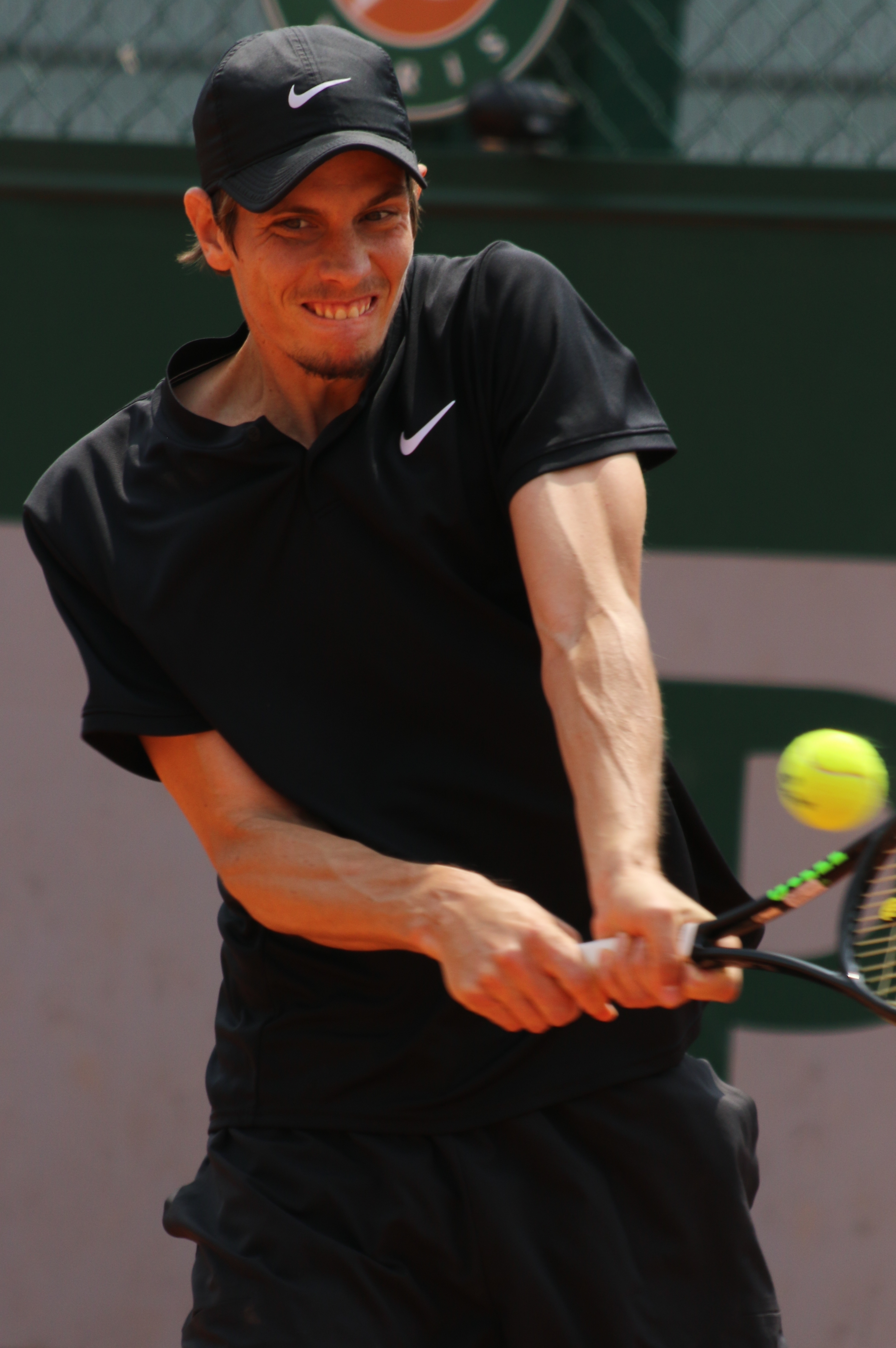
- Horanský at the 2019 French Open
- Country (sports): Slovakia
- Residence: Piešťany, Slovakia
- Born: 7 January 1993 (age 33) Piešťany, Slovakia
- Height: 1.91 m (6 ft 3 in)
- Turned pro: 2012
- Retired: 2023
- Plays: Right Handed (Double Handed Backhand)
- Coach: Karol Kučera
- Prize money: US $563,612

Singles
- Career record: 2–9 (ATP Tour level, Grand Slam level, and Davis Cup)
- Career titles: 0
- Highest ranking: No. 161 (20 May 2019)

Grand Slam singles results
- Australian Open: Q3 (2022)
- French Open: Q2 (2020, 2021)
- Wimbledon: Q1 (2019, 2021, 2022)
- US Open: Q2 (2021)

Doubles
- Career record: 0–0 (ATP Tour level, Grand Slam level, and Davis Cup)
- Career titles: 0
- Highest ranking: No. 431 (9 May 2022)
Medal record
Men's tennis
Representing Slovakia
Youth Olympic Games
Bronze medal – third place	2010 Singapore	Doubles

Filip Horanský (Slovak pronunciation: [ˈfilib ˈɦɔranskiː]; born 7 January 1993) is a Slovak former professional tennis player. He has a career-high ATP singles ranking of No. 161 achieved on 20 May 2019 and a doubles ranking of No. 431 achieved on 9 May 2022.

== Junior career ==
Filip, with partner Jiří Veselý, won the 2011 Boys Doubles Australian Open. He also won the bronze medal in doubles at 2010 Summer Youth Olympics, partnering Jozef Kovalík.

== Professional career ==
=== 2018 ===
At 2018 Lyon Open, Horanský qualified for the first time into the main draw of an ATP event and he also earned his first win at this level, defeating João Sousa. In second round, he lost to Dušan Lajović in straight sets. Horanský then qualified into the main draw in Antalya, where he lost again to Lajović.

== Grand Slam singles performance timeline ==
Key
W	F	SF	QF	#R	RR	Q#	P#	DNQ	A	Z#	PO	G	S	B	NMS	NTI	P	NH

(W) winner; (F) finalist; (SF) semifinalist; (QF) quarterfinalist; (#R) rounds 4, 3, 2, 1; (RR) round-robin stage; (Q#) qualification round; (P#) preliminary round; (DNQ) did not qualify; (A) absent; (Z#) Davis/Fed Cup Zonal Group (with number indication) or (PO) play-off; (G) gold, (S) silver or (B) bronze Olympic/Paralympic medal; (NMS) not a Masters tournament; (NTI) not a Tier I tournament; (P) postponed; (NH) not held; (SR) strike rate (events won / competed); (W–L) win–loss record.
To avoid confusion and double counting, these charts are updated at the conclusion of a tournament or when the player's participation has ended.

== Challenger and Futures finals ==
=== Singles: 25 (12 titles, 13 runner-ups) ===
Legend (singles) ATP Challenger Tour (1–4) ITF Futures Tour (11–9)	Titles by surface Hard (3–1) Clay (9–12) Grass (0–0) Carpet (0–0)

Result	W–L	Date	Tournament	Tier	Surface	Opponent	Score
Loss	0–1	May 2013	Kazakhstan F5, Almaty	Futures	Clay	(Russia) Mikhail Biryukov	6–1, 1–6, 4–6
Loss	0–2	Apr 2014	Kazakhstan F5, Shymkent	Futures	Clay	(Georgia (country)) Aleksandre Metreveli	4–6, 3–6
Win	1–2	Jul 2014	Romania F7, Bascov	Futures	Clay	(Portugal) Vasco Mensurado	6–4, 7–5
Win	2–2	Jul 2014	Romania F8, Curtea de Argeș	Futures	Clay	(Romania) Dragoș Dima	6–4, 6–4
Loss	2–3	Aug 2014	Romania F11, Iași	Futures	Clay	(Barbados) Darian King	6–7^{(8–10)}, 0–6
Win	3–3	Aug 2014	Romania F12, Mediaș	Futures	Clay	(Italy) Stefano Napolitano	4–6, 7–6^{(7–4)}, 6–2
Win	4–3	Apr 2015	Tunisia F15, El Kantaoui	Futures	Hard	(Belgium) Christopher Heyman	6–4, 6–2
Win	5–3	Jul 2015	Belgium F5, Nieuwpoort	Futures	Clay	(France) Yanais Laurent	6–4, 6–2
Win	6–3	Jul 2015	Romania F10, Pitești	Futures	Clay	(Romania) Dragoș Dima	6–7^{(2–7)}, 6–2, 6–4
Loss	6–4	Aug 2015	Slovakia F3, Piešťany	Futures	Clay	(Belarus) Uladzimir Ignatik	3–6, 5–7
Win	7–4	Mar 2016	Turkey F6, Antalya	Futures	Hard	(Switzerland) Yann Marti	6–1, 6–1
Loss	7–5	May 2016	Algeria F3, Algiers	Futures	Clay	(France) Sadio Doumbia	2–6, 4–6
Loss	7–6	Jun 2016	Russia F1, Moscow	Futures	Clay	(Kazakhstan) Alexander Bublik	3–6, 6–7^{(5–7)}
Loss	7–7	Jul 2016	Germany F6, Saarlouis	Futures	Clay	(Germany) Marvin Netuschil	2–6, 4–6
Win	8–7	Feb 2017	Great Britain F1, Glasgow	Futures	Hard (i)	(France) Hugo Grenier	6–2, 6–3
Loss	8–8	May 2017	Hungary F3, Balatonalmádi	Futures	Clay	(Germany) Pascal Meis	3–6, 4–6
Win	9–8	Jul 2017	Austria F3, Wels	Futures	Clay	(Austria) Matthias Haim	6–3, 6–3
Win	10–8	Aug 2017	Slovakia F3, Bratislava	Futures	Clay	(Slovakia) Lukáš Klein	6–4, 6–4
Win	11–8	Aug 2017	Switzerland F3, Collonge-Bellerive	Futures	Clay	(Bulgaria) Aleksandar Lazov	6–2, 6–0
Loss	11–9	May 2018	Hungary F1, Zalaegerszeg	Futures	Clay	(Hungary) Máté Valkusz	1–6, 3–6
Win	12–9	Aug 2018	Meerbusch, Germany	Challenger	Clay	(Germany) Jan Choinski	6–7^{(7–9)}, 6–3, 6–3
Loss	12–10	Jul 2019	Ludwigshafen, Germany	Challenger	Clay	(Germany) Yannick Hanfmann	3–6, 1–6
Loss	12–11	Aug 2019	Sopot, Poland	Challenger	Clay	(Italy) Stefano Travaglia	4–6, 6–2, 2–6
Loss	12–12	Jan 2021	Quimper, France	Challenger	Hard (i)	(United States) Sebastian Korda	1–6, 1–6
Loss	12–13	Sep 2021	Bucharest, Romania	Challenger	Clay	(Czech Republic) Jiří Lehečka	3–6, 2–6

=== Doubles: 11 (4 titles, 7 runner-ups) ===
Legend (doubles) ATP Challenger Tour (0–0) ITF Futures Tour (4–7)	Titles by surface Hard (3–1) Clay (1–5) Grass (0–0) Carpet (0–1)

Result	W–L	Date	Tournament	Tier	Surface	Partner	Opponents	Score
Loss	0–1	May 2012	Bosnia & Herzegovina F3, Brčko	Futures	Clay	(Bosnia and Herzegovina) Aldin Šetkić	(Croatia) Nikola Mektić (Croatia) Ante Pavić	1–6, 3–6
Loss	0–2	Aug 2012	Slovakia F2, Tatranská Lomnica	Futures	Clay	(Slovakia) Filip Vittek	(Czech Republic) Jan Blecha (Czech Republic) Daniel Lustig	1–6, 6–7^{(5–7)}
Loss	0–3	Oct 2012	Turkey F39, Antalya	Futures	Hard	(Slovakia) Filip Vittek	(Czech Republic) Lubomír Majšajdr (Czech Republic) Ondřej Vaculík	6–7^{(1–7)}, 4–6
Win	1–3	Oct 2013	Turkey F42, Antalya	Futures	Hard	(Netherlands) Matwé Middelkoop	(Ukraine) Danylo Kalenichenko (Slovakia) Adrian Partl	6–4, 6–3
Loss	1–4	Mar 2014	Egypt F10, Sharm El Sheikh	Futures	Clay	(Switzerland) Stefan Fiacan	(Egypt) Sherif Sabry (Egypt) Mohamed Safwat	6–4, 3–6, [6–10]
Win	2–4	Apr 2015	Tunisia F14, El Kantaoui	Futures	Hard	(Ukraine) Vadym Ursu	(Argentina) Gregorio Cordonnier (United States) Jordan Dyke	6–4, 6–2
Win	3–4	Aug 2015	Slovakia F3, Piešťany	Futures	Clay	(Slovakia) Igor Zelenay	(Sweden) Isak Arvidsson (Hungary) Gábor Borsos	6–4, 1–6, [15–13]
Loss	3–5	Nov 2015	Estonia F2, Tartu	Futures	Carpet (i)	(Czech Republic) Petr Michnev	(Latvia) Miķelis Lībietis (Belarus) Dzmitry Zhyrmont	6–7^{(2–7)}, 6–3, [4–10]
Win	4–5	Nov 2016	Norway F3, Oslo	Futures	Hard (i)	(Canada) Martin Beran	(Austria) Lucas Miedler (Italy) Gianluigi Quinzi	6–3, 2–6, [10–4]
Loss	4–6	Aug 2017	Slovakia F3, Bratislava	Futures	Clay	(Slovakia) Marek Semjan	(Ukraine) Olexiy Kolisnyk (Ukraine) Oleg Prihodko	6–7^{(5–7)}, 5–7
Loss	4–7	Aug 2017	Turkey F31, Istanbul	Futures	Clay	(Tunisia) Anis Ghorbel	(Netherlands) Sidney de Boer (Netherlands) Tallon Griekspoor	4–6, 6–7^{(3–7)}
