= Hunter Johnson (tennis) =

American tennis and pickleball player (born 1994)

- Country (sports): United States
- Residence: New Braunfels, Texas
- Born: 2 June 1994 (age 32) Taos, United States
- Height: 1.85 m (6 ft 1 in)
- Plays: Right-handed (two-handed backhand)
- Coach: Jeff Johnson
- Prize money: $44,544

Singles
- Career record: 0–0 (at ATP Tour level, Grand Slam level, and in Davis Cup)
- Career titles: 0; 0 Challenger. 0 Futures
- Highest ranking: No. 1,470 (24 October 2016)

Doubles
- Career record: 0–2 (at ATP Tour level, Grand Slam level, and in Davis Cup)
- Career titles: 0; 0 Challenger. 12 Futures
- Highest ranking: No. 201 (21 March 2022)

Hunter Johnson (born 2 June 1994) is a professional American tennis player and pickleball player.

Johnson has a career high ATP singles ranking of World No. 1,470 achieved on 24 October 2016 and a career high doubles ranking of World No. 201 achieved on 21 March 2022.

Johnson made his ATP main draw debut at the 2021 Delray Beach Open on hard course in Florida, where he was granted entry into the main doubles draw partnering with his twin brother Yates Johnson. They were defeated in the first round by another American duo, Christian Harrison and Ryan Harrison, in straight sets 2–6, 2–6.

Johnson has reached 20 career doubles finals, with a record of 12 wins and 8 losses all coming at the ITF Futures level. He has yet to reach a final in singles at any level.

== ATP Challenger and ITF Futures finals ==
=== Doubles: 21 (13–8) ===
Legend ATP Challenger (1–0) ITF Futures (12–8)	Finals by surface Hard (6–5) Clay (7–3) Grass (0–0) Carpet (0–0)

Result	W–L	Date	Tournament	Tier	Surface	Partner	Opponents	Score
Win	1–0	Jul 2015	Belgium F4, De Haan	Futures	Clay	(United States) Yates Johnson	(Monaco) Romain Arneodo (Republic of Ireland) Sam Barry	6–4, 4–6, [10–3]
Loss	1–1	Jul 2016	Belgium F5, Middelkerke	Futures	Hard	(United States) Yates Johnson	(Belgium) Ruben Bemelmans (Belgium) Yannick Mertens	1–6, 1–6
Loss	1–2	Jul 2016	Belgium F6, Knokke	Futures	Clay	(United States) Yates Johnson	(Belgium) Joran Vliegen (Belgium) Sander Gillé	4–6, 4–6
Win	2–2	Oct 2016	USA F30, Fountain Valley	Futures	Hard	(United States) Yates Johnson	(Austria) Sebastian Bader (Germany) Sebastian Fanselow	6–4, 7–5
Win	3–2	Nov 2016	USA F35, Birmingham	Futures	Clay	(United States) Yates Johnson	(United States) Austin Smith (United States) Alex Lawson	6–2, 6–4
Loss	3–3	Oct 2017	Italy F32, Santa Margherita Di Pula	Futures	Clay	(United States) Yates Johnson	(Italy) Walter Trusendi (Italy) Andrea Vavassori	6–7^{(3–7)}, 3–6
Win	4–3	Oct 2017	USA F34, Harlingen	Futures	Hard	(United States) Yates Johnson	(United States) Harrison Adams (United States) Shane Vinsant	7–6^{(7–2)}, 6–3
Win	5–3	Nov 2017	USA F37, Pensacola	Futures	Clay	(United States) Yates Johnson	(United States) Harrison Adams (United States) Junior Alexander Ore	6–3, 6–3
Win	6–3	Mar 2018	Greece F4, Heraklion	Futures	Hard	(United States) Yates Johnson	(Argentina) F Emanuel Egea (Argentina) M Nicolas Martinez	6–3, 6–3
Win	7–3	May 2018	Mexico F3, Córdoba	Futures	Hard	(United States) Yates Johnson	(Australia) Edward Bourchier (Peru) Alexander Merino	6–3, 6–3
Loss	7–4	Jul 2018	USA F19, Wichita	Futures	Hard	(United States) Yates Johnson	(United States) Brandon Holt (France) Maxime Cressy	6–3, 2–6, [6–10]
Loss	7–5	Sep 2018	USA F25, Laguna Niguel	Futures	Hard	(United States) Yates Johnson	(United States) Nicolas Meister (United States) Martin Redlicki	4–6, 6–3, [6–10]
Win	8–5	Apr 2019	M25 Sunderland, United Kingdom	World Tennis Tour	Hard	(United States) Yates Johnson	(United Kingdom) Scott Duncan (Republic of Ireland) Peter Bothwell	6–4, 6–3
Win	9–5	Apr 2019	M25 Santa Margherita Di Pula, Italy	World Tennis Tour	Clay	(United States) Yates Johnson	(Romania) M-A Jecan (Romania) Victor Vlad Cornea	6–3, 6–7^{(2–7)}, [10–5]
Win	10–5	Jul 2019	M25 Lasne, Belgium	World Tennis Tour	Clay	(United States) Yates Johnson	(Peru) Sergio Galdós (Argentina) Facundo Mena	6–3, 7–6^{(7–5)}
Loss	10–6	Aug 2019	M25 Schlieren, Switzerland	World Tennis Tour	Clay	(United States) Yates Johnson	(Czech Republic) David Škoch (Czech Republic) Petr Nouza	5–7, 3–6
Loss	10–7	Oct 2019	M25 Norman, United States	World Tennis Tour	Hard	(United States) Yates Johnson	(United Kingdom) Lloyd Glasspool (United States) Sekou Bangoura	6–7^{(9–11)}, 2–6
Win	11–7	Oct 2019	M25 Fort Worth, United States	World Tennis Tour	Hard	(United States) Yates Johnson	(United States) Charlie Emhardt (United States) Alfredo Perez	6–2, 6–4
Win	12–7	Feb 2021	M25 Naples, United States	World Tennis Tour	Clay	(United States) Yates Johnson	(Colombia) Alejandro Gomez (United States) Junior Alexander Ore	6–1, 1–6, [12–10]
Loss	12–8	Apr 2021	M25 Reus, Spain	World Tennis Tour	Clay	(United States) Yates Johnson	(France) Arthur Fils (France) Giovanni Mpetshi Perricard	4–6, 5–7
Win	13–8	Sep 2021	Bucharest, Romania	Challenger	Clay	(Philippines) Ruben Gonzales	(Germany) Maximilian Marterer (Czech Republic) Lukáš Rosol	1–6, 6–2, [10–3]

== See also ==
- List of professional pickleball players
