= Jiří Lehečka career statistics =

Career finals
Discipline	Type	Won	Lost	Total
Singles	Grand Slam	–	–	0
Singles	ATP Finals	–	–	0
Singles	ATP 1000	0	1	1
Singles	ATP 500	0	3	3
Singles	ATP 250	2	3	5
Singles	Olympics	–	–	0
Singles	Total	2	7	9
Doubles	Grand Slam	–	–	0
Doubles	ATP Finals	–	–	0
Doubles	ATP 1000	–	–	0
Doubles	ATP 500	0	1	1
Doubles	ATP 250	0	1	1
Doubles	Olympics	–	–	0
Doubles	Total	0	2	2

This is a list of the main career statistics of professional Czech tennis player Jiří Lehečka.

Lehečka at the 2026 Swiss Indoors

== Performance timelines ==
Key
W	F	SF	QF	#R	RR	Q#	DNQ	A	NH

(W) winner; (F) finalist; (SF) semifinalist; (QF) quarterfinalist; (#R) rounds 4, 3, 2, 1; (RR) round-robin stage; (Q#) qualification round; (DNQ) did not qualify; (A) absent; (NH) not held; (SR) strike rate (events won / competed); (W–L) win–loss record.
To avoid confusion and double counting, these charts are updated at the conclusion of a tournament or when the player's participation has ended.

=== Singles ===
Current through the 2026 Paris Masters.

Tournament	2019	2020	2021	2022	2023	2024	2025	2026	SR	W–L	Win %
Grand Slam tournaments
Australian Open	A	A	A	1R	QF	2R	4R	1R	0 / 5	8–5	62%
French Open	A	A	A	1R	2R	A	3R	1R	0 / 4	3–4	43%
Wimbledon	A	NH	A	1R	4R	A	2R	4R	0 / 4	7–4	64%
US Open	A	A	Q3	1R	1R	3R	QF	3R	0 / 5	8–5	60%
Win–Loss	0–0	0–0	0–0	0–4	8–4	3–2	10–4	5–4	0 / 18	26–18	59%
National representation
Davis Cup	Z1	RR		G1	QF	RR	QF		0 / 5	14–7	67%
ATP 1000 tournaments
Indian Wells Open	A	NH	A	A	2R	QF	2R	2R	0 / 4	4–4	50%
Miami Open	A	NH	A	A	3R	2R	2R	F	0 / 4	7–4	64%
Monte-Carlo Masters	A	NH	A	1R	3R	A	2R	3R	0 / 4	5–4	56%
Madrid Open	A	NH	A	A	2R	SF	2R	QF	0 / 4	7–4	64%
Italian Open	A	A	A	A	2R	A	1R	3R	0 / 3	1–3	25%
Canadian Open	A	NH	A	A	2R	A	4R	4R	0 / 3	5–3	63%
Cincinnati Open	A	A	A	A	1R	3R	4R	3R	0 / 4	5–4	56%
Shanghai Masters	A	NH			1R	3R	4R	3R	0 / 4	4–4	50%
Paris Masters	A	A	A	Q2	1R	1R	1R	1R	0 / 4	0–4	0%
Win–Loss	0–0	0–0	0–0	0–1	6–9	10–6	7–9	15–9	0 / 34	38–34	53%
Career statistics
Tournaments	0 (Note: During the season, he did not play in the main-draw of any ATP Tour-level tournaments. However, he played at the Davis Cup, which is not counted as a played tournament but as matches counted.)	0	0	16	24	16	23	18	Career total: 97		
Titles	0	0	0	0	0	1	1	0	Career total: 2		
Finals	0	0	0	0	1	2	3	2	Career total: 8		
Overall Win–Loss	0–1	0–0	0–1	13–19	34–26	30–19	41–23	34–18	2 / 97	152–107	59%
Year-end ranking	623	351	141	81	31	28	18		$11,012,255		

== ATP Masters 1000 finals ==
=== Singles: 1 (runner-up) ===
Result	Year	Tournament	Surface	Opponent	Score
Loss	2026	Miami Open	Hard	(Italy) Jannik Sinner	4–6, 4–6

== ATP Tour finals ==
=== Singles: 9 (2 titles, 7 runner-ups) ===
Legend ATP 1000 (0–1) ATP 500 (0–3) ATP 250 (2–3)	Finals by surface Hard (2–6) Grass (0–1)	Finals by setting Outdoor (2–4) Indoor (0–3)

Result	W–L	Date	Tournament	Tier	Surface	Opponent	Score
Loss	0–1	Aug 2023	Winston-Salem Open, US	ATP 250	Hard	(Argentina) Sebastián Báez	4–6, 3–6
Win	1–1	Jan 2024	Adelaide International, Australia	ATP 250	Hard	(United Kingdom) Jack Draper	4–6, 6–4, 6–3
Loss	1–2	Oct 2024	European Open, Belgium	ATP 250	Hard (i)	(Spain) Roberto Bautista Agut	5–7, 1–6
Win	2–2	Jan 2025	Brisbane International, Australia	ATP 250	Hard	(United States) Reilly Opelka	4–1, ret.
Loss	2–3	Jun 2025	Queen's Club Championships, UK	ATP 500	Grass	(Spain) Carlos Alcaraz	5–7, 7–6^{(7–5)}, 2–6
Loss	2–4	Oct 2025	European Open, Belgium	ATP 250	Hard (i)	(Canada) Félix Auger-Aliassime	6–7^{(2–7)}, 7–6^{(8–6)}, 2–6
Loss	2–5	Mar 2026	Miami Open, US	ATP 1000	Hard	(Italy) Jannik Sinner	4–6, 4–6
Loss	2–6	Oct 2026	Japan Open, Japan	ATP 500	Hard	(Spain) Carlos Alcaraz	6–7^{(4–7)}, 4–6
Loss	2–7	Oct 2026	Swiss Indoors, Switzerland	ATP 500	Hard (i)	(Monaco) Valentin Vacherot	6–2, 3–6, 3–6

=== Doubles: 2 (2 runner-ups) ===
Legend ATP 500 (0–1) ATP 250 (0–1)	Finals by surface Hard (0–1) Grass (0–1)	Finals by setting Outdoor (0–2)

Result	W–L	Date	Tournament	Tier	Surface	Partner	Opponents	Score
Loss	0–1	Jun 2023	Queen's Club Championships, UK	ATP 500	Grass	(United States) Taylor Fritz	(Croatia) Ivan Dodig (United States) Austin Krajicek	4–6, 7–6^{(7–5)}, [3–10]
Loss	0–2	Jan 2025	Brisbane International, Australia	ATP 250	Hard	(Czech Republic) Jakub Menšík	(United Kingdom) Julian Cash (United Kingdom) Lloyd Glasspool	3–6, 7–6^{(7–2)}, [6–10]

== ATP Next Generation finals ==
=== Singles: 1 (runner-up) ===
Result	Date	Tournament	Surface	Opponent	Score
Loss	Nov 2022	Next Generation ATP Finals, Italy	Hard (i)	(United States) Brandon Nakashima	3–4^{(5–7)}, 3–4^{(6–8)}, 2–4

== ATP Challenger Tour finals ==
=== Singles: 6 (3 titles, 3 runner-ups) ===
Legend ATP Challenger (3–3)	Finals by surface Hard (0–1) Clay (3–2)

Result	W–L	Date	Tournament	Surface	Opponent	Score
Win	1–0	Jul 2021	Tampere Open, Finland	Clay	(Argentina) Nicolás Kicker	5–7, 6–4, 6–3
Loss	1–1	Jul 2021	Poznań Open, Poland	Clay	(Spain) Bernabé Zapata Miralles	3–6, 2–6
Win	2–1	Sep 2021	Bucharest Challenger, Romania	Clay	(Slovakia) Filip Horanský	6–3, 6–2
Loss	2–2	Nov 2021	Open Pau–Pyrénées, France	Hard (i)	(Moldova) Radu Albot	2–6, 6–7^{(5–7)}
Loss	2–3	May 2022	Upper Austria Open, Austria	Clay	(Austria) Jurij Rodionov	4–6, 4–6
Win	3–3	Aug 2022	Svijany Open, Czech Republic	Clay	(Spain) Nicolás Álvarez Varona	6–4, 6–4

=== Doubles: 4 (3 titles, 1 runner-up) ===
Legend ATP Challenger (3–1)	Finals by surface Hard (1–0) Clay (2–1)

Result	W–L	Date	Tournament	Surface	Partner	Opponents	Score
Loss	0–1	Jun 2019	Czech Open, Czech Republic	Clay	(Czech Republic) Jiří Veselý	(Austria) Philipp Oswald (Slovakia) Filip Polášek	4–6, 6–7^{(4–7)}
Win	1–1	Jun 2021	Aspria Tennis Cup, Italy	Clay	(Czech Republic) Vít Kopřiva	(Germany) Dustin Brown (Austria) Tristan-Samuel Weissborn	6–4, 6–0
Win	2–1	Jul 2021	Poznań Open, Poland	Clay	(Czech Republic) Zdeněk Kolář	(Poland) Karol Drzewiecki (Australia) Aleksandar Vukic	6–4, 3–6, [10–5]
Win	3–1	Nov 2021	Trofeo Faip–Perrel, Italy	Hard (i)	(Czech Republic) Zdeněk Kolář	(United Kingdom) Lloyd Glasspool (Finland) Harri Heliövaara	6–4, 6–4

== ITF Tour finals ==
=== Singles: 7 (3 titles, 4 runner-ups) ===
Legend M25 tournaments (2–2) 15K / M15 tournaments (1–2)	Finals by surface Hard (1–3) Clay (2–1)

Result	W–L	Date	Tournament	Surface	Opponent	Score
Loss	0–1	Nov 2018	Czech Republic F11, Říčany	Hard	(Czech Republic) Tomáš Macháč	walkover
Loss	0–2	May 2019	M25+H Jablonec nad Nisou, Czech Republic	Clay	(Czech Republic) Patrik Rikl	6–7^{(3–7)}, 3–6
Win	1–2	Sep 2020	M25 Prague, Czech Republic	Clay	(Argentina) Sebastián Báez	3–6, 6–3, 6–4
Loss	1–3	Nov 2020	M15 Heraklion, Greece	Hard	(Bulgaria) Adrian Andreev	3–6, 4–6
Win	2–3	Feb 2021	M15 Sharm El Sheikh, Egypt	Hard	(Poland) Paweł Ciaś	6–1, 6–3
Loss	2–4	Apr 2021	M25 Biel, Switzerland	Hard	(Netherlands) Tim van Rijthoven	2–6, 2–6
Win	3–4	May 2021	M25 Jablonec nad Nisou, Czech Republic	Clay	(Ukraine) Vitaliy Sachko	6–2, 6–2

=== Doubles: 2 (1 title, 1 runner-up) ===
Legend M25 tournaments (1–0) 15K tournaments (0–1)

Result	W–L	Date	Tournament	Surface	Partner	Opponents	Score
Loss	0–1	Nov 2018	Czech Republic F11, Říčany	Hard	(Czech Republic) Jiří Barnat	(Czech Republic) Jiří Jeníček (Czech Republic) Vojtěch Vlkovský	4–6, 5–7
Win	1–1	Apr 2021	M25 Meerbusch, Germany	Clay	(Czech Republic) Michael Vrbenský	(Norway) Viktor Durasovic (Sweden) Markus Eriksson	6–3, 6–3

== Junior Grand Slam finals ==
=== Doubles: 1 (title) ===
Result	Year	Tournament	Surface	Partner	Opponents	Score
Win	2019	Wimbledon	Grass	(Czech Republic) Jonáš Forejtek	(Canada) Liam Draxl (United States) Govind Nanda	7–5, 6–4

== Wins against top 10 players ==
- Lehečka has a 12–27 record against players who were, at the time the match was played, ranked in the top 10.

No.	Player	Rk	Event	Surface	Rd	Score	Rk	Years	Ref
1	(Canada) Félix Auger-Aliassime	7	Australian Open, Australia	Hard	4R	4–6, 6–3, 7–6^{(7–2)}, 7–6^{(7–3)}	71	2023	
2	Andrey Rublev	5	Qatar Open, Qatar	Hard	QF	4–6, 6–4, 6–3	52	2023	
3	Andrey Rublev	5	Indian Wells Open, United States	Hard	3R	6–4, 6–4	31	2024	
4	Daniil Medvedev	4	Madrid Open, Spain	Clay	QF	6–4, 0–0 ret.	31	2024	
5	Daniil Medvedev	5	Cincinnati Open, United States	Hard	2R	7–6^{(7–2)}, 6–4	35	2024	
6	(Bulgaria) Grigor Dimitrov	10	Brisbane International, Australia	Hard	SF	6–4, 4–4 ret.	28	2025	
7	(Spain) Carlos Alcaraz	3	Qatar Open, Qatar	Hard	QF	6–3, 3–6, 6–4	25	2025	
8	(United Kingdom) Jack Draper	6	Queen's Club, United Kingdom	Grass	SF	6–4, 4–6, 7–5	30	2025	
9	(United States) Taylor Fritz	5	Davis Cup, United States	Hard	Q2	6–4, 3–6, 6–4	16	2025	
10	(United States) Taylor Fritz	7	Miami Open, United States	Hard	4R	6–4, 6–7^{(4–7)}, 6–2	22	2026	
11	(Italy) Lorenzo Musetti	9	Madrid Open, Spain	Clay	4R	6–3, 6–3	14	2026	
12	(United States) Ben Shelton	4	Davis Cup, Czech Republic	Hard	Q2	6–4, 6–4	24	2026	

- Key: (Rk) first use, opponent rank; (Rd) round; (Rk) 2nd use, player rank; (Ref) reference; (F) final; (SF) semifinal; (QF) quarterfinal; (#R) rounds 4, 3, 2, 1; (RR) round-robin stage; (Q#) qualifying rounds or stages (3), 2, 1.

== National representation ==
=== Davis Cup: 2 (2 defeats) ===
Lehečka represents the Czech Republic at the Davis Cup, where he has a W/L record of 0–2. He made his debut at the 2019 Davis Cup qualifying round against Robin Haase of the Netherlands.

Group membership World Group (0–0) Qualifying Round (0–1) WG Play-off (–) Group I (0–1) Group II (–) Group III (–) Group IV (–)	Matches by surface Hard (0–2) Clay (–) Grass (–) Carpet (–)	Matches by type Singles (0–1) Doubles (0–1)

- ▲ ▼ indicates the outcome of the Davis Cup match followed by the score, date, place of event, the zonal classification and its phase, and the court surface.

Rubber outcome	No.	Rubber	Match type (partner if any)	Opponent nation	Opponent player(s)	Score
▼1–3; 1-2 February 2019; Ostravar Aréna, Ostrava, Czech Republic; Davis Cup qualifying round; hard (i) surface
Loss	1	IV	Singles	Netherlands	Robin Haase	4–6, 6–2, 3–6
▲3–2; 14–15 September 2019; Arena Zenica, Zenica, Bosnia and Herzegovina; Europe/Africa Zone Group I first round; hard (i) surface
Loss	2	III	Doubles (with Jiří Veselý)	Bosnia and Herzegovina	Mirza Bašić / Tomislav Brkić	6–7^{(2–7)}, 3–6
