= 2020 I.ČLTK Prague Open – Singles =

Singles
- 2020 I.ČLTK Prague Open

Final
- Champion: (Switzerland) Stan Wawrinka
- Runner-up: (Russia) Aslan Karatsev
- Score: 7–6^{(7–2)}, 6–4

Events
| Singles | Doubles |
- I.ČLTK Prague Open

Mario Vilella Martínez was the defending champion but chose not to compete this year.

Stan Wawrinka won the title after defeating Aslan Karatsev 7–6^{(7–2)}, 6–4 in the final.

== Seeds ==
All seeds receive a bye into the second round.

1. (Switzerland) Stan Wawrinka (champion)
2. (Czech Republic) Jiří Veselý (second round)
3. (France) Pierre-Hugues Herbert (semifinals)
4. (Germany) Philipp Kohlschreiber (third round, withdrew)
5. (Slovakia) Jozef Kovalík (third round)
6. (India) Sumit Nagal (quarterfinals)
7. (Switzerland) Henri Laaksonen (quarterfinals)
8. (Belarus) Ilya Ivashka (second round)
9. (Slovenia) Blaž Rola (second round)
10. (Germany) Yannick Maden (third round)
11. (Belgium) Kimmer Coppejans (second round)
12. (Slovakia) Martin Kližan (second round)
13. (France) Arthur Rinderknech (second round)
14. (Latvia) Ernests Gulbis (third round)
15. (Austria) Sebastian Ofner (second round)
16. (Canada) Steven Diez (second round)

== Draw ==
Key

- Q = Qualifier
- WC = Wild card
- LL = Lucky loser
- Alt = Alternate
- ITF = ITF entry
- PR = Protected ranking
- SR = Special ranking
- SE = Special exempt
- JE = Junior exempt
- JR = Junior Accelerator Programme entrant
- CO = College Accelerator Programme entrant
- NG = Next Gen Accelerator Program entrant
- w/o = Walkover
- r = Retired
- d = Defaulted

=== Finals ===
Quarterfinals
1/WC | (Switzerland) Stan Wawrinka | 2 | 6 | 6
6 | (India) Sumit Nagal | 6 | 0 | 1
WC | (Czech Republic) Michael Vrbenský | 6 | 3 | 6
(Sweden) Elias Ymer | 2 | 6 | 4
(Netherlands) Tallon Griekspoor | 5 | 7 | 3
3 | (France) Pierre-Hugues Herbert | 7 | 5 | 6
7 | (Switzerland) Henri Laaksonen | 6^{3} | 4
(Russia) Aslan Karatsev | 7^{7} | 6

Semifinals
1/WC | (Switzerland) Stan Wawrinka | 5 | 6 | 6
WC | (Czech Republic) Michael Vrbenský | 7 | 3 | 3
3 | (France) Pierre-Hugues Herbert | 5 | 6^{7}
(Russia) Aslan Karatsev | 7 | 7^{9}

Final
1/WC | (Switzerland) Stan Wawrinka | 7^{7} | 6
(Russia) Aslan Karatsev | 6^{2} | 4

=== Top half ===
==== Section 1 ====
First round
(Russia) R Safiullin | 7 | 6
(Czech Republic) L Rosol | 5 | 2
(Tunisia) M Jaziri | 4 | 0
(Germany) O Otte | 6 | 6
(Spain) N Kuhn | 3 | 3
WC | (Czech Republic) J Lehečka | 6 | 6
(Kazakhstan) D Popko | 6^{3} | 6 | 3
(United Kingdom) J Clarke | 7^{7} | 3 | 6

Second round
1/WC | (Switzerland) S Wawrinka | 6 | 4 | 6
(Russia) R Safiullin | 1 | 6 | 1
(Germany) O Otte | 6 | 6
13 | (France) A Rinderknech | 2 | 3
9 | (Slovenia) B Rola | 4 | 6^{4}
WC | (Czech Republic) J Lehečka | 6 | 7^{7}
(United Kingdom) J Clarke | 3 | 7 | 1^{r}
6 | (India) S Nagal | 6 | 5 | 4

Third round
1/WC | (Switzerland) S Wawrinka | 3 | 7 | 6
(Germany) O Otte | 6 | 5 | 1
WC | (Czech Republic) J Lehečka | 7 | 6^{4} | 3
6 | (India) S Nagal | 5 | 7^{7} | 6

Quarterfinals
1/WC | (Switzerland) S Wawrinka | 2 | 6 | 6
6 | (India) S Nagal | 6 | 0 | 1

==== Section 2 ====
First round
(Russia) A Vatutin | 7 | 3 | 2
(Germany) M Moraing | 5 | 6 | 6
WC | (Czech Republic) M Vrbenský | 7 | 7
(Germany) D Masur | 5 | 5
(Sweden) E Ymer | 6 | 6
(Russia) E Karlovskiy | 3 | 4
(Ukraine) S Stakhovsky | 5 | 2
(Czech Republic) T Macháč | 7 | 6

Second round
4 | (Germany) P Kohlschreiber | 6 | 7^{7}
(Germany) M Moraing | 1 | 6^{3}
WC | (Czech Republic) M Vrbenský | 7 | 6
16 | (Canada) S Diez | 5 | 3
12 | (Slovakia) M Kližan | 2 | 6 | 2
(Sweden) E Ymer | 6 | 2 | 6
(Czech Republic) T Macháč | 6 | 7
8 | (Belarus) I Ivashka | 0 | 5

Third round
4 | (Germany) P Kohlschreiber
WC | (Czech Republic) M Vrbenský | w/o
(Sweden) E Ymer | 4 | 6 | 6
(Czech Republic) T Macháč | 6 | 3 | 0

Quarterfinals
WC | (Czech Republic) M Vrbenský | 6 | 3 | 6
(Sweden) E Ymer | 2 | 6 | 4

=== Bottom half ===
==== Section 3 ====
First round
(Spain) A Menéndez Maceiras | 7^{7} | 6
(Germany) R Molleker | 6^{4} | 3
PR | (Russia) A Kuznetsov | 6^{4} | 6^{5}
(Netherlands) T Griekspoor | 7^{7} | 7^{7}
(Czech Republic) Z Kolář | 6 | 6
Q | (Czech Republic) P Nouza | 2 | 1
(Netherlands) B van de Zandschulp | 4 | 6 | 4
WC | (Czech Republic) J Forejtek | 6 | 2 | 6

Second round
5 | (Slovakia) J Kovalík | 4 | 6 | 6
(Spain) A Menéndez Maceiras | 6 | 1 | 2
(Netherlands) T Griekspoor | 5 | 6 | 6
11 | (Belgium) K Coppejans | 7 | 4 | 3
15 | (Austria) S Ofner | 6^{7} | 5
(Czech Republic) Z Kolář | 7^{9} | 7
WC | (Czech Republic) J Forejtek | 6 | 4 | 3
3 | (France) P-H Herbert | 2 | 6 | 6

Third round
5 | (Slovakia) J Kovalík | 1 | 6 | 1
(Netherlands) T Griekspoor | 6 | 1 | 6
(Czech Republic) Z Kolář | 6^{3} | 6 | 3
3 | (France) P-H Herbert | 7^{7} | 2 | 6

Quarterfinals
(Netherlands) T Griekspoor | 5 | 7 | 3
3 | (France) P-H Herbert | 7 | 5 | 6

==== Section 4 ====
First round
Q | (Czech Republic) J Šátral | 7 | 7
(Belgium) R Bemelmans | 5 | 5
PR | (Belgium) A De Greef | 6 | 6
(France) E Couacaud | 2 | 0
WC | (Czech Republic) A Paulson | 6 | 2 | 6
(Slovakia) F Horanský | 3 | 6 | 3
(Netherlands) R Haase | 4 | 2
(Russia) A Karatsev | 6 | 6

Second round
7 | (Switzerland) H Laaksonen | 6 | 3 | 7
Q | (Czech Republic) J Šátral | 3 | 6 | 5
PR | (Belgium) A De Greef | 3 | 4
10 | (Germany) Y Maden | 6 | 6
14 | (Latvia) E Gulbis | 7 | 5 | 6
WC | (Czech Republic) A Paulson | 5 | 7 | 4
(Russia) A Karatsev | 6 | 6
2 | (Czech Republic) J Veselý | 3 | 4

Third round
7 | (Switzerland) H Laaksonen | 3 | 6 | 6
10 | (Germany) Y Maden | 6 | 4 | 3
14 | (Latvia) E Gulbis | 3 | 3
(Russia) A Karatsev | 6 | 6

Quarterfinals
7 | (Switzerland) H Laaksonen | 6^{3} | 4
(Russia) A Karatsev | 7^{7} | 6
