= 2021 Poznań Open – Doubles =

2021 ATP Challenger Tour

Doubles
- 2021 Poznań Open

Final
- Champions: (Czech Republic) Zdeněk Kolář (Czech Republic) Jiří Lehečka
- Runners-up: (Poland) Karol Drzewiecki (Australia) Aleksandar Vukic
- Score: 6–4, 3–6, [10–5]

Events
Singles	Doubles
← 2019 ·	Poznań Open	· 2022 →

Andrea Vavassori and David Vega Hernández were the defending champions but only Vega Hernández chose to defend his title, partnering Fernando Romboli. Vega Hernández lost in the semifinals to Zdeněk Kolář and Jiří Lehečka.

Kolář and Lehečka won the title after defeating Karol Drzewiecki and Aleksandar Vukic 6–4, 3–6, [10–5] in the final.

== Seeds ==
1. (Brazil) Fernando Romboli / (Spain) David Vega Hernández (semifinals)
2. (Poland) Szymon Walków / (Poland) Jan Zieliński (quarterfinals)
3. (United States) Evan King / (United States) Max Schnur (first round)
4. (Argentina) Guido Andreozzi / (Peru) Sergio Galdós (first round)

== Draw ==
=== Key ===
- Q = Qualifier
- WC = Wild card
- LL = Lucky loser
- Alt = Alternate
- ITF = ITF entry
- PR = Protected ranking
- SR = Special ranking
- SE = Special exempt
- JE = Junior exempt
- JR = Junior Accelerator Programme entrant
- CO = College Accelerator Programme entrant
- NG = Next Gen Accelerator Program entrant
- w/o = Walkover
- r = Retired
- d = Defaulted

First round
1	(Brazil) F Romboli (Spain) D Vega Hernández	6	6
(Kazakhstan) D Popko (Russia) A Vatutin	2	0
WC	(Romania) VV Cornea (Greece) Pe Tsitsipas	6	6
WC	(Sweden) L Borg (Poland) Aleksander Orlikowski	2	4
3	(United States) E King (United States) M Schnur	6^{5}	5
(Czech Republic) Z Kolář (Czech Republic) J Lehečka	7^{7}	7
(Argentina) P Cachin (Spain) B Zapata Miralles	6	6
(Argentina) F Mena (Peru) A Merino	1	1
(France) C Denolly (France) M Guinard	6^{2}	1
(France) E Couacaud (France) M Janvier	7^{7}	6
(Poland) K Drzewiecki (Australia) A Vukic	6	7^{9}
4	(Argentina) G Andreozzi (Peru) S Galdós	3	6^{7}
WC	(Poland) M Kaśnikowski (Poland) D Michalski	3	4
(Philippines) R Gonzales (United States) H Johnson	6	6
(Portugal) J Domingues (Portugal) G Elias	2	2
2	(Poland) S Walków (Poland) J Zieliński	6	6

Quarterfinals
1	(Brazil) F Romboli (Spain) D Vega Hernández	2	7^{7}	[10]
WC	(Romania) VV Cornea (Greece) Pe Tsitsipas	6	6^{0}	[3]
(Czech Republic) Z Kolář (Czech Republic) J Lehečka	w/o
(Argentina) P Cachin (Spain) B Zapata Miralles
(France) E Couacaud (France) M Janvier	6	3	[10]
(Poland) K Drzewiecki (Australia) A Vukic	3	6	[12]
(Philippines) R Gonzales (United States) H Johnson	2	7^{8}	[13]
2	(Poland) S Walków (Poland) J Zieliński	6	6^{6}	[11]

Semifinals
1	(Brazil) F Romboli (Spain) D Vega Hernández	7^{7}	4	[8]
(Czech Republic) Z Kolář (Czech Republic) J Lehečka	6^{4}	6	[10]
(Poland) K Drzewiecki (Australia) A Vukic	6	6
(Philippines) R Gonzales (United States) H Johnson	4	4

Final
(Czech Republic) Z Kolář (Czech Republic) J Lehečka	6	3	[10]
(Poland) K Drzewiecki (Australia) A Vukic	4	6	[5]
