= 2019 Amex-Istanbul Challenger – Singles =

Singles
- 2019 Amex-Istanbul Challenger

Final
- Champion: (France) Ugo Humbert
- Runner-up: (Uzbekistan) Denis Istomin
- Score: 6–2, 6–2

Events
Singles	Doubles
- Amex-Istanbul Challenger

Corentin Moutet was the defending champion but chose not to defend his title.

Ugo Humbert won the title after defeating Denis Istomin 6–2, 6–2 in the final.

== Seeds ==
All seeds receive a bye into the second round.

1. (France) Ugo Humbert (champion)
2. (Spain) Marcel Granollers (withdrew)
3. (Romania) Marius Copil (third round)
4. (Tunisia) Malek Jaziri (withdrew)
5. (Uzbekistan) Denis Istomin (final)
6. (Czech Republic) Lukáš Rosol (third round)
7. (France) Maxime Janvier (second round)
8. (India) Ramkumar Ramanathan (third round)
9. (Italy) Roberto Marcora (third round)
10. (Belgium) Ruben Bemelmans (quarterfinals)
11. (United Kingdom) Jay Clarke (second round)
12. (Spain) Nicola Kuhn (quarterfinals)
13. (Kazakhstan) Aleksandr Nedovyesov (quarterfinals)
14. (Russia) Roman Safiullin (second round)
15. (Colombia) Santiago Giraldo (withdrew)
16. (Slovenia) Blaž Kavčič (semifinals)
17. (Italy) Matteo Viola (third round)

== Draw ==
Key

- Q = Qualifier
- WC = Wild card
- LL = Lucky loser
- Alt = Alternate
- ITF = ITF entry
- PR = Protected ranking
- SR = Special ranking
- SE = Special exempt
- JE = Junior exempt
- JR = Junior Accelerator Programme entrant
- CO = College Accelerator Programme entrant
- NG = Next Gen Accelerator Program entrant
- w/o = Walkover
- r = Retired
- d = Defaulted

=== Finals ===
Quarterfinals
1	(France) Ugo Humbert	6^{3}	7	6
10	(Belgium) Ruben Bemelmans	7^{7}	5	2
16	(Slovenia) Blaž Kavčič	6	6
12	(Spain) Nicola Kuhn	3	0
(Netherlands) Botic van de Zandschulp	6	6
(Czech Republic) David Poljak	3	2
5	(Uzbekistan) Denis Istomin	6	6
13	(Kazakhstan) Aleksandr Nedovyesov	3	4

Semifinals
1	(France) Ugo Humbert	6	6
16	(Slovenia) Blaž Kavčič	2	1
(Netherlands) Botic van de Zandschulp	3	6	3
5	(Uzbekistan) Denis Istomin	6	3	6

Final
1	(France) Ugo Humbert	6	6
5	(Uzbekistan) Denis Istomin	2	2

=== Top half ===
==== Section 1 ====
First round
Alt	(Czech Republic) M Gengel	6	6
(Russia) S Danilov	2	0
(France) H Grenier	6	5	6
(Austria) J Rodionov	3	7	2
(Romania) A Jecan	6	6
(Russia) Shalva Dzhanashiya	2	0
(Kazakhstan) D Yevseyev	6^{4}	2
(France) G Blancaneaux	7^{7}	6

Second round
1	(France) U Humbert	6	6
Alt	(Czech Republic) M Gengel	1	2
(France) H Grenier	6	6
Alt	(Netherlands) S Arends	2	3
10	(Belgium) R Bemelmans	6	7
(Romania) A Jecan	2	5
(France) G Blancaneaux	2	6	4
6	(Czech Republic) L Rosol	6	3	6

Third round
1	(France) U Humbert	6	6
(France) H Grenier	2	4
10	(Belgium) R Bemelmans	6	6
6	(Czech Republic) L Rosol	4	3

Quarterfinals
1	(France) U Humbert	6^{3}	7	6
10	(Belgium) R Bemelmans	7^{7}	5	2

==== Section 2 ====
First round
(Bulgaria) A Lazov	5	6	1
(France) R Roumane	7	2	6
Alt	(Turkey) Burak Can Yılmaz	2	1
(Romania) FC Jianu	6	6
WC	(Russia) Kirill Saplin	0	1
Alt	(Romania) VV Cornea	6	6
WC	(Turkey) M İlhan	6	6
WC	(Turkey) MN Türker	4	3

Second round
3	(Romania) M Copil	6	0	6
(France) R Roumane	3	6	2
(Romania) FC Jianu	7^{10}	3	1^{r}
16	(Slovenia) B Kavčič	6^{8}	6	2
12	(Spain) N Kuhn	6	6
Alt	(Romania) VV Cornea	2	4
WC	(Turkey) M İlhan	2	2
8	(India) R Ramanathan	6	6

Third round
3	(Romania) M Copil	3	5
16	(Slovenia) B Kavčič	6	7
12	(Spain) N Kuhn	6	7
8	(India) R Ramanathan	3	5

Quarterfinals
16	(Slovenia) B Kavčič	6	6
12	(Spain) N Kuhn	3	0

=== Bottom half ===
==== Section 3 ====
First round
(Russia) A Dubrivnyy	3	2
(Netherlands) B van de Zandschulp	6	6
(Austria) L Miedler	6	6
(France) A Müller	4	4
(Kazakhstan) A Golubev	4	5
(Czech Republic) D Poljak	6	7
WC	(Denmark) H Rune	1	3
(France) T Lamasine	6	6

Second round
7	(France) M Janvier	6	4	2
(Netherlands) B van de Zandschulp	1	6	6
(Austria) L Miedler	6	7
11	(United Kingdom) J Clarke	3	5
14	(Russia) R Safiullin	4	6	2
(Czech Republic) D Poljak	6	3	6
(France) T Lamasine	4	1
17	(Italy) M Viola	6	6

Third round
(Netherlands) B van de Zandschulp	1	6	6
(Austria) L Miedler	6	1	3
(Czech Republic) D Poljak	6^{4}	6	6
17	(Italy) M Viola	7^{7}	4	4

Quarterfinals
(Netherlands) B van de Zandschulp	6	6
(Czech Republic) D Poljak	3	2

==== Section 4 ====
First round
(Austria) M Neuchrist	2^{r}
(Germany) M Zverev	5
(Russia) E Karlovskiy	3	6^{5}
(Bosnia and Herzegovina) A Šetkić	6	7^{7}
WC	(Turkey) Baran Cengiz	6	6
(Republic of Ireland) S Carr	3	2
(Belgium) Y Mertens	5	6	6^{3}
(United Kingdom) E Hoyt	7	4	7^{7}

Second round
5	(Uzbekistan) D Istomin	6^{9}	6	2
(Germany) M Zverev	7^{11}	2	1^{r}
(Bosnia and Herzegovina) A Šetkić	1	1
9	(Italy) R Marcora	6	6
13	(Kazakhstan) A Nedovyesov	6	6
WC	(Turkey) B Cengiz	1	4
(United Kingdom) E Hoyt	6	7
Alt	(Russia) M Elgin	4	5

Third round
5	(Uzbekistan) D Istomin	3	6	7^{11}
9	(Italy) R Marcora	6	3	6^{9}
13	(Kazakhstan) A Nedovyesov	6	3
(United Kingdom) E Hoyt	2	0^{r}

Quarterfinals
5	(Uzbekistan) D Istomin	6	6
13	(Kazakhstan) A Nedovyesov	3	4
