= 2022 Poznań Open – Singles =

Singles
- 2022 Poznań Open

Final
- Champion: (France) Arthur Rinderknech
- Runner-up: (Chile) Tomás Barrios Vera
- Score: 6–3, 7–6^{(7–2)}

Events
Singles	Doubles
← 2021 ·	Poznań Open	· 2023 →

Bernabé Zapata Miralles was the defending champion but chose not to defend his title.

Arthur Rinderknech won the title after defeating Tomás Barrios Vera 6–3, 7–6^{(7–2)} in the final.

== Seeds ==
1. (France) Arthur Rinderknech (champion)
2. (Switzerland) Henri Laaksonen (second round)
3. (Colombia) Daniel Elahi Galán (second round)
4. (Chinese Taipei) Tseng Chun-hsin (quarterfinals)
5. (Chile) Tomás Barrios Vera (final)
6. (France) Manuel Guinard (first round, retired)
7. (France) Hugo Grenier (second round)
8. (Argentina) Camilo Ugo Carabelli (second round, withdrew)

== Draw ==
=== Key ===
- Q = Qualifier
- WC = Wild card
- LL = Lucky loser
- Alt = Alternate
- ITF = ITF entry
- PR = Protected ranking
- SR = Special ranking
- SE = Special exempt
- JE = Junior exempt
- JR = Junior Accelerator Programme entrant
- CO = College Accelerator Programme entrant
- NG = Next Gen Accelerator Program entrant
- w/o = Walkover
- r = Retired
- d = Defaulted

=== Finals ===
Semifinals
1	(France) Arthur Rinderknech	6	7^{7}
(Bulgaria) Dimitar Kuzmanov	3	6^{3}
5	(Chile) Tomás Barrios Vera	6	6
Alt	(Argentina) Genaro Alberto Olivieri	4	1

Final
1	(France) Arthur Rinderknech	6	7^{7}
5	(Chile) Tomás Barrios Vera	3	6^{2}

=== Top half ===
First round
1	(France) A Rinderknech	6	6
(Italy) L Giustino	4	0
Q	(Poland) D Michalski	5	2
Q	(Ukraine) G Kravchenko	7	6
(Argentina) R Olivo	2	6^{6}
Q	(Brazil) D Dutra da Silva	6	7^{8}
Q	(Poland) M Kaśnikowski	7	4	1
8	(Argentina) C Ugo Carabelli	5	6	6
4	(Chinese Taipei) C-h Tseng	6	1
(Croatia) N Serdarušić	1	0^{r}
WC	(Sweden) L Borg	5	0
WC	(Bosnia and Herzegovina) A Šetkić	7	6
Q	(Ukraine) O Krutykh	2	5
(Bulgaria) D Kuzmanov	6	7
(Kazakhstan) D Popko	4	6	4
7	(France) H Grenier	6	2	6

Second round
1	(France) A Rinderknech	6^{6}	6	6
Q	(Ukraine) G Kravchenko	7^{8}	3	3
Q	(Brazil) D Dutra da Silva	w/o
8	(Argentina) C Ugo Carabelli
4	(Chinese Taipei) C-h Tseng	7	7^{9}
WC	(Bosnia and Herzegovina) A Šetkić	5	6^{7}
(Bulgaria) D Kuzmanov	6	6
7	(France) H Grenier	2	1

Quarterfinals
1	(France) A Rinderknech	7^{7}	7
Q	(Brazil) D Dutra da Silva	6^{1}	5
4	(Chinese Taipei) C-h Tseng	4	2
(Bulgaria) D Kuzmanov	6	6

Semifinals
1	(France) A Rinderknech	6	7^{7}
(Bulgaria) D Kuzmanov	3	6^{3}

=== Bottom half ===
First round
5	(Chile) T Barrios Vera	6	2	6
(Italy) A Arnaboldi	2	6	3
Q	(Germany) E Ejupovic	7^{8}	6
WC	(Poland) J Janowicz	6^{6}	1
(Argentina) F Mena	4	2
(Belgium) Z Bergs	6	6
(Bosnia and Herzegovina) M Bašić	7^{7}	3	1
3	(Colombia) DE Galán	6^{3}	6	6
6	(France) M Guinard	6	1^{r}
(France) G Barrère	4	2
Alt	(Argentina) GA Olivieri	7	7
Alt	(Chile) G Lama	5	5
PR	(Hungary) A Balázs	3	3
A Shevchenko	6	6
(Serbia) N Milojević	6	2	3
2	(Switzerland) H Laaksonen	1	6	6

Second round
5	(Chile) T Barrios Vera	6	7
Q	(Germany) E Ejupovic	2	5
(Belgium) Z Bergs	6	6
3	(Colombia) DE Galán	4	2
(France) G Barrère	6	4	6^{0}
Alt	(Argentina) GA Olivieri	4	6	7^{7}
A Shevchenko	6	6
2	(Switzerland) H Laaksonen	2	1

Quarterfinals
5	(Chile) T Barrios Vera	7	3	7^{8}
(Belgium) Z Bergs	5	6	6^{6}
Alt	(Argentina) GA Olivieri	6	3	6
A Shevchenko	4	6	2

Semifinals
5	(Chile) T Barrios Vera	6	6
Alt	(Argentina) GA Olivieri	4	1
