= 2026 Geneva Open – Singles =

Singles
- 2026 Geneva Open

Final
- Champion: (United States) Learner Tien
- Runner-up: (Argentina) Mariano Navone
- Score: 3–6, 6–3, 7–5

Details
- Draw: 28 (4 Q / 3 WC )
- Seeds: 8

Events
Singles	Doubles
- Geneva Open

Learner Tien defeated Mariano Navone in the final, 3–6, 6–3, 7–5 to win the singles title at the 2026 Geneva Open. It was his second ATP Tour title and his first on clay courts.

Novak Djokovic was the reigning champion, but did not participate this year.

== Seeds ==
The top four seeds received a bye into the second round.

1. (United States) Taylor Fritz (second round)
2. (Kazakhstan) Alexander Bublik (semifinals)
3. (United Kingdom) Cameron Norrie (second round)
4. (United States) Learner Tien (champion)
5. (France) Arthur Rinderknech (quarterfinals)
6. (Norway) Casper Ruud (semifinals)
7. (Chile) Alejandro Tabilo (withdrew)
8. (Spain) Jaume Munar (quarterfinals)

== Draw ==
Key

- Q = Qualifier
- WC = Wild card
- LL = Lucky loser
- Alt = Alternate
- ITF = ITF entry
- PR = Protected ranking
- SR = Special ranking
- SE = Special exempt
- JE = Junior exempt
- JR = Junior Accelerator Programme entrant
- CO = College Accelerator Programme entrant
- NG = Next Gen Accelerator Program entrant
- w/o = Walkover
- r = Retired
- d = Defaulted

=== Finals ===
Semifinals
6	(Norway) Casper Ruud	5	2
(Argentina) Mariano Navone	7	6
4	(United States) Learner Tien	6	4	7^{7}
2	(Kazakhstan) Alexander Bublik	1	6	6^{5}

Final
(Argentina) Mariano Navone	6	3	5
4	(United States) Learner Tien	3	6	7

=== Top half ===
First round
(Australia) A Popyrin	7^{7}	6^{5}	6
Q	(France) C Tabur	6^{2}	7^{7}	4
(France) A Mannarino	3	6^{5}
(Belgium) R Collignon	6	7^{7}
(United States) J Brooksby	3	5
6	(Norway) C Ruud	6	7
(Argentina) M Trungelliti	7	5	1
(Argentina) M Navone	5	7	6
(France) V Royer	6	3	4
Q	(Argentina) F Comesaña	2	6	6
Q	(United States) N Basavareddy	0	3
8	(Spain) J Munar	6	6

Second round
1	(United States) T Fritz	4	4
(Australia) A Popyrin	6	6
(Belgium) R Collignon	6^{2}	2
6	(Norway) C Ruud	7^{7}	6
3	(United Kingdom) C Norrie	4	4
(Argentina) M Navone	6	6
Q	(Argentina) F Comesaña	4	4
8	(Spain) J Munar	6	6

Quarterfinals
(Australia) A Popyrin	4	3
6	(Norway) C Ruud	6	6
(Argentina) M Navone	6	6
8	(Spain) J Munar	2	2

Semifinals
6	(Norway) C Ruud	5	2
(Argentina) M Navone	7	6

=== Bottom half ===
First round
LL	(Italy) R Brancaccio	2	6	6^{5}
WC	(Switzerland) S Wawrinka	6	4	7^{7}
(Argentina) S Báez	5	3
(United States) A Michelsen	7	6
WC	(Greece) S Tsitsipas	6	7^{10}
(France) G Mpetshi Perricard	4	6^{8}
5	(France) A Rinderknech	6	6
(Argentina) TA Tirante	4	1
WC	(Serbia) L Djere	6	3	6
LL	(Australia) J Duckworth	4	6	3
(Italy) L Sonego	3	1
Q	(Lithuania) E Butvilas	6	6

Second round
WC	(Switzerland) S Wawrinka	6^{1}	6^{4}
(United States) A Michelsen	7^{7}	7^{7}
WC	(Greece) S Tsitsipas	6^{4}	6^{2}
4	(United States) L Tien	7^{7}	7^{7}
5	(France) A Rinderknech	4	7^{7}	6
WC	(Serbia) L Djere	6	6^{4}	1
Q	(Lithuania) E Butvilas	4	3
2	(Kazakhstan) A Bublik	6	6

Quarterfinals
(United States) A Michelsen	4	6	1
4	(United States) L Tien	6	3	6
5	(France) A Rinderknech	7	4	2
2	(Kazakhstan) A Bublik	5	6	6

Semifinals
4	(United States) L Tien	6	4	7^{7}
2	(Kazakhstan) A Bublik	1	6	6^{5}

== Qualifying ==
=== Seeds ===
1. (Croatia) Dino Prižmić (withdrew)
2. (Australia) James Duckworth (qualifying competition, lucky loser)
3. (Austria) Sebastian Ofner (first round)
4. (United States) Zachary Svajda (first round)
5. (France) Alexandre Müller (first round)
6. (Argentina) Francisco Comesaña (qualified)
7. (United States) Nishesh Basavareddy (qualified)
8. (France) Clément Tabur (qualified)
9. (Italy) Raúl Brancaccio (qualifying competition, lucky loser)

=== Qualifiers ===
1. (France) Clément Tabur
2. (Lithuania) Edas Butvilas
3. (United States) Nishesh Basavareddy
4. (Argentina) Francisco Comesaña

=== Lucky losers ===
1. (Italy) Raúl Brancaccio
2. (Australia) James Duckworth

=== Qualifying draw ===
==== First qualifier ====
First round
9	(Italy) Raúl Brancaccio	6	3	6
(United States) Tyler Zink	4	6	3
Alt	(Switzerland) Marc-Andrea Hüsler	4	4
8/Alt	(France) Clément Tabur	6	6

Qualifying competition
9	(Italy) Raúl Brancaccio	6	2	2
8/Alt	(France) Clément Tabur	0	6	6

==== Second qualifier ====
First round
2	(Australia) James Duckworth	3	7	6
(Spain) Miguel Damas	6	5	3
(Lithuania) Edas Butvilas	6	6
5	(France) Alexandre Müller	4	1

Qualifying competition
2	(Australia) James Duckworth	5	6^{4}
(Lithuania) Edas Butvilas	7	7^{7}

==== Third qualifier ====
First round
3	(Austria) Sebastian Ofner	4	0
WC	(Switzerland) Kilian Feldbausch	6	6
(Colombia) Daniel Elahi Galán	6^{5}	2
7	(United States) Nishesh Basavareddy	7^{7}	6

Qualifying competition
WC	(Switzerland) Kilian Feldbausch	3	2
7	(United States) Nishesh Basavareddy	6	6

==== Fourth qualifier ====
First round
4	(United States) Zachary Svajda	2	2
PR	(Germany) Max Hans Rehberg	6	6
WC	(Switzerland) Henry Bernet	3	1
6	(Argentina) Francisco Comesaña	6	6

Qualifying competition
PR	(Germany) Max Hans Rehberg	3	2
6	(Argentina) Francisco Comesaña	6	6
