= 2020 Challenger Banque Nationale de Drummondville – Singles =

Singles
- 2020 Challenger Banque Nationale de Drummondville

Final
- Champion: (United States) Maxime Cressy
- Runner-up: (France) Arthur Rinderknech
- Score: 6–7^{(4–7)}, 6–4, 6–4

Events
Singles	Doubles
- Challenger de Drummondville

Ričardas Berankis was the defending champion but chose not to defend his title.

Maxime Cressy won the title after defeating Arthur Rinderknech 6–7^{(4–7)}, 6–4, 6–4 in the final.

== Seeds ==
All seeds receive a bye into the second round.

1. (Germany) Dominik Koepfer (third round)
2. (Japan) Go Soeda (second round)
3. (Australia) Christopher O'Connell (semifinals)
4. (Canada) Brayden Schnur (second round)
5. (Australia) Andrew Harris (third round)
6. (United States) Michael Mmoh (third round)
7. (Australia) Max Purcell (third round)
8. (Dominican Republic) Roberto Cid Subervi (quarterfinals)
9. (United Kingdom) Liam Broady (third round)
10. (Germany) Tobias Kamke (quarterfinals)
11. (United States) Sebastian Korda (quarterfinals)
12. (France) Arthur Rinderknech (final)
13. (South Korea) Nam Ji-sung (third round)
14. (United States) Maxime Cressy (champion)
15. (Japan) Yosuke Watanuki (quarterfinals)
16. (Portugal) Gonçalo Oliveira (second round)

== Draw ==
Key

- Q = Qualifier
- WC = Wild card
- LL = Lucky loser
- Alt = Alternate
- ITF = ITF entry
- PR = Protected ranking
- SR = Special ranking
- SE = Special exempt
- JE = Junior exempt
- JR = Junior Accelerator Programme entrant
- CO = College Accelerator Programme entrant
- NG = Next Gen Accelerator Program entrant
- w/o = Walkover
- r = Retired
- d = Defaulted

=== Finals ===
Quarterfinals
15	(Japan) Yosuke Watanuki	2	4
12	(France) Arthur Rinderknech	6	6
3	(Australia) Christopher O'Connell	6	6
11	(United States) Sebastian Korda	3	4
10	(Germany) Tobias Kamke	4	3
14	(United States) Maxime Cressy	6	6
8	(Dominican Republic) Roberto Cid Subervi	6	4	1
(Germany) Johannes Härteis	1	6	6

Semifinals
12	(France) Arthur Rinderknech	6	6
3	(Australia) Christopher O'Connell	4	2
14	(United States) Maxime Cressy	7^{7}	6
(Germany) Johannes Härteis	6^{2}	4

Final
12	(France) Arthur Rinderknech	7^{7}	4	4
14	(United States) Maxime Cressy	6^{4}	6	6

=== Top half ===
==== Section 1 ====
First round
(United States) S Kirchheimer	6	6
WC	(Canada) F Peliwo	3	4
WC	(Canada) Kamen Damov	0	1
(France) G Blancaneaux	6	6
(Venezuela) R Rodríguez	7^{7}	6^{5}	6
WC	(Canada) Ilya Tiraspolsky	6^{0}	7^{7}	0
(France) M Guinard	7^{12}	2	3
PR	(United States) R Sarmiento	6^{10}	6	2^{r}

Second round
1	(Germany) D Koepfer	7	4	6
(United States) S Kirchheimer	5	6	3
(France) G Blancaneaux	2	7	6^{4}
15	(Japan) Yo Watanuki	6	5	7^{7}
12	(France) A Rinderknech	6	7
(Venezuela) R Rodríguez	4	5
(France) M Guinard	2	6	4
6	(United States) M Mmoh	6	3	6

Third round
1	(Germany) D Koepfer	3	1
15	(Japan) Yo Watanuki	6	6
12	(France) A Rinderknech	6	3	6
6	(United States) M Mmoh	2	6	3

Quarterfinals
15	(Japan) Yo Watanuki	2	4
12	(France) A Rinderknech	6	6

==== Section 2 ====
First round
(Canada) A Galarneau	6	2	1
(France) A Escoffier	2	6	6
(United States) Evan Song	6	6
Alt	(Bolivia) B Arias	2	1
Q	(Canada) Razvan Baiant	2	2
(Germany) Tobias Simon	6	6
(United States) N Chappell	2	4
(United Kingdom) R Peniston	6	6

Second round
3	(Australia) C O'Connell	6	6
(France) A Escoffier	3	4
(United States) E Song	2	1
13	(South Korea) J-s Nam	6	6
11	(United States) S Korda	6	4	7^{8}
(Germany) T Simon	3	6	6^{6}
(United Kingdom) R Peniston	2	4
7	(Australia) M Purcell	6	6

Third round
3	(Australia) C O'Connell	6	4	6
13	(South Korea) J-s Nam	1	6	4
11	(United States) S Korda	6^{5}	6	6
7	(Australia) M Purcell	7^{7}	1	0

Quarterfinals
3	(Australia) C O'Connell	6	6
11	(United States) S Korda	3	4

=== Bottom half ===
==== Section 3 ====
First round
Q	(Canada) Washi Gervais	1	2
(Monaco) L Catarina	6	6
(Japan) Shintaro Imai	7^{7}	6
(United States) Mi Redlicki	6^{1}	3
WC	(Canada) David Volfson	3	7	4
WC	(Canada) T Baadi	6	5	6
(Italy) L Caruana	7	6
(Japan) Y Takahashi	5	3

Second round
5	(Australia) A Harris	3	6	6
(Monaco) L Catarina	6	4	1
(Japan) S Imai	3	6	3
10	(Germany) T Kamke	6	1	6
14	(United States) M Cressy	6	6
WC	(Canada) T Baadi	1	2
(Italy) L Caruana	7^{7}	6
4	(Canada) B Schnur	6^{1}	4

Third round
5	(Australia) A Harris	3	6^{2}
10	(Germany) T Kamke	6	7^{7}
14	(United States) M Cressy	6	6
(Italy) L Caruana	2	1

Quarterfinals
10	(Germany) T Kamke	4	3
14	(United States) M Cressy	6	6

==== Section 4 ====
First round
(Colombia) A Gómez	4	6	6
(United States) Felix Corwin	6	3	2
(United Kingdom) L Glasspool	6^{1}	6	0
(United States) V Kirkov	7^{7}	3	6
(Germany) J Härteis	6	6
LL	(France) Tony Bourcet	2	0
(Japan) K Uchida	1	7^{7}	5
(Finland) P Niklas-Salminen	6	6^{4}	7

Second round
8	(Dominican Republic) R Cid Subervi	6	6
(Colombia) A Gómez	0	2
(United States) V Kirkov	6	3	4
9	(United Kingdom) L Broady	3	6	6
16	(Portugal) G Oliveira	6^{5}	1
(Germany) J Härteis	7^{7}	6
(Finland) P Niklas-Salminen	7^{7}	6
2	(Japan) G Soeda	6^{5}	4

Third round
8	(Dominican Republic) R Cid Subervi	6	6
9	(United Kingdom) L Broady	4	1
(Germany) J Härteis	7^{7}	5	7
(Finland) P Niklas-Salminen	6^{5}	7	5

Quarterfinals
8	(Dominican Republic) R Cid Subervi	6	4	1
(Germany) J Härteis	1	6	6
