= 2020 I.ČLTK Prague Open – Doubles =

Doubles
- 2020 I.ČLTK Prague Open

Final
- Champions: (France) Pierre-Hugues Herbert (France) Arthur Rinderknech
- Runners-up: (Czech Republic) Zdeněk Kolář (Czech Republic) Lukáš Rosol
- Score: 6–3, 6–4

Events
Singles	Doubles
- I.ČLTK Prague Open

The men's doubles of the 2020 I.ČLTK Prague Open tournament was played on clay in Prague, Czech Republic.

Ariel Behar and Gonzalo Escobar were the defending champions but chose not compete this year.

Pierre-Hugues Herbert and Arthur Rinderknech won the title after defeating Zdeněk Kolář and Lukáš Rosol 6–3, 6–4 in the final.

== Seeds ==
1. (Netherlands) Robin Haase / (India) Divij Sharan (quarterfinals)
2. (Argentina) Andrés Molteni / (Monaco) Hugo Nys (first round)
3. (New Zealand) Artem Sitak / (Slovakia) Igor Zelenay (first round)
4. (Sweden) André Göransson / (Portugal) Gonçalo Oliveira (quarterfinals)

== Draw ==
Key

- Q = Qualifier
- WC = Wild card
- LL = Lucky loser
- Alt = Alternate
- ITF = ITF entry
- PR = Protected ranking
- SR = Special ranking
- SE = Special exempt
- JE = Junior exempt
- JR = Junior Accelerator Programme entrant
- CO = College Accelerator Programme entrant
- NG = Next Gen Accelerator Program entrant
- w/o = Walkover
- r = Retired
- d = Defaulted

First round
1	(Netherlands) R Haase (India) D Sharan	6	6
WC	(Czech Republic) J Forejtek (Czech Republic) M Vrbenský	3	2
(Netherlands) S Arends (Netherlands) D Pel	5	3
WC	(Czech Republic) J Lehečka (Czech Republic) T Macháč	7	6
4	(Sweden) A Göransson (Portugal) G Oliveira	6	6
(Monaco) R Arneodo (Austria) T-S Weissborn	3	4
(Mexico) H Hach Verdugo (Spain) D Vega Hernández	3	3
WC	(Czech Republic) Z Kolář (Czech Republic) L Rosol	6	6
(Belgium) R Bemelmans (Germany) D Masur	2	6^{3}
(France) P-H Herbert (France) A Rinderknech	6	7^{7}
(Belarus) I Ivashka (India) S Nagal	3	6	[10]
3	(New Zealand) A Sitak (Slovakia) I Zelenay	6	3	[8]
(Ukraine) S Stakhovsky (Czech Republic) J Veselý	3	4
(Canada) S Diez (Slovenia) B Rola	6	6
(India) S Balaji (Belgium) K Coppejans	7	4	[10]
2	(Argentina) A Molteni (Monaco) H Nys	5	6	[6]

Quarterfinals
1	(Netherlands) R Haase (India) D Sharan	3	6^{8}
WC	(Czech Republic) J Lehečka (Czech Republic) T Macháč	6	7^{10}
4	(Sweden) A Göransson (Portugal) G Oliveira	5	2
WC	(Czech Republic) Z Kolář (Czech Republic) L Rosol	7	6
(France) P-H Herbert (France) A Rinderknech	6	6
(Belarus) I Ivashka (India) S Nagal	2	4
(Canada) S Diez (Slovenia) B Rola	6	6
(India) S Balaji (Belgium) K Coppejans	4	3

Semifinals
WC	(Czech Republic) J Lehečka (Czech Republic) T Macháč
WC	(Czech Republic) Z Kolář (Czech Republic) L Rosol	w/o
(France) P-H Herbert (France) A Rinderknech	6	7
(Canada) S Diez (Slovenia) B Rola	4	5

Final
WC	(Czech Republic) Z Kolář (Czech Republic) L Rosol	3	4
(France) P-H Herbert (France) A Rinderknech	6	6
