= 2019 Amex-Istanbul Challenger – Doubles =

Doubles
- 2019 Amex-Istanbul Challenger

Final
- Champions: (Kazakhstan) Andrey Golubev (Kazakhstan) Aleksandr Nedovyesov
- Runners-up: (Czech Republic) Marek Gengel (Czech Republic) Lukáš Rosol
- Score: Walkover

Events
Singles	Doubles
- Amex-Istanbul Challenger

Rameez Junaid and Purav Raja were the defending champions but lost in the quarterfinals to Andrey Golubev and Aleksandr Nedovyesov.

Golubev and Nedovyesov won the title after Marek Gengel and Lukáš Rosol withdrew before the final.

== Seeds ==
1. (Netherlands) Sander Arends / (Netherlands) David Pel (first round)
2. (Australia) Rameez Junaid / (India) Purav Raja (quarterfinals)
3. (Austria) Lucas Miedler / (Austria) Tristan-Samuel Weissborn (quarterfinals)
4. (United Kingdom) Scott Clayton / (United Kingdom) Evan Hoyt (first round)

== Draw ==
Key

- Q = Qualifier
- WC = Wild card
- LL = Lucky loser
- Alt = Alternate
- ITF = ITF entry
- PR = Protected ranking
- SR = Special ranking
- SE = Special exempt
- JE = Junior exempt
- JR = Junior Accelerator Programme entrant
- CO = College Accelerator Programme entrant
- NG = Next Gen Accelerator Program entrant
- w/o = Walkover
- r = Retired
- d = Defaulted

First round
1	(Netherlands) S Arends (Netherlands) D Pel	7^{9}	5	[9]
(Czech Republic) M Gengel (Czech Republic) L Rosol	6^{7}	7	[11]
(Romania) M Copil (France) U Humbert	7^{8}	3	[9]
(Russia) M Elgin (Uzbekistan) D Istomin	6^{6}	6	[11]
4	(United Kingdom) S Clayton (United Kingdom) E Hoyt	4	2
Alt	(Russia) A Dubrivnyy (Kazakhstan) D Yevseyev	6	6
(France) G Blancaneaux (France) A Müller	7	6
(France) M Janvier (Belgium) Y Mertens	5	3
(France) H Grenier (India) R Ramanathan	6	6
WC	(Turkey) A Azkara (Turkey) Burak Bilgin	4	2
WC	(Bosnia and Herzegovina) A Šetkić (Turkey) MN Türker	1	1
3	(Austria) L Miedler (Austria) T-S Weissborn	6	6
(Kazakhstan) A Golubev (Kazakhstan) A Nedovyesov	6	7
(Romania) VV Cornea (Romania) A Jecan	2	5
WC	(Belgium) R Bemelmans (Serbia) N Zimonjić	4	4
2	(Australia) R Junaid (India) P Raja	6	6

Quarterfinals
(Czech Republic) M Gengel (Czech Republic) L Rosol	6	6
(Russia) M Elgin (Uzbekistan) D Istomin	4	2
Alt	(Russia) A Dubrivnyy (Kazakhstan) D Yevseyev	6	6^{1}	[10]
(France) G Blancaneaux (France) A Müller	4	7^{7}	[6]
(France) H Grenier (India) R Ramanathan	4	7^{7}	[12]
3	(Austria) L Miedler (Austria) T-S Weissborn	6	6^{5}	[10]
(Kazakhstan) A Golubev (Kazakhstan) A Nedovyesov	4	7^{7}	[10]
2	(Australia) R Junaid (India) P Raja	6	6^{2}	[3]

Semifinals
(Czech Republic) M Gengel (Czech Republic) L Rosol	7^{7}	3	[10]
Alt	(Russia) A Dubrivnyy (Kazakhstan) D Yevseyev	6^{1}	6	[3]
(France) H Grenier (India) R Ramanathan	4	2
(Kazakhstan) A Golubev (Kazakhstan) A Nedovyesov	6	6

Final
(Czech Republic) M Gengel (Czech Republic) L Rosol
(Kazakhstan) A Golubev (Kazakhstan) A Nedovyesov	w/o
