= 2018 Amex-Istanbul Challenger =

- Date: 10–16 September
- Edition: 31st
- Surface: Hard
- Location: Istanbul, Turkey

Champions

Singles
- (France) Corentin Moutet

Doubles
- (Australia) Rameez Junaid / (India) Purav Raja
← 2017 ·	Amex-Istanbul Challenger	· 2019 →

The 2018 Amex-Istanbul Challenger was a professional tennis tournament played on hard courts. It was the 31st edition of the tournament which was part of the 2018 ATP Challenger Tour. It took place in Istanbul, Turkey between 10 and 16 September 2018.

== Singles main-draw entrants ==
=== Seeds ===
Country	Player	Rank^{1}	Seed
ITA	Thomas Fabbiano	110	1
FRA	Corentin Moutet	112	2
ESP	Adrián Menéndez Maceiras	114	3
FRA	Quentin Halys	156	4
FRA	Constant Lestienne	171	5
GER	Oscar Otte	183	6
NED	Tallon Griekspoor	187	7
AUT	Lucas Miedler	219	8

- ^{1} Rankings are as of 27 August 2018.

=== Other entrants ===
The following players received wildcards into the singles main draw:

- (Turkey) Ergi Kırkın
- (Spain) Nicola Kuhn
- (Georgia (country)) Aleksandre Metreveli
- (Turkey) Anıl Yüksel

The following player received entry into the singles main draw as a special exempt:

- (France) Enzo Couacaud

The following player received entry into the singles main draw as an alternate:

- (France) Hugo Grenier

The following players received entry from the qualifying draw:

- (Turkey) Altuğ Çelikbilek
- (Egypt) Youssef Hossam
- (Netherlands) Tim van Rijthoven
- (France) Tak Khunn Wang

== Champions ==
=== Singles ===
- (France) Corentin Moutet def. (France) Quentin Halys 6–3, 6–4.

=== Doubles ===
- (Australia) Rameez Junaid / (India) Purav Raja def. (Kazakhstan) Timur Khabibulin / (Ukraine) Vladyslav Manafov 7–6^{(7–4)}, 4–6, [10–7].
