= 2018 Amex-Istanbul Challenger – Doubles =

Doubles
- 2018 Amex-Istanbul Challenger

Final
- Champions: (Australia) Rameez Junaid (India) Purav Raja
- Runners-up: (Kazakhstan) Timur Khabibulin (Ukraine) Vladyslav Manafov
- Score: 7–6^{(7–4)}, 4–6, [10–7]

Events
Singles	Doubles
- Amex-Istanbul Challenger

Andre Begemann and Jonathan Eysseric were the defending champions but chose not to defend their title.

Rameez Junaid and Purav Raja won the title after defeating Timur Khabibulin and Vladyslav Manafov 7–6^{(7–4)}, 4–6, [10–7] in the final.

== Seeds ==
1. (Australia) Rameez Junaid / (India) Purav Raja (champions)
2. (Kazakhstan) Timur Khabibulin / (Ukraine) Vladyslav Manafov (final)
3. (Russia) Mikhail Elgin / (Belarus) Yaraslav Shyla (semifinals)
4. (Spain) Gerard Granollers / (Spain) Adrián Menéndez Maceiras (first round)

== Draw ==
Key

- Q = Qualifier
- WC = Wild card
- LL = Lucky loser
- Alt = Alternate
- ITF = ITF entry
- PR = Protected ranking
- SR = Special ranking
- SE = Special exempt
- JE = Junior exempt
- JR = Junior Accelerator Programme entrant
- CO = College Accelerator Programme entrant
- NG = Next Gen Accelerator Program entrant
- w/o = Walkover
- r = Retired
- d = Defaulted

First round
1	(Australia) R Junaid (India) P Raja	6	6
PR	(Georgia (country)) A Metreveli (Austria) L Miedler	2	3
(Turkey) T Altuna (Italy) T Fabbiano	6	6
WC	(Turkey) U Akkoyun (Turkey) MN Türker	4	2
3	(Russia) M Elgin (Belarus) Y Shyla	6	6
(France) Q Halys (Kazakhstan) A Nedovyesov	4	3
WC	(Turkey) C İlkel (Turkey) A Yüksel	6	6
PR	(Turkey) A Çelikbilek (Netherlands) T van Rijthoven	4	3
(France) M Janvier (Portugal) G Oliveira	4	6	[10]
WC	(Turkey) S Ağabigün (Turkey) E Kırkın	6	3	[3]
(France) E Benchetrit (France) C Moutet	7^{7}	6
4	(Spain) G Granollers (Spain) A Menéndez Maceiras	6^{4}	2
(France) B Bonzi (France) A Hoang	6	6^{7}	[12]
(Spain) N Kuhn (Germany) D Masur	2	7^{9}	[10]
Alt	(Belarus) S Betov (Kazakhstan) D Yevseyev	6^{1}	6	[8]
2	(Kazakhstan) T Khabibulin (Ukraine) V Manafov	7^{7}	2	[10]

Quarterfinals
1	(Australia) R Junaid (India) P Raja	6	6
(Turkey) T Altuna (Italy) T Fabbiano	1	1
3	(Russia) M Elgin (Belarus) Y Shyla	6	6
WC	(Turkey) C İlkel (Turkey) A Yüksel	2	1
(France) M Janvier (Portugal) G Oliveira	5^{5}	7	[10]
(France) E Benchetrit (France) C Moutet	7^{7}	5	[12]
(France) B Bonzi (France) A Hoang	4	6	[3]
2	(Kazakhstan) T Khabibulin (Ukraine) V Manafov	6	4	[10]

Semifinals
1	(Australia) R Junaid (India) P Raja	6	4	[10]
3	(Russia) M Elgin (Belarus) Y Shyla	2	6	[7]
(France) E Benchetrit (France) C Moutet	1	6^{6}
2	(Kazakhstan) T Khabibulin (Ukraine) V Manafov	6	7^{8}

Final
1	(Australia) R Junaid (India) P Raja	7^{7}	4	[10]
2	(Kazakhstan) T Khabibulin (Ukraine) V Manafov	6^{4}	6	[7]
