= 2018 Amex-Istanbul Challenger – Singles =

Singles
- 2018 Amex-Istanbul Challenger

Final
- Champion: (France) Corentin Moutet
- Runner-up: (France) Quentin Halys
- Score: 6–3, 6–4

Events
Singles	Doubles
- Amex-Istanbul Challenger

Malek Jaziri was the defending champion but chose not to defend his title.

Corentin Moutet won the title after defeating Quentin Halys 6–3, 6–4 in the final.

== Seeds ==
1. (Italy) Thomas Fabbiano (semifinals)
2. (France) Corentin Moutet (champion)
3. (Spain) Adrián Menéndez Maceiras (first round)
4. (France) Quentin Halys (final)
5. (France) Constant Lestienne (second round)
6. (Germany) Oscar Otte (second round)
7. (Netherlands) Tallon Griekspoor (quarterfinals)
8. (Austria) Lucas Miedler (quarterfinals)

== Draw ==
Key

- Q = Qualifier
- WC = Wild card
- LL = Lucky loser
- Alt = Alternate
- ITF = ITF entry
- PR = Protected ranking
- SR = Special ranking
- SE = Special exempt
- JE = Junior exempt
- JR = Junior Accelerator Programme entrant
- CO = College Accelerator Programme entrant
- NG = Next Gen Accelerator Program entrant
- w/o = Walkover
- r = Retired
- d = Defaulted

=== Finals ===
Semifinals
1	(Italy) Thomas Fabbiano	3	6	4
4	(France) Quentin Halys	6	4	6
(France) Antoine Hoang	6	5	0
2	(France) Corentin Moutet	2	7	6

Final
4	(France) Quentin Halys	3	4
2	(France) Corentin Moutet	6	6

=== Top half ===
First round
1	(Italy) T Fabbiano	6	6
Alt	(France) H Grenier	3	2
(Czech Republic) V Šafránek	1	4
(France) B Bonzi	6	6
(Kazakhstan) D Yevseyev	6^{3}	4
(Italy) M Viola	7^{7}	6
(Germany) D Masur	6	3	6^{5}
5	(France) C Lestienne	0	6	7^{7}
4	(France) Q Halys	6	6
WC	(Spain) N Kuhn	3	4
(Kazakhstan) A Nedovyesov	6	6
WC	(Georgia (country)) A Metreveli	3	4
Q	(Egypt) Y Hossam	6	6
WC	(Turkey) A Yüksel	3	2
Q	(France) TK Wang	4	1
7	(Netherlands) T Griekspoor	6	6

Second round
1	(Italy) T Fabbiano	3	6	6
(France) B Bonzi	6	1	4
(Italy) M Viola	6	6
5	(France) C Lestienne	3	1
4	(France) Q Halys	7^{7}	6^{5}	6
(Kazakhstan) A Nedovyesov	6^{4}	7^{7}	4
Q	(Egypt) Y Hossam	3	2
7	(Netherlands) T Griekspoor	6	6

Quarterfinals
1	(Italy) T Fabbiano	3	6	6
(Italy) M Viola	6	2	4
4	(France) Q Halys	6	3	7^{7}
7	(Netherlands) T Griekspoor	4	6	6^{3}

Semifinals
1	(Italy) T Fabbiano	3	6	4
4	(France) Q Halys	6	4	6

=== Bottom half ===
First round
8	(Austria) L Miedler	7	3
SE	(France) E Couacaud	5	0^{r}
Q	(Netherlands) T van Rijthoven	6^{7}	2
(France) E Benchetrit	7^{9}	6
(France) M Janvier	6	3	4
(France) A Hoang	4	6	6
(Portugal) G Oliveira	6	2	6
3	(Spain) A Menéndez Maceiras	3	6	2
6	(Germany) O Otte	6	6
(United Kingdom) J Ward	3	3
WC	(Turkey) E Kırkın	2	6	4
(Turkey) C İlkel	6	4	6
(Brazil) J Menezes	7	6
Q	(Turkey) A Çelikbilek	5	1
(Germany) T Kamke	4	2
2	(France) C Moutet	6	6

Second round
8	(Austria) L Miedler	6	7^{7}
(France) E Benchetrit	3	6^{2}
(France) A Hoang	6^{0}	6	6
(Portugal) G Oliveira	7^{7}	3	2
6	(Germany) O Otte	3	4
(Turkey) C İlkel	6	6
(Brazil) J Menezes	4	0
2	(France) C Moutet	6	6

Quarterfinals
8	(Austria) L Miedler	4	5
(France) A Hoang	6	7
(Turkey) C İlkel	6^{4}	3
2	(France) C Moutet	7^{7}	6

Semifinals
(France) A Hoang	6	5	0
2	(France) C Moutet	2	7	6
