= 2020 Challenger Banque Nationale de Drummondville – Doubles =

Doubles
- 2020 Challenger Banque Nationale de Drummondville

Final
- Champions: (France) Manuel Guinard (France) Arthur Rinderknech
- Runners-up: (Dominican Republic) Roberto Cid Subervi (Portugal) Gonçalo Oliveira
- Score: 7–6^{(7–4)}, 7–6^{(7–3)}

Events
Singles	Doubles
- Challenger de Drummondville

Scott Clayton and Adil Shamasdin were the defending champions but only Clayton chose to defend his title, partnering Liam Broady. Clayton lost in the quarterfinals to Manuel Guinard and Arthur Rinderknech.

Guinard and Rinderknech won the title after defeating Roberto Cid Subervi and Gonçalo Oliveira 7–6^{(7–4)}, 7–6^{(7–3)} in the final.

== Seeds ==
1. (South Korea) Nam Ji-sung / (South Korea) Song Min-kyu (quarterfinals)
2. (Philippines) Treat Huey / (United States) Nathaniel Lammons (semifinals)
3. (Australia) Andrew Harris / (Australia) Max Purcell (first round)
4. (United States) James Cerretani / (United States) Maxime Cressy (first round, retired)

== Draw ==
Key

- Q = Qualifier
- WC = Wild card
- LL = Lucky loser
- Alt = Alternate
- ITF = ITF entry
- PR = Protected ranking
- SR = Special ranking
- SE = Special exempt
- JE = Junior exempt
- JR = Junior Accelerator Programme entrant
- CO = College Accelerator Programme entrant
- NG = Next Gen Accelerator Program entrant
- w/o = Walkover
- r = Retired
- d = Defaulted

First round
1	(South Korea) J-s Nam (South Korea) M-k Song	6	6
WC	(Canada) Razvan Baiant (Canada) Washi Gervais	2	2
WC	(Canada) A Galarneau (Canada) B Schnur	3	3
(Dominican Republic) R Cid Subervi (Portugal) G Oliveira	6	6
4	(United States) J Cerretani (United States) M Cressy	3^{r}
(United States) K Lovett (United States) H Reese	2
(Bolivia) B Arias (Poland) K Drzewiecki	6^{5}	6	[6]
(Japan) Shintaro Imai (Japan) G Soeda	7^{7}	1	[10]
(France) M Guinard (France) A Rinderknech	5	6	[13]
(United Kingdom) L Glasspool (United States) A Lawson	7	4	[11]
(United Kingdom) L Broady (United Kingdom) S Clayton	6	6^{4}	[10]
3	(Australia) A Harris (Australia) M Purcell	2	7^{7}	[8]
(United States) H Johnson (United States) Y Johnson	6^{4}	6	[10]
(Finland) H Heliövaara (Finland) P Niklas-Salminen	7^{7}	4	[8]
WC	(Canada) Kamen Damov (Canada) David Volfson	4	2
2	(Philippines) T Huey (United States) N Lammons	6	6

Quarterfinals
1	(South Korea) J-s Nam (South Korea) M-k Song	6	6^{3}	[8]
(Dominican Republic) R Cid Subervi (Portugal) G Oliveira	4	7^{7}	[10]
(United States) K Lovett (United States) H Reese	7	4	[4]
(Japan) S Imai (Japan) G Soeda	5	6	[10]
(France) M Guinard (France) A Rinderknech	6	6
(United Kingdom) L Broady (United Kingdom) S Clayton	2	1
(United States) H Johnson (United States) Y Johnson	5	4
2	(Philippines) T Huey (United States) N Lammons	7	6

Semifinals
(Dominican Republic) R Cid Subervi (Portugal) G Oliveira	6	3	[10]
(Japan) S Imai (Japan) G Soeda	1	6	[7]
(France) M Guinard (France) A Rinderknech	6	4	[10]
2	(Philippines) T Huey (United States) N Lammons	4	6	[1]

Final
(Dominican Republic) R Cid Subervi (Portugal) G Oliveira	6^{4}	6^{3}
(France) M Guinard (France) A Rinderknech	7^{7}	7^{7}
