= 2020 I.ČLTK Prague Open =

- Date: 17–23 August 2020
- Edition: 27th
- Category: ATP Challenger Tour
- Prize money: $125,000
- Surface: Clay
- Location: Prague, Czech Republic

Champions

Singles
- (Switzerland) Stan Wawrinka

Doubles
- (France) Pierre-Hugues Herbert / (France) Arthur Rinderknech
- I.ČLTK Prague Open

The 2020 I.ČLTK Prague Open is a professional tennis tournament played on outdoor clay courts. It was part of the 2020 ATP Challenger Tour. It took place only once in Prague, Czech Republic between 17 August and 6 September 2020 and has been abolished ever since.

== ATP singles main-draw entrants ==
=== Seeds ===
Country	Player	Rank^{1}	Seed
SUI	Stan Wawrinka	17	1
CZE	Jiří Veselý	65	2
FRA	Pierre-Hugues Herbert	71	3
GER	Philipp Kohlschreiber	74	4
SVK	Jozef Kovalík	122	5
IND	Sumit Nagal	127	6
SUI	Henri Laaksonen	137	7
BLR	Ilya Ivashka	138	8
SLO	Blaž Rola	141	9
GER	Yannick Maden	149	10
BEL	Kimmer Coppejans	154	11
SVK	Martin Kližan	159	12
FRA	Arthur Rinderknech	161	13
LAT	Ernests Gulbis	162	14
AUT	Sebastian Ofner	163	15
CAN	Steven Diez	165	16

- ^{1} Rankings are as of 16 March 2020.

=== Other entrants ===
The following players received wildcards into the singles main draw:

- (Czech Republic) Jonáš Forejtek
- (Czech Republic) Jiří Lehečka
- (Czech Republic) Andrew Paulson
- (Czech Republic) Michael Vrbenský
- (Switzerland) Stan Wawrinka

The following players received entry into the singles main draw using a protected ranking:

- (Belgium) Arthur De Greef
- (Russia) Andrey Kuznetsov

The following players received entry from the qualifying draw:

- (Czech Republic) Petr Nouza
- (Czech Republic) Jan Šátral

== Champions ==
=== Men's singles ===
- (Switzerland) Stan Wawrinka def. (Russia) Aslan Karatsev 7–6^{(7–2)}, 6–4.

=== Men's doubles ===
- (France) Pierre-Hugues Herbert / (France) Arthur Rinderknech def. (Czech Republic) Zdeněk Kolář / (Czech Republic) Lukáš Rosol 6–3, 6–4.
