= 2022 Poznań Open =

Professional tennis tournament

- Date: 30 May – 5 June
- Edition: 18th
- Surface: Clay
- Location: Poznań, Poland
- Venue: Park Tenisowy Olimpia

Champions

Singles
- (France) Arthur Rinderknech

Doubles
- (United States) Hunter Reese / (Poland) Szymon Walków
- Poznań Open

The 2022 Poznań Open was a professional tennis tournament played on clay courts. It was the 18th edition of the tournament which was part of the 2022 ATP Challenger Tour. It took place at the Park Tenisowy Olimpia in Poznań, Poland from 30 May to 5 June 2022.

== Singles main-draw entrants ==
=== Seeds ===
Country	Player	Rank^{1}	Seed
FRA	Arthur Rinderknech	68	1
SUI	Henri Laaksonen	96	2
COL	Daniel Elahi Galán	107	3
TPE	Tseng Chun-hsin	109	4
CHI	Tomás Barrios Vera	138	5
FRA	Manuel Guinard	146	6
FRA	Hugo Grenier	151	7
ARG	Camilo Ugo Carabelli	155	8

- ^{1} Rankings are as of 23 May 2022.

=== Other entrants ===
The following players received wildcards into the singles main draw:

- (Sweden) Leo Borg
- (Poland) Jerzy Janowicz
- (Bosnia and Herzegovina) Aldin Šetkić

The following player received entry into the singles main draw using a protected ranking:

- (Hungary) Attila Balázs

The following players received entry into the singles main draw as alternates:

- (Chile) Gonzalo Lama
- (Argentina) Genaro Alberto Olivieri

The following players received entry from the qualifying draw:

- (Brazil) Daniel Dutra da Silva
- (Germany) Elmar Ejupovic
- (Poland) Maks Kaśnikowski
- (Ukraine) Georgii Kravchenko
- (Ukraine) Oleksii Krutykh
- (Poland) Daniel Michalski

== Champions ==
=== Singles ===
- (France) Arthur Rinderknech def. (Chile) Tomás Barrios Vera 6–3, 7–6^{(7–2)}.

=== Doubles ===
- (United States) Hunter Reese / (Poland) Szymon Walków def. (Czech Republic) Marek Gengel / (Czech Republic) Adam Pavlásek 1–6, 6–3, [10–6].
