= 2019 Amex-Istanbul Challenger =

- Date: 9–15 September
- Edition: 32nd
- Surface: Hard
- Location: Istanbul, Turkey

Champions

Singles
- (France) Ugo Humbert

Doubles
- (Kazakhstan) Andrey Golubev / (Kazakhstan) Aleksandr Nedovyesov
← 2018 ·	Amex-Istanbul Challenger	· 2020 →

The 2019 Amex-Istanbul Challenger was a professional tennis tournament played on hard courts. It was the 32nd edition of the tournament which was part of the 2019 ATP Challenger Tour. It took place in Istanbul, Turkey between 9 and 15 September 2019.

== Singles main-draw entrants ==
=== Seeds ===
Country	Player	Rank^{1}	Seed
FRA	Ugo Humbert	63	1
~~ESP~~	~~Marcel Granollers~~	~~91~~	~~2~~
ROU	Marius Copil	93	3
~~TUN~~	~~Malek Jaziri~~	~~103~~	~~4~~
UZB	Denis Istomin	139	5
CZE	Lukáš Rosol	152	6
FRA	Maxime Janvier	176	7
IND	Ramkumar Ramanathan	177	8
ITA	Roberto Marcora	180	9
BEL	Ruben Bemelmans	181	10
GBR	Jay Clarke	187	11
ESP	Nicola Kuhn	191	12
KAZ	Aleksandr Nedovyesov	226	13
RUS	Roman Safiullin	230	14
~~COL~~	~~Santiago Giraldo~~	~~232~~	~~15~~
SLO	Blaž Kavčič	239	16
ITA	Matteo Viola	240	17

- ^{1} Rankings are as of 26 August 2019.

=== Other entrants ===
The following players received wildcards into the singles main draw:

- (Turkey) Baran Cengiz
- (Turkey) Marsel İlhan
- (Denmark) Holger Rune
- (Russia) Kirill Saplin
- (Turkey) Mert Naci Türker

The following players received entry into the singles main draw as alternates:

- (Netherlands) Sander Arends
- (Romania) Victor Vlad Cornea
- (Russia) Mikhail Elgin
- (Czech Republic) Marek Gengel
- (Turkey) Burak Can Yılmaz

== Champions ==
=== Singles ===
- (France) Ugo Humbert def. (Uzbekistan) Denis Istomin 6–2, 6–2.

=== Doubles ===
- (Kazakhstan) Andrey Golubev / (Kazakhstan) Aleksandr Nedovyesov def. (Czech Republic) Marek Gengel / (Czech Republic) Lukáš Rosol Walkover.
