= 2026 Geneva Open – Doubles =

Doubles
- 2026 Geneva Open

Final
- Champions: (Monaco) Romain Arneodo (Australia) Marc Polmans
- Runners-up: (India) Yuki Bhambri (New Zealand) Michael Venus
- Score: 3–6, 7–6^{(7–2)}, [10–7]

Events
Singles	Doubles
- Geneva Open

Romain Arneodo and Marc Polmans defeated Yuki Bhambri and Michael Venus in the final, 3–6, 7–6^{(7–2)}, [10–7] to win the doubles tennis title at the 2026 Geneva Open. It was the first ATP Tour title for Polmans and fourth for Arneodo.

Sadio Doumbia and Fabien Reboul were the reigning champions, but chose to compete in Hamburg instead.

== Seeds ==
1. (United States) Austin Krajicek / (Croatia) Nikola Mektić (first round)
2. (United States) Robert Cash / (United States) JJ Tracy (first round)
3. (India) Yuki Bhambri / (New Zealand) Michael Venus (final)
4. (Brazil) Marcelo Melo / (Argentina) Andrés Molteni (first round)

== Draw ==
Key

- Q = Qualifier
- WC = Wild card
- LL = Lucky loser
- Alt = Alternate
- ITF = ITF entry
- PR = Protected ranking
- SR = Special ranking
- SE = Special exempt
- JE = Junior exempt
- JR = Junior Accelerator Programme entrant
- CO = College Accelerator Programme entrant
- NG = Next Gen Accelerator Program entrant
- w/o = Walkover
- r = Retired
- d = Defaulted

=== Draw ===
First round
1	(United States) A Krajicek (Croatia) N Mektić	7	5	[10]
(United States) V Kirkov (Netherlands) B Stevens	5	7	[12]
(Germany) C Frantzen (Netherlands) R Haase	6^{5}	7	[10]
WC	(Greece) Pe Tsitsipas (Greece) S Tsitsipas	7^{7}	5	[6]
4	(Brazil) M Melo (Argentina) A Molteni	7^{10}	6^{4}	[5]
(United States) T Fritz (United States) L Tien	6^{8}	7^{7}	[10]
(Argentina) M González (Mexico) S González	1	5
(Monaco) R Arneodo (Australia) M Polmans	6	7
WC	(Switzerland) J Paul (Switzerland) D Stricker	7	6
(United States) R Galloway (Australia) J Peers	5	2
Alt	(Mexico) MÁ Reyes-Varela (United Kingdom) M Willis	2	4
3	(India) Y Bhambri (New Zealand) M Venus	6	6
(Uruguay) A Behar (Croatia) M Pavić	2	6	[6]
(Netherlands) S Arends (Netherlands) D Pel	6	4	[10]
(Czech Republic) A Pavlásek (Czech Republic) P Rikl	6	7
2	(United States) R Cash (United States) JJ Tracy	3	5

Quarterfinals
(United States) V Kirkov (Netherlands) B Stevens	6^{5}	6	[9]
(Germany) C Frantzen (Netherlands) R Haase	7^{7}	3	[11]
(United States) T Fritz (United States) L Tien
(Monaco) R Arneodo (Australia) M Polmans	w/o
WC	(Switzerland) J Paul (Switzerland) D Stricker	6^{4}	5
3	(India) Y Bhambri (New Zealand) M Venus	7^{7}	7
(Netherlands) S Arends (Netherlands) D Pel	2	2
(Czech Republic) A Pavlásek (Czech Republic) P Rikl	6	6

Semifinals
(Germany) C Frantzen (Netherlands) R Haase	6^{4}	2
(Monaco) R Arneodo (Australia) M Polmans	7^{7}	6
3	(India) Y Bhambri (New Zealand) M Venus	7	6
(Czech Republic) A Pavlásek (Czech Republic) P Rikl	5	3

Final
(Monaco) R Arneodo (Australia) M Polmans	3	7^{7}	[10]
3	(India) Y Bhambri (New Zealand) M Venus	6	6^{2}	[7]
