= 2026 Geneva Open =

ATP tennis tournament

- Date: 17–23 May
- Edition: 23rd
- Category: ATP Tour 250
- Draw: 28S /16Q /16D
- Surface: Clay
- Location: Geneva, Switzerland
- Venue: Tennis Club de Genève

Champions

Singles
- (United States) Learner Tien

Doubles
- (Monaco) Romain Arneodo / (Australia) Marc Polmans
- Geneva Open

The 2026 Gonet Geneva Open was an ATP 250 tennis tournament to be played on outdoor clay courts. It will be the 23rd edition of the Geneva Open and part of the ATP Tour 250 series of the 2026 ATP Tour. It will take place at the Tennis Club de Genève in Geneva, Switzerland, from 17 May until 23 May 2026.

== Champions ==
=== Singles ===
- (United States) Learner Tien def. (Argentina) Mariano Navone, 3–6, 6–3, 7–5

=== Doubles ===
- (Monaco) Romain Arneodo / (Australia) Marc Polmans def. (India) Yuki Bhambri / (New Zealand) Michael Venus, 3–6, 7–6^{(7–2)}, [10–7]

== Singles main draw entrants ==
=== Seeds ===
Country	Player	Rank^{1}	Seed
USA	Taylor Fritz	7	1
KAZ	Alexander Bublik	11	2
GBR	Cameron Norrie	19	3
USA	Learner Tien	21	4
FRA	Arthur Rinderknech	24	5
NOR	Casper Ruud	25	6
~~CHI~~	~~Alejandro Tabilo~~	~~35~~	~~7~~
ESP	Jaume Munar	38	8

- Rankings are as of 4 May 2026.

=== Other entrants ===
The following players received wildcards into the singles main draw:

- (Serbia) Laslo Djere
- (Greece) Stefanos Tsitsipas
- (Switzerland) Stan Wawrinka

The following players received entry from the qualifying draw:

- (United States) Nishesh Basavareddy
- (Lithuania) Edas Butvilas
- (Argentina) Francisco Comesaña
- (France) Clément Tabur

The following player received entry as a lucky loser:

- (Italy) Raúl Brancaccio
- (Australia) James Duckworth

=== Withdrawals ===
- (Portugal) Nuno Borges → replaced by (Argentina) Sebastián Báez
- (Canada) Gabriel Diallo → replaced by (Italy) Lorenzo Sonego
- (Hungary) Márton Fucsovics → replaced by (Belgium) Raphaël Collignon
- (Hungary) Fábián Marozsán → replaced by (Czech Republic) Vít Kopřiva
- (Chile) Alejandro Tabilo → replaced by (Italy) Raúl Brancaccio
- (Netherlands) Botic van de Zandschulp → replaced by (Australia) James Duckworth

== Doubles main draw entrants ==
=== Seeds ===
Country	Player	Country	Player	Rank^{1}	Seed
USA	Austin Krajicek	CRO	Nikola Mektić	63	1
USA	Robert Cash	USA	JJ Tracy	67	2
IND	Yuki Bhambri	NZL	Michael Venus	75	3
BRA	Marcelo Melo	ARG	Andrés Molteni	76	4

- Rankings are as of 4 May 2026.

=== Other entrants ===
The following pairs received wildcards into the doubles main draw:

- (Switzerland) Jakub Paul / (Switzerland) Dominic Stricker
- (Greece) Petros Tsitsipas / (Greece) Stefanos Tsitsipas

The following pair received entry as alternates:

- (Mexico) Miguel Ángel Reyes-Varela / (United Kingdom) Marcus Willis

=== Withdrawals ===
- (Ecuador) Diego Hidalgo / (Chile) Alejandro Tabilo → replaced by (Mexico) Miguel Ángel Reyes-Varela / (United Kingdom) Marcus Willis
