= 2020 Challenger Banque Nationale de Drummondville =

- Date: February 16 – 23
- Edition: 14th
- Category: ATP Challenger Tour
- Surface: Hard (indoor)
- Location: Drummondville, Canada

Champions

Singles
- (United States) Maxime Cressy

Doubles
- (France) Manuel Guinard / (France) Arthur Rinderknech
- Challenger de Drummondville

The 2020 Challenger Banque Nationale de Drummondville was a professional tennis tournament played on indoor hard courts. It was the 14th edition of the tournament and part of the 2020 ATP Challenger Tour. It took place in Drummondville, Canada between February 16 and 23, 2020.

== Singles main-draw entrants ==
=== Seeds ===
Country	Player	Rank^{1}	Seed
GER	Dominik Koepfer	94	1
JPN	Go Soeda	112	2
AUS	Christopher O'Connell	115	3
CAN	Brayden Schnur	121	4
AUS	Andrew Harris	189	5
USA	Michael Mmoh	192	6
AUS	Max Purcell	204	7
DOM	Roberto Cid Subervi	219	8
GBR	Liam Broady	226	9
GER	Tobias Kamke	235	10
USA	Sebastian Korda	236	11
FRA	Arthur Rinderknech	240	12
KOR	Nam Ji-sung	245	13
USA	Maxime Cressy	258	14
JPN	Yosuke Watanuki	262	15
POR	Gonçalo Oliveira	276	16

- ^{1} Rankings are as of February 10, 2020.

=== Other entrants ===
The following players received wildcards into the singles main draw:

- (Canada) Taha Baadi
- (Canada) Kamen Damov
- (Canada) Filip Peliwo
- (Canada) Ilya Tiraspolsky
- (Canada) David Volfson

The following player received entry into the singles main draw using a protected ranking:

- (United States) Raymond Sarmiento

The following player received entry into the singles main draw as an alternate:

- (Bolivia) Boris Arias

The following players received entry from the qualifying draw:

- (Canada) Razvan Baiant
- (Canada) Washi Gervais

The following player received entry as a lucky loser:

- (France) Tony Bourcet

== Champions ==
=== Singles ===
- (United States) Maxime Cressy def. (France) Arthur Rinderknech 6–7^{(4–7)}, 6–4, 6–4.

=== Doubles ===
- (France) Manuel Guinard / (France) Arthur Rinderknech def. (Dominican Republic) Roberto Cid Subervi / (Portugal) Gonçalo Oliveira 7–6^{(7–4)}, 7–6^{(7–3)}.
