= Marek Gengel =

Czech tennis player (born 1995)

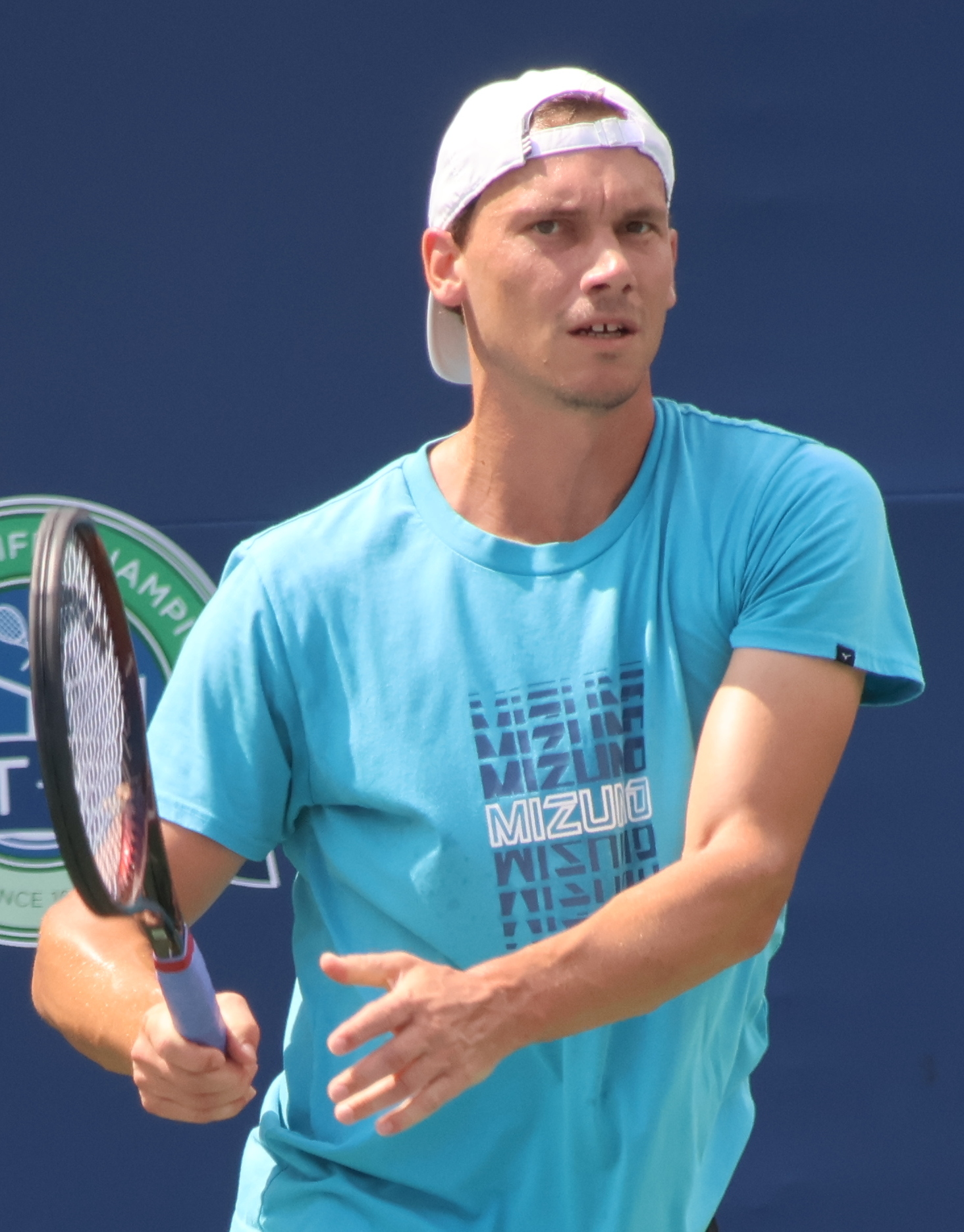
- Gengel at the 2025 Washington Open
- Country (sports): Czech Republic
- Born: 17 September 1995 (age 31) Rakovník, Czech Republic
- Height: 1.85 m (6 ft 1 in)
- Plays: Right-handed (two-handed backhand)
- Coach: Katerina Gengelova
- Prize money: US $295,233

Singles
- Career record: 0–0
- Career titles: 0
- Highest ranking: No. 229 (3 February 2025)
- Current ranking: No. 409 (9 November 2026)

Doubles
- Career record: 0–0
- Career titles: 0; 1 Challenger
- Highest ranking: No. 148 (20 March 2023)
- Current ranking: No. 1,026 (9 November 2026)
- Last updated on: 9 November 2026.

Marek Gengel (born 17 September 1995) is a Czech tennis player. He has a career high ATP singles ranking of world No. 229 achieved on 3 February 2025 and a career high doubles ranking of No. 148 achieved on 20 March 2023.

== Career ==
Gengel reached his first ATP Challenger Tour singles final at the 2025 Queensland International, losing to Tristan Schoolkate.

Gengel scored couple of big wins in his career over former or future Top 50 players like Jiří Lehečka, Teymuraz Gabashvili, Fábián Marozsán, Lukáš Rosol, Alexander Shevchenko and Tennys Sandgren.

== ATP Challenger Tour finals ==
=== Singles: 2 runner-up ===
Legend ATP Challenger Tour (0–2)	Finals by surface Hard (0–2)

Result	W–L	Date	Tournament	Tier	Surface	Opponent	Score
Loss	0–1	Feb 2025	Brisbane, Australia	Challenger	Hard	(Australia) Tristan Schoolkate	6–7^{(3–7)}, 6–7^{(4–7)}
Loss	0–2	Jan 2026	Nonthaburi, Thailand	Challenger	Hard	(Japan) Rio Noguchi	3–6, 4–6

=== Doubles: 6 (1 title, 5 runner-ups) ===
Legend ATP Challenger Tour (1–5)	Finals by surface Hard (1–3) Clay (0–1) Grass (0–0) Carpet (0–1)

Result	W–L	Date	Tournament	Tier	Surface	Partner	Opponents	Score
Loss	0–1	Sep 2019	Istanbul, Turkey	Challenger	Hard	(Czech Republic) Lukáš Rosol	(Kazakhstan) Andrey Golubev (Kazakhstan) Aleksandr Nedovyesov	walkover
Loss	0–2	Sep 2021	Rennes, France	Challenger	Hard (i)	(Czech Republic) Tomáš Macháč	(Netherlands) Bart Stevens (Netherlands) Tim van Rijthoven	7–6^{(7–2)}, 5–7, [3–10]
Loss	0–3	Oct 2021	Ismaning, Germany	Challenger	Carpet (i)	(Czech Republic) Tomáš Macháč	(Germany) Andre Begemann (Slovakia) Igor Zelenay	2–6, 4–6
Loss	0–4	May 2022	Poznań, Poland	Challenger	Clay	(Czech Republic) Adam Pavlásek	(United States) Hunter Reese (Poland) Szymon Walków	6–1, 3–6, [6–10]
Loss	0–5	Aug 2022	Manacor, Spain	Challenger	Hard	(Czech Republic) Lukáš Rosol	(India) Yuki Bhambri (India) Saketh Myneni	2–6, 2–6
Win	1–5	Jan 2023	Nonthaburi, Thailand	Challenger	Hard	(Czech Republic) Adam Pavlásek	(United States) Robert Galloway (Mexico) Hans Hach Verdugo	7–6^{(7–4)}, 6–4

== ITF Futures/World Tennis Tour finals ==
=== Singles: 27 (17 titles, 10 runner-ups) ===
Legend ITF Futures/WTT (17–10)	Finals by surface Hard (17–10) Clay (0–0)

Result	W–L	Date	Tournament	Tier	Surface	Opponent	Score
Loss	0–1	Mar 2017	Egypt F10, Sharm El Sheikh	Futures	Hard	(Egypt) Karim-Mohamed Maamoun	4–6, 2–6
Loss	0–2	Apr 2017	Egypt F11, Sharm El Sheikh	Futures	Hard	(Egypt) Karim-Mohamed Maamoun	4–6, 6–3, 4–6
Loss	0–3	Aug 2018	Belarus F3, Minsk	Futures	Hard	(Italy) Francesco Vilardo	1–6, 3–6
Win	1–3	Oct 2019	M15 Sharm El Sheikh, Egypt	WTT	Hard	(Italy) Alessandro Bega	6–2, 5–7, 6–1
Win	2–3	Oct 2019	M15 Sharm El Sheikh, Egypt	WTT	Hard	(Morocco) Adam Moundir	6–2, 6–3
Loss	2–4	Oct 2019	M15 Sharm El Sheikh, Egypt	WTT	Hard	(Egypt) Karim-Mohamed Maamoun	4–6, 6–4, 4–6
Loss	2–5	Feb 2020	M15 Sharm El Sheikh, Egypt	WTT	Hard	(Italy) Alessandro Bega	4–6, 2–6
Loss	2–6	Feb 2020	M15 Sharm El Sheikh, Egypt	WTT	Hard	(Italy) Alessandro Bega	4–6, 5–7
Win	3–6	Feb 2021	M15 Sharm El Sheikh, Egypt	WTT	Hard	(Czech Republic) Jan Šátral	6–2, 6–2
Win	4–6	Oct 2021	M15 Sharm El Sheikh, Egypt	WTT	Hard	(Hungary) Péter Fajta	6–4, 6–0
Win	5–6	Nov 2021	M15 Sharm El Sheikh, Egypt	WTT	Hard	(Italy) Daniele Capecchi	6–7^{(6–8)}, 6–2, 6–3
Win	6–6	Nov 2021	M15 Sharm El Sheikh, Egypt	WTT	Hard	(Belgium) Loïc Cloes	6–0, 6–4
Loss	6–7	Feb 2022	M25 Sharm El Sheikh, Egypt	WTT	Hard	(Chinese Taipei) Hsu Yu-hsiou	3–6, 2–6
Win	7–7	Nov 2022	M25 Sharm El Sheikh, Egypt	WTT	Hard	(Egypt) Amr Elsayed	6–3, 6–1
Win	8–7	Dec 2022	M25 Trnava, Slovakia	WTT	Hard (i)	(Spain) Daniel Rincón	6–7^{(6–8)}, 6–3, 6–3
Win	9–7	Feb 2024	M15 Sharm El Sheikh, Egypt	WTT	Hard	Aliaksandr Liaonenka	6–3, 6–2
Win	10–7	Feb 2024	M15 Sharm El Sheikh, Egypt	WTT	Hard	(Estonia) Oliver Ojakäär	6–3, 6–3
Win	11–7	Feb 2024	M15 Sharm El Sheikh, Egypt	WTT	Hard	(Netherlands) Niels Visker	6–2, 6–2
Win	12–7	Sep 2024	M15 Sharm El Sheikh, Egypt	WTT	Hard	(Italy) Alexandr Binda	6–4, 6–3
Win	13–7	Sep 2024	M15 Sharm El Sheikh, Egypt	WTT	Hard	(Latvia) Robert Strombachs	6–4, 2–6, 7–5
Win	14–7	Oct 2024	M15 Sharm El Sheikh, Egypt	WTT	Hard	(Latvia) Robert Strombachs	6–4, 7–6^{(7–0)}
Loss	14–8	Oct 2024	M25 Sharm El Sheikh, Egypt	WTT	Hard	Ilia Simakin	5–7, 3–6
Loss	14–9	Oct 2024	M25 Sharm El Sheikh, Egypt	WTT	Hard	Petr Bar Biryukov	3–6, 7–5, 4–6
Loss	14–10	Nov 2024	M15 Sharm El Sheikh, Egypt	WTT	Hard	(Egypt) Fares Zakaria	6–7^{(5–7)}, 6–3, 4–6
Win	15–10	Nov 2024	M15 Sharm El Sheikh, Egypt	WTT	Hard	(Ukraine) Vadym Ursu	3–6, 6–4, 6–3
Win	16–10	Dec 2024	M15 Sharm El Sheikh, Egypt	WTT	Hard	Ilia Simakin	6–4, 6–0
Win	17–10	Dec 2024	M15 Sharm El Sheikh, Egypt	WTT	Hard	Ilia Simakin	6–1, 6–1

=== Doubles: 8 (3 titles, 5 runner-ups) ===
Legend ITF Futures/WTT (3–5)	Finals by surface Hard (2–5) Clay (1–0)

Result	W–L	Date	Tournament	Tier	Surface	Partner	Opponents	Score
Win	1–0	Jul 2017	Czech Republic F4, Ústí nad Orlicí	Futures	Clay	(Czech Republic) Matěj Vocel	(Austria) Thomas Statzberger (Austria) Dennis Novak	6–7^{(3–7)}, 6–1, [16–14]
Win	2–0	Nov 2017	Czech Republic F9, Milovice	Futures	Hard	(Poland) Szymon Walków	(Czech Republic) Filip Duda (Czech Republic) Michal Konečný	6–3, 6–7^{(4–7)}, [10–5]
Loss	2–1	Nov 2017	Czech Republic F11, Valašské Meziříčí	Futures	Hard (i)	(Czech Republic) Matěj Vocel	(Czech Republic) Filip Duda (France) Yanais Laurent	4–6, 5–7
Win	3–1	Nov 2017	Czech Republic F12, Prague	Futures	Hard (i)	(Czech Republic) Matěj Vocel	(Romania) Patrick Grigoriu (Austria) David Pichler	6–4, 6–4
Loss	3–2	Feb 2018	Egypt F4, Sharm El Sheikh	Futures	Hard	(Czech Republic) David Poljak	(Italy) Andrea Vavassori (Italy) Julian Ocleppo	5–7, 4–6
Loss	3–3	Mar 2018	Qatar F2, Doha	Futures	Hard	(Czech Republic) Matěj Vocel	(Sweden) Fred Simonsson (Belgium) Zizou Bergs	4–6, 6–3, [6–10]
Loss	3–4	Mar 2018	Qatar F3, Doha	Futures	Hard	(Czech Republic) Matěj Vocel	(China) Sun Fajing (Hong Kong) Wong Chun-hun	3–6, 3–6
Loss	3–5	Feb 2019	M15 Monastir, Tunisia	WTT	Hard	(Czech Republic) Petr Nouza	(France) Arthur Rinderknech (France) Geoffrey Blancaneaux	1–6, 4–6
