= 2021 Poznań Open =

Professional tennis tournament

- Date: 26 July – 1 August
- Edition: 17th
- Surface: Clay
- Location: Poznań, Poland
- Venue: Park Tenisowy Olimpia

Champions

Singles
- (Spain) Bernabé Zapata Miralles

Doubles
- (Czech Republic) Zdeněk Kolář / (Czech Republic) Jiří Lehečka
- Poznań Open

The 2021 Poznań Open was a professional tennis tournament played on clay courts. It was the seventeenth edition of the tournament which was part of the 2021 ATP Challenger Tour. It took place at the Park Tenisowy Olimpia in Poznań, Poland from 26 July to 1 August 2021.

== Singles main-draw entrants ==
=== Seeds ===
Country	Player	Rank^{1}	Seed
ESP	Bernabé Zapata Miralles	121	1
NED	Botic van de Zandschulp	128	2
~~SUI~~	~~Henri Laaksonen~~	~~132~~	~~3~~
~~FRA~~	~~Hugo Gaston~~	~~155~~	~~4~~
CZE	Zdeněk Kolář	179	5
FRA	Enzo Couacaud	180	6
KAZ	Dmitry Popko	187	7
ARG	Guido Andreozzi	198	8

- ^{1} Rankings are as of 19 July 2021.

=== Other entrants ===
The following players received wildcards into the singles main draw:

- (Sweden) Leo Borg
- (Poland) Daniel Michalski
- (Poland) Aleksander Orlikowski

The following player received entry into the singles main draw as a special exempt:

- (Argentina) Nicolás Kicker

The following players received entry into the singles main draw as alternates:

- (Argentina) Pedro Cachin
- (Czech Republic) Jonáš Forejtek

The following players received entry from the qualifying draw:

- (Portugal) João Domingues
- (Germany) Elmar Ejupovic
- (Czech Republic) David Poljak
- (Russia) Alexander Shevchenko

The following players received entry as lucky losers:

- (France) Evan Furness
- (Serbia) Miljan Zekić

== Champions ==
=== Singles ===
- (Spain) Bernabé Zapata Miralles def. (Czech Republic) Jiří Lehečka 6–3, 6–2.

=== Doubles ===
- (Czech Republic) Zdeněk Kolář / (Czech Republic) Jiří Lehečka def. (Poland) Karol Drzewiecki / (Australia) Aleksandar Vukic 6–4, 3–6, [10–5].
