= 2022 Poznań Open – Doubles =

Doubles
- 2022 Poznań Open

Final
- Champions: (United States) Hunter Reese (Poland) Szymon Walków
- Runners-up: (Czech Republic) Marek Gengel (Czech Republic) Adam Pavlásek
- Score: 1–6, 6–3, [10–6]

Events
Singles	Doubles
- Poznań Open

Zdeněk Kolář and Jiří Lehečka were the defending champions but chose not to defend their title.

Hunter Reese and Szymon Walków won the title after defeating Marek Gengel and Adam Pavlásek 1–6, 6–3, [10–6] in the final.

== Seeds ==
1. (United States) Hunter Reese / (Poland) Szymon Walków (champions)
2. (Poland) Karol Drzewiecki / (United States) Alex Lawson (quarterfinals, retired)
3. (Argentina) Renzo Olivo / (Argentina) Camilo Ugo Carabelli (withdrew)
4. (Czech Republic) Marek Gengel / (Czech Republic) Adam Pavlásek (final)

== Draw ==
Key

- Q = Qualifier
- WC = Wild card
- LL = Lucky loser
- Alt = Alternate
- ITF = ITF entry
- PR = Protected ranking
- SR = Special ranking
- SE = Special exempt
- JE = Junior exempt
- JR = Junior Accelerator Programme entrant
- CO = College Accelerator Programme entrant
- NG = Next Gen Accelerator Program entrant
- w/o = Walkover
- r = Retired
- d = Defaulted

First round
1	(United States) H Reese (Poland) S Walków	6	6
(Ukraine) O Krutykh (Ukraine) O Prihodko	3	1
(Norway) V Durasovic (Finland) P Niklas-Salminen	6	6
Alt	(Poland) M Kaśnikowski (Poland) Dawid Taczała	2	3
Alt	(Switzerland) J Nikles (Argentina) JB Torres	3	6	[10]
(Brazil) D Dutra da Silva (Argentina) GA Olivieri	6	4	[1]
(Chile) T Barrios Vera (Spain) C Gómez-Herrera	6	6
(Canada) S Diez (Serbia) N Milojević	3	2
(Kazakhstan) D Popko; A Shevchenko	3	3
4	(Czech Republic) M Gengel (Czech Republic) A Pavlásek	6	6
(India) A Chandrasekar (India) VS Prashanth	4	2
WC	(Ukraine) G Kravchenko (Poland) F Peliwo	6	6
(Germany) Lucas Gerch (Zimbabwe) CJ Lock	2	3
2	(Poland) K Drzewiecki (United States) A Lawson	6	6

Quarterfinals
1	(United States) H Reese (Poland) S Walków	7	7^{10}
(Norway) V Durasovic (Finland) P Niklas-Salminen	5	6^{8}
(Chile) G Lama (Argentina) F Mena	3	1
Alt	(Switzerland) J Nikles (Argentina) JB Torres	6	6
(Chile) T Barrios Vera (Spain) C Gómez-Herrera	6^{7}	4
4	(Czech Republic) M Gengel (Czech Republic) A Pavlásek	7^{9}	6
WC	(Ukraine) G Kravchenko (Poland) F Peliwo	7^{7}	2
2	(Poland) K Drzewiecki (United States) A Lawson	6^{4}	1^{r}

Semifinals
1	(United States) H Reese (Poland) S Walków	6	7^{10}
Alt	(Switzerland) J Nikles (Argentina) JB Torres	3	6^{8}
4	(Czech Republic) M Gengel (Czech Republic) A Pavlásek	6	6
WC	(Ukraine) G Kravchenko (Poland) F Peliwo	3	2

Final
1	(United States) H Reese (Poland) S Walków	1	6	[10]
4	(Czech Republic) M Gengel (Czech Republic) A Pavlásek	6	3	[6]
