= 2021 Poznań Open – Singles =

2021 ATP Challenger Tour

Singles
- 2021 Poznań Open

Final
- Champion: (Spain) Bernabé Zapata Miralles
- Runner-up: (Czech Republic) Jiří Lehečka
- Score: 6–3, 6–2

Events
Singles	Doubles
- Poznań Open

Tommy Robredo was the defending champion but chose not to defend his title.

Bernabé Zapata Miralles won the title after defeating Jiří Lehečka 6–3, 6–2 in the final.

== Seeds ==
1. (Spain) Bernabé Zapata Miralles (champion)
2. (Netherlands) Botic van de Zandschulp (quarterfinals)
3. (Switzerland) Henri Laaksonen (withdrew)
4. (France) Hugo Gaston (withdrew)
5. (Czech Republic) Zdeněk Kolář (quarterfinals)
6. (France) Enzo Couacaud (first round)
7. (Kazakhstan) Dmitry Popko (semifinals)
8. (Argentina) Guido Andreozzi (first round)

== Draw ==
Key

- Q = Qualifier
- WC = Wild card
- LL = Lucky loser
- Alt = Alternate
- ITF = ITF entry
- PR = Protected ranking
- SR = Special ranking
- SE = Special exempt
- JE = Junior exempt
- JR = Junior Accelerator Programme entrant
- CO = College Accelerator Programme entrant
- NG = Next Gen Accelerator Program entrant
- w/o = Walkover
- r = Retired
- d = Defaulted

=== Finals ===
Semifinals
1	(Spain) Bernabé Zapata Miralles	1	7	7
7	(Kazakhstan) Dmitry Popko	6	5	5
Q	(Russia) A Shevchenko	4	2
(Czech Republic) Jiří Lehečka	6	6

Final
1	(Spain) Bernabé Zapata Miralles	6	6
(Czech Republic) Jiří Lehečka	3	2

=== Top half ===
First round
1	(Spain) B Zapata Miralles	6	6
(Belgium) K Coppejans	1	1
(Germany) M Moraing	6	6
(Germany) T Kamke	4	2
(Argentina) F Mena	6	0	6
(Netherlands) J de Jong	3	6	4
(France) A Müller	6	6
6	(France) E Couacaud	3	2
LL	(France) E Furness	2	5
SE	(Argentina) N Kicker	6	7
WC	(Poland) Aleksander Orlikowski	3	5
(France) M Guinard	6	7
(France) M Janvier	3	2
(Italy) R Marcora	6	6
(Czech Republic) V Kopřiva	4	6	5
7	(Kazakhstan) D Popko	6	4	7

Second round
1	(Spain) B Zapata Miralles	4	7	6
(Germany) M Moraing	6	5	3
(Argentina) F Mena	3	2
(France) A Müller	6	6
SE	(Argentina) N Kicker	6	6
(France) M Guinard	2	4
(Italy) R Marcora	0	3
7	(Kazakhstan) D Popko	6	6

Quarterfinals
1	(Spain) B Zapata Miralles	6	7^{10}
(France) A Müller	2	6^{8}
SE	(Argentina) N Kicker	6	4	2
7	(Kazakhstan) D Popko	3	6	6

Semifinals
1	(Spain) B Zapata Miralles	1	7	7
7	(Kazakhstan) D Popko	6	5	5

=== Bottom half ===
First round
5	(Czech Republic) Z Kolář	6	6
Alt	(Czech Republic) J Forejtek	4	4
Alt	(Argentina) P Cachin	6	6
Q	(Portugal) J Domingues	3	1
Q	(Germany) Elmar Ejupovic	6	6
Q	(Czech Republic) D Poljak	2	4
WC	(Sweden) Leo Borg	5	2
Q	(Russia) A Shevchenko	7	6
8	(Argentina) G Andreozzi	1	4
(Australia) A Vukic	6	6
(Czech Republic) J Lehečka	6	7
(France) T Lamasine	3	5
LL	(Serbia) M Zekić	6	7
(Portugal) G Elias	2	5
WC	(Poland) D Michalski	2	3
2	(Netherlands) B van de Zandschulp	6	6

Second round
5	(Czech Republic) Z Kolář	6	4	7
Alt	(Argentina) P Cachin	4	6	5
Q	(Germany) E Ejupovic	6^{3}	6	6^{3}
Q	(Russia) A Shevchenko	7^{7}	3	7^{7}
(Australia) A Vukic	3	4
(Czech Republic) J Lehečka	6	6
LL	(Serbia) M Zekić	4	1
2	(Netherlands) B van de Zandschulp	6	6

Quarterfinals
5	(Czech Republic) Z Kolář	4	1
Q	(Russia) A Shevchenko	6	6
(Czech Republic) J Lehečka	7	6
2	(Netherlands) B van de Zandschulp	5	3

Semifinals
Q	(Russia) A Shevchenko	4	2
(Czech Republic) J Lehečka	6	6
