= Arthur Rinderknech =

French tennis player (born 1995)

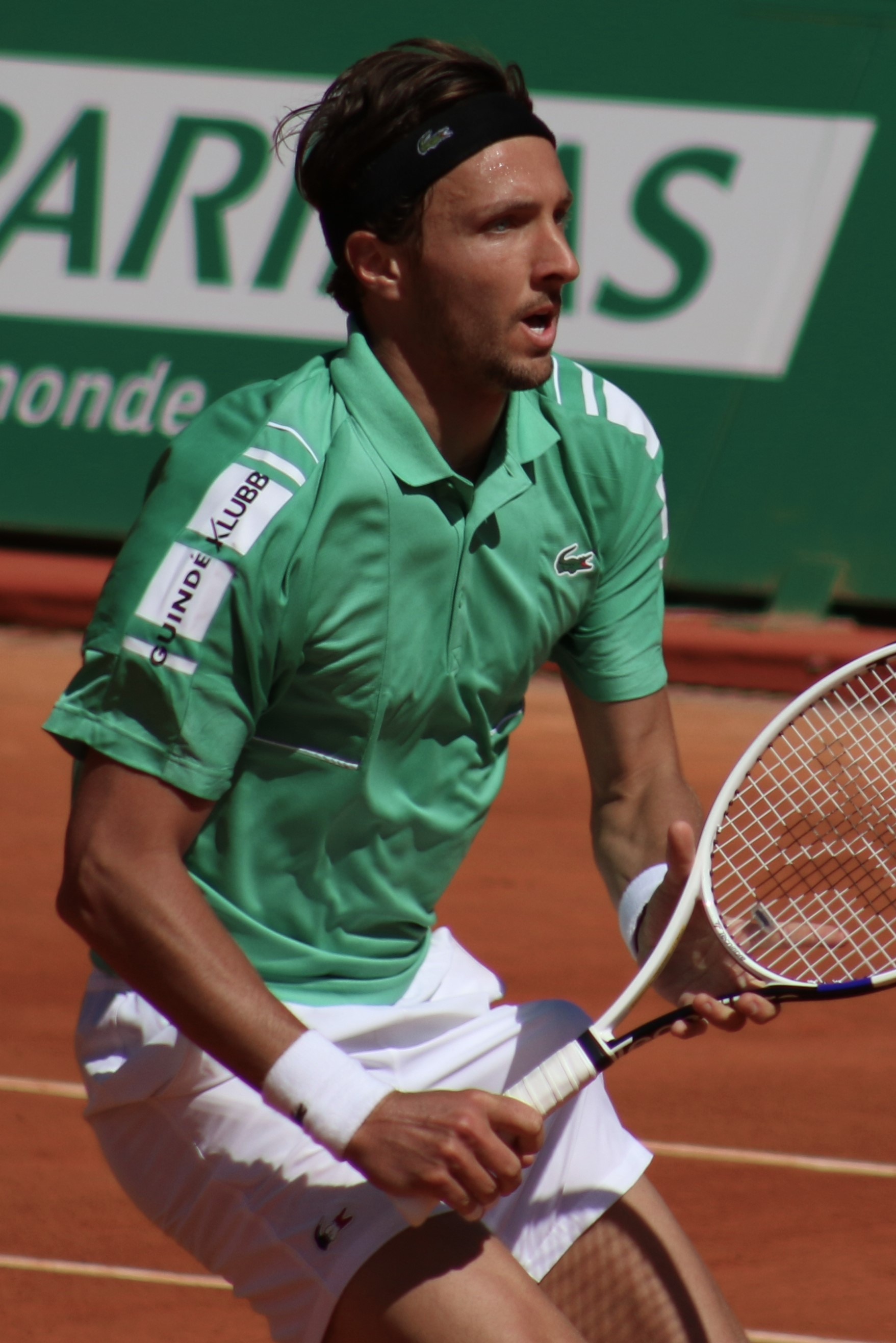
- Rinderknech at the 2022 Monte-Carlo Masters
- Country (sports): France
- Born: 23 July 1995 (age 31) Gassin, France
- Height: 1.96 m (6 ft 5 in)
- Turned pro: 2018
- Plays: Right-handed (two-handed backhand)
- College: Texas A&M-BBA
- Coach: Lucas Pouille (Jun-Sep 2025)
- Prize money: US $8,866,590

Singles
- Career record: 121–134
- Career titles: 0
- Highest ranking: No. 24 (4 May 2026)
- Current ranking: No. 58 (9 November 2026)

Grand Slam singles results
- Australian Open: 2R (2022)
- French Open: 2R (2023, 2024, 2026)
- Wimbledon: 3R (2025, 2026)
- US Open: 4R (2025)

Doubles
- Career record: 31–48
- Career titles: 0
- Highest ranking: No. 95 (9 November 2026)
- Current ranking: No. 95 (9 November 2026)

Grand Slam doubles results
- Australian Open: QF (2023)
- French Open: 3R (2025)
- Wimbledon: 1R (2022, 2023, 2024)
- US Open: 2R (2021, 2023)
- Last updated on: 9 November 2026.

Arthur Rinderknech (/rɪndərknɛʃ/; born 23 July 1995) is a French professional tennis player. He has a career-high ATP singles ranking of world No. 24 achieved on 4 May 2026 and a best doubles ranking of No. 95 reached on 9 November 2026. He is currently the No. 2 singles player from France.

His most notable career achievement is a runner-up at the 2025 Shanghai Masters, an ATP 1000-level event. He was defeated by his cousin, Valentin Vacherot, in the final.

Rinderknech represents France at the Davis Cup.

== Early life ==
Rinderknech was born in Gassin, France, to parents Pascal Rinderknech and Virginie Paquet. He started taking tennis lessons in his early childhood, at age 6, and rapidly took part in junior tournaments.

== Professional career ==
=== 2018–2020: Major singles and doubles debut ===
Rinderknech made his major main draw debut as a wildcard at the 2018 French Open in doubles partnering Florian Lakat.

Rinderknech received a main draw invitation to singles at the 2020 French Open, where he lost to Aljaž Bedene in the first round. He also got a wildcard in doubles, partnering with compatriot Manuel Guinard. The pair reached the second round.

=== 2021: ATP debut, First Major win, Maiden doubles final ===
In his debut on the ATP Tour in March, Rinderknech qualified for the main draw of the 2021 Open 13 in Marseille, France, where he reached the quarterfinals, beating Alejandro Davidovich Fokina, before losing to fellow countryman Ugo Humbert.

In May at the 2021 ATP Lyon Open, Rinderknech recorded his first win, defeating 6th seeded Jannik Sinner, the first top-20 win in his career, to reach his second career quarterfinal as a lucky loser.

Rinderknech qualified for the 2021 Wimbledon Championships main draw for the first time in his career. In the first round he lost in only the second 12 games all singles supertiebreak since that rule began two years previously against Oscar Otte 6–4, 3–6, 2–6, 7–6(5), 12–13(2), the other match being the Federer-Djokovic 2019 final.

In July, he reached the quarterfinals as a qualifier at the 2021 Swedish Open in Båstad defeating 4th seed John Millman. As a result, he made his top 100 debut on 19 July 2021. At the 2021 Swiss Open Gstaad Rinderknech defeated second seed and World No. 16 Roberto Bautista Agut, his second top-20 win, to reach the quarterfinals.

The following week, he reached the semifinals for the first time in his career at the Kitzbühel Open, losing to eventual winner Casper Ruud. As a result, he reached a new career-high of World No. 79 on 2 August 2021.

At the 2021 US Open he entered directly into the main draw for the first time and also reached the second round of a Grand Slam for the first time in his career defeating Miomir Kecmanović after a comeback from two sets down 6–7(10), 3–6, 7–5, 6–3, 6–4.

At the 2021 Moselle Open he reached his first ATP final in his career partnering Hugo Nys where they were defeated by Hubert Hurkacz and Jan Zieliński from Poland. Following a quarterfinal appearance at the 2021 Stockholm Open where he lost to defending champion, 3rd seed Denis Shapovalov, he made his debut in the top 60 at World No. 58 on 15 November 2021.

=== 2022: First ATP singles final, Top 50 debut, French No. 1 ===
Rinderknech started his 2022 season by representing France at the ATP Cup. France was in Group B alongside Russia, Italy, and Australia. He lost his first match to Roman Safiullin of Russia. He lost his second match to Jannik Sinner. He won his final match by beating James Duckworth of Australia. France ended in fourth place in Group B.

At the Adelaide International 2, he defeated 3rd seed and runner-up of the first tournament, Karen Khachanov, in the quarterfinals, and qualifier and compatriot, Corentin Moutet, in the semifinals to reach his first final on the ATP Tour. In the final, he pushed Australian wildcard, Thanasi Kokkinakis, to three sets, but he ended up losing the match. As a result of reaching the final, he made his debut in the world's top 50 at No. 48 on 17 January 2022. Ranked No. 48 in his debut at the Australian Open, he won his first match at this Major defeating Australian Alexei Popyrin in the first round. He was set to play 24th seed, Dan Evans, in the second round, but he withdrew due to a wrist injury.

In February, Rinderknech competed at the Qatar ExxonMobil Open. He beat seventh seed, Alexander Bublik, in the second round. He then upset top seed and world No. 12, Denis Shapovalov, in the quarterfinals which not only earned him his third Top 20 win of his career, but he also reached his second semifinal of the year. He lost in his semifinal match to third seed, world No. 22, and defending champion, Nikoloz Basilashvili. In Dubai, he fell in the first round to eighth seed, world No. 15, and 2018 champion, Roberto Bautista Agut.

Representing France during the Davis Cup tie against Ecuador, Rinderknech played one match and won over Emilio Gómez; France ended up beating Ecuador 4–0.

At the Indian Wells Masters, he lost in the first round to Benjamin Bonzi. Seeded third at the Arizona Classic, an ATP Challenger tournament in Phoenix, he was defeated in the second round by Liam Broady. At the Miami Open, he recorded his first win at the Masters 1000 level against Laslo Djere but lost in the second round to eighth seed, world No. 10, and defending champion, Hubert Hurkacz.

Starting his clay-court season at the Monte-Carlo Masters, Rinderknech was eliminated in the first round by 2019 champion Fabio Fognini. At the Lyon Open, he lost in the first round to Holger Rune. Ranked No. 60 at the French Open, he was defeated in the first round by Bublik. As the top seed at the Poznań Open, an ATP Challenger tournament, Rinderknech won his fourth ATP Challenger title by beating Tomás Barrios Vera in the final.

Rinderknech started his grass-court season at the BOSS Open in Stuttgart, Germany. He upset eighth seed and compatriot, Ugo Humbert, in the first round in three sets. He lost in the second round to compatriot Benjamin Bonzi. At the Halle Open, he fell in the first round of qualifying to Marc-Andrea Hüsler. Ranked No. 62 at Wimbledon, he lost in the first round to 13th seed, world No. 16, and last year semifinalist, Denis Shapovalov, in five sets. After Wimbledon, Rinderknech competed at the Salzburg Open, an ATP Challenger tournament in Austria. As the top seed, he lost in the second round to Austrian wildcard Lukas Neumayer.

At the US Open, he recorded his third Major career win against compatriot Quentin Halys. At the 2022 Moselle Open in Metz, he lost in the quarterfinals for the second time in the season to world No. 10 and second seed Hubert Hurkacz. At the 2022 Tel Aviv Open he also reached the quarterfinals defeating third seed Diego Schwartzman but lost to Roman Safiullin for the second time in the season. At the 2022 Gijón Open he reached his third tour-level semifinal for the season saving nine match points against second seed Pablo Carreño Busta in an over three hours match. At the 2022 Swiss Indoors he defeated fourth seed Marin Čilić in the first round after qualifying for the main draw. He then won against Alex Molčan to reach the quarterfinals. As a result, he became the French No. 1 in the rankings at world No. 42 on 31 October 2022 ahead of Adrian Mannarino.

Rinderknech received a wildcard to participate in his home tournament, the 2022 Rolex Paris Masters for a second year in a row.

=== 2023: United Cup debut, First Major third round ===
Rinderknech started his 2023 season by representing France at the 2023 United Cup. France was in Group F alongside Argentina and Croatia. Against Argentina, he beat Francisco Cerúndolo. France won the tie over Argentina 5–0. Against Croatia, he lost to Borna Ćorić in two tiebreaker sets. Croatia ended up winning the tie over France 3–2. France didn't qualify for the knockout stage; they ended second in Group F. Last year finalist at the Adelaide International 2, he was defeated in the first round by Marc-Andrea Hüsler. At the Australian Open, he lost in the first round to qualifier Yosuke Watanuki.

In February, Rinderknech reached the second round at the Open Sud de France in Montpellier, losing to third seed and world No. 23, Borna Ćorić. At the Rotterdam Open, he was defeated in the first round of qualifying by Jurij Rodionov. In Marseille, he lost in the first round to Leandro Riedi. As the top seed at the Teréga Open Pau–Pyrénées, he reached the semifinals where he was defeated by compatriot, Luca Van Assche, who ended up winning the tournament.

=== 2024: Two ATP quarterfinals and Masters third rounds ===
Rinderknech reached his first quarterfinal for the season in Marseille as an alternate, defeating Maxime Cressy and eight seed Jiří Lehečka in straight sets. In February, he won his sixth Challenger title at the Play In Challenger in Lille, France, defeating Joris De Loore in the final. In May, he also reached the quarterfinals in Lyon but withdrew from his match against Luciano Darderi.

In July, Rinderknech recorded his first win at Wimbledon defeating Kei Nishikori in the first round before losing to Taylor Fritz in the second round.

He reached the third round of a Masters at the 2024 National Bank Open in Montreal as a qualifier, with main draw wins over compatriot Adrian Mannarino and Flavio Cobolli. As a result he returned to the top 60 in the rankings on 12 August 2024. At the US Open, he defeated Christopher Eubanks in five sets with a super tiebreak. He lost to sixth seed Andrey Rublev in a five set match, after being two sets up.

=== 2025: Best season: Two top 5 wins, Shanghai final, top 30 ===
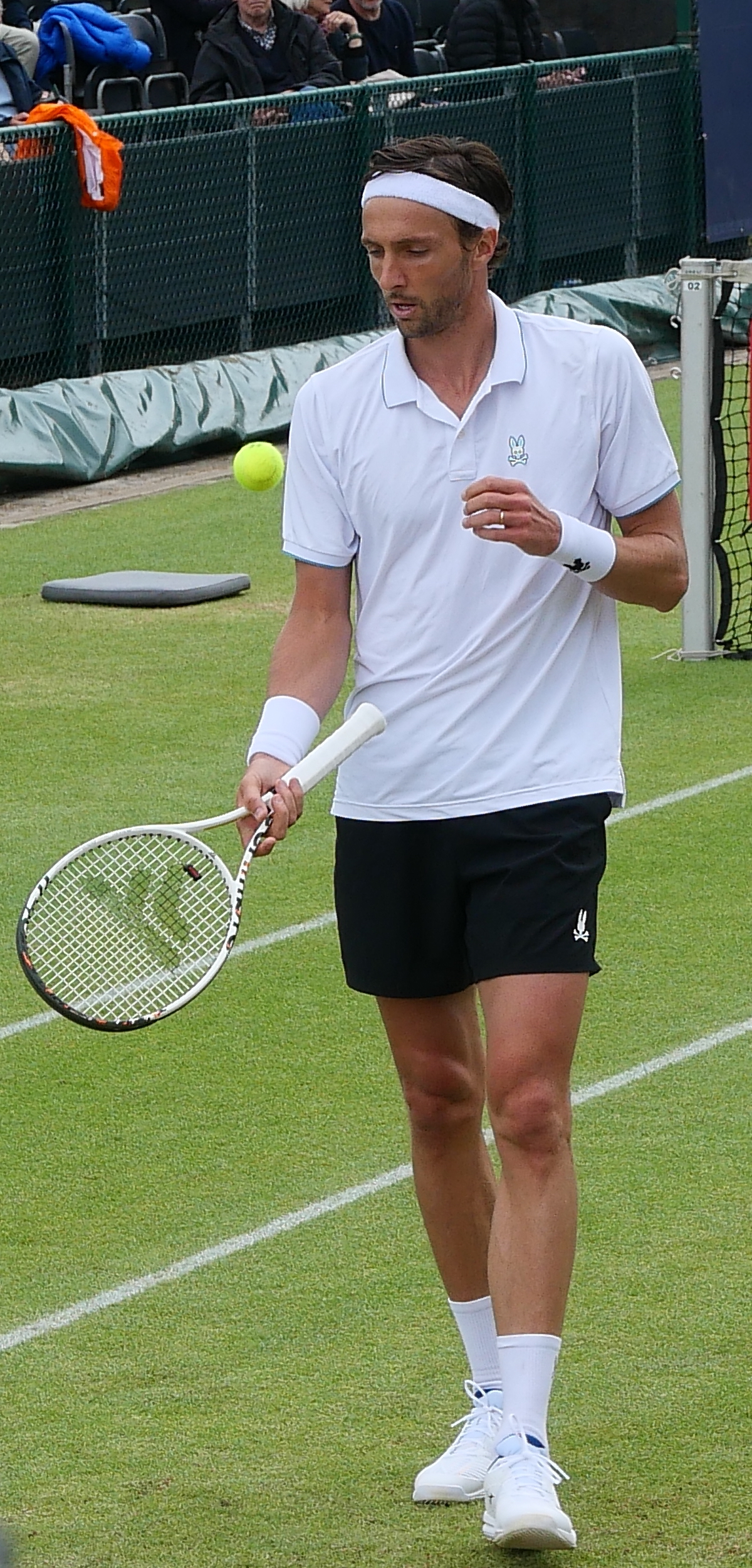
Rinderknech at the 2026 Libéma Open

In June, Rinderknech reached the second round at the Queen's Championships by defeating Ben Shelton in the first round, his first top 10 win. In July, Rinderknech reached the second round at Wimbledon by defeating third seed Alexander Zverev, his first top 5 win. He then reached the third round at the tournament for the first time by defeating Cristian Garín in five sets over two days. Rinderknech reached his first semifinal of the year at the Generali Open Kitzbühel. He lost to fellow countryman Arthur Cazaux in the semifinal.

In September at the 2025 US Open, Rinderknech reached the fourth round of a Grand Slam for the first time in his career.

At the 2025 Shanghai Masters Rinderknech reached his first final at a Masters 1000. In the third round, he defeated Alexander Zverev for a second time in the season, recording his second top 5 win. Rinderknech went on to upset 15th seed Jiří Lehečka in the fourth round, 12th seed Felix Auger-Aliassime in the quarterfinal and 16th seed Daniil Medvedev in the semifinal to reach the final. As a result he reached the top 30 at world No. 28 on 13 October 2025. He lost to qualifier Valentin Vacherot in the final.

=== 2026: Career high ranking, doubles Masters final ===
In Australia, Rinderknech represented France at the 2026 United Cup, however they failed to make it past the round robin stage. He then lost in the first round of the Australian Open in 4 sets to Fábián Marozsán.

He then lost out to Stefanos Tsitsipas in Rotterdam and, the eventual champion, Carlos Alcaraz in Qatar. He did make the quarter-final of the Dubai Championships, defeating Jack Draper en-route, however lost out to Andrey Rublev.

At Indian Wells, Rinderknech lost in the singles in the third round to Alcaraz, despite taking the first set. However, in the doubles, partnered with his cousin, Valentin Vacherot, the pair defeated Djokovic & Tsitsipas en-route to their first doubles Masters final. They lost out to Guido Andreozzi & Manuel Guinard in the final.

Rinderknech then failed to make it past the second round of any tournament, apart from retiring in the third round of Madrid, until the Geneva Open, where he lost out to Alexander Bublik in the quarter-final. On the 4th May, due to a lack of points to defend, Rinderknech reached World No. 24, his highest ranking to date.

At Roland Garros, the Frenchman lost out to eventual quarter-finalist Matteo Berrettini in the second round in straights.

Moving into the grass season, despite losing in the first round in singles at the Libéma Open, he teamed up with Zizou Bergs to reach the doubles final in the event, losing out to Sander Arends & David Pel in the final.

== Personal life ==
Rinderknech's mother, Virginie, is a former professional tennis player on Women's Tour. He has three sisters, Mathilde, Julie and Flore.

His family is deeply involved in tennis. Chloé Paquet and Monégasque tennis players Benjamin Balleret and Valentin Vacherot are his cousins.

Rinderknech played college tennis at Texas A&M University. He is married to a former collegiate player he met there, Hortense Boscher.

Rinderknech is a fan of French football club AS Saint-Étienne.

== Performance timelines ==
Key
W	F	SF	QF	#R	RR	Q#	P#	DNQ	A	Z#	PO	G	S	B	NMS	NTI	P	NH

(W) winner; (F) finalist; (SF) semifinalist; (QF) quarterfinalist; (#R) rounds 4, 3, 2, 1; (RR) round-robin stage; (Q#) qualification round; (P#) preliminary round; (DNQ) did not qualify; (A) absent; (Z#) Davis/Fed Cup Zonal Group (with number indication) or (PO) play-off; (G) gold, (S) silver or (B) bronze Olympic/Paralympic medal; (NMS) not a Masters tournament; (NTI) not a Tier I tournament; (P) postponed; (NH) not held; (SR) strike rate (events won / competed); (W–L) win–loss record.
To avoid confusion and double counting, these charts are updated at the conclusion of a tournament or when the player's participation has ended.

=== Singles ===
Tournament	2020	2021	2022	2023	2024	2025	2026	SR	W–L	Win %
Grand Slam tournaments
Australian Open	A	Q3	2R (Note: Arthur Rinderknech withdrew in the second round, which does not count as a loss.)	1R	1R	1R	1R	0 / 5	1–4	20%
French Open	1R	1R	1R	2R	2R	1R	2R	0 / 7	3–7	30%
Wimbledon	NH	1R	1R	1R	2R	3R	3R	0 / 6	5–6	45%
US Open	A	2R	2R	3R	2R	4R	3R	0 / 6	10–6	63%
Win–loss	0–1	1–3	2–3	3–4	3–4	5–4	5–4	0 / 24	19–23	45%
ATP Masters 1000
Indian Wells Open	NH	A	1R	1R	A	1R	3R (Note: Arthur Rinderknech received a walkover in the second round, which does not count as a win.)	0 / 4	0–4	0%
Miami Open	NH	A	2R	1R	Q2	1R	2R	0 / 4	1–4	20%
Monte-Carlo Masters	NH	A	1R	A	Q2	Q2	2R	0 / 2	1–2	33%
Madrid Open	NH	A	A	A	1R	2R	3R	0 / 3	2–3	40%
Italian Open	A	A	A	2R	1R	1R	A	0 / 3	1–3	25%
Canadian Open	NH	A	1R	A	3R	1R	4R	0 / 4	4–4	50%
Cincinnati Open	A	A	A	A	A	3R	2R	0 / 2	2–2	50%
Shanghai Masters	NH			1R	2R	F	A	0 / 3	7–3	70%
Paris Masters	Q1	1R	1R	Q1	3R	2R	3R	0 / 5	5–5	50%
Win–loss	0–0	0–1	1–5	1–4	5–5	10–8	6–7	0 / 30	23–30	43%
Career statistics
Tournaments	1	16	19	22	22	27	10	117		
Titles	0	0	0	0	0	0	0	0		
Finals	0	0	1	0	0	1	0	2		
Overall win–loss	0–1	18–17	22–19	13–22	21–22	27–27	8–10	109–120		
Year-end ranking	178	58	44	96	59	29		48%		

=== Doubles ===
Current through the 2026 Indian Wells Open.

Tournament	2018	2019	2020	2021	2022	2023	2024	2025	SR	W–L	Win %
Grand Slam tournaments
Australian Open	A	A	A	A	A	QF	A	1R	0 / 2	3–2	60%
French Open	1R	1R	2R	A	2R	1R	A	3R	0 / 6	4–6	40%
Wimbledon	A	A	NH	A	1R	1R	1R	A	0 / 3	0–3	0%
US Open	A	A	A	2R	1R	2R	1R	A	0 / 4	2–4	33%
Win–loss	0–1	0–1	1–1	1–1	1–3	4–4	0–2	2–2	0 / 15	9–15	38%
Career statistics
Tournaments	1	1	1	5	1				9		
Titles	0	0	0	0	0				0		
Finals	0	0	0	1	0				1		
Overall win–loss	0–1	0–1	1–1	9–5	3–8				13–16		
Year-end ranking	711	390	165	131	358				45%		

== ATP Masters 1000 finals ==
=== Singles: 1 (runner-up) ===
Result	Year	Tournament	Surface	Opponent	Score
Loss	2025	Shanghai Masters	Hard	(Monaco) Valentin Vacherot	6–4, 3–6, 3–6

=== Doubles: 1 (runner-up) ===
Result	Year	Tournament	Surface	Partner	Opponents	Score
Loss	2026	Indian Wells Open	Hard	(Monaco) Valentin Vacherot	(Argentina) Guido Andreozzi (France) Manuel Guinard	6–7^{(3–7)}, 3–6

== ATP Tour finals ==
=== Singles: 2 (2 runner-ups) ===
Legend Grand Slam (–) ATP 1000 (0–1) ATP 500 (–) ATP 250 (0–1)	Finals by surface Hard (0–2) Clay (–) Grass (–)	Finals by setting Outdoor (0–2) Indoor (–)

Result	W–L	Date	Tournament	Tier	Surface	Opponent	Score
Loss	0–1	Jan 2022	Adelaide International II, Australia	ATP 250	Hard	(Australia) Thanasi Kokkinakis	7–6^{(8–6)}, 6–7^{(5–7)}, 3–6
Loss	0–2	Oct 2025	Shanghai Masters, China	ATP 1000	Hard	(Monaco) Valentin Vacherot	6–4, 3–6, 3–6

=== Doubles: 3 (3 runner-ups) ===
Legend Grand Slam (–) ATP 1000 (0–1) ATP 500 (–) ATP 250 (0–2)	Finals by surface Hard (0–2) Clay (–) Grass (0–1)	Finals by setting Outdoor (0–2) Indoor (0–1)

Result	W–L	Date	Tournament	Tier	Surface	Partner	Opponents	Score
Loss	0–1	Sep 2021	Moselle Open, France	ATP 250	Hard (i)	(Monaco) Hugo Nys	(Poland) Hubert Hurkacz (Poland) Jan Zieliński	5–7, 3–6
Loss	0–2	Mar 2026	Indian Wells Open, US	ATP 1000	Hard	(Monaco) Valentin Vacherot	(Argentina) Guido Andreozzi (France) Manuel Guinard	6–7^{(3–7)}, 3–6
Loss	0–3	Jun 2026	Libéma Open, Netherlands	ATP 250	Grass	(Belgium) Zizou Bergs	(Netherlands) Sander Arends (Netherlands) David Pel	6–7^{(6–8)}, 6–7^{(5–7)}

== ATP Challenger Tour finals ==
=== Singles: 8 (6 titles, 2 runner-ups) ===
Legend ATP Challenger Tour (6–2)	Finals by surface Hard (4–2) Clay (2–0)

Result	W–L	Date	Tournament	Tier	Surface	Opponent	Score
Win	1–0	Jan 2020	Open de Rennes, France	Challenger	Hard (i)	(United Kingdom) James Ward	7–5, 6–4
Loss	1–1	Feb 2020	Challenger de Drummondville, Canada	Challenger	Hard (i)	(United States) Maxime Cressy	7–6^{(7–4)}, 4–6, 4–6
Win	2–1	Mar 2020	Calgary Challenger, Canada	Challenger	Hard (i)	(United States) Maxime Cressy	3–6, 7–6^{(7–5)}, 6–4
Win	3–1	Jan 2021	Istanbul Challenger, Turkey	Challenger	Hard (i)	(France) Benjamin Bonzi	4–6, 7–6^{(7–1)}, 7–6^{(7–3)}
Win	4–1	Jun 2022	Poznań Open, Poland	Challenger	Clay	(Chile) Tomás Barrios Vera	6–3, 7–6^{(7–2)}
Loss	4–2	Aug 2022	Vancouver Open, Canada	Challenger	Hard	(France) Constant Lestienne	0–6, 6–4, 3–6
Win	5–2	Jul 2023	Zug Open, Switzerland	Challenger	Clay	(Belgium) Joris De Loore	3–6, 6–3, 6–4
Win	6–2	Feb 2024	Play In Challenger, France	Challenger	Hard (i)	(Belgium) Joris De Loore	6–4, 3–6, 7–6^{(10–8)}

=== Doubles: 4 (3 titles, 1 runner-up) ===
Legend ATP Challenger Tour (3–1)	Finals by surface Hard (2–0) Clay (1–1)

Result	W–L	Date	Tournament	Tier	Surface	Partner	Opponents	Score
Loss	0–1	May 2019	Savannah Challenger, US	Challenger	Clay (green)	(France) Manuel Guinard	(Venezuela) Roberto Maytín (Brazil) Fernando Romboli	7–6^{(7–5)}, 4–6, [9–11]
Win	1–1	Feb 2020	Challenger de Drummondville, Canada	Challenger	Hard (i)	(France) Manuel Guinard	(Dominican Republic) Roberto Cid Subervi (Portugal) Gonçalo Oliveira	7–6^{(7–4)}, 7–6^{(7–3)}
Win	2–1	Aug 2020	Prague Open, Czech Republic	Challenger	Clay	(France) Pierre-Hugues Herbert	(Czech Republic) Zdeněk Kolář (Czech Republic) Lukáš Rosol	6–3, 6–4
Win	3–1	Jan 2024	Open Quimper, France	Challenger	Hard (i)	(France) Manuel Guinard	(India) Anirudh Chandrasekar (India) Vijay Sundar Prashanth	7–6^{(7–4)}, 6–3

== ITF Tour finals ==
=== Singles: 10 (5 titles, 5 runner-ups) ===
Legend ITF Futures/WTT (5–5)	Finals by surface Hard (2–4) Clay (3–1)

Result	W–L	Date	Tournament	Tier	Surface	Opponent	Score
Loss	0–1	Jun 2016	Belgium F1, Binche	Futures	Clay	(Belgium) Niels Desein	2–6, 7–6^{(7–3)}, 1–6
Win	1–1	Jul 2018	Morocco F2, Meknes	Futures	Clay	(Morocco) Lamine Ouahab	4–6, 7–5, 6–3
Win	2–1	Aug 2018	Serbia F2, Novi Sad	Futures	Clay	(Turkey) Ergi Kırkın	6–2, 6–4
Loss	2–2	Oct 2018	Nigeria F4, Lagos	Futures	Hard	(France) Tom Jomby	3–6, 6–3, 3–6
Win	3–2	Feb 2019	M15 Monastir, Tunisia	WTT	Hard	(Czech Republic) Petr Nouza	6–4, 6–4
Win	4–2	Mar 2019	M15 Tabarka, Tunisia	WTT	Clay	(Spain) Pol Toledo Bagué	6–4, 6–2
Loss	4–3	Jun 2019	M25 Palma del Río, Spain	WTT	Hard	(Spain) Andrés Artuñedo	7–6^{(7–2)}, 1–6, 4–6
Loss	4–4	Sep 2019	M25+H Mulhouse, France	WTT	Hard (i)	(France) Dan Added	6–7^{(4–7)}, 6–2, 3–6
Loss	4–5	Dec 2019	M15 Monastir, Tunisia	WTT	Hard	(France) Calvin Hemery	6–7^{(4–7)}, 4.6
Win	5–5	Dec 2019	M15 Monastir, Tunisia	WTT	Hard	(France) Thomas Laurent	6–3, 4–6, 6–3

=== Doubles: 4 (2 titles, 2 runner-ups) ===
Legend ITF Futures/WTT (2–2)	Finals by surface Hard (1–1) Clay (1–1)

Result	W–L	Date	Tournament	Tier	Surface	Partner	Opponents	Score
Loss	0–1	Jun 2017	Tunisia F23, Hammamet	Futures	Clay	(France) Florian Lakat	(Austria) Lucas Miedler (Austria) Maximilian Neuchrist	6–7^{(2–7)}, 7–5, [12–14]
Win	1–1	Jul 2017	Belgium F2, Arlon	Futures	Clay	(France) Florian Lakat	(France) Geoffrey Blancaneaux (France) Constant de la Bassetière	6–1, 4–6, [10–4]
Loss	1–2	Oct 2018	Nigeria F4, Lagos	Futures	Hard	(United States) William Bushamuka	(Ukraine) Danylo Kalenichenko (Brazil) Diego Matos	6–2, 5–7, [7–10]
Win	2–2	Feb 2019	M15 Monastir, Tunisia	WTT	Hard	(France) Geoffrey Blancaneaux	(Czech Republic) Petr Nouza (Czech Republic) Marek Gengel	6–1, 6–4

== Wins against Top 10 players ==
- Rinderknech has a 3–18 (14.29%) record against players who were, at the time the match was played, ranked in the top 10.

Season	2025	Total
Wins	3	3

#	Player	Rk	Event	Surface	Rd	Score	Rk	Ref
2025
1.	(United States) Ben Shelton	10	Queen's Club, UK	Grass	1R	7–6^{(7–5)}, 7–6^{(7–4)}	80	
2.	(Germany) Alexander Zverev	3	Wimbledon, UK	Grass	1R	7–6^{(7–3)}, 6–7^{(8–10)}, 6–3, 6–7^{(5–7)}, 6–4	72	
3.	(Germany) Alexander Zverev	3	Shanghai Masters, China	Hard	3R	4–6, 6–3, 6–2	54	

- Key: (Rk) first use, opponent rank; (Rd) round; (Rk) 2nd use, player rank; (Ref) reference; (F) final; (SF) semifinal; (QF) quarterfinal; (#R) rounds 4, 3, 2, 1; (RR) round-robin stage; (Q#) qualifying rounds or stages (3), 2, 1.
