= 2012 American Express – TED Open – Singles =

TED Open – Singles
- 2012 American Express – TED Open

Final
- Champion: (Russia) Dmitry Tursunov
- Runner-up: (France) Adrian Mannarino
- Score: 6–4, 7–6^{(7–5)}

Events
Singles	Doubles
← 2011 ·	American Express – TED Open	· 2013 →

Denis Istomin was the defending champion but decided not to participate.
Dmitry Tursunov won the title, defeating Adrian Mannarino 6–4, 7–6^{(7–5)} in the final.

== Seeds ==
1. (Tunisia) Malek Jaziri (quarterfinals)
2. (United States) Rajeev Ram (first round)
3. (Slovenia) Grega Žemlja (semifinals)
4. (United States) Michael Russell (semifinals)
5. (Germany) Matthias Bachinger (first round)
6. (Russia) Igor Kunitsyn (second round)
7. (Slovakia) Karol Beck (quarterfinals)
8. (Russia) Dmitry Tursunov (champion)

== Draw ==
=== Key ===
- Q = Qualifier
- WC = Wild card
- LL = Lucky loser
- Alt = Alternate
- SE = Special exempt
- PR = Protected ranking
- ITF = ITF entry
- JE = Junior exempt
- w/o = Walkover
- r = Retired
- d = Defaulted
- SR = Special ranking

=== Finals ===
Semifinals
8	(Russia) Dmitry Tursunov	7	6
4	(United States) Michael Russell	5	4
3	(Slovenia) Grega Žemlja	6^{5}	4
(France) Adrian Mannarino	7^{7}	6

Final
8	(Russia) Dmitry Tursunov	6	7^{7}
(France) Adrian Mannarino	4	6^{5}

=== Top half ===
First round
1	(Tunisia) M Jaziri	1	7^{7}	6
(United Kingdom) J Baker	6	6^{2}	4
(Moldova) R Albot	6	6
(Canada) É Chvojka	2	2
Q	(Germany) M Abel	4	5
(Moldova) R Borvanov	6	7
(Bosnia and Herzegovina) M Bašić	1	6^{6}
8	(Russia) D Tursunov	6	7^{8}
4	(United States) M Russell	6	3	6
Q	(Republic of Ireland) J McGee	3	6	3
(France) G Sakharov	6	6
WC	(Turkey) Efe Yurtacan	4	3
WC	(Turkey) H Akkoyun	4	6	3
(United States) D Zivkovic	6	3	6
(France) M Teixeira	4	6	6
5	(Germany) M Bachinger	6	4	4

Second round
1	(Tunisia) M Jaziri	6	6
(Moldova) R Albot	2	4
(Moldova) R Borvanov	2	4
8	(Russia) D Tursunov	6	6
4	(United States) M Russell	6	6
(France) G Sakharov	2	3
(United States) D Zivkovic	4	4
(France) M Teixeira	6	6

Quarterfinals
1	(Tunisia) M Jaziri	3	6	2
8	(Russia) D Tursunov	6	3	6
4	(United States) M Russell	2	7^{8}	6
(France) M Teixeira	6	6^{6}	4

Semifinals
8	(Russia) D Tursunov	7	6
4	(United States) M Russell	5	4

=== Bottom half ===
First round
7	(Slovakia) K Beck	6	6
Q	(United Kingdom) L Burton	4	2
Q	(Italy) R Ghedin	7^{10}	6
(Turkey) M İlhan	6^{8}	4
(United States) A Kuznetsov	6	6
WC	(Turkey) D Durmus	1	4
(Russia) K Kravchuk	6^{1}	3
3	(Slovenia) G Žemlja	7^{7}	6
6	(Russia) I Kunitsyn	6	7
(Germany) M Zverev	3	5
(France) A Mannarino	6	6
(Italy) L Vanni	4	2
WC	(Turkey) B Erguden	5	1
(Australia) B Klein	7	6
(Spain) A Menéndez	6	6
2	(United States) R Ram	4	3

Second round
7	(Slovakia) K Beck	6	6
Q	(Italy) R Ghedin	2	1
(United States) A Kuznetsov	4	6	3
3	(Slovenia) G Žemlja	6	3	6
6	(Russia) I Kunitsyn	0	6	2
(France) A Mannarino	6	4	6
(Australia) B Klein	4	7^{7}	3
(Spain) A Menéndez	6	6^{3}	6

Quarterfinals
7	(Slovakia) K Beck	5	3
3	(Slovenia) G Žemlja	7	6
(France) A Mannarino	7^{7}	4	7^{7}
(Spain) A Menéndez	6^{3}	6	6^{3}

Semifinals
3	(Slovenia) G Žemlja	6^{5}	4
(France) A Mannarino	7^{7}	6
