= 2013 American Express – TED Open – Doubles =

TED Open – Doubles
- 2013 American Express – TED Open

Final
- Champions: (United Kingdom) Jamie Delgado (Australia) Jordan Kerr
- Runners-up: (Republic of Ireland) James Cluskey (Spain) Adrián Menéndez-Maceiras
- Score: 6–3, 6–2

Events
Singles	Doubles
← 2012 ·	American Express – TED Open	· 2014 →

The defending champions were Karol Beck and Lukáš Dlouhý decided not to participate.
Jamie Delgado and Jordan Kerr won the title, defeating James Cluskey and Adrián Menéndez-Maceiras 6–3, 6–2 in the final.

== Seeds ==
1. (United States) James Cerretani / (Sweden) Andreas Siljeström (first round)
2. (United Kingdom) Jamie Delgado / (Australia) Jordan Kerr (champions)
3. (United States) Austin Krajicek / (United States) Tennys Sandgren (quarterfinals)
4. (United Kingdom) Brydan Klein / (Australia) Dane Propoggia (semifinals)

== Draw ==
=== Key ===
- Q = Qualifier
- WC = Wild card
- LL = Lucky loser
- Alt = Alternate
- SE = Special exempt
- PR = Protected ranking
- ITF = ITF entry
- JE = Junior exempt
- w/o = Walkover
- r = Retired
- d = Defaulted
- SR = Special ranking

=== Draw ===
First round
1	(United States) J Cerretani (Sweden) A Siljeström	6	4	[8]
(Belarus) U Ignatik (Ukraine) I Marchenko	1	6	[10]
WC	(Turkey) T Altuna (Turkey) B Erguden	5	4
(Austria) M Fischer (Germany) P Petzschner	7	6
3	(United States) A Krajicek (United States) T Sandgren	6	6
WC	(Turkey) Gokberk Ergeneman (Turkey) A Yüksel	2	0
(Republic of Ireland) J McGee (China) D Wu	6	3	[7]
(Republic of Ireland) J Cluskey (Spain) A Menéndez-Maceiras	1	6	[10]
(Bosnia and Herzegovina) M Bašić (Bosnia and Herzegovina) A Šetkić	4	5
(Spain) G García-López (Spain) D Muñoz de la Nava	6	7
(United Kingdom) D Rice (United Kingdom) S Thornley	4	3
4	(United Kingdom) B Klein (Australia) D Propoggia	6	6
(Georgia (country)) N Basilashvili (Germany) P Gojowczyk	6	3	[8]
(Italy) F Cipolla (Kazakhstan) M Kukushkin	1	6	[10]
WC	(Egypt) S Sabry (Egypt) M Safwat	4	1
2	(United Kingdom) J Delgado (Australia) J Kerr	6	6

Quarterfinals
(Belarus) U Ignatik (Ukraine) I Marchenko	3	6	[3]
(Austria) M Fischer (Germany) P Petzschner	6	3	[10]
3	(United States) A Krajicek (United States) T Sandgren	3	7^{7}	[4]
(Republic of Ireland) J Cluskey (Spain) A Menéndez-Maceiras	6	6^{4}	[10]
(Spain) G García-López (Spain) D Muñoz de la Nava	7^{7}	6^{3}	[9]
4	(United Kingdom) B Klein (Australia) D Propoggia	6^{5}	7^{7}	[11]
(Italy) F Cipolla (Kazakhstan) M Kukushkin	6^{5}	7^{7}	[7]
2	(United Kingdom) J Delgado (Australia) J Kerr	7^{7}	6^{4}	[10]

Semifinals
(Austria) M Fischer (Germany) P Petzschner	3	6	[7]
(Republic of Ireland) J Cluskey (Spain) A Menéndez-Maceiras	6	2	[10]
4	(United Kingdom) B Klein (Australia) D Propoggia	1	6^{6}
2	(United Kingdom) J Delgado (Australia) J Kerr	6	7^{8}

Final
(Republic of Ireland) J Cluskey (Spain) A Menéndez-Maceiras	3	2
2	(United Kingdom) J Delgado (Australia) J Kerr	6	6
