= 2011 American Express – TED Open – Doubles =

TED Open – Doubles
- 2011 American Express – TED Open

Final
- Champions: (Australia) Carsten Ball (Germany) Andre Begemann
- Runners-up: (France) Grégoire Burquier (Belgium) Yannick Mertens
- Score: 6–2, 6–4

Events
Singles	Doubles
← 2010 ·	American Express – TED Open	· 2012 →

Leoš Friedl and Dušan Vemić were the defending champions, but decided not to participate.

Carsten Ball and Andre Begemann won the title, defeating Grégoire Burquier and Yannick Mertens 6–2, 6–4 in the final.

== Seeds ==
1. (United States) James Cerretani / (Germany) Philipp Marx (first round)
2. (Australia) Jordan Kerr / (United States) Travis Parrott (quarterfinals)
3. (Russia) Teymuraz Gabashvili / (Kazakhstan) Mikhail Kukushkin (quarterfinals)
4. (Australia) Carsten Ball / (Germany) Andre Begemann (champions)

== Draw ==
=== Key ===
- Q = Qualifier
- WC = Wild card
- LL = Lucky loser
- Alt = Alternate
- SE = Special exempt
- PR = Protected ranking
- ITF = ITF entry
- JE = Junior exempt
- w/o = Walkover
- r = Retired
- d = Defaulted
- SR = Special ranking

=== Draw ===
First round
1	(United States) J Cerretani (Germany) P Marx	6	4	[10]
(Spain) A Brugués-Davi (Tunisia) M Jaziri	1	6	[12]
(Republic of Ireland) J McGee (Egypt) M Safwat	6	6
WC	(Turkey) Gökberk Ergeneman (Turkey) Efe Yurtacan	3	1
3	(Russia) T Gabashvili (Kazakhstan) M Kukushkin	6	6
(Romania) T-D Crăciun (Russia) M Ledovskikh	4	3
WC	(Turkey) H Akkoyun (Romania) A Cruciat	1	3
(France) G Burquier (Belgium) Y Mertens	6	6
(Lithuania) R Berankis (Czech Republic) I Minář	6	3	[4]
(Brazil) A Ghem (Bulgaria) D Kutrovsky	4	6	[10]
(United States) T Rettenmaier (Germany) S Stadler	6	5	[4]
4	(Australia) C Ball (Germany) A Begemann	4	7	[10]
WC	(Turkey) Barkın Yalcınkale (Turkey) Anıl Yüksel	6^{2}	1
(Uzbekistan) D Istomin (Russia) K Kravchuk	7^{7}	6
(Belarus) U Ignatik (Russia) D Matsukevich	1	3
2	(Australia) J Kerr (United States) T Parrott	6	6

Quarterfinals
(Spain) A Brugués-Davi (Tunisia) M Jaziri	7^{7}	6
(Republic of Ireland) J McGee (Egypt) M Safwat	6^{4}	2
3	(Russia) T Gabashvili (Kazakhstan) M Kukushkin	6	2	[7]
(France) G Burquier (Belgium) Y Mertens	0	6	[10]
(Brazil) A Ghem (Bulgaria) D Kutrovsky	4	6^{2}
4	(Australia) C Ball (Germany) A Begemann	6	7^{7}
(Uzbekistan) D Istomin (Russia) K Kravchuk	6	6
2	(Australia) J Kerr (United States) T Parrott	4	3

Semifinals
(Spain) A Brugués-Davi (Tunisia) M Jaziri	2	4
(France) G Burquier (Belgium) Y Mertens	6	6
4	(Australia) C Ball (Germany) A Begemann	7^{7}	6^{3}	[10]
(Uzbekistan) D Istomin (Russia) K Kravchuk	6^{4}	7^{7}	[5]

Final
(France) G Burquier (Belgium) Y Mertens	2	4
4	(Australia) C Ball (Germany) A Begemann	6	6
