= 2013 American Express – TED Open – Singles =

TED Open – Singles
- 2013 American Express – TED Open

Final
- Champion: (Kazakhstan) Mikhail Kukushkin
- Runner-up: (Ukraine) Illya Marchenko
- Score: 6–3, 6–3

Events
Singles	Doubles
← 2012 ·	American Express – TED Open	· 2014 →

Dmitry Tursunov was the defending champion but decided not to participate. Mikhail Kukushkin won the title, defeating Illya Marchenko 6–3, 6–3 in the final.

== Seeds ==
1. (Spain) Guillermo García López (semifinals)
2. (India) Somdev Devvarman (first round)
3. (Italy) Matteo Viola (second round)
4. (Ukraine) Illya Marchenko (final)
5. (Germany) Peter Gojowczyk (second round)
6. (Italy) Flavio Cipolla (quarterfinals)
7. (Spain) Daniel Muñoz de la Nava (first round)
8. (Germany) Philipp Petzschner (second round)

== Draw ==
=== Key ===
- Q = Qualifier
- WC = Wild card
- LL = Lucky loser
- Alt = Alternate
- SE = Special exempt
- PR = Protected ranking
- ITF = ITF entry
- JE = Junior exempt
- w/o = Walkover
- r = Retired
- d = Defaulted
- SR = Special ranking

=== Finals ===
Semifinals
1	(Spain) Guillermo García López	5	3
(Kazakhstan) Mikhail Kukushkin	7	6
4	(Ukraine) Illya Marchenko	6	6
(Australia) John-Patrick Smith	4	1

Final
(Kazakhstan) Mikhail Kukushkin	6	6
4	(Ukraine) Illya Marchenko	3	3

=== Top half ===
First round
1	(Spain) G García López	6	6
(Turkey) B Ergüden	0	2
(Tunisia) M Jaziri	6	7^{7}
Q	(United Kingdom) D Rice	2	6^{3}
(Belarus) D Zhyrmont	4	7^{7}	6
(Egypt) M Safwat	6	6^{4}	1
(Belarus) U Ignatik	6	4	3
6	(Italy) F Cipolla	4	6	6
3	(Italy) M Viola	6	6
WC	(Turkey) T Altuna	1	2
(Turkey) M İlhan	6^{4}	4
(Bosnia and Herzegovina) A Šetkić	7^{7}	6
(Kazakhstan) M Kukushkin	3	7	7^{7}
(Republic of Ireland) J McGee	6	5	6^{5}
Alt	(Georgia (country)) N Basilashvili	3	6	1
8	(Germany) P Petzschner	6	2	6

Second round
1	(Spain) G García López	6	6
(Tunisia) M Jaziri	0	3
(Belarus) D Zhyrmont	2	3
6	(Italy) F Cipolla	6	6
3	(Italy) M Viola	2	2
(Bosnia and Herzegovina) A Šetkić	6	6
(Kazakhstan) M Kukushkin	6	6
8	(Germany) P Petzschner	1	4

Quarterfinals
1	(Spain) G García López	6	6
6	(Italy) F Cipolla	2	3
(Bosnia and Herzegovina) A Šetkić	2	2
(Kazakhstan) M Kukushkin	6	6

Semifinals
1	(Spain) G García López	5	3
(Kazakhstan) M Kukushkin	7	6

=== Bottom half ===
First round
5/WC	(Germany) P Gojowczyk	6	6
Q	(United Kingdom) J Milton	4	1
(Spain) A Menéndez Maceiras	6^{3}	3
(Austria) M Fischer	7^{7}	6
(United States) T Sandgren	3	4
Q	(Belarus) E Gerasimov	6	6
(China) D Wu	6	3	4
4	(Ukraine) I Marchenko	3	6	6
7	(Spain) D Muñoz de la Nava	3	4
(Australia) J-P Smith	6	6
WC	(Turkey) A Yüksel	6^{1}	1
(Bosnia and Herzegovina) M Bašić	7^{7}	6
Q	(Russia) D Matsukevich	1	1
(United States) A Krajicek	6	6
(Russia) K Kravchuk	6	6
2	(India) S Devvarman	2	3

Second round
5/WC	(Germany) P Gojowczyk	3	4
(Austria) M Fischer	6	6
Q	(Belarus) E Gerasimov	2	4
4	(Ukraine) I Marchenko	6	6
(Australia) J-P Smith	6	4	6
(Bosnia and Herzegovina) M Bašić	3	6	2
(United States) A Krajicek	3	3
(Russia) K Kravchuk	6	6

Quarterfinals
(Austria) M Fischer	6^{6}	3
4	(Ukraine) I Marchenko	7^{7}	6
(Australia) J-P Smith	4	6	6
(Russia) K Kravchuk	6	4	1

Semifinals
4	(Ukraine) I Marchenko	6	6
(Australia) J-P Smith	4	1
