= 2014 Amex-Istanbul Challenger – Singles =

Singles
- 2014 Amex-Istanbul Challenger

Final
- Champion: (France) Adrian Mannarino
- Runner-up: (Japan) Tatsuma Ito
- Score: 6–0, 2–0, ret.

Events
Singles	Doubles
← 2013 ·	Amex-Istanbul Challenger	· 2015 →

Mikhail Kukushkin was the current champion, but chose not to compete this year.

Adrian Mannarino won the title when Tatsuma Ito retired in the final.

== Seeds ==
1. (Germany) Tobias Kamke (quarterfinals)
2. (Tunisia) Malek Jaziri (first round)
3. (France) Adrian Mannarino (champion)
4. (Japan) Tatsuma Ito (final, retired)
5. (Japan) Yūichi Sugita (first round)
6. (United Kingdom) James Ward (semifinals)
7. (Chinese Taipei) Jimmy Wang (quarterfinals)
8. (Turkey) Marsel İlhan (quarterfinals)

== Draw ==
=== Key ===
- Q = Qualifier
- WC = Wild card
- LL = Lucky loser
- Alt = Alternate
- SE = Special exempt
- PR = Protected ranking
- ITF = ITF entry
- JE = Junior exempt
- w/o = Walkover
- r = Retired
- d = Defaulted
- SR = Special ranking

=== Finals ===
Semifinals
6	(United Kingdom) James Ward	3	1
3	(France) Adrian Mannarino	6	6
4	(Japan) Tatsuma Ito	3	6	6
(Germany) Philipp Petzschner	6	1	3

Final
3	(France) Adrian Mannarino	6	2
4	(Japan) Tatsuma Ito	0	0^{r}

=== Top half ===
First round
1	(Germany) T Kamke	3
(France) V Millot	0^{r}
(Japan) H Moriya	6	6
(Serbia) M Janković	2	4
WC	(Turkey) Barkin Yalcinkale	3	7	3
WC	(Turkey) A Yüksel	6	5	6
(Belarus) E Gerasimov	4	4
6	(United Kingdom) J Ward	6	6
3	(France) A Mannarino	6	6
Q	(Georgia (country)) A Metreveli	4	1
Q	(Bulgaria) D Kuzmanov	6	6^{3}	4
(Belarus) Y Shyla	1	7^{7}	6
(Republic of Ireland) L Sorensen	6	6
Q	(Colombia) JS Gómez	1	1
(New Zealand) M Daniell	7	6
5	(Japan) Y Sugita	5	3

Second round
1	(Germany) T Kamke	6	6
(Japan) H Moriya	3	4
WC	(Turkey) A Yüksel	1	0
6	(United Kingdom) J Ward	6	6
3	(France) A Mannarino	6	6
(Belarus) Y Shyla	1	4
(Republic of Ireland) L Sorensen	6	6
(New Zealand) M Daniell	4	3

Quarterfinals
1	(Germany) T Kamke	3	6	6^{8}
6	(United Kingdom) J Ward	6	4	7^{10}
3	(France) A Mannarino	7	6
(Republic of Ireland) L Sorensen	5	3

Semifinals
6	(United Kingdom) J Ward	3	1
3	(France) A Mannarino	6	6

=== Bottom half ===
First round
7	(Chinese Taipei) J Wang	6	7^{7}
WC	(Turkey) C İlkel	3	6^{4}
(France) C Lestienne	4	4
(Germany) A Zverev	6	6
Q	(France) Y Jankovits	3	3
(Japan) Yu Watanuki	6	6
(Russia) V Baluda	3	6	0^{r}
4	(Japan) T Ito	6	1	4
8	(Turkey) M İlhan	7^{7}	6
(Japan) Y Uchiyama	6^{4}	3
(Russia) A Kudryavtsev	1	4
(Japan) Y Nishioka	6	6
WC	(Turkey) B Ergüden	3	2
(Germany) P Petzschner	6	6
(France) F Martin	6	6
2	(Tunisia) M Jaziri	4	2

Second round
7	(Chinese Taipei) J Wang	6	4	6
(Germany) A Zverev	4	6	3
(Japan) Yu Watanuki	3	4
4	(Japan) T Ito	6	6
8	(Turkey) M İlhan	7	6
(Japan) Y Nishioka	5	1
(Germany) P Petzschner	7	6
(France) F Martin	5	4

Quarterfinals
7	(Chinese Taipei) J Wang	6	1	6^{3}
4	(Japan) T Ito	3	6	7^{7}
8	(Turkey) M İlhan	6	0	4
(Germany) P Petzschner	3	6	6

Semifinals
4	(Japan) T Ito	3	6	6
(Germany) P Petzschner	6	1	3
