= 2011 American Express – TED Open – Singles =

TED Open – Singles
- 2011 American Express – TED Open

Final
- Champion: (Uzbekistan) Denis Istomin
- Runner-up: (Germany) Philipp Kohlschreiber
- Score: 7–6^{(8–6)}, 6–4

Events
Singles	Doubles
← 2010 ·	American Express – TED Open	· 2012 →

Adrian Mannarino was the defending champion but decided not to participate.

Denis Istomin won his third Challenger title in this year. He defeated Philipp Kohlschreiber 7–6^{(8–6)}, 6–4 in the final.

== Seeds ==
1. (Germany) Philipp Kohlschreiber (final)
2. (Kazakhstan) Mikhail Kukushkin (quarterfinals)
3. (Germany) Matthias Bachinger (first round)
4. (Germany) Tobias Kamke (first round)
5. (Uzbekistan) Denis Istomin (champion)
6. (Turkey) Marsel İlhan (first round)
7. (France) Édouard Roger-Vasselin (second round)
8. (Russia) Teymuraz Gabashvili (first round)

== Draw ==
=== Key ===
- Q = Qualifier
- WC = Wild card
- LL = Lucky loser
- Alt = Alternate
- SE = Special exempt
- PR = Protected ranking
- ITF = ITF entry
- JE = Junior exempt
- w/o = Walkover
- r = Retired
- d = Defaulted
- SR = Special ranking

=== Finals ===
Semifinals
1/WC	(Germany) Philipp Kohlschreiber	6	6
(Tunisia) Malek Jaziri	3	2
(Lithuania) Ričardas Berankis	6^{3}	6^{3}
5	(Uzbekistan) Denis Istomin	7^{7}	7^{7}

Final
1/WC	(Germany) Philipp Kohlschreiber	6^{6}	4
5	(Uzbekistan) Denis Istomin	7^{8}	6

=== Top half ===
First round
1/WC	(Germany) P Kohlschreiber	6	6
Q	(Germany) S Stadler	4	4
WC	(Turkey) Efe Yurtacan	1	5
(France) G Burquier	6	7
Q	(Bulgaria) D Kutrovsky	6	4	5
(France) K de Schepper	3	6	7
(Spain) A Brugués Davi	6	6
8	(Russia) T Gabashvili	3	4
4	(Germany) T Kamke	4	5
(Russia) K Kravchuk	6	7
(Germany) A Begemann	2	4
(Tunisia) M Jaziri	6	6
(Brazil) A Ghem	6	6
Q	(Romania) T-D Crăciun	2	1
LL	(Russia) M Ledovskikh	6	3	6
6	(Turkey) M İlhan	1	6	3

Second round
1/WC	(Germany) P Kohlschreiber	7	6
(France) G Burquier	5	2
(France) K de Schepper	6^{4}	6^{7}
(Spain) A Brugués Davi	7^{7}	7^{9}
(Russia) K Kravchuk	3	0
(Tunisia) M Jaziri	6	6
(Brazil) A Ghem	4	6	6^{2}
LL	(Russia) M Ledovskikh	6	4	7^{7}

Quarterfinals
1/WC	(Germany) P Kohlschreiber	6	6
(Spain) A Brugués Davi	2	2
(Tunisia) M Jaziri	6	7
LL	(Russia) M Ledovskikh	4	5

Semifinals
1/WC	(Germany) P Kohlschreiber	6	6
(Tunisia) M Jaziri	3	2

=== Bottom half ===
First round
7	(France) É Roger-Vasselin	7	6
PR	(Czech Republic) J Minář	5	2
Q	(Republic of Ireland) J McGee	7	6
(Australia) C Ball	5	4
(Netherlands) I Sijsling	4	6	4
(Russia) D Matsukevich	6	3	0^{r}
(Lithuania) R Berankis	6	6
3	(Germany) M Bachinger	4	4
5	(Uzbekistan) D Istomin	6	6
(Belarus) U Ignatik	4	4
WC	(Turkey) H Akkoyun	1	2
(Belgium) Y Mertens	6	6
Alt	(Russia) E Kirillov	2	1
(Belgium) D Goffin	6	6
WC	(Slovakia) F Horanský	2	1
2	(Kazakhstan) M Kukushkin	6	6

Second round
7	(France) É Roger-Vasselin	1	4
Q	(Republic of Ireland) J McGee	6	6
(Netherlands) I Sijsling	7^{7}	5	6^{2}
(Lithuania) R Berankis	6^{4}	7	7^{7}
5	(Uzbekistan) D Istomin	6	6
(Belgium) Y Mertens	4	2
(Belgium) D Goffin	6	5	4
2	(Kazakhstan) M Kukushkin	2	7	6

Quarterfinals
Q	(Republic of Ireland) J McGee	6	5	2
(Lithuania) R Berankis	1	7	6
5	(Uzbekistan) D Istomin	6	6
2	(Kazakhstan) M Kukushkin	1	3

Semifinals
(Lithuania) R Berankis	6^{3}	6^{3}
5	(Uzbekistan) D Istomin	7^{7}	7^{7}
