= 2012 American Express – TED Open – Doubles =

TED Open – Doubles
- 2012 American Express – TED Open

Final
- Champions: (Slovakia) Karol Beck (Czech Republic) Lukáš Dlouhý
- Runners-up: (Spain) Adrián Menéndez (Australia) John Peers
- Score: 3–6, 6–2, [10–6]

Events
Singles	Doubles
- American Express – TED Open

During the 2012 American Express – TED Open doubles the defending champions of Carsten Ball and Andre Begemann decided not to participate.
Karol Beck and Lukáš Dlouhý won the final 3–6, 6–2, [10–6] against Adrián Menéndez and John Peers.

== Seeds ==
1. (Australia) Jordan Kerr / (Germany) Frank Moser (semifinals)
2. (Spain) Adrián Menéndez / (Australia) John Peers (final)
3. (Australia) Brydan Klein / (Australia) Dane Propoggia (first round)
4. (Montenegro) Goran Tošić / (United States) Denis Zivkovic (first round)

== Draw ==
Key

- Q = Qualifier
- WC = Wild card
- LL = Lucky loser
- Alt = Alternate
- ITF = ITF entry
- PR = Protected ranking
- SR = Special ranking
- SE = Special exempt
- JE = Junior exempt
- JR = Junior Accelerator Programme entrant
- CO = College Accelerator Programme entrant
- NG = Next Gen Accelerator Program entrant
- w/o = Walkover
- r = Retired
- d = Defaulted

=== Draw ===
First round
1	(Australia) J Kerr (Germany) F Moser	7^{9}	6
(United States) A Kuznetsov (Germany) M Zverev	6^{7}	4
(South Africa) Ruan Roelofse (Slovenia) G Žemlja	1	6^{5}
(United Kingdom) D Rice (United Kingdom) S Thornley	6	7^{7}
3	(Australia) B Klein (Australia) D Propoggia	6^{4}	6	4
(Slovakia) K Beck (Czech Republic) L Dlouhý	7^{7}	4	6
(Italy) R Ghedin (Italy) L Vanni	7	6
WC	(Turkey) Gökberk Ergeneman (Turkey) Efe Yurtacan	5	2
(United Kingdom) J Baker (Canada) É Chvojka	7^{7}	6
(Moldova) R Borvanov (Russia) I Kunitsyn	6^{4}	4
(United States) D Courtney (India) P Raja	6	6
4	(Montenegro) G Tošić (United States) D Zivkovic	3	3
(Moldova) R Albot (Russia) D Matsukevitch	7	6
WC	(Turkey) H Akkoyun (Turkey) B Erguden	5	3
WC	(Italy) L Giustino (Turkey) B Yalcinkale	3	2
2	(Spain) A Menéndez (Australia) J Peers	6	6

Quarterfinals
1	(Australia) J Kerr (Germany) F Moser	7^{7}	6
(United Kingdom) D Rice (United Kingdom) S Thornley	6^{1}	3
(Slovakia) K Beck (Czech Republic) L Dlouhý	6	6
(Italy) R Ghedin (Italy) L Vanni	4	4
(United Kingdom) J Baker (Canada) É Chvojka	2	6	[8]
(United States) D Courtney (India) P Raja	6	1	[10]
(Moldova) R Albot (Russia) D Matsukevitch	2	5
2	(Spain) A Menéndez (Australia) J Peers	6	7

Semifinals
1	(Australia) J Kerr (Germany) F Moser	4	6^{3}
(Slovakia) K Beck (Czech Republic) L Dlouhý	6	7^{7}
(United States) D Courtney (India) P Raja	6^{4}	6	[5]
2	(Spain) A Menéndez (Australia) J Peers	7^{7}	4	[10]

Final
(Slovakia) K Beck (Czech Republic) L Dlouhý	3	6	[10]
2	(Spain) A Menéndez (Australia) J Peers	6	2	[6]
