= 2017 Amex-Istanbul Challenger – Doubles =

Doubles
- 2017 Amex-Istanbul Challenger

Final
- Champions: (Germany) Andre Begemann (France) Jonathan Eysseric
- Runners-up: (Monaco) Romain Arneodo (France) Hugo Nys
- Score: 6–3, 5–7, [10–4]

Events
Singles	Doubles
← 2016 ·	Amex-Istanbul Challenger	· 2018 →

Sadio Doumbia and Calvin Hemery were the defending champions but chose not to defend their title.

Andre Begemann and Jonathan Eysseric won the title after defeating Romain Arneodo and Hugo Nys 6–3, 5–7, [10–4] in the final.

== Seeds ==
1. (Russia) Mikhail Elgin / (Chile) Hans Podlipnik-Castillo (first round)
2. (Germany) Andre Begemann / (France) Jonathan Eysseric (champions)
3. (India) Jeevan Nedunchezhiyan / (India) Divij Sharan (semifinals)
4. (Monaco) Romain Arneodo / (France) Hugo Nys (final)

== Draw ==
=== Key ===
- Q = Qualifier
- WC = Wild card
- LL = Lucky loser
- Alt = Alternate
- SE = Special exempt
- PR = Protected ranking
- ITF = ITF entry
- JE = Junior exempt
- w/o = Walkover
- r = Retired
- d = Defaulted
- SR = Special ranking

First round
1	(Russia) M Elgin (Chile) H Podlipnik-Castillo	3	4
WC	(Turkey) A Çelikbilek (Turkey) MN Türker	6	6
WC	(Turkey) Gökberk Ergeneman (Turkey) Muhammet Haylaz	1	4
WC	(Turkey) S Ağabigün (Turkey) A Yüksel	6	6
4	(Monaco) R Arneodo (France) H Nys	6	6
(France) B Bonzi (France) Y Jankovits	4	4
(United Kingdom) S Clayton (United Kingdom) J O'Mara	6	6
(Bosnia and Herzegovina) M Bašić (Belgium) Y Mertens	4	4
Alt	(Germany) R Kern (Germany) Marc Sieber	6	6
(Egypt) K-M Maamoun (Spain) R Ortega Olmedo	1	4
(Belarus) U Ignatik (Bosnia and Herzegovina) A Šetkić	3	4
3	(India) J Nedunchezhiyan (India) D Sharan	6	6
(Turkey) T Altuna (Turkey) C İlkel	3	7	[13]
(France) M Janvier (France) S Robert	6	5	[11]
(Lithuania) R Berankis (Russia) T Gabashvili	3	4
2	(Germany) A Begemann (France) J Eysseric	6	6

Quarterfinals
WC	(Turkey) A Çelikbilek (Turkey) MN Türker	3	3
WC	(Turkey) S Ağabigün (Turkey) A Yüksel	6	6
4	(Monaco) R Arneodo (France) H Nys	6	5	[12]
(United Kingdom) S Clayton (United Kingdom) J O'Mara	2	7	[10]
Alt	(Germany) R Kern (Germany) M Sieber	6	0	[8]
3	(India) J Nedunchezhiyan (India) D Sharan	4	6	[10]
(Turkey) T Altuna (Turkey) C İlkel	3	3
2	(Germany) A Begemann (France) J Eysseric	6	6

Semifinals
WC	(Turkey) S Ağabigün (Turkey) A Yüksel	2	2
4	(Monaco) R Arneodo (France) H Nys	6	6
3	(India) J Nedunchezhiyan (India) D Sharan	4	4
2	(Germany) A Begemann (France) J Eysseric	6	6

Final
4	(Monaco) R Arneodo (France) H Nys	3	7	[4]
2	(Germany) A Begemann (France) J Eysseric	6	5	[10]
