= 2015 Amex-Istanbul Challenger – Singles =

Singles
- 2015 Amex-Istanbul Challenger

Final
- Champion: (Russia) Karen Khachanov
- Runner-up: (Ukraine) Sergiy Stakhovsky
- Score: 4–6, 6–4, 6–3

Events
Singles	Doubles
← 2014 ·	Amex-Istanbul Challenger	· 2016 →

Adrian Mannarino was the defending champion, but chose not to defend his title.

== Seeds ==
1. (Ukraine) Sergiy Stakhovsky (final)
2. (Turkey) Marsel İlhan (first round)
3. (Moldova) Radu Albot (second round)
4. (Russia) Andrey Kuznetsov (semifinals)
5. (Kazakhstan) Aleksandr Nedovyesov (first round)
6. (Spain) Adrián Menéndez-Maceiras (second round)
7. (Sweden) Elias Ymer (quarterfinals)
8. (Bosnia and Herzegovina) Mirza Bašić (quarterfinals)

== Draw ==
=== Key ===
- Q = Qualifier
- WC = Wild card
- LL = Lucky loser
- Alt = Alternate
- SE = Special exempt
- PR = Protected ranking
- ITF = ITF entry
- JE = Junior exempt
- w/o = Walkover
- r = Retired
- d = Defaulted
- SR = Special ranking

=== Finals ===
Semifinals
1/WC	(Ukraine) Sergiy Stakhovsky	6	6
4	(Russia) Andrey Kuznetsov	2	3
(Belgium) Yannick Mertens	1	4
(Russia) Karen Khachanov	6	6

Final
1/WC	(Ukraine) Sergiy Stakhovsky	6	4	3
(Russia) Karen Khachanov	4	6	6

=== Top half ===
First round
1/WC	(Ukraine) S Stakhovsky	3	6	6
Q	(Belarus) I Ivashka	6	1	4
(Japan) Hiroyasu Ehara	2	2
(Germany) N Langer	6	6
(Romania) M Copil	7^{7}	6
(Georgia (country)) A Metreveli	6^{3}	3
WC	(Turkey) B Ergüden	2	2
6	(Spain) A Menéndez-Maceiras	6	6
4	(Russia) A Kuznetsov	6	6
LL	(Sweden) M Eriksson	2	3
(Belarus) D Zhyrmont	6	6
WC	(Turkey) Barkin Yalcinkale	2	2
Q	(Belarus) A Vasilevski	7^{7}	7
Q	(Russia) M Ledovskikh	6^{1}	5
(Italy) Erik Crepaldi	4	4
8	(Bosnia and Herzegovina) M Bašić	6	6

Second round
1/WC	(Ukraine) S Stakhovsky	2	7	7
(Germany) N Langer	6	5	5
(Romania) M Copil	4	6	6
6	(Spain) A Menéndez-Maceiras	6	4	4
4	(Russia) A Kuznetsov	1	6	6
(Belarus) D Zhyrmont	6	4	3
Q	(Belarus) A Vasilevski	6^{5}	3
8	(Bosnia and Herzegovina) M Bašić	7^{7}	6

Quarterfinals
1/WC	(Ukraine) S Stakhovsky	6	6
(Romania) M Copil	4	0
4	(Russia) A Kuznetsov	6^{2}	6	7
8	(Bosnia and Herzegovina) M Bašić	7^{7}	3	5

Semifinals
1/WC	(Ukraine) S Stakhovsky	6	6
4	(Russia) A Kuznetsov	2	3

=== Bottom half ===
First round
7	(Sweden) E Ymer	6	6
WC	(Turkey) A Yüksel	3	1
(Serbia) Ivan Bjelica	6	6
(Russia) I Gakhov	3	0
(Russia) A Zaitcev	2	2
(Belgium) Y Mertens	6	6
(Italy) M Bortolotti	3	3
3	(Moldova) R Albot	6	6
5	(Kazakhstan) A Nedovyesov	7^{9}	6^{7}	3
(Russia) K Khachanov	6^{7}	7^{9}	6
(Bosnia and Herzegovina) A Šetkić	2	3
Q	(Germany) D Masur	6	6
(Russia) A Kudryavtsev	6	6
(France) V Millot	1	3
(Russia) A Karatsev	6^{4}	6	6
2	(Turkey) M İlhan	7^{7}	3	1

Second round
7	(Sweden) E Ymer	7^{7}	6
(Serbia) I Bjelica	6^{2}	3
(Belgium) Y Mertens	6	7^{7}
3	(Moldova) R Albot	0	6^{3}
(Russia) K Khachanov	6	6
Q	(Germany) D Masur	1	3
(Russia) A Kudryavtsev	2	1^{r}
(Russia) A Karatsev	6	1

Quarterfinals
7	(Sweden) E Ymer	4	5
(Belgium) Y Mertens	6	7
(Russia) K Khachanov	6	6
(Russia) A Karatsev	4	4

Semifinals
(Belgium) Y Mertens	1	4
(Russia) K Khachanov	6	6
