= 2010 BMW Tennis Championship – Singles =

Singles
- 2010 BMW Tennis Championship

Final
- Champion: (Germany) Florian Mayer
- Runner-up: (France) Gilles Simon
- Score: 6–4, 6–4

Events
| Singles | Doubles |
| ← 2009 · | BMW Tennis Championship | · 2011 → |

Robin Söderling was the defending champion, but he competed in the BNP Paribas Open instead.
Florian Mayer won in the final 6–4, 6–4, against Gilles Simon.

== Seeds ==
1. (Czech Republic) Radek Štěpánek (second round)
2. (France) Gilles Simon (final)
3. (Germany) Benjamin Becker (quarterfinals)
4. (France) Jérémy Chardy (second round)
5. (Italy) Andreas Seppi (first round)
6. (Germany) Andreas Beck (first round, retired)
7. (Germany) Michael Berrer (quarterfinals)
8. (Germany) Florian Mayer (champion)

== Draw ==
=== Key ===
- Q = Qualifier
- WC = Wild card
- LL = Lucky loser
- Alt = Alternate
- ITF = ITF entry
- PR = Protected ranking
- SR = Special ranking
- SE = Special exempt
- JE = Junior exempt
- JR = Junior Accelerator Programme entrant
- CO = College Accelerator Programme entrant
- NG = Next Gen Accelerator Program entrant
- w/o = Walkover
- r = Retired
- d = Defaulted

=== Finals ===
Semifinals
(Argentina) Leonardo Mayer | 6^{2} | 6 | 3
8 | (Germany) Florian Mayer | 7 | 4 | 6
ALT | (Colombia) Santiago Giraldo | 1 | 2
2 | (France) Gilles Simon | 6 | 6

Final
8 | (Germany) Florian Mayer | 6 | 6
2 | (France) Gilles Simon | 4 | 4

=== Top half ===
First round
1/WC | (Czech Republic) R Štěpánek | 6 | 6
(Ukraine) S Stakhovsky | 1 | 3
(France) A Clément | 4 | 6 | 2
(Argentina) L Mayer | 6 | 1 | 6
(Germany) M Zverev | 7 | 0 | 6
(Brazil) M Daniel | 6^{4} | 6 | 1
Q | (United States) K Kim | 3 | 5
7 | (Germany) M Berrer | 6 | 7
4 | (France) J Chardy | 7 | 6
Q | (United States) B Reynolds | 6^{5} | 4
WC | (Austria) S Koubek | 6 | 6
Q | (Germany) B Phau | 3 | 3
(Germany) R Schüttler | 2 | 7 | 4
(Argentina) JI Chela | 6 | 6^{8} | 6
(Colombia) A Falla | 1 | 1
8 | (Germany) F Mayer | 6 | 6

Second round
1/WC | (Czech Republic) R Štěpánek | 6 | 3 | 3
(Argentina) L Mayer | 3 | 6 | 6
(Germany) M Zverev | 3 | 3
7 | (Germany) M Berrer | 6 | 6
4 | (France) J Chardy | 4 | 6^{6}
WC | (Austria) S Koubek | 6 | 7
(Argentina) JI Chela | 3 | 3
8 | (Germany) F Mayer | 6 | 6

Quarterfinals
(Argentina) L Mayer | 7 | 6^{2} | 6
7 | (Germany) M Berrer | 6^{1} | 7 | 4
WC | (Austria) S Koubek | 4 | 2
8 | (Germany) F Mayer | 6 | 6

Semifinals
(Argentina) L Mayer | 6^{2} | 6 | 3
8 | (Germany) F Mayer | 7 | 4 | 6

=== Bottom half ===
First round
6 | (Germany) A Beck | 3 | 0 | r
ALT | (Germany) D Brands | 6 | 1
WC | (United States) R Harrison | 2 | 1
ALT | (Colombia) S Giraldo | 6 | 6
ALT | (Chile) N Massú | 2 | 4
(Kazakhstan) A Golubev | 6 | 6
(France) F Serra | 7 | 4 | 4
3 | (Germany) B Becker | 5 | 6 | 6
5 | (Italy) A Seppi | 7 | 1 | 1
(Slovakia) L Lacko | 6^{7} | 6 | 6
WC | (France) S Grosjean | 2 | 7 | 0
(Czech Republic) J Hájek | 6 | 6^{10} | 6
(Italy) P Starace | 6 | 6
Q | (Israel) H Levy | 2 | 3
(France) R Gasquet | 4 | 4
2 | (France) G Simon | 6 | 6

Second round
ALT | (Germany) D Brands | 4 | 1
ALT | (Colombia) S Giraldo | 6 | 6
(Kazakhstan) A Golubev | 0 | 2
3 | (Germany) B Becker | 6 | 6
(Slovakia) L Lacko | 6^{5} | 6 | 3
(Czech Republic) J Hájek | 7 | 2 | 6
(Italy) P Starace | 6 | 2 | 5
2 | (France) G Simon | 4 | 6 | 7

Quarterfinals
ALT | (Colombia) S Giraldo | 6 | 6^{4} | 7
3 | (Germany) B Becker | 1 | 7 | 6^{5}
(Czech Republic) J Hájek | 3 | r
2 | (France) G Simon | 6

Semifinals
ALT | (Colombia) S Giraldo | 1 | 2
2 | (France) G Simon | 6 | 6
