= 2017 Amex-Istanbul Challenger – Singles =

Singles
- 2017 Amex-Istanbul Challenger

Final
- Champion: (Tunisia) Malek Jaziri
- Runner-up: (Italy) Matteo Berrettini
- Score: 7–6^{(7–4)}, 0–6, 7–5

Events
Singles	Doubles
← 2016 ·	Amex-Istanbul Challenger	· 2018 →

Malek Jaziri was the defending champion and successfully defended his title.

Jaziri won the title after defeating Matteo Berrettini 7–6^{(7–4)}, 0–6, 7–5 in the final.

== Seeds ==
1. (Tunisia) Malek Jaziri (champion)
2. (Uzbekistan) Denis Istomin (quarterfinals, retired)
3. (Romania) Marius Copil (first round)
4. (Russia) Evgeny Donskoy (quarterfinals)
5. (Kazakhstan) Alexander Bublik (semifinals)
6. (Italy) Matteo Berrettini (final)
7. (Italy) Luca Vanni (withdrew)
8. (Greece) Stefanos Tsitsipas (first round)

== Draw ==
=== Key ===
- Q = Qualifier
- WC = Wild card
- LL = Lucky loser
- Alt = Alternate
- SE = Special exempt
- PR = Protected ranking
- ITF = ITF entry
- JE = Junior exempt
- w/o = Walkover
- r = Retired
- d = Defaulted
- SR = Special ranking

=== Finals ===
Semifinals
1	(Tunisia) Malek Jaziri	6	4	6
(Egypt) Karim-Mohamed Maamoun	2	6	1
6	(Italy) Matteo Berrettini	7	6
5	(Kazakhstan) Alexander Bublik	5	3

Final
1	(Tunisia) Malek Jaziri	7^{7}	0	7
6	(Italy) Matteo Berrettini	6^{4}	6	5

=== Top half ===
First round
1	(Tunisia) M Jaziri	6	7^{8}
Q	(Germany) Marc Sieber	2	6^{6}
(France) B Bonzi	6	6^{1}	6
(France) J Eysseric	3	7^{7}	4
(Turkey) M İlhan	2	6	6
(Germany) T Kamke	6	2	3
(Turkey) C İlkel	2	6	4
LL	(Russia) Shalva Dzhanashia	6	2	6
3	(Romania) M Copil	2	5
(France) M Janvier	6	7
WC	(Turkey) Muhammet Haylaz	6^{1}	5
WC	(Turkey) A Çelikbilek	7^{7}	7
(Spain) R Ortega Olmedo	4	3
(Egypt) K-M Maamoun	6	6
(Belarus) U Ignatik	6	1	6
8	(Greece) S Tsitsipas	4	6	3

Second round
1	(Tunisia) M Jaziri	3	7^{8}	7
(France) B Bonzi	6	6^{6}	5
(Turkey) M İlhan	6	7
LL	(Russia) S Dzhanashia	2	5
(France) M Janvier	6^{8}	6	5
WC	(Turkey) A Çelikbilek	7^{10}	0	7
(Egypt) K-M Maamoun	6	3	6
(Belarus) U Ignatik	3	6	2

Quarterfinals
1	(Tunisia) M Jaziri	6	6^{4}	6
(Turkey) M İlhan	2	7^{7}	0
WC	(Turkey) A Çelikbilek	2	4
(Egypt) K-M Maamoun	6	6

Semifinals
1	(Tunisia) M Jaziri	6	4	6
(Egypt) K-M Maamoun	2	6	1

=== Bottom half ===
First round
6	(Italy) M Berrettini	7	6
(Lithuania) R Berankis	5	1
(France) S Robert	6^{6}	3
Q	(Germany) R Kern	7^{8}	6
(Bosnia and Herzegovina) M Bašić	3	6	7
Q	(Belgium) Y Mertens	6	3	5
(Russia) T Gabashvili	4	1^{r}
4	(Russia) E Donskoy	6	4
5	(Kazakhstan) A Bublik	6	7
WC	(Turkey) MN Türker	2	5
(Bosnia and Herzegovina) A Šetkić	2	3
(Italy) S Bolelli	6	6
WC	(Turkey) A Yüksel	1	3
Q	(Russia) R Safiullin	6	6
(France) V Millot	6^{4}	0^{r}
2	(Uzbekistan) D Istomin	7^{7}	0

Second round
6	(Italy) M Berrettini	6	6
Q	(Germany) R Kern	4	4
(Bosnia and Herzegovina) M Bašić	1	4
4	(Russia) E Donskoy	6	6
5	(Kazakhstan) A Bublik	2	6	6
(Italy) S Bolelli	6	0	1
Q	(Russia) R Safiullin	3	6	6^{3}
2	(Uzbekistan) D Istomin	6	3	7^{7}

Quarterfinals
6	(Italy) M Berrettini	6	6
4	(Russia) E Donskoy	2	4
5	(Kazakhstan) A Bublik	3
2	(Uzbekistan) D Istomin	2^{r}

Semifinals
6	(Italy) M Berrettini	7	6
5	(Kazakhstan) A Bublik	5	3
