= 2025 Istanbul Challenger – Doubles =

Doubles
- 2025 Istanbul Challenger

Final
- Champions: (Slovakia) Miloš Karol (Germany) Daniel Masur
- Runners-up: (Greece) Stefanos Sakellaridis (India) Karan Singh
- Score: 7–6^{(7–2)}, 6–1

Events
Singles	Doubles
- Istanbul Challenger

Aleksandre Bakshi and Yankı Erel were the defending champions but only Bakshi chose to defend his title, partnering Saba Purtseladze. They retired from their first round match against Guido Andreozzi and Daniil Golubev.

Miloš Karol and Daniel Masur won the title after defeating Stefanos Sakellaridis and Karan Singh 7–6^{(7–2)}, 6–1 in the final.

== Seeds ==
1. (Romania) Alexandru Jecan / (Romania) Bogdan Pavel (semifinals)
2. (Bulgaria) Alexander Donski / (Serbia) Stefan Latinović (first round)
3. (Slovakia) Miloš Karol / (Germany) Daniel Masur (champions)
4. (Lebanon) Benjamin Hassan / (Germany) Andreas Mies (semifinals)

== Draw ==
Key

- Q = Qualifier
- WC = Wild card
- LL = Lucky loser
- Alt = Alternate
- ITF = ITF entry
- PR = Protected ranking
- SR = Special ranking
- SE = Special exempt
- JE = Junior exempt
- JR = Junior Accelerator Programme entrant
- CO = College Accelerator Programme entrant
- NG = Next Gen Accelerator Program entrant
- w/o = Walkover
- r = Retired
- d = Defaulted

=== Draw ===
First round
1	(Romania) A Jecan (Romania) B Pavel	7	7
WC	(Turkey) K Kırcı (Turkey) S Mert Özdemir	5	5
(Mexico) A Hernández (Mexico) R Pacheco Méndez	7^{7}	6
(Slovakia) N Gombos (Slovakia) L Klein	6^{4}	2
3	(Slovakia) M Karol (Germany) D Masur	6	7
WC	(Turkey) Gökberk Sarıtaş (Turkey) MN Türker	2	5
(Finland) P Niklas-Salminen (Finland) O Virtanen	6^{5}	6	[4]
Alt	(Turkey) A Azkara (Ukraine) Vadym Ursu	7^{7}	4	[10]
(Argentina) G Andreozzi; D Golubev	3
(Georgia (country)) A Bakshi (Georgia (country)) S Purtseladze	3^{r}
(Colombia) N Mejía (Colombia) Miguel Tobón	6	2	[3]
4	(Lebanon) B Hassan (Germany) A Mies	3	6	[10]
(United States) B Kittay (Colombia) C Rodríguez	6^{6}	6^{5}
(Norway) V Durasovic (Norway) L Hellum Lilleengen	7^{8}	7^{7}
Alt	(Greece) S Sakellaridis (India) K Singh	6	7^{7}
2	(Bulgaria) A Donski (Serbia) S Latinović	4	6^{5}

Quarterfinals
1	(Romania) A Jecan (Romania) B Pavel	7	7^{7}
(Mexico) A Hernández (Mexico) R Pacheco Méndez	5	6^{4}
3	(Slovakia) M Karol (Germany) D Masur	6	6
Alt	(Turkey) A Azkara (Ukraine) V Ursu	1	2
(Argentina) G Andreozzi; D Golubev	6^{1}	7^{8}	[3]
4	(Lebanon) B Hassan (Germany) A Mies	7^{7}	6^{6}	[10]
(Norway) V Durasovic (Norway) L Hellum Lilleengen	2	7^{7}	[4]
Alt	(Greece) S Sakellaridis (India) K Singh	6	6^{4}	[10]

Semifinals
1	(Romania) A Jecan (Romania) B Pavel	4	4
3	(Slovakia) M Karol (Germany) D Masur	6	6
4	(Lebanon) B Hassan (Germany) A Mies	3	4
Alt	(Greece) S Sakellaridis (India) K Singh	6	6

Final
3	(Slovakia) M Karol (Germany) D Masur	7^{7}	6
Alt	(Greece) S Sakellaridis (India) K Singh	6^{2}	1
