= 2010 BMW Tennis Championship – Doubles =

Doubles
- 2010 BMW Tennis Championship

Final
- Champions: (Czech Republic) Martin Damm (Slovakia) Filip Polášek
- Runners-up: (Czech Republic) Lukáš Dlouhý (India) Leander Paes
- Score: 4–6, 6–1, [13–11]

Events
Singles	Doubles
← 2009 ·	BMW Tennis Championship	· 2011 →

Eric Butorac and Bobby Reynolds were the defending champions, but Butorac competed in the BNP Paribas Open instead and chose to not participate this year.
Reynolds partnered up by André Sá. However, they lost to Lukáš Dlouhý and Leander Paes in the semifinal.
Martin Damm and Filip Polášek won in the final 4–6, 6–1, [13–11], against Dlouhý and L Paes.

== Seeds ==
1. (Czech Republic) Lukáš Dlouhý / (India) Leander Paes (final)
2. (India) Mahesh Bhupathi / (Belarus) Max Mirnyi (first round)
3. (Germany) Christopher Kas / (Belgium) Dick Norman (first round)
4. (Brazil) Marcelo Melo / (Brazil) Bruno Soares (quarterfinals)

== Draw ==
=== Key ===
- Q = Qualifier
- WC = Wild card
- LL = Lucky loser
- Alt = Alternate
- SE = Special exempt
- PR = Protected ranking
- ITF = ITF entry
- JE = Junior exempt
- w/o = Walkover
- r = Retired
- d = Defaulted
- SR = Special ranking

=== Draw ===
First round
1	(Czech Republic) L Dlouhý (India) L Paes	6	6
(South Africa) R de Voest (Netherlands) R Wassen	0	3
(Australia) S Huss (United States) S Lipsky	3	7	[8]
(Germany) M Berrer (France) R Gasquet	6	6^{4}	[10]
3	(Germany) C Kas (Belgium) D Norman	6^{4}	1
(United States) B Reynolds (Brazil) A Sá	7	6
(Germany) B Becker (Argentina) L Mayer	3	5
(Ukraine) S Stakhovsky (Germany) M Zverev	6	7
WC	(France) A Clément (France) S Grosjean	7	6
WC	(United States) R Kendrick (United States) A Lake	6^{5}	2
WC	(Germany) C Blocker (Austria) D Simon	4	3
4	(Brazil) M Melo (Brazil) B Soares	6	6
(Austria) O Marach (Germany) R Schüttler	4	7	[8]
(Brazil) M Daniel (Italy) A Seppi	6	6^{6}	[10]
(Czech Republic) M Damm (Slovakia) F Polášek	6	6
2	(India) M Bhupathi (Belarus) M Mirnyi	4	3

Quarterfinals
1	(Czech Republic) L Dlouhý (India) L Paes	6	6
(Germany) M Berrer (France) R Gasquet	2	4
(United States) B Reynolds (Brazil) A Sá	6	7
(Ukraine) S Stakhovsky (Germany) M Zverev	2	5
WC	(France) A Clément (France) S Grosjean	7	6
4	(Brazil) M Melo (Brazil) B Soares	6^{2}	4
(Brazil) M Daniel (Italy) A Seppi	3	2
(Czech Republic) M Damm (Slovakia) F Polášek	6	6

Semifinals
1	(Czech Republic) L Dlouhý (India) L Paes	6	6
(United States) B Reynolds (Brazil) A Sá	2	4
WC	(France) A Clément (France) S Grosjean	4	4
(Czech Republic) M Damm (Slovakia) F Polášek	6	6

Finals
1	(Czech Republic) L Dlouhý (India) L Paes	6	1	[11]
(Czech Republic) M Damm (Slovakia) F Polášek	4	6	[13]
