= 2009 BMW Tennis Championship – Singles =

Singles
- 2009 BMW Tennis Championship

Final
- Champion: (Sweden) Robin Söderling
- Runner-up: (Czech Republic) Tomáš Berdych
- Score: 6–1, 6–1

Events
Singles	Doubles
← 2008 ·	BMW Tennis Championship	· 2010 →

Robin Haase was the defending champion, but he did not defend his title due to an injury.
Robin Söderling, who would have been the 2nd seed, entered late and played the qualifying tournament. He was not seeded in the main draw, but he defeated: Müller, Bolelli, Schüttler, López and he reached the final. He won 6–1, 6–1, against 1st seeded Tomáš Berdych in the last match of this tournament.

== Seeds ==
1. (Czech Republic) Tomáš Berdych (final)
2. (Germany) Rainer Schüttler (quarterfinals)
3. (Spain) Feliciano López (semifinals)
4. (Russia) Igor Kunitsyn (second round)
5. (Italy) Simone Bolelli (second round)
6. (Argentina) José Acasuso (first round)
7. (Serbia) Janko Tipsarević (semifinals)
8. (France) Florent Serra (first round)

== Draw ==
=== Key ===
- Q = Qualifier
- WC = Wild card
- LL = Lucky loser
- Alt = Alternate
- ITF = ITF entry
- PR = Protected ranking
- SR = Special ranking
- SE = Special exempt
- JE = Junior exempt
- JR = Junior Accelerator Programme entrant
- CO = College Accelerator Programme entrant
- NG = Next Gen Accelerator Program entrant
- w/o = Walkover
- r = Retired
- d = Defaulted

=== Final four ===
Semifinals
1	(Czech Republic) Tomáš Berdych	6	6
(Serbia) Janko Tipsarević	0	4
3	(Spain) Feliciano López	4	4
Q	(Sweden) Robin Söderling	6	6

Final
1	(Czech Republic) Tomáš Berdych	1	1
Q	(Sweden) Robin Söderling	6	6

=== Top half ===
First round
1/WC	(Czech Republic) T Berdych	6	6
(France) N Devilder	1	0
(Ukraine) S Stakhovsky	2	3
(France) M Gicquel	6	6
(France) A Clément	6	6
(Argentina) D Junqueira	2	2
(Israel) D Sela	4	6	1
6	(Argentina) J Acasuso	6	3	0^{r}
4	(Russia) I Kunitsyn	7	6^{5}	7
(Argentina) M Vassallo Argüello	6^{5}	7	5
(Italy) P Starace	1	4
(Russia) T Gabashvili	6	6
(Chinese Taipei) Y-h Lu	6^{8}	6	3
WC	(Austria) S Koubek	7	1	6
WC	(United States) W Odesnik	6^{6}	5
7	(Serbia) J Tipsarević	7	7

Second round
1/WC	(Czech Republic) T Berdych	4	6	6
(France) M Gicquel	6	4	1
(France) A Clément	5
(Israel) D Sela	0	r
4	(Russia) I Kunitsyn	6^{2}	1
(Russia) T Gabashvili	7	6
WC	(Austria) S Koubek	3	1
7	(Serbia) J Tipsarević	6	6

Quarterfinals
1/WC	(Czech Republic) T Berdych	7	6
(France) A Clément	6^{3}	4
(Russia) T Gabashvili	3	6	6^{6}
7	(Serbia) J Tipsarević	6	0	7

Semifinals
1/WC	(Czech Republic) T Berdych	6	6
7	(Serbia) J Tipsarević	0	4

=== Bottom half ===
First round
8	(France) F Serra	5	4
(Germany) M Zverev	7	6
WC	(Sweden) T Johansson	4	0
Q	(Germany) D Gremelmayr	6	6
(United States) B Reynolds	3	5
(Russia) M Youzhny	6	7
(Brazil) T Bellucci	6^{5}	6^{2}
3	(Spain) F López	7	7
5	(Italy) S Bolelli	6	6
(Belgium) C Rochus	2	4
(Luxembourg) G Müller	3	1
Q	(Sweden) R Söderling	6	6
(Belgium) S Darcis	6	7
Q	(Germany) B Phau	2	5
Q	(Russia) E Korolev	6	4	6^{4}
2	(Germany) R Schüttler	2	6	7

Second round
(Germany) M Zverev	7	4	6
Q	(Germany) D Gremelmayr	5	6	0
(Russia) M Youzhny	2	3
3	(Spain) F López	6	6
5	(Italy) S Bolelli	6^{6}	2
Q	(Sweden) R Söderling	7	6
(Belgium) S Darcis	6^{6}	3
2	(Germany) R Schüttler	7	6

Quarterfinals
(Germany) M Zverev	3	1
3	(Spain) F López	6	6
Q	(Sweden) R Söderling	6^{5}	7	7
2	(Germany) R Schüttler	7	5	6^{5}

Semifinals
3	(Spain) F López	4	4
Q	(Sweden) R Söderling	6	6
