= 2014 Amex-Istanbul Challenger – Doubles =

Doubles
- 2014 Amex-Istanbul Challenger

Final
- Champions: (United Kingdom) Colin Fleming (United Kingdom) Jonathan Marray
- Runners-up: (Australia) Jordan Kerr (France) Fabrice Martin
- Score: 6–4, 2–6, [10–8]

Events
Singles	Doubles
← 2013 ·	Amex-Istanbul Challenger	· 2015 →

Jamie Delgado and Jordan Kerr were the defending champions. Delgado chose not to compete this year, while Kerr partnered Fabrice Martin but they lost in the final to Colin Fleming and Jonathan Marray, 4–6, 6–2, [8–10].

== Seeds ==
1. (United Kingdom) Colin Fleming / (United Kingdom) Jonathan Marray (champions)
2. (Belarus) Sergey Betov / (Belarus) Alexander Bury (quarterfinals)
3. (India) Purav Raja / (Sweden) Andreas Siljeström (first round)
4. (New Zealand) Marcus Daniell / (India) Divij Sharan (semifinals)

== Draw ==
=== Key ===
- Q = Qualifier
- WC = Wild card
- LL = Lucky loser
- Alt = Alternate
- SE = Special exempt
- PR = Protected ranking
- ITF = ITF entry
- JE = Junior exempt
- w/o = Walkover
- r = Retired
- d = Defaulted
- SR = Special ranking

=== Draw ===
First round
1	(United Kingdom) C Fleming (United Kingdom) J Marray	6	6
(Japan) H Moriya (Germany) A Zverev	1	2
(Belarus) E Gerasimov (Russia) A Kudryavtsev	6	6^{6}	[10]
(Turkey) M İlhan (Turkey) C İlkel	3	7^{8}	[5]
4	(New Zealand) M Daniell (India) D Sharan	4	6	[10]
WC	(Turkey) B Ergüden (Turkey) A Yüksel	6	3	[5]
(Tunisia) M Jaziri (Chinese Taipei) J Wang	6	6
(Romania) P Grigoriu (Romania) C Pavăl	3	4
WC	(Turkey) Gokberk Ergeneman (Greece) M Kalovelonis	4	6^{3}
(Russia) V Baluda (Belarus) Y Shyla	6	7^{7}
(Japan) T Ito (Japan) Y Uchiyama	7	6
3	(India) P Raja (Sweden) A Siljeström	5	2
WC	(Turkey) T Altuna (Bulgaria) D Kuzmanov	2	4
(Australia) J Kerr (France) F Martin	6	6
(Germany) T Kamke (Germany) P Petzschner	5	7^{7}	[8]
2	(Belarus) S Betov (Belarus) A Bury	7	6^{5}	[10]

Quarterfinals
1	(United Kingdom) C Fleming (United Kingdom) J Marray	6	6
(Belarus) E Gerasimov (Russia) A Kudryavtsev	4	1
4	(New Zealand) M Daniell (India) D Sharan	6	6
(Tunisia) M Jaziri (Chinese Taipei) J Wang	3	4
(Russia) V Baluda (Belarus) Y Shyla	6	6
(Japan) T Ito (Japan) Y Uchiyama	2	2
(Australia) J Kerr (France) F Martin	7^{7}	3	[10]
2	(Belarus) S Betov (Belarus) A Bury	6^{5}	6	[7]

Semifinals
1	(United Kingdom) C Fleming (United Kingdom) J Marray	6	6
4	(New Zealand) M Daniell (India) D Sharan	2	3
(Russia) V Baluda (Belarus) Y Shyla	1	4
(Australia) J Kerr (France) F Martin	6	6

Final
1	(United Kingdom) C Fleming (United Kingdom) J Marray	6	2	[10]
(Australia) J Kerr (France) F Martin	4	6	[8]
