= 2009 BMW Tennis Championship – Doubles =

Doubles
- 2009 BMW Tennis Championship

Final
- Champions: (United States) Eric Butorac (United States) Bobby Reynolds
- Runners-up: (South Africa) Jeff Coetzee (Australia) Jordan Kerr
- Score: 5–7, 6–4, 10–4

Events
Singles	Doubles
← 2008 ·	BMW Tennis Championship	· 2010 →

Janko Tipsarević and Dušan Vemić were the defending champions; however, they lost to František Čermák and Michal Mertiňák in the first round.
Eric Butorac and Bobby Reynolds won in the final 5–7, 6–4, 10–4, against Jeff Coetzee and Jordan Kerr.

== Seeds ==
1. (South Africa) Jeff Coetzee / (Australia) Jordan Kerr (final)
2. (Czech Republic) František Čermák / (Slovakia) Michal Mertiňák (quarterfinals)
3. (Australia) Paul Hanley / (Australia) Stephen Huss (semifinals)
4. (Slovakia) Filip Polášek / (Ukraine) Sergiy Stakhovsky (semifinals)

== Draw ==
=== Key ===
- Q = Qualifier
- WC = Wild card
- LL = Lucky loser
- Alt = Alternate
- SE = Special exempt
- PR = Protected ranking
- ITF = ITF entry
- JE = Junior exempt
- w/o = Walkover
- r = Retired
- d = Defaulted
- SR = Special ranking

=== Draw ===
First round
1	(South Africa) J Coetzee (Australia) J Kerr	6^{6}	6	[13]
WC	(France) A Clément (France) N Mahut	7	2	[11]
(Russia) M Youzhny (Germany) M Zverev	6	6
ALT	(Brazil) T Bellucci (Argentina) D Junqueira	4	2
3	(Australia) P Hanley (Australia) S Huss	7	7
WC	(Belgium) S Darcis (Russia) E Korolev	5	5
(Australia) A Fisher (United States) S Lipsky	6	6
(South Africa) R de Voest (United States) D Martin	3	4
(Italy) S Bolelli (Italy) F Cipolla	5	6^{6}
(Argentina) J Acasuso (Argentina) M Vassallo Argüello	7	7
(France) N Devilder (France) M Gicquel	2	3
4	(Slovakia) F Polášek (Ukraine) S Stakhovsky	6	6
(United States) E Butorac (United States) B Reynolds	7	6
WC	(Belgium) C Rochus (Belgium) O Rochus	5	2
(Serbia) J Tipsarević (Serbia) D Vemić	6	3	[3]
2	(Czech Republic) F Čermák (Slovakia) M Mertiňák	4	6	[10]

Quarterfinals
1	(South Africa) J Coetzee (Australia) J Kerr	6	3	[10]
(Russia) M Youzhny (Germany) M Zverev	3	6	[6]
3	(Australia) P Hanley (Australia) S Huss	6	3	[17]
(Australia) A Fisher (United States) S Lipsky	3	6	[15]
(Argentina) J Acasuso (Argentina) M Vassallo Argüello	3	5
4	(Slovakia) F Polášek (Ukraine) S Stakhovsky	6	7
(United States) E Butorac (United States) B Reynolds	6	2	[10]
2	(Czech Republic) F Čermák (Slovakia) M Mertiňák	2	6	[5]

Semifinals
1	(South Africa) J Coetzee (Australia) J Kerr	3	6	[10]
3	(Australia) P Hanley (Australia) S Huss	6	4	[3]
4	(Slovakia) F Polášek (Ukraine) S Stakhovsky	5	6^{9}
(United States) E Butorac (United States) B Reynolds	7	7

Finals
1	(South Africa) J Coetzee (Australia) J Kerr	7	4	[4]
(United States) E Butorac (United States) B Reynolds	5	6	[10]
