= 2016 Amex-Istanbul Challenger – Doubles =

Doubles
- 2016 Amex-Istanbul Challenger

Final
- Champions: (France) Sadio Doumbia (France) Calvin Hemery
- Runners-up: (Switzerland) Marco Chiudinelli (Romania) Marius Copil
- Score: 6–4, 6–3

Events
| Singles | Doubles |
| ← 2015 · | Amex-Istanbul Challenger | · 2017 → |

Andrey Kuznetsov and Aleksandr Nedovyesov were the defending champions but chose not to participate.

Sadio Doumbia and Calvin Hemery won the title after defeating Marco Chiudinelli and Marius Copil 6–4, 6–3 in the final.

== Seeds ==
1. (South Africa) Dean O'Brien / (South Africa) Ruan Roelofse (quarterfinals)
2. (Croatia) Ivan Sabanov / (Croatia) Matej Sabanov (quarterfinals)
3. (Russia) Alexandr Igoshin / (Russia) Yan Sabanin (first round)
4. (United States) John Paul Fruttero / (Spain) Adrián Menéndez-Maceiras (first round)

== Draw ==
=== Key ===
- Q = Qualifier
- WC = Wild card
- LL = Lucky loser
- Alt = Alternate
- SE = Special exempt
- PR = Protected ranking
- ITF = ITF entry
- JE = Junior exempt
- w/o = Walkover
- r = Retired
- d = Defaulted
- SR = Special ranking

First round
1 | (South Africa) D O'Brien (South Africa) R Roelofse | 6 | 6
WC | (Turkey) U Akkoyun (Turkey) Barkın Yalçinkale | 1 | 2
(Italy) A Bega (Belgium) Y Mertens | 1 | 0
(France) S Doumbia (France) C Hemery | 6 | 6
3 | (Russia) Alexandr Igoshin (Russia) Yan Sabanin | 5 | 3
(Turkey) T Altuna (Turkey) C İlkel | 7 | 6
WC | (Netherlands) T Griekspoor (Turkey) A Yüksel | 6 | 0 | [10]
WC | (Turkey) S Ağabigün (Turkey) A Çelikbilek | 4 | 6 | [6]
(Germany) Y Hanfmann (Germany) Marc Sieber | 6 | 6
(Czech Republic) Michal Konečný (Russia) D Matsukevich | 1 | 2
(Belgium) K Coppejans (Italy) Francesco Vilardo | 3 | 6 | [12]
4 | (United States) JP Fruttero (Spain) A Menéndez-Maceiras | 6 | 1 | [10]
(Switzerland) M Chiudinelli (Romania) M Copil | 6 | 6
(Serbia) N Milojević (Bosnia and Herzegovina) A Šetkić | 2 | 1
(Bulgaria) D Kuzmanov (Croatia) A Pavić | 4 | 6^{4}
2 | (Croatia) I Sabanov (Croatia) M Sabanov | 6 | 7^{7}

Quarterfinals
1 | (South Africa) D O'Brien (South Africa) R Roelofse | 3 | 6 | [8]
(France) S Doumbia (France) C Hemery | 6 | 0 | [10]
(Turkey) T Altuna (Turkey) C İlkel | 7^{7} | 3 | [11]
WC | (Netherlands) T Griekspoor (Turkey) A Yüksel | 6^{2} | 6 | [9]
(Germany) Y Hanfmann (Germany) M Sieber | 4 | 4
(Belgium) K Coppejans (Italy) F Vilardo | 6 | 6
(Switzerland) M Chiudinelli (Romania) M Copil | 6 | 6
2 | (Croatia) I Sabanov (Croatia) M Sabanov | 3 | 3

Semifinals
(France) S Doumbia (France) C Hemery | 6 | 7^{7}
(Turkey) T Altuna (Turkey) C İlkel | 1 | 6^{2}
(Belgium) K Coppejans (Italy) F Vilardo | 0 | 3
(Switzerland) M Chiudinelli (Romania) M Copil | 6 | 6

Final
(France) S Doumbia (France) C Hemery | 6 | 6
(Switzerland) M Chiudinelli (Romania) M Copil | 4 | 3
