= 2025 Istanbul Challenger – Singles =

Singles
- 2025 Istanbul Challenger

Final
- Champion: (Slovakia) Alex Molčan
- Runner-up: (Colombia) Nicolás Mejía
- Score: 7–6^{(11–9)}, 6–2

Events
Singles	Doubles
- Istanbul Challenger

Damir Džumhur was the two-time defending champion but chose not to defend his title.

Alex Molčan won the title after defeating Nicolás Mejía 7–6^{(11–9)}, 6–2 in the final.

== Seeds ==
1. (Slovakia) Lukáš Klein (second round)
2. (Finland) Otto Virtanen (second round, retired)
3. (Spain) Martín Landaluce (second round)
4. (France) Harold Mayot (withdrew)
5. (Tunisia) Moez Echargui (first round)
6. (France) Calvin Hemery (quarterfinals)
7. (France) Hugo Grenier (quarterfinals)
8. (Lebanon) Benjamin Hassan (first round)
9. (Mexico) Rodrigo Pacheco Méndez (first round)

== Draw ==
Key

- Q = Qualifier
- WC = Wild card
- LL = Lucky loser
- Alt = Alternate
- ITF = ITF entry
- PR = Protected ranking
- SR = Special ranking
- SE = Special exempt
- JE = Junior exempt
- JR = Junior Accelerator Programme entrant
- CO = College Accelerator Programme entrant
- NG = Next Gen Accelerator Program entrant
- w/o = Walkover
- r = Retired
- d = Defaulted

=== Finals ===
Semifinals
(Colombia) Nicolás Mejía	6	6
Q	(Italy) Luca Potenza	3	1
Alt	(Slovakia) Alex Molčan	6	6
(Greece) Stefanos Sakellaridis	2	4

Final
(Colombia) Nicolás Mejía	6^{9}	2
Alt	(Slovakia) Alex Molčan	7^{11}	6

=== Top half ===
First round
1	(Slovakia) L Klein	6	6
(Georgia (country)) S Purtseladze	4	3
Q	(Slovakia) Michal Krajčí	3	2
Alt	(Slovakia) M Karol	6	6
PR	I Ivashka	2	1^{r}
(Colombia) N Mejía	6	2
(Czech Republic) M Gengel	6	3	6
8	(Lebanon) B Hassan	4	6	2
9	(Mexico) R Pacheco Méndez	2	6	6^{5}
(Slovakia) N Gombos	6	2	7^{7}
WC	(Turkey) K Kırcı	5	5
Q	(Italy) Luca Potenza	7	7
WC	(Turkey) Kaya Arınç	6^{3}	2
WC	(Turkey) MN Türker	7^{7}	6
Q	(Hungary) Péter Makk	4	4
6	(France) C Hemery	6	6

Second round
1	(Slovakia) L Klein	7^{8}	2	5
Alt	(Slovakia) M Karol	6^{6}	6	7
(Colombia) N Mejía	7^{10}	3	6
(Czech Republic) M Gengel	6^{8}	6	2
(Slovakia) N Gombos	5	3
Q	(Italy) L Potenza	7	6
WC	(Turkey) MN Türker	2	6	3
6	(France) C Hemery	6	3	6

Quarterfinals
Alt	(Slovakia) M Karol	2	6^{1}
(Colombia) N Mejía	6	7^{7}
Q	(Italy) L Potenza	6	7^{7}
6	(France) C Hemery	4	6^{5}

Semifinals
(Colombia) N Mejía	6	6
Q	(Italy) L Potenza	3	1

=== Bottom half ===
First round
5	(Tunisia) M Echargui	4	4
(Jordan) A Shelbayh	6	6
Alt	(Germany) M Rosenkranz	6^{5}	3
(Norway) V Durasovic	7^{7}	6
Q	I Nedelko	4	0^{r}
Alt	(Slovakia) A Molčan	6	1
Q	(Ukraine) Vadym Ursu	3	0
3	(Spain) M Landaluce	6	6
7	(France) H Grenier	7^{7}	6
Q	(Mexico) A Hernández	6^{5}	3
(Switzerland) M-A Hüsler	3	6	4
Alt	(United Kingdom) A Gray	6	2	6
(Greece) S Sakellaridis	4	6	6
(United States) Christian Langmo	6	3	4
P Kotov	4	2
2	(Finland) O Virtanen	6	6

Second round
(Jordan) A Shelbayh	6	6
(Norway) V Durasovic	4	0
Alt	(Slovakia) A Molčan	6	6
3	(Spain) M Landaluce	3	4
7	(France) H Grenier	6^{1}	6	6
Alt	(United Kingdom) A Gray	7^{7}	1	2
(Greece) S Sakellaridis	6	3
2	(Finland) O Virtanen	2	1^{r}

Quarterfinals
(Jordan) A Shelbayh	6	1	6^{5}
Alt	(Slovakia) A Molčan	4	6	7^{7}
7	(France) H Grenier	5	7^{7}	2
(Greece) S Sakellaridis	7	6^{3}	6

Semifinals
Alt	(Slovakia) A Molčan	6	6
(Greece) S Sakellaridis	2	4
