= 2016 Amex-Istanbul Challenger – Singles =

Singles
- 2016 Amex-Istanbul Challenger

Final
- Champion: (Tunisia) Malek Jaziri
- Runner-up: (Israel) Dudi Sela
- Score: 1–6, 6–1, 6–0

Events
Singles	Doubles
← 2015 ·	Amex-Istanbul Challenger	· 2017 →

Karen Khachanov was the defending champion but chose not to participate.

Malek Jaziri won the title after defeating Dudi Sela 1–6, 6–1, 6–0 in the final.

== Seeds ==
1. (Tunisia) Malek Jaziri (champion)
2. (Israel) Dudi Sela (final)
3. (Germany) Tobias Kamke (semifinals)
4. (Switzerland) Marco Chiudinelli (semifinals)
5. (Romania) Marius Copil (quarterfinals)
6. (Spain) Adrián Menéndez-Maceiras (second round)
7. (Bosnia and Herzegovina) Aldin Šetkić (first round)
8. (Serbia) Nikola Milojević (first round)

== Draw ==
=== Key ===
- Q = Qualifier
- WC = Wild card
- LL = Lucky loser
- Alt = Alternate
- SE = Special exempt
- PR = Protected ranking
- ITF = ITF entry
- JE = Junior exempt
- w/o = Walkover
- r = Retired
- d = Defaulted
- SR = Special ranking

=== Finals ===
Semifinals
1	(Tunisia) Malek Jaziri	6	6
3	(Germany) Tobias Kamke	3	4
4	(Switzerland) Marco Chiudinelli	3	3
2	(Israel) Dudi Sela	6	6

Final
1	(Tunisia) Malek Jaziri	1	6	6
2	(Israel) Dudi Sela	6	1	0

=== Top half ===
First round
1	(Tunisia) M Jaziri	6	7^{7}
(Bulgaria) D Kuzmanov	4	6^{3}
WC	(Turkey) Muhammet Haylaz	6	4	6
(France) C Hemery	4	6	1
WC	(Turkey) A Çelikbilek	7	6
(Slovakia) F Horanský	5	4
(Germany) Marc Sieber	5	7^{7}	6
7	(Bosnia and Herzegovina) A Šetkić	7	6^{3}	2
3	(Germany) T Kamke	6	6
(Netherlands) S Griekspoor	4	3
Q	(Colombia) DE Galán	6	7^{7}
(Ukraine) V Manafov	3	6^{1}
WC	(Turkey) A Yüksel	6	7^{7}
Q	(Spain) José Francisco Vidal Azorín	2	6^{2}
(Germany) Y Hanfmann	6^{3}	6	1
5	(Romania) M Copil	7^{7}	4	6

Second round
1	(Tunisia) M Jaziri	3	6	6
WC	(Turkey) M Haylaz	6	3	2
WC	(Turkey) A Çelikbilek	6	1	4
(Germany) M Sieber	4	6	6
3	(Germany) T Kamke	6	6
Q	(Colombia) DE Galán	3	2
WC	(Turkey) A Yüksel	6	6^{2}	4
5	(Romania) M Copil	3	7^{7}	6

Quarterfinals
1	(Tunisia) M Jaziri	6	6
(Germany) M Sieber	4	0
3	(Germany) T Kamke	6	6
5	(Romania) M Copil	2	4

Semifinals
1	(Tunisia) M Jaziri	6	6
3	(Germany) T Kamke	3	4

=== Bottom half ===
First round
8	(Serbia) N Milojević	7^{7}	6^{5}	1
(Turkey) M İlhan	6^{5}	7^{7}	6
(Belgium) Y Mertens	6	6
WC	(Turkey) Barkın Yalçinkale	0	0
(Croatia) A Pavić	6	6
PR	(Russia) D Matsukevich	1	2
Q	(Russia) Vitaly Kozyukov	5	0
4	(Switzerland) M Chiudinelli	7	6
6	(Spain) A Menéndez-Maceiras	7^{7}	6
(Spain) Marc Giner	6^{4}	1
Q	(Turkey) C İlkel	3	5
(Czech Republic) Michal Konečný	6	7
(Italy) A Bega	6^{2}	2
(France) S Doumbia	7^{7}	6
(Netherlands) T Griekspoor	2	5
2	(Israel) D Sela	6	7

Second round
(Turkey) M İlhan	6	6
(Belgium) Y Mertens	3	4
(Croatia) A Pavić	1	2
4	(Switzerland) M Chiudinelli	6	6
6	(Spain) A Menéndez-Maceiras	6	1	4
(Czech Republic) M Konečný	4	6	6
(France) S Doumbia	2	1
2	(Israel) D Sela	6	6

Quarterfinals
(Turkey) M İlhan	4	2
4	(Switzerland) M Chiudinelli	6	6
(Czech Republic) M Konečný	1	5
2	(Israel) D Sela	6	7

Semifinals
4	(Switzerland) M Chiudinelli	3	3
2	(Israel) D Sela	6	6
