= 2015 Amex-Istanbul Challenger – Doubles =

Doubles
- 2015 Amex-Istanbul Challenger

Final
- Champions: (Russia) Andrey Kuznetsov (Kazakhstan) Aleksandr Nedovyesov
- Runners-up: (Georgia (country)) Aleksandre Metreveli (Russia) Anton Zaitcev
- Score: 6–2, 5–7, [10–8]

Events
Singles	Doubles
← 2014 ·	Amex-Istanbul Challenger	· 2016 →

Colin Fleming and Jonathan Marray lost their title to Andrey Kuznetsov and Aleksandr Nedovyesov.

== Seeds ==
1. (Philippines) Ruben Gonzales / (Sweden) Andreas Siljeström (first round)
2. (Russia) Andrey Kuznetsov / (Kazakhstan) Aleksandr Nedovyesov (champions)
3. (Uruguay) Ariel Behar / (Spain) Adrián Menéndez-Maceiras (semifinals)
4. (Russia) Aslan Karatsev / (Belarus) Andrei Vasilevski (semifinals)

== Draw ==
=== Key ===
- Q = Qualifier
- WC = Wild card
- LL = Lucky loser
- Alt = Alternate
- SE = Special exempt
- PR = Protected ranking
- ITF = ITF entry
- JE = Junior exempt
- w/o = Walkover
- r = Retired
- d = Defaulted
- SR = Special ranking

First round
1	(Philippines) R Gonzales (Sweden) A Siljeström	5	3
(Germany) N Langer (Germany) D Masur	7	6
(Georgia (country)) A Metreveli (Russia) A Zaitcev	3	6	[10]
(Turkey) T Altuna (Turkey) C İlkel	6	1	[3]
4	(Russia) A Karatsev (Belarus) A Vasilevski	7^{8}	6
(Italy) M Bortolotti (Italy) Erik Crepaldi	6^{6}	4
(Russia) K Khachanov (Sweden) E Ymer	5	4
(Turkey) B Ergüden (Turkey) A Yüksel	7	6
WC	(Serbia) Ivan Bjelica (Turkey) MN Türker	6	1	[14]
(Belgium) Y Mertens (France) V Millot	1	6	[12]
WC	(Turkey) Gokberk Ergeneman (Turkey) Barkin Yalcinkale	5	3
3	(Uruguay) A Behar (Spain) A Menéndez-Maceiras	7	6
WC	(Brazil) Gustavo Guerses (Turkey) Berk Iliescu	1	6^{3}
(Moldova) R Albot (Belarus) I Ivashka	6	7^{7}
(Bosnia and Herzegovina) M Bašić (Bosnia and Herzegovina) A Šetkić	6^{2}	6^{5}
2	(Russia) A Kuznetsov (Kazakhstan) A Nedovyesov	7^{7}	7^{7}

Quarterfinals
(Germany) N Langer (Germany) D Masur	5	1
(Georgia (country)) A Metreveli (Russia) A Zaitcev	7	6
4	(Russia) A Karatsev (Belarus) A Vasilevski	6	6^{6}	[10]
(Turkey) B Ergüden (Turkey) A Yüksel	4	7^{8}	[4]
WC	(Serbia) I Bjelica (Turkey) MN Türker	6	3	[6]
3	(Uruguay) A Behar (Spain) A Menéndez-Maceiras	3	6	[10]
(Moldova) R Albot (Belarus) I Ivashka	6	2	[3]
2	(Russia) A Kuznetsov (Kazakhstan) A Nedovyesov	3	6	[10]

Semifinals
(Georgia (country)) A Metreveli (Russia) A Zaitcev	6	6^{5}	[12]
4	(Russia) A Karatsev (Belarus) A Vasilevski	1	7^{7}	[10]
3	(Uruguay) A Behar (Spain) A Menéndez-Maceiras	1	2
2	(Russia) A Kuznetsov (Kazakhstan) A Nedovyesov	6	6

Final
(Georgia (country)) A Metreveli (Russia) A Zaitcev	2	7	[8]
2	(Russia) A Kuznetsov (Kazakhstan) A Nedovyesov	6	5	[10]
