= 2009 BMW Tennis Championship =

- Date: March 16 – March 22
- Edition: 6th
- Location: Sunrise, Florida, United States

Champions

Singles
- (Sweden) Robin Söderling

Doubles
- (United States) Eric Butorac / (United States) Bobby Reynolds
← 2008 ·	BMW Tennis Championship	· 2010 →

The 2009 BMW Tennis Championship was a professional men's tennis tournament played on outdoor hard courts. It was part of the 2009 ATP Challenger Tour. It took place in Sunrise, Florida, United States between 16 and 22 March 2009.

== Singles entrants ==
=== Seeds ===
Nationality	Player	Ranking*	Seeding
CZE	Tomáš Berdych	22	1
GER	Rainer Schüttler	30	2
ESP	Feliciano López	34	3
RUS	Igor Kunitsyn	38	4
ITA	Simone Bolelli	40	5
ARG	José Acasuso	42	6
SRB	Janko Tipsarević	46	7
FRA	Florent Serra	50	8

- Rankings are as of March 9, 2009.

=== Other entrants ===
The following players received wildcards into the singles main draw:

- (Czech Republic) Tomáš Berdych
- (Sweden) Thomas Johansson
- (Austria) Stefan Koubek
- (United States) Wayne Odesnik

The following players received entry from the qualifying draw:

- (Germany) Denis Gremelmayr
- (Russia) Evgeny Korolev
- (Germany) Björn Phau
- (Sweden) Robin Söderling

== Champions ==
=== Men's singles ===
(Sweden) Robin Söderling def. (Czech Republic) Tomáš Berdych, 6–1, 6–1

=== Men's doubles ===
(United States) Eric Butorac / (United States) Bobby Reynolds def. (South Africa) Jeff Coetzee / (Australia) Jordan Kerr, 5–7, 6–4, 10–4
