= 2016 Amex-Istanbul Challenger =

- Date: 12–18 September
- Edition: 29th
- Surface: Hard
- Location: Istanbul, Turkey

Champions

Singles
- (Tunisia) Malek Jaziri

Doubles
- (France) Sadio Doumbia / (France) Calvin Hemery
← 2015 ·	Amex-Istanbul Challenger	· 2017 →

The 2016 Amex-Istanbul Challenger was a professional tennis tournament played on hard courts. It was the 29th edition of the tournament which was part of the 2016 ATP Challenger Tour. It took place in Istanbul, Turkey between 12 and 18 September 2016.

== Singles main-draw entrants ==
=== Seeds ===
Country	Player	Rank^{1}	Seed
TUN	Malek Jaziri	68	1
ISR	Dudi Sela	80	2
GER	Tobias Kamke	136	3
SUI	Marco Chiudinelli	144	4
ROU	Marius Copil	173	5
ESP	Adrián Menéndez Maceiras	207	6
BIH	Aldin Šetkić	211	7
SRB	Nikola Milojević	214	8

- ^{1} Rankings are as of August 29, 2016.

=== Other entrants ===
The following players received wildcards into the singles main draw:

- (Turkey) Muhammet Haylaz
- (Turkey) Altuğ Çelikbilek
- (Turkey) Anıl Yüksel
- (Turkey) Barkın Yalçinkale

The following players received entry into the singles main draw with a protected ranking:

- (Russia) Denis Matsukevich

The following players received entry from the qualifying draw:

- (Russia) Vitaly Kozyukov
- (Turkey) Cem İlkel
- (Spain) José Francisco Vidal Azorín
- (Colombia) Daniel Elahi Galán

== Champions ==
=== Singles ===
- (Tunisia) Malek Jaziri def. (Israel) Dudi Sela, 1–6, 6–1, 6–0.

=== Doubles ===
- (France) Sadio Doumbia / (France) Calvin Hemery def. (Switzerland) Marco Chiudinelli / (Romania) Marius Copil, 6–4, 6–3.
