= 2017 Amex-Istanbul Challenger =

- Date: 11–17 September
- Edition: 30th
- Surface: Hard
- Location: Istanbul, Turkey

Champions

Singles
- (Tunisia) Malek Jaziri

Doubles
- (Germany) Andre Begemann / (France) Jonathan Eysseric
← 2016 ·	Amex-Istanbul Challenger	· 2018 →

The 2017 Amex-Istanbul Challenger was a professional tennis tournament played on hard courts. It was the 30th edition of the tournament which was part of the 2017 ATP Challenger Tour. It took place in Istanbul, Turkey between 11 and 17 September 2017.

== Singles main-draw entrants ==
=== Seeds ===
Country	Player	Rank^{1}	Seed
TUN	Malek Jaziri	80	1
UZB	Denis Istomin	86	2
ROU	Marius Copil	87	3
RUS	Evgeny Donskoy	99	4
KAZ	Alexander Bublik	104	5
ITA	Matteo Berrettini	139	6
~~ITA~~	~~Luca Vanni~~	~~152~~	~~7~~
GRE	Stefanos Tsitsipas	161	8

- ^{1} Rankings are as of 28 August 2017.

=== Other entrants ===
The following players received wildcards into the singles main draw:

- (Turkey) Altuğ Çelikbilek
- (Turkey) Muhammet Haylaz
- (Turkey) Mert Naci Türker
- (Turkey) Anıl Yüksel

The following players received entry from the qualifying draw:

- (Germany) Robin Kern
- (Belgium) Yannick Mertens
- (Russia) Roman Safiullin
- (Germany) Marc Sieber

The following player received entry as a lucky loser:

- (Russia) Shalva Dzhanashia

== Champions ==
=== Singles ===
- (Tunisia) Malek Jaziri def. (Italy) Matteo Berrettini 7–6^{(7–4)}, 0–6, 7–5.

=== Doubles ===
- (Germany) Andre Begemann / (France) Jonathan Eysseric def. (Monaco) Romain Arneodo / (France) Hugo Nys 6–3, 5–7, [10–4].
