= 2015 Amex-Istanbul Challenger =

- Date: 14–20 September
- Edition: 28th
- Surface: Hard
- Location: Istanbul, Turkey

Champions

Singles
- (Russia) Karen Khachanov

Doubles
- (Russia) Andrey Kuznetsov / (Kazakhstan) Aleksandr Nedovyesov
| ← 2014 · | Amex-Istanbul Challenger | · 2016 → |

The 2015 Amex-Istanbul Challenger was a professional tennis tournament played on hard courts. It was the 28th edition of the tournament which was part of the 2015 ATP Challenger Tour. It took place in Istanbul, Turkey between 14 and 20 September 2015.

== Singles main-draw entrants ==
=== Seeds ===
| Country | Player | Rank^{1} | Seed |
|---|---|---|---|
| UKR | Sergiy Stakhovsky | 60 | 1 |
| TUR | Marsel İlhan | 84 | 2 |
| MDA | Radu Albot | 86 | 3 |
| RUS | Andrey Kuznetsov | 90 | 4 |
| KAZ | Aleksandr Nedovyesov | 100 | 5 |
| ESP | Adrián Menéndez Maceiras | 134 | 6 |
| SWE | Elias Ymer | 144 | 7 |
| BIH | Mirza Bašić | 150 | 8 |

- ^{1} Rankings are as of September 7, 2015.

=== Other entrants ===
The following players received wildcards into the singles main draw:

- (Turkey) Barış Ergüden
- (Ukraine) Sergiy Stakhovsky
- (Turkey) Barkın Yalçınkale
- (Turkey) Anıl Yüksel

The following players received entry from the qualifying draw:

- (Belarus) Ilya Ivashka
- (Russia) Mikhail Ledovskikh
- (Germany) Daniel Masur
- (Belarus) Andrei Vasilevski

The following players received entry as a lucky loser:

- (Sweden) Markus Eriksson

== Champions ==
=== Singles ===
- (Russia) Karen Khachanov def. (Ukraine) Sergiy Stakhovsky 4–6, 6–4, 6–3

=== Doubles ===
- (Russia) Andrey Kuznetsov / (Kazakhstan) Aleksandr Nedovyesov def. (Georgia (country)) Aleksandre Metreveli / (Russia) Anton Zaitcev 6–2, 5–7, [10–8]
