= 2025 Istanbul Challenger =

- Date: 1–7 September
- Edition: 39th
- Surface: Hard
- Location: Istanbul, Turkey

Champions

Singles
- (Slovakia) Alex Molčan

Doubles
- (Slovakia) Miloš Karol / (Germany) Daniel Masur
← 2024 ·	Istanbul Challenger	· 2026 →

The 2025 QNB Istanbul Challenger 77. TED Open was a professional tennis tournament played on hardcourts. It was the 39th edition of the tournament which was part of the 2025 ATP Challenger Tour. It took place in Istanbul, Turkey between 1 and 7 September 2025.

== Singles main-draw entrants ==
=== Seeds ===
Country	Player	Rank^{1}	Seed
SVK	Lukáš Klein	119	1
FIN	Otto Virtanen	123	2
ESP	Martín Landaluce	138	3
~~FRA~~	~~Harold Mayot~~	~~152~~	~~4~~
TUN	Moez Echargui	165	5
FRA	Calvin Hemery	185	6
FRA	Hugo Grenier	188	7
LBN	Benjamin Hassan	200	8
MEX	Rodrigo Pacheco Méndez	224	9

- ^{1} Rankings are as of 25 August 2025.

=== Other entrants ===
The following players received wildcards into the singles main draw:

- (Turkey) Kaya Arınç
- (Turkey) Koray Kırcı
- (Turkey) Mert Naci Türker

The following player received entry into the singles main draw using a protected ranking:

- Ilya Ivashka

The following players received entry into the singles main draw as alternates:

- (United Kingdom) Alastair Gray
- (Slovakia) Miloš Karol
- (Slovakia) Alex Molčan
- (Germany) Mats Rosenkranz

The following players received entry from the qualifying draw:

- (Mexico) Alex Hernández
- (Slovakia) Michal Krajčí
- (Hungary) Péter Makk
- Ivan Nedelko
- (Italy) Luca Potenza
- (Ukraine) Vadym Ursu

== Champions ==
=== Singles ===
- (Slovakia) Alex Molčan def. (Colombia) Nicolás Mejía 7–6^{(11–9)}, 6–2.

=== Doubles ===
- (Slovakia) Miloš Karol / (Germany) Daniel Masur def. (Greece) Stefanos Sakellaridis / (India) Karan Singh 7–6^{(7–2)}, 6–1.
