= 2010 BMW Tennis Championship =

- Date: March 16 – March 21
- Edition: 7th
- Location: Sunrise, Florida, United States

Champions

Singles
- (Germany) Florian Mayer

Doubles
- (Czech Republic) Martin Damm / (Slovakia) Filip Polášek
← 2009 ·	BMW Tennis Championship	· 2011 →

The 2010 BMW Tennis Championship was a professional tennis tournament played on outdoor hard courts. It was part of the 2010 ATP Challenger Tour. It took place in Sunrise, Florida, United States between 16 and 21 March 2010.

== ATP entrants ==
=== Seeds ===
Nationality	Player	Ranking	Seeding
CZE	Radek Štěpánek	17	1
FRA	Gilles Simon	21	2
GER	Benjamin Becker	39	3
FRA	Jérémy Chardy	44	4
ITA	Andreas Seppi	46	5
GER	Andreas Beck	48	6
GER	Michael Berrer	51	7
GER	Florian Mayer	53	8

- Rankings are as of March 8, 2010.

=== Other entrants ===
The following players received wildcards into the singles main draw:

- (Austria) Stefan Koubek
- (France) Sébastien Grosjean
- (United States) Ryan Harrison
- (Czech Republic) Radek Štěpánek

The following players received entry from the qualifying draw:

- (United States) Kevin Kim
- (Israel) Harel Levy
- (Germany) Björn Phau
- (United States) Bobby Reynolds

== Champions ==
=== Singles ===
(Germany) Florian Mayer def. (France) Gilles Simon, 6–4, 6–4

=== Doubles ===
(Czech Republic) Martin Damm / (Slovakia) Filip Polášek def. (Czech Republic) Lukáš Dlouhý / (India) Leander Paes, 4–6, 6–1, [13–11]
