= 2014 Amex-Istanbul Challenger =

- Date: 8–14 September 2014
- Edition: 27th
- Surface: Hard
- Location: Istanbul, Turkey

Champions

Singles
- (France) Adrian Mannarino

Doubles
- (United Kingdom) Colin Fleming / (United Kingdom) Jonathan Marray
← 2013 ·	Amex-Istanbul Challenger	· 2015 →

The 2014 Amex-Istanbul Challenger was a professional tennis tournament played on hard courts. It was the 27th edition of the tournament which was part of the 2014 ATP Challenger Tour. It took place in Istanbul, Turkey between 8 and 14 September 2014.

== Singles main-draw entrants ==
=== Seeds ===
Country	Player	Rank^{1}	Seed
GER	Tobias Kamke	73	1
TUN	Malek Jaziri	88	2
FRA	Adrian Mannarino	89	3
JPN	Tatsuma Ito	126	4
JPN	Yūichi Sugita	128	5
GBR	James Ward	131	6
TPE	Jimmy Wang	132	7
TUR	Marsel İlhan	144	8

- ^{1} Rankings are as of September 1, 2014.

=== Other entrants ===
The following players received wildcards into the singles main draw:

- (Turkey) Barış Ergüden
- (Turkey) Cem İlkel
- (Turkey) Barkın Yalçınkale
- (Turkey) Anıl Yüksel

The following players received entry from the qualifying draw:

- (Colombia) Juan Sebastián Gómez
- (France) Yannick Jankovits
- (Bulgaria) Dimitar Kuzmanov
- (Georgia (country)) Aleksandre Metreveli

== Champions ==
=== Singles ===
- (France) Adrian Mannarino def. (Japan) Tatsuma Ito, 6–0, 2–0, ret.

=== Doubles ===
- (United Kingdom) Colin Fleming / (United Kingdom) Jonathan Marray def. (Australia) Jordan Kerr / (France) Fabrice Martin, 6–4, 2–6, [10–8]
