= 2011 American Express – TED Open =

- Date: 12–18 September
- Edition: 24th
- Location: Istanbul, Turkey

Champions

Singles
- (Uzbekistan) Denis Istomin

Doubles
- (Australia) Carsten Ball / (Germany) Andre Begemann
| ← 2010 · | American Express – TED Open | · 2012 → |

The 2011 American Express – TED open was a professional tennis tournament played on hard courts. It was the 24th edition of the tournament which was part of the 2011 ATP Challenger Tour. It took place in Istanbul, Turkey between 12 and 18 September 2011.

== ATP entrants ==
=== Seeds ===
| Country | Player | Rank^{1} | Seed |
|---|---|---|---|
| GER | Philipp Kohlschreiber | 47 | 1 |
| KAZ | Mikhail Kukushkin | 61 | 2 |
| GER | Matthias Bachinger | 86 | 3 |
| GER | Tobias Kamke | 92 | 4 |
| UZB | Denis Istomin | 95 | 5 |
| TUR | Marsel İlhan | 101 | 6 |
| FRA | Édouard Roger-Vasselin | 110 | 7 |
| RUS | Teymuraz Gabashvili | 128 | 8 |

- ^{1} Rankings are as of August 29, 2011.

=== Other entrants ===
The following players received wildcards into the singles main draw:

- (Turkey) Haluk Akkoyun
- (Slovakia) Filip Horanský
- (Germany) Philipp Kohlschreiber
- (Turkey) Efe Yurtacan

The following players received entry as an alternate into the singles main draw:

- (Russia) Evgeny Kirillov

The following players received entry from the qualifying draw:

- (Romania) Teodor-Dacian Crăciun
- (Bulgaria) Dimitar Kutrovsky
- (Russia) Mikhail Ledovskikh (Lucky loser)
- (Republic of Ireland) James McGee
- (Germany) Simon Stadler

== Champions ==
=== Singles ===
(Uzbekistan) Denis Istomin def. (Germany) Philipp Kohlschreiber, 7–6^{(8–6)}, 6–4

=== Doubles ===
(Australia) Carsten Ball / (Germany) Andre Begemann def. (France) Grégoire Burquier / (Belgium) Yannick Mertens, 6–2, 6–4
