= 2013 American Express – TED Open =

- Date: 9–15 September
- Edition: 26th
- Surface: Hard
- Location: Istanbul, Turkey

Champions

Singles
- (Kazakhstan) Mikhail Kukushkin

Doubles
- (United Kingdom) Jamie Delgado / (Australia) Jordan Kerr
← 2012 ·	American Express – TED Open	· 2014 →

The 2013 American Express – TED Open was a professional tennis tournament played on hard courts. It was the 26th edition of the tournament which was part of the 2013 ATP Challenger Tour. It took place in Istanbul, Turkey between 9 and 15 September 2013.

== Singles main-draw entrants ==
=== Seeds ===
Country	Player	Rank^{1}	Seed
ESP	Guillermo García López	74	1
IND	Somdev Devvarman	114	2
ITA	Matteo Viola	138	3
UKR	Illya Marchenko	145	4
GER	Peter Gojowczyk	146	5
ITA	Flavio Cipolla	158	6
ESP	Daniel Muñoz de la Nava	159	7
GER	Philipp Petzschner	163	8

- ^{1} Rankings are as of August 26, 2013.

=== Other entrants ===
The following players received wildcards into the singles main draw:

- (Turkey) Tuna Altuna
- (Turkey) Barış Ergüden
- (Germany) Peter Gojowczyk
- (Turkey) Anıl Yüksel

The following players received entry into the singles main draw as an alternate:

- (Georgia (country)) Nikoloz Basilashvili

The following players received entry from the qualifying draw:

- (United Kingdom) David Rice
- (United Kingdom) Joshua Milton
- (Belarus) Egor Gerasimov
- (Russia) Denis Matsukevich

== Champions ==
=== Singles ===
- (Kazakhstan) Mikhail Kukushkin def. (Ukraine) Illya Marchenko, 6–3, 6–3

=== Doubles ===
- (United Kingdom) Jamie Delgado / (Australia) Jordan Kerr def. (Republic of Ireland) James Cluskey / (Spain) Adrián Menéndez Maceiras, 6–3, 6–2
