= BMW Tennis Championship =

Defunct tennis tournament
- Event name: Sunrise
- Founded: 2004
- Abolished: 2010
- Editions: 7
- Location: Sunrise, Florida, United States
- Venue: Sunrise Tennis Club
- Category: ATP Challenger Tour
- Surface: Hard
- Draw: 32S/32Q/16D
- Prize money: $125,000
- Website: www.sunrisetennis.com

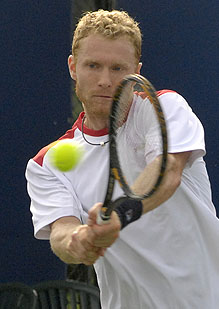
Russian Dmitry Tursunov won the singles in Sunrise in 2006, and reached two doubles finals, winning in 2004 (w/ Andreev), losing in 2006 (w/ Dragicevic)

The BMW Tennis Championship was a professional tennis tournament played on outdoor hard courts. It was part of the ATP Challenger Tour. It was held annually at the Sunrise Tennis Club in Sunrise, Florida, United States, from 2004 until 2010. It was initially known as the Pro Tennis World Open, changing its name for the 2006 tournament. In 2012 it was replaced with the Dallas Tennis Classic.

== Past finals ==
=== Singles ===
Year	Champion	Runner-up	Score
2010	(Germany) Florian Mayer	(France) Gilles Simon	6–4, 6–4
2009	(Sweden) Robin Söderling	(Czech Republic) Tomáš Berdych	6–1, 6–1
2008	(Netherlands) Robin Haase	(France) Sébastien Grosjean	5–7, 7–5, 6–1
2007	(France) Gaël Monfils	(Italy) Andreas Seppi	6–3, 1–6, 6–1
2006	(Russia) Dmitry Tursunov	(Spain) Alberto Martín	6–3, 6–1
2005	(Slovakia) Karol Beck	(Italy) Davide Sanguinetti	6–2, 6–2
2004	(Austria) Jürgen Melzer	(Sweden) Thomas Enqvist	6–3, 4–6, 6–3

=== Doubles ===
Year	Champions	Runners-up	Score
2010	(Czech Republic) Martin Damm (Slovakia) Filip Polášek	(Czech Republic) Lukáš Dlouhý (India) Leander Paes	4–6, 6–1, [13–11]
2009	(United States) Eric Butorac (United States) Bobby Reynolds	(South Africa) Jeff Coetzee (Australia) Jordan Kerr	5–7, 6–4, 10–4
2008	(Serbia) Janko Tipsarević (Serbia) Dušan Vemić	(Belgium) Kristof Vliegen (Netherlands) Peter Wessels	6–2, 7–6(6)
2007	(Greece) Konstantinos Economidis (Belgium) Kristof Vliegen	(Argentina) Juan Martín del Potro (Argentina) Sebastián Prieto	6–3, 6–4
2006	(Czech Republic) Petr Pála (Czech Republic) Robin Vik	(United States) Goran Dragicevic (Russia) Dmitry Tursunov	6–4, 6–2
2005	(United States) Rick Leach (United States) Travis Parrott	(United States) Jan-Michael Gambill (Australia) Mark Philippoussis	walkover
2004	(Russia) Igor Andreev (Russia) Dmitry Tursunov	(Denmark) Kenneth Carlsen (Sweden) Thomas Enqvist	6–3, 6–7(3), 7–5
