= 2012 American Express – TED Open =

- Date: 10–16 September
- Edition: 25th
- Surface: Hard
- Location: Istanbul, Turkey

Champions

Singles
- (Russia) Dmitry Tursunov

Doubles
- (Slovakia) Karol Beck / (Czech Republic) Lukáš Dlouhý
← 2011 ·	American Express – TED Open	· 2013 →

The 2012 American Express – TED Open was a professional tennis tournament played on hard courts. It was the 25th edition of the tournament which was part of the 2012 ATP Challenger Tour. It took place in Istanbul, Turkey between 10 and 16 September 2012.

== Singles main-draw entrants ==
=== Seeds ===
Country	Player	Rank^{1}	Seed
TUN	Malek Jaziri	89	1
USA	Rajeev Ram	95	2
SVN	Grega Žemlja	99	3
USA	Michael Russell	107	4
GER	Matthias Bachinger	115	5
RUS	Igor Kunitsyn	126	6
SVK	Karol Beck	143	7
RUS	Dmitry Tursunov	144	8

- ^{1} Rankings are as of August 27, 2012.

=== Other entrants ===
The following players received wildcards into the singles main draw:

- (Turkey) Haluk Akkoyun
- (Turkey) Durukan Durmus
- (Turkey) Baris Erguden
- (Turkey) Efe Yurtacan

The following players received entry from the qualifying draw:

- (Germany) Maximilian Abel
- (United Kingdom) Lewis Burton
- (Italy) Riccardo Ghedin
- (Republic of Ireland) James McGee

== Champions ==
=== Singles ===
- (Russia) Dmitry Tursunov def. (France) Adrian Mannarino, 6–4, 7–6^{(7–5)}

=== Doubles ===
- (Slovakia) Karol Beck / (Czech Republic) Lukáš Dlouhý def. (Spain) Adrián Menéndez / (Australia) John Peers, 3–6, 6–2, [10–6]
