= Jordan Kerr =

Australian tennis player

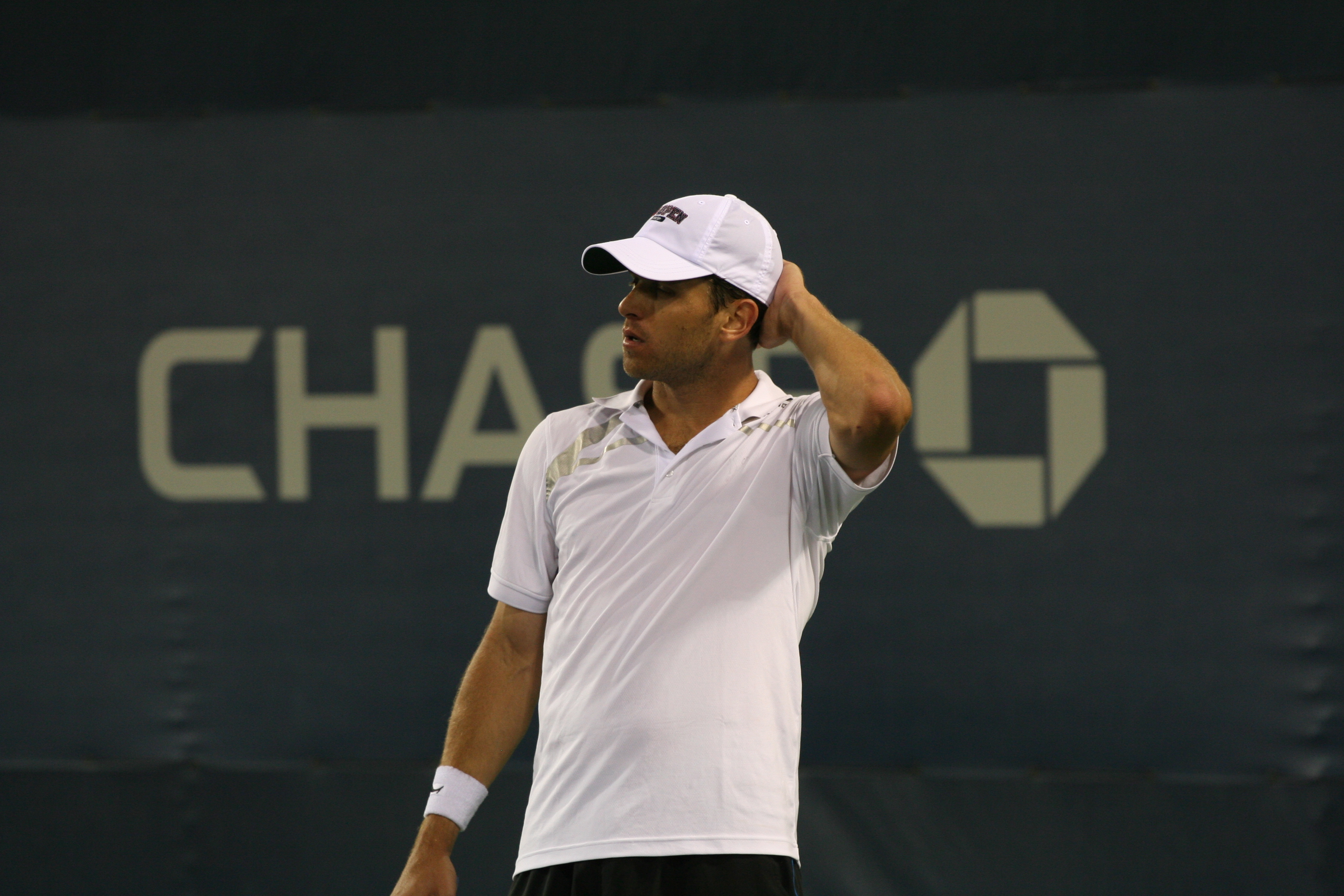
- Country (sports): Australia
- Residence: Adelaide, Australia
- Born: 26 October 1979 (age 46) Adelaide, Australia
- Height: 1.80 m (5 ft 11 in)
- Turned pro: 1998
- Plays: Right-handed (two-handed backhand)
- Prize money: USD $1,071,373

Singles
- Career record: 0–0
- Career titles: 0
- Highest ranking: No. 356 (7 August 2000)

Grand Slam singles results
- Australian Open: Q3 (1998)

Doubles
- Career record: 188–226 (Grand Slam, ATP Tour level, and Davis Cup)
- Career titles: 9 ATP World Tour Titles; 20 ATP Challenger, 12 ITF Futures
- Highest ranking: No. 23 (18 August 2008)

Grand Slam doubles results
- Australian Open: R16 (2006, 2007, 2009)
- French Open: 2R (2002, 2004, 2007, 2008, 2012)
- Wimbledon: R16 (2008)
- US Open: R16 (2002, 2007)

Grand Slam mixed doubles results
- Australian Open: 1R (2004, 2008, 2009, 2010)
- French Open: QF (2008)
- Wimbledon: SF (2003)
- US Open: 2R (2008)
- Last updated on: 5 July 2021.

Jordan Kerr, born 26 October 1979 in Adelaide South Australia, turned professional in 1998 and retired in 2014.

Kerr's 17yr career saw him compete in 44 Grand Slams, win 9 ATP Titles and remain ranked in the World's Top 100 in doubles for 10 consecutive years (2001-2010).

In 2008 he represented Australia at the Beijing Olympic Games (partnering Paul Hanley), in a team that featured Lleyton Hewitt, Chris Guccione, Alicia Molik, Sam Stosur and Casey Dellacqua. In the same season Kerr became Australia's No.1 doubles player.

Kerr's most successful doubles partnership came alongside American Jim Thomas, winning 4 ATP World Tour Titles together. 3 of those were at the Newport Hall Of Fame Championship (Rhode Island USA), the final grass tournament of the season following Wimbledon. Kerr won the event a record 5 times.

Jordan's best Grand Slam singles result came at the 1998 Australian Open, age 19, losing final round qualifying 6-4 4-6 6-8 to American Brian MacPhie.

== 2012/2013 ==
Kerr was drafted by Billie Jean King’s Philadelphia Freedoms for World Team Tennis in the summer of 2012 & 2013. The Freedoms competed in 14 matches, including seven home matches played at The Pavilion at Villanova University.

== ATP career finals ==
=== Doubles: 15 (9 titles, 6 runner-ups) ===
Legend (doubles) Grand Slam (0–0) ATP World Tour Finals (0–0) ATP Masters Series (0–0) ATP Championship Series (1–2) ATP International Series (8–4)	Finals by surface Hard (3–5) Clay (1–1) Grass (5–0) Carpet (0–0)	Finals by setting Outdoor (8–5) Indoor (1–1)

Result	W–L	Date	Tournament	Tier	Surface	Partner	Opponents	Score
Win	1–0	Jul 2003	Newport, United States	International Series	Grass	(Australia) David Macpherson	(Austria) Julian Knowle (Austria) Jürgen Melzer	7–6^{(7–4)}, 6–3
Win	2–0	Jul 2004	Newport, United States	International Series	Grass	(United States) Jim Thomas	(France) Grégory Carraz (France) Nicolas Mahut	6–3, 6–7^{(5–7)}, 6–3
Win	3–0	Jul 2004	Indianapolis, United States	International Series	Hard	(United States) Jim Thomas	(Zimbabwe) Wayne Black (Zimbabwe) Kevin Ullyett	6–7^{(7–9)}, 7–6^{(7–3)}, 6–3
Loss	3–1	Feb 2005	Delray Beach, United States	International Series	Hard	(United States) Jim Thomas	(Sweden) Simon Aspelin (Australia) Todd Perry	3–6, 3–6
Win	4–1	Jul 2005	Newport, United States	International Series	Grass	(United States) Jim Thomas	(United States) Graydon Oliver (United States) Travis Parrott	7–6^{(7–5)}, 7–6^{(7–5)}
Win	5–1	Apr 2007	Casablanca, Morocco	International Series	Clay	(Czech Republic) David Škoch	(Poland) Łukasz Kubot (Austria) Oliver Marach	7–6^{(7–4)}, 1–6, [10–4]
Win	6–1	Jul 2007	Newport, United States	International Series	Grass	(United States) Jim Thomas	(Australia) Nathan Healey (Russia) Igor Kunitsyn	6–3, 7–5
Win	7–1	Oct 2007	Tokyo, Japan	Championship Series	Hard	(Sweden) Robert Lindstedt	(Canada) Frank Dancevic (Australia) Stephen Huss	6–4, 6–4
Win	8–1	Mar 2008	Zagreb, Croatia	International Series	Hard	(Australia) Paul Hanley	(Germany) Christopher Kas (Netherlands) Rogier Wassen	6–3, 3–6, [10–8]
Loss	8–2	May 2009	Munich, Germany	ATP 250 Series	Clay	(Australia) Ashley Fisher	(Czech Republic) Jan Hernych (Czech Republic) Ivo Minář	4–6, 4–6
Win	9–2	Jul 2009	Newport, United States	ATP 250 Series	Grass	(United States) Rajeev Ram	(Germany) Michael Kohlmann (Netherlands) Rogier Wassen	6–7^{(6–8)}, 7–6^{(9–7)}, [10–6]
Loss	9–3	Jul 2009	Indianapolis, United States	ATP 250 Series	Hard	(Australia) Ashley Fisher	(Latvia) Ernests Gulbis (Russia) Dmitry Tursunov	4–6, 6–3, [9–11]
Loss	9–4	Oct 2009	Tokyo, Japan	ATP 500 Series	Hard	(United Kingdom) Ross Hutchins	(Austria) Julian Knowle (Austria) Jürgen Melzer	2–6, 7–5, [8–10]
Loss	9–5	Jan 2010	Sydney, Australia	ATP 250 Series	Hard	(United Kingdom) Ross Hutchins	(Canada) Daniel Nestor (Serbia) Nenad Zimonjić	3–6, 6–7^{(5–7)}
Loss	9–6	Feb 2010	Memphis, United States	ATP 500 Series	Hard	(United Kingdom) Ross Hutchins	(United States) John Isner (United States) Sam Querrey	4–6, 4–6

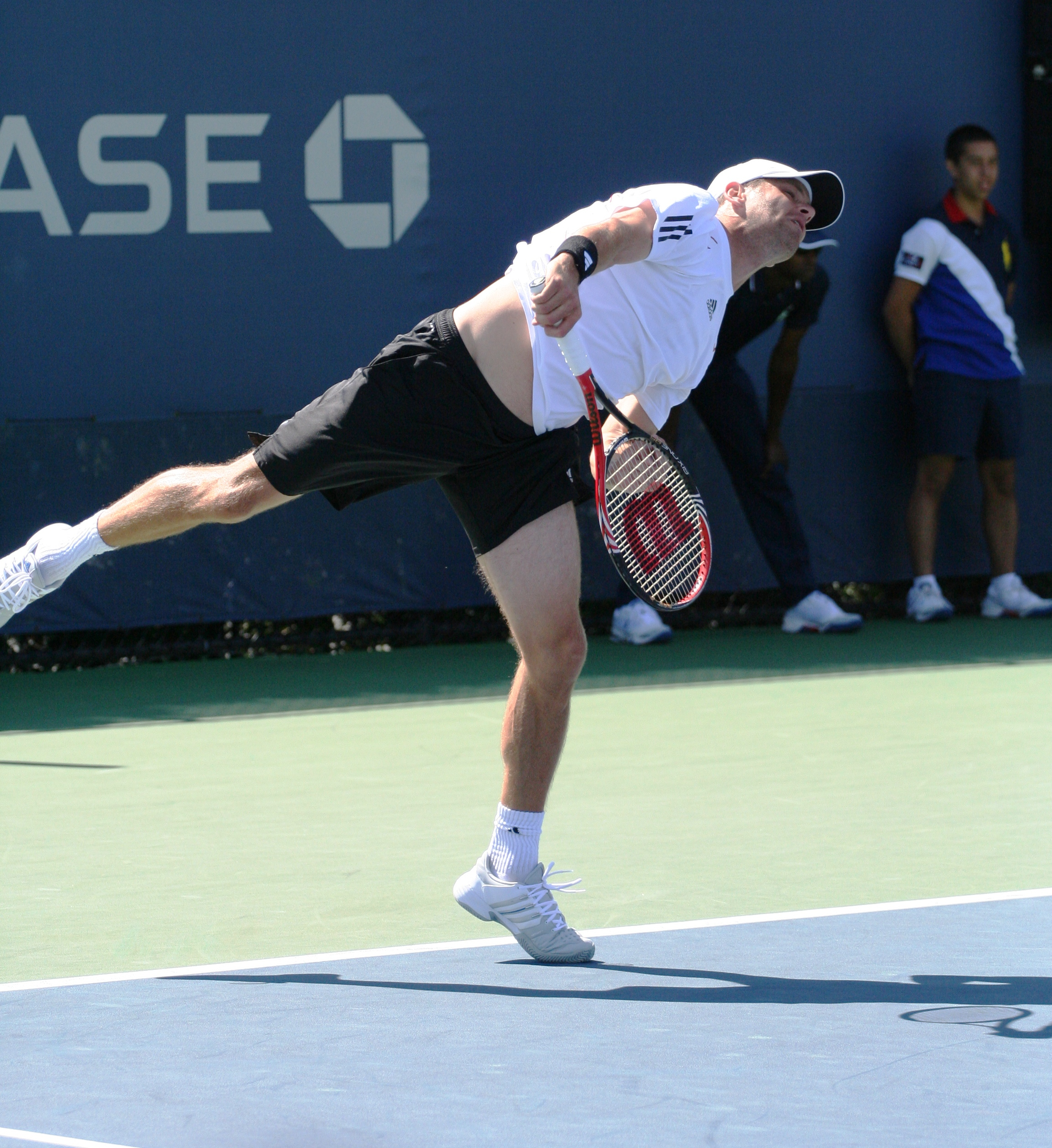
Jordan Kerr at the 2010 US Open

== ATP Challenger and ITF Futures finals ==
=== Singles: 1 (0–1) ===
Legend ATP Challenger (0–0) ITF Futures (0–1)	Finals by surface Hard (0–1) Clay (0–0) Grass (0–0) Carpet (0–0)

Result	W–L	Date	Tournament	Tier	Surface	Opponent	Score
Loss	0–1	Nov 2002	USA F29, Malibu	Futures	Hard	(France) Julien Cassaigne	3–6, 4–6

=== Doubles: 61 (32–29) ===
Legend ATP Challenger (20–26) ITF Futures (12–3)	Finals by surface Hard (11–19) Clay (14–10) Grass (4–0) Carpet (3–0)

Result	W–L	Date	Tournament	Tier	Surface	Partner	Opponents	Score
Win	1–0	Nov 1998	Australia F4, Barmera	Futures	Grass	(Australia) Michael Logarzo	(New Zealand) Alistair Hunt (Australia) Toby Mitchell	6–1, 3–6, 7–5
Loss	1–1	Apr 1999	New Zealand F1, Tauranga	Futures	Hard	(Australia) Michael Logarzo	(Australia) Luke Bourgeois (Australia) Dejan Petrovic	3–6, 5–7
Win	2–1	Jul 1999	Turkey F1, Istanbul	Futures	Hard	(Australia) Toby Mitchell	(Israel) Eyal Erlich (Israel) Kobi Ziv	6–3, 6–2
Win	3–1	Aug 1999	Latvia F1, Jūrmala	Futures	Clay	(Australia) Michael Logarzo	(Finland) Lassi Ketola (Finland) Tero Vilen	6–1, 1–6, 6–0
Win	4–1	Aug 1999	Lithuania F1, Vilnius	Futures	Clay	(Australia) Michael Logarzo	(Belgium) Wim Fissette (Germany) Erik Truempler	6–3, 6–2
Win	5–1	May 2000	Morocco F2, Casablanca	Futures	Clay	(Australia) Ashley Ford	(France) Jean-Michel Pequery (France) Nicolas Thomann	6–3, 6–2
Win	6–1	May 2000	Morocco F3, Agadir	Futures	Clay	(Australia) Ashley Ford	(Spain) Iván Navarro (Spain) Rubén Ramírez Hidalgo	7–6^{(7–3)}, 6–1
Win	7–1	Jun 2000	Ireland F2, Dublin	Futures	Carpet	(South Africa) Damien Roberts	(United Kingdom) Richard Brooks (Switzerland) Jean-Claude Scherrer	6–3, 7–5
Win	8–1	Jul 2000	Turkey F2, Istanbul	Futures	Hard	(France) Cedric Kauffmann	(Australia) Sebastien Swierk (Australia) Josh Tuckfield	6–1, 6–2
Win	9–1	Jul 2000	Bristol, United Kingdom	Challenger	Grass	(South Africa) Damien Roberts	(Israel) Noam Behr (Israel) Eyal Erlich	6–3, 1–6, 6–3
Loss	9–2	Aug 2000	Segovia, Spain	Challenger	Hard	(South Africa) Damien Roberts	(Australia) Ashley Fisher (South Africa) Jason Weir-Smith	6–7^{(5–7)}, 1–6
Win	10–2	Aug 2000	Bressanone, Italy	Challenger	Clay	(South Africa) Damien Roberts	(Argentina) Marcelo Charpentier (Argentina) Diego del Río	7–6^{(7–3)}, 7–5
Win	11–2	Aug 2000	Manerbio, Italy	Challenger	Clay	(South Africa) Damien Roberts	(Portugal) Bernardo Mota (Slovakia) Ladislav Švarc	7–6^{(7–1)}, 6–4
Loss	11–3	Nov 2000	Australia F1, Melbourne	Futures	Hard	(Australia) Paul Hanley	(Australia) Jay Gooding (Australia) David Mcnamara	2–6, 6–3, 4–6
Win	12–3	Mar 2001	New Zealand F1, Ashburton	Futures	Hard	(Australia) Ashley Ford	(South Africa) Andrew Anderson (South Africa) Rik de Voest	6–3, 6–4
Loss	12–4	Mar 2001	Perth, Australia	Challenger	Hard	(Australia) Grant Silcock	(Australia) Stephen Huss (Australia) Lee Pearson	3–6, 6–4, 6–7^{(1–7)}
Loss	12–5	Apr 2001	Uzbekistan F1, Namangan	Futures	Hard	(Finland) Tuomas Ketola	(Uzbekistan) Vadim Kutsenko (Uzbekistan) Oleg Ogorodov	6–7^{(4–7)}, 6–4, 4–6
Win	13–5	May 2001	Uzbekistan F2, Andijan	Futures	Hard	(Finland) Tuomas Ketola	(Russia) Igor Kunitsyn (South Africa) Rik de Voest	5–7, 6–2, 6–1
Loss	13–6	May 2001	Budapest, Hungary	Challenger	Clay	(South Africa) Damien Roberts	(Brazil) Daniel Melo (Argentina) Sergio Roitman	2–6, 4–6
Win	14–6	Jul 2001	Scheveningen, Netherlands	Challenger	Clay	(Australia) Grant Silcock	(United States) Brandon Coupe (Australia) Tim Crichton	6–3, 6–4
Win	15–6	Aug 2001	Córdoba, Spain	Challenger	Hard	(Australia) Grant Silcock	(Spain) Emilio Benfele Álvarez (France) Michaël Llodra	6–3, 5–7, 6–3
Win	16–6	Sep 2001	Kyiv, Ukraine	Challenger	Clay	(Australia) Grant Silcock	(Russia) Kirill Ivanov-Smolensky (Uzbekistan) Vadim Kutsenko	6–1, 7–6^{(7–3)}
Loss	16–7	May 2002	Edinburgh, United Kingdom	Challenger	Clay	(Australia) Grant Silcock	(South Africa) Jeff Coetzee (South Africa) Myles Wakefield	4–6, 6–7^{(6–8)}
Loss	16–8	May 2002	Zagreb, Croatia	Challenger	Clay	(Australia) Grant Silcock	(Belgium) Dick Norman (Belgium) Tom Vanhoudt	3–6, 6–4, 3–6
Win	17–8	Feb 2003	Lübeck, Germany	Challenger	Carpet	(Czech Republic) Ota Fukárek	(Sweden) Robert Lindstedt (Sweden) Fredrik Lovén	6–3, 3–6, 6–3
Win	18–8	Apr 2003	USA F8, Little Rock	Futures	Hard	(Australia) Jay Gooding	(United States) Nick Crowell (United States) Luke Shields	6–3, 6–4
Win	19–8	Apr 2003	León, Mexico	Challenger	Hard	(Czech Republic) Ota Fukárek	(United States) Alex Bogomolov Jr. (Mexico) Alejandro Hernández	4–6, 6–3, 6–4
Loss	19–9	Jun 2003	Biella, Italy	Challenger	Clay	(Belgium) Tom Vanhoudt	(Italy) Stefano Galvani (Argentina) Martín Vassallo Argüello	6–3, 6–7^{(4–6)}, 3–6
Win	20–9	Feb 2004	Dallas, United States	Challenger	Hard	(Australia) Todd Perry	(South Africa) Rik de Voest (United States) Eric Taino	7–5, 6–3
Win	21–9	Apr 2004	Paget, Bermuda	Challenger	Clay	(Belgium) Tom Vanhoudt	(Australia) Ashley Fisher (Australia) Stephen Huss	4–6, 6–3, 7–6^{(8–6)}
Loss	21–10	May 2004	Zagreb, Croatia	Challenger	Clay	(Belgium) Tom Vanhoudt	(Slovakia) Karol Beck (Czech Republic) Jaroslav Levinský	2–6, 6–7^{(4–7)}
Win	22–10	Apr 2005	Paget, Bermuda	Challenger	Clay	(Argentina) Sebastián Prieto	(Czech Republic) Michal Tabara (Czech Republic) Tomáš Zíb	walkover
Win	23–10	May 2005	Prague, Czech Republic	Challenger	Clay	(Argentina) Sebastián Prieto	(United States) Travis Parrott (Netherlands) Rogier Wassen	6–4, 6–3
Win	24–10	Jun 2005	Surbiton, United Kingdom	Challenger	Grass	(United States) Jim Thomas	(United Kingdom) Richard Barker (United Kingdom) William Barker	6–2, 6–4
Win	25–10	Jun 2006	Surbiton, United Kingdom	Challenger	Grass	(United States) Jim Thomas	(Australia) Wayne Arthurs (Australia) Chris Guccione	6–2, 6–4
Loss	25–11	Oct 2006	Mons, Belgium	Challenger	Hard	(Czech Republic) David Škoch	(Switzerland) Jean-Claude Scherrer (Croatia) Lovro Zovko	2–6, 4–6
Loss	25–12	Nov 2006	Bratislava, Slovakia	Challenger	Hard	(United Kingdom) Jamie Murray	(United States) Eric Butorac (United States) Travis Parrott	5–7, 3–6
Win	26–12	Apr 2007	Monza, Italy	Challenger	Clay	(Australia) Nathan Healey	(Brazil) Ricardo Hocevar (Brazil) Alexandre Simoni	6–4, 6–3
Win	27–12	Apr 2007	Marrakech, Morocco	Challenger	Clay	(Czech Republic) Tomáš Cibulec	(Czech Republic) Leoš Friedl (Slovakia) Michal Mertiňák	6–2, 6–4
Win	28–12	May 2007	Prague, Czech Republic	Challenger	Clay	(Czech Republic) Tomáš Cibulec	(Czech Republic) Leoš Friedl (Czech Republic) David Škoch	6–4, 6–2
Loss	28–13	Mar 2009	Sunrise, United States	Challenger	Hard	(South Africa) Jeff Coetzee	(United States) Eric Butorac (United States) Bobby Reynolds	7–5, 4–6, [4–10]
Loss	28–14	Nov 2010	Loughborough, United Kingdom	Challenger	Hard	(United Kingdom) Ken Skupski	(Finland) Henri Kontinen (Denmark) Frederik Nielsen	2–6, 4–6
Loss	28–15	Jul 2011	Winnetka, United States	Challenger	Hard	(United States) Travis Parrott	(Philippines) Treat Huey (United States) Bobby Reynolds	6–7^{(7–9)}, 4–6
Win	29–15	Jul 2011	Lexington, United States	Challenger	Hard	(United States) David Martin	(United Kingdom) James Ward (United States) Michael Yani	6–3, 6–4
Loss	29–16	Aug 2011	Vancouver, Canada	Challenger	Hard	(United States) David Martin	(Philippines) Treat Huey (United States) Travis Parrott	2–6, 6–1, [14–16]
Loss	29–17	Sep 2011	Genoa, Italy	Challenger	Clay	(United States) Travis Parrott	(Germany) Dustin Brown (Argentina) Horacio Zeballos	2–6, 5–7
Loss	29–18	Apr 2012	Le Gosier, Guadeloupe	Challenger	Hard	(Australia) Paul Hanley	(France) Pierre-Hugues Herbert (France) Albano Olivetti	5–7, 6–1, [7–10]
Loss	29–19	Apr 2012	San Luis Potosí, Mexico	Challenger	Clay	(Germany) Andre Begemann	(United States) Nicholas Monroe (Germany) Simon Stadler	6–3, 5–7, [7–10]
Win	30–19	May 2012	Athens, Greece	Challenger	Hard	(Germany) Andre Begemann	(Spain) Gerard Granollers Pujol (Greece) Alexandros Jakupovic	6–2, 6–3
Loss	30–20	Oct 2012	Tiburon, United States	Challenger	Hard	(Sweden) Andreas Siljeström	(South Africa) Rik de Voest (Australia) Chris Guccione	1–6, 4–6
Loss	30–21	Jan 2013	Heilbronn, Germany	Challenger	Hard	(Sweden) Andreas Siljeström	(Sweden) Johan Brunström (South Africa) Raven Klaasen	3–6, 6–0, [10–12]
Loss	30–22	Apr 2013	Mexico City, Mexico	Challenger	Hard	(Australia) John-Patrick Smith	(Australia) Carsten Ball (Australia) Chris Guccione	3–6, 6–3, [9–11]
Loss	30–23	May 2013	Karshi, Uzbekistan	Challenger	Hard	(Russia) Konstantin Kravchuk	(Chinese Taipei) Chen Ti (Spain) Guillermo Olaso	6–7^{(5–7)}, 5–7
Loss	30–24	May 2013	Samarkand, Uzbekistan	Challenger	Clay	(Moldova) Radu Albot	(Uzbekistan) Farrukh Dustov (Ukraine) Oleksandr Nedovyesov	1–6, 6–7^{(7–9)}
Loss	30–25	Jun 2013	Marburg, Germany	Challenger	Clay	(Netherlands) Jesse Huta Galung	(Kazakhstan) Andrey Golubev (Kazakhstan) Evgeny Korolev	3–6, 6–1, [6–10]
Win	31–25	Sep 2013	Istanbul, Turkey	Challenger	Hard	(United Kingdom) Jamie Delgado	(Republic of Ireland) James Cluskey (Spain) Adrián Menéndez Maceiras	6–3, 6–2
Loss	31–26	Sep 2013	Sibiu, Romania	Challenger	Clay	(United Kingdom) Jamie Delgado	(Australia) Rameez Junaid (Austria) Philipp Oswald	4–6, 4–6
Win	32–26	May 2014	Portugal F4, Termas de Monfortinho	Futures	Carpet	(France) Fabrice Martin	(Portugal) Romain Barbosa (Portugal) Frederico Ferreira Silva	6–2, 6–7^{(3–7)}, [10–4]
Loss	32–27	Jun 2014	Nanchang, China	Challenger	Hard	(France) Fabrice Martin	(Chinese Taipei) Chen Ti (Chinese Taipei) Peng Hsien-yin	2–6, 6–3, [10–12]
Loss	32–28	Jul 2014	Granby, Canada	Challenger	Hard	(France) Fabrice Martin	(New Zealand) Marcus Daniell (New Zealand) Artem Sitak	6–7^{(5–7)}, 7–5, [5–10]
Loss	32–29	Sep 2014	Istanbul, Turkey	Challenger	Hard	(France) Fabrice Martin	(United Kingdom) Jonathan Marray (United Kingdom) Colin Fleming	4–6, 6–2, [8–10]

== Performance timelines ==
Key
W	F	SF	QF	#R	RR	Q#	DNQ	A	NH

(W) winner; (F) finalist; (SF) semifinalist; (QF) quarterfinalist; (#R) rounds 4, 3, 2, 1; (RR) round-robin stage; (Q#) qualification round; (DNQ) did not qualify; (A) absent; (NH) not held; (SR) strike rate (events won / competed); (W–L) win–loss record.

=== Doubles ===
Tournament	1998	1999	2000	2001	2002	2003	2004	2005	2006	2007	2008	2009	2010	2011	2012	SR	W–L	Win %
Grand Slam tournaments
Australian Open	1R	A	A	2R	2R	2R	1R	2R	3R	3R	1R	3R	1R	1R	1R	0 / 13	10–13	43%
French Open	A	A	A	1R	2R	1R	2R	1R	1R	2R	2R	1R	1R	A	2R	0 / 11	5–11	31%
Wimbledon	A	A	A	Q2	1R	2R	1R	1R	1R	1R	3R	2R	2R	A	1R	0 / 10	5–10	33%
US Open	A	A	A	Q1	3R	2R	2R	2R	1R	3R	1R	1R	2R	A	1R	0 / 10	8–10	44%
Win–loss	0–1	0–0	0–0	1–2	4–4	3–4	2–4	2–4	2–4	5–4	3–4	3–4	2–4	0–1	1–4	0 / 44	28–44	39%
ATP Tour Masters 1000
Indian Wells	A	A	A	A	A	A	A	2R	A	A	2R	A	1R	A	A	0 / 3	2–3	40%
Miami Open	A	A	A	A	A	A	A	2R	1R	A	1R	QF	1R	A	A	0 / 5	3–5	38%
Monte Carlo	A	A	A	A	A	A	A	A	A	A	1R	2R	A	A	A	0 / 2	0–2	0%
Rome	A	A	A	A	A	A	A	A	A	A	QF	QF	1R	A	A	0 / 3	3–3	50%
Madrid	A	A	A	A	A	A	A	A	A	QF	A	1R	A	A	A	0 / 2	2–2	50%
Hamburg	A	A	A	A	A	A	A	A	A	A	2R	Not Masters Series				0 / 1	1–1	50%
Canada Masters	A	A	A	A	A	A	A	A	A	A	SF	A	A	A	A	0 / 1	3–1	75%
Cincinnati	A	A	A	A	A	A	1R	A	A	A	2R	1R	A	A	A	0 / 3	1–3	25%
Paris Masters	A	A	A	A	A	A	A	A	A	QF	1R	QF	A	A	A	0 / 3	4–3	57%
Win–loss	0–0	0–0	0–0	0–0	0–0	0–0	0–1	2–2	0–1	4–2	8–8	5–6	0–3	0–0	0–0	0 / 23	19–23	45%

=== Mixed doubles ===
Tournament	2002	2003	2004	2005	2006	2007	2008	2009	2010	SR	W–L	Win %
Grand Slam tournaments
Australian Open	A	A	1R	A	A	A	1R	1R	1R	0 / 4	0–4	0%
French Open	A	A	1R	A	A	1R	QF	1R	A	0 / 4	2–4	33%
Wimbledon	1R	SF	A	1R	1R	QF	2R	1R	2R	0 / 8	8–8	50%
US Open	A	A	A	A	A	A	2R	A	A	0 / 1	1–1	50%
Win–loss	0–1	4–1	0–2	0–1	0–1	3–2	3–4	0–3	1–2	0 / 17	11–17	39%
