= Istanbul Challenger =

Istanbul Challenger TED Open
- 2025 Istanbul Challenger

ATP Challenger Tour
- Event name: QNB İstanbul Challenger TED Open
- Location: Istanbul, Turkey
- Venue: TED Tenis Eskrim Dağcılık Spor Kulübü
- Category: ATP Challenger Tour
- Surface: Hard
- Draw: 32S/17Q/16D
- Prize money: $100,000 (2025), $75,000
- Website: Website

The QNB Istanbul Challenger TED Open is a professional tennis tournament played on hardcourts. It is currently part of the ATP Challenger Tour. It is held annually in Istanbul, Turkey since 1946.

== Past finals ==
=== Singles ===
Year	Champion	Runner-up	Score
2026	(United Kingdom) Max Basing	(Japan) Jay Friend	6–3, 1–6, 6–0
2025	(Slovakia) Alex Molčan	(Colombia) Nicolás Mejía	7–6^{(11–9)}, 6–2
2024	(Bosnia and Herzegovina) Damir Džumhur	(Serbia) Hamad Medjedovic	6–4, 6–2
2023	(Bosnia and Herzegovina) Damir Džumhur	(Slovakia) Lukáš Klein	7–6^{(7–5)}, 6–3
2022	(Moldova) Radu Albot	(Czech Republic) Lukáš Rosol	6–2, 6–0
2021 (2)	(Australia) James Duckworth	(Chinese Taipei) Wu Tung-lin	6–4, 6–2
2021 (1)	(France) Arthur Rinderknech	(France) Benjamin Bonzi	4–6, 7–6^{(7–1)}, 7–6^{(7–3)}
2020	(Belarus) Ilya Ivashka	(Slovakia) Martin Kližan	6–1, 6–4
2019	(France) Ugo Humbert	(Uzbekistan) Denis Istomin	6–2, 6–2
2018	(France) Corentin Moutet	(France) Quentin Halys	6–3, 6–4
2017	(Tunisia) Malek Jaziri	(Italy) Matteo Berrettini	7–6^{(7–4)}, 0–6, 7–5
2016	(Tunisia) Malek Jaziri	(Israel) Dudi Sela	1–6, 6–1, 6–0
2015	(Russia) Karen Khachanov	(Ukraine) Sergiy Stakhovsky	4–6, 6–4, 6–3
2014	(France) Adrian Mannarino	(Japan) Tatsuma Ito	6–0, 2–0, ret.
2013	(Kazakhstan) Mikhail Kukushkin	(Ukraine) Illya Marchenko	6–3, 6–3
2012	(Russia) Dmitry Tursunov	(France) Adrian Mannarino	6–4, 7–6^{(7–5)}
2011	(Uzbekistan) Denis Istomin	(Germany) Philipp Kohlschreiber	7–6^{(8–6)}, 6–4
2010	(France) Adrian Mannarino	(Kazakhstan) Mikhail Kukushkin	6–4, 3–6, 6–3
2009	(Ukraine) Illya Marchenko	(Germany) Florian Mayer	6–4, 6–4
2008	(Portugal) Frederico Gil	(Germany) Benedikt Dorsch	6–4, 1–6, 6–3
2007	(Germany) Mischa Zverev	(Slovakia) Lukáš Lacko	6–4, 6–4
2006	(Austria) Alexander Peya	(Croatia) Roko Karanušić	6–7^{(3–7)}, 6–0, 6–3
2005	(Chinese Taipei) Wang Yeu-tzuoo	(Germany) Michael Berrer	4–6, 6–4, 6–3
2004	(Netherlands) Peter Wessels	(Italy) Daniele Bracciali	6–3, 6–2
2003	(Sweden) Robin Söderling	(Switzerland) Michel Kratochvil	7–6^{(7–4)}, 6–2
2002	(Czech Republic) Petr Luxa	(France) Nicolas Thomann	6–3, 6–4
2001	(Russia) Nikolay Davydenko	(France) Cyril Saulnier	6–3, 6–3
2000	(Zimbabwe) Wayne Black	(Czech Republic) Petr Kralert	6–4, 6–3
1999	(Uzbekistan) Vadim Kutsenko	(South Africa) Neville Godwin	6–4, 7–6^{(7–3)}
1998	(Czech Republic) Tomáš Zíb	(Czech Republic) Petr Luxa	4–6, 6–2, 6–1
1997	(France) Jean-Philippe Fleurian	(United Kingdom) Mark Petchey	6–3, 6–1
1996	(Spain) Ignacio Truyol	(France) Jean-Philippe Fleurian	6–2, 6–4
1995	(United Kingdom) Miles Maclagan	(France) Frédéric Vitoux	7–6, 5–7, 6–2
1994	(Germany) Markus Zoecke	(France) Guillaume Raoux	6–7, 6–4, 6–2
1993	(Austria) Alex Antonitsch	(France) Olivier Delaître	6–4, 6–1
1992	(Sweden) Henrik Holm	(France) Stéphane Simian	7–6, 6–2
1991	(France) Olivier Delaître	(Zimbabwe) Byron Black	6–1, 6–4
1990 – 1988	Not held		
1987	(Czechoslovakia) Branislav Stankovič		
1986	(United States) Jim Pugh		
1985	(Romania) Florin Segărceanu		

=== Doubles ===
Year	Champions	Runners-up	Score
2026	(United States) Alafia Ayeni (United States) Keshav Chopra	(Denmark) August Holmgren (Denmark) Carl Emil Overbeck	6–3, 6–7^{(5–7)}, [10–7]
2025	(Slovakia) Miloš Karol (Germany) Daniel Masur	(Greece) Stefanos Sakellaridis (India) Karan Singh	7–6^{(7–2)}, 6–1
2024	(Georgia (country)) Aleksandre Bakshi (Turkey) Yankı Erel	(Denmark) August Holmgren (Denmark) Johannes Ingildsen	7–6^{(7–4)}, 7–5
2023	(United Kingdom) Luke Johnson (Tunisia) Skander Mansouri	(Netherlands) Sander Arends (Pakistan) Aisam-ul-Haq Qureshi	7–6^{(7–3)}, 6–3
2022	(India) Purav Raja (India) Divij Sharan	(India) Arjun Kadhe (Brazil) Fernando Romboli	6–4, 3–6, [10–8]
2021 (2)	(Moldova) Radu Albot (Moldova) Alexander Cozbinov	(Croatia) Antonio Šančić (New Zealand) Artem Sitak	4–6, 7–5, [11–9]
2021 (1)	(Sweden) André Göransson (Netherlands) David Pel	(United Kingdom) Lloyd Glasspool (Finland) Harri Heliövaara	4–6, 6–3, [10–8]
2020	(Uruguay) Ariel Behar (Ecuador) Gonzalo Escobar	(United States) Robert Galloway (United States) Nathaniel Lammons	4–6, 6–3, [10–7]
2019	(Kazakhstan) Andrey Golubev (Kazakhstan) Aleksandr Nedovyesov	(Czech Republic) Marek Gengel (Czech Republic) Lukáš Rosol	Walkover
2018	(Australia) Rameez Junaid (India) Purav Raja	(Kazakhstan) Timur Khabibulin (Ukraine) Vladyslav Manafov	7–6^{(7–4)}, 4–6, [10–7]
2017	(Germany) Andre Begemann (France) Jonathan Eysseric	(Monaco) Romain Arneodo (France) Hugo Nys	6–3, 5–7, [10–4]
2016	(France) Sadio Doumbia (France) Calvin Hemery	(Switzerland) Marco Chiudinelli (Romania) Marius Copil	6–4, 6–3
2015	(Russia) Andrey Kuznetsov (Kazakhstan) Aleksandr Nedovyesov	(Georgia (country)) Aleksandre Metreveli (Russia) Anton Zaitcev	6–2, 5–7, [10–8]
2014	(United Kingdom) Colin Fleming (United Kingdom) Jonathan Marray	(Australia) Jordan Kerr (France) Fabrice Martin	6–4, 2–6, [10–8]
2013	(United Kingdom) Jamie Delgado (Australia) Jordan Kerr	(Republic of Ireland) James Cluskey (Spain) Adrián Menéndez-Maceiras	6–3, 6–2
2012	(Slovakia) Karol Beck (Czech Republic) Lukáš Dlouhý	(Spain) Adrián Menéndez (Australia) John Peers	3–6, 6–2, [10–6]
2011	(Australia) Carsten Ball (Germany) Andre Begemann	(France) Grégoire Burquier (Belgium) Yannick Mertens	6–2, 6–4
2010	(Czech Republic) Leoš Friedl (Serbia) Dušan Vemić	(United States) Brian Battistone (Sweden) Andreas Siljeström	7–6^{(8–6)}, 7–6^{(7–3)}
2009	(Portugal) Frederico Gil (Sweden) Filip Prpic	(Bulgaria) Grigor Dimitrov (Turkey) Marsel İlhan	3–6, 6–2, [10–6]
1995	(Switzerland) Lorenzo Manta (Italy) Omar Camporese	(Argentina) Carlos Gómez-Díaz (Spain) Álex Calatrava	6–3, 6–4
1994	(Germany) Alexander Mronz (Austria) Alex Antonitsch	(Finland) Olli Rahnasto (Norway) Bent-Ove Pedersen	6–3, 6–4
1993	(The Bahamas) Roger Smith (France) Jean-Philippe Fleurian	(United Kingdom) Miles Maclagan (Romania) Dinu Pescariu	7–6, 6–3
1992	(France) Stéphane Simian (France) Bertrand Lemercier	(The Bahamas) Roger Smith (Argentina) Roberto Saad	7–6, 7–6
1991	(Sweden) Nils Holm (Sweden) Henrik Holm	(Finland) Olli Rahnasto (Italy) Gianluca Pozzi	5–7, 7–5, 6–4
