= 2022 Istanbul Challenger – Doubles =

Doubles
- 2022 Istanbul Challenger

Final
- Champions: (India) Purav Raja (India) Divij Sharan
- Runners-up: (India) Arjun Kadhe (Brazil) Fernando Romboli
- Score: 6–4, 3–6, [10–8]

Events
Singles	Doubles
← 2021 ·	Istanbul Challenger	· 2023 →

Radu Albot and Alexander Cozbinov were the defending champions but chose not to defend their title.

Purav Raja and Divij Sharan won the title after defeating Arjun Kadhe and Fernando Romboli 6–4, 3–6, [10–8] in the final.

== Seeds ==
1. (India) Arjun Kadhe / (Brazil) Fernando Romboli (final)
2. (India) Purav Raja / (India) Divij Sharan (champions)
3. (Zimbabwe) Benjamin Lock / (Zimbabwe) Courtney John Lock (quarterfinals)
4. (Australia) Akira Santillan / (Australia) Brandon Walkin (quarterfinals)

== Draw ==
Key

- Q = Qualifier
- WC = Wild card
- LL = Lucky loser
- Alt = Alternate
- ITF = ITF entry
- PR = Protected ranking
- SR = Special ranking
- SE = Special exempt
- JE = Junior exempt
- JR = Junior Accelerator Programme entrant
- CO = College Accelerator Programme entrant
- NG = Next Gen Accelerator Program entrant
- w/o = Walkover
- r = Retired
- d = Defaulted

First round
(India) A Chandrasekar (India) VS Prashanth	2	6	[10]
(India) Rishab Agarwal (Germany) Adrian Oetzbach	6	2	[3]
4	(Australia) A Santillan (Australia) B Walkin	6	6
WC	(Turkey) K Kırcı (Bosnia and Herzegovina) A Šetkić	1	1
(Georgia (country)) A Metreveli (Czech Republic) D Palán	3	3
(France) G Blancaneaux (France) L Lokoli	6	6
(Turkey) T Altuna (Italy) L Giustino	5	6	[13]
(Bulgaria) P Milushev (Bulgaria) R Shandarov	7	4	[11]
(Italy) Davide Pozzi (Italy) Augusto Virgili	3	4
3	(Zimbabwe) B Lock (Zimbabwe) CJ Lock	6	6
(Romania) A Jecan (Romania) Dan Alexandru Tomescu	6	6
Alt	(Turkey) S Ağabigün (Turkey) Cengiz Aksu	3	2
WC	(Turkey) Berk İlkel (Turkey) S Mert Özdemir	4	4
2	(India) P Raja (India) D Sharan	6	6

Quarterfinals
1	(India) A Kadhe (Brazil) F Romboli	6	7^{7}
(India) A Chandrasekar (India) VS Prashanth	4	6^{4}
4	(Australia) A Santillan (Australia) B Walkin	2	6	[10]
(France) G Blancaneaux (France) L Lokoli	6	2	[12]
(Turkey) T Altuna (Italy) L Giustino	6	6
3	(Zimbabwe) B Lock (Zimbabwe) CJ Lock	4	4
(Romania) A Jecan (Romania) DA Tomescu	4	4
2	(India) P Raja (India) D Sharan	6	6

Semifinals
1	(India) A Kadhe (Brazil) F Romboli	w/o
(France) G Blancaneaux (France) L Lokoli
(Turkey) T Altuna (Italy) L Giustino	3	4
2	(India) P Raja (India) D Sharan	6	6

Final
1	(India) A Kadhe (Brazil) F Romboli	4	6	[8]
2	(India) P Raja (India) D Sharan	6	3	[10]
