= 2022 Istanbul Challenger =

- Date: 12–18 September
- Edition: 36th
- Surface: Hard
- Location: Istanbul, Turkey

Champions

Singles
- (Moldova) Radu Albot

Doubles
- (India) Purav Raja / (India) Divij Sharan
← 2021 ·	Istanbul Challenger	· 2023 →

The 2022 Istanbul Challenger was a professional tennis tournament played on hardcourts. It was the 36th edition of the tournament which was part of the 2022 ATP Challenger Tour. It took place in Istanbul, Turkey between 12 and 18 September 2022.

== Singles main-draw entrants ==
=== Seeds ===
Country	Player	Rank^{1}	Seed
AUS	James Duckworth	83	1
MDA	Radu Albot	106	2
ESP	Fernando Verdasco	122	3
FRA	Geoffrey Blancaneaux	148	4
GBR	Paul Jubb	206	5
FRA	Laurent Lokoli	217	6
AUT	Sebastian Ofner	218	7
ESP	Nicolás Álvarez Varona	220	8

- ^{1} Rankings are as of 30 August 2022.

=== Other entrants ===
The following players received wildcards into the singles main draw:

- (Turkey) Berk İlkel
- (Turkey) Koray Kırcı
- (Georgia (country)) Aleksandre Metreveli

The following players received entry from the qualifying draw:

- (Turkey) Sarp Ağabigün
- (Turkey) Cengiz Aksu
- (France) Térence Atmane
- (Czech Republic) Marek Gengel
- (Czech Republic) Dominik Palán
- (Kazakhstan) Beibit Zhukayev

The following player received entry as a lucky loser:

- (Romania) Bogdan Ionuț Apostol

== Champions ==
=== Singles ===
- (Moldova) Radu Albot def. (Czech Republic) Lukáš Rosol 6–2, 6–0.

=== Doubles ===
- (India) Purav Raja / (India) Divij Sharan def. (India) Arjun Kadhe / (Brazil) Fernando Romboli 6–4, 3–6, [10–8].
