= 2021 Amex-Istanbul Challenger II – Singles =

Singles
- 2021 Amex-Istanbul Challenger II

Final
- Champion: (Australia) James Duckworth
- Runner-up: (Chinese Taipei) Wu Tung-lin
- Score: 6–4, 6–2

Events
Singles	Doubles
← 2021 ·	Amex-Istanbul Challenger	· 2022 →

Arthur Rinderknech was the defending champion but chose not to defend his title.

James Duckworth won the title after defeating Wu Tung-lin 6–4, 6–2 in the final.

== Seeds ==
1. (Australia) James Duckworth (champion)
2. (Moldova) Radu Albot (second round)
3. (Colombia) Daniel Elahi Galán (first round)
4. (Japan) Yasutaka Uchiyama (quarterfinals)
5. (Australia) Marc Polmans (second round)
6. (Russia) Evgeny Donskoy (second round)
7. (Ukraine) Illya Marchenko (second round)
8. (Egypt) Mohamed Safwat (withdrew)

== Draw ==
=== Key ===
- Q = Qualifier
- WC = Wild card
- LL = Lucky loser
- Alt = Alternate
- SE = Special exempt
- PR = Protected ranking
- ITF = ITF entry
- JE = Junior exempt
- w/o = Walkover
- r = Retired
- d = Defaulted
- SR = Special ranking

=== Finals ===
Semifinals
1	(Australia) James Duckworth	6^{9}	6	6
(France) Quentin Halys	7^{11}	3	4
(Croatia) Borna Gojo	4	6	4
(Chinese Taipei) Wu Tung-lin	6	3	6

Final
1	(Australia) James Duckworth	6	6
(Chinese Taipei) Wu Tung-lin	4	2

=== Top half ===
First round
1	(Australia) J Duckworth	7	6
(Italy) L Giustino	5	1
(France) A Müller	6	6
Q	(United States) N Chappell	4	2
WC	(Turkey) S Ağabigün	4	6	4
(France) H Grenier	6	3	6
(Russia) A Kuznetsov	6^{4}	1
6	(Russia) E Donskoy	7^{7}	6
4	(Japan) Y Uchiyama	6	3	6
(Japan) H Moriya	3	6	3
Q	(Belgium) Christopher Heyman	3	6	6
(Italy) A Arnaboldi	6	2	4
(Australia) B Tomic	0	1
(France) Q Halys	6	6
(Italy) T Fabbiano	5	2
7	(Ukraine) I Marchenko	7	6

Second round
1	(Australia) J Duckworth	6	6
(France) A Müller	3	2
(France) H Grenier	6	6
6	(Russia) E Donskoy	4	4
4	(Japan) Y Uchiyama	3	6	6
Q	(Belgium) C Heyman	6	3	4
(France) Q Halys	3	6	6
7	(Ukraine) I Marchenko	6	2	2

Quarterfinals
1	(Australia) J Duckworth	6	6
(France) H Grenier	3	3
4	(Japan) Y Uchiyama	5	2
(France) Q Halys	7	6

Semifinals
1	(Australia) J Duckworth	6^{9}	6	6
(France) Q Halys	7^{11}	3	4

=== Bottom half ===
First round
LL	(France) G Blancaneaux	4	7^{7}	6
Q	(France) L Lokoli	6	6^{5}	1
(Chinese Taipei) C-h Tseng	6	2	6
(Italy) R Marcora	1	6	4
(Russia) E Tiurnev	5	6	0
(Russia) E Karlovskiy	7	4	6
(Croatia) B Gojo	6	3	6
3	(Colombia) DE Galán	4	6	2
5	(Australia) M Polmans	6	6
WC	(Turkey) K Kırcı	3	2
(Japan) T Ito	3	2
(Chinese Taipei) T-l Wu	6	6
Q	(Bosnia and Herzegovina) A Šetkić	6	6
WC	(Romania) VV Cornea	4	2
(Australia) M Ebden	4	6	1
2	(Moldova) R Albot	6	1	6

Second round
LL	(France) G Blancaneaux	6	7
(Chinese Taipei) C-h Tseng	3	5
(Russia) E Karlovskiy	1	7^{7}	6^{5}
(Croatia) B Gojo	6	6^{4}	7^{7}
5	(Australia) M Polmans	2	6	1
(Chinese Taipei) T-l Wu	6	3	6
Q	(Bosnia and Herzegovina) A Šetkić	4	6	7
2	(Moldova) R Albot	6	3	5

Quarterfinals
LL	(France) G Blancaneaux	6^{6}	4
(Croatia) B Gojo	7^{8}	6
(Chinese Taipei) T-l Wu	6	6
Q	(Bosnia and Herzegovina) A Šetkić	3	2

Semifinals
(Croatia) B Gojo	4	6	4
(Chinese Taipei) T-l Wu	6	3	6
