= 2021 Amex-Istanbul Challenger II – Doubles =

Doubles
- 2021 Amex-Istanbul Challenger II

Final
- Champions: (Moldova) Radu Albot (Moldova) Alexander Cozbinov
- Runners-up: (Croatia) Antonio Šančić (New Zealand) Artem Sitak
- Score: 4–6, 7–5, [11–9]

Events
Singles	Doubles
← 2021 ·	Amex-Istanbul Challenger	· 2022 →

André Göransson and David Pel were the defending champions but chose not to defend their title.

Radu Albot and Alexander Cozbinov won the title after defeating Antonio Šančić and Artem Sitak 4–6, 7–5, [11–9] in the final.

== Seeds ==
1. (Croatia) Antonio Šančić / (New Zealand) Artem Sitak (final)
2. (United States) James Cerretani / (Germany) Fabian Fallert (semifinals)
3. (Kazakhstan) Alexander Bublik / (Russia) Daniil Golubev (first round)
4. (Philippines) Ruben Gonzales / (United States) Hunter Johnson (semifinals)

== Draw ==
=== Key ===
- Q = Qualifier
- WC = Wild card
- LL = Lucky loser
- Alt = Alternate
- SE = Special exempt
- PR = Protected ranking
- ITF = ITF entry
- JE = Junior exempt
- w/o = Walkover
- r = Retired
- d = Defaulted
- SR = Special ranking

First round
1	(Croatia) A Šančić (New Zealand) A Sitak	6	6
WC	(Turkey) S Ağabigün (Turkey) T Altuna	2	3
(France) G Blancaneaux (Italy) T Fabbiano	6	6
(Russia) A Dubrivnyy (Russia) E Tiurnev	3	4
4	(Philippines) R Gonzales (United States) H Johnson	6	6
(Italy) A Arnaboldi (Italy) L Giustino	4	3
WC	(Turkey) K Kırcı (Bosnia and Herzegovina) A Šetkić	1	6	[10]
(France) J Eysseric (France) Q Halys	6	4	[8]
(Chinese Taipei) Y-h Hsu (Russia) E Karlovskiy	4	6	[11]
Alt	(Germany) Elmar Ejupovic (Romania) A Jecan	6	3	[9]
(Moldova) R Albot (Moldova) A Cozbinov	6	6
3/WC	(Kazakhstan) A Bublik (Russia) D Golubev	1	2
(India) S Balaji (Japan) H Moriya	6	6
PR	(Chinese Taipei) C-h Tseng (Chinese Taipei) T-l Wu	4	1
(France) H Grenier (France) A Müller	1	5
2/PR	(United States) J Cerretani (Germany) F Fallert	6	7

Quarterfinals
1	(Croatia) A Šančić (New Zealand) A Sitak	6	6^{2}	[13]
(France) G Blancaneaux (Italy) T Fabbiano	0	7^{7}	[11]
4	(Philippines) R Gonzales (United States) H Johnson	6	6
WC	(Turkey) K Kırcı (Bosnia and Herzegovina) A Šetkić	0	2
(Chinese Taipei) Y-h Hsu (Russia) E Karlovskiy	5	6	[3]
(Moldova) R Albot (Moldova) A Cozbinov	7	3	[10]
(India) S Balaji (Japan) H Moriya	6	6^{5}	[7]
2/PR	(United States) J Cerretani (Germany) F Fallert	3	7^{7}	[10]

Semifinals
1	(Croatia) A Šančić (New Zealand) A Sitak	4	6	[10]
4	(Philippines) R Gonzales (United States) H Johnson	6	2	[5]
(Moldova) R Albot (Moldova) A Cozbinov	7^{7}	6
2/PR	(United States) J Cerretani (Germany) F Fallert	6^{5}	3

Final
1	(Croatia) A Šančić (New Zealand) A Sitak	6	5	[9]
(Moldova) R Albot (Moldova) A Cozbinov	4	7	[11]
