= 2022 Istanbul Challenger – Singles =

Singles
- 2022 Istanbul Challenger

Final
- Champion: (Moldova) Radu Albot
- Runner-up: (Czech Republic) Lukáš Rosol
- Score: 6–2, 6–0

Events
Singles	Doubles
← 2021 ·	Istanbul Challenger	· 2023 →

James Duckworth was the defending champion but lost in the first round to Lukáš Rosol.

Radu Albot won the title after defeating Rosol 6–2, 6–0 in the final.

== Seeds ==
1. (Australia) James Duckworth (first round)
2. (Moldova) Radu Albot (champion)
3. (Spain) Fernando Verdasco (second round)
4. (France) Geoffrey Blancaneaux (semifinals)
5. (United Kingdom) Paul Jubb (first round)
6. (France) Laurent Lokoli (quarterfinals)
7. (Austria) Sebastian Ofner (quarterfinals)
8. (Spain) Nicolás Álvarez Varona (second round)

== Draw ==
Key

- Q = Qualifier
- WC = Wild card
- LL = Lucky loser
- Alt = Alternate
- ITF = ITF entry
- PR = Protected ranking
- SR = Special ranking
- SE = Special exempt
- JE = Junior exempt
- JR = Junior Accelerator Programme entrant
- CO = College Accelerator Programme entrant
- NG = Next Gen Accelerator Program entrant
- w/o = Walkover
- r = Retired
- d = Defaulted

=== Finals ===
Semifinals
(Czech Republic) Lukáš Rosol	6	6
WC	(Turkey) Koray Kırcı	3	4
4	(France) Geoffrey Blancaneaux	6	1	2
2	(Moldova) Radu Albot	1	6	6

Final
(Czech Republic) Lukáš Rosol	2	0
2	(Moldova) Radu Albot	6	6

=== Top half ===
First round
1	(Australia) J Duckworth	2	6^{1}
(Czech Republic) L Rosol	6	7^{7}
(Zimbabwe) B Lock	3	2
(Netherlands) R Haase	6	6
Q	(France) T Atmane	6	6
(Israel) B Patael	4	4
E Donskoy	3	2
6	(France) L Lokoli	6	6
3	(Spain) F Verdasco	6	6
WC	(Turkey) Berk İlkel	4	1
WC	(Georgia (country)) A Metreveli	7^{11}	4	2
WC	(Turkey) K Kırcı	6^{9}	6	6
Q	(Czech Republic) M Gengel	5	4
(Ukraine) I Marchenko	7	6
Q	(Turkey) S Ağabigün	2	4
7	(Austria) S Ofner	6	6

Second round
(Czech Republic) L Rosol	6	6
(Netherlands) R Haase	3	1
Q	(France) T Atmane	6^{5}	7	4
6	(France) L Lokoli	7^{7}	5	6
3	(Spain) F Verdasco	4	3
WC	(Turkey) K Kırcı	6	6
(Ukraine) I Marchenko	1	5
7	(Austria) S Ofner	6	7

Quarterfinals
(Czech Republic) L Rosol	6	6
6	(France) L Lokoli	4	4
WC	(Turkey) K Kırcı	4	6	6
7	(Austria) S Ofner	6	3	3

Semifinals
(Czech Republic) L Rosol	6	6
WC	(Turkey) K Kırcı	3	4

=== Bottom half ===
First round
5	(United Kingdom) P Jubb	3	7	0
(France) H Mayot	6	5	6
(Italy) L Giustino	6	6
Q	(Czech Republic) D Palán	2	2
(Serbia) H Međedović	4	4
(United Kingdom) A Gray	6	6
A Kachmazov	4	4
4	(France) G Blancaneaux	6	6
8	(Spain) N Álvarez Varona	6	6
(Bosnia and Herzegovina) A Šetkić	1	4
Q	(Kazakhstan) B Zhukayev	6	6
Q	(Turkey) Cengiz Aksu	3	4
(Germany) H Squire	6	0
LL	(Romania) Bogdan Ionuț Apostol	2	0^{r}
(Romania) FC Jianu	6^{6}	4
2	(Moldova) R Albot	7^{8}	6

Second round
(France) H Mayot	7	7
(Italy) L Giustino	5	5
(United Kingdom) A Gray	7^{7}	2	2
4	(France) G Blancaneaux	6^{4}	6	6
8	(Spain) N Álvarez Varona	4	1
Q	(Kazakhstan) B Zhukayev	6	6
(Germany) H Squire	4	3
2	(Moldova) R Albot	6	6

Quarterfinals
(France) H Mayot	3	4
4	(France) G Blancaneaux	6	6
Q	(Kazakhstan) B Zhukayev	2	6	6^{4}
2	(Moldova) R Albot	6	4	7^{7}

Semifinals
4	(France) G Blancaneaux	6	1	2
2	(Moldova) R Albot	1	6	6
