= 2021 Amex-Istanbul Challenger =

- Date: 18–24 January
- Edition: 34th
- Surface: Hard (Indoor)
- Location: Istanbul, Turkey

Champions

Singles
- (France) Arthur Rinderknech

Doubles
- (Sweden) André Göransson / (Netherlands) David Pel
← 2020 ·	Amex-Istanbul Challenger	· 2021 →

The 2021 Amex-Istanbul Challenger was a professional tennis tournament played on hard courts. It was the 34th edition of the tournament which was part of the 2021 ATP Challenger Tour. It took place in Istanbul, Turkey between 18 and 24 January 2021.

== Singles main-draw entrants ==
=== Seeds ===
Country	Player	Rank^{1}	Seed
COL	Daniel Elahi Galán	115	1
BRA	Thiago Seyboth Wild	117	2
FRA	Antoine Hoang	121	3
ARG	Facundo Bagnis	125	4
IND	Prajnesh Gunneswaran	128	5
ITA	Lorenzo Musetti	129	6
SVK	Jozef Kovalík	131	7
JPN	Go Soeda	134	8

- ^{1} Rankings are as of 11 January 2021.

=== Other entrants ===
The following players received wildcards into the singles main draw:

- (Turkey) Altuğ Çelikbilek
- (Turkey) Cem İlkel
- (Turkey) Ergi Kırkın

The following players received entry from the qualifying draw:

- (United Kingdom) Jay Clarke
- (Brazil) João Menezes
- (France) Arthur Rinderknech
- (Czech Republic) Lukáš Rosol

The following player received entry as a lucky loser:

- (Uzbekistan) Denis Istomin

== Champions ==
=== Singles ===
- (France) Arthur Rinderknech def. (France) Benjamin Bonzi 4–6, 7–6^{(7–1)}, 7–6^{(7–3)}.

=== Doubles ===
- (Sweden) André Göransson / (Netherlands) David Pel def. (United Kingdom) Lloyd Glasspool / (Finland) Harri Heliövaara 4–6, 6–3, [10–8].
