= 2017 Prosperita Open – Doubles =

Doubles
- 2017 Prosperita Open

Final
- Champions: (India) Jeevan Nedunchezhiyan (Croatia) Franko Škugor
- Runners-up: (Australia) Rameez Junaid (Czech Republic) Lukáš Rosol
- Score: 6–3, 6–2

Events
Singles	Doubles
- Prosperita Open

Sander Arends and Tristan-Samuel Weissborn were the defending champions but chose not to defend their title.

Jeevan Nedunchezhiyan and Franko Škugor won the title after defeating Rameez Junaid and Lukáš Rosol 6–3, 6–2 in the final.

== Seeds ==
1. (India) Jeevan Nedunchezhiyan / (Croatia) Franko Škugor (champions)
2. (Croatia) Marin Draganja / (Croatia) Tomislav Draganja (quarterfinals)
3. (Poland) Tomasz Bednarek / (Kazakhstan) Andrey Golubev (first round)
4. (Belgium) Sander Gillé / (Belgium) Joran Vliegen (semifinals)

== Draw ==
Key

- Q = Qualifier
- WC = Wild card
- LL = Lucky loser
- Alt = Alternate
- ITF = ITF entry
- PR = Protected ranking
- SR = Special ranking
- SE = Special exempt
- JE = Junior exempt
- JR = Junior Accelerator Programme entrant
- CO = College Accelerator Programme entrant
- NG = Next Gen Accelerator Program entrant
- w/o = Walkover
- r = Retired
- d = Defaulted

First round
1	(India) J Nedunchezhiyan (Croatia) F Škugor	6	6
(Italy) M Cecchinato (Italy) M Donati	3	3
Alt	(Czech Republic) J Mertl (Czech Republic) J Šátral	3	2
(Slovakia) N Gombos (Czech Republic) Z Kolář	6	6
3	(Poland) T Bednarek (Kazakhstan) A Golubev	3	4
WC	(Czech Republic) M Gengel (Czech Republic) Marek Jaloviec	6	6
(Spain) R Carballés Baena (Spain) R Ramírez Hidalgo	6	4	[10]
WC	(India) S Nagal (Czech Republic) D Poljak	2	6	[7]
(Spain) J Samper-Montaña (Argentina) M Trungelliti
Alt	(Hungary) A Balázs (Hungary) G Borsos	w/o
(Italy) L Giustino (Netherlands) D Pel	5	3
4	(Belgium) S Gillé (Belgium) J Vliegen	7	6
(Australia) R Junaid (Czech Republic) L Rosol	6	6
(Poland) M Kowalczyk (Poland) G Panfil	3	1
WC	(Czech Republic) D Kellovský (Czech Republic) Petr Michnev	4	4
2	(Croatia) M Draganja (Croatia) T Draganja	6	6

Quarterfinals
1	(India) J Nedunchezhiyan (Croatia) F Škugor	6	5	[10]
(Slovakia) N Gombos (Czech Republic) Z Kolář	4	7	[3]
WC	(Czech Republic) M Gengel (Czech Republic) M Jaloviec	4	2
(Spain) R Carballés Baena (Spain) R Ramírez Hidalgo	6	6
Alt	(Hungary) A Balázs (Hungary) G Borsos	1	3
4	(Belgium) S Gillé (Belgium) J Vliegen	6	6
(Australia) R Junaid (Czech Republic) L Rosol	6	6^{5}	[10]
2	(Croatia) M Draganja (Croatia) T Draganja	4	7^{7}	[4]

Semifinals
1	(India) J Nedunchezhiyan (Croatia) F Škugor	w/o
(Spain) R Carballés Baena (Spain) R Ramírez Hidalgo
4	(Belgium) S Gillé (Belgium) J Vliegen	7^{7}	4	[8]
(Australia) R Junaid (Czech Republic) L Rosol	6^{3}	6	[10]

Final
1	(India) J Nedunchezhiyan (Croatia) F Škugor	6	6
(Australia) R Junaid (Czech Republic) L Rosol	3	2
