= 2023 Istanbul Challenger – Singles =

Singles
- 2023 Istanbul Challenger

Final
- Champion: (Bosnia and Herzegovina) Damir Džumhur
- Runner-up: (Slovakia) Lukáš Klein
- Score: 7–6^{(7–5)}, 6–3

Events
Singles	Doubles
- Istanbul Challenger

Radu Albot was the defending champion but chose not to defend his title.

Damir Džumhur won the title after defeating Lukáš Klein 7–6^{(7–5)}, 6–3 in the final.

== Seeds ==
1. (South Korea) Kwon Soon-woo (first round)
2. (Netherlands) Jesper de Jong (semifinals)
3. (Slovakia) Lukáš Klein (final)
4. (Croatia) Dino Prižmić (quarterfinals)
5. (Belgium) Gauthier Onclin (first round)
6. (France) Harold Mayot (second round)
7. (Bosnia and Herzegovina) Damir Džumhur (champion)
8. (Slovakia) Norbert Gombos (first round)

== Draw ==
Key

- Q = Qualifier
- WC = Wild card
- LL = Lucky loser
- Alt = Alternate
- ITF = ITF entry
- PR = Protected ranking
- SR = Special ranking
- SE = Special exempt
- JE = Junior exempt
- JR = Junior Accelerator Programme entrant
- CO = College Accelerator Programme entrant
- NG = Next Gen Accelerator Program entrant
- w/o = Walkover
- r = Retired
- d = Defaulted

=== Finals ===
Semifinals
(Dominican Republic) Nick Hardt	4	3
7	(Bosnia and Herzegovina) Damir Džumhur	6	6
3	(Slovakia) Lukáš Klein	7^{7}	6^{2}	7^{7}
2	(Netherlands) Jesper de Jong	6^{2}	7^{7}	6^{5}

Final
7	(Bosnia and Herzegovina) Damir Džumhur	7^{7}	6
3	(Slovakia) Lukáš Klein	6^{5}	3

=== Top half ===
First round
1	(South Korea) S-w Kwon	0	1
(Dominican Republic) N Hardt	6	6
(Tunisia) S Mansouri	3	4
(Australia) B Tomic	6	6
(Romania) M Copil	2	4
Q	(Israel) Y Oliel	6	6
(Turkey) A Çelikbilek	6	6
5	(Belgium) G Onclin	1	0
4	(Croatia) D Prižmić	6	6^{3}	7
(Germany) L Wessels	2	7^{7}	5
Q	(Jamaica) B Bicknell	6^{5}	7^{7}	6
(France) M Martineau	7^{7}	6^{3}	3
(Turkey) Y Erel	6	1
Q	(Israel) D Cukierman	2	0^{r}
WC	(Turkey) T Duran	4	1
7	(Bosnia and Herzegovina) D Džumhur	6	6

Second round
(Dominican Republic) N Hardt	6	3	7^{8}
(Australia) B Tomic	2	6	6^{6}
Q	(Israel) Y Oliel	6	4	3
(Turkey) A Çelikbilek	2	6	6
4	(Croatia) D Prižmić	4	6	6
Q	(Jamaica) B Bicknell	6	3	2
(Turkey) Y Erel	5	3
7	(Bosnia and Herzegovina) D Džumhur	7	6

Quarterfinals
(Dominican Republic) N Hardt	1	7^{7}	4
(Turkey) A Çelikbilek	6	6^{5}	1^{r}
4	(Croatia) D Prižmić	3	7^{7}	5
7	(Bosnia and Herzegovina) D Džumhur	6	6^{3}	7

Semifinals
(Dominican Republic) N Hardt	4	3
7	(Bosnia and Herzegovina) D Džumhur	6	6

=== Bottom half ===
First round
8	(Slovakia) N Gombos	6	1	2
(Kazakhstan) D Yevseyev	4	6	6
Q	(Sweden) L Borg	1	6	3
WC	(Turkey) K Kırcı	6	3	6
(Czech Republic) M Gengel	1	2
WC	(Turkey) E Kırkın	6	6
Q	(United States) M Damm	4	6	5
3	(Slovakia) L Klein	6	4	7
6	(France) H Mayot	7^{7}	7
(Tunisia) A Dougaz	6^{4}	5
(Turkey) C İlkel	5	4
(France) G Mpetshi Perricard	7	6
(United Kingdom) J Monday	4	6	6
(Poland) K Żuk	6	1	4
Q	(Turkey) M İlhan	2	7^{7}	2
2	(Netherlands) J de Jong	6	6^{3}	6

Second round
(Kazakhstan) D Yevseyev	6	7^{7}
WC	(Turkey) K Kırcı	2	6^{4}
WC	(Turkey) E Kırkın	3	4
3	(Slovakia) L Klein	6	6
6	(France) H Mayot	7^{7}	3	3
(France) G Mpetshi Perricard	6^{1}	6	6
(United Kingdom) J Monday	5	1
2	(Netherlands) J de Jong	7	6

Quarterfinals
(Kazakhstan) D Yevseyev	6^{5}	7^{7}	6^{2}
3	(Slovakia) L Klein	7^{7}	6^{3}	7^{7}
(France) G Mpetshi Perricard	5	4
2	(Netherlands) J de Jong	7	6

Semifinals
3	(Slovakia) L Klein	7^{7}	6^{2}	7^{7}
2	(Netherlands) J de Jong	6^{2}	7^{7}	6^{5}
