= 2017 Prosperita Open – Singles =

Singles
- 2017 Prosperita Open

Final
- Champion: (Italy) Stefano Travaglia
- Runner-up: (Italy) Marco Cecchinato
- Score: 6–2, 3–6, 6–4

Events
Singles	Doubles
- Prosperita Open

Constant Lestienne was the defending champion but retired in the first round against Simone Bolelli.

Stefano Travaglia won the title after defeating Marco Cecchinato 6–2, 3–6, 6–4 in the final.

== Seeds ==
1. (Slovakia) Norbert Gombos (second round)
2. (Czech Republic) Adam Pavlásek (semifinals)
3. (Italy) Alessandro Giannessi (withdrew)
4. (Spain) Roberto Carballés Baena (quarterfinals)
5. (Spain) Rubén Ramírez Hidalgo (second round)
6. (Czech Republic) Lukáš Rosol (second round)
7. (Czech Republic) Jan Šátral (first round)
8. (Italy) Marco Cecchinato (final)

== Draw ==
Key

- Q = Qualifier
- WC = Wild card
- LL = Lucky loser
- Alt = Alternate
- ITF = ITF entry
- PR = Protected ranking
- SR = Special ranking
- SE = Special exempt
- JE = Junior exempt
- JR = Junior Accelerator Programme entrant
- CO = College Accelerator Programme entrant
- NG = Next Gen Accelerator Program entrant
- w/o = Walkover
- r = Retired
- d = Defaulted

=== Finals ===
Semifinals
8	(Italy) Marco Cecchinato	6^{5}	6	6
Q	(Hungary) Attila Balázs	7^{7}	4	4
(Italy) Stefano Travaglia	6	7
2	(Czech Republic) Adam Pavlásek	3	5

Final
8	(Italy) Marco Cecchinato	2	6	4
(Italy) Stefano Travaglia	6	3	6

=== Top half ===
First round
1	(Slovakia) N Gombos	1	6	6
(Spain) R Ojeda Lara	6	3	1
(Argentina) M Trungelliti	3	7	6
(Serbia) F Krajinović	6	5	1
(Belgium) J De Loore	6	6^{5}	6
(Serbia) M Zekić	4	7^{7}	2
(Croatia) K Mesaroš	7	3	3
8	(Italy) M Cecchinato	5	6	6
LL	(Spain) C Taberner	2	0
Q	(Austria) S Ofner	6	6
PR	(Italy) S Bolelli	6	4	5
(France) C Lestienne	3	6	0^{r}
Q	(Hungary) A Balázs	6	6
(Spain) J Samper-Montaña	2	3
(Bosnia and Herzegovina) A Šetkić	3	0
6	(Czech Republic) L Rosol	6	6

Second round
1	(Slovakia) N Gombos	2	6	3
(Argentina) M Trungelliti	6	4	6
(Belgium) J De Loore	4	3
8	(Italy) M Cecchinato	6	6
Q	(Austria) S Ofner	5	1
PR	(Italy) S Bolelli	7	6
Q	(Hungary) A Balázs	6	6
6	(Czech Republic) L Rosol	3	3

Quarterfinals
(Argentina) M Trungelliti	6^{2}	3
8	(Italy) M Cecchinato	7^{7}	6
PR	(Italy) S Bolelli	7^{7}	3	4
Q	(Hungary) A Balázs	6^{4}	6	6

Semifinals
8	(Italy) M Cecchinato	6^{5}	6	6
Q	(Hungary) A Balázs	7^{7}	4	4

=== Bottom half ===
First round
5	(Spain) R Ramírez Hidalgo	6	6
WC	(Czech Republic) D Poljak	3	2
(Italy) S Travaglia	6	6
(Italy) L Giustino	1	3
Q	(Austria) Lenny Hampel	6^{3}	6^{1}
(Belgium) Y Reuter	7^{7}	7^{7}
WC	(Czech Republic) D Kellovský	5	0
4	(Spain) R Carballés Baena	7	6
7	(Czech Republic) J Šátral	7	3	5
LL	(Romania) D Dima	5	6	7
(Italy) S Napolitano	6	6
Q	(Morocco) R El Amrani	1	2
WC	(Slovakia) Dominik Šproch	0	2
WC	(Czech Republic) Z Kolář	6	6
(Italy) M Donati	2	4
2	(Czech Republic) A Pavlásek	6	6

Second round
5	(Spain) R Ramírez Hidalgo	3	1
(Italy) S Travaglia	6	6
(Belgium) Y Reuter	0	2
4	(Spain) R Carballés Baena	6	6
LL	(Romania) D Dima	1	2
(Italy) S Napolitano	6	6
WC	(Czech Republic) Z Kolář	2	4
2	(Czech Republic) A Pavlásek	6	6

Quarterfinals
(Italy) S Travaglia	2	6	6
4	(Spain) R Carballés Baena	6	4	4
(Italy) S Napolitano	6	1	4
2	(Czech Republic) A Pavlásek	2	6	6

Semifinals
(Italy) S Travaglia	6	7
2	(Czech Republic) A Pavlásek	3	5
