= 2021 Amex-Istanbul Challenger – Singles =

Singles
- 2021 Amex-Istanbul Challenger

Final
- Champion: (France) Arthur Rinderknech
- Runner-up: (France) Benjamin Bonzi
- Score: 4–6, 7–6^{(7–1)}, 7–6^{(7–3)}

Events
Singles	Doubles
← 2020 ·	Amex-Istanbul Challenger	· 2021 →

Ilya Ivashka was the defending champion but chose not to defend his title.

Arthur Rinderknech won the title after defeating Benjamin Bonzi 4–6, 7–6^{(7–1)}, 7–6^{(7–3)} in the final.

== Seeds ==
1. (Colombia) Daniel Elahi Galán (first round)
2. (Brazil) Thiago Seyboth Wild (first round)
3. (France) Antoine Hoang (quarterfinals)
4. (Argentina) Facundo Bagnis (second round)
5. (India) Prajnesh Gunneswaran (first round, retired)
6. (Italy) Lorenzo Musetti (second round)
7. (Slovakia) Jozef Kovalík (semifinals)
8. (Japan) Go Soeda (quarterfinals, withdrew)

== Draw ==
=== Key ===
- Q = Qualifier
- WC = Wild card
- LL = Lucky loser
- Alt = Alternate
- SE = Special exempt
- PR = Protected ranking
- ITF = ITF entry
- JE = Junior exempt
- w/o = Walkover
- r = Retired
- d = Defaulted
- SR = Special ranking

=== Finals ===
Semifinals
7	(Slovakia) Jozef Kovalík	5	4
Q	(France) Arthur Rinderknech	7	6
(France) Benjamin Bonzi	7^{7}	6
(Egypt) Mohamed Safwat	6^{1}	4

Final
Q	(France) Arthur Rinderknech	4	7^{7}	7^{7}
(France) Benjamin Bonzi	6	6^{1}	6^{3}

=== Top half ===
First round
1	(Colombia) DE Galán	6^{5}	3
Q	(Brazil) J Menezes	7^{7}	6
WC	(Turkey) E Kırkın	6	6
(Italy) P Lorenzi	4	2
(Spain) B Zapata Miralles	4	2
(Spain) C Taberner	6	6
WC	(Turkey) A Çelikbilek	5	6	4
7	(Slovakia) J Kovalík	7	2	6
4	(Argentina) F Bagnis	6	6
(China) Zh Zhang	4	1
(Switzerland) M-A Hüsler	2	6	6
LL	(Uzbekistan) D Istomin	6	2	4
(United States) B Nakashima	3	6	6
WC	(Turkey) C İlkel	6	4	3
Q	(France) A Rinderknech	6	3
5	(India) P Gunneswaran	4	2^{r}

Second round
Q	(Brazil) J Menezes	2	6^{5}
WC	(Turkey) E Kırkın	6	7^{7}
(Spain) C Taberner	6^{4}	0
7	(Slovakia) J Kovalík	7^{7}	6
4	(Argentina) F Bagnis	5	2
(Switzerland) M-A Hüsler	7	6
(United States) B Nakashima	7^{9}	1	4
Q	(France) A Rinderknech	6^{7}	6	6

Quarterfinals
WC	(Turkey) E Kırkın	7^{7}	0	6^{3}
7	(Slovakia) J Kovalík	6^{5}	6	7^{7}
(Switzerland) M-A Hüsler	5	3
Q	(France) A Rinderknech	7	6

Semifinals
7	(Slovakia) J Kovalík	5	4
Q	(France) A Rinderknech	7	6

=== Bottom half ===
First round
6	(Italy) L Musetti	6	7^{8}
(Serbia) D Petrović	4	6^{6}
(Slovenia) B Rola	4	1^{r}
(France) B Bonzi	6	2
(Italy) L Giustino	7	7^{7}
(Italy) A Giannessi	5	6^{5}
(Ecuador) E Gómez	7^{7}	2	4
3	(France) A Hoang	6^{3}	6	6
8	(Japan) G Soeda	6	6
(Chile) A Tabilo	3	3
Q	(Czech Republic) L Rosol	4	6^{3}
(Netherlands) T Griekspoor	6	7^{7}
Q	(United Kingdom) J Clarke	3	5
(Italy) F Gaio	6	7
(Egypt) M Safwat	6	6
2	(Brazil) T Seyboth Wild	4	1

Second round
6	(Italy) L Musetti	1	4
(France) B Bonzi	6	6
(Italy) L Giustino	4	4
3	(France) A Hoang	6	6
8	(Japan) G Soeda	7	4	7^{7}
(Netherlands) T Griekspoor	5	6	6^{2}
(Italy) F Gaio	6^{4}	5
(Egypt) M Safwat	7^{7}	7

Quarterfinals
(France) B Bonzi	6^{5}	6	7
3	(France) A Hoang	7^{7}	1	5
8	(Japan) G Soeda
(Egypt) M Safwat	w/o

Semifinals
(France) B Bonzi	7^{7}	6
(Egypt) M Safwat	6^{1}	4
