= 2020 Amex-Istanbul Challenger – Doubles =

Doubles
- 2020 Amex-Istanbul Challenger

Final
- Champions: (Uruguay) Ariel Behar (Ecuador) Gonzalo Escobar
- Runners-up: (United States) Robert Galloway (United States) Nathaniel Lammons
- Score: 4–6, 6–3, [10–7]

Events
Singles	Doubles
- Amex-Istanbul Challenger

Andrey Golubev and Aleksandr Nedovyesov were the defending champions but chose not to defend their title.

Ariel Behar and Gonzalo Escobar won the title after defeating Robert Galloway and Nathaniel Lammons 4–6, 6–3, [10–7] in the final.

== Seeds ==
1. (Uruguay) Ariel Behar / (Ecuador) Gonzalo Escobar (champions)
2. (Sweden) André Göransson / (New Zealand) Artem Sitak (quarterfinals)
3. (Monaco) Romain Arneodo / (Spain) David Vega Hernández (first round)
4. (Venezuela) Luis David Martínez / (Mexico) Miguel Ángel Reyes-Varela (first round)

== Draw ==
Key

- Q = Qualifier
- WC = Wild card
- LL = Lucky loser
- Alt = Alternate
- ITF = ITF entry
- PR = Protected ranking
- SR = Special ranking
- SE = Special exempt
- JE = Junior exempt
- JR = Junior Accelerator Programme entrant
- CO = College Accelerator Programme entrant
- NG = Next Gen Accelerator Program entrant
- w/o = Walkover
- r = Retired
- d = Defaulted

First round
1	(Uruguay) A Behar (Ecuador) G Escobar	6	7^{7}
WC	(Turkey) K Kırcı (Turkey) E Kırkın	1	6^{3}
(Russia) T Gabashvili (France) M Janvier	5	7	[10]
WC	(Turkey) S Ağabigün (Turkey) A Çelikbilek	7	5	[6]
4	(Venezuela) LD Martínez (Mexico) MÁ Reyes-Varela	6^{4}	3
(Ukraine) D Molchanov (Ukraine) S Stakhovsky	7^{7}	6
(Brazil) R Matos (Brazil) F Meligeni Alves	1	6	[7]
(United States) H Reese (Poland) J Zieliński	6	4	[10]
(France) S Doumbia (France) F Reboul	6	6
WC	(Turkey) Cengiz Aksu (Bosnia and Herzegovina) A Šetkić	4	4
(Croatia) I Sabanov (Croatia) M Sabanov	5	6	[10]
3	(Monaco) R Arneodo (Spain) D Vega Hernández	7	4	[8]
(Canada) P Polansky (Kazakhstan) D Popko	1	6^{3}
(United States) R Galloway (United States) N Lammons	6	7^{7}
(Portugal) F Ferreira Silva (Belarus) I Ivashka	3	3
2	(Sweden) A Göransson (New Zealand) A Sitak	6	6

Quarterfinals
1	(Uruguay) A Behar (Ecuador) G Escobar	6	6
(Russia) T Gabashvili (France) M Janvier	4	0
(Ukraine) D Molchanov (Ukraine) S Stakhovsky	6	4	[10]
(United States) H Reese (Poland) J Zieliński	4	6	[4]
(France) S Doumbia (France) F Reboul	3	6	[7]
(Croatia) I Sabanov (Croatia) M Sabanov	6	2	[10]
(United States) R Galloway (United States) N Lammons	7	7^{7}
2	(Sweden) A Göransson (New Zealand) A Sitak	5	6^{1}

Semifinals
1	(Uruguay) A Behar (Ecuador) G Escobar	6	7^{7}
(Ukraine) D Molchanov (Ukraine) S Stakhovsky	1	6^{5}
(Croatia) I Sabanov (Croatia) M Sabanov	6^{2}	1
(United States) R Galloway (United States) N Lammons	7^{7}	6

Final
1	(Uruguay) A Behar (Ecuador) G Escobar	4	6	[10]
(United States) R Galloway (United States) N Lammons	6	3	[7]
