= 2021 Amex-Istanbul Challenger II =

- Date: 13–19 September
- Edition: 35th
- Surface: Hard
- Location: Istanbul, Turkey

Champions

Singles
- (Australia) James Duckworth

Doubles
- (Moldova) Radu Albot / (Moldova) Alexander Cozbinov
← 2021 ·	Amex-Istanbul Challenger	· 2022 →

The 2021 Amex-Istanbul Challenger II was a professional tennis tournament played on hard courts. It was the 35th edition of the tournament which was part of the 2021 ATP Challenger Tour. It took place in Istanbul, Turkey between 13 and 19 September 2021.

== Singles main-draw entrants ==
=== Seeds ===
Country	Player	Rank^{1}	Seed
AUS	James Duckworth	68	1
MDA	Radu Albot	108	2
COL	Daniel Elahi Galán	110	3
JPN	Yasutaka Uchiyama	123	4
AUS	Marc Polmans	148	5
RUS	Evgeny Donskoy	152	6
UKR	Illya Marchenko	154	7
~~EGY~~	~~Mohamed Safwat~~	~~176~~	~~8~~

- ^{1} Rankings are as of 30 August 2021.

=== Other entrants ===
The following players received wildcards into the singles main draw:

- (Turkey) Sarp Ağabigün
- (Romania) Victor Vlad Cornea
- (Turkey) Koray Kırcı

The following players received entry from the qualifying draw:

- (United States) Nick Chappell
- (Belgium) Christopher Heyman
- (France) Laurent Lokoli
- (Bosnia and Herzegovina) Aldin Šetkić

The following player received entry as a lucky loser:

- (France) Geoffrey Blancaneaux

== Champions ==
=== Singles ===
- (Australia) James Duckworth def. (Chinese Taipei) Wu Tung-lin 6–4, 6–2.

=== Doubles ===
- (Moldova) Radu Albot / (Moldova) Alexander Cozbinov def. (Croatia) Antonio Šančić / (New Zealand) Artem Sitak 4–6, 7–5, [11–9].
