= 2023 Istanbul Challenger – Doubles =

Doubles
- 2023 Istanbul Challenger

Final
- Champions: (United Kingdom) Luke Johnson (Tunisia) Skander Mansouri
- Runners-up: (Netherlands) Sander Arends (Pakistan) Aisam-ul-Haq Qureshi
- Score: 7–6^{(7–3)}, 6–3

Events
Singles	Doubles
- Istanbul Challenger

Purav Raja and Divij Sharan were the defending champions but only Sharan chose to defend his title, partnering Niki Kaliyanda Poonacha. Sharan lost in the first round to Altuğ Çelikbilek and Cem İlkel.

Luke Johnson and Skander Mansouri won the title after defeating Sander Arends and Aisam-ul-Haq Qureshi 7–6^{(7–3)}, 6–3 in the final.

== Seeds ==
1. (India) Jeevan Nedunchezhiyan / (Australia) John-Patrick Smith (semifinals)
2. (Finland) Patrik Niklas-Salminen / (Netherlands) Bart Stevens (semifinals)
3. (Netherlands) Sander Arends / (Pakistan) Aisam-ul-Haq Qureshi (final)
4. (United Kingdom) Luke Johnson / (Tunisia) Skander Mansouri (champions)

== Draw ==
Key

- Q = Qualifier
- WC = Wild card
- LL = Lucky loser
- Alt = Alternate
- ITF = ITF entry
- PR = Protected ranking
- SR = Special ranking
- SE = Special exempt
- JE = Junior exempt
- JR = Junior Accelerator Programme entrant
- CO = College Accelerator Programme entrant
- NG = Next Gen Accelerator Program entrant
- w/o = Walkover
- r = Retired
- d = Defaulted

First round
1	(India) J Nedunchezhiyan (Australia) J-P Smith	7^{15}	7^{10}
(Romania) M Copil (Romania) VV Cornea	6^{13}	6^{8}
(India) N Kaliyanda Poonacha (India) D Sharan	7^{7}	5	[7]
(Turkey) A Çelikbilek (Turkey) C İlkel	6^{1}	7	[10]
3	(Netherlands) S Arends (Pakistan) A-u-H Qureshi	3	6	[11]
(Israel) D Cukierman (United Kingdom) J Paris	6	3	[9]
PR	(Czech Republic) M Gengel (Czech Republic) D Poljak	6	5	[7]
(Netherlands) J de Jong (Netherlands) M Hermans	3	7	[10]
(South Korea) S-c Hong (South Korea) S-w Kwon	7^{7}	5	[10]
(United Kingdom) J Monday (Poland) S Walków	6^{4}	7	[8]
(Ukraine) V Orlov (Kazakhstan) D Yevseyev	1	6	[3]
4	(United Kingdom) L Johnson (Tunisia) S Mansouri	6	3	[10]
WC	(Turkey) S Ağabigün (Turkey) E Kırkın	7	3	[10]
WC	(Turkey) Y Erel (Turkey) K Kırcı	5	6	[6]
(Slovakia) L Klein (Slovakia) I Zelenay	4	7^{7}	[10]
2	(Finland) P Niklas-Salminen (Netherlands) B Stevens	6	6^{2}	[12]

Quarterfinals
1	(India) J Nedunchezhiyan (Australia) J-P Smith	1
(Turkey) A Çelikbilek (Turkey) C İlkel	0^{r}
3	(Netherlands) S Arends (Pakistan) A-u-H Qureshi	6	7^{7}
(Netherlands) J de Jong (Netherlands) M Hermans	4	6^{3}
(South Korea) S-c Hong (South Korea) S-w Kwon	5	2
4	(United Kingdom) L Johnson (Tunisia) S Mansouri	7	6
WC	(Turkey) S Ağabigün (Turkey) E Kırkın	3	2
2	(Finland) P Niklas-Salminen (Netherlands) B Stevens	6	6

Semifinals
1	(India) J Nedunchezhiyan (Australia) J-P Smith	3	7	[9]
3	(Netherlands) S Arends (Pakistan) A-u-H Qureshi	6	5	[11]
4	(United Kingdom) L Johnson (Tunisia) S Mansouri	6	6
2	(Finland) P Niklas-Salminen (Netherlands) B Stevens	4	4

Final
3	(Netherlands) S Arends (Pakistan) A-u-H Qureshi	6^{3}	3
4	(United Kingdom) L Johnson (Tunisia) S Mansouri	7^{7}	6
