= 2023 Istanbul Challenger =

- Date: 4–10 September
- Edition: 37th
- Surface: Hard
- Location: Istanbul, Turkey

Champions

Singles
- (Bosnia and Herzegovina) Damir Džumhur

Doubles
- (United Kingdom) Luke Johnson / (Tunisia) Skander Mansouri
- Istanbul Challenger

The 2023 QNB Finansbank Istanbul Challenger 75. TED Open International Tennis Tournament was a professional tennis tournament played on hardcourts. It was the 37th edition of the tournament which was part of the 2023 ATP Challenger Tour. It took place in Istanbul, Turkey between 4 and 10 September 2023.

== Singles main-draw entrants ==
=== Seeds ===
Country	Player	Rank^{1}	Seed
KOR	Kwon Soon-woo	104	1
NED	Jesper de Jong	141	2
SVK	Lukáš Klein	155	3
CRO	Dino Prižmić	176	4
BEL	Gauthier Onclin	198	5
FRA	Harold Mayot	204	6
BIH	Damir Džumhur	211	7
SVK	Norbert Gombos	217	8

- ^{1} Rankings are as of 28 August 2023.

=== Other entrants ===
The following players received wildcards into the singles main draw:

- (Turkey) Tuncay Duran
- (Turkey) Koray Kırcı
- (Turkey) Ergi Kırkın

The following players received entry from the qualifying draw:

- (Jamaica) Blaise Bicknell
- (Sweden) Leo Borg
- (Israel) Daniel Cukierman
- (United States) Martin Damm
- (Turkey) Marsel İlhan
- (Israel) Yshai Oliel

== Champions ==
=== Singles ===
- (Bosnia and Herzegovina) Damir Džumhur def. (Slovakia) Lukáš Klein 7–6^{(7–5)}, 6–3.

=== Doubles ===
- (United Kingdom) Luke Johnson / (Tunisia) Skander Mansouri def. (Netherlands) Sander Arends / (Pakistan) Aisam-ul-Haq Qureshi 7–6^{(7–3)}, 6–3.
