= 2017 Prosperita Open =

- Date: 1 – 7 May
- Edition: 14th
- Draw: 32S / 16D
- Surface: Clay
- Location: Ostrava, Czech Republic

Champions

Singles
- (Italy) Stefano Travaglia

Doubles
- (India) Jeevan Nedunchezhiyan / (Croatia) Franko Škugor
- Prosperita Open

The 2017 Prosperita Open was a professional tennis tournament played on clay courts. It was the 14th edition of the tournament which was part of the 2017 ATP Challenger Tour. It took place in Ostrava, Czech Republic between 1 and 7 May.

== Point distribution ==
Event	W	F	SF	QF	Round of 16	Round of 32	Q	Q2
Singles	90	55	33	17	8	0	5	0
Doubles	90	55	33	17	0	—N/a	—N/a	—N/a

== Singles main-draw entrants ==
=== Seeds ===
Country	Player	Rank^{1}	Seed
SVK	Norbert Gombos	105	1
CZE	Adam Pavlásek	107	2
~~ITA~~	~~Alessandro Giannessi~~	~~121~~	~~3~~
ESP	Roberto Carballés Baena	123	4
ESP	Rubén Ramírez Hidalgo	151	5
CZE	Lukáš Rosol	153	6
CZE	Jan Šátral	155	7
ITA	Marco Cecchinato	157	8

- ^{1} Rankings are as of April 24, 2017.

=== Other entrants ===
The following players received wildcards into the singles main draw:

- (Czech Republic) Dominik Kellovský
- (Czech Republic) Zdeněk Kolář
- (Czech Republic) David Poljak
- (Slovakia) Dominik Šproch

The following player received entry into the singles main draw using a protected ranking:

- (Italy) Simone Bolelli

The following players received entry from the qualifying draw:

- (Hungary) Attila Balázs
- (Morocco) Reda El Amrani
- (Austria) Lenny Hampel
- (Austria) Sebastian Ofner

The following players received entry as lucky losers:

- (Romania) Dragoș Dima
- (Spain) Carlos Taberner

== Champions ==
=== Singles ===
- (Italy) Stefano Travaglia def. (Italy) Marco Cecchinato 6–2, 3–6, 6–4.

=== Doubles ===
- (India) Jeevan Nedunchezhiyan / (Croatia) Franko Škugor def. (Australia) Rameez Junaid / (Czech Republic) Lukáš Rosol 6–3, 6–2.
