= 2020 Amex-Istanbul Challenger – Singles =

Singles
- 2020 Amex-Istanbul Challenger

Final
- Champion: (Belarus) Ilya Ivashka
- Runner-up: (Slovakia) Martin Kližan
- Score: 6–1, 6–4

Events
Singles	Doubles
← 2019 ·	Amex-Istanbul Challenger	· 2021 →

Ugo Humbert was the defending champion but chose not to defend his title.

Ilya Ivashka won the title after defeating Martin Kližan 6–1, 6–4 in the final.

== Seeds ==
1. (Spain) Pedro Martínez (withdrew)
2. (Spain) Jaume Munar (second round)
3. (Japan) Taro Daniel (first round)
4. (Russia) Evgeny Donskoy (first round, retired)
5. (Chinese Taipei) Jason Jung (quarterfinals)
6. (Italy) Lorenzo Giustino (first round)
7. (Belarus) Ilya Ivashka (champion)
8. (Egypt) Mohamed Safwat (first round)

== Draw ==
=== Key ===
- Q = Qualifier
- WC = Wild card
- LL = Lucky loser
- Alt = Alternate
- SE = Special exempt
- PR = Protected ranking
- ITF = ITF entry
- JE = Junior exempt
- w/o = Walkover
- r = Retired
- d = Defaulted
- SR = Special ranking

=== Finals ===
Semifinals
(Slovakia) Martin Kližan	6	7
Q	(Croatia) Borna Gojo	4	5
(France) Benjamin Bonzi	6	2	3
7	(Belarus) Ilya Ivashka	3	6	6

Final
(Slovakia) Martin Kližan	1	4
7	(Belarus) Ilya Ivashka	6	6

=== Top half ===
First round
LL	(Russia) A Vatutin	6	3	1
Q	(Croatia) N Serdarušić	4	6	6
Q	(United States) M McDonald	6	6
LL	(Russia) T Gabashvili	4	1
(Ukraine) I Marchenko	6^{6}	3
(Slovakia) M Kližan	7^{8}	6
(Italy) R Marcora	7^{8}	6
8	(Egypt) M Safwat	6^{6}	0
3	(Japan) T Daniel	6	6^{4}	6^{3}
Q	(Croatia) B Gojo	2	7^{7}	7^{7}
(Ukraine) S Stakhovsky	4	0
(United Kingdom) J Clarke	6	6
(Austria) S Ofner	6^{7}	6	6
WC	(Turkey) M İlhan	7^{9}	4	4
WC	(Turkey) A Çelikbilek	6	6
6	(Italy) L Giustino	0	3

Second round
Q	(Croatia) N Serdarušić	6^{9}	3
Q	(United States) M McDonald	7^{11}	6
(Slovakia) M Kližan	7^{7}	6
(Italy) R Marcora	6^{3}	1
Q	(Croatia) B Gojo	6^{5}	7	6
(United Kingdom) J Clarke	7^{7}	5	2
(Austria) S Ofner	4	7	6
WC	(Turkey) A Çelikbilek	6	5	3

Quarterfinals
Q	(United States) M McDonald	6	4	3
(Slovakia) M Kližan	4	6	6
Q	(Croatia) B Gojo	6	1
(Austria) S Ofner	3	0^{r}

Semifinals
(Slovakia) M Kližan	6	7
Q	(Croatia) B Gojo	4	5

=== Bottom half ===
First round
5	(Chinese Taipei) J Jung	2
(Uzbekistan) D Istomin	2^{r}
Q	(France) T Lamasine	4	6	7
(Canada) P Polansky	6	2	5
(Ecuador) E Gómez	4	7^{8}	5
(France) M Janvier	6	6^{6}	7
(France) B Bonzi	6	4
4	(Russia) E Donskoy	2	1^{r}
7	(Belarus) I Ivashka	6	6
WC	(Turkey) E Kırkın	2	4
(France) E Benchetrit	4	3
(Turkey) C İlkel	6	6
(Portugal) F Ferreira Silva	2	6^{3}
(Kazakhstan) D Popko	6	7^{7}
(Sweden) E Ymer	3	3
2	(Spain) J Munar	6	6

Second round
5	(Chinese Taipei) J Jung	6	6
Q	(France) T Lamasine	0	3
(France) M Janvier	2	5
(France) B Bonzi	6	7
7	(Belarus) I Ivashka	6	6
(Turkey) C İlkel	2	2
(Kazakhstan) D Popko	6	6
2	(Spain) J Munar	3	4

Quarterfinals
5	(Chinese Taipei) J Jung	6^{6}	2
(France) B Bonzi	7^{8}	6
7	(Belarus) I Ivashka	6	6
(Kazakhstan) D Popko	4	0

Semifinals
(France) B Bonzi	6	2	3
7	(Belarus) I Ivashka	3	6	6
