= 2021 Amex-Istanbul Challenger – Doubles =

Doubles
- 2021 Amex-Istanbul Challenger

Final
- Champions: (Sweden) André Göransson (Netherlands) David Pel
- Runners-up: (United Kingdom) Lloyd Glasspool (Finland) Harri Heliövaara
- Score: 4–6, 6–3, [10–8]

Events
| Singles | Doubles |
- Amex-Istanbul Challenger

Ariel Behar and Gonzalo Escobar were the defending champions but chose not to defend their title.

André Göransson and David Pel won the title after defeating Lloyd Glasspool and Harri Heliövaara 4–6, 6–3, [10–8] in the final.

== Seeds ==
1. (Israel) Jonathan Erlich / (Belarus) Andrei Vasilevski (semifinals)
2. (Sweden) André Göransson / (Netherlands) David Pel (champions)
3. (United States) Nathaniel Lammons / (United States) Jackson Withrow (first round)
4. (Netherlands) Sander Arends / (Czech Republic) Roman Jebavý (first round)

== Draw ==
Key

- Q = Qualifier
- WC = Wild card
- LL = Lucky loser
- Alt = Alternate
- ITF = ITF entry
- PR = Protected ranking
- SR = Special ranking
- SE = Special exempt
- JE = Junior exempt
- JR = Junior Accelerator Programme entrant
- CO = College Accelerator Programme entrant
- NG = Next Gen Accelerator Program entrant
- w/o = Walkover
- r = Retired
- d = Defaulted

First round
1 | (Israel) J Erlich (Belarus) A Vasilevski | 6 | 7^{7}
(India) P Raja (India) R Ramanathan | 1 | 6^{3}
WC | (Turkey) A Çelikbilek (Turkey) C İlkel | 7^{7} | 6
(United States) E King (United States) N Pasha | 6^{5} | 3
3 | (United States) N Lammons (United States) J Withrow | 6^{1} | 4
(United Kingdom) L Glasspool (Finland) H Heliövaara | 7^{7} | 6
(Venezuela) LD Martínez (Spain) D Vega Hernández | 3 | 7^{7} | [8]
(Czech Republic) Z Kolář (Poland) S Walków | 6 | 6^{3} | [10]
WC | (Turkey) S Ağabigün (Turkey) E Kırkın | 3 | 7^{7} | [10]
(United States) R Galloway (United States) A Lawson | 6 | 6^{5} | [12]
(Colombia) DE Galán (Ecuador) E Gómez | 7 | 7
4 | (Netherlands) S Arends (Czech Republic) R Jebavý | 5 | 5
(Switzerland) L Margaroli (Ukraine) D Molchanov | 5 | 6 | [6]
(France) A Hoang (France) A Olivetti | 7 | 4 | [10]
WC | (Turkey) M İlhan (Tunisia) M Jaziri | 6^{2} | 5
2 | (Sweden) A Göransson (Netherlands) D Pel | 7^{7} | 7

Quarterfinals
1 | (Israel) J Erlich (Belarus) A Vasilevski | 6 | 6
WC | (Turkey) A Çelikbilek (Turkey) C İlkel | 2 | 3
(United Kingdom) L Glasspool (Finland) H Heliövaara | 6 | 6
(Czech Republic) Z Kolář (Poland) S Walków | 4 | 3
(United States) R Galloway (United States) A Lawson | 6 | 6^{5} | [10]
(Colombia) DE Galán (Ecuador) E Gómez | 3 | 7^{7} | [6]
(France) A Hoang (France) A Olivetti | 7^{7} | 4 | [5]
2 | (Sweden) A Göransson (Netherlands) D Pel | 6^{5} | 6 | [10]

Semifinals
1 | (Israel) J Erlich (Belarus) A Vasilevski | 6^{5} | 3
(United Kingdom) L Glasspool (Finland) H Heliövaara | 7^{7} | 6
(United States) R Galloway (United States) A Lawson | 6^{4} | 1
2 | (Sweden) A Göransson (Netherlands) D Pel | 7^{7} | 6

Final
(United Kingdom) L Glasspool (Finland) H Heliövaara | 6 | 3 | [8]
2 | (Sweden) A Göransson (Netherlands) D Pel | 4 | 6 | [10]
