= 2020 Amex-Istanbul Challenger =

- Date: 19–25 October
- Edition: 33rd
- Surface: Hard
- Location: Istanbul, Turkey

Champions

Singles
- (Belarus) Ilya Ivashka

Doubles
- (Uruguay) Ariel Behar / (Ecuador) Gonzalo Escobar
- Amex-Istanbul Challenger

The 2020 Amex-Istanbul Challenger was a professional tennis tournament played on hard courts. It was the 33rd edition of the tournament which was part of the 2020 ATP Challenger Tour. It took place in Istanbul, Turkey between 19 and 25 October 2020.

== Singles main-draw entrants ==
=== Seeds ===
| Country | Player | Rank^{1} | Seed |
|---|---|---|---|
| ~~ESP~~ | ~~Pedro Martínez~~ | ~~97~~ | ~~1~~ |
| ESP | Jaume Munar | 112 | 2 |
| JPN | Taro Daniel | 120 | 3 |
| RUS | Evgeny Donskoy | 121 | 4 |
| TPE | Jason Jung | 127 | 5 |
| ITA | Lorenzo Giustino | 140 | 6 |
| BLR | Ilya Ivashka | 141 | 7 |
| EGY | Mohamed Safwat | 146 | 8 |

- ^{1} Rankings are as of 12 October 2020.

=== Other entrants ===
The following players received wildcards into the singles main draw:

- (Turkey) Altuğ Çelikbilek
- (Turkey) Marsel İlhan
- (Turkey) Ergi Kırkın

The following players received entry from the qualifying draw:

- (Croatia) Borna Gojo
- (France) Tristan Lamasine
- (United States) Mackenzie McDonald
- (Croatia) Nino Serdarušić

The following players received entry as lucky losers:

- (Russia) Teymuraz Gabashvili
- (Russia) Alexey Vatutin

== Champions ==
=== Singles ===
- (Belarus) Ilya Ivashka def. (Slovakia) Martin Kližan 6–1, 6–4.

=== Doubles ===
- (Uruguay) Ariel Behar / (Ecuador) Gonzalo Escobar def. (United States) Robert Galloway / (United States) Nathaniel Lammons 4–6, 6–3, [10–7].
