= Radu Albot =

Moldovan tennis player (born 1989)

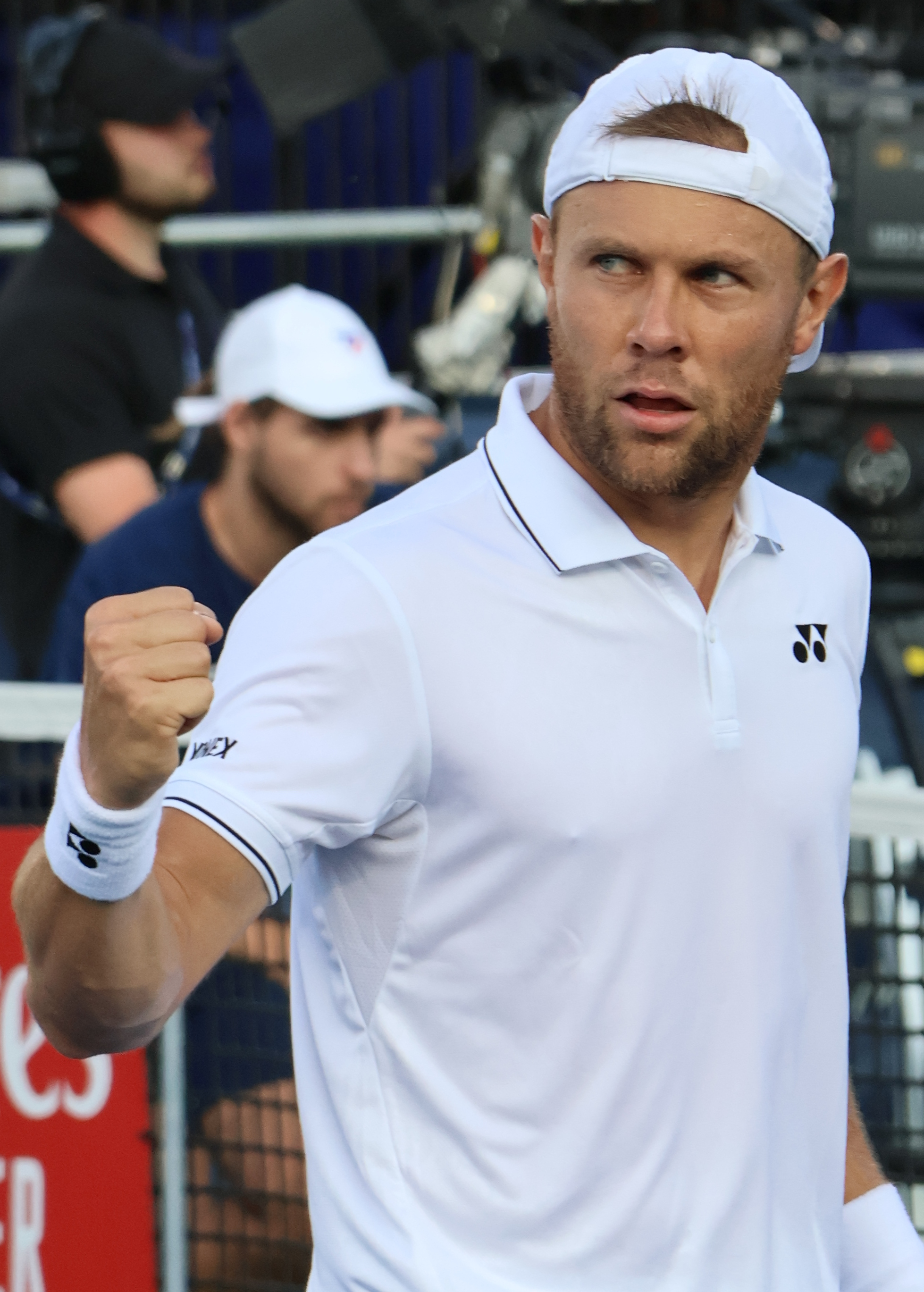
- Albot at the 2023 Washington Open
- Country (sports): Moldova
- Residence: Chișinău, Moldova
- Born: 11 November 1989 (age 36) Chișinău, Moldavian SSR, Soviet Union
- Height: 1.75 m (5 ft 9 in)
- Turned pro: 2008
- Plays: Right-handed (two-handed backhand)
- Coach: Burghard Riehemann, Vladimir Albot
- Prize money: US $5,496,614

Singles
- Career record: 107–148
- Career titles: 1
- Highest ranking: No. 39 (5 August 2019)
- Current ranking: No. 418 (8 June 2026)

Grand Slam singles results
- Australian Open: 3R (2021, 2022)
- French Open: 2R (2018, 2019, 2020, 2023)
- Wimbledon: 3R (2018)
- US Open: 3R (2017)

Doubles
- Career record: 51–73
- Career titles: 1
- Highest ranking: No. 56 (29 April 2019)

Grand Slam doubles results
- Australian Open: 3R (2018, 2019)
- French Open: QF (2015)
- Wimbledon: 3R (2022)
- US Open: SF (2018)

Team competitions
- Davis Cup: 48–18
- Last updated on: 16 June 2026.

Radu Albot (born 11 November 1989) is a Moldovan professional tennis player. He achieved a career high ranking of No. 39 on 5 August 2019, making him the highest ranked player from Moldova. He is the first player from Moldova to win ATP Tour titles in singles (2019 Delray Beach Open) and in doubles (2015 Istanbul Open). He is also the first Moldovan to break into the top 100 on 27 July 2015 and four years later in the top 50. He is currently the No. 1 Moldovan player. He finished in the top 100 in the year-end rankings for five years (2016, 2017, 2018, 2019, 2020). His year-end career high was world No. 46 achieved in 2019.

Albot has won one ATP singles and one doubles title, 9 singles and 10 doubles Challenger titles in his career, as well as 14 singles and 7 doubles Futures titles. He has been a regular member of the Moldovan Davis Cup team since 2007 and holds his country's records for the most singles wins (34) and total wins (48).

== Personal life ==
Albot became a father on 19 April 2020, after his girlfriend Doina, gave birth to daughter Adeline.

== Career ==
=== 2013–16: Historic maiden ATP title and top 100 ===
Radu Albot has achieved many firsts for a Moldovan professional tennis player. In September 2013 he won the ATP Challenger event in Fergana, Uzbekistan, becoming the first player from his country to win an ATP Challenger tournament. At the 2014 US Open, he won three straight matches in the men's qualifying tournament to gain a berth in the main draw, becoming the first Moldovan to play in the main draw of a Grand Slam.

In May 2015, Albot teamed up with Dušan Lajović to win the doubles title at the inaugural 2015 Istanbul Open, becoming the first Moldovan to win an ATP Tour level event. In October 2015, Albot together with his doubles partner František Čermák managed to reach the 2015 Kremlin Cup final, being defeated by Andrey Rublev and Dmitry Tursunov in the decisive set. In June 2016, he won the Fergana Challenger for the second time. Next he qualified for the 2016 Wimbledon Championships and won his first Grand Slam match in 4 attempts, defeating Gastão Elias in the first round.

=== 2017–19: Historic ATP singles title & top 40 & Major doubles semifinal ===
In June 2017, Radu Albot reached the quarterfinals of the 2017 Antalya Open beating João Sousa and Paolo Lorenzi, before losing to Andreas Seppi in straight sets. In the same year, he played for the first time in the main draw of all four Grand Slam tournaments. He was a direct entry into the Australian Open, French Open and Wimbledon tournaments. Albot qualified for the 2017 US Open tournament and won two main draw matches before being defeated by Sam Querrey in the third round, his best singles finish at a Grand Slam to date.

In February 2018, Radu Albot reached the quarterfinals of the 2018 New York Open, winning matches against Bjorn Fratangelo and John Isner, but being eliminated by Kei Nishikori in the decisive third set. He equalled his Grand Slam third round achievement at the 2018 Wimbledon Championships, defeating 20th seed Pablo Carreño Busta and Aljaz Bedene before eventually losing in the third round to John Isner. At the 2018 US Open, he and partner Malek Jaziri reached the doubles semifinals. Albot became the first Moldovan to reach the second week and also the semifinal at a Grand Slam.

In September 2018, he reached his first ATP Tour level singles semifinals at the 2018 Moselle Open where he lost against the eventual tournament champion, Gilles Simon.

Albot finished the 2018 season ranked in the top 100 at world No. 99.

In 2019, Albot reached the semifinals of the 2019 Open Sud de France tournament, beating Philipp Kohlschreiber, Ernests Gulbis and Marcos Baghdatis, before losing to the eventual tournament champion Jo-Wilfried Tsonga.

In late February, he won the 2019 Delray Beach Open, making history as the first Moldovan to win an ATP singles title, knocking out Ivo Karlović, Nick Kyrgios, Steve Johnson and Mackenzie McDonald. In the final he defeated Dan Evans of Great Britain in a closely fought three-set match. At the same tournament he reached the semifinals in doubles with Japanese Yoshihito Nishioka. In March in Miami he continued his great form. Albot was the only man to take a set off the eventual champion, Roger Federer, in the whole tournament during their second round match.

In May, Albot reached the 2019 Geneva Open semifinal losing in the penultimate round against Nicolás Jarry. In August, seeded seventh, he reached his third semifinal of 2019 at the 2019 Los Cabos Open, losing to fifth seed Taylor Fritz. His three victories in the tournament put him at a total of 25 for the year, his most ATP Tour wins in a season. As a result he reached his highest career ranking in the top 40 of world No. 39 on 5 August 2019.

=== 2020–21: Inaugural ATP Cup, Australian Open third round, struggles with form ===
In January 2020, Albot participated in the Inaugural 2020 ATP Cup in the Group stage as a member of the Moldovan team. He snapped an eighth -match losing streak at the opening round of Roland Garros and reached the quarterfinals at the 2020 Sofia Open with a win over top seed Denis Shapovalov.

Albot reached the third round at the 2021 Australian Open for the first time at this Major where he defeated World No. 13 Roberto Bautista Agut en route before losing to 24th seed Casper Ruud. In February, seeded sixth, he made his first semifinal in 19 months and of the year at the 2021 Singapore Tennis Open where he lost to Alexander Bublik. After eight first rounds losses he dropped out of the top 100 on 2 August 2021.

He finished with a 6-15 ATP win–loss record for the 2021 season, ranked No. 125.

=== 2022–23: Major third round, back to Masters & top 100, 100th win ===
Albot reached the main draw at the 2022 Australian Open as a qualifier, and defeated Yoshihito Nishioka and Australian wildcard Aleksandar Vukic. He lost to Alexander Zverev in straight sets in the third round.

He won the title at the 2022 Istanbul Challenger defeating Lukáš Rosol. As a result, he moved back into the 100 to No. 92 on 19 September 2022.

He finished the 2022 season ranked No. 106.

He lost in the first round of the qualifications at the 2023 Australian Open to American Brandon Holt. At the 2023 Delray Beach Open he reached his first ATP semifinal since February 2021 by defeating Fernando Verdasco, Aleksandar Vukic and second seed Tommy Paul, which was his seventh top-20 career win and 99th career win overall. In the semifinals, he lost against fourth seed Miomir Kecmanović. As a result, he returned to the top 100 at No. 99 on 20 February 2023. In March, he entered the main draw of the 2023 BNP Paribas Open as a lucky loser directly into the second round, replacing 15th seed Pablo Carreño Busta who withdrew in the last minute.

In May, he qualified for the 2023 French Open and won his first round match against American wildcard Patrick Kypson. It was his 101st career win, having recorded his 100th match win earlier at the Banja Luka Open in April. He also qualified for the 2023 Wimbledon Championships.

He finished the 2023 season ranked No. 131.

=== 2024: Back to top 150, tenth US Open appearance ===
Ranked No. 137, he qualified for the main draw at the 2024 Delray Beach Open and won his first round match against #NextGenATP player Juncheng Shang. He also qualified for the main draw at the 2024 Țiriac Open and defeated Aleksandar Kovacevic. He lost to another #NextGenATP player, wildcard João Fonseca in the second round.

Ranked No. 144, he qualified for the 2024 Wimbledon Championships. Ranked No. 152, he also qualified for the Citi Open in Washington D.C., defeating Eliot Spizzirri and fourth qualifying seed Terence Atmane. He won his first round match over Facundo Díaz Acosta.

Ranked No. 138, he qualified for the US Open, making his tenth appearance, and 30th at a Grand Slam overall, defeating Javier Barranco Cosano, No. 10 qualifying seed Luca Van Assche and Shintaro Mochizuki. He lost in the first round in straight sets against Novak Djokovic in his first meeting with the defending champion. With previous career wins over Marko Djokovic and Djordje Djokovic, Albot is the only player to have played a professional singles match against each of all three Djokovic brothers."Radu Albot VS Djordje Djokovic | Head 2 Head | H2H | ATP Tour | Tennis". ATP Tour.

=== 2025–26: Challenger results, home semifinal, and Davis Cup wins ===
In April 2025, Albot lost to eighth seed Camilo Ugo Carabelli in the first round of the Țiriac Open in Bucharest."Wawrinka records first ATP Tour win of season in Bucharest". ATP Tour. 1 April 2025.

At the Perugia Challenger, he defeated former world No. 3 Stan Wawrinka 6–4, 7–6(3)."Watch Challenger TV: Wawrinka in action". ATP Tour. 11 July 2025.

In May 2026, Albot entered the ATP Challenger Moldova Open in Chișinău as a wildcard."Moldova Open 2026 Draws". ATP Tour. He defeated qualifier Maxime Janvier in the first round, 6–3, 0–0 ret. In the second round, he defeated eighth seed Timofey Skatov 1–6, 6–1, 6–4. He then beat Franco Agamenone 7–5, 7–6(2) in the quarterfinals, and lost in the semifinals to qualifier Cezar Crețu 2–6, 6–4, 2–6.

In June 2026, Albot represented Moldova at the Davis Cup Europe Group III event at the National Tennis Centre in Chișinău, helping Moldova earn promotion to the 2027 World Group II Play-offs with wins over North Macedonia, Georgia, Kosovo and Latvia. Albot won singles rubbers against Saba Purtseladze, Jasin Jakupi and Robert Strombachs, including a 6–3, 6–2 win over Strombachs in Moldova's 2–0 win over Latvia.

== Performance timelines ==
Key
W	F	SF	QF	#R	RR	Q#	DNQ	A	NH

(W) winner; (F) finalist; (SF) semifinalist; (QF) quarterfinalist; (#R) rounds 4, 3, 2, 1; (RR) round-robin stage; (Q#) qualification round; (DNQ) did not qualify; (A) absent; (NH) not held; (SR) strike rate (events won / competed); (W–L) win–loss record.
To avoid confusion and double counting, these charts are updated at the conclusion of a tournament or when the player's participation has ended.

=== Singles ===
Current through the 2024 US Open.

Tournament	2009	2010	2011	2012	2013	2014	2015	2016	2017	2018	2019	2020	2021	2022	2023	2024	2025	SR	W–L	Win%
Grand Slam tournaments
Australian Open	A	A	A	Q2	Q2	Q1	Q2	Q2	1R	1R	2R	A	3R	3R	Q1	Q1	Q1	0 / 5	5–5	50%
French Open	A	A	A	A	A	Q1	Q2	1R	1R	2R	2R	2R	1R	Q2	2R	Q2	A	0 / 7	4–7	36%
Wimbledon	A	A	A	Q1	Q1	Q1	Q1	2R	2R	3R	1R	NH	1R	1R	1R	1R	A	0 / 8	4–8	33%
US Open	A	A	A	Q2	Q1	1R	1R	1R	3R	1R	1R	1R	1R	Q1	1R	1R	A	0 / 10	2–10	17%
Win–loss	0–0	0–0	0–0	0–0	0–0	0–1	0–1	1–3	3–4	3–4	2–4	1–2	2–4	2–2	1–3	0–2		0 / 30	15–30	33%
ATP Masters 1000
Indian Wells Masters	A	A	A	A	A	A	A	A	1R	1R	3R	NH	A	Q1	2R	A	Q2	0 / 4	2–4	33%
Miami Open	A	A	A	A	A	A	A	A	1R	2R	2R	NH	1R	Q1	Q2	A	A	0 / 4	2–4	33%
Monte-Carlo Masters	A	A	A	A	A	A	A	A	Q1	A	2R	NH	A	Q1	A	A	A	0 / 1	1–1	50%
Madrid Open	A	A	A	A	A	A	A	A	A	A	1R	NH	Q1	A	A	Q2	A	0 / 1	0–1	0%
Italian Open	A	A	A	A	A	A	A	A	A	A	2R	Q1	A	A	A	Q2	A	0 / 1	1–1	50%
Canadian Open	A	A	A	A	A	A	A	A	A	A	2R	NH	A	A	Q2	A	A	0 / 1	1–1	50%
Cincinnati Masters	A	A	A	A	A	A	A	A	Q1	A	2R	Q1	A	A	A	A	A	0 / 1	1–1	50%
Shanghai Masters	A	A	A	A	A	A	A	A	Q2	Q2	1R	NH			A	A	A	0 / 1	0–1	0%
Paris Masters	A	A	A	A	A	A	Q1	Q2	A	A	3R	2R	A	A	A	A	A	0 / 2	3–2	60%
Win–loss	0–0	0–0	0–0	0–0	0–0	0–0	0–0	0–0	0–2	1–2	9–9	1–1	0–1	0–0	0–1	0–0	0–0	0 / 16	11–16	41%
Career statistics
Tournaments	0	0	0	0	0	4	4	11	17	23	27	10	15	10	12	6	1	total: 140		
Titles	0	0	0	0	0	0	0	0	0	0	1	0	0	0				total: 1		
Finals	0	0	0	0	0	0	0	0	0	0	1	0	0	0				total: 1		
Overall win–loss	1–2	0–0	0–0	2–2	5–1	7–4	2–5	4–11	9–17	12–23	31–26	7–13	6–15	9–10	7–12	5–7	0–1	1 / 140	107–148	42%
Year-end ranking	726	503	281	225	169	168	121	97	87	98	46	93	125	106	131	163	448	$5,496,614		

=== Doubles ===
Tournament	2015	2016	2017	2018	2019	2020	2021	2022	SR	W–L	Win &
Grand Slam tournaments
Australian Open	A	1R	A	3R (Note: Retired of tournament, doesn't count as a lost match.)	3R	A	2R	A	0 / 4	5–3	63%
French Open	QF	A	1R	A	1R	1R	A	A	0 / 4	3–4	43%
Wimbledon	1R	A	A	1R	1R	NH	1R	3R	0 / 5	2–5	29%
US Open	1R	A	A	SF	2R	A	A	A	0 / 3	5–3	63%
Win–loss	3–3	0–1	0–1	6–2	3–4	0–1	1–2	2–1	0 / 16	15–15	50%
ATP Masters 1000
Miami Open	A	A	A	A	2R	NH	A	A	0 / 1	1–1	43%
Monte-Carlo Masters	A	A	A	A	QF	NH	A	A	0 / 1	2–1	67%
Madrid Open	A	A	A	A	1R	NH	A	A	0 / 1	0–1	0%
Italian Open	A	A	A	A	1R	A	A		0 / 1	0–1	0%
Canadian Open	A	A	A	A	1R	NH	A		0 / 1	0–1	0%
Cincinnati Masters	A	A	A	A	1R	A	A		0 / 1	0–1	0%
Shanghai Masters	A	A	A	A	1R	NH			0 / 1	0–1	0%
Win–loss	0–0	0–0	0–0	0–0	3–7	0–0	0–0	0–0	0 / 7	3–7	30%

== ATP Tour career finals ==
=== Singles: 1 (1 title) ===
Legend (singles) Grand Slam tournaments (0–0) ATP Finals (0–0) ATP Tour Masters 1000 (0–0) ATP Tour 500 Series (0–0) ATP Tour 250 Series (1–0)	Finals by surface Hard (1–0) Clay (0–0) Grass (0–0)	Finals by setting Outdoor (1–0) Indoor (0–0)

Result	W–L	Date	Tournament	Tier	Surface	Opponent	Score
Win	1–0	Feb 2019	Delray Beach Open, United States	250 Series	Hard	(United Kingdom) Dan Evans	3–6, 6–3, 7–6^{(9–7)}

=== Doubles: 2 (1-1) ===
Legend (doubles) Grand Slam tournaments (0–0) ATP Finals (0–0) ATP Tour Masters 1000 (0–0) ATP Tour 500 Series (0–0) ATP Tour 250 Series (1–1)	Finals by surface Hard (0–1) Clay (1–0) Grass (0–0)	Finals by setting Outdoor (1–1) Indoor (0–0)

Result	W–L	Date	Tournament	Tier	Surface	Partner	Opponents	Score
Win	1–0	May 2015	Istanbul Open, Turkey	250 Series	Clay	(Serbia) Dušan Lajović	(Sweden) Robert Lindstedt (Austria) Jürgen Melzer	6–4, 7–6^{(7–2)}
Loss	1–1	Oct 2015	Kremlin Cup, Russia	250 Series	Hard (i)	(Czech Republic) František Čermák	(Russia) Andrey Rublev (Russia) Dmitry Tursunov	6–2, 1–6, [6–10]

== ATP Challenger and ITF Tour finals ==
=== Singles: 36 (23–13) ===
Legend (singles) ATP Challenger Tour (9–8) Futures/ITF World Tennis Tour (14–5)	Finals by surface Hard (17–6) Clay (6–7)

Result	W–L	Date	Tournament	Tier	Surface	Opponent	Score
Loss	0–1	Jun 2010	Romania F3, Bacău	Futures	Clay	(France) Florian Reynet	1–6, 3–6
Loss	0–2	Oct 2010	Turkey F9, Antalya	Futures	Hard	(Australia) Sam Groth	3–6, 1–6
Win	1–2	Oct 2010	Turkey F11, Antalya	Futures	Hard	(Ukraine) Denys Molchanov	6–3, 4–6, 7–5
Win	2–2	Mar 2011	Turkey F7, Antalya	Futures	Clay	(South Africa) Ruan Roelofse	7–5, 6–4
Win	3–2	Apr 2011	Turkey F11, Antalya	Futures	Clay	(Colombia) Alejandro González	7–5, 6–3
Win	4–2	Apr 2011	Turkey F12, Antalya	Futures	Hard	(Belgium) Yannik Reuter	6–3, 7–6^{(7–1)}
Win	5–2	Apr 2011	Turkey F13, Antalya	Futures	Hard	(Germany) Peter Gojowczyk	6–3, 6–2
Win	6–2	May 2011	Italy F11, Cesena	Futures	Clay	(Italy) Walter Trusendi	2–6, 6–2, 7–6^{(7–1)}
Loss	6–3	Feb 2012	Turkey F6, Antalya	Futures	Hard	(United Kingdom) Daniel Smethurst	6–3, 5–7, 0–6
Win	7–3	Feb 2012	Turkey F7, Antalya	Futures	Hard	(Russia) Aleksandr Lobkov	7–6^{(7–5)}, 6–3
Win	8–3	Mar 2012	Turkey F8, Antalya	Futures	Hard	(Hungary) Ádám Kellner	7–6^{(7–5)}, 6–2
Win	9–3	Apr 2012	Turkey F12, Antalya	Futures	Hard	(Spain) Sergio Gutiérrez Ferrol	6–1, 6–3
Win	10–3	Apr 2012	Turkey F15, Antalya	Futures	Hard	(Bosnia and Herzegovina) Tomislav Brkić	6–1, 4–6, 6–1
Win	11–3	Apr 2012	Turkey F16, Antalya	Futures	Hard	(Bosnia and Herzegovina) Tomislav Brkić	3–6, 6–4, 7–6^{(7–3)}
Loss	11–4	May 2012	Romania F1, Cluj	Futures	Clay	(Poland) Marcin Gawron	1–6, 3–6
Win	12–4	Jun 2012	Romania F3, Bacău	Futures	Clay	(Moldova) Roman Borvanov	7–5, 6–4
Loss	12–5	Feb 2013	Turkey F7, Antalya	Futures	Hard	(Belgium) Yannik Reuter	6–7^{(4–7)}, 6–3, 2–6
Win	13–5	Mar 2013	Turkey F8, Antalya	Futures	Hard	(United States) Reid Carleton	6–1, 6–4
Win	14–5	Mar 2013	Turkey F9, Antalya	Futures	Hard	(Turkey) Marsel İlhan	6–3, 3–6, 7–6^{(9–7)}
Loss	14–6	May 2013	Qarshi, Uzbekistan	Challenger	Hard	(Russia) Teymuraz Gabashvili	4–6, 4–6
Win	15–6	Sep 2013	Fergana, Uzbekistan	Challenger	Hard	(Serbia) Ilija Bozoljac	7–6^{(11–9)}, 6–7^{(3–7)}, 6–1
Loss	15–7	Sep 2014	Sibiu, Romania	Challenger	Clay	(Australia) Jason Kubler	4–6, 1–6
Win	16–7	Mar 2015	Kolkata, India	Challenger	Hard	(Australia) James Duckworth	7–6^{(7–0)}, 6–1
Loss	16–8	Jun 2015	Moscow, Russia	Challenger	Clay	(Spain) Daniel Muñoz de la Nava	0–6, 1–6
Loss	16–9	Jul 2015	Poznań, Poland	Challenger	Clay	(Spain) Pablo Carreño Busta	4–6, 4–6
Loss	16–10	Aug 2015	Prague, Czechia	Challenger	Clay	(Brazil) Rogério Dutra Silva	2–6, 7–6^{(7–5)}, 4–6
Win	17–10	Jun 2016	Furth, Germany	Challenger	Clay	(Germany) Jan-Lennard Struff	6–3, 6–4
Win	18–10	Jun 2016	Fergana (2), Uzbekistan	Challenger	Hard	(Russia) Konstantin Kravchuk	6–4, 6–2
Win	19–10	Jul 2016	Poznań, Poland	Challenger	Clay	(Belgium) Clement Geens	6–2, 6–4
Loss	19–11	Oct 2017	Suzhou, China	Challenger	Hard	(Serbia) Miomir Kecmanović	4–6, 4–6
Win	20–11	Nov 2017	Shenzhen, China	Challenger	Hard	(Poland) Hubert Hurkacz	7–6^{(8–6)}, 6–7^{(3–7)}, 6–4
Win	21–11	Oct 2018	Liuzhou, China	Challenger	Hard	(Serbia) Miomir Kecmanović	6–2, 4–6, 6–3
Win	22–11	Nov 2021	Pau, France	Challenger	Hard (i)	(Czech Republic) Jiří Lehečka	6–2, 7–6^{(7–5)}
Win	23–11	Sep 2022	Istanbul, Turkey	Challenger	Hard	(Czech Republic) Lukáš Rosol	6–2, 6–0
Loss	23–12	Oct 2022	Busan, South Korea	Challenger	Hard	(Poland) Kamil Majchrzak	4–6, 6–3, 2–6
Loss	23–13	Mar 2024	Girona, Spain	Challenger	Clay	(Spain) Pedro Martinez	5–7, 4–6

=== Doubles: 37 (17-20) ===
Legend (doubles) ATP Challenger Tour (10–8) Futures/ITF World Tennis Tour (7–12)	Finals by surface Hard (6–4) Clay (11–16)

Result	W–L	Date	Tournament	Tier	Surface	Partner	Opponents	Score
Loss	0–1	Aug 2007	Germany F13, Munchen	Futures	Clay	(Germany) Torsten Wietoska	(Germany) David Klier (Germany) Philipp Piyamongkol	walkover
Loss	0–2	Jun 2008	Romania F6, Bacău	Futures	Clay	(Moldova) Andrei Ciumac	(Romania) Teodor-Dacian Crăciun (Romania) Victor Ioniță	2–6, 6–3, [7–10]
Loss	0–3	Jul 2008	Romania F11, Bucharest	Futures	Clay	(Moldova) Andrei Ciumac	(Ukraine) Vladislav Bondarenko (Hungary) Robert Varga	2–6, 6–7^{(2–7)}
Loss	0–4	Jul 2008	Romania F13, Târgu Mureș	Futures	Clay	(Moldova) Andrei Ciumac	(Italy) Andrea Arnaboldi (Ukraine) Vladislav Bondarenko	7–5, 0–6, [1–10]
Win	1–4	Aug 2008	Romania F14, Oradea	Futures	Clay	(Moldova) Andrei Ciumac	(Australia) Steven Goh (Australia) Zakary van Min	7–6^{(7–5)}, 6–7^{(5–7)}, [10–3]
Loss	1–5	Apr 2009	Egypt F5, Suiz	Futures	Clay	(Romania) Teodor-Dacian Crăciun	(Russia) Andrey Kuznetsov (Hungary) Robert Varga	2–6, 4–6
Loss	1–6	May 2009	Romania F1, Cralova	Futures	Clay	(Moldova) Andrei Ciumac	(Romania) Petru-Alexandru Luncanu (Romania) Marius Copil	5–7, 1–6
Win	2–6	May 2009	Romania F2, Bucharest	Futures	Clay	(Moldova) Andrei Ciumac	(Romania) Florin Mergea (Romania) Costin Pavăl	6–1, 6–2
Loss	2–7	Jun 2009	Romania F5, Bacău	Futures	Clay	(Moldova) Andrei Ciumac	(Germany) Tobias Klein (Switzerland) Alexander Sadecky	4–6, 3–6
Win	3–7	Sep 2009	Germany F17, Kempten	Futures	Clay	(Czech Republic) Jiří Školoudík	(Australia) James Lemke (Germany) Richard Waite	6–1, 6–2
Win	4–7	May 2010	Romania F2, Pitești	Futures	Clay	(Moldova) Andrei Ciumac	(Ukraine) Ivan Anikanov (Ukraine) Artem Smirnov	2–6, 6–3, [10–7]
Loss	4–8	Aug 2010	Romania F9, Arad	Futures	Clay	(Moldova) Andrei Ciumac	(Romania) Alexandru-Daniel Carpen (Romania) Alexandru Catalin Marasin	4–6, 5–7
Loss	4–9	Sep 2010	Brașov, Romania	Challenger	Clay	(Moldova) Andrei Ciumac	(Italy) Daniele Giorgini (Italy) Flavio Cipolla	3–6, 4–6
Win	5–9	Mar 2011	Turkey F8, Antalya	Futures	Hard	(Ukraine) Denys Molchanov	(Czech Republic) Roman Jebavý (Slovakia) Adrian Sikora	6–7^{(3–7)}, 6–3, [12–10]
Loss	5–10	Mar 2011	Turkey F10, Antalya	Futures	Clay	(Moldova) Andrei Ciumac	(Croatia) Toni Androić (Croatia) Dino Marcan	1–6, 2–6
Win	6–10	May 2011	Italy F10, Aosta	Futures	Clay	(Japan) Yasutaka Uchiyama	(Japan) Hiroki Moriya (Japan) Shuichi Sekiguchi	4–6, 7–5, [10–7]
Loss	6–11	Aug 2011	Samarkand, Uzbekistan	Challenger	Clay	(Russia) Andrey Kuznetsov	(Russia) Alexander Kudryavtsev (Russia) Mikhail Elgin	6–7^{(4–7)}, 6–2, [7–10]
Loss	6–12	Aug 2011	Romania F9, Brașov	Futures	Clay	(Moldova) Andrei Ciumac	(Romania) Adrian Cruciat (Romania) Teodor-Dacian Crăciun	0–6, 6–3, [7–10]
Loss	6–13	Feb 2012	Turkey F6, Antalya	Futures	Hard	(Moldova) Andrei Ciumac	(Belgium) Germain Gigounon (Belgium) Yannik Reuter	6–7^{(6–8)}, 4–6
Loss	6–14	Feb 2012	Turkey F7, Antalya	Futures	Hard	(Moldova) Andrei Ciumac	(Belgium) Jorisde Loore (Belgium) Yannik Reuter	3–6, 6–7^{(6–8)}
Win	7–14	Apr 2012	Mersin, Turkey	Challenger	Clay	(Ukraine) Denys Molchanov	(Italy) Alessandro Motti (Italy) Simone Vagnozzi	6–0, 6–2
Win	8–14	May 2012	Ostrava, Czech Republic	Challenger	Clay	(Russia) Teymuraz Gabashvili	(Czech Republic) Adam Pavlásek (Czech Republic) Jiří Veselý	7–5, 5–7, [10–8]
Loss	8–15	Apr 2013	Mersin, Turkey	Challenger	Clay	(Ukraine) Oleksandr Nedovyesov	(Germany) Andreas Beck (Germany) Dominik Meffert	7–5, 3–6, [8–10]
Loss	8–16	May 2013	Samarkand, Uzbekistan	Challenger	Clay	(Australia) Jordan Kerr	(Uzbekistan) Farrukh Dustov (Ukraine) Oleksandr Nedovyesov	1–6, 6–7^{(7–9)}
Win	9–16	Oct 2013	Kazan, Russia	Challenger	Hard	(Uzbekistan) Farrukh Dustov	(Belarus) Egor Gerasimov (Belarus) Dzmitry Zhyrmont	6–2, 6–7^{(3–7)}, [10–7]
Win	10–16	Mar 2014	China F1, Guangzhou	Futures	Hard	(Indonesia) Christopher Rungkat	(Italy) Claudio Grassi (Italy) Ricadro Ghedin	1–6, 7–5, [10–7]
Win	11–16	Apr 2014	Mersin, Turkey	Challenger	Clay	(Czech Republic) Jaroslav Pospíšil	(Italy) Thomas Fabbiano (Italy) Matteo Viola	7–6^{(9–7)}, 6–1
Win	12–16	May 2014	Rome, Italy	Challenger	Clay	(New Zealand) Artem Sitak	(Italy) Andrea Arnaboldi (Italy) Flavio Cipolla	4–6, 6–2, [11–9]
Loss	12–17	Jun 2014	Arad, Romania	Challenger	Clay	(Australia) Artem Sitak	(Croatia) Franko Škugor (Croatia) Antonio Velc	4–6, 6–7^{(3–7)}
Win	13–17	Jul 2014	Poznań, Poland	Challenger	Clay	(Czech Republic) Adam Pavlásek	(Poland) Tomasz Bednarek (Finland) Henri Kontinen	7–5, 2–6, [10–8]
Loss	13–18	Jul 2014	Oberstaufen, Germany	Challenger	Clay	(Poland) Mateusz Kowalczyk	(Netherlands) Wesley Koolhof (Italy) Alessandro Motti	6–7^{(7–9)}, 3–6
Win	14–18	Aug 2014	San Marino, San Marino	Challenger	Clay	(Spain) Enrique López Pérez	(Croatia) Franko Škugor (Romania) Adrian Ungur	6–4, 6–1
Loss	14–19	Feb 2015	Burnie, Australia	Challenger	Hard	(Australia) Matthew Ebden	(Australia) Carsten Ball (Australia) Matt Reid	5–7, 4–6
Win	15–19	Feb 2015	Launceston, Australia	Challenger	Hard	(United States) Mitchell Krueger	(Australia) Adam Hubble (New Zealand) Rubin Statham	3–6, 7–5, [11–9]
Win	16–19	Oct 2017	Ningbo, China	Challenger	Hard	(New Zealand) Rubin Statham	(India) Jeevan Nedunchezhiyan (Indonesia) Christopher Rungkat	7–5, 6–3
Loss	16–20	Mar 2018	Irving, United States	Challenger	Hard	(Australia) Matthew Ebden	(Austria) Alexander Peya (Germany) Philipp Petzschner	2–6, 4–6
Win	17–20	Sep 2021	Istanbul, Turkey	Challenger	Hard	(Moldova) Alexander Cozbinov	(Croatia) Antonio Šančić (New Zealand) Artem Sitak	4–6, 7–5, [11–9]

== Best Grand Slam results details ==
Australian Open
2021 Australian Open
Round	Opponent	Score
1R	(Spain) Roberto Bautista Agut (12)	6–7^{(1–7)}, 6–0, 6–4, 7–6^{(7–5)}
2R	(Australia) Christopher O'Connell (WC)	6–2, 7–5, 7–6^{(10–8)}
3R	(Norway) Casper Ruud (24)	1–6, 7–5, 4–6, 4–6
2022 Australian Open (Qualifier)
Round	Opponent	Score
Q1	(Italy) Filippo Baldi (PR)	7–6^{(8–6)}, 6–2
Q2	(Japan) Yosuke Watanuki	6–1, 2–6, 6–2
Q3	(Portugal) João Sousa (17)	6–4, 6–4
1R	(Japan) Yoshihito Nishioka	6–3, 6–4, 4–6, 6–2
2R	(Australia) Aleksandar Vukic (WC)	6–4, 7–6^{(7–4)}, 6–4
3R	(Germany) Alexander Zverev (3)	3–6, 4–6, 4–6

French Open
2018 French Open
Round	Opponent	Score
1R	(France) Grégoire Barrère (WC)	4–6, 0–6, 7–5, 6–1, 6–2
2R	(Bosnia and Herzegovina) Damir Džumhur (26)	3–6, 3–6, 7–5, 6–1, 5–7
2019 French Open
Round	Opponent	Score
1R	(United States) Tennys Sandgren (Q)	7–6^{(7–3)}, 7–6^{(7–1)}, 3–6, 6–1
2R	(Germany) Jan-Lennard Struff	6–7^{(2–7)}, 6–7^{(3–7)}, 7–6^{(7–4)}, 2–6
2020 French Open
Round	Opponent	Score
1R	(Australia) Jordan Thompson	6–2, 6–4, 6–1
2R	(United States) Taylor Fritz (27)	3–6, 2–6, 4–6

Wimbledon Championships
2018 Wimbledon
Round	Opponent	Score
1R	(Spain) Pablo Carreño Busta (20)	3–6, 6–0, 6–7^{(5–7)}, 6–2, 6–1
2R	(Slovenia) Aljaž Bedene	6–2, 4–6, 7–6^{(7–3)}, 5–7, 6–3
3R	(United States) John Isner (9)	3–6, 3–6, 4–6

US Open
2017 US Open (Qualifier)
Round	Opponent	Score
Q1	(Portugal) João Domingues	6–0, 6–1
Q2	(Chile) Cristian Garín	6–4, 6–4
Q3	(Canada) Frank Dancevic (PR)	6–2, 6–4
1R	(United States) Ernesto Escobedo	7–5, 4–6, 6–2, 6–4
2R	(Chinese Taipei) Lu Yen-hsun	6–2, 7–6^{(9–7)}, 5–7, 0–6, 7–6^{(7–2)}
3R	(United States) Sam Querrey (17)	6–4, 2–6, 4–6, 4–6

== Record against other players ==
=== Record against top 10 players ===
Albot's record against players that have been in the ATP top 10, with active players in bold.

Opponent	Highest ranking	Matches	Won	Lost	Win %	Last match
Number 1 ranked players						
(Russia) **Daniil Medvedev**	1	1	0	1	0%	Lost (3–6, 1–6) at 2019 Monte Carlo Masters 2R
(Switzerland) **Roger Federer**	1	2	0	2	0%	Lost (0–6, 3–6) at 2019 Swiss Indoors 2R
Number 3 ranked players						
(Croatia) **Marin Čilić**	3	2	1	1	50%	Won (6–4, 7–6^{(8–6)}) at 2019 Cincinnati 1R
(Bulgaria) **Grigor Dimitrov**	3	1	0	1	0%	Lost (2–6, 3–6) at 2020 ATP Cup RR
(Spain) David Ferrer	3	1	0	1	0%	Lost (6–4, 5–7, 1–6, 0–6) at 2015 US Open 1R
(Greece) **Stefanos Tsitsipas**	3	1	0	1	0%	Lost (6–7^{(2–7)}, 2–6) at 2018 Indian Wells Masters 1R
(Germany) **Alexander Zverev**	3	2	0	2	0%	Lost (3–6, 4–6, 4–6) at 2022 Australian Open 3R
Number 4 ranked players						
(Japan) **Kei Nishikori**	4	1	0	1	0%	Lost (6–4, 3–6, 1–6) at 2018 New York Open QF
Number 5 ranked players						
(South Africa) Kevin Anderson	5	1	0	1	0%	Lost (4–6, 3–6) at 2018 Acapulco 1R
(Russia) **Andrey Rublev**	5	1	0	1	0%	Lost (1–6, 2–6) at 2020 Paris Masters 2R
(France) **Jo-Wilfried Tsonga**	5	1	0	1	0%	Lost (1–6, 3–6) at 2019 Montpellier SF
Number 6 ranked players						
(France) **Gilles Simon**	6	3	1	2	33%	Won (6–4, 6–2) at 2019 Montreal 1R
(France) **Gaël Monfils**	6	1	0	1	0%	Lost (6–4, 4–6, 1–6) at 2019 Paris Masters 3R
(Italy) **Matteo Berrettini**	6	2	0	2	0%	Lost (3–6, 7–6^{(7–3)}, 1–6) at 2018 Kitzbühel 2R
Number 7 ranked players						
(Norway) **Casper Ruud**	7	2	0	2	0%	Lost (1–6, 7–5, 4–6, 4–6) at 2021 Australian Open 3R
(Spain) **Fernando Verdasco**	7	3	0	3	0%	Lost (2–6, 6–3, 1–6) at 2019 Mutua Madrid Open 1R
(Belgium) **David Goffin**	7	4	0	4	0%	Lost (4–6, 1–6) at 2020 ATP Cup RR
Number 8 ranked players						
(Cyprus) Marcos Baghdatis	8	1	1	0	100%	Won (6–2, 7–6^{(7–2)}) at 2019 Montpellier QF
(Serbia) Janko Tipsarević	8	1	1	0	100%	Won (7–5, 2–6, 6–0) at 2019 Los Cabos 1R
(Russia) Mikhail Youzhny	8	1	1	0	100%	Won (4–6, 7–6^{(8–6)}, 7–5) at 2017 Gstaad 1R
(United States) **John Isner**	8	4	1	3	25%	Lost (3–6, 3–6, 4–6) at 2018 Wimbledon 3R
(Argentina) **Diego Schwartzman**	8	1	0	1	0%	Lost (4–6, 2–6) at 2019 Cincinnati Masters 3R
(United States) **Jack Sock**	8	2	0	2	0%	Lost (6–3, 3–6, 6–7^{(2–7)}) at 2020 Delray Beach 1R
Number 9 ranked players						
(Spain) **Roberto Bautista Agut**	9	1	1	0	100%	Won (6–7^{(1–7)}, 6–0, 6–4, 7–6^{(7–5)}) at 2021 Australian Open 2R
(Spain) Nicolás Almagro	9	2	1	1	50%	Won (7–6^{(8–6)}, 6–3) at 2017 Marrakesh 1R
(Italy) **Fabio Fognini**	9	3	1	2	33%	Lost (6–7^{(6–8)}, 3–6) at 2019 Rome Masters 2R
Number 10 ranked players						
(Latvia) **Ernests Gulbis**	10	1	1	0	100%	Won (7–6^{(7–5)}, 4–6, 6–4) at 2019 Montpellier 2R
(Canada) **Denis Shapovalov**	10	1	1	0	100%	Won (6–2, 6–4) at 2020 Sofia 2R
(Spain) **Pablo Carreño Busta**	10	2	1	1	50%	Lost (3–6, 4–6) at 2019 Chengdu 1R
Total		49	12	37	24%	* Statistics correct as of 5 May 2022
