= Lukáš Rosol =

Czech tennis player (born 1985)

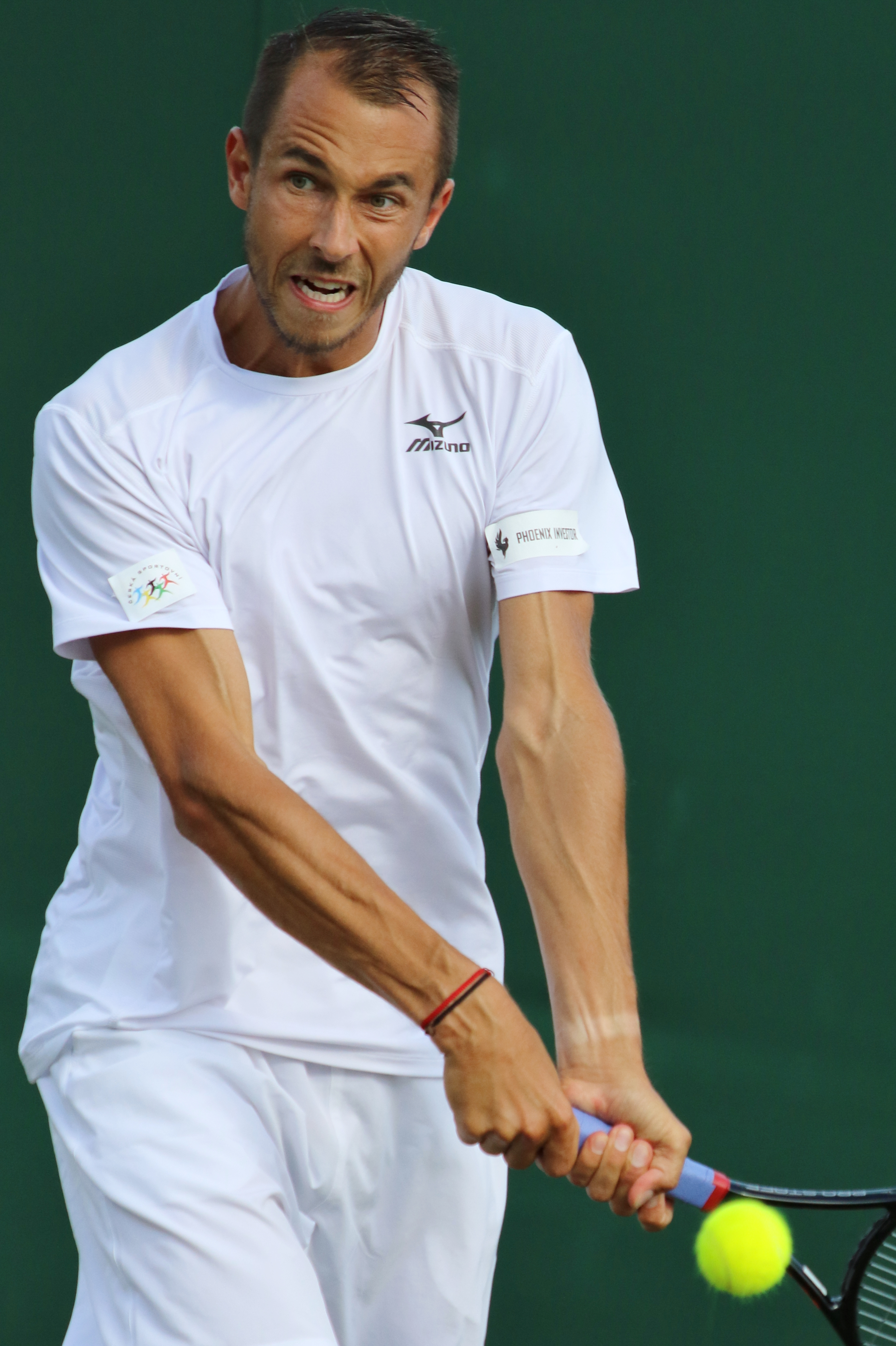
- Rosol at the 2017 Wimbledon
- Country (sports): Czech Republic
- Residence: Prague, Czech Republic
- Born: 24 July 1985 (age 41) Brno, Czechoslovakia
- Height: 1.93 m (6 ft 4 in)
- Turned pro: 2004
- Retired: 2024
- Plays: Right-handed (two-handed backhand)
- Prize money: US$4,717,412

Singles
- Career record: 123–160
- Career titles: 2
- Highest ranking: No. 26 (22 September 2014)

Grand Slam singles results
- Australian Open: 3R (2016)
- French Open: 3R (2011, 2015)
- Wimbledon: 3R (2012)
- US Open: 2R (2015)

Doubles
- Career record: 75–90 (at ATP Tour level, Grand Slam level, and in Davis Cup)
- Career titles: 3
- Highest ranking: No. 37 (13 October 2014)

Grand Slam doubles results
- Australian Open: 1R (2012, 2013, 2014, 2015, 2016)
- French Open: QF (2015)
- Wimbledon: 2R (2012, 2013, 2014, 2016)
- US Open: 2R (2014)

Grand Slam mixed doubles results
- Wimbledon: 1R (2014)

Team competitions
- Davis Cup: W (2012, 2013)
- Last updated on: 12 February 2024.

Lukáš Rosol (Czech pronunciation: [ˈlukaːʃ ˈrosol]; born 24 July 1985) is a Czech former professional tennis player. His career-high singles ranking is world No. 26, achieved on 22 September 2014.

His first notable victory was against world No. 8, Jürgen Melzer, at the 2011 French Open, whom he defeated in five sets in the second round a year after Melzer had reached the semifinal. A year later, Rosol defeated world No. 2, Rafael Nadal, in the second round of Wimbledon to achieve one of the biggest wins in his career. Rosol has had sustained success since then having played an integral part in the Czech Republic's Davis Cup winning team in 2012, and winning his first tour-level title in April 2013.

Rosol also played in the longest ever ATP doubles match, alongside Tomáš Berdych, defeating Marco Chiudinelli and Stanislas Wawrinka in the first round of the 2013 Davis Cup. The match was played on 2 February 2013, lasting 7 hours, 1 minute. It was the second longest ATP match of any kind, after the Isner–Mahut match at the 2010 Wimbledon Championships.

Rosol announced his retirement in April 2024.

== Coaching ==
Rosol was coached by former Czech player, 1999 US Open quarterfinalist Ctislav "Sláva" Doseděl.

== Personal life ==
Rosol was born in Brno, Czechoslovakia. In November 2008, he married Czech athlete Denisa Rosolová (née Ščerbová). In 2011, they divorced. In 2013, Rosol became engaged to news presenter Michaela Ochotská. Their son André was born in January 2015. The pair married in July 2015 and were divorced in July 2017. In 2018 Rosol entered into his third marriage with Petra Kubinová. His surname means jelly in Czech.

== Tennis career ==
Rosol has won eight Challenger and seven Futures tournaments. In April 2013, he won his first tour-level tournament, the BRD Nastase Tiriac Trophy ATP World Tour 250, and in August 2014, he won his first tour-level tournament on hard courts, the Winston-Salem Open.

=== 2012 ===
Rosol rose to prominence in 2012 at the Wimbledon Championships, after having participated in the Wimbledon qualifying draw multiple times, not reaching the main draw until then. In the first round, he defeated Ivan Dodig, then he was drawn against the two-time champion and world No. 2, Rafael Nadal. After losing the first set in a very close tiebreak, Rosol regrouped and broke in the first game of the second. A dominant serving performance allowed him to take the second set 6–4. Rosol's service game held up in the third set, where he capitalized on a sloppy game by Nadal and took the set 6–4. Down two sets to one, Nadal raised his level in the fourth, taking the set 6–2 and sending the match into a deciding fifth set. At this point the match was delayed by 35 minutes in order to close the Centre Court roof. Rosol returned from the break revitalized, taking the fifth set 6–4 by striking 20 winners to two unforced errors. His groundstroke speed averaged 85 mph and peaked at 114 mph. In the final game of the match, Rosol delivered three aces and a forehand winner to close out one of the greatest upsets in Grand Slam history by a score of 6–7^{(9–11)}, 6–4, 6–4, 2–6, 6–4. He went on to lose his third-round match against Philipp Kohlschreiber in straight sets.

In the doubles draw, Rosol and partner Mikhail Kukushkin defeated the British duo of Colin Fleming and Ross Hutchins in five sets in the first round. They lost in the second round to James Cerretani and Édouard Roger-Vasselin.

=== 2013 ===
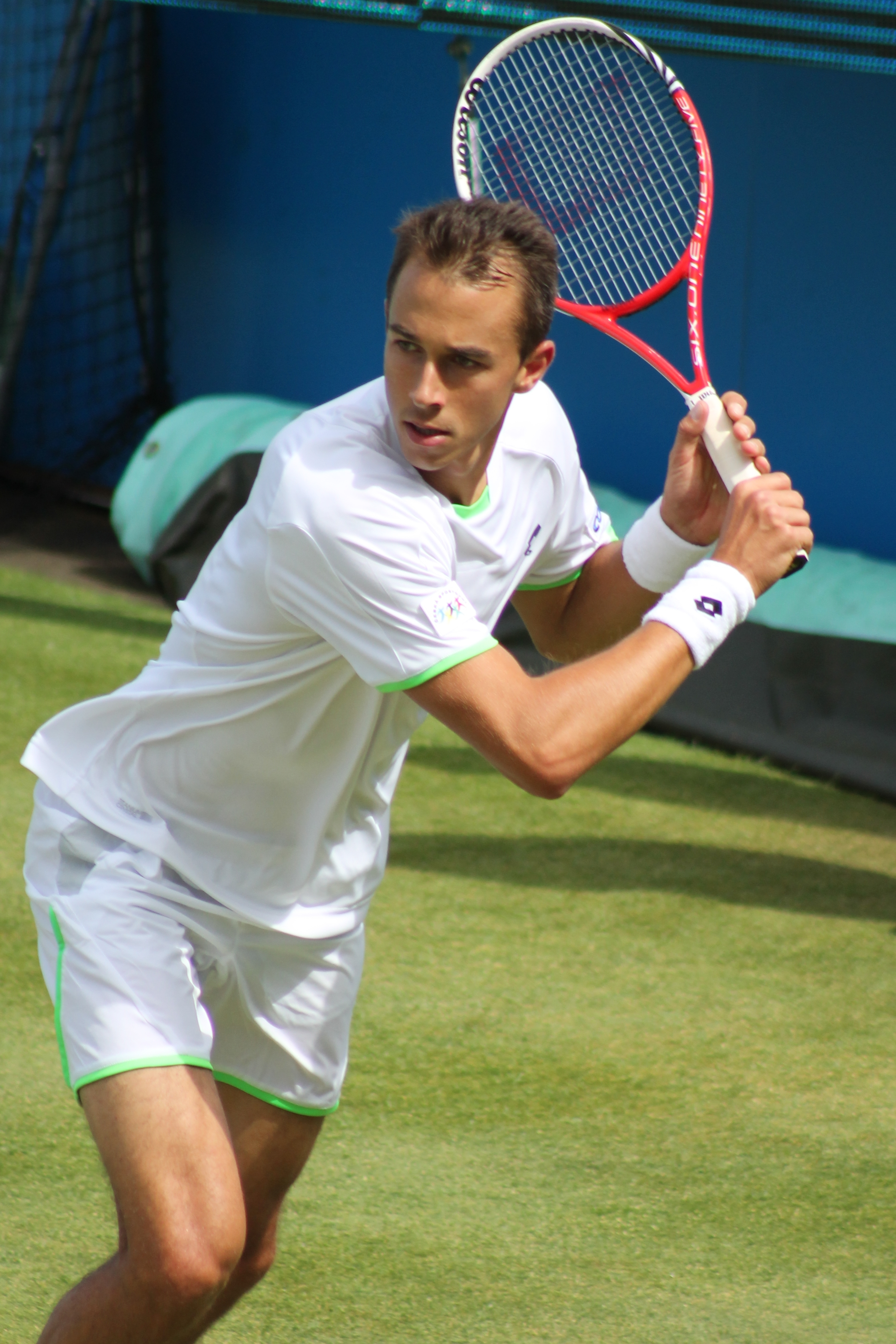
Rosol at the 2013 Aegon Championships.

At the Australian Open, Rosol defeated Jamie Baker in the first round before he lost to 13th seed Milos Raonic in the second.

In April, he won his first ATP Tour singles tournament with a victory in Bucharest. He was unseeded in the tournament and beat three seeded players en route to the final: third seed Andreas Seppi, eighth seed Viktor Troicki and second seed Gilles Simon. In the final, he defeated Guillermo García López, only dropping one set throughout the entire tournament and tearfully dedicating the triumph to his father Emil, who introduced him to tennis and had died two weeks before the tournament.

At the French Open, Rosol lost in the second round to Fabio Fognini in four sets.

=== 2014: Career-high ranking ===
Rosol began his 2014 season at the Qatar Open in Doha, losing in straight sets to eventual champion Rafael Nadal. He reached the second round in the Apia International Sydney, and the quarterfinals of the Dubai Tennis Championships, where he lost to eventual champion Roger Federer.

At Indian Wells, Rosol faced reigning Wimbledon champion Andy Murray in the second round and was defeated in three sets after leading by a set and a break.

At Wimbledon, he was one point from a two-set lead against Rafael Nadal in the second round, but Nadal came back to win in four sets.

At the Mercedes Cup in Stuttgart, Rosol reached the final beating Mikhail Youzhny along the way, in the final he lost in three sets to Roberto Bautista Agut.

In August, Rosol won his second ATP title at the Winston-Salem Open, defeating Jerzy Janowicz in three sets. Lukas moved up to a career-high ranking of No. 26 in the world, a career high, in the ATP rankings released 22 September 2014.

=== 2015 ===
In 2015, he was the 28th seed but lost in second round of the Australian Open in five sets to Dudi Sela. At Indian Wells, he was the 27th seed and thus received a bye into the second round and defeated Martin Kližan and Robin Haase to reach the fourth round, his best showing at a Masters 1000 level in his career, where he lost to Tomáš Berdych. At Miami, he was the 26th seed and once again received a bye into the second round, where he beat qualifier and future top ten Alexander Zverev. In the third round, he lost to David Ferrer in straight sets.

At the French Open, Rosol defeated seeded player Bautista Agut to reach the third round. He also reached his first Grand Slam quarterfinal in doubles with Radu Albot.

At Wimbledon, Rosol defeated former No. 10 player Ernests Gulbis to reach the second round, where he fell to Pablo Andújar in five sets.

=== 2016 ===
At the 2016 Australian Open he reached the third round, his best showing in this Grand Slam in his career where he lost to Stan Wawrinka.

In February he participated in the inaugural edition of the Sofia Open netting the first win of the event against Robin Haase. He was defeated by 7th seed Martin Kližan in the second round.

In May ranked No. 68, he reached the quarterfinals of the 2016 Geneva Open defeating John Isner. He defeated Andrey Kuznetsov (tennis) to reach the semifinals before losing again to top seed and eventual champion Stan Wawrinka.

=== 2022: First Wimbledon main draw participation in 5 years ===
He qualified for the main draw at the 2022 Wimbledon Championships after five years of absence. It was his first main draw participation at Wimbledon since 2017.

He reached the final at the 2022 Istanbul Challenger where he lost to Radu Albot. As a result, he moved back into the top 250 at No. 239 on 19 September 2022.

== Controversies ==
He has had several confrontations with top-ten players including Andy Murray and Rafael Nadal. He deliberately knocked over one of Nadal's water bottles at the changeover – Nadal being known to be particularly superstitious about his water bottle placement. He also shouldered Andy Murray at a changeover. Murray said later in the match, loud enough to be heard by the audience and television microphones "No-one likes you on the tour. Everybody hates you."

== Performance timelines ==
Key
W	F	SF	QF	#R	RR	Q#	P#	DNQ	A	Z#	PO	G	S	B	NMS	NTI	P	NH

(W) winner; (F) finalist; (SF) semifinalist; (QF) quarterfinalist; (#R) rounds 4, 3, 2, 1; (RR) round-robin stage; (Q#) qualification round; (P#) preliminary round; (DNQ) did not qualify; (A) absent; (Z#) Davis/Fed Cup Zonal Group (with number indication) or (PO) play-off; (G) gold, (S) silver or (B) bronze Olympic/Paralympic medal; (NMS) not a Masters tournament; (NTI) not a Tier I tournament; (P) postponed; (NH) not held; (SR) strike rate (events won / competed); (W–L) win–loss record.
To avoid confusion and double counting, these charts are updated at the conclusion of a tournament or when the player's participation has ended.

=== Singles ===
Current through the 2022 ATP Tour

Tournament	2007	2008	2009	2010	2011	2012	2013	2014	2015	2016	2017	2018	2019	2020	2021	2022	SR	W–L	Win%
Grand Slam tournaments
Australian Open	Q1	Q2	A	A	Q1	1R	2R	1R	2R	3R	A	A	Q2	Q3	Q1		0 / 5	4–5	44%
French Open	A	Q2	Q3	Q2	3R	2R	2R	1R	3R	1R	Q1	A	1R	Q2	Q1		0 / 7	6–7	50%
Wimbledon	Q1	Q1	Q1	Q1	Q1	3R	1R	2R	2R	1R	2R	A	Q3	NH	Q1	1R	0 / 7	5–7	45%
US Open	Q2	A	Q3	1R	1R	Q3	1R	1R	2R	1R	Q1	Q1	Q3	A	Q1		0 / 6	1–6	14%
Win–loss	0–0	0–0	0–0	0–1	2–2	3–3	2–4	1–4	5–4	2–4	1–1	0–0	0–1	0–0	0–0	0–1	0 / 25	16–25	41%
ATP World Tour Masters 1000
Indian Wells Masters	A	A	A	A	A	1R	1R	2R	4R	1R	Q1	A	Q2	NH	A		0 / 5	3–5	38%
Miami Masters	A	A	A	Q1	Q2	3R	2R	1R	3R	1R	Q1	A	Q1	NH	A		0 / 5	4–5	44%
Monte Carlo Masters	A	A	A	A	A	Q1	A	3R	1R	1R	A	A	A	NH	A		0 / 3	2–3	40%
Madrid Masters	A	A	A	A	A	A	A	1R	1R	A	A	A	A	NH	A		0 / 2	0–2	0%
Rome Masters	A	A	A	A	A	A	1R	2R	1R	A	A	A	A	A	A		0 / 3	1–3	25%
Canada Masters	A	A	A	A	A	A	1R	A	2R	A	A	A	A	NH	A		0 / 2	1–2	33%
Cincinnati Masters	A	A	A	A	A	A	1R	A	1R	Q2	A	A	A	A	A		0 / 2	0–2	0%
Shanghai Masters	A	A	A	A	A	A	2R	1R	A	1R	A	A	A	NH			0 / 3	1–3	25%
Paris Masters	A	A	A	A	Q1	A	2R	1R	2R	Q2	A	A	A	A	A		0 / 3	2–3	40%
Win–loss	0–0	0–0	0–0	0–0	0–0	2–2	3–7	4–7	5–8	0–4	0–0	0–0	0–0	0–0	0–0		0 / 28	14–28	33%
Career statistics
	2007	2008	2009	2010	2011	2012	2013	2014	2015	2016	2017	2018	2019	2020	2021	2022	Career		
Tournaments	1	2	1	2	13	18	26	27	28	23	3	2	3	1	0	2	Career total: 152		
Titles	0	0	0	0	0	0	1	1	0	0	0	0	0	0	0		Career total: 2		
Finals	0	0	0	0	0	0	1	3	0	0	0	0	0	0	0		Career total: 4		
Overall win–loss	0–1	1–2	0–1	0–2	6–13	19–18	23–27	29–29	20–30	16–24	3–4	4–2	1–4	1–1	0–0	0–2	2 / 152	123–160	44%
Year-end ranking	271	182	148	164	70	73	47	31	55	113	203	142	180	199	271	216	$4,717,412		

=== Doubles ===
Tournament	2011	2012	2013	2014	2015	2016	2017	2018	2019	2020	2021	W–L
Grand Slam tournaments
Australian Open	A	1R	1R	1R	1R	1R	A	A	A	A	A	0–5
French Open	A	A	1R	1R	QF	2R	A	A	A	A	A	4–4
Wimbledon	1R	2R	2R	2R	1R	2R	A	A	A	NH	A	4–6
US Open	1R	A	1R	2R	1R	A	A	A	A	A	A	1–4
Win–loss	0–2	1–2	1–4	2–4	3–4	2–3	0–0	0–0	0–0	0–0	0–0	9–19

== ATP career finals ==
=== Singles: 4 (2 titles, 2 runner-ups) ===
Legend Grand Slam tournaments (0–0) ATP World Tour Masters 1000 (0–0) ATP World Tour 500 Series (0–0) ATP World Tour 250 Series (2–2)	Finals by surface Hard (1–0) Clay (1–2) Grass (0–0) Carpet (0–0)

Result	W–L	Date	Tournament	Surface	Opponent	Score
Win	1–0	Apr 2013	Romanian Open, Romania	Clay	(Spain) Guillermo García López	6–3, 6–2
Loss	1–1	Apr 2014	Romanian Open, Romania	Clay	(Bulgaria) Grigor Dimitrov	6–7^{(2–7)}, 1–6
Loss	1–2	Jul 2014	Stuttgart Open, Germany	Clay	(Spain) Roberto Bautista Agut	3–6, 6–4, 2–6
Win	2–2	Aug 2014	Winston-Salem Open, United States	Hard	(Poland) Jerzy Janowicz	3–6, 7–6^{(7–3)}, 7–5

=== Doubles: 3 (3 titles) ===
Legend Grand Slam tournaments (0–0) ATP World Tour Masters 1000 (0–0) ATP World Tour 500 Series (0–0) ATP World Tour 250 Series (3–0)	Finals by surface Hard (2–0) Clay (1–0) Grass (0–0) Carpet (0–0)

Result	W–L	Date	Tournament	Surface	Partner	Opponents	Score
Win	1–0	Jan 2012	Qatar Open, Qatar	Hard	(Slovakia) Filip Polášek	(Germany) Christopher Kas (Germany) Philipp Kohlschreiber	6–3, 6–4
Win	2–0	Oct 2013	Vienna Open, Austria	Hard (i)	(Romania) Florin Mergea	(Canada) Daniel Nestor (Austria) Julian Knowle	7–5, 6–4
Win	3–0	Jul 2014	Croatia Open, Croatia	Clay	(Czech Republic) František Čermák	(Serbia) Dušan Lajović (Croatia) Franko Škugor	6–4, 7–6^{(7–5)}

== Wins against top-10 players per season ==
- He has a 4–26 record against players who were, at the time the match was played, ranked in the top 10.

Season	2011	2012	2013	2014	2015	2016	2017	2018	2019	Total
Wins	1	1	0	0	1	1	0	0	0	4

=== Wins over top-ten players per season ===
No.	Player	Rank	Event	Surface	Rd	Score
2011
1.	(Austria) Jürgen Melzer	8	French Open, France	Clay	2R	6–7^{(4–7)}, 6–4, 4–6, 7–6^{(7–3)}, 6–4
2012
2.	(Spain) Rafael Nadal	2	Wimbledon, UK	Grass	2R	6–7^{(9–11)}, 6–4, 6–4, 2–6, 6–4
2015
3.	(France) Jo-Wilfried Tsonga	10	Vienna Open, Austria	Hard	2R	6–4, 3–6, 6–1
2016
4.	(France) Jo-Wilfried Tsonga	10	Davis Cup, Třinec, Czech Republic	Hard (i)	QF	6–4, 3–6, 4–6, 7–6^{(10–8)}, 6–4

== Challenger and Futures/World Tennis Tour Finals ==
=== Singles: 30 (18–12) ===
Legend (singles) ATP Challenger Tour (9–5) ITF Futures/World Tennis Tour (9–7)	Titles by surface Hard (7-7) Clay (9–4) Grass (0–0) Carpet (2–1)

Result	W–L	Date	Tournament	Tier	Surface	Opponent	Score
Loss	0-1	Aug 2005	Hungary F5, Szolnok	Futures	Clay	(Hungary) Kornél Bardóczky	2-6, 1-6
Loss	0-2	Mar 2006	Poland F2, Wrocław	Futures	Hard (i)	(Monaco) Thomas Oger	3–6, 6–2, 6–7^{(4–7)}
Win	1-2	Mar 2006	Poland F3, Zabrze	Futures	Hard (i)	(Russia) Alexandre Krasnoroutskiy	6–3, 6–3
Loss	1-3	Jul 2006	Germany F8, Trier	Futures	Clay	(Belgium) Niels Desein	6–2, 6–7^{(1–7)}, 4–6
Loss	1-4	Jul 2006	Belgium F1, Waterloo	Futures	Clay	(Slovakia) Pavol Červenák	4-6, 4–6
Loss	1-5	Aug 2006	Poland F10, Poznań	Futures	Clay	(Czech Republic) Jan Minář	4-6, 3–6
Win	2-5	Oct 2006	France F18, La Roche-sur-Yon	Futures	Hard (i)	(France) Julien Jeanpierre	7–5, 6–3
Win	3-5	Dec 2006	Czech Republic F5, Opava	Futures	Carpet (i)	(United Kingdom) Joshua Goodall	6–7^{(5–7)}, 6–4, 7–6^{(10–8)}
Win	4-5	May 2007	Czech Republic F1, Teplice	Futures	Clay	(Czech Republic) Martin Vacek	6–7^{(4–7)}, 6–4, 6–4
Win	5-5	May 2007	Uzbekistan F2, Namangan,	Futures	Hard	(Chinese Taipei) Wang Yeu-tzuoo	7–6^{(7–2)}, 6–4
Win	6-5	Oct 2007	France F18, La Roche-sur-Yon	Futures	Hard (i)	(France) Adrian Mannarino	6–4, 3–6, 6–4
Loss	6-6	Dec 2007	Czech Republic F6, Opava	Futures	Carpet (i)	(Slovakia) Karol Beck	6–2, 5–7, 5–7
Win	7-6	Jun 2008	Košice, Slovakia	Challenger	Clay	(Spain) Miguel Ángel López Jaén	7–5, 6–1
Win	8-6	Feb 2009	Germany F4, Mettmann	Futures	Carpet (i)	(France) Stéphane Robert	7–6^{(8–6)}, 6–4
Win	9-6	Mar 2009	Bergamo, Italy	Challenger	Hard (i)	(Germany) Benedikt Dorsch	6–1, 4–6, 7–6^{(7–3)}
Win	10-6	May 2010	Ostrava, Czech Republic	Challenger	Clay	(Croatia) Ivan Dodig	7–5, 4–6, 7–6^{(7–4)}
Loss	10-7	Jan 2011	Singapore, Singapore	Challenger	Hard	(Russia) Dmitry Tursunov	4-6, 2–6
Win	11-7	May 2011	Prague, Czech Republic	Challenger	Clay	(United States) Alex Bogomolov Jr.	7–6^{(7–1)}, 5–2 ret.
Win	12-7	Jul 2011	Braunschweig, Germany	Challenger	Clay	(Russia) Evgeny Donskoy	7–5, 7–6^{(7–2)}
Win	13-7	Nov 2012	Bratislava, Slovakia	Challenger	Hard (i)	(Germany) Björn Phau	6–7^{(3–7)}, 7–6^{(7–5)}, 7–6^{(8–6)}
Loss	13-8	Nov 2013	Bratislava, Slovakia	Challenger	Hard (i)	(Slovakia) Lukáš Lacko	4–6, 6–3, 4–6
Win	14-8	Mar 2014	Irving, United States	Challenger	Hard	(United States) Steve Johnson	6–0, 6–3
Win	15-8	Jun 2014	Prague, Czech Republic	Challenger	Clay	(Czech Republic) Jiří Veselý	3–6, 6–4, 6–4
Win	16-8	Jul 2018	Czech Republic F4, Pardubice	Futures	Clay	(Germany) Peter Torebko	6–4, 6–0
Win	17-8	Jul 2018	Prague, Czech Republic	Challenger	Clay	(Kazakhstan) Aleksandr Nedovyesov	4–6, 6–3, 6–4
Loss	17-9	Nov 2018	Bratislava, Slovakia	Challenger	Hard (i)	(Kazakhstan) Alexander Bublik	4-6, 4–6
Loss	17-10	Feb 2021	Cherbourg, France	Challenger	Hard (i)	(Belgium) Ruben Bemelmans	4-6, 4–6
Loss	17-11	Feb 2022	M25, Sharm El Sheikh, Egypt	World Tennis Tour	Hard	(Lebanon) Hady Habib	4-6, 4–6
Win	18-11	Aug 2022	M25, Muttenz, Switzerland	World Tennis Tour	Clay	(France) Maxime Mora	6–3, 6–4
Loss	18-12	Sep 2022	Istanbul, Turkey	Challenger	Hard	(Moldova) Radu Albot	2–6, 0–6

=== Doubles: 50 (25–25) ===
Legend
Challengers (11–18)
Futures (14–6)

Outcome	No.	Date	Tournament	Surface	Partner	Opponents	Score
Runner-up	1.	24 January 2005	Anif, Austria	Carpet (i)	(Austria) Martin Fafl	(Austria) Markus Krenn (Austria) Wolfgang Schranz	6–4, 6–2
Winner	1.	1 August 2005	Novi Sad, Serbia and Montenegro	Clay	(Slovakia) Peter Miklusicak	(Serbia and Montenegro) Aleksander Slović (Serbia and Montenegro) Viktor Troicki	6–4, 6–4
Runner-up	2.	15 August 2005	Žilina, Slovakia	Clay	(Czech Republic) Daniel Lustig	(Czech Republic) Jaroslav Pospíšil (Slovakia) Adrian Sikora	6–2, 3–6, 6–0
Winner	2.	22 August 2005	Kaposvár, Hungary	Clay	(Italy) Alessandro da Col	(Spain) José-Carlos García-Sánchez (Spain) Miguel Pérez Puigdomenech	7–5, 4–6, 6–4
Runner-up	3.	29 August 2005	Szolnok, Hungary	Clay	(Italy) Alessandro da Col	(Hungary) Kornél Bardóczky (Hungary) Gergely Kisgyörgy	6–2, 6–1
Winner	3.	6 March 2006	Zabrze, Poland	Hard	(Ukraine) Michail Filima	(Poland) Mateusz Kowalczyk (Poland) Dawid Piatkowski	6–1, 3–6, 6–3
Winner	4.	15 May 2006	Most, Czech Republic	Clay	(Czech Republic) Roman Vögeli	(Germany) Daniel Brands (Sweden) Johan Brunström	6–2, 5–7, 7–6^{(7–5)}
Runner-up	4.	26 June 2006	Szolnok, Hungary	Clay	(Germany) David Klier	(Czech Republic) Jakub Hašek (Czech Republic) David Novak	7–6^{(7–4)}, 2–6, 6–3
Winner	5.	17 July 2006	Waterloo, Belgium	Clay	(United States) Nikita Kryvonos	(France) Jordane Doble (France) Julien Jeanpierre	6–2, 6–3
Winner	6.	24 July 2006	Sint-Katelijne-Waver, Belgium	Clay	(United States) Nikita Kryvonos	(Netherlands) Stephan Fransen (Netherlands) Romano Frantzen	6–2, 6–7^{(5–7)}, 7–5
Winner	7.	23 October 2006	Rodez, France	Hard (i)	(Uzbekistan) Denis Istomin	(Belgium) Stefan Wauters (Belgium) Réginald Willems	4–6, 7–6^{(7–4)}, 7–6^{(7–4)}
Winner	8.	27 November 2006	Vendryně, Czech Republic	Hard (i)	(Slovakia) Igor Zelenay	(Czech Republic) Daniel Lustig (Slovakia) Filip Polášek	6–1, 6–1
Winner	9.	4 December 2006	Opava, Czech Republic	Carpet (i)	(Slovakia) Igor Zelenay	(Czech Republic) Roman Vögeli (Czech Republic) Jaroslav Pospíšil	4–6, 6–2, 6–1
Winner	10.	5 February 2007	Wrocław, Poland	Hard (i)	(Czech Republic) Jan Vacek	(Slovakia) Michal Mertiňák (Switzerland) Jean-Claude Scherrer	7–5, 7–6^{(7–4)}
Winner	11.	4 December 2006	Zagreb, Croatia	Hard (i)	(Croatia) Ivan Dodig	(Croatia) Petar Jelenić (Algeria) Slimane Saoudi	6–7^{(1–7)}, 6–4, 6–4
Runner-up	5.	12 March 2007	Sarajevo, Bosnia and Herzegovina	Hard (i)	(Czech Republic) Jan Mertl	(Latvia) Ernests Gulbis (Latvia) Deniss Pavlovs	6–4, 6–3
Winner	12.	30 April 2007	Ostrava, Czech Republic	Clay	(Germany) Bastian Knittel	(Russia) Alexandre Krasnoroutskiy (Russia) Alexander Kudryavtsev	2–6, 7–5, [11–9]
Winner	13.	14 May 2007	Namangan, Uzbekistan	Hard	(Austria) Martin Slanar	(Chinese Taipei) Chen Ti (Chinese Taipei) Wang Yeu-tzuoo	6–2, 3–6, 6–1
Runner-up	6.	21 May 2007	Fergana, Uzbekistan	Hard (i)	(Austria) Martin Slanar	(Germany) Daniel Brands (United States) John Paul Fruttero	7–6^{(7–1)}, 7–5
Winner	14.	11 June 2007	Košice, Slovakia	Clay	(Slovakia) Filip Polášek	(Italy) Leonardo Azzaro (Italy) Flavio Cipolla	6–1, 7–6^{(7–5)}
Runner-up	7.	8 October 2007	Saint-Dizier, France	Hard (i)	(Romania) Florin Mergea	(Austria) Martin Slanar (Czech Republic) Pavel Šnobel	6–2, 6–3
Winner	15.	15 October 2007	La Roche-sur-Yon, France	Hard (i)	(Australia) Raphael Durek	(Serbia) Vladimir Obradović (Netherlands) Igor Sijsling	6–3, 6–1
Winner	16.	3 December 2007	Frýdlant nad Ostravicí, Czech Republic	Carpet (i)	(Slovakia) Igor Zelenay	(Czech Republic) Jiří Krkoška (Slovakia) Ján Stančík	6–4, 6–2
Runner-up	8.	10 December 2007	Opava, Czech Republic	Carpet (i)	(Slovakia) Igor Zelenay	(Croatia) Nikola Martinović (Croatia) Joško Topić	6–4, 7–5
Winner	17.	28 January 2008	Wrocław, Poland	Hard (i)	(United States) James Cerretani	(Austria) Werner Eschauer (Austria) Jürgen Melzer	6–7^{(7–9)}, 6–3, [10–7]
Runner-up	9.	1 September 2008	Düsseldorf, Germany	Clay	(Slovakia) Igor Zelenay	(Czech Republic) Jan Hájek (Czech Republic) Tomáš Zíb	1–6, 6–2, [10–7]
Winner	18.	5 January 2009	Schwieberdingen, Germany	Carpet (i)	(Latvia) Andis Juška	(Germany) David Klier (Germany) Philipp Marx	6–1, 6–4
Runner-up	10.	30 March 2009	Naples, Italy	Clay	(Germany) Frank Moser	(Uruguay) Pablo Cuevas (Spain) David Marrero	6–4, 6–3
Runner-up	11.	21 September 2009	Trnava, Slovakia	Clay	(Czech Republic) Jan Minář	(Bulgaria) Grigor Dimitrov (Russia) Teymuraz Gabashvili	6–4, 2–6, [10–8]
Runner-up	12.	28 September 2009	Naples, Italy	Clay	(Brazil) Thiago Alves	(Croatia) Ivan Dodig (Portugal) Frederico Gil	6–1, 6–3
Runner-up	13.	8 March 2010	Sarajevo, Bosnia and Herzegovina	Hard (i)	(Croatia) Ivan Dodig	(France) Nicolas Mahut (France) Édouard Roger-Vasselin	7–6^{(8–6)}, 6–7^{(7–9)}, [10–5]
Winner	19.	5 July 2010	Oberstaufen, Germany	Clay	(Germany) Frank Moser	(Chile) Hans Podlipnik Castillo (Austria) Max Raditschnigg	6–0, 7–5
Winner	20.	26 September 2010	Trnava, Slovakia	Clay	(Slovakia) Karol Beck	(Austria) Alexander Peya (Austria) Martin Slanar	4–6, 7–6^{(7–3)}, [10–8]
Runner-up	14.	19 November 2011	Bratislava, Slovakia	Hard	(Czech Republic) David Škoch	(Czech Republic) Jan Hájek (Slovakia) Lukáš Lacko	7–5, 7–5
Winner	21.	7 May 2012	Prague, Czech Republic	Clay	(Argentina) Horacio Zeballos	(Slovakia) Martin Kližan (Slovakia) Igor Zelenay	7–5, 2–6, [12–10]
Runner-up	15.	3 June 2013	Prostějov, Czech Republic	Clay	(Poland) Mateusz Kowalczyk	(United States) Nicholas Monroe (Germany) Simon Stadler	6–4, 6–4
Winner	22.	3 June 2014	Prostějov, Czech Republic	Clay	(Germany) Andre Begemann	(Canada) Peter Polansky (Canada) Adil Shamasdin	6–1, 6–2
Runner-up	16.	22 January 2017	Koblenz, Germany	Hard (i)	(Czech Republic) Roman Jebavý	(Chile) Hans Podlipnik Castillo (Belarus) Andrei Vasilevski	7–5, 3–6, [16–14]
Runner-up	17.	6 May 2017	Ostrava, Czech Republic	Clay	(Australia) Rameez Junaid	(India) Jeevan Nedunchezhiyan (Croatia) Franko Škugor	6–3, 6–2
Runner-up	18.	11 August 2017	Portorož, Slovenia	Hard	(Croatia) Franko Škugor	(Chile) Hans Podlipnik Castillo (Belarus) Andrei Vasilevski	6–3, 7–6^{(7–4)}
Runner-up	19.	5 May 2018	Ostrava, Czech Republic	Clay	(Ukraine) Sergiy Stakhovsky	(Hungary) Attila Balázs (Portugal) Gonçalo Oliveira	6–0, 7–5
Winner	23.	10 August 2018	Portorož, Slovenia	Hard	(Spain) Gerard Granollers	(Serbia) Nikola Ćaćić (Austria) Lucas Miedler	7–5, 6–3
Winner	24.	5 October 2018	Almaty, Kazakhstan	Hard	(Czech Republic) Zdeněk Kolář	(Russia) Evgeny Karlovskiy (Kazakhstan) Timur Khabibulin	6–3, 6–1
Runner-up	20.	14 September 2019	Istanbul, Turkey	Hard	(Czech Republic) Marek Gengel	(Kazakhstan) Andrey Golubev (Kazakhstan) Aleksandr Nedovyesov	Walkover
Runner-up	21.	22 August 2020	Prague, Czech Republic	Clay	(Czech Republic) Zdeněk Kolář	(France) Pierre-Hugues Herbert (France) Arthur Rinderknech	3-6, 4–6
Winner	25.	11 September 2020	Prostějov, Czech Republic	Clay	(Czech Republic) Zdeněk Kolář	(India) Sriram Balaji (India) Divij Sharan	6–2, 2–6, [10–6]
Runner-up	22.	25 September 2021	Bucharest, Romania	Clay	(Germany) Maximilian Marterer	(Philippines) Ruben Gonzales (United States) Hunter Johnson	6–1, 2–6, [3–10]
Runner-up	23.	4 December 2021	Forli, Italy	Hard (i)	(Ukraine) Vitaliy Sachko	(Croatia) Antonio Šančić (Austria) Tristan-Samuel Weissborn	6–7^{(4–7)}, 6–4, [7–10]
Runner-up	24.	30 July 2022	San Benedetto del Tronto, Italy	Clay	(Hungary) Fábián Marozsán	(Ukraine) Vladyslav Manafov (Ukraine) Oleg Prihodko	6–4, 3–6, [10–12]
Runner-up	25.	3 September 2022	Mallorca, Spain	Hard	(Czech Republic) Marek Gengel	(India) Yuki Bhambri (India) Saketh Myneni	2–6, 2–6
