= Koray Kırcı =

Turkish tennis player (born 1998)

- Country (sports): Turkey
- Born: 17 August 1998 (age 28) Bursa, Turkey
- Height: 1.85 m (6 ft 1 in)
- Plays: Right-handed (two-handed backhand)
- Coach: Günaydin Kirci
- Prize money: US $65,988

Singles
- Career record: 0–0 (at ATP Tour level, Grand Slam level, and in Davis Cup)
- Career titles: 0
- Highest ranking: No. 616 (31 October 2022)
- Current ranking: No. 1,470 (19 October 2026

Doubles
- Career record: 0–1 (at ATP Tour level, Grand Slam level, and in Davis Cup)
- Career titles: 0
- Highest ranking: No. 748 (2 May 2022)
- Current ranking: No. 2,786 (19 October 2026)
- Last updated on: 19 October 2026.

Koray Kırcı (born 17 August 1998) is a Turkish tennis player. He has a career high ATP singles ranking of No. 616 achieved on 31 October 2022 and a career high ATP doubles ranking of No. 748 achieved on 2 May 2022.

Kırcı made his ATP main draw debut at the 2018 Antalya Open in the doubles draw partnering Ergi Kırkın.
