= 2020 Sánchez-Casal Cup – Singles =

Tennis tournament

Singles
- 2020 Sánchez-Casal Cup

Final
- Champion: (Spain) Carlos Alcaraz
- Runner-up: (Bosnia and Herzegovina) Damir Džumhur
- Score: 4–6, 6–2, 6–1

Events
Singles	Doubles
← 2019 ·	Sánchez-Casal Cup	· 2021 →

Salvatore Caruso was the defending champion and chose not to defend his title.

Carlos Alcaraz won the title after defeating Damir Džumhur 4–6, 6–2, 6–1 in the final.

== Seeds ==
1. (Spain) Jaume Munar (quarterfinals)
2. (Australia) Christopher O'Connell (second round, retired)
3. (Portugal) Pedro Sousa (first round)
4. (Bosnia and Herzegovina) Damir Džumhur (final)
5. (Argentina) Facundo Bagnis (quarterfinals)
6. (United States) Bradley Klahn (withdrew)
7. (Spain) Bernabé Zapata Miralles (first round)
8. (Spain) Carlos Taberner (first round)

== Draw ==
=== Key ===
- Q = Qualifier
- WC = Wild card
- LL = Lucky loser
- Alt = Alternate
- SE = Special exempt
- PR = Protected ranking
- ITF = ITF entry
- JE = Junior exempt
- w/o = Walkover
- r = Retired
- d = Defaulted
- SR = Special ranking

=== Finals ===
Semifinals
Q	(Argentina) Andrea Collarini	3	5
(Spain) Carlos Alcaraz	6	7
4	(Bosnia and Herzegovina) Damir Džumhur	6	6
WC	(Spain) Carlos Gimeno Valero	0	3

Final
(Spain) Carlos Alcaraz	4	6	6
4	(Bosnia and Herzegovina) Damir Džumhur	6	2	1

=== Top half ===
First round
1	(Spain) J Munar	7	6
(Netherlands) B van de Zandschulp	5	1
Q	(Chile) MT Barrios Vera	7^{7}	6
(United States) E Escobedo	6^{2}	3
Q	(Argentina) A Collarini	7^{7}	7
(Ecuador) E Gómez	6^{5}	5
Q	(United States) B Nakashima	6	6
LL	(Argentina) R Olivo	2	3
3	(Portugal) P Sousa	3	3
(Spain) C Alcaraz	6	6
(Australia) A Vukic	6	3	6^{5}
(Spain) M Vilella Martínez	2	6	7^{7}
SE	(Argentina) F Cerúndolo	1	4
(Italy) L Giustino	6	6
(Slovakia) F Horanský	7	2	6
7	(Spain) B Zapata Miralles	5	6	2

Second round
1	(Spain) J Munar	3	7	6
Q	(Chile) MT Barrios Vera	6	5	1
Q	(Argentina) A Collarini	7	7
Q	(United States) B Nakashima	5	5
(Spain) C Alcaraz	6	4	6
(Spain) M Vilella Martínez	3	6	2
(Italy) L Giustino	3	6	2
(Slovakia) F Horanský	6	3	6

Quarterfinals
1	(Spain) J Munar	5	4
Q	(Argentina) A Collarini	7	6
(Spain) C Alcaraz	7	4	6
(Slovakia) F Horanský	5	6	4

Semifinals
Q	(Argentina) A Collarini	3	5
(Spain) C Alcaraz	6	7

=== Bottom half ===
First round
8	(Spain) C Taberner	7^{7}	2	1
LL	(France) M Janvier	6^{5}	6	6
LL	(Canada) P Polansky	2	4
(Italy) A Giannessi	6	6
(Belgium) K Coppejans	6	7
WC	(India) R Ramanathan	2	5
PR	(Germany) M Marterer	2	0
4	(Bosnia and Herzegovina) D Džumhur	6	6
5	(Argentina) F Bagnis	7^{7}	6
(Portugal) J Domingues	6^{5}	4
(Kazakhstan) D Popko	7	6
WC	(Spain) N Kuhn	5	4
WC	(Spain) C Gimeno Valero	6	6
Q	(France) E Couacaud	3	2
(Australia) A Bolt	1	2
2	(Australia) C O'Connell	6	6

Second round
LL	(France) M Janvier	6	3	6
(Italy) A Giannessi	4	6	2
(Belgium) K Coppejans	2	3
4	(Bosnia and Herzegovina) D Džumhur	6	6
5	(Argentina) F Bagnis	7	6
(Kazakhstan) D Popko	5	2
WC	(Spain) C Gimeno Valero	6^{5}	2
2	(Australia) C O'Connell	7^{7}	5^{r}

Quarterfinals
LL	(France) M Janvier	6	1	3
4	(Bosnia and Herzegovina) D Džumhur	3	6	6
5	(Argentina) F Bagnis	0	2
WC	(Spain) C Gimeno Valero	6	6

Semifinals
4	(Bosnia and Herzegovina) D Džumhur	6	6
WC	(Spain) C Gimeno Valero	0	3
