= 2021 Sánchez-Casal Cup – Doubles =

Doubles
- 2021 Sánchez-Casal Cup

Final
- Champions: (Finland) Harri Heliövaara (Czech Republic) Roman Jebavý
- Runners-up: (Portugal) Nuno Borges (Portugal) Francisco Cabral
- Score: 6–4, 6–3

Events
Singles	Doubles
← 2020 ·	Sánchez-Casal Cup	· 2024 →

Szymon Walków and Tristan-Samuel Weissborn were the defending champions but chose not to defend their title.

Harri Heliövaara and Roman Jebavý won the title after defeating Nuno Borges and Francisco Cabral 6–4, 6–3 in the final.

== Seeds ==
1. (Finland) Harri Heliövaara / (Czech Republic) Roman Jebavý (champions)
2. (Ukraine) Denys Molchanov / (Spain) David Vega Hernández (quarterfinals)
3. (Austria) Alexander Erler / (Austria) Lucas Miedler (semifinals)
4. (India) Jeevan Nedunchezhiyan / (India) Purav Raja (first round)

== Draw ==
=== Key ===
- Q = Qualifier
- WC = Wild card
- LL = Lucky loser
- Alt = Alternate
- SE = Special exempt
- PR = Protected ranking
- ITF = ITF entry
- JE = Junior exempt
- w/o = Walkover
- r = Retired
- d = Defaulted
- SR = Special ranking

First round
1	(Finland) H Heliövaara (Czech Republic) R Jebavý	7^{7}	6
(Spain) Á López San Martín (Spain) N Sánchez Izqueirdo	6^{5}	3
(Argentina) A Collarini (Netherlands) M Vervoort	3	4
(Ukraine) V Manafov (Poland) P Matuszewski	6	6
4	(India) J Nedunchezhiyan (India) P Raja	7^{7}	2	[8]
(Slovakia) F Horanský (Slovakia) A Molčan	6^{2}	6	[10]
(Russia) T Gabashvili (Bulgaria) D Kuzmanov	6	6
WC	(Spain) A Moro Cañas (Spain) Jaume Pla Malfeito	3	2
(Philippines) R Gonzales (India) A Kadhe	6	6
WC	(Russia) Bekkhan Atlangeriev (Netherlands) Marcel Marlon Sudzum	1	1
(Spain) J Barranco Cosano (Kazakhstan) D Popko	4	4
3	(Austria) A Erler (Austria) L Miedler	6	6
WC	(Spain) Àlex Martí Pujolràs (Spain) T Robredo	3	3
(Portugal) N Borges (Portugal) F Cabral	6	6
(Italy) M Bortolotti (Spain) S Martos Gornés	6	3	[6]
2	(Ukraine) D Molchanov (Spain) D Vega Hernández	4	6	[10]

Quarterfinals
1	(Finland) H Heliövaara (Czech Republic) R Jebavý	1	6	[10]
(Ukraine) V Manafov (Poland) P Matuszewski	6	3	[6]
(Slovakia) F Horanský (Slovakia) A Molčan
(Russia) T Gabashvili (Bulgaria) D Kuzmanov	w/o
(Philippines) R Gonzales (India) A Kadhe	3	6^{3}
3	(Austria) A Erler (Austria) L Miedler	6	7^{7}
(Portugal) N Borges (Portugal) F Cabral	6	6
2	(Ukraine) D Molchanov (Spain) D Vega Hernández	4	3

Semifinals
1	(Finland) H Heliövaara (Czech Republic) R Jebavý	6	6^{4}	[10]
(Russia) T Gabashvili (Bulgaria) D Kuzmanov	4	7^{7}	[8]
3	(Austria) A Erler (Austria) L Miedler	6^{2}	4
(Portugal) N Borges (Portugal) F Cabral	7^{7}	6

Final
1	(Finland) H Heliövaara (Czech Republic) R Jebavý	6	6
(Portugal) N Borges (Portugal) F Cabral	4	3
