= 2018 Sánchez-Casal Mapfre Cup – Singles =

Singles
- 2018 Sánchez-Casal Mapfre Cup

Final
- Champion: (Spain) Roberto Carballés Baena
- Runner-up: (Spain) Pedro Martínez
- Score: 1–6, 6–3, 6–0

Events
Singles	Doubles
Sánchez-Casal Mapfre Cup	· 2019 →

This was the first edition of the tournament.

Roberto Carballés Baena won the title after defeating Pedro Martínez 1–6, 6–3, 6–0 in the final.

== Seeds ==
1. (Spain) Roberto Carballés Baena (champion)
2. (Spain) Pablo Andújar (first round, retired)
3. (Argentina) Marco Trungelliti (semifinals)
4. (Italy) Stefano Travaglia (first round)
5. (Portugal) Pedro Sousa (quarterfinals)
6. (Italy) Gianluigi Quinzi (first round)
7. (Spain) Sergio Gutiérrez Ferrol (second round)
8. (Slovakia) Andrej Martin (first round)

== Draw ==
=== Key ===
- Q = Qualifier
- WC = Wild card
- LL = Lucky loser
- Alt = Alternate
- SE = Special exempt
- PR = Protected ranking
- ITF = ITF entry
- JE = Junior exempt
- w/o = Walkover
- r = Retired
- d = Defaulted
- SR = Special ranking

=== Finals ===
Semifinals
1	(Spain) Roberto Carballés Baena	6	1	7
3	(Argentina) Marco Trungelliti	4	6	5
(Italy) Filippo Baldi	4	2
(Spain) Pedro Martínez	6	6

Final
1	(Spain) Roberto Carballés Baena	1	6	6
(Spain) Pedro Martínez	6	3	0

=== Top half ===
First round
1	(Spain) R Carballés Baena	6	6
Q	(Italy) R Marcora	2	1
(France) J Tatlot	6	6
WC	(Russia) Bekkhan Atlangeriev	1	3
WC	(Spain) Miguel Semmler	4	3
(Italy) A Giannessi	6	6
(France) K de Schepper	7^{8}	6
8	(Slovakia) A Martin	6^{6}	2
3	(Argentina) M Trungelliti	7	6
(Portugal) J Domingues	5	2
(Belgium) A De Greef	3	6	6^{3}
Q	(France) TK Wang	6	3	7^{7}
(Spain) T Robredo	6	6
(Spain) B Zapata Miralles	4	2
(Spain) R Ojeda Lara	1	1
5	(Portugal) P Sousa	6	6

Second round
1	(Spain) R Carballés Baena	6	6
(France) J Tatlot	2	4
(Italy) A Giannessi	6	6
(France) K de Schepper	3	2
3	(Argentina) M Trungelliti	5	7	6
Q	(France) TK Wang	7	5	1
(Spain) T Robredo	5	5
5	(Portugal) P Sousa	7	7

Quarterfinals
1	(Spain) R Carballés Baena	6	6
(Italy) A Giannessi	2	2
3	(Argentina) M Trungelliti	4	6	6
5	(Portugal) P Sousa	6	4	2

Semifinals
1	(Spain) R Carballés Baena	6	1	7
3	(Argentina) M Trungelliti	4	6	5

=== Bottom half ===
First round
7	(Spain) S Gutiérrez Ferrol	6	6
(Lithuania) L Grigelis	4	2
(Italy) F Baldi	6	6
WC	(Spain) A López San Martín	2	0
(France) D Guez	6^{5}	3
(Italy) M Viola	7^{7}	6
Q	(Serbia) M Zekić	6	6
4	(Italy) S Travaglia	3	2
6	(Italy) G Quinzi	4	5
(Spain) P Martínez	6	7
(Spain) D Gimeno Traver	6	2	2
(Bulgaria) D Kuzmanov	2	6	6
Q	(Spain) J Samper Montaña	4	4
(Italy) L Giustino	6	6
WC	(Spain) N Kuhn	6	0
2	(Spain) P Andújar	2	0^{r}

Second round
7	(Spain) S Gutiérrez Ferrol	1	6	2
(Italy) F Baldi	6	4	6
(Italy) M Viola	4	5
Q	(Serbia) M Zekić	6	7
(Spain) P Martínez	6	6
(Bulgaria) D Kuzmanov	2	4
(Italy) L Giustino	6	4	6
WC	(Spain) N Kuhn	4	6	1

Quarterfinals
(Italy) F Baldi	6	6
Q	(Serbia) M Zekić	3	3
(Spain) P Martínez	6	7
(Italy) L Giustino	2	5

Semifinals
(Italy) F Baldi	4	2
(Spain) P Martínez	6	6
