= 2019 Sánchez-Casal Cup – Doubles =

Doubles
- 2019 Sánchez-Casal Cup

Final
- Champions: (Italy) Simone Bolelli (Spain) David Vega Hernández
- Runners-up: (Spain) Sergio Martos Gornés (India) Ramkumar Ramanathan
- Score: 6–4, 7–5

Events
Singles	Doubles
← 2018 ·	Sánchez-Casal Cup	· 2020 →

Marcelo Demoliner and David Vega Hernández were the defending champions but only Vega Hernández chose to defend his title, partnering Simone Bolelli. Vega Hernández successfully defended his title.

Bolelli and Vega Hernández won the title after defeating Sergio Martos Gornés and Ramkumar Ramanathan 6–4, 7–5 in the final.

== Seeds ==
1. (Czech Republic) Roman Jebavý / (United States) Nicholas Monroe (semifinals)
2. (Uruguay) Ariel Behar / (Austria) Tristan-Samuel Weissborn (quarterfinals)
3. (Bosnia and Herzegovina) Tomislav Brkić / (Croatia) Ante Pavić (first round)
4. (Italy) Simone Bolelli / (Spain) David Vega Hernández (champions)

== Draw ==
=== Key ===
- Q = Qualifier
- WC = Wild card
- LL = Lucky loser
- Alt = Alternate
- SE = Special exempt
- PR = Protected ranking
- ITF = ITF entry
- JE = Junior exempt
- w/o = Walkover
- r = Retired
- d = Defaulted
- SR = Special ranking

First round
1	(Czech Republic) R Jebavý (United States) N Monroe	6	6
WC	(United Kingdom) Max Andrews (France) Jules Okala	2	1
(Slovakia) F Horanský (Netherlands) M Vervoort	2	6^{5}
(Spain) G Granollers (Spain) P Martínez	6	7^{7}
3	(Bosnia and Herzegovina) T Brkić (Croatia) A Pavić	6	3	[7]
(Spain) S Martos Gornés (India) R Ramanathan	3	6	[10]
(Spain) A Davidovich Fokina (Spain) E López Pérez
PR	(Spain) Í Cervantes (Spain) O Roca Batalla	w/o
WC	(Russia) Bekkhan Atlangeriev (United States) Jordan Chiu	2	2
Alt	(Switzerland) S Ehrat (Sweden) M Eriksson	6	6
(Croatia) T Draganja (Egypt) M Safwat	6^{5}	3
4	(Italy) S Bolelli (Spain) D Vega Hernández	7^{7}	6
WC	(Spain) A Moro Cañas (Spain) Jaume Pla Malfeito	0	3
(Serbia) N Čačić (Chile) H Podlipnik Castillo	6	6
(Switzerland) L Margaroli (Canada) A Shamasdin	4	2
2	(Uruguay) A Behar (Austria) T-S Weissborn	6	6

Quarterfinals
1	(Czech Republic) R Jebavý (United States) N Monroe	6	2	[16]
(Spain) G Granollers (Spain) P Martínez	4	6	[14]
(Spain) S Martos Gornés (India) R Ramanathan	5	6	[12]
PR	(Spain) Í Cervantes (Spain) O Roca Batalla	7	3	[10]
Alt	(Switzerland) S Ehrat (Sweden) M Eriksson	4	2
4	(Italy) S Bolelli (Spain) D Vega Hernández	6	6
(Serbia) N Čačić (Chile) H Podlipnik Castillo	6	7
2	(Uruguay) A Behar (Austria) T-S Weissborn	3	5

Semifinals
1	(Czech Republic) R Jebavý (United States) N Monroe	4	6^{6}
(Spain) S Martos Gornés (India) R Ramanathan	6	7^{8}
4	(Italy) S Bolelli (Spain) D Vega Hernández	6	6
(Serbia) N Čačić (Chile) H Podlipnik Castillo	3	3

Final
(Spain) S Martos Gornés (India) R Ramanathan	4	5
4	(Italy) S Bolelli (Spain) D Vega Hernández	6	7
