= 2024 Sánchez-Casal Cup – Singles =

Singles
- 2024 Sánchez-Casal Cup

Final
- Champion: (Dominican Republic) Nick Hardt
- Runner-up: (Spain) Bernabé Zapata Miralles
- Score: 6–4, 3–6, 6–2

Events
| Singles | Doubles |
- Sánchez-Casal Cup

Dimitar Kuzmanov was the defending champion of the 2024 Sánchez-Casal Cup – Singles, having secured his maiden ATP Challenger title at the Emilio Sánchez Academy in 2021. However, he opted not to participate in the 2024 edition, thereby not defending his title. In his absence, Nick Hardt won the title after defeating Bernabé Zapata Miralles 6–4, 3–6, 6–2 in the final.

== Seeds ==
1. (France) Quentin Halys (first round)
2. (Spain) Bernabé Zapata Miralles (final)
3. (Netherlands) Jesper de Jong (quarterfinals)
4. (Moldova) Radu Albot (second round)
5. (Ukraine) Vitaliy Sachko (second round)
6. Ivan Gakhov (second round)
7. (United Kingdom) Billy Harris (quarterfinals)
8. (Belgium) Joris De Loore (first round, retired)

== Draw ==
Key

- Q = Qualifier
- WC = Wild card
- LL = Lucky loser
- Alt = Alternate
- ITF = ITF entry
- PR = Protected ranking
- SR = Special ranking
- SE = Special exempt
- JE = Junior exempt
- JR = Junior Accelerator Programme entrant
- CO = College Accelerator Programme entrant
- NG = Next Gen Accelerator Program entrant
- w/o = Walkover
- r = Retired
- d = Defaulted

=== Finals ===
Semifinals
Alt | (Dominican Republic) Nick Hardt | 6 | 4 | 6
(Spain) Javier Barranco Cosano | 1 | 6 | 0
Q | (Italy) Lorenzo Giustino | 6^{1} | 0^{r}
2/WC | (Spain) Bernabé Zapata Miralles | 7^{7} | 0

Final
Alt | (Dominican Republic) Nick Hardt | 6 | 3 | 6
2/WC | (Spain) Bernabé Zapata Miralles | 4 | 6 | 2

=== Top half ===
First round
1 | (France) Q Halys | 5 | 6 | 4
Alt | (Dominican Republic) N Hardt | 7 | 1 | 6
(France) V Royer | 6 | 6
Q | (Peru) I Buse | 3 | 4
(Spain) O Roca Batalla | 5 | 6 | 3
(Belgium) M Geerts | 7 | 3 | 6
(Romania) ND Ionel | 6 | 1
8 | (Belgium) J De Loore | 4 | 0^{r}
4/SE | (Moldova) R Albot | 0 | 6 | 6
(Spain) D Rincón | 6 | 4 | 3
(Germany) H Squire | 4 | 4
Q | (Spain) C Taberner | 6 | 6
(Spain) J Barranco Cosano | 6 | 7
Alt | (France) Mathys Erhard | 4 | 5
(Spain) A Moro Cañas | 5 | 2
6 | I Gakhov | 7 | 6

Second round
Alt | (Dominican Republic) N Hardt | 6 | 6
(France) V Royer | 4 | 3
(Belgium) M Geerts | 6^{7} | 6 | 1
(Romania) ND Ionel | 7^{9} | 4 | 6
4/SE | (Moldova) R Albot | 4 | 5
Q | (Spain) C Taberner | 6 | 7
(Spain) J Barranco Cosano | 6 | 3 | 6
6 | I Gakhov | 1 | 6 | 4

Quarterfinals
Alt | (Dominican Republic) N Hardt | 6 | 6
(Romania) ND Ionel | 3 | 3
Q | (Spain) C Taberner | 5 | 0
(Spain) J Barranco Cosano | 7 | 6

Semifinals
Alt | (Dominican Republic) N Hardt | 6 | 4 | 6
(Spain) J Barranco Cosano | 1 | 6 | 0

=== Bottom half ===
First round
5 | (Ukraine) V Sachko | 6^{6} | 6 | 7
(France) T Lamasine | 7^{8} | 1 | 5
(Austria) D Novak | 3 | 0^{r}
Q | (Italy) L Giustino | 6 | 5
WC | (Spain) David Naharro | 1 | 0
(Spain) N Sánchez Izquierdo | 6 | 6
Q | (Ukraine) O Krutykh | 1 | 3
3 | (Netherlands) J de Jong | 6 | 6
7 | (United Kingdom) B Harris | 6 | 6
WC | (United States) Tristan McCormick | 1 | 1
Q | (France) G Debru | 6 | 6
(Bulgaria) I Radulov | 2 | 4
(Italy) M Cecchinato | 6 | 6
Q | (Spain) M Damas | 2 | 1
(Austria) L Neumayer | 3 | 3
2/WC | (Spain) B Zapata Miralles | 6 | 6

Second round
5 | (Ukraine) V Sachko | 4 | 2
Q | (Italy) L Giustino | 6 | 6
(Spain) N Sánchez Izquierdo | 3 | 4
3 | (Netherlands) J de Jong | 6 | 6
7 | (United Kingdom) B Harris | 6 | 0
Q | (France) G Debru | 0 | 0^{r}
(Italy) M Cecchinato | 1 | 0^{r}
2/WC | (Spain) B Zapata Miralles | 6 | 4

Quarterfinals
Q | (Italy) L Giustino | 7 | 6
3 | (Netherlands) J de Jong | 5 | 4
7 | (United Kingdom) B Harris | 5 | 6^{2}
2/WC | (Spain) B Zapata Miralles | 7 | 7^{7}

Semifinals
Q | (Italy) L Giustino | 6^{1} | 0^{r}
2/WC | (Spain) B Zapata Miralles | 7^{7} | 0
