= 2019 Sánchez-Casal Cup – Singles =

Singles
- 2019 Sánchez-Casal Cup

Final
- Champion: (Italy) Salvatore Caruso
- Runner-up: (Slovakia) Jozef Kovalík
- Score: 6–4, 6–2

Events
Singles	Doubles
← 2018 ·	Sánchez-Casal Cup	· 2020 →

Roberto Carballés Baena was the defending champion but retired in the third round against Jozef Kovalík.

Salvatore Caruso won the title after defeating Kovalík 6–4, 6–2 in the final.

== Seeds ==
All seeds receive a bye into the second round.

1. (Spain) Roberto Carballés Baena (third round, retired)
2. (Spain) Jaume Munar (semifinals)
3. (Spain) Alejandro Davidovich Fokina (second round)
4. (Italy) Salvatore Caruso (champion)
5. (Slovakia) Andrej Martin (withdrew)
6. (Italy) Paolo Lorenzi (second round)
7. (Portugal) Pedro Sousa (quarterfinals)
8. (Italy) Lorenzo Giustino (second round)
9. (Spain) Pedro Martínez (third round)
10. (Italy) Filippo Baldi (quarterfinals)
11. (Italy) Federico Gaio (third round)
12. (Canada) Steven Diez (third round)
13. (Belgium) Kimmer Coppejans (second round)
14. (Italy) Alessandro Giannessi (semifinals)
15. (India) Ramkumar Ramanathan (second round)
16. (Germany) Rudolf Molleker (third round, withdrew)

== Draw ==
=== Key ===
- Q = Qualifier
- WC = Wild card
- LL = Lucky loser
- Alt = Alternate
- SE = Special exempt
- PR = Protected ranking
- ITF = ITF entry
- JE = Junior exempt
- w/o = Walkover
- r = Retired
- d = Defaulted
- SR = Special ranking

=== Finals ===
Quarterfinals
(Slovakia) Jozef Kovalík	6	2	7^{7}
(Spain) Carlos Taberner	1	6	6^{5}
14	(Italy) Alessandro Giannessi	5	6	6
10	(Italy) Filippo Baldi	7	0	1
7	(Portugal) Pedro Sousa	1	4
4	(Italy) Salvatore Caruso	6	6
(Egypt) Mohamed Safwat	4	7^{7}	4
2	(Spain) Jaume Munar	6	6^{4}	6

Semifinals
(Slovakia) Jozef Kovalík	6	7^{7}
14	(Italy) Alessandro Giannessi	3	6^{5}
4	(Italy) Salvatore Caruso	6	7
2	(Spain) Jaume Munar	4	5

Final
(Slovakia) Jozef Kovalík	4	2
4	(Italy) Salvatore Caruso	6	6

=== Top half ===
==== Section 1 ====
First round
(Spain) J Barranco Cosano	6	6
(Spain) D Gimeno Traver	3	0
(Italy) GM Moroni	6	2	4
(Slovakia) J Kovalík	3	6	6
(Russia) P Kotov	0	7	4
(Slovenia) B Kavčič	6	5	6
Alt	(Russia) Ronald Slobodchikov	0	2
(Spain) C Taberner	6	6

Second round
1	(Spain) R Carballés Baena	6	6
(Spain) J Barranco Cosano	4	2
(Slovakia) J Kovalík	2	6	6
13	(Belgium) K Coppejans	6	3	3
11	(Italy) F Gaio	6	6
(Slovenia) B Kavčič	1	0
(Spain) C Taberner	6	6
8	(Italy) L Giustino	4	0

Third round
1	(Spain) R Carballés Baena	7	5	0^{r}
(Slovakia) J Kovalík	5	7	3
11	(Italy) F Gaio	2	6^{5}
(Spain) C Taberner	6	7^{7}

Quarterfinals
(Slovakia) J Kovalík	6	2	7^{7}
(Spain) C Taberner	1	6	6^{5}

==== Section 2 ====
First round
(Slovakia) F Horanský	7	6
(Italy) R Bonadio	5	2
LL	(Spain) G Granollers	6	3	2
(Russia) I Nedelko	3	6	6
(Switzerland) S Ehrat	6	6
(Italy) G Quinzi	4	1
(Italy) R Brancaccio	0	3^{r}
WC	(Spain) Jaume Pla Malfeito	6	4

Second round
3	(Spain) A Davidovich Fokina	2	6	6^{0}
(Slovakia) F Horanský	6	4	7^{7}
(Russia) I Nedelko	1	4
14	(Italy) A Giannessi	6	6
10	(Italy) F Baldi	6	6
(Switzerland) S Ehrat	3	3
WC	(Spain) J Pla Malfeito	6	1	6
6	(Italy) P Lorenzi	4	6	2

Third round
(Slovakia) F Horanský	6^{6}	7^{9}	4
14	(Italy) A Giannessi	7^{8}	6^{7}	6
10	(Italy) F Baldi	6	6
WC	(Spain) J Pla Malfeito	4	1

Quarterfinals
14	(Italy) A Giannessi	5	6	6
10	(Italy) F Baldi	7	0	1

=== Bottom half ===
==== Section 3 ====
First round
WC	(Spain) E López Pérez	6	6
(France) Jules Okala	3	4
WC	(Spain) O Roca Batalla	6	0
(Spain) B Zapata Miralles	4	0^{r}
(Argentina) P Cachin	7	2	2
(Spain) T Robredo	5	6	6
(Italy) A Pellegrino	1	0^{r}
(Portugal) J Domingues	6	2

Second round
7	(Portugal) P Sousa	6	6
WC	(Spain) E López Pérez	3	3
WC	(Spain) O Roca Batalla	0	6	1
12	(Canada) S Diez	6	4	6
15	(India) R Ramanathan	5	4
(Spain) T Robredo	7	6
(Portugal) J Domingues	2	4
4	(Italy) S Caruso	6	6

Third round
7	(Portugal) P Sousa	6	7
12	(Canada) S Diez	3	5
(Spain) T Robredo	6	4	1
4	(Italy) S Caruso	3	6	6

Quarterfinals
7	(Portugal) P Sousa	1	4
4	(Italy) S Caruso	6	6

==== Section 4 ====
First round
Q	(Bosnia and Herzegovina) T Brkić	0	3
(Egypt) M Safwat	6	6
WC	(Spain) Í Cervantes	6	6
Q	(United Kingdom) Max Andrews	3	0
(Sweden) M Eriksson	3	2
WC	(Spain) A Moro Cañas	6	6
(United Kingdom) J Choinski	3	6^{5}
Alt	(Spain) D Muñoz de la Nava	6	7^{7}

Second round
Alt	(Croatia) A Pavić	4	6^{3}
(Egypt) M Safwat	6	7^{7}
WC	(Spain) Í Cervantes	6	2	6^{11}
9	(Spain) P Martínez	4	6	7^{13}
16	(Germany) R Molleker	7	6
WC	(Spain) A Moro Cañas	5	1
Alt	(Spain) D Muñoz de la Nava	2	3
2	(Spain) J Munar	6	6

Third round
(Egypt) M Safwat	6	5	6
9	(Spain) P Martínez	4	7	3
16	(Germany) R Molleker
2	(Spain) J Munar	w/o

Quarterfinals
(Egypt) M Safwat	4	7^{7}	4
2	(Spain) J Munar	6	6^{4}	6
