= 2020 Sánchez-Casal Cup =

- Date: 5–11 October
- Edition: 3rd
- Surface: Clay
- Location: Barcelona, Spain

Champions

Singles
- (Spain) Carlos Alcaraz

Doubles
- (Poland) Szymon Walków / (Austria) Tristan-Samuel Weissborn
← 2019 ·	Sánchez-Casal Cup	· 2021 →

The 2020 Sánchez-Casal Cup was a professional tennis tournament played on clay courts. It was the third edition of the tournament which was part of the 2020 ATP Challenger Tour. It took place in Barcelona, Spain between 5 and 11 October 2020.

== Singles main-draw entrants ==
=== Seeds ===
Country	Player	Rank^{1}	Seed
ESP	Jaume Munar	109	1
AUS	Christopher O'Connell	112	2
POR	Pedro Sousa	113	3
BIH	Damir Džumhur	114	4
ARG	Facundo Bagnis	129	5
~~USA~~	~~Bradley Klahn~~	~~134~~	~~6~~
ESP	Bernabé Zapata Miralles	145	7
ESP	Carlos Taberner	149	8

- ^{1} Rankings are as of 28 September 2020.

=== Other entrants ===
The following players received wildcards into the singles main draw:

- (Spain) Carlos Gimeno Valero
- (Spain) Nicola Kuhn
- (India) Ramkumar Ramanathan

The following player received entry into the singles main draw using a protected ranking:

- (Germany) Maximilian Marterer

The following players received entry into the singles main draw as special exempts:

- (Argentina) Francisco Cerúndolo
- (Slovenia) ~~Blaž Kavčič~~

The following players received entry from the qualifying draw:

- (Chile) Marcelo Tomás Barrios Vera
- (Argentina) Andrea Collarini
- (France) Enzo Couacaud
- (United States) Brandon Nakashima

The following players received entry as lucky losers:

- (France) Maxime Janvier
- (Argentina) Renzo Olivo
- (Canada) Peter Polansky

== Champions ==
=== Singles ===
- (Spain) Carlos Alcaraz def. (Bosnia and Herzegovina) Damir Džumhur 4–6, 6–2, 6–1.

=== Doubles ===
- (Poland) Szymon Walków / (Austria) Tristan-Samuel Weissborn def. (Finland) Harri Heliövaara / (United States) Alex Lawson 6–1, 4–6, [10–8].
