= 2018 Sánchez-Casal Mapfre Cup – Doubles =

Doubles
- 2018 Sánchez-Casal Mapfre Cup

Final
- Champions: (Brazil) Marcelo Demoliner (Spain) David Vega Hernández
- Runners-up: (Australia) Rameez Junaid (Netherlands) David Pel
- Score: 7–6^{(7–3)}, 6–3

Events
Singles	Doubles
- Sánchez-Casal Mapfre Cup

This was the first edition of the tournament.

Marcelo Demoliner and David Vega Hernández won the title after defeating Rameez Junaid and David Pel 7–6^{(7–3)}, 6–3 in the final.

== Seeds ==
1. (Brazil) Marcelo Demoliner / (Spain) David Vega Hernández (champions)
2. (New Zealand) Marcus Daniell / (Netherlands) Mark Vervoort (quarterfinals)
3. (Australia) Rameez Junaid / (Netherlands) David Pel (final)
4. (Slovakia) Andrej Martin / (Chile) Hans Podlipnik Castillo (semifinals)

== Draw ==
Key

- Q = Qualifier
- WC = Wild card
- LL = Lucky loser
- Alt = Alternate
- ITF = ITF entry
- PR = Protected ranking
- SR = Special ranking
- SE = Special exempt
- JE = Junior exempt
- JR = Junior Accelerator Programme entrant
- CO = College Accelerator Programme entrant
- NG = Next Gen Accelerator Program entrant
- w/o = Walkover
- r = Retired
- d = Defaulted

First round
1	(Brazil) M Demoliner (Spain) D Vega Hernández	6	6
(Lithuania) L Grigelis (Italy) A Motti	4	2
WC	(Russia) Bekkhan Atlangeriev (France) Melik Feler	6^{3}	2
(Italy) L Giustino (Spain) S Martos Gornés	7^{7}	6
4	(Slovakia) A Martin (Chile) H Podlipnik Castillo	6	6
WC	(Australia) Max Flaherty (United States) Alexander Kotzen	0	1
(Bulgaria) D Kuzmanov (Serbia) M Zekić	3	6	[4]
(Italy) A Giannessi (Italy) A Pellegrino	6	1	[10]
Alt	(Romania) D Dima (Russia) A Zhurbin	6	3	[12]
(Poland) T Bednarek (Poland) K Drzewiecki	1	6	[10]
(Spain) G Granollers (Spain) J Samper Montaña	6	5	[9]
3	(Australia) R Junaid (Netherlands) D Pel	3	7	[11]
(Serbia) N Čačić (Croatia) T Draganja	4	7^{7}	[13]
(Spain) S Gutiérrez Ferrol (Spain) Jaume Pla Malfeito	6	6^{4}	[11]
WC	(Spain) P Martínez (Spain) Miguel Semmler	3	4
2	(New Zealand) M Daniell (Netherlands) M Vervoort	6	6

Quarterfinals
1	(Brazil) M Demoliner (Spain) D Vega Hernández	6	6
(Italy) L Giustino (Spain) S Martos Gornés	1	1
4	(Slovakia) A Martin (Chile) H Podlipnik Castillo	7	7
(Italy) A Giannessi (Italy) A Pellegrino	5	5
Alt	(Romania) D Dima (Russia) A Zhurbin	3	2
3	(Australia) R Junaid (Netherlands) D Pel	6	6
(Serbia) N Čačić (Croatia) T Draganja	6	6
2	(New Zealand) M Daniell (Netherlands) M Vervoort	3	3

Semifinals
1	(Brazil) M Demoliner (Spain) D Vega Hernández	6	7
4	(Slovakia) A Martin (Chile) H Podlipnik Castillo	4	5
3	(Australia) R Junaid (Netherlands) D Pel	4	6	[10]
(Serbia) N Čačić (Croatia) T Draganja	6	3	[6]

Final
1	(Brazil) M Demoliner (Spain) D Vega Hernández	7^{7}	6
3	(Australia) R Junaid (Netherlands) D Pel	6^{3}	3
