= 2020 Sánchez-Casal Cup – Doubles =

Doubles
- 2020 Sánchez-Casal Cup

Final
- Champions: (Poland) Szymon Walków (Austria) Tristan-Samuel Weissborn
- Runners-up: (Finland) Harri Heliövaara (United States) Alex Lawson
- Score: 6–1, 4–6, [10–8]

Events
| Singles | Doubles |
| ← 2019 · | Sánchez-Casal Cup | · 2021 → |

Simone Bolelli and David Vega Hernández were the defending champions but chose not to defend their title.

Szymon Walków and Tristan-Samuel Weissborn won the title after defeating Harri Heliövaara and Alex Lawson 6–1, 4–6, [10–8] in the final.

== Seeds ==
1. (Venezuela) Luis David Martínez / (Mexico) Miguel Ángel Reyes-Varela (first round)
2. (Philippines) Treat Huey / (United States) Nathaniel Lammons (first round)
3. (India) Sriram Balaji / (Switzerland) Luca Margaroli (semifinals)
4. (Poland) Szymon Walków / (Austria) Tristan-Samuel Weissborn (champions)

== Draw ==
=== Key ===
- Q = Qualifier
- WC = Wild card
- LL = Lucky loser
- Alt = Alternate
- SE = Special exempt
- PR = Protected ranking
- ITF = ITF entry
- JE = Junior exempt
- w/o = Walkover
- r = Retired
- d = Defaulted
- SR = Special ranking

First round
1 | (Venezuela) LD Martínez (Mexico) MÁ Reyes-Varela | 6^{5} | 6 | [9]
(United States) R Galloway (United States) H Reese | 7^{7} | 1 | [11]
(Finland) H Heliövaara (United States) A Lawson | 6 | 6
WC | (United Kingdom) Max Andrews (Spain) Jaume Pla Malfeito | 0 | 4
3 | (India) S Balaji (Switzerland) L Margaroli | 5 | 6 | [10]
(India) R Ramanathan (Australia) A Vukic | 7 | 4 | [5]
WC | (Spain) D Marrero (Serbia) N Zimonjić | 4 | 6 | [5]
WC | (Spain) S Martos Gornés (Spain) M Vilella Martínez | 6 | 3 | [10]
Alt | (Bosnia and Herzegovina) D Džumhur (Australia) A Harris | 1^{r}
(Brazil) R Matos (Portugal) P Sousa | 5
Alt | (Belgium) K Coppejans (France) E Couacaud | 3 | 2
4 | (Poland) S Walków (Austria) T-S Weissborn | 6 | 6
(Brazil) O Luz (Kazakhstan) D Popko | 4 | 6 | [11]
(Monaco) R Arneodo (France) A Olivetti | 6 | 2 | [9]
(Argentina) G Durán (Argentina) R Olivo | 6^{7} | 6 | [10]
2 | (Philippines) T Huey (United States) N Lammons | 7^{9} | 4 | [7]

Quarterfinals
(United States) R Galloway (United States) H Reese | 6 | 4 | [2]
(Finland) H Heliövaara (United States) A Lawson | 1 | 6 | [10]
3 | (India) S Balaji (Switzerland) L Margaroli | 6 | 6
WC | (Spain) S Martos Gornés (Spain) M Vilella Martínez | 3 | 4
(Brazil) R Matos (Portugal) P Sousa
4 | (Poland) S Walków (Austria) T-S Weissborn | w/o
(Brazil) O Luz (Kazakhstan) D Popko | 1 | 3
(Argentina) G Durán (Argentina) R Olivo | 6 | 6

Semifinals
(Finland) H Heliövaara (United States) A Lawson | 7 | 6^{8} | [10]
3 | (India) S Balaji (Switzerland) L Margaroli | 5 | 7^{10} | [7]
4 | (Poland) S Walków (Austria) T-S Weissborn | 6^{5} | 6 | [10]
(Argentina) G Durán (Argentina) R Olivo | 7^{7} | 3 | [5]

Final
(Finland) H Heliövaara (United States) A Lawson | 1 | 6 | [8]
4 | (Poland) S Walków (Austria) T-S Weissborn | 6 | 4 | [10]
