= 2019 Sánchez-Casal Cup =

- Date: 30 September – 6 October
- Edition: 2nd
- Surface: Clay
- Location: Barcelona, Spain

Champions

Singles
- (Italy) Salvatore Caruso

Doubles
- (Italy) Simone Bolelli / (Spain) David Vega Hernández
← 2018 ·	Sánchez-Casal Cup	· 2020 →

The 2019 Sánchez-Casal Cup was a professional tennis tournament played on clay courts. It was the second edition of the tournament which was part of the 2019 ATP Challenger Tour. It took place in Barcelona, Spain between 30 September and 6 October 2019.

== Singles main-draw entrants ==
=== Seeds ===
Country	Player	Rank^{1}	Seed
ESP	Roberto Carballés Baena	77	1
ESP	Jaume Munar	99	2
ESP	Alejandro Davidovich Fokina	102	3
ITA	Salvatore Caruso	112	4
~~SVK~~	~~Andrej Martin~~	~~114~~	~~5~~
ITA	Paolo Lorenzi	115	6
POR	Pedro Sousa	124	7
ITA	Lorenzo Giustino	144	8
ESP	Pedro Martínez	154	9
ITA	Filippo Baldi	155	10
ITA	Federico Gaio	156	11
CAN	Steven Diez	160	12
BEL	Kimmer Coppejans	163	13
ITA	Alessandro Giannessi	168	14
IND	Ramkumar Ramanathan	170	15
GER	Rudolf Molleker	174	16

- ^{1} Rankings are as of 23 September 2019.

=== Other entrants ===
The following players received wildcards into the singles main draw:

- (Spain) Íñigo Cervantes
- (Spain) Enrique López Pérez
- (Spain) Alejandro Moro Cañas
- (Spain) Jaume Pla Malfeito
- (Spain) Oriol Roca Batalla

The following players received entry into the singles main draw as alternates:

- (Spain) Daniel Muñoz de la Nava
- (Croatia) Ante Pavić
- (Russia) Ronald Slobodchikov

The following players received entry from the qualifying draw:

- (United Kingdom) Max Andrews
- (Bosnia and Herzegovina) Tomislav Brkić

The following player received entry as a lucky loser:

- (Spain) Gerard Granollers

== Champions ==
=== Singles ===
- (Italy) Salvatore Caruso def. (Slovakia) Jozef Kovalík 6–4, 6–2.

=== Doubles ===
- (Italy) Simone Bolelli / (Spain) David Vega Hernández def. (Spain) Sergio Martos Gornés / (India) Ramkumar Ramanathan 6–4, 7–5.
