= 2021 Sánchez-Casal Cup – Singles =

Singles
- 2021 Sánchez-Casal Cup

Final
- Champion: (Bulgaria) Dimitar Kuzmanov
- Runner-up: (France) Hugo Gaston
- Score: 6–3, 6–0

Events
| Singles | Doubles |
- Sánchez-Casal Cup

Carlos Alcaraz was the defending champion but chose not to defend his title.

Dimitar Kuzmanov won the title after defeating Hugo Gaston 6–3, 6–0 in the final.

== Seeds ==
1. (France) Hugo Gaston (final)
2. (Slovakia) Alex Molčan (semifinals)
3. (Spain) Bernabé Zapata Miralles (first round, retired)
4. (Bosnia and Herzegovina) Damir Džumhur (second round)
5. (Serbia) Nikola Milojević (second round)
6. (Australia) Marc Polmans (first round)
7. (Germany) Cedrik-Marcel Stebe (withdrew)
8. (Czech Republic) Jiří Lehečka (first round)

== Draw ==
Key

- Q = Qualifier
- WC = Wild card
- LL = Lucky loser
- Alt = Alternate
- ITF = ITF entry
- PR = Protected ranking
- SR = Special ranking
- SE = Special exempt
- JE = Junior exempt
- JR = Junior Accelerator Programme entrant
- CO = College Accelerator Programme entrant
- NG = Next Gen Accelerator Program entrant
- w/o = Walkover
- r = Retired
- d = Defaulted

=== Finals ===
Semifinals
1 | (France) Hugo Gaston | 6 | 0 | 6
(France) Alexandre Müller | 2 | 6 | 0
(Bulgaria) Dimitar Kuzmanov | 7 | 7^{7}
2 | (Slovakia) Alex Molčan | 5 | 6^{5}

Final
1 | (France) Hugo Gaston | 3 | 0
(Bulgaria) Dimitar Kuzmanov | 6 | 6

=== Top half ===
First round
1 | (France) H Gaston | 7 | 6
(Argentina) A Collarini | 5 | 2
LL | (Ukraine) O Krutykh | 6 | 6
WC | (Spain) P Llamas Ruiz | 2 | 2
(Slovakia) F Horanský | 6 | 2 | 7
(Germany) M Marterer | 4 | 6 | 5
Q | (Spain) N Álvarez Varona | 6 | 7^{7}
8 | (Czech Republic) J Lehečka | 2 | 6^{1}
3 | (Spain) B Zapata Miralles | 2 | 0^{r}
(Spain) J Barranco Cosano | 6 | 1
Alt | (Bulgaria) A Andreev | 4 | 1^{r}
(France) A Müller | 6 | 4
(Kazakhstan) D Popko | 6 | 6
(France) T Lamasine | 3 | 2
Q | (France) M Martineau | 6 | 6
6 | (Australia) M Polmans | 4 | 3

Second round
1 | (France) H Gaston | 6 | 6
LL | (Ukraine) O Krutykh | 0 | 2
(Slovakia) F Horanský | 4 | 3
Q | (Spain) N Álvarez Varona | 6 | 6
(Spain) J Barranco Cosano | 3 | 2
(France) A Müller | 6 | 6
(Kazakhstan) D Popko | 6^{2} | 2
Q | (France) M Martineau | 7^{7} | 6

Quarterfinals
1 | (France) H Gaston | 6 | 6
Q | (Spain) N Álvarez Varona | 2 | 1
(France) A Müller | 6 | 6
Q | (France) M Martineau | 3 | 2

Semifinals
1 | (France) H Gaston | 6 | 0 | 6
(France) A Müller | 2 | 6 | 0

=== Bottom half ===
First round
LL | (Spain) A López San Martín | 1 | 0
(Portugal) N Borges | 6 | 6
WC | (Spain) N Sánchez Izquierdo | 5 | 2
(Russia) T Gabashvili | 7 | 6
(Bulgaria) D Kuzmanov | 6 | 6
(Spain) T Robredo | 0 | 1
Q | (Ukraine) G Kravchenko | 6 | 3 | 1
4 | (Bosnia and Herzegovina) D Džumhur | 3 | 6 | 6
5 | (Serbia) N Milojević | 7 | 0 | 6
Q | (Israel) Y Oliel | 5 | 6 | 4
(Serbia) P Krstin | 4 | 4
(Spain) N Kuhn | 6 | 6
(France) M Guinard | 6 | 6^{4} | 1
(Kazakhstan) T Skatov | 3 | 7^{7} | 6
WC | (Spain) A Moro Cañas | 1 | 3
2 | (Slovakia) A Molčan | 6 | 6

Second round
(Portugal) N Borges | 6^{6} | 5
(Russia) T Gabashvili | 7^{8} | 7
(Bulgaria) D Kuzmanov | 6 | 6
4 | (Bosnia and Herzegovina) D Džumhur | 4 | 4
5 | (Serbia) N Milojević | 5 | 2
(Spain) N Kuhn | 7 | 6
(Kazakhstan) T Skatov | 1 | 6^{6}
2 | (Slovakia) A Molčan | 6 | 7^{8}

Quarterfinals
(Russia) T Gabashvili | 2 | 0
(Bulgaria) D Kuzmanov | 6 | 6
(Spain) N Kuhn | 3 | 2
2 | (Slovakia) A Molčan | 6 | 6

Semifinals
(Bulgaria) D Kuzmanov | 7 | 7^{7}
2 | (Slovakia) A Molčan | 5 | 6^{5}
