= 2021 Sánchez-Casal Cup =

- Date: 4–10 October
- Edition: 4th
- Surface: Clay
- Location: Barcelona, Spain

Champions

Singles
- (Bulgaria) Dimitar Kuzmanov

Doubles
- (Finland) Harri Heliövaara / (Czech Republic) Roman Jebavý
- Sánchez-Casal Cup

The 2021 Sánchez-Casal Cup was a professional tennis tournament played on clay courts. It was the fourth edition of the tournament which was part of the 2021 ATP Challenger Tour. It took place in Barcelona, Spain between 4 and 10 October 2021.

== Singles main-draw entrants ==
=== Seeds ===
| Country | Player | Rank^{1} | Seed |
|---|---|---|---|
| FRA | Hugo Gaston | 116 | 1 |
| SVK | Alex Molčan | 119 | 2 |
| ESP | Bernabé Zapata Miralles | 120 | 3 |
| BIH | Damir Džumhur | 136 | 4 |
| SRB | Nikola Milojević | 141 | 5 |
| AUS | Marc Polmans | 158 | 6 |
| ~~GER~~ | ~~Cedrik-Marcel Stebe~~ | ~~160~~ | ~~7~~ |
| CZE | Jiří Lehečka | 177 | 8 |

- ^{1} Rankings are as of 27 September 2021.

=== Other entrants ===
The following players received wildcards into the singles main draw:

- (Spain) Pablo Llamas Ruiz
- (Spain) Alejandro Moro Cañas
- (Spain) Nikolás Sánchez Izquierdo

The following player received entry into the singles main draw as an alternate:

- (Bulgaria) Adrian Andreev

The following players received entry from the qualifying draw:

- (Spain) Nicolás Álvarez Varona
- (Ukraine) Georgii Kravchenko
- (France) Matteo Martineau
- (Israel) Yshai Oliel

The following players received entry as lucky losers:

- (Ukraine) Oleksii Krutykh
- (Spain) Álvaro López San Martín

== Champions ==
=== Singles ===
- (Bulgaria) Dimitar Kuzmanov def. (France) Hugo Gaston 6–3, 6–0.

=== Doubles ===
- (Finland) Harri Heliövaara / (Czech Republic) Roman Jebavý def. (Portugal) Nuno Borges / (Portugal) Francisco Cabral 6–4, 6–3.
