= 2024 Sánchez-Casal Cup =

- Date: 1–7 April
- Edition: 5th
- Surface: Clay
- Location: Barcelona, Spain

Champions

Singles
- (Dominican Republic) Nick Hardt

Doubles
- (Spain) Daniel Rincón / (Spain) Oriol Roca Batalla
- Sánchez-Casal Cup

The 2024 Sánchez-Casal Cup was a professional tennis tournament played on clay courts. It was the fifth edition of the tournament which was part of the 2024 ATP Challenger Tour. It took place in Barcelona, Spain between 1 and 7 April 2024.

== Singles main-draw entrants ==
=== Seeds ===
Country	Player	Rank^{1}	Seed
FRA	Quentin Halys	113	1
ESP	Bernabé Zapata Miralles	145	2
NED	Jesper de Jong	151	3
MDA	Radu Albot	155	4
UKR	Vitaliy Sachko	175	5
	Ivan Gakhov	176	6
GBR	Billy Harris	181	7
BEL	Joris De Loore	189	8

- ^{1} Rankings are as of 18 March 2024.

=== Other entrants ===
The following players received wildcards into the singles main draw:

- (United States) Tristan McCormick
- (Spain) David Naharro
- (Spain) Bernabé Zapata Miralles

The following player received entry into the singles main draw as a special exempt:

- (Moldova) Radu Albot

The following players received entry into the singles main draw as alternates:

- (France) Mathys Erhard
- (Dominican Republic) Nick Hardt

The following players received entry from the qualifying draw:

- (Peru) Ignacio Buse
- (Spain) Miguel Damas
- (France) Gabriel Debru
- (Italy) Lorenzo Giustino
- (Ukraine) Oleksii Krutykh
- (Spain) Carlos Taberner

== Champions ==
=== Singles ===
- (Dominican Republic) Nick Hardt def. (Spain) Bernabé Zapata Miralles 6–4, 3–6, 6–2.

=== Doubles ===
- (Spain) Daniel Rincón / (Spain) Oriol Roca Batalla def. (Germany) Jakob Schnaitter / (Germany) Mark Wallner 5–7, 6–4, [11–9].
