= 2018 Sánchez-Casal Mapfre Cup =

Tennis tournament

- Date: 8–14 October
- Edition: 1st
- Surface: Clay
- Location: Barcelona, Spain

Champions

Singles
- (Spain) Roberto Carballés Baena

Doubles
- (Brazil) Marcelo Demoliner / (Spain) David Vega Hernández
Sánchez-Casal Mapfre Cup	· 2019 →

The 2018 Sánchez-Casal Mapfre Cup was a professional tennis tournament played on clay courts. It was the first edition of the tournament which was part of the 2018 ATP Challenger Tour. It took place in Barcelona, Spain between 8 and 14 October 2018.

== Singles main-draw entrants ==
=== Seeds ===
Country	Player	Rank^{1}	Seed
ESP	Roberto Carballés Baena	97	1
ESP	Pablo Andújar	117	2
ARG	Marco Trungelliti	133	3
ITA	Stefano Travaglia	143	4
POR	Pedro Sousa	145	5
ITA	Gianluigi Quinzi	154	6
ESP	Sergio Gutiérrez Ferrol	157	7
SVK	Andrej Martin	166	8

- ^{1} Rankings are as of 1 October 2018.

=== Other entrants ===
The following players received wildcards into the singles main draw:

- (Russia) Bekkhan Atlangeriev
- (Spain) Nicola Kuhn
- (Spain) Álvaro López San Martín
- (Spain) Miguel Semmler

The following players received entry from the qualifying draw:

- (Italy) Roberto Marcora
- (Spain) Jordi Samper Montaña
- (France) Tak Khunn Wang
- (Serbia) Miljan Zekić

== Champions ==
=== Singles ===
- (Spain) Roberto Carballés Baena def. (Spain) Pedro Martínez 1–6, 6–3, 6–0.

=== Doubles ===
- (Brazil) Marcelo Demoliner / (Spain) David Vega Hernández def. (Australia) Rameez Junaid / (Netherlands) David Pel 7–6^{(7–3)}, 6–3.
