= 2024 Sánchez-Casal Cup – Doubles =

Doubles
- 2024 Sánchez-Casal Cup

Final
- Champions: (Spain) Daniel Rincón (Spain) Oriol Roca Batalla
- Runners-up: (Germany) Jakob Schnaitter (Germany) Mark Wallner
- Score: 5–7, 6–4, [11–9]

Events
| Singles | Doubles |
- Sánchez-Casal Cup

Harri Heliövaara and Roman Jebavý were the defending champions but chose not to defend their title.

Daniel Rincón and Oriol Roca Batalla won the title after defeating Jakob Schnaitter and Mark Wallner 5–7, 6–4, [11–9] in the final.

== Seeds ==
1. (Pakistan) Aisam-ul-Haq Qureshi / (Spain) David Vega Hernández (semifinals)
2. (Sweden) Filip Bergevi / (Netherlands) Mick Veldheer (quarterfinals)
3. (Germany) Jakob Schnaitter / (Germany) Mark Wallner (final)
4. (Spain) Daniel Rincón / (Spain) Oriol Roca Batalla (champions)

== Draw ==
Key

- Q = Qualifier
- WC = Wild card
- LL = Lucky loser
- Alt = Alternate
- ITF = ITF entry
- PR = Protected ranking
- SR = Special ranking
- SE = Special exempt
- JE = Junior exempt
- JR = Junior Accelerator Programme entrant
- CO = College Accelerator Programme entrant
- NG = Next Gen Accelerator Program entrant
- w/o = Walkover
- r = Retired
- d = Defaulted

=== Draw ===
First round
1 | (Pakistan) A-u-H Qureshi (Spain) D Vega Hernández | 7^{7} | 6
I Gakhov (Netherlands) Ryan Nijboer | 6^{2} | 2
WC | (India) Sathi Reddy Chirala (Dominican Republic) N Hardt | 1 | 2
(Poland) K Drzewiecki (Poland) S Walków | 6 | 6
4 | (Spain) D Rincón (Spain) O Roca Batalla | 6 | 6
(United Kingdom) B Harris (Germany) H Squire | 3 | 4
(Czech Republic) F Duda (Ukraine) V Sachko | 6 | 6
(Spain) J Barranco Cosano (Spain) N Sánchez Izquierdo | 3 | 2
(Ukraine) O Krutykh (Latvia) R Strombachs | 6 | 2 | [10]
WC | (Spain) Samuel Balfour Domínguez (Japan) Haruto Ishikawa | 1 | 6 | [6]
(Peru) A Merino (Germany) C Negritu | 6 | 5 | [7]
3 | (Germany) J Schnaitter (Germany) M Wallner | 4 | 7 | [10]
(Spain) A Barroso Campos (Belgium) M Geerts | 6 | 6
(France) G Debru (United States) Tristan McCormick | 3 | 4

Quarterfinals
1 | (Pakistan) A-u-H Qureshi (Spain) D Vega Hernández | 6 | 6
(Poland) K Drzewiecki (Poland) S Walków | 4 | 2
4 | (Spain) D Rincón (Spain) O Roca Batalla | 6 | 4 | [10]
(Czech Republic) F Duda (Ukraine) V Sachko | 3 | 6 | [7]
(Ukraine) O Krutykh (Latvia) R Strombachs | 1 | 1
3 | (Germany) J Schnaitter (Germany) M Wallner | 6 | 6
(Spain) A Barroso Campos (Belgium) M Geerts | 6 | 6
2 | (Sweden) F Bergevi (Netherlands) M Veldheer | 3 | 4

Semifinals
1 | (Pakistan) A-u-H Qureshi (Spain) D Vega Hernández | 7^{7} | 3 | [3]
4 | (Spain) D Rincón (Spain) O Roca Batalla | 6^{4} | 6 | [10]
3 | (Germany) J Schnaitter (Germany) M Wallner | 7^{9} | 6
(Spain) A Barroso Campos (Belgium) M Geerts | 6^{7} | 3

Final
4 | (Spain) D Rincón (Spain) O Roca Batalla | 5 | 6 | [11]
3 | (Germany) J Schnaitter (Germany) M Wallner | 7 | 4 | [9]
