= Salvatore Caruso =

Italian tennis player

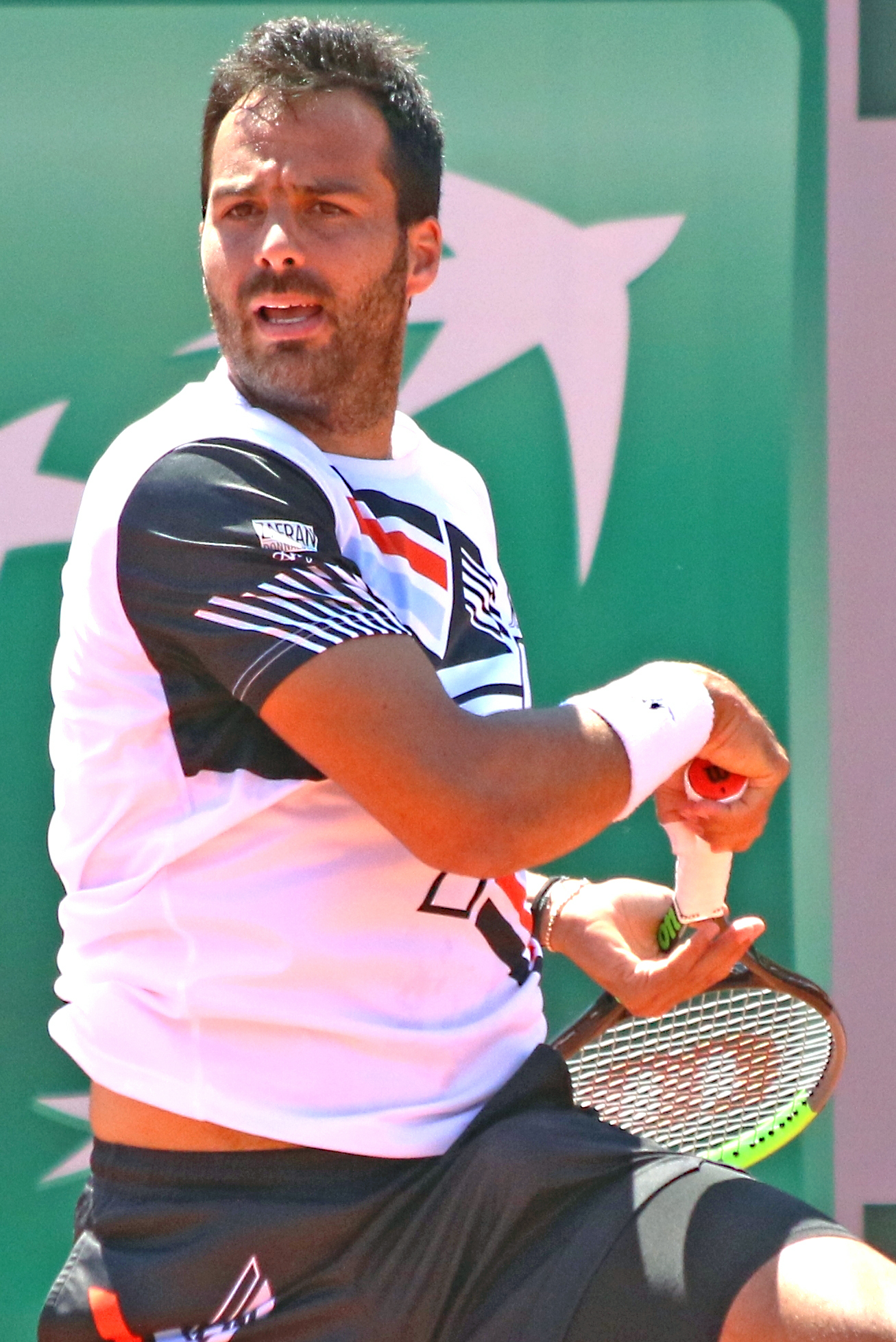
- Caruso at the 2021 French Open
- Country (sports): Italy
- Residence: Avola, Italy
- Born: 15 December 1992 (age 33) Avola, Italy
- Height: 1.85 m (6 ft 1 in)
- Turned pro: 2011
- Retired: 2025
- Plays: Right-handed (two-handed backhand)
- Coach: Paolo Cannova
- Prize money: US $1,922,256

Singles
- Career record: 19–44 (at ATP Tour level, Grand Slam level, and in Davis Cup)
- Career titles: 0
- Highest ranking: No. 76 (16 November 2020)

Grand Slam singles results
- Australian Open: 2R (2021)
- French Open: 3R (2019)
- Wimbledon: 1R (2019, 2021)
- US Open: 3R (2020)

Doubles
- Career record: 5–9 (at ATP Tour level, Grand Slam level, and in Davis Cup)
- Career titles: 0
- Highest ranking: No. 166 (18 January 2021)

Grand Slam doubles results
- Australian Open: 1R (2021)
- French Open: 1R (2021)
- Wimbledon: 1R (2021)
- Last updated on: 19 September 2022.

Salvatore Caruso (Italian pronunciation: [salvaˈtoːre kaˈruːzo]; born 15 December 1992) is an Italian former professional tennis player. He has a career-high ATP singles ranking of No. 76, achieved on 16 November 2020. He also has a career-high ATP doubles ranking of No. 166, achieved on 18 January 2021. Caruso has won 5 ITF Futures singles and two ATP Challenger singles titles, and 4 ITF Futures and one ATP Challenger doubles titles in his career.

== Early life ==
Caruso grew up in Sicily, Italy.

== Career ==
=== 2016 ===
Caruso made his ATP and Masters 1000 main draw debut at the 2016 Italian Open, where he received a main draw wildcard. He lost in the first round to Nick Kyrgios 6–1, 6–2.

=== 2019: Top 100 debut ===
The 2019 season was a season of progress. At the 2019 French Open, he got his first Grand Slam win and later reached the third round. He then lost to world No. 1 Novak Djokovic. A month later, he successful participated in the Umag Open. In the second round, he recorded his biggest win to date against World No. 14 Borna Ćorić and advanced to his first ATP quarterfinal. The quarterfinal win against Facundo Bagnis, allowed him to reach his first ATP semifinal as well. He lost to Dušan Lajović in the semifinal. In early October, he won the Barcelona Challenger and secured his place in the top 100 for the first time.

=== 2020: Career-high ranking ===
Despite not having an impressive season in 2020, Caruso made a bit of progress. At the 2020 US Open, he reached another Grand Slam third round, recording his first two wins there. He then failed to reach fourth round, after losing to Andrey Rublev. Right after that, he defeated Tennys Sandgren in the first round of Italian Open in order to reach his first Masters 1000 second round. However, he lost to then world No. 1 Novak Djokovic.

The end of the season was important for Caruso. At the 2020 Sofia Open he defeated world No. 21 Félix Auger-Aliassime in order to reach the quarterfinal, and secured a career-high-ranking of World No. 76 on 16 November 2020.

=== 2022: Out of top 250 ===
Caruso initially failed to qualify for the main draw of the 2022 Australian Open, losing in the final round of the qualifying stage, but earned a place in the main draw as a lucky loser after World No. 1 Novak Djokovic was deported from Australia due to COVID-19 visa issues related to the ban for unvaccinated visitors. Caruso took Djokovic's original slot at the top of the draw, having been given the position as the schedule for the opening day had already been released. He lost to another Serb, Miomir Kecmanović, in the first round.

=== 2025: Retirement ===
Caruso announced his retirement from professional tennis in May 2025.

== Performance timeline ==
Key
W	F	SF	QF	#R	RR	Q#	DNQ	A	NH

(W) winner; (F) finalist; (SF) semifinalist; (QF) quarterfinalist; (#R) rounds 4, 3, 2, 1; (RR) round-robin stage; (Q#) qualification round; (DNQ) did not qualify; (A) absent; (NH) not held; (SR) strike rate (events won / competed); (W–L) win–loss record.
To avoid confusion and double counting, these charts are updated at the conclusion of a tournament or when the player's participation has ended.

=== Singles ===
Tournament	2014	2015	2016	2017	2018	2019	2020	2021	2022	SR	W–L	Win %
Grand Slam tournaments
Australian Open	A	A	Q1	A	1R	Q1	1R	2R	1R	0 / 4	1–4	20%
French Open	A	A	A	Q2	Q1	3R	1R	1R	Q2	0 / 3	2–3	40%
Wimbledon	A	A	Q1	Q1	Q2	1R	NH	1R	Q3	0 / 2	0–2	0%
US Open	A	A	A	Q1	Q1	Q2	3R	1R	A	0 / 2	2–2	50%
Win–loss	0–0	0–0	0–0	0–0	0–1	2–2	2–3	1–4	0–1	0 / 11	5–11	31%
ATP Tour Masters 1000
Indian Wells Masters	A	A	Q1	A	A	Q2	NH	2R	Q1	0 / 1	1–1	50%
Miami Open	A	A	A	A	A	A	NH	1R	A	0 / 1	0–1	0%
Monte-Carlo Masters	A	A	Q1	A	A	A	NH	2R	A	0 / 1	1–1	50%
Madrid Open	A	A	A	A	A	A	NH	A	A	0 / 0	0–0	–
Italian Open	Q1	Q1	1R	Q1	Q1	A	2R	1R	A	0 / 3	1–3	25%
Canadian Masters	A	A	A	A	A	A	NH	A	A	0 / 0	0–0	–
Cincinnati Masters	A	A	A	A	A	A	1R	A	A	0 / 1	0–1	0%
Shanghai Masters	A	A	A	A	A	A	NH			0 / 0	0–0	–
Paris Masters	A	A	A	A	A	A	1R	A	A	0 / 1	0–1	0%
Win–loss	0–0	0–0	0–1	0–0	0–0	0–0	1–3	3–4	0–0	0 / 8	3–8	27%
Career statistics
Tournaments	0	0	1	1	3	6	13	19	1	Career total: 44		
Overall W–L	0–0	0–0	0–1	0–1	1–3	6–6	7–13	5–19	0–1	0 / 44	19–44	30%
Year-end ranking	455	227	253	204	158	96	76	157		$1,922,256		

=== Doubles ===
Tournament	2021	2022	SR	W–L	Win %
Australian Open	1R	A	0 / 1	0–1	0%
French Open	1R	A	0 / 1	0–1	0%
Wimbledon	1R		0 / 1	0–1	0%
US Open	A		0 / 0	0–0	–
Win–loss	0–3	0–0	0 / 3	0–3	0%

== ATP Tour finals ==
=== Doubles: 1 (1 runner-up) ===
Legend Grand Slam (0–0) ATP Finals (0–0) ATP Masters 1000 (0–0) ATP 500 (0–1) ATP 250 (0–0)	Titles by surface Hard (0–0) Clay (0–1) Grass (0–0)	Titles by setting Outdoor (0–1) Indoor (0–0)

Result	Date	Tournament	Tier	Surface	Partner	Opponents	Score
Loss	Feb 2020	Rio Open, Brazil	500 Series	Clay	(Italy) Federico Gaio	(Spain) Marcel Granollers (Argentina) Horacio Zeballos	4–6, 7–5, [7–10]

== ATP Challenger and ITF Futures finals ==
=== Singles: 17 (8 titles, 9 runners–up) ===
Legend ATP Challenger (2–2) ITF Futures (6–7)	Finals by surface Hard (0–4) Clay (8–5) Grass (0–0) Carpet (0–0)

Result	W–L	Date	Tournament	Tier	Surface	Opponent	Score
Loss	0–1	Aug 2012	Italy F23, Este	Futures	Clay	(Germany) Jan-Lennard Struff	7–6^{(2)}, 2–6, 2–6
Loss	0–2	May 2013	Italy F7, San Margherita di Pula	Futures	Clay	(Argentina) Andrés Molteni	7–5, 1–6, 2–6
Win	1–2	Jun 2013	Italy F12, Padova	Futures	Clay	(Italy) Enrico Burzi	7–6^{(3)}, 6–7^{(3)}, 6–0
Loss	1–3	Nov 2013	Croatia F16, Bol	Futures	Clay	(Bosnia and Herzegovina) Tomislav Brkić	6–4, 5–7, 5–7
Loss	1–4	Sep 2014	USA F24, Claremont	Futures	Hard	(United States) Dennis Nevolo	4–6, 2–6
Win	2–4	Oct 2014	Italy F37, San Margherita di Pula	Futures	Clay	(Italy) Gianluca Naso	6–4, 7–5
Loss	2–5	Jan 2015	Tunisia F2, Port El Kantaoui	Futures	Hard	(Serbia) Danilo Petrovic	4–6, 4–6
Win	3–5	Aug 2015	Italy F21, Bolzano	Futures	Clay	(Italy) Marco Bortolotti	6–3, 6–4
Loss	3–6	Nov 2016	Italy F36, San Margherita di Pula	Futures	Clay	(Italy) Stefano Travaglia	6–4, 2–6, 3–6
Loss	3–7	Mar 2017	Italy F4, Sondrio	Futures	Hard	(Czech Republic) Stefano Michnev	6–7^{(3)}, 4–6
Win	4–7	Apr 2017	Italy F7, San Margherita di Pula	Futures	Clay	(Argentina) Andrea Collarini	7–5, 6–3
Win	5–7	Apr 2017	Italy F9, San Margherita di Pula	Futures	Clay	(Brazil) Guilherme Clezar	6–3, 6–3
Loss	5–8	Aug 2017	Challenger Pulcra Lachiter Biella, Italy	Challenger	Hard	(Serbia) Filip Krajinović	3–6, 2–6
Win	6–8	Sep 2018	Città di Como Challenger, Italy	Challenger	Clay	(Chile) Cristian Garín	7–5, 6–4
Win	7–8	Oct 2019	Sánchez-Casal Cup – Barcelona, Spain	Challenger	Clay	(Slovakia) Jozef Kovalík	6–4, 6–2
Loss	7–9	Oct 2020	Emilia-Romagna Open – Parma, Italy	Challenger	Clay	(United States) Frances Tiafoe	3–6, 6–3, 4–6
Win	8–9	Oct 2023	Italy M25, San Margherita di Pula, Italy	Futures	Clay	(Italy) Marcello Serafini	6–7^{(4–7)}, 7–6^{(7–4)}, 6–3

=== Doubles: 11 (5 titles, 6 runners–up) ===
Legend ATP Challenger (1–4) ITF Futures (4–2)	Finals by surface Hard (1–1) Clay (4–5) Grass (0–0) Carpet (0–0)

Result	W–L	Date	Tournament	Tier	Surface	Partner	Opponents	Score
Win	1–0	Apr 2013	Greece F3, Heraklion	Futures	Hard	(Canada) Érik Chvojka	(Belgium) Julien Cagnina (Belgium) Germain Gigounon	6–4, 6–2
Loss	1–1	Jun 2013	Italy F14, Siena	Futures	Clay	(Italy) Antonio Massara	(Italy) Claudio Grassi (Italy) Adelchi Virgili	1–6, 4–6
Win	2–1	Mar 2014	Italy F4, Palermo	Futures	Clay	(Italy) Omar Giacalone	(Italy) Davide Melchiorre (Italy) Riccardo Sinicropi	6–1, 6–3
Win	3–1	Mar 2014	Italy F7, San Margherita di Pula	Futures	Clay	(Italy) Filippo Baldi	(Italy) Francesco Borgo (Italy) Marco Speronello	6–3, 6–2
Win	4–1	Oct 2014	Italy F36, San Margherita di Pula	Futures	Clay	(Italy) Gianluca Naso	(Italy) D. Della Tommasina (Italy) Walter Trusendi	6–6, 6–3, [10–8]
Loss	4–2	Oct 2014	Italy F37, San Margherita di Pula	Futures	Clay	(Italy) Gianluca Naso	(Italy) Pietro Rondoni (Italy) Riccardo Bonadio	5–7, 6–3, [3–10]
Loss	4–3	May 2015	Internazionali di Città di Vicenza, Italy	Challenger	Clay	(Italy) Federico Gaio	(Argentina) Facundo Bagnis (Argentina) Guido Pella	2–6, 4–6
Loss	4–4	Jul 2016	Internazionali di Città di Todi, Italy	Challenger	Clay	(Italy) Alessandro Giannessi	(Brazil) Marcelo Demoliner (Brazil) Fabrício Neis	1–6, 6–3, [6–10]
Win	5–4	Jul 2017	Internazionali di Città di Perugia, Italy	Challenger	Clay	(France) Jonathan Eysseric	(Argentina) Nicolás Kicker (Brazil) Fabrício Neis	6–3, 6–3
Loss	5–5	Oct 2018	Firenze Tennis Cup, Italy	Challenger	Clay	(Italy) Filippo Baldi	(Australia) Rameez Junaid (Netherlands) David Pel	5–7, 6–3, [7–10]
Loss	5–6	Oct 2021	Brest Challenger, France	Challenger	Hard (i)	(Italy) Federico Gaio	(France) Sadio Doumbia (France) Fabien Reboul	6–4, 3–6, [3–10]

== Record against top 10 players ==
Caruso's match record against players who have been ranked in the top 10. Only ATP Tour main draw and Davis Cup matches are considered. Former No. 1 players in bold, retired players in italics.

- (France) Gilles Simon 1–1
- (South Africa) Kevin Anderson 0–1
- (Cyprus) Marcos Baghdatis 0–1
- (Italy) Fabio Fognini 0–1
- (France) Richard Gasquet 0–1
- (Belgium) David Goffin 0–1
- (United States) John Isner 0–1
- (Japan) Kei Nishikori 0–1
- (Greece) Stefanos Tsitsipas 0–1
- (Serbia) **Novak Djokovic** 0–2
- (Russia) Andrey Rublev 0–2

* As of 31 August 2021.
