= Dimitar Kuzmanov =

Bulgarian tennis player (born 1993)

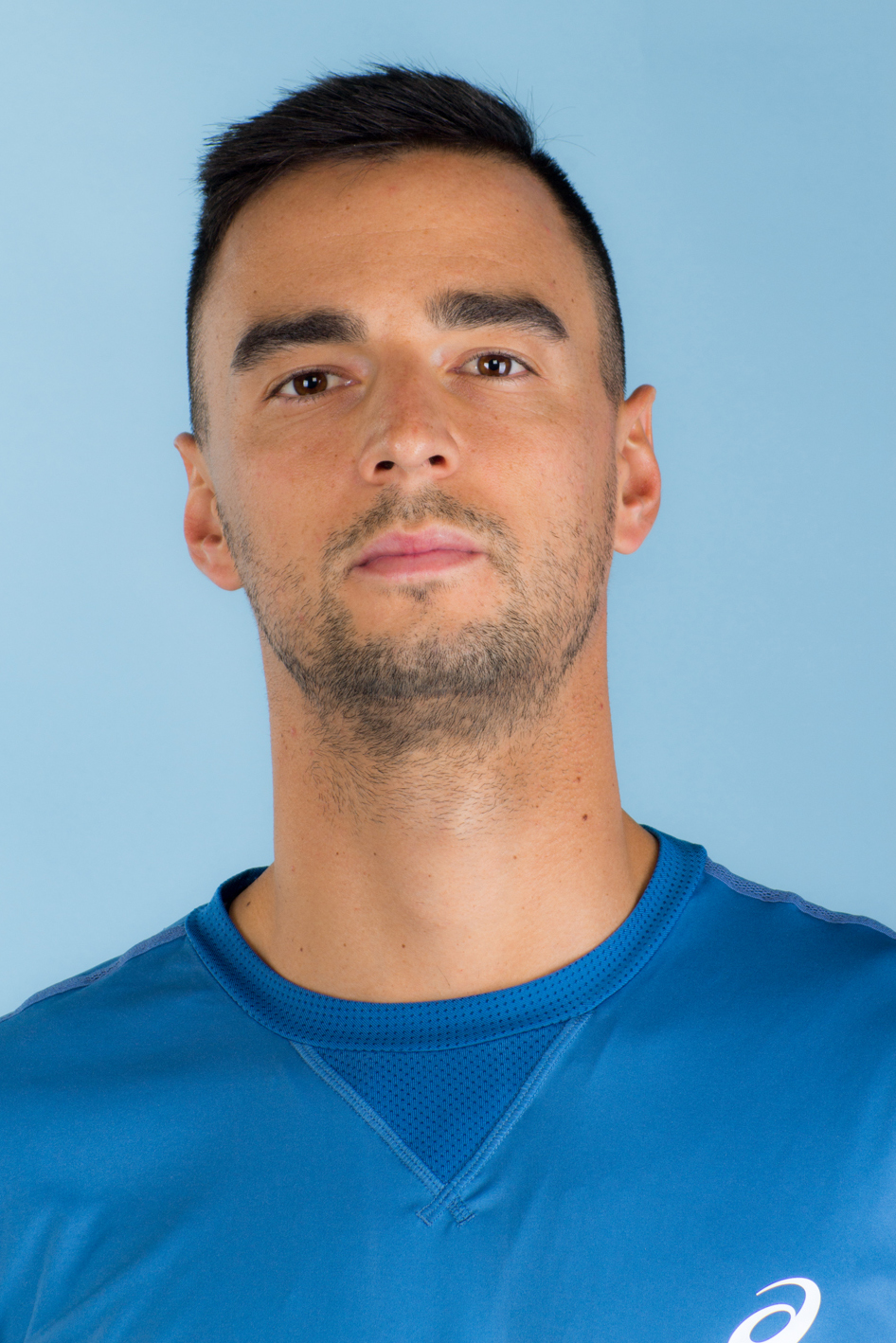
- Country (sports): Bulgaria
- Residence: Plovdiv, Bulgaria
- Born: 28 July 1993 (age 33) Plovdiv, Bulgaria
- Height: 1.83 m (6 ft 0 in)
- Turned pro: 2009
- Plays: Right-handed (two-handed backhand)
- Coach: Stefan Rangelov (1999–), Valentin Dimov (2019–2021)
- Prize money: US $956,055

Singles
- Career record: 21–20 (at ATP Tour level, Grand Slam level, and in Davis Cup)
- Career titles: 0
- Highest ranking: No. 159 (29 August 2022)
- Current ranking: No. 358 (26 October 2026)

Grand Slam singles results
- Australian Open: Q2 (2022)
- French Open: Q3 (2022)
- Wimbledon: Q3 (2022)
- US Open: Q3 (2022)

Doubles
- Career record: 1–8 (at ATP Tour level, Grand Slam level, and in Davis Cup)
- Career titles: 0
- Highest ranking: No. 438 (1 April 2019)
- Last updated on: 26 October 2026.

Dimitar Kuzmanov (Bulgarian: Димитър Кузманов, pronounced [diˈmitɐr ˈkuzmɐnɔf]; nickname: Miko; born 28 July 1993) is a Bulgarian professional tennis player who competes on the ATP Tour. He has a career-high ATP singles ranking of No. 159 achieved on 29 August 2022 and a doubles ranking of No. 438 achieved on 1 April 2019. He participated in all 4 Grand Slams ( Australian Open, Roland Garros, Wimbledon and Us Open) multiple times.

He is all time best singles player for Bulgaria in Davis cup with 24 singles wins in 26 ties he played.

== Early years and personal life ==
Dimitar Kuzmanov was born in Plovdiv, Bulgaria, the son of Savko Kuzmanov (an aeronautical engineer) and Dora Rangelova (Bulgaria Fed Cup team's former tennis player and present team captain). His maternal family is entirely related to the sport. Dora's father Zdravko Rangelov, who is one of the founders of tennis in Plovdiv, has been a tennis player and longtime coach in Tennis Club Lokomotiv, whilst her mother has been a volleyball player and coach. Dora's brother, Stefan Rangelov is a former tennis player and present tennis coach. Kuzmanov began playing tennis aged six when his mother Dora took him to play on courts of Tennis Club Lokomotiv Plovdiv, and Stefan was the man, that gave him a tennis racket and started training. Through the years, Dimitar Kuzmanov has established himself as a player who has won many national and international tournaments, he is a champion of Bulgaria in different age groups and participant in Bulgaria national tennis teams, including Davis Cup team.

== Junior career ==
=== 2005–2007: Tennis Europe Junior Tour ===
Dimitar Kuzmanov joined the Tennis Europe Junior Tour competition in 2005. During this period he played very successfully, achieving a record of 57–16 W/L (MD only) and No. 1 in Tennis Europe Junior Ranking (see below). He won 5 (singles) titles: Dema Cup U12 – Sofia and Haskovo Cup U16 – Haskovo, in Bulgaria; Novi Sad Open Raiffeisen Cup U16 – Novi Sad, Serbia; 45th Torneo del Avvenire U16 – Milan and 5th Edizione Torneo Int. U16 Memorial Tato Serina – Crema in Italy and 2 (doubles) titles: Dema Cup U12 – Sofia, Bulgaria and ''Novi Sad open Raiffeisen Cup U16 – Novi Sad, Serbia.

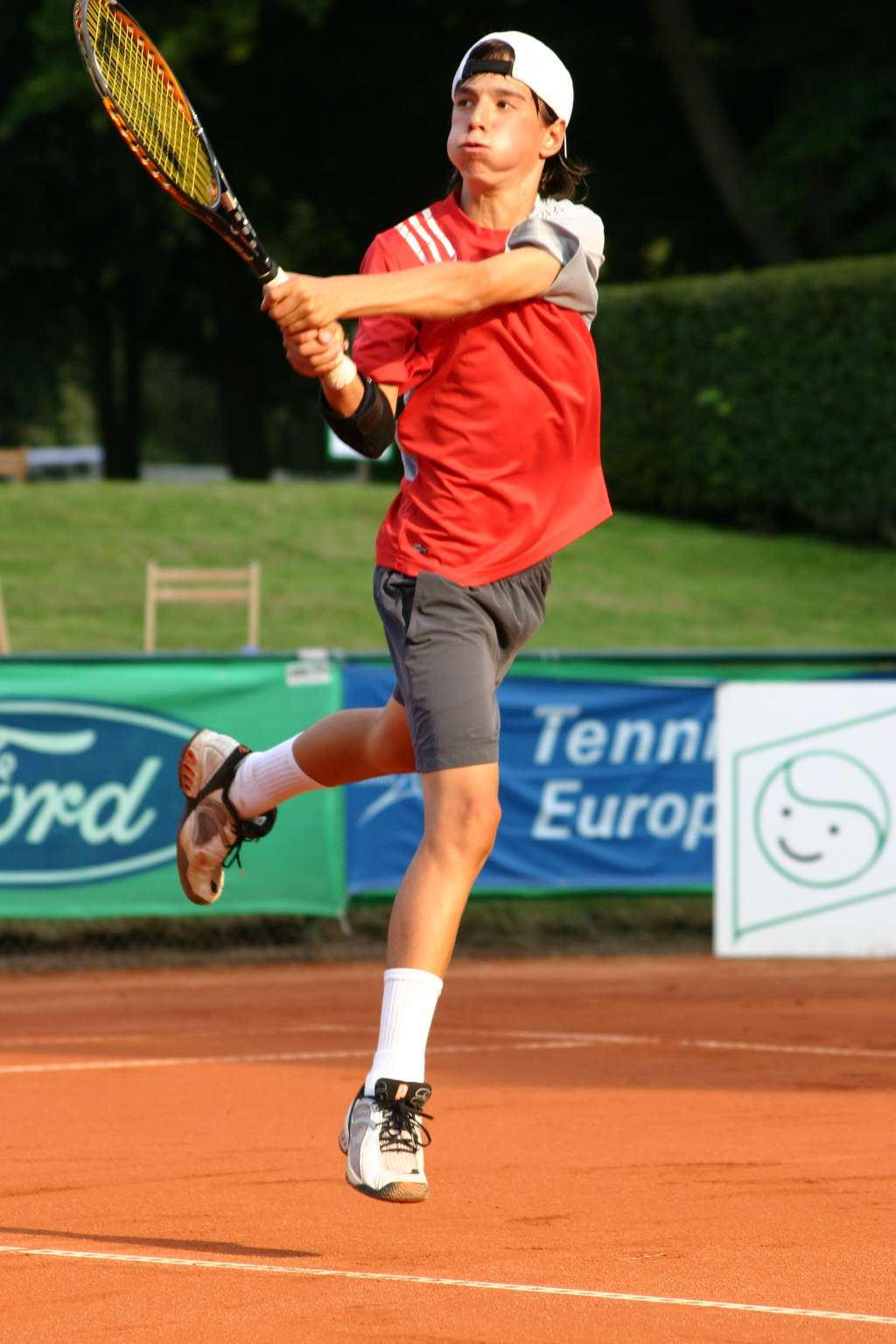
D. Kuzmanov at Tennis Europe Junior Tour

In addition, Kuzmanov played final of the tournaments: BBB Cup U14 – Sofia, Bulgaria; Trofeo Ajuntament De Torello U16 – Torello, Spain; 6th Citta di Montecatini U16 – Montecatini, Italy; Le Pont des Generations U16 – Le Pont, France; Bergant Memorial 2008 U16 – Maribor, Slovenia and semi-final of the tournaments: Bankia Cup U14 – Bankia, Bulgaria; Citta di Pescara U14 – Pescara, Italy; Tennis Jungsten Cup U14 – Koln, Germany; Raiffeisen Jason Cup U16 – Novi Sad, Serbia; Galeja Open Raiffeisen Cup U16 – Maribor, Slovenia and Mondial Paris Cadets Trophee Lagardere U16 – Paris, France.

In 2007 Kuzmanov played semi-final at East European Tennis Championship U14 – Tallinn, Estonia.

Because of his performance in the tournament, he was invited in ITF U14 & U16 Development Programme, that supported him from 2007 to 2009. As a result, 2009 became most successful year of this period (see below).

=== 2008–2011: ITF Junior Tennis ===
Kuzmanov started playing in ITF Junior Circuit in 2008 and even in his third participation in tournaments of this level he reached to a final – it happened at Dema Cup U18 – Sofia, Bulgaria, where he lost in a very competitive match. During the period 2008 – 2011 he made a record of 53–24 W/L in singles matches and 17–18 W/L in doubles matches in the main draw only. His most significant achievements are reaching to a final singles match at 2011 European Junior Championships U18 – Klosters, Switzerland and semi-final doubles match at 2011 Roland Garros Junior Championships U18 – Paris, France, as well as winning 2 singles titles at Plovdiv Cup U18 – Plovdiv and Kenana CUP U18 – Haskovo in Bulgaria. In addition, Kuzmanov played 4 singles finals: 12th Serbia Junior Open U18 – Novi Sad, Serbia; Plovdiv Cup U18 – Plovdiv, Bulgaria; 33rd Profstav Slovakia Cup U18 – 2011 – Piestani, Slovakia; Dema Cup U18 – Sofia, Bulgaria and 2 doubles finals: Plovdiv Cup U18 – Plovdiv, Bulgaria and Copa Milo-ChileDeportes 2010 U18 – Santiago, Chile as well as 1 singles semi-final: 23rd Czech International Junior Indoor Championships U18 – Prerov, Czech Republic.

== Professional career ==
=== 2009–2010: Professional debut ===
Dimitar Kuzmanov made his professional debut at Bulgaria F2 ITF Futures Tournament – at age of 15 years and 9 months. Late in season, he played 2 more ITF Futures tournaments and won his first ATP ranking points. He continued to play tournaments at Tennis Europe and ITF Junior level and this year is definitely one of his most successful years as a junior player. Kuzmanov rose to No. 1 for Boys U16 in Tennis Europe Ranking (26 June 2009) and was honored as "Player of the Tennis Europe Junior for Boys U16 – 2009" becoming the first Bulgarian in the history who had won this prestigious award for this age group. He finished the year as No. 1 in Tennis Europe Ranking.

He continued to play ITF Junior Circuit and ITF Futures tournaments. He won the Academic Tennis tournament, organised by Bulgarian Tennis Federation.

=== 2011: Davis Cup and top 1000 debut ===
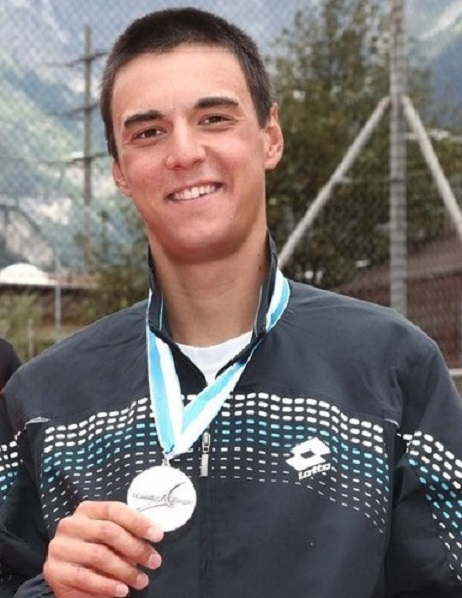
2nd place – Kuzmanov at 2011 European Tennis Junior Championship

The last year of playing ITF Junior Circuit tournaments was the most successful at this level. Kuzmanov became European vice-champion at 2011 European Junior Championships for Boys U18 – Klosters, Switzerland and played doubles semifinal (Partnering with Miki Jamkovic, SRB) at 2011 ITF Roland Garos Junior Championships – Paris, France. He raised his ATP ranking up to position No. 898 at the year end.

2011 is important as it is the year of Dimitar Kuzmanov's first participation at Davis Cup Event (vs. Belarus and later vs. Cyprus).

=== 2012: First doubles ITF title ===
He won his first doubles title at ITF Futures F10 Tournament – Antalya, Turkey, partnering compatriot Tihomir Grozdanov. Late during the season, he played few singles and doubles finals and semi-finals at ITF Futures tournaments. As a Davis Cup player he played vs. Albania, Georgia and Macedonia.

=== 2013: First singles ITF title, top 500 debut ===
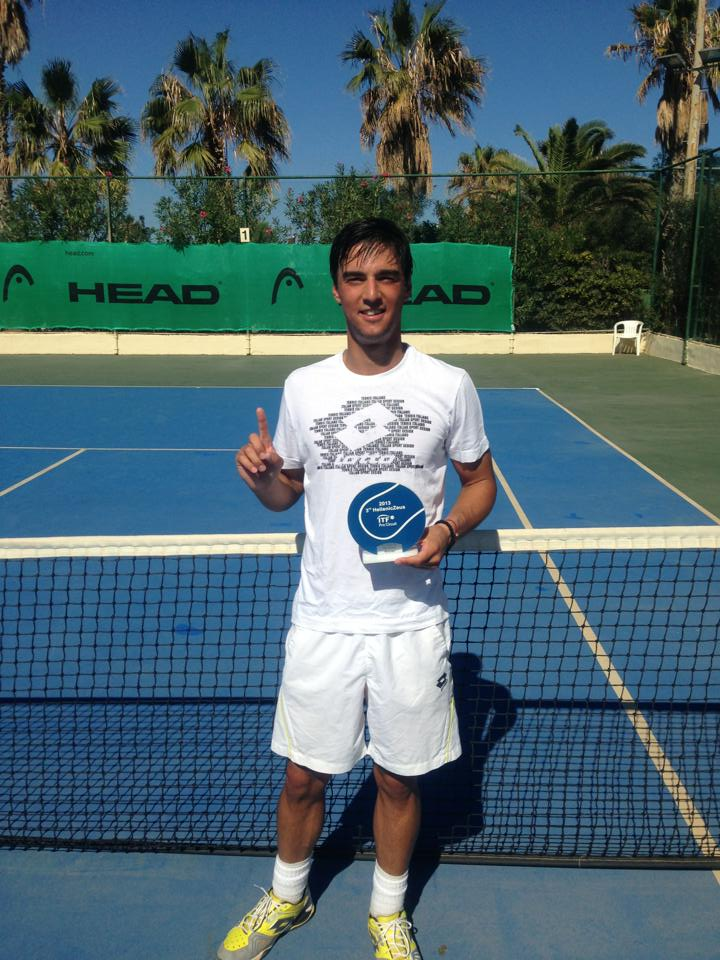
D. Kuzmanov – 1st ITF Title

First singles title at Greece F5 ITF Futures Tournament (vs. Andrew Whittington (AUS) 6–1 6–2).

Late during the season, he won one more singles title at Greece F15 ITF Futures Tournament (vs. Torsten Wietoska (GER) 6–1 6–2) and played few singles and doubles finals and semi finals at ITF Futures tournaments.

First participation in the qualifying draw singles (QDS) at ATP Challenger Tour – Petange Challenger, Luxembourg. As a Davis Cup player he played vs. Finland and Estonia.

=== 2014–2015: Challenger and top 300 debut ===
First participation in the main draw singles (MDS) at the ATP Challenger Tour – Istanbul Challenger, Turkey. Late during the season, he won 4 singles titles and 1 doubles title, played few singles and doubles finals and semifinals at ITF Futures tournaments.

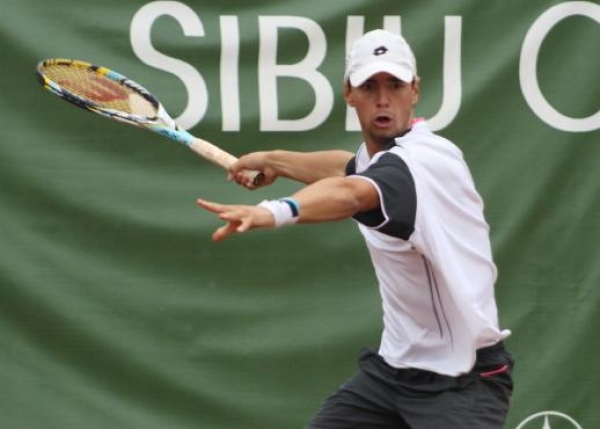
D. Kuzmanov at Sibiu Open Challenger

In 2015 Kuzmanov continued to play ITF Futures tournaments and reached 8 singles finals, winning 5 titles and 4 doubles finals, winning 3 titles, as well as he played 2 singles and 2 doubles semi-finals. Late during the season, he made his debut in the qualifying draw singles (QDS) at the ATP World Tour 250 tournament in Istanbul and reached the quarterfinals of the ATP Challenger Sibiu Open in Romania. As a Davis Cup player he played vs. Latvia, Luxembourg and Hungary.

=== 2016: ATP debut as a wildcard at the Sofia Open ===
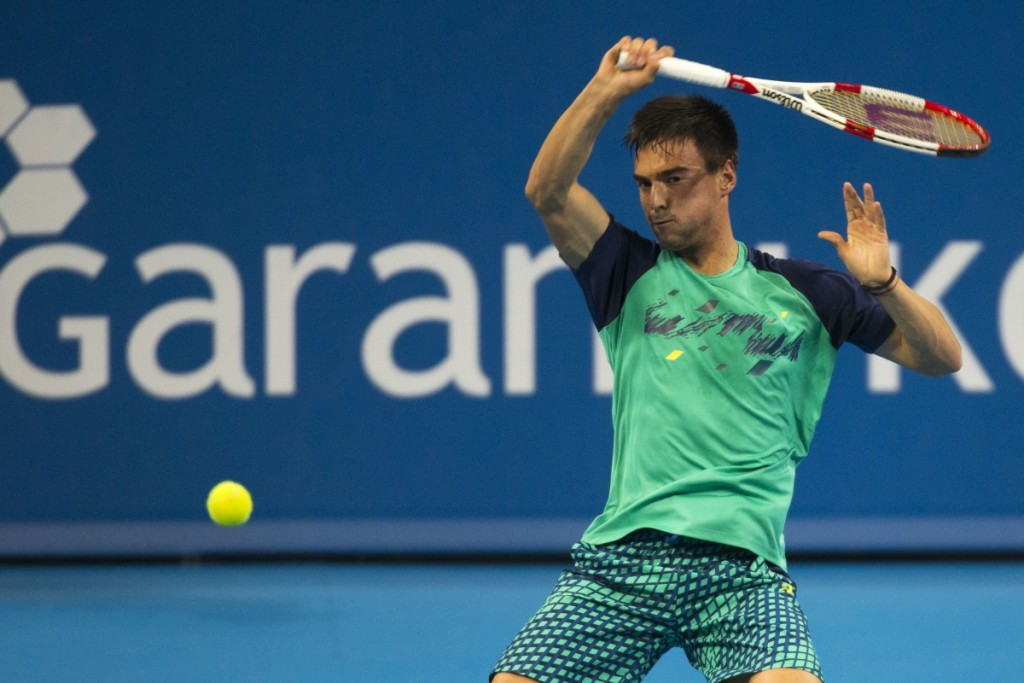
D. Kuzmanov at Sofia Open 2016

Kuzmanov received a wildcard for the ATP World Tour 250 tournament Sofia Open and made his ATP main draw debut, losing in three sets by the world No. 96 Ričardas Berankis. Partnering with compatriot Alexander Lazov he played vs. future tournament champions Matwe Middelkoop and Wesley Koolhof, losing in three sets. Late during the season, he played five singles finals, one doubles final, one singles and one doubles semi-finals at ITF Futures level, as well as QF at ATP Challenger Tour Marburg Open, Germany. As a Davis Cup player Kuzmanov played vs. Turkey and was nominated to play vs. Tunisia, but he didn't play because of trauma.

=== 2017: First top-100 win ===
In this year Kuzmanov continued to play ITF Futures tournaments and won singles title No. 12 and Doubles title No. 6. In addition during the season, he reached 1 singles and 1 doubles finals and 4 singles and 4 doubles semi-finals at this level tournaments. In February he participated at the ATP World Tour 250 tournament 2017 Sofia Open. In a MDS first round match he lost 4-6/3-6 to world No. 57 Robin Haase (NED). Partnering with compatriot Alexander Lazov he played in the main draw doubles (MDD) and won 6-4/6-7(9)/10-7 vs. Ariel Behar and Andrei Vasilevski. In the quarterfinal match vs. Alexander Peya and Mate Pavic they lost 2-6/4-6.

Closing the season Kuzmanov participated in 1 ITF Futures tournament and 4 ATP Challenger Tour events in South America achieving 18 wins in 22 matches. His most successful participation in the tour was at the Lima Challenger Event – a quarterfinal showing in MDS where he lost to world No. 108 Marco Cecchinato (ITA) 6–7(3)/3-6. Before that, however, he managed to record his first victory over a top 100 player – in the match against Roberto Carballes Baena (ESP). The participation at Santiago 2 Challenger Event was also successful – partnering with Gonçalo Oliveira (POR) he reached the quarterfinals in MDD, losing 1-6/3-6/ by the Brazilian players Guilherme Clezar and Fabricio Neis. As a Davis Cup player Kuzmanov played vs. Armenia, Greece and Ireland winning all his own single matches.

=== 2018–2019: Fourth Sofia Open wildcard ===
Dimitar Kuzmanov started the year in a remarkable way – he participated in January and February in 4 ITF Futures tournaments winning two of them, and the other two playing the final with 18 victories and only 2 losses. In addition, between these tournaments he participated at ATP 250 2018 Sofia Open tournament as a wildcard and lost his MDS first round match 6–7(6)/1-6 by the world No. 68 João Sousa (POR). Partnering with compatriot Vasko Mladenov he played in MDD and lost 4-6/4-6 by Scott Lipsky (USA) and Divij Sharan (IND).

He participated in the 2019 Sofia Open for the fourth time as a wildcard where he also lost in the first round to Robin Haase in straight sets.

=== 2020–2021: First ATP wins & Challenger title, Major qualifications & Top 200 ===
Kuzmanov participated in the inaugural 2020 ATP Cup as the No. 2 player from Bulgaria, where he recorded his first and second ATP match wins against the No. 2 players from Belgium Steve Darcis and from Moldova Alexander Cozbinov.

In March 2021, Kuzmanov reached his first ATP Challenger final at the Zadar Open in Croatia which he lost 6-2/2-6/6-7(5) to Serbian Nikola Milojevic. It was the longest Challenger final for the season registered at three hours and seven minutes. A week later, in April, he followed with a quarterfinal showing at the Open de Oeiras Challenger. Thanks to these great results, he reached his best singles ranking of World No. 237 in singles.

Kuzmanov made his Grand Slam debut at the 2021 French Open as a qualifier in singles where he lost to No. 12 seeded Bolivian Hugo Dellien in three sets. He also entered the qualifications at the 2021 Wimbledon Championships for the first time in his career where he also lost to Marius Copil in straight sets. He lost in the first round of qualifications to Copil again at the 2021 US Open.

Kuzmanov received a wildcard at the 2021 Sofia Open for the sixth year in a row. He defeated Lorenzo Musetti in a tight three set match over 3 hours to finally record his first win at his home tournament. Kuzmanov became the second Bulgarian to win a match in the main draw in Sofia after Grigor Dimitrov, who won the tournament title in 2017. As a result, he reached a new career-high ranking of No. 218 on 4 October 2021.

In the following week Kuzmanov made another strong showing at the 2021 Sánchez-Casal Cup in Barcelona, where he won his maiden ATP Challenger title, becoming just the fifth Bulgarian champion in ATP Challenger Tour's history and the first since Grigor Dimitrov in 2011. He did not lose a set against former World No. 5 Tommy Robredo, 4th seed Damir Dzumhur, Teymuraz Gabashvili and 2nd seed Alex Molcan en route to the final, in which he beat the top seed Hugo Gaston 6–3 6–0. As a result, he reached a new career-high ranking of No. 189 on 18 October 2021 breaking into the top 200 for the first time.

=== 2022: First Major qualification win, top 160, Seventh Sofia Open wildcard ===
After losing in the first qualifying round in his first three Grand Slam appearances in 2021, Kuzmanov recorded his maiden win at that level at the 2022 Australian Open. The Bulgarian advanced to the second round of qualifying after a 4–6 6–3 7–6(5) win over Daniel Masur before bowing out to Tobias Kamke in the next round.

In February, Kuzmanov defeated the 2nd and 3rd seeds Hugo Grenier and Enzo Couacaud at the Bengaluru Open on the way to his third ATP Challenger final, where he lost in straight sets to top seed Aleksandar Vukic.

In May he reached the third round of qualifying at the 2022 French Open defeating Flavio Cobolli in three sets, getting one step closer to the main draw. He lost to Santiago Rodriguez Taverna in the third round of qualifying. Kuzmanov repeated his success at the 2022 Wimbledon Championships, where he once again reached the third round of qualifying, but ultimately couldn't make the step further to his maiden main draw appearance, losing out in four sets to Enzo Couacaud. At the US Open he reached the third round of qualifying for the third time in a row but bowed out to the No. 303 ranked ATP tour debutant Brandon Holt.

For the seventh year in a row Kuzmanov received a main draw wildcard at the 2022 Sofia Open, but he couldn't replicate his last year's success and lost in straight sets to qualifier Ugo Humbert in the first round.

He finished the season in the top 200 for the second year in a row at No. 195 on 21 November 2022. Two days later he was confirmed as a participant at the inaugural 2023 United Cup as part of the Bulgarian team.

=== 2023–2025: United Cup debut, Two Challenger titles ===
He won his second Challenger title at the 2024 President's Cup in Astana, Kazakhstan and became the oldest Bulgarian champion in Challenger history (since 1978). As a result, he returned to the top 300 in the rankings climbing more than 50 spots up.

Paired with Kazakhstani player Timofey Skatov Kuzmanov reached the quarterfinals in doubles at the newly established 2025 Crete Challenger defeating top seeds Christoph Negritu and Alexander Merino. He also won his third singles title at the second edition of the Crete Challenger after defeating Federico Cinà in straight sets in the final.

== Coaching ==
Kuzmanov first and main coach is his uncle Stefan Rangelov. Kuzmanov was also trained by former tennis player Valentin Dimov and by Bulgaria Fed Cup team's former tennis player and present captain, his mother Dora Rangelova.

== Year-end ATP ranking ==
Year	2009	2010	2011	2012	2013	2014	2015	2016	2017	2018	2019	2020	2021	2022	2023	2024	2025
Singles	1353	1126	893	547	463	419	291	433	384	329	423	295	187	196	207	336	263
Doubles	-	1220	1240	871	1363	1010	453	1231	489	442	2123	1162	691	997	1237	1239	1342

== ATP Challenger and ITF Tour Finals ==
=== Singles: 44 (23 titles, 21 runner-ups) ===
Legend (singles) ATP Challenger Tour (3–4) ITF Futures/World Tennis Tour (20–17)	Titles by surface Hard (15–9) Clay (8–12) Grass (0–0) Carpet (0–0)

Result	W–L	Date	Tournament	Tier	Surface	Opponent	Score
Loss	0–1	Aug 2012	Turkey F32, İzmir	Futures	Clay	(Italy) Alberto Brizzi	6–7^{(3–7)}, 1–6
Win	1–1	May 2013	Greece F5, Heraklion	Futures	Hard	(Australia) Andrew Whittington	6–1, 6–2
Loss	1–2	Aug 2013	Serbia F9, Novi Sad	Futures	Clay	(Spain) Carlos Gómez-Herrera	6–3, 1–6, 2–6
Win	2–2	Oct 2013	Greece F15, Heraklion	Futures	Hard	(Germany) Torsten Wietoska	6–1, 6–2
Win	3–2	Jun 2014	Bulgaria F1, Burgas	Futures	Clay	(Colombia) Juan Sebastián Gómez	6–4, 6–3
Win	4–2	Aug 2014	Turkey F28, Antalya	Futures	Hard	(France) Yannick Jankovits	6–1, 6–1
Win	5–2	Aug 2014	Turkey F29, Antalya	Futures	Hard	(Turkey) Cem İlkel	6–1, 6–3
Win	6–2	Oct 2014	Turkey F35, Antalya	Futures	Hard	(Russia) Andrei Plotniy	6–1, 6–0
Loss	6–3	Feb 2015	Turkey F6, Antalya	Futures	Hard	(Netherlands) Miliaan Niesten	2–6, 3–6
Win	7–3	Feb 2015	Turkey F7, Antalya	Futures	Hard	(Germany) Marc Sieber	7–5, 6–3
Win	8–3	Mar 2015	Turkey F12, Antalya	Futures	Hard	(Serbia) Miki Janković	2–6, 6–0, 6–3
Loss	8–4	Jun 2015	Bulgaria F2, Burgas	Futures	Clay	(Japan) Yasutaka Uchiyama	7–5, 4–6, 2–6
Win	9–4	Aug 2015	Tunisia F19, El Kantaoui	Futures	Hard	(Russia) Ivan Nedelko	w/o
Win	10–4	Aug 2015	Tunisia F20, El Kantaoui	Futures	Hard	(Spain) David Pérez Sanz	6–4, 6–3
Win	11–4	Oct 2015	Turkey F42, Antalya	Futures	Hard	(Croatia) Mate Delić	0–6, 7–6^{(10–8)}, 6–1
Loss	11–5	Dec 2015	Turkey F48, Antalya	Futures	Clay	(Spain) Pere Riba	2–6, 6–3, 6–7^{(3–7)}
Loss	11–6	Feb 2016	Turkey F7, Antalya	Futures	Hard	(South Korea) Hong Seong-chan	4–6, 3–6
Loss	11–7	Feb 2016	Turkey F8, Antalya	Futures	Hard	(Russia) Roman Safiullin	6–3, 5–7, 5–7
Loss	11–8	May 2016	Turkey F20, Antalya	Futures	Hard	(Belgium) Christopher Heyman	6–3, 3–6, 4–6
Loss	11–9	Jun 2016	Bulgaria F4, Plovdiv	Futures	Clay	(Spain) Pedro Martínez	6–7^{(5–7)}, 2–6
Loss	11–10	Oct 2016	Turkey F43, Antalya	Futures	Hard	(Netherlands) Tallon Griekspoor	4–6, 4–6
Loss	11–11	May 2017	Bulgaria F1, Sozopol	Futures	Hard	(France) Albano Olivetti	4–6, 6–7^{(5–7)}
Win	12–11	Jun 2017	Turkey F24, Istanbul	Futures	Clay	(Germany) Marc Sieber	6–3, 2–6, 6–1
Loss	12–12	Oct 2017	Turkey F38, Antalya	Futures	Clay	(Kazakhstan) Dmitry Popko	5–7, 6–3, 3–6
Loss	12–13	Jan 2018	Turkey F2, Antalya	Futures	Hard	(Belgium) Zizou Bergs	3–6, 4–6
Win	13–13	Jan 2018	Turkey F3, Antalya	Futures	Hard	(Croatia) Mate Delić	6–3, 6–4
Loss	13–14	Feb 2018	Turkey F7, Antalya	Futures	Hard	(Hungary) Attila Balázs	1–6, 3–6
Win	14–14	Mar 2018	Turkey F8, Antalya	Futures	Hard	(Italy) Flavio Cipolla	6–3, 6–0
Win	15–14	Jun 2018	Germany F4, Kaltenkirchen	Futures	Clay	(Germany) Marvin Möller	6–2, 6–3
Win	16–14	Jul 2018	Germany F5, Kamen	Futures	Clay	(United States) Sekou Bangoura	6–1, 7–5
Win	17–14	Aug 2018	Poland F8, Poznań	Futures	Clay	(Netherlands) Gijs Brouwer	6–4, 6–1
Loss	17–15	Oct 2018	Italy F33, Santa Margherita Di Pula	Futures	Clay	(Italy) Raúl Brancaccio	4–6, 4–6
Win	18–15	May 2019	M15 Antalya, Turkey	World Tennis Tour	Clay	(Ukraine) Oleg Prihodko	3–6, 6–2, 6–1
Win	19–15	Nov 2019	M15 Antalya, Turkey	World Tennis Tour	Clay	(Argentina) Hernán Casanova	6–4, 2–6, 6–1
Win	20–15	Dec 2019	M15 Doha, Qatar	World Tennis Tour	Hard	(Ukraine) Danylo Kalenichenko	6–0, 6–4
Loss	20–16	Aug 2020	M25 Vogau, Austria	World Tennis Tour	Clay	(France) Manuel Guinard	3–6, 3–6
Loss	20–17	Aug 2020	M25 Poznań, Poland	World Tennis Tour	Clay	(Poland) Kacper Żuk	6–7^{(6–8)}, 1–6
Loss	20–18	Mar 2021	Zadar, Croatia	Challenger	Clay	(Serbia) Nikola Milojević	6–2, 2–6, 6–7^{(5–7)}
Win	21–18	Oct 2021	Barcelona, Spain	Challenger	Clay	(France) Hugo Gaston	6–3, 6–0
Loss	21–19	Feb 2022	Bengaluru, India	Challenger	Hard	(Australia) Aleksandar Vukic	4–6, 4–6
Loss	21–20	Jun 2023	Bratislava, Slovakia	Challenger	Clay	(Ukraine) Vitaliy Sachko	6–2, 2–6, 6–7^{(2–7)}
Win	22–20	Jul 2024	Astana, Kazakhstan	Challenger	Hard	(Georgia (country)) Saba Purtseladze	6–4, 6–3
Win	23–20	Mar 2025	Hersonissos, Greece	Challenger	Hard	(Italy) Federico Cinà	6–4, 6–2
Loss	23–21	June 2025	Royan, France	Challenger	Clay	(France) Titouan Droguet	6–4, 1–6, 4–6

=== Doubles: 11 (6–5) ===
Legend (doubles) ATP Challenger Tour (0–0) ITF Futures/World Tennis Tour (6–5)	Titles by surface Hard (4–3) Clay (2–2) Grass (0–0) Carpet (0–0)

Result	W–L	Date	Tournament	Tier	Surface	Partner	Opponents	Score
Loss	0–1	Aug 2009	Bulgaria F7, Dobrich	Futures	Clay	(Bulgaria) Tzvetan Mihov	(Spain) Carlos Calderón-Rodríguez (Spain) Gerard Granollers	7–6^{(7–1)}, 3–6, [3–10]
Win	1–1	Mar 2012	Turkey F10, Antalya	Futures	Clay	(Bulgaria) Tihomir Grozdanov	(Serbia) Ivan Bjelica (Serbia) Arsenije Zlatanović	6–3, 6–3
Loss	1–2	May 2012	Bulgaria F1, Varna	Futures	Clay	(Bulgaria) Valentin Dimov	(Ukraine) Aleksandr Nedovyesov (Ukraine) Ivan Sergeyev	1–6, 1–6
Win	2–2	May 2014	Turkey F16, Antalya	Futures	Hard	(Venezuela) Ricardo Rodríguez	(France) Hugo Grenier (India) Ramkumar Ramanathan	w/o
Loss	2–3	Oct 2014	Turkey F35, Antalya	Futures	Hard	(Turkey) Tuna Altuna	(Japan) Takashi Saito (Japan) Kaichi Uchida	5–7, 3–6
Win	3–3	Feb 2015	Turkey F5, Antalya	Futures	Hard	(Venezuela) Ricardo Rodríguez	(Israel) Dekel Bar (Mexico) Lucas Gómez	2–6, 6–3, [10–8]
Win	4–3	Mar 2015	Turkey F11, Antalya	Futures	Hard	(Venezuela) Ricardo Rodríguez	(Spain) Marc Fornell (Spain) Marco Neubau	6–4, 6–1
Loss	4–4	Aug 2015	Tunisia F19, El Kantaoui	Futures	Hard	(Spain) David Pérez Sanz	(Germany) Milen Ianakiev (Peru) Alexander Merino	5–7, 6–1, [5–10]
Win	5–4	Aug 2015	Tunisia F20, El Kantaoui	Futures	Hard	(Spain) David Pérez Sanz	(United States) Jordan Dyke (Argentina) Eduardo Agustin Torre	6–3, 6–7^{(3–7)}, [10–7]
Loss	5–5	Oct 2016	Turkey F43, Antalya	Futures	Hard	(Bulgaria) Alexandar Lazov	(Ukraine) Vadim Ursu (Ukraine) Volodymyr Uzhylovskyi	0–6, 1–6
Win	6–5	Jul 2017	Turkey F25, Istanbul	Futures	Clay	(Serbia) Miki Janković	(Serbia) Nikola Ćaćić (Bulgaria) Vasko Mladenov	6–4, 2–6, [11–9]

== National participation ==
=== Davis Cup (26 wins, 13 losses) ===
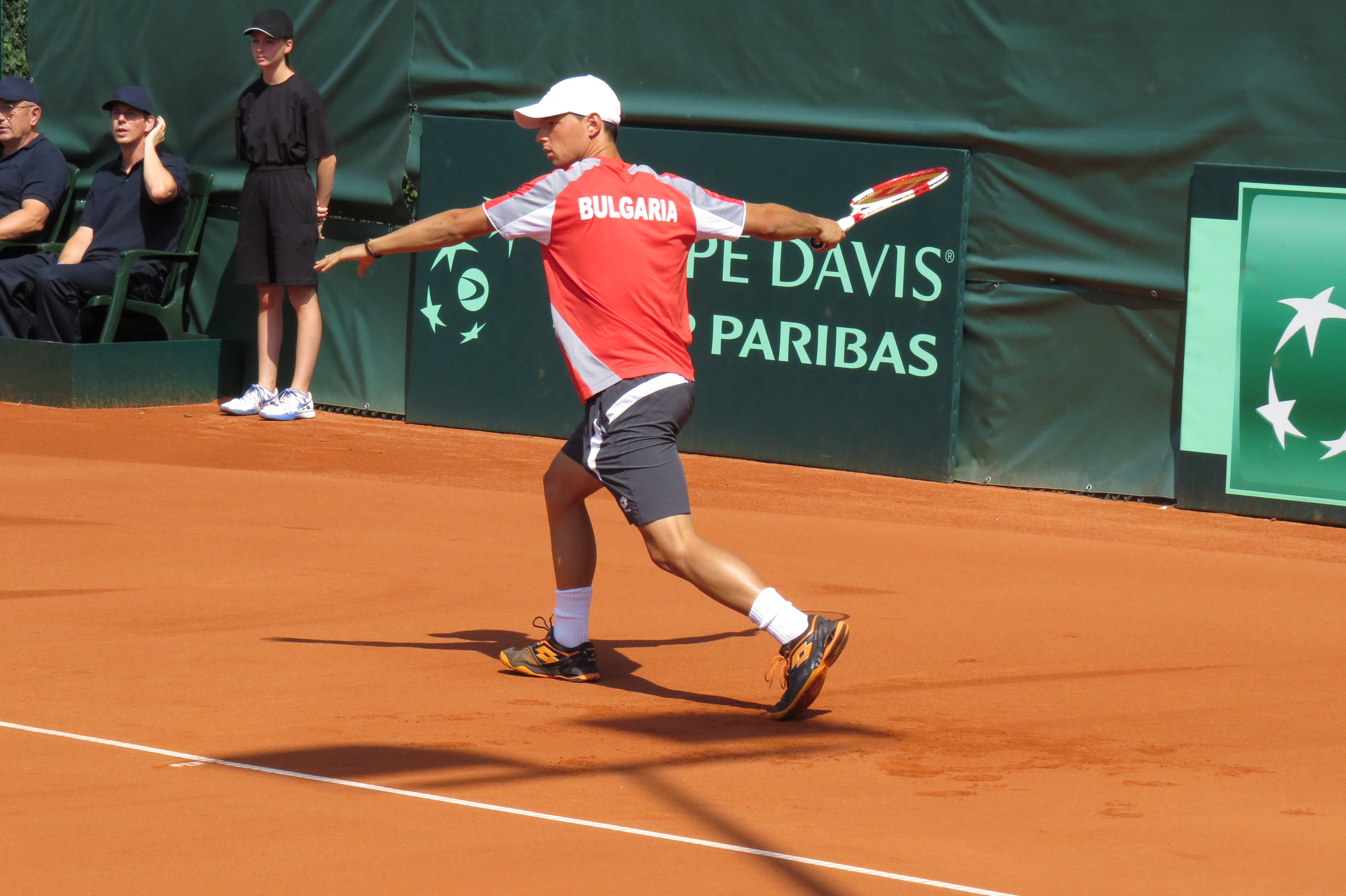
D. KUZMANOV at Davis Cup Event – LUX vs BUL 17.07.2015

Dimitar Kuzmanov debuted for the Bulgaria Davis Cup team in 2011. Since then he has 20 nominations with 26 ties played, his singles W/L record is 24–9 and doubles W/L record is 2–4 (26–13 overall).

Group membership World Group (0–0) WG Play-off (0–0) Group I (2–3) Group II (12–8) Group III (12–2) Group IV (0–0)	Matches by surface Hard (13–9) Clay (13–4) Grass (0–0) Carpet (0–0)	Matches by type Singles (22–9) Doubles (2–4)

- ▲ ▼ indicates the result of the Davis Cup match followed by the score, date, place of event, the zonal classification and its phase, and the court surface.

Rubber result	No.	Rubber	Match type (partner if any)	Opponent nation	Opponent player(s)	Score
▼1–4; 4–6 March 2011; Republic Olympic Training Center for Tennis, Minsk, Belarus; Group II Europe/Africa First Round; Hard (i) surface
Defeat	1	III	Doubles (with Valentin Dimov)	Belarus	Uladzimir Ignatik / Max Mirnyi	2–6, 4–6, 4–6
Defeat	2	V	Singles	Belarus	Aliaksandr Bury	2–6, 3–6
▼2–3; 8–10 July 2011; Tennis Hall Sofia, Sofia, Bulgaria; Group II Europe/Africa Relegation Play-Off; Hard (i) surface
Victory	3	V	Singles	Cyprus	Christopher Koutrouzas	6–2, 6–1
▲3–0; 2 May 2012; Bulgarian National Tennis Centre "Carlsberg", Sofia, Bulgaria; Group III Europe Round Robin; Clay surface
Victory	4	I	Singles	Albania	Rei Pelushi	6–1, 6–0
▲3–0; 4 May 2012; Bulgarian National Tennis Centre "Carlsberg", Sofia, Bulgaria; Group III Europe Round Robin; Clay surface
Victory	5	I	Singles	(Georgia (country)) Georgia	Aleksandre Metreveli	6–3, 6–2
▲3–0; 5 May 2012; Bulgarian National Tennis Centre "Carlsberg", Sofia, Bulgaria; Group III Europe Promotional Play-Off; Clay surface
Victory	6	I	Singles	(North Macedonia) Macedonia	Shendrit Deari	1–6, 6–2, 7–5
▼2–3; 1–3 February 2013; Tennis Hall Sofia, Sofia, Bulgaria; Group II Europe/Africa First Round; Hard (i) surface
Defeat	7	III	Doubles (with Grigor Dimitrov)	Finland	Harri Heliövaara / Henri Kontinen	5–7, 1–6, 6–4, 6–2, 4–6
▲3–0; 5–7 April 2013; TC Lokomotiv Plovdiv, Plovdiv, Bulgaria; Group II Europe/Africa Relegation Play-Off; Clay surface
Victory	8	II	Singles	Estonia	Markus Kerner	6–2, 6–1, 6–2
▲4–1; 6–8 March 2015; Tenisa Centrs Lielupe, Jūrmala, Latvia; Group II Europe/Africa First Round; Hard (i) surface
Victory	9	II	Singles	Latvia	Jānis Podžus	6–4, 3–6, 6–3, 1–6, 12–10
Victory	10	IV	Singles	Latvia	Mārtiņš Podžus	7–6^{(8–6)}, 5–7, 6–2, 6–4
▲5–0; 17–19 July 2015; Tennis Club Howald, Luxembourg City, Luxembourg; Group II Europe/Africa Quarterfinal; Clay surface
Victory	11	I	Singles	Luxembourg	Ugo Nastasi	6–3, 6–3, 6–1
▼2–3; 18–20 September 2015; Bulgarian National Tennis Center, Sofia, Bulgaria; Group II Europe/Africa Semifinal; Clay surface
Defeat	12	II	Singles	Hungary	Márton Fucsovics	3–6, 1–6, 1–6
Victory	13	V	Singles	Hungary	Gábor Borsos	6–2, 6–7^{(2–7)}, 6–2
▼2–3; 4–6 March 2016; Ankara Tenis Kulübü, Ankara, Turkey; Group II Europe/Africa First Round; Hard (i) surface
Defeat	14	I	Singles	Turkey	Cem İlkel	6–7^{(4–7)}, 6–1, 4–6, 6–1, 5–7
Defeat	15	IV	Singles	Turkey	Marsel İlhan	6–4, 2–6, 4–6, 6–4, 0–6
▲3–0; 6 April 2017; Holiday Village Santa Marina, Sozopol, Bulgaria; Group III Europe Round Robin; Hard surface
Victory	16	I	Singles	Armenia	Mikayel Khachatryan	6–3, 7–6^{(7–0)}
▲3–0; 7 April 2017; Holiday Village Santa Marina, Sozopol, Bulgaria; Group III Europe Round Robin; Hard surface
Victory	17	I	Singles	Greece	Charalampos Kapogiannis	6–7^{(6–8)}, 6–2, 6–4
▼1–2; 8 April 2017; Holiday Village Santa Marina, Sozopol, Bulgaria; Group III Europe Promotional Play-Off; Hard surface
Victory	18	I	Singles	(Republic of Ireland) Ireland	Sam Barry	4–6, 6–3, 7–6^{(8–6)}
Defeat	19	III	Doubles (with Alexandar Lazov)	(Republic of Ireland) Ireland	Sam Barry / David O'Hare	1–6, 6–7^{(6–8)}
▲3–0; 4 April 2018; Tennis Club Lokomotiv, Plovdiv, Bulgaria; Group III Europe Round Robin; Clay surface
Victory	20	II	Singles	Albania	Elbi Mjeshtri	6–0, 6–0
Victory	21	III	Doubles (with Vasko Mladenov)	Albania	Elbi Mjeshtri / Genajd Shypheja	6–0, 6–0
▲3–0; 5 April 2018; Tennis Club Lokomotiv, Plovdiv, Bulgaria; Group III Europe Round Robin; Clay surface
Victory	22	II	Singles	Iceland	Anton Magnússon	6–1, 6–1
Victory	23	III	Doubles (with Vasko Mladenov)	Iceland	Birkir Gunnarsson / Egill Sigurðsson	6–2, 6–1
▲3–0; 6 April 2018; Tennis Club Lokomotiv, Plovdiv, Bulgaria; Group III Europe Round Robin; Clay surface
Victory	24	II	Singles	(North Macedonia) Macedonia	Dimitar Grabul	6–2, 6–2
▼1–2; 7 April 2018; Tennis Club Lokomotiv, Plovdiv, Bulgaria; Group III Europe Promotional Play-Off; Clay surface
Victory	25	II	Singles	Monaco	Lucas Catarina	6–2, 6–1
Defeat	26	III	Doubles (with Vasko Mladenov)	Monaco	Romain Arneodo / Benjamin Balleret	4–6, 3–6
▼1–4; 13–14 September 2019; Kelvin Grove Club, Cape Town, South Africa; Group II Europe/Africa First Round; Hard surface
Victory	27	II	Singles	South Africa	Ruan Roelofse	7–5, 7–5
Defeat	28	IV	Singles	South Africa	Lloyd Harris	3–6, 6–7^{(3–7)}
▲4–1; 6–7 March 2020; Costa Rica Country Club, San José, Costa Rica; World Group II Play-Off; Hard surface
Victory	29	I	Singles	Costa Rica	Julián Saborío	6–4, 6–2
Victory	30	IV	Singles	Costa Rica	Jesse Flores	6–4, 6–3
▼1–3; 5–6 March 2021; Sport Hall Sofia, Sofia, Bulgaria; World Group II; Hard (i) surface
Victory	31	I	Singles	Mexico	Luis Patiño	6–1, 6–1
Defeat	32	IV	Singles	Mexico	Gerardo López Villaseñor	6–7^{(6–8)}, 6–4, 6–7^{(5–7)}
▲3–1; 4–5 March 2022; Sport Hall Sofia, Sofia, Bulgaria; World Group II Play-Off; Hard (i) surface
Victory	33	I	Singles	Paraguay	Hernando José Escurra Isnardi	7–6^{(7–5)}, 6–0
▲3–0; 16–18 September 2022; Bulgarian National Tennis Center, Sofia, Bulgaria; World Group II; Clay surface
Victory	34	I	Singles	South Africa	Lleyton Cronje	6–3, 6–1
▲3–1; 4–5 February 2023; Wilding Park, Christchurch, New Zealand; World Group I Play-Off; Hard surface
Victory	35	II	Singles	New Zealand	Kiranpal Pannu	5–7, 6–3, 6–2
Victory	36	IV	Singles	New Zealand	Ajeet Rai	6–3, 5–7, 6–4
▼1–3; 16–17 September 2023; Bulgarian National Tennis Center, Sofia, Bulgaria; World Group I; Clay surface
Defeat	37	I	Singles	Kazakhstan	Timofey Skatov	6–3, 4–6, 3–6
Defeat	38	IV	Singles	Kazakhstan	Alexander Bublik	4–6, 6–7^{(4–7)}
▼1–3; 3–4 February 2024; Tennis Center Avenue, Burgas, Bulgaria; World Group I Play-Off; Hard (i) surface
Defeat	39	I	Singles	Bosnia and Herzegovina	Nerman Fatić	6–3, 3–6, 4–6

=== ATP Cup (2 wins, 1 loss) ===
Matches by type
Singles (2–1)
Doubles (0–0)

Result	No.	Rubber	Match type (partner if any)	Opponent nation	Opponent player(s)	Score
▲2–1; 3 January 2020; Ken Rosewall Arena, Sydney, Australia; Group stage; Hard surface
Defeat	1	I	Singles	(United Kingdom) Great Britain	Cameron Norrie	2–6, 6–3, 2–6
▲2–1; 5 January 2020; Ken Rosewall Arena, Sydney, Australia; Group stage; Hard surface
Victory	2	I	Singles	Moldova	Alexander Cozbinov	6–1, 7–5
▼1–2; 7 January 2020; Ken Rosewall Arena, Sydney, Australia; Group stage; Hard surface
Victory	3	I	Singles	Belgium	Steve Darcis	6–0, 6–3

=== United Cup (2 wins, 0 losses) ===
Matches by type
Singles (2–0)
Doubles (0–0)

Result	No.	Rubber	Match type (partner if any)	Opponent nation	Opponent player(s)	Score
▼1–4; 29–30 December 2022; Perth Arena, Perth, Australia; Group stage; Hard surface
Victory	1	IV	Singles	Greece	Michail Pervolarakis	6–1, 6–1
▲3–2; 31 December 2022 - 1 January 2023; Perth Arena, Perth, Australia; Group stage; Hard surface
Victory	2	IV	Singles	Belgium	Zizou Bergs	6–2, 6–0

== Individual awards ==
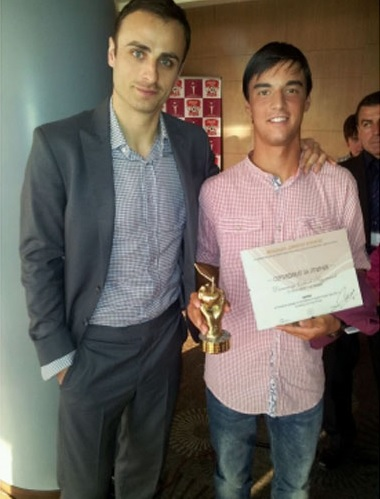
D. Kuzmanov awarded by D. Berbatov Foundation

- „Young sport talent of Plovdiv for 2006" by Plovdiv Municipality
- „Tennis Player of the Year 2009 of Europe for Boys U16“ – Tennis Europe Junior Tour powered by Polar
- „Best sportsman for 2009“ by PSS Lokomotiv Plovdiv
- „The Best Progressing Young Tennis Player of the Year 2009“ by Bulgarian Tennis Federation
- „Sportsman №8 of Best 10 sportsmen of Plovdiv for 2009“ by Plovdiv Municipality
- „Young tennis talent for 2010" by Bulgarian Tennis Federation
- „Best young tennis player of Bulgaria for 2011" by Bulgarian Tennis Federation
- „Young talent of Bulgaria for 2011 – Sport category" by "Dimitar Berbatov" Foundation
- „Sportsman №3 of Best 10 young sportsmen of Bulgaria for 2011" by ViaSport
- „Sportsman №8 of Best 10 sportsmen of Plovdiv Municipality for 2011" by Plovdiv Municipality
- „Sportsman №8 of Best 10 sportsmen of Plovdiv Municipality for 2013" by Plovdiv Municipality
- „Sportsman №9 of Best 10 sportsmen of Plovdiv Municipality for 2017" by Plovdiv Municipality
- „Sportsman №4 of Best 10 sportsmen of Plovdiv Municipality for 2018" by Plovdiv Municipality
