= Bernabé Zapata Miralles =

Spanish tennis player (born 1997)

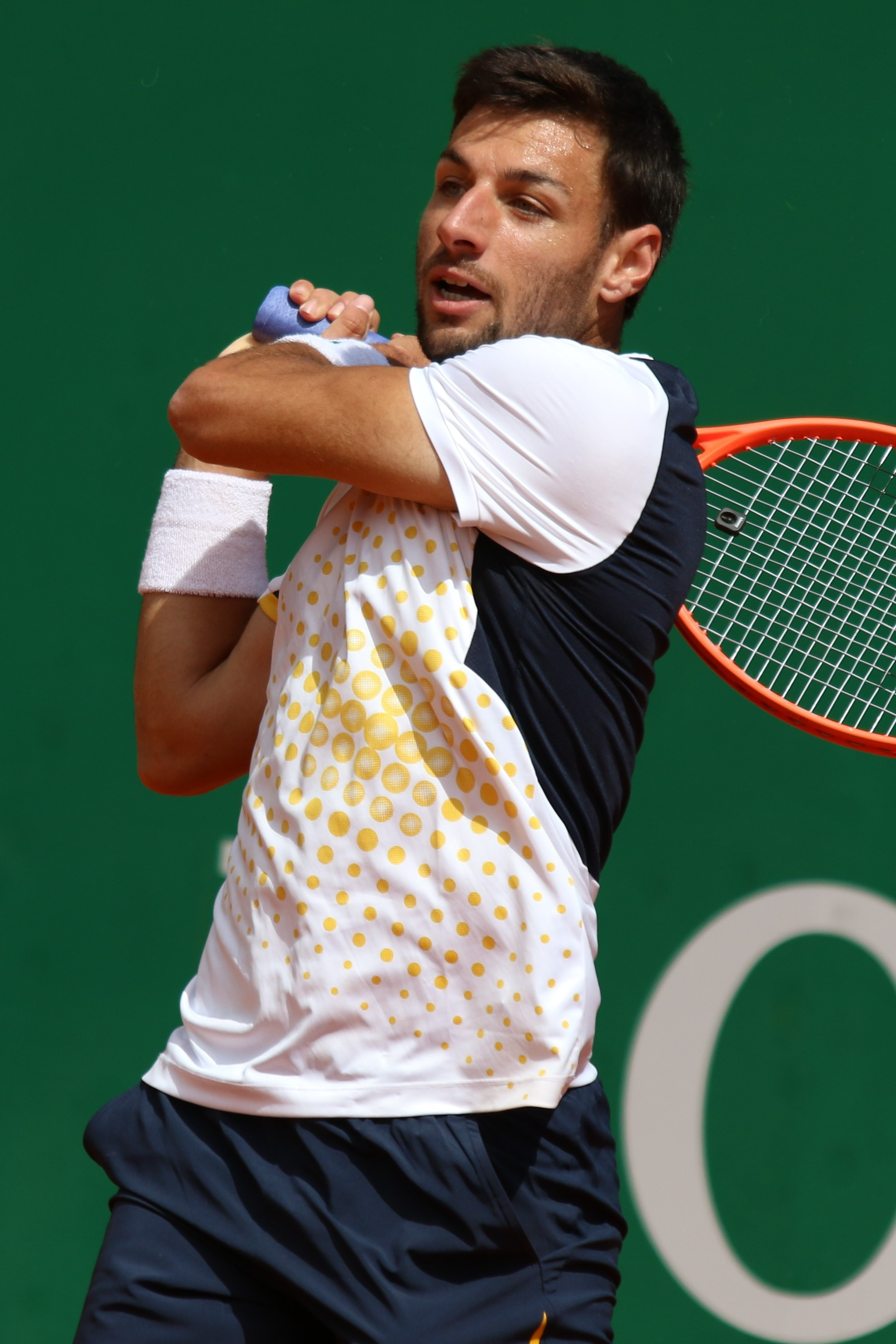
- Zapata Miralles at the 2022 Monte-Carlo Masters
- Country (sports): Spain
- Residence: Valencia, Spain
- Born: 12 January 1997 (age 29) Valencia, Spain
- Height: 1.83 m (6 ft 0 in)
- Turned pro: 2015
- Retired: 2026
- Plays: Right-handed (two-handed backhand)
- Prize money: US $2,651,849

Singles
- Career record: 35–62
- Career titles: 0
- Highest ranking: No. 37 (22 May 2023)

Grand Slam singles results
- Australian Open: 1R (2023, 2024)
- French Open: 4R (2022)
- Wimbledon: 1R (2021, 2022, 2023)
- US Open: 2R (2021, 2023)

Doubles
- Career record: 2–27
- Career titles: 0
- Highest ranking: No. 404 (21 August 2023)

Grand Slam doubles results
- Australian Open: 1R (2023)
- French Open: 1R (2023)
- US Open: 1R (2022, 2023)

Bernabé Zapata Miralles (born 12 January 1997) is a Spanish former professional tennis player. He has a career-high ATP singles ranking of world No. 37 achieved on 22 May 2023 and a career-high doubles ranking of world No. 404 achieved on 21 August 2023.

== Professional career ==
=== 2018: ATP debut ===
Zapata Miralles made his ATP main draw debut at the 2018 Geneva Open after qualifying for the singles main draw and he had his first main draw win by defeating Florian Mayer in straight sets.

=== 2020–21: Maiden Challenger title, Top 125 & Major debut & first win ===
He won his maiden title at the 2020 Internazionali di Tennis del Friuli Venezia Giulia in Cordenons, Italy defeating Carlos Alcaraz.

He had his second ATP main draw win when he beat John Millman in the first round of 2021 Dubai Tennis Championships in straight sets.

On his Grand Slam debut he qualified for his first at the 2021 French Open, and then for his second Major at the 2021 Wimbledon Championships.

Zapata Miralles was the champion in the Challengers in Heilbronn and Poznań claiming his first and second ATP Challenger titles of 2021. As a result, he achieved a new career high ranking of world No. 110 on 2 August 2021.

He subsequently qualified for his third Major in a row at the 2021 US Open as lucky loser. He reached the second round for the first time in his career defeating fellow Spaniard Feliciano López.

=== 2022: French Open fourth round & first top-15 win, top 75 debut ===
Ranked No. 130 at the 2022 French Open, Zapata Miralles qualified to make his second consecutive Grand Slam main draw at this Major. He won his first match at this Major defeating wildcard Michael Mmoh. In the second round he recorded a career breakthrough, upsetting World No. 14 and 13th seed Taylor Fritz for his maiden third-round showing at a Grand Slam and first top-15 win. He went one step further to reach the fourth round, having never past the second round of a Major before, defeating John Isner in a five set 3 1/2 hours match. He was the first Spanish qualifier to reach the fourth round of a Grand Slam since recording started in 1983. As a result, he secured a top 100 debut at world No. 97 on 6 June 2022 and two weeks later he reached No. 90. Following his title at the 2022 Meerbusch Challenger he reached a career-high ranking of No. 74 on 15 August 2022.

=== 2023: Two ATP semifinals in Latin America, Masters fourth round, top 50 ===
At the ATP 250 2023 Córdoba Open he broke the record for the longest match ever in the tournament history when he defeated compatriot Roberto Carballés Baena in three hours and 26 minutes in the first round. The previous-longest match was in 2020, when Albert Ramos Viñolas outlasted Pablo Andújar in three hours and 20 minutes. At the next ATP 250 2023 Argentina Open he reached the semifinals for the first time in his career defeating two seeds, fourth seed, home favorite, Argentine Diego Schwartzman in the second round and fifth seed, another Argentine Francisco Cerúndolo in the quarterfinals but lost to top seed compatriot and eventual champion Carlos Alcaraz. As a result, he reached a new career high ranking of world No. 63 on 20 February 2023. He reached back to back semifinals in the Latin American Golden Swing at the ATP 500 2023 Rio Open defeating two seeds again, fourth seed Francisco Cerúndolo again and seventh seed Albert Ramos Viñolas. He lost to second seed and eventual champion Cameron Norrie. As a result, he moved another 20 positions in the top 45 at world No. 42 on 27 February 2023.

At the 2023 Mutua Madrid Open he reached the third round of a Masters for the first time defeating Mackenzie McDonald and upset 19th seed Dan Evans. He then defeated another qualifier Roman Safiullin to reach the fourth round on his debut at this tournament. He lost to fourth seed Stefanos Tsitsipas. Following this result, he reached a new career high ranking in the top 40 at world No. 37 on 22 May 2023. Seeded 32nd for the first time at a Grand Slam at the 2023 French Open, he lost in the first round to Diego Schwartzman in five sets.

He lost also in the first round at the 2023 Wimbledon Championships to Tomás Martín Etcheverry after being two sets to love up in a 4 and 1/2 hours match over two days after play was suspended due to darkness.

At the 2023 US Open he lost to eventual champion Novak Djokovic in straight sets, having defeated wildcard Ethan Quinn in straight sets in the first.

=== 2024–26: 300 positions ranking drop, retirement ===
As a result of a couple of first round losses in the beginning of the season, his singles ranking fell outside the top 100 after the 2024 Rio Open. He fell as low as No. 143 on 26 February 2024, more than 100 positions from his career high ranking, for not being able to defend his semifinal points. He further dropped out of the top 200 on 20 May 2024 and of the top 250 on 9 September 2024.

Zapata Miralles announced his retirement from professional tennis in December 2025, citing mental health issues. His final tournament was Copa Faulconbridge in May 2026.

== Performance timelines ==
Key
W	F	SF	QF	#R	RR	Q#	DNQ	A	NH

(W) winner; (F) finalist; (SF) semifinalist; (QF) quarterfinalist; (#R) rounds 4, 3, 2, 1; (RR) round-robin stage; (Q#) qualification round; (DNQ) did not qualify; (A) absent; (NH) not held; (SR) strike rate (events won / competed); (W–L) win–loss record.
To avoid confusion and double counting, these charts are updated at the conclusion of a tournament or when the player's participation has ended.

=== Singles ===
Current through the 2024 Miami Open.

Tournament	2018	2019	2020	2021	2022	2023	2024	SR	W–L	Win %
Grand Slam tournaments
Australian Open	A	A	Q1	Q1	Q1	1R	1R	0 / 2	0–2	0%
French Open	A	A	A	1R	4R	1R	Q2	0 / 3	3–3	50%
Wimbledon	A	A	NH	1R	1R	1R	Q2	0 / 3	0–3	0%
US Open	A	Q1	A	2R	1R	2R	A	0 / 3	2–3	40%
Win–loss	0–0	0–0	0–0	1–3	3–3	1–4	0–1	0 / 11	5–11	31%
ATP Masters 1000
Indian Wells Masters	A	A	NH	A	A	1R	1R	0 / 2	0–2	0%
Miami Open	A	A	NH	Q1	A	1R	A	0 / 1	0–1	0%
Monte-Carlo Masters	A	A	NH	Q1	1R	1R	A	0 / 2	0–2	0%
Madrid Open	A	A	NH	Q1	A	4R	Q1	0 / 1	3–1	75%
Italian Open	A	A	Q1	A	A	3R	Q1	0 / 1	1–1	50%
Canadian Open	A	A	NH	A	A	1R	A	0 / 1	0–1	0%
Cincinnati Open	A	A	A	A	A	A	A	0 / 0	0–0	–
Shanghai Masters	A	A	NH			1R	A	0 / 1	0–1	0%
Paris Masters	A	A	Q1	A	Q2	Q1	A	0 / 0	0–0	–
Win–loss	0–0	0–0	0–0	0–0	0–1	4–7	0–1	0 / 9	4–9	31%
Career statistics
Tournaments	1	2	0	10	16	24	8	Career total: 61		
Overall win–loss	1–1	0–2	0–0	5–10	10–16	18–25	1–8	0 / 61	35–62	36%
Year-end ranking	266	200	150	124	74	80	271	$2,651,849		

== ATP Challenger and ITF Tour finals ==
=== Singles: 20 (12 titles, 8 runner-ups) ===
Legend (singles) ATP Challenger Tour (4–6) Futures/ITF World Tennis Tour (8–2)	Finals by surface Hard (1–2) Clay (11–6)

Result	W–L	Date	Tournament	Tier	Surface	Opponent	Score
Win	1–0	Jul 2015	Spain F21, Gandia	Futures	Clay	(Spain) Albert Alcaraz Ivorra	1–6, 7–5, 7–6^{7–2}
Win	2–0	Nov 2015	Tunisia F30, El Kantaoui	Futures	Hard	(Tunisia) Anis Ghorbel	6–4, 6–4
Win	3–0	Apr 2016	Spain F10, Majadahonda	Futures	Clay	(Chile) Bastian Malla	6–7^{4–7}, 7–6^{8–6}, 4–0 ret
Win	4–0	Aug 2016	Spain F26, Vigo	Futures	Clay	(Italy) Alberto Brizzi	6–3, 6–3
Win	5–0	Sep 2016	Spain F30, Madrid	Futures	Clay (i)	(Argentina) Gonzalo Villanueva	6–2, 6–1
Loss	5–1	Mar 2017	Spain F7, Jávea	Futures	Clay	(Argentina) Pedro Cachin	3–6, 3–6
Win	6–1	Jun 2017	Germany F4, Kaltenkirchen	Futures	Clay	(Slovenia) Nik Razboršek	6–4, 7–5
Win	7–1	Jul 2017	Spain F20, Getxo	Futures	Clay	(Spain) Carlos Taberner	6–3, 3–6, 6–3
Win	8–1	Jul 2017	Spain F21, Gandia	Futures	Clay	(Spain) Sergio Gutiérrez Ferrol	6–3, 5–7, 7–5
Loss	8–2	Nov 2017	Morocco F5, Beni Mellal	Futures	Clay	(Lithuania) Laurynas Grigelis	1–6, 2–6
Loss	8–3	Oct 2019	Hamburg, Germany	Challenger	Hard (i)	(Netherlands) Botic Van De Zandschulp	3–6, 7–5, 1–6
Loss	8–4	Aug 2020	Todi, Italy	Challenger	Clay	(Germany) Yannick Hanfmann	3–6, 3–6
Win	9–4	Sep 2020	Cordenons, Italy	Challenger	Clay	(Spain) Carlos Alcaraz	6–2, 4–6, 6–2
Loss	9–5	Feb 2021	Quimper, France	Challenger	Hard (i)	(United States) Brandon Nakashima	3–6, 4–6
Win	10–5	May 2021	Heilbronn, Germany	Challenger	Clay	(Colombia) Daniel Elahi Galán	6–3, 6–4
Win	11–5	Aug 2021	Poznań, Poland	Challenger	Clay	(Czech Republic) Jiří Lehečka	6–3, 6–2
Win	12–5	Aug 2022	Meerbusch, Germany	Challenger	Clay	(Austria) Dennis Novak	6–1, 6–2
Loss	12–6	Sep 2022	Seville, Spain	Challenger	Clay	(Spain) Roberto Carballés Baena	3–6, 6–7^{(6–8)}
Loss	12–7	Jul 2023	Iași, Romania	Challenger	Clay	(France) Hugo Gaston	6–3, 0–6, 4–6
Loss	12–8	Apr 2024	Barcelona, Spain	Challenger	Clay	(Dominican Republic) Nick Hardt	4–6, 6–3, 2–6

=== Doubles: 3 (1 title, 2 runner-ups) ===
Legend (doubles) ATP Challenger Tour (0–0) Futures/ITF World Tennis Tour (1–2)	Finals by surface Hard (0–1) Clay (1–1)

Result	W–L	Date	Tournament	Tier	Surface	Partner	Opponents	Score
Loss	0–1	Mar 2015	Egypt F8, Sharm El Sheikh	Futures	Clay	(France) Louis Tessa	(United Kingdom) Scott Clayton (United Kingdom) Richard Gabb	2–6, 4–6
Win	1–1	Sep 2015	Spain F31, Sabadell	Futures	Clay	(Norway) Viktor Durasovic	(Spain) Juan Samuel Arauzo Martinez (Germany) Jean-Marc Werner	6–4, 6–1
Loss	1–2	Nov 2015	Tunisia F30, El Kantaoui	Futures	Hard	(Spain) Samuel Ribeiro Navarrete	(Portugal) Felipe Cunha Silva (Portugal) João Domingues	6–7^{4–7}, 1–6

== Record against top 10 players ==
Zapata Miralles' record against players who have been ranked in the top 10, with those who are active in boldface. Only ATP Tour main draw matches are considered:

Player	Record	Win %	Hard	Clay	Grass	Last match
Number 1 ranked players						
(Serbia) **Novak Djokovic**	0–1	0%	0–1	–	–	Lost (4–6, 1–6, 1–6) at 2023 US Open
(Russia) **Daniil Medvedev**	0–1	0%	–	0–1	–	Lost (6–3, 1–6, 3–6) at 2023 Rome
(Spain) **Carlos Alcaraz**	0–2	0%	–	0–2	–	Lost (2–6, 2–6) at 2023 Buenos Aires
Number 2 ranked players						
(Germany) **Alexander Zverev**	0–1	0%	–	0–1	–	Lost (6–7^{(11–13)}, 5–7, 3–6) at 2022 French Open
Number 3 ranked players						
(Greece) **Stefanos Tsitsipas**	0–1	0%	–	0–1	–	Lost (3–6, 1–6) at 2023 Madrid
(Switzerland) **Stan Wawrinka**	0–1	0%	0–1	–	–	Lost (0–6, 2–6) at 2023 Metz
Number 4 ranked players						
(United States) **Taylor Fritz**	1–1	50%	–	1–0	0–1	Lost (4–6, 5–7) at 2023 Queen's Club
(Denmark) **Holger Rune**	1–1	50%	0–1	1–0	–	Won (3–6, 6–3, 6–2) at 2022 Umag
Number 5 ranked players						
(Spain) Tommy Robredo	1–0	100%	–	1–0	–	Won (6–1, 6–1) at 2022 Barcelona
(Canada) **Félix Auger-Aliassime**	0–1	0%	0–1	–	–	Lost (6–7^{(5–7)}, 3–6, 2–6) at 2021 US Open
(Russia) **Andrey Rublev**	0–1	0%	–	0–1	–	Lost (7–5, 1–6, 6–7^{(7–9)}) at 2023 Hamburg
Number 6 ranked players						
(Poland) **Hubert Hurkacz**	1–0	100%	–	1–0	–	Won (6–7^{(7–9)}, 6–4, 6–2) at 2023 Estoril
(Australia) **Alex de Minaur**	0–1	0%	–	0–1	–	Lost (3–6, 4–6) at 2022 Monte-Carlo
Number 8 ranked players						
(United States) John Isner	1–0	100%	–	1–0	–	Won (6–4, 3–6, 6–4, 6–7^{(5–7)}, 6–3) at 2022 French Open
(Argentina) Diego Schwartzman	1–1	50%	–	1–1	–	Lost (6–1, 7–6^{(7–5)}, 2–6, 0–6, 4–6) at 2023 French Open
(Russia) **Karen Khachanov**	0–1	0%	0–1	–	–	Lost (6–7^{(3–7)}, 2–6, 0–6) at 2023 Australian Open
(United Kingdom) **Cameron Norrie**	0–1	0%	–	0–1	–	Lost (2–6, 6–3, 6–7^{(3–7)}) at 2023 Rio
(United States) Jack Sock	0–1	0%	–	–	0–1	Lost (6–7^{(6–8)}, 4–6, 4–6) at 2022 Wimbledon
Number 9 ranked players						
(Italy) Fabio Fognini	1–1	50%	0–1	1–0	–	Lost (6–4, 2–6, 3–6) at 2024 Indian Wells
(Spain) **Roberto Bautista Agut**	0–1	0%	–	0–1	–	Lost (2–6, 2–6) at 2023 Barcelona
Number 10 ranked players						
(United States) **Frances Tiafoe**	0–1	0%	0–1	–	–	Lost (1–6, 6–7^{(7–9)}) at 2022 Tokyo
(Spain) **Pablo Carreño Busta**	0–2	0%	–	0–2	–	Lost (3–6, 3–6) at 2022 Barcelona
**Total**	**7–21**	**25%**	**0–7** **(0%)**	**7–12** **(37%)**	**0–2** **(0%)**	*** Statistics correct as of 7 February 2024**

== Personal life ==
Zapata is Catholic and a member of the Neocatechumenal Way. He married Miriam Pérez Muñoz in 2021.
