= Sánchez-Casal Cup =

- 2024 Sánchez-Casal Cup

Defunct tennis tournament
- Event name: Sánchez-Casal Cup
- Location: Barcelona, Spain
- Venue: Emilio Sánchez Academy
- Category: ATP Challenger Tour
- Surface: Clay
- Draw: 32S/32Q/16D

The Sánchez-Casal Cup was a professional tennis tournament played on clay courts. It was part of the ATP Challenger Tour. It was held annually in Barcelona, Spain from 2018 until 2021 and in 2024.

== Past finals ==
=== Singles ===
Year	Champion	Runner-up	Score	Ref.
2024	(Dominican Republic) Nick Hardt	(Spain) Bernabé Zapata Miralles	6–4, 3–6, 6–2	
2022–23	Not held			
2021	(Bulgaria) Dimitar Kuzmanov	(France) Hugo Gaston	6–3, 6–0	
2020	(Spain) Carlos Alcaraz	(Bosnia and Herzegovina) Damir Džumhur	4–6, 6–2, 6–1	
2019	(Italy) Salvatore Caruso	(Slovakia) Jozef Kovalík	6–4, 6–2	
2018	(Spain) Roberto Carballés Baena	(Spain) Pedro Martínez	1–6, 6–3, 6–0	

=== Doubles ===
Year	Champions	Runners-up	Score
2024	(Spain) Daniel Rincón (Spain) Oriol Roca Batalla	(Germany) Jakob Schnaitter (Germany) Mark Wallner	5–7, 6–4, [11–9]
2022–23	Not held		
2021	(Finland) Harri Heliövaara (Czech Republic) Roman Jebavý	(Portugal) Nuno Borges (Portugal) Francisco Cabral	6–4, 6–3
2020	(Poland) Szymon Walków (Austria) Tristan-Samuel Weissborn	(Finland) Harri Heliövaara (United States) Alex Lawson	6–1, 4–6, [10–8]
2019	(Italy) Simone Bolelli (Spain) David Vega Hernández	(Spain) Sergio Martos Gornés (India) Ramkumar Ramanathan	6–4, 7–5
2018	(Brazil) Marcelo Demoliner (Spain) David Vega Hernández	(Australia) Rameez Junaid (Netherlands) David Pel	7–6^{(7–3)}, 6–3
