= 2020 ATP Challenger Tour =

Details
- Duration: 6 January 2020 – 6 December 2020
- Edition: 43rd (12th under this name)
- Tournaments: 57
- Categories: Challenger 125 (10); Challenger 110 (0); Challenger 100 (10); Challenger 90 (2); Challenger 80 (35); Challenger 50 (0)

Achievements (singles)
- Most titles: (Spain) Carlos Alcaraz (Argentina) Francisco Cerúndolo (3)
- Most finals: (Spain) Carlos Alcaraz (Russia) Aslan Karatsev (4)

The ATP Challenger Tour in 2020 was the secondary professional tennis circuit organized by the ATP. The 2020 ATP Challenger Tour calendar comprised 57 tournaments with prize money ranging from $35,000 up to $162,480. It was the 43rd edition of challenger tournaments cycle and 12th under the name of Challenger Tour.

The Challenger Tour was suspended between 13 March and 16 August due to the COVID-19 pandemic.

== Schedule ==
This was the complete schedule of events on the 2020 calendar, with player progression documented from the quarterfinals stage.

=== January ===
| Week of | Tournament | Champions | Runners-up | Semifinalists | Quarterfinalists |
|---|---|---|---|---|---|
| January 6 | Canberra Challenger; Bendigo, Australia; Challenger 125 – hard – 48S/4Q/16D; Singles – Doubles | (Germany) Philipp Kohlschreiber; 7–6^{(7–5)}, 4–6, 6–3 | (Finland) Emil Ruusuvuori | (United States) Denis Kudla (Russia) Evgeny Donskoy | (Spain) Jaume Munar (Germany) Dominik Koepfer (United States) Steve Johnson (South Korea) Kwon Soon-woo |
| January 6 | Canberra Challenger; Bendigo, Australia; Challenger 125 – hard – 48S/4Q/16D; Singles – Doubles | (Australia) Max Purcell (Australia) Luke Saville; 7–6^{(7–3)}, 7–6^{(7–3)} | (Israel) Jonathan Erlich (Belarus) Andrei Vasilevski | (United States) Denis Kudla (Russia) Evgeny Donskoy | (Spain) Jaume Munar (Germany) Dominik Koepfer (United States) Steve Johnson (South Korea) Kwon Soon-woo |
| January 6 | BNP Paribas de Nouvelle-Calédonie; Nouméa, New Caledonia; Challenger 90 – hard – 48S/4Q/16D; Singles – Doubles | (United States) J. J. Wolf; 6–2, 6–2 | (Japan) Yūichi Sugita | (Germany) Cedrik-Marcel Stebe (Italy) Matteo Viola | (France) Tristan Lamasine (Slovakia) Martin Kližan (Italy) Roberto Marcora (Slovenia) Blaž Kavčič |
| January 6 | BNP Paribas de Nouvelle-Calédonie; Nouméa, New Caledonia; Challenger 90 – hard – 48S/4Q/16D; Singles – Doubles | (Italy) Andrea Pellegrino (Spain) Mario Vilella Martínez; 7–6^{(7–1)}, 3–6, [12–10] | (Switzerland) Luca Margaroli (Italy) Andrea Vavassori | (Germany) Cedrik-Marcel Stebe (Italy) Matteo Viola | (France) Tristan Lamasine (Slovakia) Martin Kližan (Italy) Roberto Marcora (Slovenia) Blaž Kavčič |
| January 6 | Ann Arbor Challenger; Ann Arbor, United States; Challenger 80 – hard (i) – 48S/4Q/16D; Singles – Doubles | (United States) Ulises Blanch; 3–6, 6–4, 6–2 | (Dominican Republic) Roberto Cid Subervi | (United States) Stefan Kozlov (Germany) Daniel Altmaier | (United States) Bjorn Fratangelo (Ecuador) Roberto Quiroz (Israel) Edan Leshem (United States) JC Aragone |
| January 6 | Ann Arbor Challenger; Ann Arbor, United States; Challenger 80 – hard (i) – 48S/4Q/16D; Singles – Doubles | (United States) Robert Galloway (Mexico) Hans Hach Verdugo; 4–6, 6–4, [10–8] | (Colombia) Nicolás Barrientos (Colombia) Alejandro Gómez | (United States) Stefan Kozlov (Germany) Daniel Altmaier | (United States) Bjorn Fratangelo (Ecuador) Roberto Quiroz (Israel) Edan Leshem (United States) JC Aragone |
| January 13 | Bangkok Challenger; Bangkok, Thailand; Challenger 80 – hard – 48S/4Q/16D; Singles – Doubles | (Hungary) Attila Balázs; 7–6^{(7–5)}, 0–6, 7–6^{(8–6)} | (Russia) Aslan Karatsev | (Italy) Gian Marco Moroni (Russia) Roman Safiullin | (China) Wu Di (Italy) Andrea Arnaboldi (Croatia) Borna Gojo (Russia) Evgeny Karlovskiy |
| January 13 | Bangkok Challenger; Bangkok, Thailand; Challenger 80 – hard – 48S/4Q/16D; Singles – Doubles | (Kazakhstan) Andrey Golubev (Kazakhstan) Aleksandr Nedovyesov; 3–6, 7–6^{(7–1)}, [10–5] | (Thailand) Sanchai Ratiwatana (Indonesia) Christopher Rungkat | (Italy) Gian Marco Moroni (Russia) Roman Safiullin | (China) Wu Di (Italy) Andrea Arnaboldi (Croatia) Borna Gojo (Russia) Evgeny Karlovskiy |
| January 13 | Bendigo Challenger; Bendigo, Australia; Challenger 80 – hard – 48S/4Q/16D; Singles – Doubles | (United States) Steve Johnson; 7–6^{(7–2)}, 7–6^{(7–3)} | (Italy) Stefano Travaglia | (Italy) Andrea Vavassori (United States) Marcos Giron | (Bosnia and Herzegovina) Damir Džumhur (France) Harold Mayot (Australia) Christopher O'Connell (Spain) Roberto Carballés Baena |
| January 13 | Bendigo Challenger; Bendigo, Australia; Challenger 80 – hard – 48S/4Q/16D; Singles – Doubles | (Serbia) Nikola Ćaćić (Ukraine) Denys Molchanov; 7–6^{(7–3)}, 6–4 | (El Salvador) Marcelo Arévalo (United Kingdom) Jonny O'Mara | (Italy) Andrea Vavassori (United States) Marcos Giron | (Bosnia and Herzegovina) Damir Džumhur (France) Harold Mayot (Australia) Christopher O'Connell (Spain) Roberto Carballés Baena |
| January 20 | Open de Rennes; Rennes, France; Challenger 80 – hard (i) – 48S/4Q/16D; Singles – Doubles | (France) Arthur Rinderknech; 7–5, 6–4 | (United Kingdom) James Ward | (Germany) Tobias Kamke (Serbia) Danilo Petrović | (Spain) Roberto Ortega Olmedo (Turkey) Cem İlkel (France) Constant Lestienne (France) Kyrian Jacquet |
| January 20 | Open de Rennes; Rennes, France; Challenger 80 – hard (i) – 48S/4Q/16D; Singles – Doubles | (Croatia) Antonio Šančić (Austria) Tristan-Samuel Weissborn; 7–5, 6–7^{(5–7)}, [10–7] | (Russia) Teymuraz Gabashvili (Slovakia) Lukáš Lacko | (Germany) Tobias Kamke (Serbia) Danilo Petrović | (Spain) Roberto Ortega Olmedo (Turkey) Cem İlkel (France) Constant Lestienne (France) Kyrian Jacquet |
| January 20 | Bangkok Challenger II; Bangkok, Thailand; Challenger 80 – hard – 48S/4Q/16D; Singles – Doubles | (Italy) Federico Gaio; 6–1, 4–6, 4–2 ret. | (Netherlands) Robin Haase | (Kazakhstan) Dmitry Popko (France) Hugo Grenier | (Czech Republic) Jiří Veselý (Germany) Daniel Altmaier (Russia) Roman Safiullin (India) Ramkumar Ramanathan |
| January 20 | Bangkok Challenger II; Bangkok, Thailand; Challenger 80 – hard – 48S/4Q/16D; Singles – Doubles | (Ecuador) Gonzalo Escobar (Mexico) Miguel Ángel Reyes-Varela; 6–3, 6–3 | (China) Gong Maoxin (China) Zhang Ze | (Kazakhstan) Dmitry Popko (France) Hugo Grenier | (Czech Republic) Jiří Veselý (Germany) Daniel Altmaier (Russia) Roman Safiullin (India) Ramkumar Ramanathan |
| January 27 | Oracle Challenger Series – Newport Beach; Newport Beach, United States; Challenger 125 – hard – 48S/4Q/16D; Singles – Doubles | (United States) Thai-Son Kwiatkowski; 6–4, 6–1 | (Colombia) Daniel Elahi Galán | (United States) Mitchell Krueger (United States) Steve Johnson | (United States) Raymond Sarmiento (United States) Christopher Eubanks (United States) Bradley Klahn (Uzbekistan) Denis Istomin |
| January 27 | Oracle Challenger Series – Newport Beach; Newport Beach, United States; Challenger 125 – hard – 48S/4Q/16D; Singles – Doubles | (Uruguay) Ariel Behar (Ecuador) Gonzalo Escobar; 6–2, 6–4 | (Croatia) Antonio Šančić (Austria) Tristan-Samuel Weissborn | (United States) Mitchell Krueger (United States) Steve Johnson | (United States) Raymond Sarmiento (United States) Christopher Eubanks (United States) Bradley Klahn (Uzbekistan) Denis Istomin |
| January 27 | Burnie International; Burnie, Australia; Challenger 80 – hard – 48S/4Q/16D; Singles – Doubles | (Japan) Taro Daniel; 6–2, 6–2 | (Germany) Yannick Hanfmann | (United Kingdom) Jay Clarke (Australia) Jason Kubler | (Egypt) Mohamed Safwat (Australia) Alex Bolt (China) Li Zhe (Greece) Michail Pervolarakis |
| January 27 | Burnie International; Burnie, Australia; Challenger 80 – hard – 48S/4Q/16D; Singles – Doubles | (Finland) Harri Heliövaara (Netherlands) Sem Verbeek; 7–6^{(7–5)}, 7–6^{(7–4)} | (Switzerland) Luca Margaroli (Italy) Andrea Vavassori | (United Kingdom) Jay Clarke (Australia) Jason Kubler | (Egypt) Mohamed Safwat (Australia) Alex Bolt (China) Li Zhe (Greece) Michail Pervolarakis |
| January 27 | Punta Open; Punta del Este, Uruguay; Challenger 80 – clay – 48S/4Q/16D; Singles – Doubles | (Brazil) Thiago Monteiro; 7–6^{(7–3)}, 6–7^{(6–8)}, 7–5 | (Italy) Marco Cecchinato | (Slovakia) Andrej Martin (Brazil) Felipe Meligeni Alves | (Italy) Alessandro Giannessi (Argentina) Facundo Bagnis (France) Geoffrey Blancaneaux (Brazil) Guilherme Clezar |
| January 27 | Punta Open; Punta del Este, Uruguay; Challenger 80 – clay – 48S/4Q/16D; Singles – Doubles | (Brazil) Orlando Luz (Brazil) Rafael Matos; 6–4, 6–2 | (Argentina) Juan Manuel Cerúndolo (Argentina) Thiago Agustín Tirante | (Slovakia) Andrej Martin (Brazil) Felipe Meligeni Alves | (Italy) Alessandro Giannessi (Argentina) Facundo Bagnis (France) Geoffrey Blancaneaux (Brazil) Guilherme Clezar |
| January 27 | Open Quimper Bretagne; Quimper, France; Challenger 80 – hard (i) – 48S/4Q/16D; Singles – Doubles | (Turkey) Cem İlkel; 7–6^{(8–6)}, 7–5 | (France) Maxime Janvier | (France) Mathias Bourgue (Slovakia) Lukáš Lacko | (Czech Republic) Zdeněk Kolář (Germany) Matthias Bachinger (Germany) Mischa Zverev (Czech Republic) Vít Kopřiva |
| January 27 | Open Quimper Bretagne; Quimper, France; Challenger 80 – hard (i) – 48S/4Q/16D; Singles – Doubles | (Kazakhstan) Andrey Golubev (Kazakhstan) Aleksandr Nedovyesov; 6–4, 6–2 | (Croatia) Ivan Sabanov (Croatia) Matej Sabanov | (France) Mathias Bourgue (Slovakia) Lukáš Lacko | (Czech Republic) Zdeněk Kolář (Germany) Matthias Bachinger (Germany) Mischa Zverev (Czech Republic) Vít Kopřiva |

=== February ===
| Week of | Tournament | Champions | Runners-up | Semifinalists | Quarterfinalists |
|---|---|---|---|---|---|
| February 3 | RBC Tennis Championships of Dallas; Dallas, United States; Challenger 100 – hard (i) – 48S/4Q/16D; Singles – Doubles | (Austria) Jurij Rodionov; 7–5, 7–6^{(12–10)} | (United States) Denis Kudla | (Ecuador) Emilio Gómez (Germany) Dominik Koepfer | (United States) Frances Tiafoe (United States) J. J. Wolf (United States) Mackenzie McDonald (Brazil) João Menezes |
| February 3 | RBC Tennis Championships of Dallas; Dallas, United States; Challenger 100 – hard (i) – 48S/4Q/16D; Singles – Doubles | (United States) Dennis Novikov (Portugal) Gonçalo Oliveira; 6–3, 6–4 | (Venezuela) Luis David Martínez (Mexico) Miguel Ángel Reyes-Varela | (Ecuador) Emilio Gómez (Germany) Dominik Koepfer | (United States) Frances Tiafoe (United States) J. J. Wolf (United States) Mackenzie McDonald (Brazil) João Menezes |
| February 3 | Launceston International; Launceston, Australia; Challenger 80 – hard – 48S/4Q/16D; Singles – Doubles | (Egypt) Mohamed Safwat; 7–6^{(7–5)}, 6–1 | (Australia) Alex Bolt | (Belgium) Kimmer Coppejans (Germany) Daniel Altmaier | (United Kingdom) Liam Broady (Italy) Lorenzo Giustino (Croatia) Borna Gojo (Italy) Liam Caruana |
| February 3 | Launceston International; Launceston, Australia; Challenger 80 – hard – 48S/4Q/16D; Singles – Doubles | (United States) Evan King (Zimbabwe) Benjamin Lock; 3–6, 6–3, [10–8] | (Belgium) Kimmer Coppejans (Spain) Sergio Martos Gornés | (Belgium) Kimmer Coppejans (Germany) Daniel Altmaier | (United Kingdom) Liam Broady (Italy) Lorenzo Giustino (Croatia) Borna Gojo (Italy) Liam Caruana |
| February 10 | Bengaluru Open; Bangalore, India; Challenger 125 – hard – 48S/4Q/16D; Singles – Doubles | (Australia) James Duckworth; 6–4, 6–4 | (France) Benjamin Bonzi | (Italy) Julian Ocleppo (Italy) Stefano Travaglia | (Belarus) Ilya Ivashka (Italy) Thomas Fabbiano (Japan) Yūichi Sugita (Slovenia) Blaž Rola |
| February 10 | Bengaluru Open; Bangalore, India; Challenger 125 – hard – 48S/4Q/16D; Singles – Doubles | (India) Purav Raja (India) Ramkumar Ramanathan; 6–0, 6–3 | (Australia) Matthew Ebden (India) Leander Paes | (Italy) Julian Ocleppo (Italy) Stefano Travaglia | (Belarus) Ilya Ivashka (Italy) Thomas Fabbiano (Japan) Yūichi Sugita (Slovenia) Blaž Rola |
| February 10 | Cleveland Open; Cleveland, United States; Challenger 80 – hard (i) – 48S/4Q/16D; Singles – Doubles | (Denmark) Mikael Torpegaard; 6–3, 1–6, 6–1 | (Japan) Yosuke Watanuki | (United States) Ernesto Escobedo (Brazil) Thomaz Bellucci | (United States) Denis Kudla (United States) Ulises Blanch (France) Geoffrey Blancaneaux (United States) Raymond Sarmiento |
| February 10 | Cleveland Open; Cleveland, United States; Challenger 80 – hard (i) – 48S/4Q/16D; Singles – Doubles | (Philippines) Treat Huey (United States) Nathaniel Lammons; 7–5, 6–2 | (Australia) Luke Saville (Australia) John-Patrick Smith | (United States) Ernesto Escobedo (Brazil) Thomaz Bellucci | (United States) Denis Kudla (United States) Ulises Blanch (France) Geoffrey Blancaneaux (United States) Raymond Sarmiento |
| February 10 | Challenger La Manche; Cherbourg, France; Challenger 80 – hard (i) – 48S/4Q/16D; Singles – Doubles | (Russia) Roman Safiullin; 6–4, 6–2 | (Italy) Roberto Marcora | (France) Antoine Hoang (Germany) Mischa Zverev | (Germany) Matthias Bachinger (France) Quentin Halys (Bosnia and Herzegovina) Mirza Bašić (Czech Republic) Zdeněk Kolář |
| February 10 | Challenger La Manche; Cherbourg, France; Challenger 80 – hard (i) – 48S/4Q/16D; Singles – Doubles | (Russia) Pavel Kotov (Russia) Roman Safiullin; 7–6^{(8–6)}, 5–7, [12–10] | (France) Dan Added (France) Albano Olivetti | (France) Antoine Hoang (Germany) Mischa Zverev | (Germany) Matthias Bachinger (France) Quentin Halys (Bosnia and Herzegovina) Mirza Bašić (Czech Republic) Zdeněk Kolář |
| February 17 | Trofeo Faip–Perrel; Bergamo, Italy; Challenger 80 – hard (i) – 48S/4Q/16D; Singles – Doubles | (Ukraine) Illya Marchenko vs (France) Enzo Couacaud; Cancelled due to the COVID-19 pandemic in Italy | | (France) Hugo Gaston (Chinese Taipei) Tseng Chun-hsin | (Turkey) Cem İlkel (France) Baptiste Crepatte (Italy) Andrea Arnaboldi (Italy) Roberto Marcora |
| February 17 | Trofeo Faip–Perrel; Bergamo, Italy; Challenger 80 – hard (i) – 48S/4Q/16D; Singles – Doubles | (Czech Republic) Zdeněk Kolář (Italy) Julian Ocleppo; 6–4, 6–3 | (Switzerland) Luca Margaroli (Italy) Andrea Vavassori | (France) Hugo Gaston (Chinese Taipei) Tseng Chun-hsin | (Turkey) Cem İlkel (France) Baptiste Crepatte (Italy) Andrea Arnaboldi (Italy) Roberto Marcora |
| February 17 | Challenger Banque Nationale de Drummondville; Drummondville, Canada; Challenger 80 – hard (i) – 48S/4Q/16D; Singles – Doubles | (United States) Maxime Cressy; 6–7^{(4–7)}, 6–4, 6–4 | (France) Arthur Rinderknech | (Australia) Christopher O'Connell (Germany) Johannes Härteis | (Japan) Yosuke Watanuki (United States) Sebastian Korda (Germany) Tobias Kamke (Dominican Republic) Roberto Cid Subervi |
| February 17 | Challenger Banque Nationale de Drummondville; Drummondville, Canada; Challenger 80 – hard (i) – 48S/4Q/16D; Singles – Doubles | (France) Manuel Guinard (France) Arthur Rinderknech; 7–6^{(7–4)}, 7–6^{(7–3)} | (Dominican Republic) Roberto Cid Subervi (Portugal) Gonçalo Oliveira | (Australia) Christopher O'Connell (Germany) Johannes Härteis | (Japan) Yosuke Watanuki (United States) Sebastian Korda (Germany) Tobias Kamke (Dominican Republic) Roberto Cid Subervi |
| February 17 | Koblenz Open; Koblenz, Germany; Challenger 80 – hard (i) – 48S/4Q/16D; Singles – Doubles | (Czech Republic) Tomáš Macháč; 6–3, 4–6, 6–3 | (Netherlands) Botic van de Zandschulp | (Spain) Nicola Kuhn (Belgium) Ruben Bemelmans | (Germany) Yannick Maden (Germany) Daniel Masur (Bulgaria) Dimitar Kuzmanov (Germany) Yannick Hanfmann |
| February 17 | Koblenz Open; Koblenz, Germany; Challenger 80 – hard (i) – 48S/4Q/16D; Singles – Doubles | (Netherlands) Sander Arends (Netherlands) David Pel; 7–6^{(7–4)}, 7–6^{(7–3)} | (Germany) Julian Lenz (Germany) Yannick Maden | (Spain) Nicola Kuhn (Belgium) Ruben Bemelmans | (Germany) Yannick Maden (Germany) Daniel Masur (Bulgaria) Dimitar Kuzmanov (Germany) Yannick Hanfmann |
| February 17 | Morelos Open; Cuernavaca, Mexico; Challenger 80 – hard – 48S/4Q/16D; Singles – Doubles | (Austria) Jurij Rodionov; 4–6, 6–2, 6–3 | (Argentina) Juan Pablo Ficovich | (Tunisia) Aziz Dougaz (Brazil) Guilherme Clezar | (United States) Alexander Sarkissian (Spain) Roberto Ortega Olmedo (Germany) Daniel Altmaier (Colombia) Alejandro González |
| February 17 | Morelos Open; Cuernavaca, Mexico; Challenger 80 – hard – 48S/4Q/16D; Singles – Doubles | (Australia) Luke Saville (Australia) John-Patrick Smith; 6–3, 6–7^{(4–7)}, [10–5] | (Spain) Carlos Gómez-Herrera (Japan) Shintaro Mochizuki | (Tunisia) Aziz Dougaz (Brazil) Guilherme Clezar | (United States) Alexander Sarkissian (Spain) Roberto Ortega Olmedo (Germany) Daniel Altmaier (Colombia) Alejandro González |
| February 24 | Teréga Open Pau–Pyrénées; Pau, France; Challenger 100 – hard (i) – 48S/4Q/16D; Singles – Doubles | (Latvia) Ernests Gulbis; 6–3, 6–4 | (Poland) Jerzy Janowicz | (Czech Republic) Jiří Veselý (Russia) Teymuraz Gabashvili | (France) Harold Mayot (France) Hugo Grenier (France) Benjamin Bonzi (France) Quentin Halys |
| February 24 | Teréga Open Pau–Pyrénées; Pau, France; Challenger 100 – hard (i) – 48S/4Q/16D; Singles – Doubles | (France) Benjamin Bonzi (France) Antoine Hoang; 6–3, 6–2 | (Italy) Simone Bolelli (Romania) Florin Mergea | (Czech Republic) Jiří Veselý (Russia) Teymuraz Gabashvili | (France) Harold Mayot (France) Hugo Grenier (France) Benjamin Bonzi (France) Quentin Halys |
| February 24 | Calgary National Bank Challenger; Calgary, Canada; Challenger 90 – hard (i) – 48S/4Q/16D; Singles – Doubles | (France) Arthur Rinderknech; 3–6, 7–6^{(7–5)}, 6–4 | (United States) Maxime Cressy | (Poland) Kacper Żuk (United Kingdom) Liam Broady | (Germany) Tobias Kamke (France) Geoffrey Blancaneaux (Japan) Yusuke Takahashi (Portugal) Gonçalo Oliveira |
| February 24 | Calgary National Bank Challenger; Calgary, Canada; Challenger 90 – hard (i) – 48S/4Q/16D; Singles – Doubles | (United States) Nathan Pasha (United States) Max Schnur; 7–6^{(7–4)}, 6–3 | (Australia) Harry Bourchier (Canada) Filip Peliwo | (Poland) Kacper Żuk (United Kingdom) Liam Broady | (Germany) Tobias Kamke (France) Geoffrey Blancaneaux (Japan) Yusuke Takahashi (Portugal) Gonçalo Oliveira |
| February 24 | Columbus Challenger; Columbus, United States; Challenger 80 – hard – 48S/4Q/16D; Singles – Doubles | (United States) J. J. Wolf; 6–4, 6–2 | (Uzbekistan) Denis Istomin | (Austria) Jurij Rodionov (Denmark) Mikael Torpegaard | (Japan) Kaichi Uchida (Australia) Aleksandar Vukic (Germany) Cedrik-Marcel Stebe (Australia) Marc Polmans |
| February 24 | Columbus Challenger; Columbus, United States; Challenger 80 – hard – 48S/4Q/16D; Singles – Doubles | (Philippines) Treat Huey (United States) Nathaniel Lammons; 7–6^{(7–3)}, 7–6^{(7–4)} | (United Kingdom) Lloyd Glasspool (United States) Alex Lawson | (Austria) Jurij Rodionov (Denmark) Mikael Torpegaard | (Japan) Kaichi Uchida (Australia) Aleksandar Vukic (Germany) Cedrik-Marcel Stebe (Australia) Marc Polmans |

=== March ===
| Week of | Tournament | Champions | Runners-up | Semifinalists | Quarterfinalists |
|---|---|---|---|---|---|
| March 2 | Oracle Challenger Series – Indian Wells; Indian Wells, United States; Challenger 125 – hard – 48S/4Q/16D; Singles – Doubles | (United States) Steve Johnson; 6–4, 6–4 | (United States) Jack Sock | (United States) Brandon Nakashima (United States) Mitchell Krueger | (United States) Denis Kudla (United States) Marcos Giron (France) Grégoire Barrère (United States) Noah Rubin |
| March 2 | Oracle Challenger Series – Indian Wells; Indian Wells, United States; Challenger 125 – hard – 48S/4Q/16D; Singles – Doubles | (United States) Denis Kudla (United States) Thai-Son Kwiatkowski; 6–3, 2–6, [10–6] | (United States) Sebastian Korda (United States) Mitchell Krueger | (United States) Brandon Nakashima (United States) Mitchell Krueger | (United States) Denis Kudla (United States) Marcos Giron (France) Grégoire Barrère (United States) Noah Rubin |
| March 2 | Monterrey Challenger; Monterrey, Mexico; Challenger 100 – hard – 48S/4Q/16D; Singles – Doubles | (France) Adrian Mannarino; 6–1, 6–3 | (Australia) Aleksandar Vukic | (United States) Ulises Blanch (United States) Ernesto Escobedo | (Australia) John-Patrick Smith (Spain) Pablo Andújar (Chinese Taipei) Jason Jung (United States) Kevin King |
| March 2 | Monterrey Challenger; Monterrey, Mexico; Challenger 100 – hard – 48S/4Q/16D; Singles – Doubles | (Poland) Karol Drzewiecki (Portugal) Gonçalo Oliveira; 6–7^{(5–7)}, 6–4, [11–9] | (Brazil) Orlando Luz (Brazil) Rafael Matos | (United States) Ulises Blanch (United States) Ernesto Escobedo | (Australia) John-Patrick Smith (Spain) Pablo Andújar (Chinese Taipei) Jason Jung (United States) Kevin King |
| March 9 | Nur-Sultan Challenger; Nur-Sultan, Kazakhstan; Challenger 80 – hard (i) – 48S/4Q/16D; Singles – Doubles | Rest of the matches cancelled due to the COVID-19 pandemic | | | (Netherlands) T Griekspoor vs (Russia) P Kotov (Spain) B Zapata Miralles vs (Russia) A Karatsev (Russia) R Safiullin vs (Belgium) K Coppejans (Netherlands) J de Jong vs (Ukraine) I Marchenko |
| March 9 | Potchefstroom Open; Potchefstroom, South Africa; Challenger 50 – hard – 32S/24Q/16D; Singles – Doubles | Rest of the matches cancelled due to the COVID-19 pandemic | | | (France) B Bonzi vs (France) S Doumbia (Germany) D Brown vs (Germany) D Masur vs (France) F Reboul (Zimbabwe) B Lock vs (France) H Grenier |
| Rest of March | | | | | |

=== April – July ===
No tournaments were held due to the COVID-19 pandemic, see cancelled tournaments below.

=== August ===
| Week of | Tournament | Champions | Runners-up | Semifinalists | Quarterfinalists |
|---|---|---|---|---|---|
| August 17 | Advantage Cars Prague Open; Prague, Czech Republic; Challenger 125 – clay – 48S/4Q/16D; Singles – Doubles | (Switzerland) Stan Wawrinka; 7–6^{(7–2)}, 6–4 | (Russia) Aslan Karatsev | (Czech Republic) Michael Vrbenský (France) Pierre-Hugues Herbert | (India) Sumit Nagal (Sweden) Elias Ymer (Netherlands) Tallon Griekspoor (Switzerland) Henri Laaksonen |
| August 17 | Advantage Cars Prague Open; Prague, Czech Republic; Challenger 125 – clay – 48S/4Q/16D; Singles – Doubles | (France) Pierre-Hugues Herbert (France) Arthur Rinderknech; 6–3, 6–4 | (Czech Republic) Zdeněk Kolář (Czech Republic) Lukáš Rosol | (Czech Republic) Michael Vrbenský (France) Pierre-Hugues Herbert | (India) Sumit Nagal (Sweden) Elias Ymer (Netherlands) Tallon Griekspoor (Switzerland) Henri Laaksonen |
| August 17 | Internazionali di Tennis Città di Todi; Todi, Italy; Challenger 100 – clay – 32S/16Q/16D; Singles – Doubles | (Germany) Yannick Hanfmann; 6–3, 6–3 | (Spain) Bernabé Zapata Miralles | (France) Antoine Hoang (Italy) Gian Marco Moroni | (Argentina) Facundo Bagnis (Italy) Federico Gaio (Germany) Cedrik-Marcel Stebe (Italy) Marco Cecchinato |
| August 17 | Internazionali di Tennis Città di Todi; Todi, Italy; Challenger 100 – clay – 32S/16Q/16D; Singles – Doubles | (Uruguay) Ariel Behar (Kazakhstan) Andrey Golubev; 6–4, 6–2 | (France) Elliot Benchetrit (France) Hugo Gaston | (France) Antoine Hoang (Italy) Gian Marco Moroni | (Argentina) Facundo Bagnis (Italy) Federico Gaio (Germany) Cedrik-Marcel Stebe (Italy) Marco Cecchinato |
| August 24 | RPM Open; Prague, Czech Republic; Challenger 125 – clay – 48S/4Q/16D; Singles – Doubles | (Russia) Aslan Karatsev; 6–4, 7–6^{(8–6)} | (Netherlands) Tallon Griekspoor | (Kazakhstan) Dmitry Popko (Czech Republic) Lukáš Rosol | (Switzerland) Stan Wawrinka (France) Arthur Rinderknech (Netherlands) Robin Haase (Austria) Sebastian Ofner |
| August 24 | RPM Open; Prague, Czech Republic; Challenger 125 – clay – 48S/4Q/16D; Singles – Doubles | (Netherlands) Sander Arends (Netherlands) David Pel; 7–5, 7–6^{(7–5)} | (Sweden) André Göransson (Portugal) Gonçalo Oliveira | (Kazakhstan) Dmitry Popko (Czech Republic) Lukáš Rosol | (Switzerland) Stan Wawrinka (France) Arthur Rinderknech (Netherlands) Robin Haase (Austria) Sebastian Ofner |
| August 24 | Internazionali di Tennis Città di Trieste; Trieste, Italy; Challenger 100 – clay – 32S/16Q/16D; Singles – Doubles | (Spain) Carlos Alcaraz; 6–4, 6–3 | (Italy) Riccardo Bonadio | (Italy) Lorenzo Musetti (Spain) Mario Vilella Martínez | (Argentina) Juan Pablo Ficovich (Argentina) Tomás Martín Etcheverry (United Kingdom) Liam Broady (Germany) Maximilian Marterer |
| August 24 | Internazionali di Tennis Città di Trieste; Trieste, Italy; Challenger 100 – clay – 32S/16Q/16D; Singles – Doubles | (Uruguay) Ariel Behar (Kazakhstan) Andrey Golubev; 6–4, 6–2 | (France) Hugo Gaston (France) Tristan Lamasine | (Italy) Lorenzo Musetti (Spain) Mario Vilella Martínez | (Argentina) Juan Pablo Ficovich (Argentina) Tomás Martín Etcheverry (United Kingdom) Liam Broady (Germany) Maximilian Marterer |
| August 31 | Prosperita Open; Ostrava, Czech Republic; Challenger 125 – clay – 32S/16Q/16D; Singles – Doubles | (Russia) Aslan Karatsev; 6–4, 6–2 | (Germany) Oscar Otte | (Netherlands) Botic van de Zandschulp (Netherlands) Tallon Griekspoor | (Slovakia) Lukáš Lacko (Germany) Mats Moraing (Czech Republic) Zdeněk Kolář (Belarus) Ilya Ivashka |
| August 31 | Prosperita Open; Ostrava, Czech Republic; Challenger 125 – clay – 32S/16Q/16D; Singles – Doubles | (New Zealand) Artem Sitak (Slovakia) Igor Zelenay; 7–5, 6–4 | (Poland) Karol Drzewiecki (Poland) Szymon Walków | (Netherlands) Botic van de Zandschulp (Netherlands) Tallon Griekspoor | (Slovakia) Lukáš Lacko (Germany) Mats Moraing (Czech Republic) Zdeněk Kolář (Belarus) Ilya Ivashka |
| August 31 | Internazionali di Tennis del Friuli Venezia Giulia; Cordenons, Italy; Challenger 100 – clay – 32S/16Q/16D; Singles – Doubles | (Spain) Bernabé Zapata Miralles; 6–2, 4–6, 6–2 | (Spain) Carlos Alcaraz | (Chile) Alejandro Tabilo (Germany) Daniel Altmaier | (Argentina) Andrea Collarini (Italy) Riccardo Bonadio (Argentina) Facundo Bagnis (Italy) Lorenzo Musetti |
| August 31 | Internazionali di Tennis del Friuli Venezia Giulia; Cordenons, Italy; Challenger 100 – clay – 32S/16Q/16D; Singles – Doubles | (Uruguay) Ariel Behar (Kazakhstan) Andrey Golubev; 7–5, 6–4 | (Argentina) Andrés Molteni (Monaco) Hugo Nys | (Chile) Alejandro Tabilo (Germany) Daniel Altmaier | (Argentina) Andrea Collarini (Italy) Riccardo Bonadio (Argentina) Facundo Bagnis (Italy) Lorenzo Musetti |

=== September ===
| Week of | Tournament | Champions | Runners-up | Semifinalists | Quarterfinalists |
|---|---|---|---|---|---|
| September 7 | Open du Pays d'Aix; Aix-en-Provence, France; Challenger 125 – clay – 32S/16Q/16D; Singles – Doubles | (Germany) Oscar Otte; 6–2, 6–7^{(4–7)}, 6–4 | (Brazil) Thiago Seyboth Wild | (Chile) Alejandro Tabilo (Germany) Daniel Altmaier | (Italy) Federico Gaio (France) Antoine Hoang (Serbia) Danilo Petrović (Uruguay) Pablo Cuevas |
| September 7 | Open du Pays d'Aix; Aix-en-Provence, France; Challenger 125 – clay – 32S/16Q/16D; Singles – Doubles | (Argentina) Andrés Molteni (Monaco) Hugo Nys; 6–4, 7–6^{(7–4)} | (Uruguay) Ariel Behar (Ecuador) Gonzalo Escobar | (Chile) Alejandro Tabilo (Germany) Daniel Altmaier | (Italy) Federico Gaio (France) Antoine Hoang (Serbia) Danilo Petrović (Uruguay) Pablo Cuevas |
| September 7 | Moneta Czech Open; Prostějov, Czech Republic; Challenger 125 – clay – 32S/16Q/16D; Singles – Doubles | (Poland) Kamil Majchrzak; 6–2, 7–6^{(7–5)} | (Spain) Pablo Andújar | (Italy) Stefano Travaglia (Czech Republic) Jiří Lehečka | (Slovakia) Jozef Kovalík (Slovakia) Martin Kližan (Slovakia) Filip Horanský (Australia) Aleksandar Vukic |
| September 7 | Moneta Czech Open; Prostějov, Czech Republic; Challenger 125 – clay – 32S/16Q/16D; Singles – Doubles | (Czech Republic) Zdeněk Kolář (Czech Republic) Lukáš Rosol; 6–2, 2–6, [10–6] | (India) Sriram Balaji (India) Divij Sharan | (Italy) Stefano Travaglia (Czech Republic) Jiří Lehečka | (Slovakia) Jozef Kovalík (Slovakia) Martin Kližan (Slovakia) Filip Horanský (Australia) Aleksandar Vukic |
| September 14 | Iași Open; Iași, Romania; Challenger 100 – clay – 32S/16Q/16D; Singles – Doubles | (Spain) Carlos Taberner; 6–4, 7–6^{(7–4)} | (France) Mathias Bourgue | (Spain) Pablo Andújar (Spain) Jaume Munar | (Brazil) Felipe Meligeni Alves (Austria) Jurij Rodionov (Spain) Adrián Menéndez Maceiras (Brazil) João Menezes |
| September 14 | Iași Open; Iași, Romania; Challenger 100 – clay – 32S/16Q/16D; Singles – Doubles | (Brazil) Rafael Matos (Brazil) João Menezes; 6–2, 6–2 | (Philippines) Treat Huey (United States) Nathaniel Lammons | (Spain) Pablo Andújar (Spain) Jaume Munar | (Brazil) Felipe Meligeni Alves (Austria) Jurij Rodionov (Spain) Adrián Menéndez Maceiras (Brazil) João Menezes |
| September 21 | Internazionali di Tennis Città di Forlì; Forlì, Italy; Challenger 100 – clay – 32S/16Q/16D; Singles – Doubles | (Italy) Lorenzo Musetti; 7–6^{(7–2)}, 7–6^{(7–5)} | (Brazil) Thiago Monteiro | (South Africa) Lloyd Harris (Italy) Andrea Pellegrino | (Italy) Andreas Seppi (Italy) Salvatore Caruso (United States) Alexander Ritschard (Brazil) Guilherme Clezar |
| September 21 | Internazionali di Tennis Città di Forlì; Forlì, Italy; Challenger 100 – clay – 32S/16Q/16D; Singles – Doubles | (Bosnia and Herzegovina) Tomislav Brkić (Serbia) Nikola Ćaćić; 3–6, 7–5, [10–3] | (Kazakhstan) Andrey Golubev (Italy) Andrea Vavassori | (South Africa) Lloyd Harris (Italy) Andrea Pellegrino | (Italy) Andreas Seppi (Italy) Salvatore Caruso (United States) Alexander Ritschard (Brazil) Guilherme Clezar |
| September 21 | Sibiu Open; Sibiu, Romania; Challenger 80 – clay – 32S/16Q/16D; Singles – Doubles | (Switzerland) Marc-Andrea Hüsler; 7–5, 6–0 | (Argentina) Tomás Martín Etcheverry | (Spain) Carlos Gómez-Herrera (Argentina) Francisco Cerúndolo | (Germany) Johannes Härteis (Croatia) Borna Gojo (Tunisia) Malek Jaziri (Brazil) Felipe Meligeni Alves |
| September 21 | Sibiu Open; Sibiu, Romania; Challenger 80 – clay – 32S/16Q/16D; Singles – Doubles | (United States) Hunter Reese (Poland) Jan Zieliński; 6–4, 6–2 | (United States) Robert Galloway (Mexico) Hans Hach Verdugo | (Spain) Carlos Gómez-Herrera (Argentina) Francisco Cerúndolo | (Germany) Johannes Härteis (Croatia) Borna Gojo (Tunisia) Malek Jaziri (Brazil) Felipe Meligeni Alves |
| September 28 | Thindown Challenger Biella; Biella, Italy; Challenger 80 – clay – 32S/16Q/16D; Singles – Doubles | (Argentina) Facundo Bagnis; 6–7^{(4–7)}, 6–4, 0–0 ret. | (Slovenia) Blaž Kavčič | (Slovenia) Blaž Rola (Australia) Christopher O'Connell | (Italy) Matteo Viola (United States) Maxime Cressy (Slovakia) Filip Horanský (Uzbekistan) Denis Istomin |
| September 28 | Thindown Challenger Biella; Biella, Italy; Challenger 80 – clay – 32S/16Q/16D; Singles – Doubles | (Finland) Harri Heliövaara (Poland) Szymon Walków; 7–5, 6–3 | (United Kingdom) Lloyd Glasspool (United States) Alex Lawson | (Slovenia) Blaž Rola (Australia) Christopher O'Connell | (Italy) Matteo Viola (United States) Maxime Cressy (Slovakia) Filip Horanský (Uzbekistan) Denis Istomin |
| September 28 | Split Open; Split, Croatia; Challenger 80 – clay – 32S/16Q/16D; Singles – Doubles | (Argentina) Francisco Cerúndolo; 4–6, 6–3, 7–6^{(7–4)} | (Portugal) Pedro Sousa | (Croatia) Borna Gojo (Croatia) Duje Ajduković | (Argentina) Tomás Martín Etcheverry (Italy) Alessandro Giannessi (Germany) Maximilian Marterer (Slovakia) Jozef Kovalík |
| September 28 | Split Open; Split, Croatia; Challenger 80 – clay – 32S/16Q/16D; Singles – Doubles | (Philippines) Treat Huey (United States) Nathaniel Lammons; 6–4, 7–6^{(7–3)} | (Sweden) André Göransson (United States) Hunter Reese | (Croatia) Borna Gojo (Croatia) Duje Ajduković | (Argentina) Tomás Martín Etcheverry (Italy) Alessandro Giannessi (Germany) Maximilian Marterer (Slovakia) Jozef Kovalík |

=== October ===
| Week of | Tournament | Champions | Runners-up | Semifinalists | Quarterfinalists |
|---|---|---|---|---|---|
| October 5 | Internazionali di Tennis Emilia Romagna; Parma, Italy; Challenger 125 – clay – 32S/16Q/16D; Singles – Doubles | (United States) Frances Tiafoe; 6–3, 3–6, 6–4 | (Italy) Salvatore Caruso | (Argentina) Federico Delbonis (Australia) Alexei Popyrin | (Italy) Filippo Baldi (Italy) Marco Cecchinato (Serbia) Laslo Đere (Argentina) Juan Pablo Ficovich |
| October 5 | Internazionali di Tennis Emilia Romagna; Parma, Italy; Challenger 125 – clay – 32S/16Q/16D; Singles – Doubles | (El Salvador) Marcelo Arévalo (Bosnia and Herzegovina) Tomislav Brkić; 6–4, 6–4 | (Uruguay) Ariel Behar (Ecuador) Gonzalo Escobar | (Argentina) Federico Delbonis (Australia) Alexei Popyrin | (Italy) Filippo Baldi (Italy) Marco Cecchinato (Serbia) Laslo Đere (Argentina) Juan Pablo Ficovich |
| October 5 | Sánchez-Casal Cup; Barcelona, Spain; Challenger 80 – clay – 32S/16Q/16D; Singles – Doubles | (Spain) Carlos Alcaraz; 4–6, 6–2, 6–1 | (Bosnia and Herzegovina) Damir Džumhur | (Argentina) Andrea Collarini (Spain) Carlos Gimeno Valero | (Spain) Jaume Munar (Slovakia) Filip Horanský (France) Maxime Janvier (Argentina) Facundo Bagnis |
| October 5 | Sánchez-Casal Cup; Barcelona, Spain; Challenger 80 – clay – 32S/16Q/16D; Singles – Doubles | (Poland) Szymon Walków (Austria) Tristan-Samuel Weissborn; 6–1, 4–6, [10–8] | (Finland) Harri Heliövaara (United States) Alex Lawson | (Argentina) Andrea Collarini (Spain) Carlos Gimeno Valero | (Spain) Jaume Munar (Slovakia) Filip Horanský (France) Maxime Janvier (Argentina) Facundo Bagnis |
| October 12 (Note: The JC Ferrero Challenger Open was originally due to take place on 13–19 April but was rescheduled due to the COVID-19 pandemic.) (Note: The Lisboa Belém Open was originally due to take place on 4–10 May but was rescheduled due to the COVID-19 pandemic.) | JC Ferrero Challenger Open; Alicante, Spain; Challenger 80 – clay – 32S/16Q/16D; Singles – Doubles | (Spain) Carlos Alcaraz; 7–6^{(8–6)}, 6–3 | (Spain) Pedro Martínez | (Spain) Bernabé Zapata Miralles (Spain) Mario Vilella Martínez | (Czech Republic) Tomáš Macháč (Australia) Aleksandar Vukic (Argentina) Juan Pablo Ficovich (Canada) Steven Diez |
| October 12 | JC Ferrero Challenger Open; Alicante, Spain; Challenger 80 – clay – 32S/16Q/16D; Singles – Doubles | (France) Enzo Couacaud (France) Albano Olivetti; 4–6, 6–4, [10–2] | (Spain) Íñigo Cervantes (Spain) Oriol Roca Batalla | (Spain) Bernabé Zapata Miralles (Spain) Mario Vilella Martínez | (Czech Republic) Tomáš Macháč (Australia) Aleksandar Vukic (Argentina) Juan Pablo Ficovich (Canada) Steven Diez |
| October 12 | Lisboa Belém Open; Lisbon, Portugal; Challenger 80 – clay – 32S/16Q/16D; Singles – Doubles | (Spain) Jaume Munar; 7–6^{(7–3)}, 6–2 | (Portugal) Pedro Sousa | (Italy) Federico Gaio (Italy) Alessandro Giannessi | (France) Alexandre Müller (Brazil) Guilherme Clezar (Bulgaria) Dimitar Kuzmanov (Kazakhstan) Dmitry Popko |
| October 12 | Lisboa Belém Open; Lisbon, Portugal; Challenger 80 – clay – 32S/16Q/16D; Singles – Doubles | (Dominican Republic) Roberto Cid Subervi (Portugal) Gonçalo Oliveira; 7–6^{(7–5)}, 4–6, [10–4] | (Finland) Harri Heliövaara (Czech Republic) Zdeněk Kolář | (Italy) Federico Gaio (Italy) Alessandro Giannessi | (France) Alexandre Müller (Brazil) Guilherme Clezar (Bulgaria) Dimitar Kuzmanov (Kazakhstan) Dmitry Popko |
| October 19 | Amex-Istanbul Challenger; Istanbul, Turkey; Challenger 100 – hard – 32S/16Q/16D; Singles – Doubles | (Belarus) Ilya Ivashka; 6–1, 6–4 | (Slovakia) Martin Kližan | (Croatia) Borna Gojo (France) Benjamin Bonzi | (United States) Mackenzie McDonald (Austria) Sebastian Ofner (Chinese Taipei) Jason Jung (Kazakhstan) Dmitry Popko |
| October 19 | Amex-Istanbul Challenger; Istanbul, Turkey; Challenger 100 – hard – 32S/16Q/16D; Singles – Doubles | (Uruguay) Ariel Behar (Ecuador) Gonzalo Escobar; 4–6, 6–3, [10–7] | (United States) Robert Galloway (United States) Nathaniel Lammons | (Croatia) Borna Gojo (France) Benjamin Bonzi | (United States) Mackenzie McDonald (Austria) Sebastian Ofner (Chinese Taipei) Jason Jung (Kazakhstan) Dmitry Popko |
| October 19 | Wolffkran Open; Ismaning, Germany; Challenger 80 – carpet (i) – 32S/16Q/16D; Singles – Doubles | (Switzerland) Marc-Andrea Hüsler; 6–7^{(3–7)}, 7–6^{(7–2)}, 7–5 | (Netherlands) Botic van de Zandschulp | (France) Antoine Hoang (India) Prajnesh Gunneswaran | (United States) Sebastian Korda (Germany) Maximilian Marterer (Germany) Daniel Masur (Germany) Tobias Kamke |
| October 19 | Wolffkran Open; Ismaning, Germany; Challenger 80 – carpet (i) – 32S/16Q/16D; Singles – Doubles | (Germany) Andre Begemann (Netherlands) David Pel; 5–7, 7–6^{(7–2)}, [10–4] | (United Kingdom) Lloyd Glasspool (United States) Alex Lawson | (France) Antoine Hoang (India) Prajnesh Gunneswaran | (United States) Sebastian Korda (Germany) Maximilian Marterer (Germany) Daniel Masur (Germany) Tobias Kamke |
| October 26 (Note: The Marbella Tennis Open was originally due to take place on 30 March–5 April but was rescheduled due to the COVID-19 pandemic.) | Tennis Challenger Hamburg; Hamburg, Germany; Challenger 80 – hard (i) – 32S/16Q/16D; Singles – Doubles | (Japan) Taro Daniel; 6–1, 6–2 | (Austria) Sebastian Ofner | (Poland) Kamil Majchrzak (Netherlands) Botic van de Zandschulp | (Serbia) Nikola Milojević (Russia) Roman Safiullin (Germany) Cedrik-Marcel Stebe (Switzerland) Henri Laaksonen |
| October 26 | Tennis Challenger Hamburg; Hamburg, Germany; Challenger 80 – hard (i) – 32S/16Q/16D; Singles – Doubles | (Switzerland) Marc-Andrea Hüsler (Poland) Kamil Majchrzak; 6–3, 1–6, [20–18] | (United Kingdom) Lloyd Glasspool (United States) Alex Lawson | (Poland) Kamil Majchrzak (Netherlands) Botic van de Zandschulp | (Serbia) Nikola Milojević (Russia) Roman Safiullin (Germany) Cedrik-Marcel Stebe (Switzerland) Henri Laaksonen |
| October 26 | Marbella Tennis Open; Marbella, Spain; Challenger 80 – clay – 32S/16Q/16D; Singles – Doubles | (Spain) Pedro Martínez; 7–6^{(7–4)}, 6–2 | (Spain) Jaume Munar | (France) Alexandre Müller (Spain) Carlos Taberner | (Spain) Carlos Gimeno Valero (Czech Republic) Vít Kopřiva (Colombia) Daniel Elahi Galán (Slovenia) Blaž Rola |
| October 26 | Marbella Tennis Open; Marbella, Spain; Challenger 80 – clay – 32S/16Q/16D; Singles – Doubles | (Spain) Gerard Granollers (Spain) Pedro Martínez; 6–3, 6–4 | (Venezuela) Luis David Martínez (Brazil) Fernando Romboli | (France) Alexandre Müller (Spain) Carlos Taberner | (Spain) Carlos Gimeno Valero (Czech Republic) Vít Kopřiva (Colombia) Daniel Elahi Galán (Slovenia) Blaž Rola |

=== November ===
| Week of | Tournament | Champions | Runners-up | Semifinalists | Quarterfinalists |
|---|---|---|---|---|---|
| November 2 | Challenger Eckental; Eckental, Germany; Challenger 100 – carpet (i) – 32S/16Q/16D; Singles – Doubles | (United States) Sebastian Korda; 6–4, 6–4 | (India) Ramkumar Ramanathan | (Germany) Marvin Möller (Belarus) Ilya Ivashka | (Poland) Kamil Majchrzak (Russia) Evgeny Donskoy (Switzerland) Marc-Andrea Hüsler (Australia) Alexei Popyrin |
| November 2 | Challenger Eckental; Eckental, Germany; Challenger 100 – carpet (i) – 32S/16Q/16D; Singles – Doubles | (Germany) Dustin Brown (France) Antoine Hoang; 6–7^{(8–10)}, 7–5, [13–11] | (United Kingdom) Lloyd Glasspool (United States) Alex Lawson | (Germany) Marvin Möller (Belarus) Ilya Ivashka | (Poland) Kamil Majchrzak (Russia) Evgeny Donskoy (Switzerland) Marc-Andrea Hüsler (Australia) Alexei Popyrin |
| November 2 | Internazionali di Tennis Città di Parma; Parma, Italy; Challenger 80 – hard (i) – 32S/16Q/16D; Singles – Doubles | (Germany) Cedrik-Marcel Stebe; 6–4, 6–4 | (United Kingdom) Liam Broady | (Italy) Andrea Arnaboldi (France) Quentin Halys | (Portugal) Frederico Ferreira Silva (United States) Maxime Cressy (Italy) Roberto Marcora (Italy) Luca Vanni |
| November 2 | Internazionali di Tennis Città di Parma; Parma, Italy; Challenger 80 – hard (i) – 32S/16Q/16D; Singles – Doubles | (France) Grégoire Barrère (France) Albano Olivetti; 6–2, 6–4 | (France) Sadio Doumbia (France) Fabien Reboul | (Italy) Andrea Arnaboldi (France) Quentin Halys | (Portugal) Frederico Ferreira Silva (United States) Maxime Cressy (Italy) Roberto Marcora (Italy) Luca Vanni |
| November 9 | Slovak Open; Bratislava, Slovakia; Challenger 80 – hard (i) – 32S/16Q/16D; Singles – Doubles | (Germany) Maximilian Marterer; 6–7^{(3–7)}, 6–2, 7–5 | (Czech Republic) Tomáš Macháč | (Slovakia) Lukáš Klein (France) Antoine Hoang | (Finland) Emil Ruusuvuori (Italy) Matteo Viola (France) Mathias Bourgue (Ukraine) Sergiy Stakhovsky |
| November 9 | Slovak Open; Bratislava, Slovakia; Challenger 80 – hard (i) – 32S/16Q/16D; Singles – Doubles | (Finland) Harri Heliövaara (Finland) Emil Ruusuvuori; 6–4, 6–3 | (Slovakia) Lukáš Klein (Slovakia) Alex Molčan | (Slovakia) Lukáš Klein (France) Antoine Hoang | (Finland) Emil Ruusuvuori (Italy) Matteo Viola (France) Mathias Bourgue (Ukraine) Sergiy Stakhovsky |
| November 9 | Cary Challenger; Cary, United States; Challenger 80 – hard – 32S/16Q/16D; Singles – Doubles | (United States) Denis Kudla; 3–6, 6–3, 6–0 | (India) Prajnesh Gunneswaran | (Denmark) Mikael Torpegaard (Colombia) Daniel Elahi Galán | (United States) Brandon Nakashima (Brazil) Thomaz Bellucci (United States) Christopher Eubanks (Kazakhstan) Dmitry Popko |
| November 9 | Cary Challenger; Cary, United States; Challenger 80 – hard – 32S/16Q/16D; Singles – Doubles | (Russia) Teymuraz Gabashvili (United States) Dennis Novikov; 7–5, 4–6, [10–8] | (United Kingdom) Luke Bambridge (United States) Nathaniel Lammons | (Denmark) Mikael Torpegaard (Colombia) Daniel Elahi Galán | (United States) Brandon Nakashima (Brazil) Thomaz Bellucci (United States) Christopher Eubanks (Kazakhstan) Dmitry Popko |
| November 16 (Note: The Challenger Ciudad de Guayaquil was originally due to take place on 9–15 November but was rescheduled due to the COVID-19 pandemic.) (Note: The Orlando Open was originally due to take place on 24–30 August but was rescheduled due to the COVID-19 pandemic.) | Challenger Ciudad de Guayaquil; Guayaquil, Ecuador; Challenger 80 – clay – 32S/16Q/16D; Singles – Doubles | (Argentina) Francisco Cerúndolo; 6–4, 3–6, 6–2 | (Slovakia) Andrej Martin | (Netherlands) Jesper de Jong (Spain) Roberto Carballés Baena | (Spain) Oriol Roca Batalla (Argentina) Sebastián Báez (Spain) Jaume Munar (Portugal) Pedro Sousa |
| November 16 | Challenger Ciudad de Guayaquil; Guayaquil, Ecuador; Challenger 80 – clay – 32S/16Q/16D; Singles – Doubles | (Venezuela) Luis David Martínez (Brazil) Felipe Meligeni Alves; 6–0, 4–6, [10–3] | (Spain) Sergio Martos Gornés (Spain) Jaume Munar | (Netherlands) Jesper de Jong (Spain) Roberto Carballés Baena | (Spain) Oriol Roca Batalla (Argentina) Sebastián Báez (Spain) Jaume Munar (Portugal) Pedro Sousa |
| November 16 | Orlando Open; Orlando, United States; Challenger 80 – hard – 32S/16Q/16D; Singles – Doubles | (United States) Brandon Nakashima; 6–3, 6–4 | (India) Prajnesh Gunneswaran | (United States) Mitchell Krueger (United States) Christopher Eubanks | (United States) Mackenzie McDonald (United States) Alexander Ritschard (Kazakhstan) Dmitry Popko (United States) Denis Kudla |
| November 16 | Orlando Open; Orlando, United States; Challenger 80 – hard – 32S/16Q/16D; Singles – Doubles | (Kazakhstan) Andrey Golubev (Kazakhstan) Aleksandr Nedovyesov; 7–5, 6–4 | (United States) Mitchell Krueger (United States) Jackson Withrow | (United States) Mitchell Krueger (United States) Christopher Eubanks | (United States) Mackenzie McDonald (United States) Alexander Ritschard (Kazakhstan) Dmitry Popko (United States) Denis Kudla |
| November 16 | Sparkassen ATP Challenger; Ortisei, Italy; Challenger 80 – hard (i) – 32S/16Q/16D; Singles – Doubles | (Belarus) Ilya Ivashka; 6–4, 3–6, 7–6^{(7–3)} | (France) Antoine Hoang | (France) Alexandre Müller (Russia) Aslan Karatsev | (Ukraine) Illya Marchenko (Germany) Julian Lenz (Italy) Federico Gaio (Czech Republic) Tomáš Macháč |
| November 16 | Sparkassen ATP Challenger; Ortisei, Italy; Challenger 80 – hard (i) – 32S/16Q/16D; Singles – Doubles | (Germany) Andre Begemann (France) Albano Olivetti; 6–3, 6–2 | (Croatia) Ivan Sabanov (Croatia) Matej Sabanov | (France) Alexandre Müller (Russia) Aslan Karatsev | (Ukraine) Illya Marchenko (Germany) Julian Lenz (Italy) Federico Gaio (Czech Republic) Tomáš Macháč |
| November 23 (Note: The Florianópolis Challenger was originally due to take place on 6–12 April but was rescheduled and moved to São Paulo due to the COVID-19 pandemic.) | São Paulo Challenger de Tênis; São Paulo, Brazil; Challenger 80 – clay – 32S/16Q/16D; Singles – Doubles | (Brazil) Felipe Meligeni Alves; 6–2, 7–6^{(7–1)} | (Portugal) Frederico Ferreira Silva | (Brazil) Pedro Sakamoto (Brazil) João Menezes | (France) Maxime Janvier (Kazakhstan) Dmitry Popko (Argentina) Camilo Ugo Carabelli (Brazil) Matheus Pucinelli de Almeida |
| November 23 | São Paulo Challenger de Tênis; São Paulo, Brazil; Challenger 80 – clay – 32S/16Q/16D; Singles – Doubles | (Venezuela) Luis David Martínez (Brazil) Felipe Meligeni Alves; 6–3, 6–3 | (Brazil) Rogério Dutra Silva (Brazil) Fernando Romboli | (Brazil) Pedro Sakamoto (Brazil) João Menezes | (France) Maxime Janvier (Kazakhstan) Dmitry Popko (Argentina) Camilo Ugo Carabelli (Brazil) Matheus Pucinelli de Almeida |
| November 23 | Lima Challenger; Lima, Peru; Challenger 80 – clay – 32S/16Q/16D; Singles – Doubles | (Colombia) Daniel Elahi Galán; 6–1, 3–6, 6–3 | (Argentina) Thiago Agustín Tirante | (Ukraine) Vitaliy Sachko (Chile) Marcelo Tomás Barrios Vera | (Argentina) Francisco Cerúndolo (Chile) Alejandro Tabilo (Czech Republic) Vít Kopřiva (Spain) Roberto Carballés Baena |
| November 23 | Lima Challenger; Lima, Peru; Challenger 80 – clay – 32S/16Q/16D; Singles – Doubles | (Spain) Íñigo Cervantes (Spain) Oriol Roca Batalla; 6–3, 6–4 | (United States) Collin Altamirano (Ukraine) Vitaliy Sachko | (Ukraine) Vitaliy Sachko (Chile) Marcelo Tomás Barrios Vera | (Argentina) Francisco Cerúndolo (Chile) Alejandro Tabilo (Czech Republic) Vít Kopřiva (Spain) Roberto Carballés Baena |
| November 30 (Note: The Maia Challenger was originally due to take place on 23–29 November but was rescheduled due to the COVID-19 pandemic.) | Campeonato International de Tênis de Campinas; Campinas, Brazil; Challenger 80 – clay – 32S/16Q/16D; Singles – Doubles | (Argentina) Francisco Cerúndolo; 6–4, 3–6, 6–3 | (Spain) Roberto Carballés Baena | (Colombia) Daniel Elahi Galán (Brazil) Felipe Meligeni Alves | (Egypt) Mohamed Safwat (Kazakhstan) Dmitry Popko (Argentina) Facundo Bagnis (Chile) Alejandro Tabilo |
| November 30 | Campeonato International de Tênis de Campinas; Campinas, Brazil; Challenger 80 – clay – 32S/16Q/16D; Singles – Doubles | (France) Sadio Doumbia (France) Fabien Reboul; 6–7^{(7–9)}, 7–5, [10–7] | (Venezuela) Luis David Martínez (Brazil) Felipe Meligeni Alves | (Colombia) Daniel Elahi Galán (Brazil) Felipe Meligeni Alves | (Egypt) Mohamed Safwat (Kazakhstan) Dmitry Popko (Argentina) Facundo Bagnis (Chile) Alejandro Tabilo |
| November 30 | Maia Challenger; Maia, Portugal; Challenger 80 – clay (i) – 32S/16Q/16D; Singles – Doubles | (Portugal) Pedro Sousa; 6–0, 5–7, 6–2 | (Spain) Carlos Taberner | (Croatia) Duje Ajduković (Spain) Bernabé Zapata Miralles | (Italy) Andrea Arnaboldi (Slovakia) Jozef Kovalík (Switzerland) Henri Laaksonen (Belgium) Kimmer Coppejans |
| November 30 | Maia Challenger; Maia, Portugal; Challenger 80 – clay (i) – 32S/16Q/16D; Singles – Doubles | (Czech Republic) Zdeněk Kolář (Italy) Andrea Vavassori; 6–3, 6–4 | (United Kingdom) Lloyd Glasspool (Finland) Harri Heliövaara | (Croatia) Duje Ajduković (Spain) Bernabé Zapata Miralles | (Italy) Andrea Arnaboldi (Slovakia) Jozef Kovalík (Switzerland) Henri Laaksonen (Belgium) Kimmer Coppejans |

== Cancelled tournaments ==
The following tournaments were cancelled due to the COVID-19 pandemic.

| Week of | Tournament |
|---|---|
| March 16 | Arizona Tennis Classic; Phoenix, United States; Challenger 125 – hard |
| March 16 | Olímpia Tennis Classic; Olímpia, Brazil; Challenger 50 – clay |
| March 23 | Play In Challenger; Lille, France; Challenger 90 – hard |
| March 23 | Machala Challenger; Machala, Ecuador; Challenger 80 – clay |
| March 30 | Mexico City Open; Mexico City, Mexico; Challenger 125 – clay |
| March 30 | Jerusalem Volvo Open; Jerusalem, Israel; Challenger 80 – hard |
| March 30 | Open Harmonie mutuelle Saint-Brieuc, France; Challenger 80 – hard |
| April 6 | Open Città della Disfida; Barletta, Italy; Challenger 80 – clay |
| April 6 | San Luis Open Challenger Tour; San Luis Potosí, Mexico; Challenger 80 – clay |
| April 6 | Murcia Open; Murcia, Spain; Challenger 80 – clay |
| April 13 | Sarasota Open; Sarasota, United States; Challenger 100 – clay |
| April 13 | Keio Challenger; Yokohama, Japan; Challenger 80 – hard |
| April 13 | Tunis Open; Tunis, Tunisia; Challenger 80 – clay |
| April 20 | Internazionali di Tennis d'Abruzzo; Francavilla al Mare, Italy; Challenger 80 – clay |
| April 20 | Matsuyama Challenger; Matsuyama, Japan; Challenger 80 – hard |
| April 20 | Manzanillo Open; Manzanillo, Mexico; Challenger 80 – hard |
| April 20 | Tallahassee Tennis Challenger; Tallahassee, United States; Challenger 80 – clay |
| April 27 | Puerto Vallarta Open; Puerto Vallarta, Mexico; Challenger 110 – hard |
| April 27 | Savannah Challenger; Savannah, United States; Challenger 80 – clay |
| April 27 | Garden Open; Rome, Italy; Challenger 80 – clay |
| May 4 | Shymkent Challenger; Shymkent, Kazakhstan; Challenger 80 – clay |
| May 11 | BNP Paribas Primrose Bordeaux; Bordeaux, France; Challenger 125 – clay |
| May 11 | Heilbronner Neckarcup; Heilbronn, Germany; Challenger 100 – clay |
| May 11 | Braga Open; Braga, Portugal; Challenger 80 – clay |
| May 18 | Yokkaichi Challenger; Yokkaichi, Japan; Challenger 80 – hard |
| May 25 | Internazionali di Tennis Città di Vicenza; Vicenza, Italy; Challenger 80 – clay |
| June 1 | Surbiton Trophy; Surbiton, United Kingdom; Challenger 125 – grass |
| June 1 | Poznań Open; Poznań, Poland; Challenger 90 – clay |
| June 1 | Little Rock Challenger; Little Rock, United States; Challenger 90 – hard |
| June 1 | Almaty Challenger; Almaty, Kazakhstan; Challenger 80 – clay |
| June 8 | Nottingham Open; Nottingham, United Kingdom; Challenger 125 – grass |
| June 8 | Open Sopra Steria de Lyon; Lyon, France; Challenger 100 – clay |
| June 8 | RBC Tennis Championships of Dallas; Dallas, United States; Challenger 80 – hard |
| June 8 | Aspria Tennis Cup; Milan, Italy; Challenger 80 – clay |
| June 8 | Shymkent Challenger II; Shymkent, Kazakhstan; Challenger 80 – clay |
| June 15 | Ilkley Trophy; Ilkley, United Kingdom; Challenger 125 – grass |
| June 15 | Bratislava Open; Bratislava, Slovakia; Challenger 90 – clay |
| June 15 | Internationaux de Tennis de Blois; Blois, France; Challenger 80 – clay |
| June 29 | Guzzini Challenger; Recanati, Italy; Challenger 80 – hard |
| June 29 | Internationaux de Tennis de Troyes; Troyes, France; Challenger 50 – clay |
| August 31 | Orlando Open II; Orlando, United States; Challenger 125 – hard |
| September 21 | Columbus Challenger II; Columbus, United States; Challenger 80 – hard (i) |
| October 19 | Murcia Open; Murcia, Spain; Challenger 80 – clay |
| November 9 | Open International de Tennis de Roanne; Roanne, France; Challenger 100 – clay (i) |
| November 23 | Open Città di Bari; Bari, Italy; Challenger 80 – hard |
| November 30 | Open d'Orléans; Orléans, France; Challenger 125 – hard (i) |

== Statistical information ==
These tables present the number of singles (S) and doubles (D) titles won by each player and each nation during the season. The players/nations are sorted by: 1) total number of titles (a doubles title won by two players representing the same nation counts as only one win for the nation); 2) a singles > doubles hierarchy; 3) alphabetical order (by family names for players).

To avoid confusion and double counting, these tables should be updated only after an event is completed.

=== Titles won by player ===
| Total | Player | S | D | S | D |
|---|---|---|---|---|---|
| 6 | Andrey Golubev (KAZ) | | ● ● ● ● ● ● | 0 | 6 |
| 5 | Ariel Behar (URU) | | ● ● ● ● ● | 0 | 5 |
| 4 | Arthur Rinderknech (FRA) | ● ● | ● ● | 2 | 2 |
| 3 | Carlos Alcaraz (ESP) | ● ● ● | | 3 | 0 |
| 3 | Francisco Cerúndolo (ARG) | ● ● ● | | 3 | 0 |
| 3 | Marc-Andrea Hüsler (SUI) | ● ● | ● | 2 | 1 |
| 3 | Felipe Meligeni Alves (BRA) | ● | ● ● | 1 | 2 |
| 3 | Gonzalo Escobar (ECU) | | ● ● ● | 0 | 3 |
| 3 | Harri Heliövaara (FIN) | | ● ● ● | 0 | 3 |
| 3 | Treat Huey (PHI) | | ● ● ● | 0 | 3 |
| 3 | Zdeněk Kolář (CZE) | | ● ● ● | 0 | 3 |
| 3 | Nathaniel Lammons (USA) | | ● ● ● | 0 | 3 |
| 3 | Aleksandr Nedovyesov (KAZ) | | ● ● ● | 0 | 3 |
| 3 | Gonçalo Oliveira (POR) | | ● ● ● | 0 | 3 |
| 3 | Albano Olivetti (FRA) | | ● ● ● | 0 | 3 |
| 3 | David Pel (NED) | | ● ● ● | 0 | 3 |
| 2 | Taro Daniel (JPN) | ● ● | | 2 | 0 |
| 2 | Ilya Ivashka (BLR) | ● ● | | 2 | 0 |
| 2 | Steve Johnson (USA) | ● ● | | 2 | 0 |
| 2 | Aslan Karatsev (RUS) | ● ● | | 2 | 0 |
| 2 | Jurij Rodionov (AUT) | ● ● | | 2 | 0 |
| 2 | J. J. Wolf (USA) | ● ● | | 2 | 0 |
| 2 | Denis Kudla (USA) | ● | ● | 1 | 1 |
| 2 | Thai-Son Kwiatkowski (USA) | ● | ● | 1 | 1 |
| 2 | Kamil Majchrzak (POL) | ● | ● | 1 | 1 |
| 2 | Pedro Martínez (ESP) | ● | ● | 1 | 1 |
| 2 | Roman Safiullin (RUS) | ● | ● | 1 | 1 |
| 2 | Sander Arends (NED) | | ● ● | 0 | 2 |
| 2 | Andre Begemann (GER) | | ● ● | 0 | 2 |
| 2 | Tomislav Brkić (BIH) | | ● ● | 0 | 2 |
| 2 | Nikola Ćaćić (SRB) | | ● ● | 0 | 2 |
| 2 | Antoine Hoang (FRA) | | ● ● | 0 | 2 |
| 2 | Luis David Martínez (VEN) | | ● ● | 0 | 2 |
| 2 | Rafael Matos (BRA) | | ● ● | 0 | 2 |
| 2 | Dennis Novikov (USA) | | ● ● | 0 | 2 |
| 2 | Luke Saville (AUS) | | ● ● | 0 | 2 |
| 2 | Szymon Walków (POL) | | ● ● | 0 | 2 |
| 2 | Tristan-Samuel Weissborn (AUT) | | ● ● | 0 | 2 |
| 1 | Facundo Bagnis (ARG) | ● | | 1 | 0 |
| 1 | Attila Balázs (HUN) | ● | | 1 | 0 |
| 1 | Ulises Blanch (USA) | ● | | 1 | 0 |
| 1 | Maxime Cressy (USA) | ● | | 1 | 0 |
| 1 | James Duckworth (AUS) | ● | | 1 | 0 |
| 1 | Federico Gaio (ITA) | ● | | 1 | 0 |
| 1 | Daniel Elahi Galán (COL) | ● | | 1 | 0 |
| 1 | Ernests Gulbis (LAT) | ● | | 1 | 0 |
| 1 | Yannick Hanfmann (GER) | ● | | 1 | 0 |
| 1 | Cem İlkel (TUR) | ● | | 1 | 0 |
| 1 | Philipp Kohlschreiber (GER) | ● | | 1 | 0 |
| 1 | Sebastian Korda (USA) | ● | | 1 | 0 |
| 1 | Tomáš Macháč (CZE) | ● | | 1 | 0 |
| 1 | Adrian Mannarino (FRA) | ● | | 1 | 0 |
| 1 | Maximilian Marterer (GER) | ● | | 1 | 0 |
| 1 | Thiago Monteiro (BRA) | ● | | 1 | 0 |
| 1 | Jaume Munar (ESP) | ● | | 1 | 0 |
| 1 | Lorenzo Musetti (ITA) | ● | | 1 | 0 |
| 1 | Brandon Nakashima (USA) | ● | | 1 | 0 |
| 1 | Oscar Otte (GER) | ● | | 1 | 0 |
| 1 | Mohamed Safwat (EGY) | ● | | 1 | 0 |
| 1 | Pedro Sousa (POR) | ● | | 1 | 0 |
| 1 | Cedrik-Marcel Stebe (GER) | ● | | 1 | 0 |
| 1 | Carlos Taberner (ESP) | ● | | 1 | 0 |
| 1 | Frances Tiafoe (USA) | ● | | 1 | 0 |
| 1 | Mikael Torpegaard (DEN) | ● | | 1 | 0 |
| 1 | Stan Wawrinka (SUI) | ● | | 1 | 0 |
| 1 | Bernabé Zapata Miralles (ESP) | ● | | 1 | 0 |
| 1 | Marcelo Arévalo (ESA) | | ● | 0 | 1 |
| 1 | Grégoire Barrère (FRA) | | ● | 0 | 1 |
| 1 | Benjamin Bonzi (FRA) | | ● | 0 | 1 |
| 1 | Dustin Brown (GER) | | ● | 0 | 1 |
| 1 | Íñigo Cervantes (ESP) | | ● | 0 | 1 |
| 1 | Roberto Cid Subervi (DOM) | | ● | 0 | 1 |
| 1 | Enzo Couacaud (FRA) | | ● | 0 | 1 |
| 1 | Sadio Doumbia (FRA) | | ● | 0 | 1 |
| 1 | Karol Drzewiecki (POL) | | ● | 0 | 1 |
| 1 | Teymuraz Gabashvili (RUS) | | ● | 0 | 1 |
| 1 | Robert Galloway (USA) | | ● | 0 | 1 |
| 1 | Gerard Granollers (ESP) | | ● | 0 | 1 |
| 1 | Manuel Guinard (FRA) | | ● | 0 | 1 |
| 1 | Hans Hach Verdugo (MEX) | | ● | 0 | 1 |
| 1 | Pierre-Hugues Herbert (FRA) | | ● | 0 | 1 |
| 1 | Evan King (USA) | | ● | 0 | 1 |
| 1 | Pavel Kotov (RUS) | | ● | 0 | 1 |
| 1 | Benjamin Lock (ZIM) | | ● | 0 | 1 |
| 1 | Orlando Luz (BRA) | | ● | 0 | 1 |
| 1 | João Menezes (BRA) | | ● | 0 | 1 |
| 1 | Denys Molchanov (UKR) | | ● | 0 | 1 |
| 1 | Andrés Molteni (ARG) | | ● | 0 | 1 |
| 1 | Hugo Nys (MON) | | ● | 0 | 1 |
| 1 | Julian Ocleppo (ITA) | | ● | 0 | 1 |
| 1 | Nathan Pasha (USA) | | ● | 0 | 1 |
| 1 | Andrea Pellegrino (ITA) | | ● | 0 | 1 |
| 1 | Max Purcell (AUS) | | ● | 0 | 1 |
| 1 | Purav Raja (IND) | | ● | 0 | 1 |
| 1 | Ramkumar Ramanathan (IND) | | ● | 0 | 1 |
| 1 | Fabien Reboul (FRA) | | ● | 0 | 1 |
| 1 | Hunter Reese (USA) | | ● | 0 | 1 |
| 1 | Miguel Ángel Reyes-Varela (MEX) | | ● | 0 | 1 |
| 1 | Oriol Roca Batalla (ESP) | | ● | 0 | 1 |
| 1 | Lukáš Rosol (CZE) | | ● | 0 | 1 |
| 1 | Emil Ruusuvuori (FIN) | | ● | 0 | 1 |
| 1 | Antonio Šančić (CRO) | | ● | 0 | 1 |
| 1 | Max Schnur (USA) | | ● | 0 | 1 |
| 1 | Artem Sitak (NZL) | | ● | 0 | 1 |
| 1 | John-Patrick Smith (AUS) | | ● | 0 | 1 |
| 1 | Andrea Vavassori (ITA) | | ● | 0 | 1 |
| 1 | Sem Verbeek (NED) | | ● | 0 | 1 |
| 1 | Mario Vilella Martínez (ESP) | | ● | 0 | 1 |
| 1 | Igor Zelenay (SVK) | | ● | 0 | 1 |
| 1 | Jan Zieliński (POL) | | ● | 0 | 1 |

=== Titles won by nation ===
| Total | Nation | S | D |
|---|---|---|---|
| 21 | United States (USA) | 11 | 10 |
| 11 | France (FRA) | 3 | 8 |
| 10 | Spain (ESP) | 7 | 3 |
| 8 | Germany (GER) | 5 | 3 |
| 6 | Brazil (BRA) | 2 | 4 |
| 6 | Poland (POL) | 1 | 5 |
| 6 | Kazakhstan (KAZ) | 0 | 6 |
| 5 | Argentina (ARG) | 4 | 1 |
| 5 | Russia (RUS) | 3 | 2 |
| 5 | Italy (ITA) | 2 | 3 |
| 5 | Uruguay (URU) | 0 | 5 |
| 4 | Switzerland (SUI) | 3 | 1 |
| 4 | Austria (AUT) | 2 | 2 |
| 4 | Czech Republic (CZE) | 1 | 3 |
| 4 | Portugal (POR) | 1 | 3 |
| 4 | Netherlands (NED) | 0 | 4 |
| 3 | Australia (AUS) | 1 | 2 |
| 3 | Ecuador (ECU) | 0 | 3 |
| 3 | Finland (FIN) | 0 | 3 |
| 3 | Philippines (PHI) | 0 | 3 |
| 2 | Belarus (BLR) | 2 | 0 |
| 2 | Japan (JPN) | 2 | 0 |
| 2 | Bosnia and Herzegovina (BIH) | 0 | 2 |
| 2 | Mexico (MEX) | 0 | 2 |
| 2 | Serbia (SRB) | 0 | 2 |
| 2 | Venezuela (VEN) | 0 | 2 |
| 1 | Colombia (COL) | 1 | 0 |
| 1 | Denmark (DEN) | 1 | 0 |
| 1 | Egypt (EGY) | 1 | 0 |
| 1 | Hungary (HUN) | 1 | 0 |
| 1 | Latvia (LAT) | 1 | 0 |
| 1 | Turkey (TUR) | 1 | 0 |
| 1 | Croatia (CRO) | 0 | 1 |
| 1 | Dominican Republic (DOM) | 0 | 1 |
| 1 | El Salvador (ESA) | 0 | 1 |
| 1 | India (IND) | 0 | 1 |
| 1 | Monaco (MON) | 0 | 1 |
| 1 | New Zealand (NZL) | 0 | 1 |
| 1 | Slovakia (SVK) | 0 | 1 |
| 1 | Ukraine (UKR) | 0 | 1 |
| 1 | Zimbabwe (ZIM) | 0 | 1 |

== Point distribution ==
Points are awarded as follows:

| Tournament Category | Singles | | | | | | | | Doubles | | | | |
| Tournament Category | W | F | SF | QF | R16 | R32 | R48 | Q | W | F | SF | QF | R16 |
|---|---|---|---|---|---|---|---|---|---|---|---|---|---|
| Challenger 125 | 125 | 75 | 45 | 25 | 10 | 5 | 0 | 1 | 125 | 75 | 45 | 25 | 0 |
| Challenger 110 | 110 | 65 | 40 | 20 | 9 | 5 | 0 | 1 | 110 | 65 | 40 | 20 | 0 |
| Challenger 100 | 100 | 60 | 35 | 18 | 8 | 5 | 0 | 1 | 100 | 60 | 35 | 18 | 0 |
| Challenger 90 | 90 | 55 | 33 | 17 | 8 | 5 | 0 | 1 | 90 | 55 | 33 | 17 | 0 |
| Challenger 80 | 80 | 48 | 29 | 15 | 7 | 4 | 0 | 1 | 80 | 48 | 29 | 15 | 0 |
| Challenger 50^{1} | 50 | 30 | 15 | 7 | 4 | 0 | – | 1 | 50 | 30 | 15 | 7 | 0 |

- ^{1} Challenger 50 singles tournaments are only 32-player main draws but involve 24-player qualifying draws
