= 2020 Lima Challenger =

- Date: 23–29 November
- Edition: 14th
- Surface: Clay
- Location: Lima, Peru

Champions

Singles
- (Colombia) Daniel Elahi Galán

Doubles
- (Spain) Íñigo Cervantes / (Spain) Oriol Roca Batalla
← 2019 ·	Lima Challenger	· 2021 →

The 2020 Lima Challenger was a professional tennis tournament played on clay courts. It was the fourteenth edition of the tournament which was part of the 2020 ATP Challenger Tour. It took place in Lima, Peru between 23 and 29 November 2020.

== Singles main-draw entrants ==
=== Seeds ===
Country	Player	Rank^{1}	Seed
ARG	Federico Coria	91	1
ESP	Roberto Carballés Baena	103	2
~~SVK~~	~~Andrej Martin~~	~~105~~	~~3~~
~~ESP~~	~~Jaume Munar~~	~~108~~	~~4~~
POR	Pedro Sousa	112	5
ARG	Facundo Bagnis	124	6
COL	Daniel Elahi Galán	128	7
PER	Juan Pablo Varillas	157	8

- ^{1} Rankings are as of 16 November 2020.

=== Other entrants ===
The following players received wildcards into the singles main draw:

- (Peru) Conner Huertas del Pino
- (Chile) Nicolás Jarry
- (Peru) Jorge Panta

The following player received entry into the singles main draw using a protected ranking:

- (Spain) Íñigo Cervantes

The following player received entry into the singles main draw as a special exempt:

- (Netherlands) Jesper de Jong

The following player received entry into the singles main draw as an alternate:

- (France) Sadio Doumbia

The following players received entry from the qualifying draw:

- (Chile) Gonzalo Lama
- (Brazil) Wilson Leite
- (Ukraine) Vitaliy Sachko
- (Argentina) Thiago Agustín Tirante

The following players received entry as lucky losers:

- (United States) Collin Altamirano
- (Peru) Mauricio Echazú
- (Peru) Sergio Galdós
- (Chile) Bastián Malla

== Champions ==
=== Singles ===
- (Colombia) Daniel Elahi Galán def. (Argentina) Thiago Agustín Tirante 6–1, 3–6, 6–3.

=== Doubles ===
- (Spain) Íñigo Cervantes / (Spain) Oriol Roca Batalla def. (United States) Collin Altamirano / (Ukraine) Vitaliy Sachko 6–3, 6–4.
