= 2020 Internazionali di Tennis del Friuli Venezia Giulia =

- Date: 31 August – 6 September
- Edition: 17th
- Category: ATP Challenger Tour
- Surface: Clay / outdoor
- Location: Cordenons, Italy

Champions

Singles
- (Spain) Bernabé Zapata Miralles

Doubles
- (Uruguay) Ariel Behar / (Kazakhstan) Andrey Golubev
| ← 2019 · | Internazionali di Tennis del Friuli Venezia Giulia | · 2021 → |

The 2020 Internazionali di Tennis del Friuli Venezia Giulia was a professional tennis tournament played on clay courts. It was the 17th edition of the tournament which was part of the 2020 ATP Challenger Tour. It took place in Cordenons, Italy between 31 August and 6 September 2020.

== Singles main-draw entrants ==
=== Seeds ===
| Country | Player | Rank^{1} | Seed |
|---|---|---|---|
| GER | Yannick Hanfmann | 116 | 1 |
| FRA | Antoine Hoang | 127 | 2 |
| GER | Cedrik-Marcel Stebe | 130 | 3 |
| ARG | Facundo Bagnis | 133 | 4 |
| GER | Yannick Maden | 148 | 5 |
| ITA | Lorenzo Giustino | 152 | 6 |
| ITA | Roberto Marcora | 159 | 7 |
| AUT | Jurij Rodionov | 166 | 8 |

- ^{1} Rankings are as of 24 August 2020.

=== Other entrants ===
The following players received wildcards into the singles main draw:

- (Italy) Riccardo Bonadio
- (Italy) Luciano Darderi
- (Italy) Luca Nardi

The following player received entry into the singles main draw using a protected ranking:

- (Germany) Maximilian Marterer

The following players received entry into the singles main draw as special exempts:

- (Spain) Carlos Alcaraz
- (Italy) Lorenzo Musetti

The following players received entry from the qualifying draw:

- (Argentina) Francisco Cerúndolo
- (France) Alexandre Müller
- (Italy) Andrea Pellegrino
- (Italy) Giulio Zeppieri

== Champions ==
=== Singles ===
- (Spain) Bernabé Zapata Miralles def. (Spain) Carlos Alcaraz 6–2, 4–6, 6–2.

=== Doubles ===
- (Uruguay) Ariel Behar / (Kazakhstan) Andrey Golubev def. (Argentina) Andrés Molteni / (Monaco) Hugo Nys 7–5, 6–4.
