= 2020 JC Ferrero Challenger Open =

- Date: 12–18 October
- Edition: 3rd
- Surface: Clay
- Location: Villena, Alicante, Spain
- Venue: Ferrero Tennis Academy

Champions

Singles
- (Spain) Carlos Alcaraz

Doubles
- (France) Enzo Couacaud / (France) Albano Olivetti
- JC Ferrero Challenger Open

The 2020 JC Ferrero Challenger Open was a professional tennis tournament played on clay courts. It was the third edition of the tournament which was part of the 2020 ATP Challenger Tour. It took place at the Ferrero Tennis Academy in Villena, Alicante, Spain, between 12 and 18 October 2020. Carlos Alcaraz was the singles winner; the pair of Enzo Couacaud and Albano Olivetti won doubles.

== Singles main-draw entrants ==
=== Seeds ===
| Country | Player | Rank^{1} | Seed |
|---|---|---|---|
| ESP | Pedro Martínez | 105 | 1 |
| PER | Juan Pablo Varillas | 143 | 2 |
| ESP | Bernabé Zapata Miralles | 145 | 3 |
| ESP | Carlos Taberner | 149 | 4 |
| AUS | Alex Bolt | 151 | 5 |
| COL | Daniel Elahi Galán | 153 | 6 |
| ITA | Lorenzo Giustino | 157 | 7 |
| UZB | Denis Istomin | 169 | 8 |

- ^{1} Rankings are as of 28 September 2020.

=== Other entrants ===
The following players received wildcards into the singles main draw:

- (Spain) Javier Barranco Cosano
- (Spain) Diego Augusto Barreto Sánchez
- (Spain) Pol Martín Tiffon

The following player received entry into the singles main draw using a protected ranking:

- (Spain) Tommy Robredo

The following player received entry into the singles main draw as a special exempt:

- (Spain) Carlos Gimeno Valero

The following players received entry from the qualifying draw:

- (Chile) Marcelo Tomás Barrios Vera
- (United Kingdom) Liam Broady
- (Spain) Íñigo Cervantes
- (Tunisia) Malek Jaziri

The following player received entry as a lucky loser:

- (Spain) Oriol Roca Batalla

== Champions ==
=== Singles ===
- (Spain) Carlos Alcaraz def. (Spain) Pedro Martínez 7–6^{(8–6)}, 6–3.

=== Doubles ===
- (France) Enzo Couacaud / (France) Albano Olivetti def. (Spain) Íñigo Cervantes / (Spain) Oriol Roca Batalla 4–6, 6–4, [10–2].
