= 2020 Monterrey Challenger =

- Date: 2–8 March
- Edition: 11th
- Draw: 48S / 16D
- Surface: Hard
- Location: Monterrey, Mexico

Champions

Singles
- (France) Adrian Mannarino

Doubles
- (Poland) Karol Drzewiecki / (Portugal) Gonçalo Oliveira
- Monterrey Challenger

The 2020 Monterrey Challenger was a professional tennis tournament played on hard courts. It was the eleventh edition of the tournament which was part of the 2020 ATP Challenger Tour. It took place in Monterrey, Mexico from 2 to 8 March 2020.

== Singles main-draw entrants ==
=== Seeds ===
Country	Player	Rank^{1}	Seed
FRA	Adrian Mannarino	42	1
ESP	Feliciano López	52	2
ESP	Pablo Andújar	54	3
LTU	Ričardas Berankis	62	4
ARG	Federico Coria	104	5
TPE	Jason Jung	119	6
ITA	Paolo Lorenzi	121	7
ITA	Federico Gaio	126	8
ITA	Lorenzo Giustino	153	9
CAN	Steven Diez	159	10
SRB	Viktor Troicki	174	11
CAN	Brayden Schnur	178	12
AUS	Andrew Harris	188	13
CAN	Peter Polansky	189	14
AUS	Bernard Tomic	201	15
USA	Ernesto Escobedo	202	16

- ^{1} Rankings are as of 24 February 2020.

=== Other entrants ===
The following players received wildcards into the singles main draw:

- (United States) Milledge Cossu
- (Mexico) Alex Hernández
- (France) Adrian Mannarino
- (Japan) Shintaro Mochizuki
- (Mexico) Luis Patiño

The following players received entry from the qualifying draw:

- (Italy) Liam Caruana
- (Spain) Carlos Gómez-Herrera

== Champions ==
=== Singles ===
- (France) Adrian Mannarino def. (Australia) Aleksandar Vukic 6–1, 6–3.

=== Doubles ===
- (Poland) Karol Drzewiecki / (Portugal) Gonçalo Oliveira def. (Brazil) Orlando Luz / (Brazil) Rafael Matos 6–7^{(5–7)}, 6–4, [11–9].
