= Olímpia Tennis Classic =

- 2020 Olímpia Tennis Classic

ATP Challenger Tour
- Event name: Olímpia Tennis Classic
- Location: Olímpia, Brazil
- Category: ATP Challenger Tour
- Surface: Clay
- Draw: 32S/24Q/16D

The Olímpia Tennis Classic is a professional tennis tournament played on clay courts. It is currently part of the ATP Challenger Tour. It is held annually in Olímpia, Brazil since 2020.

== Past finals ==
=== Singles ===
Year	Champion	Runner-up	Score
2020	canceled due to coronavirus pandemic		

=== Doubles ===
Year	Champions	Runners-up	Score
2020	canceled due to coronavirus pandemic		
