= 2020 Bengaluru Open =

- Date: 10–16 February
- Edition: 4th
- Draw: 48S / 16D
- Surface: Hard
- Location: Bangalore, India

Champions

Singles
- (Australia) James Duckworth

Doubles
- (India) Purav Raja / (India) Ramkumar Ramanathan
- Bengaluru Open

The 2020 Bengaluru Open was a professional tennis tournament played on hard courts. It was the fourth edition of the tournament which was part of the 2020 ATP Challenger Tour. It took place in Bangalore, India from 10 to 16 February 2020.

== Singles main-draw entrants ==
=== Seeds ===
Country	Player	Rank^{1}	Seed
~~LTU~~	~~Ričardas Berankis~~	~~73~~	~~1~~
ITA	Stefano Travaglia	82	2
JPN	Yūichi Sugita	86	3
AUS	James Duckworth	96	4
~~CZE~~	~~Jiří Veselý~~	~~107~~	~~5~~
RUS	Evgeny Donskoy	109	6
IND	Prajnesh Gunneswaran	122	7
IND	Sumit Nagal	125	8
ITA	Thomas Fabbiano	134	9
CHN	Zhang Zhizhen	137	10
SLO	Blaž Rola	145	11
SRB	Nikola Milojević	148	12
BLR	Ilya Ivashka	152	13
EGY	Mohamed Safwat	157	14
BEL	Kimmer Coppejans	162	15
CZE	Lukáš Rosol	176	16
IND	Ramkumar Ramanathan	182	17

- ^{1} Rankings are as of 3 February 2020.

=== Other entrants ===
The following players received wildcards into the singles main draw:

- (India) S D Prajwal Dev
- (India) Arjun Kadhe
- (India) Niki Kaliyanda Poonacha
- (India) Adil Kalyanpur
- (India) Suraj Prabodh

The following players received entry into the singles main draw as alternates:

- (Germany) Sebastian Fanselow
- (India) Manish Sureshkumar

The following players received entry from the qualifying draw:

- (India) Anirudh Chandrasekar
- (India) Abhinav Sanjeev Shanmugam

The following player received entry as a lucky loser:

- (India) Rishi Reddy

== Champions ==
=== Singles ===
- (Australia) James Duckworth def. (France) Benjamin Bonzi 6–4, 6–4.

=== Doubles ===
- (India) Purav Raja / (India) Ramkumar Ramanathan def. (Australia) Matthew Ebden / (India) Leander Paes 6–0, 6–3.
