= 2020 Olímpia Tennis Classic =

- Date: 17–22 March
- Edition: 1st
- Surface: Clay
- Location: Olímpia, Brazil

Champions

Singles
- No champion

Doubles
- No champions
Olímpia Tennis Classic	· 2021 →

The 2020 Olímpia Tennis Classic was a professional tennis tournament played on clay courts. It would be the first edition of the tournament which was part of the 2020 ATP Challenger Tour. It was scheduled to take place in Olímpia, Brazil between 17 and 22 March 2020. The tournament was canceled due to the coronavirus pandemic.
