= 2020 RBC Tennis Championships of Dallas =

- Date: 3–9 February
- Edition: 23rd
- Draw: 48S / 16D
- Surface: Hard (indoor)
- Location: Dallas, United States

Champions

Singles
- (Austria) Jurij Rodionov

Doubles
- (United States) Dennis Novikov / (Portugal) Gonçalo Oliveira
- RBC Tennis Championships of Dallas

The 2020 RBC Tennis Championships of Dallas was a professional tennis tournament played on hard courts. It was the 23rd edition of the tournament and part of the 2020 ATP Challenger Tour. It took place in Dallas, United States between 3 and 9 February 2020.

== Singles main-draw entrants ==
=== Seeds ===
Country	Player	Rank^{1}	Seed
USA	Frances Tiafoe	50	1
ITA	Andreas Seppi	85	2
GER	Dominik Koepfer	89	3
CAN	Brayden Schnur	103	4
USA	Denis Kudla	108	5
AUS	Christopher O'Connell	115	6
TPE	Jason Jung	126	7
USA	Mackenzie McDonald	129	8
USA	Bradley Klahn	132	9
ECU	Emilio Gómez	148	10
AUT	Sebastian Ofner	157	11
USA	Mitchell Krueger	164	12
UZB	Denis Istomin	170	13
CAN	Peter Polansky	180	14
USA	J. J. Wolf	181	15
AUS	Bernard Tomic	183	16

- ^{1} Rankings are as of January 20, 2020.

=== Other entrants ===
The following players received wildcards into the singles main draw:

- (United States) Nick Chappell
- (United States) Aleksandar Kovacevic
- (United States) Michael Redlicki
- (United States) Frances Tiafoe
- (United States) Evan Zhu

The following player received entry into the singles main draw as a special exempt:

- (Colombia) Daniel Elahi Galán

The following players received entry from the qualifying draw:

- (United States) Dennis Novikov
- (United States) Hunter Reese

== Champions ==
=== Singles ===
- (Austria) Jurij Rodionov def. (United States) Denis Kudla 7–5, 7–6^{(12–10)}.

=== Doubles ===
- (United States) Dennis Novikov / (Portugal) Gonçalo Oliveira def. (Venezuela) Luis David Martínez / (Mexico) Miguel Ángel Reyes-Varela 6–3, 6–4.
