= 2020 JC Ferrero Challenger Open – Singles =

Singles
- 2020 JC Ferrero Challenger Open

Final
- Champion: (Spain) Carlos Alcaraz
- Runner-up: (Spain) Pedro Martínez
- Score: 7–6^{(8–6)}, 6–3

Events
| Singles | Doubles |
- JC Ferrero Challenger Open

Pablo Andújar was the defending champion but chose not to defend his title.

Carlos Alcaraz won the title after defeating Pedro Martínez 7–6^{(8–6)}, 6–3 in the final.

== Seeds ==
1. (Spain) Pedro Martínez (final)
2. (Peru) Juan Pablo Varillas (first round)
3. (Spain) Bernabé Zapata Miralles (semifinals)
4. (Spain) Carlos Taberner (first round)
5. (Australia) Alex Bolt (first round)
6. (Colombia) Daniel Elahi Galán (second round)
7. (Italy) Lorenzo Giustino (first round)
8. (Uzbekistan) Denis Istomin (first round)

== Draw ==
Key

- Q = Qualifier
- WC = Wild card
- LL = Lucky loser
- Alt = Alternate
- ITF = ITF entry
- PR = Protected ranking
- SR = Special ranking
- SE = Special exempt
- JE = Junior exempt
- JR = Junior Accelerator Programme entrant
- CO = College Accelerator Programme entrant
- NG = Next Gen Accelerator Program entrant
- w/o = Walkover
- r = Retired
- d = Defaulted

=== Finals ===
Semifinals
1 | (Spain) Pedro Martínez | 6 | 2 | 6
3 | (Spain) Bernabé Zapata Miralles | 4 | 6 | 3
(Spain) Carlos Alcaraz | 1 | 6 | 6
(Spain) Mario Vilella Martínez | 6 | 3 | 4

Final
1 | (Spain) Pedro Martínez | 6^{6} | 3
(Spain) Carlos Alcaraz | 7^{8} | 6

=== Top half ===
First round
1 | (Spain) P Martínez | 6 | 3
(Argentina) M Trungelliti | 4 | 0^{r}
(United States) B Nakashima | 4 | 3
(Spain) G García López | 6 | 6
(Czech Republic) T Macháč | 6 | 6
(Canada) P Polansky | 1 | 1
Q | (United Kingdom) L Broady | 7 | 6
7 | (Italy) L Giustino | 5 | 3
3 | (Spain) B Zapata Miralles | 7 | 6
SE | (Spain) C Gimeno Valero | 5 | 2
WC | (Spain) J Barranco Cosano | 5 | 6 | 6^{4}
WC | (Spain) P Martín Tiffon | 7 | 2 | 7^{7}
(France) E Couacaud | 2 | 1
(Australia) A Vukic | 6 | 6
Q | (Spain) Í Cervantes | 1 | 7 | 6
5 | (Australia) A Bolt | 6 | 5 | 3

Second round
1 | (Spain) P Martínez | 6 | 6
(Spain) G García López | 4 | 0
(Czech Republic) T Macháč | 6 | 6
Q | (United Kingdom) L Broady | 3 | 2
3 | (Spain) B Zapata Miralles | 6 | 7
WC | (Spain) P Martín Tiffon | 3 | 5
(Australia) A Vukic | 6 | 6
Q | (Spain) Í Cervantes | 1 | 1

Quarterfinals
1 | (Spain) P Martínez | 6 | 1 | 6
(Czech Republic) T Macháč | 4 | 6 | 2
3 | (Spain) B Zapata Miralles | 6 | 4 | 6
(Australia) A Vukic | 1 | 6 | 1

Semifinals
1 | (Spain) P Martínez | 6 | 2 | 6
3 | (Spain) B Zapata Miralles | 4 | 6 | 3

=== Bottom half ===
First round
6 | (Colombia) DE Galán | 6 | 6
(Argentina) A Collarini | 4 | 3
(India) R Ramanathan | 6^{4} | 6^{3}
(Spain) C Alcaraz | 7^{7} | 7^{7}
PR | (Spain) T Robredo | 3 | 3
Q | (Chile) MT Barrios Vera | 6 | 6
(Argentina) JP Ficovich | 7^{7} | 6
4 | (Spain) C Taberner | 6^{5} | 3
8 | (Uzbekistan) D Istomin | 6^{5} | 3
(Spain) N Kuhn | 7^{7} | 6
LL | (Spain) O Roca Batalla | 1 | 5
(Canada) S Diez | 6 | 7
WC | (Spain) Diego Augusto Barreto Sánchez | 3 | 2
(Spain) M Vilella Martínez | 6 | 6
Q | (Tunisia) M Jaziri | 2 | 6 | 6
2 | (Peru) JP Varillas | 6 | 1 | 4

Second round
6 | (Colombia) DE Galán | 1 | 6 | 3
(Spain) C Alcaraz | 6 | 3 | 6
Q | (Chile) MT Barrios Vera | 3 | 0
(Argentina) JP Ficovich | 6 | 6
(Spain) N Kuhn | 1 | 2
(Canada) S Diez | 6 | 6
(Spain) M Vilella Martínez | 6 | 6
Q | (Tunisia) M Jaziri | 3 | 2

Quarterfinals
(Spain) C Alcaraz | 3 | 6 | 6
(Argentina) JP Ficovich | 6 | 4 | 2
(Canada) S Diez | 3 | 2
(Spain) M Vilella Martínez | 6 | 6

Semifinals
(Spain) C Alcaraz | 1 | 6 | 6
(Spain) M Vilella Martínez | 6 | 3 | 4
