= 2020 Bengaluru Open – Doubles =

Doubles
- 2020 Bengaluru Open

Final
- Champions: (India) Purav Raja (India) Ramkumar Ramanathan
- Runners-up: (Australia) Matthew Ebden (India) Leander Paes
- Score: 6–0, 6–3

Events
Singles	Doubles
- Bengaluru Open

Max Purcell and Luke Saville were the defending champions but chose not to defend their title.

The Indian duo of Purav Raja and Ramkumar Ramanathan won the title after defeating Matthew Ebden and Leander Paes 6–0, 6–3 in the final.

== Seeds ==
1. (Chinese Taipei) Hsieh Cheng-peng / (Ukraine) Denys Molchanov (quarterfinals)
2. (Israel) Jonathan Erlich / (Belarus) Andrei Vasilevski (semifinals)
3. (Sweden) André Göransson / (Indonesia) Christopher Rungkat (quarterfinals)
4. (India) Purav Raja / (India) Ramkumar Ramanathan (champions)

== Draw ==
Key

- Q = Qualifier
- WC = Wild card
- LL = Lucky loser
- Alt = Alternate
- ITF = ITF entry
- PR = Protected ranking
- SR = Special ranking
- SE = Special exempt
- JE = Junior exempt
- JR = Junior Accelerator Programme entrant
- CO = College Accelerator Programme entrant
- NG = Next Gen Accelerator Program entrant
- w/o = Walkover
- r = Retired
- d = Defaulted

First round
1	(Chinese Taipei) C-p Hsieh (Ukraine) D Molchanov	6	7^{8}
WC	(India) VS Prashanth (India) V Vardhan	3	6^{6}
(India) S Myneni (Australia) M Reid	6	6
WC	(India) Nikshep Ballekere Ravikumar (India) Vasisht Cheruku	3	1
4	(India) P Raja (India) R Ramanathan	6	6
WC	(India) SDP Dev (India) A Kalyanpur	2	2
(Portugal) F Ferreira Silva (Serbia) N Milojević	6^{1}	7	[10]
(India) S Balaji (India) J Nedunchezhiyan	7^{7}	5	[8]
(Australia) M Ebden (India) L Paes	7^{7}	6
(Slovenia) B Rola (China) Zh Zhang	6^{2}	4
(India) P Gunneswaran (India) S Nagal	3	4
3	(Sweden) A Göransson (Indonesia) C Rungkat	6	6
(Germany) A Begemann (Germany) D Masur	2	3
(Czech Republic) L Rosol (Japan) Y Sugita	6	6
(Monaco) R Arneodo (France) B Bonzi	6	0	[7]
2	(Israel) J Erlich (Belarus) A Vasilevski	4	6	[10]

Quarterfinals
1	(Chinese Taipei) C-p Hsieh (Ukraine) D Molchanov	6	4	[8]
(India) S Myneni (Australia) M Reid	3	6	[10]
4	(India) P Raja (India) R Ramanathan	6	6
(Portugal) F Ferreira Silva (Serbia) N Milojević	4	4
(Australia) M Ebden (India) L Paes	7	0	[10]
3	(Sweden) A Göransson (Indonesia) C Rungkat	5	6	[7]
(Czech Republic) L Rosol (Japan) Y Sugita	3	6	[5]
2	(Israel) J Erlich (Belarus) A Vasilevski	6	3	[10]

Semifinals
(India) S Myneni (Australia) M Reid	5	0^{r}
4	(India) P Raja (India) R Ramanathan	7	0
(Australia) M Ebden (India) L Paes	6	3	[10]
2	(Israel) J Erlich (Belarus) A Vasilevski	4	6	[7]

Final
4	(India) P Raja (India) R Ramanathan	6	6
(Australia) M Ebden (India) L Paes	0	3
