= 2020 RBC Tennis Championships of Dallas – Doubles =

Doubles
- 2020 RBC Tennis Championships of Dallas

Final
- Champions: (United States) Dennis Novikov (Portugal) Gonçalo Oliveira
- Runners-up: (Venezuela) Luis David Martínez (Mexico) Miguel Ángel Reyes-Varela
- Score: 6–3, 6–4

Events
Singles	Doubles
- RBC Tennis Championships of Dallas

Marcos Giron and Dennis Novikov were the defending champions but only Novikov chose to defend his title, partnering Gonçalo Oliveira.

Novikov successfully defended his title after defeating Luis David Martínez and Miguel Ángel Reyes-Varela 6–3, 6–4 in the final.

== Seeds ==
1. (United Kingdom) Luke Bambridge / (Japan) Ben McLachlan (quarterfinals)
2. (Croatia) Antonio Šančić / (Austria) Tristan-Samuel Weissborn (first round)
3. (Venezuela) Luis David Martínez / (Mexico) Miguel Ángel Reyes-Varela (final)
4. (United States) Robert Galloway / (Mexico) Hans Hach Verdugo (first round)

== Draw ==
Key

- Q = Qualifier
- WC = Wild card
- LL = Lucky loser
- Alt = Alternate
- ITF = ITF entry
- PR = Protected ranking
- SR = Special ranking
- SE = Special exempt
- JE = Junior exempt
- JR = Junior Accelerator Programme entrant
- CO = College Accelerator Programme entrant
- NG = Next Gen Accelerator Program entrant
- w/o = Walkover
- r = Retired
- d = Defaulted

First round
1	(United Kingdom) L Bambridge (Japan) B McLachlan	7	6
(United States) J Cerretani (United States) M Cressy	5	2
(Philippines) R Gonzales (United States) H Reese	3	5
WC	(United Kingdom) L Glasspool (United States) A Lawson	6	7
3	(Venezuela) LD Martínez (Mexico) MÁ Reyes-Varela	6	6
WC	(Bolivia) B Arias (United States) S Bangoura	4	2
PR	(United States) C Harrison (United States) R Harrison	6^{5}	6	[10]
(Brazil) T Bellucci (Brazil) J Menezes	7^{7}	4	[8]
(Kazakhstan) D Popko (Chile) A Tabilo	6	2	[7]
(United States) D Novikov (Portugal) G Oliveira	4	6	[10]
(Chinese Taipei) J Jung (Germany) D Koepfer	7^{7}	6
4	(United States) R Galloway (Mexico) H Hach Verdugo	6^{3}	1
(Austria) S Ofner (South Africa) R Roelofse	6^{2}	4
(Canada) P Polansky (Canada) B Schnur	7^{7}	6
WC	(United States) C Eubanks (United States) S Korda	1	6	[10]
2	(Croatia) A Šančić (Austria) T-S Weissborn	6	4	[7]

Quarterfinals
1	(United Kingdom) L Bambridge (Japan) B McLachlan	6	6^{9}	[10]
WC	(United Kingdom) L Glasspool (United States) A Lawson	4	7^{11}	[12]
3	(Venezuela) LD Martínez (Mexico) MÁ Reyes-Varela	6	6
PR	(United States) C Harrison (United States) R Harrison	2	4
(United States) D Novikov (Portugal) G Oliveira	w/o
(Chinese Taipei) J Jung (Germany) D Koepfer
(Canada) P Polansky (Canada) B Schnur	6	6
WC	(United States) C Eubanks (United States) S Korda	4	2

Semifinals
WC	(United Kingdom) L Glasspool (United States) A Lawson	6^{3}	7^{7}	[6]
3	(Venezuela) LD Martínez (Mexico) MÁ Reyes-Varela	7^{7}	6^{1}	[10]
(United States) D Novikov (Portugal) G Oliveira	7	6
(Canada) P Polansky (Canada) B Schnur	5	3

Final
3	(Venezuela) LD Martínez (Mexico) MÁ Reyes-Varela	3	4
(United States) D Novikov (Portugal) G Oliveira	6	6
