= 2020 RBC Tennis Championships of Dallas – Singles =

Singles
- 2020 RBC Tennis Championships of Dallas

Final
- Champion: (Austria) Jurij Rodionov
- Runner-up: (United States) Denis Kudla
- Score: 7–5, 7–6^{(12–10)}

Events
Singles	Doubles
- RBC Tennis Championships of Dallas

Mitchell Krueger was the defending champion but lost in the third round to Denis Kudla.

Jurij Rodionov won the title after defeating Kudla 7–5, 7–6^{(12–10)} in the final.

== Seeds ==
All seeds receive a bye into the second round.

1. (United States) Frances Tiafoe (quarterfinals)
2. (Italy) Andreas Seppi (second round)
3. (Germany) Dominik Koepfer (semifinals)
4. (Canada) Brayden Schnur (second round)
5. (United States) Denis Kudla (final)
6. (Australia) Christopher O'Connell (second round)
7. (Chinese Taipei) Jason Jung (third round)
8. (United States) Mackenzie McDonald (quarterfinals)
9. (United States) Bradley Klahn (third round)
10. (Ecuador) Emilio Gómez (semifinals)
11. (Austria) Sebastian Ofner (third round)
12. (United States) Mitchell Krueger (third round)
13. (Uzbekistan) Denis Istomin (third round)
14. (Canada) Peter Polansky (second round)
15. (United States) J. J. Wolf (quarterfinals)
16. (Australia) Bernard Tomic (second round)

== Draw ==
Key

- Q = Qualifier
- WC = Wild card
- LL = Lucky loser
- Alt = Alternate
- ITF = ITF entry
- PR = Protected ranking
- SR = Special ranking
- SE = Special exempt
- JE = Junior exempt
- JR = Junior Accelerator Programme entrant
- CO = College Accelerator Programme entrant
- NG = Next Gen Accelerator Program entrant
- w/o = Walkover
- r = Retired
- d = Defaulted

=== Finals ===
Quarterfinals
1/WC	(United States) Frances Tiafoe	4	6^{6}
5	(United States) Denis Kudla	6	7^{8}
15	(United States) J. J. Wolf	6^{8}	6^{6}
10	(Ecuador) Emilio Gómez	7^{10}	7^{8}
8	(United States) Mackenzie McDonald	7	3	2
3	(Germany) Dominik Koepfer	5	6	6
(Brazil) João Menezes	4	4
(Austria) Jurij Rodionov	6	6

Semifinals
5	(United States) Denis Kudla	6	6
10	(Ecuador) Emilio Gómez	4	4
3	(Germany) Dominik Koepfer	6^{7}	2
(Austria) Jurij Rodionov	7^{9}	6

Final
5	(United States) Denis Kudla	5	6^{10}
(Austria) Jurij Rodionov	7	7^{12}

=== Top half ===
==== Section 1 ====
First round
(Australia) A Vukic	7	6
(United States) N Rubin	5	2
(United States) R Harrison	3	4
(United States) B Nakashima	6	6
(Brazil) T Bellucci	1	6	7^{7}
(United States) C Eubanks	6	2	6^{2}
WC	(United States) Mi Redlicki	6	6
Q	(United States) D Novikov	4	3

Second round
1/WC	(United States) F Tiafoe	4	7^{9}	6
(Australia) A Vukic	6	6^{7}	4
(United States) B Nakashima	6	6
16	(Australia) B Tomic	2	3
12	(United States) M Krueger	6^{7}	6	7^{11}
(Brazil) T Bellucci	7^{9}	4	6^{9}
WC	(United States) Mi Redlicki	2	6^{2}
5	(United States) D Kudla	6	7^{7}

Third round
1/WC	(United States) F Tiafoe	3	7^{7}	7
(United States) B Nakashima	6	6^{2}	5
12	(United States) M Krueger	6	3	4
5	(United States) D Kudla	4	6	6

Quarterfinals
1/WC	(United States) F Tiafoe	4	6^{6}
5	(United States) D Kudla	6	7^{8}

==== Section 2 ====
First round
(Japan) Yo Watanuki	6	7
(United States) S Korda	3	5
(United States) E Escobedo	6	6
(Portugal) G Oliveira	2	3
(United States) M Cressy	7^{7}	6
(Japan) K Uchida	6^{5}	4
(Kazakhstan) D Popko	5	3
(United States) K King	7	6

Second round
4	(Canada) B Schnur	2	4
(Japan) Yo Watanuki	6	6
(United States) E Escobedo	6^{7}	3
15	(United States) J. J. Wolf	7^{9}	6
10	(Ecuador) E Gómez	6	4	6
(United States) M Cressy	3	6	3
(United States) K King	6^{4}	4
7	(Chinese Taipei) J Jung	7^{7}	6

Third round
(Japan) Yo Watanuki	4	5
15	(United States) J. J. Wolf	6	7
10	(Ecuador) E Gómez	4	6	7^{8}
7	(Chinese Taipei) J Jung	6	4	6^{6}

Quarterfinals
15	(United States) J. J. Wolf	6^{8}	6^{6}
10	(Ecuador) E Gómez	7^{10}	7^{8}

=== Bottom half ===
==== Section 3 ====
First round
(United States) S Kozlov	2	2
(United States) D Young	6	6
WC	(United States) E Zhu	4	3
(United States) U Blanch	6	6
(Chile) A Tabilo	6	6
(Denmark) M Torpegaard	4	3
SE	(Colombia) DE Galán	7	3	2
(United States) S Bangoura	5	6	6

Second round
8	(United States) M McDonald	6	1	6
(United States) D Young	4	6	4
(United States) U Blanch	3	4
11	(Austria) S Ofner	6	6
13	(Uzbekistan) D Istomin	6	4	7^{7}
(Chile) A Tabilo	2	6	6^{2}
(United States) S Bangoura	4	6^{5}
3	(Germany) D Koepfer	6	7^{7}

Third round
8	(United States) M McDonald	6	6
11	(Austria) S Ofner	3	4
13	(Uzbekistan) D Istomin	6^{4}	3
3	(Germany) D Koepfer	7^{7}	6

Quarterfinals
8	(United States) M McDonald	7	3	2
3	(Germany) D Koepfer	5	6	6

==== Section 4 ====
First round
(Brazil) J Menezes	6^{6}	6	6
WC	(United States) N Chappell	7^{8}	3	1
Q	(United States) H Reese	6^{3}	5
(Ecuador) R Quiroz	7^{7}	7
(United States) M Mmoh	7^{7}	7^{9}
WC	(United States) A Kovacevic	6^{2}	6^{7}
(Dominican Republic) R Cid Subervi	6^{5}	3
(Austria) J Rodionov	7^{7}	6

Second round
6	(Australia) C O'Connell	6	4	6^{7}
(Brazil) J Menezes	3	6	7^{9}
(Ecuador) R Quiroz	6^{6}	4
9	(United States) B Klahn	7^{8}	6
14	(Canada) P Polansky	3	2
(United States) M Mmoh	6	6
(Austria) J Rodionov	6	6
2	(Italy) A Seppi	3	4

Third round
(Brazil) J Menezes	3	7^{8}	7^{7}
9	(United States) B Klahn	6	6^{6}	6^{5}
(United States) M Mmoh	7^{7}	2	1
(Austria) J Rodionov	6^{4}	6	6

Quarterfinals
(Brazil) J Menezes	4	4
(Austria) J Rodionov	6	6
