= 2019 Lima Challenger =

- Date: 21 October – 27 October
- Edition: 13th
- Surface: Clay
- Location: Lima, Peru

Champions

Singles
- (Brazil) Thiago Monteiro

Doubles
- (Uruguay) Ariel Behar / (Ecuador) Gonzalo Escobar
- Lima Challenger

The 2019 Lima Challenger was a professional tennis tournament played on clay courts. It was the thirteenth edition of the tournament which was part of the 2019 ATP Challenger Tour. It took place in Lima, Peru between October 21 and October 27, 2019.

== Singles main-draw entrants ==
=== Seeds ===
Country	Player	Rank^{1}	Seed
ITA	Marco Cecchinato	73	1
ARG	Leonardo Mayer	96	2
BRA	Thiago Monteiro	100	3
SVK	Andrej Martin	114	4
POR	Pedro Sousa	115	5
IND	Sumit Nagal	128	6
ARG	Federico Coria	130	7
ARG	Facundo Bagnis	144	8
ITA	Lorenzo Giustino	145	9
PER	Juan Pablo Varillas	161	10
ESP	Mario Vilella Martínez	178	11
POR	João Domingues	185	12
GER	Yannick Hanfmann	192	13
ARG	Facundo Mena	196	14
BRA	João Menezes	197	15
ARG	Andrea Collarini	198	16

- ^{1} Rankings are as of 14 October 2019.

=== Other entrants ===
The following players received wildcards into the singles main draw:

- (Peru) Mauricio Echazú
- (Peru) Arklon Huertas del Pino
- (Peru) Conner Huertas del Pino
- (Peru) Pedro Iamachkine
- (Peru) Jorge Panta

The following player received entry into the singles main draw using a protected ranking:

- (Spain) Íñigo Cervantes

The following player received entry into the singles main draw as an alternate:

- (Argentina) Camilo Ugo Carabelli

The following players received entry from the qualifying draw:

- (Colombia) Alejandro González
- (Brazil) Rafael Matos

== Champions ==
=== Singles ===
- (Brazil) Thiago Monteiro def. (Argentina) Federico Coria 6–2, 6–7^{(7–9)}, 6–4.

=== Doubles ===
- (Uruguay) Ariel Behar / (Ecuador) Gonzalo Escobar def. (Venezuela) Luis David Martínez / (Brazil) Felipe Meligeni Alves 6–2, 2–6, [10–3].
