= 2020 Internazionali di Tennis del Friuli Venezia Giulia – Singles =

Singles
- 2020 Internazionali di Tennis del Friuli Venezia Giulia

Final
- Champion: (Spain) Bernabé Zapata Miralles
- Runner-up: (Spain) Carlos Alcaraz
- Score: 6–2, 4–6, 6–2

Events
Singles	Doubles
← 2019 ·	Internazionali di Tennis del Friuli Venezia Giulia	· 2021 →

Christopher O'Connell was the defending champion but chose not to defend his title.

Bernabé Zapata Miralles won the title after defeating Carlos Alcaraz 6–2, 4–6, 6–2 in the final.

== Seeds ==
1. (Germany) Yannick Hanfmann (first round)
2. (France) Antoine Hoang (first round)
3. (Germany) Cedrik-Marcel Stebe (second round)
4. (Argentina) Facundo Bagnis (quarterfinals)
5. (Germany) Yannick Maden (first round)
6. (Italy) Lorenzo Giustino (first round)
7. (Italy) Roberto Marcora (first round)
8. (Austria) Jurij Rodionov (first round)

== Draw ==
=== Key ===
- Q = Qualifier
- WC = Wild card
- LL = Lucky loser
- Alt = Alternate
- SE = Special exempt
- PR = Protected ranking
- ITF = ITF entry
- JE = Junior exempt
- w/o = Walkover
- r = Retired
- d = Defaulted
- SR = Special ranking

=== Finals ===
Semifinals
(Spain) Bernabé Zapata Miralles	6	6
(Chile) Alejandro Tabilo	1	0
SE	(Spain) Carlos Alcaraz	6	7^{8}
(Germany) Daniel Altmaier	1	6^{6}

Final
(Spain) Bernabé Zapata Miralles	6	4	6
SE	(Spain) Carlos Alcaraz	2	6	2

=== Top half ===
First round
1	(Germany) Y Hanfmann	7^{7}	4	4
(Spain) B Zapata Miralles	6^{5}	6	6
Q	(France) A Müller	4	6	6
Q	(Italy) A Pellegrino	6	2	3
(Argentina) A Collarini	6	6
(Italy) M Viola	0	1
(Spain) M Vilella Martínez	6	2	6
6	(Italy) L Giustino	4	6	4
3	(Germany) C-M Stebe	7^{8}	6
WC	(Italy) L Nardi	6^{6}	3
(Dominican Republic) R Cid Subervi	3	4
(Chile) A Tabilo	6	6
PR	(Germany) M Marterer	6	1	6
(Brazil) J Menezes	1	6	3
WC	(Italy) R Bonadio	6	7^{7}
8	(Austria) J Rodionov	3	6^{1}

Second round
(Spain) B Zapata Miralles	6	7
Q	(France) A Müller	1	5
(Argentina) A Collarini	6	6
(Spain) M Vilella Martínez	2	4
3	(Germany) C-M Stebe	7	4	2
(Chile) A Tabilo	5	6	6
PR	(Germany) M Marterer	4	6^{6}
WC	(Italy) R Bonadio	6	7^{8}

Quarterfinals
(Spain) B Zapata Miralles	7^{7}	3
(Argentina) A Collarini	6^{2}	2^{r}
(Chile) A Tabilo	7	6
WC	(Italy) R Bonadio	5	1

Semifinals
(Spain) B Zapata Miralles	6	6
(Chile) A Tabilo	1	0

=== Bottom half ===
First round
7	(Italy) R Marcora	5	4
(France) B Bonzi	7	6
SE	(Spain) C Alcaraz	4	6	7
(Argentina) JP Ficovich	6	3	5
Q	(Italy) G Zeppieri	2	3
(United Kingdom) L Broady	6	6
(France) Q Halys	7^{10}	2	2
4	(Argentina) F Bagnis	6^{8}	6	6
5	(Germany) Y Maden	1	0
SE	(Italy) L Musetti	6	6
(France) M Janvier	4	4
Q	(Argentina) F Cerúndolo	6	6
(Spain) T Robredo	1	6	6^{2}
(Germany) D Altmaier	6	3	7^{7}
WC	(Italy) L Darderi	6	6^{5}	6
2	(France) A Hoang	2	7^{7}	4

Second round
(France) B Bonzi	3	6^{3}
SE	(Spain) C Alcaraz	6	7^{7}
(United Kingdom) L Broady	3	6^{4}
4	(Argentina) F Bagnis	6	7^{7}
SE	(Italy) L Musetti	6	6
Q	(Argentina) F Cerúndolo	3	0
(Germany) D Altmaier	6	6
WC	(Italy) L Darderi	4	2

Quarterfinals
SE	(Spain) C Alcaraz	7^{7}	4	6
4	(Argentina) F Bagnis	6^{5}	6	2
SE	(Italy) L Musetti	6^{4}	2
(Germany) D Altmaier	7^{7}	6

Semifinals
SE	(Spain) C Alcaraz	6	7^{8}
(Germany) D Altmaier	1	6^{6}
