= 2020 Monterrey Challenger – Singles =

Singles
- 2020 Monterrey Challenger

Final
- Champion: (France) Adrian Mannarino
- Runner-up: (Australia) Aleksandar Vukic
- Score: 6–1, 6–3

Events
Singles	Doubles
- Monterrey Challenger

Alexander Bublik was the defending champion but chose not to defend his title.

Adrian Mannarino won the title after defeating Aleksandar Vukic 6–1, 6–3 in the final.

== Seeds ==
All seeds receive a bye into the second round.

1. (France) Adrian Mannarino (champion)
2. (Spain) Feliciano López (second round)
3. (Spain) Pablo Andújar (quarterfinals)
4. (Lithuania) Ričardas Berankis (third round)
5. (Argentina) Federico Coria (second round)
6. (Chinese Taipei) Jason Jung (quarterfinals)
7. (Italy) Paolo Lorenzi (third round)
8. (Italy) Federico Gaio (second round)
9. (Italy) Lorenzo Giustino (third round)
10. (Canada) Steven Diez (second round)
11. (Serbia) Viktor Troicki (second round)
12. (Canada) Brayden Schnur (second round)
13. (Australia) Andrew Harris (third round)
14. (Canada) Peter Polansky (third round)
15. (Australia) Bernard Tomic (third round)
16. (United States) Ernesto Escobedo (semifinals)

== Draw ==
Key

- Q = Qualifier
- WC = Wild card
- LL = Lucky loser
- Alt = Alternate
- ITF = ITF entry
- PR = Protected ranking
- SR = Special ranking
- SE = Special exempt
- JE = Junior exempt
- JR = Junior Accelerator Programme entrant
- CO = College Accelerator Programme entrant
- NG = Next Gen Accelerator Program entrant
- w/o = Walkover
- r = Retired
- d = Defaulted

=== Finals ===
Quarterfinals
1/WC	(France) Adrian Mannarino	6	6
(Australia) John-Patrick Smith	4	1
3	(Spain) Pablo Andújar	6	6^{4}	5
(United States) Ulises Blanch	3	7^{7}	7
6	(Chinese Taipei) Jason Jung	2	2
16	(United States) Ernesto Escobedo	6	6
(United States) Kevin King	0	3
(Australia) Aleksandar Vukic	6	6

Semifinals
1/WC	(France) Adrian Mannarino	6	6
(United States) Ulises Blanch	2	4
16	(United States) Ernesto Escobedo	7^{7}	6^{5}	6^{4}
(Australia) Aleksandar Vukic	6^{3}	7^{7}	7^{7}

Final
1/WC	(France) Adrian Mannarino	6	6
(Australia) Aleksandar Vukic	1	3

=== Top half ===
==== Section 1 ====
First round
(Germany) D Altmaier	6	4	2
(Australia) H Bourchier	2	6	6
(Argentina) TM Etcheverry	4	4
(United States) E King	6	6
(Australia) J-P Smith	6	6
WC	(United States) Milledge Cossu	1	0
(Italy) GM Moroni	6	3
(Australia) M Purcell	3	0^{r}

Second round
1/WC	(France) A Mannarino	6	6
(Australia) H Bourchier	2	4
(United States) E King	2	3
14	(Canada) P Polansky	6	6
10	(Canada) S Diez	1	0
(Australia) J-P Smith	6	6
(Italy) GM Moroni	6	6^{4}	6
8	(Italy) F Gaio	4	7^{7}	2

Third round
1/WC	(France) A Mannarino	6	6
14	(Canada) P Polansky	1	2
(Australia) J-P Smith	7^{9}	6
(Italy) GM Moroni	6^{7}	1

Quarterfinals
1/WC	(France) A Mannarino	6	6
(Australia) J-P Smith	4	1

==== Section 2 ====
First round
(Argentina) MF Descotte	5	3
(United States) D Young	7	6
Q	(Italy) L Caruana	1	6	6
(Argentina) A Velotti	6	4	3
(United States) U Blanch	6	6
Q	(Spain) C Gómez-Herrera	3	1
(United Kingdom) J Ward	6	6
(France) G Blancaneaux	4	2

Second round
3	(Spain) P Andújar	6	6
(United States) D Young	3	1
Q	(Italy) L Caruana	3	1
13	(Australia) A Harris	6	6
11	(Serbia) V Troicki	6^{3}	6	3
(United States) U Blanch	7^{7}	4	6
(United Kingdom) J Ward	3	7^{7}	3
7	(Italy) P Lorenzi	6	6^{2}	6

Third round
3	(Spain) P Andújar	6	6
13	(Australia) A Harris	2	2
(United States) U Blanch	6	5	6
7	(Italy) P Lorenzi	4	7	4

Quarterfinals
3	(Spain) P Andújar	6	6^{4}	5
(United States) U Blanch	3	7^{7}	7

=== Bottom half ===
==== Section 3 ====
First round
(Brazil) Oscar José Gutierrez	3	4
(United States) C Altamirano	6	6
(Brazil) O Luz	6^{2}	6	5
(United States) C Eubanks	7^{7}	3	7
(Argentina) JP Ficovich	6^{5}	3
(Australia) J Kubler	7^{7}	6
WC	(Japan) S Mochizuki	6	4	6
WC	(Mexico) A Hernández	3	6	2

Second round
6	(Chinese Taipei) J Jung	7^{7}	6^{6}	7^{8}
(United States) C Altamirano	6^{2}	7^{8}	6^{6}
(United States) C Eubanks	6	4	4
9	(Italy) L Giustino	3	6	6
16	(United States) E Escobedo	6	6
(Australia) J Kubler	1	2
WC	(Japan) S Mochizuki	5	4
4	(Lithuania) R Berankis	7	6

Third round
6	(Chinese Taipei) J Jung	6	6
9	(Italy) L Giustino	1	2
16	(United States) E Escobedo	7^{7}	7^{7}
4	(Lithuania) R Berankis	6^{5}	6^{5}

Quarterfinals
6	(Chinese Taipei) J Jung	2	2
16	(United States) E Escobedo	6	6

==== Section 4 ====
First round
(Colombia) N Mejía	1	4
(Brazil) G Clezar	6	6
(United States) K King	6	6
(Portugal) G Oliveira	1	2
WC	(Mexico) L Patiño	0	4
(Spain) A Menéndez Maceiras	6	6
(Germany) J Lenz	3	3
(Australia) A Vukic	6	6

Second round
5	(Argentina) F Coria	1	7^{7}	6^{5}
(Brazil) G Clezar	6	6^{5}	7^{7}
(United States) K King	6	6^{4}	7
12	(Canada) B Schnur	4	7^{7}	5
15	(Australia) B Tomic	6	6^{2}	6
(Spain) A Menéndez Maceiras	3	7^{7}	3
(Australia) A Vukic	6	3	6
2	(Spain) F López	3	6	3

Third round
(Brazil) G Clezar	6^{4}	6	4
(United States) K King	7^{7}	4	6
15	(Australia) B Tomic	4	4
(Australia) A Vukic	6	6

Quarterfinals
(United States) K King	0	3
(Australia) A Vukic	6	6
