= 2020 Monterrey Challenger – Doubles =

Doubles
- 2020 Monterrey Challenger

Final
- Champions: (Poland) Karol Drzewiecki (Portugal) Gonçalo Oliveira
- Runners-up: (Brazil) Orlando Luz (Brazil) Rafael Matos
- Score: 6–7^{(5–7)}, 6–4, [11–9]

Events
Singles	Doubles
- Monterrey Challenger

Evan King and Nathan Pasha were the defending champions but chose to defend their title with different partners. King partnered Fernando Romboli but lost in the first round to Robert Galloway and Hans Hach Verdugo. Pasha partnered Max Schnur but lost in the first round to Carlos Gómez-Herrera and Viktor Troicki.

Karol Drzewiecki and Gonçalo Oliveira won the title after defeating Orlando Luz and Rafael Matos 6–7^{(5–7)}, 6–4, [11–9] in the final.

== Seeds ==
1. (Australia) Max Purcell / (Australia) John-Patrick Smith (withdrew)
2. (Serbia) Nikola Ćaćić / (Monaco) Hugo Nys (first round)
3. (United States) Evan King / (Brazil) Fernando Romboli (first round)
4. (Brazil) Orlando Luz / (Brazil) Rafael Matos (final)
5. (India) Sriram Balaji / (India) Jeevan Nedunchezhiyan (semifinals)

== Draw ==
Key

- Q = Qualifier
- WC = Wild card
- LL = Lucky loser
- Alt = Alternate
- ITF = ITF entry
- PR = Protected ranking
- SR = Special ranking
- SE = Special exempt
- JE = Junior exempt
- JR = Junior Accelerator Programme entrant
- CO = College Accelerator Programme entrant
- NG = Next Gen Accelerator Program entrant
- w/o = Walkover
- r = Retired
- d = Defaulted

First round
5	(India) S Balaji (India) J Nedunchezhiyan	4	6	[10]
WC	(United States) Milledge Cossu (France) A Mannarino	6	3	[6]
(Germany) D Altmaier (Argentina) F Coria	4	6	[8]
(Italy) F Gaio (Italy) P Lorenzi	6	4	[10]
4	(Brazil) O Luz (Brazil) R Matos	6^{3}	7	[12]
(Canada) P Polansky (Canada) B Schnur	7^{7}	5	[10]
WC	(United States) K King (Mexico) L Patiño	7	6
WC	(Argentina) MF Descotte (Mexico) A Hernández	5	3
Alt	(Spain) C Gómez-Herrera (Serbia) V Troicki	6	3	[10]
(United States) N Pasha (United States) M Schnur	3	6	[6]
(United States) R Galloway (Mexico) H Hach Verdugo	6	7^{7}
3	(United States) E King (Brazil) F Romboli	4	6^{5}
(Australia) A Harris (Australia) J Kubler	7	6
(Canada) S Diez (Italy) L Giustino	5	3
(Poland) K Drzewiecki (Portugal) G Oliveira	6	6
2	(Serbia) N Ćaćić (Monaco) H Nys	4	3

Quarterfinals
5	(India) S Balaji (India) J Nedunchezhiyan	2	6	[15]
(Italy) F Gaio (Italy) P Lorenzi	6	3	[13]
4	(Brazil) O Luz (Brazil) R Matos	6	6
WC	(United States) K King (Mexico) L Patiño	4	4
Alt	(Spain) C Gómez-Herrera (Serbia) V Troicki	1	4
(United States) R Galloway (Mexico) H Hach Verdugo	6	6
(Australia) A Harris (Australia) J Kubler	3	5
(Poland) K Drzewiecki (Portugal) G Oliveira	6	7

Semifinals
5	(India) S Balaji (India) J Nedunchezhiyan	5	4
4	(Brazil) O Luz (Brazil) R Matos	7	6
(United States) R Galloway (Mexico) H Hach Verdugo	6^{5}	7^{7}	[13]
(Poland) K Drzewiecki (Portugal) G Oliveira	7^{7}	6^{5}	[15]

Final
4	(Brazil) O Luz (Brazil) R Matos	7^{7}	4	[9]
(Poland) K Drzewiecki (Portugal) G Oliveira	6^{5}	6	[11]
