= 2020 Internazionali di Tennis del Friuli Venezia Giulia – Doubles =

Doubles
- 2020 Internazionali di Tennis del Friuli Venezia Giulia

Final
- Champions: (Uruguay) Ariel Behar (Kazakhstan) Andrey Golubev
- Runners-up: (Argentina) Andrés Molteni (Monaco) Hugo Nys
- Score: 7–5, 6–4

Events
Singles	Doubles
← 2019 ·	Internazionali di Tennis del Friuli Venezia Giulia	· 2021 →

Tomislav Brkić and Ante Pavić were the defending champions but only Brkić chose to defend his title, partnering Andrea Pellegrino. Brkić lost in the first round to Sergio Martos Gornés and Felipe Meligeni Alves.

Ariel Behar and Andrey Golubev won the title after defeating Andrés Molteni and Hugo Nys 7–5, 6–4 in the final.

== Seeds ==
1. (Argentina) Andrés Molteni / (Monaco) Hugo Nys (final)
2. (Uruguay) Ariel Behar / (Kazakhstan) Andrey Golubev (champions)
3. (Monaco) Romain Arneodo / (Austria) Tristan-Samuel Weissborn (semifinals)
4. (Switzerland) Luca Margaroli / (Italy) Andrea Vavassori (semifinals)

== Draw ==
=== Key ===
- Q = Qualifier
- WC = Wild card
- LL = Lucky loser
- Alt = Alternate
- SE = Special exempt
- PR = Protected ranking
- ITF = ITF entry
- JE = Junior exempt
- w/o = Walkover
- r = Retired
- d = Defaulted
- SR = Special ranking

First round
1	(Argentina) A Molteni (Monaco) H Nys	5	6	[10]
(France) Q Halys (France) A Müller	7	4	[5]
(Bosnia and Herzegovina) T Brkić (Italy) A Pellegrino	3	4
(Spain) S Martos Gornés (Brazil) F Meligeni Alves	6	6
3	(Monaco) R Arneodo (Austria) T-S Weissborn	6	6
(Italy) L Giustino (Italy) M Viola	2	3
WC	(Italy) Giacomo Dambrosi (Serbia) N Zimonjić	2	1
(Dominican Republic) R Cid Subervi (Chile) A Tabilo	6	6
(France) B Bonzi (France) A Hoang	7^{7}	7^{8}
(United Kingdom) L Broady (United Kingdom) L Glasspool	6^{3}	6^{6}
(Argentina) A Collarini (Spain) M Vilella Martínez	1	4
4	(Switzerland) L Margaroli (Italy) A Vavassori	6	6
(France) M Janvier (Spain) B Zapata Miralles	4	4
WC	(Italy) Matteo Marfia (Italy) Daniele Valentino	6	6
WC	(Italy) F Maestrelli (Italy) L Nardi	0	4
2	(Uruguay) A Behar (Kazakhstan) A Golubev	6	6

Quarterfinals
1	(Argentina) A Molteni (Monaco) H Nys	6	6
(Spain) S Martos Gornés (Brazil) F Meligeni Alves	3	2
3	(Monaco) R Arneodo (Austria) T-S Weissborn	6	6
(Dominican Republic) R Cid Subervi (Chile) A Tabilo	3	0
(France) B Bonzi (France) A Hoang	6	4	[5]
4	(Switzerland) L Margaroli (Italy) A Vavassori	1	6	[10]
WC	(Italy) M Marfia (Italy) D Valentino	2	1
2	(Uruguay) A Behar (Kazakhstan) A Golubev	6	6

Semifinals
1	(Argentina) A Molteni (Monaco) H Nys	6	6^{5}	[10]
3	(Monaco) R Arneodo (Austria) T-S Weissborn	3	7^{7}	[8]
4	(Switzerland) L Margaroli (Italy) A Vavassori	6^{3}	2
2	(Uruguay) A Behar (Kazakhstan) A Golubev	7^{7}	6

Final
1	(Argentina) A Molteni (Monaco) H Nys	5	4
2	(Uruguay) A Behar (Kazakhstan) A Golubev	7	6
