= 2020 in tennis =

This page will cover all the important events in the sport of tennis in 2020. Primarily, it will provide the results of notable tournaments throughout the year on both the ATP and WTA Tours, the Davis Cup, and the Fed Cup.

== ITF ==
=== Grand Slam events ===
Category	Championship	Champions	Finalists	Score in the final
Men's singles	Australian Open	(Serbia) Novak Djokovic	(Austria) Dominic Thiem	6–4, 4–6, 2–6, 6–3, 6–4
Men's singles	Wimbledon	Cancelled		
Men's singles	US Open	(Austria) Dominic Thiem	(Germany) Alexander Zverev	2–6, 4–6, 6–4, 6–3, 7–6^{(8–6)}
Men's singles	French Open	(Spain) Rafael Nadal	(Serbia) Novak Djokovic	6–0, 6–2, 7–5

Category	Championship	Champions	Finalists	Score in the final
Women's singles	Australian Open	(United States) Sofia Kenin	(Spain) Garbiñe Muguruza	4–6, 6–2, 6–2
Women's singles	Wimbledon	Cancelled		
Women's singles	US Open	(Japan) Naomi Osaka	(Belarus) Victoria Azarenka	1–6, 6–3, 6–3
Women's singles	French Open	(Poland) Iga Świątek	(United States) Sofia Kenin	6–4, 6–1

Category	Championship	Champions	Finalists	Score in the final
Men's Doubles	Australian Open	(United States) Rajeev Ram (United Kingdom) Joe Salisbury	(Australia) Max Purcell (Australia) Luke Saville	6–4, 6–2
Men's Doubles	Wimbledon	Cancelled		
Men's Doubles	US Open	(Croatia) Mate Pavić (Brazil) Bruno Soares	(Croatia) Nikola Mektić (Netherlands) Wesley Koolhof	7–5, 6–3
Men's Doubles	French Open	(Germany) Kevin Krawietz (Germany) Andreas Mies	(Croatia) Mate Pavić (Brazil) Bruno Soares	6–3, 7–5

Category	Championship	Champions	Finalists	Score in the final
Women's Doubles	Australian Open	(Hungary) Tímea Babos (France) Kristina Mladenovic	(Chinese Taipei) Hsieh Su-wei (Czech Republic) Barbora Strýcová	6–2, 6–1
Women's Doubles	Wimbledon	Cancelled		
Women's Doubles	US Open	(Germany) Laura Siegemund (Russia) Vera Zvonareva	(China) Xu Yifan (United States) Nicole Melichar	6–4, 6–4
Women's Doubles	French Open	(Hungary) Tímea Babos (France) Kristina Mladenovic	(Chile) Alexa Guarachi (United States) Desirae Krawczyk	6–4, 7–5

Category	Championship	Champions	Finalists	Score in the final
Mixed Doubles	Australian Open	(Czech Republic) Barbora Krejčíková (Croatia) Nikola Mektić	(United States) Bethanie Mattek-Sands (United Kingdom) Jamie Murray	5–7, 6–4, [10–1]
Mixed Doubles	Wimbledon	Cancelled		
Mixed Doubles	US Open	Not played		
Mixed Doubles	French Open	Not played		

=== Davis Cup ===
Final tournament postponed to November 2021.

=== Fed Cup ===
Final tournament postponed to November 2021.
