= 2020 Lima Challenger – Doubles =

Doubles
- 2020 Lima Challenger

Final
- Champions: (Spain) Íñigo Cervantes (Spain) Oriol Roca Batalla
- Runners-up: (United States) Collin Altamirano (Ukraine) Vitaliy Sachko
- Score: 6–3, 6–4

Events
Singles	Doubles
- Lima Challenger

Ariel Behar and Gonzalo Escobar were the defending champions but only Escobar chose to defend his title, partnering Artem Sitak. Escobar lost in the semifinals to Íñigo Cervantes and Oriol Roca Batalla.

Cervantes and Roca Batalla won the title after defeating Collin Altamirano and Vitaliy Sachko 6–3, 6–4 in the final.

== Seeds ==
1. (Ecuador) Gonzalo Escobar / (New Zealand) Artem Sitak (semifinals)
2. (France) Sadio Doumbia / (France) Fabien Reboul (first round)
3. (Spain) Sergio Martos Gornés / (Spain) Jaume Munar (withdrew)
4. (Peru) Sergio Galdós / (Argentina) Facundo Mena (quarterfinals)

== Draw ==
Key

- Q = Qualifier
- WC = Wild card
- LL = Lucky loser
- Alt = Alternate
- ITF = ITF entry
- PR = Protected ranking
- SR = Special ranking
- SE = Special exempt
- JE = Junior exempt
- JR = Junior Accelerator Programme entrant
- CO = College Accelerator Programme entrant
- NG = Next Gen Accelerator Program entrant
- w/o = Walkover
- r = Retired
- d = Defaulted

First round
1	(Ecuador) G Escobar (New Zealand) A Sitak	7	6
WC	(Peru) N Álvarez (Chile) N Jarry	5	4
4	(Peru) S Galdós (Argentina) F Mena	6	4	[11]
(Czech Republic) V Kopřiva (Peru) A Merino	4	6	[9]
(Argentina) F Cerúndolo (Argentina) R Olivo
(Spain) Í Cervantes (Spain) O Roca Batalla	w/o
(United States) C Altamirano (Ukraine) V Sachko	6	6
(Netherlands) J de Jong (Netherlands) J Sels	3	3
WC	(Peru) M Echazú (Chile) Bastián Malla	2	1
WC	(Argentina) JM Cerúndolo (Argentina) TA Tirante	6	6
(Colombia) DE Galán (Argentina) A Velotti	6	5	[10]
2	(France) S Doumbia (France) F Reboul	1	7	[3]

Quarterfinals
1	(Ecuador) G Escobar (New Zealand) A Sitak	7^{11}	6
(Peru) C Huertas del Pino (Peru) J Panta	6^{9}	2
4	(Peru) S Galdós (Argentina) F Mena	3	6	[7]
(Spain) Í Cervantes (Spain) O Roca Batalla	6	4	[10]
(United States) C Altamirano (Ukraine) V Sachko	6	6
(Chile) MT Barrios Vera (Chile) A Tabilo	4	1
WC	(Argentina) JM Cerúndolo (Argentina) TA Tirante
(Colombia) DE Galán (Argentina) A Velotti	w/o

Semifinals
1	(Ecuador) G Escobar (New Zealand) A Sitak	6^{7}	5
(Spain) Í Cervantes (Spain) O Roca Batalla	7^{9}	7
(United States) C Altamirano (Ukraine) V Sachko	w/o
(Colombia) DE Galán (Argentina) A Velotti

Final
(Spain) Í Cervantes (Spain) O Roca Batalla	6	6
(United States) C Altamirano (Ukraine) V Sachko	3	4
