= 2020 JC Ferrero Challenger Open – Doubles =

Doubles
- 2020 JC Ferrero Challenger Open

Final
- Champions: (France) Enzo Couacaud (France) Albano Olivetti
- Runners-up: (Spain) Íñigo Cervantes (Spain) Oriol Roca Batalla
- Score: 4–6, 6–4, [10–2]

Events
| Singles | Doubles |
- JC Ferrero Challenger Open

Thomaz Bellucci and Guillermo Durán were the defending champions but chose not to defend their title.

Enzo Couacaud and Albano Olivetti won the title after defeating Íñigo Cervantes and Oriol Roca Batalla 4–6, 6–4, [10–2] in the final.

== Seeds ==
1. (India) Purav Raja / (India) Ramkumar Ramanathan (quarterfinals)
2. (Venezuela) Luis David Martínez / (Mexico) Miguel Ángel Reyes-Varela (semifinals)
3. (India) Sriram Balaji / (Switzerland) Luca Margaroli (quarterfinals)
4. (Poland) Karol Drzewiecki / (Poland) Szymon Walków (first round)

== Draw ==
Key

- Q = Qualifier
- WC = Wild card
- LL = Lucky loser
- Alt = Alternate
- ITF = ITF entry
- PR = Protected ranking
- SR = Special ranking
- SE = Special exempt
- JE = Junior exempt
- JR = Junior Accelerator Programme entrant
- CO = College Accelerator Programme entrant
- NG = Next Gen Accelerator Program entrant
- w/o = Walkover
- r = Retired
- d = Defaulted

First round
1 | (India) P Raja (India) R Ramanathan | 6 | 6
WC | (Spain) D Marrero (Serbia) N Zimonjić | 4 | 0
(Spain) G Granollers (Spain) P Martínez | 6 | 7^{7}
(Colombia) N Barrientos (Colombia) DE Galán | 4 | 6^{3}
3 | (India) S Balaji (Switzerland) L Margaroli | 0 | 6 | [14]
(United States) H Reese (Poland) J Zieliński | 6 | 3 | [12]
(France) E Couacaud (France) A Olivetti | 7^{7} | 3 | [10]
(Spain) S Martos Gornés (Spain) M Vilella Martínez | 6^{3} | 6 | [8]
WC | (Spain) Í Cervantes (Spain) O Roca Batalla | 6 | 6
(Uzbekistan) D Istomin (Canada) P Polansky | 3 | 3
(Canada) S Diez (Spain) T Robredo | 7^{7} | 5 | [10]
4 | (Poland) K Drzewiecki (Poland) S Walków | 6^{5} | 7 | [7]
(Australia) A Bolt (Australia) M Reid | 3 | 4
(France) M Guinard (Austria) L Miedler | 6 | 6
WC | (France) Joe Misrahi (Spain) Alejandro Turriziani Álvarez | 5 | 4
2 | (Venezuela) LD Martínez (Mexico) MÁ Reyes-Varela | 7 | 6

Quarterfinals
1 | (India) P Raja (India) R Ramanathan | 2 | 2
(Spain) G Granollers (Spain) P Martínez | 6 | 6
3 | (India) S Balaji (Switzerland) L Margaroli | 4 | 4
(France) E Couacaud (France) A Olivetti | 6 | 6
WC | (Spain) Í Cervantes (Spain) O Roca Batalla | 6 | 6
(Canada) S Diez (Spain) T Robredo | 0 | 0
(France) M Guinard (Austria) L Miedler | 6^{3} | 3
2 | (Venezuela) LD Martínez (Mexico) MÁ Reyes-Varela | 7^{7} | 6

Semifinals
(Spain) G Granollers (Spain) P Martínez | 6^{5} | 7 | [7]
(France) E Couacaud (France) A Olivetti | 7^{7} | 5 | [10]
WC | (Spain) Í Cervantes (Spain) O Roca Batalla | 6 | 7^{7}
2 | (Venezuela) LD Martínez (Mexico) MÁ Reyes-Varela | 1 | 6^{1}

Final
(France) E Couacaud (France) A Olivetti | 4 | 6 | [10]
WC | (Spain) Í Cervantes (Spain) O Roca Batalla | 6 | 4 | [2]
