= 2020 Lima Challenger – Singles =

Singles
- 2020 Lima Challenger

Final
- Champion: (Colombia) Daniel Elahi Galán
- Runner-up: (Argentina) Thiago Agustín Tirante
- Score: 6–1, 3–6, 6–3

Events
Singles	Doubles
← 2019 ·	Lima Challenger	· 2021 →

Thiago Monteiro was the defending champion but chose not to defend his title.

Daniel Elahi Galán won the title after defeating Thiago Agustín Tirante 6–1, 3–6, 6–3 in the final.

== Seeds ==
1. (Argentina) Federico Coria (second round)
2. (Spain) Roberto Carballés Baena (quarterfinals)
3. (Slovakia) Andrej Martin (withdrew)
4. (Spain) Jaume Munar (withdrew)
5. (Portugal) Pedro Sousa (first round)
6. (Argentina) Facundo Bagnis (first round)
7. (Colombia) Daniel Elahi Galán (champion)
8. (Peru) Juan Pablo Varillas (second round)

== Draw ==
=== Key ===
- Q = Qualifier
- WC = Wild card
- LL = Lucky loser
- Alt = Alternate
- SE = Special exempt
- PR = Protected ranking
- ITF = ITF entry
- JE = Junior exempt
- w/o = Walkover
- r = Retired
- d = Defaulted
- SR = Special ranking

=== Finals ===
Semifinals
Q	(Argentina) Thiago Agustín Tirante	6	6
Q	(Ukraine) Vitaliy Sachko	2	4
(Chile) Marcelo Tomás Barrios Vera	6^{4}	6	4
7	(Colombia) Daniel Elahi Galán	7^{7}	4	6

Final
Q	(Argentina) Thiago Agustín Tirante	1	6	3
7	(Colombia) Daniel Elahi Galán	6	3	6

=== Top half ===
First round
1	(Argentina) F Coria	6	6
(Spain) M Vilella Martínez	2	4
(Netherlands) J Sels	2	2
(Argentina) F Cerúndolo	6	6
(Spain) O Roca Batalla	7	7
(Serbia) P Krstin	5	5
Q	(Argentina) TA Tirante	6	6
5	(Portugal) P Sousa	2	1
LL	(Peru) S Galdós	2	1
(Chile) A Tabilo	6	6
WC	(Chile) N Jarry	2	6	2
(Peru) N Álvarez	6	2	6
(Argentina) JM Cerúndolo	6	7
WC	(Peru) C Huertas del Pino	4	5
Q	(Ukraine) V Sachko	3	6	7^{7}
6	(Argentina) F Bagnis	6	1	6^{5}

Second round
1	(Argentina) F Coria	5	5
(Argentina) F Cerúndolo	7	7
(Spain) O Roca Batalla	3	3
Q	(Argentina) TA Tirante	6	6
(Chile) A Tabilo	6	5	6
(Peru) N Álvarez	4	7	2
(Argentina) JM Cerúndolo	4	3
Q	(Ukraine) V Sachko	6	6

Quarterfinals
(Argentina) F Cerúndolo	2	0
Q	(Argentina) TA Tirante	6	6
(Chile) A Tabilo	4	4
Q	(Ukraine) V Sachko	6	6

Semifinals
Q	(Argentina) TA Tirante	6	6
Q	(Ukraine) V Sachko	2	4

=== Bottom half ===
First round
8	(Peru) JP Varillas	6	7^{8}
Alt	(France) S Doumbia	1	6^{6}
Q	(Chile) G Lama	6^{2}	6	2
(Chile) MT Barrios Vera	7^{7}	3	6
(Czech Republic) V Kopřiva	6	6
LL	(Chile) Bastián Malla	2	3
SE	(Netherlands) J de Jong	6	6
LL	(United States) C Altamirano	2	4
7	(Colombia) DE Galán	6	6
(Argentina) A Velotti	3	1
Q	(Brazil) Wilson Leite	2	7^{7}	1
PR	(Spain) Í Cervantes	6	6^{4}	6
WC	(Peru) J Panta	4	1
(Argentina) R Olivo	6	6
LL	(Peru) M Echazú	1	0
2	(Spain) R Carballés Baena	6	6

Second round
8	(Peru) JP Varillas	1	2
(Chile) MT Barrios Vera	6	6
(Czech Republic) V Kopřiva	6	3	6
SE	(Netherlands) J de Jong	0	6	1
7	(Colombia) DE Galán	6	6
PR	(Spain) Í Cervantes	3	2
(Argentina) R Olivo	7	0	4
2	(Spain) R Carballés Baena	5	6	6

Quarterfinals
(Chile) MT Barrios Vera	6^{4}	6	6
(Czech Republic) V Kopřiva	7^{7}	3	2
7	(Colombia) DE Galán	7^{8}	6
2	(Spain) R Carballés Baena	6^{6}	2

Semifinals
(Chile) MT Barrios Vera	6^{4}	6	4
7	(Colombia) DE Galán	7^{7}	4	6
