= 2019 Hungarian Open – Singles =

Singles
- 2019 Hungarian Open

Final
- Champion: (Italy) Matteo Berrettini
- Runner-up: (Serbia) Filip Krajinović
- Score: 4–6, 6–3, 6–1

Details
- Draw: 28 (4 Q / 2 WC )
- Seeds: 8

Events
Singles	Doubles
← 2018 ·	Hungarian Open	· 2020 →

Marco Cecchinato was the defending champion, but withdrew due to illness.

Matteo Berrettini won the title, defeating Filip Krajinović in the final, 4–6, 6–3, 6–1.

This is the first ATP Tour-level appearance of future world No. 1 and four-time major champion Jannik Sinner. He lost in the second round to Laslo Đere.

== Seeds ==
The top four seeds received a bye into the second round.

1. (Croatia) Marin Čilić (second round)
2. (Croatia) Borna Ćorić (quarterfinals)
3. (Italy) Marco Cecchinato (withdrew)
4. (Georgia (country)) Nikoloz Basilashvili (quarterfinals)
5. (Serbia) Laslo Đere (semifinals)
6. (Australia) John Millman (second round)
7. (Kazakhstan) Mikhail Kukushkin (first round)
8. (Moldova) Radu Albot (second round)

== Draw ==
=== Key ===
- Q = Qualifier
- WC = Wild card
- LL = Lucky loser
- Alt = Alternate
- ITF = ITF entry
- PR = Protected ranking
- SR = Special ranking
- SE = Special exempt
- JE = Junior exempt
- JR = Junior Accelerator Programme entrant
- CO = College Accelerator Programme entrant
- NG = Next Gen Accelerator Program entrant
- w/o = Walkover
- r = Retired
- d = Defaulted

=== Finals ===
Semifinals
(Italy) Matteo Berrettini	6	6
5	(Serbia) Laslo Đere	4	2
(France) Pierre-Hugues Herbert	2	2
Q	(Serbia) Filip Krajinović	6	6

Final
(Italy) Matteo Berrettini	4	6	6
Q	(Serbia) Filip Krajinović	6	3	1

=== Top half ===
First round
Q	(Germany) Y Maden	3	6	4
(Uruguay) P Cuevas	6	3	6
(Australia) B Tomic	6^{5}	4
(Slovenia) A Bedene	7^{7}	6
(Italy) M Berrettini	6	6
7	(Kazakhstan) M Kukushkin	4	4
(Germany) P Gojowczyk	7	6
Q	(South Africa) L Harris	5	4
LL	(Italy) J Sinner	6	0	6
WC	(Hungary) M Valkusz	2	6	4
(Latvia) E Gulbis	4	7^{8}	6^{2}
5	(Serbia) L Đere	6	6^{6}	7^{7}

Second round
1/WC	(Croatia) M Čilić	7	6^{6}	6^{3}
(Uruguay) P Cuevas	5	7^{8}	7^{7}
(Slovenia) A Bedene	6^{8}	2
(Italy) M Berrettini	7^{10}	6
4	(Georgia (country)) N Basilashvili	6	0	6
(Germany) P Gojowczyk	3	6	3
LL	(Italy) J Sinner	3	1
5	(Serbia) L Đere	6	6

Quarterfinals
(Uruguay) P Cuevas	3	6	3
(Italy) M Berrettini	6	1	6
4	(Georgia (country)) N Basilashvili	6	2	3
5	(Serbia) L Đere	3	6	6

Semifinals
(Italy) M Berrettini	6	6
5	(Serbia) L Đere	4	2

=== Bottom half ===
First round
6	(Australia) J Millman	6	6
Q	(Serbia) M Kecmanović	1	2
WC	(Hungary) A Balázs	6	6
(Poland) H Hurkacz	3	4
(France) P-H Herbert	6	6
LL	(Belarus) E Gerasimov	3	2
8	(Moldova) R Albot	7	6
LL	(Ukraine) S Stakhovsky	5	4
(Italy) A Seppi	2	7^{7}	5
Q	(Serbia) F Krajinović	6	6^{3}	7
(Netherlands) R Haase	6^{4}	6	6
(Italy) T Fabbiano	7^{7}	3	2

Second round
6	(Australia) J Millman	4	6	2
WC	(Hungary) A Balázs	6	2	6
(France) P-H Herbert	7	6
LL	(Germany) M Bachinger	5	2
8	(Moldova) R Albot	5	4
Q	(Serbia) F Krajinović	7	6
(Netherlands) R Haase	3	6	4
2	(Croatia) B Ćorić	6	4	6

Quarterfinals
WC	(Hungary) A Balázs	3	4
(France) P-H Herbert	6	6
Q	(Serbia) F Krajinović	6	7
2	(Croatia) B Ćorić	4	5

Semifinals
(France) P-H Herbert	2	2
Q	(Serbia) F Krajinović	6	6

== Qualifying ==
=== Seeds ===
1. (Serbia) Miomir Kecmanović (qualified)
2. (South Africa) Lloyd Harris (qualified)
3. (Serbia) Filip Krajinović (qualified)
4. (Germany) Yannick Maden (qualified)
5. (Ukraine) Sergiy Stakhovsky (qualifying competition, lucky loser)
6. (Germany) Matthias Bachinger (qualifying competition, lucky loser)
7. (Czech Republic) Lukáš Rosol (first round, retired)
8. (Belarus) Egor Gerasimov (qualifying competition, lucky loser)

=== Qualifiers ===
1. (Serbia) Miomir Kecmanović
2. (South Africa) Lloyd Harris
3. (Serbia) Filip Krajinović
4. (Germany) Yannick Maden

=== Lucky losers ===
1. (Ukraine) Sergiy Stakhovsky
2. (Germany) Matthias Bachinger
3. (Belarus) Egor Gerasimov
4. (Italy) Jannik Sinner

=== Qualifying draw ===
==== First qualifier ====
First round
1	(Serbia) Miomir Kecmanović	6	6
(Italy) Alessandro Giannessi	3	4
(Germany) Daniel Brands	5	1
5	(Ukraine) Sergiy Stakhovsky	7	6

Qualifying competition
1	(Serbia) Miomir Kecmanović	6	6
5	(Ukraine) Sergiy Stakhovsky	4	4

==== Second qualifier ====
First round
2	(South Africa) Lloyd Harris	7^{7}	6
(Spain) Daniel Gimeno Traver	6^{1}	3
(Slovakia) Filip Horanský	1	4
6	(Germany) Matthias Bachinger	6	6

Qualifying competition
2	(South Africa) Lloyd Harris	7	6
6	(Germany) Matthias Bachinger	5	4

==== Third qualifier ====
First round
3	(Serbia) Filip Krajinović	7	6
(Italy) Roberto Marcora	5	2
(Italy) Filippo Baldi	3	2
8	(Belarus) Egor Gerasimov	6	6

Qualifying competition
3	(Serbia) Filip Krajinović	7^{7}	6
8	(Belarus) Egor Gerasimov	6^{2}	1

==== Fourth qualifier ====
First round
4	(Germany) Yannick Maden	6	1	6
WC	(Hungary) Zsombor Piros	4	6	3
WC	(Italy) Jannik Sinner	6	3
7	(Czech Republic) Lukáš Rosol	2	0^{r}

Qualifying competition
4	(Germany) Yannick Maden	6	6
WC	(Italy) Jannik Sinner	3	4
