= 2017 Gazprom Hungarian Open =

- Date: April 24 – 30
- Edition: 1st
- Category: ATP World Tour 250 series
- Draw: 28S / 16D
- Prize money: €482,060
- Surface: Clay / outdoor
- Location: Budapest, Hungary
- Venue: Nemzeti Edzés Központ

Champions

Singles
- (France) Lucas Pouille

Doubles
- (United States) Brian Baker / (Croatia) Nikola Mektić
Hungarian Open (tennis)	· 2018 →

The 2017 Gazprom Hungarian Open was a men's tennis tournament played on outdoor clay courts. It was the 1st edition of the Hungarian Open as part of the ATP World Tour 250 series of the 2017 ATP World Tour. It took place at Nemzeti Edzés Központ in Budapest, Hungary, from April 24–30. The tournament replaced the Romanian Open on the ATP World Tour calendar.

== Point distribution ==
Event	W	F	SF	QF	Round of 16	Round of 32	Q	Q2
Singles	250	150	90	45	20	0	12	6
Doubles	250	150	90	45	0	—	—	—

== Singles main-draw entrants ==
=== Seeds ===
Country	Player	Rank^{1}	Seed
FRA	Lucas Pouille	17	1
CRO	Ivo Karlović	21	2
ITA	Fabio Fognini	29	3
ESP	Fernando Verdasco	31	4
FRA	Gilles Simon	32	5
ITA	Paolo Lorenzi	37	6
SRB	Viktor Troicki	38	7
ARG	Diego Schwartzman	41	8

- ^{1} Rankings are as of April 20, 2017

=== Other entrants ===
The following players received wildcards into the singles main draw:

- (Italy) Fabio Fognini
- (Hungary) Márton Fucsovics

The following players received entry from the qualifying draw:

- (United Kingdom) Aljaž Bedene
- (Serbia) Laslo Đere
- (United States) Bjorn Fratangelo
- (Germany) Maximilian Marterer

The following player received entry as lucky losers:

- (Romania) Marius Copil
- (Russia) Evgeny Donskoy
- (Ukraine) Sergiy Stakhovsky

=== Withdrawals ===
Before the tournament

- (Argentina) Federico Delbonis →replaced by (Romania) Marius Copil
- (Ukraine) Alexandr Dolgopolov →replaced by (Bosnia and Herzegovina) Damir Džumhur
- (Turkey) Marsel İlhan →replaced by (Russia) Evgeny Donskoy
- (France) Adrian Mannarino →replaced by (Ukraine) Sergiy Stakhovsky

== Doubles main-draw entrants ==
=== Seeds ===
Country	Player	Country	Player	Rank^{1}	Seed
AUT	Oliver Marach	CRO	Mate Pavić	65	1
PHI	Treat Huey	BLR	Max Mirnyi	69	2
COL	Juan Sebastián Cabal	COL	Robert Farah	76	3
USA	Brian Baker	CRO	Nikola Mektić	88	4

- ^{1} Rankings were as of April 17, 2017

=== Other entrants ===
The following pairs received wildcards into the doubles main draw:

- (Hungary) Attila Balázs / (Hungary) Gábor Borsos
- (Romania) Marius Copil / (Hungary) Márton Fucsovics

== Champions ==
=== Singles ===
- (France) Lucas Pouille def. (United Kingdom) Aljaž Bedene, 6–3, 6–1

=== Doubles ===
- (United States) Brian Baker / (Croatia) Nikola Mektić def. (Colombia) Juan Sebastián Cabal / (Colombia) Robert Farah, 7–6^{(7–2)}, 6–4
