= 2018 Gazprom Hungarian Open =

- Date: April 23 – 29
- Edition: 2nd
- Category: ATP World Tour 250 series
- Draw: 28S / 16D
- Prize money: €501,345
- Surface: Clay / outdoor
- Location: Budapest, Hungary
- Venue: Nemzeti Edzés Központ

Champions

Singles
- (Italy) Marco Cecchinato

Doubles
- (United Kingdom) Dominic Inglot / (Croatia) Franko Škugor
← 2017 ·	Hungarian Open (tennis)	· 2019 →

The 2018 Gazprom Hungarian Open was a men's tennis tournament played on outdoor clay courts. It was the 2nd edition of the Hungarian Open, and part of the ATP World Tour 250 series of the 2018 ATP World Tour. It took place at Nemzeti Edzés Központ in Budapest, Hungary, from April 23–29.

== Singles main-draw entrants ==
=== Seeds ===
Country	Player	Rank^{1}	Seed
FRA	Lucas Pouille	11	1
BIH	Damir Džumhur	31	2
FRA	Richard Gasquet	34	3
CAN	Denis Shapovalov	45	4
SLO	Aljaž Bedene	58	5
HUN	Márton Fucsovics	59	6
GER	Jan-Lennard Struff	61	7
ITA	Andreas Seppi	62	8

- ^{1} Rankings are as of April 16, 2018

=== Other entrants ===
The following players received wildcards into the singles main draw:

- (Hungary) Attila Balázs
- (Kazakhstan) Alexander Bublik
- (Hungary) Zsombor Piros

The following players received entry from the qualifying draw:

- (Italy) Matteo Berrettini
- (Poland) Hubert Hurkacz
- (Italy) Lorenzo Sonego
- (Estonia) Jürgen Zopp

The following players received entry as lucky losers:

- (Italy) Marco Cecchinato
- (Germany) Yannick Maden

=== Withdrawals ===
Before the tournament

- (Serbia) Laslo Đere → replaced by (Italy) Marco Cecchinato
- (Ukraine) Alexandr Dolgopolov → replaced by (Uzbekistan) Denis Istomin
- (Serbia) Filip Krajinović → replaced by (Australia) John Millman
- (Germany) Florian Mayer → replaced by (Germany) Yannick Maden
- (Czech Republic) Jiří Veselý → replaced by (Russia) Mikhail Youzhny

== Doubles main-draw entrants ==
=== Seeds ===
Country	Player	Country	Player	Rank^{1}	Seed
CRO	Nikola Mektić	AUT	Alexander Peya	61	1
JPN	Ben McLachlan	GER	Jan-Lennard Struff	77	2
BLR	Max Mirnyi	AUT	Philipp Oswald	77	3
NED	Matwé Middelkoop	ARG	Andrés Molteni	80	4

- ^{1} Rankings are as of April 16, 2018

=== Other entrants ===
The following pairs received wildcards into the doubles main draw:

- (Hungary) Attila Balázs / (Hungary) Márton Fucsovics
- (Romania) Marius Copil / (Romania) Florin Mergea

== Champions ==
=== Singles ===
- (Italy) Marco Cecchinato def. (Australia) John Millman, 7–5, 6–4

=== Doubles ===
- (United Kingdom) Dominic Inglot / (Croatia) Franko Škugor def. (Netherlands) Matwé Middelkoop / (Argentina) Andrés Molteni, 6–7^{(8–10)}, 6–1, [10–8]
