= 2017 Gazprom Hungarian Open – Doubles =

Doubles
- 2017 Gazprom Hungarian Open

Final
- Champions: (United States) Brian Baker (Croatia) Nikola Mektić
- Runners-up: (Colombia) Juan Sebastián Cabal (Colombia) Robert Farah
- Score: 7–6^{(7–2)}, 6–4

Details
- Draw: 16 (2 WC )
- Seeds: 4

Events
Singles	Doubles
Gazprom Hungarian Open	· 2018 →

This was the first edition of the tournament.

Brian Baker and Nikola Mektić won the title, defeating Juan Sebastián Cabal and Robert Farah in the final, 7–6^{(7–2)}, 6–4.

== Seeds ==
1. (Austria) Oliver Marach / (Croatia) Mate Pavić (quarterfinals)
2. (Philippines) Treat Huey / (Belarus) Max Mirnyi (semifinals)
3. (Colombia) Juan Sebastián Cabal / (Colombia) Robert Farah (final)
4. (United States) Brian Baker / (Croatia) Nikola Mektić (champions)

== Draw ==
=== Key ===
- Q = Qualifier
- WC = Wild card
- LL = Lucky loser
- Alt = Alternate
- SE = Special exempt
- PR = Protected ranking
- ITF = ITF entry
- JE = Junior exempt
- w/o = Walkover
- r = Retired
- d = Defaulted
- SR = Special ranking

=== Draw ===
First round
1	(Austria) O Marach (Croatia) M Pavić	6	6^{6}	[11]
(United States) N Monroe (New Zealand) A Sitak	2	7^{8}	[9]
(France) L Pouille (France) G Simon	6^{5}	1
(Netherlands) R Haase (United Kingdom) D Inglot	7^{7}	6
3	(Colombia) JS Cabal (Colombia) R Farah	6	6
(Netherlands) W Koolhof (Netherlands) M Middelkoop	3	3
(Italy) P Lorenzi (Chile) J Peralta	6	6
(Serbia) V Troicki (Serbia) N Zimonjić	4	4
(Argentina) A Molteni (Argentina) D Schwartzman	3	2
WC	(Hungary) A Balázs (Hungary) G Borsos	6	6
WC	(Romania) M Copil (Hungary) M Fucsovics	5	2
4	(United States) B Baker (Croatia) N Mektić	7	6
(Croatia) B Ćorić (Belgium) S Darcis	4	2
(Australia) S Groth (Sweden) R Lindstedt	6	6
(United States) R Harrison (New Zealand) M Venus	3	3
2	(Philippines) T Huey (Belarus) M Mirnyi	6	6

Quarterfinals
1	(Austria) O Marach (Croatia) M Pavić	6^{5}	5
(Netherlands) R Haase (United Kingdom) D Inglot	7^{7}	7
3	(Colombia) JS Cabal (Colombia) R Farah	7^{7}	4	[10]
(Italy) P Lorenzi (Chile) J Peralta	6^{2}	6	[5]
WC	(Hungary) A Balázs (Hungary) G Borsos	2	6^{2}
4	(United States) B Baker (Croatia) N Mektić	6	7^{7}
(Australia) S Groth (Sweden) R Lindstedt	6^{8}	6	[7]
2	(Philippines) T Huey (Belarus) M Mirnyi	7^{10}	4	[10]

Semifinals
(Netherlands) R Haase (United Kingdom) D Inglot	3	7^{9}	[3]
3	(Colombia) JS Cabal (Colombia) R Farah	6	6^{7}	[10]
4	(United States) B Baker (Croatia) N Mektić	6	6
2	(Philippines) T Huey (Belarus) M Mirnyi	4	2

Final
3	(Colombia) JS Cabal (Colombia) R Farah	6^{2}	4
4	(United States) B Baker (Croatia) N Mektić	7^{7}	6
