= 2018 Gazprom Hungarian Open – Doubles =

Doubles
- 2018 Gazprom Hungarian Open

Final
- Champions: (United Kingdom) Dominic Inglot (Croatia) Franko Škugor
- Runners-up: (Netherlands) Matwé Middelkoop (Argentina) Andrés Molteni
- Score: 6–7^{(8–10)}, 6–1, [10–8]

Details
- Draw: 16 (2 WC )
- Seeds: 4

Events
Singles	Doubles
← 2017 ·	Gazprom Hungarian Open	· 2019 →

Brian Baker and Nikola Mektić were the defending champions, but Baker chose not to participate this year. Mektić played alongside Alexander Peya, but lost in the first round to Wesley Koolhof and Artem Sitak.

Dominic Inglot and Franko Škugor won the title, defeating Matwé Middelkoop and Andrés Molteni in the final, 6–7^{(8–10)}, 6–1, [10–8].

== Seeds ==
1. (Croatia) Nikola Mektić / (Austria) Alexander Peya (first round)
2. (Japan) Ben McLachlan / (Germany) Jan-Lennard Struff (semifinals)
3. (Belarus) Max Mirnyi / (Austria) Philipp Oswald (first round)
4. (Netherlands) Matwé Middelkoop / (Argentina) Andrés Molteni (final)

== Draw ==
=== Key ===
- Q = Qualifier
- WC = Wild card
- LL = Lucky loser
- Alt = Alternate
- SE = Special exempt
- PR = Protected ranking
- ITF = ITF entry
- JE = Junior exempt
- w/o = Walkover
- r = Retired
- d = Defaulted
- SR = Special ranking

=== Draw ===
First round
1	(Croatia) N Mektić (Austria) A Peya	5	7^{7}	[7]
(Netherlands) W Koolhof (New Zealand) A Sitak	7	6^{4}	[10]
(India) D Sharan (United Kingdom) N Skupski	2	3
(Poland) M Matkowski (United States) N Monroe	6	6
3	(Belarus) M Mirnyi (Austria) P Oswald	6	5	[7]
(United Kingdom) D Inglot (Croatia) F Škugor	4	7	[10]
(Brazil) M Demoliner (Mexico) S González	6	7^{7}
WC	(Romania) M Copil (Romania) F Mergea	2	6^{1}
(Bosnia and Herzegovina) D Džumhur (Czech Republic) R Jebavý	4	5
(France) H Nys (Canada) D Shapovalov	6	7
(France) J Eysseric (France) L Pouille	4	6^{4}
4	(Netherlands) M Middelkoop (Argentina) A Molteni	6	7^{7}
(France) F Martin (India) P Raja	6	6^{3}	[7]
WC	(Hungary) A Balázs (Hungary) M Fucsovics	4	7^{7}	[10]
(Chile) H Podlipnik-Castillo (Belarus) A Vasilevski	6^{5}	1
2	(Japan) B McLachlan (Germany) J-L Struff	7^{7}	6

Quarterfinals
(Netherlands) W Koolhof (New Zealand) A Sitak	3	4
(Poland) M Matkowski (United States) N Monroe	6	6
(United Kingdom) D Inglot (Croatia) F Škugor	6	7
(Brazil) M Demoliner (Mexico) S González	4	5
(France) H Nys (Canada) D Shapovalov	3	6^{0}
4	(Netherlands) M Middelkoop (Argentina) A Molteni	6	7^{7}
WC	(Hungary) A Balázs (Hungary) M Fucsovics	3	3
2	(Japan) B McLachlan (Germany) J-L Struff	6	6

Semifinals
(Poland) M Matkowski (United States) N Monroe	7	3	[9]
(United Kingdom) D Inglot (Croatia) F Škugor	5	6	[11]
4	(Netherlands) M Middelkoop (Argentina) A Molteni	7^{14}	6^{6}	[10]
2	(Japan) B McLachlan (Germany) J-L Struff	6^{12}	7^{8}	[8]

Final
(United Kingdom) D Inglot (Croatia) F Škugor	6^{8}	6	[10]
4	(Netherlands) M Middelkoop (Argentina) A Molteni	7^{10}	1	[8]
