= 2017 Gazprom Hungarian Open – Singles =

Singles
- 2017 Gazprom Hungarian Open

Final
- Champion: (France) Lucas Pouille
- Runner-up: (United Kingdom) Aljaž Bedene
- Score: 6–3, 6–1

Details
- Draw: 28 (4 Q / 2 WC )
- Seeds: 8

Events
| Singles | Doubles |
| Hungarian Open (tennis) | · 2018 → |

This was the first edition of the tournament.

Lucas Pouille won the title, defeating Aljaž Bedene in the final, 6–3, 6–1.

== Seeds ==
The top four seeds receive a bye into the second round.

1. (France) Lucas Pouille (champion)
2. (Croatia) Ivo Karlović (quarterfinals)
3. (Italy) Fabio Fognini (second round)
4. (Spain) Fernando Verdasco (quarterfinals)
5. (France) Gilles Simon (first round)
6. (Italy) Paolo Lorenzi (semifinals)
7. (Serbia) Viktor Troicki (second round)
8. (Argentina) Diego Schwartzman (first round)

== Draw ==
=== Key ===
- Q = Qualifier
- WC = Wild card
- LL = Lucky loser
- Alt = Alternate
- SE = Special exempt
- PR = Protected ranking
- ITF = ITF entry
- JE = Junior exempt
- w/o = Walkover
- r = Retired
- d = Defaulted
- SR = Special ranking

=== Finals ===
Semifinals
1 | (France) Lucas Pouille | 6 | 7
6 | (Italy) Paolo Lorenzi | 2 | 5
Q | (Serbia) Laslo Đere | 2 | 4
Q | (United Kingdom) Aljaž Bedene | 6 | 6

Final
1 | (France) Lucas Pouille | 6 | 6
Q | (United Kingdom) Aljaž Bedene | 3 | 1

=== Top half ===
First round
(Croatia) B Ćorić | 6^{4} | 4
(Czech Republic) J Veselý | 7^{7} | 6
Q | (Germany) M Marterer | 2 | 3
(Slovakia) M Kližan | 6 | 6
Q | (United States) B Fratangelo | 6 | 6
5 | (France) G Simon | 4 | 1
(United States) R Harrison | 6^{6} | 3
(Russia) A Kuznetsov | 7^{8} | 6
LL | (Ukraine) S Stakhovsky | 6 | 3
(Germany) F Mayer | 4 | 0^{r}
(Kazakhstan) M Kukushkin | 4 | 5
6 | (Italy) P Lorenzi | 6 | 7

Second round
1 | (France) L Pouille | 6 | 4 | 7^{7}
(Czech Republic) J Veselý | 3 | 6 | 6^{4}
(Slovakia) M Kližan | 6 | 6
Q | (United States) B Fratangelo | 3 | 2
3/WC | (Italy) F Fognini | 3 | 6 | 6^{4}
(Russia) A Kuznetsov | 6 | 3 | 7^{7}
LL | (Ukraine) S Stakhovsky | 4 | 6 | 3
6 | (Italy) P Lorenzi | 6 | 3 | 6

Quarterfinals
1 | (France) L Pouille | 6 | 6
(Slovakia) M Kližan | 4 | 3
(Russia) A Kuznetsov | 4 | 4
6 | (Italy) P Lorenzi | 6 | 6

Semifinals
1 | (France) L Pouille | 6 | 7
6 | (Italy) P Lorenzi | 2 | 5

=== Bottom half ===
First round
7 | (Serbia) V Troicki | 6 | 6
LL | (Russia) E Donskoy | 1 | 2
(Russia) D Medvedev | 0 | 5^{r}
Q | (Serbia) L Đere | 6 | 5
WC | (Hungary) M Fucsovics | 6 | 6
(Russia) M Youzhny | 2 | 2
8 | (Argentina) D Schwartzman | 1 | 3
(Netherlands) R Haase | 6 | 6
Q | (United Kingdom) A Bedene | 7 | 6
LL | (Romania) M Copil | 5 | 2
(Belgium) S Darcis | 6 | 2 | 2
(Bosnia and Herzegovina) D Džumhur | 3 | 6 | 6

Second round
7 | (Serbia) V Troicki | 5 | 2
Q | (Serbia) L Đere | 7 | 6
WC | (Hungary) M Fucsovics | 6^{6} | 3
4 | (Spain) F Verdasco | 7^{8} | 6
(Netherlands) R Haase | 4 | 4
Q | (United Kingdom) A Bedene | 6 | 6
(Bosnia and Herzegovina) D Džumhur | 1 | 6 | 4
2 | (Croatia) I Karlović | 6 | 3 | 6

Quarterfinals
Q | (Serbia) L Đere | 2 | 7^{7} | 6
4 | (Spain) F Verdasco | 6 | 6^{4} | 2
Q | (United Kingdom) A Bedene | 6 | 6
2 | (Croatia) I Karlović | 4 | 3

Semifinals
Q | (Serbia) L Đere | 2 | 4
Q | (United Kingdom) A Bedene | 6 | 6

== Qualifying ==
=== Seeds ===
1. (United Kingdom) Aljaž Bedene (qualified)
2. (Serbia) Dušan Lajović (first round)
3. (Russia) Evgeny Donskoy (qualifying competition, lucky loser)
4. (Ukraine) Sergiy Stakhovsky (qualifying competition, lucky loser)
5. (Slovakia) Norbert Gombos (first round)
6. (Romania) Marius Copil (qualifying competition, lucky loser)
7. (United States) Bjorn Fratangelo (qualified)
8. (Germany) Maximilian Marterer (qualified)

=== Qualifiers ===
1. (United Kingdom) Aljaž Bedene
2. (United States) Bjorn Fratangelo
3. (Serbia) Laslo Đere
4. (Germany) Maximilian Marterer

=== Lucky losers ===
1. (Russia) Evgeny Donskoy
2. (Ukraine) Sergiy Stakhovsky
3. (Romania) Marius Copil

=== Qualifying draw ===
==== First qualifier ====
First round
1 | (United Kingdom) Aljaž Bedene | 6 | 6
(Italy) Federico Gaio | 4 | 2
(Australia) Sam Groth | 6 | 4 | 2
6 | (Romania) Marius Copil | 4 | 6 | 6

Qualifying competition
1 | (United Kingdom) Aljaž Bedene | 6 | 6^{2} | 6
6 | (Romania) Marius Copil | 3 | 7^{7} | 1

==== Second qualifier ====
First round
2 | (Serbia) Dušan Lajović | 1 | 6 | 4
WC | (Hungary) Attila Balázs | 6 | 1 | 6
(Germany) Tobias Kamke | 1 | 3
7 | (United States) Bjorn Fratangelo | 6 | 6

Qualifying competition
WC | (Hungary) Attila Balázs | 3 | 7 | 4
7 | (United States) Bjorn Fratangelo | 6 | 5 | 6

==== Third qualifier ====
First round
3 | (Russia) Evgeny Donskoy | 6 | 7^{7}
(Bosnia and Herzegovina) Aldin Šetkić | 4 | 6^{3}
(Serbia) Laslo Đere | 4 | 6 | 7
5 | (Slovakia) Norbert Gombos | 6 | 4 | 5

Qualifying competition
3 | (Russia) Evgeny Donskoy | 4 | 7^{7} | 2
(Serbia) Laslo Đere | 6 | 6^{5} | 6

==== Fourth qualifier ====
First round
4 | (Ukraine) Sergiy Stakhovsky | 6 | 6
WC | (Hungary) Zsombor Piros | 2 | 4
(Bosnia and Herzegovina) Mirza Bašić | 2 | 2
8 | (Germany) Maximilian Marterer | 6 | 6

Qualifying competition
4 | (Ukraine) Sergiy Stakhovsky | 6^{7} | 3
8 | (Germany) Maximilian Marterer | 7^{9} | 6
