= 2019 Hungarian Open – Doubles =

Doubles
- 2019 Hungarian Open

Final
- Champions: (United Kingdom) Ken Skupski (United Kingdom) Neal Skupski
- Runners-up: (New Zealand) Marcus Daniell (Netherlands) Wesley Koolhof
- Score: 6–3, 6–4

Details
- Draw: 16 (2 WC )
- Seeds: 4

Events
Singles	Doubles
← 2018 ·	Hungarian Open (tennis)	· 2020 →

Dominic Inglot and Franko Škugor were the defending champions, but Škugor chose to compete in Barcelona instead. Inglot played alongside Rohan Bopanna, but lost in the quarterfinals to Andre Begemann and Ernests Gulbis.

Ken and Neal Skupski won the title, defeating Marcus Daniell and Wesley Koolhof in the final, 6–3, 6–4.

== Seeds ==
1. (India) Rohan Bopanna / (United Kingdom) Dominic Inglot (quarterfinals)
2. (Mexico) Santiago González / (Netherlands) Matwé Middelkoop (first round)
3. (United Kingdom) Ken Skupski / (United Kingdom) Neal Skupski (champions)
4. (Netherlands) Robin Haase / (Denmark) Frederik Nielsen (quarterfinals)

== Draw ==
=== Key ===
- Q = Qualifier
- WC = Wild card
- LL = Lucky loser
- Alt = Alternate
- SE = Special exempt
- PR = Protected ranking
- ITF = ITF entry
- JE = Junior exempt
- w/o = Walkover
- r = Retired
- d = Defaulted
- SR = Special ranking

=== Draw ===
First round
1	(India) R Bopanna (United Kingdom) D Inglot	6	7
Alt	(Italy) T Fabbiano (Australia) J Millman	3	5
Alt	(Germany) A Begemann (Latvia) E Gulbis	6	7
(Czech Republic) R Jebavý (Argentina) A Molteni	4	5
3	(United Kingdom) K Skupski (United Kingdom) N Skupski	6	7^{7}
WC	(Hungary) M Valkusz (Serbia) N Zimonjić	0	6^{4}
(Sweden) R Lindstedt (Pakistan) A-u-H Qureshi	3	6	[9]
(Brazil) M Demoliner (India) D Sharan	6	4	[11]
(New Zealand) M Daniell (Netherlands) W Koolhof	6	6
(Poland) H Hurkacz (France) F Martin	2	3
WC	(Hungary) G Borsos (Hungary) P Nagy	6	3	[8]
4	(Netherlands) R Haase (Denmark) F Nielsen	2	6	[10]
(Moldova) R Albot (Georgia (country)) N Basilashvili	3	3
(Germany) K Krawietz (Germany) A Mies	6	6
(United Kingdom) L Bambridge (United Kingdom) J O'Mara	3	6	[10]
2	(Mexico) S González (Netherlands) M Middelkoop	6	3	[8]

Quarterfinals
1	(India) R Bopanna (United Kingdom) D Inglot	3	4
Alt	(Germany) A Begemann (Latvia) E Gulbis	6	6
3	(United Kingdom) K Skupski (United Kingdom) N Skupski	7^{8}	5	[10]
(Brazil) M Demoliner (India) D Sharan	6^{6}	7	[7]
(New Zealand) M Daniell (Netherlands) W Koolhof	6	7^{7}
4	(Netherlands) R Haase (Denmark) F Nielsen	4	6^{5}
(Germany) K Krawietz (Germany) A Mies	3	6	[10]
(United Kingdom) L Bambridge (United Kingdom) J O'Mara	6	4	[6]

Semifinals
Alt	(Germany) A Begemann (Latvia) E Gulbis	2	7^{7}	[6]
3	(United Kingdom) K Skupski (United Kingdom) N Skupski	6	6^{2}	[10]
(New Zealand) M Daniell (Netherlands) W Koolhof	3	6	[10]
(Germany) K Krawietz (Germany) A Mies	6	2	[8]

Final
3	(United Kingdom) K Skupski (United Kingdom) N Skupski	6	6
(New Zealand) M Daniell (Netherlands) W Koolhof	3	4
