= 2020 Bangkok Challenger =

- Date: 12–18 January
- Edition: 12th
- Surface: Hard
- Location: Bangkok, Thailand

Champions

Singles
- (Hungary) Attila Balázs

Doubles
- (Kazakhstan) Andrey Golubev / (Kazakhstan) Aleksandr Nedovyesov
- Bangkok Challenger

The 2020 Bangkok Challenger was a professional tennis tournament played on hard courts. It was the twelfth edition of the tournament and was part of the 2020 ATP Challenger Tour. It took place in Bangkok, Thailand between 12 and 18 January 2020.

== Singles main-draw entrants ==
=== Seeds ===
Country	Player	Rank^{1}	Seed
CZE	Jiří Veselý	102	1
HUN	Attila Balázs	131	2
NED	Robin Haase	161	3
UZB	Denis Istomin	174	4
TUN	Malek Jaziri	229	5
RUS	Roman Safiullin	248	6
UKR	Illya Marchenko	251	7
RUS	Evgeny Karlovskiy	252	8
ITA	Gian Marco Moroni	255	9
ARG	Renzo Olivo	263	10
~~RUS~~	~~Teymuraz Gabashvili~~	~~270~~	~~11~~
POR	Gonçalo Oliveira	271	12
COL	Santiago Giraldo	272	13
USA	JC Aragone	274	14
CRO	Borna Gojo	275	15
GER	Daniel Altmaier	276	16

- ^{1} Rankings are as of 6 January 2020.

=== Other entrants ===
The following players received wildcards into the singles main draw:

- (Thailand) Congsup Congcar
- (Thailand) Palaphoom Kovapitukted
- (Thailand) Michael Mathayomchand
- (Thailand) Kasidit Samrej
- (Thailand) Wishaya Trongcharoenchaikul

The following player received entry into the singles main draw as an alternate:

- (France) Sadio Doumbia

The following players received entry from the qualifying draw:

- (Ukraine) Vladyslav Orlov
- (India) Sidharth Rawat

The following player received entry into the singles main draw as a lucky loser:

- (Bosnia and Herzegovina) Tomislav Brkić

== Champions ==
=== Singles ===
- (Hungary) Attila Balázs def. (Russia) Aslan Karatsev 7–6^{(7–5)}, 0–6, 7–6^{(8–6)}.

=== Doubles ===
- (Kazakhstan) Andrey Golubev / (Kazakhstan) Aleksandr Nedovyesov def. (Thailand) Sanchai Ratiwatana / (Indonesia) Christopher Rungkat 3–6, 7–6^{(7–1)}, [10–5].
