= 2018 Prosperita Open – Singles =

Singles
- 2018 Prosperita Open

Final
- Champion: (Belgium) Arthur De Greef
- Runner-up: (Croatia) Nino Serdarušić
- Score: 4–6, 6–4, 6–2

Events
Singles	Doubles
- Prosperita Open

Stefano Travaglia was the defending champion but chose not to defend his title.

Arthur De Greef won the title after defeating Nino Serdarušić 4–6, 6–4, 6–2 in the final.

== Seeds ==
1. (Belgium) Ruben Bemelmans (first round)
2. (Ukraine) Sergiy Stakhovsky (first round)
3. (Hungary) Attila Balázs (first round)
4. (France) Gleb Sakharov (first round)
5. (France) Benjamin Bonzi (first round)
6. (Portugal) Gonçalo Oliveira (first round)
7. (Czech Republic) Adam Pavlásek (second round)
8. (India) Sumit Nagal (first round)

== Draw ==
Key

- Q = Qualifier
- WC = Wild card
- LL = Lucky loser
- Alt = Alternate
- ITF = ITF entry
- PR = Protected ranking
- SR = Special ranking
- SE = Special exempt
- JE = Junior exempt
- JR = Junior Accelerator Programme entrant
- CO = College Accelerator Programme entrant
- NG = Next Gen Accelerator Program entrant
- w/o = Walkover
- r = Retired
- d = Defaulted

=== Finals ===
Semifinals
(Croatia) Nino Serdarušić	3	7	6
(France) Grégoire Barrère	6	5	1
(Italy) Matteo Donati	6^{3}	4
(Belgium) Arthur De Greef	7^{7}	6

Final
(Croatia) Nino Serdarušić	6	4	2
(Belgium) Arthur De Greef	4	6	6

=== Top half ===
First round
1	(Belgium) R Bemelmans	1	1
(France) V Millot	6	6
(Croatia) N Serdarušić	6	7
(Czech Republic) L Rosol	4	5
(France) A Hoang	6	6^{4}	6
WC	(Czech Republic) M Vocel	2	7^{7}	2
(Bosnia and Herzegovina) T Brkić	6	3	6
8	(India) S Nagal	4	6	1
4	(France) G Sakharov	2	1
(Italy) G Quinzi	6	6
(Italy) L Giustino	6	7^{7}
WC	(Czech Republic) P Rikl	3	6^{3}
(France) G Blancaneaux	6^{3}	5
(Belgium) K Coppejans	7^{7}	7
(France) G Barrère	6	1	7^{7}
5	(France) B Bonzi	2	6	6^{2}

Second round
(France) V Millot	5	0^{r}
(Croatia) N Serdarušić	7	3
(France) A Hoang	5	6	3
(Bosnia and Herzegovina) T Brkić	7	4	6
(Italy) G Quinzi	6	6
(Italy) L Giustino	3	2
(Belgium) K Coppejans	4	3
(France) G Barrère	6	6

Quarterfinals
(Croatia) N Serdarušić	6	6
(Bosnia and Herzegovina) T Brkić	3	2
(Italy) G Quinzi	2	6^{5}
(France) G Barrère	6	7^{7}

Semifinals
(Croatia) N Serdarušić	3	7	6
(France) G Barrère	6	5	1

=== Bottom half ===
First round
6	(Portugal) G Oliveira	6	3	6^{4}
(Belarus) U Ignatik	4	6	7^{7}
Q	(France) E Furness	2	3
(Italy) M Donati	6	6
(Netherlands) T Griekspoor	2	1
Q	(France) M Bourgue	6	6
(Argentina) A Collarini	6	6
3	(Hungary) A Balázs	4	4
7	(Czech Republic) A Pavlásek	6	6
WC	(Czech Republic) M Gengel	2	3
WC	(Czech Republic) D Kellovský	2	7^{7}	5
(Czech Republic) Z Kolář	6	6^{1}	7
Q	(Spain) P Martínez	3	7	6
Q	(France) E Benchetrit	6	5	3
(Belgium) A De Greef	6	3	6
2	(Ukraine) S Stakhovsky	4	6	3

Second round
(Belarus) U Ignatik	5	3
(Italy) M Donati	7	6
Q	(France) M Bourgue	2	6	4
(Argentina) A Collarini	6	1	6
7	(Czech Republic) A Pavlásek	7^{7}	0	5
(Czech Republic) Z Kolář	6^{5}	6	7
Q	(Spain) P Martínez	6^{2}	2
(Belgium) A De Greef	7^{7}	6

Quarterfinals
(Italy) M Donati	5	6	7
(Argentina) A Collarini	7	3	5
(Czech Republic) Z Kolář	6^{4}	6^{2}
(Belgium) A De Greef	7^{7}	7^{7}

Semifinals
(Italy) M Donati	6^{3}	4
(Belgium) A De Greef	7^{7}	6
