= 2018 Prosperita Open =

- Date: 30 April – 6 May
- Edition: 15th
- Draw: 32S / 16D
- Surface: Clay
- Location: Ostrava, Czech Republic

Champions

Singles
- (Belgium) Arthur De Greef

Doubles
- (Hungary) Attila Balázs / (Portugal) Gonçalo Oliveira
- Prosperita Open

The 2018 Prosperita Open was a professional tennis tournament played on clay courts. It was the 15th edition of the tournament which was part of the 2018 ATP Challenger Tour. It took place in Ostrava, Czech Republic between 30 April and 6 May.

== Singles main-draw entrants ==
=== Seeds ===
Country	Player	Rank^{1}	Seed
BEL	Ruben Bemelmans	107	1
UKR	Sergiy Stakhovsky	122	2
HUN	Attila Balázs	163	3
FRA	Gleb Sakharov	187	4
FRA	Benjamin Bonzi	198	5
POR	Gonçalo Oliveira	212	6
CZE	Adam Pavlásek	218	7
IND	Sumit Nagal	219	8

- ^{1} Rankings are as of 23 April 2018.

=== Other entrants ===
The following players received wildcards into the singles main draw:

- (Czech Republic) Marek Gengel
- (Czech Republic) Dominik Kellovský
- (Czech Republic) Patrik Rikl
- (Czech Republic) Matěj Vocel

The following players received entry from the qualifying draw:

- (France) Elliot Benchetrit
- (France) Mathias Bourgue
- (France) Evan Furness
- (Spain) Pedro Martínez

== Champions ==
=== Singles ===
- (Belgium) Arthur De Greef def. (Croatia) Nino Serdarušić 4–6, 6–4, 6–2.

=== Doubles ===
- (Hungary) Attila Balázs / (Portugal) Gonçalo Oliveira def. (Czech Republic) Lukáš Rosol / (Ukraine) Sergiy Stakhovsky 6–0, 7–5.
