= 2017 Davis Cup World Group play-offs =

2017 Davis Cup main play-offs

The 2017 Davis Cup World Group play-offs were held from September 15 to 17. They were the main play-offs of the 2017 Davis Cup. The winners of the playoffs advanced to the 2018 Davis Cup World Group, and the losers were relegated to their respective Zonal Regions I.

== Teams ==
Bold indicates team had qualified for the 2018 Davis Cup World Group.

From World Group

- Argentina
- **Germany**
- Czech Republic
- **Switzerland**
- **Japan**
- **Canada**
- Russia
- **Croatia**

From Americas Group I

- Brazil
- Colombia

From Asia/Oceania Group I

- **Kazakhstan**
- India

From Europe/Africa Group I

- **Hungary**
- **Netherlands**
- Belarus
- Portugal

== Results summary ==
Date: 15–17 September

The eight losing teams in the World Group first round ties and eight winners of the Zonal Group I final round ties competed in the World Group play-offs for spots in the 2018 World Group. The draw took place on April 11 in London.

**Seeded teams**

1. Argentina
2. Croatia
3. Switzerland
4. Czech Republic
5. Germany
6. Japan
7. Russia
8. Canada

**Unseeded teams**

- Belarus
- Brazil
- Colombia
- Hungary
- India
- Kazakhstan
- Netherlands
- Portugal

Home team	Score	Visiting team	Location	Venue	Door	Surface
**Kazakhstan**	3–2	Argentina	Astana	National Tennis Center	Indoor	Hard
Colombia	1–4	**Croatia**	Bogotá	Plaza de Toros la Santamaría	Outdoor	Clay
**Switzerland**	3–2	Belarus	Biel/Bienne	Swiss Tennis Arena	Indoor	Hard
**Netherlands**	3–2	Czech Republic	The Hague	Sportcampus Zuiderpark	Indoor	Clay
Portugal	2–3	**Germany**	Oeiras	Clube de Ténis do Jamor	Outdoor	Clay
**Japan**	3–1	Brazil	Osaka	Utsubo Tennis Center	Outdoor	Hard
**Hungary**	3–1	Russia	Budapest	Margaret Island Athletic Centre	Outdoor	Clay
**Canada**	3–2	India	Edmonton	Northlands Coliseum	Indoor	Hard

- Canada, Croatia, Germany, Japan and Switzerland will remain in the World Group in 2018.
- Hungary, Kazakhstan and Netherlands are promoted to the World Group in 2018.
- Belarus, Brazil, Colombia, India and Portugal will remain in Zonal Group I in 2018.
- Argentina, Czech Republic and Russia are relegated to Zonal Group I in 2018.

== Playoff results ==
=== Kazakhstan vs. Argentina ===
Kazakhstan
3
National Tennis Center, Astana, Kazakhstan
15–17 September 2017
Hard (i)

Argentina
2

			1	2	3	4	5
1	(Kazakhstan) (Argentina)	**Mikhail Kukushkin**; Guido Pella	6^{5} **7^{7}**	**7^{7}** 6^{5}	**6**; 2	**6**; 4
2	(Kazakhstan) (Argentina)	Dmitry Popko; **Diego Schwartzman**	4; **6**	2; **6**	2; **6**
3	(Kazakhstan) (Argentina)	**Timur Khabibulin / Aleksandr Nedovyesov**; Máximo González / Andrés Molteni	5; **7**	**6**; 4	**7**; 5	**6**; 4
4	(Kazakhstan) (Argentina)	**Mikhail Kukushkin**; Diego Schwartzman	**6**; 4	**6**; 4	**7^{7}** 6^{2}
5	(Kazakhstan) (Argentina)	Dmitry Popko; **Guido Pella**						**w/o**

=== Colombia vs. Croatia ===
Colombia
1
Plaza de Toros la Santamaría, Bogotá, Colombia
15–17 September 2017
Clay

Croatia
4

			1	2	3	4	5
1	(Colombia) (Croatia)	Alejandro González; **Marin Čilić**	1; **6**	4; **6**	1; **6**
2	(Colombia) (Croatia)	**Santiago Giraldo**; Franko Škugor	**6**; 4	4; **6**	5; **7**	**6**; 4	**6**; 2
3	(Colombia) (Croatia)	Juan Sebastián Cabal / Alejandro Falla; **Marin Čilić / Nikola Mektić**	**7**; 5	**7^{7}** 6^{5}	4; **6**	2; **6**	4; **6**
4	(Colombia) (Croatia)	Santiago Giraldo; **Marin Čilić**	3; **6**	4; **6**	4; **6**
5	(Colombia) (Croatia)	Alejandro González; **Viktor Galović**	4; **6**	**6**; 2	2; **6**

=== Switzerland vs. Belarus ===
Switzerland
3
Swiss Tennis Arena, Biel/Bienne, Switzerland
15–17 September 2017
Hard (i)

Belarus
2

			1	2	3	4	5
1	(Switzerland) (Belarus)	Henri Laaksonen; **Yaraslav Shyla**	4; **6**	2; **6**	6^{3} **7^{7}**
2	(Switzerland) (Belarus)	**Marco Chiudinelli**; Dzmitry Zhyrmont	**6**; 3	4; **6**	**6**; 4	**6**; 3
3	(Switzerland) (Belarus)	Adrian Bodmer / Luca Margaroli; **Max Mirnyi / Andrei Vasilevski**	6^{6} **7^{8}**	6^{4} **7^{7}**	6^{3} **7^{7}**
4	(Switzerland) (Belarus)	**Henri Laaksonen**; Dzmitry Zhyrmont	**6**; 2	**6**; 2	5; **7**	**6**; 2
5	(Switzerland) (Belarus)	**Marco Chiudinelli**; Yaraslav Shyla	**6**; 4	**6**; 3	**6**; 4

=== Netherlands vs. Czech Republic ===
Netherlands
3
Sportcampus Zuiderpark, The Hague, Netherlands
15–17 September 2017
Clay (i)

Czech Republic
2

			1	2	3	4	5
1	(Netherlands) (Czech Republic)	Thiemo de Bakker; **Jiří Veselý**	**6**; 4	3; **6**	**6**; 4	4; **6**	4; **6**
2	(Netherlands) (Czech Republic)	Robin Haase; **Lukáš Rosol**	**7^{7}** 6^{5}	3; **6**	2; **6**	**6**; 3	5; **7**
3	(Netherlands) (Czech Republic)	**Robin Haase / Matwé Middelkoop**; Roman Jebavý / Adam Pavlásek	4; **6**	**6**; 4	**7^{7}** 6^{1}	**6**; 4
4	(Netherlands) (Czech Republic)	**Robin Haase**; Jiří Veselý	**6**; 1	1; **6**	**6**; 3	**6**; 4
5	(Netherlands) (Czech Republic)	**Thiemo de Bakker**; Lukáš Rosol	3; **6**	**6**; 4	**6**; 4	**6**; 4

=== Portugal vs. Germany ===
Portugal
2
Clube de Ténis do Jamor, Oeiras, Portugal
15–17 September 2017
Clay

Germany
3

			1	2	3	4	5
1	(Portugal) (Germany)	João Sousa; **Cedrik-Marcel Stebe**	**6**; 4	3; **6**	3; **6**	0; **6**
2	(Portugal) (Germany)	**Pedro Sousa**; Jan-Lennard Struff	**6**; 2	**7**; 5	**7^{7}** 6^{4}
3	(Portugal) (Germany)	Gastão Elias / João Sousa; **Tim Pütz / Jan-Lennard Struff**	2; **6**	**6**; 4	**7^{7}** 6^{5}	4; **6**	4; **6**
4	(Portugal) (Germany)	João Sousa; **Jan-Lennard Struff**	0; **6**	**7^{7}** 6^{3}	**6**; 3	6^{6} **7^{8}**	4; **6**
5	(Portugal) (Germany)	**João Domingues**; Yannick Hanfmann	**6**; 3	**7^{10}** 6^{8}

=== Japan vs. Brazil ===
Japan
3
Utsubo Tennis Center, Osaka, Japan
15–18 September 2017
Hard

Brazil
1

			1	2	3	4	5
1	(Japan) (Brazil)	**Yūichi Sugita**; Guilherme Clezar	**6**; 2	**7**; 5	**7^{7}** 6^{5}
2	(Japan) (Brazil)	**Go Soeda**; Thiago Monteiro	3; **6**	**6**; 4	**6**; 3	6^{1} **7^{7}**	**6**; 4
3	(Japan) (Brazil)	Ben McLachlan / Yasutaka Uchiyama; **Marcelo Melo / Bruno Soares**	6^{2} **7^{7}**	4; **6**	2; **6**
4	(Japan) (Brazil)	**Yūichi Sugita**; Thiago Monteiro	**6**; 3	**6**; 2	**6**; 3
5	(Japan) (Brazil)	Go Soeda; Guilherme Clezar						**not** **played**

=== Hungary vs. Russia ===
Hungary
3
Kopaszi Dam, Budapest, Hungary
15–17 September 2017
Clay

Russia
1

			1	2	3	4	5
1	(Hungary) (Russia)	**Márton Fucsovics**; Andrey Rublev	**6**; 2	**6**; 4	5; **7**	2; **6**	**6**; 3
2	(Hungary) (Russia)	Attila Balázs; **Karen Khachanov**	**6**; 3	2; **6**	6^{12} **7^{14}**	1; **6**
3	(Hungary) (Russia)	**Attila Balázs / Márton Fucsovics**; Konstantin Kravchuk / Daniil Medvedev	**7^{7}** 6^{4}	**6**; 4	**7^{7}** 6^{4}
4	(Hungary) (Russia)	**Márton Fucsovics**; Karen Khachanov	**7**; 5	**6**; 4	**6**; 4
5	(Hungary) (Russia)	Attila Balázs; Andrey Rublev						**not** **played**

=== Canada vs. India ===
Canada
3
Northlands Coliseum, Edmonton, Canada
15–17 September 2017
Hard (i)

India
2

			1	2	3	4	5
1	(Canada) (India)	Brayden Schnur; **Ramkumar Ramanathan**	**7**; 5	6^{4} **7^{7}**	5; **7**	5; **7**
2	(Canada) (India)	**Denis Shapovalov**; Yuki Bhambri	**7^{7}** 6^{2}	**6**; 4	6^{6} **7^{8}**	4; **6**	**6**; 1
3	(Canada) (India)	**Daniel Nestor / Vasek Pospisil**; Rohan Bopanna / Purav Raja	**7**; 5	**7**; 5	5; **7**	**6**; 3
4	(Canada) (India)	**Denis Shapovalov**; Ramkumar Ramanathan	**6**; 3	**7^{7}** 6^{1}	**6**; 3
5	(Canada) (India)	Brayden Schnur; **Yuki Bhambri**	4; **6**	**6**; 4	4; **6**
