= 2020 Bangkok Challenger – Doubles =

Doubles
- 2020 Bangkok Challenger

Final
- Champions: (Kazakhstan) Andrey Golubev (Kazakhstan) Aleksandr Nedovyesov
- Runners-up: (Thailand) Sanchai Ratiwatana (Indonesia) Christopher Rungkat
- Score: 3–6, 7–6^{(7–1)}, [10–5]

Events
Singles	Doubles
- Bangkok Challenger

Gong Maoxin and Zhang Ze were the defending champions but lost in the first round to Treat Huey and Nathaniel Lammons.

Andrey Golubev and Aleksandr Nedovyesov won the title after defeating Sanchai Ratiwatana and Christopher Rungkat 3–6, 7–6^{(7–1)}, [10–5] in the final.

== Seeds ==
1. (Ecuador) Gonzalo Escobar / (Mexico) Miguel Ángel Reyes-Varela (semifinals)
2. (Monaco) Romain Arneodo / (Germany) Andre Begemann (quarterfinals)
3. (Bosnia and Herzegovina) Tomislav Brkić / (Croatia) Ante Pavić (first round)
4. (India) Purav Raja / (Canada) Adil Shamasdin (first round)

== Draw ==
Key

- Q = Qualifier
- WC = Wild card
- LL = Lucky loser
- Alt = Alternate
- ITF = ITF entry
- PR = Protected ranking
- SR = Special ranking
- SE = Special exempt
- JE = Junior exempt
- JR = Junior Accelerator Programme entrant
- CO = College Accelerator Programme entrant
- NG = Next Gen Accelerator Program entrant
- w/o = Walkover
- r = Retired
- d = Defaulted

First round
1	(Ecuador) G Escobar (Mexico) MÁ Reyes-Varela	7	7
(France) S Doumbia (France) F Reboul	5	5
(Philippines) T Huey (United States) N Lammons	6	6
(China) M Gong (China) Ze Zhang	3	4
4	(India) P Raja (Canada) A Shamasdin	6^{5}	6	[6]
(United States) E King (United States) H Reese	7^{7}	3	[10]
WC	(Kazakhstan) A Golubev (Kazakhstan) A Nedovyesov	6	3	[10]
(Finland) H Heliövaara (Netherlands) D Pel	2	6	[6]
(Portugal) G Oliveira (Chinese Taipei) T-h Yang	3	3
(India) S Balaji (India) J Nedunchezhiyan	6	6
(United States) JC Aragone (Venezuela) LD Martínez	6	6
3	(Bosnia and Herzegovina) T Brkić (Croatia) A Pavić	4	4
WC	(Thailand) So Ratiwatana (Thailand) W Trongcharoenchaikul	4	3
(Thailand) Sa Ratiwatana (Indonesia) C Rungkat	6	6
WC	(Thailand) P Kovapitukted (Thailand) K Samrej	4	4
2	(Monaco) R Arneodo (Germany) A Begemann	6	6

Quarterfinals
1	(Ecuador) G Escobar (Mexico) MÁ Reyes-Varela	6	6
(Philippines) T Huey (United States) N Lammons	4	4
(United States) E King (United States) H Reese	5	1
WC	(Kazakhstan) A Golubev (Kazakhstan) A Nedovyesov	7	6
(India) S Balaji (India) J Nedunchezhiyan	7^{7}	6
(United States) JC Aragone (Venezuela) LD Martínez	6^{3}	1
(Thailand) Sa Ratiwatana (Indonesia) C Rungkat	6	6^{8}	[10]
2	(Monaco) R Arneodo (Germany) A Begemann	4	7^{10}	[8]

Semifinals
1	(Ecuador) G Escobar (Mexico) MÁ Reyes-Varela	6^{3}	3
WC	(Kazakhstan) A Golubev (Kazakhstan) A Nedovyesov	7^{7}	6
(India) S Balaji (India) J Nedunchezhiyan	4	7^{7}	[7]
(Thailand) Sa Ratiwatana (Indonesia) C Rungkat	6	6^{2}	[10]

Final
WC	(Kazakhstan) A Golubev (Kazakhstan) A Nedovyesov	3	7^{7}	[10]
(Thailand) Sa Ratiwatana (Indonesia) C Rungkat	6	6^{1}	[5]
