= 2020 Erste Bank Open – Singles =

Singles
- 2020 Erste Bank Open

Final
- Champion: (Russia) Andrey Rublev
- Runner-up: (Italy) Lorenzo Sonego
- Score: 6–4, 6–4

Details
- Draw: 32 (4 Q / 3 WC )
- Seeds: 8

Events
Singles	Doubles
- Vienna Open

Dominic Thiem was the defending champion, but lost to Andrey Rublev in the quarterfinals.

Rublev went on to win the title, defeating Lorenzo Sonego in the final, 6–4, 6–4. With his win over Novak Djokovic in the second round, Sonego became the first lucky loser to defeat a reigning world No. 1.

== Seeds ==
1. (Serbia) Novak Djokovic (quarterfinals)
2. (Austria) Dominic Thiem (quarterfinals)
3. (Greece) Stefanos Tsitsipas (second round)
4. (Russia) Daniil Medvedev (quarterfinals)
5. (Russia) Andrey Rublev (champion)
6. (Argentina) Diego Schwartzman (withdrew)
7. (France) Gaël Monfils (first round, retired)
8. (Canada) Denis Shapovalov (first round)

== Draw ==
Key

- Q = Qualifier
- WC = Wild card
- LL = Lucky loser
- Alt = Alternate
- ITF = ITF entry
- PR = Protected ranking
- SR = Special ranking
- SE = Special exempt
- JE = Junior exempt
- JR = Junior Accelerator Programme entrant
- CO = College Accelerator Programme entrant
- NG = Next Gen Accelerator Program entrant
- w/o = Walkover
- r = Retired
- d = Defaulted

=== Finals ===
Semifinals
LL	(Italy) Lorenzo Sonego	6	6
SE	(United Kingdom) Dan Evans	3	4
PR	(South Africa) Kevin Anderson	4	1^{r}
5	(Russia) Andrey Rublev	6	4

Final
LL	(Italy) Lorenzo Sonego	4	4
5	(Russia) Andrey Rublev	6	6

=== Top half ===
First round
1/WC	(Serbia) N Djokovic	7^{8}	6
(Serbia) F Krajinović	6^{6}	3
(Croatia) B Ćorić	6	6
(United States) T Fritz	4	4
(Poland) H Hurkacz	6	7
Q	(Hungary) A Balázs	3	5
(Serbia) D Lajović	4	3
LL	(Italy) L Sonego	6	6
3	(Greece) S Tsitsipas	6^{3}	6	6
(Germany) J-L Struff	7^{7}	3	4
(Bulgaria) G Dimitrov	7^{8}	6
(Russia) K Khachanov	6^{6}	3
Q	(Slovenia) A Bedene	3	5^{r}
SE	(United Kingdom) D Evans	6	4
WC	(Austria) J Rodionov	6	7
8	(Canada) D Shapovalov	4	5

Second round
1/WC	(Serbia) N Djokovic	7^{13}	6
(Croatia) B Ćorić	6^{11}	3
(Poland) H Hurkacz	6^{6}	6^{2}
LL	(Italy) L Sonego	7^{8}	7^{7}
3	(Greece) S Tsitsipas	7^{7}	4	3
(Bulgaria) G Dimitrov	6^{5}	6	6
SE	(United Kingdom) D Evans	7	6
WC	(Austria) J Rodionov	5	3

Quarterfinals
1/WC	(Serbia) N Djokovic	2	1
LL	(Italy) L Sonego	6	6
(Bulgaria) G Dimitrov	6^{3}	6	3
SE	(United Kingdom) D Evans	7^{7}	4	6

Semifinals
LL	(Italy) L Sonego	6	6
SE	(United Kingdom) D Evans	3	4

=== Bottom half ===
First round
7	(France) G Monfils	1	0^{r}
(Spain) P Carreño Busta	6	2
WC	(Austria) D Novak	7^{7}	4	6^{6}
PR	(South Africa) K Anderson	6^{2}	6	7^{8}
(Canada) F Auger-Aliassime	5	5
Q	(Canada) V Pospisil	7	7
LL	(Chinese Taipei) J Jung	3	1
4	(Russia) D Medvedev	6	6
5	(Russia) A Rublev	6	6
Q	(Slovakia) N Gombos	3	2
(Norway) C Ruud	6^{2}	3
WC	(Italy) J Sinner	7^{7}	6
(Chile) C Garín	6	6^{9}	6
(Switzerland) S Wawrinka	4	7^{11}	3
LL	(Ukraine) V Sachko	4	5
2	(Austria) D Thiem	6	7

Second round
(Spain) P Carreño Busta	5	1
PR	(South Africa) K Anderson	7	6
Q	(Canada) V Pospisil	6	3	2
4	(Russia) D Medvedev	4	6	6
5	(Russia) A Rublev	2
WC	(Italy) J Sinner	1^{r}
(Chile) C Garín	3	2
2	(Austria) D Thiem	6	6

Quarterfinals
PR	(South Africa) K Anderson	6	7^{7}
4	(Russia) D Medvedev	4	6^{5}
5	(Russia) A Rublev	7^{7}	6
2	(Austria) D Thiem	6^{5}	2

Semifinals
PR	(South Africa) K Anderson	4	1^{r}
5	(Russia) A Rublev	6	4

== Qualifying ==
=== Seeds ===
1. (Germany) Jan-Lennard Struff (moved to main draw)
2. (Georgia (country)) Nikoloz Basilashvili (first round)
3. (Italy) Lorenzo Sonego (qualifying competition, lucky loser)
4. (United Kingdom) Kyle Edmund (first round)
5. (Slovenia) Aljaž Bedene (qualified)
6. (Canada) Vasek Pospisil (qualified)
7. (France) Pierre-Hugues Herbert (first round)
8. (Hungary) Attila Balázs (qualified)

=== Qualifiers ===
1. (Hungary) Attila Balázs
2. (Slovakia) Norbert Gombos
3. (Slovenia) Aljaž Bedene
4. (Canada) Vasek Pospisil

=== Lucky losers ===
1. (Italy) Lorenzo Sonego
2. (Chinese Taipei) Jason Jung
3. (Ukraine) Vitaliy Sachko

=== Qualifying draw ===
==== First qualifier ====
First round				Qualifying competition
				Alt	(Brazil) Bruno Soares	2	4
				8	(Hungary) Attila Balázs	6	6
Alt	(United States) Rajeev Ram	5	1	8	(Hungary) Attila Balázs	6	6
8	(Hungary) Attila Balázs	7	6

==== Second qualifier ====
First round
2	(Georgia (country)) Nikoloz Basilashvili	6^{2}	2
(Slovakia) Norbert Gombos	7^{7}	6
Alt	(Ukraine) Vitaliy Sachko	1	6	6
7	(France) Pierre-Hugues Herbert	6	4	3

Qualifying competition
(Slovakia) Norbert Gombos	5	6	6
Alt	(Ukraine) Vitaliy Sachko	7	4	4

==== Third qualifier ====
First round
3	(Italy) Lorenzo Sonego	6	6
WC	(Austria) Lucas Miedler	4	3
WC	(Austria) David Pichler	0	4
5	(Slovenia) Aljaž Bedene	6	6

Qualifying competition
3	(Italy) Lorenzo Sonego	2	6	5
5	(Slovenia) Aljaž Bedene	6	4	7

==== Fourth qualifier ====
First round
4	(United Kingdom) Kyle Edmund	7^{7}	4	2
(Chinese Taipei) Jason Jung	6^{2}	6	6
WC	(Austria) Alexander Erler	6	3	2
6	(Canada) Vasek Pospisil	3	6	6

Qualifying competition
(Chinese Taipei) Jason Jung	6^{1}	6	3
6	(Canada) Vasek Pospisil	7^{7}	3	6
