= 2018 Gazprom Hungarian Open – Singles =

Singles
- 2018 Gazprom Hungarian Open

Final
- Champion: (Italy) Marco Cecchinato
- Runner-up: (Australia) John Millman
- Score: 7–5, 6–4

Details
- Draw: 28 (4 Q / 2 WC )
- Seeds: 8

Events
| Singles | Doubles |
| ← 2017 · | Gazprom Hungarian Open | · 2019 → |

Lucas Pouille was the defending champion, but lost in the second round to John Millman.

Marco Cecchinato won his first ATP title, defeating Millman in the final, 7–5, 6–4. Cecchinato was a lucky loser, the ninth in ATP Tour history to win a title.

== Seeds ==
The top four seeds received a bye into the second round.

1. (France) Lucas Pouille (second round)
2. (Bosnia and Herzegovina) Damir Džumhur (second round)
3. (France) Richard Gasquet (second round)
4. (Canada) Denis Shapovalov (second round)
5. (Slovenia) Aljaž Bedene (semifinals)
6. (Hungary) Márton Fucsovics (first round)
7. (Germany) Jan-Lennard Struff (quarterfinals)
8. (Italy) Andreas Seppi (semifinals)

== Draw ==
=== Key ===
- Q = Qualifier
- WC = Wild card
- LL = Lucky loser
- Alt = Alternate
- SE = Special exempt
- PR = Protected ranking
- ITF = ITF entry
- JE = Junior exempt
- w/o = Walkover
- r = Retired
- d = Defaulted
- SR = Special ranking

=== Finals ===
Semifinals
(Australia) John Millman | 2 | 7^{7} | 7^{7}
5 | (Slovenia) Aljaž Bedene | 6 | 6^{3} | 6^{5}
8 | (Italy) Andreas Seppi | 7 | 6^{4} | 3
LL | (Italy) Marco Cecchinato | 5 | 7^{7} | 6

Final
(Australia) John Millman | 5 | 4
LL | (Italy) Marco Cecchinato | 7 | 6

=== Top half ===
First round
(Australia) J Millman | 6 | 7
(Moldova) R Albot | 4 | 5
(Germany) M Marterer | 3 | 6 | 6
(Serbia) V Troicki | 6 | 4 | 4
LL | (Germany) Y Maden | 4 | 6 | 6
6 | (Hungary) M Fucsovics | 6 | 3 | 2
Q | (Poland) H Hurkacz | 7^{7} | 6^{8} | 4
Q | (Italy) L Sonego | 6^{2} | 7^{10} | 6
WC | (Hungary) A Balázs | 4 | 6 | 6^{4}
Q | (Italy) M Berrettini | 6 | 3 | 7^{7}
(Romania) M Copil | 7^{7} | 5 | 3
5 | (Slovenia) A Bedene | 6^{3} | 7 | 6

Second round
1 | (France) L Pouille | 3 | 4
(Australia) J Millman | 6 | 6
(Germany) M Marterer | 1 | 3
LL | (Germany) Y Maden | 6 | 6
3 | (France) R Gasquet | 4 | 6^{4}
Q | (Italy) L Sonego | 6 | 7^{7}
Q | (Italy) M Berrettini | 6^{2} | 6 | 4
5 | (Slovenia) A Bedene | 7^{7} | 4 | 6

Quarterfinals
(Australia) J Millman | 2 | 6 | 6
LL | (Germany) Y Maden | 6 | 1 | 4
Q | (Italy) L Sonego | 3 | 6 | 2
5 | (Slovenia) A Bedene | 6 | 2 | 6

Semifinals
(Australia) J Millman | 2 | 7^{7} | 7^{7}
5 | (Slovenia) A Bedene | 6 | 6^{3} | 6^{5}

=== Bottom half ===
First round
8 | (Italy) A Seppi | 4 | 7 | 6
(Italy) T Fabbiano | 6 | 5 | 3
WC | (Hungary) Z Piros | 3 | 3
(Russia) M Youzhny | 6 | 6
(Georgia (country)) N Basilashvili | 6 | 6
(Italy) P Lorenzi | 4 | 2
7 | (Germany) J-L Struff | 2 | 6 | 7
Q | (Estonia) J Zopp | 6 | 4 | 5
WC | (Kazakhstan) A Bublik | 6^{6} | 7^{7} | 7
(Uzbekistan) D Istomin | 7^{8} | 6^{5} | 5
(Bosnia and Herzegovina) M Bašić | 3 | 4
LL | (Italy) M Cecchinato | 6 | 6

Second round
8 | (Italy) A Seppi | 6 | 6
(Russia) M Youzhny | 1 | 2
(Georgia (country)) N Basilashvili | 6 | 6
4 | (Canada) D Shapovalov | 2 | 4
7 | (Germany) J-L Struff | 6 | 6
WC | (Kazakhstan) A Bublik | 1 | 4
LL | (Italy) M Cecchinato | 6 | 6
2 | (Bosnia and Herzegovina) D Džumhur | 3 | 1

Quarterfinals
8 | (Italy) A Seppi | 6 | 7^{7}
(Georgia (country)) N Basilashvili | 4 | 6^{3}
7 | (Germany) J-L Struff | 7 | 4 | 2
LL | (Italy) M Cecchinato | 5 | 6 | 6

Semifinals
8 | (Italy) A Seppi | 7 | 6^{4} | 3
LL | (Italy) M Cecchinato | 5 | 7^{7} | 6

== Qualifying ==
=== Seeds ===
1. (Cyprus) Marcos Baghdatis (first round)
2. (Italy) Marco Cecchinato (qualifying competition, lucky loser)
3. (Italy) Matteo Berrettini (qualified)
4. (Austria) Gerald Melzer (first round)
5. (Ukraine) Sergiy Stakhovsky (first round)
6. (United States) Tim Smyczek (first round)
7. (Brazil) Thiago Monteiro (qualifying competition)
8. (Germany) Yannick Maden (qualifying competition, lucky loser)

=== Qualifiers ===
1. (Poland) Hubert Hurkacz
2. (Estonia) Jürgen Zopp
3. (Italy) Matteo Berrettini
4. (Italy) Lorenzo Sonego

=== Lucky losers ===
1. (Italy) Marco Cecchinato
2. (Germany) Yannick Maden

=== Qualifying draw ===
==== First qualifier ====
First round
1 | (Cyprus) Marcos Baghdatis | 2 | 4
(Poland) Hubert Hurkacz | 6 | 6
(Italy) Stefano Napolitano | 1 | 4
7 | (Brazil) Thiago Monteiro | 6 | 6

Qualifying competition
(Poland) Hubert Hurkacz | 2 | 7 | 6
7 | (Brazil) Thiago Monteiro | 6 | 5 | 3

==== Second qualifier ====
First round
2 | (Italy) Marco Cecchinato | 7 | 6
WC | (Hungary) Máté Valkusz | 5 | 1
(Estonia) Jürgen Zopp | 1 | 6 | 6
6 | (United States) Tim Smyczek | 6 | 4 | 4

Qualifying competition
2 | (Italy) Marco Cecchinato | 4 | 2
(Estonia) Jürgen Zopp | 6 | 6

==== Third qualifier ====
First round
3 | (Italy) Matteo Berrettini | 6 | 6
WC | (Hungary) Péter Nagy | 3 | 4
(Sweden) Elias Ymer | 6 | 6
5 | (Ukraine) Sergiy Stakhovsky | 3 | 3

Qualifying competition
3 | (Italy) Matteo Berrettini | 6 | 7
(Sweden) Elias Ymer | 4 | 5

==== Fourth qualifier ====
First round
4 | (Austria) Gerald Melzer | 3 | 2
(Italy) Lorenzo Sonego | 6 | 6
(Austria) Sebastian Ofner | 1 | 1
8 | (Germany) Yannick Maden | 6 | 6

Qualifying competition
(Italy) Lorenzo Sonego | 6 | 6
8 | (Germany) Yannick Maden | 4 | 4
