= 2018 Prosperita Open – Doubles =

Doubles
- 2018 Prosperita Open

Final
- Champions: (Hungary) Attila Balázs (Portugal) Gonçalo Oliveira
- Runners-up: (Czech Republic) Lukáš Rosol (Ukraine) Sergiy Stakhovsky
- Score: 6–0, 7–5

Events
| Singles | Doubles |
- Prosperita Open

Jeevan Nedunchezhiyan and Franko Škugor were the defending champions but chose not to defend their title.

Attila Balázs and Gonçalo Oliveira won the title after defeating Lukáš Rosol and Sergiy Stakhovsky 6–0, 7–5 in the final.

== Seeds ==
1. (Poland) Tomasz Bednarek / (Germany) Andreas Mies (semifinals)
2. (Australia) Rameez Junaid / (Netherlands) David Pel (quarterfinals)
3. (Italy) Alessandro Motti / (Poland) Grzegorz Panfil (quarterfinals)
4. (Hungary) Attila Balázs / (Portugal) Gonçalo Oliveira (champions)

== Draw ==
Key

- Q = Qualifier
- WC = Wild card
- LL = Lucky loser
- Alt = Alternate
- ITF = ITF entry
- PR = Protected ranking
- SR = Special ranking
- SE = Special exempt
- JE = Junior exempt
- JR = Junior Accelerator Programme entrant
- CO = College Accelerator Programme entrant
- NG = Next Gen Accelerator Program entrant
- w/o = Walkover
- r = Retired
- d = Defaulted

First round
1 | (Poland) T Bednarek (Germany) A Mies | 6^{5} | 6 | [12]
(Bosnia and Herzegovina) T Brkić (Croatia) N Serdarušić | 7^{7} | 1 | [10]
(Spain) P Martínez (India) S Nagal | 6 | 6^{6} | [10]
(Czech Republic) Z Kolář (Czech Republic) A Pavlásek | 3 | 7^{8} | [3]
3 | (Italy) A Motti (Poland) G Panfil | 6 | 6
WC | (Czech Republic) M Gengel (Czech Republic) M Vocel | 3 | 3
(France) A Hoang (France) G Sakharov | 6 | 6^{3} | [11]
(Czech Republic) L Rosol (Ukraine) S Stakhovsky | 4 | 7^{7} | [13]
WC | (Belgium) G Gigounon (Czech Republic) D Kellovský | 5 | 1
WC | (Czech Republic) Petr Michnev (Czech Republic) D Poljak | 7 | 6
(Italy) J Ocleppo (Italy) A Vavassori | 6 | 3 | [6]
4 | (Hungary) A Balázs (Portugal) G Oliveira | 3 | 6 | [10]
Alt | (France) B Bonzi (Netherlands) M Vervoort | 6 | 6
(Russia) I Gakhov (Italy) L Giustino | 4 | 3
(Belgium) R Bemelmans (Netherlands) T Griekspoor | 3 | 1
2 | (Australia) R Junaid (Netherlands) D Pel | 6 | 6

Quarterfinals
1 | (Poland) T Bednarek (Germany) A Mies | 6 | 6
(Spain) P Martínez (India) S Nagal | 2 | 4
3 | (Italy) A Motti (Poland) G Panfil | 6^{5} | 2
(Czech Republic) L Rosol (Ukraine) S Stakhovsky | 7^{7} | 6
WC | (Czech Republic) P Michnev (Czech Republic) D Poljak | 5 | 4
4 | (Hungary) A Balázs (Portugal) G Oliveira | 7 | 6
Alt | (France) B Bonzi (Netherlands) M Vervoort | 7 | 6
2 | (Australia) R Junaid (Netherlands) D Pel | 5 | 3

Semifinals
1 | (Poland) T Bednarek (Germany) A Mies | 5 | 3
(Czech Republic) L Rosol (Ukraine) S Stakhovsky | 7 | 6
4 | (Hungary) A Balázs (Portugal) G Oliveira | 5 | 6 | [10]
Alt | (France) B Bonzi (Netherlands) M Vervoort | 7 | 2 | [8]

Final
(Czech Republic) L Rosol (Ukraine) S Stakhovsky | 0 | 5
4 | (Hungary) A Balázs (Portugal) G Oliveira | 6 | 7
