= 2019 Hungarian Open (tennis) =

- Date: April 23 – 29
- Edition: 3rd
- Category: ATP Tour 250 series
- Draw: 28S / 16D
- Prize money: €524,340
- Surface: Clay / outdoor
- Location: Budapest, Hungary
- Venue: Sport11, Sport and Event Center

Champions

Singles
- (Italy) Matteo Berrettini

Doubles
- (United Kingdom) Ken Skupski / (United Kingdom) Neal Skupski
← 2018 ·	Hungarian Open (tennis)	· 2020 →

The 2019 Hungarian Open was a men's tennis tournament to be played on outdoor clay courts. It was the 3rd edition of the event, and part of the ATP Tour 250 series of the 2019 ATP Tour. It took place at Sport 11 in Budapest, Hungary, from April 22–28.

== Singles main-draw entrants ==
=== Seeds ===
Country	Player	Rank^{1}	Seed
CRO	Marin Čilić	11	1
CRO	Borna Ćorić	13	2
~~ITA~~	~~Marco Cecchinato~~	~~16~~	~~3~~
GEO	Nikoloz Basilashvili	17	4
SRB	Laslo Đere	32	5
AUS	John Millman	39	6
KAZ	Mikhail Kukushkin	42	7
MDA	Radu Albot	45	8

- ^{1} Rankings are as of April 15, 2019

=== Other entrants ===
The following players received wildcards into the singles main draw:

- (Hungary) Attila Balázs
- (Croatia) Marin Čilić
- (Hungary) Máté Valkusz

The following players received entry from the qualifying draw:

- (South Africa) Lloyd Harris
- (Serbia) Miomir Kecmanović
- (Serbia) Filip Krajinović
- (Germany) Yannick Maden

The following players received entry as lucky losers:

- (Germany) Matthias Bachinger
- (Belarus) Egor Gerasimov
- (Italy) Jannik Sinner
- (Ukraine) Sergiy Stakhovsky

=== Withdrawals ===
- (Italy) Marco Cecchinato → replaced by (Germany) Matthias Bachinger
- (Bosnia and Herzegovina) Damir Džumhur → replaced by (Belarus) Egor Gerasimov
- (Serbia) Dušan Lajović → replaced by (Italy) Jannik Sinner
- (France) Adrian Mannarino → replaced by (Ukraine) Sergiy Stakhovsky

== Doubles main-draw entrants ==
=== Seeds ===
Country	Player	Country	Player	Rank^{1}	Seed
IND	Rohan Bopanna	GBR	Dominic Inglot	61	1
MEX	Santiago González	NED	Matwé Middelkoop	84	2
GBR	Ken Skupski	GBR	Neal Skupski	89	3
NED	Robin Haase	DEN	Frederik Nielsen	91	4

- ^{1} Rankings are as of April 15, 2019

=== Other entrants ===
The following pairs received wildcards into the doubles main draw:

- (Hungary) Gábor Borsos / (Hungary) Péter Nagy
- (Hungary) Máté Valkusz / (Serbia) Nenad Zimonjić

The following pairs received entry as alternates:

- (Germany) Andre Begemann / (Latvia) Ernests Gulbis
- (Italy) Thomas Fabbiano / (Australia) John Millman

=== Withdrawals ===
- (Italy) Marco Cecchinato
- (Serbia) Dušan Lajović

== Champions ==
=== Singles ===
- (Italy) Matteo Berrettini def. (Serbia) Filip Krajinović, 4–6, 6–3, 6–1

=== Doubles ===
- (United Kingdom) Ken Skupski / (United Kingdom) Neal Skupski def. (New Zealand) Marcus Daniell / (Netherlands) Wesley Koolhof, 6–3, 6–4
