= 2020 Bangkok Challenger – Singles =

Singles
- 2020 Bangkok Challenger

Final
- Champion: (Hungary) Attila Balázs
- Runner-up: (Russia) Aslan Karatsev
- Score: 7–6^{(7–5)}, 0–6, 7–6^{(8–6)}

Events
| Singles | Doubles |
- Bangkok Challenger

Henri Laaksonen was the defending champion but chose not to defend his title.

Attila Balázs won the title after defeating Aslan Karatsev 7–6^{(7–5)}, 0–6, 7–6^{(8–6)} in the final.

== Seeds ==
All seeds receive a bye into the second round.

1. (Czech Republic) Jiří Veselý (second round)
2. (Hungary) Attila Balázs (champion)
3. (Netherlands) Robin Haase (second round)
4. (Uzbekistan) Denis Istomin (third round)
5. (Tunisia) Malek Jaziri (second round)
6. (Russia) Roman Safiullin (semifinals)
7. (Ukraine) Illya Marchenko (second round)
8. (Russia) Evgeny Karlovskiy (quarterfinals)
9. (Italy) Gian Marco Moroni (semifinals)
10. (Argentina) Renzo Olivo (third round)
11. (Russia) Teymuraz Gabashvili (withdrew)
12. (Portugal) Gonçalo Oliveira (second round)
13. (Colombia) Santiago Giraldo (third round)
14. (United States) JC Aragone (third round)
15. (Croatia) Borna Gojo (quarterfinals)
16. (Germany) Daniel Altmaier (second round)

== Draw ==
Key

- Q = Qualifier
- WC = Wild card
- LL = Lucky loser
- Alt = Alternate
- ITF = ITF entry
- PR = Protected ranking
- SR = Special ranking
- SE = Special exempt
- JE = Junior exempt
- JR = Junior Accelerator Programme entrant
- CO = College Accelerator Programme entrant
- NG = Next Gen Accelerator Program entrant
- w/o = Walkover
- r = Retired
- d = Defaulted

=== Finals ===
Quarterfinals
(Russia) Aslan Karatsev | 6 | 6
(China) Wu Di | 2 | 2
(Italy) Andrea Arnaboldi | 2 | 4
9 | (Italy) Gian Marco Moroni | 6 | 6
6 | (Russia) Roman Safiullin | 6 | 6
15 | (Croatia) Borna Gojo | 4 | 4
8 | (Russia) Evgeny Karlovskiy | 1 | 5
2 | (Hungary) Attila Balázs | 6 | 7

Semifinals
(Russia) Aslan Karatsev | 6 | 6
9 | (Italy) Gian Marco Moroni | 2 | 2
6 | (Russia) Roman Safiullin | 1 | 7^{7} | 6^{5}
2 | (Hungary) Attila Balázs | 6 | 6^{4} | 7^{7}

Final
(Russia) Aslan Karatsev | 6^{5} | 6 | 6^{6}
2 | (Hungary) Attila Balázs | 7^{7} | 0 | 7^{8}

=== Top half ===
==== Section 1 ====
First round
(Russia) A Karatsev | 6 | 6
WC | (Thailand) Congsup Congcar | 0 | 0
WC | (Thailand) W Trongcharoenchaikul | 4 | 2
(Bosnia and Herzegovina) M Bašić | 6 | 6
(Belarus) U Ignatik | 6 | 6^{5} | 0^{r}
Q | (Ukraine) V Orlov | 3 | 7^{7} | 2
(United States) E King | 3 | 2
(China) D Wu | 6 | 6

Second round
1 | (Czech Republic) J Veselý | 4 | 7^{7} | 2
(Russia) A Karatsev | 6 | 6^{0} | 6
(Bosnia and Herzegovina) M Bašić | 7^{7} | 7
16 | (Germany) D Altmaier | 6^{5} | 5
LL | (Bosnia and Herzegovina) T Brkić | 7^{7} | 4 | 1
Q | (Ukraine) V Orlov | 6^{2} | 6 | 6
(China) D Wu | 6 | 7^{7}
7 | (Ukraine) I Marchenko | 1 | 6^{5}

Third round
(Russia) A Karatsev | 6 | 3 | 6
(Bosnia and Herzegovina) M Bašić | 4 | 6 | 4
Q | (Ukraine) V Orlov | 6 | 4 | 3
(China) D Wu | 2 | 6 | 6

Quarterfinals
(Russia) A Karatsev | 6 | 6
(China) D Wu | 2 | 2

==== Section 2 ====
First round
(Turkey) C İlkel | 6 | 4 | 5
(Italy) A Arnaboldi | 3 | 6 | 7
Alt | (France) S Doumbia | 2 | 4
Q | (India) Sidharth Rawat | 6 | 6
(Italy) A Pellegrino | 6 | 3 | 2
(Norway) V Durasovic | 2 | 6 | 6
WC | (Thailand) K Samrej | 1 | 2
(Chinese Taipei) C-h Tseng | 6 | 6

Second round
3 | (Netherlands) R Haase | 3 | 6 | 1
(Italy) A Arnaboldi | 6 | 3 | 6
Q | (India) S Rawat | 6 | 6^{5} | 4
13 | (Colombia) S Giraldo | 3 | 7^{7} | 6
9 | (Italy) GM Moroni | 6 | 7^{9}
(Norway) V Durasovic | 4 | 6^{7}
(Chinese Taipei) C-h Tseng | 6 | 6
5 | (Tunisia) M Jaziri | 3 | 3

Third round
(Italy) A Arnaboldi | 4 | 7^{7} | 6
13 | (Colombia) S Giraldo | 6 | 6^{2} | 4
9 | (Italy) GM Moroni | 3 | 6 | 6
(Chinese Taipei) C-h Tseng | 6 | 4 | 3

Quarterfinals
(Italy) A Arnaboldi | 2 | 4
9 | (Italy) GM Moroni | 6 | 6

=== Bottom half ===
==== Section 3 ====
First round
(Canada) F Peliwo | 7 | 3 | 6
(Ecuador) G Escobar | 5 | 6 | 4
(Chinese Taipei) T-h Yang | 3 | 4
(China) Ze Zhang | 6 | 6
WC | (Thailand) Michael Mathayomchand | 3 | 0
(Kazakhstan) A Nedovyesov | 6 | 6
(United Kingdom) J Draper | 7^{7} | 6
(South Korea) Y-s Chung | 6^{5} | 3

Second round
6 | (Russia) R Safiullin | 6 | 6
(Canada) F Peliwo | 2 | 3
(China) Ze Zhang | 6 | 6
12 | (Portugal) G Oliveira | 4 | 2
15 | (Croatia) B Gojo | 6 | 6
(Kazakhstan) A Nedovyesov | 1 | 4
(United Kingdom) J Draper | 4 | 2
4 | (Uzbekistan) D Istomin | 6 | 6

Third round
6 | (Russia) R Safiullin | 6 | 6
(China) Ze Zhang | 2 | 1
15 | (Croatia) B Gojo | 6 | 6
4 | (Uzbekistan) D Istomin | 3 | 0

Quarterfinals
6 | (Russia) R Safiullin | 6 | 6
15 | (Croatia) B Gojo | 4 | 4

==== Section 4 ====
First round
(Japan) K Uchida | 1 | 6 | 1
(Slovakia) L Klein | 6 | 3 | 6
WC | (Thailand) P Kovapitukted | 2 | 6 | 6
(Turkey) A Çelikbilek | 6 | 2 | 1
(Slovakia) A Molčan | 6 | 6
(Belgium) A De Greef | 2 | 2
(Austria) J Rodionov | 2 | 3
(Kazakhstan) D Yevseyev | 6 | 6

Second round
8 | (Russia) E Karlovskiy | 7^{8} | 6
(Slovakia) L Klein | 6^{6} | 4
WC | (Thailand) P Kovapitukted | 6^{3} | 6^{4}
10 | (Argentina) R Olivo | 7^{7} | 7^{7}
14 | (United States) JC Aragone | 7^{7} | 6
(Slovakia) A Molčan | 6^{2} | 1
(Kazakhstan) D Yevseyev | 3 | 5
2 | (Hungary) A Balázs | 6 | 7

Third round
8 | (Russia) E Karlovskiy | 6 | 7^{7}
10 | (Argentina) R Olivo | 0 | 6^{3}
14 | (United States) JC Aragone | 3 | 6 | 4
2 | (Hungary) A Balázs | 6 | 3 | 6

Quarterfinals
8 | (Russia) E Karlovskiy | 1 | 5
2 | (Hungary) A Balázs | 6 | 7
