= Marco Cecchinato =

Italian tennis player (born 1992)

- Cecchinato at the 2026 Wimbledon Championships
- Country (sports): Italy
- Residence: Palermo, Italy
- Born: 30 September 1992 (age 34) Palermo, Italy
- Height: 1.85 m (6 ft 1 in)
- Turned pro: 2010
- Plays: Right-handed (one-handed backhand)
- Coach: Julian Alonso; Eduardo Nicolas; Massimo Sartori
- Prize money: US $5,382,718

Singles
- Career record: 78–128
- Career titles: 3
- Highest ranking: No. 16 (25 February 2019)
- Current ranking: No. 163 (5 October 2026)

Grand Slam singles results
- Australian Open: 1R (2016, 2019, 2020, 2021, 2022)
- French Open: SF (2018)
- Wimbledon: 1R (2017, 2018, 2019, 2021, 2023)
- US Open: 1R (2015, 2018, 2019, 2020, 2021, 2023)

Doubles
- Career record: 14–56
- Career titles: 0
- Highest ranking: No. 169 (27 June 2016)

Grand Slam doubles results
- Australian Open: 3R (2016)
- French Open: 1R (2018, 2019)
- Wimbledon: 1R (2018, 2023)
- US Open: 2R (2015, 2019)

Team competitions
- Davis Cup: QF (2016)
- Last updated on: 15 October 2026.

Marco Cecchinato (Italian pronunciation: [ˈmarko tʃekkiˈnaːto]; born 30 September 1992) is an Italian professional tennis player. He has a career-high ATP singles ranking of World No. 16 reached on 25 February 2019. On 29 April 2018, he won his first ATP World Tour title at the 2018 Hungarian Open as a lucky loser, becoming the first Sicilian tennis player to win an ATP title. He has played 5 finals and won 3 ATP titles in singles. Cecchinato is a clay specialist, with his best Grand Slam result being a semifinal at the 2018 French Open. At the other Grand Slams, he has not won a match in singles.

== Career ==
=== 2013–2017: ATP and Grand Slam debut ===
In May 2013, Cecchinato qualified for the main draw at the ATP tournament in Nice, losing to countryman and No. 6 seed, Fabio Fognini, in the first round.

In July 2014, Cecchinato qualified for Umag, where he played another countryman and No. 6 seed, Andreas Seppi, in the first round. Cecchinato lost the match in three sets.

Cecchinato then made his Grand Slam debut at the 2015 US Open.

On 20 July 2016, Cecchinato was suspended for 18 months (until January 2018) and fined €40,000 by the Italian tennis federation for illegal behavior including match fixing and match betting. The ban was overturned and declared a mistrial after the prosecutors took too long to complete the initial trial phase. Despite this, Cecchinato admitted to telling potential bettors of his poor physical state prior to a match.

Cecchinato reached his first ATP quarterfinal at the 2016 Romanian Open.

=== 2018: First two ATP titles, French Open semifinal, Top 20 ===
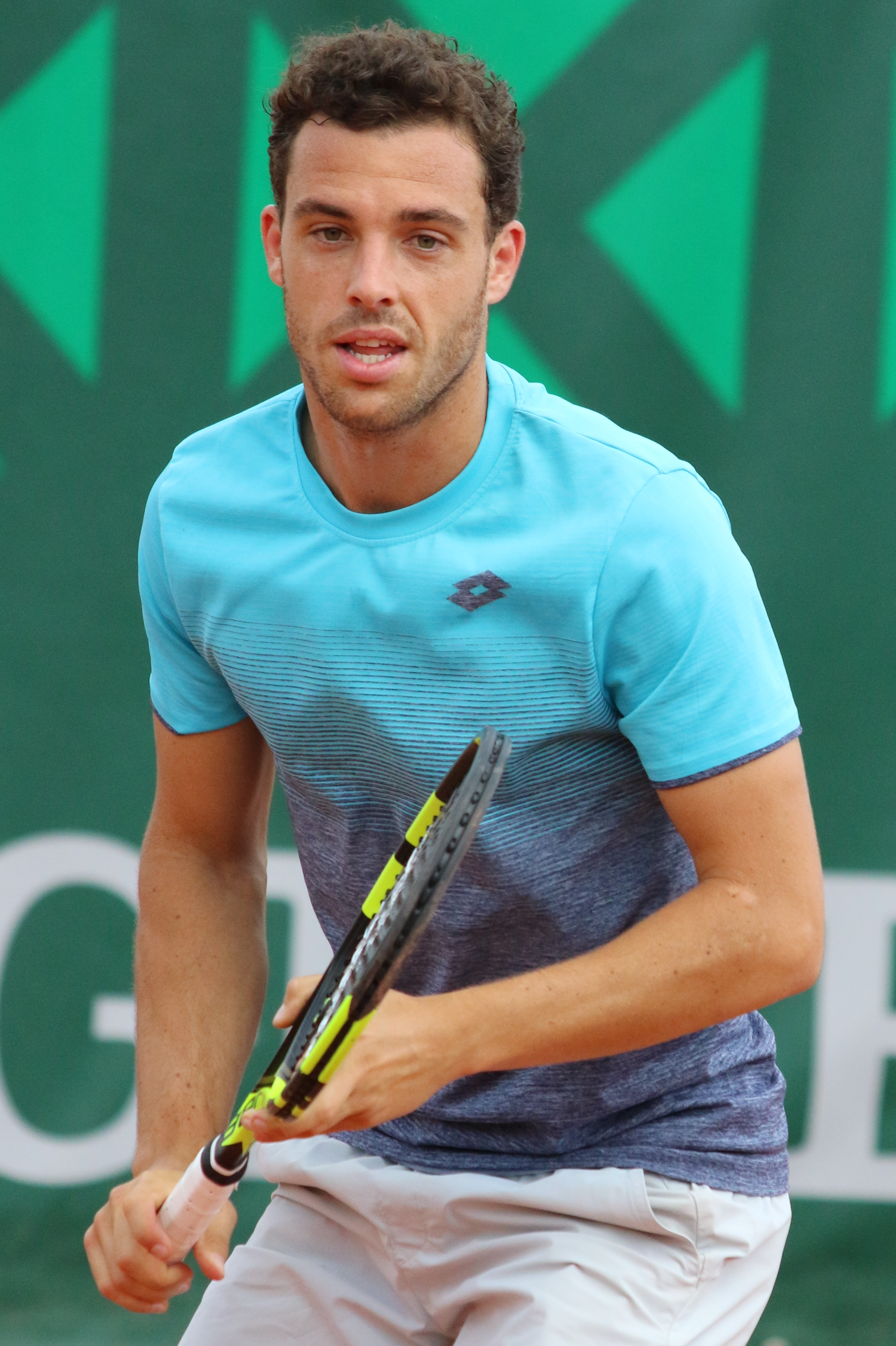
Cecchinato at the 2018 French Open

In March, he played and won a Challenger tournament in Santiago, defeating former top 5 player Tommy Robredo en route.

He won his first ATP title in Budapest after reaching the final as a lucky loser, having lost in the qualifying competition; he thus became the ninth player ever to win an ATP tournament as lucky loser.

At the 2018 French Open, the 72nd-ranked Cecchinato came from two sets down to win his first Grand Slam match against Marius Copil. In the second round, he defeated lucky loser Marco Trungelliti. In the third round, he came from a set down to topple 10th seed Pablo Carreño Busta. In the fourth round, he beat 8th seed Belgian David Goffin in four sets. He then upset former champion Novak Djokovic in four sets (with a 13–11 tiebreaker in the deciding set) to reach his first Grand Slam semifinal. His French Open run ended with a loss to Dominic Thiem. Cecchinato was the first unseeded men's singles semifinalist at the French Open since Gaël Monfils in 2008, the lowest-ranked man to reach the semifinals since Andrei Medvedev in 1999, and the first Italian man to reach a major singles semifinal since Corrado Barazzutti at the 1978 French Open. His semifinal finish moved him to 27th in the world and enabled him, for the first time in his career, to be seeded at a Grand Slam tournament at Wimbledon. Despite his first Grand Slam seeding, he lost in the first round in four sets against the young Australian Alex de Minaur.

Later in July, however, Cecchinato achieved his second career ATP title at the Croatia Open, defeating Guido Pella in the final. As a result, he attained a career-best ranking of 22nd in the world.

At the 2018 Shanghai Rolex Masters, the Italian defeated Gilles Simon and Chung Hyeon to reach the round of 16, where he fell to Novak Djokovic. As a result, he climbed to World No. 19 in the singles rankings on 15 October 2018.

=== 2019: Third ATP title and career high singles ranking ===
Cecchinato started his 2019 season in Doha where he reached the semifinals. That was his career best performance in a non-clay ATP tournament.

At the Australian Open, he lost to Filip Krajinović in the first round despite leading by two sets and having a match point in the fourth set. That was his third straight first round loss at a grand slam event.

During the Latin American clay court swing, Cecchinato won his third career ATP title at the Argentina Open, defeating Diego Schwartzman in the finals. Cecchinato didn't drop a set in the entire tournament, and lost just three games in a one-sided final. As a result, he also attained his career-best ranking of World No. 16 on 25 February 2019.

=== 2020–2021: Fourth and fifth ATP finals ===
In 2020 season, which was affected by COVID-19 pandemic, he managed to reach his fourth ATP final at the inaugural Forte Village Sardegna Open in October, where he lost in straight sets to Serbian Laslo Djere.

In May 2021, he reached his fifth final at the 2021 Emilia-Romagna Open, losing to first time ATP winner Sebastian Korda.

=== 2022: Out of top 200, Two Challenger titles, back to top 100 ===
In May, he qualified and defeated former world No. 3 Dominic Thiem at the 2022 Geneva Open in the first round.

In July, at the 2022 Croatia Open Umag he reached the quarterfinals defeating Lorenzo Musetti before losing to Franco Agamenone.

He re-entered the top 100 at No. 98 on 17 October 2022 following two Challenger titles in October.

=== 2023–2026: ATP semifinal, hiatus, back to ATP Tour ===
He reached his first ATP semifinal since 2021 at the 2023 Estoril Open. At the 2023 Mutua Madrid Open he reached the second round defeating Márton Fucsovics. At the Italian Open he reached the third round defeating Mackenzie McDonald and 21st seed Roberto Bautista Agut.

== Performance timelines ==
Key
W	F	SF	QF	#R	RR	Q#	P#	DNQ	A	Z#	PO	G	S	B	NMS	NTI	P	NH

(W) winner; (F) finalist; (SF) semifinalist; (QF) quarterfinalist; (#R) rounds 4, 3, 2, 1; (RR) round-robin stage; (Q#) qualification round; (P#) preliminary round; (DNQ) did not qualify; (A) absent; (Z#) Davis/Fed Cup Zonal Group (with number indication) or (PO) play-off; (G) gold, (S) silver or (B) bronze Olympic/Paralympic medal; (NMS) not a Masters tournament; (NTI) not a Tier I tournament; (P) postponed; (NH) not held; (SR) strike rate (events won / competed); (W–L) win–loss record.
To avoid confusion and double counting, these charts are updated at the conclusion of a tournament or when the player's participation has ended.

=== Singles ===
Tournament	2012	2013	2014	2015	2016	2017	2018	2019	2020	2021	2022	2023	2024	2025	2026	SR	W–L
Grand Slam tournaments
Australian Open	A	A	Q1	Q2	1R	Q1	Q1	1R	1R	1R	1R	Q1	Q1	A	Q1	0 / 5	0–5
French Open	A	A	Q2	Q3	1R	Q3	SF	1R	3R	3R	2R	1R	A	A	Q3	0 / 7	10–7
Wimbledon	A	A	A	A	A	1R	1R	1R	NH	1R	A	1R	A	A	Q1	0 / 5	0–5
US Open	A	A	Q2	1R	A	Q1	1R	1R	1R	1R	A	1R	A	A		0 / 6	0–6
Win–loss	0–0	0–0	0–0	0–1	0–2	0–1	5–3	0–4	2–3	2–4	1–2	0–3	0–0	0–0	0–0	0 / 23	10–23
ATP Masters 1000
Indian Wells Open	A	A	A	Q1	A	A	A	2R	NH	A	Q1	A	A	A	A	0 / 1	0–1
Miami Open	A	A	A	Q1	A	A	A	3R	NH	A	A	A	A	A	A	0 / 1	0–1
Monte-Carlo Masters	A	A	A	A	1R	A	2R	3R	NH	2R	Q1	A	A	A	A	0 / 4	4–4
Madrid Open	A	A	A	A	A	A	A	1R	NH	1R	A	2R	A	A	A	0 / 3	1–3
Italian Open	Q2	Q2	1R	Q1	1R	A	2R	2R	2R	Q2	A	3R	A	A	A	0 / 6	5–6
Canadian Open	A	A	A	A	A	A	1R	1R	NH	A	A	A	A	A		0 / 2	0–2
Cincinnati Open	A	A	A	Q1	A	A	1R	1R	A	A	A	A	A	A		0 / 2	0–2
Shanghai Masters	A	A	A	A	A	A	3R	1R	NH			A	A	A		0 / 2	2–2
Paris Masters	A	A	A	A	A	A	1R	A	1R	A	A	A	A	A		0 / 2	0–2
Win–loss	0–0	0–0	0–1	0–0	0–2	0–0	4–6	3–8	1–2	1–2	0–0	3–2	0–0	0–0	0–0	0 / 23	12–23
National representation
Davis Cup	A	A	A	A	QF	A	A	A	A	A	A	A	A	A		0 / 1	1–0
Career statistics
	2012	2013	2014	2015	2016	2017	2018	2019	2020	2021	2022	2023	2024	2025	2026	Career	
Tournaments	0	1	3	4	10	5	25	26	13	21	7	15	0	0		130	
Titles	0	0	0	0	0	0	2	1	0	0	0	0	0	0		3	
Finals	0	0	0	0	0	0	2	1	1	1	0	0	0	0		5	
Overall win–loss	0–0	0–1	0–3	0–4	3–10	1–5	23–23	12–25	8–13	16–21	4–7	11–15	0–0	0–0		78–127	
Year-end ranking	409	163	159	90	187	109	20	71	80	99	104	200	377	231		$5,084,948	

== ATP career finals ==
=== Singles: 5 (3 titles, 2 runner-ups) ===
Legend Grand Slam (0-0) ATP Masters 1000 (0-0) ATP 500 Series (0-0) ATP 250 Series (3–2)	Finals by surface Hard (0–0) Clay (3–2)	Finals by setting Outdoor (3–2) Indoor (0–0)

Result	W–L	Date	Tournament	Tier	Surface	Opponent	Score
Win	1–0	Apr 2018	Hungarian Open, Hungary	250 Series	Clay	(Australia) John Millman	7–5, 6–4
Win	2–0	Jul 2018	Croatia Open, Croatia	250 Series	Clay	(Argentina) Guido Pella	6–2, 7–6^{(7–4)}
Win	3–0	Feb 2019	Argentina Open, Argentina	250 Series	Clay	(Argentina) Diego Schwartzman	6–1, 6–2
Loss	3–1	Oct 2020	Forte Village Sardegna Open, Italy	250 Series	Clay	(Serbia) Laslo Đere	6–7^{(3–7)}, 5–7
Loss	3–2	May 2021	Emilia-Romagna Open, Italy	250 Series	Clay	(United States) Sebastian Korda	2–6, 4–6

== Records ==
- These records were attained in the Open Era of tennis.

Tournament	Year	Record accomplished	Player tied
Hungarian Open	2018	Winning an ATP tournament as lucky loser	Heinz Gunthardt; Bill Scanlon; Francisco Clavet; Christian Miniussi; Sergiy Stakhovsky; Rajeev Ram; Leonardo Mayer; Andrey Rublev; Kwon Soon-woo

== ATP Challenger and ITF Futures finals ==
=== Singles: 27 (14–13) ===
Legend ATP Challenger (8–12) ITF Futures (6–1)	Finals by surface Hard (0–1) Clay (14–12) Grass (0–0) Carpet (0–0)

Result	W–L	Date	Tournament	Tier	Surface	Opponent	Score
Win	1–0	Mar 2012	Croatia F3, Umag	Futures	Clay	(Slovakia) Andrej Martin	6–3, 6–4
Loss	1–1	Feb 2013	Croatia F1, Zagreb	Futures	Hard (i)	(Bosnia and Herzegovina) Damir Džumhur	2–6, 5–7
Win	2–1	Mar 2013	Croatia F3, Umag	Futures	Clay	(Hungary) Attila Balázs	6–4, 6–2
Win	3–1	Jul 2013	Italy F17, Modena	Futures	Clay	(Austria) Dominic Thiem	6–3, 6–4
Win	4–1	Aug 2013	San Marino, San Marino	Challenger	Clay	(Italy) Filippo Volandri	6–3, 6–4
Loss	4–2	Sep 2013	Sibiu, Romania	Challenger	Clay	(Czech Republic) Jaroslav Pospíšil	6–4, 4–6, 1–6
Win	5–2	Mar 2014	Italy F6, Santa Margherita di Pula	Futures	Clay	(Austria) Dennis Novak	6–4, 6–2
Win	6–2	Mar 2014	Italy F7, Santa Margherita di Pula	Futures	Clay	(Spain) Roberto Carballés Baena	6–4, 6–1
Loss	6–3	Jun 2014	Mestre, Italy	Challenger	Clay	(Uruguay) Pablo Cuevas	4–6, 6–2, 2–6
Win	7–3	Apr 2015	Turin, Italy	Challenger	Clay	(Belgium) Kimmer Coppejans	6–2, 6–3
Loss	7–4	Sep 2015	Genoa, Italy	Challenger	Clay	(Spain) Nicolás Almagro	7–6^{(7–1)}, 1–6, 4–6
Win	8–4	Jun 2016	Milan, Italy	Challenger	Clay	(Serbia) Laslo Đere	6–2, 6–2
Loss	8–5	Sep 2016	Como, Italy	Challenger	Clay	(France) Kenny de Schepper	6–2, 6–7^{(0–7)}, 5–7
Win	9–5	Mar 2017	Italy F5, Santa Margherita di Pula	Futures	Clay	(Italy) Andrea Basso	6–4, 6–1
Loss	9–6	May 2017	Ostrava, Czech Republic	Challenger	Clay	(Italy) Stefano Travaglia	2–6, 6–3, 4–6
Win	10–6	May 2017	Rome, Italy	Challenger	Clay	(Slovakia) Jozef Kovalík	6–4, 6–4
Loss	10–7	Jun 2017	Todi, Italy	Challenger	Clay	(Argentina) Federico Delbonis	5–7, 1–6
Loss	10–8	Sep 2017	Como, Italy	Challenger	Clay	(Portugal) Pedro Sousa	6–1, 2–6, 4–6
Win	11–8	Mar 2018	Santiago, Chile	Challenger	Clay	(Spain) Carlos Gómez-Herrera	1–6, 6–1, 6–1
Loss	11–9	Feb 2020	Punta del Este, Uruguay	Challenger	Clay	(Brazil) Thiago Monteiro	6–7^{(3–7)}, 7–6^{(8–6)}, 5–7
Loss	11–10	Oct 2021	Lošinj, Croatia	Challenger	Clay	(Spain) Carlos Taberner	w/o
Win	12–10	Oct 2022	Lisbon, Portugal	Challenger	Clay	(France) Luca Van Assche	6–3, 6–3
Win	13–10	Oct 2022	Rio de Janeiro, Brazil	Challenger	Clay	(Germany) Yannick Hanfmann	4–6, 6–4, 6–3
Win	14–10	Jun 2025	Milan, Italy	Challenger	Clay	(Croatia) Dino Prizmic	6-2, 6–3
Loss	14–11	Oct 2025	Lima, Peru	Challenger	Clay	(Argentina) Mariano Navone	4-6, 7–5, 4–6
Loss	14–12	Mar 2026	Kigali, Rwanda	Challenger	Clay	(Argentina) Marco Trungelliti	6-4, 0–6, 3–6
Loss	14–13	Jun 2026	Milan, Italy	Challenger	Clay	(Argentina) Facundo Díaz Acosta	7–6^{(7–0)}, 6–7^{(5–7)}, 6–7^{(5–7)}

=== Doubles: 9 (6–3) ===
Legend ATP Challenger (3–1) ITF Futures (3–2)	Finals by surface Hard (0–0) Clay (6–3) Grass (0–0) Carpet (0–0)

Result	W–L	Date	Tournament	Tier	Surface	Partner	Opponents	Score
Loss	0–1	Apr 2011	Italy F4, Rome	Futures	Clay	(Italy) Francesco Aldi	(Argentina) Leandro Migani (Sweden) Filip Prpic	3–6, 6–3, [6–10]
Win	1–1	Jul 2011	Italy F17, Sassuolo	Futures	Clay	(Italy) Francesco Aldi	(Italy) Filippo Leonardi (Italy) Jacopo Marchegiani	6–4, 6–3
Win	2–1	Aug 2011	Spain F27, Xativa	Futures	Clay	(Italy) Francesco Aldi	(Spain) Enrique Lopez-Perez (Spain) Ivan Arenas-Gualda	6–4, 6–3
Win	3–1	Aug 2011	Serbia F8, Novi Sad	Futures	Clay	(Italy) Matteo Civarolo	(Montenegro) Marko Begovic (France) Jeremy Tweedt	6–3, 6–1
Loss	3–2	Sep 2012	Todi, Italy	Challenger	Clay	(Italy) Alessio Di Mauro	(Austria) Martin Fischer (Austria) Philipp Oswald	3–6, 2–6
Loss	3–3	Jul 2013	Italy F17, Modena	Futures	Clay	(Italy) Matteo Fago	(Italy) Omar Giacalone (Italy) Daniele Giorgini	6–4, 6–7^{(5–7)}, [7–10]
Win	4–3	Sep 2014	Biella, Italy	Challenger	Clay	(Italy) Matteo Viola	(Germany) Frank Moser (Germany) Alexander Satschko	7–5, 6–0
Win	5–3	Apr 2017	Barletta, Italy	Challenger	Clay	(Italy) Matteo Donati	(Croatia) Marin Draganja (Croatia) Tomislav Draganja	6–3, 6–4
Win	6–3	Sep 2017	Sibiu, Romania	Challenger	Clay	(Italy) Matteo Donati	(Belgium) Sander Gille (Belgium) Joran Vliegen	6–3, 6–1

== Wins over top 10 players ==
- He has a 1–9 record against players who were, at the time the match was played, ranked in the top 10.

Season	2018	Total
Wins	1	1

#	Player	Rank	Event	Surface	Rd	Score	MCR
2018
1.	(Belgium) David Goffin	9	French Open, France	Clay	4R	7–5, 4–6, 6–0, 6–3	72

* As of 9 February 2021

== See also ==
- Italian players best ranking
- Best result of an Italian tennis player in Grand Slam
