= Hungarian Open (tennis) =

Men's tennis tournament (2017–2019)

Defunct tennis tournament
- Tour: ATP Tour
- Founded: 2017
- Abolished: 2019
- Location: Budapest, Hungary
- Venue: Nemzeti Edzés Központ (2017–2018); Sport11 Sport and Event Center (2019)
- Category: ATP Tour 250
- Surface: Clay court (Red) / outdoor
- Draw: 28S / 16D
- Prize money: €524,340 (2019)
- Website: hungarianopen.org

The Hungarian Open was a professional men's tennis tournament played on outdoor red clay courts. It was part of the ATP Tour 250 series of the Association of Tennis Professionals (ATP) Tour. It was held annually in April in Budapest, Hungary. It was the first ATP event hosted in Hungary and it was run by the Hungarian Tennis Association. The 2017 edition was the inaugural edition and the last edition was in 2019. Matteo Berrettini was the event's last singles champion. The tournament was replaced by the Serbia Open scheduled to return to the calendar in April 2021.

== Past finals ==
=== Singles ===
Year	Champion	Runner-up	Score
2017	(France) Lucas Pouille	(United Kingdom) Aljaž Bedene	6–3, 6–1
2018	(Italy) Marco Cecchinato	(Australia) John Millman	7–5, 6–4
2019	(Italy) Matteo Berrettini	(Serbia) Filip Krajinović	4–6, 6–3, 6–1
2020	Not held due to COVID-19 pandemic		

=== Doubles ===
Year	Champions	Runners-up	Score
2017	(United States) Brian Baker (Croatia) Nikola Mektić	(Colombia) Juan Sebastián Cabal (Colombia) Robert Farah	7–6^{(7–2)}, 6–4
2018	(United Kingdom) Dominic Inglot (Croatia) Franko Škugor	(Netherlands) Matwé Middelkoop (Argentina) Andrés Molteni	6–7^{(8–10)}, 6–1, [10–8]
2019	(United Kingdom) Ken Skupski (United Kingdom) Neal Skupski	(New Zealand) Marcus Daniell (Netherlands) Wesley Koolhof	6-3, 6-4
2020	Not held due to COVID-19 pandemic		
