= Attila Balázs =

Hungarian tennis player

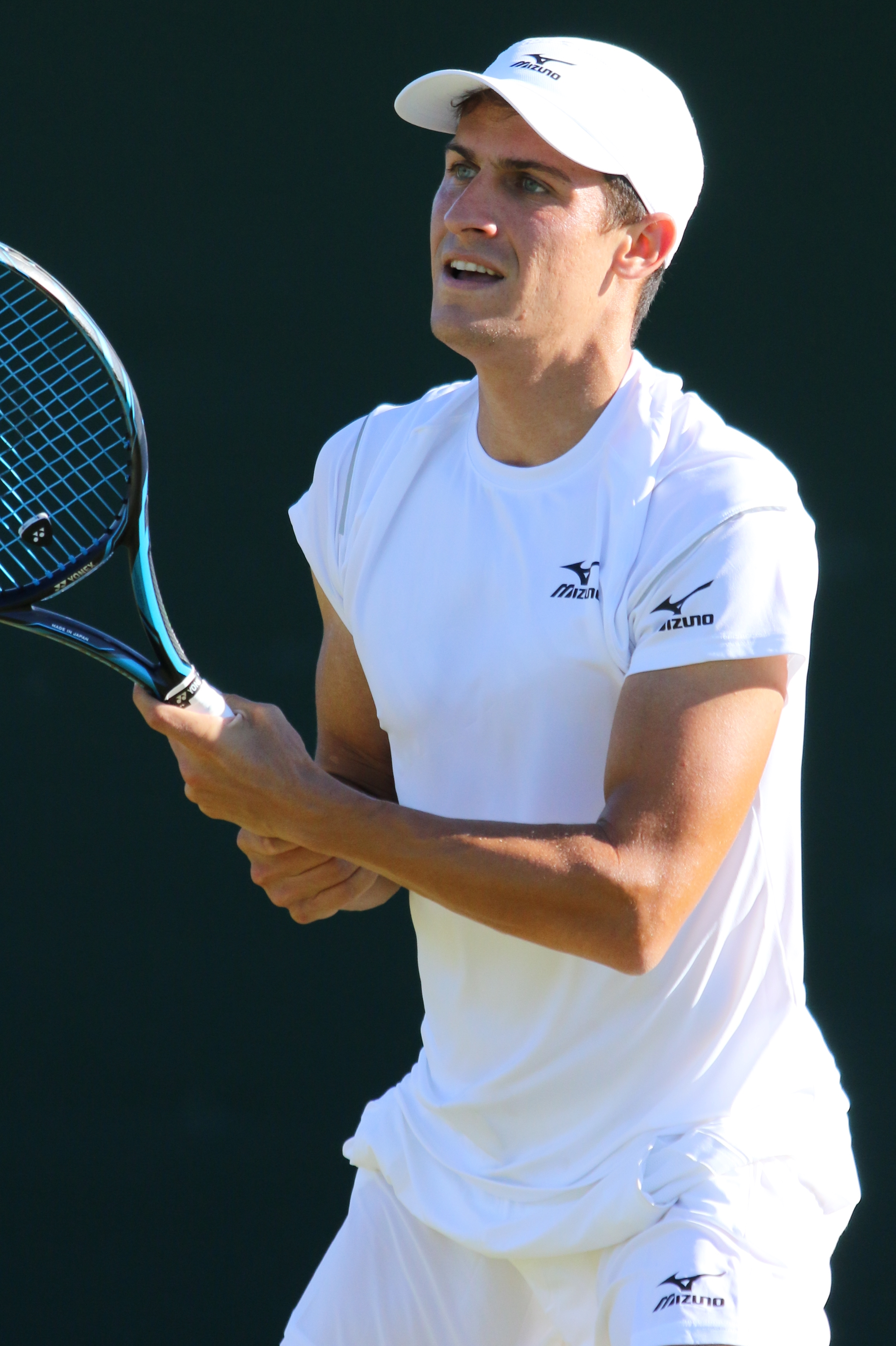
- Balázs at the 2018 Wimbledon Championships
- Country (sports): Hungary
- Residence: Budapest, Hungary
- Born: September 27, 1988 (age 38) Budapest, Hungary
- Height: 1.80 m (5 ft 11 in)
- Turned pro: 2006
- Retired: 2024
- Plays: Right-handed (two-handed backhand)
- Prize money: US$1,051,664

Singles
- Career record: 28–28
- Career titles: 0
- Highest ranking: No. 76 (2 March 2020)

Grand Slam singles results
- Australian Open: 1R (2021)
- French Open: 2R (2020)
- Wimbledon: 1R (2022)
- US Open: 1R (2020, 2023)

Doubles
- Career record: 9–6
- Career titles: 0
- Highest ranking: No. 173 (11 June 2018)

Team competitions
- Davis Cup: 19–13
- Last updated on: 6 November 2023.

Attila Balázs (Hungarian: [ˈɒtillɒ ˈbɒlaːʒ]; born September 27, 1988) is a Hungarian professional tennis player. He has a career-high singles ATP ranking of No. 76 achieved on 2 March 2020. He is a seven time Hungarian National Tennis Champion; after Béla von Kehrling, József Asbóth and István Gulyás. He is the fourth Hungarian player who was able to win at least 6 consecutive National Championships.

== Career ==
On his ATP debut, after qualifying for the main draw, Balázs reached the semifinals of the 2012 BRD Năstase Țiriac Trophy in Bucharest defeating four top 100 players. Despite his loss to Fabio Fognini, he reached the top 300 in the singles rankings at world No. 259 on 30 April 2012, rising close to 200 positions up.

His next best result was the quarterfinals seven years later as a wildcard at the 2019 Hungarian Open with victories over Hubert Hurkacz and sixth seed John Millman. Next he reached his first ATP final at the 2019 Croatia Open Umag where he lost against Dušan Lajović as a qualifier.

In 2020, he reached the semifinals of the ATP 500 2020 Rio Open tournament as a lucky loser where he was defeated by Gianluca Mager. As a result, he reached the top 100 after the tournament, and a career-high singles ranking of world No. 76 a week later, on 2 March 2020. He also recorded his first Major win at the 2020 Roland Garros.

At 2022 Wimbledon Championships, he used protected ranking to enter the main draw, making his debut at this Grand Slam.

At the 2023 US Open he also entered with protected ranking, replacing Denis Shapovalov after his withdrawal due to injury, but lost to former US Open champion Daniil Medvedev in straight sets in a little over an hour.

In February 2024, Balázs announced that he would retire from professional tennis.

In September 2026, the Hungarian returned to pro tennis, playing an ITF doubles event in his home country and winning the tournament partnering 2010-born Vincent Selmeczi.

== Personal life ==
His older brother, György Balázs, was also a tennis player, and the pair have played doubles together, winning five ITF doubles titles between 2007 and 2010.

== ATP career finals ==
=== Singles: 1 (1 runner up) ===
Legend Grand Slam tournaments (0–0) ATP World Tour Finals (0–0) ATP World Tour Masters 1000 (0–0) ATP World Tour 500 Series (0–0) ATP World Tour 250 Series (0–1)	Titles by surface Hard (0–0) Clay (0–1)	Titles by setting Outdoor (0–1) Indoor (0–0)

Result	W–L	Date	Tournament	Tier	Surface	Opponent	Score
Loss	0–1	Jul 2019	Croatia Open Umag, Croatia	250 Series	Clay	(Serbia) Dušan Lajović	5–7, 5–7

== Challenger and Futures finals ==
=== Singles: 47 (31–16) ===
Legend (singles) ATP Challenger Tour (2–2) ITF Futures Tour (29–14)	Titles by surface Hard (3–1) Clay (28–15)

Result	W–L	Date	Tournament	Tier	Surface	Opponent	Score
Loss	0–1	Nov 2007	Iran F3, Kish Island	Futures	Clay	(Italy) Enrico Burzi	2–6, 3–6
Loss	0–2	May 2008	Hungary F1, Mogyoród	Futures	Clay	(Hungary) György Balázs	3–6, 3–6
Loss	0–3	May 2008	Hungary F3, Budapest	Futures	Clay	(Italy) Matteo Viola	6–7^{(5–7)}, 3–6
Win	1–3	Jun 2008	Serbia F1, Belgrade	Futures	Clay	(Croatia) Nikola Mektić	6–7^{(1–7)}, 6–1, 6–2
Loss	1–4	Jun 2008	Serbia F2, Belgrade	Futures	Clay	(Serbia) Aleksander Slović	6–7^{(4–7)}, 6–0, 5–7
Loss	1–5	Aug 2008	Serbia F3, Novi Sad	Futures	Clay	(Serbia) Nikola Ćirić	6–7^{(4–7)}, 0–6
Win	2–5	Aug 2008	Serbia F5, Subotica	Futures	Clay	(Italy) Claudio Grassi	6–4, 6–3
Win	3–5	Jan 2009	Israel F1, Eilat	Futures	Hard	(Israel) Amir Hadad	6–1, 6–3
Win	4–5	Aug 2009	Romania F14, Arad	Futures	Clay	(Romania) Marius Copil	3–6, 7–5, 6–3
Loss	4–6	Aug 2009	Croatia F7, Čakovec	Futures	Clay	(Croatia) Nikola Mektić	3–6, 5–7
Loss	4–7	Oct 2009	Croatia F9, Dubrovnik	Futures	Clay	(Slovenia) Aljaž Bedene	2–6, 6–7^{(11–13)}
Loss	4–8	Oct 2009	Croatia F10, Dubrovnik	Futures	Clay	(Spain) Pedro Clar-Rosselló	3–6, 5–7
Win	5–8	Nov 2009	Iran F7, Kish Island	Futures	Clay	(Serbia) David Savić	6–0, 7–6^{(7–4)}
Win	6–8	Nov 2009	Iran F8, Kish Island	Futures	Clay	(Germany) Gero Kretschmer	6–2, 4–6, 6–3
Win	7–8	Jan 2010	Spain F2, Cala Millor	Futures	Clay	(Italy) Francesco Aldi	6–7^{(3–7)}, 6–4, 6–1
Loss	7–9	Mar 2010	Croatia F1, Poreč	Futures	Clay	(Czech Republic) Jaroslav Pospíšil	6–2, 3–6, 3–6
Win	8–9	Mar 2010	Croatia F2, Rovinj	Futures	Clay	(Italy) Matteo Viola	6–4, 6–4
Win	9–9	Jul 2010	Iran F1, Tehran	Futures	Clay	(Kuwait) Abdullah Maqdes	6–2, 6–2
Win	10–9	Jul 2010	Iran F2, Tehran	Futures	Clay	(Greece) Paris Gemouchidis	6–1, 6–4
Win	11–9	Oct 2010	Palermo, Italy	Challenger	Clay	(Austria) Martin Fischer	7–6^{(7–4)}, 2–6, 6–1
Win	12–9	Oct 2010	Croatia F7, Dubrovnik	Futures	Clay	(Germany) Marcel Zimmermann	6–2, 7–5
Win	13–9	Oct 2011	Hungary F3, Budapest	Futures	Clay	(France) Nicolas Devilder	7–6^{(7–4)}, 7–5
Win	14–9	Jun 2012	Serbia F2, Belgrade	Futures	Clay	(Serbia) Danilo Petrović	6–2, 6–2
Loss	14–10	Mar 2013	Croatia F3, Umag	Futures	Clay	(Italy) Marco Cecchinato	4–6, 2–6
Win	15–10	Jun 2013	Serbia F3, Šabac	Futures	Clay	(Bosnia and Herzegovina) Damir Džumhur	6–4, 6–2
Win	16–10	Jul 2013	Serbia F5, Belgrade	Futures	Clay	(Chile) Cristóbal Saavedra Corvalán	6–4, 6–0
Win	17–10	Sep 2016	Italy F27, Trieste	Futures	Clay	(Croatia) Kristijan Mesaroš	7–5, 6–4
Win	18–10	Sep 2016	Hungary F4, Budapest	Futures	Clay	(Chile) Jorge Montero	6–2, 6–2
Win	19–10	Sep 2016	Hungary F5, Székesfehérvár	Futures	Clay	(Slovakia) Patrik Fabian	6–1, 6–3
Win	20–10	Oct 2016	Hungary F8, Balatonboglár	Futures	Clay	(Russia) Alexey Vatutin	7–6^{(7–2)}, 6–3
Loss	20–11	Nov 2016	Italy F37, Latina	Futures	Clay	(Italy) Matteo Viola	6–0, 5–7, 2–6
Win	21–11	Dec 2016	Tunisia F34, Hammamet	Futures	Clay	(Austria) Gibril Diarra	6–3, 7–6^{(7–1)}
Win	22–11	Dec 2016	Tunisia F35, Hammamet	Futures	Clay	(Portugal) Gonçalo Oliveira	6–2, 6–3
Win	23–11	Dec 2016	Tunisia F36, Hammamet	Futures	Clay	(Italy) Raúl Brancaccio	6–4, 6–2
Win	24–11	Jan 2017	Tunisia F1, Hammamet	Futures	Clay	(Russia) Ivan Nedelko	6–3, 6–1
Win	25–11	May 2017	Hungary F1, Zalaegerszeg	Futures	Clay	(Austria) David Pichler	6–4, 6–4
Loss	25–12	May 2017	Hungary F2, Zamárdi	Futures	Clay	(Spain) Nicola Kuhn	4–6, 0–6
Win	26–12	Jun 2017	Spain F16, Huelva	Futures	Clay	(Spain) Ricardo Ojeda Lara	6–3, 1–6, 7–5
Win	27–12	Sep 2017	Kazakhstan F7, Shymkent	Futures	Clay	(Belgium) Kimmer Coppejans	6–1, 6–2
Loss	27–13	Feb 2018	Turkey F6, Antalya	Futures	Hard	(Bulgaria) Aleksandar Lazov	6–7^{(4–7)}, 3–6
Win	28–13	Feb 2018	Turkey F7, Antalya	Futures	Hard	(Bulgaria) Dimitar Kuzmanov	6–1, 6–3
Loss	28–14	Mar 2018	Italy F2, Santa Margherita di Pula	Futures	Clay	(Netherlands) Thiemo de Bakker	2–6, 7–5, 1–6
Win	29–14	Mar 2018	Italy F4, Santa Margherita di Pula	Futures	Clay	(Bosnia and Herzegovina) Tomislav Brkić	6–2, 7–5
Win	30–14	Apr 2018	Portugal F7, Porto	Futures	Clay	(Argentina) Pedro Cachin	6–0, 6–4
Loss	30–15	Jun 2019	Prostějov, Czech Republic	Challenger	Clay	(Spain) Pablo Andújar	2–6, 5–7
Loss	30–16	Jun 2019	Bratislava, Slovakia	Challenger	Clay	(Slovakia) Norbert Gombos	3–6, 6–3, 2–6
Win	31–16	Jan 2020	Bangkok, Thailand	Challenger	Hard	(Russia) Aslan Karatsev	7–6^{(7–5)}, 0–6, 7–6^{(8–6)}

=== Doubles: 20 (16–4) ===
Legend (doubles) ATP Challenger Tour (3–1) ITF Futures Tour (13–3)	Titles by surface Hard (1–0) Clay (15–4)

Result	W–L	Date	Tournament	Tier	Surface	Partner	Opponents	Score
Win	1–0	Nov 2006	Brazil F18, São Paulo	Futures	Clay	(Hungary) Kornél Bardóczky	(Italy) Marco Gualdi (Italy) Mattia Livraghi	4–6, 6–3, 7–6^{(10–8)}
Loss	1–1	Nov 2007	Iran F3, Kish Island	Futures	Clay	(Hungary) György Balázs	(Kazakhstan) Alexey Kedryuk (Russia) Valery Rudnev	6–7^{(3–7)}, 5–7
Win	2–1	Nov 2007	Iran F4, Kish Island	Futures	Clay	(Hungary) György Balázs	(Slovakia) Andrej Martin (Slovakia) Marek Semjan	6–3, 7–6^{(8–6)}
Win	3–1	May 2008	Turkey F6, Antalya	Futures	Clay	(Hungary) György Balázs	(Italy) Riccardo Ghedin (Estonia) Mait Künnap	4–6, 6–2, [10–7]
Win	4–1	May 2008	Hungary F1, Mogyoród	Futures	Clay	(Hungary) György Balázs	(Hungary) Olivér Borsos (Hungary) Márk Kovács	6–0, 6–3
Loss	4–2	May 2008	Hungary F2, Gödöllő	Futures	Clay	(Hungary) György Balázs	(Israel) Amir Hadad (Belgium) Stefan Wauters	6–7^{(4–7)}, 2–6
Win	5–2	Sep 2008	Banja Luka, Bosnia and Herzegovina	Challenger	Clay	(Israel) Amir Hadad	(Australia) Rameez Junaid (Germany) Philipp Marx	7–5, 6–2
Win	6–2	Oct 2008	Croatia F10, Dubrovnik	Futures	Clay	(Israel) Amir Hadad	(Croatia) Mislav Hižak (Croatia) Joško Topić	6–4, 6–2
Win	7–2	Oct 2008	Croatia F11, Dubrovnik	Futures	Clay	(Israel) Amir Hadad	(Greece) Alexandros Jakupovic (Austria) Max Raditschnigg	6–3, 6–1
Win	8–2	Jan 2009	Israel F1, Eilat	Futures	Hard	(Israel) Amir Hadad	(Bosnia and Herzegovina) Ismar Gorčić (Croatia) Petar Jelenić	6–1, 6–0
Win	9–2	Jul 2009	Romania F11, Oradea	Futures	Clay	(Hungary) György Balázs	(Romania) Marius Copil (Romania) Ilie-Aurelian Giurgiu	6–2, 6–2
Loss	9–3	Mar 2010	Croatia F1, Poreč	Futures	Clay	(Bosnia and Herzegovina) Ismar Gorčić	(Spain) Carlos Poch Gradin (Italy) Matteo Viola	6–7^{(3–7)}, 4–6
Win	10–3	Jul 2010	Iran F2, Tehran	Futures	Clay	(Hungary) György Balázs	(Chinese Taipei) Huang Liang-chi (India) Rupesh Roy	6–1, 6–3
Win	11–3	Mar 2012	Croatia F4, Poreč	Futures	Clay	(Hungary) Kornél Bardóczky	(Germany) Steven Moneke (Germany) Marc Sieber	2–6, 6–1, [10–8]
Win	12–3	Sep 2016	Hungary F6, Dunakeszi	Futures	Clay	(Hungary) Gergely Kisgyörgy	(Hungary) Levente Gödry (Hungary) Péter Nagy	6–1, 6–3
Win	13–3	Nov 2016	Tunisia F33, Hammamet	Futures	Clay	(Portugal) Gonçalo Oliveira	(Spain) Sergio Martos Gornés (Spain) Pol Toledo Bagué	6–4, 6–3
Win	14–3	May 2017	Hungary F1, Zalaegerszeg	Futures	Clay	(Hungary) Gábor Borsos	(Austria) Pascal Brunner (Austria) David Pichler	6–4, 6–2
Win	15–3	Aug 2017	Biella, Italy	Challenger	Clay	(Brazil) Fabiano de Paula	(Sweden) Johan Brunström (Croatia) Dino Marcan	5–7, 6–4, [10–4]
Win	16–3	May 2018	Ostrava, Czech Republic	Challenger	Clay	(Portugal) Gonçalo Oliveira	(Czech Republic) Lukáš Rosol (Ukraine) Sergiy Stakhovsky	6–0, 7–5
Loss	16–4	Jun 2018	Poznań, Poland	Challenger	Clay	(Italy) Andrea Vavassori	(Poland) Mateusz Kowalczyk (Poland) Szymon Walków	5–7, 7–6^{(10–8)}, [8–10]

== Davis Cup ==
=== Participations: (19–13) ===
Group membership World Group (1–1) Qualifying Round (1–2) WG Play-off (1–1) Group I (3–2) Group II (13–7) Group III (0–0) Group IV (0–0)	Matches by surface Hard (6–5) Clay (11–4) Grass (0–0) Carpet (2–4)	Matches by type Singles (12–10) Doubles (7–3)

- ▲ ▼ indicates the outcome of the Davis Cup match followed by the score, date, place of event, the zonal classification and its phase, and the court surface.

Rubber outcome	No.	Rubber	Match type (partner if any)	Opponent nation	Opponent player(s)	Score
▼2–3; 6–8 March 2009; Egyetemi Sportcsarnok, Győr, Hungary; Europe/Africa first round; carpet(i) surface
Defeat	1	I	Singles	Bulgaria	Todor Enev	2–6, 6–4, 4–6, 4–6
Defeat	2	IV	Singles	Bulgaria	Grigor Dimitrov	6–7^{(2–7)}, 6–3, 3–6, 6–3, 0–6
▲3–2; 10–12 July 2009; Gödöllő Kiskastély, Gödöllő, Hungary; Europe/Africa relegation play-off; clay surface
Victory	3	I	Singles	Moldova	Radu Albot	6–1, 6–4, 4–6, 6–4
Victory	4	III	Doubles (with Róbert Varga)	Moldova	Radu Albot / Andrei Ciumac	6–3, 4–6, 4–6, 7–5, 6–4
Victory	5	IV	Singles	Moldova	Andrei Gorban	6–4, 6–0, 6–4
▲4–1; 9–11 July 2010; Gödöllő Kiskastély, Gödöllő, Hungary; Europe/Africa relegation play-off; clay surface
Victory	6	I	Singles	(North Macedonia) Macedonia	Predrag Rusevski	6–4, 6–2, 6–4
Victory	7	IV	Singles	(North Macedonia) Macedonia	Dimitar Grabul	6–3, 6–1, 6–2
▲5–0; 4–6 March 2011; National Tennis Centre, Nicosia, Cyprus; Europe/Africa first round; hard surface
Victory	8	II	Singles	Cyprus	Philippos Tsangaridis	6–1, 6–2, 6–2
Victory	9	III	Doubles (with Kornél Bardóczky)	Cyprus	Rareș Cuzdriorean / Christopher Koutrouzas	6–1, 6–4, 6–3
Victory	10	IV	Singles	Cyprus	Sergis Kyratzis	6–4, 7–6^{(8–6)}
▲3–2; 8–10 July 2011; Gödöllő Kiskastély, Gödöllő, Hungary; Europe/Africa second round; clay surface
Victory	11	II	Singles	Belarus	Sergey Betov	6–2, 6–1, 7–5
Victory	12	IV	Singles	Belarus	Uladzimir Ignatik	7–6^{(7–5)}, 6–3, 7–6^{(9–7)}
▼0–5; 16–18 September 2011; Braehead Arena, Glasgow, Great Britain; Europe/Africa third round; hard (i) surface
Defeat	13	I	Singles	(United Kingdom) Great Britain	James Ward	4–6, 4–6, 6–4, 4–6
Defeat	14	III	Doubles (with Kornél Bardóczky)	(United Kingdom) Great Britain	Colin Fleming / Ross Hutchins	3–6, 4–6, 4–6
▲3–2; 10–12 February 2012; Városi Sportcsarnok, Szeged, Hungary; Europe/Africa first round; carpet(i) surface
Victory	15	III	Doubles (with Ádám Kellner)	(Republic of Ireland) Ireland	Sam Barry / James McGee	7–6^{(8–6)}, 6–7^{(2–7)}, 6–2, 7–6^{(10–8)}
Victory	16	IV	Singles	(Republic of Ireland) Ireland	Conor Niland	6–1, 6–2, 6–1
▼2–3; 6–8 April 2012; Bujtosi Szabadidő Csarnok, Nyíregyháza, Hungary; Europe/Africa second round; carpet (i) surface
Defeat	17	III	Doubles (with Kornél Bardóczky)	Latvia	Ernests Gulbis / Andis Juška	7–6^{(7–5)}, 3–6, 4–6, 2–6
Defeat	18	IV	Singles	Latvia	Ernests Gulbis	4–6, 3–6, 3–6
▼1–4; 5–7 April 2013; Budapesti Elektromos SE Csarnok, Budapest, Hungary; Europe/Africa relegation play-off; hard (i) surface
Victory	19	I	Singles	Luxembourg	Ugo Nastasi	6–4, 7–6^{(7–3)}, 6–1
Defeat	20	IV	Singles	Luxembourg	Gilles Müller	7–6^{(7–1)}, 2–6, 3–6, 6–4, 7–9
▲3–1; 3–5 February 2017; Aegon Arena, Bratislava, Slovakia; Europe/Africa second round; hard (i) surface
Defeat	21	I	Singles	Slovakia	Martin Kližan	1–6, 2–6, 6–3, 4–6
Victory	22	III	Doubles (with Márton Fucsovics)	Slovakia	Martin Kližan / Andrej Martin	6–3, 2–6, 6–3, 6–7^{(5–7)}, 6–1
▲3–1; 15–17 September 2017; Kopaszi gát, Budapest, Hungary; World Group play-off; clay surface
Defeat	23	II	Singles	Russia	Karen Khachanov	6–3, 2–6, 6–7^{(12–14)}, 1–6
Victory	24	III	Doubles (with Márton Fucsovics)	Russia	Konstantin Kravchuk / Daniil Medvedev	7–6^{(7–4)}, 6–4, 7–6^{(7–4)}
▼2–3; 2–4 February 2018; Country Hall Liège, Liège, Belgium; World Group first round; hard (indoor) surface
Defeat	25	II	Singles	Belgium	David Goffin	4–6, 4–6, 0–6
Victory	26	III	Doubles (with Márton Fucsovics)	Belgium	Ruben Bemelmans / Joris De Loore	6–3, 6–4, 6–7^{(2–7)}, 4–6, 7–5
▲3–2; 14–16 September 2019; Sport11 Sports, Leisure and Event Center, Budapest, Hungary; Europe/Africa Zone Group I first round; clay surface
Defeat	27	I	Singles	Ukraine	Sergiy Stakhovsky	4–6, 3–6
Victory	28	III	Doubles (with Márton Fucsovics)	Ukraine	Denys Molchanov / Sergiy Stakhovsky	7–6^{(7–1)}, 3–6, 6–3
Victory	29	V	Singles	Ukraine	Illya Marchenko	6–4, 7–5
▲3–2; 6-7 March 2020; Főnix Hall, Debrecen, Hungary; Davis Cup qualifying round; clay (indoor) surface
Defeat	30	I	Singles	Belgium	Ruben Bemelmans	7–5, 6–7^{(4–7)}, 4–6
Defeat	31	III	Doubles (with Márton Fucsovics)	Belgium	Sander Gillé / Joran Vliegen	6–3, 1–6, 4–6
Victory	32	IV	Singles	Belgium	Kimmer Coppejans	6–3, 6–0

== Record against other players ==
Balazs's match record against players who have been ranked in the top 50, with those who are active in boldface.
ATP Tour, Challenger and Future tournaments' main draw and qualifying matches are considered.

Opponent	Highest ranking	Matches	Won	Lost	Win %	Last match
(Bulgaria) **Grigor Dimitrov**	3	1	0	1	0%	Lost (6-7^{(2-7)}, 6–3, 3–6, 6–3, 0–6) at 2009 Davis Cup 1R
(Belgium) **David Goffin**	7	2	0	2	0%	Lost (4–6, 4–6, 0–6) at 2018 Davis Cup 1R
(Russia) **Andrey Rublev**	5	1	1	0	100%	Won (6–3, 7–5) at 2017 Umag Q2
(Italy) **Matteo Berrettini**	8	1	0	1	0%	Lost (4–6, 6–3, 6–7^{(4–7)}) at 2018 Budapest 1R
(Russia) **Karen Khachanov**	8	1	0	1	0%	Lost (6–3, 2–6, 6– 7^{(12–14)}, 1–6) at 2017 Davis Cup WG PO
(Spain) **Roberto Bautista Agut**	9	1	0	1	0%	Lost (3–6, 1–6, 2–6) at **2020 French Open 2R**
(Italy) **Fabio Fognini**	9	1	0	1	0%	Lost (3–6, 1–6) at 2012 Bucharest SF
(Spain) **Pablo Carreño Busta**	10	1	0	1	0%	Lost (1–6, 6–7^{(5–7)}) at 2010 Meknes Q1
(Latvia) **Ernests Gulbis**	10	1	0	1	0%	Lost (4–6, 3–6, 3–6) at 2012 Davis Cup 2R
(Serbia) **Viktor Troicki**	12	1	1	0	100%	Won (1–6, 7–6^{(7–4)}, 6–3) at 2019 Heilbronn Q1
(United Kingdom) **Kyle Edmund**	14	1	1	0	100%	Won (6–4, 3–6, 6–2) at 2013 Croatia F3 QF
(Italy) **Marco Cecchinato**	16	2	0	2	0%	Lost (7–6^{(7–5)}, 4–6, 4–6) at 2017 Ostrava SF
(Poland) **Hubert Hurkacz**	16	3	1	2	33%	Lost (3–6, 5–7) at 2020 Vienna 1R
(Germany) **Philipp Kohlschreiber**	16	1	0	1	0%	Lost (4–6, 1–6) at 2012 Kitzbühel 2R
(Spain) **Albert Ramos Viñolas**	17	2	0	2	0%	Lost (1–6, 3–6) at 2019 Genoa 3R
(Italy) **Jannik Sinner**	09	1	0	1	0%	Lost (4–6, 6–7^{(6–8)}) at 2019 Ostrava 1R
(Chile) **Cristian Garín**	17	1	0	1	0%	Lost (3–6, 0–6) at 2020 Córdoba 2R
(Uruguay) **Pablo Cuevas**	19	2	2	0	100%	Won (6–4, 6–3) at 2020 Rio de Janeiro 1R
(Spain) **Marcel Granollers**	19	1	0	1	0%	Lost (6–7^{(5–7)}, 3–6, 3–6) at 2019 Wimbledon Q3
(Belgium) Xavier Malisse	19	1	1	0	100%	Won (4–6, 6–3, 6–4) at 2012 Bucharest QF
(Austria) Stefan Koubek	20	1	0	1	0%	Lost (2–6, 1–6) at 2011 Zagreb Q3
(Brazil) **Thomaz Bellucci**	21	1	0	1	0%	Lost (2–6, 2–6) at 2019 Tunis QF
(Luxembourg) Gilles Müller	21	1	0	1	0%	Lost (7–6^{(7–1)}, 2–6, 3–6, 6–4, 7–9) at 2013 Davis Cup R PO
(Bosnia and Herzegovina) **Damir Džumhur**	23	2	2	0	100%	Won (6–3, 0–6, 7–5) at 2017 Umag 1R
(Serbia) **Dušan Lajović**	23	4	2	2	50%	Lost (5–7, 5–7) at 2019 Umag F
(Russia) **Aslan Karatsev**	24	1	1	0	100%	Won (7–6^{(7–5)}, 0–6, 7–6^{(8–6)}) at 2020 Bangkok F
(Slovakia) **Martin Kližan**	24	3	1	2	33%	Lost (1–6, 2–6, 6–3, 4–6) at 2017 Davis Cup 2R
(Serbia) **Filip Krajinović**	26	4	2	2	50%	Won (6–3, 6–7^{(1–7)}, 7–6^{(7–5)}) at 2019 Umag 2R
(Czech Republic) **Lukáš Rosol**	26	3	1	2	33%	Lost (2–6, 1–6) at 2018 Prague 1R
(Italy) **Lorenzo Sonego**	21	2	1	1	50%	Won (6–2, 7–6^{(7–3)}) at 2020 Córdoba 1R
(Serbia) **Laslo Djere**	27	2	2	0	100%	Won (6–2, 6–4) at 2019 Umag SF
(Italy) Potito Starace	27	1	1	0	100%	Won (6–3, 6–4) at 2012 Bucharest 2R
(Colombia) **Santiago Giraldo**	28	1	1	0	100%	Won (6–3, 6–3) at 2017 Lisbon 1R
(Hungary) **Márton Fucsovics**	31	2	0	2	0%	Lost (5–7, 0–6) at 2018 Budapest 1R
(Ukraine) **Sergiy Stakhovsky**	31	2	0	2	0%	Lost (4–6, 4–6) at 2019 Bratislava 1R
(Spain) **Pablo Andújar**	32	1	0	1	0%	Lost (2–6, 5–7) at 2019 Prostějov F
(Netherlands) **Robin Haase**	33	1	0	1	0%	Lost (4–6, 1–2 ret.) at 2020 Bangkok 3R
(Australia) **John Millman**	33	2	2	0	100%	Won (6–4, 2–6, 6–2) at 2019 Budapest 2R
(France) **Édouard Roger-Vasselin**	35	1	0	1	0%	Lost (6–3, 2–6, 2–6) at 2011 Orbetello 1R
(Italy) **Simone Bolelli**	36	1	1	0	100%	Won (6–7^{(4–7)}, 6–3, 6–4) at 2017 Ostrava QF
(France) **Pierre-Hugues Herbert**	36	1	0	1	0%	Lost (3–6, 4–6) at 2019 Budapest QF
(Japan) **Yūichi Sugita**	36	1	0	1	0%	Lost (3–6, 6–7^{(1–7)}) at 2008 Thailand F2 1R
(Serbia) **Miomir Kecmanović**	38	1	0	1	0%	Lost (2–6, 6–3, 3–6) at 2018 Roland Garros Q1
(Moldova) **Radu Albot**	39	1	1	0	100%	Won (6–1, 6–4, 4–6, 6–4) at 2009 Davis Cup R PO
(Germany) **Peter Gojowczyk**	39	1	0	1	0%	Lost (3–6, 6–3, 4–6) at 2011 Germany F7 QF
(Kazakhstan) **Mikhail Kukushkin**	39	1	0	1	0%	Lost (4–6, 5–7, 4–6) at **2020 US Open 1R**
(Netherlands) **Thiemo de Bakker**	40	2	0	2	0%	Lost (2–6, 7–5, 1–6) at 2018 Italy F2 F
(Slovenia) **Aljaž Bedene**	43	3	0	3	0%	Lost (1–6, 2–6) at 2011 Croatia F12 SF
(Slovenia) Grega Žemlja	43	2	0	2	0%	Lost (2–6, 2–6) at 2010 Rijeka QF
(Slovakia) **Lukáš Lacko**	44	1	1	0	100%	Won (6–7^{(7–9)}, 7–6^{(7–2)}, 6–4) at 2012 Bucharest 1R
(Spain) **Daniel Gimeno Traver**	48	1	0	1	0%	Lost (7–6^{(8–6)}, 5–7, 2–6) at 2008 Banja Luka Challenger SF
(Japan) **Yoshihito Nishioka**	48	1	0	1	0%	Lost (3–6, 2–6) at 2019 Basel Q1
(Ukraine) **Illya Marchenko**	49	2	2	0	100%	Won (6–4, 7–5) at 2019 Davis Cup R1
(United States) **Sebastian Korda**	50	1	0	1	0%	Lost (4–6, 6–4, 3–6) at 2020 New York Q1
Total		81	28	53	35%	* Statistics correct as of 21 June 2021

== Grand Slam performance timeline ==
Key
W	F	SF	QF	#R	RR	Q#	P#	DNQ	A	Z#	PO	G	S	B	NMS	NTI	P	NH

(W) winner; (F) finalist; (SF) semifinalist; (QF) quarterfinalist; (#R) rounds 4, 3, 2, 1; (RR) round-robin stage; (Q#) qualification round; (P#) preliminary round; (DNQ) did not qualify; (A) absent; (Z#) Davis/Fed Cup Zonal Group (with number indication) or (PO) play-off; (G) gold, (S) silver or (B) bronze Olympic/Paralympic medal; (NMS) not a Masters tournament; (NTI) not a Tier I tournament; (P) postponed; (NH) not held; (SR) strike rate (events won / competed); (W–L) win–loss record.
To avoid confusion and double counting, these charts are updated at the conclusion of a tournament or when the player's participation has ended.

Tournament	2010	2011	2012	2013–16	2017	2018	2019	2020	2021	2022	2023	SR	W–L	Win %
Australian Open	A	A	A	A	A	A	A	A	1R	A	A	0 / 1	0–1	0%
French Open	Q1	Q1	A	A	A	Q1	Q2	2R	A	1R	A	0 / 2	1–2	33%
Wimbledon	A	A	A	A	Q1	Q2	Q3	NH	A	1R	A	0 / 1	0–1	0%
US Open	Q1	A	A	A	A	A	A	1R	A	A	1R	0 / 2	0–2	0%
Win–loss	0–0	0–0	0–0	0–0	0–0	0–0	0–0	1–2	0–1	0–2	0–1	0 / 6	1–6	14%
