= 2011 ATP Challenger Tour Finals – Singles =

Singles
- 2011 ATP Challenger Tour Finals

Final
- Champion: (Germany) Cedrik-Marcel Stebe
- Runner-up: (Israel) Dudi Sela
- Score: 6–2, 6–4

Events
Singles	Doubles
← 2010 ·	ATP Challenger Tour Finals	· 2012 →

Cedrik-Marcel Stebe won the first edition of the tournament after defeating Dudi Sela 6–2, 6–4 in the final.

== Seeds ==
1. (Brazil) Thomaz Bellucci (semifinals)
2. (Portugal) Rui Machado (round robin)
3. (Slovakia) Martin Kližan (round robin)
4. (Israel) Dudi Sela (final)
5. (Germany) Cedrik-Marcel Stebe (champion)
6. (Germany) Andreas Beck (semifinals)
7. (Germany) Matthias Bachinger (round robin)
8. (United States) Bobby Reynolds (round robin)

== Draw ==
=== Key ===
- Q = Qualifier
- WC = Wild card
- LL = Lucky loser
- Alt = Alternate
- SE = Special exempt
- PR = Protected ranking
- ITF = ITF entry
- JE = Junior exempt
- w/o = Walkover
- r = Retired
- d = Defaulted
- SR = Special ranking

=== Finals ===
Semifinals
6	(Germany) Andreas Beck	7	6^{3}	6^{4}
5	(Germany) Cedrik-Marcel Stebe	5	7^{7}	7^{7}
4	(Israel) Dudi Sela	6	6
1/WC	(Brazil) Thomaz Bellucci	4	4

Final
5	(Germany) Cedrik-Marcel Stebe	6	6
4	(Israel) Dudi Sela	2	4

=== Green group ===
		(Brazil) Bellucci	(Slovakia) Kližan	(Germany) Beck	(United States) Reynolds	RR W–L	Set W–L	Game W–L	Standings
1/WC	(Brazil) Thomaz Bellucci		3–6, 6–4, 7–6^{(9–7)}	4–6, 6–4, 4–6	6–3, 6–3	2–1	5–3	42–38	2
3	(Slovakia) Martin Kližan	6–3, 4–6, 6–7^{(7–9)}		3–6, 1–6	2–6, 6–3, 1–6	0–3	2–6	29–43	4
6	(Germany) Andreas Beck	6–4, 4–6, 6–4	6–3, 6–1		6–3, 7–5	3–0	6–1	41–26	1
8	(United States) Bobby Reynolds	3–6, 3–6	6–2, 3–6, 6–1	3–6, 5–7		1–2	2–5	29–34	3

Standings are determined by: 1. number of wins; 2. number of matches; 3. in two-players-ties, head-to-head records; 4. in three-players-ties, percentage of sets won, or of games won; 5. steering-committee decision.

=== Yellow group ===
		(Portugal) Machado	(Israel) Sela	(Germany) Stebe	(Germany) Bachinger	RR W–L	Set W–L	Game W–L	Standings
2	(Portugal) Rui Machado		6–2, 6–2	5–7, 0–6	3–6, 7–6^{(7–4)}, 6–4	2–1	4–3	33–33	3
4	(Israel) Dudi Sela	2–6, 2–6		6–4, 7–6^{(7–3)}	6–2, 6–2	2–1	4–2	29–26	1
5	(Germany) Cedrik-Marcel Stebe	7–5, 6–0	4–6, 6–7^{(3–7)}		6–4, 2–6, 6–4	2–1	4–3	37–32	2
7	(Germany) Matthias Bachinger	6–3, 6–7^{(4–7)}, 4–6	2–6, 2–6	4–6, 6–2, 4–6		0–3	2–6	34–42	4

Standings are determined by: 1. number of wins; 2. number of matches; 3. in two-players-ties, head-to-head records; 4. in three-players-ties, percentage of sets won, or of games won; 5. steering-committee decision.
