= 2013 ATP Challenger Tour Finals – Singles =

Singles
- 2013 ATP Challenger Tour Finals

Final
- Champion: (Italy) Filippo Volandri
- Runner-up: (Colombia) Alejandro González
- Score: 4–6, 6–4, 6–2

Events
Singles	Doubles
← 2012 ·	ATP Challenger Tour Finals	· 2014 →

Guido Pella was the champion in 2013, but did not qualify for the event in 2013, since he played mostly ATP World Tour tournaments in that season.
Filippo Volandri has won the tournament by defeating Alejandro González 4–6, 6–4, 6–2 in the final. For the third consecutive year since the tournament's inception, the finalists played a rematch of their previous round-robin stage encounter, in which the champion was defeated by the runner-up.

== Seeds ==
1. (Russia) Teymuraz Gabashvili (semifinals)
2. (Italy) Filippo Volandri (champion)
3. (Ukraine) Aleksandr Nedovyesov (semifinals)
4. (Netherlands) Jesse Huta Galung (round robin)
5. (Colombia) Alejandro González (final)
6. (Romania) Adrian Ungur (round robin)
7. (Slovakia) Andrej Martin (round robin)
8. (Brazil) Guilherme Clezar (round robin)

== Draw ==
Key

- Q = Qualifier
- WC = Wild card
- LL = Lucky loser
- Alt = Alternate
- ITF = ITF entry
- PR = Protected ranking
- SR = Special ranking
- SE = Special exempt
- JE = Junior exempt
- JR = Junior Accelerator Programme entrant
- CO = College Accelerator Programme entrant
- NG = Next Gen Accelerator Program entrant
- w/o = Walkover
- r = Retired
- d = Defaulted

=== Finals ===
Semifinals
1	(Russia) Teymuraz Gabashvili	5	6	4
2	(Italy) Filippo Volandri	7	2	6
5	(Colombia) Alejandro González	6	6^{4}	6
3	(Ukraine) Aleksandr Nedovyesov	3	7^{7}	0

Final
2	(Italy) Filippo Volandri	4	6	6
5	(Colombia) Alejandro González	6	4	2

=== Green group ===
		(Russia) Gabashvili	(Ukraine) Nedovyesov	(Romania) Ungur	(Brazil) Clezar	RR W–L	Set W–L	Game W–L	Standings
1	(Russia) Teymuraz Gabashvili		4–6, 6–3, 6–1	6–2, 6–3	7–5, 4–6, 4–6	2–1	5–3 (62.5%)	43–32 (57.3%)	1
3	(Ukraine) Aleksandr Nedovyesov	6–4, 3–6, 1–6		6–4, 5–7, 6–3	6–4, 5–7, 6–3	2–1	5–4 (55.6%)	44–44 (50.0%)	2
6	(Romania) Adrian Ungur	3–6, 2–6	4–6, 7–5, 3–6		6–3, 7–5	1–2	3–4 (42.9%)	32–37 (46.4%)	3
8/WC	(Brazil) Guilherme Clezar	5–7, 6–4, 6–4	4–6, 7–5, 3–6	3–6, 5–7		1–2	3–5 (37.5%)	39–45 (46.4%)	4

Standings are determined by: 1. number of wins; 2. number of matches; 3. in two-players-ties, head-to-head records; 4. in three-players-ties, percentage of sets won, or of games won; 5. steering-committee decision.

=== Yellow group ===
		(Italy) Volandri	(Netherlands) Huta Galung	(Colombia) González	(Slovakia) Martin	RR W–L	Set W–L	Game W–L	Standings
2	(Italy) Filippo Volandri		4–6, 7–6^{(7–5)}, 6–3	3–6, 3–6	6–0, 6–4	2–1	4–3 (57.1%)	37–29 (56.1%)	2
4	(Netherlands) Jesse Huta Galung	6–4, 6–7^{(5–7)}, 3–6		3–6, 6–2, 4–6	6–3, 6–4	1–2	4–4 (50.0%)	38–40 (48.7%)	3
5	(Colombia) Alejandro González	6–3, 6–3	6–3, 2–6, 6–4		6–2, 6–3	3–0	6–1 (85.7%)	38–24 (61.3%)	1
7	(Slovakia) Andrej Martin	0–6, 4–6	3–6, 4–6	2–6, 3–6		0–3	0–6 (0.0%)	16–36 (30.8%)	4

Standings are determined by: 1. number of wins; 2. number of matches; 3. in two-players-ties, head-to-head records; 4. in three-players-ties, percentage of sets won, or of games won; 5. steering-committee decision.
