= ATP Challenger Parma =

Parma Open may refer to:

- Emilia-Romagna Open (2019–2020, 2022–2023)
- Internazionali di Tennis Città di Parma (2020)
- Parma Challenger (2022)
