= 2020 Internazionali di Tennis Città di Parma – Singles =

Singles
- 2020 Internazionali di Tennis Città di Parma

Final
- Champion: (Germany) Cedrik-Marcel Stebe
- Runner-up: (United Kingdom) Liam Broady
- Score: 6–4, 6–4

Events
Singles	Doubles
Internazionali di Tennis Città di Parma	· 2021 →

This was the first edition of the tournament.

Cedrik-Marcel Stebe won the title after defeating Liam Broady 6–4, 6–4 in the final.

== Seeds ==
1. (France) Grégoire Barrère (second round)
2. (Bosnia and Herzegovina) Damir Džumhur (withdrew)
3. (United States) J. J. Wolf (first round, retired)
4. (Italy) Lorenzo Musetti (second round)
5. (Italy) Federico Gaio (first round)
6. (Serbia) Nikola Milojević (first round)
7. (Germany) Cedrik-Marcel Stebe (champion)
8. (United States) Maxime Cressy (quarterfinals)

== Draw ==
=== Key ===
- Q = Qualifier
- WC = Wild card
- LL = Lucky loser
- Alt = Alternate
- ITF = ITF entry
- PR = Protected ranking
- SR = Special ranking
- SE = Special exempt
- JE = Junior exempt
- JR = Junior Accelerator Programme entrant
- CO = College Accelerator Programme entrant
- NG = Next Gen Accelerator Program entrant
- w/o = Walkover
- r = Retired
- d = Defaulted

=== Finals ===
Semifinals
LL	(Italy) Andrea Arnaboldi	6	3	4
(United Kingdom) Liam Broady	4	6	6
7	(Germany) Cedrik-Marcel Stebe	5	6	6
(France) Quentin Halys	7	3	3

Final
(United Kingdom) Liam Broady	4	4
7	(Germany) Cedrik-Marcel Stebe	6	6

=== Top half ===
First round
1	(France) G Barrère	7^{10}	7^{7}
LL	(Russia) E Karlovskiy	6^{8}	6^{5}
LL	(Italy) A Arnaboldi	6	6
Alt	(Tunisia) M Jaziri	3	4
(Portugal) F Ferreira Silva	6^{4}	6	7
Q	(United Kingdom) J Draper	7^{7}	4	5
(France) C Lestienne	7^{9}	7
6	(Serbia) N Milojević	6^{7}	5
3	(United States) J. J. Wolf	3	0^{r}
PR	(Slovenia) B Kavčič	6	2
(United Kingdom) L Broady	6	6
Alt	(Serbia) P Krstin	2	4
WC	(Italy) L Nardi	7	5	6
WC	(Italy) G Zeppieri	5	7	4
(France) M Janvier	2	4
8	(United States) M Cressy	6	6

Second round
1	(France) G Barrère	6	2	2
LL	(Italy) A Arnaboldi	4	6	6
(Portugal) F Ferreira Silva	w/o
(France) C Lestienne
PR	(Slovenia) B Kavčič	1	7	3
(United Kingdom) L Broady	6	5	6
WC	(Italy) L Nardi	3	6^{4}
8	(United States) M Cressy	6	7^{7}

Quarterfinals
LL	(Italy) A Arnaboldi	3	6	6
(Portugal) F Ferreira Silva	6	3	4
(United Kingdom) L Broady	7^{7}	4	7^{7}
8	(United States) M Cressy	6^{3}	6	6^{2}

Semifinals
LL	(Italy) A Arnaboldi	6	3	4
(United Kingdom) L Broady	4	6	6

=== Bottom half ===
First round
7	(Germany) C-M Stebe	3	6	6
WC	(Italy) A Pellegrino	6	4	4
(Belgium) K Coppejans	5	6	6
LL	(Italy) M Gigante	7	3	3
(Italy) R Marcora	6	6
Q	(Italy) S Napolitano	3	4
LL	(Italy) Fabrizio Ornago	3	5
4	(Italy) L Musetti	6	7
5	(Italy) F Gaio	7^{7}	6^{2}	4
(France) Q Halys	6^{5}	7^{7}	6
(Italy) M Viola	6	1
(Kazakhstan) D Popko	4	0^{r}
Q	(Italy) L Vanni	6	6
Q	(France) T Lamasine	2	4
(France) M Bourgue	7^{7}	6
LL	(Denmark) H Rune	6^{5}	1

Second round
7	(Germany) C-M Stebe	7^{7}	6
(Belgium) K Coppejans	6^{3}	4
(Italy) R Marcora	3	6	6
4	(Italy) L Musetti	6	3	4
(France) Q Halys	4	6	7^{7}
(Italy) M Viola	6	3	6^{4}
Q	(Italy) L Vanni	7^{7}	2	7^{8}
(France) M Bourgue	6^{4}	6	6^{6}

Quarterfinals
7	(Germany) C-M Stebe	6	6
(Italy) R Marcora	2	2
(France) Q Halys	7^{7}	7^{7}
Q	(Italy) L Vanni	6^{2}	6^{4}

Semifinals
7	(Germany) C-M Stebe	5	6	6
(France) Q Halys	7	3	3
