= 2015 ATP Challenger Tour Finals – Singles =

Singles
- 2015 ATP Challenger Tour Finals

Final
- Champion: (Spain) Íñigo Cervantes
- Runner-up: (Spain) Daniel Muñoz de la Nava
- Score: 6–2, 3–6, 7–6^{(7–4)}

Events
Singles	Doubles
← 2014 ·	ATP Challenger Tour Finals	· 2016 →

Diego Schwartzman was the defending champion, but did not qualify this year.
Íñigo Cervantes won the title, defeating Daniel Muñoz de la Nava in the final, 6–2, 3–6, 7–6^{(7–4)}. Cervantes also became the first undefeated champion of the event.

== Seeds ==
1. (Italy) Paolo Lorenzi (round robin)
2. (Argentina) Guido Pella (semifinals, withdrew due to torn right adductor)
3. (Spain) Daniel Muñoz de la Nava (final)
4. (Italy) Marco Cecchinato (round robin)
5. (Spain) Íñigo Cervantes (champion)
6. (Moldova) Radu Albot (round robin)
7. (Uzbekistan) Farrukh Dustov (round robin)
8. (Brazil) Guilherme Clezar (semifinals)

== Draw ==
=== Key ===
- Q = Qualifier
- WC = Wild card
- LL = Lucky loser
- Alt = Alternate
- SE = Special exempt
- PR = Protected ranking
- ITF = ITF entry
- JE = Junior exempt
- w/o = Walkover
- r = Retired
- d = Defaulted
- SR = Special ranking

=== Finals ===
Semifinals
5	(Spain) Íñigo Cervantes	6	7^{11}
8/WC	(Brazil) Guilherme Clezar	3	6^{9}
2	(Argentina) Guido Pella
3	(Spain) Daniel Muñoz de la Nava	w/o

Final
5	(Spain) Íñigo Cervantes	6	3	7^{7}
3	(Spain) Daniel Muñoz de la Nava	2	6	6^{4}

=== Group A ===
		(Italy) Lorenzi	(Spain) de la Nava	(Spain) Cervantes	(Uzbekistan) Dustov	RR W–L	Set W–L	Game W–L	Standings
1	(Italy) Paolo Lorenzi		6–4, 3–6, 2–6	4–6, 3–6	4–6, 6–3, 6–4	1–2	3–5	34–41	3
3	(Spain) Daniel Muñoz de la Nava	4–6, 6–3, 6–2		6–4, 6–7^{(3–7)}, 5–7	7–6^{(7–3)}, 6–1	2–1	5–3	46–36	2
5	(Spain) Íñigo Cervantes	6–4, 6–3	4–6, 7–6^{(7–3)}, 7–5		6–3, 6–3	3–0	6–1	42–30	1
7	(Uzbekistan) Farrukh Dustov	6–4, 3–6, 4–6	6–7^{(3–7)}, 1–6	3–6, 3–6		0–3	1–6	26–41	4

Standings are determined by: 1. number of wins; 2. number of matches; 3. in two-players-ties, head-to-head records; 4. in three-players-ties, percentage of sets won, or of games won initially to sort out a superior/inferior player, then head-to-head records; 5. ATP rankings.

=== Group B ===
		(Argentina) Pella	(Italy) Cecchinato	(Moldova) Albot	(Brazil) Clezar	RR W–L	Set W–L	Game W–L	Standings
2	(Argentina) Guido Pella		6–1, 1–0, ret.	3–6, 6–1, 6–3	6–4, 6–3	2–1	4–3	27–17	1
4	(Italy) Marco Cecchinato	1–6, 0–1, ret.		6–4, 3–6, 2–6	5–7, 4–6	1–2	3–4	20–29	4
6	(Moldova) Radu Albot	6–3, 1–6, 3–6	4–6, 6–3, 6–2		2–6, 4–6	1–2	3–5	32–38	3
8/WC	(Brazil) Guilherme Clezar	4–6, 3–6	7–5, 6–4	6–2, 6–4		2–1	4–2	32–27	2

Standings are determined by: 1. number of wins; 2. number of matches; 3. in two-players-ties, head-to-head records; 4. in three-players-ties, percentage of sets won, or of games won initially to sort out a superior/inferior player, then head-to-head records; 5. ATP rankings.
