= 2020 Internazionali di Tennis Città di Parma – Doubles =

Doubles
- 2020 Internazionali di Tennis Città di Parma

Final
- Champions: (France) Grégoire Barrère (France) Albano Olivetti
- Runners-up: (France) Sadio Doumbia (France) Fabien Reboul
- Score: 6–2, 6–4

Events
Singles	Doubles
- Internazionali di Tennis Città di Parma

This was the first edition of the tournament.

Grégoire Barrère and Albano Olivetti won the title after defeating Sadio Doumbia and Fabien Reboul 6–2, 6–4 in the final.

== Seeds ==
1. (Monaco) Romain Arneodo / (Switzerland) Luca Margaroli (semifinals)
2. (France) Sadio Doumbia / (France) Fabien Reboul (final)
3. (France) Quentin Halys / (France) Tristan Lamasine (semifinals, withdrew)
4. (France) Grégoire Barrère / (France) Albano Olivetti (champions)

== Draw ==
Key

- Q = Qualifier
- WC = Wild card
- LL = Lucky loser
- Alt = Alternate
- ITF = ITF entry
- PR = Protected ranking
- SR = Special ranking
- SE = Special exempt
- JE = Junior exempt
- JR = Junior Accelerator Programme entrant
- CO = College Accelerator Programme entrant
- NG = Next Gen Accelerator Program entrant
- w/o = Walkover
- r = Retired
- d = Defaulted

First round
(Italy) M Bortolotti (Italy) L Vanni	w/o
(Italy) F Baldi (Italy) A Pellegrino
(Italy) Lorenzo Bocchi (Italy) Fabrizio Ornago	6	6
WC	(Italy) L Nardi (Italy) G Zeppieri	4	4
(Belgium) K Coppejans (Bulgaria) D Kuzmanov
(United Kingdom) L Broady (Kazakhstan) D Popko	w/o
(Italy) F Cobolli (Italy) E Dalla Valle	3	5
(United States) M Cressy (France) M Janvier	6	7

Quarterfinals
1	(Monaco) R Arneodo (Switzerland) L Margaroli	7^{8}	6
(Italy) M Bortolotti (Italy) L Vanni	6^{6}	2
4	(France) G Barrère (France) A Olivetti	7^{8}	6
(Italy) L Bocchi (Italy) F Ornago	6^{6}	2
(United Kingdom) L Broady (Kazakhstan) D Popko
3	(France) Q Halys (France) T Lamasine	w/o
(United States) M Cressy (France) M Janvier	6^{3}	4
2	(France) S Doumbia (France) F Reboul	7^{7}	6

Semifinals
1	(Monaco) R Arneodo (Switzerland) L Margaroli	6^{6}	4
4	(France) G Barrère (France) A Olivetti	7^{8}	6
3	(France) Q Halys (France) T Lamasine
2	(France) S Doumbia (France) F Reboul	w/o

Final
4	(France) G Barrère (France) A Olivetti	6	6
2	(France) S Doumbia (France) F Reboul	2	4
