= 2014 ATP Challenger Tour Finals – Singles =

Singles
- 2014 ATP Challenger Tour Finals

Final
- Champion: (Argentina) Diego Schwartzman
- Runner-up: (Brazil) Guilherme Clezar
- Score: 6–2, 6–3

Events
Singles	Doubles
← 2013 ·	ATP Challenger Tour Finals	· 2015 →

Filippo Volandri was the defending champion, but he did not qualify that year.
Diego Schwartzman won the title, defeating Guilherme Clezar in the final, 6–2, 6–3.

== Seeds ==
1. (Italy) Simone Bolelli (semifinals)
2. (Argentina) Diego Schwartzman (champion)
3. (Dominican Republic) Víctor Estrella Burgos (semifinals)
4. (Slovenia) Blaž Rola (round robin)
5. (Austria) Andreas Haider-Maurer (round robin)
6. (Brazil) João Souza (round robin)
7. (Argentina) Máximo González (round robin)
8. (Brazil) Guilherme Clezar (final)

== Draw ==
=== Key ===
- Q = Qualifier
- WC = Wild card
- LL = Lucky loser
- Alt = Alternate
- SE = Special exempt
- PR = Protected ranking
- ITF = ITF entry
- JE = Junior exempt
- w/o = Walkover
- r = Retired
- d = Defaulted
- SR = Special ranking

=== Finals ===
Semifinals
3	(Dominican Republic) Víctor Estrella Burgos	6^{4}	7^{7}	6^{12}
8/WC	(Brazil) Guilherme Clezar	7^{7}	6^{0}	7^{14}
2	(Argentina) Diego Schwartzman	7	6
1	(Italy) Simone Bolelli	5	4

Final
8/WC	(Brazil) Guilherme Clezar	2	3
2	(Argentina) Diego Schwartzman	6	6

=== Group A ===
		(Italy) Bolelli	(Dominican Republic) Estrella Burgos	(Austria) Haider-Maurer	(Argentina) González	RR W–L	Set W–L	Game W–L	Standings
1	(Italy) Simone Bolelli		4–6, 2–6	6–4, 6–4	6–4, 5–7, 7–6^{(7–3)}	2–1	4–3 (57.1%)	36–37 (49.3%)	2
3	(Dominican Republic) Víctor Estrella Burgos	6–4, 6–2		6–2, 6–0	3–6, 4–6	2–1	4–2 (66.7%)	31–20 (60.8%)	1
5	(Austria) Andreas Haider-Maurer	4–6, 4–6	2–6, 0–6		4–6, 6–1, 6–1	1–2	2–5 (28.6%)	26–32 (44.8%)	3
7	(Argentina) Máximo González	4–6, 7–5, 6–7^{(3–7)}	6–3, 6–4	6–4, 1–6, 1–6		1–2	4–4 (50.0%)	37–41 (47.4%)	4

Standings are determined by: 1. number of wins; 2. number of matches; 3. in two-players-ties, head-to-head records; 4. in three-players-ties, percentage of sets won, or of games won initially to sort out a superior/inferior player, then head-to-head records; 5. ATP rankings.

=== Group B ===
		(Argentina) Schwartzman	(Slovenia) Rola	(Brazil) Souza	(Brazil) Clezar	RR W–L	Set W–L	Game W–L	Standings
2	(Argentina) Diego Schwartzman		4–6, 6–2, 3–6	3–6, 7–6^{(7–2)}, 6–2	6–3, 6–2	2–1	5–3 (62.5%)	41–33 (55.4%)	1
4	(Slovenia) Blaž Rola	6–4, 2–6, 6–3		6–3, 6–4	4–6, 3–6	2–1	4–3 (57.1%)	33–32 (50.1%)	3
6	(Brazil) João Souza	6–3, 6–7^{(2–7)}, 2–6	3–6, 4–6		6–7^{(4–7)}, 6–2, 6–7^{(7–9)}	0–3	2–6 (25.0%)	39–44 (47.0%)	4
8/WC	(Brazil) Guilherme Clezar	3–6, 2–6	6–4, 6–3	7–6^{(7–4)}, 2–6, 7–6^{(9–7)}		2–1	4–3 (57.1%)	33–37 (47.1%)	2

Standings are determined by: 1. number of wins; 2. number of matches; 3. in two-players-ties, head-to-head records; 4. in three-players-ties, percentage of sets won, or of games won initially to sort out a superior/inferior player, then head-to-head records; 5. ATP rankings.
