= 2015 ATP Challenger Tour Finals =

- Date: 25–29 November 2015
- Edition: 5th
- Draw: 8S
- Prize money: $220,000+H
- Surface: Clay / Indoor
- Location: São Paulo, Brazil
- Venue: Esporte Clube Pinheiros

Champions

Singles
- (Spain) Íñigo Cervantes
← 2014 ·	ATP Challenger Tour Finals	· 2016 →

The 2015 ATP Challenger Tour Finals was a tennis tournament played at the Esporte Clube Pinheiros in São Paulo, Brazil, between 25 and 29 November 2015. It was the fifth edition of the event, which serves as the season ending championships for players on the ATP Challenger Tour.

== Points ==
Stage	Points
Final win	50
Semifinal win	30
Round robin win per match	15
Total Available	125

== Qualified players ==
On 10 November 2015, ATP editor Josh Meiseles confirmed the final list of 8 players on the ATP World Tour official website.

- (Spain) Daniel Muñoz de la Nava
- (Spain) Íñigo Cervantes
- (Italy) Paolo Lorenzi
- (Uzbekistan) Farrukh Dustov
- (Moldova) Radu Albot
- (Italy) Marco Cecchinato
- (Argentina) Guido Pella
- (Brazil) Guilherme Clezar

== Day-by-day summary ==
All times listed below are in Brasília Summer Time (UTC−02:00).

=== Round robin ===
==== Day 1 (25 November) ====
Matches at the Esporte Clube Pinheiros
Stage	Winner	Loser	Score
Group A	(Spain) Íñigo Cervantes [5]	(Spain) Daniel Muñoz de la Nava [3]	4–6, 7–6^{(7–3)}, 7–5
Group A	(Italy) Paolo Lorenzi [1]	(Uzbekistan) Farrukh Dustov [7]	4–6, 6–3, 6–4
Group B	(Brazil) Guilherme Clezar [8/WC]	(Italy) Marco Cecchinato [4]	7–5, 6–4
Group B	(Argentina) Guido Pella [2]	(Moldova) Radu Albot [6]	3–6, 6–1, 6–3

==== Day 2 (26 November) ====
Matches at the Esporte Clube Pinheiros
Stage	Winner	Loser	Score
Group A	(Spain) Daniel Muñoz de la Nava [3]	(Uzbekistan) Farrukh Dustov [7]	7–6^{(7–3)}, 6–1
Group A	(Spain) Íñigo Cervantes [5]	(Italy) Paolo Lorenzi [1]	6–4, 6–3
Group B	(Moldova) Radu Albot [6]	(Italy) Marco Cecchinato [4]	4–6, 6–3, 6–2
Group B	(Argentina) Guido Pella [2]	(Brazil) Guilherme Clezar [8/WC]	6–4, 6–3

==== Day 3 (27 November) ====
Matches on Esporte Clube Pinheiros
Stage	Winner	Loser	Score
Group A	(Spain) Íñigo Cervantes [5]	(Uzbekistan) Farrukh Dustov [7]	6–3, 6–3
Group A	(Spain) Daniel Muñoz de la Nava [3]	(Italy) Paolo Lorenzi [1]	4–6, 6–3, 6–2
Group B	(Brazil) Guilherme Clezar [8/WC]	(Moldova) Radu Albot [6]	6–2, 6–4
Group B	(Italy) Marco Cecchinato [4]	(Argentina) Guido Pella [2]	1–6, 0–1 Retired

=== Semifinals (28 November) ===
Matches on Esporte Clube Pinheiros
Stage	Winner	Loser	Score
Semifinals	(Spain) Daniel Muñoz de la Nava [3]	(Argentina) Guido Pella [2]	Walkover
Semifinals	(Spain) Íñigo Cervantes [5]	(Brazil) Guilherme Clezar [8/WC]	6–3, 7–6^{(11–9)}

=== Final (29 November) ===
Matches on Esporte Clube Pinheiros
Stage	Winner	Loser	Score
Final	(Spain) Íñigo Cervantes [5]	(Spain) Daniel Muñoz de la Nava [3]	6–2, 3–6, 7–6^{(7–4)}

== Champion ==
- (Spain) Íñigo Cervantes def. (Spain) Daniel Muñoz de la Nava, 6–2, 3–6, 7–6^{(7–4)}

== See also ==
- 2015 ATP Challenger Tour
- 2015 ATP World Tour Finals
- 2015 WTA Tour Championships
