= 2013 ATP Challenger Tour Finals =

- Date: 13–17 November 2013
- Edition: 3rd
- Surface: Clay
- Location: São Paulo, Brazil
- Venue: Sociedade Harmonia de Tênis

Champions

Singles
- (Italy) Filippo Volandri
← 2012 ·	ATP Challenger Tour Finals	· 2014 →

The 2013 ATP Challenger Tour Finals is a tennis tournament played at the Sociedade Harmonia de Tênis in São Paulo, Brazil, between 13 and 17 November 2013. It will be the third edition of the event.

It is run by the Association of Tennis Professionals (ATP) and is part of the 2013 ATP Challenger Tour. The tournament serves as the season ending championships for players on the ATP Challenger Tour.

The venue went from Ginásio do Ibirapuera to Sociedade Harmonia de Tênis, because of the change of venue, the tournament will be played in outdoor clay courts for the first time. In the previous editions, it was played in indoor hard courts.

== Format ==
The seven best players of the season and a wild card awardee qualify for the event and are split into two groups of four. During this stage, players compete in a round robin format (meaning players play against all the other players in their group).

The two players with the best results in each group progress to the semifinals where the winners of a group face the runners-up of the other group. The winners of the semifinals reach the tournament final.

== Points and prize money ==
The total prize money for the 2013 ATP Challenger Tour Finals was US$220,000.

Stage	Prize Money	Points
Champion	RR + $66,000	RR + 80
Runner-up	RR + $21,000	RR + 30
Round robin win per match	$6,300	15
Participation	$6,300	—
Alternates	$3,500	—

- RR is points or prize money won in the round robin stage.

== Qualification ==
The top seven players with the most points accumulated in ATP Challenger tournaments during the year plus one wild card entrant from the host country qualified for the 2013 ATP Challenger Tour Finals. Countable points include points earned in 2013 until 21 October, plus points earned at late-season 2012 Challenger tournaments. However, players were only eligible to qualify for the tournament if they played a minimum of eight ATP Challenger Tour tournaments during the season. Moreover, the accumulated year-to-date points were only countable to a maximum of ten best results.

== Qualified players ==
2013 ATP Year-To-Date Challenger Rankings					ATP Ranking^{2}
#^{1}	Sd^{2}	Player	Points	Tours	ATP Ranking^{2}
1		Dudi Sela (ISR)	534	14	
2		Jiří Veselý (CZE)	484	10	
3	5	Alejandro González (COL)	470	17	107
4		Pablo Carreño Busta (ESP)	462	12	
5	4	Jesse Huta Galung (NED)	462	15	106
6	2	Filippo Volandri (ITA)	440	11	90
7	1	Teymuraz Gabashvili (RUS)	438	21	84
8		Mikhail Kukushkin (KAZ)	417	14	
9	3	Aleksandr Nedovyesov (UKR)	395	22	96
10	6	Adrian Ungur (ROU)	383	14	108
11	7	Andrej Martin (SVK)	383	24	126
60	8	Guilherme Clezar (BRA)	230	20	159
^{1} ATP Year-To-Date Challenger Rankings as of 21 October 2013.^{2} Seedings were determined according to the ATP Singles Rankings as of 11 November 2013.
^{1} ATP Year-To-Date Challenger Rankings as of 21 October 2013.^{2} Seedings were determined according to the ATP Singles Rankings as of 11 November 2013.			Key		
^{1} ATP Year-To-Date Challenger Rankings as of 21 October 2013.^{2} Seedings were determined according to the ATP Singles Rankings as of 11 November 2013.			Qualified		
^{1} ATP Year-To-Date Challenger Rankings as of 21 October 2013.^{2} Seedings were determined according to the ATP Singles Rankings as of 11 November 2013.			Wildcard awardee		
^{1} ATP Year-To-Date Challenger Rankings as of 21 October 2013.^{2} Seedings were determined according to the ATP Singles Rankings as of 11 November 2013.			Declined participation		

The tournament line-up was initially announced on 23 October 2013 at the tournament's website, based on the 2013 ATP Year-To-Date Challenger Rankings up to that date. On 28 October 2013, the ATP announced the same line-up at its website.

Alejandro González, Jesse Huta Galung, Filippo Volandri, and Teymuraz Gabashvili qualified directly in the event. Dudi Sela, Jiří Veselý, Pablo Carreño Busta, and Mikhail Kukushkin chose not to compete that gave spots to Aleksandr Nedovyesov, Adrian Ungur, and Andrej Martin. Brazilian Guilherme Clezar was given the eight spot as a wildcard.

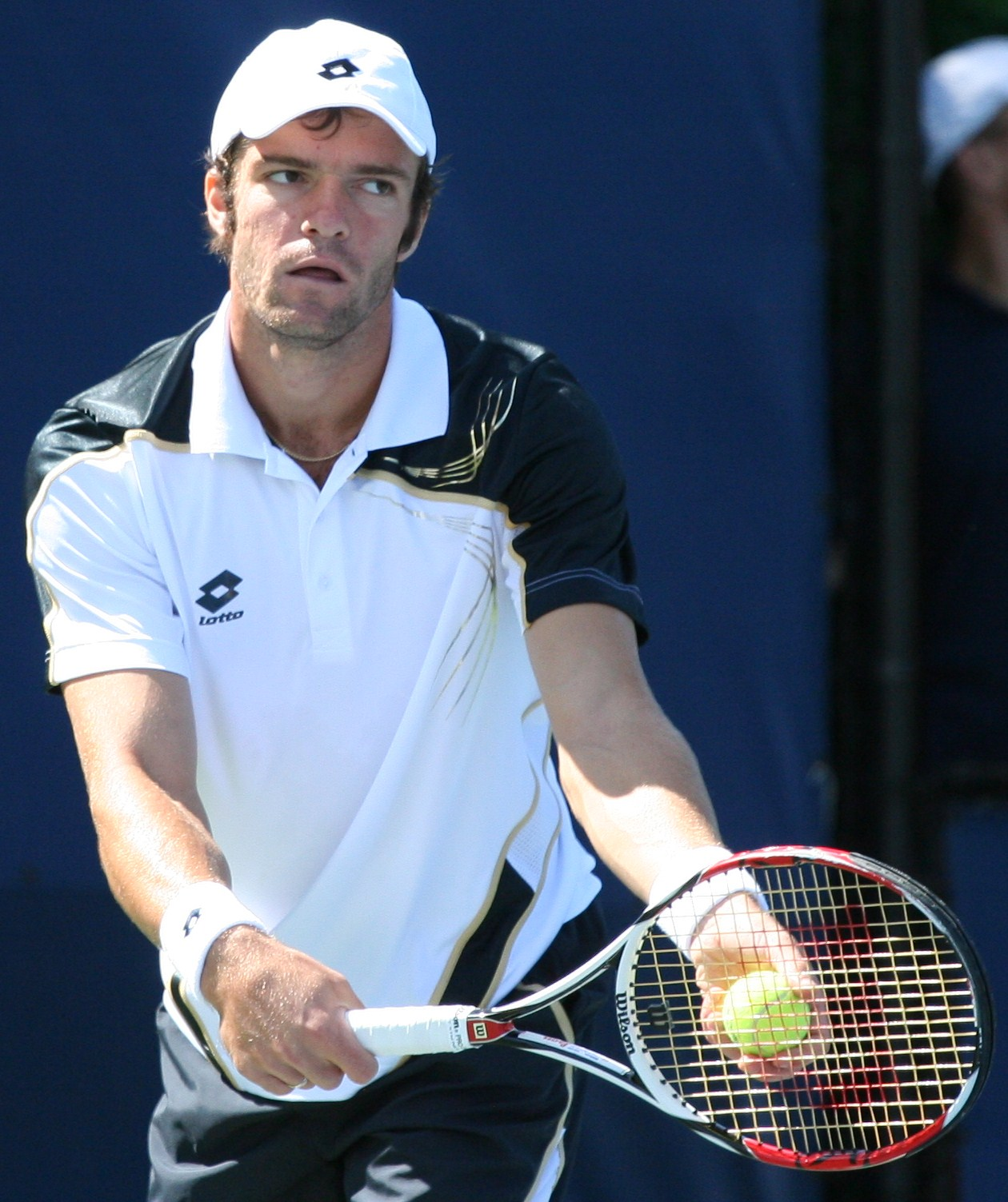
Teymuraz Gabashvili won two challenger events.

Teymuraz Gabashvili Gabashvili also a former fourth rounder of a slam, also at French Open, but this time in 2010, where he upset Andy Roddick in the third round as a qualifier. The Russian won two Challenger titles in the year both coming in Uzbekistan, at the Karshi Challenger and Samarkand Challenger defeating Radu Albot and Aleksandr Nedovyesov, respectively in straight sets. He also reached the final of the Morocco Tennis Tour – Kenitra retiring a game away from losing to Dominic Thiem. In his third Challenger final in Uzbekistan at the Tashkent Challenger, he lost this time to Israeli Dudi Sela. At the ATP World Tour, the Russian reached the quarterfinals of his home tournament of Kremlin Cup losing to world no. 10 Richard Gasquet

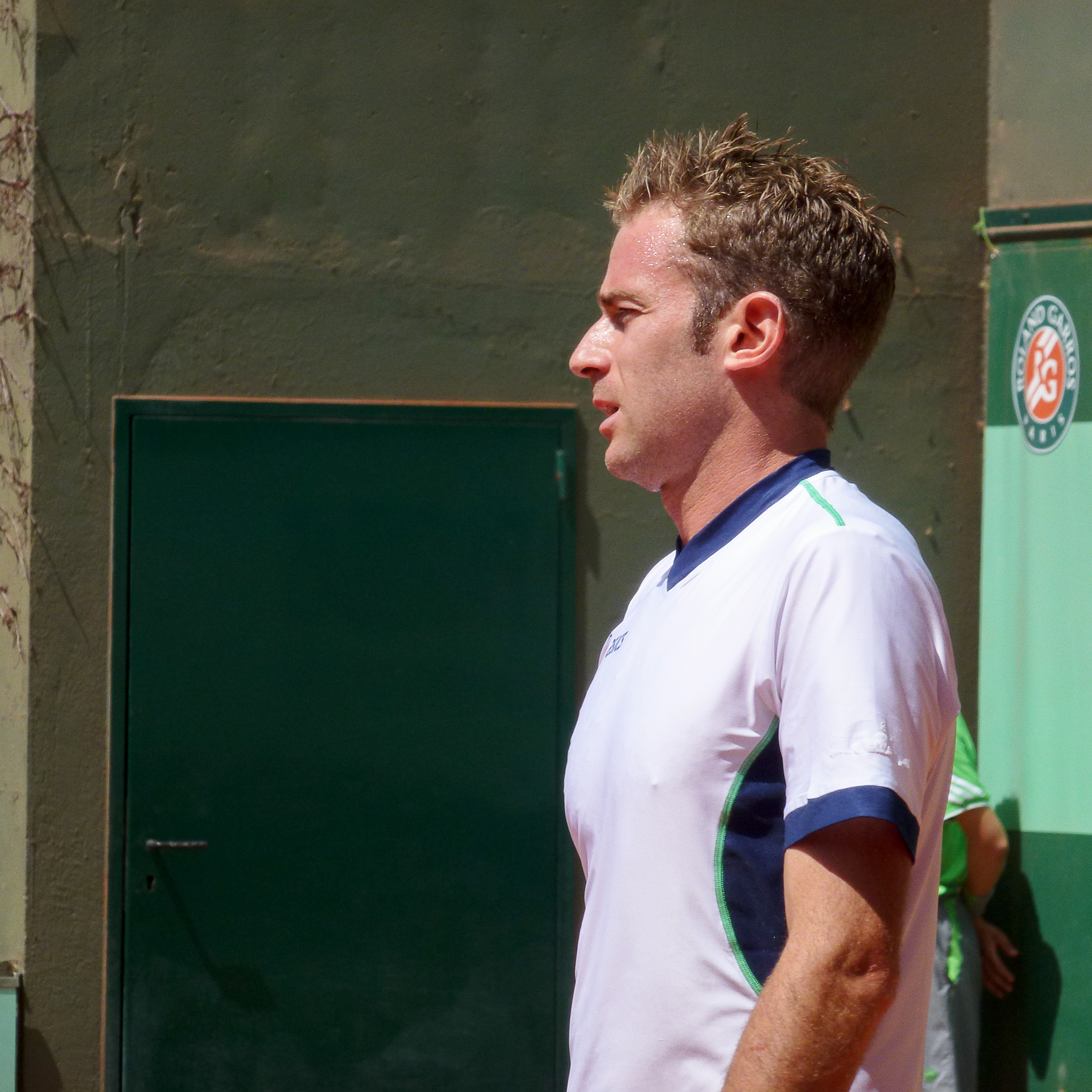
Filippo Volandri makes his debut at the event.

Filippo Volandri Volandri is the elder statesman in the draw, at age 32. A two-time champion on the ATP World Tour and has formerly reached the fourth round of the 2007 French Open defeating a then world no. 7 Ivan Ljubičić em route. In the ATP Challenger Tour, the Italian reached five finals all finished in straight sets. He won two titles both in his home country of Italy in the Aspria Tennis Cup defeating Andrej Martin and the Trofeo Stefano Bellaveglia defeating Pere Riba. The other three finals, he was a runner-up to Aljaž Bedene at the Roma Open, to Marco Cecchinato at the San Marino CEPU Open and to Dustin Brown at the AON Open Challenger. The 32 year-old also reached the quarterfinals of the Brasil Open in ATP World Tour losing to Martín Alund.

Aleksandr Nedovyesov The 2009 National Player of the Year at Oklahoma State University, has a huge climb in the ranking starting outside the top 200 to entering the top 100. He reached his first Challenger singles final at the Samarkand Challenger losing to Teymuraz Gabashvili. However, he won his next three Challenger finals at the Prague Open over Spaniard Javier Martí, at the Pekao Szczecin Open over another Spaniard Pere Riba, and at the Kazan Kremlin Cup over Andrey Golubev all in straight sets.

Jesse Huta Galung At the age of 28, the Dutchman has discovered the best form of his career in 2013, after being below 300 at a point to breaking into the top 100 for the first time in his career in August. Huta Galung had a 4–1 record in the finals of the ATP Challenger Tour. Three of his titles came against French players, against Vincent Millot at the Challenger La Manche in straight sets, at the Open Harmonie mutuelle against Kenny de Schepper in a tight three setter winning it in a tie-break, and at the Tampere Open against Maxime Teixeira in straight sets. He won another title, in his home country in Netherlands at the Sport 1 Open against compatriot Robin Haase in three sets. He also reached another final at the Maserati Challenger losing to Czech Jan Hájek. He also earned a top 30 win in a dead rubber at the Davis Cup World Group play-offs against Austria defeating Jürgen Melzer in three sets. He also reached the doubles final of the ABN AMRO World Tennis Tournament in the ATP World Tour, pairing with Thiemo de Bakker but lost to Robert Lindstedt and Nenad Zimonjić but lost in a Match Tie Break.

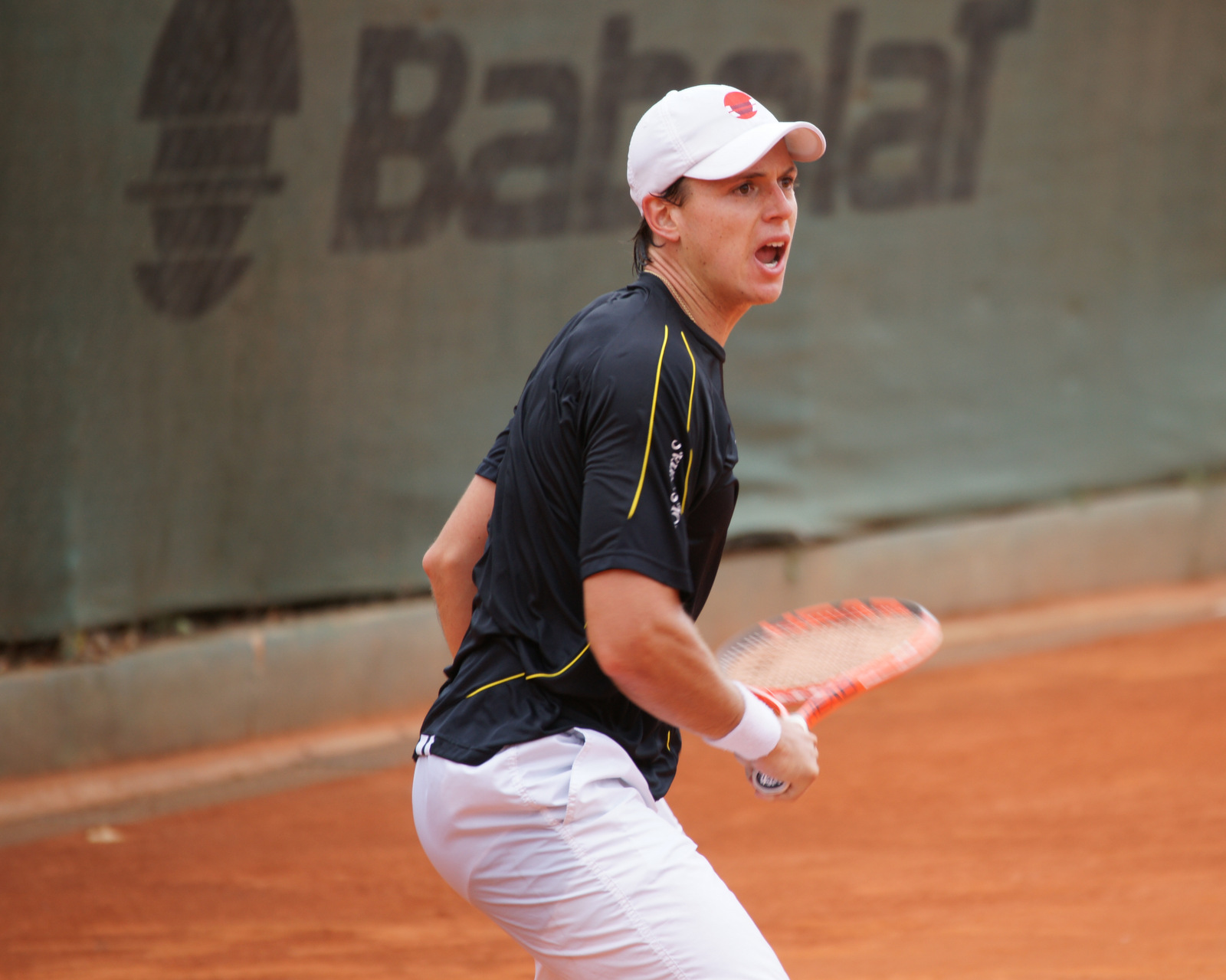
Alejandro González won three challenger events.

Alejandro González The 24-year-old Colombian is enjoying a career year on the ATP Challenger Tour, qualifying for the year-end championships after reaching five finals and ascending to a career-high Emirates ATP ranking of 106 in late September. In the five finals he reached, he won three, his first coming in the Challenger ATP de Salinas Diario Expreso defeating Renzo Olivo in a third set tie-break. He followed it up with wins against another two Argentinian in Guido Andreozzi and Eduardo Schwank in straight sets at the Seguros Bolívar Open Medellín and São Paulo Challenger de Tênis respectively. He then lost the other two finals at the Visit Panama Cup barely losing to Rubén Ramírez Hidalgo in a third set tie-break and at the Aberto Rio Preto to João Souza.

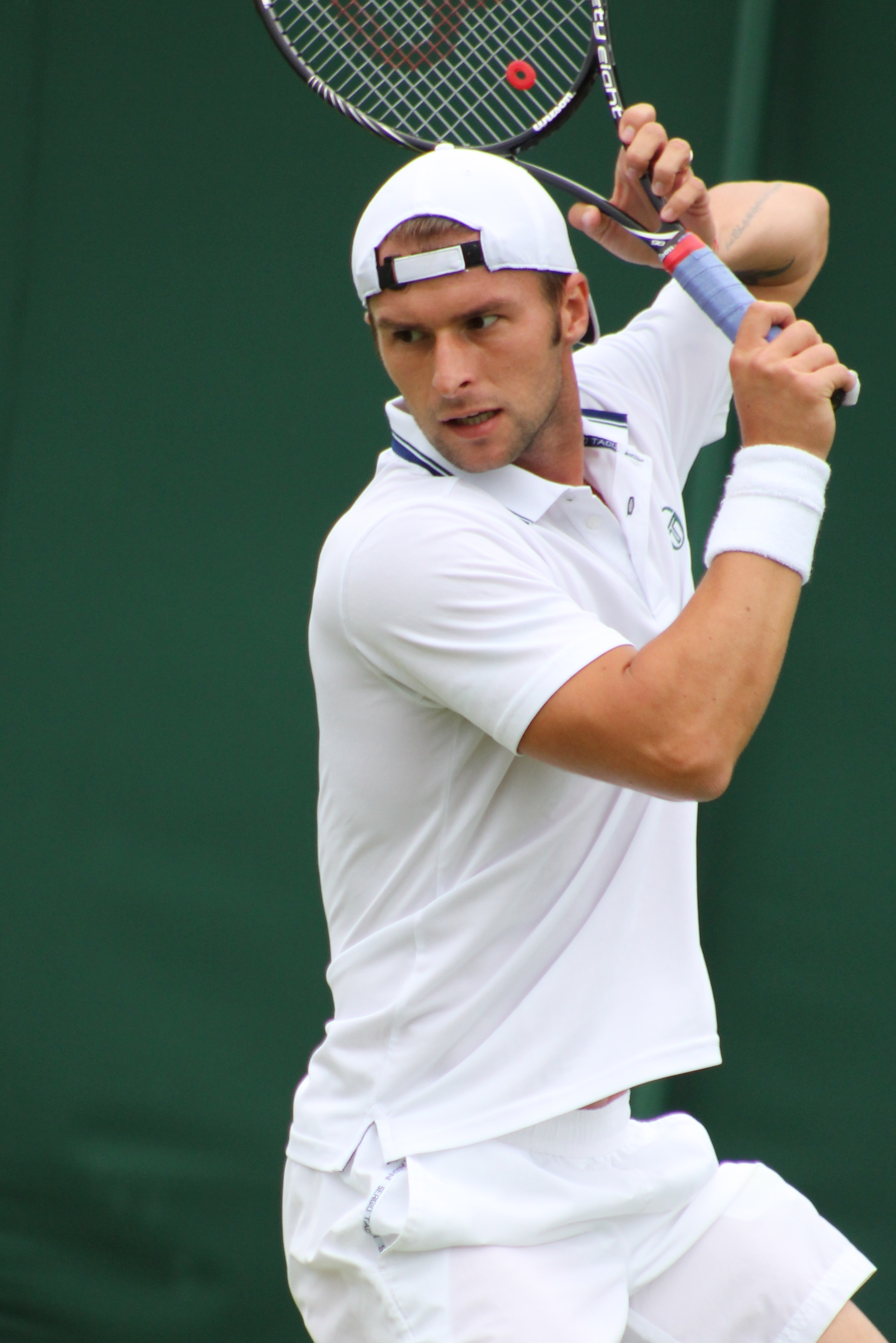
Adrian Ungur plays for the second consecutive time.

Adrian Ungur The defending ATP Challenger Tour Finals runner-up is back in São Paulo. The only former contestant in the field, the Romanian fell in a third-set tie-break to Guido Pella in last year's title bout. Ungur claimed two titles in the Challenger Circuit at the Tunis Open defeating Diego Sebastián Schwartzman in three sets dropping only 2 games in the final 2 sets at his home crowd at the BRD Arad Challenger over compatriot Marius Copil in two tight sets. He then fell into the final of the Arimex Challenger Trophy losing to Julian Reister.

Andrej Martin Three years removed from his maiden ATP Challenger Tour title, Martin clinched his second in late April, defeating Adrian Mannarino at the Copa Internacional de Tenis Total Digest in three sets. He also lifted another trophy at the Banca dell’Adriatico Tennis Cup defeating João Sousa. He also reached two other finals, losing to Mannarino at the Internationaux de Nouvelle-Calédonie and to Filippo Volandri at the Aspria Tennis Cup.

Guilherme Clezar The youngest player in the field, Clezar was awarded the tournament's wild card. The 20-year-old Brazilian is also the lowest ranked, at World No. 177. He won his second title at the Challenger level Tetra Pak Tennis Cup defeating Facundo Bagnis in the final, and did not drop a set all tournament.

== Player head-to-heads ==
These were the head-to-head records between the qualified players, immediately before the tournament. Head to head includes challengers.

		Gabashvili	Volandri	Nedovyesov	Huta Galung	González	Ungur	Martin	Clezar	Overall
1	(Russia) Teymuraz Gabashvili		1–3	1–0	0–0	1–1	1–0	0–1	0–0	4–5
2	(Italy) Filippo Volandri	3–1		1–0	2–1	0–0	2–3	2–0	0–0	10–5
3	(Ukraine) Aleksandr Nedovyesov	0–1	0–1		0–0	0–0	0–0	0–0	0–0	0–2
4	(Netherlands) Jesse Huta Galung	0–0	1–2	0–0		0–0	3–0	0–0	0–0	4–2
5	(Colombia) Alejandro González	1–1	0–0	0–0	0–0		0–0	0–0	0–1	1–2
6	(Romania) Adrian Ungur	0–1	3–2	0–0	0–3	0–0		4–0	0–1	7–7
7	(Slovakia) Andrej Martin	1–0	0–2	0–0	0–0	0–0	0–4		0–0	1–6
8	(Brazil) Guilherme Clezar	0–0	0–0	0–0	0–0	1–0	1–0	0–0		2–0

== Day-by-day summary ==
=== Day 1: 13 November 2013 ===
Matches
Group	Winner	Loser	Score
Yellow Group	(Netherlands) Jesse Huta Galung [4]	(Slovakia) Andrej Martin [7]	6–3, 6–4
Yellow Group	(Colombia) Alejandro González [5]	(Italy) Filippo Volandri [2]	6–3, 6–3
Green Group	(Russia) Teymuraz Gabashvili [1]	(Romania) Adrian Ungur [6]	6–2, 6–3
Green Group	(Ukraine) Aleksandr Nedovyesov [3]	(Brazil) Guilherme Clezar [8/WC]	6–4, 5–7, 6–3

=== Day 2: 14 November 2013 ===
Matches
Group	Winner	Loser	Score
Yellow Group	(Italy) Filippo Volandri [2]	(Slovakia) Andrej Martin [7]	6–0, 6–4
Yellow Group	(Colombia) Alejandro González [5]	(Netherlands) Jesse Huta Galung [4]	6–3, 2–6, 6–4
Green Group	(Romania) Adrian Ungur [6]	(Brazil) Guilherme Clezar [8/WC]	6–3, 7–5
Green Group	(Russia) Teymuraz Gabashvili [1]	(Ukraine) Aleksandr Nedovyesov [3]	4–6, 6–3, 6–1

=== Day 3: 15 November 2013 ===
Matches
Group	Winner	Loser	Score
Yellow Group	(Italy) Filippo Volandri [2]	(Netherlands) Jesse Huta Galung [4]	4–6, 7–6^{(7–5)}, 6–3
Yellow Group	(Colombia) Alejandro González [5]	(Slovakia) Andrej Martin [7]	6–2, 6–3
Green Group	(Ukraine) Aleksandr Nedovyesov [3]	(Romania) Adrian Ungur [6]	6–4, 5–7, 6–3
Green Group	(Brazil) Guilherme Clezar [8/WC]	(Russia) Teymuraz Gabashvili [1]	5–7, 6–4, 6–4

=== Day 4: 16 November 2013 ===
Matches
Group	Winner	Loser	Score
Semifinals	(Colombia) Alejandro González [5]	(Ukraine) Aleksandr Nedovyesov [3]	6–3, 6–7^{(4–7)}, 6–0
Semifinals	(Italy) Filippo Volandri [2]	(Russia) Teymuraz Gabashvili [1]	7–5, 2–6, 6–4

=== Day 5: 17 November 2013 ===
Matches
Group	Winner	Loser	Score
Final	(Italy) Filippo Volandri [2]	(Colombia) Alejandro González [5]	4–6, 6–4, 6–2

== Champion ==
- (Italy) Filippo Volandri def. (Colombia) Alejandro González, 4–6, 6–4, 6–2

== See also ==
- 2013 ATP Challenger Tour
- 2013 ATP World Tour Finals
- 2013 WTA Tour Championships
