= 2012 ATP Challenger Tour Finals – Singles =

Singles
- 2012 ATP Challenger Tour Finals

Final
- Champion: (Argentina) Guido Pella
- Runner-up: (Romania) Adrian Ungur
- Score: 6–3, 6–7^{(4–7)}, 7–6^{(7–4)}

Events
Singles	men	women
Doubles	men	women
- ATP Challenger Tour Finals

Cedrik-Marcel Stebe was the champion in 2011, but did not qualify for the event in 2012, since he played mostly ATP World Tour tournaments in that season.
Guido Pella defeated Adrian Ungur 6–3, 6–7^{(4–7)}, 7–6^{(7–4)} in the final to win the title.

== Seeds ==
1. (Brazil) Thomaz Bellucci (round robin, withdrew because of a shoulder injury)
2. (Italy) Paolo Lorenzi (round robin)
3. (Romania) Victor Hănescu (semifinals)
4. (Spain) Rubén Ramírez Hidalgo (round robin)
5. (Slovenia) Aljaž Bedene (semifinals)
6. (Romania) Adrian Ungur (final)
7. (Argentina) Guido Pella (champion)
8. (Portugal) Gastão Elias (round robin)

== Alternates ==
1. (Brazil) Thiago Alves (replaced Thomaz Bellucci, round robin)
2. (Brazil) Rogério Dutra da Silva (did not play)

== Draw ==
Key

- Q = Qualifier
- WC = Wild card
- LL = Lucky loser
- Alt = Alternate
- ITF = ITF entry
- PR = Protected ranking
- SR = Special ranking
- SE = Special exempt
- JE = Junior exempt
- JR = Junior Accelerator Programme entrant
- CO = College Accelerator Programme entrant
- NG = Next Gen Accelerator Program entrant
- w/o = Walkover
- r = Retired
- d = Defaulted

=== Finals ===
Semifinals
6	(Romania) Adrian Ungur	6	6
5	(Slovenia) Aljaž Bedene	4	1
3	(Romania) Victor Hănescu	6^{3}	2
7	(Argentina) Guido Pella	7^{7}	6

Final
6	(Romania) Adrian Ungur	3	7^{7}	6^{4}
7	(Argentina) Guido Pella	6	6^{4}	7^{7}

=== Green group ===
		(Brazil) Bellucci (Brazil) Alves	(Spain) Ramírez Hidalgo	(Romania) Ungur	(Argentina) Pella	RR W–L	Set W–L	Game W–L	Standings
1/WC; 9/Alt	(Brazil) Thomaz Bellucci (Brazil) Thiago Alves		3–6, 6–7^{(3–7)} (w/ Alves)	7–6^{(8–6)}, 6–2 (w/ Alves)	6–4, 6–7^{(5–7)}, 5–7 (w/ Bellucci)	0–1; 1–1	1–2 (33.3%); 2–2 (50.0%)	17–18 (48.6%); 22–21 (51.2%)	X 4
4	(Spain) Rubén Ramírez Hidalgo	6–3, 7–6^{(7–3)} (w/ Alves)		4–6, 6–4, 2–6	6–7^{(4–7)}, 2–6	1–2	3–4 (42.9%)	33–38 (46.5%)	3
6	(Romania) Adrian Ungur	6–7^{(6–8)}, 2–6 (w/ Alves)	6–4, 4–6, 6–2		4–6, 7–6^{(8–6)}, 7–6^{(7–5)}	2–1	4–4 (50.0%)	42–43 (49.4%)	1
7	(Argentina) Guido Pella	4–6, 7–6^{(7–5)}, 7–5 (w/ Bellucci)	7–6^{(7–4)}, 6–2	6–4, 6–7^{(6–8)}, 6–7^{(5–7)}		2–1	5–3 (62.5%)	49–43 (53.3%)	2

Standings are determined by: 1. number of wins; 2. number of matches; 3. in two-players-ties, head-to-head records; 4. in three-players-ties, percentage of sets won, or of games won; 5. steering-committee decision.

=== Yellow group ===
		(Italy) Lorenzi	(Romania) Hănescu	(Slovenia) Bedene	(Portugal) Elias	RR W–L	Set W–L	Game W–L	Standings
2	(Italy) Paolo Lorenzi		3–6, 4–6	1–6, 3–6	7–5, 6–2	1–2	2–4 (33.3%)	24–31 (43.6%)	3
3	(Romania) Victor Hănescu	6–3, 6–4		7–6^{(7–5)}, 7–6^{(7–5)}	6–3, 5–7, 3–6	2–1	5–2 (71.4%)	40–35 (53.3%)	1
5	(Slovenia) Aljaž Bedene	6–1, 6–3	6–7^{(5–7)}, 6–7^{(5–7)}		6–3, 6–7^{(5–7)}, 6–3	2–1	4–3 (57.1%)	42–31 (57.5%)	2
8	(Portugal) Gastão Elias	5–7, 2–6	3–6, 7–5, 6–3	3–6, 7–6^{(7–5)}, 3–6		1–2	3–5 (37.5%)	36–45 (44.4%)	4

Standings are determined by: 1. number of wins; 2. number of matches; 3. in two-players-ties, head-to-head records; 4. in three-players-ties, percentage of sets won, or of games won; 5. steering-committee decision.
