= 2012 ATP Challenger Tour Finals =

- Date: 27 November – 1 December
- Edition: 2nd
- Surface: Hard
- Location: São Paulo, Brazil
- Venue: Ginásio do Ibirapuera

Champions

Singles
- (Argentina) Guido Pella
← 2011 ·	ATP Challenger Tour Finals	· 2013 →

The 2012 ATP Challenger Tour Finals was a tennis tournament played at the Ginásio do Ibirapuera in São Paulo, Brazil, between November 27 and December 1, 2012. It was the second edition of the event. It was run by the Association of Tennis Professionals (ATP) and was part of the 2012 ATP Challenger Tour. The event took place on indoor hard courts. It served as the season ending championships for players on the ATP Challenger Tour. The seven best players of the season and a wild card awardee qualified for the event and were split into two groups of four. During this stage, players competed in a round robin format (meaning players played against all the other players in their group). The two players with the best results in each group progressed to the semifinals where the winners of a group faced the runners-up of the other group. This stage, however, was a knock out stage.

== Qualification ==
2012 ATP Year-To-Date Challenger Rankings					ATP ranking^{2}
#^{1}	Seed^{2}	Player	Points	Tours	ATP ranking^{2}
1	3	Victor Hănescu (ROM)	562	11	64
2	2	Paolo Lorenzi (ITA)	510	13	63
3		Martin Kližan (SVK)	483	12	
4	5	Aljaž Bedene (SLO)	471	15	98
5		Andrey Kuznetzov (RUS)	459	16	
6		Jerzy Janowicz (POL)	450	14	
7		Evgeny Donskoy (RUS)	445	20	
8		Tatsuma Ito (JPN)	438	11	
9	7	Guido Pella (ARG)	426	18	124
10		Daniel Gimeno Traver (ESP)	423	14	
11		Andreas Haider-Maurer (AUT)	421	20	
12		Roberto Bautista Agut (ESP)	416	11	
13		Grega Žemlja (SLO)	399	15	
14	4	Rubén Ramírez Hidalgo (ESP)	393	15	96
15	8	Gastão Elias (POR)	392	24	144
16		João Sousa (POR)	391	23	
17		Go Soeda (JPN)	385	11	
18		Igor Sijsling (NED)	385	12	
19		Simone Bolelli (ITA)	385	15	
20	6	Adrian Ungur (ROU)	382	16	112
21	9	Thiago Alves (BRA)	377	16	131
113	1	Thomaz Bellucci (BRA)	155	2	33
^{1} ATP Year-To-Date Challenger Rankings as of November 5, 2012.^{2} Seedings were determined according to the ATP Singles Rankings as of November 26, 2012.
^{1} ATP Year-To-Date Challenger Rankings as of November 5, 2012.^{2} Seedings were determined according to the ATP Singles Rankings as of November 26, 2012.			Key		
^{1} ATP Year-To-Date Challenger Rankings as of November 5, 2012.^{2} Seedings were determined according to the ATP Singles Rankings as of November 26, 2012.			Qualified		
^{1} ATP Year-To-Date Challenger Rankings as of November 5, 2012.^{2} Seedings were determined according to the ATP Singles Rankings as of November 26, 2012.			Wildcard Awardee		
^{1} ATP Year-To-Date Challenger Rankings as of November 5, 2012.^{2} Seedings were determined according to the ATP Singles Rankings as of November 26, 2012.			Alternate		
^{1} ATP Year-To-Date Challenger Rankings as of November 5, 2012.^{2} Seedings were determined according to the ATP Singles Rankings as of November 26, 2012.			Declined Participation		

The top seven players with the most points accumulated in ATP Challenger tournaments during the year plus one wild card entrant from the host country qualified for the 2012 ATP Challenger Tour Finals. Countable points include points earned in 2012 until November 5, plus points earned at late-season 2011 Challenger tournaments played after November 14. However, players were only eligible to qualify for the tournament if they played a minimum of eight ATP Challenger Tour tournaments during the season. Moreover, the accumulated year-to-date points were only countable to a maximum of ten best results.

The tournament line-up was initially announced on 7 November 2012 at the tournament's website, based on the 2012 ATP Year-To-Date Challenger Rankings up to that date.

Victor Hănescu, Paolo Lorenzi, Aljaž Bedene and Evgeny Donskoy qualified directly to the tournament, whereas Guido Pella, Andreas Haider-Maurer and Rubén Ramírez Hidalgo were given their berths after Martin Kližan, Andrey Kuznetzov, Jerzy Janowicz, Tatsuma Ito, Daniel Gimeno Traver, Roberto Bautista Agut and Grega Žemlja chose not to participate. Thomaz Bellucci, the Brazilian No. 1, was given the wildcard entry to the tournament for the second consecutive year.

In the week before the tournament and after the line-up was closed, Andreas Haider-Maurer and Evgeny Donskoy withdrew from the tournament due to injury and personal reasons, respectively. They were replaced by the designated alternates Gastão Elias and Adrian Ungur.

Victor Hănescu, Romanian No. 1 and former World No. 26, qualified as the leader of the ATP Challenger Tour ranking. He won 3 Challenger Tour titles in Szczecin, Banja Luka and Timișoara, finished runner-up on another 3 occasions in Sibiu, Bercuit and Arad and was semifinalist on yet another 3 tournaments in Cordenons, Milan and Marrakech.

Paolo Lorenzi entered the tournament just after achieving a career-high World No. 63 ranking. He won 2 Challenger Tour titles in Cordenons and Medellín, and had 5 runner-up showings in Sarasota, Guadalajara, Todi, San Luis Potosí and Salinas. He entered the tournament as the Italian No. 3 in the singles rankings.

Aljaž Bedene, Slovenian No. 3, achieved a career-high ranking of World No. 79 during the 2012 season, boosted by 4 Challenger Tour titles at Wuhan, Košice, Barletta and Casablanca, a runner-up finish in An-Ning and a semifinal appearance in Prague. He won the most ATP Challenger Tour singles titles between the qualified players.

Guido Pella is another of the players who achieved career-high rankings shortly before the tournament. The Argentinian No. 7 earned a career-high ranking of World No. 108 following 3 Challenger Tour titles at Campinas, Manta and Salinas. He also reached the final in Guayaquil and the semifinals in Rio de Janeiro and Lima.

Rubén Ramírez Hidalgo, Spanish No. 12 and former World No. 50, won 2 Challenger Tour titles in Tunis and San Luis Potosí, finished runner-up in Pereira, and reached the semifinals in Guayaquil twice (both in the 2011 and 2012 editions).

Gastão Elias achieved career-high rankings of World No. 133 and Portuguese No. 2 during the 2012 season. He won his maiden ATP Challenger Tour title in Rio de Janeiro, and had 3 runner-up finishes at Caltanissetta, Porto Alegre and São Paulo, as well as a semifinalist showing in Tampere.

Adrian Ungur, Romanian No. 2, was also the second Romanian player to qualify for the ATP Challenger Tour Finals, together with Victor Hănescu. In the 2012 season, he achieved a career-high ranking of World No. 79 and reached 6 tournament finals on the ATP Challenger Tour, winning one title in Sibiu, and finishing as runner-up in Trnava, Brașov, Marrakech, Meknes and Bucaramanga. He also reached the semifinals in Montevideo.

Thomaz Bellucci, Brazilian No. 1 and former World No. 21, received a wildcard entry to the ATP Challenger Tour Finals for a second consecutive year and he is the only player to repeat a presence in the tournament. During the 2012 season, he mostly played tournaments from the ATP World Tour. Still, he achieved success in both the ATP World Tour and ATP Challenger Tour. In the latter, he won the title in Braunschweig and reached the semifinals at the 2011 ATP Challenger Tour Finals in São Paulo. In the ATP World Tour, he won his third career tile in Gstaad, defeating Janko Tipsarević (No. 8 at the time) in the final, lost the final in Moscow to Andreas Seppi, and reached the semifinals in both Stuttgart and São Paulo. Bellucci has also contributed to the promotion of the Brazilian team to the 2013 Davis Cup World Group with 3 singles rubbers wins.

Thiago Alves became the first designated alternate for the tournament, after the preceding alternate players, Gastão Elias and Adrian Ungur, were moved to the main draw before the tournament began. Alves was given the chance to play two round robin matches, due to Thomaz Bellucci's withdrawal with a left shoulder injury after being defeated in his first round robin match. Thiago Alves won 2 titles in the 2012 ATP Challenger Tour, in São Paulo and Guadalajara. His 2012 results also included a runner-up finish in Cali and 3 semifinal finishes in Florianópolis, Campinas and Rio Quente.

== Groupings ==
The draw took place on November 25, 2012. The top seed was placed in the Green Group and the second seed placed in the Yellow Group. Players seeded three and four, five and six, seven and eight, were then drawn in pairs and divided into the two groups.

Green Group: Thomaz Bellucci [1], Rubén Ramírez Hidalgo [4], Adrian Ungur [6], Guido Pella [7].

Yellow Group: Paolo Lorenzi [2], Victor Hănescu [3], Aljaž Bedene [5], Gastão Elias [8].

== Player head-to-heads ==
These were the head-to-head records between the qualified players, immediately before the tournament.

		Bellucci	Lorenzi	Hănescu	Ramírez Hidalgo	Bedene	Ungur	Pella	Elias	Overall
1	(Brazil) Thomaz Bellucci (Brazil) Thiago Alves		0–1; 1–0	1–0; 0–0	1–1; 0–3	0–0; 0–0	0–0; 0–1	0–0; 1–2	0–0; 2–1	2–2; 4–7
2	(Italy) Paolo Lorenzi	1–0		1–1	1–3	0–0	0–1	1–4	1–1	5–10
3	(Romania) Victor Hănescu	0–1	1–1		1–0	0–0	0–0	1–1	0–0	3–3
4	(Spain) Rubén Ramírez Hidalgo	1–1	3–1	0–1		1–1	0–1	1–4	1–2	7–11
5	(Slovenia) Aljaž Bedene	0–0	0–0	0–0	1–1		0–0	0–0	0–0	1–1
6	(Romania) Adrian Ungur	0–0	4–1	1–1	4–1	0–0		0–0	0–0	9–3
7	(Argentina) Guido Pella	0–0	1–0	0–0	1–0	0–0	0–0		0–0	2–0
8	(Portugal) Gastão Elias	0–0	1–1	0–0	2–1	0–0	0–0	0–0		3–2

== Day-by-day summary ==
=== Day 1: November 27, 2012 ===
Matches
Group	Winner	Loser	Score
Yellow Group	(Romania) Victor Hănescu [3]	(Slovenia) Aljaž Bedene [5]	7–6^{(7–5)}, 7–6^{(7–5)}
Yellow Group	(Italy) Paolo Lorenzi [2]	(Portugal) Gastão Elias [8]	7–5, 6–2
Green Group	(Romania) Adrian Ungur [6]	(Spain) Rubén Ramírez Hidalgo [4]	6–4, 4–6, 6–2
Green Group	(Argentina) Guido Pella [7]	(Brazil) Thomaz Bellucci [1/WC]	4–6, 7–6^{(7–5)}, 7–5

=== Day 2: November 28, 2012 ===
Matches
Group	Winner	Loser	Score
Yellow Group	(Slovenia) Aljaž Bedene [5]	(Portugal) Gastão Elias [8]	6–3, 6–7^{(5–7)}, 6–3
Yellow Group	(Romania) Victor Hănescu [3]	(Italy) Paolo Lorenzi [2]	6–3, 6–4
Green Group	(Romania) Adrian Ungur [6]	(Argentina) Guido Pella [7]	4–6, 7–6^{(8–6)}, 7–6^{(7–5)}
Green Group	(Spain) Rubén Ramírez Hidalgo [4]	(Brazil) Thiago Alves [9/Alt]	6–3, 7–6^{(7–3)}

=== Day 3: November 29, 2012 ===
Matches
Group	Winner	Loser	Score
Yellow Group	(Portugal) Gastão Elias [8]	(Romania) Victor Hănescu [3]	3–6, 7–5, 6–3
Yellow Group	(Slovenia) Aljaž Bedene [5]	(Italy) Paolo Lorenzi [2]	6–1, 6–3
Green Group	(Brazil) Thiago Alves [9/Alt]	(Romania) Adrian Ungur [6]	7–6^{(8–6)}, 6–2
Green Group	(Argentina) Guido Pella [7]	(Spain) Rubén Ramírez Hidalgo [4]	7–6^{(7–4)}, 6–2

=== Day 4: November 30, 2012 ===
Matches
Group	Winner	Loser	Score
Semifinals	(Romania) Adrian Ungur [6]	(Slovenia) Aljaž Bedene [5]	6–4, 6–1
Semifinals	(Argentina) Guido Pella [7]	(Romania) Victor Hănescu [3]	7–6^{(7–3)}, 6–2

=== Day 5: December 1, 2012 ===
Matches
Group	Winner	Loser	Score
Final	(Argentina) Guido Pella [7]	(Romania) Adrian Ungur [6]	6–3, 6–7^{(4–7)}, 7–6^{(7–4)}

== Points and prize money ==
The total prize money for the 2012 ATP Challenger Tour Finals was US$220,000.

Stage	Prize Money	Points
Undefeated Champion	$91,200	125
Final win	$45,000	50
Semifinal win	$21,000	30
Round robin win per match	$6,300	15
Participation	$6,300	–
Alternates	$3,500	–

== Champion ==
- (Argentina) Guido Pella def. (Romania) Adrian Ungur, 6–3, 6–7^{(4–7)}, 7–6^{(7–4)}

== See also ==
- 2012 ATP Challenger Tour
- 2012 ATP World Tour Finals
- 2012 WTA Tour Championships
