= 2020 Internazionali di Tennis Città di Parma =

- Date: 2–8 November
- Edition: 1st
- Surface: Hard (indoor)
- Location: Parma, Italy

Champions

Singles
- (Germany) Cedrik-Marcel Stebe

Doubles
- (France) Grégoire Barrère / (France) Albano Olivetti
Internazionali di Tennis Città di Parma	· 2021 →

The 2020 Internazionali di Tennis Città di Parma was a professional tennis tournament played on indoor hard courts. It was the first edition of the tournament which was part of the 2020 ATP Challenger Tour. It took place in Parma, Italy between 2 and 8 November 2020.

== Singles main-draw entrants ==
=== Seeds ===
Country	Player	Rank^{1}	Seed
FRA	Grégoire Barrère	106	1
~~BIH~~	~~Damir Džumhur~~	~~115~~	~~2~~
USA	J. J. Wolf	123	3
ITA	Lorenzo Musetti	124	4
ITA	Federico Gaio	136	5
SRB	Nikola Milojević	137	6
GER	Cedrik-Marcel Stebe	143	7
USA	Maxime Cressy	167	8

- ^{1} Rankings are as of 26 October 2020.

=== Other entrants ===
The following players received wildcards into the singles main draw:

- (Italy) Luca Nardi
- (Italy) Andrea Pellegrino
- (Italy) Giulio Zeppieri

The following player received entry into the singles main draw using a protected ranking:

- (Slovenia) Blaž Kavčič

The following players received entry into the singles main draw as alternates:

- (Tunisia) Malek Jaziri
- (Serbia) Peđa Krstin

The following players received entry from the qualifying draw:

- (United Kingdom) Jack Draper
- (France) Tristan Lamasine
- (Italy) Stefano Napolitano
- (Italy) Luca Vanni

The following players received entry as lucky losers:

- (Italy) Andrea Arnaboldi
- (Italy) Matteo Gigante
- (Russia) Evgeny Karlovskiy
- (Italy) Fabrizio Ornago
- (Denmark) Holger Rune

== Champions ==
=== Singles ===
- (Germany) Cedrik-Marcel Stebe def. (United Kingdom) Liam Broady 6–4, 6–4.

=== Doubles ===
- (France) Grégoire Barrère / (France) Albano Olivetti def. (France) Sadio Doumbia / (France) Fabien Reboul 6–2, 6–4.
