= 2014 ATP Challenger Tour Finals =

- Date: 19–23 November 2014
- Edition: 4th
- Draw: 8S
- Prize money: $220,000+H
- Surface: Clay / Indoor
- Location: São Paulo, Brazil
- Venue: Esporte Clube Pinheiros

Champions

Singles
- (Argentina) Diego Schwartzman
← 2013 ·	ATP Challenger Tour Finals	· 2015 →

The 2014 ATP Challenger Tour Finals was a tennis tournament played at the Esporte Clube Pinheiros in São Paulo, Brazil, between 19 and 23 November 2014. It was run by the Association of Tennis Professionals (ATP) and was part of the 2014 ATP Challenger Tour. It was the fourth edition of the event, which served as the season ending championships for players on the ATP Challenger Tour.

The venue went from Sociedade Harmonia de Tênis to Esporte Clube Pinheiros, and because of the change of venue, the tournament was being played in indoor clay courts for the first time.

== Format ==
The seven best players of the season and a wild card awardee qualify for the event and are split into two groups of four. During this stage, players compete in a round robin format (meaning players play against all the other players in their group).

The two players with the best results in each group progress to the semifinals, where the winners of a group face the runners-up of the other group. The winners of the semifinals reach the tournament final.

== Points and prize money ==
The total prize money for the 2014 ATP Challenger Tour Finals was $220,000.

Stage	Prize Money	Points
Champion	RR + $66,000	RR + 80
Runner-up	RR + $21,000	RR + 30
Round robin win per match	$6,300	15
Participation	$6,300	—
Alternates	$3,500	—

- RR is points or prize money won in the round robin stage.

== Qualification ==
The top seven players with the most points accumulated in ATP Challenger tournaments during the year plus one wild card entrant from the host country qualified for the 2014 ATP Challenger Tour Finals. Countable points include points earned in 2014 until 27 October, plus points earned at late-season 2013 Challenger tournaments. However, players were only eligible to qualify for the tournament if they played a minimum of eight ATP Challenger Tour tournaments during the season. Moreover, the accumulated year-to-date points were only countable to a maximum of ten best results.

== Qualified players ==
The following players have qualified based on their Year-To-Date Challenger Ranking as of Monday 27 October:

- (Argentina) Diego Schwartzman (No. 2)
- (Dominican Republic) Víctor Estrella Burgos (No. 3)
- (Brazil) João Souza (No. 4)
- (Italy) Simone Bolelli (No. 7)
- (Austria) Andreas Haider-Maurer (No. 9)
- (Slovenia) Blaž Rola (No. 11)
- (Argentina) Máximo González (No. 14)

The following player has received Wild Card:

- (Brazil) Guilherme Clezar (No. 116)

The following players were allowed to compete, thanks to their positions in ranking, but they declined to participate:

- (Luxembourg) Gilles Müller (No. 1)
- (Japan) Go Soeda (No. 5)
- (Belgium) David Goffin (No. 6)
- (Spain) Albert Ramos Viñolas (No. 8)
- (Germany) Jan-Lennard Struff (No. 10)
- (Uruguay) Pablo Cuevas (No. 12)
- (Turkey) Marsel İlhan (No. 13)

== Day-by-day summary ==
All times listed below are in Brasília Summer Time (UTC−02:00).

=== Round robin ===
==== Day 1 (19 November) ====
Matches on Esporte Clube Pinheiros, start at 1pm
Stage	Winner	Loser	Score
Group A	(Argentina) Máximo González [7]	(Dominican Republic) Víctor Estrella Burgos [3]	6–3, 6–4
Group A	(Italy) Simone Bolelli [1]	(Austria) Andreas Haider-Maurer [5]	6–4, 6–4
Group B	(Argentina) Diego Schwartzman [2]	(Brazil) Guilherme Clezar [8/WC]	6–3, 6–2
Group B	(Slovenia) Blaž Rola [4]	(Brazil) João Souza [6]	6–3, 6–4

==== Day 2 (20 November) ====
Matches on Esporte Clube Pinheiros, start at 12pm
Stage	Winner	Loser	Score
Group A	(Dominican Republic) Víctor Estrella Burgos [3]	(Austria) Andreas Haider-Maurer [5]	6–2, 6–0
Group A	(Italy) Simone Bolelli [1]	(Argentina) Máximo González [7]	6–4, 5–7, 7–6^{(7–3)}
Group B	(Brazil) Guilherme Clezar [8/WC]	(Brazil) João Souza [6]	7–6^{(7–4)}, 2–6, 7–6^{(9–7)}
Group B	(Slovenia) Blaž Rola [4]	(Argentina) Diego Schwartzman [2]	6–4, 2–6, 6–3

==== Day 3 (21 November) ====
Matches on Esporte Clube Pinheiros, start at 1pm
Stage	Winner	Loser	Score
Group A	(Austria) Andreas Haider-Maurer [5]	(Argentina) Máximo González [7]	4–6, 6–1, 6–1
Group A	(Dominican Republic) Víctor Estrella Burgos [3]	(Italy) Simone Bolelli [1]	6–4, 6–2
Group B	(Argentina) Diego Schwartzman [2]	(Brazil) João Souza [6]	3–6, 7–6^{(7–2)}, 6–2
Group B	(Brazil) Guilherme Clezar [8/WC]	(Slovenia) Blaž Rola [4]	6–4, 6–3

=== Semifinals (22 November) ===
Matches on Esporte Clube Pinheiros, start at 4pm
Stage	Winner	Loser	Score
Semifinals	(Argentina) Diego Schwartzman [2]	(Italy) Simone Bolelli [1]	7–5, 6–4
Semifinals	(Brazil) Guilherme Clezar [8/WC]	(Dominican Republic) Víctor Estrella Burgos [3]	7–6^{(7–4)}, 6–7^{(0–7)}, 7–6^{(14–12)}

=== Final (23 November) ===
Matches on Esporte Clube Pinheiros, start at 5pm
Stage	Winner	Loser	Score
Final	(Argentina) Diego Schwartzman [2]	(Brazil) Guilherme Clezar [8/WC]	6–2, 6–3

== Champion ==
- (Argentina) Diego Schwartzman def. (Brazil) Guilherme Clezar, 6–2, 6–3

== See also ==
- 2014 ATP Challenger Tour
- 2014 ATP World Tour Finals
- 2014 WTA Tour Championships
