= 2011 ATP Challenger Tour Finals =

- Date: November 16–20, 2011
- Edition: 1st
- Surface: Hard
- Location: (Brazil) São Paulo
- Venue: Ginásio do Ibirapuera

Champions

Singles
- (Germany) Cedrik-Marcel Stebe
ATP Challenger Tour Finals	· 2012 →

The 2011 ATP Challenger Tour Finals was a tennis tournament played at the Ginásio do Ibirapuera in São Paulo, Brazil, between November 16 and November 20, 2011. It was the first edition of the event. The tournament was run by the Association of Tennis Professionals (ATP) and was part of the 2011 ATP Challenger Tour. The event took place on indoor hard courts. It served as the season ending championships for players on the ATP Challenger Tour. The seven best players of the season and a wild card awardee qualified for the event and were split into two groups of four. During this stage, players competed in a round robin format (meaning players played against all the other players in their group). The two players with the best results in each group progressed to the semifinals where the winners of a group faced the runners-up of the other group. This stage, however, was a knock out stage.

== Qualification ==
2011 ATP Year-To-Date Challenger Rankings					ATP ranking^{2}
#^{1}	Seed^{2}	Player	Points	Tours	ATP ranking^{2}
1	2	Rui Machado (POR)	511	14	73
2		Éric Prodon (FRA)	481	23	
3	3	Martin Kližan (SVK)	415	17	90
4		Lukáš Rosol (CZE)	399	13	
5	6	Andreas Beck (GER)	398	21	105
6	7	Matthias Bachinger (GER)	391	13	109
7		Denis Istomin (UZB)	385	4	
8		Adrian Ungur (ROU)	385	20	
9	4	Dudi Sela (ISR)	380	8	95
10		Stéphane Robert (FRA)	380	19	
11	8	Bobby Reynolds (USA)	376	13	121
12	5	Cedrik-Marcel Stebe (GER)	361	13	103
WC	1	Thomaz Bellucci (BRA)	0	0	37
^{1} ATP Year-To-Date Challenger Rankings as of October 24, 2011.^{2} Seedings were determined according to the ATP Singles Rankings as of November 14, 2011.
^{1} ATP Year-To-Date Challenger Rankings as of October 24, 2011.^{2} Seedings were determined according to the ATP Singles Rankings as of November 14, 2011.			Key		
^{1} ATP Year-To-Date Challenger Rankings as of October 24, 2011.^{2} Seedings were determined according to the ATP Singles Rankings as of November 14, 2011.			Qualified		
^{1} ATP Year-To-Date Challenger Rankings as of October 24, 2011.^{2} Seedings were determined according to the ATP Singles Rankings as of November 14, 2011.			Wildcard Awardee		
^{1} ATP Year-To-Date Challenger Rankings as of October 24, 2011.^{2} Seedings were determined according to the ATP Singles Rankings as of November 14, 2011.			Declined Participation		

The top seven players with the most points accumulated in ATP Challenger tournaments during the year plus one wild card entrant from the host country qualified for the 2011 ATP Challenger Tour Finals. However, points for qualification were only countable to a maximum of ten ATP Challenger tournaments. The tournament line-up was announced on 26 October 2011, based on the 2011 ATP Year-To-Date Challenger Rankings up to that date.

Rui Machado, Martin Kližan, Andreas Beck and Matthias Bachinger qualified directly to the tournament, whereas Dudi Sela, Bobby Reynolds and Cedrik-Marcel Stebe were given their berths after Éric Prodon, Lukáš Rosol, Denis Istomin, Adrian Ungur and Stéphane Robert chose not to participate. Thomaz Bellucci, the Brazilian No. 1, was given the wildcard entry to the tournament.

Rui Machado, qualified as the leader of the ATP Challenger Tour ranking. He won 4 ATP Challenger Tour titles in Marrakech, Rijeka, Poznań and Szczecin. He was also a semifinalist at Trani, Madrid, São Leopoldo and São José do Rio Preto. His ATP Challenger Tour results throughout the 2011 season have earned him a career-high ranking of World No. 59, the highest achieved by a Portuguese player up to that date.

Martin Kližan has won a Challenger title in Genoa. He has also finished as runner-up in Rome and San Marino and reached the semifinals in Manerbio, Cordeons, Zagreb and Rabat. At the time of the tournament, he was the Slovakian No. 2.

Andreas Beck, German No. 6 and former World No. 33, did not win any ATP Challenger tournament in the 2011 season. However, he was still able to qualify with runner-up appearances at Kazan, Bath, Como and Oberstaufen. He also reached the semi-finals in Monza, Rome, Eckental, Palermo, Naples and Orléans.

Mathias Bachinger was another of the 3 German players who qualified for the ATP Challenger Tour Finals. During the 2011 season, he won the Athens title, was runner-up in Pingguo, Nottingham and Granby, and reached the semifinals at Courmayuer and Guangzhou. At the time of the tournament, he was the German No. 8.

Dudi Sela, Israeli No. 1 and former World No. 29 was active in both the ATP World Tour and the ATP Challenger Tour. In the latter, he won titles in Fergana, Busan and Nottingham and reached the semifinals at Athens and Beijing.

Bobby Reynolds has earned a place in the tournament following his 2 titles in Leon and Tulsa, runner-up showings in Rimouski and Winnetka, plus semi-final efforts in Tallahassee and Vancouver. He entered the tournament as the United States No. 11.

Cedrik-Marcel Stebe completed the line-up of seven qualified players and appeared in the tournament shortly after attaining career-high ranks of World No. 99 and German No. 5. In the 2011 season, he has reached three finals, winning the titles an Bangkok and Shanghai and finishing runner-up in Kyoto. He also reached the semifinals in Guangzhou, Pingguo, Oberstaufen and Ningbo.

Thomaz Bellucci did not compete in any events of ATP Challenger Tour throughout the 2011 season. Still, he was present at the ATP Challenger Tour Finals after being awarded the wildcard entry reserved to a player from the host country.

== Groupings ==
The draw took place on November 14, 2011. The top seed was placed in the Green Group and the second seed was placed in the Yellow Group. Players seeded three and four, five and six, seven and eight, were then drawn in pairs and divided into the two groups.

Green Group: Thomaz Bellucci [1], Martin Kližan [3], Andreas Beck [6], Bobby Reynolds [8].

Yellow Group: Rui Machado [2], Dudi Sela [4], Cedrik-Marcel Stebe [5], Matthias Bachinger [7].

== Player head-to-heads ==
These were the head-to-head records between the qualified players, immediately before the tournament.

		Machado	Kližan	Beck	Bachinger	Sela	Reynolds	Stebe	Bellucci	Overall
1	(Portugal) Rui Machado		1–1	0–0	0–0	0–0	0–0	0–0	0–1	1–2
2	(Slovakia) Martin Kližan	1–1		0–0	0–0	0–0	0–0	0–0	0–0	1–1
3	(Germany) Andreas Beck	0–0	0–0		0–1	0–1	0–0	0–0	0–2	0–4
4	(Germany) Matthias Bachinger	0–0	0–0	1–0		0–0	1–0	0–0	0–0	2–0
5	(Israel) Dudi Sela	0–0	0–0	1–0	0–0		3–2	0–0	1–0	5–2
6	(United States) Bobby Reynolds	0–0	0–0	0–0	0–1	2–3		0–0	0–0	2–4
7	(Germany) Cedrik-Marcel Stebe	0–0	0–0	0–0	0–0	0–0	0–0		0–0	0–0
8	(Brazil) Thomaz Bellucci	1–0	0–0	2–0	0–0	0–1	0–0	0–0		3–1

== Day-by-day summaries ==
=== Day 1: November 16, 2011 ===
Matches
Group	Winner	Loser	Score
Yellow Group	(Israel) Dudi Sela [4]	(Germany) Cedrik-Marcel Stebe [5]	6–4, 7–6^{(7–3)}
Yellow Group	(Portugal) Rui Machado [2]	(Germany) Matthias Bachinger [7]	3–6, 7–6^{(7–4)}, 6–4
Green Group	(Germany) Andreas Beck [6]	(Slovakia) Martin Kližan [3]	6–3, 6–1
Green Group	(Brazil) Thomaz Bellucci [1]	(United States) Bobby Reynolds [8]	6–3, 6–3

=== Day 2: November 17, 2011 ===
Matches
Group	Winner	Loser	Score
Yellow Group	(Germany) Cedrik-Marcel Stebe [5]	(Germany) Matthias Bachinger [7]	6–4, 2–6, 6–4
Yellow Group	(Portugal) Rui Machado [2]	(Israel) Dudi Sela [4]	6–2, 6–2
Green Group	(United States) Bobby Reynolds [8]	(Slovakia) Martin Kližan [3]	6–2, 3–6, 6–1
Green Group	(Germany) Andreas Beck [6]	(Brazil) Thomaz Bellucci [1]	6–4, 4–6, 6–4

=== Day 3: November 18, 2011 ===
Matches
Group	Winner	Loser	Score
Yellow Group	(Israel) Dudi Sela [4]	(Germany) Matthias Bachinger [7]	6–2, 6–2
Yellow Group	(Germany) Cedrik-Marcel Stebe [5]	(Portugal) Rui Machado [2]	7–5, 6–0
Green Group	(Brazil) Thomaz Bellucci [1]	(Slovakia) Martin Kližan [3]	3–6, 6–4, 7–6^{(9–7)}
Green Group	(Germany) Andreas Beck [6]	(United States) Bobby Reynolds [8]	6–3, 7–5

=== Day 4: November 19, 2011 ===
Matches
Group	Winner	Loser	Score
Semifinals	(Israel) Dudi Sela [4]	(Brazil) Thomaz Bellucci [1]	6–4, 6–4
Semifinals	(Germany) Cedrik-Marcel Stebe [5]	(Germany) Andreas Beck [6]	5–7, 7–6^{(7–3)}, 7–6^{(7–4)}

=== Day 5: November 20, 2011 ===
Matches
Group	Winner	Loser	Score
Final	(Germany) Cedrik-Marcel Stebe [5]	(Israel) Dudi Sela [4]	6–2, 6–4

== Points and prize money ==
The total prize money for the 2011 ATP Challenger Tour Finals was US$220,000.

Stage	Prize Money	Points
Undefeated Champion	$91,200	125
Final win	$45,000	50
Semifinal win	$21,000	30
Round robin win per match	$6,300	15
Participation	$6,300	–
Alternates	$3,500	–

== Champion ==
(Germany) Cedrik-Marcel Stebe def. (Israel) Dudi Sela, 6–2, 6–4

== See also ==
- 2011 ATP World Tour Finals
- 2011 WTA Tour Championships
