= Cedrik-Marcel Stebe =

German tennis player (born 1990)

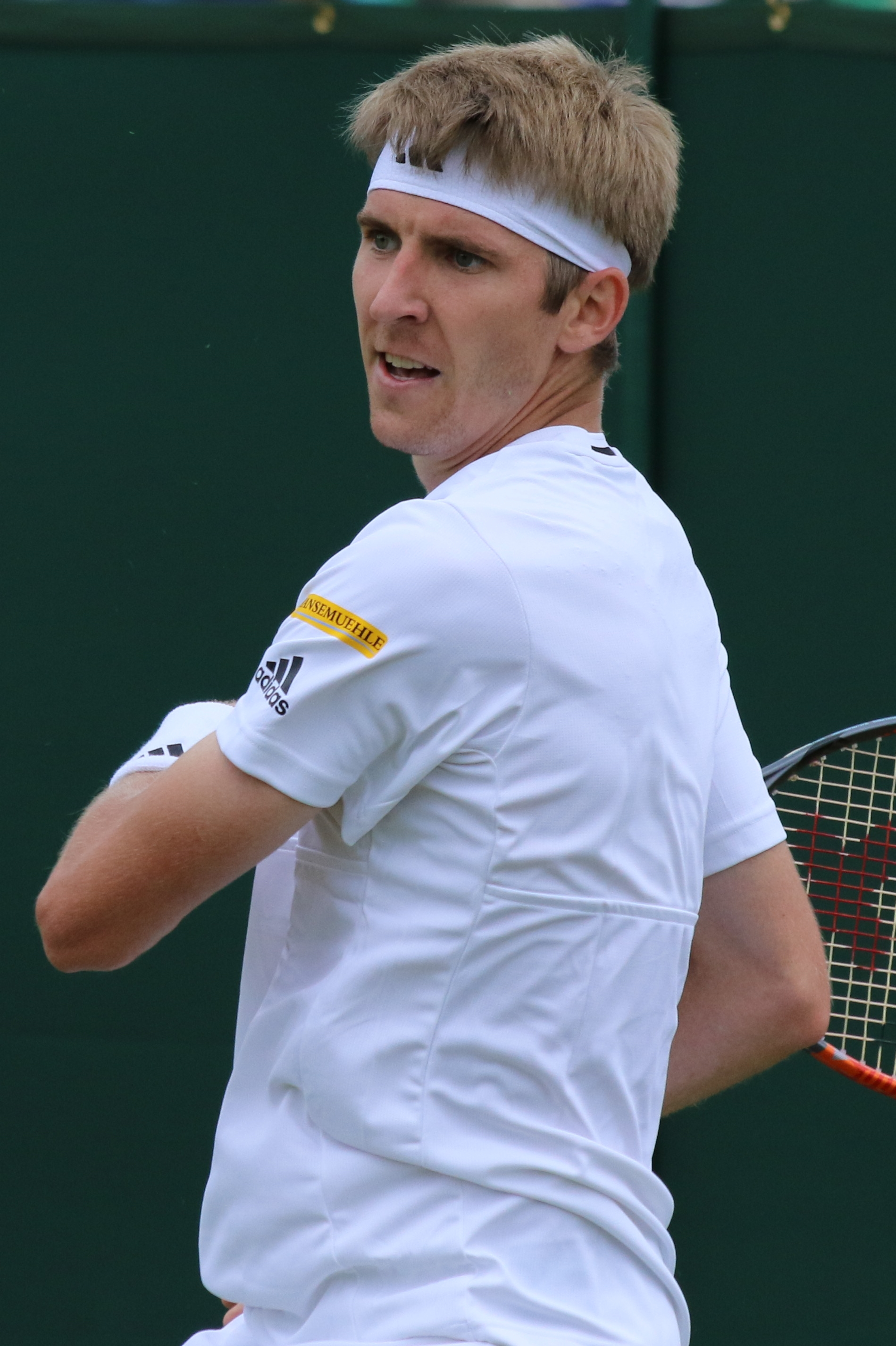
- Country (sports): Germany
- Residence: Vaihingen an der Enz, Germany
- Born: 9 October 1990 (age 35) Mühlacker, Germany
- Height: 1.80 m (5 ft 11 in)
- Turned pro: 2010
- Retired: 2025
- Plays: Left-handed (two-handed backhand)
- Prize money: US $1,619,228

Singles
- Career record: 32–50
- Career titles: 0
- Highest ranking: No. 71 (13 February 2012)

Grand Slam singles results
- Australian Open: 1R (2012, 2013, 2018, 2020, 2021)
- French Open: 2R (2012)
- Wimbledon: 1R (2011, 2012, 2019)
- US Open: 2R (2012, 2017, 2019)

Doubles
- Career record: 2–8
- Career titles: 0
- Highest ranking: No. 376 (9 July 2012)

Grand Slam doubles results
- Australian Open: 1R (2012)
- French Open: 1R (2012)
- Wimbledon: 2R (2012)

Team competitions
- Davis Cup: 1R (2012)
- Last updated on: 1 July 2026.

Cedrik-Marcel Stebe (German pronunciation: [ˌtseːdʁɪk ˌmaʁsɛl ˈʃteːbə]; born 9 October 1990) is a German inactive professional tennis player. He reached his career-high singles ranking of world No. 71 in February 2012.

== Career ==
=== 2011: Grand Slam and Top 100 debuts ===
He reached his first ATP World Tour quarterfinal at the 2011 MercedesCup in Stuttgart, Germany, where he beat Nikolay Davydenko and Fabio Fognini.

He was then awarded a wildcard to the 2011 International German Open where he beat Juan Carlos Ferrero and Davydenko again, before losing to Fernando Verdasco.

Stebe finished the year by winning the 2011 ATP Challenger Tour Finals.

=== 2012: First and second Grand Slam wins ===
Stebe recorded his best Grand Slam result, when he got to the second round in the 2012 French Open. He reached the same stage at the 2012 US Open (tennis).

At the 2012 Davis Cup World Group play-offs he won the deciding rubber against former world No. 1 Lleyton Hewitt in straight sets.

=== 2013–2014: Injury and hiatus ===
Stebe suffered a hip injury during the Heilbronn Open, and underwent surgery in October 2013. He expressed wishes to play competitive tennis again, but struggled with the recovery process.

=== 2015–2016: Back to the ITF Tour ===
In February 2015, he played his first tournament in almost a year and half, a Futures in Antalya, Turkey. He won his three qualifying matches and managed to enter the main draw. He would win two more matches before losing in the quarterfinals to Dimitar Kuzmanov.

=== 2017: Return to ATP Tour and top 100 ===
At the Sofia Open, Stebe won his first ATP Tour match in over three and a half years by beating Teymuraz Gabashvili in the first round.

He won in the first round in 2017 Geneva Open against Jan-Lennard Struff as a lucky loser. He reached the quarterfinals, after the retirement of wildcard Janko Tipsarević in the second round, where he lost to Andrey Kuznetsov.

In June, Stebe won his first title in four years at the Poprad Tatry Challenger in Slovakia. He finished the year ranked inside the top 100 at World No. 82.

=== 2019–2020: First ATP final ===
Stebe reached his first ATP Tour final at the 2019 Swiss Open Gstaad, but lost to Albert Ramos Viñolas.

In November 2020, Stebe won his eight challenger title in Parma, his first since 2017 at the Sibiu Open.

=== 2022: First ATP match win in over a year ===
He qualified at the 2022 inaugural edition of the Dallas Open and won his first ATP main draw match in over a year against American Denis Kudla in three sets.

He claimed his first Challenger title since November 2020, and ninth overall, in Como, Italy defeating Francesco Passaro.

== Singles performance timeline ==
Key
W	F	SF	QF	#R	RR	Q#	P#	DNQ	A	Z#	PO	G	S	B	NMS	NTI	P	NH

(W) winner; (F) finalist; (SF) semifinalist; (QF) quarterfinalist; (#R) rounds 4, 3, 2, 1; (RR) round-robin stage; (Q#) qualification round; (P#) preliminary round; (DNQ) did not qualify; (A) absent; (Z#) Davis/Fed Cup Zonal Group (with number indication) or (PO) play-off; (G) gold, (S) silver or (B) bronze Olympic/Paralympic medal; (NMS) not a Masters tournament; (NTI) not a Tier I tournament; (P) postponed; (NH) not held; (SR) strike rate (events won / competed); (W–L) win–loss record.
To avoid confusion and double counting, these charts are updated at the conclusion of a tournament or when the player's participation has ended.

Tournament	2011	2012	2013	…	2016	2017	2018	2019	2020	2021	2022	…	2025	SR	W–L
Grand Slam tournaments
Australian Open	A	1R	1R	A	A	Q1	1R	A	1R	1R	A	Q1	A	0 / 5	0–5
French Open	Q2	2R	Q2	A	Q1	A	A	1R	Q1	Q1	Q3	A	A	0 / 2	1–2
Wimbledon	1R	1R	Q2	A	Q1	A	A	1R	NH	Q1	Q2	A	A	0 / 3	0–3
US Open	Q1	2R	Q1	A	Q1	2R	A	2R	A	Q1	A	A	A	0 / 3	3–3
Win–loss	0–1	2–4	0–1	0–0	0–0	1–1	0–1	1–3	0–1	0–1	0–0	0–0	0–0	0 / 13	4–13
National representation
Davis Cup	A	1R	A	A	A	PO	A	A	A	A	A	A	A	0 / 1	3–1
ATP 1000 tournaments
Indian Wells Open	A	1R	A	A	A	A	A	A	NH	A	A	A	A	0 / 1	0–1
Miami Open	A	2R	A	A	A	A	A	A	NH	Q1	Q1	A	A	0 / 1	1–1
Career statistics
Tournaments	4	15	3	0	1	6	2	10	3	4	1	0	0	49	
Titles / Finals	0 / 0	0 / 0	0 / 0	0 / 0	0 / 0	0 / 0	0 / 0	0 / 1	0 / 0	0 / 0	0 / 0	0 / 0	0 / 0	0 / 1	
Overall win–loss	4–4	9–16	2–3	0–0	0–1	6–6	0–2	7–10	2–3	1–4	1–1	0–0	0–0	32–50	
Year-end ranking	81	177	167	–	463	82	507	165	126	227	203	–	347	39%	

== ATP Tour finals ==
=== Singles: 1 (1 runner-up) ===
Legend Grand Slam (0–0) ATP Finals (0–0) ATP 1000 (0–0) ATP 500 (0–0) ATP 250 (0–1)	Finals by surface Hard (0–0) Clay (0–1)

Result	W–L	Date	Tournament	Tier	Surface	Opponent	Score
Loss	0–1	Jul 2019	Swiss Open Gstaad, Switzerland	ATP 250	Clay	(Spain) Albert Ramos Viñolas	3–6, 2–6

== ATP Challenger finals ==
=== Singles: 14 (10 titles, 4 runner-ups) ===
ATP Challenger Finals (1–0)
ATP Challenger (9–4)

Result	W–L	Date	Tournament	Surface	Opponent	Score
Loss	0–1	Jul 2010	Oberstaufen, Germany	Clay	(Austria) Martin Fischer	3–6, 4–6
Loss	0–2	Mar 2011	Kyoto, Japan	Carpet (i)	(Germany) Dominik Meffert	6–4, 4–6, 2–6
Win	1–2	Sep 2011	Bangkok, Thailand	Hard	(Israel) Amir Weintraub	7–5, 6–1
Win	2–2	Sep 2011	Shanghai, China	Hard	(Russia) Alexandre Kudryavtsev	6–4, 4–6, 7–5
Win	3–2	Nov 2011	São Paulo, Brazil	Hard (i)	(Israel) Dudi Sela	6–2, 6–4
Loss	3–3	May 2013	Tallahassee, United States	Clay	(United States) Denis Kudla	3–6, 3–6
Win	4–3	Sep 2013	Meknes, Morocco	Clay	(Belgium) Yannik Reuter	6–1, 4–6, 6–2
Win	5–3	Jun 2017	Poprad, Slovakia	Clay	(Serbia) Laslo Djere	6–0, 6–3
Loss	5–4	Jul 2017	Marburg, Germany	Clay	(Serbia) Filip Krajinović	2–6, 3–6
Win	6–4	Aug 2017	Vancouver, Canada	Hard	(Australia) Jordan Thompson	6–0, 6–1
Win	7–4	Sep 2017	Sibiu, Romania	Clay	(Spain) Carlos Taberner	6–3, 6–3
Win	8–4	Nov 2020	Parma, Italy	Hard (i)	(United Kingdom) Liam Broady	6–4, 6–4
Win	9–4	Sep 2022	Como, Italy	Clay	(Italy) Francesco Passaro	7–6^{(7–2)}, 6–4
Win	10–4	Aug 2025	Augsburg, Germany	Clay	(Switzerland) Alexander Ritschard	6–3, 6–3

== ITF finals ==
=== Singles: 6 (4 titles, 2 runner-ups) ===
Result	W–L	Date	Tournament	Surface	Opponent	Score
Loss	0–1	Mar 2009	Spain F11, Zaragoza	Clay (i)	(Spain) Gabriel Trujillo Soler	3–6, 2–6
Loss	0–2	Aug 2009	Germany F12, Dortmund	Clay	(Spain) Adrián Menéndez-Maceiras	5–7, 1–6
Win	1–2	May 2010	Italy F5, Padova	Clay	(Italy) Daniele Giorgini	4–6, 6–1, 6–2
Win	2–2	Feb 2011	Turkey F5, Antalya	Hard	(Ukraine) Denys Molchanov	6–4, 6–3
Win	3–2	Feb 2011	Turkey F6, Antalya	Hard	(Belgium) Yannik Reuter	6–1, 6–0
Win	4–2	Jun 2025	M15 Kamen, Germany	Clay	(Czech Republic) Jakub Nicod	3–6, 6–4, 5–3 ret.

=== Doubles: 3 (2 titles, 1 runner-up) ===
Result	W–L	Date	Tournament	Surface	Partner	Opponents	Score
Loss	0–1	Mar 2009	Spain F8, Sabadell	Clay	(Spain) Roberto Bautista Agut	(Spain) Sergio Gutiérrez Ferrol (Netherlands) Boy Westerhof	2–6, 4–6
Win	1–1	Mar 2010	Croatia F2, Rovinj	Clay	(Croatia) Marin Draganja	(Croatia) Toni Androić (Croatia) Nikola Mektić	1–6, 6–2, [10–3]
Win	2–1	Apr 2010	Croatia F3, Rovinj	Clay	(Croatia) Marin Draganja	(Spain) Óscar Burrieza (Spain) Javier Martí	6–4, 3–6, [10–7]

== Junior Grand Slam finals ==
=== Doubles: 1 (1 title) ===
Result	Year	Tournament	Surface	Partner	Opponent	Score
Win	2008	US Open	Hard	(Austria) Nikolaus Moser	(Thailand) Peerakit Siributwong (Thailand) Kittipong Wachiramanowong	7–6^{(7–5)}, 3–6, [10–8]

== National participation ==
=== Davis Cup (3–1) ===
Group membership World Group (1–0) WG Play-off (2–1)	Matches by type Singles (3–1) Doubles (0–0)	Matches by surface Hard (0–0) Clay (3–1)	Matches by venue Germany (2–1) Away (1–0)

Date	Venue	Surface	Rd	Opponent nation	Score	Match	Opponent player	W/L	Rubber score
2012
Feb 2012	Bamberg	Clay (i)	1R	Argentina	1–4	Singles 5 (dead)	Eduardo Schwank	Win	7–6^{(7–1)}, 7–5
Sep 2012	Hamburg	Clay	PO	Australia	3–2	Singles 1	Bernard Tomic	Loss	6–2, 3–6, 4–6, 6–7^{(4–7)}
Sep 2012	Hamburg	Clay	PO	Australia	3–2	Singles 5 (decider)	Lleyton Hewitt	Win	6–4, 6–1, 6–4
2017
Sep 2017	Oeiras	Clay	PO	Portugal	3–2	Singles 1	João Sousa	Win	4–6, 6–3, 6–3, 6–0
