= Internazionali di Tennis Città di Parma =

ATP Challenger Tour
- Event name: Internazionali di Tennis Città di Parma
- Location: Parma, Italy
- Category: ATP Challenger Tour
- Surface: Hard (indoor)

The Internazionali di Tennis Città di Parma is a professional tennis tournament played on indoor hard courts. It is part of the Association of Tennis Professionals (ATP) Challenger Tour. It is held in Parma, Italy.

== Past finals ==
=== Singles ===
Year	Champion	Runner-up	Score
2020	(Germany) Cedrik-Marcel Stebe	(United Kingdom) Liam Broady	6–4, 6–4

=== Doubles ===
Year	Champions	Runners-up	Score
2020	(France) Grégoire Barrère (France) Albano Olivetti	(France) Sadio Doumbia (France) Fabien Reboul	6–2, 6–4

== See also ==
- Emilia-Romagna Open
- Parma Challenger
