= ATP Challenger Tour Finals =

Defunct tennis tournament
- Location: São Paulo; Brazil (2011–2015)
- Venue: Esporte Clube Pinheiros
- Category: Challenger Tour Finals
- Surface: Hard court (indoors) (2011–2012); Clay court (outdoors) (2013); Clay court (indoors) (2014–2015)
- Draw: 8S
- Prize money: US$220,000
- Website: Website

The ATP Challenger Tour Finals was a tennis tournament played between 2011 and 2015 at the end of season, involving the top seven players in that year's ATP Challenger Tour, plus an invited player from the tournament's host country.

Like the ATP Finals, the ATP Challenger Tour Finals was not a straightforward knockout tournament. Eight players were divided into two groups of four, and played three round-robin matches each against the other three players in their group. From there, the two players with the best records in each group progressed to the semifinals, with the winners meeting in the final to determine the champion.

== Venues ==
Location	Years	Surface	Stadium	Capacity
(Brazil) São Paulo	2011–2012	Indoor hard	Ginásio do Ibirapuera	11,000
(Brazil) São Paulo	2013	Outdoor clay	Sociedade Harmonia de Tênis	
(Brazil) São Paulo	2014–2015	Indoor clay	Esporte Clube Pinheiros	1,000

== Finals ==
Location	Surface	Year	Champion	Runner-up	Score
São Paulo, Brazil	Indoor hard	2011	(Germany) Cedrik-Marcel Stebe	(Israel) Dudi Sela	6–2, 6–4
São Paulo, Brazil	Indoor hard	2012	(Argentina) Guido Pella	(Romania) Adrian Ungur	6–3, 6–7^{(4–7)}, 7–6^{(7–4)}
São Paulo, Brazil	Outdoor clay	2013	(Italy) Filippo Volandri	(Colombia) Alejandro González	4–6, 6–4, 6–2
São Paulo, Brazil	Indoor clay	2014	(Argentina) Diego Schwartzman	(Brazil) Guilherme Clezar	6–2, 6–3
São Paulo, Brazil	Indoor clay	2015	(Spain) Íñigo Cervantes	(Spain) Daniel Muñoz de la Nava	6–2, 3–6, 7–6^{(7–4)}

== See also ==
- ATP Finals
- WTA Tour Championships
- WCT Finals
- WCT World Doubles
- World Championship Tennis
- Grand Prix tennis circuit
