= Holger Rune career statistics =

Career finals
Discipline	Type	Won	Lost	Total
Singles	Grand Slam	–	–	–
Singles	ATP Finals	–	–	–
Singles	ATP 1000	1	3	4
Singles	ATP 500	1	1	1
Singles	ATP 250	3	2	5
Singles	Olympics	–	–	–
Singles	Total	5	6	11

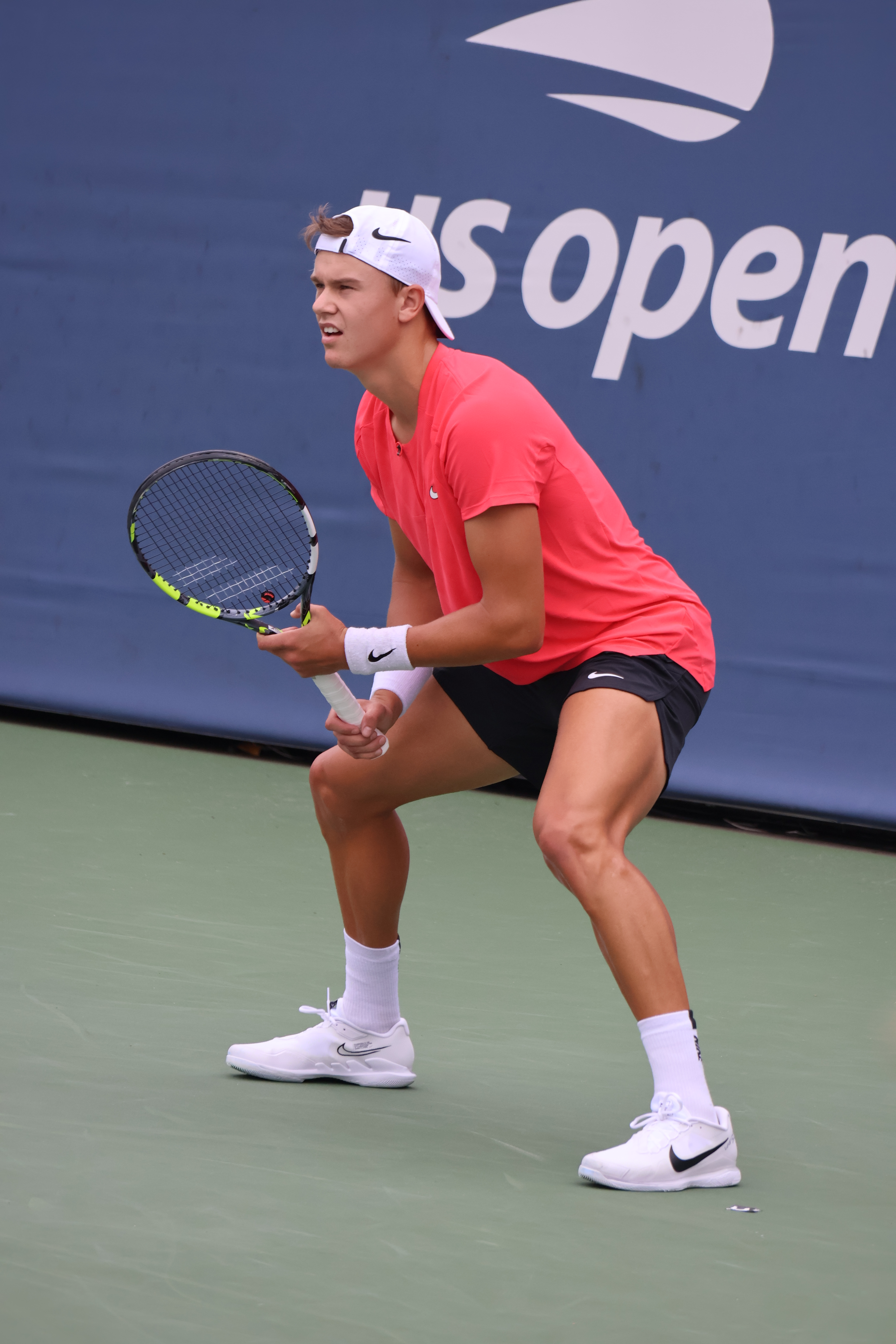
Rune at the 2023 US Open

This is a list of main career statistics of Danish professional tennis player Holger Rune.

== Performance timeline ==
Key
W	F	SF	QF	#R	RR	Q#	P#	DNQ	A	Z#	PO	G	S	B	NMS	NTI	P	NH

(W) winner; (F) finalist; (SF) semifinalist; (QF) quarterfinalist; (#R) rounds 4, 3, 2, 1; (RR) round-robin stage; (Q#) qualification round; (P#) preliminary round; (DNQ) did not qualify; (A) absent; (Z#) Davis/Fed Cup Zonal Group (with number indication) or (PO) play-off; (G) gold, (S) silver or (B) bronze Olympic/Paralympic medal; (NMS) not a Masters tournament; (NTI) not a Tier I tournament; (P) postponed; (NH) not held; (SR) strike rate (events won / competed); (W–L) win–loss record.
To avoid confusion and double counting, these charts are updated at the conclusion of a tournament or when the player's participation has ended.

=== Singles ===
Tournament	2018	2019	2020	2021	2022	2023	2024	2025	2026	SR	W–L	Win %
Grand Slam tournaments
Australian Open	A	A	A	A	1R	4R	2R	4R	A	0 / 4	7–4	64%
French Open	A	A	A	A	QF	QF (Note: Rune's second round opponent, Gaël Monfils, withdrew before the second round of the 2023 French Open, which does not officially count as a win.)	4R	4R	A	0 / 4	13–4	76%
Wimbledon	A	A	NH	A	1R	QF	4R	1R	A	0 / 4	7–4	64%
US Open	A	A	A	1R	3R (Note: Rune's second round opponent, John Isner, withdrew before the second round of the 2022 US Open, which does not officially count as a win.)	1R	1R	2R	A	0 / 5	2–5	29%
Win–loss	0–0	0–0	0–0	0–1	5–4	10–4	7–4	7–4	0–0	0 / 17	29–17	63%
Year-end championship
ATP Finals	DNQ				Alt	RR	DNQ			0 / 1	1–2	33%
National representation
Davis Cup	Z2	Z2	Z2	A	A	WG1	A	2R	WG1	0 / 1	10–4	71%
ATP 1000 tournaments
Indian Wells Open	A	A	NH	1R	2R	3R	QF (Note: Rune's second round opponent, Milos Raonic, withdrew before the second round of the 2024 BNP Paribas Open, which does not officially count as a win.)	F	A	0 / 5	9–5	64%
Miami Open	A	A	NH	A	Q1	4R	2R	2R	A	0 / 3	2–3	40%
Monte-Carlo Masters	A	A	NH	1R	2R	F (Note: Rune's third round opponent, Matteo Berrettini, withdrew before the third round of the 2023 Monte-Carlo Masters, which does not officially count as a win.)	QF	1R	A	0 / 5	6–5	55%
Madrid Open	A	A	NH	A	A	3R	3R	2R	A	0 / 3	2–3	40%
Italian Open	A	A	A	A	Q1	F	3R	3R	A	0 / 3	7–3	70%
Canadian Open	A	A	NH	A	2R	2R	3R	4R	A	0 / 4	5–4	56%
Cincinnati Open	A	A	A	A	1R	2R	SF	QF	A	0 / 4	7-4	64%
Shanghai Masters	A	A	NH			2R	4R	QF	1R	0 / 4	5–4	56%
Paris Masters	A	A	A	A	W	QF	SF	A	1R	1 / 4	12–3	80%
Win–loss	0–0	0–0	0–0	0–2	9–4	14–9	18–9	14–8	0–2	1 / 35	55–34	62%
Career statistics
	2018	2019	2020	2021	2022	2023	2024	2025	2026	Career		
Tournaments	0	0	0	11	27	23	23	20	2	Career total: 104		
Titles	0	0	0	0	3	1	0	1	0	Career total: 5		
Finals	0	0	0	0	5	3	1	2	0	Career total: 11		
Overall win–loss	1–0	1–1	2–0	7–13	39–24	44–24	45–23	36–22	2–2	5 / 104	177–109	62%
Win %	100%	50%	100%	35%	62%	65%	66%	62%	50%	Career total: 62%		
Year-end ranking	–	1019	473	103	11	8	13	15		$15,744,055		

=== Doubles ===
Tournament	2022	2023	2024	2025	SR	W–L	Win %
Grand Slam tournaments
Australian Open	A	A	A	A	0 / 0	0–0	–
French Open	A	A	A	A	0 / 0	0–0	–
Wimbledon	A	A	A	A	0 / 0	0–0	–
US Open	2R	A	A	A	0 / 1	1–1	50%
Win–loss	1–1	0–0	0–0	0–0	0 / 1	1–1	50%
ATP 1000 tournaments
Indian Wells Open	A	1R	A	A	0 / 1	0–1	0%
Monte-Carlo Masters	A	QF	QF	A	0 / 2	4–1	80%
Cincinnati Open	SF	A	1R	A	0 / 2	3–1	75%
Win–loss	3–0	2–1	2–2	0–0	0 / 5	7–3	70%
Career statistics
Tournaments	4	2	3	1	Career total: 10		
Win–Loss	7–3	3–1	2–3	1–2	0 / 10	13–9	59%
Year-end ranking	191	580	332	346			

== ATP 1000 tournaments ==
=== Singles: 4 (1 title, 3 runner-ups) ===
Result	Year	Tournament	Surface	Opponent	Score	Ref
Win	2022	Paris Masters	Hard (i)	(Serbia) Novak Djokovic	3–6, 6–3, 7–5	
Loss	2023	Monte-Carlo Masters	Clay	Andrey Rublev	7–5, 2–6, 5–7	
Loss	2023	Italian Open	Clay	Daniil Medvedev	5–7, 5–7	
Loss	2025	Indian Wells Open	Hard	(United Kingdom) Jack Draper	2–6, 2–6	

== ATP Tour finals ==
=== Singles: 11 (5 titles, 6 runner-ups) ===
Legend ATP 1000 (1–3) ATP 500 (1–1) ATP 250 (3–2)	Finals by surface Hard (2–4) Clay (3–2)	Finals by setting Outdoor (3–4) Indoor (2–2)

Result	W–L	Date	Tournament	Tier	Surface	Opponent	Score
Win	1–0	Apr 2022	Bavarian Open, Germany	ATP 250	Clay	(Netherlands) Botic van de Zandschulp	3–4 ret.
Loss	1–1	Oct 2022	Sofia Open, Bulgaria	ATP 250	Hard (i)	(Switzerland) Marc-Andrea Hüsler	4–6, 6–7^{(8–10)}
Win	2–1	Oct 2022	Stockholm Open, Sweden	ATP 250	Hard (i)	(Greece) Stefanos Tsitsipas	6–4, 6–4
Loss	2–2	Oct 2022	Swiss Indoors, Switzerland	ATP 500	Hard (i)	(Canada) Félix Auger-Aliassime	3–6, 5–7
Win	3–2	Nov 2022	Paris Masters, France	ATP 1000	Hard (i)	(Serbia) Novak Djokovic	3–6, 6–3, 7–5
Loss	3–3	Apr 2023	Monte-Carlo Masters, France	ATP 1000	Clay	Andrey Rublev	7–5, 2–6, 5–7
Win	4–3	Apr 2023	Bavarian Open, Germany (2)	ATP 250	Clay	(Netherlands) Botic van de Zandschulp	6–4, 1–6, 7–6^{(7–3)}
Loss	4–4	May 2023	Italian Open, Italy	ATP 1000	Clay	Daniil Medvedev	5–7, 5–7
Loss	4–5	Jan 2024	Brisbane International, Australia	ATP 250	Hard	(Bulgaria) Grigor Dimitrov	6–7^{(5–7)}, 4–6
Loss	4–6	Mar 2025	Indian Wells Open, United States	ATP 1000	Hard	(United Kingdom) Jack Draper	2–6, 2–6
Win	5–6	Apr 2025	Barcelona Open, Spain	ATP 500	Clay	(Spain) Carlos Alcaraz	7–6^{(8–6)}, 6–2

== ATP Challenger Tour finals ==
=== Singles: 6 (5 titles, 1 runner-up) ===
Legend ATP Challenger Tour (5–1)	Finals by surface Hard (1–0) Clay (4–1)

Result	W–L	Date	Tournament	Tier	Surface	Opponent	Score
Loss	0–1	May 2021	Open de Oeiras IV, Portugal	Challenger	Clay	(Portugal) Gastão Elias	7–5, 4–6, 4–6
Win	1–1	Jun 2021	Biella Challenger, Italy	Challenger	Clay	(Argentina) Marco Trungelliti	6–3, 5–7, 7–6^{(7–5)}
Win	2–1	Aug 2021	San Marino Open, San Marino	Challenger	Clay	(Brazil) Orlando Luz	1–6, 6–2, 6–3
Win	3–1	Aug 2021	Verona International, Italy	Challenger	Clay	(Croatia) Nino Serdarušić	6–4, 6–2
Win	4–1	Nov 2021	Trofeo Faip–Perrel, Italy	Challenger	Hard (i)	(Turkey) Cem İlkel	7–5, 7–6^{(8–6)}
Win	5–1	Apr 2022	Sanremo Challenger, Italy	Challenger	Clay	(Italy) Francesco Passaro	6–1, 2–6, 6–4

== ITF World Tennis Tour finals ==
=== Singles: 7 (4 titles, 3 runner-ups) ===
Legend ITF WTT (4–3)	Finals by surface Hard (1–2) Clay (3–1)

Result	W–L	Date	Tournament	Tier	Surface	Opponent	Score
Win	1–0	Sep 2020	M25 Klosters, Switzerland	WTT	Clay	(Netherlands) Jesper de Jong	6–4, 6–2
Loss	1–1	Sep 2020	M15 Melilla, Spain	WTT	Clay	(Kazakhstan) Timofey Skatov	6–3, 0–6, 1–6
Win	2–1	Nov 2020	M15 Valldoreix, Spain	WTT	Clay	(Spain) Javier Barranco Cosano	7–6^{(7–0)}, 6–3
Win	3–1	Nov 2020	M15 Antalya, Turkey	WTT	Clay	(Austria) Filip Misolic	6–0, 4–0 ret.
Loss	3–2	Jan 2021	M15 Manacor, Spain	WTT	Hard	(France) Evan Furness	2–6, 7–5, 0–6
Win	4–2	Jan 2021	M15 Bressuire, France	WTT	Hard (i)	(France) Matteo Martineau	7–5, 4–6, 6–3
Loss	4–3	Feb 2021	M25 Villena, Spain	WTT	Hard	(Portugal) Gastão Elias	6–3, 2–6, 1–6

=== Doubles: 2 (1 title, 1 runner-up) ===
Legend ITF WTT (1–1)

Result	W–L	Date	Tournament	Tier	Surface	Partner	Opponents	Score
Win	1–0	Sep 2020	M15 Melilla, Spain	WTT	Clay	(France) Valentin Royer	(Spain) José Vidal Azorín (Netherlands) Max Houkes	7–5, 6–3
Loss	1–1	Nov 2020	M15 Valldoreix, Spain	WTT	Clay	(Ukraine) Eric Vanshelboim	(Spain) Pedro Vives Marcos (Jordan) Abedallah Shelbayh	5–7, 3–6

== Junior Grand Slam finals ==
=== Singles: 1 (1 title) ===
Result	Year	Tournament	Surface	Opponent	Score
Win	2019	French Open	Clay	(United States) Toby Kodat	6–3, 6–7^{(5–7)}, 6–0

== Exhibition matches ==
=== Singles ===
Result	Date	Tournament	Surface	Opponent	Score
Win	Jun 2023	Giorgio Armani Tennis Classic, London, United Kingdom	Grass	(United Kingdom) Andy Murray	6–4, 6–4
Loss	Dec 2023	Ultimate Tennis Showdown Finals, London, United Kingdom	Hard (i)	(United Kingdom) Jack Draper	14–12, 12–15, 10–13, 7–19
Win	Jun 2024	Giorgio Armani Tennis Classic, London, United Kingdom	Grass	Karen Khachanov	6–2, 6–4
Win	Jun 2024	Giorgio Armani Tennis Classic, London, United Kingdom	Grass	(United Kingdom) Cameron Norrie	3–6, 6–4, [10–5]
Loss	Oct 2024	6 Kings Slam, Riyadh, Saudi Arabia	Hard	(Spain) Carlos Alcaraz	4–6, 2–6
Loss	Dec 2024	Nordic Battle, Asker/Copenhagen, Norway/Denmark	Hard (i)	(Norway) Casper Ruud	6–4, 4–6, [7–10]
Win	Dec 2024	Nordic Battle, Asker/Copenhagen, Norway/Denmark	Hard (i)	(Norway) Casper Ruud	6–4, 6–2
Win	Dec 2024	Nordic Battle, Asker/Copenhagen, Norway/Denmark	Hard (i)	(Norway) Casper Ruud	10–6

== Career Grand Slam statistics ==
=== Career Grand Slam seedings ===
Unseeded or seeded 32–11
Seeded 10–4
Seeded no. 3
Seeded no. 2
Seeded no. 1

Year	Australian Open	French Open	Wimbledon	US Open
2020	Did not play	Did not play	tournament cancelled (Note: Due to the COVID-19 pandemic, the 2020 edition of the Wimbledon Championships was cancelled.)	Did not play
2021	Did not play	Did not play	Did not play	Not seeded
2022	Not seeded	Not seeded	24th	28th
2023	9th	6th	6th	4th
2024	8th	13th	15th	15th
2025	13th	10th	8th	11th
2026	Did not play	Did not play	Did not play	Did not play

=== Best Grand Slam results details ===
Winners of the listed Grand Slam tournament are in boldface, and runner-ups are in italics.

Australian Open
2023 Australian Open (9th seed)
Round	Opponent	Rank	Score
1R	(Serbia) Filip Krajinović	54	6–2, 6–3, 6–4
2R	(United States) Maxime Cressy	41	7–5, 6–4, 6–4
3R	(France) Ugo Humbert	106	6–4, 6–2, 7–6^{(7–5)}
4R	Andrey Rublev (5)	5	3–6, 6–3, 3–6, 6–4, 6–7^{(9–11)}

French Open
2022 French Open (unseeded)
Round	Opponent	Rank	Score
1R	(Canada) Denis Shapovalov (14)	15	6–3, 6–1, 7–6^{(7–4)}
2R	(Switzerland) Henri Laaksonen	96	6–2, 6–3, 6–3
3R	(France) Hugo Gaston	74	6–3, 6–3, 6–3
4R	(Greece) Stefanos Tsitsipas (4)	4	7–5, 3–6, 6–3, 6–4
QF	(Norway) Casper Ruud (8)	8	1–6, 6–4, 6–7^{(2–7)}, 3–6
2023 French Open (6th seed)
Round	Opponent	Rank	Score
1R	(United States) Christopher Eubanks	74	6–4, 3–6, 7–6^{(7–2)}, 6–2
2R	(France) Gaël Monfils (PR)	394	Walkover
3R	(Argentina) Genaro Alberto Olivieri (Q)	231	6–4, 6–1, 6–3
4R	(Argentina) Francisco Cerúndolo (23)	23	7–6^{(7–3)}, 3–6, 6–4, 1–6, 7–6^{(10–7)}
QF	(Norway) Casper Ruud (4)	4	1–6, 2–6, 6–3, 3–6

Wimbledon Championships
2023 Wimbledon (6th seed)
Round	Opponent	Rank	Score
1R	(United Kingdom) George Loffhagen (WC)	371	7–6^{(7–4)}, 6–3, 6–2
2R	(Spain) Roberto Carballés Baena	57	6–3, 7–6^{(7–3)}, 6–4
3R	(Spain) Alejandro Davidovich Fokina (31)	34	6–3, 3–6, 4–6, 6–4, 7–6^{(10–8)}
4R	(Bulgaria) Grigor Dimitrov (21)	21	3–6, 7–6^{(8–6)}, 7–6^{(7–4)}, 6–3
QF	**(Spain) Carlos Alcaraz** (1)	**1**	6–7^{(3–7)}, 4–6, 4–6

US Open
2022 US Open (28th seed)
Round	Opponent	Rank	Score
1R	(Germany) Peter Gojowczyk	108	6–2, 6–4, 7–6^{(7–5)}
2R	(United States) John Isner	48	Walkover
3R	(United Kingdom) Cameron Norrie (7)	9	5–7, 4–6, 1–6

== Wins over top 10 players ==
- Rune has a 20–24 record against players who were, at the time the match was played, ranked in the top 10.

Season	2022	2023	2024	2025	2026	Total
Wins	9	5	2	4	0	20

#	Player	Rk	Event	Surface	Rd	Score	Rk	Ref
2022
1.	(Germany) Alexander Zverev	3	Bavarian Open, Germany	Clay	2R	6–3, 6–2	70	
2.	(Greece) Stefanos Tsitsipas	4	French Open, France	Clay	4R	7–5, 3–6, 6–3, 6–4	40	
3.	(Italy) Jannik Sinner	10	Sofia Open, Bulgaria	Hard (i)	SF	5–7, 6–4, 5–2 ret.	31	
4.	(Greece) Stefanos Tsitsipas	5	Stockholm Open, Sweden	Hard (i)	F	6–4, 6–4	27	
5.	(Poland) Hubert Hurkacz	10	Paris Masters, France	Hard (i)	2R	7–5, 6–1	18	
6.	Andrey Rublev	9	Paris Masters, France	Hard (i)	3R	6–4, 7–5	18	
7.	(Spain) Carlos Alcaraz	1	Paris Masters, France	Hard (i)	QF	6–3, 6–6 ret.	18	
8.	(Canada) Félix Auger-Aliassime	8	Paris Masters, France	Hard (i)	SF	6–4, 6–2	18	
9.	(Serbia) Novak Djokovic	7	Paris Masters, France	Hard (i)	F	3–6, 6–3, 7–5	18	
2023
10.	Daniil Medvedev	5	Monte-Carlo Masters, France	Clay	QF	6–3, 6–4	9	
11.	(Italy) Jannik Sinner	8	Monte-Carlo Masters, France	Clay	SF	1–6, 7–5, 7–5	9	
12.	(Serbia) Novak Djokovic	1	Italian Open, Italy	Clay	QF	6–2, 4–6, 6–2	7	
13.	(Norway) Casper Ruud	4	Italian Open, Italy	Clay	SF	6–7^{(2–7)}, 6–4, 6–2	7	
14.	(Greece) Stefanos Tsitsipas	6	ATP Finals, Italy	Hard (i)	RR	2–1 ret.	8	
2024
15.	(Bulgaria) Grigor Dimitrov	9	Monte-Carlo Masters, France	Clay	3R	7–6^{(11–9)}, 3–6, 7–6^{(7–2)}	7	
16.	(Australia) Alex de Minaur	10	Paris Masters, France	Hard (i)	QF	6–4, 4–6, 7–5	13	
2025
17.	(Greece) Stefanos Tsitsipas	9	Indian Wells Open, United States	Hard	4R	6–4, 6–4	13	
18.	Daniil Medvedev	6	Indian Wells Open, United States	Hard	SF	7–5, 6–4	13	
19.	(Norway) Casper Ruud	10	Barcelona Open, Spain	Clay	QF	6–4, 6–2	13	
20.	(Spain) Carlos Alcaraz	2	Barcelona Open, Spain	Clay	F	7–6^{(8–6)}, 6–2	13	

- Key: (Rk) first use, opponent rank; (Rd) round; (Rk) 2nd use, player rank; (Ref) reference; (F) final; (SF) semifinal; (QF) quarterfinal; (#R) rounds 4, 3, 2, 1; (RR) round-robin stage; (Q#) qualifying rounds or stages (3), 2, 1.

== ATP Tour career earnings ==
Year	Grand Slam titles	ATP titles	Total singles titles	Earnings ($)	Money list rank
2019	0	0	0	2,817	1382
2020	0	0	0	15,594	426
2021	0	0	0	362,172	135
2022	0	3	3	2,623,289	16
2023	0	1	1	4,946,875	8
2024	0	0	0	3,337,970	12
2025	0	1	1	3,340,029	15
2026	0	0	0	18,270	770
Career*	0	5	5	$15,744,055	56

* Statistics correct as of 5 October 2026.
