= 2022 Sofia Open – Doubles =

Doubles
- 2022 Sofia Open

Final
- Champions: (Brazil) Rafael Matos (Spain) David Vega Hernández
- Runners-up: (Germany) Fabian Fallert (Germany) Oscar Otte
- Score: 3–6, 7–5. [10–8]

Details
- Draw: 16
- Seeds: 4

Events
Singles	Doubles
- ATP Sofia Open

Rafael Matos and David Vega Hernández defeated Fabian Fallert and Oscar Otte in the final, 3–6, 7–5, [10–8] to win the doubles tennis title at the 2022 Sofia Open.

Jonny O'Mara and Ken Skupski were the reigning champions, but did not participate this year.

== Seeds ==
1. (Italy) Simone Bolelli / (Italy) Fabio Fognini (semifinals)
2. (Brazil) Rafael Matos / (Spain) David Vega Hernández (champions)
3. (Portugal) Francisco Cabral / (United Kingdom) Jamie Murray (first round)
4. (Monaco) Hugo Nys / (Poland) Jan Zieliński (semifinals)

== Draw ==
Key

- Q = Qualifier
- WC = Wild card
- LL = Lucky loser
- Alt = Alternate
- ITF = ITF entry
- PR = Protected ranking
- SR = Special ranking
- SE = Special exempt
- JE = Junior exempt
- JR = Junior Accelerator Programme entrant
- CO = College Accelerator Programme entrant
- NG = Next Gen Accelerator Program entrant
- w/o = Walkover
- r = Retired
- d = Defaulted

=== Draw ===
First round
1	(Italy) S Bolelli (Italy) F Fognini	6	5	[10]
(Switzerland) M-A Hüsler (Spain) B Zapata Miralles	3	7	[8]
(France) F Martin (Pakistan) A-u-H Qureshi	6	3	[8]
WC	(Bulgaria) A Donski (Bulgaria) A Lazarov	4	6	[10]
3	(Portugal) F Cabral (United Kingdom) J Murray	4	7^{7}	[6]
(Germany) F Fallert (Germany) O Otte	6	6^{5}	[10]
(Serbia) I Sabanov (Serbia) M Sabanov	7^{7}	6
(Czech Republic) R Jebavý (Czech Republic) A Pavlásek	6^{5}	4
(Netherlands) R Haase (Austria) P Oswald	3	6^{5}
(Kazakhstan) A Golubev (Kazakhstan) A Nedovyesov	6	7^{7}
(United States) H Reese (Poland) S Walków	2	6^{1}
4	(Monaco) H Nys (Poland) J Zieliński	6	7^{7}
WC	(Bulgaria) Y Milev (Bulgaria) P Nesterov	6	6
Alt	(United States) Jack Vance (United States) Jamie Vance	4	4
(Bosnia and Herzegovina) T Brkić (Ecuador) G Escobar	5	6^{3}
2	(Brazil) R Matos (Spain) D Vega Hernández	7	7^{7}

Quarterfinals
1	(Italy) S Bolelli (Italy) F Fognini	6	6
WC	(Bulgaria) A Donski (Bulgaria) A Lazarov	4	3
(Germany) F Fallert (Germany) O Otte	7^{7}	6
(Serbia) I Sabanov (Serbia) M Sabanov	6^{4}	3
(Kazakhstan) A Golubev (Kazakhstan) A Nedovyesov	1	5
4	(Monaco) H Nys (Poland) J Zieliński	6	7
WC	(Bulgaria) Y Milev (Bulgaria) P Nesterov	4	4
2	(Brazil) R Matos (Spain) D Vega Hernández	6	6

Semifinals
1	(Italy) S Bolelli (Italy) F Fognini	3	5
(Germany) F Fallert (Germany) O Otte	6	7
4	(Monaco) H Nys (Poland) J Zieliński	5	7	[5]
2	(Brazil) R Matos (Spain) D Vega Hernández	7	5	[10]

Final
(Germany) F Fallert (Germany) O Otte	6	5	[8]
2	(Brazil) R Matos (Spain) D Vega Hernández	3	7	[10]
