= 2022 Sofia Open – Singles =

Singles
- 2022 Sofia Open

Final
- Champion: (Switzerland) Marc-Andrea Hüsler
- Runner-up: (Denmark) Holger Rune
- Score: 6–4, 7–6^{(10–8)}

Details
- Draw: 28 (4 Q / 3 WC )
- Seeds: 8

Events
Singles	Doubles
- ATP Sofia Open

Marc-Andrea Hüsler defeated Holger Rune in the final, 6–4, 7–6^{(10–8)} to win the singles tennis title at the 2022 Sofia Open. It was his first ATP Tour title. Hüsler saved two match points en route, in his quarterfinal match against Kamil Majchrzak.

Jannik Sinner was the two-time defending champion, but retired from his semifinal match against Rune.

== Seeds ==
The top four seeds received a bye into the second round.

1. (Italy) Jannik Sinner (semifinals, retired)
2. (Spain) Pablo Carreño Busta (second round)
3. (Bulgaria) Grigor Dimitrov (second round)
4. (Italy) Lorenzo Musetti (semifinals)
5. (Denmark) Holger Rune (final)
6. (Georgia (country)) Nikoloz Basilashvili (first round)
7. (United Kingdom) Jack Draper (withdrew)
8. (Germany) Oscar Otte (second round)

== Draw ==
Key

- Q = Qualifier
- WC = Wild card
- LL = Lucky loser
- Alt = Alternate
- ITF = ITF entry
- PR = Protected ranking
- SR = Special ranking
- SE = Special exempt
- JE = Junior exempt
- JR = Junior Accelerator Programme entrant
- CO = College Accelerator Programme entrant
- NG = Next Gen Accelerator Program entrant
- w/o = Walkover
- r = Retired
- d = Defaulted

=== Finals ===
Semifinals
1	(Italy) Jannik Sinner	7	4	2^{r}
5	(Denmark) Holger Rune	5	6	5
4	(Italy) Lorenzo Musetti	6^{5}	5
(Switzerland) Marc-Andrea Hüsler	7^{7}	7

Final
5	(Denmark) Holger Rune	4	6^{8}
(Switzerland) Marc-Andrea Hüsler	6	7^{10}

=== Top half ===
First round
LL	(Bosnia and Herzegovina) M Bašić	6	3	2
(Portugal) N Borges	3	6	6
(Australia) A Vukic	7^{13}	7
(Italy) F Fognini	6^{11}	5
(Spain) F Verdasco	7^{7}	7
6	(Georgia (country)) N Basilashvili	6^{1}	5
(Sweden) M Ymer	6^{8}	6	5
I Ivashka	7^{10}	4	7
(Italy) L Sonego	6	6
(Spain) B Zapata Miralles	3	4
(Netherlands) T van Rijthoven	6^{2}	6^{6}
5	(Denmark) H Rune	7^{7}	7^{8}

Second round
1	(Italy) J Sinner	6	6
(Portugal) N Borges	3	4
(Australia) A Vukic	1	6	6
(Spain) F Verdasco	6	4	3
3	(Bulgaria) G Dimitrov	3	6^{3}
I Ivashka	6	7^{7}
(Italy) L Sonego	7^{7}	4	3
5	(Denmark) H Rune	6^{1}	6	6

Quarterfinals
1	(Italy) J Sinner	6	6
(Australia) A Vukic	2	3
I Ivashka	2	7	4
5	(Denmark) H Rune	6	5	6

Semifinals
1	(Italy) J Sinner	7	4	2^{r}
5	(Denmark) H Rune	5	6	5

=== Bottom half ===
First round
Q	(Germany) J-L Struff	4	6	6
(Serbia) D Lajović	6	3	2
Q	(France) U Humbert	7^{7}	6
WC	(Bulgaria) D Kuzmanov	6^{4}	4
(Czech Republic) J Lehečka	5	3
WC	(Bulgaria) A Lazarov	7	6
8	(Germany) O Otte	6	6
Q	(Sweden) DN Mădăraș	3	2
(Lithuania) R Berankis	5	2
(Poland) K Majchrzak	7	6
(Switzerland) M-A Hüsler	6	6
Q	(France) G Blancaneaux	4	4

Second round
Q	(Germany) J-L Struff	6	6
Q	(France) U Humbert	3	1
WC	(Bulgaria) A Lazarov	7^{7}	6^{8}	2
4	(Italy) L Musetti	6^{5}	7^{10}	6
8	(Germany) O Otte	6	2	4
(Poland) K Majchrzak	4	6	6
(Switzerland) M-A Hüsler	6	3	6
2	(Spain) P Carreño Busta	3	6	2

Quarterfinals
Q	(Germany) J-L Struff	6^{3}	1
4	(Italy) L Musetti	7^{7}	6
(Poland) K Majchrzak	7^{7}	6^{6}	3
(Switzerland) M-A Hüsler	6^{4}	7^{8}	6

Semifinals
4	(Italy) L Musetti	6^{5}	5
(Switzerland) M-A Hüsler	7^{7}	7

== Qualifying ==
=== Seeds ===
1. (France) Ugo Humbert (qualified)
2. (Germany) Jan-Lennard Struff (qualified)
3. (France) Geoffrey Blancaneaux (qualified)
4. (Italy) Stefano Travaglia (first round, retired)
5. (Turkey) Altuğ Çelikbilek (first round)
6. (Italy) Andreas Seppi (qualifying competition)
7. (Italy) Salvatore Caruso (first round)
8. Alexey Vatutin (first round)

=== Qualifiers ===
1. (France) Ugo Humbert
2. (Germany) Jan-Lennard Struff
3. (France) Geoffrey Blancaneaux
4. (Sweden) Dragoș Nicolae Mădăraș

=== Lucky loser ===
1. (Bosnia and Herzegovina) Mirza Bašić

=== Qualifying draw ===
==== First qualifier ====
First round
1	(France) Ugo Humbert	6	6
(Latvia) Ernests Gulbis	3	2
(Romania) Filip Cristian Jianu	6	4	7^{7}
5	(Turkey) Altuğ Çelikbilek	1	6	6^{2}

Qualifying competition
1	(France) Ugo Humbert	6	7^{7}
(Romania) Filip Cristian Jianu	3	6^{3}

==== Second qualifier ====
First round
2	(Germany) Jan-Lennard Struff	6	6
Alt	(Tunisia) Aziz Dougaz	3	2
(Bosnia and Herzegovina) Mirza Bašić	7	6
8	Alexey Vatutin	5	1

Qualifying competition
2	(Germany) Jan-Lennard Struff	6	6
(Bosnia and Herzegovina) Mirza Bašić	3	4

==== Third qualifier ====
First round
3	(France) Geoffrey Blancaneaux	4	6	6
(Netherlands) Robin Haase	6	1	3
WC	(Bulgaria) Alexander Donski	4	2
6	(Italy) Andreas Seppi	6	6

Qualifying competition
3	(France) Geoffrey Blancaneaux	2	6	6
6	(Italy) Andreas Seppi	6	3	4

==== Fourth qualifier ====
First round
4	(Italy) Stefano Travaglia	0^{r}
Alt	(Sweden) Dragoș Nicolae Mădăraș	5
WC	(Bulgaria) Petr Nesterov	7^{7}	6
7	(Italy) Salvatore Caruso	6^{4}	4

Qualifying competition
Alt	(Sweden) Dragoș Nicolae Mădăraș	6	6
WC	(Bulgaria) Petr Nesterov	4	2
