= 2022 Sofia Open =

- Date: 26 September – 2 October
- Edition: 7th
- Category: ATP World Tour 250 series
- Draw: 28S / 16D
- Prize money: €534,555
- Surface: Hard (indoor)
- Location: Sofia, Bulgaria
- Venue: Arena Armeec

Champions

Singles
- (Switzerland) Marc-Andrea Hüsler

Doubles
- (Brazil) Rafael Matos / (Spain) David Vega Hernández
← 2021 ·	Sofia Open	· 2023 →

The 2022 Sofia Open was a tennis tournament to be played on indoor hard courts. It was the 7th edition of the event and it was part of the ATP World Tour 250 series of the 2022 ATP Tour. It was played at the Arena Armeec in Sofia, Bulgaria, from 26 September to 2 October 2022.

== Champions ==
=== Singles ===
- (Switzerland) Marc-Andrea Hüsler def. (Denmark) Holger Rune, 6–4, 7–6^{(10–8)}

=== Doubles ===
- (Brazil) Rafael Matos / (Spain) David Vega Hernández def. (Germany) Fabian Fallert / (Germany) Oscar Otte, 3–6, 7–5, [10–8]

== Singles main-draw entrants ==
=== Seeds ===
Country	Player	Rank^{1}	Seed
ITA	Jannik Sinner	11	1
ESP	Pablo Carreño Busta	14	2
BUL	Grigor Dimitrov	23	3
ITA	Lorenzo Musetti	30	4
DEN	Holger Rune	31	5
GEO	Nikoloz Basilashvili	36	6
~~GBR~~	~~Jack Draper~~	~~46~~	~~7~~
GER	Oscar Otte	52	8

- ^{1} Rankings are as of 19 September 2022.

=== Other entrants ===
The following players received wildcards into the main draw:

- (Bulgaria) Dimitar Kuzmanov
- (Bulgaria) Alexandar Lazarov
- ~~(Switzerland) Stan Wawrinka~~

The following players received entry from the qualifying draw:

- (France) Geoffrey Blancaneaux
- (France) Ugo Humbert
- (Sweden) Dragoș Nicolae Mădăraș
- (Germany) Jan-Lennard Struff

The following player received entry as a lucky loser:

- (Bosnia and Herzegovina) Mirza Bašić

=== Withdrawals ===
- (Kazakhstan) Alexander Bublik → replaced by (Spain) Fernando Verdasco
- (Spain) Roberto Carballés Baena → replaced by (Serbia) Dušan Lajović
- (Spain) Alejandro Davidovich Fokina → replaced by (Switzerland) Marc-Andrea Hüsler
- (United Kingdom) Jack Draper → replaced by (Bosnia and Herzegovina) Mirza Bašić
- (Poland) Hubert Hurkacz → replaced by (Portugal) Nuno Borges
- (Serbia) Filip Krajinović → replaced by (Sweden) Mikael Ymer
- (France) Gaël Monfils → replaced by (Poland) Kamil Majchrzak
- (Switzerland) Stan Wawrinka → replaced by (Australia) Aleksandar Vukic

== Doubles main-draw entrants ==
=== Seeds ===
Country	Player	Country	Player	Rank^{1}	Seed
ITA	Simone Bolelli	ITA	Fabio Fognini	50	1
BRA	Rafael Matos	ESP	David Vega Hernández	75	2
POR	Francisco Cabral	GBR	Jamie Murray	77	3
MON	Hugo Nys	POL	Jan Zieliński	84	4

- ^{1} Rankings are as of 19 September 2022.

=== Other entrants ===
The following pairs received wildcards into the doubles main draw:

- (Bulgaria) Alexander Donski / (Bulgaria) Alexandar Lazarov
- (Bulgaria) Yanaki Milev / (Bulgaria) Petr Nesterov

The following pair received entry as alternates:

- (United States) Jack Vance / (United States) Jamie Vance

=== Withdrawals ===
- (Kazakhstan) Alexander Bublik / (Italy) Lorenzo Musetti → replaced by (United States) Jack Vance / (United States) Jamie Vance
- (Spain) Roberto Carballés Baena / (Spain) Bernabé Zapata Miralles → replaced by (Switzerland) Marc-Andrea Hüsler / (Spain) Bernabé Zapata Miralles
