= 2020 ITF Men's World Tennis Tour (October–December) =

The 2020 ITF Men's World Tennis Tour is the 2020 edition of the second tier tour for men's professional tennis. It is organised by the International Tennis Federation and is a tier below the ATP Tour. The ITF Men's World Tennis Tour includes tournaments with prize money ranging from $15,000 to $25,000.

== Key ==
M25 tournaments
M15 tournaments

== Month ==
=== October ===
Week of	Tournament	Winner	Runners-up	Semifinalists	Quarterfinalists
October 5	Sharm El Sheikh, Egypt; Hard; M15; Singles and Doubles Draws	(Latvia) Mārtiņš Podžus; 6–4, 1–6, 7–5	(United States) Nick Chappell	(Kazakhstan) Denis Yevseyev (Ukraine) Vitaliy Sachko	(United States) Felix Corwin (Ukraine) Vladyslav Manafov (Italy) Francesco Vilardo (Serbia) Marko Topo
October 5	Sharm El Sheikh, Egypt; Hard; M15; Singles and Doubles Draws	(Ukraine) Vladyslav Manafov (Ukraine) Vitaliy Sachko; 6–3, 6–3	(Ukraine) Yurii Dzhavakian (Latvia) Mārtiņš Podžus	(Kazakhstan) Denis Yevseyev (Ukraine) Vitaliy Sachko	(United States) Felix Corwin (Ukraine) Vladyslav Manafov (Italy) Francesco Vilardo (Serbia) Marko Topo
October 5	Setúbal, Portugal; Hard; M15; Singles and Doubles Draws	(Germany) Sebastian Fanselow; 6–4, 7–6^{(7–3)}	(Portugal) Nuno Borges	(Brazil) Mateus Alves (Italy) Francesco Forti	(Brazil) João Lucas Reis da Silva (Japan) Naoki Nakagawa (Finland) Patrik Niklas-Salminen (Sweden) Christian Lindell
October 5	Setúbal, Portugal; Hard; M15; Singles and Doubles Draws	(Portugal) Nuno Borges (Portugal) Francisco Cabral; 6–2, 6–7^{(5–7)}, [10–7]	(Brazil) Mateus Alves (Brazil) Igor Marcondes	(Brazil) Mateus Alves (Italy) Francesco Forti	(Brazil) João Lucas Reis da Silva (Japan) Naoki Nakagawa (Finland) Patrik Niklas-Salminen (Sweden) Christian Lindell
October 5	Monastir, Tunisia; Hard; M15; Singles and Doubles Draws	(Lithuania) Laurynas Grigelis; 6–3, 6–4	(Argentina) Matías Franco Descotte	(Argentina) Fermín Tenti (Uruguay) Martín Cuevas	(Argentina) Thiago Agustín Tirante (United Kingdom) Oscar Weightman (France) Mathieu Scaglia (Argentina) Facundo Juárez
October 5	Monastir, Tunisia; Hard; M15; Singles and Doubles Draws	(Italy) Marco Bortolotti (Poland) Daniel Michalski; 4–6, 6–2, [10–6]	(Argentina) Facundo Juárez (Brazil) Gabriel Roveri Sidney	(Argentina) Fermín Tenti (Uruguay) Martín Cuevas	(Argentina) Thiago Agustín Tirante (United Kingdom) Oscar Weightman (France) Mathieu Scaglia (Argentina) Facundo Juárez
October 12	Rodez, France; Hard (indoor); M25+H; Singles and Doubles Draws	(Netherlands) Igor Sijsling; 6–3, 6–3	(Netherlands) Jelle Sels	(Finland) Otto Virtanen (Norway) Viktor Durasovic	(France) Antoine Cornut-Chauvinc (France) Antoine Escoffier (Netherlands) Jesper de Jong (France) Maxime Hamou
October 12	Rodez, France; Hard (indoor); M25+H; Singles and Doubles Draws	(France) Sadio Doumbia (France) Fabien Reboul; 6–3, 7–5	(Netherlands) Igor Sijsling (Netherlands) Glenn Smits	(Finland) Otto Virtanen (Norway) Viktor Durasovic	(France) Antoine Cornut-Chauvinc (France) Antoine Escoffier (Netherlands) Jesper de Jong (France) Maxime Hamou
October 12	Sharm El Sheikh, Egypt; Hard; M15; Singles and Doubles Draws	(Spain) Pablo Vivero González; 7–5, 5–7, 6–2	(United States) Felix Corwin	(Bulgaria) Alexandar Lazarov (Kazakhstan) Timofei Skatov	(Ukraine) Georgii Kravchenko (Czech Republic) Marek Gengel (Japan) Shintaro Mochizuki (Netherlands) Gijs Brouwer
October 12	Sharm El Sheikh, Egypt; Hard; M15; Singles and Doubles Draws	(Japan) Shintaro Mochizuki (Japan) Rio Noguchi; 6–2, 7–5	(Netherlands) Gijs Brouwer (Netherlands) Ryan Nijboer	(Bulgaria) Alexandar Lazarov (Kazakhstan) Timofei Skatov	(Ukraine) Georgii Kravchenko (Czech Republic) Marek Gengel (Japan) Shintaro Mochizuki (Netherlands) Gijs Brouwer
October 12	Monastir, Tunisia; Hard; M15; Singles and Doubles Draws	(Lithuania) Laurynas Grigelis; 5–7, 7–5, 7–6^{(10–8)}	(Poland) Daniel Michalski	(Argentina) Thiago Agustín Tirante (Uruguay) Martín Cuevas	(Germany) Mats Rosenkranz (Argentina) Matías Franco Descotte (France) Constantin Bittoun Kouzmine (Estonia) Vladimir Ivanov
October 12	Monastir, Tunisia; Hard; M15; Singles and Doubles Draws	(Estonia) Vladimir Ivanov (Russia) Alibek Kachmazov; 6–4, 6–4	(Lithuania) Laurynas Grigelis (Lithuania) Lukas Mugevičius	(Argentina) Thiago Agustín Tirante (Uruguay) Martín Cuevas	(Germany) Mats Rosenkranz (Argentina) Matías Franco Descotte (France) Constantin Bittoun Kouzmine (Estonia) Vladimir Ivanov
October 19	Hamburg, Germany; Hard (indoor); M25; Singles and Doubles Draws	(Poland) Kacper Żuk; 6–4, 7–6^{(7–4)}	(Chinese Taipei) Tseng Chun-hsin	(Italy) Raúl Brancaccio (United Kingdom) Anton Matusevich	(United States) Stefan Kozlov (Germany) Timo Stodder (France) Manuel Guinard (Slovakia) Alex Molčan
October 19	Hamburg, Germany; Hard (indoor); M25; Singles and Doubles Draws	(Norway) Viktor Durasovic (Sweden) Markus Eriksson; 6–3, 5–7, [11–9]	(Italy) Raúl Brancaccio (Netherlands) Mark Vervoort	(Italy) Raúl Brancaccio (United Kingdom) Anton Matusevich	(United States) Stefan Kozlov (Germany) Timo Stodder (France) Manuel Guinard (Slovakia) Alex Molčan
October 19	Sharm El Sheikh, Egypt; Hard; M15; Singles and Doubles Draws	(Netherlands) Gijs Brouwer; 6–3, 7–6^{(7–4)}	(Ukraine) Vladyslav Orlov	(Spain) Pablo Vivero González (Japan) Shintaro Mochizuki	(Italy) Flavio Cobolli (Latvia) Mārtiņš Podžus (United States) Dusty Boyer (Ukraine) Vladyslav Manafov
October 19	Sharm El Sheikh, Egypt; Hard; M15; Singles and Doubles Draws	(India) Arjun Kadhe (Ukraine) Vladyslav Manafov; 6–3, 6–4	(Russia) Ivan Gakhov (Ukraine) Georgii Kravchenko	(Spain) Pablo Vivero González (Japan) Shintaro Mochizuki	(Italy) Flavio Cobolli (Latvia) Mārtiņš Podžus (United States) Dusty Boyer (Ukraine) Vladyslav Manafov
October 19	Monastir, Tunisia; Hard; M15; Singles and Doubles Draws	(Argentina) Thiago Agustín Tirante; 7–6^{(7–2)}, 6–7^{(4–7)}, 6–3	(Poland) Wojciech Marek	(Slovenia) Tomás Lipovšek Puches (Estonia) Daniil Glinka	(Tunisia) Aziz Dougaz (France) Jean Thirouin (Argentina) Guido Iván Justo (United Kingdom) Oscar Weightman
October 19	Monastir, Tunisia; Hard; M15; Singles and Doubles Draws	(Tunisia) Aziz Dougaz (Tunisia) Skander Mansouri; 6–3, 7–5	(Switzerland) Mirko Martinez (Estonia) Kristjan Tamm	(Slovenia) Tomás Lipovšek Puches (Estonia) Daniil Glinka	(Tunisia) Aziz Dougaz (France) Jean Thirouin (Argentina) Guido Iván Justo (United Kingdom) Oscar Weightman
October 26	Vale do Lobo, Portugal; Hard; M25; Singles and Doubles Draws	(Poland) Kacper Żuk; 6–4, 6–3	(Portugal) Nuno Borges	(Portugal) Gastão Elias (Chinese Taipei) Tseng Chun-hsin	(Croatia) Viktor Galović (France) Maxime Hamou (Argentina) Pedro Cachin (Netherlands) Jesper de Jong
October 26	Vale do Lobo, Portugal; Hard; M25; Singles and Doubles Draws	(Netherlands) Jesper de Jong (Netherlands) Jelle Sels; 7–6^{(7–3)}, 5–7, [10–8]	(Portugal) Nuno Borges (Portugal) Francisco Cabral	(Portugal) Gastão Elias (Chinese Taipei) Tseng Chun-hsin	(Croatia) Viktor Galović (France) Maxime Hamou (Argentina) Pedro Cachin (Netherlands) Jesper de Jong
October 26	Sharm El Sheikh, Egypt; Hard; M15; Singles and Doubles Draws	(United States) Felix Corwin; 4–6, 6–2, 7–6^{(7–4)}	(Czech Republic) David Poljak	(Italy) Alessandro Bega (Ukraine) Oleksii Krutykh	(Switzerland) Yann Marti (Ukraine) Vladyslav Orlov (Italy) Francesco Vilardo (Japan) Shintaro Mochizuki
October 26	Sharm El Sheikh, Egypt; Hard; M15; Singles and Doubles Draws	(Serbia) Marko Miladinović (Serbia) Miljan Zekić; 6–4, 6–3	(Italy) Alessandro Bega (Cyprus) Petros Chrysochos	(Italy) Alessandro Bega (Ukraine) Oleksii Krutykh	(Switzerland) Yann Marti (Ukraine) Vladyslav Orlov (Italy) Francesco Vilardo (Japan) Shintaro Mochizuki
October 26	Sarreguemines, France; Carpet (indoor); M15; Singles and Doubles Draws	Tournament cancelled due to the lockdown measures applied in France caused by the coronavirus pandemic.			(France) Titouan Droguet (France) Arthur Reymond (France) Antoine Escoffier (Estonia) Kenneth Raisma (France) Arthur Cazaux (Belgium) Christopher Heyman (Germany) Tobias Simon (Germany) Elmar Ejupovic
October 26	Heraklion, Greece; Hard; M15; Singles and Doubles Draws	(France) Evan Furness; 6–3, 1–6, 6–3	(Croatia) Matija Pecotić	(Belarus) Uladzimir Ignatik (Hungary) Fábián Marozsán	(Czech Republic) Robin Staněk (United States) Vasil Kirkov (United States) Toby Kodat (Italy) Jacopo Berrettini
October 26	Heraklion, Greece; Hard; M15; Singles and Doubles Draws	(France) Evan Furness (France) Clément Tabur; 7–6^{(7–4)}, 7–6^{(7–4)}	(Germany) Lucas Gerch (Mexico) Gerardo López Villaseñor	(Belarus) Uladzimir Ignatik (Hungary) Fábián Marozsán	(Czech Republic) Robin Staněk (United States) Vasil Kirkov (United States) Toby Kodat (Italy) Jacopo Berrettini
October 26	Monastir, Tunisia; Hard; M15; Singles and Doubles Draws	(Tunisia) Skander Mansouri; 4–6, 6–3, 7–6^{(7–5)}	(Argentina) Thiago Agustín Tirante	(Russia) Alibek Kachmazov (Argentina) Guido Iván Justo	(France) Yanais Laurent (Tunisia) Moez Echargui (Argentina) Matías Franco Descotte (Poland) Wojciech Marek
October 26	Monastir, Tunisia; Hard; M15; Singles and Doubles Draws	(Germany) Maik Steiner (Germany) Patrick Zahraj; 4–6, 6–4, [10–8]	(Mexico) Luis Patiño (Argentina) Thiago Agustín Tirante	(Russia) Alibek Kachmazov (Argentina) Guido Iván Justo	(France) Yanais Laurent (Tunisia) Moez Echargui (Argentina) Matías Franco Descotte (Poland) Wojciech Marek

=== November ===
Week of	Tournament	Winner	Runners-up	Semifinalists	Quarterfinalists
November 2	Sharm El Sheikh, Egypt; Hard; M15; Singles and Doubles Draws	(Italy) Alessandro Bega; 6–4, 6–2	(Cyprus) Petros Chrysochos	(Ukraine) Vladyslav Orlov (Czech Republic) Marek Gengel	(Czech Republic) David Poljak (Ukraine) Oleksii Krutykh (Belarus) Yaraslav Shyla (Italy) Francesco Vilardo
November 2	Sharm El Sheikh, Egypt; Hard; M15; Singles and Doubles Draws	(India) Arjun Kadhe (Ukraine) Vladyslav Manafov; 6–1, 6–3	(Ukraine) Vladyslav Orlov (Italy) Francesco Vilardo	(Ukraine) Vladyslav Orlov (Czech Republic) Marek Gengel	(Czech Republic) David Poljak (Ukraine) Oleksii Krutykh (Belarus) Yaraslav Shyla (Italy) Francesco Vilardo
November 2	Pärnu, Estonia; Hard (indoor); M15; Singles and Doubles Draws	(Finland) Otto Virtanen; 6–3, 6–0	(Russia) Yan Sabanin	(Finland) Patrik Niklas-Salminen (Estonia) Mattias Siimar	(Netherlands) Mick Veldheer (Switzerland) Leandro Riedi (Sweden) Simon Freund (Ukraine) Eric Vanshelboim
November 2	Pärnu, Estonia; Hard (indoor); M15; Singles and Doubles Draws	(Estonia) Johannes Seeman (Estonia) Siim Troost; 6–3, 3–6, [10–6]	(Estonia) Vladimir Ivanov (Russia) Yan Sabanin	(Finland) Patrik Niklas-Salminen (Estonia) Mattias Siimar	(Netherlands) Mick Veldheer (Switzerland) Leandro Riedi (Sweden) Simon Freund (Ukraine) Eric Vanshelboim
November 2	Heraklion, Greece; Hard; M15; Singles and Doubles Draws	(France) Evan Furness; 6–1, 2–6, 7–5	(Monaco) Lucas Catarina	(United Kingdom) Ryan Peniston (Italy) Francesco Forti	(China) Li Hanwen (Croatia) Matija Pecotić (Italy) Riccardo Balzerani (Germany) Lucas Gerch
November 2	Heraklion, Greece; Hard; M15; Singles and Doubles Draws	(Brazil) Mateus Alves (Argentina) Facundo Díaz Acosta; 4–6, 6–3, [10–4]	(France) Corentin Denolly (France) Jonathan Eysseric	(United Kingdom) Ryan Peniston (Italy) Francesco Forti	(China) Li Hanwen (Croatia) Matija Pecotić (Italy) Riccardo Balzerani (Germany) Lucas Gerch
November 2	Quinta do Lago, Portugal; Hard; M15; Singles and Doubles Draws	(Portugal) Nuno Borges; 6–0, 6–1	(Belgium) Michael Geerts	(France) Antoine Escoffier (Germany) Sebastian Fanselow	(Portugal) João Monteiro (Italy) Matteo Arnaldi (Chinese Taipei) Yang Tsung-hua (Portugal) Francisco Cabral
November 2	Quinta do Lago, Portugal; Hard; M15; Singles and Doubles Draws	(Brazil) Matheus Pucinelli de Almeida (Brazil) João Lucas Reis da Silva; 7–6^{(7–3)}, 6–1	(United Kingdom) Jonathan Binding (Poland) Yann Wójcik	(France) Antoine Escoffier (Germany) Sebastian Fanselow	(Portugal) João Monteiro (Italy) Matteo Arnaldi (Chinese Taipei) Yang Tsung-hua (Portugal) Francisco Cabral
November 2	Fayetteville, United States; Hard; M15; Singles and Doubles Draws	(Canada) Alexis Galarneau; 6–2, 6–1	(Ecuador) Roberto Quiroz	(United States) Brandon Holt (Canada) Liam Draxl	(United States) Thai-Son Kwiatkowski (United States) Patrick Kypson (United Kingdom) Charles Broom (United States) Martin Damm
November 2	Fayetteville, United States; Hard; M15; Singles and Doubles Draws	(United Kingdom) Charles Broom (Chile) Matías Soto; 2–6, 6–2, [10–5]	(Canada) Liam Draxl (United States) Aleksandar Kovacevic	(United States) Brandon Holt (Canada) Liam Draxl	(United States) Thai-Son Kwiatkowski (United States) Patrick Kypson (United Kingdom) Charles Broom (United States) Martin Damm
November 9	Sharm El Sheikh, Egypt; Hard; M15; Singles and Doubles Draws	(Cyprus) Petros Chrysochos; 6–3, 6–2	(Ukraine) Vladyslav Orlov	(Russia) Bogdan Bobrov (Italy) Erik Crepaldi	(United States) Christian Langmo (Czech Republic) Petr Michnev (Ukraine) Vladyslav Manafov (Czech Republic) David Poljak
November 9	Sharm El Sheikh, Egypt; Hard; M15; Singles and Doubles Draws	(Ukraine) Vladyslav Manafov (Belarus) Yaraslav Shyla; 4–6, 6–4, [10–7]	(Belgium) Arnaud Bovy (Belgium) Gauthier Onclin	(Russia) Bogdan Bobrov (Italy) Erik Crepaldi	(United States) Christian Langmo (Czech Republic) Petr Michnev (Ukraine) Vladyslav Manafov (Czech Republic) David Poljak
November 9	Heraklion, Greece; Hard; M15; Singles and Doubles Draws	(France) Evan Furness; 6–3, 4–6, 6–1	(Monaco) Lucas Catarina	(Brazil) Mateus Alves (United Kingdom) Ryan Peniston	(Germany) Sebastian Fanselow (Romania) Cezar Crețu (Germany) Lucas Gerch (France) Corentin Denolly
November 9	Heraklion, Greece; Hard; M15; Singles and Doubles Draws	(Switzerland) Jakub Paul (Netherlands) Mick Veldheer; 6–1, 6–4	(Russia) Artem Dubrivnyy (Kazakhstan) Denis Yevseyev	(Brazil) Mateus Alves (United Kingdom) Ryan Peniston	(Germany) Sebastian Fanselow (Romania) Cezar Crețu (Germany) Lucas Gerch (France) Corentin Denolly
November 9	Valldoreix, Spain; Clay; M15; Singles and Doubles Draws	(Denmark) Holger Vitus Nødskov Rune; 7–6^{(7–0)}, 6–3	(Spain) Javier Barranco Cosano	(France) Thomas Laurent (Spain) Nikolás Sánchez Izquierdo	(Kazakhstan) Timofey Skatov (Spain) Pol Toledo Bagué (Argentina) Pedro Cachin (Italy) Gianluigi Quinzi
November 9	Valldoreix, Spain; Clay; M15; Singles and Doubles Draws	(Jordan) Abedallah Shelbayh (Spain) Pedro Vives Marcos; 7–5, 6–3	(Denmark) Holger Vitus Nødskov Rune (Ukraine) Eric Vanshelboim	(France) Thomas Laurent (Spain) Nikolás Sánchez Izquierdo	(Kazakhstan) Timofey Skatov (Spain) Pol Toledo Bagué (Argentina) Pedro Cachin (Italy) Gianluigi Quinzi
November 16	Sharm El Sheikh, Egypt; Hard; M15; Singles and Doubles Draws	(Ukraine) Vladyslav Orlov; 6–0, 6–3	(Italy) Erik Crepaldi	(Belgium) Arnaud Bovy (Bosnia and Herzegovina) Aldin Šetkić	(Egypt) Karim-Mohamed Maamoun (Serbia) Miljan Zekić (Argentina) Mariano Navone (Italy) Francesco Vilardo
November 16	Sharm El Sheikh, Egypt; Hard; M15; Singles and Doubles Draws	(Bosnia and Herzegovina) Aldin Šetkić (Belarus) Yaraslav Shyla; 7–6^{(7–2)}, 6–3	(India) Siddhant Banthia (United Kingdom) Aidan McHugh	(Belgium) Arnaud Bovy (Bosnia and Herzegovina) Aldin Šetkić	(Egypt) Karim-Mohamed Maamoun (Serbia) Miljan Zekić (Argentina) Mariano Navone (Italy) Francesco Vilardo
November 16	Heraklion, Greece; Hard; M15; Singles and Doubles Draws	(Brazil) Mateus Alves; 7–6^{(8–6)}, 6–4	(Bulgaria) Adrian Andreev	(Netherlands) Tim van Rijthoven (Argentina) Facundo Díaz Acosta	(North Macedonia) Kalin Ivanovski (France) Maxime Hamou (Kazakhstan) Denis Yevseyev (France) Corentin Denolly
November 16	Heraklion, Greece; Hard; M15; Singles and Doubles Draws	(Austria) Lucas Miedler (Austria) Neil Oberleitner; 6–4, 6–2	(Netherlands) Gijs Brouwer (Netherlands) Mick Veldheer	(Netherlands) Tim van Rijthoven (Argentina) Facundo Díaz Acosta	(North Macedonia) Kalin Ivanovski (France) Maxime Hamou (Kazakhstan) Denis Yevseyev (France) Corentin Denolly
November 16	Villena, Spain; Clay; M15; Singles and Doubles Draws	(Spain) Pol Martín Tiffon; 6–4, 6–4	(Argentina) Marco Trungelliti	(Spain) Nikolás Sánchez Izquierdo (Spain) Carlos López Montagud	(Morocco) Lamine Ouahab (France) Matthieu Perchicot (Argentina) Pedro Cachin (Spain) Javier Barranco Cosano
November 16	Villena, Spain; Clay; M15; Singles and Doubles Draws	(Spain) Alberto Barroso Campos (Spain) Benjamín Winter López; 7–5, 7–5	(Portugal) Nuno Borges (Portugal) Francisco Cabral	(Spain) Nikolás Sánchez Izquierdo (Spain) Carlos López Montagud	(Morocco) Lamine Ouahab (France) Matthieu Perchicot (Argentina) Pedro Cachin (Spain) Javier Barranco Cosano
November 23	Cairo, Egypt; Clay; M15; Singles and Doubles Draws	(Serbia) Miljan Zekić; 6–1, 7–6^{(7–3)}	(Netherlands) Niels Visker	(Italy) Emiliano Maggioli (Poland) Daniel Michalski	(Argentina) Juan Bautista Otegui (Netherlands) Sidané Pontjodikromo (Argentina) Juan Pablo Paz (Mexico) Luis Patiño
November 23	Cairo, Egypt; Clay; M15; Singles and Doubles Draws	(Argentina) Juan Bautista Otegui (Argentina) Juan Pablo Paz; 6–2, 7–5	(Switzerland) Johan Nikles (Spain) Carlos Sánchez Jover	(Italy) Emiliano Maggioli (Poland) Daniel Michalski	(Argentina) Juan Bautista Otegui (Netherlands) Sidané Pontjodikromo (Argentina) Juan Pablo Paz (Mexico) Luis Patiño
November 23	Heraklion, Greece; Hard; M15; Singles and Doubles Draws	(Bulgaria) Adrian Andreev; 6–3, 6–4	(Czech Republic) Jiří Lehečka	(Brazil) Mateus Alves (United Kingdom) Ryan Peniston	(United Kingdom) Henry Patten (Germany) Lucas Gerch (Germany) Timo Stodder (Netherlands) Gijs Brouwer
November 23	Heraklion, Greece; Hard; M15; Singles and Doubles Draws	(Germany) Timo Stodder (Germany) Robert Strombachs; 6–4, 6–4	(Austria) Lucas Miedler (Austria) Neil Oberleitner	(Brazil) Mateus Alves (United Kingdom) Ryan Peniston	(United Kingdom) Henry Patten (Germany) Lucas Gerch (Germany) Timo Stodder (Netherlands) Gijs Brouwer
November 23	Bratislava, Slovakia; Hard (indoor); M15; Singles and Doubles Draws	(Belgium) Zizou Bergs; 6–4, 6–2	(Russia) Bogdan Bobrov	(Ukraine) Danylo Kalenichenko (Hungary) Péter Fajta	(Ukraine) Vadym Ursu (Russia) Artem Dubrivnyy (Germany) Tobias Simon (Czech Republic) Marek Gengel
November 23	Bratislava, Slovakia; Hard (indoor); M15; Singles and Doubles Draws	(Russia) Artem Dubrivnyy (Ukraine) Vadym Ursu; 6–2, 6–0	(Slovakia) Lukáš Palovič (Slovakia) Lukáš Pokorný	(Ukraine) Danylo Kalenichenko (Hungary) Péter Fajta	(Ukraine) Vadym Ursu (Russia) Artem Dubrivnyy (Germany) Tobias Simon (Czech Republic) Marek Gengel
November 23	Benicarló, Spain; Clay; M15; Singles and Doubles Draws	(Spain) Nicolás Álvarez Varona; 7–6^{(15–13)}, 6–4	(Russia) Ivan Gakhov	(Italy) Marco Bortolotti (France) Antoine Cornut-Chauvinc	(France) Lilian Marmousez (Spain) Pol Martín Tiffon (Spain) Eduard Esteve Lobato (France) Kenny de Schepper
November 23	Benicarló, Spain; Clay; M15; Singles and Doubles Draws	(Spain) Javier Barranco Cosano (Spain) Albert Roglan; 6–3, 2–6, [11–9]	(Spain) Alberto Barroso Campos (Spain) Benjamín Winter López	(Italy) Marco Bortolotti (France) Antoine Cornut-Chauvinc	(France) Lilian Marmousez (Spain) Pol Martín Tiffon (Spain) Eduard Esteve Lobato (France) Kenny de Schepper
November 23	Monastir, Tunisia; Hard; M15; Singles and Doubles Draws	(Turkey) Ergi Kırkın; 1–6, 6–4, 6–1	(Estonia) Kenneth Raisma	(Slovenia) Tomás Lipovšek Puches (Italy) Luca Giacomini	(Russia) Alibek Kachmazov (Italy) Luca Potenza (France) Titouan Droguet (Germany) Mats Rosenkranz
November 23	Monastir, Tunisia; Hard; M15; Singles and Doubles Draws	(Tunisia) Anis Ghorbel (Tunisia) Aziz Ouakaa; Walkover	(Estonia) Kenneth Raisma (Estonia) Kristjan Tamm	(Slovenia) Tomás Lipovšek Puches (Italy) Luca Giacomini	(Russia) Alibek Kachmazov (Italy) Luca Potenza (France) Titouan Droguet (Germany) Mats Rosenkranz
November 30	Santo Domingo, Dominican Republic; Hard; M15; Singles and Doubles Draws	(United States) Oliver Crawford; 6–3, 6–1	(United States) Alex Rybakov	(United States) Nick Chappell (United States) Keegan Smith	(Brazil) Leonardo Civita-Telles (United States) Zane Khan (Canada) Juan Carlos Aguilar (Venezuela) Ricardo Rodríguez
November 30	Santo Domingo, Dominican Republic; Hard; M15; Singles and Doubles Draws	(Dominican Republic) Nick Hardt (Japan) Shintaro Mochizuki; 6–3, 6–3	(Chile) Gonzalo Lama (Ecuador) Antonio Cayetano March	(United States) Nick Chappell (United States) Keegan Smith	(Brazil) Leonardo Civita-Telles (United States) Zane Khan (Canada) Juan Carlos Aguilar (Venezuela) Ricardo Rodríguez
November 30	Cairo, Egypt; Clay; M15; Singles and Doubles Draws	(Switzerland) Johan Nikles; 6–1, 5–7, 6–3	(Spain) Carlos Sánchez Jover	(Italy) Erik Crepaldi (Ukraine) Oleksii Krutykh	(Egypt) Karim-Mohamed Maamoun (Argentina) Juan Bautista Torres (Spain) José Francisco Vidal Azorín (Italy) Fabrizio Ornago
November 30	Cairo, Egypt; Clay; M15; Singles and Doubles Draws	(Argentina) Juan Bautista Otegui (Argentina) Juan Pablo Paz; 6–4, 6–4	(Lebanon) Hady Habib (Spain) José Francisco Vidal Azorín	(Italy) Erik Crepaldi (Ukraine) Oleksii Krutykh	(Egypt) Karim-Mohamed Maamoun (Argentina) Juan Bautista Torres (Spain) José Francisco Vidal Azorín (Italy) Fabrizio Ornago
November 30	Madrid, Spain; Clay (indoor); M15; Singles and Doubles Draws	(France) Antoine Cornut-Chauvinc; 6–4, 7–6^{(7–5)}	(Spain) Álvaro López San Martín	(Argentina) Facundo Díaz Acosta (Bulgaria) Adrian Andreev	(Spain) Carlos López Montagud (Spain) Eduard Esteve Lobato (Spain) Pablo Vivero González (Spain) Miguel Damas
November 30	Madrid, Spain; Clay (indoor); M15; Singles and Doubles Draws	(Argentina) Facundo Díaz Acosta (Mexico) Gerardo López Villaseñor; 7–6^{(7–4)}, 2–6, [10–6]	(Spain) Íñigo Cervantes (Spain) Oriol Roca Batalla	(Argentina) Facundo Díaz Acosta (Bulgaria) Adrian Andreev	(Spain) Carlos López Montagud (Spain) Eduard Esteve Lobato (Spain) Pablo Vivero González (Spain) Miguel Damas
November 30	Monastir, Tunisia; Hard; M15; Singles and Doubles Draws	(Turkey) Ergi Kırkın; 6–3, 6–1	(France) Titouan Droguet	(Tunisia) Skander Mansouri (Argentina) Matías Zukas	(France) Térence Atmane (Estonia) Kristjan Tamm (Germany) Sebastian Prechtel (Austria) David Pichler
November 30	Monastir, Tunisia; Hard; M15; Singles and Doubles Draws	(France) Théo Arribagé (France) Titouan Droguet; 4–6, 7–6^{(7–5)}, [10–6]	(Austria) Alexander Erler (Austria) David Pichler	(Tunisia) Skander Mansouri (Argentina) Matías Zukas	(France) Térence Atmane (Estonia) Kristjan Tamm (Germany) Sebastian Prechtel (Austria) David Pichler
November 30	Antalya, Turkey; Clay; M15; Singles and Doubles Draws	(Denmark) Holger Vitus Nødskov Rune; 6–0, 4–0, ret.	(Austria) Filip Misolic	(Russia) Evgenii Tiurnev (United Kingdom) Felix Gill	(Romania) Sebastian Gima (Bulgaria) Alexandar Lazarov (Italy) Flavio Cobolli (Turkey) Marsel İlhan
November 30	Antalya, Turkey; Clay; M15; Singles and Doubles Draws	(Uzbekistan) Sanjar Fayziev (Uzbekistan) Sergey Fomin; 7–6^{(7–4)}, 3–6, [10–7]	(Turkey) Umut Akkoyun (Turkey) Mert Naci Türker	(Russia) Evgenii Tiurnev (United Kingdom) Felix Gill	(Romania) Sebastian Gima (Bulgaria) Alexandar Lazarov (Italy) Flavio Cobolli (Turkey) Marsel İlhan

=== December ===
Week of	Tournament	Winner	Runners-up	Semifinalists	Quarterfinalists
December 7	Santo Domingo, Dominican Republic; Hard; M15; Singles and Doubles Draws	(Dominican Republic) Nick Hardt; 6–4, 6–0	(United States) Oliver Crawford	(United States) Nick Chappell (United States) Roy Smith	(United States) Ezekiel Clark (United States) Keegan Smith (Japan) Shintaro Mochizuki (Costa Rica) Jesse Flores
December 7	Santo Domingo, Dominican Republic; Hard; M15; Singles and Doubles Draws	(Dominican Republic) Nick Hardt (Japan) Shintaro Mochizuki; 4–6, 7–6^{(7–2)}, [10–5]	(United States) Nick Chappell (United States) Keegan Smith	(United States) Nick Chappell (United States) Roy Smith	(United States) Ezekiel Clark (United States) Keegan Smith (Japan) Shintaro Mochizuki (Costa Rica) Jesse Flores
December 7	Cairo, Egypt; Clay; M15; Singles and Doubles Draws	(Argentina) Juan Bautista Torres; 6–3, 6–3	(United States) Toby Kodat	(Italy) Erik Crepaldi (Argentina) Alejo Lorenzo Lingua Lavallén	(Argentina) Mariano Navone (Argentina) Juan Pablo Paz (Bosnia and Herzegovina) Aldin Šetkić (Lebanon) Hady Habib
December 7	Cairo, Egypt; Clay; M15; Singles and Doubles Draws	(Netherlands) Max Houkes (Netherlands) Ryan Nijboer; 6–4, 6–4	(Egypt) Akram El Sallaly (Egypt) Adham Gaber	(Italy) Erik Crepaldi (Argentina) Alejo Lorenzo Lingua Lavallén	(Argentina) Mariano Navone (Argentina) Juan Pablo Paz (Bosnia and Herzegovina) Aldin Šetkić (Lebanon) Hady Habib
December 7	Torelló, Spain; Hard; M15; Singles and Doubles Draws	(France) Arthur Cazaux; 4–6, 7–6^{(7–3)}, 6–2	(France) Quentin Robert	(Italy) Mattia Bellucci (Morocco) Lamine Ouahab	(Spain) Jaume Pla Malfeito (Italy) Luca Nardi (United Kingdom) Max Andrews (Argentina) Román Andrés Burruchaga
December 7	Torelló, Spain; Hard; M15; Singles and Doubles Draws	(Spain) Gerard Granollers (Spain) Oriol Roca Batalla; 7–6^{(9–7)}, 3–6, [11–9]	(France) Arthur Cazaux (Switzerland) Leandro Riedi	(Italy) Mattia Bellucci (Morocco) Lamine Ouahab	(Spain) Jaume Pla Malfeito (Italy) Luca Nardi (United Kingdom) Max Andrews (Argentina) Román Andrés Burruchaga
December 7	Monastir, Tunisia; Hard; M15; Singles and Doubles Draws	(Estonia) Kristjan Tamm; 4–6, 6–3, 6–3	(Russia) Artem Dubrivnyy	(Argentina) Matías Franco Descotte (Poland) Michał Dembek	(Italy) Daniele Capecchi (Austria) David Pichler (Italy) Luca Potenza (France) Lucas Poullain
December 7	Monastir, Tunisia; Hard; M15; Singles and Doubles Draws	(Austria) Alexander Erler (Austria) David Pichler; 6–2, 7–6^{(14–12)}	(Tunisia) Skander Mansouri (Germany) Mats Rosenkranz	(Argentina) Matías Franco Descotte (Poland) Michał Dembek	(Italy) Daniele Capecchi (Austria) David Pichler (Italy) Luca Potenza (France) Lucas Poullain
December 7	Antalya, Turkey; Clay; M15; Singles and Doubles Draws	(Bosnia and Herzegovina) Nerman Fatić vs (Sweden) Dragoș Nicolae Mădăraș; The final was abandoned due to poor weather. Both players split ranking points and prize money.		(Ukraine) Georgii Kravchenko (Turkey) Sarp Ağabigün	(Romania) Sebastian Gima (United Kingdom) Paul Jubb (Turkey) Cengiz Aksu (Italy) Luciano Darderi
December 7	Antalya, Turkey; Clay; M15; Singles and Doubles Draws	(Uzbekistan) Sanjar Fayziev (Uzbekistan) Sergey Fomin; 6–3, 6–4	(Turkey) Cengiz Aksu (Turkey) Yankı Erel	(Ukraine) Georgii Kravchenko (Turkey) Sarp Ağabigün	(Romania) Sebastian Gima (United Kingdom) Paul Jubb (Turkey) Cengiz Aksu (Italy) Luciano Darderi
December 14	Monastir, Tunisia; Hard; M15; Singles and Doubles Draws	(Italy) Omar Giacalone; 6–3, 7–5	(Austria) Alexander Erler	(Tunisia) Skander Mansouri (Tunisia) Moez Echargui	(Argentina) Matías Franco Descotte (Russia) Artem Dubrivnyy (Italy) Luca Giacomini (Italy) Luca Potenza
December 14	Monastir, Tunisia; Hard; M15; Singles and Doubles Draws	(Austria) Alexander Erler (Austria) David Pichler; 7–6^{(9–7)}, 6–3	(France) Dan Added (Tunisia) Skander Mansouri	(Tunisia) Skander Mansouri (Tunisia) Moez Echargui	(Argentina) Matías Franco Descotte (Russia) Artem Dubrivnyy (Italy) Luca Giacomini (Italy) Luca Potenza
December 14	Antalya, Turkey; Clay; M15; Singles and Doubles Draws	(Ukraine) Vladyslav Orlov; 2–6, 6–3, 6–4	(Ukraine) Georgii Kravchenko	(Russia) Ivan Nedelko (Bosnia and Herzegovina) Nerman Fatić	(Ukraine) Oleksandr Ovcharenko (Argentina) Alejo Lorenzo Lingua Lavallén (Romania) Cezar Crețu (United Kingdom) Paul Jubb
December 14	Antalya, Turkey; Clay; M15; Singles and Doubles Draws	(Russia) Timur Kiyamov (Uzbekistan) Khumoyun Sultanov; 6–2, 7–6^{(7–5)}	(Italy) Luciano Darderi (Ukraine) Georgii Kravchenko	(Russia) Ivan Nedelko (Bosnia and Herzegovina) Nerman Fatić	(Ukraine) Oleksandr Ovcharenko (Argentina) Alejo Lorenzo Lingua Lavallén (Romania) Cezar Crețu (United Kingdom) Paul Jubb
December 21	Monastir, Tunisia; Hard; M15; Singles and Doubles Draws	(Tunisia) Skander Mansouri; 6–4, 7–6^{(7–3)}	(Japan) Kaichi Uchida	(France) Benjamin Pietri (Tunisia) Moez Echargui	(France) Nathan Seateun (France) Martin Breysach (Ukraine) Eric Vanshelboim (Austria) David Pichler
December 21	Monastir, Tunisia; Hard; M15; Singles and Doubles Draws	(Austria) Alexander Erler (Austria) David Pichler; 6–2, 6–2	(France) Constant de la Bassetière (United States) Alexander Kotzen	(France) Benjamin Pietri (Tunisia) Moez Echargui	(France) Nathan Seateun (France) Martin Breysach (Ukraine) Eric Vanshelboim (Austria) David Pichler
December 21	Antalya, Turkey; Clay; M15; Singles and Doubles Draws	(Ukraine) Georgii Kravchenko; 6–2, 6–3	(United Kingdom) Billy Harris	(Argentina) Alejo Lorenzo Lingua Lavallén (Ukraine) Vladyslav Orlov	(Turkey) Cengiz Aksu (Bulgaria) Alexandar Lazarov (Turkey) Marsel İlhan (Russia) Ivan Nedelko
December 21	Antalya, Turkey; Clay; M15; Singles and Doubles Draws	(Russia) Timur Kiyamov (Uzbekistan) Khumoyun Sultanov; 6–4, 6–3	(Turkey) Umut Akkoyun (Turkey) Mert Naci Türker	(Argentina) Alejo Lorenzo Lingua Lavallén (Ukraine) Vladyslav Orlov	(Turkey) Cengiz Aksu (Bulgaria) Alexandar Lazarov (Turkey) Marsel İlhan (Russia) Ivan Nedelko
December 28	Monastir, Tunisia; Hard; M15; Singles and Doubles Draws	(Japan) Kaichi Uchida; 6–4, 6–2	(Austria) Alexander Erler	(Austria) David Pichler (Tunisia) Skander Mansouri	(France) Nathan Seateun (Tunisia) Aziz Ouakaa (Ukraine) Eric Vanshelboim (Japan) Kento Takeuchi
December 28	Monastir, Tunisia; Hard; M15; Singles and Doubles Draws	(Austria) Alexander Erler (Austria) David Pichler; 6–4, 7–6^{(7–5)}	(France) Théo Arribagé (France) Benjamin Pietri	(Austria) David Pichler (Tunisia) Skander Mansouri	(France) Nathan Seateun (Tunisia) Aziz Ouakaa (Ukraine) Eric Vanshelboim (Japan) Kento Takeuchi
