= 2021 ITF Men's World Tennis Tour (January–March) =

The 2021 ITF Men's World Tennis Tour is the 2021 edition of the second-tier tour for men's professional tennis. It is organised by the International Tennis Federation and is a tier below the ATP Challenger Tour. The ITF Men's World Tennis Tour includes tournaments with prize money ranging from $15,000 to $25,000.

== Key ==
M25 tournaments
M15 tournaments

== Month ==
=== January ===
Week of	Tournament	Winner	Runners-up	Semifinalists	Quarterfinalists
January 4	Cairo, Egypt; Clay; M15; Singles and Doubles Draws	(Italy) Fabrizio Ornago; 7–6^{(7–5)}, 2–6, 6–4	(Spain) José Francisco Vidal Azorín	(Italy) Simone Roncalli (France) Maxence Beaugé	(Italy) Edoardo Lavagno (Poland) Mikołaj Lorens (Poland) Piotr Gryńkowski (France) Matthieu Perchicot
January 4	Cairo, Egypt; Clay; M15; Singles and Doubles Draws	(Argentina) Alejo Lorenzo Lingua Lavallén (Spain) Carlos Sánchez Jover; 6–1, 7–6^{(7–2)}	(Italy) Lorenzo Bocchi (Italy) Fabrizio Ornago	(Italy) Simone Roncalli (France) Maxence Beaugé	(Italy) Edoardo Lavagno (Poland) Mikołaj Lorens (Poland) Piotr Gryńkowski (France) Matthieu Perchicot
January 4	Manacor, Spain; Hard; M15; Singles and Doubles Draws	(Switzerland) Antoine Bellier; 7–6^{(9–7)}, 6–4	(France) Evan Furness	(France) Jules Okala (Spain) Daniel Rincón	(France) Antoine Cornut-Chauvinc (Spain) Alberto Barroso Campos (Latvia) Kārlis Ozoliņš (Czech Republic) Václav Šafránek
January 4	Manacor, Spain; Hard; M15; Singles and Doubles Draws	(France) Sadio Doumbia (France) Fabien Reboul; 7–6^{(7–1)}, 6–1	(France) Dan Added (Switzerland) Antoine Bellier	(France) Jules Okala (Spain) Daniel Rincón	(France) Antoine Cornut-Chauvinc (Spain) Alberto Barroso Campos (Latvia) Kārlis Ozoliņš (Czech Republic) Václav Šafránek
January 4	Monastir, Tunisia; Hard; M15; Singles and Doubles Draws	(Ukraine) Eric Vanshelboim; 3–6, 6–4, 6–3	(Tunisia) Skander Mansouri	(Japan) Kaichi Uchida (Poland) Wojciech Marek	(Austria) David Pichler (France) Ronan Joncour (France) Calvin Hemery (France) Axel Garcian
January 4	Monastir, Tunisia; Hard; M15; Singles and Doubles Draws	(France) Tom Jomby (France) Ronan Joncour; 6–7^{(6–8)}, 7–6^{(9–7)}, [10–7]	(Tunisia) Skander Mansouri (Austria) David Pichler	(Japan) Kaichi Uchida (Poland) Wojciech Marek	(Austria) David Pichler (France) Ronan Joncour (France) Calvin Hemery (France) Axel Garcian
January 4	Antalya, Turkey; Clay; M15; Singles and Doubles Draws	(United States) Toby Kodat; 6–4, 6–2	(France) Maxime Hamou	(Spain) Àlex Martí Pujolràs (Argentina) Pedro Cachin	(Russia) Ivan Nedelko (Russia) Alexander Shevchenko (Italy) Davide Galoppini (United Kingdom) Billy Harris
January 4	Antalya, Turkey; Clay; M15; Singles and Doubles Draws	(United Kingdom) Billy Harris (Russia) Yan Sabanin; 7–6^{(7–5)}, 6–0	(Bulgaria) Plamen Milushev (Bulgaria) Simeon Terziev	(Spain) Àlex Martí Pujolràs (Argentina) Pedro Cachin	(Russia) Ivan Nedelko (Russia) Alexander Shevchenko (Italy) Davide Galoppini (United Kingdom) Billy Harris
January 11	Cairo, Egypt; Clay; M15; Singles and Doubles Draws	(Spain) Carlos Sánchez Jover; 6–3, 6–0	(Argentina) Juan Pablo Paz	(Spain) Pol Toledo Bagué (Switzerland) Johan Nikles	(Romania) Filip Cristian Jianu (Japan) Naoki Tajima (France) Matthieu Perchicot (Italy) Simone Roncalli
January 11	Cairo, Egypt; Clay; M15; Singles and Doubles Draws	(Italy) Franco Agamenone (Poland) Piotr Matuszewski; 4–6, 7–6^{(7–5)}, [10–7]	(Japan) Naoki Tajima (Spain) José Francisco Vidal Azorín	(Spain) Pol Toledo Bagué (Switzerland) Johan Nikles	(Romania) Filip Cristian Jianu (Japan) Naoki Tajima (France) Matthieu Perchicot (Italy) Simone Roncalli
January 11	Manacor, Spain; Hard; M15; Singles and Doubles Draws	(France) Evan Furness; 6–2, 5–7, 6–0	(Denmark) Holger Vitus Nødskov Rune	(Germany) Tobias Simon (France) Dan Added	(France) Sadio Doumbia (France) Matteo Martineau (France) Baptiste Crepatte (France) Kenny de Schepper
January 11	Manacor, Spain; Hard; M15; Singles and Doubles Draws	(France) Matteo Martineau (France) Arthur Reymond; 7–5, 4–6, [10–7]	(Germany) Peter Heller (Belgium) Jeroen Vanneste	(Germany) Tobias Simon (France) Dan Added	(France) Sadio Doumbia (France) Matteo Martineau (France) Baptiste Crepatte (France) Kenny de Schepper
January 11	Monastir, Tunisia; Hard; M15; Singles and Doubles Draws	Tournament cancelled after the first round due to the lockdown measures applied in Tunisia caused by the coronavirus pandemic.			
January 11	Antalya, Turkey; Clay; M15; Singles and Doubles Draws	(Bulgaria) Adrian Andreev; 6–1, 7–6^{(7–1)}	(Russia) Alexander Shevchenko	(Spain) Àlex Martí Pujolràs (Uzbekistan) Sergey Fomin	(Turkey) Baran Cengiz (Italy) Federico Arnaboldi (Russia) Ivan Nedelko (Argentina) Pedro Cachin
January 11	Antalya, Turkey; Clay; M15; Singles and Doubles Draws	(Argentina) Pedro Cachin (Argentina) Juan Manuel Cerúndolo; 7–5, 6–2	(Ukraine) Vladyslav Orlov (Kazakhstan) Denis Yevseyev	(Spain) Àlex Martí Pujolràs (Uzbekistan) Sergey Fomin	(Turkey) Baran Cengiz (Italy) Federico Arnaboldi (Russia) Ivan Nedelko (Argentina) Pedro Cachin
January 18	Cairo, Egypt; Clay; M15; Singles and Doubles Draws	(Italy) Franco Agamenone; 7–6^{(7–0)}, 6–4	(Romania) Filip Cristian Jianu	(Argentina) Facundo Díaz Acosta (Argentina) Juan Pablo Paz	(Spain) Javier Barranco Cosano (Switzerland) Johan Nikles (Serbia) Miljan Zekić (Spain) Carlos Sánchez Jover
January 18	Cairo, Egypt; Clay; M15; Singles and Doubles Draws	(Spain) Gerard Granollers (Spain) Pol Toledo Bagué; 5–7, 6–3, [10–3]	(Russia) Ivan Gakhov (Austria) Lukas Krainer	(Argentina) Facundo Díaz Acosta (Argentina) Juan Pablo Paz	(Spain) Javier Barranco Cosano (Switzerland) Johan Nikles (Serbia) Miljan Zekić (Spain) Carlos Sánchez Jover
January 18	Bressuire, France; Hard (indoor); M15+H; Singles and Doubles Draws	(Denmark) Holger Vitus Nødskov Rune; 7–5, 4–6, 6–3	(France) Matteo Martineau	(Netherlands) Gijs Brouwer (Belgium) Zizou Bergs	(Germany) Benjamin Hassan (Netherlands) Igor Sijsling (Netherlands) Jelle Sels (France) Corentin Denolly
January 18	Bressuire, France; Hard (indoor); M15+H; Singles and Doubles Draws	(United States) Alafia Ayeni (United States) Roy Smith; 7–6^{(7–4)}, 4–6, [10–5]	(France) Kenny de Schepper (Italy) Stefano Napolitano	(Netherlands) Gijs Brouwer (Belgium) Zizou Bergs	(Germany) Benjamin Hassan (Netherlands) Igor Sijsling (Netherlands) Jelle Sels (France) Corentin Denolly
January 18	Antalya, Turkey; Clay; M15; Singles and Doubles Draws	(Italy) Giovanni Fonio; Walkover	(Argentina) Juan Manuel Cerúndolo	(Italy) Raúl Brancaccio (Portugal) Nuno Borges	(Germany) Rudolf Molleker (Ukraine) Vladyslav Orlov (Ecuador) Diego Hidalgo (Argentina) Pedro Cachin
January 18	Antalya, Turkey; Clay; M15; Singles and Doubles Draws	(Italy) Raúl Brancaccio (Italy) Davide Galoppini; 2–6, 6–4, [10–7]	(Portugal) Nuno Borges (United States) Alex Rybakov	(Italy) Raúl Brancaccio (Portugal) Nuno Borges	(Germany) Rudolf Molleker (Ukraine) Vladyslav Orlov (Ecuador) Diego Hidalgo (Argentina) Pedro Cachin
January 25	Cairo, Egypt; Clay; M15; Singles and Doubles Draws	(Chile) Gonzalo Lama; 6–0, 6–0	(United States) Nicolas Moreno de Alboran	(Argentina) Román Andrés Burruchaga (Austria) Lenny Hampel	(Argentina) Juan Bautista Torres (Japan) Rimpei Kawakami (Italy) Daniele Capecchi (Argentina) Alejo Lorenzo Lingua Lavallén
January 25	Cairo, Egypt; Clay; M15; Singles and Doubles Draws	(Italy) Franco Agamenone (Argentina) Hernán Casanova; 6–1, 6–4	(Japan) Ken Onishi (Japan) Jumpei Yamasaki	(Argentina) Román Andrés Burruchaga (Austria) Lenny Hampel	(Argentina) Juan Bautista Torres (Japan) Rimpei Kawakami (Italy) Daniele Capecchi (Argentina) Alejo Lorenzo Lingua Lavallén
January 25	Antalya, Turkey; Clay; M15; Singles and Doubles Draws	Singles and doubles competitions were abandoned due to poor weather		(Spain) Pol Martín Tiffon (Italy) Raúl Brancaccio (United States) Alex Rybakov (Portugal) Nuno Borges	(Argentina) Facundo Juárez (Bulgaria) Alexandar Lazarov (Ukraine) Georgii Kravchenko (Italy) Alexander Weis

=== February ===
Week of	Tournament	Winner	Runners-up	Semifinalists	Quarterfinalists
February 1	Villena, Spain; Hard; M25; Singles and Doubles Draws	(Portugal) Gastão Elias; 3–6, 6–2, 6–1	(Denmark) Holger Vitus Nødskov Rune	(United States) Jenson Brooksby (United States) Emilio Nava	(France) Dan Added (Czech Republic) Jiří Lehečka (Czech Republic) Jonáš Forejtek (France) Antoine Escoffier
February 1	Villena, Spain; Hard; M25; Singles and Doubles Draws	(France) Dan Added (India) Arjun Kadhe; 6–4, 6–2	(Spain) Íñigo Cervantes (Netherlands) Mark Vervoort	(United States) Jenson Brooksby (United States) Emilio Nava	(France) Dan Added (Czech Republic) Jiří Lehečka (Czech Republic) Jonáš Forejtek (France) Antoine Escoffier
February 1	Sharm El Sheikh, Egypt; Hard; M15; Singles and Doubles Draws	(Chinese Taipei) Hsu Yu-hsiou; 6–4, 6–4	(Belgium) Arnaud Bovy	(Czech Republic) Marek Gengel (Argentina) Facundo Díaz Acosta	(United States) Nicolas Moreno de Alboran (Switzerland) Sandro Ehrat (Hungary) Péter Fajta (Serbia) Marko Tepavac
February 1	Sharm El Sheikh, Egypt; Hard; M15; Singles and Doubles Draws	(Dominican Republic) Nick Hardt (United States) Nicolas Moreno de Alboran; 6–3, 6–4	(Belgium) Arnaud Bovy (United Kingdom) Aidan McHugh	(Czech Republic) Marek Gengel (Argentina) Facundo Díaz Acosta	(United States) Nicolas Moreno de Alboran (Switzerland) Sandro Ehrat (Hungary) Péter Fajta (Serbia) Marko Tepavac
February 1	Nur-Sultan, Kazakhstan; Hard (indoor); M15; Singles and Doubles Draws	(Finland) Otto Virtanen; 7–5, 6–3	(Germany) Mats Rosenkranz	(Georgia (country)) Aleksandre Metreveli (Poland) Michał Dembek	(Ukraine) Eric Vanshelboim (Italy) Riccardo Balzerani (Italy) Matteo Donati (Poland) Wojciech Marek
February 1	Nur-Sultan, Kazakhstan; Hard (indoor); M15; Singles and Doubles Draws	(Belarus) Ivan Liutarevich (Belarus) Yaraslav Shyla; 7–6^{(7–4)}, 7–6^{(7–4)}	(Italy) Francesco Forti (Italy) Francesco Maestrelli	(Georgia (country)) Aleksandre Metreveli (Poland) Michał Dembek	(Ukraine) Eric Vanshelboim (Italy) Riccardo Balzerani (Italy) Matteo Donati (Poland) Wojciech Marek
February 1	Saint Petersburg, Russia; Hard (indoor); M15; Singles and Doubles Draws	(Russia) Alibek Kachmazov; 6–4, 5–7, 6–4	(Russia) Alexey Zakharov	(United Kingdom) Jan Choinski (Russia) Konstantin Kravchuk	(Russia) Ivan Gakhov (Czech Republic) Martin Krumich (Moldova) Alexander Cozbinov (Russia) Bogdan Bobrov
February 1	Saint Petersburg, Russia; Hard (indoor); M15; Singles and Doubles Draws	(Czech Republic) Andrew Paulson (Czech Republic) Patrik Rikl; 4–6, 6–4, [10–8]	(Moldova) Alexander Cozbinov (Ukraine) Marat Deviatiarov	(United Kingdom) Jan Choinski (Russia) Konstantin Kravchuk	(Russia) Ivan Gakhov (Czech Republic) Martin Krumich (Moldova) Alexander Cozbinov (Russia) Bogdan Bobrov
February 1	Monastir, Tunisia; Hard; M15; Singles and Doubles Draws	(United Kingdom) Stuart Parker; 6–3, 4–6, 7–6^{(7–5)}	(Belgium) Yannick Mertens	(Slovenia) Tom Kočevar-Dešman (Tunisia) Moez Echargui	(Tunisia) Skander Mansouri (France) Pierre Faivre (Belgium) Raphaël Collignon (Tunisia) Aziz Dougaz
February 1	Monastir, Tunisia; Hard; M15; Singles and Doubles Draws	(Tunisia) Moez Echargui (France) Jean Thirouin; 7–5, 6–0	(Tunisia) Anis Ghorbel (Slovenia) Tom Kočevar-Dešman	(Slovenia) Tom Kočevar-Dešman (Tunisia) Moez Echargui	(Tunisia) Skander Mansouri (France) Pierre Faivre (Belgium) Raphaël Collignon (Tunisia) Aziz Dougaz
February 1	Antalya, Turkey; Clay; M15; Singles and Doubles Draws	(Portugal) Nuno Borges; 6–4, 3–3, ret.	(Serbia) Miljan Zekić	(Serbia) Hamad Međedović (Italy) Jacopo Berrettini	(Uzbekistan) Khumoyun Sultanov (Spain) Pol Martín Tiffon (Argentina) Facundo Juárez (Romania) Cezar Crețu
February 1	Antalya, Turkey; Clay; M15; Singles and Doubles Draws	(Portugal) Nuno Borges (United States) Alex Rybakov; 4–6, 7–6^{(7–1)}, [10–6]	(Italy) Jacopo Berrettini (Italy) Raúl Brancaccio	(Serbia) Hamad Međedović (Italy) Jacopo Berrettini	(Uzbekistan) Khumoyun Sultanov (Spain) Pol Martín Tiffon (Argentina) Facundo Juárez (Romania) Cezar Crețu
February 8	Sharm El Sheikh, Egypt; Hard; M15; Singles and Doubles Draws	(Czech Republic) Marek Gengel; 6–2, 6–2	(Czech Republic) Jan Šátral	(United States) Nicolas Moreno de Alboran (Czech Republic) Jiří Lehečka	(Hungary) Zsombor Piros (Cyprus) Petros Chrysochos (Serbia) Marko Tepavac (Italy) Erik Crepaldi
February 8	Sharm El Sheikh, Egypt; Hard; M15; Singles and Doubles Draws	(Japan) Shintaro Imai (Japan) Kaito Uesugi; 7–6^{(7–5)}, 6–4	(Chinese Taipei) Hsu Yu-hsiou (Japan) Jumpei Yamasaki	(United States) Nicolas Moreno de Alboran (Czech Republic) Jiří Lehečka	(Hungary) Zsombor Piros (Cyprus) Petros Chrysochos (Serbia) Marko Tepavac (Italy) Erik Crepaldi
February 8	Grenoble, France; Hard (indoor); M15; Singles and Doubles Draws	(France) Lucas Poullain; 6–4, 7–6^{(8–6)}	(Germany) Elmar Ejupovic	(Switzerland) Dominic Stricker (France) Kyrian Jacquet	(France) Johan Tatlot (France) Jurgen Briand (France) Arthur Reymond (France) Ugo Blanchet
February 8	Grenoble, France; Hard (indoor); M15; Singles and Doubles Draws	(Switzerland) Jakub Paul (Switzerland) Yannik Steinegger; 7–5, 6–1	(Switzerland) Luca Castelnuovo (Switzerland) Dominic Stricker	(Switzerland) Dominic Stricker (France) Kyrian Jacquet	(France) Johan Tatlot (France) Jurgen Briand (France) Arthur Reymond (France) Ugo Blanchet
February 8	Nur-Sultan, Kazakhstan; Hard (indoor); M15; Singles and Doubles Draws	(Poland) Michał Dembek; 6–3, 7–6^{(7–4)}	(Italy) Riccardo Balzerani	(Italy) Giacomo Dambrosi (Italy) Francesco Forti	(Kazakhstan) Denis Yevseyev (United Kingdom) Oscar Weightman (Belarus) Yaraslav Shyla (Germany) Mats Rosenkranz
February 8	Nur-Sultan, Kazakhstan; Hard (indoor); M15; Singles and Doubles Draws	(Belarus) Ivan Liutarevich (Belarus) Yaraslav Shyla; 6–4, 6–2	(Poland) Wojciech Marek (Poland) Yann Wójcik	(Italy) Giacomo Dambrosi (Italy) Francesco Forti	(Kazakhstan) Denis Yevseyev (United Kingdom) Oscar Weightman (Belarus) Yaraslav Shyla (Germany) Mats Rosenkranz
February 8	Saint Petersburg, Russia; Hard (indoor); M15; Singles and Doubles Draws	(Russia) Evgenii Tiurnev; 4–6, 7–5, 7–5	(Russia) Andrey Kuznetsov	(United Kingdom) Jan Choinski (Russia) Alexander Vasilenko	(Moldova) Alexander Cozbinov (Czech Republic) Patrik Rikl (Slovenia) Matic Špec (Czech Republic) Martin Krumich
February 8	Saint Petersburg, Russia; Hard (indoor); M15; Singles and Doubles Draws	(Czech Republic) Andrew Paulson (Czech Republic) Patrik Rikl; 3–6, 7–6^{(7–5)}, [10–2]	(Russia) Artem Dubrivnyy (Russia) Alexey Zakharov	(United Kingdom) Jan Choinski (Russia) Alexander Vasilenko	(Moldova) Alexander Cozbinov (Czech Republic) Patrik Rikl (Slovenia) Matic Špec (Czech Republic) Martin Krumich
February 8	Monastir, Tunisia; Hard; M15; Singles and Doubles Draws	(Belgium) Gauthier Onclin; 6–1, 6–4	(Austria) Alexander Erler	(Slovenia) Tom Kočevar-Dešman (Belgium) Yannick Mertens	(Tunisia) Skander Mansouri (France) Gabriel Petit (Argentina) Juan Bautista Torres (France) Benjamin Pietri
February 8	Monastir, Tunisia; Hard; M15; Singles and Doubles Draws	(Austria) Alexander Erler (Tunisia) Skander Mansouri; 6–0, 7–5	(Japan) Naoki Nakagawa (Japan) Ryota Tanuma	(Slovenia) Tom Kočevar-Dešman (Belgium) Yannick Mertens	(Tunisia) Skander Mansouri (France) Gabriel Petit (Argentina) Juan Bautista Torres (France) Benjamin Pietri
February 8	Antalya, Turkey; Clay; M15; Singles and Doubles Draws	(Argentina) Agustín Velotti; 6–3, 6–4	(Romania) Filip Cristian Jianu	(Argentina) Pedro Cachin (Italy) Federico Arnaboldi	(Uzbekistan) Khumoyun Sultanov (Bosnia and Herzegovina) Nerman Fatić (South Korea) Chung Yun-seong (Netherlands) Mick Veldheer
February 8	Antalya, Turkey; Clay; M15; Singles and Doubles Draws	(Argentina) Agustín Velotti (Argentina) Matías Zukas; 2–6, 7–5, [10–5]	(Colombia) Nicolás Mejía (Spain) Pedro Vives Marcos	(Argentina) Pedro Cachin (Italy) Federico Arnaboldi	(Uzbekistan) Khumoyun Sultanov (Bosnia and Herzegovina) Nerman Fatić (South Korea) Chung Yun-seong (Netherlands) Mick Veldheer
February 15	Naples, United States; Clay; M25; Singles and Doubles Draws	(France) Clément Tabur; 6–1, 1–6, 6–3	(United States) Christian Harrison	(United States) Mitchell Krueger (United States) Michael Redlicki	(Colombia) Alejandro González (United States) Sekou Bangoura (United States) Bjorn Fratangelo (France) Corentin Denolly
February 15	Naples, United States; Clay; M25; Singles and Doubles Draws	(United States) Hunter Johnson (United States) Yates Johnson; 6–1, 1–6, [12–10]	(Colombia) Alejandro Gómez (United States) Junior Alexander Ore	(United States) Mitchell Krueger (United States) Michael Redlicki	(Colombia) Alejandro González (United States) Sekou Bangoura (United States) Bjorn Fratangelo (France) Corentin Denolly
February 15	Sharm El Sheikh, Egypt; Hard; M15; Singles and Doubles Draws	(Czech Republic) Jiří Lehečka; 6–1, 6–3	(Poland) Paweł Ciaś	(Germany) Robert Strombachs (Chinese Taipei) Hsu Yu-hsiou	(Italy) Erik Crepaldi (Czech Republic) David Poljak (Czech Republic) Marek Gengel (Japan) Yusuke Takahashi
February 15	Sharm El Sheikh, Egypt; Hard; M15; Singles and Doubles Draws	(Chinese Taipei) Hsu Yu-hsiou (Japan) Jumpei Yamasaki; 6–3, 5–7, [10–7]	(Latvia) Mārtiņš Podžus (Germany) Robert Strombachs	(Germany) Robert Strombachs (Chinese Taipei) Hsu Yu-hsiou	(Italy) Erik Crepaldi (Czech Republic) David Poljak (Czech Republic) Marek Gengel (Japan) Yusuke Takahashi
February 15	Monastir, Tunisia; Hard; M15; Singles and Doubles Draws	(Tunisia) Aziz Dougaz; 6–1, 3–6, 6–3	(Belgium) Gauthier Onclin	(Austria) Alexander Erler (United States) Oliver Crawford	(Italy) Luca Giacomini (Spain) José Francisco Vidal Azorín (United Kingdom) Stuart Parker (Italy) Omar Giacalone
February 15	Monastir, Tunisia; Hard; M15; Singles and Doubles Draws	(Austria) Alexander Erler (Tunisia) Skander Mansouri; 6–2, 5–7, [11–9]	(France) Lilian Marmousez (France) Giovanni Mpetshi Perricard	(Austria) Alexander Erler (United States) Oliver Crawford	(Italy) Luca Giacomini (Spain) José Francisco Vidal Azorín (United Kingdom) Stuart Parker (Italy) Omar Giacalone
February 15	Antalya, Turkey; Clay; M15; Singles and Doubles Draws	(Argentina) Pedro Cachin; 6–1, 6–4	(Argentina) Matías Zukas	(Bulgaria) Gabriel Donev (Italy) Giovanni Fonio	(South Korea) Chung Yun-seong (Spain) Àlex Martí Pujolràs (Austria) David Pichler (Ukraine) Oleksii Krutykh
February 15	Antalya, Turkey; Clay; M15; Singles and Doubles Draws	(Argentina) Pedro Cachin (Argentina) Genaro Alberto Olivieri; 5–7, 6–1, [14–12]	(Colombia) Nicolás Mejía (Spain) Pedro Vives Marcos	(Bulgaria) Gabriel Donev (Italy) Giovanni Fonio	(South Korea) Chung Yun-seong (Spain) Àlex Martí Pujolràs (Austria) David Pichler (Ukraine) Oleksii Krutykh
February 22	Vale do Lobo, Portugal; Hard; M25; Singles and Doubles Draws	(France) Evan Furness; 6–2, 6–4	(Portugal) Gastão Elias	(France) Lucas Poullain (France) Antoine Escoffier	(Slovenia) Tomás Lipovšek Puches (Portugal) Pedro Araújo (Mexico) Luis Patiño (France) Kenny de Schepper
February 22	Vale do Lobo, Portugal; Hard; M25; Singles and Doubles Draws	(France) Dan Added (Germany) Fabian Fallert; 6–2, 6–7^{(4–7)}, [10–2]	(Russia) Alen Avidzba (Estonia) Kristjan Tamm	(France) Lucas Poullain (France) Antoine Escoffier	(Slovenia) Tomás Lipovšek Puches (Portugal) Pedro Araújo (Mexico) Luis Patiño (France) Kenny de Schepper
February 22	Naples, United States; Clay; M25; Singles and Doubles Draws	(United States) Christian Harrison; 6–4, 6–2	(France) Corentin Denolly	(Colombia) Cristian Rodríguez (Argentina) Gonzalo Villanueva	(United States) Mitchell Krueger (Colombia) Alejandro González (United States) Martin Damm (Ecuador) Diego Hidalgo
February 22	Naples, United States; Clay; M25; Singles and Doubles Draws	(Colombia) Alejandro Gómez (United States) Junior Alexander Ore; 6–4, 7–6^{(9–7)}	(Ecuador) Diego Hidalgo (Colombia) Cristian Rodríguez	(Colombia) Cristian Rodríguez (Argentina) Gonzalo Villanueva	(United States) Mitchell Krueger (Colombia) Alejandro González (United States) Martin Damm (Ecuador) Diego Hidalgo
February 22	Sharm El Sheikh, Egypt; Hard; M15; Singles and Doubles Draws	(United Kingdom) Paul Jubb; 6–2, 1–6, 6–2	(Latvia) Mārtiņš Podžus	(Germany) Robert Strombachs (Japan) Rio Noguchi	(Italy) Flavio Cobolli (Chinese Taipei) Hsu Yu-hsiou (Switzerland) Jakub Paul (Austria) Lukas Krainer
February 22	Sharm El Sheikh, Egypt; Hard; M15; Singles and Doubles Draws	(Chinese Taipei) Hsu Yu-hsiou (Japan) Shintaro Imai; 7–5, 6–4	(Japan) Yusuke Takahashi (Japan) Jumpei Yamasaki	(Germany) Robert Strombachs (Japan) Rio Noguchi	(Italy) Flavio Cobolli (Chinese Taipei) Hsu Yu-hsiou (Switzerland) Jakub Paul (Austria) Lukas Krainer
February 22	Monastir, Tunisia; Hard; M15; Singles and Doubles Draws	(United Kingdom) Stuart Parker; 3–6, 7–5, 6–3	(France) Alexis Gautier	(France) Lilian Marmousez (United States) Oliver Crawford	(Japan) Renta Tokuda (Austria) Alexander Erler (Italy) Daniele Capecchi (Italy) Omar Giacalone
February 22	Monastir, Tunisia; Hard; M15; Singles and Doubles Draws	(Poland) Daniel Michalski (Spain) Carlos Sánchez Jover; 6–4, 7–5	(Germany) Constantin Schmitz (Germany) Kai Wehnelt	(France) Lilian Marmousez (United States) Oliver Crawford	(Japan) Renta Tokuda (Austria) Alexander Erler (Italy) Daniele Capecchi (Italy) Omar Giacalone
February 22	Antalya, Turkey; Clay; M15; Singles and Doubles Draws	(Italy) Raúl Brancaccio; 6–4, 6–4	(Ukraine) Oleksii Krutykh	(Argentina) Matías Zukas (Argentina) Facundo Juárez	(Austria) Filip Misolic (Sweden) Dragoș Nicolae Mădăraș (Argentina) Juan Pablo Paz (Israel) Yshai Oliel
February 22	Antalya, Turkey; Clay; M15; Singles and Doubles Draws	(Netherlands) Max Houkes (Netherlands) Sidané Pontjodikromo; 7–5, 6–1	(South Korea) Chung Yun-seong (Ukraine) Oleksandr Ovcharenko	(Argentina) Matías Zukas (Argentina) Facundo Juárez	(Austria) Filip Misolic (Sweden) Dragoș Nicolae Mădăraș (Argentina) Juan Pablo Paz (Israel) Yshai Oliel

=== March ===
Week of	Tournament	Winner	Runners-up	Semifinalists	Quarterfinalists
March 1	Faro, Portugal; Hard; M25; Singles and Doubles Draws	(Russia) Alen Avidzba; 6–2, 6–2	(France) Lucas Poullain	(Germany) Mischa Zverev (France) Tak Khunn Wang	(Austria) Maximilian Neuchrist (Slovenia) Tomás Lipovšek Puches (France) Dan Added (France) Louis Dussin
March 1	Faro, Portugal; Hard; M25; Singles and Doubles Draws	(Turkey) Tuna Altuna (Portugal) Gonçalo Falcão; 6–3, 4–6, [10–6]	(France) Dan Added (France) Hugo Voljacques	(Germany) Mischa Zverev (France) Tak Khunn Wang	(Austria) Maximilian Neuchrist (Slovenia) Tomás Lipovšek Puches (France) Dan Added (France) Louis Dussin
March 1	Sharm El Sheikh, Egypt; Hard; M15; Singles and Doubles Draws	(Chinese Taipei) Hsu Yu-hsiou; 6–3, 6–2	(Italy) Edoardo Eremin	(Dominican Republic) Nick Hardt (India) Sasikumar Mukund	(United Kingdom) Jack Draper (Switzerland) Jakub Paul (Greece) Michail Pervolarakis (Latvia) Mārtiņš Podžus
March 1	Sharm El Sheikh, Egypt; Hard; M15; Singles and Doubles Draws	(Italy) Jacopo Berrettini (Italy) Luca Nardi; 6–3, 2–6, [10–7]	(Chinese Taipei) Hsu Yu-hsiou (Japan) Shintaro Imai	(Dominican Republic) Nick Hardt (India) Sasikumar Mukund	(United Kingdom) Jack Draper (Switzerland) Jakub Paul (Greece) Michail Pervolarakis (Latvia) Mārtiņš Podžus
March 1	Lucknow, India; Hard; M15; Singles and Doubles Draws	(United States) Zane Khan; 7–6^{(7–3)}, 6–3	(India) Saketh Myneni	(United Kingdom) Aidan McHugh (Ukraine) Eric Vanshelboim	(India) Siddharth Vishwakarma (United States) Oliver Crawford (Sweden) Jonathan Mridha (India) Sidharth Rawat
March 1	Lucknow, India; Hard; M15; Singles and Doubles Draws	(India) Yuki Bhambri (India) Saketh Myneni; 6–2, 6–3	(India) Vinayak Sharma Kaza (India) Vijay Sundar Prashanth	(United Kingdom) Aidan McHugh (Ukraine) Eric Vanshelboim	(India) Siddharth Vishwakarma (United States) Oliver Crawford (Sweden) Jonathan Mridha (India) Sidharth Rawat
March 1	Bratislava, Slovakia; Hard (indoor); M15; Singles and Doubles Draws	(Ukraine) Vitaliy Sachko; 6–1, 2–6, 7–6^{(7–3)}	(France) Jurgen Briand	(Czech Republic) Andrew Paulson (Hungary) Zsombor Piros	(France) Baptiste Crepatte (Czech Republic) Patrik Rikl (France) Kyrian Jacquet (Italy) Riccardo Balzerani
March 1	Bratislava, Slovakia; Hard (indoor); M15; Singles and Doubles Draws	(Poland) Michał Mikuła (Austria) Neil Oberleitner; 6–7^{(2–7)}, 6–3, [10–5]	(Poland) Michał Dembek (Ukraine) Vitaliy Sachko	(Czech Republic) Andrew Paulson (Hungary) Zsombor Piros	(France) Baptiste Crepatte (Czech Republic) Patrik Rikl (France) Kyrian Jacquet (Italy) Riccardo Balzerani
March 1	Monastir, Tunisia; Hard; M15; Singles and Doubles Draws	(Japan) Renta Tokuda; 7–5, 5–7, 6–4	(Spain) Carlos Sánchez Jover	(United Kingdom) Stuart Parker (Brazil) Mateus Alves	(Italy) Daniele Capecchi (Republic of Ireland) Simon Carr (Italy) Enrico Dalla Valle (Italy) Franco Agamenone
March 1	Monastir, Tunisia; Hard; M15; Singles and Doubles Draws	(Japan) Naoki Nakagawa (Japan) Ryota Tanuma; 6–1, 6–3	(Republic of Ireland) Simon Carr (United States) Alexander Kotzen	(United Kingdom) Stuart Parker (Brazil) Mateus Alves	(Italy) Daniele Capecchi (Republic of Ireland) Simon Carr (Italy) Enrico Dalla Valle (Italy) Franco Agamenone
March 1	Antalya, Turkey; Clay; M15; Singles and Doubles Draws	(Sweden) Dragoș Nicolae Mădăraș; 2–6, 7–6^{(8–6)}, 6–5, ret.	(Serbia) Miljan Zekić	(Brazil) João Lucas Reis da Silva (Ukraine) Oleksii Krutykh	(Romania) Sebastian Gima (Germany) Peter Heller (France) Mathys Erhard (Italy) Raúl Brancaccio
March 1	Antalya, Turkey; Clay; M15; Singles and Doubles Draws	(Italy) Raúl Brancaccio (Argentina) Matías Zukas; 7–5, 7–5	(Brazil) Matheus Pucinelli de Almeida (Brazil) João Lucas Reis da Silva	(Brazil) João Lucas Reis da Silva (Ukraine) Oleksii Krutykh	(Romania) Sebastian Gima (Germany) Peter Heller (France) Mathys Erhard (Italy) Raúl Brancaccio
March 8	Vale do Lobo, Portugal; Hard; M25; Singles and Doubles Draws	(Japan) Kaichi Uchida; 5–7, 7–6^{(7–3)}, 7–6^{(7–5)}	(Germany) Sebastian Fanselow	(France) Kenny de Schepper (France) Tak Khunn Wang	(France) Louis Dussin (Austria) Maximilian Neuchrist (Portugal) Pedro Araújo (Portugal) Francisco Cabral
March 8	Vale do Lobo, Portugal; Hard; M25; Singles and Doubles Draws	(France) Kenny de Schepper (France) Quentin Robert; 0–6, 6–4, [10–6]	(France) Antoine Escoffier (France) Hugo Voljacques	(France) Kenny de Schepper (France) Tak Khunn Wang	(France) Louis Dussin (Austria) Maximilian Neuchrist (Portugal) Pedro Araújo (Portugal) Francisco Cabral
March 8	Trimbach, Switzerland; Carpet (indoor); M25; Singles and Doubles Draws	(Netherlands) Gijs Brouwer; 7–5, 6–0	(Germany) Elmar Ejupovic	(Switzerland) Antoine Bellier (France) Matteo Martineau	(Italy) Fabrizio Ornago (Switzerland) Dominic Stricker (Austria) Alexander Erler (Switzerland) Jakub Paul
March 8	Trimbach, Switzerland; Carpet (indoor); M25; Singles and Doubles Draws	(Switzerland) Jakub Paul (Switzerland) Yannik Steinegger; 6–3, 7–5	(Germany) Elmar Ejupovic (Austria) Alexander Erler	(Switzerland) Antoine Bellier (France) Matteo Martineau	(Italy) Fabrizio Ornago (Switzerland) Dominic Stricker (Austria) Alexander Erler (Switzerland) Jakub Paul
March 8	Poreč, Croatia; Clay; M15; Singles and Doubles Draws	(Austria) Filip Misolic; 6–4, 6–4	(Italy) Pietro Rondoni	(United States) Alex Rybakov (Switzerland) Damien Wenger	(Czech Republic) Pavel Nejedlý (Germany) Sebastian Prechtel (Bulgaria) Alexandar Lazarov (Italy) Matteo Arnaldi
March 8	Poreč, Croatia; Clay; M15; Singles and Doubles Draws	(Italy) Marco Bortolotti (Italy) Giovanni Fonio; 6–2, 6–2	(Hungary) Gergely Madarász (Hungary) Péter Nagy	(United States) Alex Rybakov (Switzerland) Damien Wenger	(Czech Republic) Pavel Nejedlý (Germany) Sebastian Prechtel (Bulgaria) Alexandar Lazarov (Italy) Matteo Arnaldi
March 8	Sharm El Sheikh, Egypt; Hard; M15; Singles and Doubles Draws	(Chinese Taipei) Hsu Yu-hsiou; 6–2, 6–1	(Austria) Lukas Krainer	(China) Li Hanwen (Cyprus) Petros Chrysochos	(Bosnia and Herzegovina) Aldin Šetkić (Ukraine) Illya Beloborodko (Czech Republic) Marek Gengel (India) Sasikumar Mukund
March 8	Sharm El Sheikh, Egypt; Hard; M15; Singles and Doubles Draws	(Italy) Jacopo Berrettini (Italy) Francesco Vilardo; 6–2, 6–7^{(1–7)}, [10–8]	(Austria) Lucas Miedler (Bosnia and Herzegovina) Aldin Šetkić	(China) Li Hanwen (Cyprus) Petros Chrysochos	(Bosnia and Herzegovina) Aldin Šetkić (Ukraine) Illya Beloborodko (Czech Republic) Marek Gengel (India) Sasikumar Mukund
March 8	Indore, India; Hard; M15; Singles and Doubles Draws	(United States) Zane Khan; 6–7^{(8–10)}, 7–6^{(8–6)}, 7–6^{(7–4)}	(United Kingdom) Aidan McHugh	(Italy) Marco Brugnerotto (Ukraine) Eric Vanshelboim	(Sweden) Filip Bergevi (Switzerland) Luca Castelnuovo (Italy) Lorenzo Bocchi (India) Manish Sureshkumar
March 8	Indore, India; Hard; M15; Singles and Doubles Draws	(Switzerland) Luca Castelnuovo (Ukraine) Eric Vanshelboim; 2–6, 7–5, [11–9]	(United Kingdom) Jonathan Binding (United Kingdom) Henry Patten	(Italy) Marco Brugnerotto (Ukraine) Eric Vanshelboim	(Sweden) Filip Bergevi (Switzerland) Luca Castelnuovo (Italy) Lorenzo Bocchi (India) Manish Sureshkumar
March 8	Kazan, Russia; Hard (indoor); M15; Singles and Doubles Draws	(Turkey) Yankı Erel; 6–3, 3–0, ret.	(Russia) Alexey Zakharov	(Russia) Alibek Kachmazov (Russia) Evgeny Philippov	(Russia) Alexandr Binda (Russia) Ivan Gakhov (Uzbekistan) Sanjar Fayziev (Uzbekistan) Sergey Fomin
March 8	Kazan, Russia; Hard (indoor); M15; Singles and Doubles Draws	(Belarus) Ivan Liutarevich (Belarus) Yaraslav Shyla; 4–6, 7–5, [10–7]	(Russia) Mikhail Fufygin (Russia) Boris Pokotilov	(Russia) Alibek Kachmazov (Russia) Evgeny Philippov	(Russia) Alexandr Binda (Russia) Ivan Gakhov (Uzbekistan) Sanjar Fayziev (Uzbekistan) Sergey Fomin
March 8	Bratislava, Slovakia; Hard (indoor); M15; Singles and Doubles Draws	(Hungary) Fábián Marozsán; 6–2, 3–0, ret.	(France) Jonathan Eysseric	(France) Jurgen Briand (Poland) Michał Dembek	(France) Kyrian Jacquet (Czech Republic) Andrew Paulson (Czech Republic) Patrik Rikl (Poland) Aleksander Orlikowski
March 8	Bratislava, Slovakia; Hard (indoor); M15; Singles and Doubles Draws	(Romania) Victor Vlad Cornea (France) Jonathan Eysseric; 7–6^{(7–3)}, 6–1	(Slovakia) Matej Gálik (Slovakia) Karol Miloš	(France) Jurgen Briand (Poland) Michał Dembek	(France) Kyrian Jacquet (Czech Republic) Andrew Paulson (Czech Republic) Patrik Rikl (Poland) Aleksander Orlikowski
March 8	La Nucia, Spain; Clay; M15; Singles and Doubles Draws	(United States) Emilio Nava; 7–6^{(10–8)}, 7–5	(Spain) Nikolás Sánchez Izquierdo	(Spain) Pol Martín Tiffon (Spain) Pablo Llamas Ruiz	(Spain) Javier Barranco Cosano (Spain) Pol Toledo Bagué (Ukraine) Georgii Kravchenko (Sweden) Markus Eriksson
March 8	La Nucia, Spain; Clay; M15; Singles and Doubles Draws	(Italy) Raúl Brancaccio (Spain) Sergi Pérez Contri; 6–3, 6–4	(Spain) Carlos Sánchez Jover (Spain) Jose Francisco Vidal Azorín	(Spain) Pol Martín Tiffon (Spain) Pablo Llamas Ruiz	(Spain) Javier Barranco Cosano (Spain) Pol Toledo Bagué (Ukraine) Georgii Kravchenko (Sweden) Markus Eriksson
March 8	Monastir, Tunisia; Hard; M15; Singles and Doubles Draws	(Japan) Naoki Nakagawa; 7–6^{(7–3)}, 6–4	(Italy) Franco Agamenone	(Argentina) Juan Bautista Torres (Italy) Luca Giacomini	(United Kingdom) Stuart Parker (Republic of Ireland) Simon Carr (Japan) Renta Tokuda (Germany) Kai Wehnelt
March 8	Monastir, Tunisia; Hard; M15; Singles and Doubles Draws	(Italy) Daniele Capecchi (Italy) Samuele Pieri; 6–7^{(6–8)}, 6–4, [10–4]	(Romania) Vladislav Melnic (Northern Mariana Islands) Colin Sinclair	(Argentina) Juan Bautista Torres (Italy) Luca Giacomini	(United Kingdom) Stuart Parker (Republic of Ireland) Simon Carr (Japan) Renta Tokuda (Germany) Kai Wehnelt
March 8	Antalya, Turkey; Clay; M15; Singles and Doubles Draws	(Brazil) Matheus Pucinelli de Almeida; 6–4, 6–4	(Serbia) Miljan Zekić	(Romania) Dragoș Dima (Germany) Peter Heller	(Russia) Vladimir Korolev (Ukraine) Oleksandr Ovcharenko (Romania) Nicolae Frunză (Turkey) Ergi Kırkın
March 8	Antalya, Turkey; Clay; M15; Singles and Doubles Draws	(Ukraine) Oleksii Krutykh (Argentina) Juan Pablo Paz; 7–5, 4–6, [10–7]	(Germany) Peter Heller (Belgium) Jeroen Vanneste	(Romania) Dragoș Dima (Germany) Peter Heller	(Russia) Vladimir Korolev (Ukraine) Oleksandr Ovcharenko (Romania) Nicolae Frunză (Turkey) Ergi Kırkın
March 15	La Nucia, Spain; Clay; M25; Singles and Doubles Draws	(Argentina) Pedro Cachin; 7–6^{(7–2)}, 6–0	(Ukraine) Georgii Kravchenko	(France) Arthur Fils (Spain) Àlex Martí Pujolràs	(Spain) Carlos Gimeno Valero (Italy) Raúl Brancaccio (Spain) Javier Barranco Cosano (Spain) José Francisco Vidal Azorín
March 15	La Nucia, Spain; Clay; M25; Singles and Doubles Draws	(Russia) Yan Bondarevskiy (Ukraine) Oleg Prihodko; 6–3, 6–3	(Spain) Javier Barranco Cosano (Italy) Raúl Brancaccio	(France) Arthur Fils (Spain) Àlex Martí Pujolràs	(Spain) Carlos Gimeno Valero (Italy) Raúl Brancaccio (Spain) Javier Barranco Cosano (Spain) José Francisco Vidal Azorín
March 15	Rovinj, Croatia; Clay; M15; Singles and Doubles Draws	(France) Corentin Denolly; 3–6, 7–5, 6–0	(United States) Martin Damm	(Italy) Francesco Passaro (Italy) Giovanni Fonio	(Czech Republic) Pavel Nejedlý (France) Timo Legout (Italy) Andrea Basso (Austria) David Pichler
March 15	Rovinj, Croatia; Clay; M15; Singles and Doubles Draws	(Italy) Marco Bortolotti (Romania) Victor Vlad Cornea; 3–6, 6–3, [10–5]	(Croatia) Zvonimir Babić (Croatia) Josip Krstanović	(Italy) Francesco Passaro (Italy) Giovanni Fonio	(Czech Republic) Pavel Nejedlý (France) Timo Legout (Italy) Andrea Basso (Austria) David Pichler
March 15	Sharm El Sheikh, Egypt; Hard; M15; Singles and Doubles Draws	(Austria) Lucas Miedler; 6–3, 7–6^{(7–3)}	(Japan) Makoto Ochi	(Czech Republic) David Poljak (Chinese Taipei) Hsu Yu-hsiou	(Cyprus) Petros Chrysochos (Sweden) Arvid Nordquist (Czech Republic) Marek Gengel (Poland) Mikołaj Lorens
March 15	Sharm El Sheikh, Egypt; Hard; M15; Singles and Doubles Draws	(Italy) Jacopo Berrettini (Austria) Neil Oberleitner; 6–3, 6–3	(Japan) Takuto Niki (Japan) Yusuke Takahashi	(Czech Republic) David Poljak (Chinese Taipei) Hsu Yu-hsiou	(Cyprus) Petros Chrysochos (Sweden) Arvid Nordquist (Czech Republic) Marek Gengel (Poland) Mikołaj Lorens
March 15	Poitiers, France; Hard (indoor); M15; Singles and Doubles Draws	(France) Lucas Poullain; 6–2, 2–6, 6–2	(United Kingdom) George Loffhagen	(France) Jaimee Floyd Angele (France) Kyrian Jacquet	(Israel) Edan Leshem (France) Kenny de Schepper (France) Martin Breysach (Germany) Marvin Möller
March 15	Poitiers, France; Hard (indoor); M15; Singles and Doubles Draws	(Netherlands) Gijs Brouwer (Netherlands) Mick Veldheer; 6–3, 6–7^{(4–7)}, [10–4]	(France) Lucas Poullain (France) Vincent Stouff	(France) Jaimee Floyd Angele (France) Kyrian Jacquet	(Israel) Edan Leshem (France) Kenny de Schepper (France) Martin Breysach (Germany) Marvin Möller
March 15	Monastir, Tunisia; Hard; M15; Singles and Doubles Draws	(Belgium) Gauthier Onclin; 6–1, 6–1	(Belgium) Raphaël Collignon	(Russia) Savva Polukhin (Brazil) Igor Marcondes	(United States) Christian Langmo (France) Yanais Laurent (United States) Alexander Kotzen (Italy) Luca Giacomini
March 15	Monastir, Tunisia; Hard; M15; Singles and Doubles Draws	(Tunisia) Anis Ghorbel (Italy) Luca Potenza; 6–4, 6–1	(Brazil) Mateus Alves (Brazil) Igor Marcondes	(Russia) Savva Polukhin (Brazil) Igor Marcondes	(United States) Christian Langmo (France) Yanais Laurent (United States) Alexander Kotzen (Italy) Luca Giacomini
March 15	Antalya, Turkey; Clay; M15; Singles and Doubles Draws	(Serbia) Miljan Zekić; 6–1, 3–6, 6–4	(Brazil) Matheus Pucinelli de Almeida	(Hungary) Máté Valkusz (Germany) Peter Heller	(Spain) Pedro Vives Marcos (Argentina) Juan Pablo Paz (Romania) Nicholas David Ionel (South Korea) Hong Seong-chan
March 15	Antalya, Turkey; Clay; M15; Singles and Doubles Draws	(Germany) Peter Heller (Belgium) Jeroen Vanneste; 6–1, 6–1	(Italy) Federico Bertuccioli (Netherlands) Guy den Heijer	(Hungary) Máté Valkusz (Germany) Peter Heller	(Spain) Pedro Vives Marcos (Argentina) Juan Pablo Paz (Romania) Nicholas David Ionel (South Korea) Hong Seong-chan
March 22	Opatija, Croatia; Clay; M15; Singles and Doubles Draws	(Italy) Giovanni Fonio; 6–2, 6–3	(Italy) Giacomo Dambrosi	(France) Corentin Denolly (Ukraine) Oleksandr Ovcharenko	(Czech Republic) Pavel Nejedlý (United States) Alex Rybakov (Italy) Davide Galoppini (Italy) Pietro Rondoni
March 22	Opatija, Croatia; Clay; M15; Singles and Doubles Draws	(United States) Martin Damm (United States) Alex Rybakov; 7–6^{(7–4)}, 4–6, [10–7]	(Croatia) Alen Rogić Hadžalić (Slovenia) Matic Špec	(France) Corentin Denolly (Ukraine) Oleksandr Ovcharenko	(Czech Republic) Pavel Nejedlý (United States) Alex Rybakov (Italy) Davide Galoppini (Italy) Pietro Rondoni
March 22	Sharm El Sheikh, Egypt; Hard; M15; Singles and Doubles Draws	(Chinese Taipei) Hsu Yu-hsiou; 6–2, 6–1	(Japan) Makoto Ochi	(Czech Republic) Marek Gengel (Italy) Marcello Serafini	(Poland) Paweł Ciaś (Cyprus) Petros Chrysochos (Czech Republic) David Poljak (Brazil) Oscar José Gutierrez
March 22	Sharm El Sheikh, Egypt; Hard; M15; Singles and Doubles Draws	(Netherlands) Ryan Nijboer (Austria) Neil Oberleitner; 6–0, 5–7, [10–6]	(Ukraine) Marat Deviatiarov (Ukraine) Volodymyr Uzhylovskyi	(Czech Republic) Marek Gengel (Italy) Marcello Serafini	(Poland) Paweł Ciaś (Cyprus) Petros Chrysochos (Czech Republic) David Poljak (Brazil) Oscar José Gutierrez
March 22	Pune, India; Hard; M15; Singles and Doubles Draws	(United States) Oliver Crawford; 6–3, 6–0	(United States) Zane Khan	(India) Manish Sureshkumar (Sweden) Jonathan Mridha	(United Kingdom) Henry Patten (India) Arjun Kadhe (United Kingdom) Aidan McHugh (Republic of Ireland) Simon Carr
March 22	Pune, India; Hard; M15; Singles and Doubles Draws	(Switzerland) Luca Castelnuovo (India) Arjun Kadhe; 6–4, 7–5	(United States) Alexander Kotzen (Republic of Ireland) Simon Carr	(India) Manish Sureshkumar (Sweden) Jonathan Mridha	(United Kingdom) Henry Patten (India) Arjun Kadhe (United Kingdom) Aidan McHugh (Republic of Ireland) Simon Carr
March 22	Monastir, Tunisia; Hard; M15; Singles and Doubles Draws	(Monaco) Lucas Catarina; 6–7^{(3–7)}, 7–5, 6–4	(Brazil) Mateus Alves	(Tunisia) Aziz Dougaz (Northern Mariana Islands) Colin Sinclair	(Japan) Renta Tokuda (Turkey) Ergi Kırkın (Brazil) Jordan Correia (United States) Christian Langmo
March 22	Monastir, Tunisia; Hard; M15; Singles and Doubles Draws	(Romania) Vladislav Melnic (Northern Mariana Islands) Colin Sinclair; 6–3, 4–6, [10–6]	(Japan) Kazuma Kawachi (United States) Evan Zhu	(Tunisia) Aziz Dougaz (Northern Mariana Islands) Colin Sinclair	(Japan) Renta Tokuda (Turkey) Ergi Kırkın (Brazil) Jordan Correia (United States) Christian Langmo
March 22	Antalya, Turkey; Clay; M15; Singles and Doubles Draws	(Serbia) Miljan Zekić; 7–6^{(8–6)}, 6–3	(Poland) Daniel Michalski	(Sweden) Dragoș Nicolae Mădăraș (Ukraine) Georgii Kravchenko	(Romania) Sebastian Gima (Hungary) Fábián Marozsán (Italy) Luca Tomasetto (Uzbekistan) Sanjar Fayziev
March 22	Antalya, Turkey; Clay; M15; Singles and Doubles Draws	(Uzbekistan) Sanjar Fayziev (Greece) Markos Kalovelonis; 5–7, 7–6^{(7–3)}, [10–7]	(Romania) Vlad Andrei Dancu (Bulgaria) Gabriel Donev	(Sweden) Dragoș Nicolae Mădăraș (Ukraine) Georgii Kravchenko	(Romania) Sebastian Gima (Hungary) Fábián Marozsán (Italy) Luca Tomasetto (Uzbekistan) Sanjar Fayziev
March 29	Biel/Bienne, Switzerland; Hard (indoor); M25; Singles and Doubles Draws	(Netherlands) Tim van Rijthoven; 6–2, 6–1	(Czech Republic) Jiří Lehečka	(Finland) Otto Virtanen (Switzerland) Sandro Ehrat	(France) Antoine Escoffier (France) Arthur Cazaux (France) Alexis Gautier (France) Dan Added
March 29	Biel/Bienne, Switzerland; Hard (indoor); M25; Singles and Doubles Draws	(Austria) Alexander Erler (Austria) Maximilian Neuchrist; 6–3, 4–6, [10–2]	(Switzerland) Jakub Paul (Switzerland) Yannik Steinegger	(Finland) Otto Virtanen (Switzerland) Sandro Ehrat	(France) Antoine Escoffier (France) Arthur Cazaux (France) Alexis Gautier (France) Dan Added
March 29	Villa María, Argentina; Clay; M15; Singles and Doubles Draws	(Argentina) Nicolás Kicker; 6–3, 6–4	(Argentina) Camilo Ugo Carabelli	(Argentina) Santiago Rodríguez Taverna (Argentina) Hernán Casanova	(Peru) Conner Huertas del Pino (Chile) Gonzalo Lama (Brazil) Matheus Pucinelli de Almeida (Argentina) Mariano Kestelboim
March 29	Villa María, Argentina; Clay; M15; Singles and Doubles Draws	(Argentina) Mateo Nicolás Martínez (Argentina) Gonzalo Villanueva; 6–3, 6–3	(Brazil) Matheus Pucinelli de Almeida (Brazil) João Lucas Reis da Silva	(Argentina) Santiago Rodríguez Taverna (Argentina) Hernán Casanova	(Peru) Conner Huertas del Pino (Chile) Gonzalo Lama (Brazil) Matheus Pucinelli de Almeida (Argentina) Mariano Kestelboim
March 29	Sharm El Sheikh, Egypt; Hard; M15; Singles and Doubles Draws	(Cyprus) Petros Chrysochos; 6–0, 6–2	(Italy) Mattia Bellucci	(Netherlands) Ryan Nijboer (Italy) Alessandro Bega	(Japan) Makoto Ochi (Czech Republic) David Poljak (Bosnia and Herzegovina) Aldin Šetkić (United Kingdom) Paul Jubb
March 29	Sharm El Sheikh, Egypt; Hard; M15; Singles and Doubles Draws	(Netherlands) Ryan Nijboer (Austria) Neil Oberleitner; Walkover	(Brazil) Oscar José Gutierrez (China) Li Hanwen	(Netherlands) Ryan Nijboer (Italy) Alessandro Bega	(Japan) Makoto Ochi (Czech Republic) David Poljak (Bosnia and Herzegovina) Aldin Šetkić (United Kingdom) Paul Jubb
March 29	New Delhi, India; Hard; M15; Singles and Doubles Draws	(India) Niki Kaliyanda Poonacha; 6–3, 7–6^{(7–5)}	(United States) Oliver Crawford	(Czech Republic) Dalibor Svrčina (Republic of Ireland) Simon Carr	(Italy) Lorenzo Bocchi (United Kingdom) Aidan McHugh (United States) Alexander Kotzen (Hungary) Zsombor Velcz
March 29	New Delhi, India; Hard; M15; Singles and Doubles Draws	(India) Arjun Kadhe (India) Saketh Myneni; Walkover	(Czech Republic) Dalibor Svrčina (Hungary) Zsombor Velcz	(Czech Republic) Dalibor Svrčina (Republic of Ireland) Simon Carr	(Italy) Lorenzo Bocchi (United Kingdom) Aidan McHugh (United States) Alexander Kotzen (Hungary) Zsombor Velcz
March 29	Monastir, Tunisia; Hard; M15; Singles and Doubles Draws	(Tunisia) Aziz Dougaz; 6–3, 6–4	(Italy) Franco Agamenone	(Italy) Luca Potenza (Brazil) Igor Marcondes	(Brazil) Mateus Alves (Japan) Sho Shimabukuro (Spain) Alberto Barroso Campos (Russia) Alen Avidzba
March 29	Monastir, Tunisia; Hard; M15; Singles and Doubles Draws	(Tunisia) Aziz Dougaz (Zimbabwe) Benjamin Lock; 7–6^{(7–2)}, 3–6, [11–9]	(Italy) Franco Agamenone (Poland) Piotr Matuszewski	(Italy) Luca Potenza (Brazil) Igor Marcondes	(Brazil) Mateus Alves (Japan) Sho Shimabukuro (Spain) Alberto Barroso Campos (Russia) Alen Avidzba
March 29	Antalya, Turkey; Clay; M15; Singles and Doubles Draws	(South Korea) Hong Seong-chan; 6–1, 6–3	(Uzbekistan) Sanjar Fayziev	(Germany) Benjamin Hassan (Spain) Pol Martín Tiffon	(Italy) Flavio Cobolli (Spain) Pablo Llamas Ruiz (Sweden) Dragoș Nicolae Mădăraș (Italy) Matteo Gigante
March 29	Antalya, Turkey; Clay; M15; Singles and Doubles Draws	(Germany) Benjamin Hassan (Germany) Constantin Schmitz; 6–2, 6–1	(Spain) Pablo Llamas Ruiz (Spain) Pedro Vives Marcos	(Germany) Benjamin Hassan (Spain) Pol Martín Tiffon	(Italy) Flavio Cobolli (Spain) Pablo Llamas Ruiz (Sweden) Dragoș Nicolae Mădăraș (Italy) Matteo Gigante
