= Dragoș Nicolae Mădăraș =

Romanian-born Swedish tennis player (born 1997)

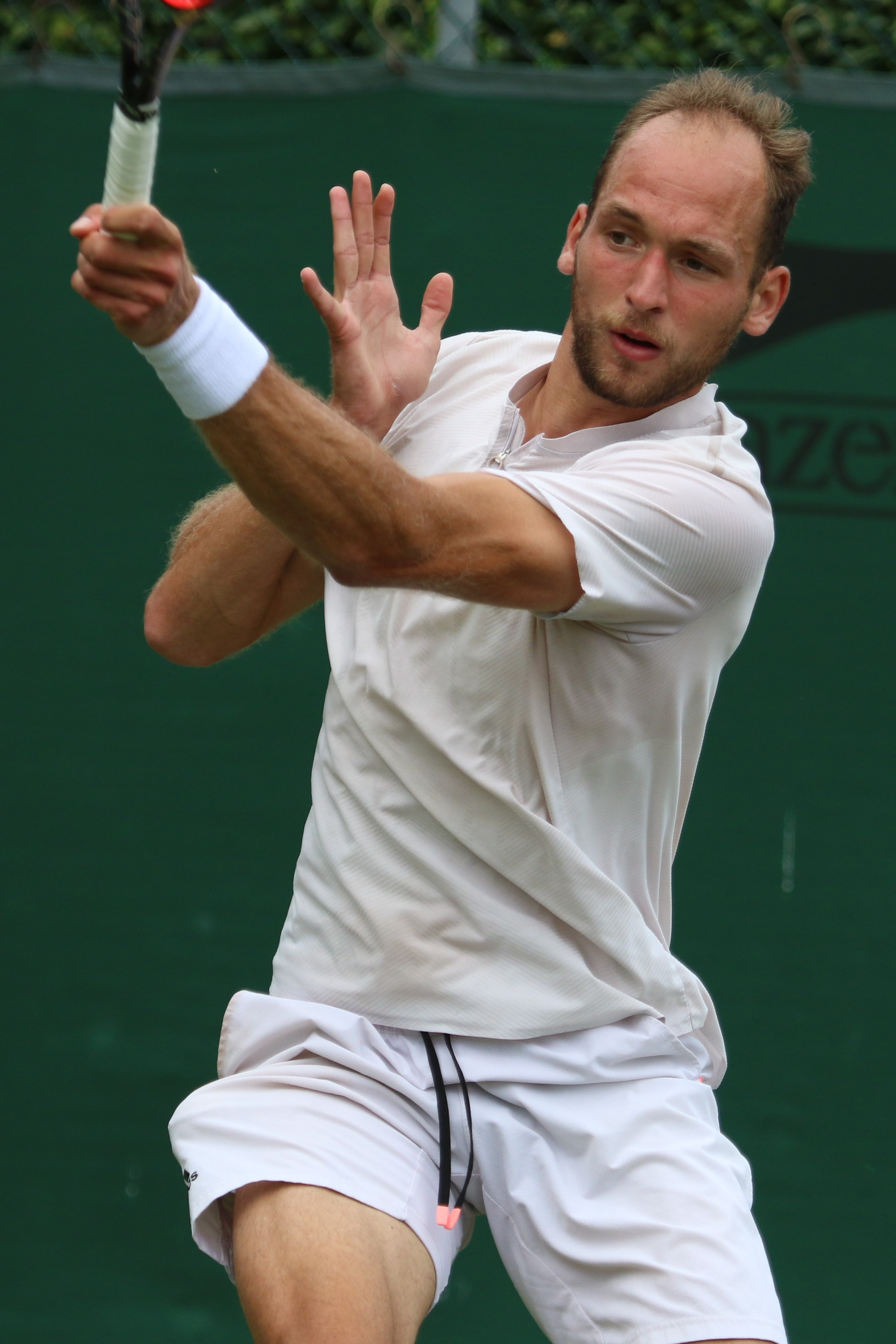
- Mădăraș at the 2023 Wimbledon Championships
- Country (sports): Sweden (2016–present); Romania (2013–2015)
- Born: 12 September 1997 (age 29) Deva, Romania
- Height: 1.91 m (6 ft 3 in)
- Plays: Left-handed (two-handed backhand)
- Prize money: US $200,597

Singles
- Career record: 0–5
- Career titles: 0
- Highest ranking: No. 191 (17 July 2023)
- Current ranking: No. 497 (14 September 2026)

Grand Slam singles results
- Wimbledon: Q2 (2023)

Doubles
- Career record: 0–2
- Career titles: 0
- Highest ranking: No. 420 (14 August 2023)
- Current ranking: No. 956 (14 September 2026)
- Last updated on: 16 September 2026.

Dragoș Nicolae Mădăraș (born 12 September 1997) is a Romanian-born Swedish professional tennis player. He has a career-high ATP singles ranking of No. 191 achieved on 17 July 2023 and a best doubles ranking of No. 420 reached on 14 August 2023. He plays mostly on ITF Men's Tour.

Mădăraș was temporarily banned from the sport for breaking anti-corruption rules. He returned to professional circuit in 2025.

== Career ==
=== 2022: ATP debut ===
He made his ATP debut at the 2022 Sofia Open as a qualifier where he lost to Oscar Otte in the first round.

=== 2023: ITF success and provisional ban ===
Mădăraș first half of the season led him to winning a record-breaking of 10 ITF titles in one season.

However, on 17 August 2023 he was provisionally suspended from all tennis by the International Tennis Integrity Agency (ITIA) after failing to comply with the anti-corruption rules.

=== 2024: Suspension from professional tennis ===
On 14 March 2024 the ITIA revealed the final verdict (four years and five months suspension) and the details of the incident that had led up to the ban. At the 2023 Wimbledon qualifying tournament, Mădăraș had refused to hand over a mobile telephone to ITIA investigators who wanted to examine it. Instead he gave the phone to his brother who ran away with it. It was also revealed Mădăraș had previously been under investigation for match-fixing by the ITIA in the years 2017–2020.

=== 2025: Appeal and ban reduction ===
In February 2025, it was announced that, following an appeal to the Court of Arbitration for Sport, Mădăraș' suspension had been cut to two years and ultimately ended in August of that year.

== National representation ==
=== Davis Cup ===
Mădăraș has represented Sweden at the Davis Cup, where he made his first appearance in March 2022 in a tie against Japan.

== ITF Tour Finals ==
=== Singles: 31 (22 titles, 9 runner-ups) ===
Legend ITF Futures/WTT (22-9)	Finals by surface Hard (1–0) Clay (21-9)

Result	W–L	Date	Tournament	Tier	Surface	Opponent	Score
Loss	0–1	May 2015	Sweden F3, Båstad	Futures	Clay	(Sweden) Mikael Ymer	6–2, 1–6, 2–6
Win	1-1	Jul 2018	Estonia F1, Pärnu	Futures	Clay	(Russia) Markos Kalovelonis	6-2, 6-3
Loss	1–2	Oct 2018	Turkey F31, Antalya	Futures	Clay	(Czech Republic) Vít Kopřiva	6–7^{(5–7)}, 1–3 ret.
Loss	1-3	May 2019	M15 Kalmar, Sweden	WTT	Clay	(Sweden) Markus Eriksson	2–6, 2-6
Finalist	NP	Dec 2020	M15, Antalya, Turkey	WTT	Clay	(Bosnia and Herzegovina) Nerman Fatić	cancelled
Win	2-3	Mar 2021	M15 Antalya, Turkey	WTT	Clay	(Serbia) Miljan Zekić	2–6, 7-6^{(8-6)}, 6-5 ret.
Loss	2-4	Apr 2021	M15 Antalya, Turkey	WTT	Clay	(Italy) Flavio Cobolli	6–0, 3–6, 3–6
Win	3-4	May 2021	M15 Bucharest, Romania	WTT	Clay	(Spain) Pol Toledo Bagué	2–6, 6–3, 6–2
Win	4-4	Jul 2021	M15 Sofia, Bulgaria	WTT	Clay	(Argentina) Francisco Comesaña	2–6, 6–4, 7–6^{(9–7)}
Win	5-4	Dec 2021	M15 Antalya, Turkey	WTT	Clay	(United Kingdom) Billy Harris	7-5, 6-1
Win	6-4	Jan 2022	M15 Doha, Qatar	WTT	Hard	(Czech Republic) Martin Krumich	6-3, 6-2
Win	7-4	Jan 2022	M15 Antalya, Turkey	WTT	Clay	(Romania) Bogdan Ionut Apostol	6-0, 6-0
Win	8-4	Jan 2022	M15 Antalya, Turkey	WTT	Clay	(France) Corentin Denolly	7–6^{(7–5)}, 6–3
Win	9-4	May 2022	M15 Antalya, Turkey	WTT	Clay	(Ukraine) Oleg Prihodko	6-4, 6-2
Loss	9-5	Sep 2022	M25 Szabolcsveresmart, Hungary	WTT	Clay	(Czech Republic) Michael Vrbenský	1-6, 6–7^{(6–8)}
Win	10-5	Jan 2023	M15 Antalya, Turkey	WTT	Clay	(Spain) Àlex Marti Pujolras	6-1, 3–6, 6–2
Win	11-5	Jan 2023	M15 Antalya, Turkey	WTT	Clay	(Bulgaria) Yanaki Milev	6–3, 6–2
Win	12-5	Jan 2023	M15 Cairo, Egypt	WTT	Clay	(Spain) José Francisco Vidal Azorín	1–6, 6–3, 6–1
Win	13-5	Feb 2023	M25 Antalya, Turkey	WTT	Clay	(Italy) Edoardo Lavagno	3–6, 6–4, 6–2
Win	14-5	Mar 2023	M15 Antalya, Turkey	WTT	Clay	(Belgium) Gilles-Arnaud Bailly	6–3, 6–1
Loss	14-6	Apr 2023	M15 Antalya, Turkey	WTT	Clay	(Romania) Cezar Crețu	2–6, 6–1, 6–7^{(5–7)}
Win	15-6	Apr 2023	M15 Antalya, Turkey	WTT	Clay	(Netherlands) Sidané Pontjodikromo	6–0, 6–1
Loss	15-7	Apr 2023	M15 Antalya, Turkey	WTT	Clay	(Bulgaria) Yanaki Milev	4–6, 6–0, 4–6
Win	16-7	Apr 2023	M15 Antalya, Turkey	WTT	Clay	(Ukraine) Viacheslav Bielinskyi	3–2, ret.
Loss	16-8	Apr 2023	M15 Antalya, Turkey	WTT	Clay	(Argentina) Luciano Emanuel Ambrogi	6–7^{(4–7)}, 3–6
Win	17-8	May 2023	M25 Värnamo, Sweden	WTT	Clay	(United States) Oliver Crawford	7–6^{(7–4)}, 6–1
Win	18-8	May 2023	M15 Antalya, Turkey	WTT	Clay	(Argentina) Lorenzo Joaquín Rodríguez	7–5, 6–1
Loss	18-9	Jun 2023	M15 Nyíregyháza, Hungary	WTT	Clay	(Hungary) Péter Fajta	3–6, 2–6
Win	19-9	Jul 2023	M25 Brașov, Romania	WTT	Clay	(Romania) Vlad Andrei Dancu	6–3, 6–3
Win	20-9	Dec 2025	M15 Antalya, Turkey	WTT	Clay	(Morocco) Yassine Dlimi	6–2, 6–1
Win	21-9	Dec 2025	M15 Antalya, Turkey	WTT	Clay	(Germany) Michel Hopp	6–0, 4–6, 7–5
Win	22-9	Dec 2025	M15 Antalya, Turkey	WTT	Clay	(Ukraine) Oleksandr Ovcharenko	6–3, 6–0
