= 2016 Garanti Koza Sofia Open – Doubles =

Doubles
- 2016 Garanti Koza Sofia Open

Final
- Champions: (Netherlands) Wesley Koolhof (Netherlands) Matwé Middelkoop
- Runners-up: (Austria) Philipp Oswald (Canada) Adil Shamasdin
- Score: 5–7, 7–6^{(11–9)}, [10–6]

Events
Singles	Doubles
Garanti Koza Sofia Open	· 2017 →

This was the first edition of the tournament.

Wesley Koolhof and Matwé Middelkoop won the title, defeating Philipp Oswald and Adil Shamasdin in the final, 5–7, 7–6^{(11–9)}, [10–6].

== Seeds ==
1. (Germany) Philipp Petzschner / (Austria) Alexander Peya (quarterfinals)
2. (Croatia) Marin Draganja / (Austria) Julian Knowle (first round)
3. (Netherlands) Wesley Koolhof / (Netherlands) Matwé Middelkoop (champions)
4. (Belarus) Sergey Betov / (Russia) Mikhail Elgin (first round)

== Draw ==
=== Key ===
- Q = Qualifier
- WC = Wild card
- LL = Lucky loser
- Alt = Alternate
- SE = Special exempt
- PR = Protected ranking
- ITF = ITF entry
- JE = Junior exempt
- w/o = Walkover
- r = Retired
- d = Defaulted
- SR = Special ranking

=== Draw ===
First round
1	(Germany) P Petzschner (Austria) A Peya	7	6
(Luxembourg) G Müller (Denmark) F Nielsen	5	3
(Poland) M Fyrstenberg (Czech Republic) L Rosol	6	6
(Slovakia) M Kližan (Italy) A Seppi	4	4
4	(Belarus) S Betov (Russia) M Elgin	5	7	[5]
WC	(Turkey) T Altuna (Russia) K Kravchuk	7	5	[10]
(Austria) P Oswald (Canada) A Shamasdin	6	6
(Belarus) A Bury (Slovakia) I Zelenay	3	2
(South Korea) H Chung (Australia) M Ebden	3	6^{5}
PR	(Czech Republic) L Dlouhý (Ukraine) S Stakhovsky	6	7^{7}
WC	(Bulgaria) D Kuzmanov (Bulgaria) A Lazov	7^{7}	3	[10]
3	(Netherlands) W Koolhof (Netherlands) M Middelkoop	6^{5}	6	[12]
(Netherlands) T de Bakker (Netherlands) R Haase	6	6
PR	(Czech Republic) F Čermák (Slovakia) M Mertinák	3	2
(Serbia) I Bozoljac (Serbia) V Troicki	6	6
2	(Croatia) M Draganja (Austria) J Knowle	3	3

Quarterfinals
1	(Germany) P Petzschner (Austria) A Peya	3	3
(Poland) M Fyrstenberg (Czech Republic) L Rosol	6	6
WC	(Turkey) T Altuna (Russia) K Kravchuk	3	7^{8}	[8]
(Austria) P Oswald (Canada) A Shamasdin	6	6^{6}	[10]
PR	(Czech Republic) L Dlouhý (Ukraine) S Stakhovsky	1	7^{9}	[4]
3	(Netherlands) W Koolhof (Netherlands) M Middelkoop	6	6^{7}	[10]
(Netherlands) T de Bakker (Netherlands) R Haase	4	6	[10]
(Serbia) I Bozoljac (Serbia) V Troicki	6	4	[6]

Semifinals
(Poland) M Fyrstenberg (Czech Republic) L Rosol	6	3	[2]
(Austria) P Oswald (Canada) A Shamasdin	4	6	[10]
3	(Netherlands) W Koolhof (Netherlands) M Middelkoop	2	7^{7}	[11]
(Netherlands) T de Bakker (Netherlands) R Haase	6	6^{3}	[9]

Final
(Austria) P Oswald (Canada) A Shamasdin	7	6^{9}	[6]
3	(Netherlands) W Koolhof (Netherlands) M Middelkoop	5	7^{11}	[10]
