= 2016 Garanti Koza Sofia Open – Singles =

Singles
- 2016 Garanti Koza Sofia Open

Final
- Champion: (Spain) Roberto Bautista Agut
- Runner-up: (Serbia) Viktor Troicki
- Score: 6–3, 6–4

Events
Singles	Doubles
- Garanti Koza Sofia Open

This was the first edition of the tournament.

Roberto Bautista Agut won the title, defeating Viktor Troicki in the final, 6–3, 6–4.

== Seeds ==
The top four seeds receive a bye into the second round.

1. (Spain) Roberto Bautista Agut (champion)
2. (Serbia) Viktor Troicki (final)
3. (Spain) Guillermo García López (quarterfinals)
4. (Italy) Andreas Seppi (quarterfinals)
5. (Germany) Philipp Kohlschreiber (quarterfinals)
6. (Luxembourg) Gilles Müller (semifinals)
7. (Slovakia) Martin Kližan (semifinals)
8. (France) Adrian Mannarino (quarterfinals)

== Draw ==
Key

- Q = Qualifier
- WC = Wild card
- LL = Lucky loser
- Alt = Alternate
- ITF = ITF entry
- PR = Protected ranking
- SR = Special ranking
- SE = Special exempt
- JE = Junior exempt
- JR = Junior Accelerator Programme entrant
- CO = College Accelerator Programme entrant
- NG = Next Gen Accelerator Program entrant
- w/o = Walkover
- r = Retired
- d = Defaulted

=== Finals ===
Semifinals
1	(Spain) Roberto Bautista Agut	7^{7}	6
6	(Luxembourg) Gilles Müller	6^{5}	4
7	(Slovakia) Martin Kližan	6	3	5
2	(Serbia) Viktor Troicki	4	6	7

Final
1	(Spain) Roberto Bautista Agut	6	6
2	(Serbia) Viktor Troicki	3	4

=== Top half ===
First round
(Serbia) F Krajinović	6	3	6
WC	(Turkey) M İlhan	3	6	4
(South Korea) H Chung	2	3
Q	(Romania) M Copil	6	6
(Russia) E Donskoy	2	5
8	(France) A Mannarino	6	7
(India) Y Bhambri	3	6^{4}
Q	(Bosnia and Herzegovina) M Bašić	6	7^{7}
(Lithuania) R Berankis	6	2	6
WC	(Bulgaria) D Kuzmanov	3	6	3
(Tunisia) M Jaziri	3	2
6	(Luxembourg) G Müller	6	6

Second round
1	(Spain) R Bautista Agut	w/o
(Serbia) F Krajinović
Q	(Romania) M Copil	4	7^{7}	3
8	(France) A Mannarino	6	6^{5}	6
3	(Spain) G García López	6	6
Q	(Bosnia and Herzegovina) M Bašić	3	4
(Lithuania) R Berankis	5	6^{4}
6	(Luxembourg) G Müller	7	7^{7}

Quarterfinals
1	(Spain) R Bautista Agut	6	6
8	(France) A Mannarino	4	3
3	(Spain) G García López	6^{6}	4
6	(Luxembourg) G Müller	7^{8}	6

Semifinals
1	(Spain) R Bautista Agut	7^{7}	6
6	(Luxembourg) G Müller	6^{5}	4

=== Bottom half ===
First round
7	(Slovakia) M Kližan	6	6
WC	(Bulgaria) A Lazov	3	0
(Netherlands) R Haase	6	3	4
(Czech Republic) L Rosol	3	6	6
(Australia) M Ebden	4	1
(Netherlands) T de Bakker	6	6
5	(Germany) P Kohlschreiber	6	6
(Ukraine) S Stakhovsky	2	2
(Bosnia and Herzegovina) D Džumhur	6	3	6
(Czech Republic) J Veselý	3	6	3
Q	(Germany) D Brands	7^{7}	6
Q	(Italy) T Fabbiano	6^{5}	3

Second round
7	(Slovakia) M Kližan	6	2	7^{7}
(Czech Republic) L Rosol	3	6	6^{4}
(Netherlands) T de Bakker	2	1
4	(Italy) A Seppi	6	6
5	(Germany) P Kohlschreiber	6	4	6
(Bosnia and Herzegovina) D Džumhur	1	6	3
Q	(Germany) D Brands	4	3
2	(Serbia) V Troicki	6	6

Quarterfinals
7	(Slovakia) M Kližan	6	6
4	(Italy) A Seppi	4	3
5	(Germany) P Kohlschreiber	3	4
2	(Serbia) V Troicki	6	6

Semifinals
7	(Slovakia) M Kližan	6	3	5
2	(Serbia) V Troicki	4	6	7

== Qualifying ==
=== Seeds ===
1. (Japan) Yūichi Sugita (qualifying competition)
2. (Russia) Konstantin Kravchuk (qualifying competition)
3. (Bosnia and Herzegovina) Mirza Bašić (qualified)
4. (Italy) Thomas Fabbiano (qualified)
5. (Germany) Daniel Brands (qualified)
6. (Uzbekistan) Farrukh Dustov (qualifying competition)
7. (Kazakhstan) Aleksandr Nedovyesov (first round)
8. (Romania) Marius Copil (qualified)

=== Qualifiers ===
1. (Romania) Marius Copil
2. (Germany) Daniel Brands
3. (Bosnia and Herzegovina) Mirza Bašić
4. (Italy) Thomas Fabbiano

=== Qualifying draw ===
==== First qualifier ====
First round
1	(Japan) Yūichi Sugita	6	6
WC	(Turkey) Cem İlkel	4	1
WC	(Bulgaria) Alexandar Lazarov	6^{5}	4
8	(Romania) Marius Copil	7^{7}	6

Qualifying competition
1	(Japan) Yūichi Sugita	3	4
8	(Romania) Marius Copil	6	6

==== Second qualifier ====
First round
2	(Russia) Konstantin Kravchuk	6	5	6
(Belgium) Yannick Mertens	2	7	2
(Romania) Adrian Ungur	3	6^{1}
5	(Germany) Daniel Brands	6	7^{7}

Qualifying competition
2	(Russia) Konstantin Kravchuk	6	6^{5}	4
5	(Germany) Daniel Brands	4	7^{7}	6

==== Third qualifier ====
First round
3	(Bosnia and Herzegovina) Mirza Bašić	6^{2}	6	7
(Israel) Amir Weintraub	7^{7}	3	5
(Bosnia and Herzegovina) Aldin Šetkić	7	3	3
6	(Uzbekistan) Farrukh Dustov	5	6	6

Qualifying competition
3	(Bosnia and Herzegovina) Mirza Bašić	6	6
6	(Uzbekistan) Farrukh Dustov	3	3

==== Fourth qualifier ====
First round
4	(Italy) Thomas Fabbiano	6	6
(Serbia) Laslo Djere	4	4
(Hungary) Márton Fucsovics	7^{7}	6
7	(Kazakhstan) Aleksandr Nedovyesov	6^{2}	2

Qualifying competition
4	(Italy) Thomas Fabbiano	6	6
(Hungary) Márton Fucsovics	4	1
