= 2017 Garanti Koza Sofia Open – Singles =

Singles
- 2017 Garanti Koza Sofia Open

Final
- Champion: (Bulgaria) Grigor Dimitrov
- Runner-up: (Belgium) David Goffin
- Score: 7–5, 6–4

Details
- Draw: 28 (4 Q / 3 WC )
- Seeds: 8

Events
Singles	Doubles
- Garanti Koza Sofia Open

Roberto Bautista Agut was the defending champion, but lost in the semifinals to David Goffin.

Grigor Dimitrov won the title, defeating Goffin in the final, 7–5, 6–4.

== Seeds ==
The top four seeds receive a bye into the second round.

1. (Austria) Dominic Thiem (second round)
2. (Belgium) David Goffin (final)
3. (Bulgaria) Grigor Dimitrov (champion)
4. (Spain) Roberto Bautista Agut (semifinals)
5. (Luxembourg) Gilles Müller (quarterfinals)
6. (Germany) Philipp Kohlschreiber (withdrew)
7. (Cyprus) Marcos Baghdatis (withdrew)
8. (Slovakia) Martin Kližan (quarterfinals)
9. (Serbia) Viktor Troicki (quarterfinals)

== Draw ==
Key

- Q = Qualifier
- WC = Wild card
- LL = Lucky loser
- Alt = Alternate
- ITF = ITF entry
- PR = Protected ranking
- SR = Special ranking
- SE = Special exempt
- JE = Junior exempt
- JR = Junior Accelerator Programme entrant
- CO = College Accelerator Programme entrant
- NG = Next Gen Accelerator Program entrant
- w/o = Walkover
- r = Retired
- d = Defaulted

=== Finals ===
Semifinals
(Georgia (country)) Nikoloz Basilashvili	1	3
3	(Bulgaria) Grigor Dimitrov	6	6
4	(Spain) Roberto Bautista Agut	7	4	6^{3}
2	(Belgium) David Goffin	5	6	7^{7}

Final
3	(Bulgaria) Grigor Dimitrov	7	6
2	(Belgium) David Goffin	5	4

=== Top half ===
First round
(Georgia (country)) N Basilashvili	7^{9}	7^{7}
(France) A Mannarino	6^{7}	6^{3}
(Switzerland) M Chiudinelli	7^{7}	6^{4}	2
Q	(Germany) D Brands	6^{4}	7^{7}	6
(Russia) A Kuznetsov	0	6^{4}
8	(Slovakia) M Kližan	6	7^{7}
PR	(Poland) J Janowicz	6	6
(Israel) D Sela	4	4
(Netherlands) R Haase	6	6
WC	(Bulgaria) D Kuzmanov	4	3
WC	(Turkey) C İlkel	3	2
9	(Serbia) V Troicki	6	6

Second round
1	(Austria) D Thiem	4	4
(Georgia (country)) N Basilashvili	6	6
Q	(Germany) D Brands	6^{3}	2
8	(Slovakia) M Kližan	7^{7}	6
3	(Bulgaria) G Dimitrov	4	6	7
PR	(Poland) J Janowicz	6	3	5
(Netherlands) R Haase	6	4	6^{3}
9	(Serbia) V Troicki	2	6	7^{7}

Quarterfinals
(Georgia (country)) N Basilashvili	0	6	6
8	(Slovakia) M Kližan	6	3	3
3	(Bulgaria) G Dimitrov	6	6
9	(Serbia) V Troicki	3	3

Semifinals
(Georgia (country)) N Basilashvili	1	3
3	(Bulgaria) G Dimitrov	6	6

=== Bottom half ===
First round
5	(Luxembourg) G Müller	6	6
Q	(France) M Bourgue	3	2
LL	(Serbia) M Tepavac	6^{2}	4
(Russia) M Youzhny	7^{7}	6
Q	(Germany) C-M Stebe	2	6	6
LL	(Russia) T Gabashvili	6	0	1
Q	(Germany) M Marterer	3	6^{3}
(Belgium) S Darcis	6	7^{7}
(Bosnia and Herzegovina) D Džumhur	6^{3}	6	3
(Italy) A Seppi	7^{7}	3	6
WC	(Bulgaria) A Lazarov	6^{0}	2
(Moldova) R Albot	7^{7}	6

Second round
5	(Luxembourg) G Müller	6	7
(Russia) M Youzhny	3	5
Q	(Germany) C-M Stebe	6^{4}	3
4	(Spain) R Bautista Agut	7^{7}	6
(Belgium) S Darcis	6	7
(Italy) A Seppi	3	5
(Moldova) R Albot	2	7^{9}	3
2	(Belgium) D Goffin	6	6^{7}	6

Quarterfinals
5	(Luxembourg) G Müller	5	6^{5}
4	(Spain) R Bautista Agut	7	7^{7}
(Belgium) S Darcis	1	3
2	(Belgium) D Goffin	6	6

Semifinals
4	(Spain) R Bautista Agut	7	4	6^{3}
2	(Belgium) D Goffin	5	6	7^{7}

== Qualifying ==
=== Seeds ===
1. (Russia) Teymuraz Gabashvili (qualifying competition, lucky loser)
2. (Canada) Steven Diez (first round)
3. (Germany) Maximilian Marterer (qualified)
4. (France) Mathias Bourgue (qualified)
5. (Japan) Hiroki Moriya (first round)
6. (Greece) Stefanos Tsitsipas (first round)
7. (Serbia) Marko Tepavac (qualifying competition, lucky loser)
8. (Germany) Daniel Brands (qualified)

=== Qualifiers ===
1. (Germany) Daniel Brands
2. (Germany) Cedrik-Marcel Stebe
3. (Germany) Maximilian Marterer
4. (France) Mathias Bourgue

=== Lucky losers ===
1. (Russia) Teymuraz Gabashvili
2. (Serbia) Marko Tepavac

=== Qualifying draw ===
==== First qualifier ====
First round
1	(Russia) Teymuraz Gabashvili	7	4	7^{7}
(Germany) Daniel Masur	5	6	6^{5}
(Belgium) Yannick Mertens	5	6	2
8	(Germany) Daniel Brands	7	4	6

Qualifying competition
1	(Russia) Teymuraz Gabashvili	4	6	4
8	(Germany) Daniel Brands	6	3	6

==== Second qualifier ====
First round
2	(Canada) Steven Diez	3	6^{1}
PR	(Germany) Cedrik-Marcel Stebe	6	7^{7}
(Serbia) Miljan Zekić	6	6
6	(Greece) Stefanos Tsitsipas	4	3

Qualifying competition
PR	(Germany) Cedrik-Marcel Stebe	7^{7}	6
(Serbia) Miljan Zekić	6^{4}	0

==== Third qualifier ====
First round
3	(Germany) Maximilian Marterer	6	6
WC	(Bulgaria) Adrian Andreev	2	0
WC	(Turkey) Sarp Ağabigün	4	2
7	(Serbia) Marko Tepavac	6	6

Qualifying competition
3	(Germany) Maximilian Marterer	7^{7}	7
7	(Serbia) Marko Tepavac	6^{4}	5

==== Fourth qualifier ====
First round
4	(France) Mathias Bourgue	5	6	6
(France) Alexandre Sidorenko	7	3	2
(Serbia) Filip Krajinović	6	6
5	(Japan) Hiroki Moriya	3	4

Qualifying competition
4	(France) Mathias Bourgue	7^{9}	6
(Serbia) Filip Krajinović	6^{7}	4
