= 2009 PBZ Zagreb Indoors – Doubles =

Doubles
- 2009 PBZ Zagreb Indoors

Final
- Champions: (Czech Republic) Martin Damm (Sweden) Robert Lindstedt
- Runners-up: (Germany) Christopher Kas (Netherlands) Rogier Wassen
- Score: 6–4, 6–3

Details
- Draw: 16
- Seeds: 4

Events
Singles	Doubles
- PBZ Zagreb Indoors

Paul Hanley and Jordan Kerr were the defending champions, but lost in the quarterfinals to Philipp Petzschner and Alexander Peya.

== Seeds ==
1. (Czech Republic) Martin Damm / (Sweden) Robert Lindstedt (champions)
2. (Sweden) Simon Aspelin / (Czech Republic) Pavel Vízner (semifinals)
3. (United Kingdom) Jamie Murray / (Serbia) Dušan Vemić (first round)
4. (Germany) Christopher Kas / (Netherlands) Rogier Wassen (final)

== Draw ==
Key

- Q = Qualifier
- WC = Wild card
- LL = Lucky loser
- Alt = Alternate
- ITF = ITF entry
- PR = Protected ranking
- SR = Special ranking
- SE = Special exempt
- JE = Junior exempt
- JR = Junior Accelerator Programme entrant
- CO = College Accelerator Programme entrant
- NG = Next Gen Accelerator Program entrant
- w/o = Walkover
- r = Retired
- d = Defaulted

=== Draw ===
First round
1	(Czech Republic) M Damm (Sweden) R Lindstedt	6	4	[10]
ALT	(Croatia) I Dodig (Sweden) E Eleskovic	3	6	[8]
(Italy) S Bolelli (Italy) A Seppi	6	6
WC	(Croatia) N Mektić (Croatia) I Zovko	4	4
3	(United Kingdom) J Murray (Serbia) D Vemić	4	5
(Germany) P Petzschner (Austria) A Peya	6	7
(Russia) I Andreev (Serbia) V Troicki	4	6	[5]
(Australia) P Hanley (Australia) J Kerr	6	3	[10]
WC	(Croatia) F Škugor (Croatia) J Topić	4	6	[10]
(France) M Gicquel (France) P-H Mathieu	6	4	[8]
(Croatia) M Čilić (Croatia) L Zovko	4	6^{11}
4	(Germany) C Kas (Netherlands) R Wassen	6	7^{13}
(Russia) M Youzhny (Germany) M Zverev	6	7^{7}
(United States) T Parrott (Slovakia) F Polášek	2	6^{5}
(Austria) J Knowle (Austria) J Melzer	6	6^{3}	[4]
2	(Sweden) S Aspelin (Czech Republic) P Vízner	3	7^{7}	[10]

Quarterfinals
1	(Czech Republic) M Damm (Sweden) R Lindstedt	6	7
(Italy) S Bolelli (Italy) A Seppi	3	5
(Germany) P Petzschner (Austria) A Peya	6	7^{7}
(Australia) P Hanley (Australia) J Kerr	4	6^{5}
WC	(Croatia) F Škugor (Croatia) J Topić	3	6	[10]
4	(Germany) C Kas (Netherlands) R Wassen	6	3	[12]
(Russia) M Youzhny (Germany) M Zverev	4	2
2	(Sweden) S Aspelin (Czech Republic) P Vízner	6	6

Semifinals
1	(Czech Republic) M Damm (Sweden) R Lindstedt	6	6
(Germany) P Petzschner (Austria) A Peya	4	4
4	(Germany) C Kas (Netherlands) R Wassen	6	2	[10]
2	(Sweden) S Aspelin (Czech Republic) P Vízner	2	6	[7]

Final
1	(Czech Republic) M Damm (Sweden) R Lindstedt	6	6
4	(Germany) C Kas (Netherlands) R Wassen	4	3
