= 2017 Garanti Koza Sofia Open – Doubles =

Doubles
- 2017 Garanti Koza Sofia Open

Final
- Champions: (Serbia) Viktor Troicki (Serbia) Nenad Zimonjić
- Runners-up: (Russia) Mikhail Elgin (Russia) Andrey Kuznetsov
- Score: 6–4, 6–4

Details
- Draw: 16
- Seeds: 4

Events
| Singles | Doubles |
| ← 2016 · | Garanti Koza Sofia Open | · 2018 → |

Wesley Koolhof and Matwé Middelkoop were the defending champions, but they lost in first round to Ken and Neal Skupski.

Viktor Troicki and Nenad Zimonjić won the title, defeating Mikhail Elgin and Andrey Kuznetsov in the final, 6–4, 6–4.

== Seeds ==
1. (Netherlands) Jean-Julien Rojer / (Romania) Horia Tecău (quarterfinals)
2. (Croatia) Mate Pavić / (Austria) Alexander Peya (semifinals)
3. (United Kingdom) Dominic Inglot / (Romania) Florin Mergea (first round)
4. (Poland) Marcin Matkowski / (Pakistan) Aisam-ul-Haq Qureshi (first round)

== Draw ==
=== Key ===
- Q = Qualifier
- WC = Wild card
- LL = Lucky loser
- Alt = Alternate
- SE = Special exempt
- PR = Protected ranking
- ITF = ITF entry
- JE = Junior exempt
- w/o = Walkover
- r = Retired
- d = Defaulted
- SR = Special ranking

=== Draw ===
First round
1 | (Netherlands) J-J Rojer (Romania) H Tecău | w/o
(Cyprus) M Baghdatis (Luxembourg) G Müller
(Serbia) V Troicki (Serbia) N Zimonjić | 6 | 7^{7}
(Sweden) J Brunström (Sweden) A Siljeström | 4 | 6^{3}
4 | (Poland) M Matkowski (Pakistan) A-u-H Qureshi | 6^{7} | 7^{7} | [14]
(Poland) M Fyrstenberg (Slovakia) M Kližan | 7^{9} | 6^{3} | [16]
(United Kingdom) K Skupski (United Kingdom) N Skupski | 6^{3} | 6 | [10]
(Netherlands) W Koolhof (Netherlands) M Middelkoop | 7^{7} | 4 | [7]
(Moldova) R Albot (Israel) D Sela | 6 | 6^{3} | [10]
WC | (Turkey) T Altuna (Turkey) C İlkel | 2 | 7^{7} | [3]
(Russia) M Elgin (Russia) A Kuznetsov | 7^{8} | 6
3 | (United Kingdom) D Inglot (Romania) F Mergea | 6^{6} | 3
WC | (Bulgaria) D Kuzmanov (Bulgaria) A Lazov | 6 | 6^{9} | [10]
(Uruguay) A Behar (Belarus) A Vasilevski | 4 | 7^{11} | [7]
(Netherlands) R Haase (Germany) P Petzschner | 6^{8} | 3
2 | (Croatia) M Pavić (Austria) A Peya | 7^{10} | 6

Quarterfinals
1 | (Netherlands) J-J Rojer (Romania) H Tecău | 4 | 3
(Serbia) V Troicki (Serbia) N Zimonjić | 6 | 6
(Poland) M Fyrstenberg (Slovakia) M Kližan | 4 | 6 | [10]
(United Kingdom) K Skupski (United Kingdom) N Skupski | 6 | 3 | [8]
(Moldova) R Albot (Israel) D Sela | 2 | 7^{7} | [5]
(Russia) M Elgin (Russia) A Kuznetsov | 6 | 6^{5} | [10]
WC | (Bulgaria) D Kuzmanov (Bulgaria) A Lazov | 2 | 4
2 | (Croatia) M Pavić (Austria) A Peya | 6 | 6

Semifinals
(Serbia) V Troicki (Serbia) N Zimonjić | 3 | 7^{7} | [10]
(Poland) M Fyrstenberg (Slovakia) M Kližan | 6 | 6^{5} | [8]
(Russia) M Elgin (Russia) A Kuznetsov | 6 | 6
2 | (Croatia) M Pavić (Austria) A Peya | 4 | 4

Final
(Serbia) V Troicki (Serbia) N Zimonjić | 6 | 6
(Russia) M Elgin (Russia) A Kuznetsov | 4 | 4
