= 2017 Garanti Koza Sofia Open =

2017 tennis tournament in Bulgaria

- Date: 5–12 February
- Edition: 2nd
- Category: World Tour 250 series
- Draw: 28S / 16D
- Prize money: €482,060
- Surface: Hard / indoor
- Location: Sofia, Bulgaria
- Venue: Arena Armeec

Champions

Singles
- (Bulgaria) Grigor Dimitrov

Doubles
- (Serbia) Viktor Troicki / (Serbia) Nenad Zimonjić
← 2016 ·	Sofia Open	· 2018 →

The 2017 Sofia Open (also known as 2017 Garanti Koza Sofia Open for sponsorship reasons) was a men's tennis tournament played on indoor hard courts. It was the second edition of the Sofia Open as part of the ATP World Tour 250 series of the 2017 ATP World Tour. It took place at the Arena Armeec in Sofia, Bulgaria, from 5 February until 12 February 2017. Third-seeded Grigor Dimitrov won the singles title.

== Finals ==
=== Singles ===
- (Bulgaria) Grigor Dimitrov defeated (Belgium) David Goffin, 7–5, 6–4

=== Doubles ===
- (Serbia) Viktor Troicki / (Serbia) Nenad Zimonjić defeated (Russia) Mikhail Elgin / (Russia) Andrey Kuznetsov, 6–4, 6–4

== Points and prize money ==
=== Point distribution ===
Event	W	F	SF	QF	Round of 16	Round of 32	Q	Q2	Q1
Singles	250	150	90	45	20	0	12	6	0
Doubles	250	150	90	45	0	—	—	—	—

=== Prize money ===
Event	W	F	SF	QF	Round of 16	Round of 32	Q2	Q1
Singles	€85,945	€45,265	€24,520	€13,970	€8,230	€4,875	€2,195	€1,100
Doubles	€26,110	€13,730	€7,440	€4,260	€2,490	—	—	—
Doubles prize money per team

== Singles main-draw entrants ==
=== Seeds ===
Country	Player	Rank^{1}	Seed
AUT	Dominic Thiem	8	1
BEL	David Goffin	11	2
BUL	Grigor Dimitrov	13	3
ESP	Roberto Bautista Agut	16	4
LUX	Gilles Müller	28	5
~~GER~~	~~Philipp Kohlschreiber~~	~~29~~	~~6~~
~~CYP~~	~~Marcos Baghdatis~~	~~34~~	~~7~~
SVK	Martin Kližan	36	8
SRB	Viktor Troicki	37	9

- ^{1} Rankings as of January 30, 2017

=== Other entrants ===
The following players received wildcards into the singles main draw:

- (Turkey) Cem İlkel
- (Bulgaria) Dimitar Kuzmanov
- (Bulgaria) Alexandar Lazarov

The following players received entry from the qualifying draw:

- (France) Mathias Bourgue
- (Germany) Daniel Brands
- (Germany) Maximilian Marterer
- (Germany) Cedrik-Marcel Stebe

The following players received entry as lucky losers:

- (Russia) Teymuraz Gabashvili
- (Serbia) Marko Tepavac

=== Withdrawals ===
Before the tournament

- (Spain) Nicolás Almagro →replaced by (Switzerland) Marco Chiudinelli
- (Cyprus) Marcos Baghdatis →replaced by (Russia) Teymuraz Gabashvili
- (Germany) Philipp Kohlschreiber →replaced by (Serbia) Marko Tepavac
- (Australia) John Millman →replaced by (Moldova) Radu Albot

== Doubles main-draw entrants ==
=== Seeds ===
Country	Player	Country	Player	Rank^{1}	Seed
NED	Jean-Julien Rojer	ROU	Horia Tecău	45	1
CRO	Mate Pavić	AUT	Alexander Peya	66	2
GBR	Dominic Inglot	ROU	Florin Mergea	69	3
POL	Marcin Matkowski	PAK	Aisam-ul-Haq Qureshi	98	4

- ^{1} Rankings as of January 30, 2017

=== Other entrants ===
The following pairs received wildcards into the doubles main draw:

- (Turkey) Tuna Altuna / (Turkey) Cem İlkel
- (Bulgaria) Dimitar Kuzmanov / (Bulgaria) Alexandar Lazov

=== Withdrawals ===
Before the tournament

- (Cyprus) Marcos Baghdatis
