= Arena Sofia =

Multi-purpose indoor arena in Sofia, Bulgaria

- Арена София
- Exterior of the arena
- Interactive map of Arena Sofia
- Full name: Arena 8888 Sofia
- Former names: Arena Armeets Sofia (2011–2022)
- Address: 1 Asen Yordanov Blvd
- Location: Sofia, Bulgaria
- Coordinates: 42°40′16″N 23°22′9″E
- Owner: National Sport Base PLC
- Capacity: General: 12,373; Boxing: 15,545; Tennis: 10,500; Wrestling: 13,545; Basketball, volleyball: 15,373; Concerts: 17,906
- Surface: Parquet

Construction
- Groundbreaking: 2 July 2009
- Opened: 30 July 2011
- Cost: BGN 90 million (EUR € 47 million)
- Architect: Zheko Tilev
- Main contractor: Glavbolgarstroy

Tenants
- Bulgaria men's national volleyball team (CEV) (2011–present); Sofia Open (ATP 250) (2016–2023)

Website
- arenaarmeecsofia.net

Arena Sofia (Bulgarian: Арена София, [ɐˈrɛnə ˈsɔfijə]), currently known as Arena 8888 Sofia for sponsorship reasons, is a multi-purpose indoor arena located in Sofia, Bulgaria. Opened in July 2011, it has a general seating capacity of 12,373.

Designed as a universal hall for cultural events and sports, the arena could host up to 30 types of sports, including basketball, volleyball, handball, futsal, boxing, tennis, weightlifting, fencing and gymnastics competitions, as well as concerts with a maximum capacity of 17,906 in its largest configuration.

It was formerly called Arena Armeets after the Bulgarian insurance company Armeets purchased the naming rights, until the sponsorship was terminated in October 2022. Since September 2024, it is sponsored by the online gambling platform 8888.bg.

== Construction and facilities ==
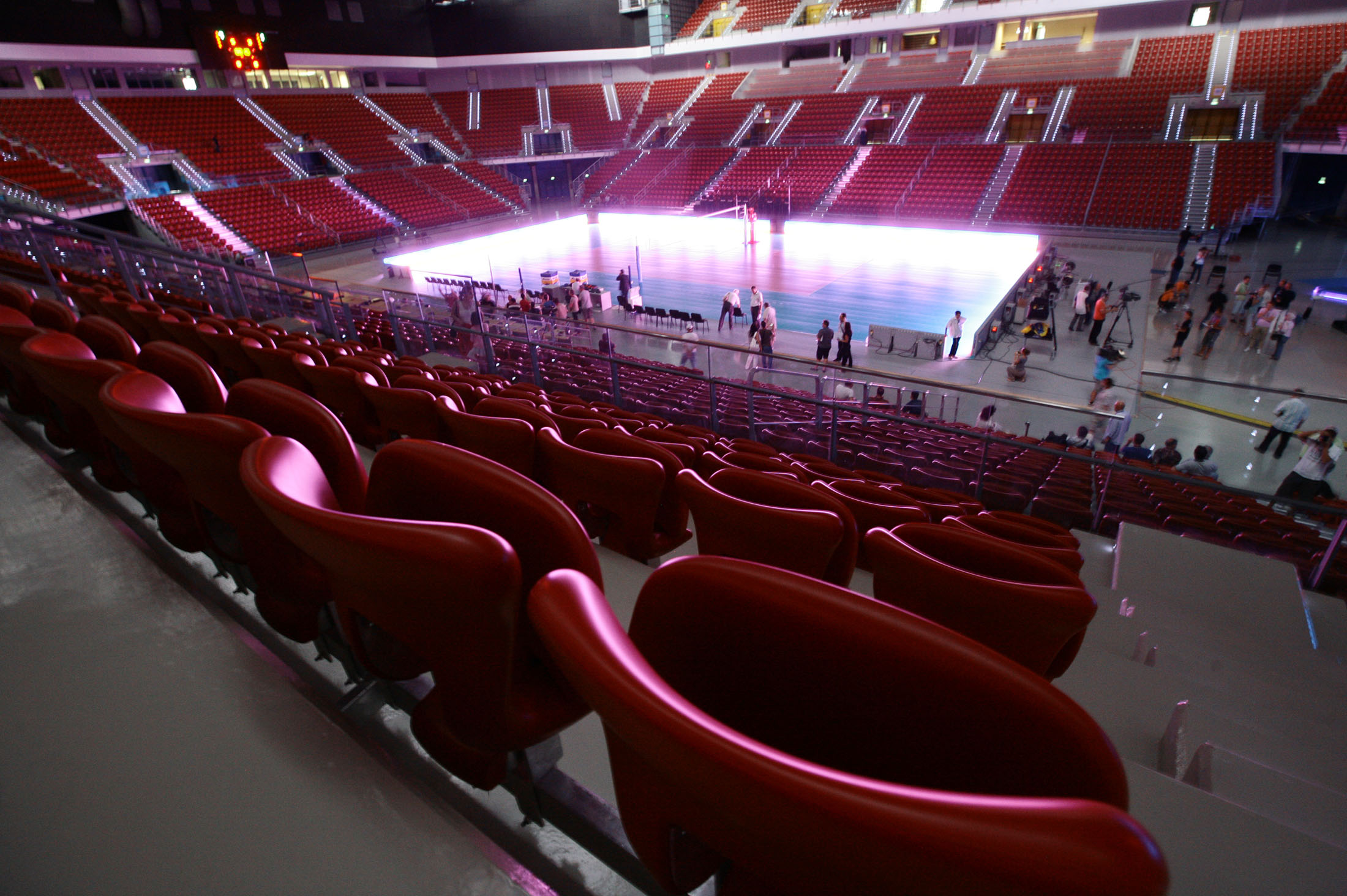
The completed arena in July 2011

The decision to build a new multi-purpose arena in the Bulgarian capital with financial support from the Bulgarian state was made in 2008. A tender process was subsequently launched and in early June 2009, the Ministry of Youth and Sports of Bulgaria officially launched the project and revealed that state-owned company Glavbolgarstroy, as the primary contractor, had submitted the winning bid for this tender. The construction was initially projected to cost 107 million Bulgarian lev. During the 2009 Bulgarian parliamentary election campaign, the groundbreaking ceremony was performed on 2 July 2009, by the then Prime Minister of Bulgaria, Sergey Stanishev. Following the change of government in 2009, the new government under Boyko Borisov determined that the financing of the project was not secured. Against the backdrop of the global economic crisis, the government of Borissov was able to renegotiate the construction costs and reduce them to 90 million BGN.

The new arena complex was designed by architect Zheko Tilev and built in the Slatina district, near Aviation Square and Tsarigradsko shose boulevard. It was officially opened on 30 July 2011 by Prime Minister Borisov, with the opening event including a friendly match held between the Bulgarian and Serbian men's national volleyball teams that was attended by more than 12,000 spectators and televised live by Bulgarian National Television.

The main seating capacity in the stands is 12,373 for basketball and volleyball matches, with the possibility of increasing up to 13,500 seats for wrestling and tennis competitions, 15,500 for boxing matches, and up to 17,900 when configured for concerts. Telescopic stands, with seating for 3,500 spectators, can be entirely or partially folded away in order to place additional seating on the arena floor or to clear the entire area for a standing audience. The arena has air conditioning, electronic dashboards, a high-resolution video cube and meets all the hosting requirements of the international sport federations. There are 887 parking lots, 614 of them placed in a central exterior parking, 231 placed in near streets and 42 designated for disabled people. The underground level of the arena features a number of dressing rooms, a press conference hall which can accommodate 120 journalists, a smaller sports training hall with 200 seats, a fitness and spa center, restaurant and snack bar.

== Major events and notable firsts ==
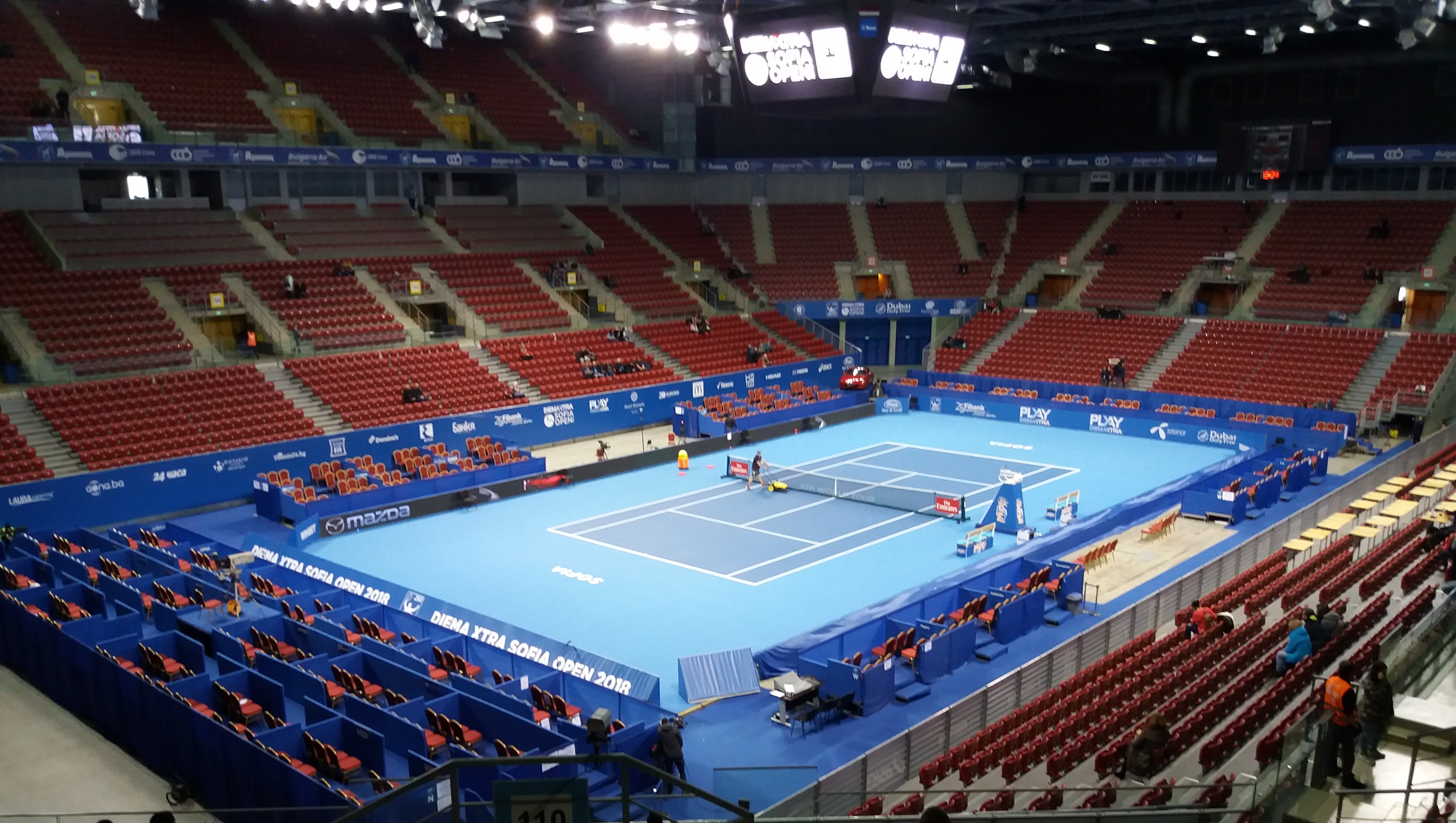
Arena hosting the 2018 Sofia Open

The first major concert in the arena was held by Jean Michel Jarre, followed by artists Sade and Amorphis.

The arena has hosted the 2012 European Taekwon-do ITF championship in May, followed by the 2012 Aerobic Gymnastics World Championships in the first three days of June. The city was previously awarded the 2004 edition of the event.

During three days in February 2012 the arena hosted the Cirque du Soleil show Saltimbanco for the first time in Bulgaria. Between 9 and 11 November 2012 it also hosted the travelling ice show Disney on Ice, another debut for the country.

The Junior Eurovision Song Contest 2015 was held in the arena on 21 November 2015, the first time a Eurovision event was held in Bulgaria.

The arena recorded its first sold-out game on 9 June 2012, when 12,501 fans (128 more than the official capacity) came to see the Olympic qualification volleyball match between France and Bulgaria. It was originally scheduled to be used for the 2020 FIBA Under-17 Basketball World Cup but was ultimately canceled due to the COVID-19 pandemic.

Bulgaria's ruling GERB party is a consistent user of the arena, having held its rallies and conferences within it for years.

On 17 May 2026, the Mayor of Sofia, Vasil Terziev, announced the city would bid to host the Eurovision Song Contest 2027 with this venue.

== List of major sporting events ==
- European qualification tournament for Wrestling at the 2012 Summer Olympics – April 2012
- European qualification for the 2012 Men's Olympic Volleyball Tournament – 8–13 May 2012
- 2012 Aerobic Gymnastics World Championships – 1–3 June 2012
- World qualification for the 2012 Men's Olympic Volleyball Tournament – 8–10 June 2012
- 2012 FIVB World League Final Round – 4–8 July 2012
- 2012 WTA Tournament of Champions – 30 October – 4 November 2012
- 2013 Summer Deaflympics – 26 July – 4 August 2013
- 2013 WTA Tournament of Champions – 29 October – 3 November 2013
- 2013 Trampoline World Championships - 7–10 November 2013
- 2014 European Women's Artistic Gymnastics Championships – 12–18 May 2014
- 2014 European Men's Artistic Gymnastics Championships – 19–25 May 2014
- 2014 FIG Rhythmic Gymnastics World Cup Sofia - 9–10 August 2014
- 2014 WTA Tournament of Champions – 28 October – 2 November 2014
- 2015 FIG Rhythmic Gymnastics World Cup Sofia - 15–16 August 2015
- 2015 Men's European Volleyball Championship - 9–18 October 2015
- 2016 Garanti Koza Sofia Open - 1–7 February 2016
- 2016 FIG Rhythmic Gymnastics World Cup Sofia - 27–29 May 2016
- 2016 World Sambo Championships - 10–14 November 2016
- 2017 Garanti Koza Sofia Open - 5–12 February 2017
- 2017 European Taekwondo Championships 20–23 April 2017
- 2017 FIG Rhythmic Gymnastics World Cup Sofia - 5–7 May 2017
- 2017 Trampoline World Championships - 9–12 November 2017
- 2018 Diema Xtra Sofia Open - 4–11 February 2018
- 2018 World Junior Figure Skating Championships - 5–11 March 2018
- 2018 FIG Rhythmic Gymnastics World Cup Sofia - 30 March-1 April 2018
- 2018 Rhythmic Gymnastics World Championships - 10–16 September 2018
- 2018 FIVB Volleyball World Championship - 9–30 September 2018
- 2020 FIBA Under-17 Basketball World Cup - 4–12 July 2020

== See also ==
- List of indoor arenas in Bulgaria

Preceded by Ergo Arena; Gdańsk / Sopot	FIVB Volleyball World League; Final Venue; 2012	Succeeded by Polideportivo Islas Malvinas; Mar del Plata
Preceded by Malta Shipbuilding; Marsa, Malta	Junior Eurovision Song Contest; Venue; 2015	Succeeded by Mediterranean Conference Centre; Valletta
