= 2014 Città di Como Challenger – Singles =

Singles
- 2014 Città di Como Challenger

Final
- Champion: (Serbia) Viktor Troicki
- Runner-up: (Republic of Ireland) Louk Sorensen
- Score: 6–3, 6–2

Events
Singles	Doubles
← 2013 ·	Città di Como Challenger	· 2015 →

The 2014 Città di Como Challenger – Singles is a part of the 2014 Città di Como Challenger. It was a professional tennis tournament played on clay courts and was a part of the 2014 ATP Challenger Tour. Viktor Troicki won the singles title by beating Louk Sorensen 6–3, 6–2

== Seeds ==
1. (Argentina) Facundo Argüello (quarterfinals)
2. (France) Pierre-Hugues Herbert (second round)
3. (Romania) Adrian Ungur (first round)
4. (Italy) Filippo Volandri (second round)
5. (Romania) Victor Hănescu (second round)
6. (Italy) Potito Starace (quarterfinals)
7. (Italy) Marco Cecchinato (first round)
8. (Italy) Andrea Arnaboldi (first round)

== Draw ==
=== Key ===
- Q = Qualifier
- WC = Wild card
- LL = Lucky loser
- Alt = Alternate
- SE = Special exempt
- PR = Protected ranking
- ITF = ITF entry
- JE = Junior exempt
- w/o = Walkover
- r = Retired
- d = Defaulted
- SR = Special ranking

=== Finals ===
Semifinals
Q	(Serbia) Viktor Troicki	6	6
Q	(Estonia) Jürgen Zopp	3	4
(Republic of Ireland) Louk Sorensen	4	6	6
(Serbia) Ilija Bozoljac	6	2	4

Final
Q	(Serbia) Viktor Troicki	6	6
(Republic of Ireland) Louk Sorensen	3	2

=== Top half ===
First round
1	(Argentina) F Argüello	6	6
(France) A Michon	1	2
(Spain) E López Pérez	6^{0}	6	6^{4}
(France) G Burquier	7^{7}	1	7^{7}
Alt	(Bosnia and Herzegovina) M Bašić	1	7	4
Q	(Serbia) V Troicki	6	5	6
(Croatia) T Androić	6	3	6
8	(Italy) A Arnaboldi	4	6	4
4	(Italy) F Volandri	6	6
(Canada) S Diez	3	2
Q	(Estonia) J Zopp	6	6
(France) J Eysseric	2	2
Q	(Sweden) P Rosenholm	6	3	4
WC	(Italy) S Caruso	4	6	6
(Italy) L Giustino	2	4
6	(Italy) P Starace	6	6

Second round
1	(Argentina) F Argüello	6	7
(France) G Burquier	2	5
Q	(Serbia) V Troicki	6	6
(Croatia) T Androić	3	4
4	(Italy) F Volandri	3	1
Q	(Estonia) J Zopp	6	6
WC	(Italy) S Caruso	2	2
6	(Italy) P Starace	6	6

Quarterfinals
1	(Argentina) F Argüello	3	2
Q	(Serbia) V Troicki	6	6
Q	(Estonia) J Zopp	3	7^{7}	6
6	(Italy) P Starace	6	6^{4}	0

Semifinals
Q	(Serbia) V Troicki	6	6
Q	(Estonia) J Zopp	3	4

=== Bottom half ===
First round
5	(Romania) V Hănescu	6	4	6
(Czech Republic) J Hájek	4	6	3
Q	(Serbia) B Pašanski	6	6
WC	(Italy) A Giannessi	4	2
(Italy) F Gaio	5	3
(Republic of Ireland) L Sorensen	7	6
(Argentina) G Andreozzi	7	7
3	(Romania) A Ungur	5	5
7	(Italy) M Cecchinato	3	6^{5}
(Serbia) I Bozoljac	6	7^{7}
(Croatia) M Delić	7^{7}	1	6
WC	(Italy) Pietro Licciardi	6^{5}	6	3
(Netherlands) B Westerhof	2	0r
(Sweden) C Lindell	6	3
WC	(Italy) M Donati	2	3
2/Alt	(France) P-H Herbert	6	6

Second round
5	(Romania) V Hănescu	4	6	4
Q	(Serbia) B Pašanski	6	1	6
(Republic of Ireland) L Sorensen	4	7	6
(Argentina) G Andreozzi	6	5	1
(Serbia) I Bozoljac	7^{7}	7
(Croatia) M Delić	6^{4}	5
(Sweden) C Lindell	7^{7}	5	7^{7}
2/Alt	(France) P-H Herbert	6^{3}	7	6^{2}

Quarterfinals
Q	(Serbia) B Pašanski	4	1
(Republic of Ireland) L Sorensen	6	6
(Serbia) I Bozoljac	6	4	7
(Sweden) C Lindell	4	6	5

Semifinals
(Republic of Ireland) L Sorensen	4	6	6
(Serbia) I Bozoljac	6	2	4
