= 2009 PBZ Zagreb Indoors – Singles =

Singles
- 2009 PBZ Zagreb Indoors

Final
- Champion: (Croatia) Marin Čilić
- Runner-up: (Croatia) Mario Ančić
- Score: 6–3, 6–4

Details
- Draw: 32
- Seeds: 8

Events
Singles	Doubles
- PBZ Zagreb Indoors

Sergiy Stakhovsky was the defending champion, but lost in the quarterfinals to Viktor Troicki.

== Seeds ==
1. (Russia) Igor Andreev (first round)
2. (Croatia) Marin Čilić (champion)
3. (Croatia) Ivo Karlović (second round)
4. (France) Paul-Henri Mathieu (second round)
5. (Austria) Jürgen Melzer (first round)
6. (Italy) Andreas Seppi (first round)
7. (Croatia) Mario Ančić (Runner-up)
8. (Italy) Simone Bolelli (first round)

== Draw ==
Key

- Q = Qualifier
- WC = Wild card
- LL = Lucky loser
- Alt = Alternate
- ITF = ITF entry
- PR = Protected ranking
- SR = Special ranking
- SE = Special exempt
- JE = Junior exempt
- JR = Junior Accelerator Programme entrant
- CO = College Accelerator Programme entrant
- NG = Next Gen Accelerator Program entrant
- w/o = Walkover
- r = Retired
- d = Defaulted

=== Finals ===
Semifinals
7	(Croatia) Mario Ančić	6^{4}	6	7^{11}
(Czech Republic) Jan Hernych	7^{7}	3	6^{9}
(Serbia) Viktor Troicki	2	5
2	(Croatia) Marin Čilić	6	7

Final
7	(Croatia) Mario Ančić	3	4
2	(Croatia) Marin Čilić	6	6

=== Top half ===
First round
1	(Russia) I Andreev	1	4
Q	(Croatia) I Dodig	6	6
Q	(Russia) D Tursunov	6	4	4
(Latvia) E Gulbis	4	6	6
(Russia) T Gabashvili	6	6
(Russia) M Youzhny	3	4
Q	(Slovakia) L Lacko	4	7^{8}	5
7	(Croatia) M Ančić	6	6^{6}	7
4	(France) P-H Mathieu	6^{6}	6	7^{7}
(Croatia) R Karanušić	7^{8}	1	6^{3}
WC	(Croatia) N Mektić	3	5
(Czech Republic) J Hernych	6	7
WC	(Croatia) L Zovko	3	5
(Romania) V Hănescu	6	7
(Germany) M Zverev	7^{7}	3	6
6	(Italy) A Seppi	6^{4}	6	2

Second round
Q	(Croatia) I Dodig	7^{7}	6
(Latvia) E Gulbis	6^{3}	4
(Russia) T Gabashvili	1	1
7	(Croatia) M Ančić	6	6
4	(France) P-H Mathieu	7^{9}	4	2
(Czech Republic) J Hernych	6^{7}	6	6
(Romania) V Hănescu	4	7	6^{7}
(Germany) M Zverev	6	5	7^{9}

Quarterfinals
Q	(Croatia) I Dodig	1	3
7	(Croatia) M Ančić	6	6
(Czech Republic) J Hernych	5
(Germany) M Zverev	4^{r}

Semifinals
7	(Croatia) M Ančić	6^{4}	6	7^{11}
(Czech Republic) J Hernych	7^{7}	3	6^{9}

=== Bottom half ===
First round
8	(Italy) S Bolelli	3	4
(Serbia) V Troicki	6	6
(Croatia) I Ljubičić	6	6
(Belgium) C Rochus	4	1
Q	(Slovakia) D Hrbatý	2	6	1
(Ukraine) S Stakhovsky	6	4	6
(Germany) P Petzschner	3	4
3	(Croatia) I Karlović	6	6
5	(Austria) J Melzer	4	0
(Russia) E Korolev	6	6
(Argentina) G Cañas	6	4	2
WC	(Croatia) A Veić	4	6	6
(France) M Gicquel	2	6	6^{2}
(France) F Serra	6	4	7^{7}
(France) A Clément	4	3
2	(Croatia) M Čilić	6	6

Second round
(Serbia) V Troicki	6	5	6
(Croatia) I Ljubičić	4	7	4
(Ukraine) S Stakhovsky	6	3	6
3	(Croatia) I Karlović	4	6	3
(Russia) E Korolev	6	6^{5}	4
WC	(Croatia) A Veić	3	7^{7}	6
(France) F Serra	2	5
2	(Croatia) M Čilić	6	7

Quarterfinals
(Serbia) V Troicki	6	6
(Ukraine) S Stakhovsky	3	2
WC	(Croatia) A Veić	2	6^{6}
2	(Croatia) M Čilić	6	7^{8}

Semifinals
(Serbia) V Troicki	2	5
2	(Croatia) M Čilić	6	7

== Qualifying ==
=== Seeds ===
1. (Russia) Dmitry Tursunov (qualified)
2. (Austria) Alexander Peya (qualifying competition)
3. (Netherlands) Jesse Huta Galung (qualifying competition)
4. (Austria) Stefan Koubek (second round)
5. (Turkey) Marsel İlhan (second round)
6. (Austria) Martin Fischer (qualifying competition)
7. (Germany) Matthias Bachinger (second round)
8. (Italy) Marco Crugnola (first round)

=== Qualifiers ===
1. (Russia) Dmitry Tursunov
2. (Slovakia) Dominik Hrbatý
3. (Slovakia) Lukáš Lacko
4. (Croatia) Ivan Dodig

== Qualifying draw ==
=== First qualifier ===
First round
1	(Russia) Dmitry Tursunov	7	7^{7}
(Netherlands) Thiemo de Bakker	5	6^{1}
(Italy) Massimo Dell'Acqua	1	1
WC	(Croatia) Luka Belić	6	6
(Slovakia) Pavol Červenák	3	2
(Switzerland) George Bastl	6	6
WC	(Croatia) Silvio Dadic	3	2
7	(Germany) Matthias Bachinger	6	6

Second round
1	(Russia) Dmitry Tursunov	6	7^{7}
WC	(Croatia) Luka Belić	2	6^{5}
(Switzerland) George Bastl	6	6
7	(Germany) Matthias Bachinger	0	1

Qualifying competition
1	(Russia) Dmitry Tursunov	6	7^{7}
(Switzerland) George Bastl	2	6^{3}

=== Second qualifier ===
First round
2	(Austria) Alexander Peya	6	6
(Italy) Luca Vanni	0	0
WC	(Croatia) Kristijan Mesaroš	3	6^{5}
(Croatia) Franko Škugor	6	7^{7}
(Slovakia) Dominik Hrbatý	0	6	6
(Monaco) Jean-René Lisnard	6	1	2
(Slovenia) Marko Tkalec	6^{1}	6^{2}
5	(Turkey) Marsel İlhan	7^{7}	7^{7}

Second round
2	(Austria) Alexander Peya	6	6
(Croatia) Franko Škugor	0	4
(Slovakia) Dominik Hrbatý	7	6
5	(Turkey) Marsel İlhan	5	2

Qualifying competition
2	(Austria) Alexander Peya	6^{2}	4
(Slovakia) Dominik Hrbatý	7^{7}	6

=== Third qualifier ===
First round
3	(Netherlands) Jesse Huta Galung	7	2	7
(Sweden) Filip Prpic	5	6	5
(Serbia) Dušan Vemić	7^{13}	2	3
(Croatia) Antonio Šančić	6^{11}	6	6
WC	(Croatia) Joško Topić	6	6^{2}	7^{7}
(Latvia) Andis Juška	3	7^{7}	6^{5}
(Slovakia) Lukáš Lacko	7^{9}	6
8	(Italy) Marco Crugnola	6^{7}	2

Second round
3	(Netherlands) Jesse Huta Galung	6	7^{7}
(Croatia) Antonio Šančić	4	6^{4}
WC	(Croatia) Joško Topić	4	2
(Slovakia) Lukáš Lacko	6	6

Qualifying competition
3	(Netherlands) Jesse Huta Galung	7^{9}	4	0
(Slovakia) Lukáš Lacko	6^{7}	6	6

=== Fourth qualifier ===
First round
4	(Austria) Stefan Koubek	6	6
(Italy) Thomas Fabbiano	3	1
(Netherlands) Matwé Middelkoop	3	6^{8}
(Croatia) Ivan Dodig	6	7^{10}
(Bulgaria) Ivaylo Traykov	2	2
(Austria) Rainer Eitzinger	6	6
(Germany) Tobias Kamke	2	1
6	(Austria) Martin Fischer	6	6

Second round
4	(Austria) Stefan Koubek	6	4	6^{1}
(Croatia) Ivan Dodig	3	6	7^{7}
(Austria) Rainer Eitzinger	3	5
6	(Austria) Martin Fischer	6	7

Qualifying competition
(Croatia) Ivan Dodig	6	7
6	(Austria) Martin Fischer	1	5
