= 2009 PBZ Zagreb Indoors =

- Date: 2–8 February
- Edition: 7th
- Category: ATP World Tour 250 series
- Draw: 32S / 16D
- Prize money: €450,000
- Surface: Hard / indoor
- Location: Zagreb, Croatia
- Venue: Dom Sportova

Champions

Singles
- (Croatia) Marin Čilić

Doubles
- (Czech Republic) Martin Damm / (Sweden) Robert Lindstedt
- PBZ Zagreb Indoors

The 2009 PBZ Zagreb Indoors was an ATP men's tennis tournament played on indoor hard courts. It was the seventh overall edition of the PBZ Zagreb Indoors, and part of the ATP World Tour 250 series of the 2009 ATP World Tour. It took place in Zagreb, Croatia from 2 February through 8 February 2009.

The singles line up was led by world No. 19 Igor Andreev and Croats Marin Čilić and Ivo Karlović. Also competing were Paul-Henri Mathieu, Jürgen Melzer, Andreas Seppi, Mario Ančić and Simone Bolelli.

== Finals ==
=== Singles ===
(Croatia) Marin Čilić defeated (Croatia) Mario Ančić 6–3, 6–4

- It was Cilic's 2nd title of the year and 3rd of his career.

=== Doubles ===
(Czech Republic) Martin Damm / (Sweden) Robert Lindstedt defeated (Germany) Christopher Kas / (Netherlands) Rogier Wassen 6–4, 6–3
