= 2016 Garanti Koza Sofia Open =

- Date: 1–7 February
- Edition: 1st
- Category: ATP World Tour 250 series
- Draw: 28S / 16D
- Prize money: €463,520
- Surface: Hard / indoor
- Location: Sofia, Bulgaria
- Venue: Arena Armeec

Champions

Singles
- (Spain) Roberto Bautista Agut

Doubles
- (Netherlands) Wesley Koolhof / (Netherlands) Matwé Middelkoop
- Sofia Open

The 2016 Sofia Open (also known as 2016 Garanti Koza Sofia Open for sponsorship reasons) was a men's tennis tournament played on indoor hard courts. It was the inaugural edition of the Sofia Open as part of the ATP World Tour 250 series of the 2016 ATP World Tour. It took place at the Arena Armeec in Sofia, Bulgaria, from 1 February until 7 February 2016. First-seeded Roberto Bautista Agut won the singles title.

== Finals ==
=== Singles ===
- (Spain) Roberto Bautista Agut defeated (Serbia) Viktor Troicki 6–3, 6–4

=== Doubles ===
- (Netherlands) Wesley Koolhof / (Netherlands) Matwé Middelkoop defeated (Austria) Philipp Oswald / (Canada) Adil Shamasdin 5–7, 7–6^{(11–9)}, [10–6]

== Points and prize money ==
=== Point distribution ===
Event	W	F	SF	QF	Round of 16	Round of 32	Q	Q2	Q1
Singles	250	150	90	45	20	0	12	6	0
Doubles	250	150	90	45	0	—N/a	—N/a	—N/a	—N/a

=== Prize money ===
Event	W	F	SF	QF	Round of 16	Round of 32	Q2	Q1
Singles	€82,450	€43,430	€23,525	€13,400	€7,900	€4,680	€2,105	€1,055
Doubles	€25,070	€13,170	€7,140	€4,080	€2,390	—N/a	—N/a	—N/a
Doubles prize money per team

== Singles main-draw entrants ==
=== Seeds ===
Country	Player	Rank^{1}	Seed
ESP	Roberto Bautista Agut	21	1
SRB	Viktor Troicki	26	2
ESP	Guillermo García López	27	3
ITA	Andreas Seppi	29	4
GER	Philipp Kohlschreiber	34	5
LUX	Gilles Müller	38	6
SVK	Martin Kližan	43	7
FRA	Adrian Mannarino	48	8

- ^{1} Rankings were as of January 18, 2016

=== Other entrants ===
The following players received wildcards into the singles main draw:

- (Turkey) Marsel İlhan
- (Bulgaria) Dimitar Kuzmanov
- (Bulgaria) Alexandar Lazov

The following players received entry from the qualifying draw:

- (Bosnia and Herzegovina) Mirza Bašić
- (Germany) Daniel Brands
- (Romania) Marius Copil
- (Italy) Thomas Fabbiano

=== Withdrawals ===
Before the tournament

- (Italy) Simone Bolelli →replaced by (Netherlands) Thiemo de Bakker
- (Serbia) Janko Tipsarević →replaced by (Serbia) Filip Krajinović

During the tournament

- (Serbia) Filip Krajinović (right shoulder injury)

== Doubles main-draw entrants ==
=== Seeds ===
Country	Player	Country	Player	Rank^{1}	Seed
GER	Philipp Petzschner	AUT	Alexander Peya	71	1
CRO	Marin Draganja	AUT	Julian Knowle	103	2
NED	Wesley Koolhof	NED	Matwé Middelkoop	125	3
BLR	Sergey Betov	RUS	Mikhail Elgin	134	4

- ^{1} Rankings were as of January 18, 2016

=== Other entrants ===
The following pairs received wildcards into the doubles main draw:

- (Turkey) Tuna Altuna / (Russia) Konstantin Kravchuk
- (Bulgaria) Dimitar Kuzmanov / (Bulgaria) Alexandar Lazov
