= Viktor Troicki =

Serbian tennis player (born 1986)

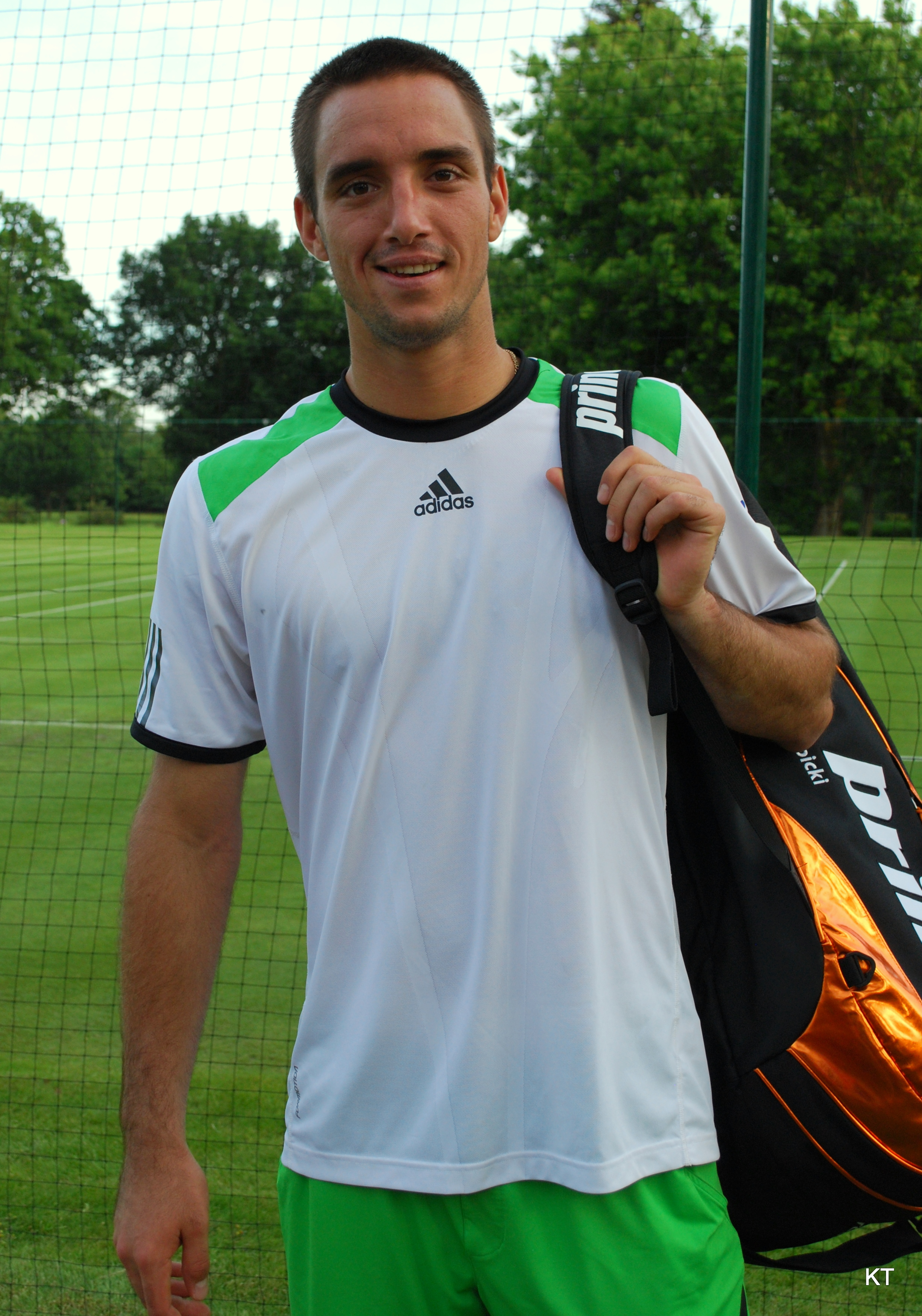
- Country (sports): Serbia
- Residence: Belgrade, Serbia
- Born: 10 February 1986 (age 40) Belgrade, SR Serbia, SFR Yugoslavia
- Height: 1.93 m (6 ft 4 in)
- Turned pro: 2006
- Retired: 2021
- Plays: Right-handed (two-handed backhand)
- Coach: Jan De Witt (2005–2012); Boris Pašanski (2017–2018); Jack Reader (2012–2017, 2018–2021)
- Prize money: US$ 9,265,938
- Official website: viktortroicki.com

Singles
- Career record: 294–273
- Career titles: 3
- Highest ranking: No. 12 (6 June 2011)

Grand Slam singles results
- Australian Open: 3R (2011, 2015, 2016, 2017)
- French Open: 4R (2011, 2013, 2016)
- Wimbledon: 4R (2012, 2015)
- US Open: 3R (2008, 2015, 2017)

Other tournaments
- Olympic Games: 1R (2012, 2016)

Doubles
- Career record: 111–153
- Career titles: 2
- Highest ranking: No. 49 (25 October 2010)

Grand Slam doubles results
- Australian Open: 2R (2017)
- French Open: QF (2008)
- Wimbledon: 3R (2009)
- US Open: 2R (2012)

Other doubles tournaments
- Olympic Games: 1R (2012)

Team competitions
- Davis Cup: W (2010)

Coaching career (2021–)
- Serbia Davis Cup team (2021–) Hamad Medjedovic (2022–2024) Miomir Kecmanović (2025–2026) Novak Djokovic (2026–)

Viktor Troicki (Serbian Cyrillic: Виктор Троицки, pronounced [ʋîktor troǐtskiː]; born 10 February 1986) is a Serbian tennis coach and a former professional player. He won three singles and two doubles titles on the ATP Tour. Troicki won his first ATP singles title at the 2010 Kremlin Cup, and his second and third ATP singles titles at the 2015 and 2016 Apia International Sydney. His biggest achievements were a career-high singles ranking of world No. 12 (achieved in June 2011) and winning the deciding rubber in Serbia's Davis Cup final against France in 2010. Since then, in every Davis Cup he attended, he has contributed to Serbia reaching a quarterfinal or better. He is known for serving a 12-month ban for an anti-doping rule violation in 2013–14 for missing a blood test. By winning the inaugural ATP Cup in 2020, Troicki became the first player in tennis Open Era history to win all three major team competitions (Davis Cup in 2010 and World Team Cup in 2009 and 2012). In December 2020, Troicki was appointed captain of the Serbian team for the Davis Cup and ATP Cup.

== Early life ==
Troicki was born on 10 February 1986 in Belgrade, SR Serbia, SFR Yugoslavia to a lawyer father, Aleksandar, and economist mother, Mila. Of paternal Russian descent and Serbian mother, Troicki grew up in the Dorćol neighborhood of Belgrade.

Viktor grew up playing soccer and started playing tennis in his hometown of Belgrade at the age of five. His childhood idol was Andre Agassi.

== Career ==
=== Juniors ===
As a junior, Troicki compiled a singles win–loss record of 68–31 (52–20 in doubles) and reached a combined ranking of No. 10 in the junior world rankings in October 2004.

Junior Grand Slam results – Singles:

Australian Open: –
French Open: 3R (2004)
Wimbledon: 2R (2004)
US Open: QF (2004)

Junior Grand Slam results – Doubles:

Australian Open: –
French Open: 1R (2004)
Wimbledon: F (2004)
US Open: SF (2004)

=== 2003–2007 ===
In 2003, Troicki began playing Futures tournaments in Serbia, and in August 2004, won his first title in Niš. He won his second Futures title in Belgrade in June 2005, defeating Fabio Colangelo in the final. In September that year, ranked No. 490, he reached his first Challenger final in Banja Luka, losing to world No. 139 Vasilis Mazarakis.

In April 2006, Troicki won his first Challenger title in Dharwad, India, defeating Łukasz Kubot in the final. In October that year, ranked No. 276, he qualified for the Japan Open and recorded his first ATP main-draw win with a 6–7, 6–4, 6–2 victory over world No. 99 Fernando Vicente; this was his first win over an opponent ranked in the top 100. He lost 6–7, 6–7 in the second round to world No. 1 and eventual champion Roger Federer.

In July 2007, as a qualifier in the Croatian Open Umag, he recorded his first top 10 win when he defeated world No. 3 and fellow countryman Novak Djokovic in the second round 2–6, 6–4, 7–5, before eventually losing to Romanian Andrei Pavel in the semifinals.

=== 2008: First ATP final ===
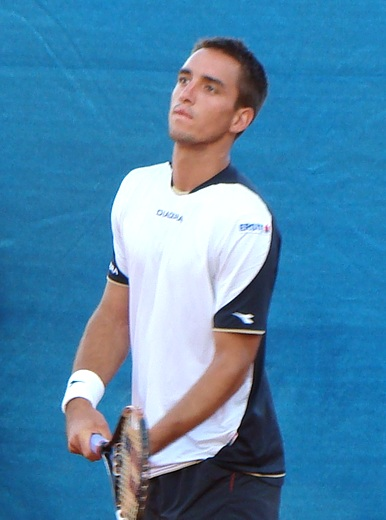
Troicki in Umag

Troicki's first Grand Slam tournament came when he advanced as a qualifier in the Australian Open. Facing second seed Rafael Nadal in the first round, he played a tight match and held a set point in the first set, but lost 6–7, 5–7, 1–6.

He then represented Serbia in the Davis Cup against Russia, losing to Nikolay Davydenko 1–6, 6–1, 3–6, 6–1, 2–6, and defeating Dmitry Tursunov 7–6, 4–6, 6–3.

Troicki's next appearance was at the ATP Masters Series in Miami. He faced Andy Roddick in the second round. Troicki took the first set from Roddick, where he attempted an angled drop shot which Roddick returned it with an even more angled shot on his backhand. After this, it seemed to go downhill for Troicki, and he eventually lost 7–5, 2–6, 4–6. He then competed in the Torneo Godó, where he retired against Nicolás Almagro 2–6, ret. In his French Open debut, he lost in the opening round to Marc Gicquel 4–6, 3–6, 6–4, 5–7. He then competed in three straight tournaments, in the Queen's Club Championships losing to David Nalbandian in the second round, in the Ordina Open, losing to Guillermo Cañas in the quarterfinals, and in the Wimbledon Championships to Radek Štěpánek in the second round, after winning the first two sets 7–6, 7–6, 3–6, 1–6, 2–6.

Following Wimbledon, Troicki competed at the Croatia Open, losing to Carlos Moyá in the second round.

He then reached his first ATP final in Washington, D.C. at the Legg Mason Tennis Classic. Troicki defeated American Bobby Reynolds in the round of 16 to reach the quarterfinals, where he defeated Andy Roddick, the defending champion and top-seeded American 0–6, 6–2, 6–4, to reach the semifinals, where he defeated Igor Kunitsyn. In the final, he lost to second seed Juan Martín del Potro, 3–6, 3–6.

At the US Open, Troicki defeated Carsten Ball in the first round and Philipp Kohlschreiber in the second round, before losing to Rafael Nadal.

He then represented Serbia again in the Davis Cup against Slovakia, winning his only match against Lukáš Lacko 6–3, 6–4. He then competed in the Thailand Open, losing to Jürgen Melzer in the second round, in the Japan Open, losing to Andy Roddick, and the Kremlin Cup, losing to Mischa Zverev, both in the quarterfinals. He ended the year losing in the first round of the St. Petersburg and Paris Masters. He ended the year No. 56 in the world.

=== 2009: Second ATP final & ARAG World Team Cup title ===
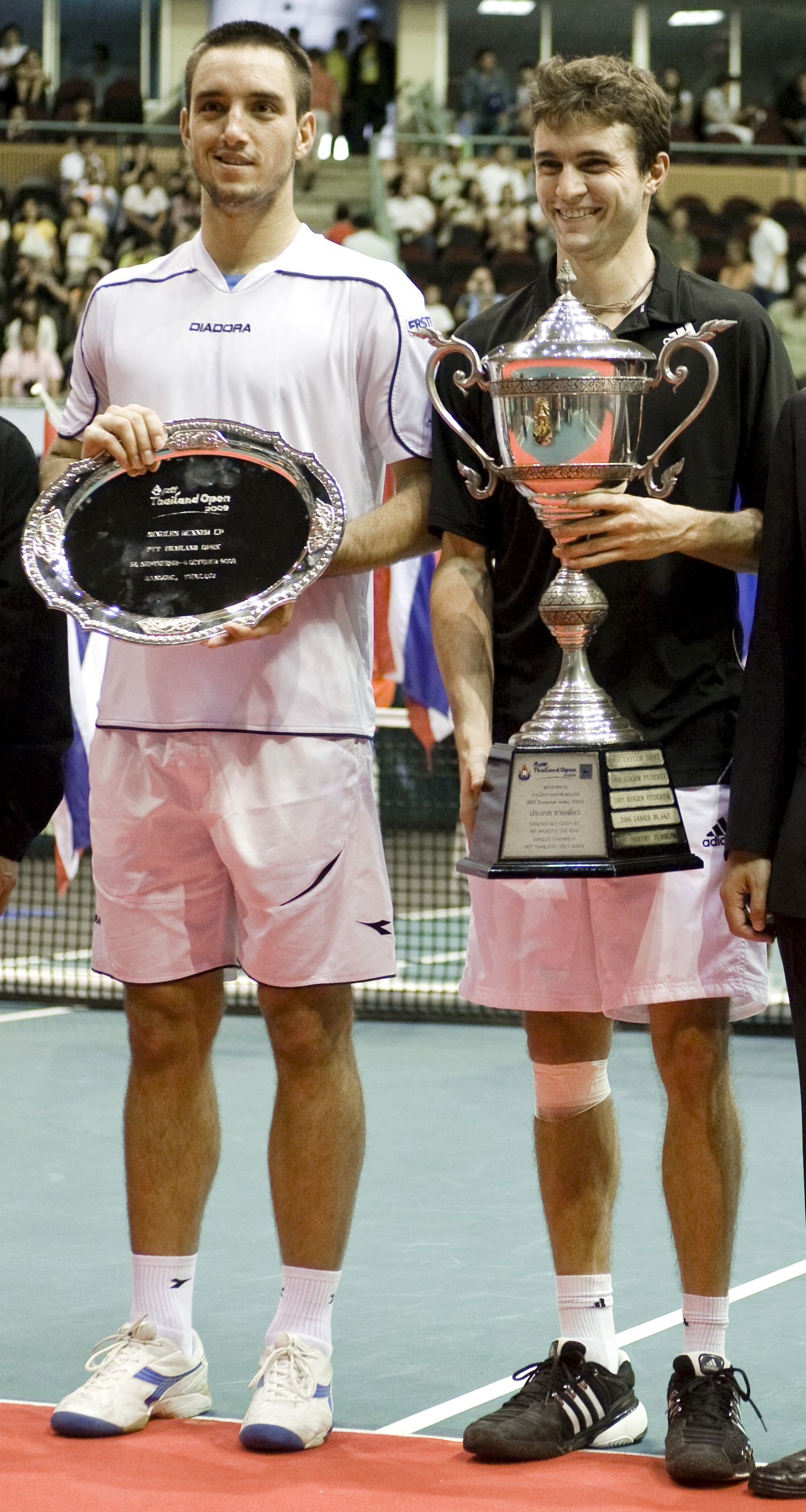
Troicki (left) at the Thailand Open

In January 2009, he lost in first round of the Qatar Open to Victor Hănescu and in the quarterfinals of Auckland Open to del Potro. In second round of the Australian Open, he was crushed by Tommy Robredo, 6–1, 6–3, 6–0. After that, Troicki made a good result in the Zagreb Indoors. He lost in the semifinals to Marin Čilić, 2–6, 5–7. Also in February, Troicki won the GEMAX Open, a Tretorn Series + Challenger held in Belgrade. In the final, he defeated Dominik Hrbatý in two sets.

In March 2009, Troicki played for the Serbian Davis Cup team, losing to David Ferrer 0–6, 3–6. He then competed in the next four Masters Series. In the BNP Paribas Open, he lost to David Nalbandian in the third round 4–6, 2–6. In the Miami Masters, he reached the fourth round before Andy Murray defeated him 6–1, 6–0. He then lost in the first round to Stan Wawrinka in the Monte Carlo Masters, and in the Rome Masters to Juan Martín del Potro in the second round. Troicki competed in the first tournament of his home nation in the Serbia Open, losing to compatriot Novak Djokovic. In the Madrid Masters, he lost to Nikolay Davydenko 2–6, 2–6, in the opener. He then represented Serbia in the ARAG World Team Cup, helping Serbia to win the title by beating Rainer Schüttler in the finals. In the French Open, he lost to fifth seed and eventual semifinalist Juan Martín del Potro in the second round 3–6, 5–7, 0–6, after defeating Łukasz Kubot in a tight five-setter 3–6, 6–3, 6–4, 6–7, 6–3.

Troicki was seeded for the first time in a Grand Slam tournament in Wimbledon Championships, as 30th seed, beating Brian Dabul in straight sets in the first, and winning a five-setter against Daniel Gimeno Traver in the second round. He lost to Andy Murray in the third round. He then competed in the German Open in Hamburg, losing to eventual finalist Paul-Henri Mathieu 0–3 ret., in the quarterfinals due to a foot injury he suffered when he fell hard in the start of the match. He then lost to Máximo González in Umag in the first round 4–6, 6–3, 6–7. He lost to Marc Gicquel in the second round of the Legg Mason Tennis Classic, 0–3 ret., due to his recurring foot injury suffered in Hamburg after receiving a bye in the first round. He then lost to Ferrer in the first round of the Rogers Masters 3–6, 0–6, and retired in the first round of the Western & Southern Financial Group Masters against Radek Štěpánek, 7–6, 1–0 ret. He had recorded five straight loses. Troicki competed in the US Open as 30th seed and claimed his first victory since Hamburg, defeating Peter Luczak 6–3, 6–3, 1–6, 2–6, 6–1, in the first round, but lost to Julien Benneteau in the following round. He then competed in the 2009 Davis Cup Play-offs, where he won both his matches against Uzbekistan.

Troicki reached another final in the Thailand Open. After defeating Thomaz Bellucci, 6–3, 7–6 in the round of 16, he then defeated eighth-seeded American John Isner 7–6, 6–2, in the quarterfinals. In his semifinal match, he went on to upset the defending 2008 Bangkok champion, 2008 Australian Open finalist, and top seed Jo-Wilfried Tsonga, 1–6, 6–2, 6–3 to reach his second ATP World Tour final to face the second seeded Gilles Simon. He lost 5–7, 3–6. He then competed in the 2009 China Open, where he lost in the second round to compatriot and eventual champion Novak Djokovic 3–6, 0–6. He then competed in the Shanghai ATP Masters 1000, where he lost to eighth seed Gilles Simon, 3–6, 4–6, after defeating Juan Mónaco 6–1, 6–2, in the first round. He was then upset by Karol Beck in the first round of the St. Petersburg Open, marking his 10th first-round loss in 25 tournaments. He then defeated Benjamin Becker 6–2, 7–6, before losing to Marin Čilić in the second round in a close three setter 6–7, 7–6, 6–7, in the Swiss Indoors. He played his last tournament in the BNP Paribas Masters, losing in the second round to Radek Štěpánek 4–6, 2–6, after defeating Paul-Henri Mathieu 7–6, 3–0 ret.

=== 2010: First ATP and Davis Cup title ===
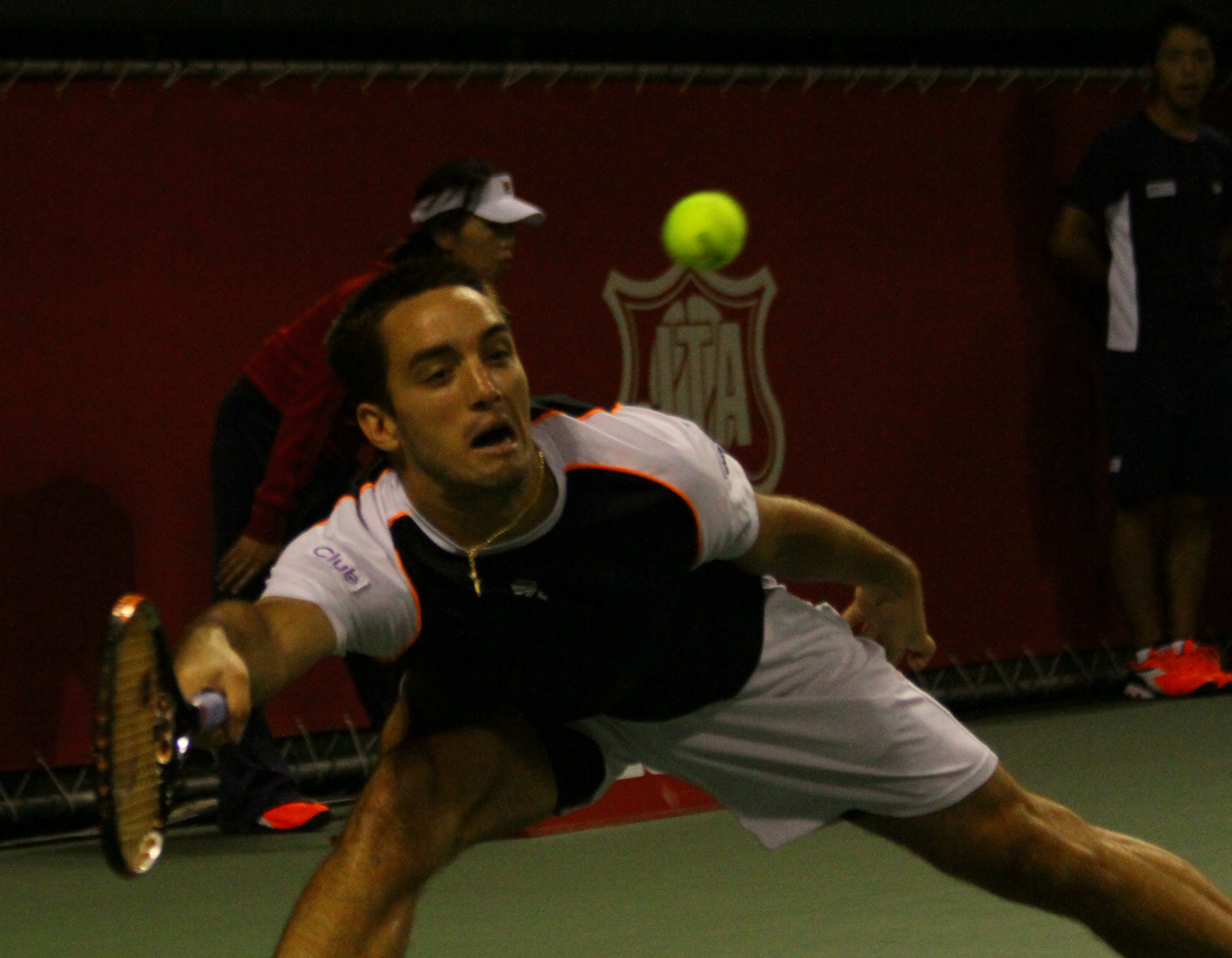
Troicki at the 2010 Japan Open

Troicki began the year by competing in the Qatar Open as the fifth seed, where he advanced to the semifinals after defeating Daniel Gimeno Traver 6–1, 7–5, Olivier Rochus 6–2, 6–2, and Łukasz Kubot 4–6, 6–4, 7–6, but lost to Rafael Nadal 1–6, 3–6. At the Medibank International Sydney, he beat Florent Serra 7–6, 6–4, in the first round and lost to Marcos Baghdatis in the second round 5–7, 3–6. He then lost in the second round of the Australian Open to Florian Mayer 6–4, 4–6, 6–7, 1–6. In the Zagreb Indoors, he was upset by Michael Berrer 4–6, 3–6, in the quarterfinals, after defeating Rainer Schüttler 6–3, 6–2, and Mikhail Kukushkin 7–5, 7–5. He then retired against Jürgen Melzer in the first round of the ABN AMRO World Tennis Tournament due to an elbow injury, being 3–6, 0–3 down. He then competed in the Dubai Tennis Championships, where he lost to compatriot Novak Djokovic in the second round. In the BNP Paribas Open, he lost in the fourth round to Tomáš Berdych 1–6, 3–6, having only played and won one game in the previous rounds, as he received a bye when his second round opponent Pablo Cuevas retired after one game and Nikolay Davydenko withdrew. In the Sony Ericsson Open, he lost to David Nalbandian in a close match 3–6, 6–4, 4–6, in the second round, after receiving a bye.

At the start of the clay season, Troicki competed in the Monte-Carlo Masters, losing to 12th seed Tommy Robredo in the second round, after defeating Łukasz Kubot 4–6, 6–2, 6–2.

In October 2010, Troicki won his first ATP doubles title at the Thailand Open partnering Christopher Kas, and a few weeks later, won his first ATP singles title at the Kremlin Cup in Moscow, defeating Marcos Baghdatis in the final 3–6, 6–4, 6–3. On his road to the title, he defeated Dmitry Tursunov, Jo-Wilfried Tsonga, Horacio Zeballos, and Pablo Cuevas.

Troicki was part of Serbia's Davis Cup team that reached the final for the first time in their history in 2010. He was initially overlooked for the singles rubbers, but after compatriot Janko Tipsarević was beaten by Gaël Monfils in straight sets, Troicki was chosen to play the final singles rubber, as well as the doubles. With Serbia and France tied at 2–2, Troicki won the deciding match 6–2, 6–2, 6–3, against Michaël Llodra to clinch Serbia's first Davis Cup.

=== 2011: Masters quarterfinal & reaching top 15 ===
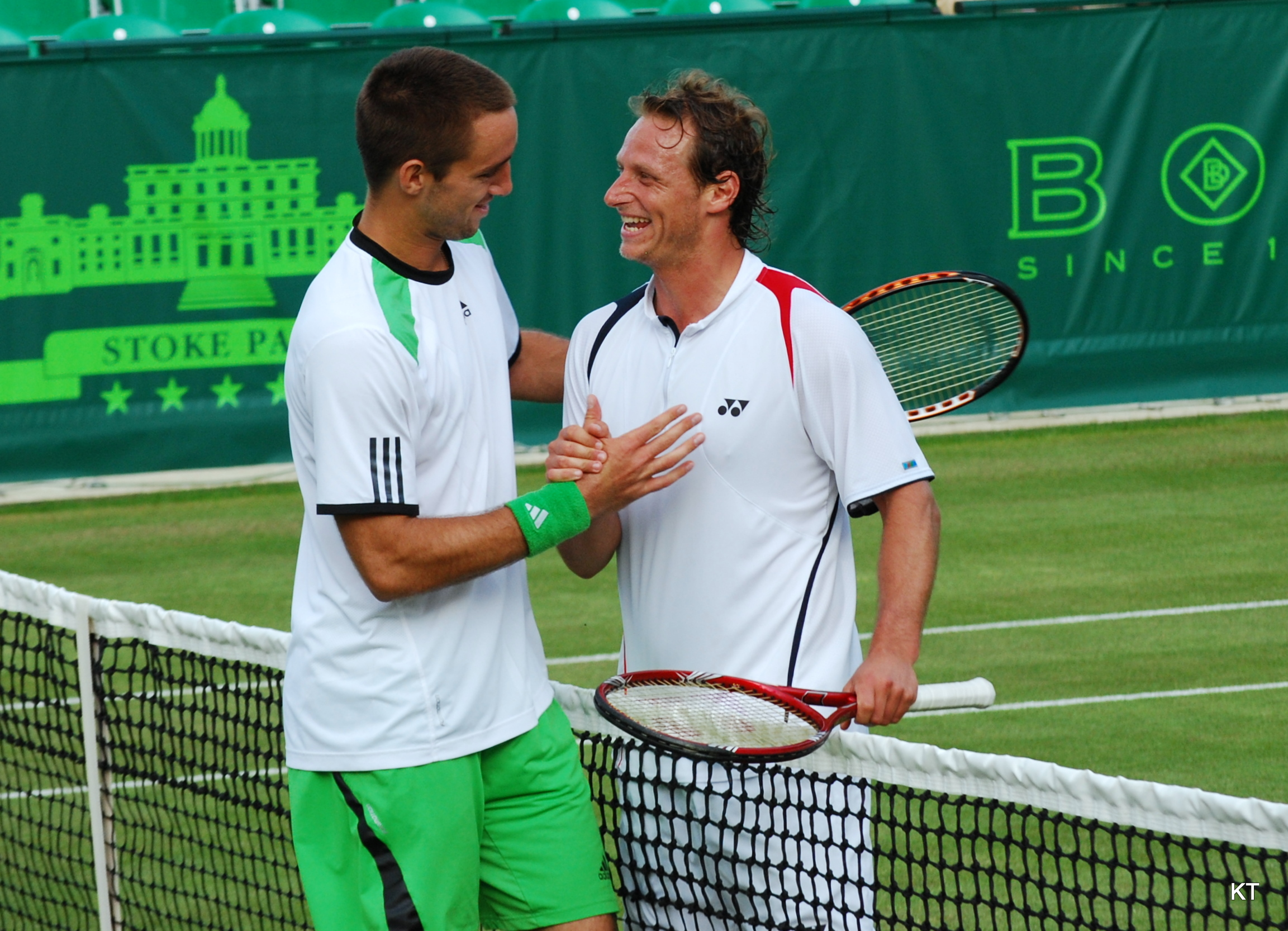
Troicki (left) in 2011

Troicki started 2011 in ATP Doha, where he lost to eventual champion Roger Federer 2–6, 2–6, in the quarterfinals. Troicki advanced to the finals of the Sydney International, where he defeated Juan Ignacio Chela, Richard Gasquet, and Florian Mayer, before losing to Gilles Simon 5–7, 6–7. Then at the Australian Open, he reached the third round for the first time, but retired against compatriot and eventual champion Novak Djokovic due to stomach pain after losing the first set 2–6. He next played at the ABN AMRO World Tennis Tournament and reached the semifinals without dropping a set, but fell to Robin Söderling 5–7, 4–6. He then fell to Philipp Kohlschreiber 1–6, 6–7, in the first round of the Dubai Tennis Championships. He represented Serbia in the first round of 2011 Davis Cup and won both his matches. He then played the Masters 1000 events, the BNP Paribas Open and the Sony Ericsson Open, falling to eventual champion Novak Djokovic in the fourth round in both tournaments. He then reached his first Masters 1000 quarterfinals at the Monte-Carlo Masters, losing to David Ferrer 3–6, 3–6, after his opponent in the previous round Tommy Robredo retired while leading the match 6–3, 1–2. He then suffered early losses in the Serbia Open, the Madrid Open, and the Italian Open. Troicki then represented Serbia in the World Team Cup, winning his matches against Mikhail Youzhny and Marcel Granollers, but losing his match to Florian Mayer. At the French Open, Troicki reached his first Grand Slam fourth round with wins over Julian Reister, Tobias Kamke, and Alexandr Dolgopolov. In the fourth round, he faced fourth seed Andy Murray, where he lost 6–4, 6–4, 3–6, 2–6, 5–7, despite serving for the match at 5–3 and 30–0 in the final set in a match that was played over two days. He then reached a new career high of no. 12.

At the Gerry Weber Open, Troicki defeated Mischa Zverev and Igor Andreev, before losing to Tomáš Berdych 6–7, 1–6, in the quarterfinal. Troicki reached the second round at Wimbledon, defeating Máximo González, 3–6, 6–0, 7–6, 6–3, before losing to Lu Yen-hsun 6–7, 4–6, 4–6. At the Legg Mason Tennis Classic, Troicki reached the quarterfinals, defeating Ryan Harrison and Kevin Anderson, but lost to John Isner 6–7, 6–3, 1–6. Next, Troicki played at the Rogers Cup, defeating Michael Yani 2–6, 6–3, 6–1, and John Isner 6–4, 3–6, 6–2, before losing to Gaël Monfils 6–3, 6–7, 6–7, in the third round.

In the US Open, he lost in the first round to Colombian Alejandro Falla. In Moscow in the first all-Serbian final in tennis history, Troicki lost to his good friend Janko Tipsarević, 4–6, 2–6.

=== 2012: Second World Team Cup title ===
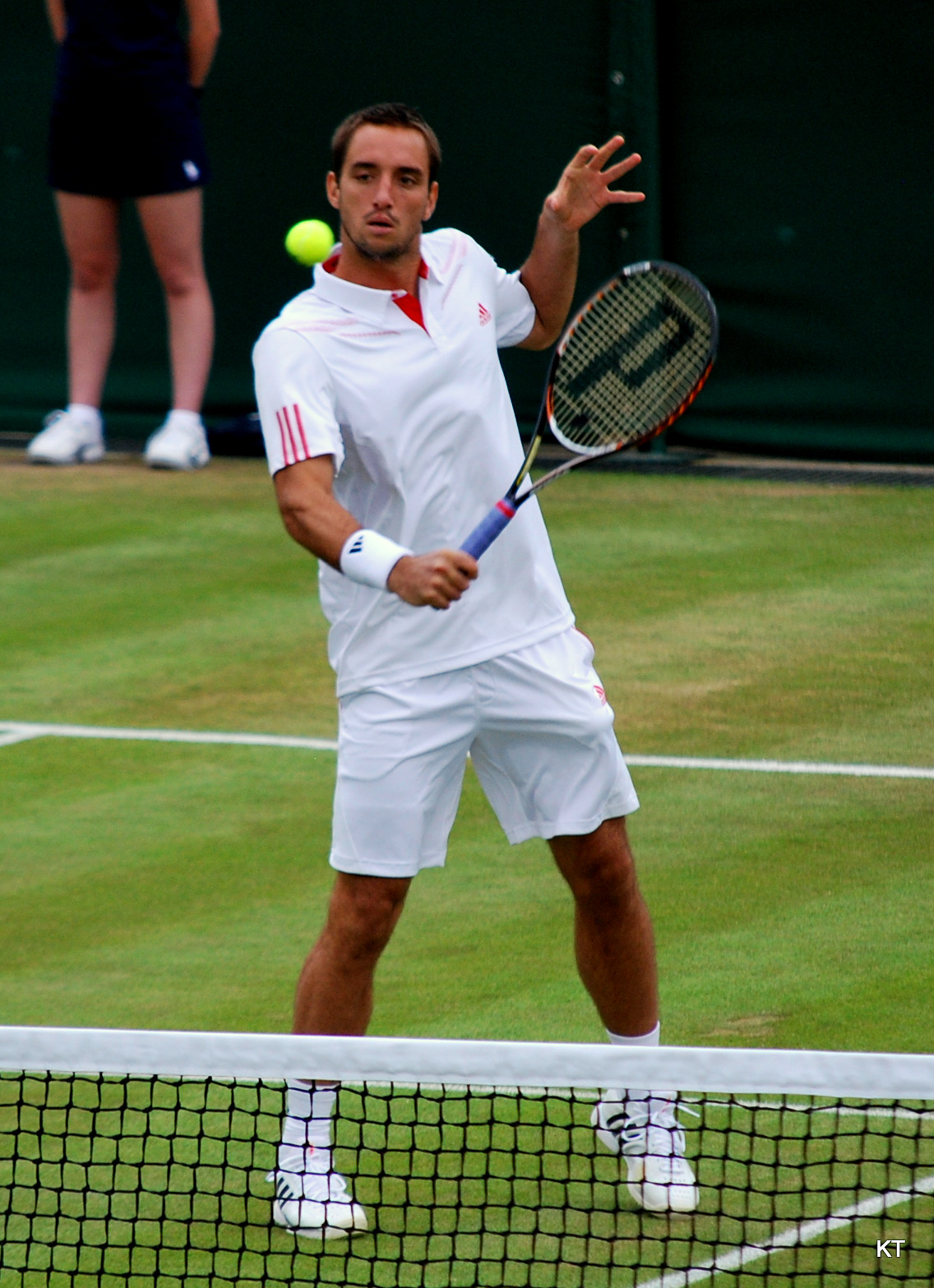
Troicki at 2012 Wimbledon

In 2012 with only two quarterfinal appearances, this season compared to previous seasons' individual results were subpar, however his contributions to the Serbian national team did result in winning the World Team Cup along with a third consecutive quarterfinal appearance at the Davis Cup.

=== 2013: Davis Cup runner-up & doping ban ===
Troicki won the Boodles Challenge, a warm-up to Wimbledon exhibition, defeating Robin Haase 7–5, 6–4 in the final. On 25 July 2013, Troicki was banned from playing tennis for 18 months, for failing to provide a blood sample at the Monte-Carlo Masters event. However, the suspension was reduced on appeal to one year, meaning he could play from 15 July 2014. After the Court of Arbitration for Sport announced their decision, Troicki, who had hoped his suspension would be overturned, said that he has "no idea about what to do now or where to go. I hope somehow I will be able to fight back."

=== 2014: Late return to form ===
After serving his doping suspension, Troicki made his return to professional tennis at the Swiss Open, an ATP 250 event in Gstaad, receiving a wildcard into the main draw. He defeated 8th seed Dominic Thiem and Andrey Golubev en route to the quarterfinals, where he lost to fourth seed Fernando Verdasco. He spent the next couple of months on the Challenger Tour, a period in which he won titles in Como, Italy and Banja Luka, Bosnia & Herzegovina. He returned to the ATP World Tour at the Shenzhen Open in China, coming through three rounds of qualifying and defeating world No. 5, David Ferrer, on his way to the quarterfinals, where he ultimately lost to Santiago Giraldo. He received a wildcard into the China Open in Beijing, and defeated Mikhail Youzhny in his opening match before losing to world No. 6, Tomáš Berdych. Troicki lost in the second round of qualifying at the Shanghai Masters, however qualified for the main draw in Erste Bank Open, and ultimately made it to the semifinals before losing to eventual champion Andy Murray in straight sets. His form after returning to the ATP Tour meant his ranking rose from 847th in the world to a year-end ranking just outside the top 100, finishing 102.

=== 2015: Second career title & return to top 20 ===
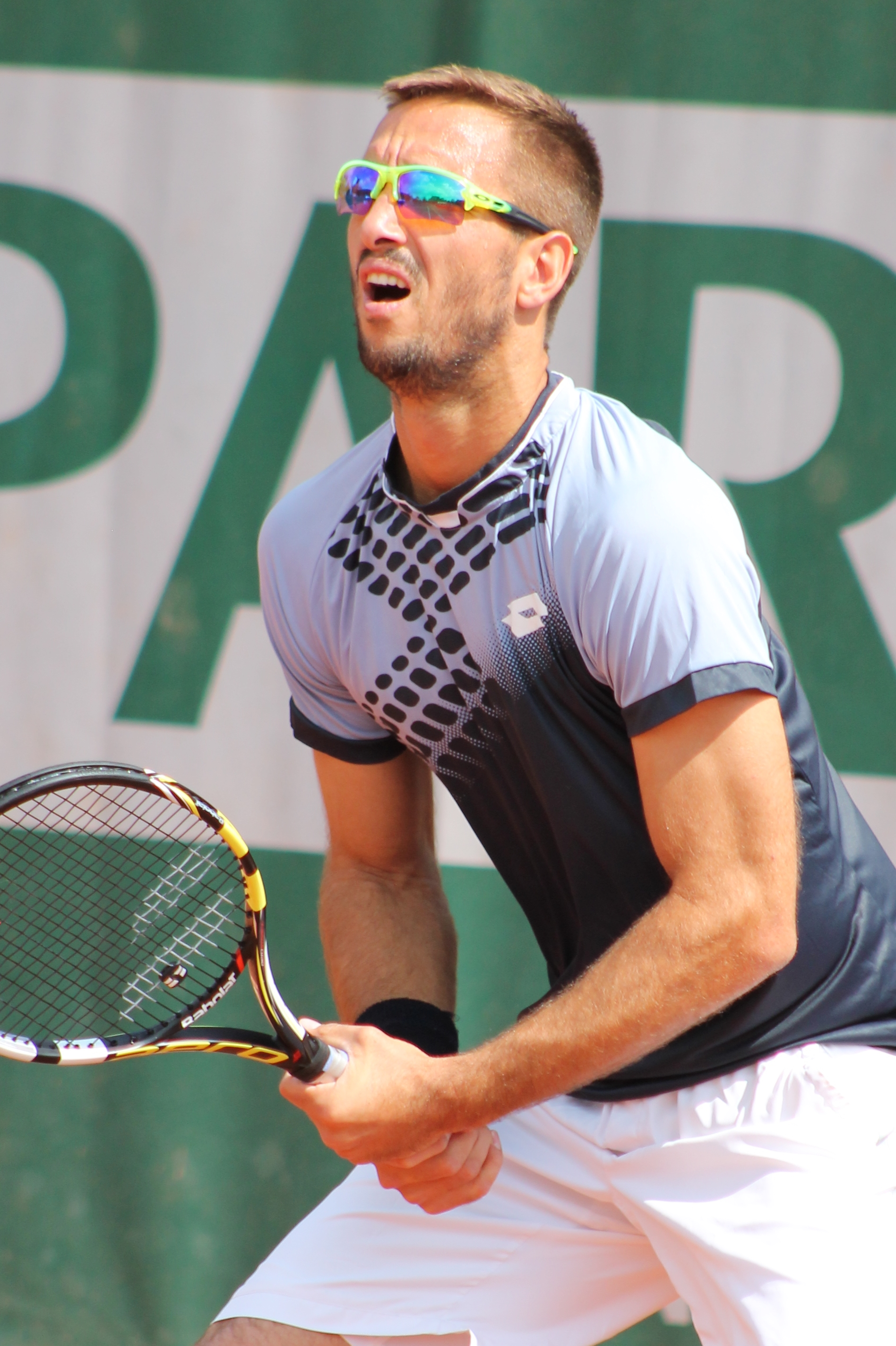
Troicki at the 2015 French Open

At the Apia International in Sydney in January 2015, Troicki defeated Gilles Müller 6–2, 6–4 in the semifinals en route to defeating Mikhail Kukushkin 6–2, 6–3 in the finals to capture his second career title. In the first ATP final in history featuring two qualifiers, Troicki dispatched Kukushkin in 64 minutes after breaking the Kazakh twice in each set. This victory brought him 38 positions up on ATP ladder to the position of 54 prior to the Australian Open. At the Australian Open, he reached the third round before being eliminated by world No. 7, Tomáš Berdych in straight sets. In March, Troicki defeated young Croatian prodigy Borna Ćorić in five epic sets in round one of the Davis Cup; Serbia would go on to win and progress to the quarterfinals. In June, defeating Marin Čilić on 14 June, Troicki played in the finals of Stuttgart Mercedes Cup versus Rafael Nadal. Troicki played very well but Nadal won in straight sets, 7–6, 6–3. Seeded No. 22, his US Open campaign opened with a straight-sets victory over wildcard Frances Tiafoe and a 3–1 win over Rajeev Ram before losing in the third round to Donald Young having won the first two sets.

=== 2016: Third career title & 250th victory ===
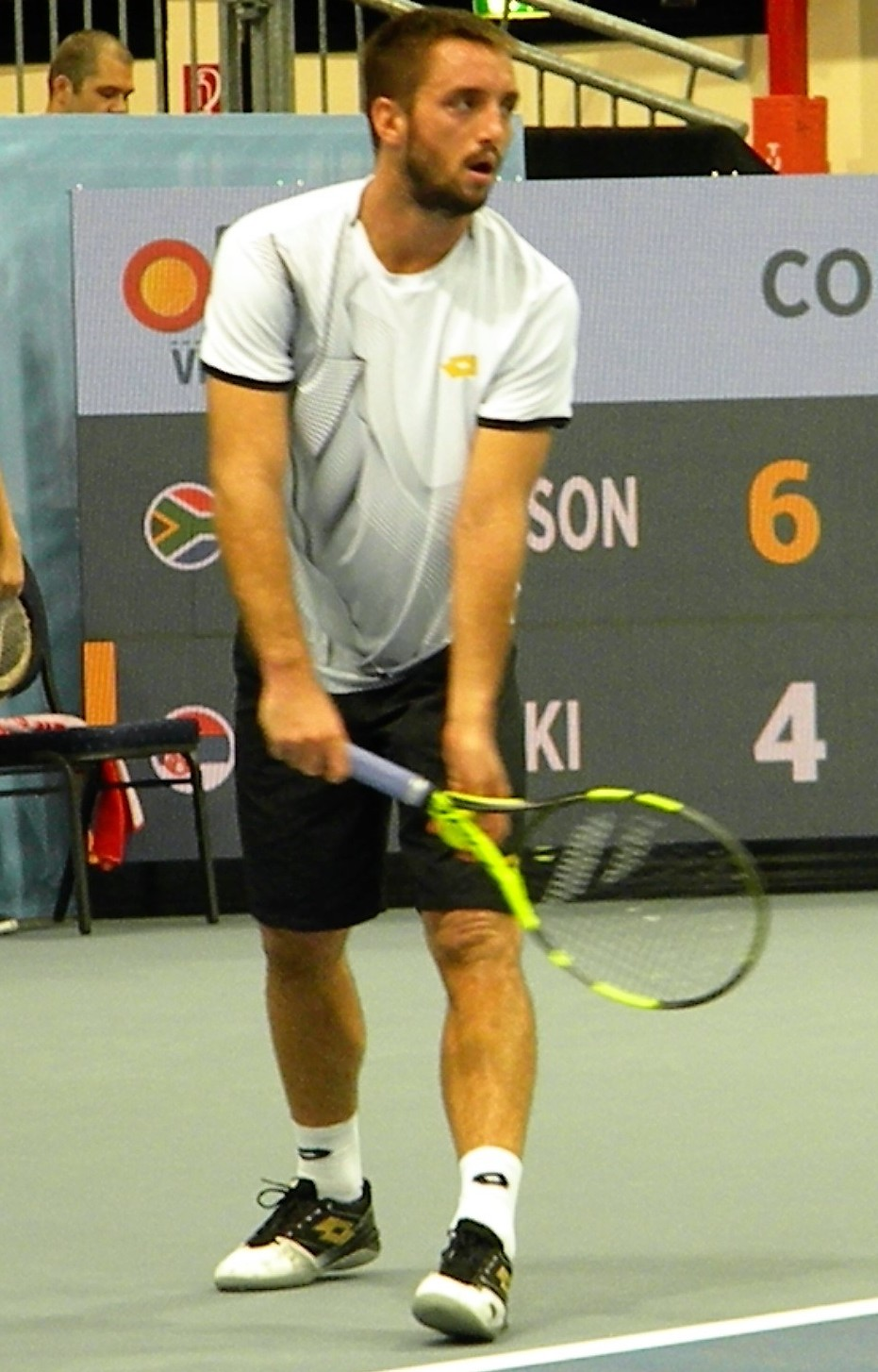
Photo of Viktor Troicki serving at 2016 Erste Bank Open

In January, Troicki collected this third career title at the Apia International Sydney, defeating Grigor Dimitrov 2–6, 6–1, 7–6 and saving a championship point en route to his title defense. It was his second encounter in as many weeks with Dimitrov, who had gotten the better of him in three sets in their prior meeting at the Brisbane International. At the Australian Open, he equaled his 2015 result by reaching the third round. In February, he reached the final of the Sofia Open where he was defeated by Roberto Bautista Agut. At the French Open, he made it to fourth round where he lost to the defending champion Stan Wawrinka 7–6, 6–7, 6–3, 6–2 after three hours of play. Troicki lost in the second round of the Wimbledon Championships to Albert Ramos Viñolas. He was fined for the protracted verbal abuse of umpire Damiano Torella following Torella's overrule of a line call that resulted in a match point for Ramos Viñolas. Troicki lost the subsequent point and the match. At the Shanghai Masters in October, he recorded his first win over Rafael Nadal after six meetings.

=== 2017: Second Masters quarterfinal & fourth Davis Cup semifinal ===
He reached the third round at the Australian Open, losing to US Open champion Stan Wawrinka in four sets, narrowly missing a tiebreaker in the fourth to push for a fifth set. In February, partnering Nenad Zimonjić he won his second ATP doubles title at Sofia Open. After that two solid wins at the first round of the Davis Cup ensured Serbia would reached the quarterfinals for the seventh time in eight years. At the Davis Cup quarterfinals in April, a straight sets victory over world No. 19 Pablo Carreño Busta saw him record a personal best serve of 233 km/h. A doubles victory with Nenad Zimonjić ensured a fourth Davis Cup semifinal for him & his country.

=== 2018: Injuries and struggles with form ===
In doubles, partnering Jan-Lennard Struff he reached the finals of Sydney International where they lost to Łukasz Kubot and Marcelo Melo. In singles, Troicki went 6–13 at the ATP Tour level in 2018. He suffered from a lower back injury during 2018 which limited his playing time. As a result, he fell out of the top 200.

=== 2019: Some success during the grass season ===
He reached the second round of Australian Open where he lost in 4 sets to the 14th seeded Stefanos Tsitsipas. During the year most of his success came only during the grass season. Troicki reached the finals of Surbiton Trophy where he lost to Daniel Evans, quarterfinals of Antalya Open where he lost to an eventual finalist Miomir Kecmanović and round of 16 at Hall of Fame Open in Newport where he lost again to an eventual finalist, this time Alexander Bublik.

=== 2020: Winning the inaugural ATP Cup and COVID-19 ===
By winning the inaugural ATP Cup in 2020 with Serbia, Troicki became the first player in history to win all three major international team competitions (Davis Cup in 2010 and World Team Cup in 2009 and 2012). During summer, Troicki tested positive for COVID-19, which affected his preparations for the restart of the tennis season due to pandemic. At the end of the year, he was appointed captain of the Serbia Davis Cup team.

=== 2021: Retirement ===
At the beginning of 2021, he qualified for the Australian Open main singles draw where he lost in the first round to Michael Mmoh in 5 tight sets. After failing to qualify for the main draw of Roland Garros he made a surprising run at Queen's Club by beating No. 7 seed Lorenzo Sonego in straight sets before losing in the round of 16 to Frances Tiafoe.

He announced that 2021 Wimbledon would be his last professional tournament before he retires. In the first round of qualifying he beat Christopher Eubanks before being defeated in the second round by Brandon Nakashima after three tight sets.

== Career overview ==
Troicki was a solid all-court player, who won more matches than he has lost on each surface. However, one factor that has kept him from more success is his poor record against top-10 players (65 losses vs 10 wins in his career).

== Coaching career ==
After finishing his professional tennis career, Viktor began his coaching career. Apart from being Serbia Davis Cup team captain, he started working in 2023 with Hamad Medjedovic. At the end of the 2024 season, he became coach of fellow Serbian Miomir Kecmanovic.

Additionally, he joined the coaching team of Novak Djokovic in 2025.

== Performance timelines ==
Key
W	F	SF	QF	#R	RR	Q#	P#	DNQ	A	Z#	PO	G	S	B	NMS	NTI	P	NH

(W) winner; (F) finalist; (SF) semifinalist; (QF) quarterfinalist; (#R) rounds 4, 3, 2, 1; (RR) round-robin stage; (Q#) qualification round; (P#) preliminary round; (DNQ) did not qualify; (A) absent; (Z#) Davis/Fed Cup Zonal Group (with number indication) or (PO) play-off; (G) gold, (S) silver or (B) bronze Olympic/Paralympic medal; (NMS) not a Masters tournament; (NTI) not a Tier I tournament; (P) postponed; (NH) not held; (SR) strike rate (events won / competed); (W–L) win–loss record.
To avoid confusion and double counting, these charts are updated at the conclusion of a tournament or when the player's participation has ended.

=== Singles ===
Tournament	2006	2007	2008	2009	2010	2011	2012	2013	2014	2015	2016	2017	2018	2019	2020	2021	SR	W–L	Win%
Grand Slam tournaments
Australian Open	A	Q3	1R	2R	2R	3R	2R	1R	A	3R	3R	3R	2R	2R	Q2	1R	0 / 12	13–12	52%
French Open	Q2	Q2	1R	2R	3R	4R	2R	4R	A	2R	4R	2R	A	Q3	Q1	Q2	0 / 9	15–9	63%
Wimbledon	Q1	A	2R	3R	2R	2R	4R	3R	A	4R	2R	1R	A	A	NH	Q2	0 / 9	14–9	61%
US Open	Q2	Q1	3R	2R	1R	1R	1R	A	A	3R	2R	3R	1R	A	A	A	0 / 9	8–9	47%
Win–loss	0–0	0–0	3–4	5–4	4–4	6–4	5–4	5–3	0–0	8–4	7–4	5–4	1–2	1–1	0–0	0–1	0 / 39	50–39	56%
National representation
Summer Olympics	NH		A	NH			1R	NH			1R	NH				A	0 / 2	0–2	0%
Davis Cup	A	A	1R	1R	W	SF	QF	F	A	QF	QF	SF	A	QF	NH	A	1 / 10	17–11	61%
ATP Masters 1000
Indian Wells Masters	A	1R	A	3R	4R	4R	2R	1R	A	1R	2R	1R	1R	A	NH	A	0 / 10	5–10	33%
Miami Open	A	Q1	2R	4R	2R	4R	3R	2R	A	3R	3R	2R	1R	A	NH	A	0 / 10	11–10	52%
Monte-Carlo Masters	A	A	A	1R	2R	QF	2R	1R	A	2R	1R	1R	Q1	A	NH	A	0 / 8	6–8	43%
Madrid Open (Note: Held as Hamburg Masters (outdoor clay) until 2008, Madrid Masters (outdoor clay) 2009 – present.)	A	A	A	1R	1R	1R	2R	2R	A	1R	1R	A	Q2	A	NH	A	0 / 7	2–7	22%
Italian Open	A	A	A	2R	2R	2R	2R	2R	A	3R	2R	2R	Q2	A	A	A	0 / 8	9–8	53%
Canadian Open	Q1	A	A	1R	2R	3R	2R	A	A	1R	1R	1R	A	Q1	NH	A	0 / 7	4–7	36%
Cincinnati Masters	Q2	A	A	1R	2R	1R	3R	A	A	1R	1R	1R	A	A	A	A	0 / 7	3–7	30%
Shanghai Masters (Note: Held as Madrid Masters (indoor hard) from 2002 to 2008, and Shanghai Masters (outdoor hard) 2009 – present.)	A	A	A	2R	A	1R	2R	A	Q2	2R	3R	QF	A	Q1	NH		0 / 6	8–6	57%
Paris Masters	A	A	1R	2R	A	3R	1R	A	A	3R	2R	1R	A	A	A	A	0 / 7	5–7	42%
Win–loss	0–0	0–1	1–2	8–9	5–7	11–9	8–9	3–5	0–0	7–9	5–9	5–8	0–2	0–0	0–0	0–0	0 / 70	53–70	43%
Career statistics
	2006	2007	2008	2009	2010	2011	2012	2013	2014	2015	2016	2017	2018	2019	2020	2021	Career		
Tournaments	1	7	19	27	26	24	27	18	4	28	29	28	13	4	3	4	262		
Titles	0	0	0	0	1	0	0	0	0	1	1	0	0	0	0	0	Career total: 3		
Finals	0	0	1	1	1	2	0	0	0	2	2	0	0	0	0	0	Career total: 9		
Overall win–loss	1–1	5–7	21–20	32–29	37–30	40–26	26–29	19–19	8–4	35–28	34–29	24–28	6–13	4–4	1–2	1–4	3 / 262	294–273	52%
Win %	50%	42%	51%	52%	55%	61%	47%	50%	67%	56%	54%	46%	32%	50%	33%	20%	Career total: 51.85%		
Year-end ranking	207	122	57	29	28	22	38	74	102	22	29	55	215	158	201	225	$9,265,938		

=== Doubles ===
Tournament	2007	2008	2009	2010	2011	2012	2013	2014	2015	2016	2017	2018	2019	2020	2021	SR	W–L	Win%
Grand Slam tournaments
Australian Open	A	A	1R	1R	A	A	1R	A	1R	1R	2R	1R	A	A	A	0 / 7	1–7	13%
French Open	A	QF	A	2R	2R	A	2R	A	1R	1R	1R	A	A	A	A	0 / 7	6–7	46%
Wimbledon	A	2R	3R	1R	A	A	1R	A	1R	2R	A	A	A	NH	A	0 / 6	4–6	40%
US Open	A	1R	A	1R	A	2R	A	A	1R	2R	1R	1R	A	A	A	0 / 7	2–7	22%
Win–loss	0–0	4–3	2–2	1–4	1–1	1–1	1–3	0–0	0–4	2–4	1–3	0–2	0–0	0–0	0–0	0 / 27	13–27	33%
National representation
Summer Olympics	NH	A	NH			1R	NH			A	NH				A	0 / 1	0–1	0%
Davis Cup	A	1R	1R	W	SF	QF	F	A	QF	QF	SF	A	QF	A	A	1 / 10	7–5	58%
ATP Masters 1000
Indian Wells Masters	A	A	A	2R	QF	1R	1R	A	1R	2R	QF	A	A	NH	A	0 / 7	6–6	50%
Miami Open	A	A	A	A	A	1R	1R	A	1R	2R	1R	1R	A	NH	A	0 / 6	1–5	17%
Monte-Carlo Masters	A	A	SF	2R	2R	QF	A	A	1R	1R	2R	A	A	NH	A	0 / 7	8–7	53%
Madrid Open	A	A	A	SF	2R	1R	A	A	QF	1R	A	A	A	NH	A	0 / 5	6–5	55%
Italian Open	A	A	A	2R	A	1R	2R	A	A	QF	A	A	A	A	A	0 / 4	4–4	50%
Canadian Open	A	A	A	A	A	2R	A	A	1R	2R	A	A	A	NH	A	0 / 3	2–2	50%
Cincinnati Masters	A	A	A	A	1R	QF	A	A	1R	2R	A	A	A	A	A	0 / 4	2–4	33%
Shanghai Masters	A	A	A	A	2R	A	A	A	1R	A	A	A	A	NH		0 / 2	1–2	33%
Paris Masters	A	1R	A	A	A	A	A	A	1R	A	A	A	A	A	A	0 / 2	0–2	0%
Win–loss	0–0	0–1	3–1	6–3	5–5	5–6	1–3	0–0	2–8	5–6	3–3	0–1	0–0	0–0	0–0	0 / 40	30–37	45%
Career statistics
	2007	2008	2009	2010	2011	2012	2013	2014	2015	2016	2017	2018	2019	2020	2021	Career		
Tournaments	4	9	12	16	12	16	13	0	22	23	15	9	0	1	0	Career total: 152		
Titles	0	0	0	1	0	0	0	0	0	0	1	0	0	0	0	Career total: 2		
Finals	0	0	0	2	0	0	0	0	0	0	1	1	0	0	0	Career total: 4		
Overall win–loss	2–4	6–9	15–12	19–16	12–13	8–16	8–12	0–0	7–22	11–22	13–14	4–8	1–3	5–2	0–0	2 / 152	111–153	42%
Win %	33%	40%	56%	54%	48%	33%	40%	–	24%	33%	48%	33%	25%	71%	–	Career total: 42.05%		
Year-end ranking	259	146	70	55	75	118	161	1248	170	89	111	301	723	221	245			

== ATP career finals ==
=== Singles: 9 (3 titles, 6 runner-ups) ===
Legend Grand Slam (–) ATP World Tour Finals (–) ATP World Tour Masters 1000 (–) ATP World Tour 500 Series (–) ATP World Tour 250 Series (3–6)	Finals by surface Hard (3–5) Clay (–) Grass (0–1) Carpet (–)	Finals by settings Outdoors (2–3) Indoors (1–3)

Result	W–L	Date	Tournament	Tier	Surface	Opponent	Score
Loss	0–1	Aug 2008	Washington Open, US	International	Hard	(Argentina) Juan Martín del Potro	3–6, 3–6
Loss	0–2	Oct 2009	Thailand Open, Thailand	250 Series	Hard (i)	(France) Gilles Simon	5–7, 3–6
Win	1–2	Oct 2010	Kremlin Cup, Russia	250 Series	Hard (i)	(Cyprus) Marcos Baghdatis	3–6, 6–4, 6–3
Loss	1–3	Jan 2011	Sydney International, Australia	250 Series	Hard	(France) Gilles Simon	5–7, 6–7^{(4–7)}
Loss	1–4	Oct 2011	Kremlin Cup, Russia	250 Series	Hard (i)	(Serbia) Janko Tipsarević	4–6, 2–6
Win	2–4	Jan 2015	Sydney International, Australia	250 Series	Hard	(Kazakhstan) Mikhail Kukushkin	6–2, 6–3
Loss	2–5	Jun 2015	Stuttgart Open, Germany	250 Series	Grass	(Spain) Rafael Nadal	6–7^{(3–7)}, 3–6
Win	3–5	Jan 2016	Sydney International, Australia (2)	250 Series	Hard	(Bulgaria) Grigor Dimitrov	2–6, 6–1, 7–6^{(9–7)}
Loss	3–6	Feb 2016	Sofia Open, Bulgaria	250 Series	Hard (i)	(Spain) Roberto Bautista Agut	3–6, 4–6

=== Doubles: 4 (2 titles, 2 runner-ups) ===
Legend Grand Slam (–) ATP World Tour Finals (–) ATP World Tour Masters 1000 (–) ATP World Tour 500 Series (–) ATP World Tour 250 Series (2–2)	Finals by surface Hard (2–2) Clay (–) Grass (–) Carpet (–)	Finals by settings Outdoors (0–1) Indoors (2–1)

Result	W–L	Date	Tournament	Tier	Surface	Partner	Opponents	Score
Win	1–0	Oct 2010	Thailand Open, Thailand	250 Series	Hard (i)	(Germany) Christopher Kas	(Israel) Jonathan Erlich (Austria) Jürgen Melzer	6–4, 6–4
Loss	1–1	Oct 2010	Kremlin Cup, Russia	250 Series	Hard (i)	(Serbia) Janko Tipsarević	(Russia) Igor Kunitsyn (Russia) Dmitry Tursunov	6–7^{(8–10)}, 3–6
Win	2–1	Feb 2017	Sofia Open, Bulgaria	250 Series	Hard (i)	(Serbia) Nenad Zimonjić	(Russia) Mikhail Elgin (Russia) Andrey Kuznetsov	6–4, 6–4
Loss	2–2	Jan 2018	Sydney International, Australia	250 Series	Hard	(Germany) Jan-Lennard Struff	(Poland) Łukasz Kubot (Brazil) Marcelo Melo	3–6, 4–6

== Team competition finals: 4 (4–0) ==
Result	Date	Event	Surface	Partner/Team	Opponents	Score
Win	May 2009	World Team Cup, Germany	Clay	(Serbia) Janko Tipsarević (Serbia) Nenad Zimonjić	(Germany) Rainer Schüttler (Germany) Philipp Kohlschreiber (Germany) Nicolas Kiefer (Germany) Mischa Zverev	2–1
Win	Dec 2010	Davis Cup, Serbia	Hard (i)	(Serbia) Novak Djokovic (Serbia) Janko Tipsarević (Serbia) Nenad Zimonjić	(France) Gaël Monfils (France) Michaël Llodra (France) Arnaud Clément (France) Gilles Simon	3–2
Win	May 2012	World Team Cup, Germany (2)	Clay	(Serbia) Janko Tipsarević (Serbia) Nenad Zimonjić (Serbia) Miki Janković	(Czech Republic) Tomáš Berdych (Czech Republic) Radek Štěpánek (Czech Republic) František Čermák	3–0
Win	Jan 2020	ATP Cup, Australia	Hard	(Serbia) Novak Djokovic (Serbia) Dušan Lajović (Serbia) Nikola Milojević (Serbia) Nikola Ćaćić	(Spain) Rafael Nadal (Spain) Roberto Bautista Agut (Spain) Pablo Carreño Busta (Spain) Albert Ramos Viñolas (Spain) Feliciano López	2–1

== Challenger and Futures finals ==
=== Singles: 12 (7–5) ===
Legend (singles) ATP Challenger Tour (4–4) ITF Futures Tour (3–1)	Finals by surface Hard (2–1) Clay (4–3) Grass (0–1) Carpet (1–0)	Finals by settings Outdoors (6–5) Indoors (1–0)

Result	W–L	Date	Tournament	Tier	Surface	Opponent	Score
Win	1–0	Aug 2004	Serbia & Montenegro F6, Niš	Futures	Clay	(Spain) Alberto Soriano-Maldonado	6–2, 6–1
Win	2–0	Jun 2005	Serbia & Montenegro F3, Belgrade	Futures	Clay	(Italy) Fabio Colangelo	6–2, 6–1
Loss	2–1	Aug 2005	Serbia & Montenegro F4, Novi Sad	Futures	Clay	(North Macedonia) Lazar Magdinčev	4–6, 3–6
Loss	2–2	Sep 2005	Banja Luka, Bosnia & Herzegovina	Challenger	Clay	(Greece) Vasilis Mazarakis	2–6, 2–6
Win	3–2	Apr 2006	United Arab Emirates F2, Dubai	Futures	Hard	(Germany) Philipp Petzschner	6–4, 6–0
Win	4–2	Apr 2006	Dharwad, India	Challenger	Hard	(Poland) Łukasz Kubot	2–6, 6–4, 6–4
Loss	4–3	Nov 2007	Busan, South Korea	Challenger	Hard	(Czech Republic) Ivo Minář	6–7^{(2–7)}, 7–6^{(9–7)}, 3–6
Loss	4–4	Apr 2008	Bermuda, Bermuda	Challenger	Clay	(Japan) Kei Nishikori	6–2, 5–7, 6–7^{(5–7)}
Win	5–4	Feb 2009	Belgrade, Serbia	Challenger	Carpet (i)	(Slovakia) Dominik Hrbatý	6–4, 6–2
Win	6–4	Aug 2014	Como, Italy	Challenger	Clay	(Republic of Ireland) Louk Sorensen	6–3, 6–2
Win	7–4	Sep 2014	Banja Luka, Bosnia & Herzegovina	Challenger	Clay	(Spain) Albert Ramos Viñolas	7–5, 4–6, 7–5
Loss	7–5	Jun 2019	Surbiton, United Kingdom	Challenger	Grass	(United Kingdom) Dan Evans	2–6, 3–6

=== Doubles: 8 (3–5) ===
Legend (doubles) ATP Challenger Tour (1–1) ITF Futures Tour (2–4)	Finals by surface Hard (2–3) Clay (1–2) Grass (0–0) Carpet (0–0)	Finals by settings Outdoors (2–5) Indoors (1–0)

Result	W–L	Date	Tournament	Tier	Surface	Partner	Opponents	Score
Loss	0–1	Nov 2004	Tunisia F4, Sfax	Futures	Hard	(Serbia and Montenegro) Ilija Bozoljac	(Poland) Maciej Diłaj (Austria) Stefan Wiespeiner	6–1, 3–6, 1–6
Loss	0–2	May 2005	Hungary F3, Hódmezővásárhely	Futures	Clay	(Serbia and Montenegro) Boris Pašanski	(Hungary) Norbert Pákai (Hungary) Tibor Szathmáry	3–6, 3–6
Loss	0–3	Aug 2005	Serbia & Montenegro F4, Novi Sad	Futures	Clay	(Serbia and Montenegro) Aleksander Slović	(Slovakia) Peter Miklušičák (Czech Republic) Lukáš Rosol	4–6, 4–6
Win	1–3	Sep 2005	Hungary F6, Budapest	Futures	Clay	(Serbia and Montenegro) Aleksander Slović	(Hungary) Kornél Bardóczky (Hungary) Gergely Kisgyörgy	4–6, 7–6^{(7–0)}, 6–3
Win	2–3	Mar 2006	Sarajevo, Bosnia and Herzegovina	Challenger	Hard (i)	(Serbia and Montenegro) Ilija Bozoljac	(Austria) Alexander Peya (Germany) Lars Uebel	6–3, 6–4
Loss	2–4	Apr 2006	United Arab Emirates F1, Abu Dhabi	Futures	Hard	(Germany) Mischa Zverev	(Switzerland) Marco Chiudinelli (Germany) Philipp Petzschner	5–7, 2–6
Win	3–4	Apr 2006	United Arab Emirates F2, Dubai	Futures	Hard	(Germany) Mischa Zverev	(Russia) Vadim Davletshin (Russia) Alexander Krasnorutskiy	6–3, 6–2
Loss	3–5	Jul 2006	Recanati, Italy	Challenger	Hard	(Germany) Sebastian Rieschick	(Italy) Simone Bolelli (Italy) Davide Sanguinetti	1–6, 6–3, [4–10]

== Junior Grand Slam finals ==
=== Doubles: 1 (1 runner-up) ===
Result	Year	Tournament	Surface	Partner	Opponents	Score
Loss	2004	Wimbledon	Grass	(Netherlands) Robin Haase	(United States) Brendan Evans (United States) Scott Oudsema	4–6, 4–6

== Exhibitions ==
=== Tournament finals ===
==== Singles ====
Result	Date	Tournament	Surface	Opponent	Score
Win	Jun 2013	Boodles Challenge, United Kingdom	Grass	(Netherlands) Robin Haase	7–5, 6–4

== Record against top-10 players ==
Troicki's record against players who have been ranked in the top 10. Active players are in boldface:

Player	MP	Record	Win%	Last match
**Number 1 ranked players**	38	6–32	16%	
(Australia) Lleyton Hewitt	2	2–0	100%	Won (6–2, 6–0) at 2012 Cincinnati 2R
(Spain) Juan Carlos Ferrero	1	1–0	100%	Won (4–6, 6–7^{(3–7)}, 6–2, 7–6^{(7–3)}, 6–2) at 2012 Australian Open 1R
(United States) Andy Roddick	3	1–2	33%	Lost (3–6, 4–6) at 2008 Tokyo QF
**(Spain) Rafael Nadal**	6	1–5	17%	Won (6–3, 7–6^{(7–3)}) at 2016 Shanghai 2R
**(Serbia) Novak Djokovic**	14	1–13	7%	Lost (1–6, 4–6) at 2013 Dubai 1R
(Spain) Carlos Moyá	1	0–1	0%	Lost (6–3, 6–7^{(2–7)}, 5–7) at 2008 Umag 2R
(Russia) **Daniil Medvedev**	1	0–1	0%	Lost (6–3, 3–6, 1–6) at 2016 Kremlin Cup
**(Switzerland) Roger Federer**	2	0–2	0%	Lost (2–6, 2–6) at 2011 Doha QF
**(United Kingdom) Andy Murray**	8	0–8	0%	Lost (3–6, 2–6) at 2016 Olympics 1R
Number 3 ranked players	64	17–47	27%	
**(Austria) Dominic Thiem**	3	3–0	100%	Won (6–3, 3–6, 7–6^{7–5}) at 2017 Shanghai 2R
(Croatia) Ivan Ljubičić	4	2–2	50%	Won (6–4, 5–7, 6–4) at 2009 Zagreb 2R
**(Croatia) Marin Čilić**	11	5–6	43%	Lost (3–6, 4–6) at 2016 Cincinnati 1R
**(Bulgaria) Grigor Dimitrov**	5	2–3	40%	Lost (3–6, 3–6) at 2017 Sofia QF
(Russia) Nikolay Davydenko	3	1–2	33%	Won (6–4, 7–5) at 2011 Rome 1R
**(Germany) Alexander Zverev**	4	1–3	25%	Lost (3–6, 6–4, 4–6) at 2017 Vienna 1R
(Spain) David Ferrer	5	1–4	20%	Lost (3–6, 6–3, 5–7) at 2016 Vienna QF
(Argentina) David Nalbandian	5	1–4	20%	Lost (4–6, 6–4, 2–6, 3–6) at 2011 Davis Cup SF
**(Canada) Milos Raonic**	7	1–6	14%	Lost (3–6, 4–6) at 2017 Tokyo 1R
**(Greece) Stefanos Tsitsipas**	1	0–1	0%	Lost (3–6, 6–2, 2–6, 5–7) at 2019 Australian Open 2R
**(Argentina) Juan Martín del Potro**	7	0–7	0%	Lost (6–4, 1–6, 4–6) at 2017 Shanghai QF
**(Switzerland) Stan Wawrinka**	9	0–9	0%	Lost (1–6, 6–7^{(3–7)}) at 2018 Sofia QF
Number 4 ranked players	17	3–14	18%	
(United States) James Blake	1	1–0	100%	Won (6–4, 6–2, 6–2) at 2013 Roland Garros 1R
**(Japan) Kei Nishikori**	6	1–5	17%	Lost (2–6, 5–7) at 2016 Paris 3R
(Czech Republic) Tomáš Berdych	8	1–7	12%	Lost (1–6, 2–6) at 2018 Rotterdam 2R
(Germany) Nicolas Kiefer	1	0–1	0%	Lost (2–6, 1–6) at 2009 Halle 1R
(Sweden) Robin Söderling	1	0–1	0%	Lost (5–7, 4–6) at 2011 Rotterdam SF
Number 5 ranked players	23	12–11	52%	
**(South Africa) Kevin Anderson**	5	3–2	60%	Won (4–6, 7–6^{7–5}, 7–5) at 2016 Vienna Open 1R
(Germany) Rainer Schüttler	5	3–2	60%	Lost (3–6, 6–4, 3–6) at 2010 St. Petersburg 1R
(Spain) Tommy Robredo	6	3–3	50%	Won (6–1, 6–4) at 2016 Sydney 2R
**(France) Jo-Wilfried Tsonga**	7	3–4	43%	Lost (3–6, 3–6, 3–6) at 2013 Roland Garros 4R
Number 6 ranked players	15	3–12	20%	
(Ecuador) Nicolás Lapentti	2	2–0	100%	Won (4–6, 6–4, 6–1, 6–3) at 2010 Australian Open 1R
**(France) Gilles Simon**	7	1–6	14%	Won (6–4, 6–2, 6–2) at 2016 Roland Garros 3R
**(France) Gaël Monfils**	5	0–5	0%	Lost (3–6, 4–6) at 2019 Sofia 1R
**(Italy) Matteo Berrettini**	1	0–1	0%	Lost (6–4, 6–7^{(5–7)}, 4–6) at 2018 Qatar 1R
Number 7 ranked players	13	4–9	31%	
**(Norway) Casper Ruud**	1	1–0	100%	Won (6–3, 7–6^{(7–4)}) at 2016 Chengdu Open 1R
**(Spain) Fernando Verdasco**	2	1–1	50%	Won (6–4, 3–6, 6–4) at 2016 Winston-Salem QF
**(France) Richard Gasquet**	5	2–3	40%	Lost (4–6, 2–6) at 2017 Rotterdam 1R
**(Belgium) David Goffin**	4	1–3	25%	Lost (1–6, 1–6) at 2016 Miami 3R
(United States) Mardy Fish	2	0–2	0%	Lost (2–6, 2–6) at 2015 Cincinnati 1R
Number 8 ranked players	50	25–25	50%	
**(United States) Jack Sock**	1	1–0	100%	Won (6–2, 6–3) at 2015 Paris 1R
**(Russia) Karen Khachanov**	3	2–1	67%	Won (6–4, 6–7^{(3–7)}, 6–3, 1–6, 7–6^{(8–6)}) at 2017 Davis Cup RR
**(United States) John Isner**	8	5–3	63%	Won (6–4, 7–6^{(7–4)}) at 2017 Shanghai 3R
(Serbia) Janko Tipsarević	5	3–2	63%	Won (5–7, 7–6^{(7–5)}, 7–6^{(8–6)}) at 2017 London 1R
(Czech Republic) Radek Štěpánek	10	5–5	50%	Won (6–4, 6–4) at 2013 Munich 2R
(Russia) Mikhail Youzhny	8	4–4	50%	Lost (3–6, 5–7) at 2015 Canada 1R
(Cyprus) Marcos Baghdatis	8	3–5	38%	Lost (5–7, 2–6) at 2018 Dubai 1R
(Austria) Jürgen Melzer	4	1–3	25%	Won (7–6^{(9–7)}, 3–6, 7–6^{(7–3)}) at 2010 Tokyo 2R
(Argentina) Guillermo Cañas	1	0–1	0%	Lost (2–6, 2–6) at 2008 s-Hertogenbosch QF
**(Argentina) Diego Schwartzman**	1	0–1	0%	Lost (3–6, 4–6) at 2017 Paris Masters 1R
Number 9 ranked players	3	0–3	0%	
(Spain) Nicolás Almagro	3	0–3	0%	Lost (4–6, 6–7^{(3–7)}) at 2012 Olympics 1R
Number 10 ranked players	9	6–3	67%	
**(France) Lucas Pouille**	1	1–0	100%	Won (6–4, 7–5) at 2013 Montpellier Open 1R
**(Spain) Pablo Carreño Busta**	1	1–0	100%	Won (6–3, 6–4, 6–3) at 2017 Davis Cup QF
(Argentina) Juan Mónaco	4	3–1	75%	Won (7–5, 7–5, 6–3) at 2012 Wimbledon 3R
**(Latvia) Ernests Gulbis**	2	1–1	50%	Won (6–3, 6–7^{(2–7)}, 6–3) at 2018 Sofia Open 1R
(France) Arnaud Clément	1	0–1	0%	Lost (7–6^{(7–3)}, 4–6, 2–6) at 2007 Indian Wells 1R
**Total**	**228**	**74–154**	**32%**	

== Wins over top 10 players ==
- He has a 10–65 (13.3%) record against players who were, at the time the match was played, ranked in the top 10.

Season	2007	2008	2009	...	2014	2015	2016	2017	Total
Wins	1	1	1		1	3	2	1	10

#	Player	Rank	Event	Surface	Rd	Score
2007
1.	(Serbia) Novak Djokovic	No. 3	Croatia Open	Clay	2R	2–6, 6–4, 7–5
2008
2.	(United States) Andy Roddick	No. 9	Washington Open, United States	Hard	QF	0–6, 6–2, 6–4
2009
3.	(France) Jo-Wilfried Tsonga	No. 7	Thailand Open	Hard (i)	SF	1–6, 6–2, 6–3
2014
4.	(Spain) David Ferrer	No. 5	Shenzhen Open, China	Hard	2R	6–3, 6–4
2015
5.	(Croatia) Marin Čilić	No. 9	MercedesCup, Germany	Grass	SF	6–3, 6–7^{(1–7)}, 7–6^{(7–2)}
6.	(Croatia) Marin Čilić	No. 9	Queen's Club Championships, UK	Grass	2R	6–7^{(8–10)}, 6–2, 6–3
7.	(Canada) Milos Raonic	No. 9	China Open	Hard	1R	6–4, 6–4
2016
8.	(Spain) Rafael Nadal	No. 5	Shanghai Masters, China	Hard	2R	6–3, 7–6^{(7–3)}
9.	(Austria) Dominic Thiem	No. 9	Vienna Open, Austria	Hard	2R	6–2, 7–5
2017
10.	(Austria) Dominic Thiem	No. 7	Shanghai Masters, China	Hard	2R	6–3, 3–6, 7–6^{(7–5)}

== Records ==
• Record of consecutive five-set Grand Slam matches

Record	Time span	Matches	Players matched
7 consecutive matches	2011–2012	vs. (Colombia) Alejandro Falla 6–3, 3–6, 6–4, 5–7, 5–7 L 2011 US Open 1R vs. (Spain) Juan Carlos Ferrero 4–6, 6–7^{(3–7)}, 6–2, 7–6^{(7–3)}, 6–2 W 2012 Australian Open 1R vs. (Kazakhstan) Mikhail Kukushkin 7–5, 4–6, 2–6, 6–4, 3–6 L 2012 Australian Open 2R vs. (Brazil) Thomaz Bellucci 4–6, 6–3, 5–7, 6–3, 6–2 W 2012 Roland Garros 1R vs. (Italy) Fabio Fognini 2–6, 6–3, 6–4, 3–6, 6–8 L 2012 Roland Garros 2R vs. (Spain) Marcel Granollers 7–5, 7–6^{(7–5)}, 3–6, 2–6, 8–6 W 2012 Wimbledon 1R vs. (Slovakia) Martin Kližan 6–4, 4–6, 5–7, 7–6^{(7–3)}, 6–4 W 2012 Wimbledon 2R	(Germany) Philipp Petzschner

== Personal life ==
=== Ancestry ===
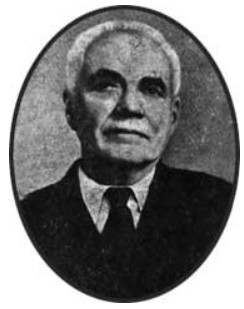
Viktor's great-grandfather: Sergey Viktorovich Troitskiy, an Orthodox canon theologian.

Troicki's paternal grandfather, Mikhail Sergeevich Troitskiy (Mihajlo Sergejevič Troicki)—then a young military cadet in the Russian Imperial Army who later became a structural engineer and bridge specialist—had emigrated in 1917 from Tver to the Kingdom of Serbia, along with other White émigrés, fleeing the Russian Revolution. He eventually settled in Novi Sad where he met and married another Russian White émigré, Irina, from Rostov-on-Don, Viktor's grandmother.

His paternal great-grandfather was Sergey Viktorovich Troitskiy (1878–1972), a Russian and Serbian Orthodox canon theologian and church historian, university professor, author of several works on Orthodox Canon law, Doctor of Canon law (1961) and Dean at the University of Law in Subotica, who counted Russian Patriarch Alexy I of Moscow and General Pyotr Wrangel among his lifelong friends, starting from their studying days. Born into a priest's family, he graduated from the St. Petersburg Archaeological Institute in 1900 and earned a PhD in theology from the St. Petersburg Theological Academy in 1901. He went on to teach at the Alexander Nevsky Theological School and obtained a master's degree in Canon Law in 1913. In 1920, he emigrated to the Kingdom of Serbs, Croats, and Slovenes to join his family, who had already settled there.

=== Marriage and relationships ===
In May 2008, 22-year-old Troicki began dating model Sunčica Travica, one year his senior, having met her in Paris while competing at Roland Garros. The relationship featured several breakups followed by reconciliation before ending for good during summer 2013 in the wake of his doping ban.

During early 2014, while suspended from playing tennis, Troicki commenced a relationship with model Sofija Milošević. The couple broke up less than a year later in January 2015.

Troicki began dating model Aleksandra Đorđević in April 2015. With Đorđević in early stage of pregnancy, the two married on 27 November 2016 in a Serbian Orthodox ceremony at the St. Alexander Nevsky Church in Belgrade. The church ceremony was followed by a reception at the Crowne Plaza Belgrade hotel. Their first child, daughter Irina, was born in June 2017. In August 2020, the couple had another daughter, Darija.

== See also ==
- Serbia Davis Cup team
- List of Serbia Davis Cup team representatives
- Lists of tennis players
