= ATP Sofia Open =

Sofia Open

Defunct tennis tournament
- Event name: Sofia Open
- Tour: ATP World Tour
- Founded: 2016
- Abolished: 2023
- Editions: 8 (2023)
- Location: Sofia; Bulgaria
- Venue: Arena Sofia
- Category: ATP World Tour 250 series
- Surface: Hard (indoor); Proflex (2016–2019); Acrylic on Wood (2020–current)
- Draw: 28S / 16Q / 16D
- Prize money: €562,815 (2023)
- Website: sofiaopen.bg

Current champions (2023)
- Singles: (France) Adrian Mannarino
- Doubles: (Ecuador) Gonzalo Escobar (Kazakhstan) Aleksandr Nedovyesov

The Sofia Open was an ATP World Tour 250 series tournament played on indoor hardcourts. It was held for the first time as part of the 2016 ATP World Tour. The tournament took place at the Arena Sofia in Sofia, Bulgaria. In 2023 the tournament was held for one additional year, replacing the Tel Aviv Open, which was cancelled due to the outbreak of war in the region.

== Finals ==
=== Singles ===
Year	Champions	Runners-up	Score
2016	(Spain) Roberto Bautista Agut	(Serbia) Viktor Troicki	6–3, 6–4
2017	(Bulgaria) Grigor Dimitrov	(Belgium) David Goffin	7–5, 6–4
2018	(Bosnia and Herzegovina) Mirza Bašić	(Romania) Marius Copil	7–6^{(8–6)}, 6–7^{(4–7)}, 6–4
2019	(Russia) Daniil Medvedev	(Hungary) Márton Fucsovics	6–4, 6–3
2020	(Italy) Jannik Sinner	(Canada) Vasek Pospisil	6–4, 3–6, 7–6^{(7–3)}
2021	(Italy) Jannik Sinner (2)	(France) Gaël Monfils	6–3, 6–4
2022	(Switzerland) Marc-Andrea Hüsler	(Denmark) Holger Rune	6–4, 7–6^{(10–8)}
2023	(France) Adrian Mannarino	(United Kingdom) Jack Draper	7–6^{(8–6)}, 2–6, 6–3

=== Doubles ===
Year	Champions	Runners-up	Score
2016	(Netherlands) Wesley Koolhof (Netherlands) Matwé Middelkoop	(Austria) Philipp Oswald (Canada) Adil Shamasdin	5–7, 7–6^{(11–9)}, [10–6]
2017	(Serbia) Viktor Troicki (Serbia) Nenad Zimonjić	(Russia) Mikhail Elgin (Russia) Andrey Kuznetsov	6–4, 6–4
2018	(Netherlands) Robin Haase (Netherlands) Matwé Middelkoop (2)	(Croatia) Nikola Mektić (Austria) Alexander Peya	5–7, 6–4, [10–4]
2019	(Croatia) Nikola Mektić (Austria) Jürgen Melzer	(Chinese Taipei) Hsieh Cheng-peng (Indonesia) Christopher Rungkat	6–2, 4–6 [10–2]
2020	(United Kingdom) Jamie Murray (United Kingdom) Neal Skupski	(Austria) Jürgen Melzer (France) Édouard Roger-Vasselin	Walkover
2021	(United Kingdom) Jonny O'Mara (United Kingdom) Ken Skupski	(Austria) Oliver Marach (Austria) Philipp Oswald (2)	6–3, 6–4
2022	(Brazil) Rafael Matos (Spain) David Vega Hernández	(Germany) Fabian Fallert (Germany) Oscar Otte	3–6, 7–5, [10–8]
2023	(Ecuador) Gonzalo Escobar (Kazakhstan) Aleksandr Nedovyesov	(United Kingdom) Julian Cash (Croatia) Nikola Mektić	6–3, 3–6, [13–11]
