= 2022 Internationaux de Tennis de Vendée – Doubles =

Doubles
- 2022 Internationaux de Tennis de Vendée

Final
- Champions: (Netherlands) Sander Arends (Netherlands) David Pel
- Runners-up: (India) Purav Raja (India) Divij Sharan
- Score: 6–7^{(1–7)}, 7–6^{(8–6)}, [10–6]

Events
Singles	Doubles
- Internationaux de Tennis de Vendée

Jonathan Eysseric and Quentin Halys were the defending champions but chose not to defend their title.

Sander Arends and David Pel won the title after defeating Purav Raja and Divij Sharan 6–7^{(1–7)}, 7–6^{(8–6)}, [10–6] in the final.

== Seeds ==
1. (Serbia) Ivan Sabanov / (Serbia) Matej Sabanov (first round)
2. (Netherlands) Sander Arends / (Netherlands) David Pel (champions)
3. (Netherlands) Sem Verbeek / (Poland) Szymon Walków (quarterfinals)
4. (Germany) Fabian Fallert / (Germany) Hendrik Jebens (quarterfinals)

== Draw ==
Key

- Q = Qualifier
- WC = Wild card
- LL = Lucky loser
- Alt = Alternate
- ITF = ITF entry
- PR = Protected ranking
- SR = Special ranking
- SE = Special exempt
- JE = Junior exempt
- JR = Junior Accelerator Programme entrant
- CO = College Accelerator Programme entrant
- NG = Next Gen Accelerator Program entrant
- w/o = Walkover
- r = Retired
- d = Defaulted

First round
1	(Serbia) I Sabanov (Serbia) M Sabanov	6^{4}	4
(France) K Jacquet (France) C Tabur	7^{7}	6
(India) P Raja (India) D Sharan	6	7
(Germany) Niklas Schell (Germany) K Wehnelt	2	5
3	(Netherlands) S Verbeek (Poland) S Walków	7	6
WC	(France) L Poullain (France) Alexandre Reco	5	4
(France) T Arribagé (United Kingdom) L Johnson	6	6
(United States) Jack Vance (United States) Jamie Vance	2	3
(Bulgaria) P Milushev (Bulgaria) R Shandarov	1	4
(Norway) V Durasovic (Finland) P Niklas-Salminen	6	6
(Czech Republic) D Poljak (Ukraine) V Sachko	5	6^{4}
4	(Germany) F Fallert (Germany) H Jebens	7	7^{7}
(Uzbekistan) K Sultanov (Ukraine) V Uzhylovskyi	4	2
WC	(France) A Cazaux (France) A Fils	6	6
(France) A Escoffier (Germany) D Masur	6	3	[4]
2	(Netherlands) S Arends (Netherlands) D Pel	4	6	[10]

Quarterfinals
(France) K Jacquet (France) C Tabur	1	4
(India) P Raja (India) D Sharan	6	6
3	(Netherlands) S Verbeek (Poland) S Walków	6	3	[4]
(France) T Arribagé (United Kingdom) L Johnson	2	6	[10]
(Norway) V Durasovic (Finland) P Niklas-Salminen	7^{7}	3	[10]
4	(Germany) F Fallert (Germany) H Jebens	6^{1}	6	[7]
WC	(France) A Cazaux (France) A Fils
2	(Netherlands) S Arends (Netherlands) D Pel	w/o

Semifinals
(India) P Raja (India) D Sharan	4	7	[10]
(France) T Arribagé (United Kingdom) L Johnson	6	5	[7]
(Norway) V Durasovic (Finland) P Niklas-Salminen	4	3
2	(Netherlands) S Arends (Netherlands) D Pel	6	6

Final
(India) P Raja (India) D Sharan	7^{7}	6^{6}	[6]
2	(Netherlands) S Arends (Netherlands) D Pel	6^{1}	7^{8}	[10]
