= 2020 Sofia Open =

- Date: 8–14 November
- Edition: 5th
- Category: ATP Tour 250 Series
- Draw: 28S /16D
- Prize money: €325,615
- Surface: Hard / indoor
- Location: Sofia, Bulgaria
- Venue: Arena Armeec

Champions

Singles
- (Italy) Jannik Sinner

Doubles
- (United Kingdom) Jamie Murray / (United Kingdom) Neal Skupski
← 2019 ·	Sofia Open	· 2021 →

The 2020 Sofia Open was a men's tennis tournament played on indoor hard courts. It was the fifth edition of the Sofia Open as part of the ATP Tour 250 series of the 2020 ATP Tour. Originally scheduled for 28 September to 4 October at the Arena Armeec in Sofia, Bulgaria, but due to the COVID-19 pandemic it was rescheduled to 8 November until 14 November 2020. Unseeded Jannik Sinner won the singles title.

== Finals ==
=== Singles ===
- (Italy) Jannik Sinner defeated (Canada) Vasek Pospisil, 6–4, 3–6, 7–6^{(7–3)}

=== Doubles ===
- (United Kingdom) Jamie Murray / (United Kingdom) Neal Skupski defeated (Austria) Jürgen Melzer / (France) Édouard Roger-Vasselin, walkover

== Singles main-draw entrants ==
=== Seeds ===
Country	Player	Rank^{1}	Seed
CAN	Denis Shapovalov	12	1
CAN	Félix Auger-Aliassime	21	2
AUS	Alex de Minaur	25	3
GER	Jan-Lennard Struff	35	4
FRA	Adrian Mannarino	36	5
AUS	John Millman	38	6
GEO	Nikoloz Basilashvili	39	7
CRO	Marin Čilić	43	8

- ^{1} Rankings as of 2 November 2020

=== Other entrants ===
The following players received wildcards into the singles main draw:

- (Bulgaria) Adrian Andreev
- (Bulgaria) Dimitar Kuzmanov
- (Czech Republic) Jonáš Forejtek

The following players received entry from the qualifying draw:

- (Japan) Taro Daniel
- (Russia) Aslan Karatsev
- (France) Gilles Simon
- (Serbia) Viktor Troicki

The following players received entry as lucky losers:

- (Switzerland) Marc-Andrea Hüsler
- (Slovakia) Martin Kližan
- (Ukraine) Illya Marchenko

=== Withdrawals ===
- (South Africa) Kevin Anderson → replaced by (Italy) Jannik Sinner
- (Spain) Roberto Bautista Agut → replaced by (France) Adrian Mannarino
- (Spain) Pablo Carreño Busta → replaced by (Slovakia) Andrej Martin
- (Croatia) Borna Ćorić → replaced by (Switzerland) Marc-Andrea Hüsler
- (Italy) Fabio Fognini → replaced by (Croatia) Marin Čilić
- (United States) Taylor Fritz → replaced by (Italy) Salvatore Caruso
- (Russia) Karen Khachanov → replaced by (Ukraine) Illya Marchenko
- (Serbia) Filip Krajinović → replaced by (Spain) Roberto Carballes Baena
- (Serbia) Dušan Lajović → replaced by (Belarus) Egor Gerasimov
- (France) Gaël Monfils → replaced by (Slovakia) Martin Kližan
- (Japan) Kei Nishikori → replaced by (Hungary) Márton Fucsovics
- (Canada) Milos Raonic → replaced by (Moldova) Radu Albot
- (Norway) Casper Ruud → replaced by (Australia) John Millman
- (Argentina) Diego Schwartzman → replaced by (Japan) Yūichi Sugita

== Doubles main-draw entrants ==
=== Seeds ===
Country	Player	Country	Player	Rank^{1}	Seed
AUT	Jürgen Melzer	FRA	Édouard Roger-Vasselin	49	1
GBR	Jamie Murray	GBR	Neal Skupski	50	2
AUS	Max Purcell	AUS	Luke Saville	75	3
BEL	Sander Gillé	BEL	Joran Vliegen	78	4

- ^{1} Rankings are as of 2 November 2020.

=== Other entrants ===
The following pairs received wildcards into the doubles main draw:

- (Bulgaria) Alexander Donski / (Bulgaria) Vasko Mladenov
- (Bulgaria) Dimitar Kuzmanov / (Serbia) Viktor Troicki
