= 2018 Diema Xtra Sofia Open – Doubles =

Doubles
- 2018 Diema Xtra Sofia Open

Final
- Champions: (Netherlands) Robin Haase (Netherlands) Matwé Middelkoop
- Runners-up: (Croatia) Nikola Mektić (Austria) Alexander Peya
- Score: 5–7, 6–4, [10–4]

Details
- Draw: 16
- Seeds: 4

Events
Singles	Doubles
← 2017 ·	Diema Xtra Sofia Open	· 2019 →

Viktor Troicki and Nenad Zimonjić were the defending champions, but lost in the first round to Robin Haase and Matwé Middelkoop.

Haase and Middelkoop went on to win the title, defeating Nikola Mektić and Alexander Peya in the final, 5–7, 6–4, [10–4].

== Seeds ==
1. (Poland) Marcin Matkowski / (Pakistan) Aisam-ul-Haq Qureshi (first round)
2. (Croatia) Nikola Mektić / (Austria) Alexander Peya (final)
3. (United States) Nicholas Monroe / (Australia) John-Patrick Smith (semifinals)
4. (Netherlands) Robin Haase / (Netherlands) Matwé Middelkoop (champions)

== Draw ==
=== Key ===
- Q = Qualifier
- WC = Wild card
- LL = Lucky loser
- Alt = Alternate
- SE = Special exempt
- PR = Protected ranking
- ITF = ITF entry
- JE = Junior exempt
- w/o = Walkover
- r = Retired
- d = Defaulted
- SR = Special ranking

=== Draw ===
First round
1	(Poland) M Matkowski (Pakistan) A-u-H Qureshi	6^{4}	6	[8]
(Monaco) R Arneodo (Austria) T-S Weissborn	7^{7}	1	[10]
WC	(Bulgaria) D Kuzmanov (Bulgaria) V Mladenov	4	4
(United States) S Lipsky (India) D Sharan	6	6
4	(Netherlands) R Haase (Netherlands) M Middelkoop	6	6
(Serbia) V Troicki (Serbia) N Zimonjić	4	4
(Sweden) R Lindstedt (Canada) D Nestor	3	7^{7}	[10]
(Israel) J Erlich (Germany) P Petzschner	6	6^{5}	[5]
WC	(Bulgaria) A Donski (Bulgaria) A Lazov	3	4
(United States) J Cerretani (Belgium) S Gillé	6	6
(Romania) M Copil (Romania) F Mergea	6	1	[6]
3	(United States) N Monroe (Australia) J-P Smith	4	6	[10]
Alt	(Bulgaria) R Shandarov (Bulgaria) V Shandarov	1	2
(Germany) M Marterer (Portugal) J Sousa	6	6
(Russia) E Donskoy (Russia) M Youzhny	2	4
2	(Croatia) N Mektić (Austria) A Peya	6	6

Quarterfinals
(Monaco) R Arneodo (Austria) T-S Weissborn	4	7^{7}	[5]
(United States) S Lipsky (India) D Sharan	6	6^{4}	[10]
4	(Netherlands) R Haase (Netherlands) M Middelkoop	7	5	[10]
(Sweden) R Lindstedt (Canada) D Nestor	5	7	[4]
(United States) J Cerretani (Belgium) S Gillé	3	7^{7}	[3]
3	(United States) N Monroe (Australia) J-P Smith	6	6^{2}	[10]
(Germany) M Marterer (Portugal) J Sousa	3	3
2	(Croatia) N Mektić (Austria) A Peya	6	6

Semifinals
(United States) S Lipsky (India) D Sharan	4	2
4	(Netherlands) R Haase (Netherlands) M Middelkoop	6	6
3	(United States) N Monroe (Australia) J-P Smith	2	4
2	(Croatia) N Mektić (Austria) A Peya	6	6

Final
4	(Netherlands) R Haase (Netherlands) M Middelkoop	5	6	[10]
2	(Croatia) N Mektić (Austria) A Peya	7	4	[4]
