= 2021 Sofia Open – Doubles =

Doubles
- 2021 Sofia Open

Final
- Champions: (United Kingdom) Jonny O'Mara (United Kingdom) Ken Skupski
- Runners-up: (Austria) Oliver Marach (Austria) Philipp Oswald
- Score: 6–3, 6–4

Details
- Draw: 16
- Seeds: 4

Events
Singles	Doubles
← 2020 ·	ATP Sofia Open	· 2022 →

Jamie Murray and Neal Skupski were the defending champions, but chose to compete in San Diego with different partners instead.

Jonny O'Mara and Ken Skupski won the title, defeating Oliver Marach and Philipp Oswald in the final, 6–3, 6–4.

== Seeds ==
1. (Finland) Henri Kontinen / (Japan) Ben McLachlan (first round)
2. (Bosnia and Herzegovina) Tomislav Brkić / (Serbia) Nikola Ćaćić (quarterfinals)
3. (Austria) Oliver Marach / (Austria) Philipp Oswald (final)
4. (Australia) Luke Saville / (Australia) John-Patrick Smith (quarterfinals)

== Draw ==
=== Key ===
- Q = Qualifier
- WC = Wild card
- LL = Lucky loser
- Alt = Alternate
- SE = Special exempt
- PR = Protected ranking
- ITF = ITF entry
- JE = Junior exempt
- w/o = Walkover
- r = Retired
- d = Defaulted
- SR = Special ranking

=== Draw ===
First round
1	(Finland) H Kontinen (Japan) B McLachlan	6	6^{4}	[6]
(Israel) J Erlich (United Kingdom) D Inglot	4	7^{7}	[10]
(Czech Republic) R Jebavý (Netherlands) M Middelkoop	6	6
WC	(Bulgaria) A Andreev (Bulgaria) A Lazarov	2	4
4	(Australia) L Saville (Australia) J-P Smith	7^{7}	7^{7}
(Sweden) A Göransson (Monaco) H Nys	6^{4}	6^{2}
WC	(Bulgaria) A Donski (Bulgaria) D Kuzmanov	6	5	[7]
(United Kingdom) J O'Mara (United Kingdom) K Skupski	2	7	[10]
(Italy) L Musetti (Italy) A Vavassori	3	6^{8}
(Brazil) M Demoliner (Brazil) R Matos	6	7^{10}
(India) R Bopanna (Pakistan) A-u-H Qureshi	2	7^{7}	[7]
3	(Austria) O Marach (Austria) P Oswald	6	6^{1}	[10]
(Mexico) S González (Argentina) A Molteni	6	6
Alt	(Bulgaria) P Milushev (Bulgaria) R Shandarov	3	4
(Kazakhstan) A Golubev (Kazakhstan) A Nedovyesov	3	7^{7}	[7]
2	(Bosnia and Herzegovina) T Brkić (Serbia) N Ćaćić	6	6^{2}	[10]

Quarterfinals
(Israel) J Erlich (United Kingdom) D Inglot	2	5
(Czech Republic) R Jebavý (Netherlands) M Middelkoop	6	7
4	(Australia) L Saville (Australia) J-P Smith	3	6	[8]
(United Kingdom) J O'Mara (United Kingdom) K Skupski	6	2	[10]
(Brazil) M Demoliner (Brazil) R Matos	6^{6}	6^{3}
3	(Austria) O Marach (Austria) P Oswald	7^{8}	7^{7}
(Mexico) S González (Argentina) A Molteni	6^{5}	6	[10]
2	(Bosnia and Herzegovina) T Brkić (Serbia) N Ćaćić	7^{7}	2	[4]

Semifinals
(Czech Republic) R Jebavý (Netherlands) M Middelkoop	3	1
(United Kingdom) J O'Mara (United Kingdom) K Skupski	6	6
3	(Austria) O Marach (Austria) P Oswald	2	7	[10]
(Mexico) S González (Argentina) A Molteni	6	5	[6]

Final
(United Kingdom) J O'Mara (United Kingdom) K Skupski	6	6
3	(Austria) O Marach (Austria) P Oswald	3	4
