= 2020 Sofia Open – Doubles =

Doubles
- 2020 Sofia Open

Final
- Champions: (United Kingdom) Jamie Murray (United Kingdom) Neal Skupski
- Runners-up: (Austria) Jürgen Melzer (France) Édouard Roger-Vasselin
- Score: Walkover

Details
- Draw: 16
- Seeds: 4

Events
Singles	Doubles
← 2019 ·	ATP Sofia Open	· 2021 →

Nikola Mektić and Jürgen Melzer were the defending champions, but Mektić chose not to participate.

Jamie Murray and Neal Skupski won the title, defeating Melzer and Édouard Roger-Vasselin in the final via walkover.

== Seeds ==
1. (Austria) Jürgen Melzer / (France) Édouard Roger-Vasselin (final, withdrew)
2. (United Kingdom) Jamie Murray / (United Kingdom) Neal Skupski (champions)
3. (Australia) Max Purcell / (Australia) Luke Saville (first round)
4. (Belgium) Sander Gillé / (Belgium) Joran Vliegen (first round)

== Draw ==
=== Key ===
- Q = Qualifier
- WC = Wild card
- LL = Lucky loser
- Alt = Alternate
- SE = Special exempt
- PR = Protected ranking
- ITF = ITF entry
- JE = Junior exempt
- w/o = Walkover
- r = Retired
- d = Defaulted
- SR = Special ranking

=== Draw ===
First round
1	(Austria) J Melzer (France) É Roger-Vasselin	6	6
WC	(Bulgaria) D Kuzmanov (Serbia) V Troicki	2	4
(United Kingdom) J O'Mara (United Kingdom) K Skupski	6	6
WC	(Bulgaria) A Donski (Bulgaria) V Mladenov	3	4
3	(Australia) M Purcell (Australia) L Saville	6^{4}	2
(Bosnia and Herzegovina) T Brkić (Croatia) M Čilić	7^{7}	6
(Serbia) N Ćaćić (Pakistan) A-u-H Qureshi	3	6	[11]
(Denmark) F Nielsen (Germany) T Pütz	6	2	[9]
(Israel) J Erlich (Belarus) A Vasilevski	4	3
(France) F Martin (Monaco) H Nys	6	6
(El Salvador) M Arévalo (Netherlands) M Middelkoop	6	6
4	(Belgium) S Gillé (Belgium) J Vliegen	3	4
(Australia) A de Minaur (Spain) D Vega Hernández	6	6^{4}	[9]
(Moldova) R Albot (New Zealand) A Sitak	3	7^{7}	[11]
(India) D Sharan (Slovakia) I Zelenay	3	6	[6]
2	(United Kingdom) J Murray (United Kingdom) N Skupski	6	3	[10]

Quarterfinals
1	(Austria) J Melzer (France) É Roger-Vasselin	6	6
(United Kingdom) J O'Mara (United Kingdom) K Skupski	4	2
(Bosnia and Herzegovina) T Brkić (Croatia) M Čilić	7^{7}	7^{7}
(Serbia) N Ćaćić (Pakistan) A-u-H Qureshi	6^{4}	6^{3}
(France) F Martin (Monaco) H Nys	6	2	[10]
(El Salvador) M Arévalo (Netherlands) M Middelkoop	4	6	[6]
(Moldova) R Albot (New Zealand) A Sitak	4	2
2	(United Kingdom) J Murray (United Kingdom) N Skupski	6	6

Semifinals
1	(Austria) J Melzer (France) É Roger-Vasselin	7	6
(Bosnia and Herzegovina) T Brkić (Croatia) M Čilić	5	4
(France) F Martin (Monaco) H Nys	6^{4}	7^{7}	[4]
2	(United Kingdom) J Murray (United Kingdom) N Skupski	7^{7}	6^{2}	[10]

Final
1	(Austria) J Melzer (France) É Roger-Vasselin
2	(United Kingdom) J Murray (United Kingdom) N Skupski	w/o
