= 2018 Diema Xtra Sofia Open – Singles =

Singles
- 2018 Diema Xtra Sofia Open

Final
- Champion: (Bosnia and Herzegovina) Mirza Bašić
- Runner-up: (Romania) Marius Copil
- Score: 7–6^{(8–6)}, 6–7^{(4–7)}, 6–4

Details
- Draw: 28 (4 Q / 3 WC )
- Seeds: 8

Events
Singles	Doubles
← 2017 ·	Diema Xtra Sofia Open	· 2019 →

Grigor Dimitrov was the defending champion, but withdrew before the tournament because of a shoulder injury.

Mirza Bašić won his first ATP title, defeating Marius Copil in the final, 7–6^{(8–6)}, 6–7^{(4–7)}, 6–4.

== Seeds ==
The top four seeds receive a bye into the second round.

1. (Switzerland) Stan Wawrinka (semifinals)
2. (France) Adrian Mannarino (second round)
3. (Luxembourg) Gilles Müller (quarterfinals)
4. (Germany) Philipp Kohlschreiber (second round)
5. (Netherlands) Robin Haase (first round)
6. (Serbia) Viktor Troicki (quarterfinals)
7. (Portugal) João Sousa (second round)
8. (Russia) Evgeny Donskoy (first round)

== Draw ==
Key

- Q = Qualifier
- WC = Wild card
- LL = Lucky loser
- Alt = Alternate
- ITF = ITF entry
- PR = Protected ranking
- SR = Special ranking
- SE = Special exempt
- JE = Junior exempt
- JR = Junior Accelerator Programme entrant
- CO = College Accelerator Programme entrant
- NG = Next Gen Accelerator Program entrant
- w/o = Walkover
- r = Retired
- d = Defaulted

=== Finals ===
Semifinals
1	(Switzerland) Stan Wawrinka	6^{6}	4
Q	(Bosnia and Herzegovina) Mirza Bašić	7^{8}	6
(Romania) Marius Copil	6	6
Q	(Slovakia) Jozef Kovalík	4	2

Final
Q	(Bosnia and Herzegovina) Mirza Bašić	7^{8}	6^{4}	6
(Romania) Marius Copil	6^{6}	7^{7}	4

=== Top half ===
First round
Q	(Slovakia) M Kližan	7	6
WC	(Bulgaria) A Donski	5	1
WC	(Bulgaria) A Andreev	3	4
(Uzbekistan) D Istomin	6	6
Q	(Latvia) E Gulbis	3	7^{7}	3
6	(Serbia) V Troicki	6	6^{2}	6
LL	(Germany) F Mayer	4	1
Q	(Bosnia and Herzegovina) M Bašić	6	6
(Germany) M Marterer	7^{7}	6
(Tunisia) M Jaziri	6^{3}	4
WC	(Bulgaria) D Kuzmanov	6^{6}	1
7	(Portugal) J Sousa	7^{8}	6

Second round
1	(Switzerland) S Wawrinka	4	6	6
Q	(Slovakia) M Kližan	6	2	3
(Uzbekistan) D Istomin	6^{4}	6	6^{5}
6	(Serbia) V Troicki	7^{7}	1	7^{7}
4	(Germany) P Kohlschreiber	5	6^{5}
Q	(Bosnia and Herzegovina) M Bašić	7	7^{7}
(Germany) M Marterer	7	7^{8}
7	(Portugal) J Sousa	5	6^{6}

Quarterfinals
1	(Switzerland) S Wawrinka	6	7^{7}
6	(Serbia) V Troicki	1	6^{3}
Q	(Bosnia and Herzegovina) M Bašić	6	4	6
(Germany) M Marterer	4	6	3

Semifinals
1	(Switzerland) S Wawrinka	6^{6}	4
Q	(Bosnia and Herzegovina) M Bašić	7^{8}	6

=== Bottom half ===
First round
5	(Netherlands) R Haase	6^{5}	4
(Romania) M Copil	7^{7}	6
(Serbia) L Đere	4	4
(Slovenia) B Kavčič	6	6
(Russia) M Youzhny	3	4
(Italy) A Seppi	6	6
8	(Russia) E Donskoy	4	4
(Slovakia) L Lacko	6	6
Q	(Slovakia) J Kovalík	6	6
(Moldova) R Albot	3	3
(Cyprus) M Baghdatis	7^{7}	6
LL	(Italy) S Caruso	6^{4}	3

Second round
(Romania) M Copil	6	6
(Slovenia) B Kavčič	2	2
(Italy) A Seppi	6	6^{5}	6^{2}
3	(Luxembourg) G Müller	4	7^{7}	7^{7}
(Slovakia) L Lacko	6	2	5
Q	(Slovakia) J Kovalík	4	6	7
(Cyprus) M Baghdatis	6^{4}	6	6
2	(France) A Mannarino	7^{7}	3	1

Quarterfinals
(Romania) M Copil	6	6
3	(Luxembourg) G Müller	4	4
Q	(Slovakia) J Kovalík	7^{7}	6
(Cyprus) M Baghdatis	6^{2}	4

Semifinals
(Romania) M Copil	6	6
Q	(Slovakia) J Kovalík	4	2

== Qualifying ==
=== Seeds ===
1. (Germany) Florian Mayer (qualifying competition, lucky loser)
2. (Bosnia and Herzegovina) Mirza Bašić (qualified)
3. (Germany) Oscar Otte (qualifying competition)
4. (Slovakia) Martin Kližan (qualified)
5. (Germany) Mats Moraing (first round)
6. (Italy) Lorenzo Sonego (first round)
7. (Italy) Salvatore Caruso (qualifying competition, lucky loser)
8. (Slovakia) Jozef Kovalík (qualified)

=== Qualifiers ===
1. (Latvia) Ernests Gulbis
2. (Bosnia and Herzegovina) Mirza Bašić
3. (Slovakia) Jozef Kovalík
4. (Slovakia) Martin Kližan

=== Lucky losers ===
1. (Germany) Florian Mayer
2. (Italy) Salvatore Caruso

=== Qualifying draw ===
==== First qualifier ====
First round
1	(Germany) Florian Mayer	7^{7}	7^{7}
(Australia) John-Patrick Smith	6^{5}	6^{1}
(Latvia) Ernests Gulbis	6^{5}	7^{7}	7^{7}
6	(Italy) Lorenzo Sonego	7^{7}	6^{2}	6^{2}

Qualifying competition
1	(Germany) Florian Mayer	4	1
(Latvia) Ernests Gulbis	6	6

==== Second qualifier ====
First round
2	(Bosnia and Herzegovina) Mirza Bašić	6^{2}	7^{7}	6
WC	(Bulgaria) Alexandar Lazov	7^{7}	6^{3}	4
(Bosnia and Herzegovina) Tomislav Brkić	5	6	7^{7}
5	(Germany) Mats Moraing	7	3	6^{4}

Qualifying competition
2	(Bosnia and Herzegovina) Mirza Bašić	7	6
(Bosnia and Herzegovina) Tomislav Brkić	5	4

==== Third qualifier ====
First round
3	(Germany) Oscar Otte	6^{3}	7	6
WC	(Bulgaria) Alexandar Lazarov	7^{7}	5	1
(Italy) Stefano Napolitano	6	4	3
8	(Slovakia) Jozef Kovalík	4	6	6

Qualifying competition
3	(Germany) Oscar Otte	3	3
8	(Slovakia) Jozef Kovalík	6	6

==== Fourth qualifier ====
First round
4	(Slovakia) Martin Kližan	6	6
(Germany) Tobias Kamke	4	3
(Italy) Luca Vanni	6^{2}	3
7	(Italy) Salvatore Caruso	7^{7}	6

Qualifying competition
4	(Slovakia) Martin Kližan	1	6	6
7	(Italy) Salvatore Caruso	6	4	3
