= 2020 Sofia Open – Singles =

Singles
- 2020 Sofia Open

Final
- Champion: (Italy) Jannik Sinner
- Runner-up: (Canada) Vasek Pospisil
- Score: 6–4, 3–6, 7–6^{(7–3)}

Details
- Draw: 28 (4 Q / 3 WC )
- Seeds: 8

Events
Singles	Doubles
- ATP Sofia Open

Jannik Sinner defeated Vasek Pospisil in the final, 6–4, 3–6, 7–6^{(7–3)} to win the singles tennis title at the 2020 Sofia Open. It was his first ATP Tour title.

Daniil Medvedev was the reigning champion, but chose not to defend his title.

== Seeds ==
The top four seeds received a bye into the second round.

1. (Canada) Denis Shapovalov (second round)
2. (Canada) Félix Auger-Aliassime (second round)
3. (Australia) Alex de Minaur (quarterfinals)
4. (Germany) Jan-Lennard Struff (second round)
5. (France) Adrian Mannarino (semifinals)
6. (Australia) John Millman (quarterfinals)
7. (Georgia (country)) Nikoloz Basilashvili (first round)
8. (Croatia) Marin Čilić (first round)

== Draw ==
Key

- Q = Qualifier
- WC = Wild card
- LL = Lucky loser
- Alt = Alternate
- ITF = ITF entry
- PR = Protected ranking
- SR = Special ranking
- SE = Special exempt
- JE = Junior exempt
- JR = Junior Accelerator Programme entrant
- CO = College Accelerator Programme entrant
- NG = Next Gen Accelerator Program entrant
- w/o = Walkover
- r = Retired
- d = Defaulted

=== Finals ===
Semifinals
5	(France) Adrian Mannarino	3	5
(Italy) Jannik Sinner	6	7
(Canada) Vasek Pospisil	6^{6}	6	6
(France) Richard Gasquet	7^{8}	2	0

Final
(Italy) Jannik Sinner	6	3	7^{7}
(Canada) Vasek Pospisil	4	6	6^{3}

=== Top half ===
First round
(Moldova) R Albot	6	6
(Japan) Y Sugita	4	1
(Belarus) E Gerasimov	6	3	6
Q	(Serbia) V Troicki	3	6	3
LL	(Slovakia) M Kližan	6	1	5
5	(France) A Mannarino	3	6	7
Q	(Japan) T Daniel	6^{2}	1
Q	(Russia) A Karatsev	7^{7}	6
(Hungary) M Fucsovics	2	4
(Italy) J Sinner	6	6
LL	(Switzerland) M-A Hüsler	6	4	7^{8}
7	(Georgia (country)) N Basilashvili	1	6	6^{6}

Second round
1	(Canada) D Shapovalov	2	4
(Moldova) R Albot	6	6
(Belarus) E Gerasimov	4	6^{6}
5	(France) A Mannarino	6	7^{8}
3	(Australia) A de Minaur	6	7^{7}
Q	(Russia) A Karatsev	4	6^{5}
(Italy) J Sinner	6	6
LL	(Switzerland) M-A Hüsler	3	4

Quarterfinals
(Moldova) R Albot	2	6	3
5	(France) A Mannarino	6	1	6
3	(Australia) A de Minaur	7^{7}	4	1
(Italy) J Sinner	6^{3}	6	6

Semifinals
5	(France) A Mannarino	3	5
(Italy) J Sinner	6	7

=== Bottom half ===
First round
6	(Australia) J Millman	6	6
WC	(Bulgaria) A Andreev	3	1
Q	(France) G Simon	6	6
(Slovakia) A Martin	2	2
(Canada) V Pospisil	6	5	7^{7}
LL	(Ukraine) I Marchenko	2	7	6^{5}
8	(Croatia) M Čilić	3	2
WC	(Czech Republic) J Forejtek	6	6
(Spain) R Carballés Baena	3	4
(France) R Gasquet	6	6
(Italy) S Caruso	4	6	6
WC	(Bulgaria) D Kuzmanov	6	4	4

Second round
6	(Australia) J Millman	7	6^{3}	6
Q	(France) G Simon	5	7^{7}	2
(Canada) V Pospisil	6	6
4	(Germany) J-L Struff	3	4
WC	(Czech Republic) J Forejtek	4	2
(France) R Gasquet	6	6
(Italy) S Caruso	6	6
2	(Canada) F Auger-Aliassime	4	4

Quarterfinals
6	(Australia) J Millman	3	2
(Canada) V Pospisil	6	6
(France) R Gasquet	7^{7}	7
(Italy) S Caruso	6^{4}	5

Semifinals
(Canada) V Pospisil	6^{6}	6	6
(France) R Gasquet	7^{8}	2	0

== Qualifying ==
=== Seeds ===
1. (France) Gilles Simon (qualified)
2. (Japan) Yūichi Sugita (moved to main draw)
3. (Russia) Aslan Karatsev (qualified)
4. (Japan) Taro Daniel (qualified)
5. (Russia) Evgeny Donskoy (first round)
6. (Slovakia) Jozef Kovalík (first round)
7. (Slovakia) Martin Kližan (qualifying competition, lucky loser)
8. (Switzerland) Marc-Andrea Hüsler (qualifying competition, lucky loser)

=== Qualifiers ===
1. (France) Gilles Simon
2. (Serbia) Viktor Troicki
3. (Russia) Aslan Karatsev
4. (Japan) Taro Daniel

=== Lucky losers ===
1. (Ukraine) Illya Marchenko
2. (Slovakia) Martin Kližan
3. (Switzerland) Marc-Andrea Hüsler

=== Qualifying draw ===
==== First qualifier ====
First round
1	(France) Gilles Simon	6	6
Alt	(Australia) Luke Saville	4	3
(Ukraine) Illya Marchenko	7	6
6	(Slovakia) Jozef Kovalík	5	3

Qualifying competition
1	(France) Gilles Simon	6	6
(Ukraine) Illya Marchenko	2	3

==== Second qualifier ====
First round
Alt	(Italy) Fabrizio Ornago	6	1	6
WC	(Bulgaria) Gabriel Donev	3	6	2
(Serbia) Viktor Troicki	6	6^{2}	6
5	(Russia) Evgeny Donskoy	4	7^{7}	4

Qualifying competition
Alt	(Italy) Fabrizio Ornago	2	4
(Serbia) Viktor Troicki	6	6

==== Third qualifier ====
First round
3	(Russia) Aslan Karatsev	6	6
WC	(Bulgaria) Alexander Donski	2	3
(Portugal) Frederico Ferreira Silva	4	5
8	(Switzerland) Marc-Andrea Hüsler	6	7

Qualifying competition
3	(Russia) Aslan Karatsev	7^{7}	6
8	(Switzerland) Marc-Andrea Hüsler	6^{2}	4

==== Fourth qualifier ====
First round
4	(Japan) Taro Daniel	6	6
(Czech Republic) Zdeněk Kolář	4	3
(Australia) Max Purcell	5	4
7	(Slovakia) Martin Kližan	7	6

Qualifying competition
4	(Japan) Taro Daniel	6	6
7	(Slovakia) Martin Kližan	3	4
