= 2019 Sofia Open – Doubles =

Doubles
- 2019 Sofia Open

Final
- Champions: (Croatia) Nikola Mektić (Austria) Jürgen Melzer
- Runners-up: (Chinese Taipei) Hsieh Cheng-peng (Indonesia) Christopher Rungkat
- Score: 6–2, 4–6, [10–2]

Details
- Draw: 16
- Seeds: 4

Events
Singles	Doubles
← 2018 ·	ATP Sofia Open	· 2020 →

Robin Haase and Matwé Middelkoop were the defending champions, but lost to Jeevan Nedunchezhiyan and Purav Raja in the quarterfinals.

Nikola Mektić and Jürgen Melzer won the title, defeating Hsieh Cheng-peng and Christopher Rungkat in the final, 6–2, 4–6, [10–2].

== Seeds ==
1. (Netherlands) Jean-Julien Rojer / (Romania) Horia Tecău (first round)
2. (United Kingdom) Dominic Inglot / (Croatia) Franko Škugor (first round)
3. (India) Rohan Bopanna / (India) Divij Sharan (semifinals)
4. (Netherlands) Robin Haase / (Netherlands) Matwé Middelkoop (quarterfinals)

== Draw ==
=== Key ===
- Q = Qualifier
- WC = Wild card
- LL = Lucky loser
- Alt = Alternate
- SE = Special exempt
- PR = Protected ranking
- ITF = ITF entry
- JE = Junior exempt
- w/o = Walkover
- r = Retired
- d = Defaulted
- SR = Special ranking

=== Draw ===
First round
1	(Netherlands) J-J Rojer (Romania) H Tecău	4	6^{7}
(Ukraine) D Molchanov (Slovakia) I Zelenay	6	7^{9}
(Chinese Taipei) C-p Hsieh (Indonesia) C Rungkat	7^{7}	6
(Romania) M Copil (Hungary) M Fucsovics	6^{4}	1
3	(India) R Bopanna (India) D Sharan	7^{7}	6
PR	(Croatia) M Pavić (Serbia) N Zimonjić	6^{2}	2
WC	(Bulgaria) A Donski (Bulgaria) A Lazarov	w/o
(Georgia (country)) N Basilashvili (Australia) M Ebden
(India) J Nedunchezhiyan (India) P Raja	6	6
(United States) R Galloway (United States) N Lammons	4	4
WC	(Bulgaria) A Andreev (Bulgaria) D Kuzmanov	2	2
4	(Netherlands) R Haase (Netherlands) M Middelkoop	6	6
(Croatia) N Mektić (Austria) J Melzer	7^{7}	7
(Mexico) S González (Pakistan) A-u-H Qureshi	6^{4}	5
(Italy) S Bolelli (Italy) A Seppi	6	1	[11]
2	(United Kingdom) D Inglot (Croatia) F Škugor	3	6	[9]

Quarterfinals
(Ukraine) D Molchanov (Slovakia) I Zelenay	6^{3}	6^{4}
(Chinese Taipei) C-p Hsieh (Indonesia) C Rungkat	7^{7}	7^{7}
3	(India) R Bopanna (India) D Sharan	6	6
WC	(Bulgaria) A Donski (Bulgaria) A Lazarov	3	1
(India) J Nedunchezhiyan (India) P Raja	7^{8}	7^{12}
4	(Netherlands) R Haase (Netherlands) M Middelkoop	6^{6}	6^{10}
(Croatia) N Mektić (Austria) J Melzer	6^{5}	7^{7}	[10]
(Italy) S Bolelli (Italy) A Seppi	7^{7}	6^{5}	[6]

Semifinals
(Chinese Taipei) C-p Hsieh (Indonesia) C Rungkat	7^{7}	6
3	(India) R Bopanna (India) D Sharan	6^{3}	3
(India) J Nedunchezhiyan (India) P Raja	7	4	[6]
(Croatia) N Mektić (Austria) J Melzer	5	6	[10]

Final
(Chinese Taipei) C-p Hsieh (Indonesia) C Rungkat	2	6	[2]
(Croatia) N Mektić (Austria) J Melzer	6	4	[10]
