= Jelle Sels =

Dutch tennis player

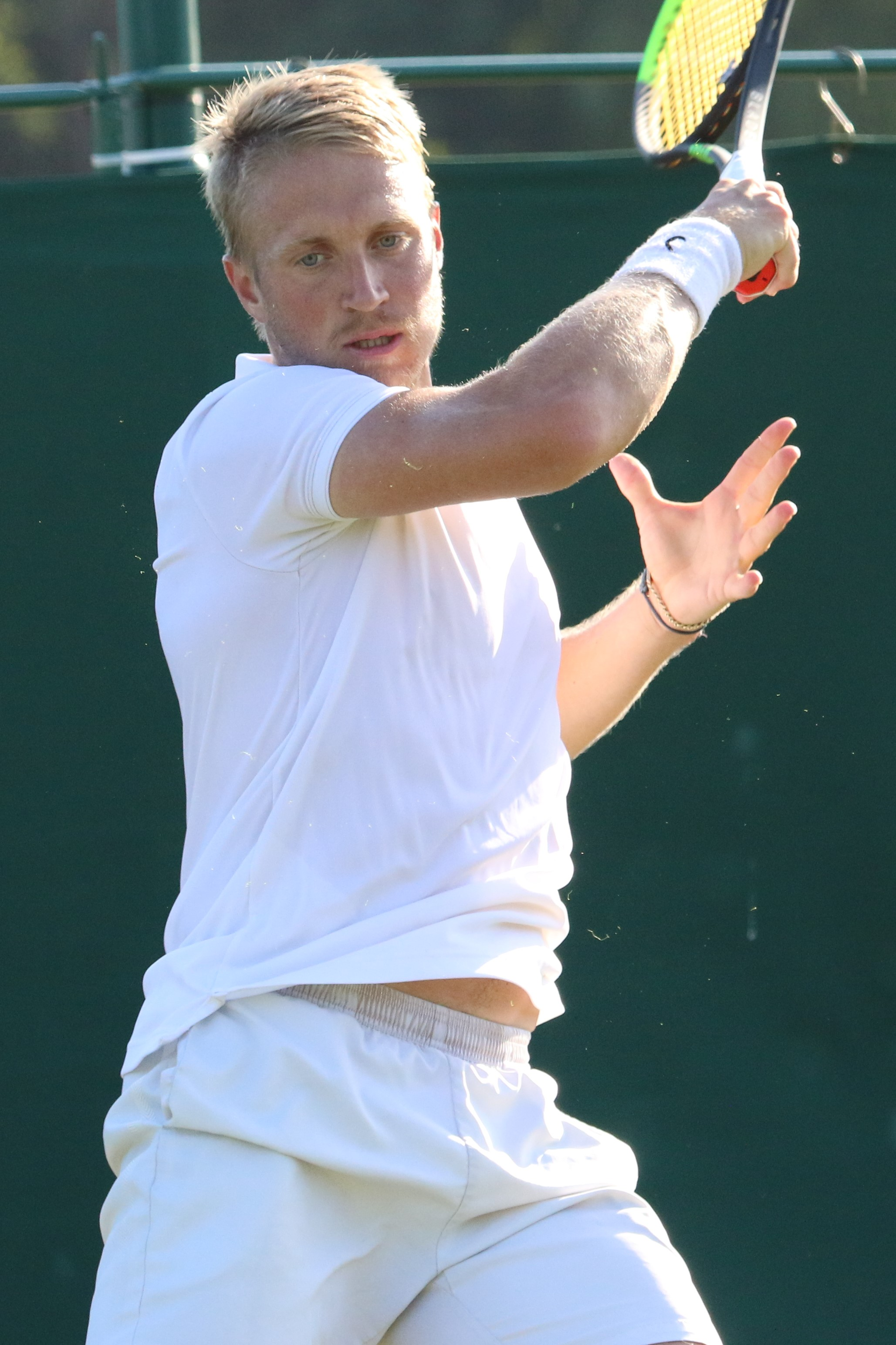
- Sels at the 2022 Wimbledon Championships
- Country (sports): Netherlands
- Born: 10 August 1995 (age 31) Woerden, Netherlands
- Height: 1.88 m (6 ft 2 in)
- Plays: Right-handed (one-handed backhand)
- Prize money: US $413,935

Singles
- Career record: 0–0
- Career titles: 0
- Highest ranking: No. 127 (28 November 2022)
- Current ranking: No. 682 (9 November 2026)

Grand Slam singles results
- French Open: Q1 (2023)
- Wimbledon: Q1 (2022, 2023)
- US Open: Q1 (2023)

Doubles
- Career record: 0–0
- Career titles: 0
- Highest ranking: No. 201 (20 June 2022)
- Current ranking: No. 494 (9 November 2026)
- Last updated on: 9 November 2026.

Jelle Sels (born 10 August 1995) is a Dutch tennis player. He has a career high ATP singles ranking of world No. 127 achieved on 28 November 2022 and a career high doubles ranking of world No. 201 achieved on 20 June 2022. Sels competes mainly in the Challenger tour circuit.

== Career ==
In October 2022, Sels won his maiden ATP Challenger singles title at the 2022 Internationaux de Tennis de Vendée in Mouilleron-le-Captif, France. As a result, he moved more than 30 positions up in the rankings in the top 150 at world No. 141 on 10 October 2022.

== ATP Challenger Tour finals ==
=== Singles: 4 (1 title, 3 runner-ups) ===
Legend ATP Challenger Tour (1–3)	Finals by surface Hard (1–0) Clay (0–3)

Result	W–L	Date	Tournament	Tier	Surface	Opponent	Score
Loss	0–1	Sep 2018	Sibiu, Romania	Challenger	Clay	(Romania) Dragos Dima	3–6, 2–6
Loss	0–2	Sep 2022	Tulln, Austria	Challenger	Clay	(Slovakia) Jozef Kovalík	6–7^{(6–8)}, 6–7^{(3–7)}
Win	1–2	Oct 2022	Mouilleron le Captif, France	Challenger	Hard (i)	(Canada) Vasek Pospisil	6–4, 6–3
Loss	1–3	Sep 2024	Izida Cup II, Bulgaria	Challenger	Clay	(Netherlands) Guy den Ouden	2–6, 3–6

=== Doubles: 1 (1 runner-up) ===
Legend ATP Challenger Tour (0–1)

Result	W–L	Date	Tournament	Tier	Surface	Partner	Opponents	Score
Loss	0–1	Jan 2022	Forlì III, Italy	Challenger	Hard (i)	(Czech Republic) Jonáš Forejtek	(Romania) Victor Vlad Cornea (Germany) Fabian Fallert	4–6, 7–6^{(8–6)}, [7–10]

== ITF Futures/World Tennis Tour finals ==
=== Singles: 17 (6 titles, 11 runner-ups) ===
Legend ITF Futures/WTT (6–11)	Finals by surface Hard (1–4) Clay (5–7) Grass (0–0) Carpet (0–0)

Result	W–L	Date	Tournament	Tier	Surface	Opponent	Score
Loss	0–1	Jun 2016	Netherlands F3, Middelburg	Futures	Clay	(Netherlands) Jesse Huta Galung	3–6, 2–6
Loss	0–2	Jul 2016	Netherlands F4, Amstelveen	Futures	Clay	(Georgia (country)) Aleksandre Metreveli	2–6, 0–6
Loss	0–3	Aug 2017	Netherlands F7, Schoonhoven	Futures	Clay	(Austria) Gibril Diarra	3–6, 6–3, 3–6
Loss	0–4	Oct 2017	Egypt F30, Sharm El Sheikh	Futures	Hard	(Netherlands) Gijs Brouwer	3–6, 4–6
Win	1–4	Mar 2018	Bahrain F1, Manama	Futures	Hard	(Switzerland) Riccardo Maiga	6–7^{(6–8)}, 6–1, 6–3
Win	2–4	Jul 2018	Netherlands F2, Den Haag	Futures	Clay	(Russia) Alexander Zhurbin	6–2, 6–3
Win	3–4	Jul 2018	Italy F18, Casinalbo	Futures	Clay	(China) Zhang Zhizhen	6–0, 6–3
Loss	3–5	Sep 2018	Italy F26, Trieste	Futures	Clay	(Netherlands) Gijs Brouwer	4–6, 4–6
Loss	3–6	Oct 2020	M25 Rodez, France	WTT	Hard	(Netherlands) Igor Sijsling	3–6, 3–6
Win	4–6	Jun 2021	M25 Alkmaar, Netherlands	WTT	Clay	(Spain) Nicolás Álvarez Varona	6–1, 6–3
Loss	4–7	Jul 2021	M25 Den Haag, Netherlands	WTT	Clay	(Spain) Javier Barranco Cosano	6–2, 1–6, 1–6
Loss	4–8	Jun 2022	M25 Den Haag, Netherlands	WTT	Clay	(Spain) Daniel Rincón	6–7^{(6–8)}, 6–4, 1–6
Win	5–8	Sep 2022	M25 Santa Margherita di Pula, Italy	WTT	Clay	(Italy) Edoardo Lavagno	6–4, 6–1
Loss	5–9	Jan 2024	M25 Mandya, India	WTT	Hard	(Israel) Orel Kimhi	2–6, 4–6
Loss	5–10	Feb 2024	M25 Vila Real de Santo António, Portugal	WTT	Hard	(Portugal) Jaime Faria	3–6, 0–6
Win	6–10	Apr 2024	M25 Santa Margherita di Pula, Italy	WTT	Clay	(Italy) Marcello Serafini	6–3, 6–2
Loss	6–11	May 2024	M25 Reggio Emilia, Italy	WTT	Clay	(Slovakia) Martin Kližan	4–6, 4–6
