= 2021 Sofia Open =

- Date: 27 September – 3 October
- Edition: 6th
- Category: ATP World Tour 250 series
- Draw: 28S / 16D
- Prize money: €419,470
- Surface: Hard (indoor)
- Location: Sofia, Bulgaria
- Venue: Arena Armeec

Champions

Singles
- (Italy) Jannik Sinner

Doubles
- (United Kingdom) Jonny O'Mara / (United Kingdom) Ken Skupski
- Sofia Open

The 2021 Sofia Open was a men's tennis tournament played on indoor hard courts. It was the sixth edition of the Sofia Open as part of the ATP World Tour 250 series of the 2021 ATP Tour. It was played at the Arena Armeec in Sofia, Bulgaria, from 27 September to 3 October 2021. First-seeded Jannik Sinner won the singles title.

== Finals ==
=== Singles ===
- (Italy) Jannik Sinner defeated (France) Gaël Monfils 6–3, 6–4

=== Doubles ===
- (United Kingdom) Jonny O'Mara / (United Kingdom) Ken Skupski defeated (Austria) Oliver Marach / (Austria) Philipp Oswald, 6–3, 6–4

== Singles main-draw entrants ==
=== Seeds ===
Country	Player	Rank^{1}	Seed
ITA	Jannik Sinner	14	1
FRA	Gaël Monfils	20	2
AUS	Alex de Minaur	21	3
~~KAZ~~	~~Alexander Bublik~~	~~34~~	~~4~~
SRB	Filip Krajinović	37	5
FRA	Adrian Mannarino	43	6
ESP	Alejandro Davidovich Fokina	45	7
AUS	John Millman	48	8

- ^{1} Rankings are as of 20 September 2021.

=== Other entrants ===
The following players received wildcards into the main draw:

- (Bulgaria) Adrian Andreev
- (Bulgaria) Dimitar Kuzmanov
- (Bulgaria) Alexandar Lazarov

The following players received entry from the qualifying draw:

- (Belarus) Egor Gerasimov
- (Ukraine) Illya Marchenko
- (Spain) Pedro Martínez
- (Italy) Andreas Seppi

The following player received entry as a lucky loser:

- (Poland) Kamil Majchrzak

=== Withdrawals ===
Before the tournament

- (Spain) Roberto Bautista Agut → replaced by (Australia) James Duckworth
- (Kazakhstan) Alexander Bublik → replaced by (Poland) Kamil Majchrzak
- (Croatia) Marin Čilić → replaced by (Italy) Gianluca Mager
- (United States) Mackenzie McDonald → replaced by (Finland) Emil Ruusuvuori

During the tournament

- (Belarus) Ilya Ivashka

== Doubles main-draw entrants ==
=== Seeds ===
Country	Player	Country	Player	Rank^{1}	Seed
FIN	Henri Kontinen	JPN	Ben McLachlan	81	1
BIH	Tomislav Brkić	SRB	Nikola Ćaćić	93	2
AUT	Oliver Marach	AUT	Philipp Oswald	95	3
AUS	Luke Saville	AUS	John-Patrick Smith	97	4

- ^{1} Rankings are as of 20 September 2021.

=== Other entrants ===
The following pairs received wildcards into the doubles main draw:

- (Bulgaria) Adrian Andreev / (Bulgaria) Alexandar Lazarov
- (Bulgaria) Alexander Donski / (Bulgaria) Dimitar Kuzmanov

The following pair received entry as alternates:

- (Bulgaria) Plamen Milushev / (Bulgaria) Radoslav Shandarov

=== Withdrawals ===
Before the tournament

- (France) Jérémy Chardy / (Monaco) Hugo Nys → replaced by (Sweden) André Göransson / (Monaco) Hugo Nys
- (Australia) Matthew Ebden / (Israel) Jonathan Erlich → replaced by (Israel) Jonathan Erlich / (United Kingdom) Dominic Inglot
- (Belgium) Sander Gillé / (Belgium) Joran Vliegen → replaced by (United Kingdom) Jonny O'Mara / (United Kingdom) Ken Skupski
- (United States) Marcos Giron / (United States) Mackenzie McDonald → replaced by (Italy) Lorenzo Musetti / (Italy) Andrea Vavassori
- (Spain) Pedro Martínez / (Spain) Jaume Munar → replaced by (Bulgaria) Plamen Milushev / (Bulgaria) Radoslav Shandarov
