= 2018 Diema Xtra Sofia Open =

- Date: 5–11 February
- Edition: 3rd
- Category: ATP World Tour 250 series
- Draw: 28S / 16D
- Prize money: €501,345
- Surface: Hard / indoor
- Location: Sofia, Bulgaria
- Venue: Arena Armeec

Champions

Singles
- (Bosnia and Herzegovina) Mirza Bašić

Doubles
- (Netherlands) Robin Haase / (Netherlands) Matwé Middelkoop
← 2017 ·	Sofia Open	· 2019 →

The 2018 Sofia Open (also known as 2018 DIEMA XTRA Sofia Open for sponsorship reasons) was a men's tennis tournament played on indoor hard courts. It was the third edition of the Sofia Open as part of the ATP World Tour 250 series of the 2018 ATP World Tour. It took place at the Arena Armeec in Sofia, Bulgaria, from 5 February until 11 February 2018. Unseeded Mirza Bašić, who entered the main draw as a qualifier, won the singles title.

== Finals ==
=== Singles ===
- (Bosnia and Herzegovina) Mirza Bašić defeated (Romania) Marius Copil, 7–6^{(8–6)}, 6–7^{(4–7)}, 6–4

=== Doubles ===
- (Netherlands) Robin Haase / (Netherlands) Matwé Middelkoop defeated (Croatia) Nikola Mektić / (Austria) Alexander Peya, 5–7, 6–4, [10–4]

== Points and prize money ==
=== Point distribution ===
Event	W	F	SF	QF	Round of 16	Round of 32	Q	Q2	Q1
Singles	250	150	90	45	20	0	12	6	0
Doubles	250	150	90	45	0	—	—	—	—

=== Prize money ===
Event	W	F	SF	QF	Round of 16	Round of 32	Q2	Q1
Singles	€85,945	€45,265	€24,520	€13,970	€8,230	€4,875	€2,195	€1,100
Doubles	€26,110	€13,730	€7,440	€4,260	€2,490	—	—	—
Doubles prize money per team

== Singles main-draw entrants ==
=== Seeds ===
Country	Player	Rank^{1}	Seed
SUI	Stan Wawrinka	15	1
FRA	Adrian Mannarino	25	2
LUX	Gilles Müller	28	3
GER	Philipp Kohlschreiber	36	4
NED	Robin Haase	42	5
SRB	Viktor Troicki	67	6
POR	João Sousa	68	7
RUS	Evgeny Donskoy	71	8

- ^{1} Rankings as of January 29, 2018

=== Other entrants ===
The following players received wildcards into the singles main draw:

- (Bulgaria) Adrian Andreev
- (Bulgaria) Alexander Donski
- (Bulgaria) Dimitar Kuzmanov

The following players received entry from the qualifying draw:

- (Bosnia and Herzegovina) Mirza Bašić
- (Latvia) Ernests Gulbis
- (Slovakia) Martin Kližan
- (Slovakia) Jozef Kovalík

The following players received entry as a lucky loser:

- (Italy) Salvatore Caruso
- (Germany) Florian Mayer

=== Withdrawals ===
Before the tournament

- (Bulgaria) Grigor Dimitrov (shoulder injury) →replaced by (Switzerland) Stan Wawrinka
- (Australia) Matthew Ebden →replaced by (Germany) Florian Mayer
- (South Korea) Chung Hyeon (blisters) →replaced by (Slovenia) Blaž Kavčič
- (Serbia) Filip Krajinović →replaced by (Cyprus) Marcos Baghdatis
- (Kazakhstan) Mikhail Kukushkin →replaced by (Italy) Salvatore Caruso
- (Chinese Taipei) Lu Yen-hsun →replaced by (Tunisia) Malek Jaziri

== Doubles main-draw entrants ==
=== Seeds ===
Country	Player	Country	Player	Rank^{1}	Seed
POL	Marcin Matkowski	PAK	Aisam-ul-Haq Qureshi	67	1
CRO	Nikola Mektić	AUT	Alexander Peya	80	2
USA	Nicholas Monroe	AUS	John-Patrick Smith	97	3
NED	Robin Haase	NED	Matwé Middelkoop	101	4

- ^{1} Rankings are as of January 29, 2018.

=== Other entrants ===
The following pairs received wildcards into the doubles main draw:

- (Bulgaria) Alexander Donski / (Bulgaria) Alexandar Lazov
- (Bulgaria) Dimitar Kuzmanov / (Bulgaria) Vasko Mladenov

The following pair received entry as alternates:

- (Bulgaria) Radoslav Shandarov / (Bulgaria) Vasil Shandarov

=== Withdrawals ===
Before the tournament

- (Kazakhstan) Mikhail Kukushkin
