= 2022 Internationaux de Tennis de Vendée – Singles =

Singles
- 2022 Internationaux de Tennis de Vendée

Final
- Champion: (Netherlands) Jelle Sels
- Runner-up: (Canada) Vasek Pospisil
- Score: 6–4, 6–3

Events
Singles	Doubles
- Internationaux de Tennis de Vendée

Jiří Veselý was the defending champion but chose not to defend his title.

Jelle Sels won the title after defeating Vasek Pospisil 6–4, 6–3 in the final.

== Seeds ==
1. (Czech Republic) Jiří Lehečka (second round, retired)
2. (United States) J. J. Wolf (quarterfinals)
3. (France) Hugo Gaston (semifinals)
4. (France) Richard Gasquet (first round)
5. (France) Quentin Halys (withdrew)
6. (France) Hugo Grenier (first round)
7. (Slovakia) Norbert Gombos (quarterfinals)
8. (Czech Republic) Tomáš Macháč (quarterfinals)

== Draw ==
Key

- Q = Qualifier
- WC = Wild card
- LL = Lucky loser
- Alt = Alternate
- ITF = ITF entry
- PR = Protected ranking
- SR = Special ranking
- SE = Special exempt
- JE = Junior exempt
- JR = Junior Accelerator Programme entrant
- CO = College Accelerator Programme entrant
- NG = Next Gen Accelerator Program entrant
- w/o = Walkover
- r = Retired
- d = Defaulted

=== Finals ===
Semifinals
(Netherlands) Jelle Sels	6	6
Q	(France) Jurgen Briand	2	3
3	(France) Hugo Gaston	3	6	3
WC	(Canada) Vasek Pospisil	6	3	6

Final
(Netherlands) Jelle Sels	6	6
WC	(Canada) Vasek Pospisil	4	3

=== Top half ===
First round
1	(Czech Republic) J Lehečka	7^{11}	6
(Netherlands) T van Rijthoven	6^{9}	4
(Netherlands) J Sels	5	6	6
Q	(Czech Republic) D Poljak	7	4	4
WC	(France) C Tabur	3	4
(Finland) O Virtanen	6	6
(France) G Simon	6^{5}	6^{r}
LL	(France) K de Schepper	7^{7}	6
4	(France) R Gasquet	2	5
Q	(France) Jurgen Briand	6	7
Q	(France) M Bourgue	6^{2}	6	6
(Switzerland) A Bellier	7^{7}	4	3
Alt	(France) A Cazaux	7^{7}	6
(Czech Republic) J Forejtek	6^{1}	4
A Vatutin	5	6	3
8	(Czech Republic) T Macháč	7	2	6

Second round
1	(Czech Republic) J Lehečka	6^{8}	2^{r}
(Netherlands) J Sels	7^{10}	4
(Finland) O Virtanen	6	6
LL	(France) K de Schepper	2	4
Q	(France) J Briand	5	6	6
Q	(France) M Bourgue	7	4	3
Alt	(France) A Cazaux	2	4
8	(Czech Republic) T Macháč	6	6

Quarterfinals
(Netherlands) J Sels	6	6
(Finland) O Virtanen	3	4
Q	(France) J Briand	6	1	6
8	(Czech Republic) T Macháč	3	6	3

Semifinals
(Netherlands) J Sels	6	6
Q	(France) J Briand	2	3

=== Bottom half ===
First round
7	(Slovakia) N Gombos	2	6	6
(France) A Escoffier	6	1	2
WC	(France) A Fils	5	5
Alt	(Ukraine) V Sachko	7	7
(France) E Furness	2	0^{r}
Q	(France) V Royer	6	1
(Switzerland) H Laaksonen	6^{6}	6	6^{7}
3	(France) H Gaston	7^{8}	4	7^{9}
6	(France) H Grenier	6^{3}	4
WC	(Canada) V Pospisil	7^{7}	6
(Italy) F Maestrelli	1	7^{8}	3
Q	(France) Jules Marie	6	6^{6}	6
(United States) J Sock	6	6
Q	(France) Alexis Gautier	3	3
(Germany) D Masur	3	5
2	(United States) JJ Wolf	6	7

Second round
7	(Slovakia) N Gombos	6	7
Alt	(Ukraine) V Sachko	4	5
Q	(France) V Royer	6^{5}	4
3	(France) H Gaston	7^{7}	6
WC	(Canada) V Pospisil	6	6
Q	(France) J Marie	3	3
(United States) J Sock	6^{1}	4
2	(United States) JJ Wolf	7^{7}	6

Quarterfinals
7	(Slovakia) N Gombos	4	4
3	(France) H Gaston	6	6
WC	(Canada) V Pospisil	4	6	7^{7}
2	(United States) JJ Wolf	6	3	6^{3}

Semifinals
3	(France) H Gaston	3	6	3
WC	(Canada) V Pospisil	6	3	6
