= 2022 Internationaux de Tennis de Vendée =

- Date: 3–9 October
- Edition: 9th
- Surface: Hard (Indoor)
- Location: Mouilleron-le-Captif, France

Champions

Singles
- (Netherlands) Jelle Sels

Doubles
- (Netherlands) Sander Arends / (Netherlands) David Pel
- Internationaux de Tennis de Vendée

The 2022 Internationaux de Tennis de Vendée was a professional tennis tournament played on hard courts. It was the ninth edition of the tournament which was part of the 2022 ATP Challenger Tour. It took place in Mouilleron-le-Captif, France between 3 and 9 October 2022.

== Singles main-draw entrants ==
=== Seeds ===
Country	Player	Rank^{1}	Seed
CZE	Jiří Lehečka	74	1
USA	J. J. Wolf	75	2
FRA	Hugo Gaston	81	3
FRA	Richard Gasquet	83	4
~~FRA~~	~~Quentin Halys~~	~~84~~	~~5~~
FRA	Hugo Grenier	97	6
SVK	Norbert Gombos	98	7
CZE	Tomáš Macháč	107	8

- ^{1} Rankings are as of 26 September 2022.

=== Other entrants ===
The following players received wildcards into the singles main draw:

- (France) Arthur Fils
- (Canada) Vasek Pospisil
- (France) Clément Tabur

The following players received entry into the singles main draw as alternates:

- (France) Arthur Cazaux
- (Ukraine) Vitaliy Sachko

The following players received entry from the qualifying draw:

- (France) Mathias Bourgue
- (France) Jurgen Briand
- (France) Alexis Gautier
- (France) Jules Marie
- (Czech Republic) David Poljak
- (France) Valentin Royer

The following player received entry as a lucky loser:

- (France) Kenny de Schepper

== Champions ==
=== Singles ===
- (Netherlands) Jelle Sels def. (Canada) Vasek Pospisil 6–4, 6–3.

=== Doubles ===
- (Netherlands) Sander Arends / (Netherlands) David Pel def. (India) Purav Raja / (India) Divij Sharan 6–7^{(1–7)}, 7–6^{(8–6)}, [10–6].
