= 2019 Sofia Open =

- Date: 4–10 February
- Edition: 4th
- Category: ATP Tour 250 series
- Draw: 28S / 16D
- Prize money: €524,340
- Surface: Hard / indoor
- Location: Sofia, Bulgaria
- Venue: Arena Armeec

Champions

Singles
- (Russia) Daniil Medvedev

Doubles
- (Croatia) Nikola Mektić / (Austria) Jürgen Melzer
← 2018 ·	Sofia Open	· 2020 →

The 2019 Sofia Open was a men's tennis tournament to be played on indoor hard courts. It was the fourth edition of the Sofia Open as part of the ATP Tour 250 series of the 2019 ATP Tour. It took place at the Arena Armeec in Sofia, Bulgaria, from 5 February until 11 February 2019. Third-seeded Daniil Medvedev won the singles title.

== Finals ==
=== Singles ===
- (Russia) Daniil Medvedev defeated (Hungary) Márton Fucsovics, 6–4, 6–3

=== Doubles ===
- (Croatia) Nikola Mektić / (Austria) Jürgen Melzer defeated (Chinese Taipei) Hsieh Cheng-peng / (Indonesia) Christopher Rungkat, 6–2, 4–6, [10–2]

== Singles main-draw entrants ==
=== Seeds ===
Country	Player	Rank^{1}	Seed
RUS	Karen Khachanov	11	1
GRE	Stefanos Tsitsipas	12	2
RUS	Daniil Medvedev	16	3
ESP	Roberto Bautista Agut	18	4
GEO	Nikoloz Basilashvili	22	5
ESP	Fernando Verdasco	26	6
FRA	Gaël Monfils	33	7
ITA	Andreas Seppi	37	8

- ^{1} Rankings as of January 28, 2019

=== Other entrants ===
The following players received wildcards into the singles main draw:

- (Bulgaria) Adrian Andreev
- (Bulgaria) Dimitar Kuzmanov
- (Serbia) Viktor Troicki

The following players received entry from the qualifying draw:

- (Germany) Daniel Brands
- (Bulgaria) Alexandar Lazarov
- (Germany) Yannick Maden
- (Italy) Stefano Travaglia

=== Withdrawals ===
During the tournament

- (Spain) Roberto Bautista Agut

== Doubles main-draw entrants ==
=== Seeds ===
Country	Player	Country	Player	Rank^{1}	Seed
NED	Jean-Julien Rojer	ROU	Horia Tecău	49	1
GBR	Dominic Inglot	CRO	Franko Škugor	50	2
IND	Rohan Bopanna	IND	Divij Sharan	77	3
NED	Robin Haase	NED	Matwé Middelkoop	77	4

- ^{1} Rankings are as of January 28, 2019.

=== Other entrants ===
The following pairs received wildcards into the doubles main draw:

- (Bulgaria) Adrian Andreev / (Bulgaria) Dimitar Kuzmanov
- (Bulgaria) Alexander Donski / (Bulgaria) Alexandar Lazarov

=== Withdrawals ===
Before the tournament

- (Georgia (country)) Nikoloz Basilashvili
