= 2021 Sofia Open – Singles =

Singles
- 2021 Sofia Open

Final
- Champion: (Italy) Jannik Sinner
- Runner-up: (France) Gaël Monfils
- Score: 6–3, 6–4

Details
- Draw: 28 (4 Q / 3 WC )
- Seeds: 8

Events
Singles	Doubles
- ATP Sofia Open

Jannik Sinner was the reigning champion and successfully defended his title, defeating Gaël Monfils in the final, 6–3, 6–4.

== Seeds ==
The top four seeds received a bye into the second round.

1. (Italy) Jannik Sinner (champion)
2. (France) Gaël Monfils (final)
3. (Australia) Alex de Minaur (second round)
4. (Kazakhstan) Alexander Bublik (withdrew)
5. (Serbia) Filip Krajinović (semifinals)
6. (France) Adrian Mannarino (first round)
7. (Spain) Alejandro Davidovich Fokina (first round)
8. (Australia) John Millman (quarterfinals)

== Draw ==
Key

- Q = Qualifier
- WC = Wild card
- LL = Lucky loser
- Alt = Alternate
- ITF = ITF entry
- PR = Protected ranking
- SR = Special ranking
- SE = Special exempt
- JE = Junior exempt
- JR = Junior Accelerator Programme entrant
- CO = College Accelerator Programme entrant
- NG = Next Gen Accelerator Program entrant
- w/o = Walkover
- r = Retired
- d = Defaulted

=== Finals ===
Semifinals
1	(Italy) Jannik Sinner	6	7
5	(Serbia) Filip Krajinović	3	5
(United States) Marcos Giron	5	0
2	(France) Gaël Monfils	7	6

Final
1	(Italy) Jannik Sinner	6	6
2	(France) Gaël Monfils	3	4

=== Top half ===
First round
Q	(Belarus) E Gerasimov	5	7^{10}	6
(Canada) V Pospisil	7	6^{8}	3
(Finland) E Ruusuvuori	6	4	4
(Australia) J Duckworth	3	6	6
(France) B Paire	6	7
7	(Spain) A Davidovich Fokina	4	5
WC	(Bulgaria) D Kuzmanov	6^{4}	7^{7}	6
(Italy) L Musetti	7^{7}	6^{3}	3
Q	(Spain) P Martínez	6^{5}	3
(Serbia) L Đere	7^{7}	6
WC	(Bulgaria) A Lazarov	0	3
5	(Serbia) F Krajinović	6	6

Second round
1	(Italy) J Sinner	6	7^{7}
Q	(Belarus) E Gerasimov	2	6^{3}
(Australia) J Duckworth	6	6
(France) B Paire	4	4
LL	(Poland) K Majchrzak	7	6
WC	(Bulgaria) D Kuzmanov	5	1
(Serbia) L Đere	3	0
5	(Serbia) F Krajinović	6	6

Quarterfinals
1	(Italy) J Sinner	7^{7}	6
(Australia) J Duckworth	6^{4}	4
LL	(Poland) K Majchrzak	3	6	3
5	(Serbia) F Krajinović	6	4	6

Semifinals
1	(Italy) J Sinner	6	7
5	(Serbia) F Krajinović	3	5

=== Bottom half ===
First round
8	(Australia) J Millman	6	6
(Sweden) M Ymer	2	4
Q	(Italy) A Seppi	4	2
Q	(Ukraine) I Marchenko	6	6
(Spain) J Munar	7^{7}	1	4
(United States) M Giron	6^{2}	6	6
6	(France) A Mannarino	3	2
(Italy) G Mager	6	6
(Serbia) M Kecmanović	7^{9}	6
WC	(Bulgaria) A Andreev	6^{7}	4
(Belarus) I Ivashka	6	6
(Spain) P Andújar	4	3

Second round
8	(Australia) J Millman	5	7^{7}	6
Q	(Ukraine) I Marchenko	7	6^{0}	3
(United States) M Giron	7^{7}	7^{7}
3	(Australia) A de Minaur	6^{5}	6^{2}
(Italy) G Mager	7^{7}	6
(Serbia) M Kecmanović	6^{3}	3
(Belarus) I Ivashka
2	(France) G Monfils	w/o

Quarterfinals
8	(Australia) J Millman	4	2
(United States) M Giron	6	6
(Italy) G Mager	2	2
2	(France) G Monfils	6	6

Semifinals
(United States) M Giron	5	0
2	(France) G Monfils	7	6

== Qualifying ==
=== Seeds ===
1. (Spain) Pedro Martínez (qualified)
2. (Italy) Marco Cecchinato (first round)
3. (Italy) Andreas Seppi (qualified)
4. (Belarus) Egor Gerasimov (qualified)
5. (Colombia) Daniel Elahi Galán (first round)
6. (Poland) Kamil Majchrzak (qualifying competition, lucky loser)
7. (Czech Republic) Tomáš Macháč (qualifying competition)
8. (Austria) Jurij Rodionov (first round)

=== Qualifiers ===
1. (Spain) Pedro Martínez
2. (Ukraine) Illya Marchenko
3. (Italy) Andreas Seppi
4. (Belarus) Egor Gerasimov

=== Lucky loser ===
1. (Poland) Kamil Majchrzak

=== Qualifying draw ===
==== First qualifier ====
First round
1	(Spain) Pedro Martínez	7	6
WC	(Bulgaria) Simon Anthony Ivanov	5	1
(United States) Maxime Cressy	6	4	3
6	(Poland) Kamil Majchrzak	4	6	6

Qualifying competition
1	(Spain) Pedro Martínez	6	7^{7}
6	(Poland) Kamil Majchrzak	4	6^{4}

==== Second qualifier ====
First round
2	(Italy) Marco Cecchinato	3	3
(Ukraine) Illya Marchenko	6	6
(Poland) Kacper Żuk	4	2
7	(Czech Republic) Tomáš Macháč	6	6

Qualifying competition
(Ukraine) Illya Marchenko	3	6	7^{7}
7	(Czech Republic) Tomáš Macháč	6	3	6^{2}

==== Third qualifier ====
First round
3	(Italy) Andreas Seppi	7^{7}	6
(Turkey) Cem İlkel	6^{3}	2
WC	(Bulgaria) Alexander Donski	2	6	7^{7}
8	(Austria) Jurij Rodionov	6	1	6^{4}

Qualifying competition
3	(Italy) Andreas Seppi	6	6
WC	(Bulgaria) Alexander Donski	3	2

==== Fourth qualifier ====
First round
4	(Belarus) Egor Gerasimov	6	7^{7}
(Russia) Evgeny Donskoy	3	6^{4}
(Turkey) Altuğ Çelikbilek	7^{8}	4	7
5	(Colombia) Daniel Elahi Galán	6^{6}	6	5

Qualifying competition
4	(Belarus) Egor Gerasimov	7^{8}	6
(Turkey) Altuğ Çelikbilek	6^{6}	3
