= Vasil Shandarov =

Bulgarian tennis player

- Country (sports): Bulgaria
- Born: 14 July 1991 (age 34)
- Prize money: $3,964

Singles
- Career record: 0–0 (at ATP Tour level, Grand Slam level, and in Davis Cup)
- Career titles: 0 ITF
- Highest ranking: No. 1603 (22 June 2015)

Doubles
- Career record: 0–1 (at ATP Tour level, Grand Slam level, and in Davis Cup)
- Career titles: 0
- Highest ranking: No. 1445 (11 December 2017)
- Current ranking: No. 1510 (28 May 2018)
- Last updated on: 08 June 2018.

Vasil Shandarov (Bulgarian: Васил Шандаров) (born 14 July 1991) is a Bulgarian tennis player.

Shandarov has a career high ATP singles ranking of 1603 achieved on 22 June 2015. He also has a career high ATP doubles ranking of 1445 achieved on 11 December 2017.

Shandarov made his ATP main draw debut at the 2018 Sofia Open as an alternate in the doubles main draw partnering with his brother Radoslav Shandarov. Together with his brother he has been representing Vector Tennis Sport from Sofia.
