= 2019 Sofia Open – Singles =

Singles
- 2019 Sofia Open

Final
- Champion: (Russia) Daniil Medvedev
- Runner-up: (Hungary) Márton Fucsovics
- Score: 6–4, 6–3

Details
- Draw: 28 (4 Q / 3 WC )
- Seeds: 8

Events
Singles	Doubles
- ATP Sofia Open

Mirza Bašić was the defending champion but lost in the first round to Martin Kližan.

Daniil Medvedev won the title, defeating Márton Fucsovics in the final, 6–4, 6–3.

== Seeds ==
The top four seeds received a bye into the second round.

1. (Russia) Karen Khachanov (second round)
2. (Greece) Stefanos Tsitsipas (quarterfinals)
3. (Russia) Daniil Medvedev (champion)
4. (Spain) Roberto Bautista Agut (quarterfinals, withdrew)
5. (Georgia (country)) Nikoloz Basilashvili (first round)
6. (Spain) Fernando Verdasco (quarterfinals)
7. (France) Gaël Monfils (semifinals)
8. (Italy) Andreas Seppi (first round)

== Draw ==
Key

- Q = Qualifier
- WC = Wild card
- LL = Lucky loser
- Alt = Alternate
- ITF = ITF entry
- PR = Protected ranking
- SR = Special ranking
- SE = Special exempt
- JE = Junior exempt
- JR = Junior Accelerator Programme entrant
- CO = College Accelerator Programme entrant
- NG = Next Gen Accelerator Program entrant
- w/o = Walkover
- r = Retired
- d = Defaulted

=== Finals ===
Semifinals
(Italy) Matteo Berrettini	7	5	3
(Hungary) Márton Fucsovics	5	7	6
3	(Russia) Daniil Medvedev	6	6
7	(France) Gaël Monfils	2	4

Final
(Hungary) Márton Fucsovics	4	3
3	(Russia) Daniil Medvedev	6	6

=== Top half ===
First round
(Uzbekistan) D Istomin	4	6^{7}
(Italy) M Berrettini	6	7^{9}
(Romania) M Copil	3	7^{7}	6
(Switzerland) S Wawrinka	6	6^{5}	4
Q	(Bulgaria) A Lazarov	2	1
6	(Spain) F Verdasco	6	6
WC	(Bulgaria) A Andreev	3	6	6^{5}
(Australia) M Ebden	6	4	7^{7}
Q	(Germany) Y Maden	6	7^{7}
(France) A Mannarino	4	6^{4}
(Hungary) M Fucsovics	6	7^{7}
8	(Italy) A Seppi	2	6^{2}

Second round
1	(Russia) K Khachanov	7^{8}	3	4
(Italy) M Berrettini	6^{6}	6	6
(Romania) M Copil	2	6	1
6	(Spain) F Verdasco	6	4	6
4	(Spain) R Bautista Agut	3	6	6
(Australia) M Ebden	6	3	2
Q	(Germany) Y Maden	6^{3}	6	4
(Hungary) M Fucsovics	7^{7}	3	6

Quarterfinals
(Italy) M Berrettini	4	7	6
6	(Spain) F Verdasco	6	5	4
4	(Spain) R Bautista Agut
(Hungary) M Fucsovics	w/o

Semifinals
(Italy) M Berrettini	7	5	3
(Hungary) M Fucsovics	5	7	6

=== Bottom half ===
First round
5	(Georgia (country)) N Basilashvili	6^{7}	5
Q	(Germany) D Brands	7^{9}	7
(Bosnia and Herzegovina) M Bašić	0	6	2
(Slovakia) M Kližan	6	3	6
(Netherlands) R Haase	6	6
WC	(Bulgaria) D Kuzmanov	2	4
7	(France) G Monfils	6	6
WC	(Serbia) V Troicki	3	4
(Serbia) L Đere	6^{6}	4
(Kazakhstan) M Kukushkin	7^{8}	6
(Germany) J-L Struff	6	6
Q	(Italy) S Travaglia	4	3

Second round
Q	(Germany) D Brands	6^{5}	4
(Slovakia) M Kližan	7^{7}	6
(Netherlands) R Haase	7	2	2
3	(Russia) D Medvedev	5	6	6
7	(France) G Monfils	7	6
(Kazakhstan) M Kukushkin	5	3
(Germany) J-L Struff	6^{5}	4
2	(Greece) S Tsitsipas	7^{7}	6

Quarterfinals
(Slovakia) M Kližan	4	1
3	(Russia) D Medvedev	6	6
7	(France) G Monfils	6	7^{7}
2	(Greece) S Tsitsipas	3	6^{5}

Semifinals
3	(Russia) D Medvedev	6	6
7	(France) G Monfils	2	4

== Qualifying ==
=== Seeds ===
1. (Germany) Yannick Maden (qualified)
2. (Italy) Stefano Travaglia (qualified)
3. (Slovakia) Lukáš Lacko (first round)
4. (Ukraine) Sergiy Stakhovsky (qualifying competition)
5. (Italy) Luca Vanni (qualifying competition)
6. (Poland) Kamil Majchrzak (first round)
7. (Belarus) Egor Gerasimov (qualifying competition)
8. (Italy) Salvatore Caruso (first round)

=== Qualifiers ===
1. (Germany) Yannick Maden
2. (Italy) Stefano Travaglia
3. (Bulgaria) Alexandar Lazarov
4. (Germany) Daniel Brands

=== Qualifying draw ===
==== First qualifier ====
First round
1	(Germany) Yannick Maden	7	6
(Spain) Daniel Gimeno Traver	5	1
Alt	(Croatia) Franko Škugor	7^{7}	4	6
8	(Italy) Salvatore Caruso	6^{3}	6	3

Qualifying competition
1	(Germany) Yannick Maden	6	4	7^{7}
Alt	(Croatia) Franko Škugor	3	6	6^{5}

==== Second qualifier ====
First round
2	(Italy) Stefano Travaglia	3	6	7^{7}
(United Kingdom) James Ward	6	4	6^{4}
(Italy) Andrea Arnaboldi	3	6^{3}
7	(Belarus) Egor Gerasimov	6	7^{7}

Qualifying competition
2	(Italy) Stefano Travaglia	6	4	6
7	(Belarus) Egor Gerasimov	4	6	4

==== Third qualifier ====
First round
3	(Slovakia) Lukáš Lacko	6^{5}	2
WC	(Bulgaria) Alexandar Lazarov	7^{7}	6
(Germany) Rudolf Molleker	2	7^{7}	5
5	(Italy) Luca Vanni	6	6^{0}	7

Qualifying competition
WC	(Bulgaria) Alexandar Lazarov	7^{8}	3	7
5	(Italy) Luca Vanni	6^{6}	6	5

==== Fourth qualifier ====
First round
4	(Ukraine) Sergiy Stakhovsky	6	6
WC	(Bulgaria) Gabriel Donev	1	2
(Germany) Daniel Brands	6	7
6	(Poland) Kamil Majchrzak	4	5

Qualifying competition
4	(Ukraine) Sergiy Stakhovsky	4	6^{9}
(Germany) Daniel Brands	6	7^{11}
