= Plamen Milushev =

Bulgarian tennis player

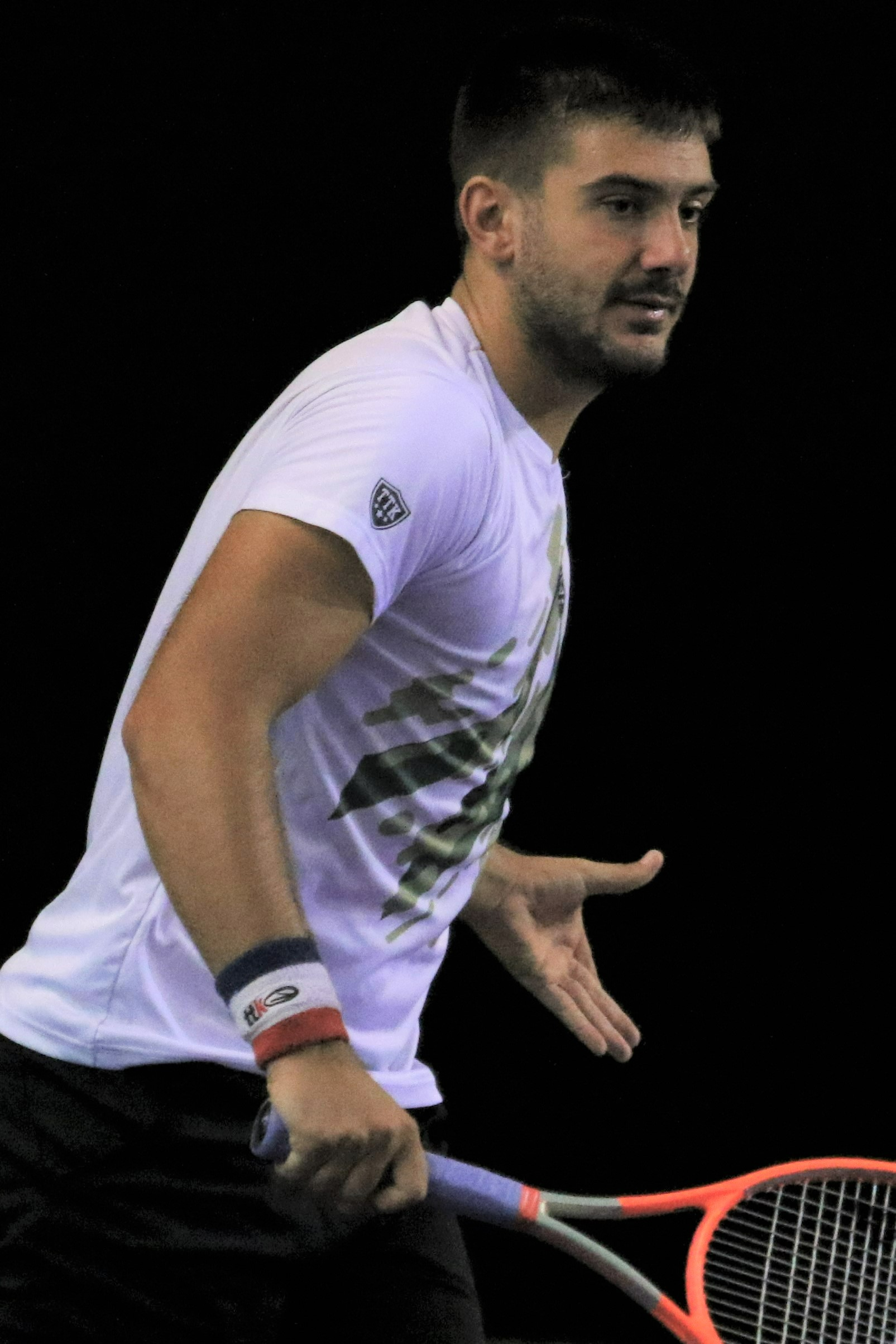
- Country (sports): Bulgaria
- Residence: Sofia, Bulgaria
- Born: 28 July 1993 (age 32); Sofia, Bulgaria
- Height: 1.85 m (6 ft 1 in)
- Turned pro: 2012
- Plays: Right-handed (two-handed backhand)
- Prize money: US$ 13,117

Singles
- Career record: 0–0 (at ATP Tour level, Grand Slam level, and in Davis Cup)
- Career titles: 0; 0 Challengers, 0 Futures
- Highest ranking: No. 955 (8 December 2014)

Doubles
- Career record: 0–1 (at ATP Tour level, Grand Slam level, and in Davis Cup)
- Career titles: 0; 0 Challengers, 1 Futures
- Highest ranking: No. 966 (17 December 2018)
- Current ranking: No. 1999 (23 December 2024)
- Last updated on: 23 December 2024.

Plamen Milushev (Bulgarian: Пламен Милушев, (born 6 August 1994) is a Bulgarian professional tennis player.

Milushev has a career high ATP singles ranking of No. 955 achieved on 8 December 2014, whilst his best doubles ranking is No. 966 achieved on 17 December 2018.

Milushev made his ATP main draw debut at the 2021 Sofia Open after entering the doubles main draw as an alternate with Radoslav Shandarov.

== Year-end ATP ranking ==
Year	2013	2014	2015	2016	2017	2018	2019	2020	2021	2022	2023	2024
Singles	1790	962	1380	-	-	-	1581	1640	2062	-	1751	-
Doubles	-	1017	1402	-	-	-	-	-	1236	1912	1723	1999

== Challenger and Futures/World Tennis Tour Finals ==
=== Doubles: 5 (1–4) ===
Legend (doubles) ATP Challenger Tour (0–0) ITF Futures/World Tennis Tour (1–4)	Titles by surface Hard (0–0) Clay (1–4) Grass (0–0) Carpet (0–0)

Result	W–L	Date	Tournament	Tier	Surface	Partner	Opponents	Score
Win	1–0	Jun 2014	Bulgaria F1, Burgas	Futures	Clay	(Bulgaria) Tihomir Grozdanov	(Italy) Riccardo Bonadio (Italy) Davide Melchiorre	6–2, 6–1
Loss	1–1	Aug 2014	Serbia F11, Zlatibor	Futures	Clay	(Bulgaria) Dinko Halachev	(Serbia) Danilo Petrović (Serbia) Ilija Vučić	6–2, 3–6, [7–10]
Loss	1–2	Aug 2018	Serbia F2, Novi Sad	Futures	Clay	(Bulgaria) Gabriel Donev	(Tunisia) Moez Echargui (Hungary) Péter Nagy	7–5, 4–6, [6–10]
Loss	1–3	Jan 2021	M15 Antalya, Turkey	World Tennis Tour	Clay	(Bulgaria) Simeon Terziev	(United Kingdom) Billy Harris (Russia) Yan Sabanin	6–7^{(5–7)}, 0–6
Loss	1–4	Aug 2025	M15 Sofia, Bulgaria	World Tennis Tour	Clay	(Bulgaria) Viktor Markov	(Italy) Jacopo Bilardo (Italy) Niccolò Ciavarella	4–6, 4–6
