= Radoslav Shandarov =

Bulgarian tennis player

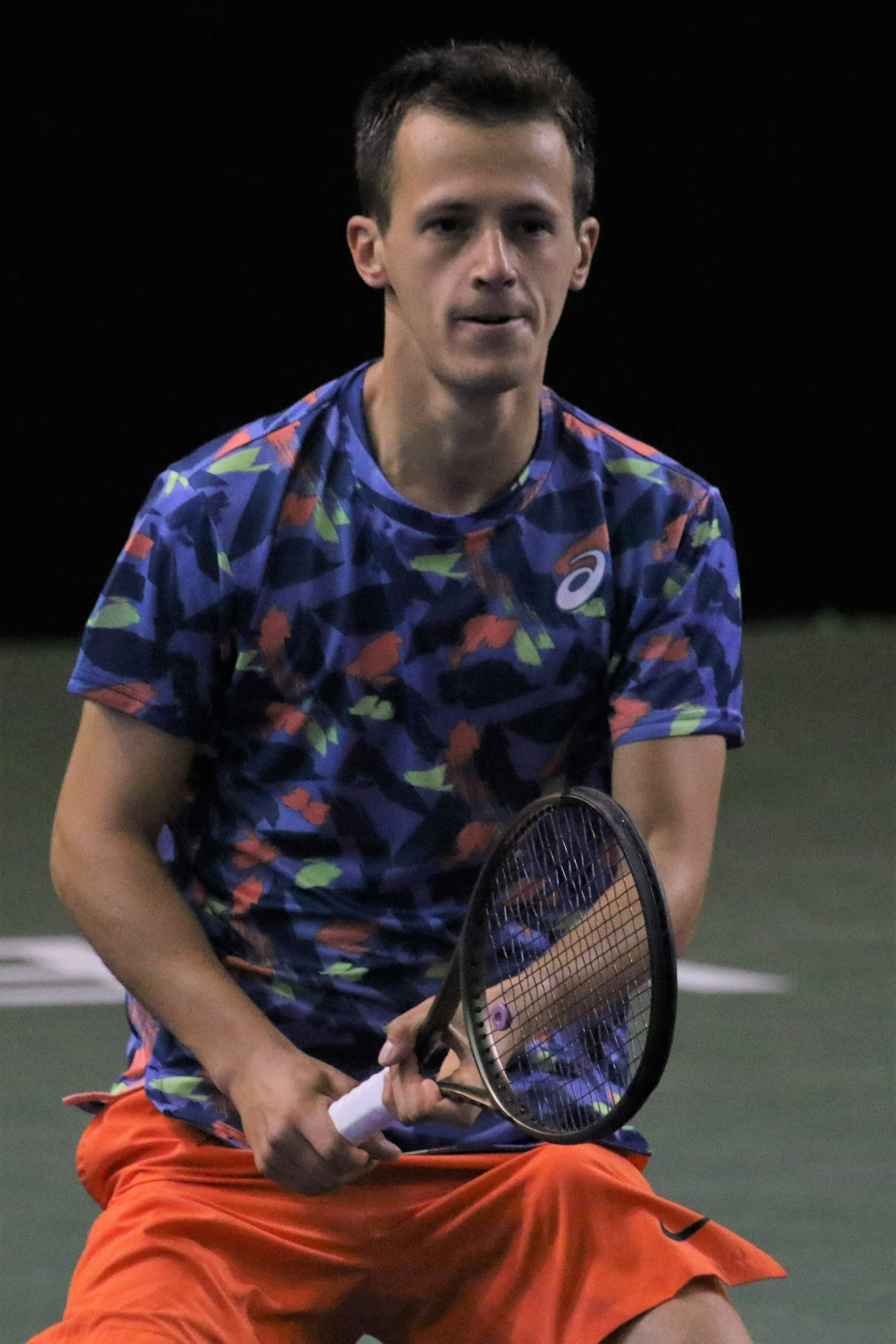
- Country (sports): Bulgaria
- Born: 11 July 1996 (age 29) Sofia, Bulgaria
- Height: 1.85 m (6 ft 1 in)
- Turned pro: 2013
- Plays: Right-handed (two-handed backhand)
- Prize money: US$ 2,726

Singles
- Career record: 0–0 (at ATP Tour level, Grand Slam level, and in Davis Cup)
- Career titles: 0; 0 Challengers, 0 Futures

Doubles
- Career record: 0–2 (at ATP Tour level, Grand Slam level, and in Davis Cup)
- Career titles: 0; 0 Challengers, 0 Futures
- Highest ranking: No. 1445 (11 December 2017)
- Current ranking: No. 1816 (18 January 2021)
- Last updated on: 23 January 2021.

Radoslav Shandarov (Bulgarian: Радослав Шандаров) (born 11 July 1996) is a Bulgarian tennis player.

Shandarov has a career high ATP doubles ranking of 1445 achieved on 11 December 2017.

Shandarov made his ATP main draw debut at the 2018 Sofia Open as an alternate in the doubles main draw partnering with his brother Vasil Shandarov. He also entered as an alternate in doubles at the 2021 Sofia Open partnering Plamen Milushev. Together with his brother he has been representing Vector Tennis Sport from Sofia.
