= Alex de Minaur =

Australian tennis player (born 1999)

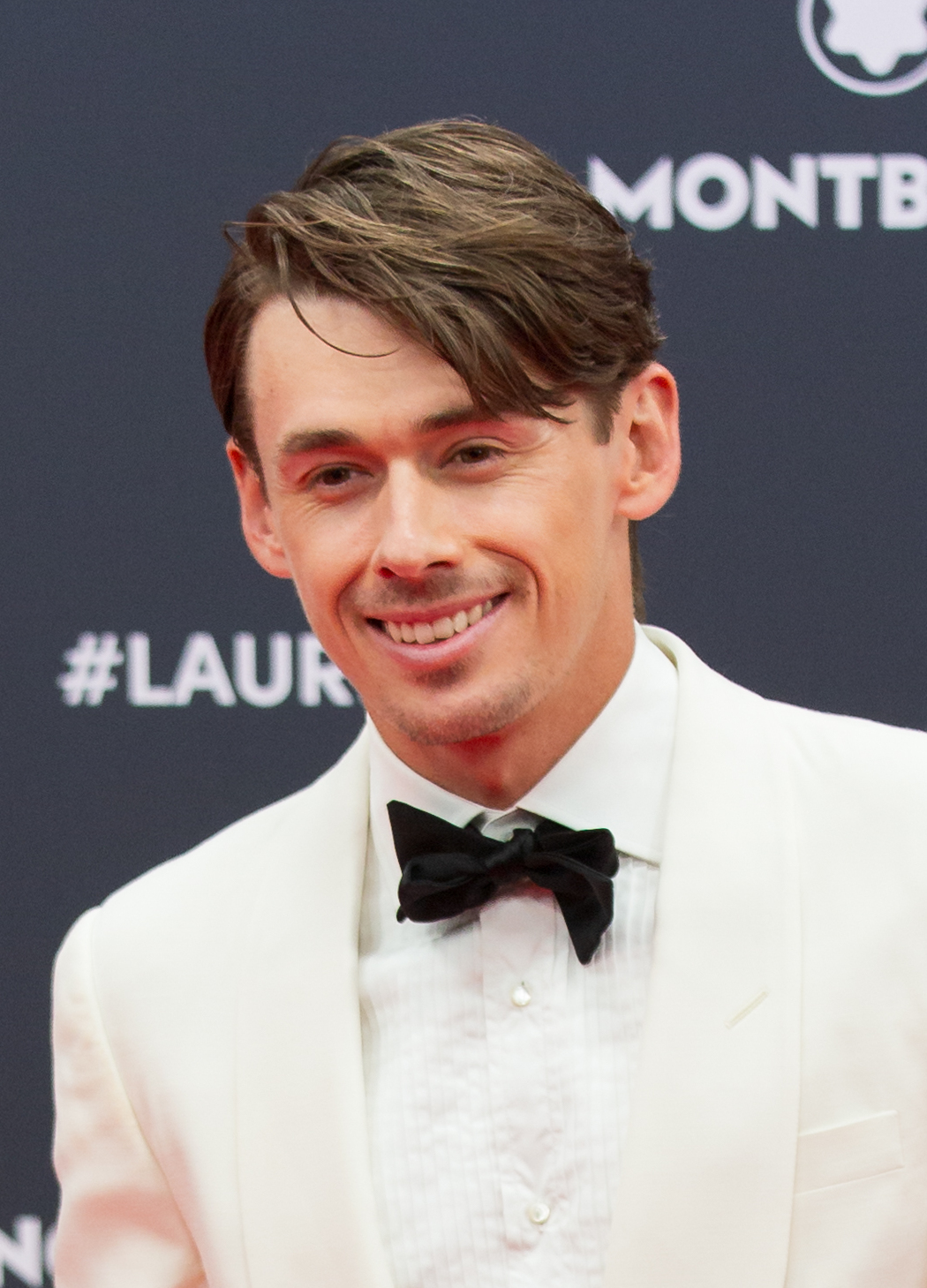
- De Minaur in 2024
- Full name: Álex de Miñaur Román
- Country (sports): Australia
- Residence: London, England, UK
- Born: 17 February 1999 (age 27) Sydney, New South Wales, Australia
- Height: 6 ft 0 in (183 cm)
- Turned pro: 2015
- Plays: Right-handed (two-handed backhand)
- Coach: Adolfo Gutiérrez; Peter Luczak; Matt Reid
- Prize money: US $28,043,960: 21th all-time in earnings

Singles
- Career record: 351–200
- Career titles: 11
- Highest ranking: No. 5 (13 July 2026)
- Current ranking: No. 11 (16 November 2026)

Grand Slam singles results
- Australian Open: QF (2025, 2026)
- French Open: QF (2024)
- Wimbledon: QF (2024)
- US Open: QF (2020, 2024, 2025)

Other tournaments
- Tour Finals: SF (2025)

Doubles
- Career record: 37–65
- Career titles: 1
- Highest ranking: No. 58 (12 October 2020)

Grand Slam doubles results
- Australian Open: 1R (2017, 2021)
- French Open: 2R (2020, 2021)
- Wimbledon: 2R (2021)
- US Open: 2R (2019)

Other doubles tournaments
- Olympic Games: 1R (2024)

Grand Slam mixed doubles results
- Wimbledon: 2R (2023)

Team competitions
- Davis Cup: F (2022, 2023); Record: 15–8
- Last updated on: 16 November 2026.

Alex de Miñaur Román (Note: English: /də mɪˈnɔːr/ də min-OR; Spanish: Álex de Miñaur Román, pronounced [ˈaleɣs ðe miˈɲawɾ roˈman]; in isolation, Álex and de are pronounced [ˈaleks] and [de] respectively.) (born 17 February 1999) is an Australian professional tennis player. He has a career-high ATP singles ranking of world No. 5 achieved on 13 July 2026 and a doubles ranking of No. 58 achieved on 12 October 2020. He is the current No. 1 Australian singles player.

De Minaur has won eleven ATP Tour titles in singles and one in doubles. He has reached seven major quarterfinals. He represents Australia at the Davis Cup.

== Early life and junior career ==
Alex de Miñaur was born in Sydney, Australia. His father Anibal, is Uruguayan and his mother, Esther, is Spanish. His father owned an Italian restaurant on George Street in Sydney and met Esther when she began working there as a waitress. De Minaur has two brothers and three sisters—Dominic, Daniel, Natalie, Cristina and Sara.

His name—commonly pronounced /diː mɪˈnɔːr/ by Australians and other native English-speakers—inspired his nickname of "The Demon", as well as his use of the demon logo when signing the camera lens after winning matches, his signature celebration.

De Minaur has dual Australian and Spanish citizenship, and is fluent in English and Spanish and also speaks some French. He spent the first five years of his life in the south Sydney suburb of Carss Park before relocating to Alicante, Spain. He completed most of his early education in Spain before returning to Australia in 2012 at age 13 due to the Spanish financial crisis. As of 2015, De Minaur was again living in Spain. De Minaur has stated that he has always felt a strong bond with Australia even though he has lived most of his life in Spain. In 2017, he told the Sydney Morning Herald, "I used to represent Spain but I always felt I was Australian. As soon as we moved back here again that was the first thing I wanted to do—play for Australia."

De Minaur began playing tennis at age three at the Sydney Private Tennis Academy at the Parkside Tennis Courts in Kogarah Bay. He has been coached by Adolfo Gutierrez since he was nine years old and living in Alicante. De Minaur reached a career-high ranking of 2 on the juniors circuit and won the 2016 Australian Open boys' doubles title alongside Blake Ellis. Although Lleyton Hewitt has never officially been his coach, he continues to be a mentor.

== Professional career ==
=== 2015–2017: Early career and turning pro ===
De Minaur plays tennis under the flag of Australia. He made his professional debut in July 2015 at the Spain F22, reaching the quarterfinals. He was given a wildcard into the qualifying rounds of the 2016 Australian Open but lost in round one to Kimmer Coppejans. De Minaur then spent the majority of the 2016 season playing on the ITF circuit in Spain, reaching two finals. He made his first ATP Challenger Tour final in Eckental, Germany after qualifying, however lost to Steve Darcis in the final.

De Minaur commenced 2017 at the Brisbane International, where he defeated Mikhail Kukushkin and Frances Tiafoe in qualifying to reach his first ATP Tour main draw. He lost in the first round to Mischa Zverev. The following week, he received a wildcard into the Sydney International where he defeated world No. 46, Benoît Paire to claim his first Tour-level win.

De Minaur made his Grand Slam debut at the 2017 Australian Open after receiving a wildcard. He faced Gerald Melzer in the first round and won in five sets, after saving a match point in the fourth set. He lost to Sam Querrey in round two.

In May, de Minaur made his French Open debut, after being awarded a wildcard. He lost the opening round to Robin Haase, in straight sets. In June, De Minaur lost in the first round of Nottingham and Ilkley Challengers and the second round of Wimbledon qualifying.

De Minaur was awarded a wildcard into the 2017 US Open, losing in round one to Dominic Thiem.

In December, De Minaur won the Australian Open Playoff for a main draw wildcard into the 2018 Australian Open. He finished the year with a singles ranking of No. 208.

=== 2018: Two ATP finals, NextGen runner-up ===
De Minaur commenced the year at the Brisbane International after receiving a wildcard into the main draw. He defeated American Steve Johnson in straight sets, before scoring a career high win against world No. 24, Milos Raonic, in straight sets. He then defeated qualifier Michael Mmoh in the quarterfinals, before losing to Ryan Harrison in the semifinals. De Minaur is the lowest ranked player and the youngest to reach the semifinals of the men's draw in the Brisbane International's 10-year history.

De Minaur received a special exempt spot in the main draw of the Sydney event, where he consecutively eliminated Fernando Verdasco, Damir Džumhur and Feliciano López to reach his second ATP Tour semifinal; he reached this milestone just one week after having played in his first tour semifinal in Brisbane. De Minaur became the youngest player to play in two consecutive ATP Tour semifinals since Rafael Nadal in 2005. He beat Frenchman Benoît Paire in the semifinals to meet Daniil Medvedev in the final. De Minaur lost the final in three sets, having won the opener.

At the 2018 Australian Open, De Minaur lost in the first round to Tomáš Berdych but took a set off of the 19th seed.

He was awarded a wildcard into the 2018 French Open, but lost in the first round to British 16th seed Kyle Edmund. Following this, he made two consecutive Challenger finals, losing to Jérémy Chardy at Surbiton, before defeating Dan Evans in straight sets to claim his first Challenger-level title at the Nottingham Open.

He saw his best major results at-the-time during Wimbledon, defeating 29th seed and French Open semifinalist Marco Cecchinato and Pierre-Hugues Herbert to reach the third round, where he fell to world No.1 and second seed Rafael Nadal.

In Washington, de Minaur defeated Vasek Pospisil, 11th seed Steve Johnson, eighth seed and Australian Open semifinalist Chung Hyeon and received a walkover over Andy Murray to reach the semifinals where he faced Andrey Rublev. De Minaur saved four match points while down 2–6 in the second set tiebreak, winning six points in a row to win it 8–6. He then won the final set 6–4 to reach his first ATP 500 final against Alexander Zverev, in which he went down 4–6, 2–6. De Minaur entered the top 50 in the rankings for the first time at World No. 45 on 6 August 2018.

At the US Open, de Minaur defeated Taro Daniel and Frances Tiafoe before losing to seventh seed Marin Čilić in five sets. Later in the year, he replaced Nick Kyrgios as Australia's highest ranked male singles player.

De Minaur qualified as the second seed into the 2018 Next Generation ATP Finals. He beat Andrey Rublev, Taylor Fritz, Liam Caruana in group stage. He then defeated Jaume Munar in the semifinals, before losing to top seed Stefanos Tsitsipas.

=== 2019: Three ATP titles, top 20 ===
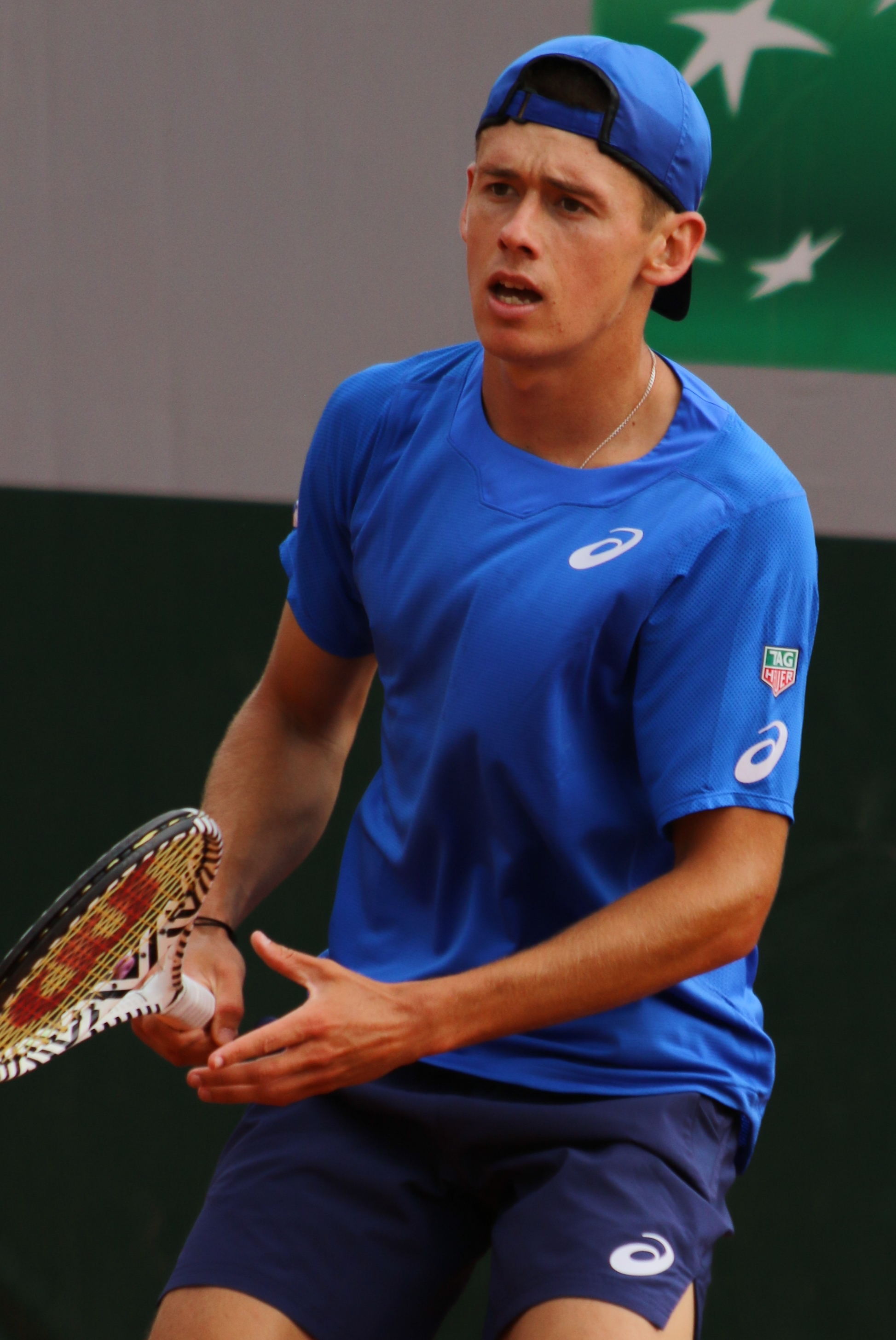
De Minaur at the 2019 French Open

De Minaur began his year with a quarterfinal run in Brisbane, competing at a career-high of world No. 31 and resulting in him being seeded for a Grand Slam tournament for the first time in his career at the upcoming Australian Open. At the Sydney International, straight-set victories over Dušan Lajović, Reilly Opelka, Jordan Thompson and Gilles Simon saw him return to the finals. He defeated Andreas Seppi (7–5, 7–6^{(5)}) to claim his first career title.

Seeded No. 27 at the 2019 Australian Open, he lost in the third round to Rafael Nadal. De Minaur reached a then career-high ranking of World No. 24 in March 2019. Following the Australian Open, De Minaur suffered a groin injury, sidelining him for two months. At Wimbledon, De Minaur won his opening round before losing to Steve Johnson in the second round in five sets. De Minaur made his fourth ATP Final in Atlanta where he defeated Taylor Fritz to clinch the trophy. He did not face a single break point in the four matches he played during the tournament, winning 116 of 123 first serve points.

At the US Open, de Minaur defeated Kei Nishikori in third round, earning his first career win over a top 10-ranked opponent. He reached the fourth round for the first time in the event, however, lost to Grigor Dimitrov 7–5, 6–3, 6–4.

In September, de Minaur claimed his third ATP title beating Frenchman Adrian Mannarino in two sets in the final of the Zhuhai Championships. At the Swiss Indoors, De Minaur reached the final of an ATP 500 event for the second time in his career, losing to Roger Federer. As a result, de Minaur reached a then career-high ranking of World No. 18.

De Minaur qualified as the first seed into the 2019 Next Generation ATP Finals. He beat Alejandro Davidovich Fokina, Miomir Kecmanović, Casper Ruud in group stage. He then beat Frances Tiafoe in the semis, before losing to Italian wildcard Jannik Sinner.

=== 2020: US Open quarterfinal ===
De Minaur started new season by playing for Australia at the first edition of the ATP Cup. He won his first two matches beating Alexander Zverev of Germany and Denis Shapovalov of Canada. Facing Great Britain in the quarterfinals, he lost his singles match to Dan Evans. However, in doubles, he and Nick Kyrgios won a three-set thriller over Jamie Murray and Joe Salisbury to send Australia to the semifinals. However, in the semifinals, he was defeated by Rafael Nadal.

He withdrew from the first edition of the Adelaide International due to an abdominal strain. He also withdrew from the Australian Open due to the same injury. De Minaur returned from injury in February and played at the Mexican Open. He lost in the first round to Miomir Kecmanović. Due to the COVID-19 pandemic, many of the ATP tour tournaments were suspended.

At the Cincinnati Masters, his first tournament since February, he was eliminated in the first round by Jan-Lennard Struff. However, in doubles, De Minaur (partnered with Pablo Carreño Busta) won the 2020 Cincinnati Masters doubles title, defeating Jamie Murray and Neal Skupski in the final (6–2, 7–5).

At the US Open, he reached his first Grand Slam quarterfinal, where he was beaten by eventual champion Dominic Thiem.

In Rome, de Minaur was defeated in the first round by German qualifier Dominik Koepfer. At the French Open, he was beaten in the first round by qualifier and 2018 semi-finalist, Marco Cecchinato. At the European Open, de Minaur reached the final where he lost to Ugo Humbert. Following this, at the Paris Masters, he was knocked out in the third round by eventual champion, Daniil Medvedev.

He played his final tournament of the season at the Sofia Open, where he was defeated in the quarterfinals by the eventual champion Jannik Sinner. De Minaur ended the year ranked No. 23.

=== 2021: Fifth ATP title ===
De Minaur started his 2021 season at the Antalya Open. Seeded fourth, he won his fourth ATP singles title when his opponent, eighth seed Alexander Bublik, retired from the final due to a right ankle injury. Playing for Australia at the 2021 ATP Cup, he lost both of his matches to Roberto Bautista Agut and Stefanos Tsitsipas. Seeded 21st at the Australian Open, he reached the third round where he was defeated by 16th seed Fabio Fognini.

In March, de Minaur competed at the Rotterdam Open. Here, he was eliminated in the second round by Kei Nishikori. Seeded ninth at the Dubai Championships, he fell in the second round to Jérémy Chardy. Seeded 15th at the Miami Open, he suffered a second-round upset at the hands of Daniel Elahi Galán.

Moving on to the clay-court season, de Minaur played at the Monte-Carlo Masters. He was beaten in the first round by Alejandro Davidovich Fokina. Seeded 14th at the Barcelona Open, he made it to the third round where he lost to second seed and eventual finalist, Stefanos Tsitsipas. In Madrid, he was defeated in the third round by third seed and two-time finalist, Dominic Thiem. At the Italian Open, he was eliminated in the first round by Italian wildcard Gianluca Mager. Seeded 21st at the French Open, he was beaten in the second round by Marco Cecchinato.

In June, De Minaur had a short but successful grass season. Seeded fourth at the Stuttgart Open, he reached the quarterfinals where he lost to Jurij Rodionov. Seeded fourth at the Queen's Club, he made it to the semifinals where he fell to top seed Matteo Berrettini. In doubles, he and Cameron Norrie reached the semifinals where they lost to Reilly Opelka/John Peers. In the week before Wimbledon, he won his first title on grass and fifth in his career at the Eastbourne International defeating Lorenzo Sonego in the final. With this run, he reached a new career-high singles ranking No. 15. Seeded 15th at Wimbledon, he could not keep up his good form and lost in the first round to Sebastian Korda.

De Minaur pulled out of the Tokyo Olympics due to testing positive for COVID-19.

He returned to action in August at the Washington Open. Seeded third, he was defeated in the second round by Steve Johnson. Seeded 12th at the Canadian Open, he was eliminated in the second round by Nikoloz Basilashvili. Seeded 14th at the Western & Southern Open in Cincinnati, he fell in his second-round match to Gaël Monfils. Seeded 14th at the US Open, he lost in the first round to Taylor Fritz.

Seeded fourth at the Moselle Open, De Minaur's woes continued as he was defeated in the second round by Marcos Giron. Seeded third in Sofia, he again lost in the second round to Giron. Seeded 22nd at the Indian Wells Masters, he reached the fourth round where he faced second seed Stefanos Tsitsipas whom he pushed to three sets, but ended up losing the match. Seeded sixth and last year finalist at the European Open, he fell in the first round to American qualifier Brandon Nakashima. In Vienna, he was eliminated in his second-round match by second seed and eventual champion, Alexander Zverev. At the Paris Masters, he was beaten in the first round by lucky loser and compatriot, Alexei Popyrin.

De Minaur ended the year ranked No. 34.

=== 2022: Major fourth round, Atlanta title ===
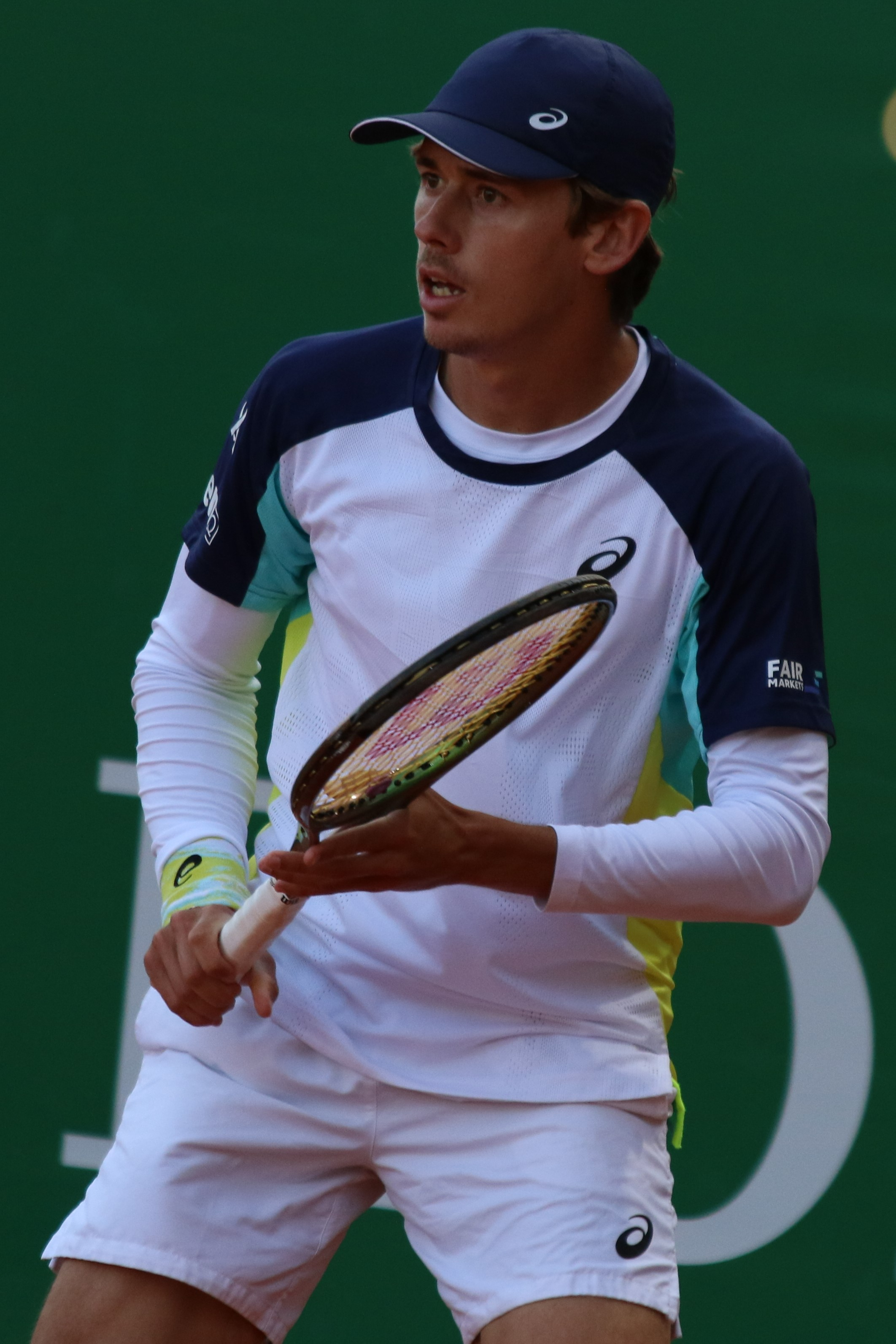
De Minaur at the 2022 Monte-Carlo Masters

De Minaur started his 2022 season by representing Australia at the ATP Cup. Australia was in Group B alongside Italy, Russia, and France. In his first match, he beat world No. 7, Matteo Berrettini, of Italy, for his first victory against a top 10 player since 2020. He then lost his second match to world No. 2, Daniil Medvedev of Russia, in straight sets. In his final tie, he defeated Ugo Humbert of France. In the end, Australia ended second in Group B. Seeded 32nd at the Australian Open, he reached the fourth round of a Grand Slam for the third time in his career and the first time at the Australian Open. He ended up losing to 11th seed and world No. 10, Jannik Sinner.

In February, de Minaur competed at the Rotterdam Open. He reached the quarterfinals where he lost to top seed, world No. 4, and eventual finalist, Stefanos Tsitsipas. In Dubai, he was defeated in the first round by Karen Khachanov. Playing for Australia in the Davis Cup tie against Hungary, de Minaur helped Australia win the tie 3–2 over Hungary by beating Zsombor Piros and Márton Fucsovics. Seeded 29th at Indian Wells, he made it to the fourth round where he was beaten by 20th seed and eventual champion, Taylor Fritz. Seeded 25th at the Miami Open, he lost in the third round to third seed and world No. 5, Stefanos Tsitsipas.

De Minaur started his clay-court season at the Monte-Carlo Masters. He lost in the second round to fifth seed, world No. 8, and last year finalist, Andrey Rublev, in three sets. Seeded 10th at the Barcelona Open, he upset fourth seed and world No. 10, Cam Norrie in the quarterfinals. He lost his semifinal match to fifth seed, world No. 11, and eventual champion, Carlos Alcaraz, in three sets, despite having two match points at 7–6, 6–5. In Madrid, he was defeated in the second round by tenth seed Jannik Sinner. At the Italian Open, he reached the third round where he was beaten by second seed, world No. 3, and 2017 champion, Alexander Zverev. Seeded fourth at the Lyon Open, he reached the semifinals where he fell to Alex Molčan. Seeded 19th at the French Open, he was knocked out in the first round by world No. 74 ranked Frenchman, Hugo Gaston, in a five set match which lasted almost four hours.

De Minaur started his grass-court season at the Libéma Open. Seeded fourth, he lost in the second round to 2019 champion Adrian Mannarino. At the Queen's Club Championships, he upset eighth seed and world No. 18, Reilly Opelka, in the first round. He was defeated in the second round by Alejandro Davidovich Fokina.

He won his sixth title at the 2022 Atlanta Open defeating James Duckworth, Adrian Mannarino, Ilya Ivashka and Jenson Brooksby in the final.

He won his 150th match at the 2022 Stockholm Open defeating Benjamin Bonzi. Next he defeated JJ Wolf and fourth seed Denis Shapovalov to reach the semifinals where he lost to Holger Rune. The following week at the next tournament in Basel he lost again to Holger Rune in the first round. At the 2022 Rolex Paris Masters he won in the first round against Sebastian Korda. He reached the third round for the third time at this tournament defeating world No. 3 Daniil Medvedev for his biggest and first top-5 win in 19 attempts.

De Minaur ended the year with a singles rank of No. 24.

=== 2023: ATP 500 title, top 20 ===
Alex de Minaur began his 2023 season by competing for Australia in the Inaugural United Cup. He lost to Cameron Norrie of Great Britain in straight sets, before claiming the biggest win of his career against then-world No. 2, Rafael Nadal of Spain. De Minaur lost in the fourth round of the Australian Open to eventual champion Novak Djokovic, in straight sets winning only five games.

At the Rotterdam Open, De Minaur recorded his third top-5 win, defeating Andrey Rublev in his opening match. He made it to the quarterfinals before losing to Grigor Dimitrov, after having match points.

In March, De Minaur won his seventh overall and first ATP 500 title at the Mexican Open, defeating Tommy Paul. As a result, he returned to the top 20 in the rankings on 6 March 2023.

Following this run, at the 2023 BNP Paribas Open he lost in the second round in less than an hour and a half to Marton Fucsovics having received a bye in the first round. At the 2023 Miami Open he also lost in the second round to Quentin Halys in a three hours and 20 minutes match with three tiebreaks.

On grass, De Minaur reached a final at the Queen's Club Championships, losing to world No. 2 Carlos Alcaraz. He lost at Wimbledon in the second round to the unseeded Matteo Berrettini.

At the 2023 Los Cabos Open, he made it to the final, where he lost to top seed Stefanos Tsitsipas. At the Canadian Open, he reached his first Masters 1000 final, beating back-to-back top ten players, Taylor Fritz and Daniil Medvedev, seeded eighth and second, respectively – having previously never made it past the round of 16 at a Masters tournament. De Minaur lost in the final to Jannik Sinner in straight sets. De Minaur's successful Canadian Open campaign was followed by a fourth round appearance at the US Open, where he was defeated by third seed Daniil Medvedev. Afterwards, De Minaur participated in the China Open, where he defeated Andy Murray in three sets after saving 3 match points in a lengthy 3-hour match, however, lost again to Medvedev in the following round. Consequently, he rose to a career-high singles ranking of world No. 11.

During the indoor hardcourt swing, De Minaur defeated Andy Murray again at the Paris Masters in three sets in his first round, after saving a match point, becoming the first person to beat Andy Murray in their first 6 attempts and the first person to beat Andy Murray on clay, grass and indoor and outdoor hard court. In his next match, he defeated Dušan Lajović in 3 sets for his 200th career win. De Minaur received a walkover from Jannik Sinner in the round of 16, sending him into his second Masters 1000 quarterfinal of his career (both appearances came this year). He lost in 3 sets to Andrey Rublev.

=== 2024: Win over No. 1, Major quarterfinals, top 10 & ATP Finals debuts ===
De Minaur started his year at the 2024 United Cup, where he lost to world No. 18, Cameron Norrie of Great Britain. He won against world No. 10, Taylor Fritz, in his first match of the year, to help Team Australia advance to the quarterfinals of the round-robin tournament, after they edged out the US and Great Britain in game-winning percentage. In the quarterfinals, he upset Novak Djokovic 6–4, 6–4 on Australia's way to a 3–0 victory, his first win over a world No. 1, and handed Djokovic his first loss in Australia since Hyeon Chung beat him at the 2018 Australian Open. In the semifinals, he came from a set down to notch his third consecutive top-10 victory of the tournament, after beating world No. 7 Alexander Zverev. However, Australia failed to progress to the finals, following a 1–2 defeat to eventual champions Germany. As a result, he became the first Australian man to enter the world's top 10 since Lleyton Hewitt in 2006, and held the position for two weeks till 29 January 2024, marking the end of the 2024 Australian Open, where he reached the fourth round.

In February, De Minaur competed at the Rotterdam Open, where he was seeded fifth. He reached the final after upsetting second seed and world No. 5, Andrey Rublev in the quarterfinals and then defeating Grigor Dimitrov in the semifinals. In the finals, he lost to Jannik Sinner in straight sets, and thus, rose to a new career-high ranking of world No. 9.

At the Mexican Open, De Minaur defended his Acapulco title, defeating Stefanos Tsitsipas in the quarterfinals for the first time and defeating Casper Ruud in the final in straight sets. By doing this, de Minaur became the first player to defend a title in Acapulco since David Ferrer in 2012. At his following two tournaments, Indian Wells and Miami, he reached the fourth round, before losing to Alexander Zverev and Fábián Marozsán, respectively.

De Minaur began his clay season in Monte-Carlo where he defeated Stan Wawrinka, Tallon Griekspoor and Alexei Popyrin to reach his first Masters quarterfinal on clay. He lost to Novak Djokovic in straight sets. After receiving a bye, he then defeated Rafael Nadal at Barcelona, before losing to Arthur Fils in the third round. In Madrid, he again faced Nadal, but lost to him in straight sets. He fared better in Rome where he reached the fourth round, before losing to Stefanos Tsitsipas.

At the French Open, De Minaur was seeded 11th. He beat Alex Michelsen and Jaume Munar to make his best result at the tournament and reach the third round. There, he beat Jan-Lennard Struff in four sets to go a round further. In the fourth round, de Minaur beat Daniil Medvedev in four sets to become the first Australian man to reach the quarterfinals of the French Open since Lleyton Hewitt in 2004. He lost to Alexander Zverev in the quarterfinals. This run also resulted in his return to the top 10.

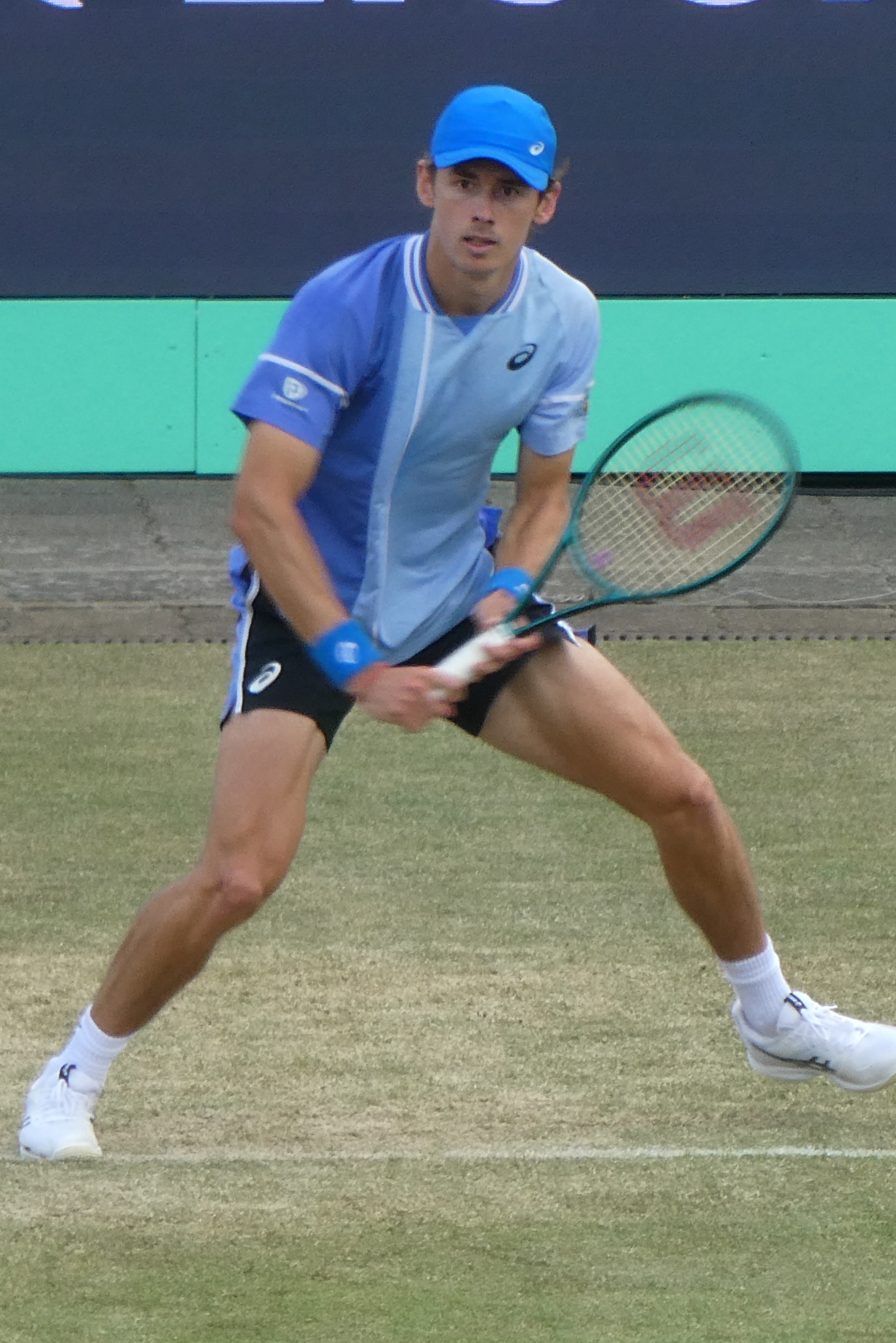
De Minaur at the 2024 Rosmalen Open

At the Rosmalen Open, De Minaur won his ninth ATP Tour singles title against Sebastian Korda in straight sets to start off the grass court season, becoming the first Australian to win the championship match since 2001. On the way to the title, he did not lose a set and also reached a career high of world No. 7 in the rankings on 17 June 2024.

At Wimbledon, De Minaur made his first Wimbledon quarterfinals beating James Duckworth, Jaume Munar, Lucas Pouille (via walkover) and Arthur Fils. By getting to the fourth round, De Minaur became the first Australian in 19 years to reach four consecutive major fourth rounds, but withdrew before the quarterfinals due to a hip injury. Despite that he reached a new career-high ranking of world No. 6 on 15 July 2024.

At the US Open, he reached a third consecutive Grand Slam quarterfinal for the season without facing a seeded opponent, with wins over Marcos Giron, qualifier Otto Virtanen, Dan Evans and Jordan Thompson before losing in straight sets to seed 25 Jack Draper.

De Minaur made his ATP Finals debut in Turin, becoming the first Australian man to do so in singles since Lleyton Hewitt in 2004.

=== 2025: Australian Open quarterfinal, Third ATP 500 title ===
De Minaur started his 2025 season representing Australia at the United Cup, defeating Tomás Martín Etcheverry of Argentina and Billy Harris of Great Britain. Despite this, Australia failed to progress out of the group stage. De Minaur continued his good performance at the 2025 Australian Open, where he was seeded 8th, reaching the quarterfinals for the first time. He was then defeated by top seed and eventual champion Jannik Sinner in straight sets. De Minaur then made it to his first ATP 500 final of the year at the Rotterdam Open, though lost to Carlos Alcaraz in 3 sets.

At Wimbledon, De Minaur reached the round of 16, after defeating Roberto Carballés, qualifier Arthur Cazaux, and another qualifier August Holmgren. He then lost his round-4 battle with Novak Djokovic in four sets.

Following Wimbledon, De Minaur reached the final of his second ATP 500 tournament for 2025 after defeating lucky loser Corentin Moutet at the Washington Open. He then won his tenth overall and third ATP 500 title after defeating Alejandro Davidovich Fokina in a third-set tiebreak. As a result, he returned to the top 10 in the rankings.

=== 2026: Out of top 10 ===
De Minaur at the 2026 Cincinnati Open

De Minaur started his season at the 2026 United Cup, representing Australia, where he beat Jakub Menšík of Czechia but lost to Casper Ruud of Norway. Nonetheless, he helped Australia progress to the quarterfinal, where they lost to Poland 1-2 despite de Minaur's victory over Hubert Hurkacz. He then participated at the 2026 Australian Open where reached his second successive quarterfinal before losing to eventual champion Carlos Alcaraz.

At the French Open he lost in the third round to Jakub Menšík. At Wimbledon, he lost in the fourth round to Flavio Cobolli. At the US Open, he lost in the second round to Botic van de Zandschulp.

== Playing style ==
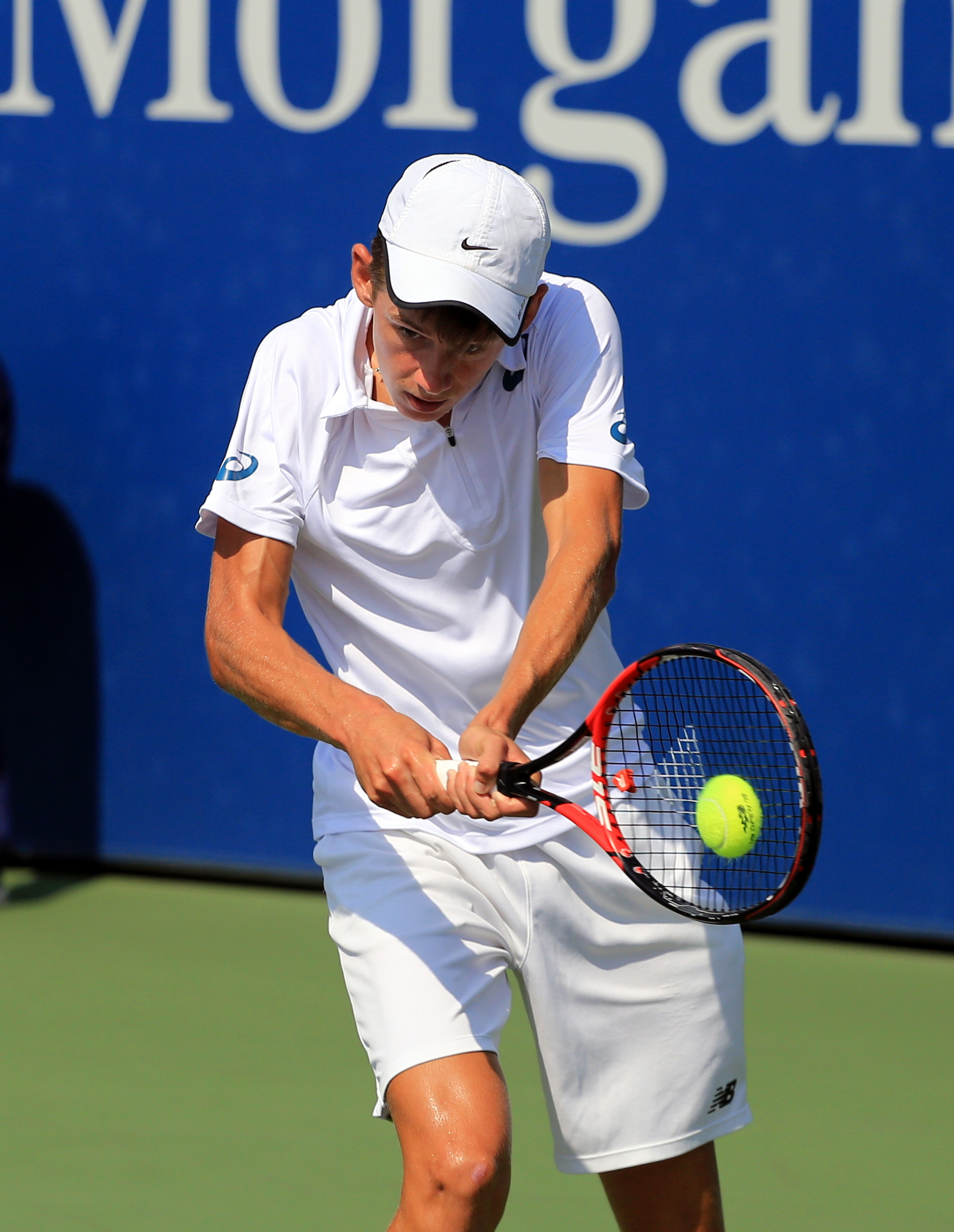
De Minaur competing in the Boys' Singles at the 2015 US Open

De Minaur is famous for his speed and agility on court, which have earned him the jocular title "Speed Demon" on the tour. He is famous for using a novelty jumbo tennis racquet from a shop display.

De Minaur is known for his speed and defensive style of play. He has been described as one of the quickest players on the ATP Tour; opponents such as Vasek Pospisil and Dominic Thiem have highlighted his court coverage, speed, and movement accuracy. De Minaur has said his movement improved through technical work from a young age and by adapting to his physical attributes, while his coach Adolfo Gutierrez stated that he had “always” been very fast despite having flat feet early on.

His baseline game suits that of a counterpuncher, often retrieving balls and slowly constructing points. However, he is also known to inject sudden pace into rallies to surprise opponents, and often opts for a one-two combination on his serve, using the serve and a powerful groundstroke to end points quickly. His forehand is significantly better than his backhand on the offensive, and he often uses it to construct points or hit winners when attacking.

De Minaur's serve is considered his main weakness in his game, with both his first and second serve being considerably weaker than his counterparts in terms of power and a relatively high double fault count, in which it's considered the main attacking point for opponents. His volleys were initially a weakness too, but have improved, moving towards a more transitional offensive game.

Critics point out that despite his defensive capabilities, de Minaur does not possess any real weapons to use against top opponents. Some have argued his defensive game is unsustainable physically in the long-term and is not sufficient to challenge better players, as he tends to play himself out of aggressive positions.

== National representation ==
=== ATP Cup ===
De Minaur made his ATP Cup debut for Australia in January 2020. He scored a victory against then world No.7 Alexander Zverev; which helped Australia claim a 3–0 victory over Germany and qualify for the quarterfinals. Despite losing his singles match against Dan Evans for Great Britain, he teamed up with Nick Kyrgios for the doubles, where they won in three sets and advanced to the semifinals. Team Australia then lost 3–0 to Spain in the semifinals.

De Minaur returned for the 2021 edition but was ultimately knocked out in the group stage following a 3–0 loss to Spain and a loss in his singles match against Stefanos Tsitsipas.

For the final edition of the tournament, de Minaur defeated world No. 7 Matteo Berrettini in straight sets to help Australia beat Italy 2–1. Going against defending champions, Russia, the Australians lost 3–0, including a straight sets loss against Daniil Medvedev. De Minaur then beat Ugo Humbert for a 2–1 win against France, though the team did not make it to the knockout stage.

=== Davis Cup ===
In early February 2018, De Minaur made his Davis Cup debut for Australia at 18 years of age, against then world No.5 Alexander Zverev from Germany in the opening rubber. He fell just short of a spectacular upset, losing in a fifth-set tiebreaker after at one point leading 3–0, (40–Ad.) in the decider.

=== Olympics ===
De Minaur was selected to represent Australia at the 2020 Tokyo Olympics (held in July 2021), but was forced to withdraw after testing positive for COVID-19.

=== United Cup ===
De Minaur made his United Cup debut for Australia in December 2022. He scored a victory against the world No. 2 Rafael Nadal, his biggest career win thus far. It was his eighth top-10 career win and only his second in the top-5. Despite this win Australia did not advance out of the group into the knockout stage. In 2024, de Minaur and team Australia were much more successful, advancing to the semifinals, helped by de Minaur winning against 3 top 10 players, including world No. 1 Novak Djokovic.

== Personal life ==
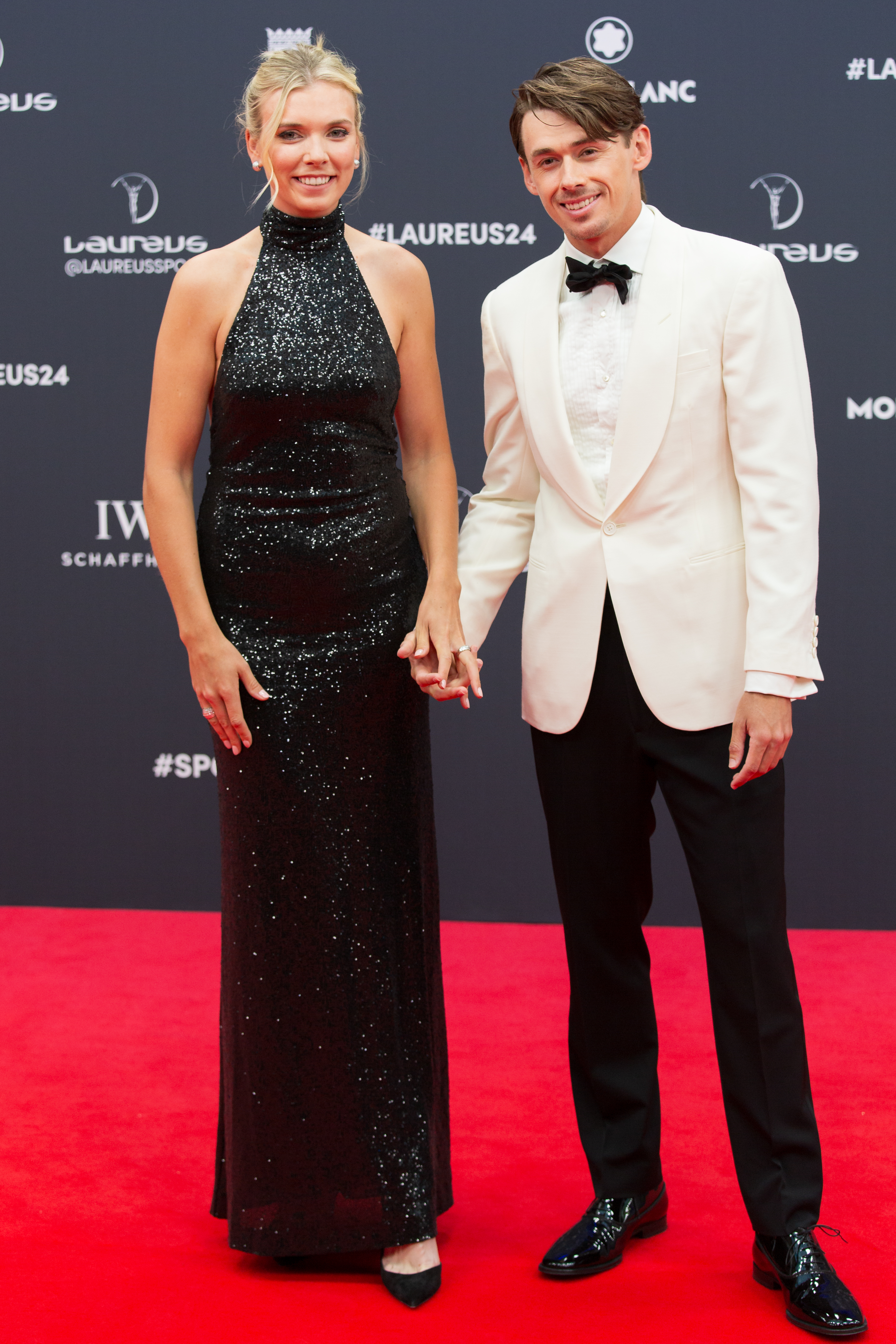
de Minaur with Katie Boulter in 2024.

Since March 2020, de Minaur has been in a relationship with the British tennis player Katie Boulter. The couple announced their engagement on 23 December 2024. The couple married on 12 July 2026.

De Minaur can reportedly speak three languages: English, Spanish, and French. He is a fan of Real Madrid in the Spanish La Liga, and supports the New South Wales state rugby league team, donning their sky blue jersey during a 2018 press conference, and adopting the "Blue Wall" motto used by its fans and supporters.

== Career statistics ==
=== Grand Slam performance timelines ===
Key
W	F	SF	QF	#R	RR	Q#	DNQ	A	NH

(W) winner; (F) finalist; (SF) semifinalist; (QF) quarterfinalist; (#R) rounds 4, 3, 2, 1; (RR) round-robin stage; (Q#) qualification round; (DNQ) did not qualify; (A) absent; (NH) not held; (SR) strike rate (events won / competed); (W–L) win–loss record.
To avoid confusion and double counting, these charts are updated at the conclusion of a tournament or when the player's participation has ended.

Current through the 2026 US Open.

Tournament	2016	2017	2018	2019	2020	2021	2022	2023	2024	2025	2026	SR	W–L	Win %
Australian Open	Q1	2R	1R	3R	A	3R	4R	4R	4R	QF	QF	0 / 9	22–9	71%
French Open	A	1R	1R	2R	1R	2R	1R	2R	QF	2R	3R (Note: De Minaur received a walkover in the second round, which does not count as a win.)	0 / 10	9–10	47%
Wimbledon	A	Q2	3R	2R	NH	1R	4R	2R	QF (Note: De Minaur received a walkover in the third round, which does not count as a win; he later withdrew in the quarterfinals, which does not count as a loss.)	4R	4R	0 / 8	16–7	70%
US Open	A	1R	3R	4R	QF	1R	3R	4R	QF	QF	2R	0 / 10	23–10	70%
Win–loss	0–0	1–3	4–4	7–4	4–2	3–4	8–4	8–4	14–3	12–4	9–4	0 / 37	70–36	66%

=== ATP 1000 tournament finals ===
==== Singles: 1 (runner-up) ====
Result	Year	Tournament	Surface	Opponent	Score
Loss	2023	Canadian Open	Hard	(Italy) Jannik Sinner	4–6, 1–6

==== Doubles: 1 (title) ====
Result	Year	Tournament	Surface	Partner	Opponents	Score
Win	2020	Cincinnati Open	Hard	(Spain) Pablo Carreño Busta	(United Kingdom) Jamie Murray (United Kingdom) Neal Skupski	6–2, 7–5

== Notes ==
Awards
Preceded by (Canada) Denis Shapovalov (Star of Tomorrow)	ATP Newcomer of the Year; 2018	Succeeded by (Italy) Jannik Sinner
